= Japanese the Manga Way =

Educational book by Wayne P. Lammers

Japanese the Manga Way cover.

Japanese the Manga Way: An Illustrated Guide to Grammar & Structure (with the alternative Japanese title of マンガで学ぶ日本語文法, Manga de Manabu Nihongo Bunpō) is an educational book by Wayne P. Lammers published by Stone Bridge Press designed to teach Japanese through the use of manga. The use of a pop-culture teaching aid in the form of manga represents a growing trend of Japanese-as-a-second-language students learning for fun, instead of for business reasons.

Its origins began with the canceled journal Mangajin, where Lammers worked as a checker for Vaughan P. Simmons's Mangajin drafts. Following the end of the Mangajin publications, deals with manga publishers had been negotiated, and Lammers had obtained the rights to use the translation notes, comic panels found in Mangajin for the new book. The new book also inherited the four-line translation format from Mangajin.

== Manga used ==
- OL Shinkaron
- Okusama Shinkaron
- Zesetsu Gendai Yōgo Binran
- Bar Lemon Heart
- Kachō Shima Kōsaku
- Buchō Shima Kōsaku
- Kaji Ryūsake no Gi
- Obatarian
- Bonobono
- Ojama Shimasu
- Ishii Hisaichi Senshū
- What's Michael?
- Dai-Tokyo Binbo Seikatsu Manual
- Nat-chan wa ne!?
- Ai ga Hoshii
- Kaishain no Melody
- Shoot!
- Natsuko no Sake
- Natsu no Kura
- Take'emon-ke no Hitobito
- Sr. Garcia
- Don't Cry, Tanaka-kun
- Ashita mo genki!
- Maboroshi no Futsū Shōjo
- Furiten-kun
- Kariage-kun
- Crayon Shin-chan

== See also ==
- Japanese in Mangaland
- Mangajin
