= Mangajin =

Monthly English-language magazine (1988–1997)

- First printed issue of Mangajin
- Categories: Manga, Japanese culture, language learning
- Publisher: Mangajin, Inc.
- Founded: 1988
- Final issue: December 1997
- Company: Mangajin, Inc.
- Language: English
- Website: mangajin.com (archived)

Mangajin was a monthly English-language magazine for students of Japanese language and culture by Mangajin, Inc. It was distinct from many other magazines of its type in that it unabashedly embraced Japanese popular culture, as a learning tool and a route towards rapid acclimation into Japanese society. Each issue featured selections from various popular manga translated into English with detailed cultural and linguistic commentary.

It was a unique language learning tool in that the manga that it excerpted showed the use of the language in various types of informal conversations. It would feature a few pages of manga with explanations of the grammar used and when that grammar/vocabulary combination might be appropriate. By contrast, most Japanese language textbooks for early students focus on formal versions of the language appropriate for business discussions.

The magazine ceased publication in December 1997 (issue 70) due to financial hardship. The name is a combination of the Japanese words for "comic" (漫画, manga) and "person" (人, jin).

== History ==
Mangajin began shaping in 1988, when businessman and translator Vaughan P. Simmons began making prototypes of a magazine that could combine Japanese popular culture, entertainment, and language learning into one. Simmons worked with clients from American and European companies and saw how successful they could be with the Japanese and learned the culture, which boosted up the motivation for Mangajin. When developing the concept, manga became an ideal solution with the medium being so large and attracting some of the best artists and writers. Manga also gives a big perspective on real Japanese society and how the language is spoken. Simmons started creating a "four-line-format" which shows the actual text as found in a Japanese manga, a romanization for pronunciation, a literal translation showing the structure of the expression, and an idiomatic English equivalent.

Beginning with issue #49, the magazines include companion audio tapes for the corresponding issues until the end of the print edition at issue #70. Each tape contains audio reenactments of all of the Japanese manga material in that issue. Side A contains the stories acted by native Japanese-speaking voice actors. Side B contains stories read without pause, first in Japanese, then in English. For some of the longer/wordier issues, part of the line-by-line recording from Side A runs over onto Side B.

North American versions were distributed by Weatherhill, Inc. Following the end of print magazine publication, Wasabi Brothers Trading Company and Rolomail Trading became publishers for Mangajin materials. Following the purchases of Weatherhill, Inc. by Shambhala Publications, Mangajin materials were published by Shambhala Publications.

Japanese versions were distributed by Sekai Shuppan, inc.

== Features ==
=== Manga series (bilingual English-Japanese) ===
Title	Author	Issues
Assari-kun	Sou Nishimura	1
Hotel	Shōtarō Ishinomori	1, 2, 30, 31
Don't cry, Tanaka-kun! (泣くな！ 田中くん)	Hiroshi Tanaka	1, 2, 6, 8, 10, 11, 12, 13, 14, 17, 19, 22, 23, 24, 25, 27, 28, 29, 34, 42, 46, 51
Theater Appare	Yoshiie Goda	1, 3
What's Michael?	Makoto Kobayashi	1, 2, 3, 5, 8, 9, 11, 13, 14, 17, 20, 24, 33, 40, 45, 57, 68
Jimi-Hen	Nakazaki Tatsuya	2, 3
Dai-Tōkyō Binbō Seikatsu Manual (ビンボー生活マニュアル)	Tsukasa Maekawa	3, 4, 5, 6, 8, 10, 11, 12 (Note: The first story to feature the definitive "four‑line format", which was gradually extended to the entire lineup over the next few releases.), 14, 15, 16, 19, 22, 26, 27, 34, 35, 42, 44, 51, 65
Pocket Story	Masayuki Mori	3, 4, 6, 10, 12, 15, 42, 58
OL Shinkaron	Akizuki Risu	4, 5, 10, 11, 15, 23, 26, 27, 29, 31, 33, 34, 36, 37, 38, 40, 41, 42, 43, 47, 54, 56
Obatarian	Hotta Katsuhiko	4, 5, 7, 10, 11, 14, 15, 18, 19, 20, 23, 25, 26, 27, 30, 35, 38, 39, 40, 50, 51, 54, 59
Toppu wa Ore da!!	Torii Kazuyoshi	4
Gokigen Ne, Dadi	Aoki Kimuko	5
Haguregumo	George Akiyama	5
Galaxy Express 999	Matsumoto Reiji	6, 7, 8, 9, 10
Urusei Yatsura	Takahashi Rumiko	7, 8, 9
San-pun-kan no Dekigoto	Tanioka Yasuji	9
O-jama Shimasu (オジャマします)	Imazeki Shin	10, 11, 13, 16, 18, 19, 21, 34, 37
Sarari-kun (サラリくん)	Nishimura So	10, 11, 20, 21, 22, 24, 30
Ningen Kosaten (釣りバカ日誌)	Yajima Massao, Hirokane Kenshi	11, 12, 20, 21, 47, 48, 49
The Silent Service	Kawaguchi Kaiji	13
Chijou Saikyou no Jinrui	Tanioka Yasuji	13
Konnichi-wa Kuriko-san (くろこさん、こんにちは)	Terashima Reiko	13, 15, 17, 21, 25, 31, 50
Korobokkuru-kun	Kazuichi Hanawa	13
Beranmei Tochan (べらんめい父ちゃん)	Tachibanaya Kikutaro	14, 15, 19, 20, 21, 22, 26, 28, 37, 39, 43
Sarariman Senka (サラリーマン専科)	Sadao Shoji	14, 16, 18, 46, 58, 65
Tsurumoku Bachelors' Dormitory	Kubonouchi Eisaku	14, 15
Bonobono	Igarashi Mikio	16
Oishinbo	Kariya Tetsu, Hanasaki Akira	16, 17, 18
Phoenix	Tezuka Osamu	17, 18, 19
Eigyo Tenteko Nisshi (営業てんてこ日誌)	Gyu & Kondo	18, 19
Yuyake no Uta (夕焼けの詩)	Saigan Ryohei	21, 38, 39, 66, 67
After Zero (アフター0)	Okazaki Jiro	22, 30, 31, 32, 41, 42, 43, 61, 62, 63
Furiten-kun	Gyu & Kondo	22, 24, 26, 28, 35, 36, 37, 38, 40, 52, 64
Tsuri-Baka Nisshi (釣りバカ日誌)	Yamasaki & Kitami	22, 23
Crayon Shin-chan	Yoshito Usui	23, 24, 36, 41, 43, 45, 52, 58, 68
Sanshiro no Koi (三四郎の恋)	Maekawa Tsukasa	23, 29
Midori-san (みどりさん)	Akizuki Risu	24, 31
O-Daiji ni (おだいじに)	Kourita Christophe	24
Bar Lemon Hart (Bar レモンハート)	Furuya Mitsutoshi	25
Manga Business Manners (マンガビジネスマナー)	Degushi & Minagawa	26, 27
Yawara!	Urasawa Naoki	26, 27
Katsushika Q (葛飾Q)	Tomisawa Chinatsu	28, 31, 50
Kachō Kōsaku Shima	Hirokane Kenshi	28, 29
Garcia-kun (ガルシアくん)	Takeuchi Akira	29, 30, 40, 44, 53, 60
Selected Works of Ishii Hisaichi (いしいひさいち選集)	Ishii Hisaichi	30, 31, 33, 38, 39, 44, 58, 59, 63, 64
A Visual Glossary of Modern Terms (図説現代用語便覧)	Deluxe Company	32, 33, 34, 36, 41, 42, 51, 57, 58
Dr. Slump	Toriyama Akira	32, 33
Take'emon-ke no Hitobito (タケエモン家のひとびと)	Sato Take'emon	33, 36, 40, 51, 58
The Laughing Salesman	Fujiko Fujio A	33, 34, 36, 37
Naniwa Kin'yūdō	Aoki Yuji	34, 35, 36, 37, 38, 39, 40
Arerugen	Nakasa Yoshiro	35
Ol Reiko-san (OL れい子さん)	Yamada Sanpei	36, 37, 46
Maboroshi no Futsu Shojo	Uchida Shungiku	38
Okusama wa Interior Designer	Akizuki Risu	38, 65
Shoot!	Oshima Tsukasa	39
Hyaku Monogotari	Sugiura Hinako	40
Fancy Dance	Okano Reiko	41
Kachō-san Shigoto Desu Yo	Matsuura Seiji	42, 44
Imadoki no Kodomo (いまどきのこども)	Kubō Kiriko	42, 64, 70
Torishimariyaku Hira Namijirō	Nitta Tatsuo	43, 44, 45, 46
Cooking Papa	Ueyama Tochi	44
Nippon Cha-Cha-Cha	Yamazaki Kosuke	45, 54, 56
Living Game	Hoshisato Mochiru	46, 48
Kono Hito ni Kakero	Shu Ryoka, Yumeno Kazuko	47, 48, 49, 50, 51, 52, 53, 54, 55
Run! Run! Alcindo!	Ohira Kazuo	48
Reggie	Guy Jeans, Minoru Hiramatsu	49, 50, 51, 52
Ai ga Hoshii	Nonaka Nobara	49, 57
Selections by Deluxe Company	Deluxe Company	50
Otoko wa Tsurai Yo	Yamada Yoji	52, 53, 54
The Rakuten Family	Nitta Tomoko	52
Sore demo Megezu	Kawabata Issei	53
Kasai no Hito	Mohri Jinpachi, Uoto Osamu	53, 54, 55
Akogare Depa-Gyaru	Onuma Kaoru	54
Sekkachi-kun	Tanaka Sho	55
Kochikame	Osamu Akimoto	55, 56
Ponpoko Kachō	Hashimoto Iwao	55, 63
Boku-chin Yutosei	Kitami Jiro	55
Aji Ichi Monme	Abe Zenta, Kurata Yoshimi	56, 57
Ajimantei	Ono Shinjiro	56
Hyaku-nen Senryu	Goda Yoshiie	57, 60, 63, 67
Kekkon Shiyō Yo	Hoshisato Michiru	58, 59
Gal Gag World	Sato Ryosaku	58
Kaji Ryusuke no Gi	Hirokane Kenshi	59, 60, 51
Hana no Kararicho	Sonoyama Shunji	60
Kariage-kun	Ueda Masashi	60
Sawayaka Sanda	Tanba Tesshin	61
Sekai 4-Koma-ka Keikaku	Hatakeyama Konzern	61
Yunbo-kun	Saibara Rieko	61
Mammoth-like Ojosama	Okada Garu	61, 64
Kachō Baka Ichidai	Nonaka Eiji	62, 64, 69
Our Tono-sama	Meguro Yasushi	62
App-Install	Jonburi	62
Minori Densetsu	Oze Akira	62, 63, 64
Yarikuri Company	Hashimoto Iwao	62, 63
Happy Day	Matsuura Seiji	63
Honto ka na	George Gladir, Oyama Tetsuya	64, 66
Fuji Santaro	Sanpei Satō	65, 66
Bow	Terry Yamamoto	65
Non-Career Woman	Ishii Hisaichi	66, 70
Ninja Bugei-cho	Ishii Hisaichi	67
Ai no Wakakusayama Monogatari	Terashima Reiko	67
Kaiketsu!! Todo Kachō	Kadohashi Yasuto	67, 68, 69
C-Class Salaryman Course	Yamashina Keisuke	68
Honebuto-san	Fujisubo Miki	68, 70
Mix Connection (みっくす・こねくしょん)	Yoshito Usui	69
Kochira Shakai-bu	Otani Akihiro, Oshima Yasuichi	69, 70
Seishun Nigiri Punch	Hanakuma Yusaku	70

=== American comics (bilingual English-Japanese) ===
Title	Author	Issues
The Far Side	Gary Larson	12, 13, 14, 15, 16, 26, 28, 29, 30, 31, 32, 33, 34, 35, 36, 37, 38, 39, 40, 41, 42
Calvin and Hobbes	Bill Watterson	17, 18, 19, 20, 21, 22, 23, 24, 25, 26, 27, 28, 29, 30, 31, 32, 33, 34, 35, 36, 37, 38, 39, 40, 41, 42, 43, 44, 45, 46, 47, 48, 49, 50, 51, 52, 53, 54, 55, 56, 57, 58, 59
Shoe	Jeff MacNelly	43, 44, 45, 46
Garfield	Jim Davis	47, 48, 49, 50, 51, 52, 53, 54, 55, 57, 58, 59, 61, 62, 63, 64, 65, 66, 67, 68, 69, 70
Dilbert	Scott Adams	60, 61, 62, 63, 64, 65, 66, 67, 68, 69, 70

== Publications ==
=== Mangajin magazines ===
- Mangajin's Basic Japanese Through Comics: A compilation the Basic Japanese section from issues 1-24 of Mangajin in lesson format. Each lesson spans 6 pages and features explanations and illustrations.

- Weatherhill version: ISBN 083480452-2/ISBN 978-083480452-4

- Mangajin's Basic Japanese Through Comics (Part 2): Same as the previous release, but different lessons from issues 25-48 of Mangajin.

- Weatherhill version: ISBN 083480453-0/ISBN 978-083480453-1

- Mangajin CD-ROM: Contains selected manga from the first 10 issues of Mangajin magazine, with trademark translations, language and cultural notes, and digitalized native Japanese voice recording. Tony Gonzalez was the author of the CD-ROM.
- Mangajin's Japanese Grammar Through Comics

- Weatherhill version: ISBN 0-9634335-5-5/ISBN 978-0-9634335-5-8

=== Other Mangajin, Inc. books ===
- Bringing Home the Sushi: An Inside Look at Japanese Business through Japanese Comics: A collection of business manga, in English, with introductory essays by Japan specialists

- Weatherhill version: ISBN 0-9634335-2-0

- The Essence of Modern Haiku: 300 haiku poems by Seishi Yamaguchi: An English translation of Seishi Yamaguchi's haiku collection.

- Weatherhill version: ISBN 0-9634335-3-9/ISBN 978-0-9634335-3-4 (paperback), ISBN 0-9634335-0-4/ISBN 978-0-9634335-0-3 (hardcover)

- Senryū: Haiku Reflections of the Times: A compilation of 100 senryu that have appeared over an eight year period in Japan's most popular newspaper, the Yomiuri.
- Unlocking the Japanese Business Mind: An in-depth analysis of the complex cultural dynamics Japanese and Americans must confront when they come together to do business.

- DIANE Publishing Company version: ISBN 075675074-1/ISBN 978-075675074-9
- Weatherhill version: ISBN 093012410-3/ISBN 978-093012410-6

=== Rolomail Trading Company Products ===
- Joyo Kanji Wall Chart Set: Contains 3 wall charts with the entire 1,945 General Use Chinese Characters.
- The Kanji Way to Japanese Language Power

- 2nd edition: ISBN 09625489-0-1/ISBN 978-09625489-0-1

- A Guide to Remembering Japanese Characters: Includes etymology of 1,945 General Use Chinese Characters.

- 2nd edition: ISBN 080482038-4/ISBN 978-080482038-7

- Salaryman Kintaro: The Complete Series: Contains all 10 Volumes of the series.

=== Sekai Shuppan, inc. products ===
- Master English the Mangajin Way/ 漫画人英語上達革命 マンガで英語をものにするトレーニング・ブック: Includes print and cassette tape editions.

=== Stone Bridge Press products ===
- Japanese the Manga Way: An Illustrated Guide to Grammar and Structure: Includes translated comic book panels from the Mangajin magazines.

- Stone Bridge Press version: ISBN 1-880656-90-6/ISBN 978-1-880656-90-7

== See also ==
- List of manga magazines published outside of Japan
