= Kunio Okawara =

Japanese mechanical designer (born 1947)

- 大河原 邦男(おおかはら くにお)
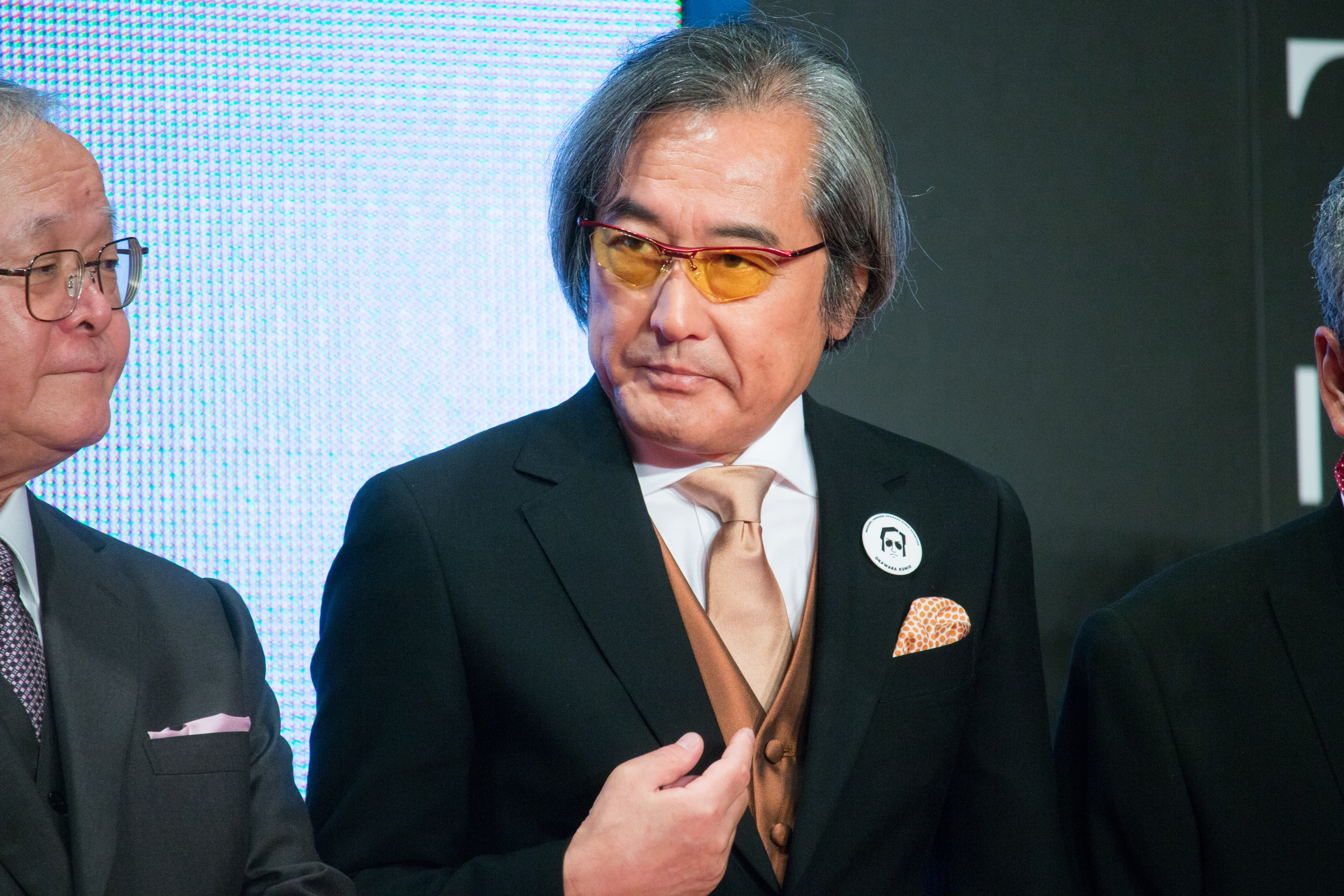
- Born: December 26, 1947 (age 78)
- Occupations: mechanical designer; mostly for anime
- Years active: 1972–present
- Employers: Tatsunoko Production (1972-1975); Design Office Mechaman (1976-1978); Freelance (1978-present)

Kunio Okawara (大河原 邦男, Ōkawara Kunio; born December 26, 1947) is a mecha designer in the Japanese anime industry. He was born and currently lives in Inagi, Tokyo, where he works out of a studio in his home.

He was one of the pioneering mecha designers in Japan and established the profession of 'mecha design' in the anime industry.

His representative works include Gundam series from the Real Robot shows, the Brave series from the Super Robot shows and Time Bokan series from the comedy anime.

In 2011, he received the Distinguished Service Award of the Japan Media Arts Festival for his achievements over the years.

== Style ==
When designing a mecha, Okawara considers the process of deformation and even the process of manufacturing it in reality, and imagines something that can be immediately generated into a CAD blueprint. Ordinary designers draw a number of pictures, but he often makes models in wood or metalwork, as he thinks it is quicker to show the real thing.

The origin of this is that when he entered the industry in the 1970s and 1980s, robot anime was at its peak and many of the sponsors of anime programmes in Japan were toy companies. At the time, he was the only one who could talk about 'transforming' and 'combining', so when he made presentations using three-dimensional objects, the sponsors were very receptive, and his ideas were usually accepted immediately.

He also started producing 3DCG using a computer when a games company asked him to do some design work.

His style ranges from Real Robots in serious anime to humorous mecha designs in comedy anime. He says that what he enjoys working on is the Time Bokan series, because there's no critical feedback, only reactions that everyone enjoys watching it.

== Biography ==
Okawara entered Tokyo Zokei University as a first-year student. Although he majored in graphic design, the department was very popular at the time due to Tadanori Yokoo's heyday, so he transferred to textile design in his second year, where there were few competitors. Following graduation, Okawara worked for Onward Kashiyama, the largest textile and apparel company, where he designed mass-produced ready-made suits. He then moved to Kimuratan in search of a more rewarding career and worked on the children's brand 'Otogi no Kuni', but left the company when he was transferred to the sales department due to business downsizing.

In April 1972, Okawara joined Tatsunoko Production after seeing the job section in the newspaper. He had no interest in manga or anime, but applied for a job anyway as he was due to get married. He was initially assigned to the art section, where he was instructed for three months by Mitsuki Nakamura, then section chief, to draw background art. However, Nakamura soon entrusted him with the design of the title logo for the new programme Science Ninja Team Gatchaman. Then, Nakamura, who was busy with both art and mecha design as well as running the section, started assigning him mecha design work in a supporting role. His name was listed in the end credits along with Nakamura's as 'Mechanical Design', and that was the moment when a 'mechanical designer' was born in the Japanese anime industry. (Note: Episode 59 features the characters Dr Ogawara and his assistant Nakamora, who are modelled after the two, although their positions are reversed from reality.)

He was originally scheduled to return to the art section and draw background art once Gatchaman finished. However, thanks to Tatsunoko Productions' continuous production of mecha action works such as Hurricane Polymar and Tekkaman: The Space Knight, he was able to continue his career as a mecha designer under Nakamura. (Note: Although his name is not in the credits, he was also somewhat involved with Casshan, as the person sitting at the desk next to him was selected as its staff and he assisted that person.) He designed his first main mecha in Gowappa 5 Gōdam. Until Tekkaman, Nakamura designed the main mecha and Okawara took care of the other sub-mechas, but Nakamura did not participate in this work and Okawara designed all the mecha, not just the main ones.

Okawara worked for Tatsunoko as an employee for three years and became a part-time designer in his fourth year. So he began to market himself to Sunrise, which had been on his radar for some time. He came up with a transformation mechanism for Invincible Steel Man Daitarn 3 in response to a request from Eiji Yamaura, head of Sunrise's planning office and later president, and actually made his own mockup and presented it to the sponsors. Negotiations went well and he began to receive orders from Sunrise afterwards. (Note: His repeated contacts with Yamaura during this period to learn about Sunrise's expertise in robot anime, which was the company's selling point, ultimately strengthened his relationship with Sunrise.)

Meanwhile, he continued to work with Tatsunoko after leaving the company, designing every guest mecha in Yatterman, the second series of Time Bokan series, and he replaced Nakamura to design the second main mecha, Yatterking, which appeared mid-series. He designed all the mecha from this onwards until the end of the series.

At the end of 1976, Nakamura left Tatsunoko, so Okawara co-founded Design Office Mechaman with him. Although Okawara still had less work (about one third of Nakamura's), he was paid the same salary as Nakamura because he had invested the same amount in the company as Nakamura. Okawara felt bad for Nakamura about it and went freelance a year later.

Okawara was in charge of mecha design for the 1979 Sunrise production Mobile Suit Gundam, directed by Yoshiyuki Tomino, and designed Mobile Suit (MS), the robots that appeared in the series. The die-cast metal character toys sold by Clover, the sponsor at the time of its broadcast, suffered poor sales and the show was discontinued. However, the programme gradually gained popularity through re-runs, and model magazines began to publish dioramas of battlefields created by readers using scratch-building techniques. Bandai took note of this and launched a plastic model kits in 1980, which became an unprecedented hit, causing a social phenomenon in which products continued to be out of stock nationwide. This was followed by the launch of the plastic model brand MSV (Mobile Suit Variations), a spin-off of the TV series designed by Okawara, and the boom continued until the mid-1980s.

Sunrise had commissioned designs from Studio Nue before Gundam, but animation director Yoshikazu Yasuhiko had disliked Studio Nue's insistence on sci-fi settings and their complex design proposals for some time, (Note: Those things were to increase the burden on the animators.) and wanted them removed from the project. That was why the emerging Mechaman, Okawara and Nakamura, (Note: Nakamura took part in the work as art director.) were chosen. (Note: The Mobile Suit Gundam project was driven by a combination of the concept of a Powered Suit from Robert A. Heinlein's Starship Troopers, which science fiction writer Haruka Takachiho, then head of Studio Nue, recommended to producer Yamaura, and a proposal brought in by Tomino. Therefore, Studio Nue would normally have been chosen.)

Okawara had joined the project halfway through, so the image of the work was not fully conveyed to him. So Yasuhiko first drew a rough design based on an illustration of a Powered Suit designed by Kazutaka Miyatake in the Japanese edition of Robert A. Heinlein's science fiction novel Starship Troopers. Okawara then drew a design based on the space suit motif, but both were rejected as not suitable for the lead role. Okawara proposed a new robot with a samurai motif, which was the original idea for Gundam. (Note: Tomino had sent him a note saying that he wanted to break away from the previous robot designs, which consisted of cylinders and square pillars, and that he wanted to do some authentic science fiction.) Yasuhiko modified that design overall, including covering the mouth with a mask, (Note: Okawara's design followed the trend of Super Robot as giant heroes up to that point. He had therefore drawn a mouth on its face, which Yasuhiko thought was strange.) cleaning up it, and changing its coloring, and the Gundam design was born. The sponsors wanted three different robots on the hero's side, so Okawara cleaned up Yasuhiko's design to create Guncannon, and then designed Guntank anew. While the design was being finalised, Okawara was taken by Yamaura to Clover to present the mechanism of the combined and transformable toy, which made a good impression on them.

Enemy robots, on the other hand, were generally not intended for commercialisation at the time, and sponsors had fewer restrictions. Tomino told Okawara that he could do whatever he wanted except for Mono-Eye, so he freely designed Zaku, Gouf, Dom, and other MS. When these enemy mecha, which were never intended to be toys, were released as plastic models, their design and concept, reminiscent of real weapons, met the demand of plastic model fans and became very popular. In the second half of the season, Tomino, who was getting into the swing of things, began to draw his own rough designs, and Okawara, who was busy with other work, began to clean up the designs as they were. For this reason, Okawara says that Tomino's contribution is also significant.

Okawara then went on to design many Real Robots for Sunrise's TV anime series in the 1980s. After Gundam he continued to work with Bandai on Combat Mecha Xabungle and Ginga Hyōryū Vifam. In those series, Okawara was now in a position to design the main mecha, while young designers such as Yutaka Izubuchi and Mamoru Nagano designed other sub-mechas.

Seeing Bandai's success, Takara approached Okawara to sell plastic model kits themselves, and they produced Fang of the Sun Dougram. Okawara designed the main robot, Combat Armour, without the human-like face and with a more military look than the Gundam. The plastic models sold so well that the TV series was extended and all CB Armour was included in the product line-up, as well as tanks, helicopters and even trailers. This gave Okawara even more challenging robot designs for the next Armored Trooper Votoms.

Okawara was initially not scheduled to participate in the second Gundam series, Mobile Suit Zeta Gundam, which was broadcast in 1985. This was because Tomino, who wanted to renew the design line, appointed Mamoru Nagano as the main designer, who alone would handle all the designs, including costumes and props, as well as the mecha. However, Nagano was removed from the Gundam design team before the show even started because of the sponsors' protests against his innovative designs. It was then decided that newcomer Kazumi Fujita would be selected and Okawara would return. While Fujita designed and cleaned up Zeta Gundam and other MS, Okawara designed the Gundam Mark II and several MS as a helper, and left the rest to younger workers. (Note: Although only the above three are credited as mecha designers, many designers were actually involved in MS design, including Makoto Kobayashi, Kazuhisa Kondo, Mika Akitaka, Hideo Okamoto, Katsushi Murakami, Koichi Ohata, Nobuyoshi Habara, Hiroki Hayashi, Studio Kemu and Vishal Design.)

Okawara did not participate in the subsequent Mobile Suit Gundam ZZ (Note: Only his name is credited, as his previous designs are the basis for the new designs.) and the film Mobile Suit Gundam: Char's Counterattack, and Tomino again appointed Nagano as the main designer. However, Nagano was not only removed as Gundam designer for both works, but was also dropped from his position as main designer. Makoto Kobayashi designed Gundam ZZ, and Yutaka Izubuchi designed Nu Gundam for Char's Counterattack. (Note: Many designers, including Shindosha (Mika Akitaka and Hideo Okamoto), Kazunobu Nakazawa, Masahisa Suzuki, Koichi Ohata, Yoshinori Sayama, Vishal Design, supported them by cleaning up designs and drawing rough designs for MS.)

In 1991, Okawara returned as the main mecha designer for Mobile Suit Gundam F91, in response to Sunrise's desire to return to its roots with the original staff. Since then, he has participated continuously in the Gundam series.

When the 1990s saw a renewed demand for Hero Robots to replace Real Robots of the 1980s, he responded by designing Brave series of robots. At the same time, he also designed comically deformed robots such as the 2-head high SD Gundam.

Okawara later expanded his activities beyond animation, working with industrial manufacturers and local authorities. In recent years, he has been active both in Japan and abroad, designing the mascot character Inagi Nansuke for his home city of Inagi, Tokyo, the futuristic micro-mobility Machina, figures for offers from abroad, and a head-mounted display with a small camera, a work by Mathieu Briand, which was exhibited at the 21st Century Museum of Contemporary Art, Kanazawa.

== History of works ==
(Listed chronologically)

- Science Ninja Team Gatchaman (1972–1974)

- Artist (enemy mechanical design)

- Hurricane Polymer (1974)

- Mechanical design (Tatsunoko Mechaman Design Office)

- Tekkaman: The Space Knight (1975)

- Mechanical design (Tatsunoko Mechaman Design Office)

- Gowappā 5 Godam (1976)

- Primary mechanical design (Tatsunoko Mechaman Design Office)

- Time Bokan (1976)
- Blocker Gundan IV: Machine Blaster (1976)
- Yattāman (1977)
- Mechander Robo (1977)
- Chōgattai Majutsu Robo Ginguiser (1977)
- Tobidase! Machine Hiryū (1977)
- Gekisō! Ruben Gaizer (1977)
- Invincible Steel Man Daitarn 3 (1978)

- Principal mechanical design
- Selected works: Daitarn 3

- Uchū Majin Daikengō (1978)
- Science Ninja Team Gatchaman II (1978)
- Mobile Suit Gundam (1979)

- Principal mechanical design
- Selected works: Gundam (mobile suit), MS-06 Zaku II

- Zendaman (1979)
- The Ultraman (1979)
- Science Ninja Team Gatchaman F (1979)
- Invincible Robo Trider G7 (1980)
- Time Patrol Tai Otasukeman (1980)
- Tondemo Senshi Muteking (1980)
- Fang of the Sun Dougram (1981)
- Yattodetaman (1981)
- Saikyō Robo Daiōja (1981)
- Doraemon: The Record of Nobita: Spaceblazer (1981)
- Kaitei Taisensō (1981)
- Combat Mecha Xabungle (1982)
- Gyakuten Ippatsu-man (1982)
- Armored Trooper Votoms (1983)

- Principal mechanical design
- Selected works: ATM-09-ST Scopedog

- Round Vernian Vifam (1983)
- Mirai Keisatsu Urashiman (1983)
- "Mobile Suit Variations" model kit line (1983)

- Principal mechanical design

- Panzer World Galient (1984)
- Chōriki Robo Galatt (1984)
- MS-X manga series (cancelled) (1984)

- Principal mechanical design

- Blue Comet SPT Layzner (1985)
- Mobile Suit Zeta Gundam (1985)

- Mechanical design
- Selected works: Gundam Mk-II

- Mobile Suit Gundam ZZ (1986)
- Metal Armor Dragonar (1987)
- Armor Hunter Mellowlink (1988)
- Mashin Eiyuuden Wataru (1988)
- Mado King Granzort (1989)
- Mobile Suit Gundam 0080: War in the Pocket (1989)
- Mobile Suit Gundam F90 model kit series (1990)
  - Principal mechanical design
- Brave Exkaiser (1990)

- Mechanical design
- Selected works: Exkaiser, King Exkaiser, Dragon Kaiser, Great Exkaiser

- The Brave Fighter of Sun Fighbird (1991)

- Mechanical design
- Selected works: Fighbird, Busou Gattai Fighbird, Granbird

- Mobile Suit Gundam F91 (1991)

- Mechanical design
- Selected works: F91 Gundam Formula 91

- Mobile Suit Gundam 0083: Stardust Memory (1991)
- The Brave Fighter of Legend Da-Garn (1992)

- Mechanical design
- Selected works: Da-Garn, Da-Garn X, Great Da-Garn GX

- Hero Senki: Project Olympus (1992)
- The Brave Express Might Gaine (1993)

- Mechanical design
- Selected works: Might Gaine, Great Might Gaine, Might Gunner, Great Might Gaine Perfect Mode

- Mobile Suit Victory Gundam (1993)

- Mechanical design

- Shippū! Iron Leaguer (1993)
- Brave Police J-Decker (1994)

- Mechanical design
- Selected works: Deckerd, J-Decker, Fire J-Decker

- Mobile Fighter G Gundam (1994)

- Mechanical design
- Selected works: GF13-017NJ Shining Gundam, GF13-017NJII God Gundam

- The Brave of Gold Goldran (1995)

- Mechanical design
- Selected works: Goldran, Great Goldran

- Mobile Suit Gundam Wing (1995)

- Mechanical design
- Selected works: XXXG-01W Wing Gundam, XXXG-00W0 Wing Gundam Zero

- Brave Command Dagwon (1996)

- Mechanical design
- Selected works: Fire Dag won, Super Fire Dagwon

- Mobile Suit Gundam: The 08th MS Team (1996)

- Mechanical design
- Selected works: RX-79[G] Gundam Mass Production Ground Type

- After War Gundam X (1996)

- Mechanical design
- Selected works: GX-9900 Gundam X

- Gundam Wing: Endless Waltz (1997)

- "Original Mechanical Designer" (actual mecha redesigned by Hajime Katoki)

- The King of Braves GaoGaiGar (1997)

- Principal mechanical design
- Selected works: GaoGaiGar

- Turn A Gundam (1999)

- Mechanical design

- Betterman (1999)
- Last Legion UX (1999)

- Promotional artwork

- Sunrise Eiyūtan (1999)
- The King of Braves GaoGaiGar Final (2000)

- Principal mechanical design
- Selected works: GaoFighGar, Genesic GaoGaiGar

- Time Bokan 2000: Kaitō Kiramekiman (2000)
- Gravion (2002)
- Mobile Suit Gundam SEED (2002)

- Mechanical design
- Selected works: ZGMF-X10A Freedom Gundam, ZGMF-1017 GINN, GAT-01 Strike Dagger.

- Kikō Busō G-Breaker (2002)
- Mobile Suit Gundam SEED X Astray (2003)

- Mechanical design
- Selected works: YMF-X000A Dreadnought Gundam, CAT1-X Hyperion Gundam

- Mobile Suit Gundam SEED Destiny (2004)

- Mechanical design
- Selected works: ZGMF-X56S Impulse Gundam

- Super Robot Wars GC (2004)

- "Original Mechanical Designer"

- "SYS*017" exhibit at 21st Century Museum of Contemporary Art, Kanazawa, Ishikawa (2004)

- Head-mounted display and control trigger design

- Mobile Suit Zeta Gundam A New Translation: Heirs to the Stars (2005)
- Mobile Suit Zeta Gundam A New Translation II: Lovers (2005)
- Mobile Suit Zeta Gundam A New Translation III: Love is the Pulse of the Stars (2006)
- Mobile Suit Gundam SEED C.E. 73: Stargazer (2006)
- Kishin Taisen Gigantic Formula (2007)

- Guest mechanical design
- Selected work: Chronos Zero

- Another Century's Episode 3: The Final (2007)

- Mechanical design of Falugen Custom, variation unit from Metal Armor Dragonar

- Mobile Suit Gundam 00 (2007)

- Mechanical design of GN-000 0 Gundam and others

- Mobile Suit Gundam Unicorn (2010)

- Original mechanical design (most of the actual mecha designs, including those for the eponymous mobile suit, were done by Hajime Katoki)

- World of Tanks Blitz (2016)
  - Guest mechanical design, O-47

War robots (2014)

designer for sword unit 190

When asked what the favorite of his works was during an interview, Okawara chose his designs for Shippū! Iron Leaguer.

== Art books ==
- Okawara, Kunio (November 20, 1989). Okawara Kunio Aian Wakusu (大河原邦男アイアンワークス) 'Kunio Okawara Iron Works'. Bandai. ISBN 4-8918-9462-8.

== Notes and references ==
=== Sources ===
- 永野護ロングインタビュー [Long interview with Mamoru Nagano]. Zeta Gundam Ace (in Japanese). Kadokawa Shoten. May 26, 2005.
- ファイブスター物語アウトライン [The five star stories outline] (in Japanese). Kadokawa Shoten. December 25, 2001. ISBN 978-4048534635.
- 機動戦士ガンダムMS大全集 [Mobile Suit Gundam MS Complete Works] (in Japanese). Bandai. February 1, 1988. ISBN 978-4891893361.
