= Gundam Evolve =

2004 television programme

ガンダムEVOLVE (Gandamu Iborubu)
- Genre: Comedy, Drama, Thriller, Mecha
- Original video animation
- Directed by: Various
- Studio: Sunrise
- Licensed by: NA: Sunrise
- Released: 2001 – 2007
- Episodes: 15

Gundam Evolve (ガンダムEVOLVE, Gandamu Iborubu), also known as Mobile Suit Gundam Evolve, is a series of promotional short films set in the different timelines of the Gundam series. Originally there were only five Evolve episodes, produced from 2001 to 2003, Bandai created ten more Evolve episodes from 2004 to 2007. While the first two episodes took place in the Universal Century, some of the later clips also showed Gundams from the other timelines.

The clips show alternative scenes, side-stories or omakes for fans. The clips feature a mix of animation media which vary from traditional animation to 3D rendering to cel-shaded animation. The target is to show the Gundams and other mobile suits in high-quality CGI. A total of 15 shorts were released and later compiled in three separate volumes, namely Gundam Evolve ../+ ("Plus"), Gundam Evolve ../Ω ("Omega") and Gundam Evolve ../Α ("Alpha"). Each volume consists of 5 episodes.

The logo features a battered Core Fighter floating upside down, as seen on the final episode of the original Mobile Suit Gundam series.

== Episode summaries ==
=== 01 – RX-78-2 Gundam ===
This episode is the only one that features no CG. Instead it is a short clip show of the original Mobile Suit Gundam series. In this episode Amuro Ray, waiting to start in the final battle of A Baoa Qu, sits in his RX-78-2 Gundam while the other forces are already fighting. He recalls many of the battles he has fought until now, beginning with his fight against the mobile armor Elmeth when he killed Lalah Sune. Afterward he recalls the battle against the Black Tri-Stars, Ramba Ral and Char Aznable. He also thinks about the people important to him who died, including Ryu Jose, Matilda Ajan and Sleggar Law. Then he hears Sayla Mass who tells him that if they can overcome war, humanity should as well. Soon afterward, Amuro launches.

=== 02 – RX-178 Gundam Mk-II ===
The events of this episode take place after the Gryps Conflict. The story revolves around a video tape which is sent to Kamille Bidan by Argama chief engineer Astonaige Medoz. On the video Astonaige wishes him a quick recovery and it also contains a video scene from a battle training at which Kamille participated during the Gryps Conflict. In the training he uses the Gundam Mk.II to fight against several drones and two Rick Dias in a combat simulation. Although he thinks it is too easy, he accidentally destroys the camera probe recording the training. The episode ends with a written report by Kamille apologizing over damaging the surveillance pod, in which he angrily wrote in later sections denying himself of any responsibility for the incident, protesting over having to write such a formal apology at all, and going further on to accuse his superiors Quattro Bajeena and Henken Bekkener of being totally irrational and incompetent.

=== 03 – GF13-017NJII God Gundam ===
The third Evolve clip is about G Gundam. It features Domon Kasshu, who is practicing tai chi with the God Gundam. However suddenly Rain Mikamura appears in the Rising Gundam and attacks him because he was away for two days. He tells her he was only training but she believes that he was off chasing skirts, and the two fight. Trying to end the battle, Domon attacks with the God Gundam's God Finger (actually the Sekiha Tenkyo-Ken), causing Rain to counter with the Rising Gundam's Rising Finger (actually Rising's own rendition of the Sekiha Tenkyo-Ken) attack. Both attacks clash together with an immense power, but Rain's attack breaks through. When the smoke clears, Rising Gundam is performing Tai Chi while God Gundam looks on, with insults like "Womanizer" and "Lazy Bum" written all over its head.

(Note that nothing within the actual G Gundam series implies Rising can perform a Finger attack in the manner shown; in the series, the Rising Gundam's strongest attack is the Rising Arrow, which is fired from the beam bow on its left arm. Likewise, Rain being able to outmatch Domon in actual Gundam combat seems strictly for comedy. However, the design documents of the Rising Gundam do include a Rising Finger attack at well, though Rain is never shown to have trained to use it.)

=== 04 – RX-78 GP03 Dendrobium ===
After the last clip played in the Future Century, this episode returns to the Universal Century. It is revealed that several people leaked information about the Gundam Development Project to the Zeon Forces because Jamitov Hymem dislikes it. Afterwards a ruined MS-14A Gelgoog is shown floating in space after a group of Gelgoog Marine Types and MS-06F Zaku II mobile suits attack the La Vie en Rose. To counter them a woman named Defrah Kar pilots the Gundam GP03 Dendrobium Stamen to destroy them. To make this easier she uses the Orchis platform and, thanks to its powerful weapons, is easily able to destroy them, and thanks to her I-field she is even able to defend herself from the attack of a large battleship. However, after the battle and while ejecting the Stamen from the Orchis, a severely damaged Gelgoog is able to shoot at the cockpit of the Stamen, killing Defrah and incidentally destroying the experimental cockpit. Afterwards the people who looked on the Gundam data examine the data of the GP04 Gerbera. This animation may explain the confusion concerning the two types of cockpits for the Stamen unit.

=== 05 – RX-93 ν Gundam ===
This episode shows a bright alternative scenario for Quess Paraya from Char's Counterattack, as Tomino's attitude during Char's Counterattack was rather grim and depressing. The episode begins with Quess, who had apparently used the NZ-333 Alpha Azieru to severely damage Hathaway Noa's RGM-89 Jegan. Afterwards Amuro Ray in his RX-93 Nu Gundam has a Newtype reaction to her and confronts her. He accuses her of not understanding Hathaway's feelings, but Quess does not listen and attacks him. However Amuro is able to trap her inside the Fin Funnel's beam barriers. Afterwards they hear Hathaway who tells Quess not to be angry, and Amuro tells Quess that Hathaway is not dead. Thanks to this and Amuro's words she calms down and she finally uses the Alpha Azieru to rescue Hathaway.

This episode was written by Yoshiyuki Tomino, whose change of outlook used this animation to give Quess a happy ending as an alternative to her death in the film.

=== 06 – YMF-X000A Dreadnought Gundam ===
The clip starts off with a battle between the YMF-X000A Dreadnought and several ZGMF-600 GuAIZ. Although Prayer Reverie tells them that he does not want to fight they continue and one of them slams him in an asteroid. Suddenly a DRAGOON-equipped Dreadnought "ghost" appears, separates itself from the real Dreadnought and attacks the GuAIZ, destroying all of them very easily. Afterwards it fires all its weapons on the real Dreadnought but the attack is stopped by the CAT1-X1/3 Hyperion. Then the two suits battle and finally Prayer joins the fight and together with the Hyperion he destroys the "ghost". At last the two suits turn their weapons on each other. In the end, this turned out to be a dream of Prayer's, foreshadowing his eventual battle with the Hyperion.

=== 07 - XXXG-00W0 Wing Gundam Zero ===
This episode begins with a figure in a spacesuit (Heero Yuy) setting bombs, then fades to Gundam engineer Doctor J, apparently imprisoned. He talks to a shadowy visitor about history and his young protege as the person in space suit tries to escape the facility he has just sabotaged. The guards catch up to him, but he uses a nearby Virgo II mobile doll to distract them and escape to his machine - Wing Zero. Heero uses the twin buster rifle to break out of the base's hangar, but loses the weapon in the escape and resorts to using a Virgo II beam rifle. He is chased by several Virgo IIs along the length of the facility, which is actually a gigantic colony cannon. After dealing with his pursuit, Heero attacks the cannon directly with his beam rifle as the bombs begin to go off. Doctor J finishes his narration, commenting to his visitor (now revealed as Relena Peacecraft) that he chose Heero's codename personally. As the colony cannon explodes, Heero flies away to his next mission.

Gundam Evolve 7 was written and directed by Shukou Murase, who was character designer for the original Gundam Wing series. The original Japanese voice actors are used; Hikaru Midorikawa for Heero Yuy and Minoru Inaba for Doctor J. The 3D animation was based on Bandai's Master Grade "Wing Gundam Zero - Endless Waltz" model.

This Evolve's place within Mobile Suit Gundam Wing continuity is unclear, but it appears to take place during the last story arc of the series, after White Fang captures Relena but before Doctor J dies. During this period, Heero was working with the other four Gundam pilots; their absence from this mission is a source of much of this confusion. However, the event is mentioned in secret documents at the beginning of the novel New Mobile Report Gundam Wing: Frozen Teardrop, where it was stated to take place in the spring of A.C. 196, after the TV series and before Endless Waltz.

=== 08 - GAT-X105 Strike Gundam ===
In a secret ZAFT desert base, the Aile Strike Gundam faces off against several GINN OCHER Types. The animation adapted the style of visual special effect seen in The Matrix, and featured the Grand Slam Sword included with the Perfect Grade and later Master Grade Strike Gundam model kits.

=== 09 - MSZ-006 Zeta Gundam ===
Although numbered 9, this Evolve is the last to come out in Gundam Evolve ../Ω. It is said to feature three Zeta Gundams, three pilots with the aliases Red Snake, Grey Wolf, and White Unicorn as well as an enormous MA of unknown affiliation in orbit. There is also the mentioning of the Chakra Laboratory of AEUG/Karaba and a top-secret mission.

Red Snake's Zeta Gundam is red, with redesigned armour on the chest, feet, skirt and lower leg. The new armour sports a spiked look. In addition, the wings are wider and pointed, and there is a large vertical spike behind its head, apparently protruding from the middle of its back. The pilot apparently is a young Newtype girl named Yurii Ajissah, who holds a special feeling towards her squadron leader, White Unicorn.

White Unicorn is believed to be the ace Amuro Ray, based on the physical appearance, personal logo, military ranking, Yurii's memory of their encounter at Side 6 during the One Year War, and Toru Furuya being the character's voice actor. His Zeta Gundam unit appears to be the same one that Amuro piloted in the short CGI film Green Divers (white with purple stripes, plus Amuro's signature "A" symbol on the left shoulder armour).

Grey Wolf's Zeta Gundam (nicknamed "Buster Zeta") unit is a yellow colour with two additional fins/airfoils on its upper back. Grey Wolf is unhappy with his machine's colors and would have preferred it to be grey. This, coupled with his nickname, his "Grey Wolf" logo (which is actually a white wolf head) and the fact that he is a former Zeon pilot, seems to imply that Grey Wolf is actually Zeon ace pilot Shin Matsunaga, the infamous "White Wolf of Solomon". Similarly, the original pilot of Red Snake's Zeta is implied to be Johnny Ridden, who was reassigned since Red Zeta is a Newtype-use machine.

=== 10 - MSZ-010 ZZ Gundam ===
Judau is assigned to protect/escort the space transport ship Jupitris on his birthday. While on the recovery missions he encounters Neo Zeon forces pursuing an AMX-004-3 Quebeley MK.II. Seeing the Quebeley posing no threat, Judau decides to come to its aid, despite his ZZ-GR being designed for space operations and not battle. During the battle a "present" cargo rocket from Judau's sister Leina arrives, and is revealed to be an improved version of the original ZZ Gundam's B-Parts, allowing Judau to fight off the attackers and save the Quebeley's pilot.

In the end, the pilot of the Qubeley is seen to be a Ple clone. The magazine Gundam Ace stated that she is one of the only two surviving Ple clones of the final battle in ZZ, the other being Ple 12.

=== 11 – RB-79 Ball ===
Novice Federation pilot Hiden and a few other survey the recent battle ground of A Baoa Qu in a squad of RB-79 Ball. Word comes in that Zeon remnants are about to attack. Though afraid, the young pilots proceed through the silent interiors of A Baoa Qu. Without warning, gunshots echo through the air and Hiden's party is killed one-by-one. When Hiden, the sole survivor, finally destroys the enemy, he discovers that it was piloted by a young woman, whose body floats by him. In the ending credits, the cockpit of his Ball is empty.

The plot of this episode closely parallels a real-world encounter in Germany, May 1945. An American convoy is bombarded with an 88mm cannon hidden in rubble after Germany surrendered. Claud Amensen, a war correspondent and Lt. Ronald Bourbon, a soldier, reported that the cannon was operated by a 15-year-old Hitlersjungen girl. She surrendered when she ran out of ammo, and was brought to a German police office later, never heard from again.

=== 12 – RMS-099 Rick Dias ===
Quattro Bajeena boards his Rick Dias for a battle simulation to transfer combat data to the mass-production model. The data personnel has some fun with him, turning the Rick Dias's monitor red, revealing his own old Zaku from his "Red Comet" days as his opponent. Quattro is gradually cornered by the Zaku... Can he win against the legendary Red Comet?

And then he switches to the Hyaku Shiki, and faces off with an old rival...

=== 13 - RMS-108 Marasai ===
As the AEUG attempt to enter the atmosphere for the drop operation on Jaburo, they come under attack by the Titans' Marasai mobile suits. An orbital battle ensues...

The storyline of this clip centers around a young Titans pilot named Jonathan, as he deals with the battle and his difficult personal affairs at the same time.

=== 14 - Rekka Musha Gundam ===
As evil Zaku bandits terrorise the country of Ark. Rekka Musha Gundam comes to the rescue chasing their leader Mazaku for the Scroll of Light he had stolen. Stopping briefly at a teahouse, Rekka informs three young kids about the Seven of Light Gundam team he leads. Suddenly Mazaku's Gelgoog minions set the building on fire. After defeating the minions, Mazaku appears and uses the Scroll to transform into the gigantic Hadou Musha Mazaku. Rekka is easily defeated by his gigantic and powerful foe. The children prepare to surrender but Rekka stands up and cries out. His noble spirit causes the Scroll to abandon Mazaku and give Rekka its true power, giving him the Armour of Light. With his new power and cheered on by the children, Rekka slices Mazaku in half and saves the day.

The episode's kanji title "頑駄無 異歩流武" (ガンダム イボルブ) is actually a pun similar to Lady Mondegreen, and is read as "Gan Da Mu I Bo Ru Bu", namely "Gundam Evolve".

=== 15 - The Newtype: Challia Bull ===
The short is a re-imagined version of episode 39 of the original TV series with updated mechanical designs.

Challia Bull was found to have the attributes of a Newtype during his activities in the Jupiter Energy Fleet. While doubtful of his own abilities, he is recruited and assigned by commander-in-chief Gihren to serve in Char Aznable's combat unit under Kycilia's command. Even as he senses the girl he met, known as Lalah Sune, to be something of a Newtype, the fierce combat with the Federation ace-piloted Gundam changed his convictions...

== Music ==
- Black Stars by Sumitada Azumano (Evolve 6, 7)
- SOLDIER -Kanashimi No Shi- by Chino (Evolve 8)
- Konnamon Janai! by Shoichiro Hirata (Evolve 10)
- TIME IS ON MY SIDE by LISA (Evolve 11)
- Owaranu Mirai by Jiro Kawakami (Episode 13)
- shift by Sachiko Tsujimoto (Evolve 14)
- Jet Black Eyes (from G Gundam OST 1) by Kohei Tanaka (Evolve 03)

== DVD release ==
- Gundam Evolve../+ - Evolve 1-5 (9/6/2003); Re-release (5/25/2007)
- Gundam Evolve../Ω - Evolve 6-10 (10/27/2006)
- Gundam Evolve../α - Evolve 11-15 (1/26/2007)
