= Bar Lemon Heart =

Japanese manga series and television drama

- Bar Lemon Hart
- Cover of the first volume of Bar Lemon Hart

BARレモン・ハート
- Manga
- Written by: Mitsutoshi Furuya and Family Kikaku
- Published by: Futabasha
- Magazine: Manga Action
- Original run: 1985 – 16 Nov 2021
- Volumes: 37
- Television drama
- Directed by: Riku Furuya
- Produced by: Shūhei Ueno (executive); Sora Kobayashi; Takeyasu Nishigata; Yūichi Takasugi
- Written by: Mitsutoshi Furuya (manga); Tatsuro Inamoto; Misuzu Chiba; Tomoki Kanazawa; Munenori Mizuno; Ayako Katō
- Music by: Yōgo Shindō
- Studio: BS Fuji; NEXTEP
- Original network: BS Fuji
- Original run: October 5, 2015 – September 26, 2016
- Episodes: 32
- Live-action television film
- Original network: BS Fuji
- Released: March 24, 2017 – December 29, 2020

Bar Lemon Hart (BARレモン・ハート, Bā Remon Hāto), sometimes referred to as "Bar Lemon Heart," is a Japanese manga series written and illustrated by Mitsutoshi Furuya and Family Kikaku and published by Futabasha from 1985 to 2021. A Japanese television drama series based on the manga premiered in October 2015 on BS Fuji and had 6 episodes. A second season consisting of 26 episodes aired from April to September 2016.

== Plot ==
Stories in Bar Lemon Hart typically feature three recurring characters: Lemon Hart's proprietor and two of his regular customers, Megane-san and Matchan. Each chapter generally introduces the reader to either one specific brand of alcohol (ex., Lemon Hart Demerara rum 151 proof), one variety of alcohol or cocktail (ex., chablis or gimlet), or one generic type of alcohol (ex., beer), although some chapters occasionally present multiple types of alcohol. These drinks are usually used to help solve a character's problems. For example, a customer who is being transferred to a Chinese branch of his company may learn about different types of baijiu, or a customer who has divorced his or her partner may learn their partner's true feelings after receiving a specific bottle of alcohol. A history lesson about each featured drink is also included in each chapter.

The title is derived from Lemon Hart rum, which is produced by Hart & Son rum purveyors. Lemon Hart's barkeeper has referred to Lemon Hart 151 as the "world's strongest alcohol," although there are higher proof alcohols available on the market. The title is sometimes written as "Bar Lemon Heart," since the word ハート (Hāto) could be written as "Hart" or "Heart" in English. Both spellings appear on official merchandise.

The catchphrase 気持ちがすっごくあったかい！！ (kimochi ga suggoku attakai!!/It's very heartwarming!!) has been used for the series since Volume 4.

== Characters ==
=== Main characters ===
Master (マスター, Masutā)
Portrayed by: Nakamura Baijaku II
The owner of Lemon Hart. "Master" is a term that is commonly used to refer to a proprietor of a bar in Japan. His real name is unknown, although he has also been referred to as Unchiku-sensei (蘊蓄先生/Professor Knowledge) due to his vast knowledge of anything alcohol related. He became a bartender after quitting the company that he joined once he graduated college after working there for one month. He decided to become a bartender by chance after he walked into a bar in Sendai that was run by a very strict owner whom he decided to train under. He commonly wears a bowtie, vest, dress shirt, and slacks. He keeps his bar well-stocked and has hundreds of varieties of alcohol on hand. He is brought to tears when he tastes extremely high-quality alcohol or when he is asked to serve alcohol that is no longer available commercially. He will go to great lengths to ensure that his customers are satisfied, including flying to foreign countries to buy the specific alcohol that they want. He typically treats his customers with a kind and warm-hearted demeanor, although he will occasionally get mad at his regulars. He was originally introduced in Mitsutoshi Furuya's previous work Dame Oyaji.
Megane-san (メガネさん, Meganesan)
Portrayed by: Kazuhisa Kawahara
A frequent customer of Lemon Hart. Very little is known about his personal history. His name literally means "Mr. Glasses," which refers to the fact that he is never seen without his trademark dark-tinted sunglasses. He also wears a trench coat and a fedora. His work frequently takes him overseas, and he could possibly be a spy. He is very knowledgeable about alcohol, and his preferred drinks are Western alcoholic beverages such as whiskey, cognac, and wine. His favorite type of alcohol is gin. He is able to sense when Master has purchased a rare alcohol no matter how well he tries to hide it. He was originally introduced in Mitsutoshi Furuya's previous work Dame Oyaji.
Matchan (Matsuda) (松ちゃん (松田), Matchan (Matsuda))
Portrayed by: Satoru Matsuo
A frequent customer of Lemon Hart. His first name has been listed as Jirō, Ryōhei, and Matsukichi, but his true first name is unclear. Both Master and Megané-san refer to him using his nickname "Matchan," which is a diminutive form of the last name Matsuda. His most distinguishable trait is his mustache. He works as a freelance writer and copywriter for multiple magazines. His knowledge of alcoholic beverages is very limited, which is why he frequently asks Master for assistance. He is known for not being able to taste the difference between different types of alcohol or determine whether or not they are good. His preferred drink is Suntory whiskey diluted with oolong tea. He would like to be in a relationship, but he is generally unsuccessful with women. He has multiple siblings, nieces, and nephews, and he has brought some of them to Lemon Hart.

=== Recurring Characters ===
Toshi-chan (トシちゃん, Toshichan)

Full name unknown. When he first visited Lemon Hart, he was an arrogant self-proclaimed expert of bourbon. His attitude changed once his lack of knowledge was called out by Megane-san. Toshi-chan's initial arrogance reminded Megane-san as a younger version of himself, and they develop a mentor/mentee relationship. Toshi-chan commonly wears a baseball cap. He brings multiple girls on dates to Lemon Hart and appears to be a bit of a playboy. He is initially referred to as the bourbon kid (バーボン小僧, bābonkozō). His nickname changes based on his current obsession (ex., whiskey kid, scotch kid, Chablis kid).

Oden shop owner (おでん屋の親父, Odenya no oyaji)

Real name unknown, but has been referred to as Denroku (伝六). He runs a small oden cart. He is very knowledgeable about alcohol and has many discussions about it with Master. It is implied that he was a bartender before he owned his oden cart. His most distinguishable trait is his bald head and headband.

Chiyoko Okano (岡野千代子, Okano Chiyoko)

Matchan's niece. She is an editor for the Oishī Nichiyōbi (おいしい日曜日/"Tasty Sunday") magazine. Chiyoko can be recognized by her bob cut. Her bubbly personality and exuberance often annoy her uncle, but she still greatly respects him and calls him Matsu-ojisama (松おじさま).

== Media ==
=== Manga ===
Bar Lemon Hart has been serialized in Manga Action since 1985. On 4 January 2022, Manga Action published an obituary for Mitsutoshi Furuya in lieu of a new chapter, and the magazine has been rerunning previous chapters since then. Futabasha has compiled it into 37 volumes. The final volume was published in December 2022, and it contains previously unpublished chapters, an obituary, and unfinished layouts of planned chapters. AK (ACE Communications) is the publisher of the Korean language version of the manga.

=== Television ===
A television series based on Bar Lemon Hart was produced for Fuji TV. Storylines were drawn directly from the manga. Season one contained six episodes, while season two contained 26 episodes. Each episode contains two unique stories, as well as a lesson on alcoholic beverages. Many episodes also contain interviewers with Japanese bar proprietors. Six two-hour TV specials were also produced between 2017 and 2020.

==== Cast ====
- Nakamura Baijaku II as Master
- Kazuhisa Kawahara as Megane-san
- Satoru Matsuo as Matsuda
- Teruhiko Saigō
- Kenji Matsuda
- Yoichi Nukumizu
- Maiko
- Yosuke Asari
- Izou Oikawa
- Azusa Inamura
- Takako Hayashi
- Megumi Mori

=== Other media ===
While the series has never been officially released in English, select panels were used in Mangajin and Japanese the Manga Way to provide Japanese language students real-world examples of common Japanese phrases and grammatical structures.

== Physical Location ==
A physical Bar Lemon Hart is located in Nerima city in Tokyo. It is owned and operated by Family Kikaku and Mitsutoshi Furuya until his death in 2021.
