= Club 9 =

Japanese manga series

- First tankōbon volume cover

へば!ハローちゃん (Heba! Heroo-Chan!)
- Genre: Romantic comedy; Slice of life
- Manga
- Written by: Makoto Kobayashi
- Published by: Kodansha
- English publisher: NA: Dark Horse Comics
- Magazine: Mr. Magazine
- Original run: 1991 – 1994
- Volumes: 5

Club 9, known in Japan as Heba! Hello-chan! (Japanese: へば!ハローちゃん, Hepburn: Heba! Heroo-Chan!), is a Japanese manga series written and illustrated by Makoto Kobayashi. It was serialized in Kodansha's seinen manga magazine Mr. Magazine from 1991 to 1994, with its chapters collected in five wideban volumes. In North America, the manga was licensed for English release by Dark Horse Comics and published entirely in their Super Manga Blast! manga anthology magazine; however, only three out of the five collected volumes were released.

== Plot ==
Club 9 centers around a young country girl named Haruo Hattori who is attending university in Tokyo, Japan. She initially lives in her college dorm, but due to circumstances has to move out to an apartment and find a job. When a friend gives her a job as a club hostess at a posh Ginza hostess bar (Club 9), she finds herself getting more attention than she initially wanted.

== Characters ==
Haruo Hattori
Simple, kind, and honest, Haruo is the type of character that easily finds herself in situations before she even realizes that she's in them. Haruo left her small country town in the Akita prefecture to attend college in the big city of Tokyo. While she was in high school she had a loyal boyfriend and managed the school's baseball team. Haruo is incredibly clumsy at times, which often is a result of her trying to help people while not watching the road ahead of her. Haruo initially lived in the dorm rooms of her college, but had to move out after a male ghost kept trying to get her to sleep with him. She found a job with the help of a college friend, Aki, at a local hostess club. Haruo is given the "stage name" of Miss Hello, and her sweet kindness often attracts more attention than she intends to get. She is a big fan of Makoto Kobayashi, a manga writer who is also a member of the club. Her big goal is to go home to her boyfriend a virgin. In the end Haruo quits Club 9 and becomes just a regular college student. She spends two weeks as a student teacher before graduating. At the series end she has accepted a job as a school teacher in her home town and is reunited with Kingoro. She tells him that she was able to stay a virgin for him, and as the two of them drive off it is heavily implied that they are going to have their "first time" together.
Aki Shinohara
Street-wise, sexy, but with a heart of gold, Aki is one of the first to befriend Haruo. She initially allowed Haruo to room with her after her unfortunate run-in with the campus ghost, but pushed her to get an apartment of her own. Aki is often at wit's end whenever Haruo says or does something to show how unaware she is of the surrounding city. One of Aki's dreams is to one day set up a hostess club of her own. Aki thinks nothing of using a man in order to get what she wants (new clothes, jewelry, or a free vacation). This way of thinking would later cause one of her male patrons to aggressively stalk her. After graduation she fulfills her dream of opening a hostess club of her own.
Fuyumi
Fuyumi is a sweet but somewhat naive girl. She is somewhat more street-smart than Haruo, but is less so than Aki. She works at Club 9 along with Aki and Haruo. Fuyumi has a crush on an actor that frequents the bar, and has hinted that her working relationship has progressed beyond the professional level. After graduation she fulfills her dream of marrying her actor sweetheart, with plans to have children immediately.
Mama (Club 9 owner)
She is an older woman who greatly resembles Haruo's own mother. Mama is incredibly sensitive about her age, and often acts in complete denial of it. She shares many characteristics with Haruo's real mother, in that they both act carefree, a bit flighty, but have the best interests for their charges at heart. Mama has an ongoing rivalry with a fellow giza hostess bar called Club Freeman. At the series end she can be seen headhunting while in drag at Club Freeman.
Kingoro
Kingoro is Haruo's country boyfriend, and was also the pitcher for their successful high school baseball team. When he fails to be picked at the pro draft, he then sets his sights to becoming a great apple farmer. He truly loves Haruo, but is unable to go to Tokyo with her. He often tries to contact her, but never gets a chance to meet her. At the series end he has succeeded in his goal of becoming a great apple farmer, and has made his own special breed of apples, which he named after Haruo.
Kyosuke Hanazono
An insanely wealthy businessman, he first meets Haruo when she is fetching snacks for the Club 9 patrons. Mistaking him for unemployed and penniless, she purchases food for him unaware that he was unable to purchase anything since he only had large bills and credit cards on him. Hanazono is attracted to Haruo and showers her with expensive gifts, including a custom made sports car. In the manga he says that he was previously in a serious relationship with another woman, but his mother drove her off. After Haruo rejects his proposal, Hanazono uses Haruo (with her cooperation) to trick his mother into accepting the woman he originally wanted to marry.
Lewis
Manga artist of the popular manga 'Lonely Boy', he falls for Haruo's kindness. When he fails to win a coveted award, Haruo gives him the drive to continue his series. He also asks for Haruo's hand in marriage, but is kindly turned down by her. The next year he wins the award.
Makoto Konbayashi
Haruo's favorite manga artist and author of the manga What's Bear. His character is a parody of the actual manga artist of the series (his fictional manga is also a parody of one of Kobayashi's other series, What's Michael?; Bear is the canine companion of the manga's lead feline, Michael.) He is often seen drawing his animals on the skin of the Club 9 hostesses.
Koji Uryu
Lead pitcher for the Lions, Haruo and Kingoro's favorite pro baseball team. He was in a slump, and spent much of his time drinking and carousing as a result. He came into Club 9 to drink, but was denied alcohol from Haruo on the premise that it ruined his pitching skills. After listening to a speech by Haruo he agreed to only drink the sports drinks she provided. He is another of Haruo's numerous admirers. He is knocked down to the middle leagues after his pitching slump, but is cheered on by Haruo. After an elbow surgery he succeeds in regaining his former glory.
Mama and Pa Hattori
The parents of Haruo. They live in a small rural town in Akita, and are presumably farmers. Pa is a silent and patient man, while Mama is excitable and flighty. She often woke Haruo up by diving on top of her. Mama is identical in appearance to the owner of Club 9.
Chinatsu
At the beginning of the story, she is Club 9's number one hostess. She is beautiful, refined, and attends a high-class woman's university in Tokyo. Chinatsu's weakness is that, after having the slightest amount of alcohol, she becomes arrogant, abusive, mocking, and truthful about her feelings for her male clients. Sayadoshi Iwata, a toilet company president, is the usual target of her venting as he believes that making Chinatsu drink alcohol will make her more open to seduction. Unfortunately, it leaves Mr. Iwata with graffiti on his forehead, messed up clothing, chocolate sticks up his nose, and a humiliating tirade. Chinatsu is also flat chested and, when drunk, she feels inadequate about her bust and wishes she had larger breasts, backing up her feelings by grabbing either the larger bosoms of Aki or Haruo.
Rumi, Yuki, Kiyoko and Kyoko
Four other ginza girls and hostesses working at Club 9 at the beginning of the story. They are frequently seen in the background of scenes set at the club throughout.

== Publication ==
Written and illustrated by Makoto Kobayashi, Club 9 was serialized in Kodansha's seinen manga magazine Mr. Magazine from 1991 to 1994. Its 42 chapters were collected in five wideban volumes, released from April 1992 to February 1994. Kodansha republished the series in three volumes from February 23 to April 23, 2004.

In North America, the manga was licensed for English release by Dark Horse Comics; they published it in their Super Manga Blast! manga anthology magazine from July 4, 2001, to September 7, 2005, and released three collected volumes from February 12, 2003, to April 20, 2005; however, they did not release the two remaining volumes.
