= Japanese in Mangaland =

Japanese language learning book series

Japanese in Mangaland: Learning the Basics cover (English version).

Japanese in MangaLand (Japanese: マンガで日本語) is a series of educational books by Marc Bernabé designed to help teach Japanese using original, untranslated manga. Originally published in Spanish as Japonés en viñetas, it has since had translated versions published in English, German, French, Catalan, Italian, and Portuguese. There are three main books along with two workbooks.

Kanji in MangaLand (マンガで漢字) is a series for learning 1,006 basic kanji (ideogram) characters.

== Publications ==
=== Japanese in MangaLand series ===
- Japanese in MangaLand: Learning the Basics/Japanese in MangaLand: Basic Japanese Course Using Manga:

- 1st edition by Japan Publications Trading (Japanese in Mangaland: Learning the Basics/Japanese in Mangaland: Basic Japanese Course Using Manga) (ISBN 4-88996-115-1/ISBN 978-4-88996-115-7):

- ?th impression (March 12, 2004)

- Bilingual (Spanish/Japanese) edition by Norma Editorial Sa (Japonés en viñetas: Curso basico de japonés a traves del manga) (ISBN 849632538-5/ISBN 978-849632538-8)

- ?th impression (July 30, 2007)

- Japanese in MangaLand: Workbook 1:

- Japan Publications Trading edition (ISBN 4-88996-208-5/ISBN 978-4-88996-208-6)

- ?th impression (November 3, 2006)

- Japanese in MangaLand 2: Basic to Intermediate Level:

- Bilingual edition by Japan Publications Trading (ISBN 4-88996-186-0/ISBN 978-4-88996-186-7):

- ?th impression (September 2, 2005)

- Japanese in MangaLand 3: Intermediate Level:

- 1st edition by Japan Publications Trading (ISBN 4-88996-187-9/ISBN 978-4-88996-187-4):

- ?th impression (April 7, 2006)

=== Kanji in MangaLand series ===
- Kanji in MangaLand Volume 1

- bilingual edition (ISBN 4-88996-221-2/ISBN 978-4-88996-221-5)

- ?th impression (November 16, 2007)

- Kanji in MangaLand Volume 2: Basic to Intermediate Kanji Course through Manga

- bilingual edition (ISBN 4-88996-261-1/ISBN 978-4-88996-261-1)

- ?th impression (October 4, 2009)

== See also ==
- Japanese the Manga Way
- Mangajin
