= Judo-bu Monogatari =

Japanese manga series

- First tankōbon volume cover

柔道部物語
- Genre: Martial arts
- Manga
- Written by: Makoto Kobayashi
- Published by: Kodansha
- Imprint: Yanmaga KC Special
- Magazine: Weekly Young Magazine
- Original run: 1985 – 1991
- Volumes: 11
- Original video animation
- Directed by: Hidetoshi Omori
- Studio: Studio Deen
- Released: March 25, 1991 – June 25, 1991
- Runtime: 50 minutes
- Episodes: 2
- icon

Judo-bu Monogatari (柔道部物語; lit. 'Judo Club Story') is a Japanese manga series written and illustrated by Makoto Kobayashi. It was serialized in Kodansha's seinen manga magazine Weekly Young Magazine from 1985 to 1991, with its chapters collected in 11 tankōbon volumes. A two-episode original video animation (OVA) adaptation was released in 1991. Another manga series created by Kobayashi and Olympic gold medalist judoka, Yuko Emoto, titled JJM: Joshi Judou-bu Monogatari, started in 2016.

== Media ==
=== Manga ===
Written and illustrated by Makoto Kobayashi, Judo-bu Monogatari was serialized in Kodansha's seinen manga magazine Weekly Young Magazine from 1985 to 1991. Kodansha collected its chapters in 11 tankōbon volumes, released from June 15, 1987, to August 13, 1991.

A related manga series, titled JJM: Joshi Judou-bu Monogatari (JJM 女子柔道部物語; "Women's Judo Club Story"), with an original story by Yuko Emoto, 1996 Atlanta Olympic Women's Judo-61 kg gold medalist, featuring a female protagonist, started in Kodansha's Evening on August 9, 2016.

=== Original video animation ===
A two-episode original video animation (OVA) adaptation by Studio Deen was released on VHS from March 25 to June 25, 1991.
