= Last Legion UX =

1999 video game

- Developer: Yuke's
- Publisher: Hudson Soft
- Director: Shuichiro Nishiya
- Producers: Hidetoshi Endo; Norifumi Hara
- Programmers: Shintaro Matsubara; Yukinori Taniguchi; Sumiaki Kawasaki
- Artists: Yutaka Maekawa; Katsushi Baba
- Composer: Yoshitaka Azuma
- Platform: Nintendo 64
- Release: JP: May 28, 1999
- Genres: Fighting, shooting
- Modes: Single player, multiplayer

Last Legion UX (Note: Japanese: ラストレジオンＵＸ, Hepburn: Rasuto Rejion UX) is a fighting game for the Nintendo 64, developed by Yuke's and published by Hudson Soft. It features one-on-one battles between human-piloted mecha called Legions using a variety of weapons. While originally planned for international distribution, it was only released in Japan in May 1999. The game received mediocre critical reception, with many believing it was graphically underwhelming and filled with gameplay ideas that were more interesting in concept than in execution.

== Gameplay ==
Last Legion UX is an arena-based fighting game with shooting elements. Players control a mecha, called a Legion, in one-on-one battles, and attempt to deplete their opponent's health to win. Each model of Legion varies in its statistics, such as speed, firepower, and jumping ability. Legions fall into different classes, including humanoid Legions, which can equip shields; amphibious Legions, which are not slowed when in water; and floating Legions, which can fly through the air. Players are able to select their Legion's primary weapons and shield type before battle, such as laser swords or machine guns, each of which has different advantages and disadvantages. Each Legion also has a built in sub-weapon unique to that model, such as homing missiles or a grenade launcher.

During battles, players can jump, lock onto the opponent, perform close range melee strikes, fire projectile weapons, or guard against enemy attacks. An on-screen radar indicates the distance and direction of the opponent. Combat arenas vary in size, layout, and hazards, necessitating the use of strategy during battles, such as preparing an ambush in a maze or forcing an opponent into lava. Each Legion's power source, called a Powerstone, gradually charges with energy during battle, indicated by an on-screen meter; when full, the player can perform a Legion-specific super attack. Players can also use a short range grab to try and steal their opponent's Powerstone; while this is very difficult and leaves them vulnerable if they miss, it fully disables the opponent if successfully performed, triggering an automatic victory.

In the story mode, players choose from one of six Legions and defeat a series of opponents in an arcade-style progression. Six other Legions appear as opponents in story mode, including two Legions based on Bomberman that appear as secret opponents, all of which can be unlocked for use in the split-screen multiplayer mode along with their weapons and arenas. Up to two players can compete in battles, with the options to disable radars and split the screen horizontally or vertically between both players.

== Plot ==
In prehistoric times, a "divine star" was said to have fallen from the heavens and split the world into four continents, each based around one of the four elements. The divine star was then shattered by a giant, and its fragments scattered across the world. Over the following millennia, the world comes to be governed by the global organization Union IV, which develops peacekeeping mech suits called Legions powered by special elemental ore called Powerstones. Light Raid, a terrorist group bent on world domination, takes control of several Legions and wages a war against Union IV that goes on for many years.

In the year 2083 A.D., Legion pilot Colonel Reddi stages an attack on a Light Raid base, but receives word that Light Raid has hijacked a Union IV time portal facility, sending eight of their Legions back in time 4500 years to the beginning of civilization. With only enough power left for one more time jump, Union IV sends Reddi back in time with orders to destroy Light Raid's Legions and preserve the future. Upon arriving in 2416 B.C., Reddi finds that the presence of the future Legions is already affecting the timeline's stability, with ruins from later eras of history appearing and disappearing unexpectedly. Reddi begins tracking the Light Raid officers, taking down each of their Legions.

As he defeats each of Light Raid's officers, Reddi learns that one of the Legions is piloted by his former commanding officer, Colonel Colcott. Reddi confronts and defeats Colcott, who explains that his grandson was killed by collateral damage from a Legion battle, leading him to believe surrendering to Light Raid was the only way to end the war and prevent further civilian casualties. Apologizing for losing his way, Colcott reveals Light Raid's objective: The divine star in the creation myth was a meteorite which crashed onto the planet, the fragments of which became the Powerstones. Light Raid now intends to take the meteorite and harness its full power, cementing their control of the world.

Following Colcott's directions, Reddi finds and defeats the last Light Raid officer, but discovers he is too late and the meteorite has already been installed as the power source of Light Raid's battleship, the Rendezvous, which was brought back in time while using the other eight Legions as a distraction. Reddi travels underground to the planet's core, where the Rendezvous is hidden, and uses his Legion's Powerstone to siphon some of the meteorite's energy, powering his Legion up enough to destroy the ship's energy converter. In the destruction, the meteorite is split into fragments that are dispersed throughout the world as Powerstones, and Reddi realizes his Legion is the giant spoken of in the creation myth, having created a causal loop. In a post-credits scene, the last Light Raid officer's Legion suddenly reactivates.

== Development and release ==
Last Legion UX was first announced by Hudson Soft at E3 1997 under the name Legion X. Press outlets compared the game to Sega's Virtual On: Cyber Troopers (1995) and FromSoftware's Armored Core (1997). The developers considered implementing four-player battles, but were unable to do so due to technical limitations.

In October 1997, Nintendo Power reported that Mindscape would be publishing Last Legion UX outside Japan the following November. Hudson Soft later clarified that the news was premature and that they were still in negotiations with Mindscape, stating a North American release would not occur until Q2 or Q3 of 1998, after the Japanese version had launched. Hudson and Mindscape's negotiations later fell through, and the game underwent a lengthy delay, ultimately releasing only in Japan in May 1999. A set of promotional images were drawn by anime mecha designer Kunio Okawara.

== Reception ==
Contemporary reviews

Review scores
Publication	Score
N64 Magazine	60%
Video Games (DE)	3/5
Gamers' Republic	C−
Total N64	76%
X64 Magazine	55%

Last Legion UX received lukewarm reception from critics that imported copies from Japan. In their 1999 buyer's guide, Gamers' Republic felt the arenas' different terrain offered additional depth to battles, but the gameplay and graphics were "just okay". German publication Video Games concurred with this, noting the difficulty of keeping track of the action on screen. Martin Kitts of N64 Magazine praised the game for its uniqueness, but felt it was not as strong as Virtual On due to less nuanced controls and the lack of significant differences between each Legion. Mario Ricci of the French X64 Magazine thought it had novel ideas, particularly the hide-and-seek nature of its combat, but was severely let down by their execution and the overall presentation. Total N64 called the game "a serious contender for the worst game ever".
