= Yuko Emoto =

Japanese Olympic judoka

Personal information
- Born: 23 December 1972 (age 53)
- Occupation: Judoka

Sport
- Country: Japan
- Sport: Judo
- Weight class: ‍–‍61 kg

Achievements and titles
- Olympic Games: (gold) (1996)
- World Champ.: R64 (1995)
- Asian Champ.: (silver) (1994)
Medal record
Women's judo
Representing Japan
Olympic Games
Gold medal – first place	1996 Atlanta	‍–‍61 kg
Asian Games
Silver medal – second place	1994 Hiroshima	‍–‍61 kg
Asian Championships
Bronze medal – third place	1993 Macau	‍–‍61 kg
Bronze medal – third place	1995 New Delhi	‍–‍61 kg
East Asian Games
Silver medal – second place	1997 Busan	‍–‍61 kg

Profile at external databases
- IJF: 53323
- JudoInside.com: 2857
- Updated on 4 June 2023

Yuko Emoto (恵本 裕子, Emoto Yūko; born 23 December 1972 in Asahikawa, Hokkaido) is a Japanese judoka and Olympic champion. She won the gold medal in the half middleweight division at the 1996 Summer Olympics in Atlanta.

Emoto received a silver medal at the 1994 Asian Games.

Emoto is married to South Korean judoka Kim Hyuk.

In 2016, Emoto provided input to a manga series written by Makoto Kobayashi titled JJM: Joshi Judou-bu Monogatari.
