= Kazumi Fujita =

Japanese mecha designer (born 1964)

Kazumi Fujita (藤田 一巳, Fujita Kazumi) is a Japanese mecha designer, who has worked on several noted anime series and video games, notably Mobile Suit Zeta Gundam, The King of Braves GaoGaiGar Final, and Quo Vadis 2. He designed the Zeta Gundam, winning heated competition between Kunio Okawara, Mamoru Nagano and himself to design a finalized Zeta Gundam. Other designs that were rejected but used as mobile suits in the series include the Hyaku Shiki and the Psycho Gundam.
