= JJM: Joshi Judou-bu Monogatari =

Japanese manga series

- First tankōbon volume cover

JJM 女子柔道部物語
- Manga
- Written by: Yuko Emoto; Makoto Kobayashi
- Illustrated by: Makoto Kobayashi
- Published by: Kodansha
- Magazine: Evening (August 9, 2016 – February 28, 2023); Comic Days (April 30, 2023 – present)
- Original run: August 9, 2016 – present
- Volumes: 15
- icon

JJM: Joshi Judou-bu Monogatari (Japanese: JJM 女子柔道部物語; lit. 'Women's Judo Club Story') is a Japanese manga series created by Makoto Kobayashi and Olympic gold medalist judoka Yuko Emoto. It was serialized in Kodansha's seinen manga magazine Evening from August 2016 until February 2023, when the magazine ceased its publication, and the series moved to the Comic Days app in April of the same year.

== Publication ==
Written by Yuko Emoto, 1996 Atlanta Olympic Women's Judo-61 kg gold medalist, with Makoto Kobayashi in charge of dramatization, composition, and illustration, JJM: Joshi Judou-bu Monogatari started in Kodansha's Evening on August 9, 2016. It was originally conceptualized as a "what if" story depicting what would happen if the protagonist of Kobayashi's Judo-bu Monogatari was a woman. Evening ceased its publication on February 28, 2023, and the series moved to Kodansha's Comic Days app on April 30 of the same year. Kodansha has collected its chapters into individual tankōbon volumes. The first volume was released on December 22, 2016. As of August 23, 2023, 15 volumes have been released.

=== Volumes ===
No.	Release date	ISBN
1	December 22, 2016	978-4-06-354653-8
2	May 23, 2017	978-4-06-354671-2
3	November 21, 2017	978-4-06-510415-6
4	May 23, 2018	978-4-06-511394-3
5	November 22, 2018	978-4-06-513188-6
6	April 23, 2019	978-4-06-516074-9
7	October 23, 2019	978-4-06-517335-0
8	April 23, 2020	978-4-06-519088-3
9	August 20, 2020	978-4-06-520491-7
10	January 21, 2021	978-4-06-522112-9
11	July 21, 2021	978-4-06-524218-6
12	December 23, 2021	978-4-06-526344-0
13	May 23, 2022	978-4-06-527572-6
14	November 22, 2022	978-4-06-530201-9
15	August 23, 2023	978-4-06-532726-5

== Reception ==
By December 2020, the manga had over 1 million copies in circulation.
