= Dame Oyaji =

Japanese manga series

- The cover of Dame Oyaji volume 18

ダメおやじ
- Genre: Comedy
- Manga
- Written by: Mitsutoshi Furuya
- Published by: Akebono Shuppan; Shogakukan
- Magazine: Weekly Shōnen Sunday
- Original run: September 23, 1970 – July 28, 1982
- Volumes: 39 (21 from Akebono and 18 from Shogakukan)
- Anime television series
- Directed by: Fumio Ikeno; Hisashi Sakaguchi
- Studio: Knack Productions
- Original network: Tokyo Channel 12
- Original run: April 2, 1974 – October 9, 1974
- Episodes: 26

Dame Oyaji (ダメおやじ; lit. 'No Good Dad') is a Japanese manga series written and illustrated by Mitsutoshi Furuya. It was serialized by Shogakukan in Shōnen Sunday from September 23, 1970 (issue 43) to July 28, 1982 (issue 30). Dame Oyaji received the 1979 Shogakukan Manga Award for shōnen manga. The manga was compiled in thirty-nine tankōbon volumes, with Akebono Shuppan publishing the first 21 volumes under their Akebono Comics label and Shogakukan publishing the final 18 volumes under their Shōnen Sunday Comics label. All 39 volumes are available in eBook format via eBook Japan, the Shogakukan volumes (starting with volume 4) subtitled as the "My Way" arc.

== Plot ==
Dame Oyaji tells the story of Damesuke Amano, a hapless office worker who faces a tremendous amount of bullying on the job and especially at home, where he has (contrary to traditional Japanese notions of family) absolutely no power or say in the runnings of the household whatsoever. Amano lives with his wife, Onibaba, his beautiful teenaged daughter Yukiko, and his grade-schooler son Takobo. Onibaba is an imposing, violent heifer of a woman who regularly berates and even physically assaults her husband and who enjoys nothing more than making his life miserable; Yukiko and Takobo frequently join in physically and psychologically abusing their father. The original manga is said to have been quite shocking to early 1970s Japan, in which the father was often still traditionally regarded as the head of the household.

== TV adaptation ==
The series was adapted as a 26-episode anime television series broadcast on Tokyo Channel 12 (now TV Tokyo) between April 2 and October 9, 1974. Each half-hour episode comprised two shorter stories of approximately ten minutes in length. The anime toned down the original manga's level of violence considerably for a prime-time TV audience (although it is still quite violent) and featured episodes which focused more on Takobo and his everyday school and home life. The Takobo-focused episodes in particular are kinder and gentler than the series as a whole (for example, an episode in which Takobo fears losing his sister Yukiko, whom he idolizes, to marriage and, after trying various tactics to ruin her relationship with a potential suitor, runs away from home).

== Characters ==
=== Amano family ===
Damesuke Amano (雨野 ダメ助)

A salary worker, husband, and father who is treated like a punching bag both at work and at home.

Fuyuko Amamo (雨野 冬子)

The wife of Damesuke known as "Onibaba" (lit. "Demon Hag"). She is obese and masculine.

Yukiko Amano (雨野 雪子)

First child and only daughter.

Takobo Amano (雨野 タコ坊)

Second child and first son.

Ikataro Amano (雨野 イカ太郎)

Third child and second son.

=== Others ===
Rokubee (ロクベエ)

A stray dog and a friend of Damesuke.
