= Mitsutoshi Furuya =

Japanese manga artist (1936–2021)

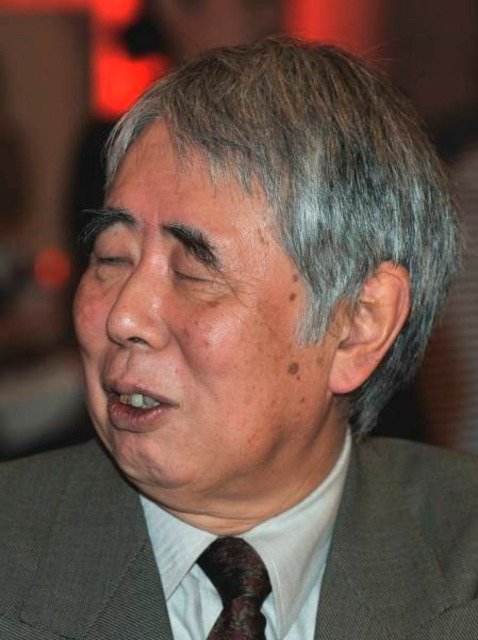
- Born: August 11, 1936; Manchukuo
- Died: December 8, 2021 (aged 85); Japan
- Occupation: Manga artist
- Known for: Dame Oyaji; Bar Lemon Heart

Mitsutoshi Furuya (古谷三敏, Furuya Mitsutoshi; August 11, 1936 – December 8, 2021) was a Japanese manga artist. He made his debut as a manga artist in 1955 with kashi-hon manga. He started as an assistant of Osamu Tezuka in 1958, but was primarily known for starting out as an assistant of Fujio Akatsuka five years later. He was best known for his series Dame Oyaji ("No-Good Dad", 1970–1982), which gained notoriety by giving a darkly humorous send-up of Japanese family life with a meek, pathetic father married to a cruel and savage wife. The series received the 1979 Shogakukan Manga Award for shōnen, was adapted into a movie in 1973 and as an anime television series in 1974.

Furuya died on December 8, 2021, at the age of 85.

== Selected works ==
- Tangerine Flowers Blooming on a Hill (みかんの花さく丘, 1955, Shimura Publishing)
- Netaro-kun (Manga Shonen)
- Hachamecha Lab (Manga Shonen)
- Pinky-chan (ピンキーちゃん, 1968–1969, Shojo Friend)
- Mako-chan (Shojo Friend)
- Princess Pudding-chan (プリンセスプリンちゃん, January to December 1969, Nakayoshi)- Also published in extra New Year and Spring special issues
- No-Good Father (ダメおやじ, 1970–1982, Weekly Shonen Sunday #43 to #30)
- Mandamu Oyako (マンダム親子, 1971–1972, Weekly Shonen King)
- Dotekabo-chan (ドテかぼちゃん, Weekly Shonen King)
- Gutara Mama (ぐうたらママ, April to July 1971, Separate Edition Shonen Magazine)- Prototype to better-known version of the series
- Dokudami-sensei (どくだみ先生, 1973–1974, Weekly Shonen Champion)
- Tecchan (手っちゃん, Weekly Shonen Champion)
- Chitaro of the Graveyard (墓場の血太郎, Weekly Shonen Champion)
- Tomurai-kun (とむらいクン)
- Gutara Mama (ぐうたらママ, 1975-, Mainichi Shimbun "Sunday Club")
- Mother-Loving Chidori (母恋い千鳥, 1975, Princess)
- Rakugo Artist Biography (寄席芸人伝, August 25, 1978 – November 25, 1989, Big Comic)
- Hachamecharabo (ハチャメチャラボ, 1979)
- Uwasa no Night Man (噂のナイトマン, 1980)
- Take it Easy Dabo-san (ゆっくりダボさん, 1982)
- Deduction Papa (減点パパ, January 13, 1983 – March 28, 1986, Weekly Post)
- BAR Lemon Heart (BARレモン・ハート,1985-, Manga Action)
- Our Jingorō (うちの甚五郎, 1986)
- Downtown Mogu (ダウンタウン・モグ, Weekly Josei)- co-authored with Yoshiyuki Ichihara
- What is the golf? (「ホワーッ!」といずゴルフ, 1990)
- Majidesu! Take-chan (マジです! タケちゃん, 1991)
- Granny's Kitchen Secrets's (おばあちゃんの台所秘伝, 1994)
- Manshon daitōryō (マンション大統領)
