= Reiko Terashima =

Japanese illustrator

Reiko Terashima (寺島令子, Terashima Reiko) is a Japanese yonkoma manga artist and illustrator born on 8 September 1958 in Kyoto, Japan. She graduated from Ritsumeikan University with a degree in psychology, and was a member of the manga club while there.

Terashima made her professional debut in 1979 with Children Play (チルドレンプレイ, Chirudoren Purei), published in the manga magazine Young Magazine. She has illustrated multiple cards for the Japanese edition of Magic: The Gathering.

Terashima is divorced. She has a close friendship with manga artist and illustrator Naoko Kanazawa, and her younger sister is manga artist Yoshiko Terakawa.

== Works ==
Works are listed alphabetically. Number of volumes and publisher are in parentheses, if known.

- Ai no Wakakusayama Monogatari (2 volumes, Takeshobo)
- Children Play (Kodansha)
- Kamaboko Nikki (Hakusensha)
- Kuriko-san Konnichi wa (Takeshobo)
- Kuriko no Himekuri Calendar (Takeshobo)
- Kyō no Nanyōbi (ASCII)
- Moko Moko no Hitotsu (Asahi Sonorama)
- Power of Mama (1 volume, Studio Ship)
- Sokotsu no Hibi (Kawade Shobō Shinsha)
- Tadasuke Nikki (Takeshobo)
- Titanic Mama (Studio Ship)
- Tsuiraku Nisshi (2 volumes, ASCII)
- Udonland (5 volumes + Final (完結編, Kanketsuhen), Channel Zero)
