= List of Mobile Suit Gundam episodes =

Mobile Suit Gundam (機動戦士ガンダム, Kidō Senshi Gandamu) is an anime television series created and directed by Yoshiyuki Tomino, and produced by Nagoya Broadcasting Network, Sotsu Agency, and Sunrise. The English adaptation of the anime is licensed by Bandai Entertainment.

The series premiered in Japan on Nagoya Broadcasting Network between April 7, 1979, and January 26, 1980, spanning 43 episodes. The English adaptation premiered in the United States on Cartoon Network's Toonami programing block between July 23, 2001, and September 12, 2001. Episode 38 was skipped due to the September 11 attacks, and the show was removed after Episode 39. The final episode did premiere on Toonami's "New Year's Evil" special presentation. Animax Asia also broadcast the English adaptation across Southeast Asia and South Asia. The 15th episode, "Cucuruz Doan's Island" never aired in English.

Two pieces of theme music by Koh Ikeda are used for the episodes, one opening theme and one closing theme. The opening theme is "Fly! Gundam" (Tobe! Gundam), and the closing theme is "Forever Amuro" (Eien ni Amuro).

== Episode list ==
| No. overall | No. Eng | Title | Directed by | Written by | Original release date | English air date |
|---|---|---|---|---|---|---|
| 1 | 1 | "Gundam Rising"; Transliteration: "Gandamu Daichi ni Tatsu!!" (Japanese: ガンダム大地に立つ!! (Note: Episode 1: "Gundam Rises Upon the Land!!")) | Shinya Sadamitsu; Yoshiyuki Tomino | Hiroyuki Hoshiyama | April 7, 1979 | July 23, 2001 |
9 months after the start of the One Year War, the Earth Federation detects a group of Zakus from the Principality of Zeon, led by Char Aznable, preparing to launch a surprise attack on the space colony Side 7, initiating an evacuation order to White Base. Meanwhile, one of the colony's residents, a teenage science enthusiast named Amuro Ray and his friend Frau Bow, plan on leaving the colony, but are eventually caught in a crossfire in an emergency shelter. Putting his life on the line, Amuro goes out to find his father, who plans to utilize his latest creations, the mobile suits, to overpower the Zeon troops and end the war for good. However, upon witnessing an explosion caused by a hijacked federation missile car, he inadvertently stumbles across a manual containing combat intel on one of the mobile suits: The Gundam. With the situation becoming bleaker than ever, along with Frau Bow's mother being killed while attempting to flee, Amuro is forced to pilot the Gundam as his last resort. Using the manual's instructions, he manages to defeat the Zakus easily, despite several struggles.
| 2 | 2 | "Destroy Gundam!"; Transliteration: "Gandamu Hakai Meirei" (Japanese: ガンダム破壊命令 (Note: Episode 2: "The Order to Destroy Gundam")) | Ryoji Fujihara; Yoshiyuki Tomino | Kenichi Matsuzaki | April 14, 1979 | July 24, 2001 |
In order to evacuate Side Seven, Amuro Ray and the Gundam duel Char Aznable and his custom Zaku in space.
| 3 | 3 | "Vote to Attack"; Transliteration: "Teki no Hokyūkan o Tatake!" (Japanese: 敵の補給艦を叩け! (Note: Episode 3: "Strike the Enemy Supply Ship!")) | Hideyoshi Ojika; Yoshiyuki Tomino | Yoshihisa Araki | April 21, 1979 | July 25, 2001 |
In order to improve their chances of eluding Char Aznable's pursuit of White Base, the crew has to vote whether or not to attack a Zeon supply ship.
| 4 | 4 | "Escape From Luna II"; Transliteration: "Runa Tsū Dasshutsu Sakusen" (Japanese: ルナツー脱出作戦 (Note: Episode 4: "The Luna II Escape Operation")) | Shinya Sadamitsu | Masaru Yamamoto | April 28, 1979 | July 26, 2001 |
After arriving at a Federation asteroid military base, the White Base is confiscated and its crew are arrested for violating military protocol by allowing civilians to use top secret government property.
| 5 | 5 | "Re-Entry to Earth"; Transliteration: "Taikiken Totsunyū" (Japanese: 大気圏突入 (Note: Episode 5: "Breaking Through the Atmosphere")) | Ryoji Fujihara; Yoshiyuki Tomino | Hiroyuki Hoshiyama | May 5, 1979 | July 27, 2001 |
Bright Noa is instructed to take the White Base to a military base on Earth, but first they have to take on Char Aznable's forces near the atmospheric entry point.
| 6 | 6 | "Garma Strikes"; Transliteration: "Garuma Shutsugeki Su" (Japanese: ガルマ出撃す) | Hideyoshi Ojika | Masaru Yamamoto | May 12, 1979 | July 30, 2001 |
White Base arrives on Zeon territory due to Char Aznable's strategy; Garma Zabi, eager to impress his sister Kycilia and his friend Char, decides to attack White Base.
| 7 | 7 | "The Core Fighter's Escape"; Transliteration: "Koa Faitā Dasshutsu Seyo" (Japanese: コアファイター脱出せよ (Note: Episode 7: "Core Fighter, Escape")) | Ryoji Fujihara; Kazuo Yamazaki | Yoshihisa Araki | May 18, 1979 | July 31, 2001 |
Amuro attempts to contact Federation forces by flying back into space with the Core Fighter.
| 8 | 8 | "Winds of War"; Transliteration: "Senjō wa Kōya" (Japanese: 戦場は荒野 (Note: Episode 8: "The Battlefield is a Wasteland")) | Shinya Sadamitsu | Kenichi Matsuzaki | May 26, 1979 | August 1, 2001 |
A cease fire is declared between Zeon and Federation forces when the refugees aboard White Base decide to jump ship.
| 9 | 9 | "Fly, Gundam!"; Transliteration: "Tobe! Gandamu" (Japanese: 翔べ!ガンダム (Note: Episode 9: "Fly! Gundam")) | Hideyoshi Ojika; Yoshiyuki Tomino | Hiroyuki Hoshiyama | June 2, 1979 | August 2, 2001 |
Amuro feels unwilling to pilot the Gundam anymore, while Garma Zabi is planning to personally lead an attack on White Base.
| 10 | 10 | "Garma's Fate"; Transliteration: "Garuma Chiru" (Japanese: ガルマ散る (Note: Episode 10: "Garma Falls")) | Ryoji Fujihara | Masaru Yamamoto | June 9, 1979 | August 3, 2001 |
Garma's task force consisting of Gaws pursue White Base to the now ruined city of New York.
| 11 | 11 | "Icelina- Love's Remains"; Transliteration: "Iserina, Koi no Ato" (Japanese: イセリナ,恋のあと) | Shinya Sadamitsu | Yoshihisa Araki | June 16, 1979 | August 6, 2001 |
Icelina Esconbach asks a Zeon officer to lead a special mission to destroy White Base, in retaliation for the death of her boyfriend Garma.
| 12 | 12 | "The Threat of Zeon"; Transliteration: "Jion no Kyōi" (Japanese: ジオンの脅威) | Yuichi Yokoyama; Yoshiyuki Tomino | Kenichi Matsuzaki | June 23, 1979 | August 7, 2001 |
Gihren Zabi uses the death of his brother Garma as a rallying point for the Zeon cause while a new task force led by Ramba Ral and Gouf mobile suit pursue White Base.
| 13 | 13 | "Coming Home"; Transliteration: "Saikai, Haha yo" (Japanese: 再会,母よ (Note: Episode 13: "We Meet Again, Mother")) | Ryoji Fujihara | Hiroyuki Hoshiyama | June 30, 1979 | August 8, 2001 |
Amuro Ray is reunited with his mother Kamaria when the crew of White Base coincidentally decides to rest near the place where he was born.
| 14 | 14 | "Time, Be Still"; Transliteration: "Jikan yo, Tomare" (Japanese: 時間よ,とまれ) | Shinya Sadamitsu; Yoshiyuki Tomino | Yoshiyuki Tomino | July 6, 1979 | August 9, 2001 |
Time is running out for Amuro when a small squadron of Zeon soldiers in hovering bikes plant time bombs all over the Gundam's frame.
| 15 | — | "Cucuruz Doan's Island"; Transliteration: "Kukurusu Doan no Shima" (Japanese: ククルス·ドアンの島) | Yoshiyuki Tomino; Shinya Sadamitsu | Yoshihisa Araki | July 14, 1979 | Unaired |
When a distress signal is detected on a small island in the Pacific, Amuro is dispatched with the Core Fighter to investigate the source. Note: This episode was neither broadcast nor made available on DVD in North America, per series creator and director Yoshiyuki Tomino's request. The episode was later adapted into the film Mobile Suit Gundam: Cucuruz Doan's Island (Japanese: 機動戦士ガンダム ククルス·ドアンの島, Hepburn: Kidō Senshi Gandamu Kukurusu Doan no Shima). The film was released in Japan on June 3, 2022.
| 16 | 15 | "Sayla's Agony"; Transliteration: "Seira Shutsugeki" (Japanese: セイラ出撃 (Note: Episode 16: "Sayla Sorties")) | Yoshiyuki Tomino | Masaru Yamamoto | July 21, 1979 | August 10, 2001 |
When the crew runs out of salt, Sayla Mass sorties with the Gundam without authorization in the hopes of finding out whether Char Aznable is her long lost brother. They find salt in the end.
| 17 | 16 | "Amuro Deserts"; Transliteration: "Amuro Dassō" (Japanese: アムロ脱走) | Ryoji Fujihara; Yoshiyuki Tomino | Kenichi Matsuzaki | July 28, 1979 | August 13, 2001 |
Bright Noa decides to relieve Amuro as pilot of the Gundam after a tactical blunder made by the latter on the field of battle nearly results in defeat.
| 18 | 17 | "Zeon's Secret Mine"; Transliteration: "Shakunetsu no Azzamu Rīdā" (Japanese: 灼熱のアッザム·リーダー (Note: Episode 18: "The Red-Hot Adzam Leader")) | Shinya Sadamitsu | Kenichi Matsuzaki | August 4, 1979 | August 14, 2001 |
The crew of White Base searches for the Amuro and the Gundam; Amuro hopes to end the war by attacking a mine believed to be the main source of iron ore for the Zeon war industry.
| 19 | 18 | "Ramba Ral's Attack"; Transliteration: "Ranba Raru Tokkō!" (Japanese: ランバ·ラル特攻! (Note: Episode 19: "Ramba Ral's Suicide Attack!")) | Susumu Gyoda; Yoshiyuki Tomino | Hiroyuki Hoshiyama | August 11, 1979 | August 15, 2001 |
A mobile suit squadron led by Ramba Ral and his Gouf attack White Base while Amuro and the Gundam return just in time to help.
| 20 | 19 | "Hand-to-Hand Combat"; Transliteration: "Shitō! Howaito Bēsu" (Japanese: 死闘!ホワイト·ベース (Note: Episode 20: "Mortal Combat! White Base")) | Ryoji Fujihara; Yoshiyuki Tomino | Masaru Yamamoto | August 18, 1979 | August 16, 2001 |
An all-out battle breaks out inside White Base as Ramba Ral and his soldiers infiltrate the ship in the hopes of capturing or destroying it.
| 21 | 20 | "Sorrow and Hatred"; Transliteration: "Gekitō wa Nikushimi Fukaku" (Japanese: 激闘は憎しみ深く (Note: Episode 21: "The Struggle Runs Deep with Hatred")) | Susumu Gyoda; Yoshiyuki Tomino | Yoshihisa Araki | August 25, 1979 | August 17, 2001 |
Crowley Hamon spearheads one last suicidal attack on White Base with what remains of the troops once led by Ramba Ral.
| 22 | 21 | "The Trap of M'Quve"; Transliteration: "Ma Kube Hōimō o Yabure!" (Japanese: マ·クベ包囲網を破れ! (Note: Episode 22: "Break Through M'Quve's Entanglement!")) | Shinya Sadamitsu | Kenichi Matsuzaki | September 1, 1979 | August 20, 2001 |
As Operation Odessa nears, Colonel M'Quve lures the White Base into a trap while Bright Noa is unable to captain the ship.
| 23 | 22 | "Matilda's Rescue"; Transliteration: "Machiruda Kyūshutsu Sakusen" (Japanese: マチルダ救出作戦 (Note: Episode 23: "The Operation to Rescue Matilda")) | Ryoji Fujihara | Hiroyuki Hoshiyama | September 8, 1979 | August 21, 2001 |
Lieutenant Matilda's supply corps is attacked by Zeon Goufs when they attempt to send upgrade modules for the Gundam and supply and repair parts for White Base.
| 24 | 23 | "Black Tri-Star"; Transliteration: "Hakugeki! Toripuru Domu" (Japanese: 迫撃!トリプル·ドム (Note: Episode 24: "A Close Attack! The Triple Doms")) | Osamu Sekita; Yoshiyuki Tomino | Masaru Yamamoto | September 15, 1979 | August 22, 2001 |
A mole inside the Federation tips off Zeon HQ, who then send the Black Tri-Stars special team ordered to destroy the White Base and her prototype mobile suits.
| 25 | 24 | "The Battle of Odessa"; Transliteration: "Odessa no Gekisen" (Japanese: オデッサの激戦) | Shinya Sadamitsu | Yoshihisa Araki | September 22, 1979 | August 23, 2001 |
Amuro discovers the Zeon mole, stops a nuclear bomb, and faces off the remaining two members of the Black Tri-Stars as the battle at Odessa continues.
| 26 | 25 | "Char Returns"; Transliteration: "Fukkatsu no Shaa" (Japanese: 復活のシャア) | Ryoji Fujihara; Yoshiyuki Tomino | Kenichi Matsuzaki | September 29, 1979 | August 24, 2001 |
Under the command of Char Aznable, new Zeon amphibious mobile suits attack White Base, docked in a Federation base at Belfast.
| 27 | 26 | "A Spy on Board"; Transliteration: "Onna Supai Sennyū!" (Japanese: 女スパイ潜入! (Note: Episode 27: "A Lady Spy Sneaks In!")) | Hiroshi Hisano; Yoshiyuki Tomino | Hiroyuki Hoshiyama | October 6, 1979 | August 27, 2001 |
Kai Shiden develops a friendship with Miharu Ratokie, a local girl, while Char prepares a second amphibious attack on the Federation at Belfast.
| 28 | 27 | "Across the Atlantic Ocean"; Transliteration: "Taiseiyō, Chi ni Somete" (Japanese: 大西洋,血に染めて (Note: Episode 28: "The Atlantic Ocean, Stained with Blood")) | Osamu Sekita; Yoshiyuki Tomino | Masaru Yamamoto | October 13, 1979 | August 28, 2001 |
Thanks to intelligence acquired from Miharu, Flanagan Boone and his Mad Angler squadron attack the White Base en route to Jaburo headquarters in South America.
| 29 | 28 | "Tragedy in Jaburo"; Transliteration: "Jaburō ni Chiru!" (Japanese: ジャブローに散る! (Note: Episode 29: "A Downfall in Jaburo!")) | Shinya Sadamitsu; Yoshiyuki Tomino | Yoshihisa Araki | October 20, 1979 | August 29, 2001 |
The White Base finally reaches Jaburo general headquarters; Zeon then launches a massive invasion on the base led by Char and his custom MSM-07 Z'Gok.
| 30 | 29 | "A Wish of War Orphans"; Transliteration: "Chiisana Bōeisen" (Japanese: 小さな防衛線 (Note: Episode 30: "A Tiny Defense Line")) | Ryoji Fujihara | Masaru Yamamoto | October 27, 1979 | August 30, 2001 |
Char infiltrates Jaburo with a squadron of MSM-04 Acguy mobile suits and plant time bombs on the Federation's new mass-produced GMs, but not before being discovered by Katz, Kikka, and Letz.
| 31 | 30 | "A Decoy in Space"; Transliteration: "Zanjibaru, Tsuigeki!" (Japanese: ザンジバル,追撃! (Note: Episode 31: "The Zanzibar in Pursuit!")) | Hiroshi Hisano; Yoshiyuki Tomino | Hiroyuki Hoshiyama | November 3, 1979 | August 31, 2001 |
White Base and the Gundam confront the cruiser Zanzibar, led by Char, and a mobile armor called MA-05 Bigro in low earth orbit.
| 32 | 31 | "Breakthrough"; Transliteration: "Kyōkō Toppa Sakusen" (Japanese: 強行突破作戦 (Note: Episode 32: "The Forceful Breakthrough Operation")) | Osamu Sekita; Yoshiyuki Tomino | Kenichi Matsuzaki | November 10, 1979 | September 3, 2001 |
A task force of Musai cruisers and Rick Doms led by Dren attempt to destroy the White Base as it heads towards the neutral colony of Side Six.
| 33 | 32 | "Farewell in Side Six"; Transliteration: "Konsukon Kyōshū" (Japanese: コンスコン強襲 (Note: Episode 33: "Conscon's Assault")) | Shinya Sadamitsu; Yoshiyuki Tomino | Masaru Yamamoto | November 17, 1979 | September 4, 2001 |
In need of repairs, the White Base is attacked outside the neutral Side Six by a fleet led by Captain Conscon.
| 34 | 33 | "A Fateful Encounter"; Transliteration: "Shukumei no Deai" (Japanese: 宿命の出会い) | Ryoji Fujihara | Hiroyuki Hoshiyama | November 24, 1979 | September 5, 2001 |
Inside Side Six, Amuro meets a beautiful girl named Lalah Sune and tensions run high when a Zanzibar ship led by Char Aznable docks next to the White Base.
| 35 | 34 | "The Glory of Solomon"; Transliteration: "Soromon Kōryakusen" (Japanese: ソロモン攻略戦 (Note: Episode 35: "The Fight to Capture Solomon")) | Hiroshi Hisano | Kenichi Matsuzaki | December 1, 1979 | September 6, 2001 |
A massive Federation combined space fleet attacks the Principality of Zeon's Fortress of Solomon, commanded by Dozle Zabi.
| 36 | 35 | "Big-Zam's Last Stand"; Transliteration: "Kyōfu! Kidō Bigu Zamu" (Japanese: 恐怖!機動ビグ·ザム (Note: Episode 36: "Terror! The Big Zam Mobilizes")) | Osamu Sekita; Yoshiyuki Tomino | Kenichi Matsuzaki | December 8, 1979 | September 7, 2001 |
As the battle continues, a hulking mobile armor piloted by Dozle Zabi inflicts heavy losses on the Federation; Amuro and Sleggar come up with a plan to stop its onslaught.
| 37 | 36 | "The Duel in Texas"; Transliteration: "Tekisasu no Kōbō" (Japanese: テキサスの攻防) | Shinya Sadamitsu; Yoshiyuki Tomino | Masaru Yamamoto | December 15, 1979 | September 10, 2001 |
Amuro Ray's Gundam duels Colonel M'Quve's YMS-15 Gyan on the abandoned and dilapidated colony of Texas while Char and Lalah watch from afar.
| 38 | 37 | "Char and Sayla"; Transliteration: "Saikai, Shaa to Seira" (Japanese: 再会、シャアとセイラ (Note: Episode 38: "Char and Sayla, Reunited")) | Ryoji Fujihara | Kenichi Matsuzaki | December 22, 1979 | April 9, 2002 |
Char Aznable's Gelgoog takes over M'Quve on engaging the Gundam while the White Base enters the Texas colony and sends Sayla Mass and Job John to search for Amuro.
| 39 | 38 | "The Newtype: Challia Bull"; Transliteration: "Nyū Taipu, Sharia Buru" (Japanese: ニュータイプ、シャリア·ブル) | Osamu Sekita; Yoshiyuki Tomino | Masaru Yamamoto | December 29, 1979 | September 12, 2001 |
Gihren Zabi sends Char a Newtype to pilot the new Braw Bro; Amuro's own Newtype abilities are growing as he senses the presence of Lalah.
| 40 | 39 | "Lalah's Dilemma"; Transliteration: "Erumesu no Rarā" (Japanese: エルメスのララ (Note: Episode 40: "Lalah in the Elmeth")) | Osamu Sekita; Yoshiyuki Tomino | Yoshihisa Araki | January 5, 1980 | June 2, 2002 |
The Gundam is upgraded and Lalah's Elmeth enters combat for the first time; Amuro and Lalah cross paths again but this time as enemies.
| 41 | 40 | "A Cosmic Glow"; Transliteration: "Hikaru Uchū" (Japanese: 光る宇宙 (Note: Episode 41: "The Glowing Cosmos")) | Shinya Sadamitsu | Kenichi Matsuzaki | January 12, 1980 | June 2, 2002 |
Amuro and Lalah fight each other for the second time and communicate telepathically, while Gihren Zabi inspects the construction of the Solar Ray.
| 42 | 41 | "Space Fortress: A Baoa Qu"; Transliteration: "Uchū Yōsai A Baoa Kū" (Japanese: 宇宙要塞ア·バオア·クー) | Ryoji Fujihara; Yoshiyuki Tomino | Hiroyuki Hoshiyama | January 19, 1980 | June 2, 2002 |
Federation forces, including White Base, proceed to invade the Fortress of A Baoa Qu despite losing half of their combined fleet due to Zeon's Solar Ray; Amuro and Char—now piloting the Zeong—engage in battle again.
| 43 | 42 | "Escape"; Transliteration: "Dasshutsu" (Japanese: 脱出) | Osamu Sekita; Yoshiyuki Tomino | Hiroyuki Hoshiyama | January 26, 1980 | December 31, 2001 |
The Battle of A Baoa Qu reaches a critical point; White Base is deep within enemy territory, Amuro and Char's relentless duel continues, and Kycilia Zabi struggles in command.
