= Kazuhisa Kondo =

Japanese mecha designer (born 1959)

Kazuhisa Kondo (近藤和久, Kondo Kazuhisa; born April 2, 1959) is a Japanese mecha designer. He is known for working on the Gundam series.

== Credited series/works ==
=== Manga ===
- Chi o nonda apāto - 1984
- MS Senki Kidō Senshi Gundam 0079 Gaiden (Record of MS Wars) - 1984
- Kidō Senshi Z Gundam Gaiden (Z Gundam Side Story) - 1986
- Shin MS senki kidō senshi Gundam 0079 tanpenshū (Record of MS Wars II) - 1988
- Mobile Suit Vor!! - (Mobile Suit Vor!!) 1989
- Operation Buran (Operation Buran) - 1990
- Kidō senshi Gundam 0079 (Gundam 0079) - 1992-1995
- Kidō senshi Z Gundam (Z Gundam) - 1994
- Kidō senshi Gundam Zion no saikō (The Revival of Zeon) - 1996
- Kidō senshi Gundam Operation: Troy - 2006-2007
- Kidō senshi Gundam Shin Zeon no Saikou - 2010-2011
- Kidō senshi Gundam the MSV: The Mobile Suit Variations (Gundam 0079) - 2011-2014
- Kidō Senshi Gundam - Na mo Naki Senjou (Gundam 0079) - 2013-2014

=== Anime ===
- Mobile Suit Zeta Gundam
- Mobile Suit Gundam 0080: War in the Pocket
