= Dai-Tōkyō Binbō Seikatsu Manual =

Japanese manga series

- Cover of Dai-Tokyo Binbo Seikatsu Manual Vol. 3

大東京ビンボー生活マニュアル (Dai-Tōkyō Binbō Seikatsu Manyuaru)
- Manga
- Written by: Tsukasa Maekawa
- Published by: Kodansha
- Magazine: Weekly Morning
- Original run: 1986 – 1989
- Volumes: 5

Dai-Tōkyō Binbō Seikatsu Manual (Japanese: 大東京ビンボー生活マニュアル, Hepburn: Dai-Tōkyō Binbō Seikatsu Manyuaru) is a Japanese manga by Tsukasa Maekawa, originally published in the mid-1980s. The title roughly translates to "Greater Tokyo Poverty Living Manual", and is an apt description of the comic's premise.

== The story ==
The protagonist of Dai-Tokyo is Kōsuke, a college graduate who decides to live a simple 'no frills' lifestyle on little money in the Greater Tokyo Area. He has no full-time employment, and instead works only part-time jobs and does chores around the neighborhood in exchange for goods and services. He spends his free time enjoying life's simple pleasures, reading, conversing with neighbors, and going out with his girlfriend. In this way Kōsuke breaks many traditions of Japanese society, such as not taking on the role of salaryman and striving for personal economic betterment. Despite this, Kōsuke is well respected and liked by his neighbors and friends, even if they do find him and his philosophy a bit peculiar. In the end, Kōsuke's philosophy of mixing 'poor' living with intellect and traditional Japanese values affirms much of Japanese culture and its traditions, rather than tears them down.

== Use of the word binbō ==
In the title of, and throughout the manga, Maekawa chose to spell the Japanese word for poverty, binbō, using katakana instead of the usual kanji for two reasons. First, using katakana instead of a more traditional spelling gives a word a stronger emphasis (similar to italicizing or bolding a word in English). Second, using katakana can indicate that a word's usage does not fall into the traditional meaning or sense of the word. The katakana lends emphasis since the manga revolves around Kōsuke's 'poor lifestyle', and it differentiates his lifestyle (which he explicitly chose for himself) from the usual definition of poverty. So despite there being a common and easily recognizable kanji compound for binbō (貧乏), a katakana spelling is used instead (ビンボー).

== 'Binbō' as a philosophy ==
The very first page of the manga declares its philosophy: an army of characters from the manga holding up miniature Japanese flags yelling, "Extravagance is the enemy!" (ゼイタクは敵だ!! Zeitaku wa teki da!!). Two banners are held up in the background exclaiming, "Poverty is fashion" (ビンボーはファションだ Binbou wa fashon da) and, "Poverty is an ideology, it is life itself" (ビンボーは思想だ 人生そのものだ Binbou wa shisou da / Jinsei sono mono da).

Maekawa's use of the Japanese flag is to show that the image most associated with Japan—that of the hardworking, self-sacrificing, upwardly mobile Japanese salaryman—is not all there is to life in Japan. It is at the same time a condemnation of the excessive luxury and rampant consumption of much of the Japanese dominant society, and a championing of those left out of mainstream Japanese society. (Indeed, the first chapter's title announces, "I'm an ally of the poor man" (私、ビンボー人の味方です Watashi, binbou-jin no mikata desu).) His message that you don't have to have a lot of money and material goods to make yourself happy is repeated again and again throughout the story.

The manga's binbō philosophy can be seen as similar to the voluntary simplicity movement, despite Maekawa's somewhat different reasons for rejection of a consumerist lifestyle.

== Dai-Tokyo as a living guide ==
Although Dai-Tokyo's main concern may be entertainment and political statement, it also serves as a how-to guide for pulling off a successful and happy poor lifestyle. The entire second page of the manga is devoted to examples of 'cheap living', with several practical instances given, including ways to save money on food, drink, shoes, clothing accessories, and others. More examples are sprinkled throughout the rest of the manga as story elements. Outside of specific money-saving examples, many free or cheap activities, including games, cultural events, festivals, and so on are portrayed throughout the manga.

Despite the manga's Japan-only availability, at least one writer has recommended Dai-Tokyo to people traveling to Japan as a good guide on how to enjoy their stay without spending too much.

== Publication ==
There have been no official English translations of the manga as a whole (and thus no official English title), but Mangajin has translated several chapters in their magazine and small portions of it (a panel at a time) for use in various books as a teaching aid for those learning Japanese.

The original Japanese manga first appeared in the weekly manga Morning (モーニング) from March 1986 to October 1989. A total of 167 episodes appeared during this time, and two new episodes were written for the 2005 reprint. It has been collected in five volumes (tankōbon) twice, and again most recently as a two volume set:

- Wide KC Morning (ワイドKCモーニング)
  - Dai-Tokyo Binbo Seikatsu Manual Vol. 1 (1987) ISBN 4-06-176527-2
  - Dai-Tokyo Binbo Seikatsu Manual Vol. 2 (1988) ISBN 4-06-176533-7
  - Dai-Tokyo Binbo Seikatsu Manual Vol. 3 (1988) ISBN 4-06-176539-6
  - Dai-Tokyo Binbo Seikatsu Manual Vol. 4 (1989) ISBN 4-06-176554-X
  - Dai-Tokyo Binbo Seikatsu Manual Vol. 5 (1989) ISBN 4-06-176567-1
- Kodansha Manga Library (講談社まんが文庫 Kōdansha Manga Bunko)
  - Dai-Tokyo Binbo Seikatsu Manual Vol. 1 (1995) ISBN 4-06-260042-0
  - Dai-Tokyo Binbo Seikatsu Manual Vol. 2 (1995) ISBN 4-06-260043-9
  - Dai-Tokyo Binbo Seikatsu Manual Vol. 3 (1995) ISBN 4-06-260044-7
  - Dai-Tokyo Binbo Seikatsu Manual Vol. 4 (1995) ISBN 4-06-260053-6
  - Dai-Tokyo Binbo Seikatsu Manual Vol. 5 (1995) ISBN 4-06-260054-4
- Kodansha
  - Dai-Tokyo Binbou Seikatsu Manual Vol. 1 (2005) ISBN 4-06-372104-3
  - Dai-Tokyo Binbou Seikatsu Manual Vol. 2 (2005) ISBN 4-06-372105-1
