= Risu Akizuki =

Japanese manga artist

Risu Akizuki 秋月りす
- Born: September 16, 1957 (age 69); Fukuoka Prefecture, Japan
- Known for: Manga
- Notable work: OL Shinkaron
- Movement: Yonkoma
- Awards: Tezuka Osamu Cultural Prize

Risu Akizuki (秋月 りす, Akizuki Risu; born September 16, 1957, in Fukuoka Prefecture, Japan) is the pen name of a Japanese four-panel manga artist. She made her professional manga debut with Okusama Shinkaron in 1988. Her most famous work is OL Shinkaron. She won the 8th Tezuka Osamu Cultural Prize in 2004.
