= Zaku =

Fictional manned robot in the anime series Mobile Suit Gundam

Zaku II
- Mobile Suit Gundam; Mobile Suit Gundam 08th MS Team; Mobile Suit Gundam 0083 Stardust Memory; Mobile Suit Gundam 0080: War in the Pocket character
- First appearance: Mobile Suit Gundam ep. #01, "Gundam Rising"
- Class: Mass Production General-Purpose Mobile Suit
- Designation: MS-06 Zaku II
- Faction: Principality of Zeon; Earth Federation (Captured)

In-universe information
- Armament: 120mm Zaku Machine gun; 280mm Zaku Bazooka; Heat hawk (stored on hip armor when not in use); 2 x 3-tube Missile Launcher (Mounted on legs); Cracker Grenade (optional)

The Zaku (ザク, Zaku) is a fictional line of "Mobile Suits" or mecha (human-piloted giant robots) from Mobile Suit Gundam, part of the fictional universe of the Universal Century, where they are the Principality of Zeon's most commonly fielded Mobile Suits. The most widely known model is the MS-06 Zaku II series. It is redesigned by Kunio Okawara based upon the earlier draft by the series director Yoshiyuki Tomino, in which only the name was kept. The Zaku II has seen various redesigns and variants for hundreds of pieces of merchandise, and the Japanese post office has two stamps with Zaku IIs on them. The Zaku's aesthetic can be seen in more symbolic homages in the Gundam mythos, such as the GINN and ZAKU Warrior from Mobile Suit Gundam SEED, the Busshi from Mobile Fighter G Gundam, and the Jenice from After War Gundam X.

After the original show's run, Okawara and other designers created several variants of the Zaku. Many of these modified configurations never appeared in animation, but they are official Mobile Suit variations, appearing instead in plastic model form and various Gundam video games. The MS-06 Zaku II is still a major force in Gundam, with almost every new side story in the Universal Century adding a new variant to the basic frame.

== Concept and development ==
The original concept of the Zaku was a disposable underling, with its name derived from the sound of a huge man (or many soldiers) marching and the Japanese term zako (雑魚, lit. 'inferior fish') (referring to mediocre-quality fish meat considered unsuitable for fine dining, also signifying expendable grunts).

The Zaku later became better known as a common military machine. While in previous manga and anime giant robots tended to be the tools of protagonists or villains (often in a monster of the week format), the Zaku was portrayed as another weapon, such as a tank or fighter plane, assigned to pilots.

The Zaku is the first mobile suit to feature its parts (a damaged head) and is shown in three of the four box arts in the 1/35 U.C. Hard Graph line of plastic models made by Bandai, which resemble actual battlefields. This militaristic development started with the release of Gundam series models in 1980, when military modellers at that time took a liking to placing 1/144 scale Zaku model when placed next to World War I and World War II 1/144 models, because they liked the visual appeal, and modellers started to build them like AFVs.

The popularity of the first batch of models spawned the "Mobile Suit Variations," where the mecha designer Kunio Okawara started designing variant mobile suits that could perform different tasks or adapt to different combat zones (for example, a Zaku specialized for underwater operations).

The MS-06 Zaku II unit then became the unit with most variants (22 alone in the first MSV all having its model compared to titular machine RX-78-2 Gundam's 3 variants). The Zaku also had redesigns and variants created by other mecha designers, like Hajime Katoki, who designed the MS-06F2 Zaku II Type F2 for Mobile Suit Gundam 0083: Stardust Memory and redesigned the Zaku II Ground Type and Char's Commander type Zaku for the MG (Master Grade) number 97 and 98 Zaku Ver. 2.0, Yutaka Izubuchi.

The design of the Zaku II influenced the later designs of the RMS-106 Hizack in Mobile Suit Zeta Gundam and AMX-011 Zaku III in Mobile Suit Gundam ZZ. The RMS-116H Hobby Hizack, not a military-use but a personal entertainment suit, which appeared in Mobile Suit Gundam: Char's Counterattack was also influenced by the Zaku. Its descendants continue to appear even in manga, like the OMS-06RF RF Zaku used by the Mars Zeon faction in Mobile Suit Gundam F90.

== Role in plot ==
The Zaku II is the most common Zeon mobile suit at the show's beginning. Although a threat to unskilled characters, the Zaku is ultimately cannon fodder that comes in plentiful numbers for the Gundam.

In the Gundam timeline, the Zaku appears as one of the series' first units created for battle. At the start of the One-Year War, the Zaku II was the mainstay of Zeon's military but quickly became inferior to newer and more powerful mobile suits as the war progressed. By the later stages of the war, the Zaku II is antiquated. Because the Zaku II is the basic military unit of the Zeon forces and it is a mass-production mobile suit, many units are left by the war's end. These suits survive only to be destroyed en-masse to show the power of the newer models.

By the time of Gundam Unicorn, over fifteen years after the One Year War, Zaku II's are shown as museum pieces. Upon seeing a display model of an old Zaku II, some characters remark upon how outdated it is. In contrast, others highlight its historical significance as an early example of widely mass-produced Mobile Suits.

=== Other Gundam series ===
The Zaku II design has also been included in storylines outside of the Universal Century, in the Cosmic Era series of Mobile Suit Gundam SEED Destiny where the director Mitsuo Fukuda requested the mecha designer Kunio Okawara to add his Zaku into the story. The ZAKU (ZAFT Armed Keeper of Unity) Warrior designed became a high-end model in the plot. The ZAKU Phantom is a commander unit. The Zaku series of Mobile Suits also appears in the CC Era of Turn A Gundam as the MS-06 Borjarnon and MS-05 Borjarnon Gavane Gooney Custom, which are excavated MS-06F Zaku II's and a slightly modified MS-05B Zaku I, respectively.

== Naming history ==
This mobile suit's original name was Zaku. In the non-official publication Gundam Century (which was later endorsed by Bandai as a semi-official guidebook), it was named the Zaku II to separate it from the MS-05 Zaku I (initially referred to simply as "Old Zaku" in the original series). The name was then officially endorsed, and all subsequent publications by either Sunrise or Bandai were referred to as Zaku II.

== Variations ==
The variants of the Zaku started the later militaristic variation boom of the Universal Century Gundam series, with many units having their own variant designs. Most of these units can be classified by the code given to it. There are Type A, B, C, D, E, E-3, F, F2, Fs, FZ, G, H, J, K, M, R-1, R-1A, R-2, RD-4, S, T, V, W, Z and various colour scheme featuring different pilots' colouring like World War I flying aces. Also, an official parody version called Saku is featured in a few games and manga.

=== Saku ===
First appeared online as a fan parody, later officially in the Gundam Ace magazine. The unit was a parody of the original Zaku II, but is much cheaper and was mass-produced in a much greater number than the original Zaku II. Its head has the katakana sign "Zi", the original word for "Zeon". It was a single pill-shaped body and head with a drawn mono-eye, with rope-like limbs and a "mouth" like an octopus. A red "Char Custom" version saku with a horn (antenna) is the leader of a large squad of green saku, and unknown named horned blue ones are a parody of the MS-07 Gouf.

=== MS-06F Zaku II ===
First appearing in Mobile Suit Gundam, the Zaku II Type F is by far the most common variant of the Zaku II seen in the One Year War. It saw action both on Earth and in space. Overall, more than 3000 units are known to have been manufactured and deployed during the war.

=== MS-06F2 Zaku II Type F2 ===
First appeared in Mobile Suit Gundam 0083: Stardust Memory, design by Hajime Katoki. Near the end of the One Year War, the Zeonic Company introduced an upgraded version of the MS-06F Zaku II, called MS-06F2 or Type F2. This upgraded model featured improved armor around the cockpit and a new Minovsky fusion reactor approximately 4% more powerful than the regular F-type's. It was also lighter than the previous model, making it more fuel efficient and giving it a longer flight time and overall improved performance. After the One Year War, F2s were still in use. Some were retained by Zeon remnants and units captured by the Federation, which were usually used as aggressor units in squadrons conducting pilot training and mobile suit field testing.

=== MS-06FZ Zaku II Last Mass Production Type (Zaku Kai) ===
First appeared in Mobile Suit Gundam 0080: War in the Pocket, designed by Yutaka Izubuchi. Developed very late during the One Year War as part of the "United Maintenance Plan", the MS-06FZ Zaku II Kai (Kai (改, Modified)) was an improved and redesigned version of the Zaku II. The United Maintenance Plan was an effort by the Zeon military to simplify the production of their different types of mobile suits by standardizing parts and systems where possible.

Due to the MS-06FZ Zaku II Kai's late introduction into the One Year War, only a handful of the units were produced. Few, if any, of the mobile suits survived the war. Originally, the OVA staff for Gundam 0080 intended for the FZ to be a retcon revision to the Zaku II. The Toy arm of Bandai came up with a separate backstory in order to keep selling both the 1979 and the new Zaku as model kits. The picture book MS Era illustrated by the same team still depicts the original concept.

=== MS-06S Zaku II Commander Type ===
Design by Kunio Okawara, the MS-06S Zaku II Commander Type (also known as the Zaku II Custom in some sources) looks very similar to the normal Zaku: so much so that the Earth Federation can generally only tell the difference from color schemes most pilots apply to their units and the increased performance of this version.

The S-Type Zaku II features a squad-leader "horn" that is mounted on the head of the Zaku II, which is used to distinguish squad leaders or higher-ranking pilots from other squad members or lower-ranking pilots. It also featured a more powerful fusion reactor. In turn, the S-Type Zaku II had greater thrust and acceleration. This allowed them to move at speeds 1/3 faster than an average Zaku II (in the original TV series, it was stated to be three times faster, but this was retconned in the movie trilogy to the more reasonable figure). This made it incredibly dangerous in the hands of the ace pilots it was handed out to, such as the "Red Comet" Char Aznable, who sank five warships during the Battle of Loum during the One Year War and whose mobile suit was painted in a fade tonality of red and pink.

=== Land Type variations ===
==== MS-06J Zaku II Ground Type ====
Appear as part of Mobile Suit Variations, designed by Kunio Okawara. The J-Type Zaku II was explicitly built for terrestrial operations and thus lacked space-specific equipment, greatly reducing its overall mass and cost. It also featured a slightly more powerful reactor to assist in its mobility under the full-gravity conditions of Earth. Compared to the F-type Zaku, the J-type was better insulated against its environment, and could be used in brief underwater operations. Its weapons were the same as its spaceborne counterpart, though a few weapons, such as the 175mm Magella Top gun were used only by the land types.

===== JC Subtype =====
Appears in Mobile Suit Gundam: The 08th MS Team, designed by Kunio Okawara. The land-battle Zakus appearing in the 08th MS Team anime were portrayed differently than in other anime: they were redesigned similarly to the Master Grade Zaku model kits that had been recently released, though with a few differences. Originally, the Zakus in 08th MS Team were identified as J-types, but recently this designation was retconned to MS-06Jc. The description of the JC-type Zaku on the official 08th MS Team website describes it as being similar to the J-type Zaku, but with features seen in the 08th MS Team anime, such as the redesigned cockpit and the spiked shield seen in the show's opening.

==== MS-06V Zaku Tank ====
First appear as part of Mobile Suit Variations and later got animated in Mobile Suit Zeta Gundam, designed by Kunio Okawara. A worker variant appears in Mobile Suit Gundam: The 08th MS Team, created by Kimitoshi Yamane. As the One Year War dragged on, the Zeon forces desperately needed replacement parts for their mobile suits and other weapons. Forced to salvage whatever they could, inoperable machines were often disassembled for replacement parts. New unit designs cobbled together from whatever was available to get more combat units to the field. One of the most common variations was the MS-06V Zaku Tank, created from mounting a Zaku torso, head and arms on the drive base of a Magella attack tank. These units were prized by field commanders starved for replacement mobile suits and were used for both construction and combat.

=== Reconnaissance Type variations ===
w:ja:ザクII強行偵察型 The reconnaissance models were said to be used to team up with other mobile suits to launch skirmish attacks on enemies and determine by the countering numbers how many forces the enemy had in the area.

==== MS-06E Zaku Reconnaissance Type ====
First appear as part of Mobile Suit Variations and later got animated in Mobile Suit Zeta Gundam, design by Kunio Okawara. The MS-06E Zaku Reconnaissance Type, or just Zaku Recon Type for short, was designed for scouting and reconnaissance missions. These Zaku Recon Types, or E-Types, mounted specialized camera guns and sensor systems.

==== MS-06E-3 Zaku Flipper ====
First appear as part of Mobile Suit Variations, design by Kunio Okawara. A handful of the one hundred or so MS-06E Zaku Reconnaissance Types built during the One Year War were further upgraded into the MS-06E-3 Zaku Flipper. The Zaku Flipper was designed to play the role of a reconnaissance and scouting unit. It got its name from the creator because instead of a standard mono-eye head, its head is three-eyed with two large fins (flips) next to it as high-powered radar that can even penetrate Minovsky particle.

=== MS-11 Action Zaku ===
It first appeared as part of Mobile Suit Variations and later got animated in Mobile Suit Zeta Gundam, designed by Kunio Okawara. The MS-11 Action Zaku, often referred to as Act Zaku for short, is a Principality of Zeon prototype mobile suit based on the MS-06 Zaku II.

However, the Act Zaku was introduced too late for the Principality of Zeon. When the Earth Federation Forces captured the Pezun asteroid, they obtained the designs for the Action Zaku, and the concept of magnetic joint coating. The Earth Federation would put the Act Zaku into production for their use after the One Year War.

=== Worker Type variations ===
w:ja:作業用ザクII

==== MS-06F (MS-06H) Zaku Minelayer ====
First appear as part of Mobile Suit Variations, designed by Kunio Okawara. The Zaku Minelayer is a standard MS-06F Zaku II equipped with a different style backpack. With this new backpack, the Zaku II is adapted to be a mine-laying unit. The new backpack houses several drums filled with space mines, with twelve mines packed into every drum. The backpack also has a few additional maneuvering thrusters and carries five times the fuel of a standard Zaku II. However, the Zaku Minelayer requires a particular loading area on a Musai-Class Light Cruiser to reload, launch, or land.

==== MS-06W Worker Zaku ====
First appear as part of Mobile Suit Variations, designed by Kunio Okawara. The Worker Zaku was a variant of the traditional Zaku design designed exclusively for labour. The unit's cockpit was modified and constructed from the cockpit of a standard construction vehicle, allowing someone without military training to pilot the suit. The suits were fielded in West Asia until the production was moved towards the MS-06V, which used most of the same parts as the MS-06W.

=== Psycommu Test Type Variations ===
==== MS-06Z (MS-06Z-3) Psycommu Test Type Zaku II ====
First appear as part of Mobile Suit Variations, design by Kunio Okawara. The MS-06Z Psycommu Test Type Zaku II was the final Zaku variant developed under the MS-16X "Bishop" plan. Three test units were created, but the plan was halted due to a fatal flaw. The suit's incredibly high energy consumption meant they could only fight for 10 minutes. The wire-guided forearms with beam cannons mounted in each of the fingers were almost identical to those later implemented in the MSN-02 Zeong. Additionally, the suit's unique weaponry, psycomm system, and additional apogee thrusters brought the price of the suit up to the equivalent of several Zaku IIs.

=== Post-war Insurgent variations ===
w:ja:ザクIIのバリエーション

==== MS-21C Dra-C ====
First appeared in Mobile Suit Gundam 0083: Stardust Memory, designed by Mika Akitaka. After the end of the One Year War many of the Zeon remnants that refused to let the war end in anything less than victory retreated from the Earth Sphere and went into hiding. While in exile these renegade fleets slowly built up their forces, plotting to renew their conflict against the Earth Federation.

There were little supplies available to the Zeon remnants, so to build up their forces, the Dra-C was built from salvaged parts and mobile suit components (notably the torsos and arms of Zaku II F2s). This new machine is a space-only, high-speed interceptor Mobile Suit. Its standard armaments were light; most units were fielded with a 40mm vulcan gun and a beam saber-equipped shield on the left arm, though some have been shown with larger beam gatling guns. The Delaz Fleet remnants notably used this mobile suit during the Delaz Conflict of 0083, and some would continue to see some use at least another thirteen years afterward, in the hands of the Axis Fleet during both the Gryps Conflict of 0087–0088, and by the Sleeves in 0096.

As a retcon, the Dra-C appears as part of the Axis fleet in a dark-gray color scheme in the third Zeta Gundam film, and a pink color scheme with a gatling gun in episode 3 of Gundam Unicorn.

==== MS-06F (Stutzer version) ====
Appear in Advance of Zeta: The Flag of Titans photonovel, design by Kenki Fujioka. After the One Year War, the remnants of the Zeon forces upgraded their Zaku II units to this MS-06F Zaku II "Stutzer" configuration to counter the Titans' new machines, as Zeon no longer had any production capabilities for any new mobile suit designs. The Zaku II "Stutzer" was enhanced with winch units, which were able to launch wire-guided arm parts that could entangle enemy machines with wire, or throw hand grenades at them while the mobile suit itself remained hidden. Additionally, the Stutzer mounted the MS-14A Gelgoog's beam rifle, powered by an auxiliary generator on its back.

=== Novel version ===
In the Mobile Suit Gundam novel by Yoshiyuki Tomino, Zaku fingers contain Laser Touch to burn its way through obstructions, and its boosters can bring it to jump to a height of 800m.

=== Descendants of the Zaku II series ===
Although the original Zaku II was obsolete by the end of Zeon's war for independence, its design was frequently revisited in following conflicts; for instance, the RMS-106 Hi-Zack (a hybrid between Zeon's Zaku and Federation's GM) of the Gryps Conflict, the AMX-011 Zaku III of the first Neo Zeon movement, (to a lesser extent) the AMS-119 Geara Doga of the second Neo Zeon movement, the AMS-129 Geara Zulu of the third Neo Zeon movement, and the OMS-06RF RF Zaku of the Mars Zeon Rebellion.

== Popular culture ==
=== Modeling competition ===
There is an Ore Zaku ("My Zaku") competition held by Hobby Japan every year, where modellers can only use Zaku models to enter.

=== Parts collection ===
Merchandise like shoulder armour and antenna (horn) of the Zaku are available and a new series of products by Banpresto called Parts Collection for UFO catchers features four parts of the Zaku, a shoulder spike armor piece that is a radio, a body as a toolbox, shoulder shield as a clock and head as a light. The four parts can be combined to form a roughly 1/35 scale Zaku. Each part has 3 different colors, and thus users can build different variants.

=== Forklift ===
The two forklift trucks used in the Bandai Hobby Centre in Shizuoka are named "MS-06 Zaku" and "MS-06S Zaku Char's Custom" and painted in green and red respectively with a mono-eye in the front panel of the truck.

=== Stamps ===
The Japanese post office released two stamps with a Zaku II on it, one with a Zaku as the background and Gundam in the foreground and one featuring Char's Custom Zaku II.

=== Razor blades ===
In addition to the traditional modeling kits, the Kai Razor company has made a Char's custom Zaku II razor blade.

=== Cell phone ===
Sharp have released (through Softbank Japan) a 913SH G Type-Char cell phone with an MS-06S Zaku II Commander Type (Char's custom) head as the battery charging compartment. The red Zeon symbol in the front cover of the cell phone will serve as the eye of the Zaku when placed inside.

== Reception ==
The Zaku design has been described as "one of the most beloved and iconic mecha designs from the Gundam franchise".

== See also ==
- Hizack (RGM-79 GM x MS-06 Zaku II) - ハイザック(HIZACK / HI-ZACK)
