= OL Shinkaron =

Office lady manga series

- First tankōbon volume cover

OL進化論 (Ōeru Shinkaron)
- Manga
- Written by: Risu Akizuki
- Published by: Kodansha
- Imprint: Wide KC Morning
- Magazine: Morning
- Original run: November 1989 – present
- Volumes: 42
- Manga

Okusama Shinkaron
- Written by: Risu Akizuki
- Published by: Kodansha
- Volumes: 1
- icon

OL Shinkaron (Japanese: OL進化論, Hepburn: Ōeru Shinkaron; lit. 'Theory of OL Evolution') is a Japanese yonkoma manga series by Risu Akizuki about OLs, or office ladies. It follows the daily lives of Minako and Jun, the coworkers, friends, family, and neighbors. It also had a short, spin-off series titled Okusama Shinkaron that focused on housewives.

Several different translations in English, including two bilingual Japanese/English series titled Survival in the Office and OL Revolution, have been published. The manga, along with Akizuki's other works, won the 2004 short story award at the Tezuka Osamu Cultural Prizes.

== Synopsis ==
The manga is episodic and follows the daily lives of Minako and Jun, two office ladies working in post-bubble Japan. Each vignette contains a gag about happenings at the office where Minako and Jun work, socializing after work, vacations, or interactions with their friends, family, and neighbors.

As the series progresses, there are a number of secondary characters who make regular appearances in the manga, including Jun's boss and his wife, Ichirō, Satsuki, Keiko, Hiromi, Tanaka, an old man who runs a diner, Morishita, Jun's parents, and others.

== Publication ==
Written and illustrated by Risu Akizuki, OL Shinkaron began serialization as a yonkoma manga on Kodansha's seinen manga magazine Morning in November 1989, in that year's 50th issue. (Note: Cover dated November 23, 1989.)

=== Volumes ===
The manga was collected in the following tankōbon volumes, published by Kodansha under their "Wide KC" imprint:

- Volume 1 (October 1990, ISBN 4061765949)
- Volume 2 (June 1991, ISBN 4061766074)
- Volume 3 (December 1991, ISBN 4061766201)
- Volume 4 (June 1992, ISBN 4061766414)
- Volume 5 (January 1993, ISBN 4061766694)
- Volume 6 (September 1993, ISBN 406176697X)
- Volume 7 (April 1994, ISBN 4061767283)
- Volume 8 (December 1994, ISBN 4061767526)
- Volume 9 (July 1995, ISBN 4061767739)
- Volume 10 (March 1996, ISBN 406176795X)
- Volume 11 (November 1996, ISBN 4063373142)
- Volume 12 (May 1997, ISBN 4063373312)
- Volume 13 (March 1998, ISBN 406337355X)
- Volume 14 (October 1998, ISBN 4063373754)
- Volume 15 (October 1999, ISBN 4063374173)
- Volume 16 (March 2000, ISBN 406337436X)
- Volume 17 (November 2000, ISBN 4063374572)
- Volume 18 (August 2001, ISBN 4063374726)
- Volume 19 (May 2002, ISBN 4063374939)
- Volume 20 (September 2003, ISBN 4063375307)
- Volume 21 (May 2004, ISBN 4063375463)
- Volume 22 (November 2004, ISBN 4063375587)
- Volume 23 (May 2005, ISBN 9784063375718)
- Volume 24 (December 2005, ISBN 4063375897)
- Volume 25 (June 2006, ISBN 406337601X)
- Volume 26 (January 2007, ISBN 9784063376081)
- Volume 27 (September 2007, ISBN 9784063376234)
- Volume 28 (June 2008, ISBN 9784063376432)
- Volume 29 (May 2009, ISBN 9784063376722)
- Volume 30 (March 2010, ISBN 9784063376869)
- Volume 31 (March 2011, ISBN 9784063377040)
- Volume 32 (October 2011, ISBN 9784063377323)
- Volume 33 (July 2012, ISBN 9784063377491)
- Volume 34 (March 2013, ISBN 9784063377774)
- Volume 35 (November 2013, ISBN 9784063377897)
- Volume 36 (December 2014, ISBN 9784063378115)
- Volume 37 (December 2015, ISBN 9784063378351)
- Volume 38 (February 2020, ISBN 9784063378566)
- Volume 39 (July 2020, ISBN 9784065201107)
- Volume 40 (August 2020, ISBN 9784065204092)
- Volume 41 (September 2020, ISBN 9784065205488
- Volume 42 (October 2020, ISBN 9784065205471)

Two volumes under the title The OL Comes of Age were published as part of Kodansha's English Library series:

- Volume 1 (November 1994, ISBN 4770022751)
- Volume 2 (March 1999, ISBN 4770024274)

Kodansha also published bilingual editions through Kodansha International:

Survival in the Office:

- Volume 1 (September 1999, ISBN 4770023901)
- Volume 2 (March 2000, ISBN 4770025017)
- Volume 3 (July 2000, ISBN 4770025025)
- Volume 4 (October 2000, ISBN 4770026951)
- Volume 5 (September 2000, ISBN 477002696X)

OL Revolution:

- Volume 1 (September 2005, ISBN 4770040237)
- Volume 2 (September 2005, ISBN 4770040245)
- Volume 3 (September 2005, ISBN 4770040253)

=== Spinoffs ===
OL Shinkaron had a number of spin-offs and related works:

- Ochakumi Enjerusu (お茶くみエンジェルス; lit. 'Tea-Serving Angels'). This short series served as a precursor to OL Shinkaron. It has not been published in a collection.
- OL Chintara Pon-chan (OLちんたらポンちゃん). Ran in Josei Jishin and featured a character named Pon-chan who looked just like Jun from OL Shinkaron. Collected by Kobunsha in one volume in November 1992 (ISBN 4334801773).
- Okusama Shinkaron (奥さま進化論; lit. 'Theory of Wife Evolution'): A yonkoma series that ran in Kodansha's Morning Party Zōkan (モーニングパーティー増刊, Mōningu Pātī Zōkan) magazine from 1988 to 1990. The series focused on housewives and was collected in one tankōbon volume in January 1992 (ISBN 406176621X).

== Awards and recognition ==
This series, in conjunction with Akizuki's other works, received the Tezuka Osamu Cultural Prize in the short story category in 2004.
