= What's Michael? =

Manga

- First tankōbon volume cover
- Manga
- Written by: Makoto Kobayashi
- Published by: Kodansha
- English publisher: US: Eclipse Comics (1990); Dark Horse Comics (1997–present)
- Imprint: Wide KC Morning (1985–1989); KC Deluxe (2003)
- Magazine: Morning; (1984–1989); Evening; (2001–2003)
- English magazine: US: Mangajin; Super Manga Blast!
- Original run: February 1984 – 22 April 2003
- Volumes: 9
- Series titles
- 1. What's Michael? (1984–1989, 8 volumes); 2. What's Michael? 9-Kanme (2001–2003, 1 volume)
- Original video animation
- Studio: Kitty Film Mitaka Studio
- Released: 25 November 1985 – 25 July 1988
- Runtime: 50–60 minutes
- Episodes: 2
- Anime television series
- Directed by: Masakazu Higuchi
- Produced by: Jean Chalopin; Hyota Ezu; Ryōhei Suzuki; Tomoyuki Ikeda; Yukio Kawasaki
- Written by: Satoru Akahori
- Music by: Kōji Makaino; Michiaki Katō
- Studio: K.K. C&D Asia
- Original network: TV Tokyo
- Original run: 15 April 1988 – 28 March 1989
- Episodes: 45
- icon

What's Michael? is a Japanese manga series created by Makoto Kobayashi. It was originally serialized in Kodansha's seinen manga magazine Morning from February 1984 to September 1989, and in its sister magazine, Evening, from December 2001 to April 2003. The manga shows Michael, an orange American Shorthair tabby cat, his feline friends, and other domesticated pets in a series of humorous episodes. Michael is not a specific cat, but rather a feline version of the everyman as he appeared in drastically different settings across chapters: he's a normal cat in some chapters (with different owners in different chapters), an anthropomorphic cat in others, and he even dies in some chapters.

== Plot ==
Most episodes of the series fall into one of two kinds of stories. The first portrays the cats in a realistic way, living out normal lives with their owners. It finds humor in how humans observe their pets' naturally quirky behavior. The second type of story is complete fantasy in which all the animals are given anthropomorphic characteristics such as walking on two legs, wearing clothes, and being able to talk to each other; these episodes place the animals in a storyline that mixes up their human personae with normal animal behavior.

== Media ==
=== Manga ===
Written and illustrated by Makoto Kobayashi, What's Michael? was serialized in Kodansha's seinen manga magazine Morning starting in February 1984, in the magazine's fourth issue of that year. (Note: Cover date 16 February 1984.) It completed serialization in September 1989, in the magazine's 41st issue of that year. (Note: Cover date 21 September 1989.) Its chapters were compiled in eight tankōbon volumes, published between 14 January 1985, and 14 December 1989. It was later republished in eight bunkobon volumes, released between 2 December 1994, and 3 April 1995.

The series was revived in full color on Morning's sister magazine, Evening, under the title What's Michael? 9-Kanme (What's Michael? 9巻め; 'What's Michael? Volume 9'), where it was serialized from 19 December 2001, to 22 April 2003. One tankōbon volume was published on 21 May 2003.

Eclipse Comics with Studio Proteus originally released a two-volume collection in 1990 in both softcover and hardcover versions for the American market.

After Eclipse Comics filed for bankruptcy, Studio Proteus transferred the publishing rights over to Dark Horse Comics, who released the series in America as eleven volumes between 1997 and 2006. Dark Horse Comics then released two omnibus volumes under the "Fatcat Collection" between 2020 and 2021. "Fatcat Collection" volume one covers the original volumes 1–6 while "Fatcat Collection" volume two covers the original volumes 7–11.

All the American releases of the manga by Eclipse Comics and Dark Horse Comics are presented in the standard left to right American reading format, with the artwork flipped to change the reading style.

=== Anime adaptations ===
The manga was adapted into two anime OVA films in 1985 and 1988 by Kitty Films, and a 45-episode TV series produced by K.K. C&D Asia.

=== Video games ===
Two licensed video games based on the manga were released in Japan. Michael's Big English Adventure (マイケルEnglish大冒険), an English-language educational game for the Famicom Disk System, was published by Scorpion Soft in 1987. The player collects letters falling from the sky to spell English words. The rival cat Nyajira and other characters from the manga appear in the game. A graphic adventure game, What's Michael?, was developed and published by Microcabin for the PC-8801 and PC-9801 in January 1989 and for the MSX2 in June 1989. It was one of several licensed manga and anime graphic adventures released by Microcabin in the late 1980s.

== Reception ==
In 1986, What's Michael? received the Kodansha Manga Award for general manga.
