= Makoto Kobayashi (artist) =

Japanese manga artist (born 1958)

- Born: May 13, 1958 (age 68); Niigata, Niigata Prefecture
- Occupation: Manga artist
- Writing career
- Period: 1978–present
- Subject: manga

Makoto Kobayashi (小林 まこと, Kobayashi Makoto) (born May 13, 1958) is a Japanese manga artist who is best known for his unusual drawing style. One of his best known manga is What's Michael?, a manga about a curious orange cat and his many adventures that is often compared with Garfield. His earliest work is Grapple Three Brothers, which won the Shōnen magazine New manga artist award. He has twice won the Kodansha Manga Award, for Sanshiro of 1, 2 in 1981 and What's Michael? in 1986.

== Works ==
=== Manga ===
- Grapple Three Brothers
- Sanshirō of 1, 2
- Judo-bu Monogatari (Story of a Judo Club)
- JJM: Joshi Judou-bu Monogatari
- I am Makkoi
- Club 9
- Gaburin (Goblin)
- Chichonmanchi (Hell of Love & Ecstasy) (Stairway to Heaven)
- What's Michael?
- Go Iwashimizu
- Gekiha Hasegawa Shin
- White Spotted Butterfly
- Yuki-Onna
- Fighting Detectives

=== Anime ===
- Judo Bu Monogatari OAV
- What's Michael? OAV
- What's Michael? 2 OAV
- What's Michael? TV
