= Mobile Suit Gundam: Journey to Jaburo =

2000 video game

- North American cover art
- Developer: Bandai
- Publisher: Bandai
- Composers: Takanori Arima; Koji Yamada
- Platform: PlayStation 2
- Release: JP: December 21, 2000; NA: August 6, 2001
- Genre: Action
- Mode: Single-player

Mobile Suit Gundam: Journey to Jaburo (機動戦士ガンダム, Kidō Senshi Gandamu; lit."Mobile Suit Gundam") is an action game based directly on the Mobile Suit Gundam films and series. The game begins at the start of the series and ends at the ending of the second film. The game plays in an action game format with a standard third-person view. It features newly hand animated cutscenes that depict events from the original television series as well as a CGI opening depicting a space battle from the One Year War and then a scene of the Gundam destroying several Zaku IIs before being attacked by Char Aznable. A sequel, Mobile Suit Gundam: Encounters in Space, was released in 2003.

The English dub of the video game features the voices of the actors who were cast for the Mobile Suit Gundam television series as with most games subsequent to the series' dubbing, rather than the English cast of the films.

== Plot ==
Journey to Jaburo takes place during the One Year War, and depicts the crew of the White Base making their way from the Side 7 sector of space colonies to the Federation headquarters at Jaburo. The game starts at Amuro Ray's home of Side 7, where three Zaku mobile suits attack the Federation's prototype mobile suit weapons. Amuro, in the confusion, fights the Zaku units in the Gundam, and is assigned to the White Base as the Gundam's pilot. After the White Base leaves the colony, it is pursued by Char Aznable, "The Red Comet".

Char attacks the White Base during re-entry (where the power of the Gundam's beam rifle was revealed), which diverts them into the Zeon-controlled territory of North America. After going through many Zeon defenses (including Garma Zabi in Seattle), the White Base heads into Asia, where they battle Ramba Ral, an ace pilot who raised Sayla Mass when she was a child. After Ramba Ral commits suicide by jumping into Gundam's hand with a grenade, the White Base crew makes their way to Belfast for repairs.

After they leave Belfast, they eventually make it to Jaburo, where Char's "Mad Angler" squadron finds the location of the base, and launches a massive attack to conquer it. The Zeon forces are beaten back, and the White Base, now dubbed the "13th Autonomous Mobile Squadron", heads out into space.

== Tactics Battle ==
Tactics Battle mode is an optional mode available once story mode has been completed. In this mode you play either a Federation or Zeon pilot who remains nameless and faceless. You begin at a low rank and with only one mission available to each side. As you successfully complete the missions available with the MS available your rank increases and more missions and MS are unlocked. Five Missions can be unlocked in total. The first three are standard attack or defense missions, they are available to both factions, though what your role is varies by faction. The last two are available only to the Federation. These are duels with the RX-79BD-1 GM Blue Destiny Unit 1, and RX-78NT-1 Gundam "Alex" being piloted by Yuu Kajima and Christina MacKenzie, respectively. Christina compliments you during battle, whereas Yuu remains silent while in his duel Maureen Kitamura spurs him onward with encouraging remarks.

After each mission is completed a verbal assessment is given either by Matilda Ajan, Kergerenko, or Char Aznable. After this there are brief cutscenes featuring either Matilda or Kergerenko complimenting the player on their performance. If the player fails a mission, but does not retry it they will reprimand the player. As certain circumstances are met cutscenes with Char, M'Quve and Bright Noa are unlocked. There are also cutscenes featuring Christina, Shiro Amada and a White Dingo pilot when each allows use of their Mobile Suit. If the player continues fighting and raises their rank to Colonel in either faction they receive a special reward video. On the Zeon route this is a video of the major members of the Principality of Zeon thanking the player for their service, on the Federation side it is video of the major female members of the Federation from MS Gundam, War in the Pocket, and Blue Destiny competing for attention as they enthusiastically thank the player.

== Cast ==
Character	English voice actor	Japanese voice actor
Amuro Ray	Brad Swaile	Tōru Furuya
Bright Noa	Chris Kalhoon	Hirotaka Suzuoki
Char Aznable	Michael Kopsa	Shūichi Ikeda
Sayla Mass	Alaina Burnett	Yō Inoue
Fraw Bow	Kristie Marsden	Rumiko Ukai
Mirai Yashima	Cathy Weseluck	Fuyumi Shiraishi

== List of mecha ==
=== Earth Federation Forces ===
==== Mobile weapons ====
- RGM-79 GM
- RX-75 Guntank
- RX-77 Guncannon
- RX-78-2 Gundam
- RX-79(G) Gundam Ground Type
- RGM-79SP GM Sniper II
- RX-79BD-1 GM Blue Destiny Unit 1
- RX-78NT-1 Gundam "Alex"

==== Vehicles and support units (non-playable) ====
- FF-X7-Bst Core Booster
- G-Fighter
- Type 61 Tank

=== Principality of Zeon ===
==== Mobile weapons ====
- MS-05 Zaku I
- MS-06 Zaku II (Alternate Color Scheme: Desert)
- MS-06S Zaku II Commander Type
- MS-06Fs Zaku II Garma Zabi Custom
- MS-07 Gouf
- MS-07B Gouf (Alternate Color Scheme: MS-07B-3 Custom)
- MS-09 Dom
- MS-18E Kämpfer
- MSM-03 Gogg
- MSM-03C Hygogg
- MSM-04 Acguy
- MSM-07 Z'Gok
- MSM-07S Z'Gok Commander Type
- MSM-10 Zock
- MAX-03 Adzam (Non-Playable)

===== Vehicles and support units (non-playable) =====
- Gallop-Class Land Battleship
- Magella Attack Tank
- Dopp Fighter
- Gaw Atmospheric Attack Carrier
- Wappa
- Luggun

== Reception ==
Reception

Aggregate score
Aggregator	Score
Metacritic	58/100

Review scores
Publication	Score
AllGame	3/5
Electronic Gaming Monthly	4/10
Famitsu	27/40
Game Informer	6.5/10
GamePro	3.5/5
GameRevolution	D+
GameSpot	6.8/10
GameSpy	68%
IGN	6.5/10
Next Generation	2/5
Official U.S. PlayStation Magazine	1/5

The game "mixed" reviews according to the review aggregation website Metacritic. David Smith of IGN said, "...it's not a recommended purchase for those who aren't fans of the series (...), but it was never intended to be anything else." Jim Preston of NextGen said of the game, "The mixture between television show and videogame is superb, but the actual gameplay is not." In Japan, Famitsu gave it a score of 27 out of 40.

== See also ==
- Mobile Suit Gundam
- List of Gundam video games
