= Mobile Suit Gundam: The Origin =

Japanese manga series

- Volume one cover of Mobile Suit Gundam: The Origin manga

機動戦士ガンダム THE ORIGIN (Kidō Senshi Gandamu Ji Orijin)
- Genre: Mecha, military science fiction, space opera
- Created by: Hajime Yatate; Yoshiyuki Tomino
- Manga
- Written by: Yoshikazu Yasuhiko
- Published by: Kadokawa Shoten
- English publisher: NA: Viz Media (former) Vertical Inc. (current)
- Magazine: Gundam Ace
- Original run: June 25, 2001 – June 25, 2011
- Volumes: 24
- Original video animation
- Directed by: Yoshikazu Yasuhiko; Takashi Imanishi
- Produced by: Osamu Taniguchi
- Written by: Katsuyuki Sumisawa
- Music by: Takayuki Hattori
- Studio: Sunrise
- Licensed by: NA: Sunrise; UK: Anime Limited
- Released: February 28, 2015 – May 5, 2018
- Runtime: 58–84 minutes
- Episodes: 6
- Manga

Mobile Suit Gundam: The Origin MSD: Cucuruz Doan's Island
- Written by: Junji Ōno
- Published by: Kadokawa Shoten
- English publisher: NA: Vertical Inc.
- Magazine: Gundam Ace
- Original run: June 25, 2016 – May 25, 2019
- Volumes: 5
- Anime television series

Advent of the Red Comet
- Directed by: Yoshikazu Yasuhiko; Takashi Imanishi
- Produced by: Osamu Taniguchi
- Written by: Katsuyuki Sumisawa
- Music by: Takayuki Hattori
- Studio: Sunrise
- Licensed by: NA: Sunrise
- Original network: NHK General TV
- English network: US: Adult Swim (Toonami)
- Original run: April 29, 2019 – August 12, 2019
- Episodes: 13

Mobile Suit Gundam: The Origin (Japanese: 機動戦士ガンダム THE ORIGIN, Hepburn: Kidō Senshi Gandamu Ji Orijin) is a Japanese manga series written and illustrated by Yoshikazu Yasuhiko. It is a retelling of the story from the 1979 anime television series Mobile Suit Gundam, of which Yasuhiko was the original character designer.

An original video animation adaptation of the manga, focusing on the stories of Casval Rem Deikun (more famously known as Char Aznable) and his sister Artesia (aka Sayla Mass), produced by Sunrise was released between 2015 and 2018 in six parts. Yasuhiko was the chief director of the adaptation, with Sunrise veteran Takashi Imanishi as director, and Katsuyuki Sumisawa as the scriptwriter. A 13-episode anime television recompilation of the OVAs aired on NHK General TV in 2019.

== Plot ==
The plot of the manga follows somewhat closely to the plot of the original series. It is the year Universal Century 0079, and the eighth month of a vicious war between the Earth Federation and a breakaway nation of space colonists, the Principality of Zeon. The story follows the crew of the warship White Base, as they fight to ferry the experimental RX-78-02 Gundam mobile suit from the partially constructed space colony Side 7 to the Federation base at Jaburo, South America.

Although for the most part faithful to the original series' plot (all of the major events unfold in mostly the same manner as the TV series, though often in different locales), Yasuhiko has taken the liberty of changing certain elements in the series universe, giving a different character to the series and the struggle that unfolds. Primary among these is the presence of mobile suits in both sides well before the conflict begins—in fact, in the flashback sequences, both the Earth Federation Forces and Zeon use Guntanks in 0068, and they and the Guncannon mobile suit are described as "obsolete" and fit for target practice in the first volume (in the TV series proper, both the RX-75 and the RX-77 were as new as the RX-78 Gundam itself, designed to serve as long- and mid-range fire support units).

Other differences concern the breadth of the Gundam's journey to Jaburo. While the TV series has the White Base reach Jaburo beneath the Amazon basin via Central Asia, Odessa, Northern Ireland, and the Atlantic, (Note: In episodes 16–29 of Mobile Suit Gundam.) Yasuhiko's journey places the White Base's landfall near Lake Mead, (Note: In volume 3 of the tankōbon/volume 2 of the aizōban.) and the headquarters of Garma Zabi in Los Angeles, (Note: In the tenth episode of Mobile Suit Gundam, Garma was based out of a generic "New York" — volumes 2–4 (tankōbon)/1 and 2 (aizōban) of Origin in fact state the Zeon occupation HQ as Los Angeles City Hall, with Garma residing in Hollywood/Beverly Hills.) and moves the craft steadily to the southeast, and down the South American coast—past Caracas and through Machu Picchu and into the Guiana Highlands, under which Jaburo, the headquarters of the Earth Federation, is located. This retelling cuts out some of the more trivial encounters seen in the original series, while keeping and expanding on important characters like Garma, Ramba Ral, and the Black Tri-Stars. As a direct result the events of Operation Odessa which takes place around the Ukrainian city of the same name, occur after the events of Jaburo, as opposed to TV series where they occur before. (Note: Operation Odessa takes place in episode 25 of Mobile Suit Gundam. The White Base lands in and defends Jaburo in episodes 29 and 30.)

Yasuhiko further finally tells the entire back story of the Mobile Suit Gundam universe in the manga. After the successful defense of Jaburo, the story diverts into a very in-depth flashback, told primarily from the viewpoints of Sayla and Char (with a secondary thread being told from Amuro's POV) recounting the downfall of Zeon Zum Deikun, the rise of the Zabi family, the construction of Side 7 and the research into mobile suits, and leading up through a decade until the launching of the One Year War. It also goes into detail answering many previously unanswered questions such as the appearance of heretofore unseen Zeon mobile suits prior to the MS-05 Zaku I, how Dozle Zabi received his trademark scars and even the origin of Casval Deikun/Edward Mass' "Char Aznable" identity. Volume fourteen, deals with the Battle of Loum at the beginning of the One Year War, and is the last piece of the in-depth flashback.

The story shifted back on track to the storyline of the original TV series, featuring the White Base's involvement in the Federation's Operation Odessa, as well as including Kai Shiden's encounter with Miharu. (Note: Kai meets Miharu in episodes 26–28 of Mobile Suit Gundam.) Afterwards, the manga deals with the end of the Odessa campaign and, in another departure from the series, takes M'Quve and his Gyan out of the picture before he has a chance to confront the Gundam.

== Media ==
=== Manga ===
The series was first serialized in the magazine Gundam Ace in Japan from 2001 to 2011 and has been collected in 24 tankōbon volumes, with the last volume, published in 2015, containing extra side stories. It was published by Kadokawa Shoten under their Kadokawa Comics A imprint. Viz Comics attempted to translate the series and publish it in America in a quarterly, perfect-bound magazine-sized format, although low sales very quickly ended the American run.

Although Viz released 12 volumes of its English translation, they do not correspond with the Japanese volumes. The English volumes, with an average length between 100 and 130 pages were about half of that of the equivalent Japanese tankōbon, which ran anywhere between 200 and 270. The length varied as some contained just four chapters, some contained an additional "special" shorter side story, and others contained a full five chapters. The reason for this could be that the Japanese serialization focused on keeping distinct chapters. As a result, the English serialization ended up having a higher price point than its Japanese equivalent with only roughly half of the content. The Viz release stopped near the end of volume six in the Japanese version.

The popularity of the manga in Japan has led to the release of aizōban or Collector's Edition versions. Each collector's edition combines two tankōbon volumes (combining the beginning and end sections into one), creating large, leather bound, hardback editions with dozens of pages printed in full color, as opposed to about 5 pages per tankōbon.

At Otakon 2012, North American publisher Vertical announced that it will publish an English language adaptation of the series in hardcover format similar to the aizōban editions. The first volume was released on March 26, 2013, and the series was completed with the publishing of the 12th volume on December 17, 2015. From August 12, 2025, to June 9, 2026, Vertical (by this time, an imprint of Kodansha USA) released the aizōban editions as six double-length "deluxe" volumes.

A spinoff of the manga, titled Mobile Suit Gundam: The Origin MSD: Cucuruz Doan's Island (Japanese: 機動戦士ガンダム THE ORIGIN MSD ククルス·ドアンの島, Hepburn: Kidō Senshi Gandamu THE ORIGIN MSD Kukurusu Doan no Shima), was written by Junji Ōno and serialized in Gundam Ace from June 25, 2016, to May 25, 2019, ten years after the original manga's serialization, and collected into five tankobon volumes. The manga serves as a prequel to episode 15 of the original TV series. Kodansha USA announced in March 2024 that they licensed the manga for North American release, with the volumes released by Vertical from October 1, 2024, to June 3, 2025.

==== Tankōbon volume list ====
No.	Title	Japanese release date	Japanese ISBN
1	Activation; Shidō-hen (始動編)	June 1, 2002	4-04-713453-8
2	Fierce Fighting; Gekitō-hen (激闘編)	July 26, 2002	4-04-713503-8
3	Garma (Beginning); Garuma-hen (Zen) (ガルマ編・前)	November 19, 2002 (SE); November 26, 2002 (RE)	4-04-713519-4 (SE); 4-04-713518-6 (RE)
4	Garma (End); Garuma-hen (Go) (ガルマ編・後)	March 20, 2003	4-04-713545-3
5	Ramba Ral (Beginning); Ranba Raru-hen (Zen) (ランバ・ラル編・前)	July 20, 2003 (LE); July 25, 2003 (RE)	4-04-713557-7
6	Ramba Ral (End); Ranba Raru-hen (Go) (ランバ・ラル編・後)	March 26, 2004	4-04-713611-5
7	Jaburo (Beginning); Jaburō-hen (Zen) (ジャブロー編・前)	July 26, 2004	4-04-713647-6
8	Jaburo (End); Jaburō-hen (Go) (ジャブロー編・後)	November 26, 2004	4-04-713680-8
9	Char & Sayla (Beginning); Shaa Seira-hen (Zen) (シャア・セイラ編・前)	April 26, 2005	4-04-713714-6
10	Char & Sayla (End); Shaa Seira-hen (Go) (シャア・セイラ編・後)	August 26, 2005	4-04-713746-4
11	To War (Beginning); Kaisen-hen (Zen) (開戦編・前)	December 26, 2005	4-04-713771-5
12	To War (End); Kaisen-hen (Go) (開戦編・後)	April 26, 2006	4-04-713805-3
13	Loum (Beginning); Ruumu-hen (Zen) (ルウム編・前)	July 26, 2006	4-04-713850-9
14	Loum (End); Ruumu-hen (Go) (ルウム編・後)	December 26, 2006	4-04-713883-5
15	Odessa (Beginning); Odessa-hen (Zen) (オデッサ編・前)	May 26, 2007	978-4-04-713920-6
16	Odessa (End); Odessa-hen (Go) (オデッサ編・後)	November 26, 2007	978-4-04-713987-9
17	Lalah (Beginning); Raraa-hen (Zen) (ララァ編・前)	June 26, 2008	978-4-04-715075-1
18	Lalah (End); Raraa-hen (Go) (ララァ編・後)	December 26, 2008	978-4-04-715145-1
19	Solomon (Beginning); Soromon-hen (Zen) (ソロモン編・前)	June 26, 2009	978-4-04-715260-1
20	Solomon (End); Soromon-hen (Go) (ソロモン編・後)	January 26, 2010	978-4-04-715285-4
21	A Cosmic Glow (Beginning); Hikaru Uchū-hen (Zen) (ひかる宇宙編・前)	July 26, 2010	978-4-04-715482-7
22	A Cosmic Glow (End); Hikaru Uchū-hen (Go) (ひかる宇宙編・後)	February 26, 2011	978-4-04-715601-2
23	Encounters in Space; Meguriai Uchū-hen (めぐりあい宇宙編)	November 26, 2011	978-4-04-715770-5
24	Special; Tokubetsu-hen (特別編)	February 26, 2015	978-4-04-102794-3

==== Aizōban volume list ====
No.	Title	Original release date	English release date
1	Activation; Shidō-hen (始動編)	May 26, 2005; 978-4-04-853809-1	March 26, 2013; 978-1-935654-87-2
2	Garma; Garuma-hen (ガルマ編)	June 26, 2006; 4-04-853963-9	June 25, 2013; 978-1-935654-88-9
3	Ramba Ral; Ranba Raru-hen (ランバ・ラル編)	May 26, 2007; 978-4-04-854094-0	December 17, 2013; 978-1-935654-97-1
4	Jaburo; Jaburō-hen (ジャブロー編)	June 26, 2008; 978-4-04-854195-4	December 17, 2013; 978-1-935654-98-8
5	Char & Sayla; Shaa Seira-hen (シャア・セイラ編)	June 26, 2009; 978-4-04-854339-2	March 25, 2014; 978-1-939130-19-8
6	To War; Kaisen-hen (開戦編)	July 26, 2010; 978-4-04-854502-0	June 17, 2014; 978-1-939130-20-4
7	Battle Of Loum; Ruumu-hen (ルウム編)	February 26, 2011; 978-4-04-854598-3	September 30, 2014; 978-1-939130-67-9
8	Operation Odessa; Odessa-hen (オデッサ編)	August 26, 2011; 978-4-04-854672-0	December 16, 2014; 978-1-939130-68-6
9	Lalah; Raraa-hen (ララァ編)	February 25, 2012; 978-4-04-120040-7	April 28, 2015; 978-1-941220-15-3
10	Solomon; Soromon-hen (ソロモン編)	June 26, 2012; 978-4-04-120275-3	June 23, 2015; 978-1-941220-16-0
11	A Cosmic Glow; Hikaru Uchū-hen (ひかる宇宙編)	September 26, 2012; 978-4-04-120394-1	September 17, 2015; 978-1-941220-46-7
12	Encounters; Meguriai Uchū-hen (めぐりあい宇宙編)	August 26, 2014; 978-4-04-101757-9	December 17, 2015; 978-1-941220-47-4

==== Deluxe Edition volume list ====
No.	English release date	English ISBN
1	August 12, 2025	978-1-64729-485-4
2	October 7, 2025	978-1-64729-486-1
3	December 9, 2025	978-1-64729-487-8
4	February 10, 2026	978-1-64729-552-3
5	April 14, 2026	978-1-64729-553-0
6	June 9, 2026	978-1-64729-554-7

==== Mobile Suit Gundam: The Origin MSD: Cucuruz Doan's Island volume list ====
No.	Original release date	Original ISBN	English release date	English ISBN
1	February 25, 2017	978-4-04-105343-0	October 1, 2024	978-1-64729-390-1
2	October 26, 2017	978-4-04-106296-8	December 3, 2024	978-1-64729-391-8
3	March 26, 2018	978-4-04-106700-0	February 4, 2025	978-1-64729-392-5
4	November 26, 2018	978-4-04-107500-5	April 1, 2025	978-1-64729-393-2
5	August 26, 2019	978-4-04-108469-4	June 3, 2025	978-1-64729-394-9

=== Anime ===
Sunrise announced in June 2011 that an anime adaptation of Gundam: The Origin was in production. In March 2014, it was announced it will be a four-episode OVA series with event screenings at Japanese theaters, in celebration of the 35th anniversary of Gundam, and centering on the stories of Casval Deikun and his sister Artesia. The first episode, titled The Blue-Eyed Casval (青い瞳のキャスバル, Aoi Hitomi no Kyasubaru), premiered in limited Japanese theaters on February 28, 2015. Sunrise produced an English dub recorded at NYAV Post for the first time since Bandai retired their Gundam license. Another two-episode OVA series, Mobile Suit Gundam: The Origin: Loum Arc, was released in 2017 and 2018.

A 13-episode anime television recompilation of the OVA series aired from April 29 to August 12, 2019, under the title Mobile Suit Gundam: The Origin: Advent of the Red Comet (機動戦士ガンダム THE ORIGIN 前夜 赤い彗星, Kidō Senshi Gundam: The Origin Zenya Akai Suisei). Sugizo produced the theme songs. His band Luna Sea performed the three opening themes, the first being "Sora no Uta ~Higher and Higher~" (宇宙(そら)の詩(うた) ～Higher and Higher～), the second "Hisōbi" (悲壮美), and the third a cover of TM Network's "Beyond the Time (Moebius no Sora wo Koete)" (BEYOND THE TIME（メビウスの宇宙を越えて）), the ending theme of 1988's Mobile Suit Gundam: Char's Counterattack. For the ending themes he decided to collaborate with female singers. The first ending theme is a cover of Daisuke Inoue's "Meguriai" (めぐりあい), the theme song of 1982's Mobile Suit Gundam III: Encounters in Space, by Sugizo feat. Glim Spanky. The second ending theme is a cover of Hiroko Moriguchi's "Mizu no Hoshi e Ai wo Komete" (水の星へ愛をこめて), the second opening theme song of 1985's Mobile Suit Zeta Gundam, by Sugizo feat. KOM_I (Wednesday Campanella). The third ending theme is the new song "A Red Ray" by Sugizo feat. miwa. The last is a cover of his and Morrie's co-composition "Hikari no Hate" (光の涯) by Sugizo feat. Aina the End (BiSH). The English dub for the Advent of the Red Comet TV recompilation series was broadcast in the United States on Adult Swim's Toonami programming block from July 7 to October 6, 2019. (Note: Adult Swim lists the series as premiering on July 6, 2019 at 3:00 a.m. ET/PT, which is effectively July 7.)

== See also ==
- Mobile Suit Gundam
- Mobile Suit Gundam Thunderbolt
- Mobile Suit Gundam: Cucuruz Doan's Island

Preceded by Gundam Build Fighters Try	Gundam metaseries (production order); 2015–2016	Succeeded by Mobile Suit Gundam: Iron-Blooded Orphans
Preceded by Mobile Suit Gundam: Twilight AXIS	Gundam metaseries (production order); 2017–2018	Succeeded by Gundam Build Fighters: GM's Counterattack
Preceded by none	Gundam Universal Century timeline U.C. 0068–0079	Succeeded by Mobile Suit Gundam MS IGLOO
