= Amuro =

Amuro may refer to:

== Fictional characters ==
- Amuro Ray, a space pilot in Mobile Suit Gundam
- Tōru Amuro, a detective in Detective Conan

== Other uses ==
- Namie Amuro (born 1977), Japanese entertainer
