= Mobile Suit Gundam =

Japanese anime television series

- Promotional poster
- 機動戦士ガンダム
- Genre: Real robot; Military science fiction; Space opera; Mecha
- Created by: Hajime Yatate; Yoshiyuki Tomino
- Directed by: Yoshiyuki Tomino (chief)
- Music by: Takeo Watanabe; Yūshi Matsuyama
- Opening theme: "Tobe! Gundam" by Koh Ikeda and Feeling Free
- Ending theme: "Eien ni Ammuro" by Koh Ikeda
- Country of origin: Japan
- Original language: Japanese
- No. of episodes: 43 (Note: Series creator and director Yoshiyuki Tomino requested that episode 15 be removed from later international releases, as he believed that the episode was not on par with the rest of the anime. As a result, there are only 42 episodes officially released in North America and other regions. Italy was the only region to officially release the episode outside Japan.) (list of episodes)

Production
- Producers: Nobuyuki Okuma (Nagoya TV); Yasuo Shibue (Sotsu Agency); Wataru Sekioka (Nippon Sunrise)
- Production companies: Nagoya TV; Sotsu Agency; Nippon Sunrise

Original release
- Network: ANN (Nagoya TV, TV Asahi)
- Release: April 7, 1979 – January 26, 1980

Related
Further information
Manga
Written by	Yū Okazaki
Published by	Akita Shoten
Magazine	Boken-Oh
Original run	May 1979 – February 1982
Volumes	2
Novel series
Written by	Yoshiyuki Tomino
Illustrated by	Yoshinobu Aobachi (1979 edition); Haruhiko Mikimoto (1987 edition)
Published by	Asahi Sonorama
English publisher	US: Del Rey Books (former) Stone Bridge Press
Imprint	Sonorama Bunko
Original run	November 1979 – March 1981
Volumes	3
Anime film series
Directed by	Yoshiyuki Tomino
Produced by	Masami Iwasaki; Masuo Ueda; Takayuki Yoshii
Written by	Yoshiyuki Tomino
Music by	Takeo Watanabe; Yūshi Matsuyama
Studio	Nippon Sunrise
Licensed by	NA: Sunrise
Released	March 14, 1981 – March 13, 1982
Runtime	139 minutes (The Movie); 133 minutes (II: Soldiers of Sorrow); 144 minutes (III: Encounters in Space)
Films	3
Manga
Mobile Suit Gundam 0079
Written by	Kazuhisa Kondo
Published by	MediaWorks
English publisher	US: Viz Media
Magazine	Cyber Comics; MS Saga; Dengeki Daioh
Original run	August 1992 – August 2005
Volumes	12
Novel series
Secret Rendezvous: Amuro and Lalah
Written by	Yoshiyuki Tomino
Illustrated by	Hirosuke Kizaki (1997 edition); Nocchi (2000 edition)
Published by	Kadokawa Shoten
Published	August 9, 1997
Volumes	2
Manga
Mobile Suit Gundam: Cucuruz Doan's Island: Doan and Rolland
Written by	Junji Oono
Published by	Kadokawa Shoten
Magazine	Gundam Ace
Published	June 24, 2022
Manga
Mobile Suit Gundam 0079 Episode Luna II
Written by	Kazuhisa Kondo
Published by	Kadokawa Shoten
Magazine	Gundam Ace
Original run	November 26, 2022 – January 26, 2024
Volumes	1
Related media
Mobile Suit Gundam: The Origin; Mobile Suit Gundam: Cucuruz Doan's Island
Video games
List of Mobile Suit Gundam video games

Mobile Suit Gundam (Japanese: 機動戦士ガンダム, Hepburn: Kidō Senshi Gandamu) is a Japanese anime television series produced by Nippon Sunrise. Co-created and directed by Yoshiyuki Tomino, it premiered in Japan on Nagoya Broadcasting Network and its affiliated ANN stations on April 7, 1979, airing 43 episodes until its cancellation on January 26, 1980. It was the first Gundam series, which has subsequently been adapted into numerous sequels and spin-offs. Set in the futuristic calendar year "Universal Century" 0079, the plot focuses on the war between the Principality of Zeon and the Earth Federation, with the latter unveiling a new giant robot known as the RX-78-2 Gundam, piloted by the 15 year old civilian Amuro Ray.

The character designs were done by Yoshikazu Yasuhiko, and Kunio Okawara was responsible for the robot designs, including the eponymous RX-78-2 Gundam. The first film was released on February 22, 1981. Tomino himself also wrote a trilogy of novels that retell the events of the series. Three manga adaptations of the series have also been produced.

Despite initial low ratings that caused the series' cancellation, the popularity of Gundam saw a boost from the introduction of Bandai's Gunpla models in 1980 from reruns and the release of a trilogy of compilation films. The series is considered notable for pioneering a depiction of mechs as mass-produced weapons of war.

== Plot ==
In the year Universal Century 0079, a cluster of Space Colonies calling itself the Principality of Zeon declares independence from the Earth Federation, and subsequently launches a war of independence known as the One Year War. Zeon, though smaller, has the tactical upper hand through their use of a new type of humanoid weapons called Mobile Suits. After half of all humanity perishes within the first week of the conflict, the war settles into a bitter eight-month stalemate.

The series begins with a newly deployed Federation warship, the White Base, arriving at the colony Side 7 to pick up a Federation prototype Mobile Suit. Unbeknownst to the Federation, a Zeon reconnaissance team was sent to gather information on this prototype. Disobeying orders, a Zeon soldier attacks the colony, killing most of the Federation crew and civilians in the process. Teenaged Amuro Ray discovers the Federation's prototype—the RX-78 Gundam. Despite his lack of experience, he is able to destroy the attacking Zaku II Mobile suits, but not without further damaging the colony. With their home colony damaged, the survivors have little choice but to join up with the White Base.

On their journey, the White Base members often encounter the Zeon Lieutenant Commander Char Aznable. Although not shy to fight the Federation, Char has a personal grudge towards Zeon's ruling Zabi family, and he takes advantage of his position to seek revenge. In one such case, he feeds Garma Zabi false information that gets him killed. Throughout the series, Char Aznable's backstory is slowly revealed. The name Char Aznable is merely an alias, his father was Zeon Zum Deikun, one of the original leaders of Zeon before the Zabi dynasty took over.

Char Aznable eventually meets up with a psychic named Lalah Sune. A love triangle between her, Char, and Amuro eventually forms. In a battle between Amuro and Char, Lalah is caught in Amuro's crossfire. When the Federation Forces invade the Fortress of A Baoa Qu to decisively defeat Zeon, Amuro engages on a final one-on-one duel against Char, with both blaming the other for Lalah's death. Having realized he forgot his true enemy, Char stops fighting to kill the last surviving Zabi member, Kycilia Zabi. Amuro then reunites with his comrades as the war reaches its end, leaving behind the Gundam as it was rendered inoperable after his battle.

== Release ==
=== Broadcast ===
In February 1980, Mobile Suit Gundam was aired in Italy, the first country to broadcast the show outside Japan. Mobile Suit Gundam was also later aired by the anime satellite television network, Animax, across Japan, with the series continuing to be aired on the network currently, and later its respective networks worldwide, including Hong Kong, Southeast Asia, South Asia, and other regions.

With the success of Gundam Wing on Toonami in 2000, Bandai Entertainment produced an English-dub of Mobile Suit Gundam, premiering on Cartoon Network's weekday after-school programming block on Monday, July 23, 2001. The series did not do as well as Gundam Wing. Due to 9/11, Gundam disappeared from the schedule. However, the series finale was shown as part of Toonami's "New Year's Eve-il" special on December 31, 2001. On Saturday, June 8, 2002, the series aired on their late-night Adult Swim block, starting over from the first episode, but it was again pulled before completing its run due to low ratings.

=== Home media ===
On May 30, 2006, Bandai Entertainment re-released the English dub of the TV series in a 10 volume DVD set. There was no Japanese audio track included, apparently because Yoshiyuki Tomino felt that the original mono mix was in too poor of a condition to use. However, in 2007 the original series was released on DVD in Japan, which sold over 100,000 copies within a month's time from December 21, 2007, to January 21, 2008.

At the 2010 New York Comic Con/New York Anime Festival, Bandai Entertainment announced that they would re-release Mobile Suit Gundam with both the original Japanese audio and the English dub. Bandai released it in two sets in the summer of 2011. The first set was released on September 13, 2011.

Following the closure in 2012 of Bandai Entertainment, the series went out of print. At their New York Comic Con 2014 panel, Sunrise announced their plans to re-release all of the Gundam series on home video in North America, starting with the original series. They would be distributed via Right Stuf Inc. They released the series on Blu-ray and DVD in October 2015.

On July 25, 2015, British anime distributor Anime Limited announced they would release Mobile Suit Gundam in cooperation with Sunrise for the first time in the UK on Blu-ray.

== Production ==
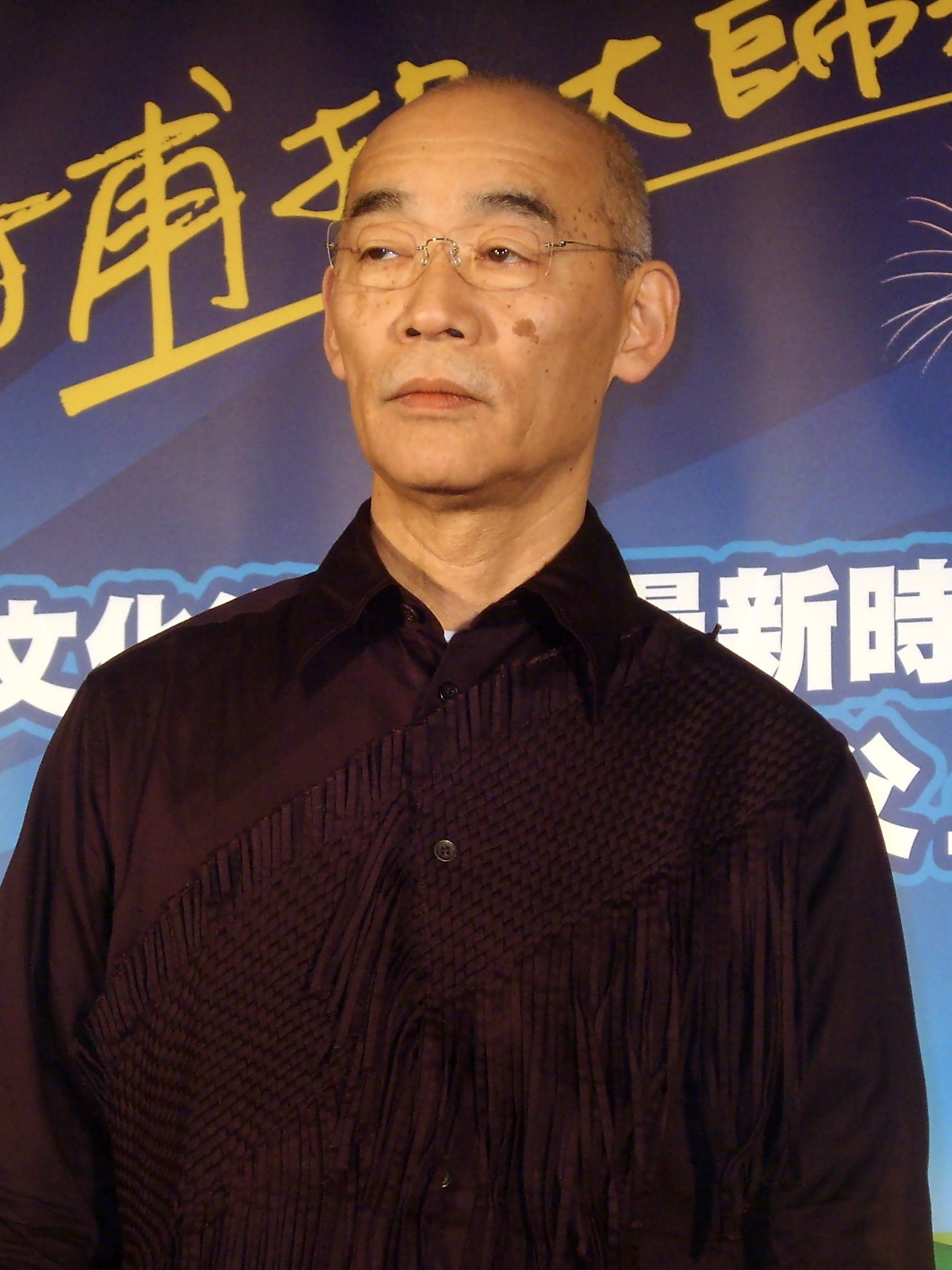
Director Yoshiyuki Tomino used the series to tell a story about war.

The "Mobile Suits" of the show were inspired by the powered armor from the novel Starship Troopers from 1959. Mobile suits were conceptualized as human-like robots which would not only appeal to children.

In previous series Tomino worked in, villains were alien agents. Mobile Suit Gundam was the first of his work which featured humans as antagonists. The director commented he wanted to tell a story about war. He aimed to expose through art the horrors of the Japanese wartime aggression in Manchuria in 1939. Tomino wanted to avoid historical revisionism and instead use the story to force viewers to confront the tragic realities of war. The director was originally unwilling to discuss the message of his work, expecting the viewers to reach their own conclusion. Additionally, he commented he "packed his frustrations" when making Gundam.

Tomino met mechanical designer Kunio Okawara when working on two television series from Sunrise. Tomino liked Okawara's work and asked him to collaborate with him in his upcoming project. Originally, the anime would be called "Gunboy" but it was renamed to Mobile Suit Gundam. The White Base, the mothership of the protagonist crew members, was designed with a three plane view method by Kunio Okawara, however, it was not specially designed for Gundam. It was actually a salvaged design from the anime Invincible Steel Man Daitarn 3. The idea of having a space carrier was partly inspired by the earlier science fiction anime Space Battleship Yamato, which Tomino claimed to be a fan of. It was intended to be in a more realistic black color, but was changed to white by the order of Sunrise, who similarly ordered the titular Gundam be changed from a grayish white to white, red, blue and yellow. Director Tomino showed great disgust in the color change, also noticing the unrealistic non-aerodynamic design of it after the show had aired, said in an interview that such design would never appear in the real world, since it would be a sitting duck from fighter aircraft. Tomino later stated in an interview in an April 1989 Newtype issue that the imaginary enemies of Gundam are Sunrise, sponsors and television stations.

Tomino has compared Mobile Suits with religious history in Japan, most notably the worship of Buddha statues located in temples. The relationship between the pilot and the mobile suit has also been compared with the way Formula One drivers use their machines. In order to give the Mobile Suits fast movements, most of the fights were situated in space where there was low gravity. This led to the creation of space colonies as a common setting. In order to explain how a person as young as Amuro could pilot the Gundam, the team came up with the idea of Newtypes.

== Media ==
=== Anime ===
==== Cucuruz Doan's Island ====
Within the 43 episodes of the original run, the episode "Cucuruz Doan's Island" stands out. Due to the director's request, the episode was never officially released in English. This episode was not used in the compilation films. In 2022 the film Mobile Suit Gundam: Cucuruz Doan's Island released as an adaptation of this episode.

=== Novels ===
In 1979, while the anime was airing, Yoshiyuki Tomino wrote the first novelizations of the original Gundam anime series. The novels, published as a trilogy, allowed him to depict his story in a more sophisticated, adult, and detailed fashion. This adaptation included several major changes to the story. For example, Amuro is already a member of the Federation military at the time of the initial Zeon attack on Side 7, and the main characters in the Federation serve on the White Base-class ships Pegasus and Pegasus II rather than the Pegasus-class White Base. The One Year War continues well into the year UC 0080 in the novels, whereas it concludes at the beginning of that year in the anime series. In the novel Amuro Ray is killed in the final attack against the Zeon stronghold of A Baoa Qu when his RX-78-3 is pierced through the torso by a Rick Dom's beam bazooka. This occurs as Char's unit attempts to warn him about Gihren's intention to destroy the fortress and take the Federation's offensive fleet along with it. Char and the crew of Pegasus II (White Base), along with handpicked men under Kycilia Zabi's command, make a deep penetrating attack against the Side 3 and together kill Gihren Zabi, after which Kycilia is killed by Char. Tomino later lamented that had he known that the anime's ending would be different and that another series would be made, he would not have killed off Amuro in the novels.

The three novels were translated into English by Frederik Schodt and published by Del Rey Books in September 1990. At the time, there were no officially recognized romanized names for certain words in the franchise. The original Japanese for many proper nouns were written in katakana, which gives a lot of leeway for localizing renditions. Many years later, when the Gundam series was finally licensed in North America, the rights holders came up with a unified list of "official spellings" for English-language material.

In 2004, Frederik Schodt revised his original translation of the books, which had been out of print for nearly a decade. What had been a three volume set in the 1990 Del Rey edition was re-released by Stone Bridge Press as one single volume of 476 pages with new cover art, titled Mobile Suit Gundam: Awakening, Escalation, Confrontation. Since the rights holders in Japan by this time had settled on official translated names, Schodt was able to update the translation to reflect the official terminology.

These novels influenced the 2025 Mobile Suit Gundam GQuuuuuuX series, co-writer Yoji Enokido and director Kazuya Tsurumaki stating that they made it feel natural to turn character Challia Bull into part of the main cast.

On August 9, 1997, Tomino released Secret Rendezvous, a novel duology centered around characters Amuro and Lalah.

A direct novelization by Masaaki Nakane was also released by Asahi Sonorama; it has almost the same plot as the TV series.

For its 15th anniversary, the Newtype magazine serialised For the Barrel, an adaptation of the series by Gichi Ohtsuka based on Tomino's novel trilogy.

=== Films ===
Following the success of the Mobile Suit Gundam TV series, in 1981 Tomino reworked the footage into three separate compilation films. The first two films, Mobile Suit Gundam I (also known as Mobile Suit Gundam The Movie) and Mobile Suit Gundam II: Soldiers of Sorrow, were released in 1981. The third film, Mobile Suit Gundam III: Encounters in Space, was released in 1982.

The trilogy of compilation films primarily reused footage from the television series, supplemented with new animation and revisions. Tomino removed several aspects of the show which he felt were too unrealistic for the show he intended Gundam to be, such as the Gundam Hammer (a large spiked ball on a chain). The G-Armor upgrade parts (used for transformations) were also completely removed and replaced in the narrative by the Core Booster support fighters, and Hayato receives a RX-77 Guncannon at Jaburo to replace the disadvantaged RX-75 Guntank. The third film also includes a substantial amount of new footage expanding on the battles of Solomon and A Baoa Qu.

The first Gundam film, upon release on February 22, 1981, drew a large crowd of 15,000 people at its premiere, leading to concerns from police and media that it could lead to social unrest from a riotous crowd. The event is considered a turning point in the history of anime, referred to as "the day that anime changed" according to Asahi Shimbun newspaper. The first film grossed ¥1.76 billion, and Gundam II grossed ¥1.38 billion. Encounters in Space was 1982's fourth highest-grossing Japanese film, with a distribution income of ¥1.29 billion and a total box office gross of ¥2.31 billion. Collectively, the trilogy grossed ¥5.45 billion at the Japanese box office.

In 1998, the three films were first released directly to VHS with English subtitles as part of Bandai's AnimeVillage releases, which makes them among the first Gundam works released in English. A year later, Bandai released an English dub of three compilation films in 1999. Featuring the voice of Michael Lindsay as Amuro Ray, and Steve Blum as Char Aznable. The dub pronounces the word Gundam as "Gun-dam", and the Principality of Zeon was called the "Duchy of Zeon". Sunrise prevented it from being re-released after its debut on VHS. The films were released again in North America on May 7, 2002, in DVD format, available separately or in a boxed set. These are also available only with re-done Japanese audio with English subtitles, the DVDs identical to the 20th anniversary release of the film compilation in Japan. The surviving original Japanese voice cast members rerecorded their lines. The 20th anniversary release was digitally remastered and many of the sound effects were replaced, most notably the futuristic gun sounds being replaced by louder machine gun sound effects. The music soundtrack was rearranged and in some cases tracks were removed from certain scenes. The vocal songs were rearranged also. For example, in the closing credits of the second and third films.

Bandai Visual has announced the re-release of the Mobile Suit Gundam films on DVD from new HD masters and with the original, theatrical, mono audio mix. This boxed set was released in Japan on December 21, 2007. On May 18, 2010, Bandai Entertainment re-released the 20th anniversary version of the trilogy under their Anime Legends label. As with the TV series, the films were re-released in North America under Sunrise themselves with distribution from Right Stuf Inc.

The films were distributed on DVD in the United Kingdom by Beez Entertainment in 2005 with a selection of subtitle tracks including English. Anime Ltd. has since acquired the UK license and has released a limited edition Blu-ray box set of the film trilogy (limited to 500 units) as an exclusive, sold only on their AllTheAnime.com store. It was released on March 27, 2017, in Japanese with English subtitles only.

An animated film titled Mobile Suit Gundam: Cucuruz Doan's Island (Japanese: 機動戦士ガンダム ククルス·ドアンの島, Hepburn: Kidō Senshi Gandamu Kukurusu Doan no Shima) was released on June 3, 2022, a remake of the "Cucuruz Doan's Island" episode which had previously never been released in English per Tomino's wishes. Although the film follows the same order of events as director Yoshikazu Yasuhiko's Mobile Suit Gundam: The Origin manga retelling of the show, he insisted on it being a remake of the episode and not titling it after The Origin.

=== Manga ===
There have been three manga series based on Mobile Suit Gundam. One, written by Yū Okazaki, was serialized in Akita Shoten's Boken-Oh magazine between May 1979 and February 1982 and compiled into two volumes. Another is Mobile Suit Gundam 0079 by Kazuhisa Kondo. It was published by MediaWorks from August 1992 to August 2005 in Cyber Comics and MS Saga anthologies and later in Dengeki Daioh magazine, and was collected in twelve tankōbon volumes. Viz Media published its first nine volumes in English between 2000 and 2003.

Mobile Suit Gundam: The Origin, the third of such manga, was written by anime character designer Yoshikazu Yasuhiko, character designer and animation director for the original television series. It was published from June 2001 to June 2011 in Kadokawa Shoten's Gundam Ace magazine and collected in a total of 24 tankōbon volumes. The series was first released in English by Viz Media but was dropped before it was completed; it was then released by Vertical from March 2013 to December 2015. The Origin features several sequences which elaborate on events prior to the original show. From 2015–2018, this backstory was adapted into a series of theatrical OVAs.

Besides adaptations, there is a parody yonkoma manga titled Mobile Suit Gundam-san, which was written and illustrated by Hideki Ohwada and serialized in Kadokawa Shoten's Gundam Ace magazine since 2001. This manga was adapted into an anime in 2014. Ohwada also created a spinoff manga, Gundam Sousei (ガンダム創世), which follows Yoshiyuki Tomino and the Sunrise staff as they work to make the television series and the compilation films. This series was serialized in Kadokawa Shoten's Gundam Ace magazine from 2009 to 2011 and compiled in the Gundam-san tankōbon starting in Volume 5. Kadokawa released two tankōbon volumes collecting Gundam Sousei chapters as The Men Who Created Gundam (「ガンダム」を創った男たち, "Gundam" wo Tsukutta Otoko-tachi). Denpa published The Men Who Created Gundam in English in June 2022 as an omnibus volume.

A one-shot manga written and illustrated by Junji Oono, Mobile Suit Gundam: Cucuruz Doan's Island: Doan and Rolland, was published on June 24, 2022, in the appendix to the August issue of Gundam Ace. It serves as a prequel to the "Cucuruz Doan's Island" episode of the series.

A continuation of the Mobile Suit Gundam 0079 manga, titled Mobile Suit Gundam 0079 Episode Luna II, was serialized in Gundam Ace from November 26, 2022, to January 26, 2024, and collected into one volume.

=== Video games ===
The success of the Gundam franchise lead to many different videogames. There are some which directly adapt the television series. One of the first to go in this direction was 1983's Gundam: Daichi ni Tatsu, an adventure game. More recent examples include Mobile Suit Gundam: Journey to Jaburo and its sequel Mobile Suit Gundam: Encounters in Space. Gundam 0079 The War for Earth loosely adapts the story of Gundam in the form of a live-action FMV game developed by Presto Studios, a non-Japanese company.

Some Gundam games such as Mobile Suit Gundam: Zeonic Front, Mobile Suit Gundam: Crossfire, Gundam Side Story 0079: Rise From the Ashes, are set during the events of the original series but focus on new protagonists and fronts of the conflict. Some of them may feature a Zeon perspective. These games may feature brief references to elements of the original show, such as Zeonic Front including a mission where you gather information on the White Base.

Giren's Greed is a series of strategy wargames. It allows you to recreate many Gundam scenarios, including ones in the One Year War. It also has the opportunity for player actions to create alternate outcomes for events.

There are also many Gundam games which operate in a much "looser" relationship to storytelling and continuity, sometimes even crossing over multiple series. The Gundam Battle Assault series of 2d fighting games features Mobile Suits from multiple eras at once. The Gundam Vs. series of 3D fighters features Mobile Suits from multiple timelines. Dynasty Warriors: Gundam attempts more of a story with its crossover.

Gundam has also made many appearances in crossover videogames. The Compati Hero franchise features a Super deformed style where Mobile Suits exist alongside Ultraman and Kamen Rider characters. The Super Robot Wars franchise of strategy RPGs also features Gundam, among other mecha franchises. Another Century's Episode is a crossover fighting game series which has some Gundam suits.

Games that have been unreleased in countries outside Japan include:

- Mobile Suit Gundam (1993 arcade game)
- Mobile Suit Gundam: Spirits of Zeon ~Dual Stars of Carnage~
- Mobile Suit Gundam: Spirit of Zeon ~Memory of Soldier~
- Quiz Mobile Suit Gundam: Monsenshi
- Mobile Suit Gundam: Lost War Chronicles
- Mobile Suit Gundam: Climax UC
- Mobile Suit Gundam: The One Year War
- Mobile Suit Gundam: Path of the Soldiers (also referred to as Ace Pilot)
- Gundam Battle (series)
- SD Gundam G Generation (series)
- SD Gundam: Scad Hammers
- Mobile Suit Gundam: Operation: Troy
- Mobile Suit Gundam: Bonds of the Battlefield
- Mobile Suit Gundam: Gundam vs. Gundam

== Reception, influence and legacy ==
Gundam was not popular when it first aired, and in fact came close to being canceled. The series was originally set to run for 52 episodes but was cut down to 39 by the show's sponsors, which included toymaker Clover. However, the staff was able to negotiate a one-month extension, ending the series with 43 episodes. When Bandai bought the rights to produce plastic models of Mobile Suits, considered a different market than Clover's Chogokin line of toys, things changed completely. With the introduction of Gunpla, the success of the show began to soar. The models sold very well, Bandai sponsored a rerun of the show, eventually leading to the theatrical release of three compilation movies. At the time, anime was dominated by the Super Robot genre. Gundam's take on the genre would retroactively be referred to as the "Real Robot" genre. The Anime ranked #2 on Wizard's Anime Magazine on their "Top 50 Anime released in North America". In TV Asahi's poll of the Top 100 Anime, Gundam came in 2nd. It is regarded as changing the concept of Japanese robot anime and the turning point of history in Japan.

The original Gundam series is still remembered and recognized within the anime fan community. The series revolutionized mecha anime, introducing the new Real Robot genre, and over the years became synonymous with the entire genre for many. As a result, for example, parodies of mecha genre commonly feature homages to Mobile Suit Gundam, thanks to its immediate recognizable status.

The series was the first winner of the Animage Anime Grand Prix prize, in 1979 and the first half of 1980. In the top 100 anime from Animage, Gundam was twenty-fourth. The magazine Wizard listed the series as the second best anime of all time. By the end of 2007, each episode of the original TV series averaged a sales figure of 80,928 copies, including all of the different formats it was published in (VHS, LD, DVD, etc.). The first DVD box set sold over 100,000 copies in the first month of release, from December 21, 2007, to January 21, 2008. As part of the 30th Anniversary of the Gundam series, the company officially announced a project on March 11, 2009, called Real-G, a plan to build a 1:1 real size scale Gundam in Japan. It was completed in July 2009 and displayed in a Tokyo park then taken down later. The 18-meter tall statue was reconstructed in Shizuoka Prefecture and was taken down in March 2011. In August 2011 it was dismantled only to reopen in Odaiba, Tokyo on April 19, 2012. It stood Odaiba along with a gift shop called "Gundam Front Tokyo" until it was dismantled in March 2016.

Most of the critical response to the series has been due to the setting and characters. John Oppliger observes that the characters of Amuro Ray, to whom the young Japanese of that time could easily relate, and Char Aznable, who was "simply ... fascinating", made a major contribution to the series' popularity. He also concludes that "in many respects First Gundam stands for the nostalgic identifying values of everything that anime itself represents". The series has been praised by Anime News Network for the way it portrays war, with Amuro facing many traumatic events. The series is also noted for having humans as an enemy faction. However, the animation has been noted to have notoriously aged when compared with series seen in the 2000s.

Mecha anime creator Shoji Kawamori attended Keio University in the same years as Macross screenwriter Hiroshi Ōnogi and character designer Haruhiko Mikimoto, where they had a Mobile Suit Gundam fan club called "Gunsight One", a name they would use years later as the call sign of the bridge of the SDF-1 spaceship from their first Macross anime television series. In fact, The Super Dimension Fortress Macross mecha anime series was inspired by Gundam in several aspects during its early development. Guillermo del Toro has cited the series as an influence on Pacific Rim.

American musician Richie Kotzen, former guitarist from Poison and Mr. Big, released an album called Ai Senshi ZxR in 2006 in Japan. The album consisted of covered music from the Gundam series and original songs. American musician Andrew W.K. released an album called Gundam Rock on September 9, 2009, in Japan. The album consists of covered music from the Gundam series to celebrate its 30th anniversary.

=== Rides ===
"Gundam the Ride: A Baoa Qu" was an amusement park attraction at the Fuji-Q Highland Amusement Park located in Fujiyoshida, Yamanashi, Japan. It was a dark ride for the park. Gundam the Ride opened to the public on July 20, 2000. Set during the final chaotic Battle of A Baoa Qu, Gundam the Ride places its riders in an Escape Launch Shuttle about to leave the battleship Suruga.

The animation of Gundam the Ride used mostly computer graphics, however, all human characters were hand-drawn cel animation. All of the character designs for Gundam the Ride were done by Haruhiko Mikimoto. The ride's characters make a cameo appearance in the video game "Encounters in Space" while the player (playing as Amuro Ray in his Gundam) is making his way through the Dolos.

The ride closed on January 8, 2007, and replaced with "Gundam Crisis" The attraction's main feature is a full size 1:1 Gundam model, lying flat inside the venue. Instead of sitting in a movable cockpit and watching a movie, it involves participants carrying handheld devices throughout to find certain pieces of information, similar to a scavenger hunt, in order to activate the Gundam. The interior of the attraction is a mock-up of a Federation ship, and staff act as crew members.

== See also ==
- Gundam
- Gundam (fictional robot)
- Mobile Suit Gundam: The Origin – a manga interpretation of the original anime which adds additional backstory
- Mobile Suit Gundam: War in the Pocket – the first side story of the first Gundam anime, set in December of U.C 0079, released in 1989
- Mobile Suit Gundam: The 08th MS Team – a second side story of the first Gundam anime, set in U.C 0079 during "One Year War" after the death of Garma Zabi, released from 1996 to 1999
- Mobile Suit Gundam MS IGLOO – a third side story of the first Gundam anime, serving as a prologue of the One Year War, released from 2004 to 2009
- Mobile Suit Gundam 0083: Stardust Memory – a sequel of the first Gundam anime, set after "One Year War", released from 1991 to 1992
- Mobile Suit Gundam-san – a parody gag manga
- Mobile Suit Gundam: Cucuruz Doan's Island – a movie remake of the 15th episode of the series

== Notes ==
Preceded by none	Gundam metaseries (production order); 1979–1980	Succeeded by Mobile Suit Zeta Gundam
Preceded by Mobile Suit Gundam MS IGLOO	Gundam Universal Century timeline U.C. 0079–0080	Succeeded by Mobile Suit Gundam: The 08th MS Team; Mobile Suit Gundam: Requiem for Vengeance; Mobile Suit Gundam Thunderbolt; Mobile Suit Gundam 0080: War in the Pocket
