= Amuro Ray =

Fictional character from Mobile Suit Gundam

- Mobile Suit Gundam character
- Mobile Suit Gundam illustration featuring Amuro Ray
- First appearance: Mobile Suit Gundam Episode 1: "Gundam Rising" (1979)
- Created by: Yoshiyuki Tomino
- Voiced by: Japanese: Tōru Furuya; Yumi Tōma (Mobile Suit SD Gundam) (Young); Tsubasa Yonaga (Gundam-san); English: Brad Swaile (MSG and CC); Michael Lindsay (MSG I-III); Matthew Erickson (Zeta); Fryda Wolff (Origin) (Young); Lucien Dodge (Origin, Cucuruz Doan's Island, GQuuuuuuX)

In-universe information
- Family: Tem Ray (father); Kamaria Ray (mother)
- Significant others: Sayla Mass (girlfriend, [MSG novelization]); Beltorchika Irma (girlfriend, [MSG-Z]); Chan Agi (girlfriend, [MSG-CC])
- Nationality: Earth Federation
- Birthplace: Prince Rupert, British Columbia
- Allegiance: Earth Federation Forces [MSG]; Karaba, Anti Earth Union Group [MSG-Z]/[MSG-ZZ]; Earth Federation Forces (Londo Bell) [MSG-CC]

Amuro Ray (Japanese: アムロ・レイ, Hepburn: Amuro Rei) is a fictional character and the main protagonist of Sunrise's 1979 anime series Mobile Suit Gundam. As the first protagonist in the franchise, Amuro is a mechanic who becomes the pilot of the mecha known as RX-78-2 Gundam to protect himself from the Zeon forces invading his space colony during the war. He becomes an Earth Federation pilot in the war as well as the first Newtype, a type of human with special awareness which gives him great skills when fighting. The Gundam franchise explores Amuro's involvement in the wars piloting the titular mecha. He returns in the sequel, Mobile Suit Zeta Gundam as an older retired soldier afraid of his past, and the 1988 feature film Mobile Suit Gundam: Char's Counterattack where he takes part in new conflict against his rival Char Aznable. The character was present in several adaptations related to Gundam as well as video games.

Amuro was created by director and writer Yoshiyuki Tomino as a teenager meant to appeal to the young demography of Mobile Suit Gundam with a supernatural trait known as Newtype, meant to make him stronger in fights to balance his characterization. He was often written as a common man meant to contrast Char's popularity. He is voiced by Tōru Furuya in Japanese while several actors provided their talent for the English adaptations of several Gundam works including Amuro.

Amuro's character became very popular in Japan, earning high ranks in popularity polls involving Gundam characters as well as anime characters in general. Critical reception to the character has also been positive with comments revolving around his work as a soldier which contrasted super robot heroes and instead came across as a more realistic teenager getting used to the war.

== Appearances ==
=== Mobile Suit Gundam ===
Amuro's first appearance is in the television series Mobile Suit Gundam. Amuro is a talented amateur mechanic, who spends a lot of time in building different mechanical parts with little social interactions with other people, and as a hobby designed the basketball-sized talking robot Haro. He is the son of Tem Ray, the project leader for the Earth Federation's Project V, which produces the prototype mobile suits Gundam, among other mechas to combat the Principality of Zeon's Zaku. When Char Aznable sends a group of Zeon mobile suits in a reconnaissance mission on Side 7, one of the new recruits from the squad decides to attack the colony. In sheer desperation, Amuro ends up piloting the RX-78-2 Gundam to defend his home.

Using his intuition and reading the manual, Amuro manages to start up the Gundam and defeat the two attacking Zaku mobile suits. Seeing his potential, Earth Federation Captain Bright Noa assigns the reluctant Amuro to the Gundam and repeatedly sends the boy out against Zeon forces. It is in Earth orbit that Amuro first goes into personal battle against Char. Still being a novice, Amuro fares poorly, but still manages to fend off Char's attack. When White Base finally lands on Earth, Amuro deserts the ship after overhearing Bright discussing with Mirai Yashima about replacing Amuro from piloting the Gundam. Amuro abandons the crew with the Gundam, but after finding out about Zeon Ramba Ral's attempted attack on White Base, he rushes back to his friends and helps resolve the situation. During the Operation Odessa, the death of Matilda Ajan causes him to realize he is not the only one affected by the war. Across his battles, Amuro gets his own nickname during the One Year War: the "White Devil" (白い悪魔, Shiroi Akuma).

Across the war, Amuro first meets the Newtype girl Lalah Sune on the lakeside of Side 6, and immediately developed a bonding. Amuro and Char Aznable faced off several times during the course of the One Year War. He sensed Lalah's Newtype ability when fighting Char's Gelgoog in Side 5's Texas Colony. Their encounter ends tragically when Amuro accidentally kills Lalah when she blocks Amuro's critical strike towards Char with her MAN-08 Elmeth mobile armor. Amuro and Char's feelings resulting from this culminate in the battle of A Baoa Qu where Amuro and Char destroy each other's mobile suit through fierce fighting, and then continued fighting with side arms and eventually a sword duel. Char eventually stops fighting and Amuro reunites with his crew members.

=== Mobile Suit Zeta Gundam ===
In the sequel Mobile Suit Zeta Gundam, Amuro is placed under house arrest shortly after the war due to the government's mistrust of Newtypes. While he lives in a luxurious mansion and is officially free to come and go as he pleases, Amuro's house servants are actually government agents assigned to keep track of his movements. Amuro works as a trainer/adviser in the Cheyenne Mobile Suit Academy up until the time of the Gryps Conflict. He suffers from chronic combat fatigue and is afraid of going to space and facing Lalah's spirit.

During the Gryps Conflict, a pregnant Fraw Bow, with her three adopted children, come to visit Amuro. They manage to re-ignite Amuro's fighting spirit and help him escape from his government handlers. After joining the Karaba (AEUG's earth-bound ally), Amuro becomes a key figure within the group, leading several crucial missions, including the attack on the Titans' base in Mount Kilimanjaro and the seizing of Federation's Congress Building in Dakar. He later goes to space to fight the Neo Zeon. After the first Neo Zeon movement, Amuro joins the Earth Federation's Londo Bell group led by Bright Noa, and serves as the combat squad commander.

=== Mobile Suit Gundam: Char's Counterattack ===
During the second Neo-Zeon movement depicted in the 1988 film Mobile Suit Gundam: Char's Counterattack, Amuro is assigned to the battleship Ra Cailum, Londo Bell's flagship, as the leader of the ship's mobile suit squads. Amuro initially pilots the RGZ-91 Re-GZ, but despite managing to hold his fight against the funnel-equipped Char and Gyunei altogether, Amuro is unable to stop Neo-Zeon dropping Luna V on the Federation's Lhasa headquarters. Traveling to the Moon, Anaheim Electronics soon delivers to him the RX-93 Nu Gundam, a highly advanced mobile suit largely designed by Amuro himself. At Battle of Axis, after defeating Char's MSN-04 Sazabi in the duel and capturing Char's escape pod, Amuro attempts to single-handedly stop the asteroid from colliding with Earth by pushing it with his Nu Gundam. His action inspires other mobile suits to join in, even Neo-Zeon soldiers. Although he eventually succeeds, the act overloads Nu Gundam's psychoframe construct, killing him along with Char. The fates of either character were never revealed in the film, though the novelization of Char's Counterattack confirms both as KIA. The follow-up Gundam Unicorn also supports this idea. However, the official Universal Century timeline for the animated series lists him and Char as MIA.

=== Mobile Suit Gundam Unicorn ===
Amuro appears in cameo-form in Mobile Suit Gundam Unicorn, in the form of a photo portrait on the wall of the Captain Bright Noa's office on board his vessel. In the final OVA for Mobile Suit Gundam Unicorn, the voice of Amuro can be heard as he speaks to Char as they depart along with Lalah Sune's spirit from the now dead body of Full Frontal. Although Amuro makes no other appearance in Mobile Suit Gundam Unicorn, he is referenced by several of its characters.

=== Mobile Suit Gundam GQuuuuuuX ===
In a branching timeline from the original Mobile Suit Gundam series' continuity, due to Gene's inability to sortie for his mission, Char participates in the Side-7 Gundam-jack mission, and successfully steals the RX-78-2 Gundam developed by the Earth Federation and becomes its pilot instead of Amuro, renaming it the "Red Gundam" based on his preferences. This event changes the outcome of the One Year War between the Federation and the Principality of Zeon, culminating with Zeon's victory. Although this timeline's Amuro never made an appearance or revealed his status, he was mentioned several times though this timeline's Lalah under the White Devil moniker as he was responsible for Char's death in several timelines.

Later in the finale during Amate Yuzuriha's showdown with Shuji Ito in Amuro's old mobile suit, the voice of Amuro can be heard once again through the GquuuuuuX as he declares the Gundam's intention to not harm Lalah ever again, implying that the Zeknova's phenomenon has allowed Amuro's will from the prime timeline to implant himself on the GquuuuuuX and assists Machu by further increasing the Omega Psycommu's output on her suit. Amuro's spirit can also be seen as he assists Machu on her final blow against Shuji. Later in the aftermath, due to the GquuuuuuX's one-of-a-kind design to create Zeknova phenomena independent of the Red Gundam using OOPARTs from the other side, Amuro's soul is still seemingly latched to the GquuuuuuX, as he declares that Machu and Nyaan will reunite with Shuji one day.

=== Other appearances ===
In Yoshiyuki Tomino's novelization of Mobile Suit Gundam, Amuro is already a member from the Federation in the start. In this version Amuro is killed in the final attack against the Zeonic stronghold of A Baoa Qu when his RX-78-3 is pierced through the torso by a Rick Dom's beam bazooka. However, after his death, Amuro's consciousness communicates with Char's sister, Sayla Mass, and tells her she is not alone. The first version of Char's Counterattack, High Streamer, follows Amuro's actions in his final fight against Char which were later adapted in the film. Tomino also wrote another novel titled Beltorchika's Children that had Amuro as a family man and reported as killed in action in the ending. An animated film adaptation based on the "Cucuruz Doan's Island" episode Mobile Suit Gundam: Cucuruz Doan's Island (2022) recreates one of Amuro's early stories from the first television series.

Another episode of Gundam Evolve retcons an event from Char's Counterattack where Amuro confronts Char's underling Quess Paraya convincing her to stop fighting. He then convinces her to fly towards Hathaway Noa to save Hathaway. Amuro also appears in the manga Mobile Suit Vs. Giant God of Legend: Gigantis' Counterattack where he joins forces with Char and Judau Ashta to stop the Neo Zeon from using the massive Gigantis to cause destruction. He is also the protagonist of the manga series Mobile Suit Gundam: The Origin which retells the events of the first Gundam TV series with the original video animation showing his childhood. The character is also parodied in the comedy Mobile Suit Gundam-san.

Amuro is also a recurring character in the Gundam video games. He is present in the Gundam crossovers series including Gundam: Battle Assault, Gundam vs., Dynasty Warriors: Gundam and SD Gundam. He also appears in mecha crossover series including Super Robot Wars and Another Century's Episode.

== Creation ==
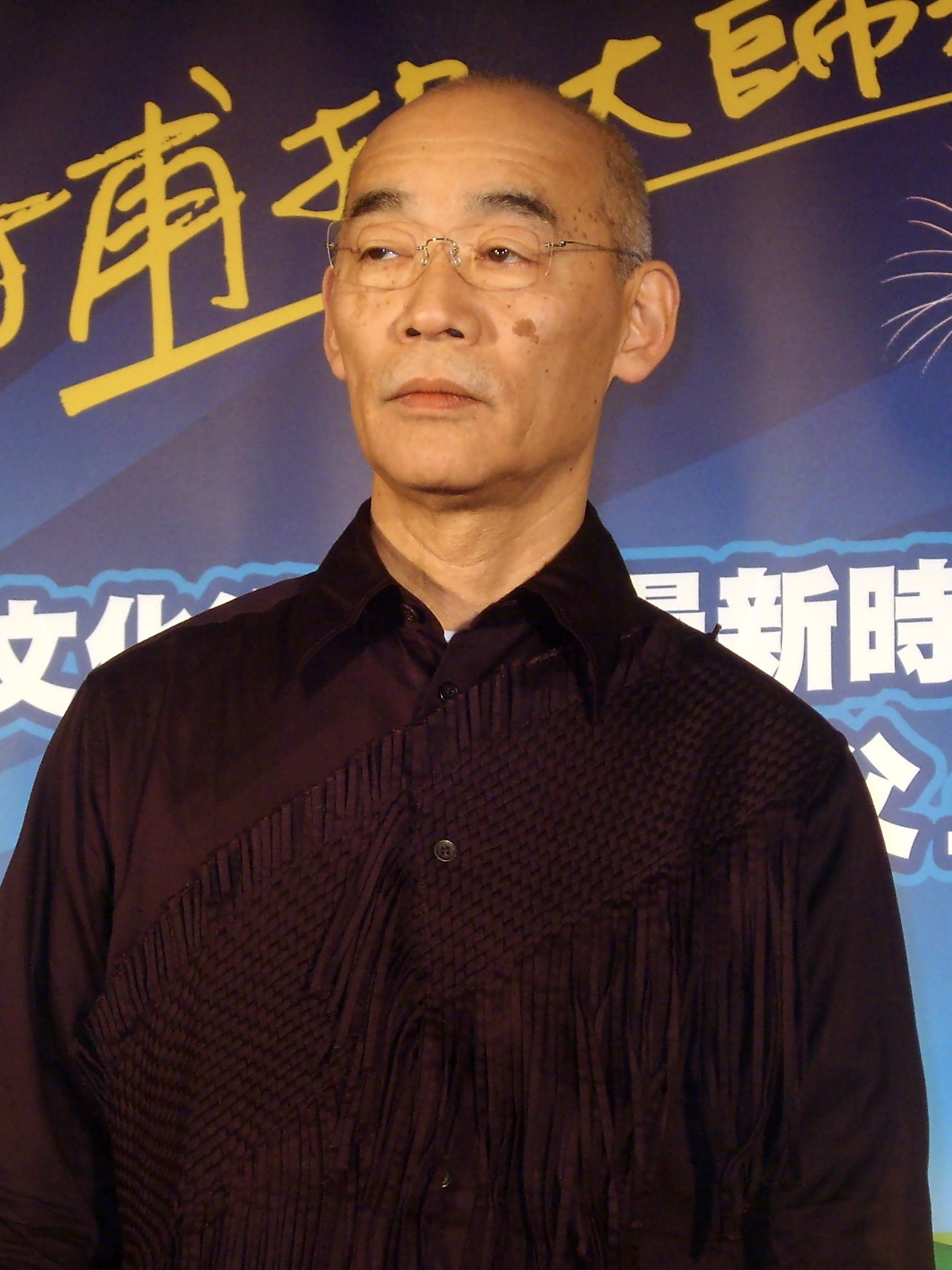
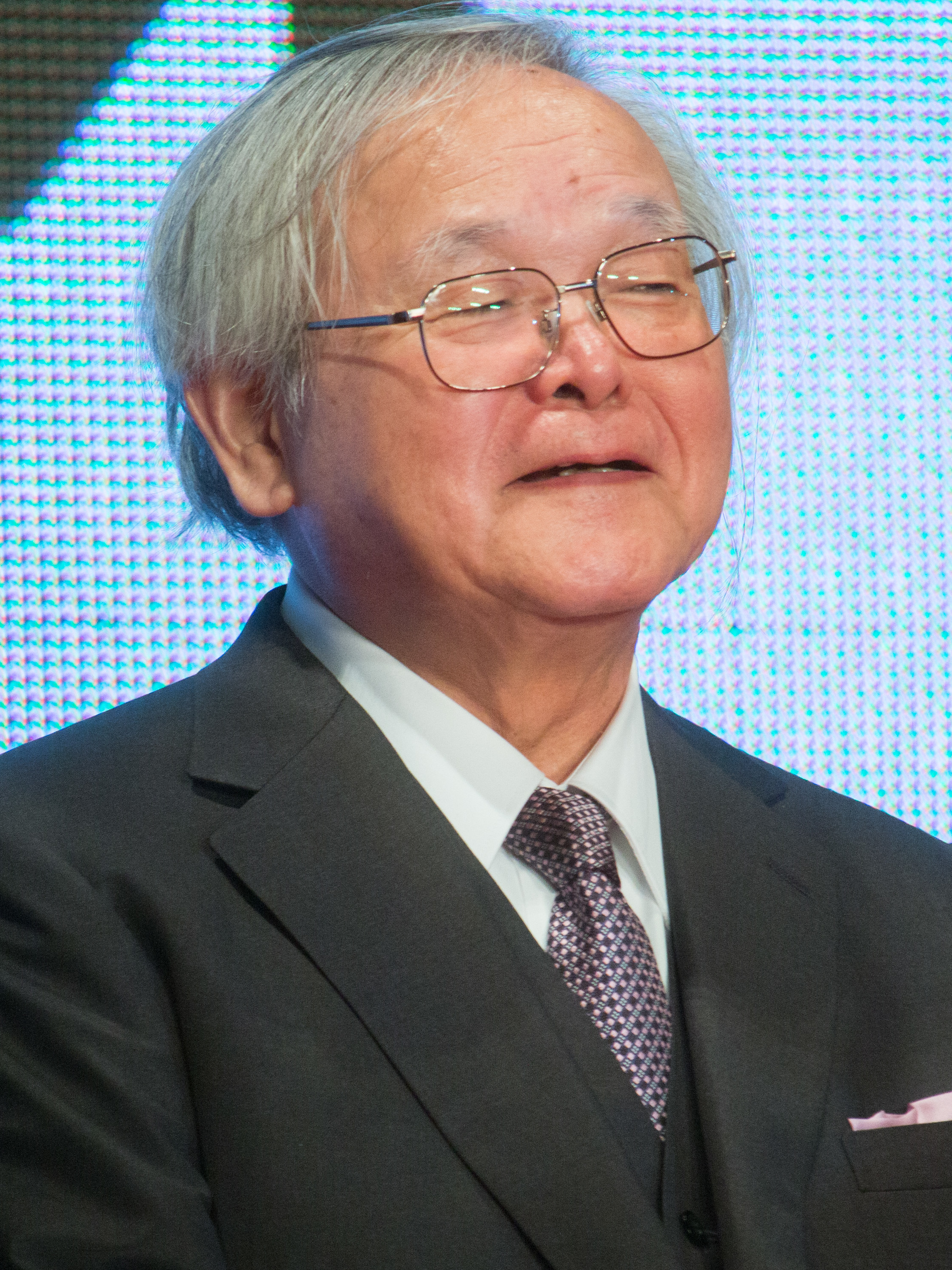
Yoshiyuki Tomino created Amuro, while Yasuhiko Yoshikazu designed him.

Yoshiyuki Tomino originally created "Freedom Fighter", which was a project proposal for Mobile Suit Gundam, was planned as a space version of "Jugo Shonen Houryuuki". According to Masao Iizuka of the Japan Sunrise Planning Office Desk, who drafted the plan, Briand's younger brother was not interesting in setting the main character because Briand, who is the leader of the same work, and Doniphan (Donovan), who is a rival, lacked interest in models. Jack, who temporarily becomes introverted, and that became the prototype of Amuro. At that time, computers were just beginning to become commonplace, and he thought that such a high-tech child would be able to do many things, so he chose a slightly introverted boy as the main character. "Hongo Higashi (Azuma)" in the initial draft drawn by Yasuhiko. The name Amuro Ray was invented by general director Yoshiyuki Tomino over the course of a month Later, in Tomino's "Mobile Suit Gundam Setting Book / Original Draft", it was written as "Amuro Rei". Yasuhiko drew the idea of "let's make it a red curly hair and make it a carrot-like character". Also, in Yoshikazu Yasuhiko's image, Amuro was "foreigner" with red hair and blue eyes, but due to compromises, he is said to be a "Nisei" with brown hair and dark eyes.

Early concept artwork of Amuro Ray during the time he was called Hongo

Tomino gave the Gundam main character the name Amuro believing such word did not exist. However, three months after the show aired, Tomino received a letter from Sunrise informing him there was an island named Amuro in Okinawa. Amuro was introduced as an ordinary man in contrast to his rival Char Aznable. As a result, he found Amuro hard to write as he was meant to oppose Char whom Tomino found more interesting. In one scene of an early episode, Amuro is slapped by Bright as a method of correction. Tomino considered this scene vital as he found this type of violence needed for a young person to mature most notably due to the way Amuro was misbehaving. Shin Sasaki from Sunrise considers the final scene from the Mobile Suit Gundam film trilogy where Amuro returns to White Base as one of the most memorable ones from the entire franchise. Meanwhile, Amuro has a close relationship with Fraw Bow ever since childhood and remain friendly in the White Base. Yasuhiko had problems with Tomino's commentary about how these two characters do not end in a relationship. Instead, there is no further appeal between their relationship in Zeta Gundam where Amuro instead becomes more attracted to Sayla Mass, possibly due to her being his type of woman according to the staff. Amuro was announced by Tomino as a new type of being as reflected in how society needs this new type of human being. Tomino considered Amuro "kind of simple for the potential that human beings can reach in the future." Yasuhiko stated that Amuro's misrelationship with the members of the crew of the White Base and his mother were outstanding by the time the series premiered in contrast to previous conventional heroes who would make up with each other.

Originally, Tomino did not want to include Amuro in Mobile Suit Zeta Gundam and when trying to kill him, he failed to do it. As a result, he decided to put Amuro on a friendly relationship with Char. The relationship the two rivals have in Zeta Gundam due to proper understanding between the two soldiers. In regards to Char's Counterattack, Tomino created the movie to end Amuro and Char's rivalry. While the story was written to primarily centered around Char's hypocristic ideal, Amuro would oppose them. Nevertheless, Char provides Amuro with weaponry to support his Mobile Suit so that both would fight on equal terms. The intense exchanges between both of them are compared with Tomino's own feeling of being tired after working on several series. Tomino believes Amuro's popularity in the film can be due to how the audience could easily empathize with the protagonist's problems. Kawai personally wanted the film to properly depict Amuro's mecha RX-78-02 Gundam in the same fashion as the original television series from 1978.

Original plans for Char's Counterattack would involve Amuro becoming married which bothered the producers. Still, to Tomino, it seemed like the most critical opinion in planning the movie production, and he adopted it as a critical point. Tomino expressed that since Gundam was still the mecha genre, he could not make Amuro become somebody's possession that leads to a normal life. Tomino believes je have not forgotten this principle regarding combat. As for the characters, the world of Gundam is a story of evolving humans, which inevitably leads to the "denial of things" and "denial of machines." This is what is meant by the "denial of Amuro's marriage."

=== Casting ===
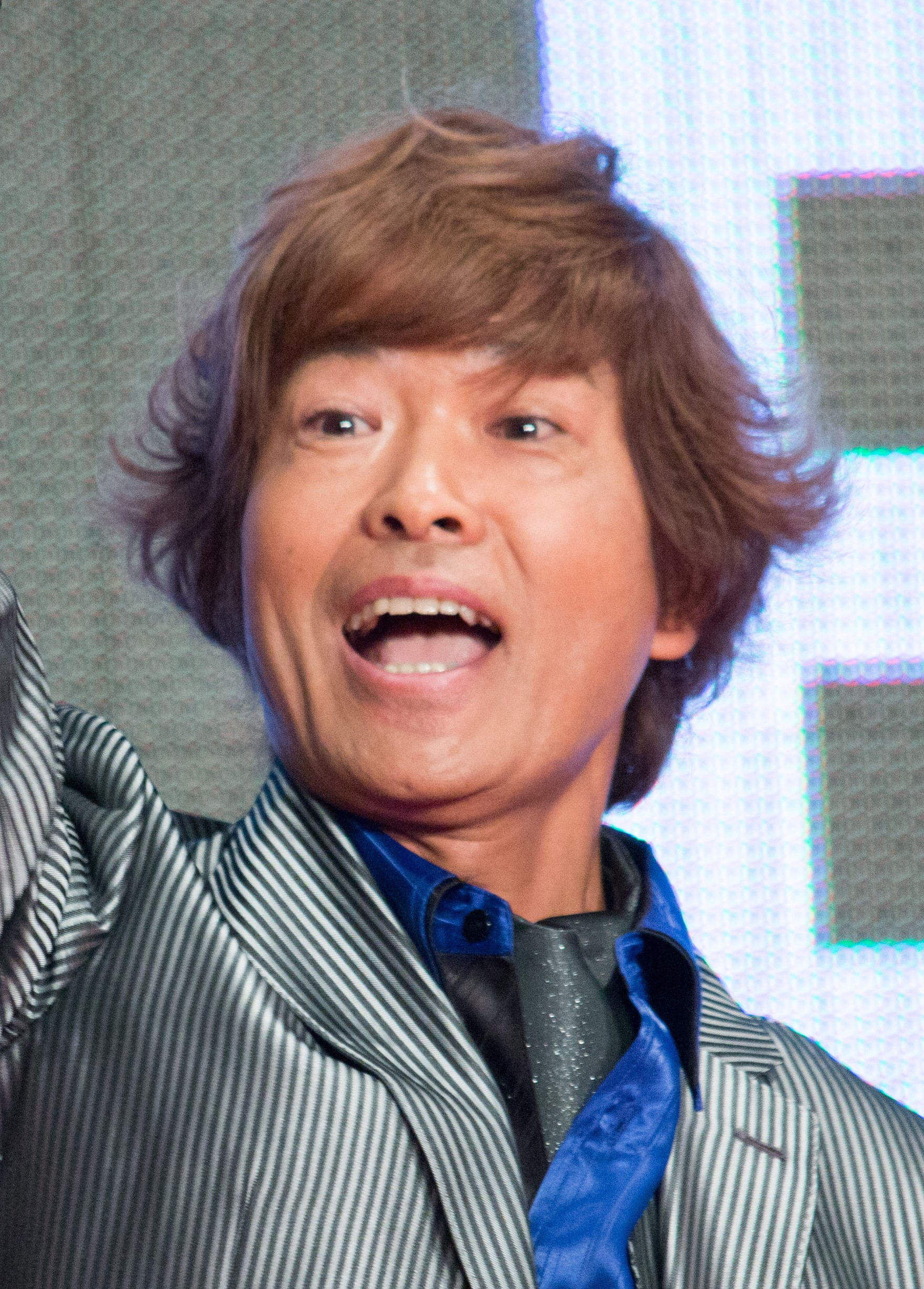
Tohru Furuya provided Amuro's Japanese voice.

He is voiced by Tōru Furuya in Japanese. Toru Furuya also liked the scene where Amuro contacts his friends using his Newtype powers. Although Amuro was not his favorite character in his career, Furuya had fun in his work as during recordings of the series, he befriended Char's voice Actor, Shuichi Ikeda. However, he was not close to Tomino. By Char's Conterattack, Furuya was close to his own age (35 years old) at the time of recording (29 years old), so he tried to act like an adult with a sense of responsibility. Since Amuro had not yet appeared, it was unclear how his mental state in Zeta Gundam led to his resurrection in this work. It is said that until the recording of the scene involving Agi, he was dragging the youthful part of Zeta Gundam. Furuya talks about Beltorchika Irma, Amuro's partner who ended up not appearing, and although she was a necessary existence for Amuro in the days of Zeta Gundam, she is not an ideal partner, but rather Chan Agi is Amuro's ideal. In a later interview, he said that he interpreted it as a close existence, and that such feelings subconsciously appeared in the play.

For Mobile Suit Gundam: Cucuruz Doan's Island (2022), Furuya found his work nostalgic and stated that the film made emphasis of how clashing was the relationship between Amuro and his superior, Captain Bright Noa. Furuya elaborated that Yasuhiko's idea was making the movie realistic with Amuro acting more mature in relationship with the children. Another theme of the film was how the youth's lives are being ruined by the plot of the One Year War story from the original television series. Further commentary, Furuya was glad with the popularity he achieved by voicing Amuro for over 40 years. He said that while Amuro also had popularity, he could not surpass his rival, Char, a common trait he sometimes find common in anime where there are rivalries. He further stated that "nowadays you can see the encouragement through SNS, I like how a lot of followers appear in Twitter, and I'm very surprised at his popularity".

Multiple English actors provided Amuro's voice. Brad Swaile voiced him in the original TV series, Char's Counterattack, and the majority of the licensed Gundam video games. Michael Lindsay dubbed him in the three movie compilations, Matthew Erickson in Zeta Gundam and the Mobile Suit Gundam: Gundam vs. Zeta Gundam video game. Meanwhile, for Origin Fryda Wolff provided the voice of a young Amuro while Lucien Dodge portrayed the older one.

== Reception ==
=== Critical response ===
Amuro Ray's character has been well received by publications for anime and other media. John Oppliger from AnimeNation observes that the character of Amuro, to whom the young Japanese of that time could easily relate, made a major contribution to the series' popularity. While his character was early seen in the TV series as depressive and stoic, writers from Anime News Network noted how Amuro was developed in the series into a soldier as he faces the pressure of having enemies and the consequences of killing others. Additionally, J. Doyle Wallis from DVD Talk saw Amuro became more matured in the series' finale despite going through one stressing situation. However, Amuro has often been noted to be less popular than his rival Char Aznable.

His appearances in Zeta Gundam were also praised by Mania Entertainment's Chris Beveridge for adding more material from the first Gundam series and for the change in several of his relationships most notably with Char from enemy to a friendly ally.

Allen Divers from Anime News Network found Amuro and Char's final duel the most important part from Char's Counterattack, the lack of resolution of their rivalry made the film unfulfilling. In reviewing the same film, THEM Anime Reviews' Carlo Ross saw that while Amuro was overshadowed by Char, he is still an "earnest, well-meaning, and heroic character in his own right." On the other hand, J. Doyle Wallis criticized their rivalry in the film considering it a "rehash" of the events of the television series.

Anime News Network praised the movie for the focus on Amuro's character arc and modern themes without removing the original aspects of the franchise. The Japan Times commented that every viewer would be concerned by Amuro's safety due to how the main plot has him surviving the encounter from the original TV series but still felt returning fans would enjoy the story and how the disciplinary actions performed in White Base are contested.

=== Analysis ===
University of Oregon writer John D. Moore argues that Gundam foregrounds the interiority of Amuro, challenging conventions governing the young protagonist. Moore in Gundam's narrative strategies a sophisticated set of techniques employed to portray Amuro's inner life. This foregrounding of Amuro's interiority critically intervenes in the traditions of its genre and even the industrial structures that make the genre possible. The character was compared to shōnen manga-like protagonists as Amuro is the character whose interiority Gundam's narrative is most interested in representing in contrast to previous robot series from the 1970s where the main characters where more active fighters. Hideaki Anno, a fellow staff member who worked with Tomino several times, describes the Amuro from Zeta Gundam as a man who is ashamed of his actions in the first series and both he and Char see themselves in the new protagonist, Kamille Bidan, to the point the plot of the series came across as repetitive. Tomino responded to Anno that he aimed to give Amuro's and Char's characterization in Zeta Gundam ambiguous but stated that Kamille is too different from them to the point of labeling the new lead as autistic as a result of his heavy burden. When Kamille's first love is introduced, Tomino noted that they became more similar.

Amuro's rivalry with Char and their subsequent final battle in the television series, the titular mobile suit stops a fatal laser beam from killing Amuro and is reduced to slag before his eyes. This final fight destroys Char's mobile suit as well, enabling Amuro to resume battling his rival. Amuro's ability to stand fight; and ultimately, choose not to fight, is a result of his liberation from his Gundam mobile suit; which is in turn a product of the series' focus on characters over the mecha themselves. In conclusion, according to Aaron J. Kane from University of Vermont, Tomino managed to create a realistic series by prioritizing on Amuro and Char rather than focus more on the robots like his previous works. The Netwtype powers Amuro shows across the television series were also seen as a metaphor for the protagonist's coming-of-age ceremony as there are several episodes where Amuro starts showing signs in regards of sexuality when being attracted by Lieutenant Matilda Ajan.

While initially describing Amuro as a relatable character to general view of otaku, Journal of Anime and Manga Studies said the one from Char's Counterattack instead comes across as a war hero while still being popular. In Char's Counterattack, it is not until Amuro re engineers the RX-93 with the psycho frame system that he is able to battle Char on equal footing. This handling of Gundams was compared to that of Formula 1 drivers and their own race cars, a connection that still holds for the film. The macro-action of Char's Counterattack briefly pauses whenever pilots are forced to dock mid-battle in order to attend to repairs and refueling. Such specific attention to the details of the mobile suits in the movie simultaneously be re-created in the model kits that would be released after the film's debut. As one of the final installments from the Universal Century timeline created by Tomino, the impact of the narrative would result in several anime writers creating new characters that would attempt to recreate Amuro's legacy alongside fans.

=== Popularity ===
Amuro has been popular, having been voted as the fourth most popular male character from the 1980s by Newtype readers. He was ranked second in Mania Entertainment's 10 Most Iconic Anime Heroes written by Thomas Zoth who commented that he "was the first teenage pilot with moral qualms about the war he was fighting. His arrogance, capriciousness and self-doubt paved the way for the isolated, troubled characters of Neon Genesis Evangelion." In the first two Animage Readers' Poll, Anime Grand Prix, from 1979 and 1980 Amuro was voted as the second most popular character in anime and was beaten by Char. He appeared again in the Anime Grand Prix from 1989 as the sixteenth most popular male anime character. In an official Sunrise poll focused in the best team ups between former enemies, he and Char were first. In a NHK poll, he was voted as the third best Gundam character.

An EFSF military outfit was once used on a poster to encourage Japanese people to vote, and news articles refer it as the "Amuro style election poster", since the actor used is a stunt actor used in place of the voice actor of Amuro Ray. Amuro was recognized as a culturally significant subject by the nation of Japan on October 23, 2000, with the inclusion of the suit and of the main pilot on two stamps in the 20th Century Stamp Series. Amuro, along with five other notable mecha and pilots from the various Gundam series, were recognized in the second set of "Anime Heroes and Heroines" stamps, released in Japan in 2005. In an Anime!Anime! poll, Amuro and Quattro were voted as one of the best anime rivals turned into allies. Merchandising beased on Amuro's underwear was also released.

Anime director Goro Taniguchi was often asked if his character Suzaku Kururugi from Code Geass was inspired by Amuro as a result of several similarities such as how both pilot a white mecha and share a rivalry with a masked man; in Suzaku's case it is Lelouch Lamperouge. Although Taniguchi denied this claims, insisting that Suzaku was instead based on Luke Skywalker from Star Wars, he still noticed there were several similarities in retrospective. When comparing these two rivalries, Taniguchi commented that while Amuro and Char became rivals in war, Suzaku and Lelouch were instead close friends before an eventual war in Code Geass where they become recurring enemies.
