= Char Aznable =

Fictional character from the Gundam franchise

- Mobile Suit Gundam character
- Principality of Zeon Commander and ace pilot Char Aznable
- First appearance: Mobile Suit Gundam Episode 1: "Gundam Rising" (1979)
- Created by: Yoshiyuki Tomino; Yoshikazu Yasuhiko
- Voiced by: Japanese: Shūichi Ikeda (most appearances) Mayumi Tanaka (Origin, young) Toshihiko Seki (Build Fighters: Battlogue) Katsuyuki Konishi (Gundam-san) Yuuki Shin (GQuuuuuuX); English: Michael Kopsa (most appearances) Tom Edwards (Zeta) Steve Blum (MSG I-III) Keith Silverstein (Origin) Kyle McCarley (GQuuuuuuX)

In-universe information
- Full name: Casval Rem Deikun (real name)
- Aliases: Édouard Mass; Red Comet; Quattro Bajeena (Zeta); Shirouzu (GQuuuuuuX)
- Family: Zeon Zum Deikun (father); Astria Tor Deikun (mother); Artesia Som Deikun a.k.a. Sayla Mass (sister)
- Significant others: Lalah Sune (girlfriend, [MSG]); Nanai Miguel (girlfriend, [MSG-CC])
- Nationality: Principality of Zeon
- Allegiance: Principality of Zeon [MSG]; Axis [post MSG, pre MSG-Z]; Anti Earth Union Group [MSG-Z]; Neo Zeon [MSG-CC]

Char Aznable (Japanese: シャア・アズナブル, Hepburn: Shā Azunaburu), born Casval Rem Deikun (Japanese: キャスバル・レム・ダイクン, Hepburn: Kyasubaru Remu Daikun) and also known as Édouard Mass (エドワウ・マス, Edowau Masu), is a fictional character from the Gundam franchise. He is originally one of the main antagonists in Mobile Suit Gundam working for the Principality of Zeon, named after his late father Zeon Zum Deikun, with the honorary title of "The Red Comet" (赤い彗星, Akai Suisei) during Gundam's One Year War. Despite having opposed Earth Federation soldier Amuro Ray several times, in the sequel Mobile Suit Zeta Gundam he becomes Quattro Bajeena (クワトロ・バジーナ, Kuwatoro Bajīna), an Anti-Earth Union Group (AEUG) pilot fighting alongside the series' main characters against the elitist Titans, while also acting as a mentor to Zeta's protagonist Kamille. In his final appearance in the Prime-UC in Char's Counterattack, he assumes leadership of the Neo Zeon movement, and becomes the titular antagonist of the film. An alternate Char debuts in Mobile Suit Gundam GQuuuuuuX, which sets in an alternate-UC branching timeline, he steals the Gundam and becomes its pilot instead of Amuro, setting the series' alternate events culminating in Zeon's victory of the One Year War, though Char would mysteriously disappear in the final battle.

Char became one of Gundam's most iconic characters, often overshadowing Amuro's popularity. He also appeared as the most popular male anime character in Animage's Anime Grand Prix poll as well as in several other polls highlighting his popularity in the Gundam franchise. His role in the original has often been praised alongside his rivalry with Amuro.

== Creation ==
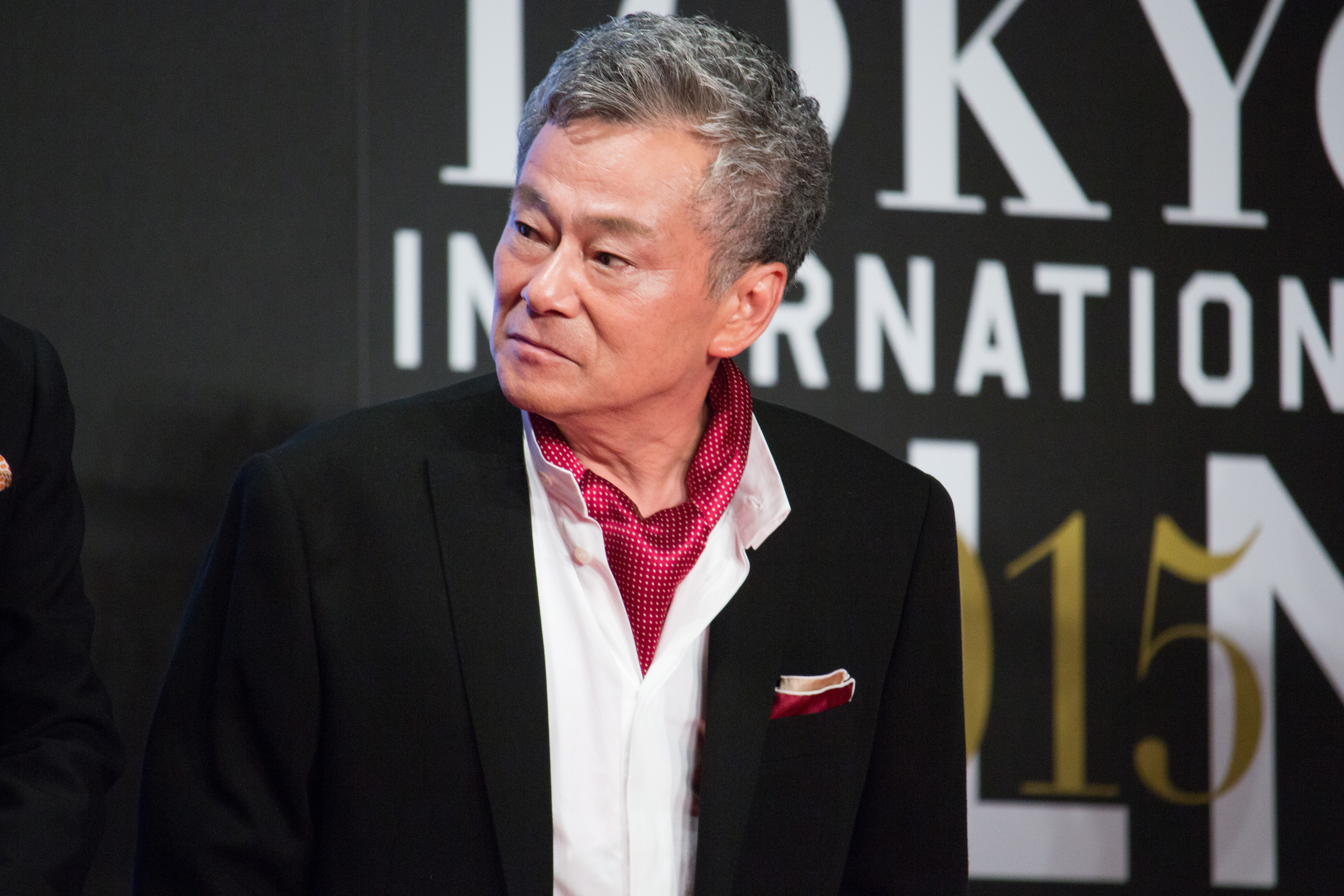
Voice actor Shūichi Ikeda

Char Aznable was based on historic fighter-pilot Manfred von Richthofen who shared a similar nickname, "Red Baron". As a result, many of Char's actions were similar to Richthofen's during World War I since Tomino wanted to illustrate the chaos produced by wars in Gundam. Amuro was introduced as an ordinary man in contrast to his rival the "Red Comet". This made Amuro hard to write as he was meant to oppose Char whom Tomino found more interesting. Tōru Furuya, who voiced Amuro, had fun in his work as during recordings of the series he befriended Char's voice Actor Shuichi Ikeda. However, he was not close to Tomino. Originally, Tomino did not want to include Amuro in Zeta Gundam and when trying to kill him, he failed to do it. As a result, he decided to put Amuro on a friendly relationship with Char. Furuya said that while Amuro also had popularity, he could not surpass his rival, Char, a common trait he sometimes find common in anime where there are rivalries. The name Char Aznable was inspired by Armenian-French singer and songwriter Charles Aznavour (シャルル・アズナヴール, Sharuru Azunavūru) and a character named Charkin in an earlier robot anime Reideen (ライディーン).

== Fictional biography ==
=== Mobile Suit Gundam The Origin ===
Born Casval Rem Deikun, he is the elder brother of Artesia Som Deikun and son of Zeon Zum Deikun, a dignitary who spoke out for peace between spacenoids and earthlings and founded the Zeon Republic. Following their father's supposed heart attack, which was suspected to be an assassination orchestrated by Deikun's deputy Degwin Sodo Zabi, young Casval and his sister Artesia escape to Earth with the help of family friend Jimba Ral (father of Ramba Ral). While the Zabi family rises to power, the two Deikun children spend several years living a luxurious life under the guardianship of the aristocratic Don Teabolo Mass, who names them Edward and Sayla, and treats them like his own children. During this time, Jimba Ral constantly reminds Casval of the Zabi Family's betrayal of his father. After narrowly escaping another attempt on their lives (in which Jimba Ral dies), they flee to the Texas Colony.

They live for a time in a house set up by Texas Colony's chief manager Roger Aznable, still under Teabolo Mass's care. They meet Roger's son Char Aznable, and discover that he and Casval are nearly identical, except Casval's eyes are blue while Char's are brown. Eventually Char is taken in by Gihren Zabi's propaganda, and against his father's wishes sets off for officer training school. Casval decides to accompany him under the guise of looking out for his friend. Kycilia Zabi finds out that Casval is headed back to Side 3, and without consulting Gihren, orders Casval's death. Both near-identical boys are booked to leave on the same flight, but an antique pistol and fake explosives are found in Char's bag. Not wanting to miss the entrance exam, Char accepts Casval's suggestion to swap clothes in the restroom. Char boards the ship under the name Edward Mass, while Casval, under the name Char Aznable is detained overnight. Shortly after departure, the ship explodes and kills everyone aboard, likely due to the work of Kycilia's henchmen. "Edward Mass" is listed among the dead and Casval takes on the name Char, enters the Zeon Military Academy and begins wearing sunglasses to hide his eye color (as it wouldn't match any of the real Char's IDs).

After entering the academy, Char excels in his training and befriends Garma Zabi. As relations between the Zeon Republic (which has been renamed the Principality of Zeon) and the Federation deteriorate, the Federation increases their troop strength in Side 3. There is widespread fear that this troop increase is in fact an invasion and occupation force. On the eve of troop increase, Casval incites Garma to lead other students in the academy to storm the Federation base and subdue the stationed troops. For this action Casval is stripped of his rank and expelled from the academy. He travels to Earth and works at the construction site of Federation headquarters in Jaburo. After hostility breaks out between Zeon and the Federation, he returns to Side 3 and joins the Zeon mobile suit assault forces under the command of Admiral Dozle Zabi. He displays superior fighting abilities during the Battle of Loum, single-handedly destroying five Federation Magellan-class battleships by pushing his red-painted Zaku to fly at a breakneck speed, which earned him the nickname "Red Comet". He was promoted an exceptional two ranks to Lieutenant Commander.

=== Mobile Suit Gundam ===
On his way back from a mission to clear out guerrilla forces of the Federation Forces, he discovers a new type of ship (the White Base). By tracking it, he obtains information that the Federation Forces are secretly developing mobile suits in Side 7. When his subordinates sent out on a reconnaissance mission are destroyed by the RX-78-2 Gundam, including their Zaku, he sneaks into the colony himself and is reunited with his sister, Artesia (Sayla), who had evacuated to the White Base to serve in the army, and then has his first confrontation with his eventual rival, Amuro Ray. Although Char overwhelms Amuro, who is unfamiliar with combat, from start to finish, he is unable to overcome the Gundam's strong armor that can bounce back his attack and its powerful beam rifle.

Later, he is ordered to capture or destroy the White Base and the Gundam, and pursues the White Base as it escapes from Side 7. He launches numerous attacks, including infiltrating the Federation Forces' space fortress Luna II, where the White Base has escaped, and sabotaging it, but he fails. He loses many of his men and Zaku units. However, during a surprise attack aimed at the White Base's entry into the atmosphere, despite the numerous casualty of his squad, he succeeds in bringing it down under Zeon controlled territory, which is under the leadership of Garma.

Unknown to many, Char is secretly plotting revenge against the Zabi family, and utilize the opportunity by luring Garma and his fleet within the firing range of the Federation's White Base, resulting in his death. Prior to Garma's death at the hands of the White Base, Char says to him, "Garma, blame this on the misfortune of your birth." This incurred the wrath of Dozle, and Char was dismissed from the Space Strike Force. He was eventually incorporated into Kycilia Zabi's Assault Cavalry. Later in the war, Char begins a bitter rivalry with Federation pilot Amuro Ray, and he develops a relationship with Lalah Sune, a Newtype girl he saved from a brothel. Char also develops into a Newtype himself, and forms psychic bonds with both Amuro and Lalah. Char's abilities and natural charisma allow him to inspire and manipulate. Lalah is killed in battle, taking a blow from Amuro meant for Char; this results in a bitter hatred between Char and Amuro.

During the war, Char draws on Zeon's philosophy to form his identity. The Zeon Principality is largely an authoritarian state that values independence from the Earth and later the destruction of Earth's inhabitants. With his devotion to free all of those who are "trapped by gravity's pull" he is able to face the most deadly outcomes with dignity and leadership.

In the Battle of A Baoa Qu, Char and Amuro's bitter rivalry reaches the level that they engage in a gunfight and then a sword fight after both lose their mobile suits. In the duel, Char realizes he has been distracted by his rivalry with Amuro, and refocuses on his true enemy – the Zabi family. An ensuing explosion knocks them apart, and Char rushes to save his sister. After being told by a dying Zeon soldier that Kycilia Zabi, the last surviving Zabi, is about to leave, he finds Kycilia's departing ship and kills her. He then disappears amidst the explosion and is logically presumed dead.

=== Mobile Suit Gundam – Char's Deleted Affair – A Portrait of a Young Comet ===
At the end of the One Year War, Char goes to Axis and his experience there is partly depicted in the manga Char's Deleted Affair, where he heroically protects Axis in two major battles against the Earth Federation. He stays there until the end of U.C. 0082, when he gets back to Side 3 for a special mission to protect Haman Karn's inspection journey of Side 3. When they arrive at Zum City in U.C. 0083, he gets an invitation by George Miguel (Brother of Nanai) to join a paramilitary spacenoid organization within the Earth Federation Force.

However, upon hearing of Maharaja Karn's fatal illness in late May 0083, Char and Haman both decide to return to Axis. Once they do, they're intercepted by the pro-war Axis faction that wishes to restart the conflict with the Earth Federation, led by one Colonel Enzo. A civil war breaks out, with Char and Haman eventually overcoming Enzo's forces. Unfortunately, Mahajara Karn – Haman's father and the true political leader of Axis' – dies just shortly before the battle ends, and Haman now finds herself in charge of both Axis and Mineva, Dozle's daughter and last surviving member of the Zabi family. Tension between Char and Haman over the future of Axis and Zeon lead Char to finally leave the asteroid permanently with over 600 other soldiers on October 29, 0083.

=== Mobile Suit Zeta Gundam ===
Having left Axis Zeon, Char returns to the Earth Sphere in September U.C. 0084, and infiltrates the Earth Federation Forces ranking with the alias "Quattro Bajeena". Almost immediately, he finds himself involved in conflicts against the Earth Federation's newly formed Titan Task Force, fighting and shooting down two enemy warships within hours of acquiring his new identity. After meeting the Federation politician Commodore Blex Forer, Char joins a group of former Earth Federation Forces soldiers and eventually becomes a leading member of the Anti-Earth Union Group.

This time, rather than serving as the rival of the new protagonist, Kamille Bidan, Char serves as Kamille's mentor in the war against the Earth Federation's oppressive Titans organization. In Zeta Gundam, Char becomes an ally of his former adversaries in Mobile Suit Gundam: Amuro Ray, Hayato Kobayashi and Bright Noa. He serves under Bright Noa as leader of AEUG mobile suit forces.

During this period, Char loses faith in himself as a decision maker. It seems to be his greatest fear, as he normally displays none in regard to war. When assuming the identity of Quattro he willingly places himself under the command of his former enemies. He has discovered that there can be compromise in the future of Earth's population and the colonies. In the course of Mobile Suit Zeta Gundam even Bright Noa, who lost crew to Char's attacks on the White Base, urges him to drop the Quattro facade and become a leader to the Spacenoids, or those raised in space colonies. Mobile Suit Zeta Gundam portrays Char's image as a hero who is always willing to stand up and fight for the freedom of spacenoids. His political speech in front of Federation Assembly in Dakar, which is broadcast throughout Earth and Space, is one of the most important events in the U.C. Gundam timeline. It seals Char's total commitment toward space colonization and migration of humanity to space.

Despite AEUG's victory in the Gryps Conflict against the Titans, Char is defeated in the final battle by Haman Karn, leader of the Axis Zeon (later Neo Zeon) faction and assumed dead. However, as the final credits roll, Char's damaged mobile suit floats by with its cockpit hatch open.

=== Mobile Suit Gundam: Char's Counterattack ===
Char returns in the movie Mobile Suit Gundam: Char's Counterattack, set five years later, as the leader of a new Neo Zeon faction. He intends to create a nuclear winter by dropping the massive asteroid base Axis on the Earth, hence forcing a complete migration into space, which he believes will make all of humanity evolve into Newtypes. Only one thing stands in his way: the Federation's Londo Bell task force, and their top ace pilot, his old archrival Amuro Ray.

In the second Neo Zeon movement, both Char and Amuro pilot mobile suits equipped with an advanced psycommu system known as psycoframe. Char authorized Anaheim Electronics to pass the psycoframe technology to the development team responsible for Amuro's Nu Gundam, effectively planning a fair showdown between them in advance. After Char's mobile suit is destroyed by Amuro in the duel, Amuro captures Char's escape pod, and against Char's taunting, attempts to push the asteroid Axis away from Earth. The intense willpower of Amuro and all the pilots assisting him causes Nu Gundam's psycoframes to resonate and overload, resulting in a spectacular aurora with Axis pushed out of Earth's orbit. Both Amuro and Char disappear without a trace in the incident. There is no concrete evidence about them being deceased in the movie although Nanai Miguel did claim that Char's life force was fading away, as Amuro intercepted Axis and cries for Char when Axis is finally pushed back. The fates of either character were never revealed in the film, though the novelization of Mobile Suit Gundam: Char's Counterattack confirms both as KIA. The follow-up Gundam Unicorn also supports this idea. However, in the official Universal Century timeline for the animated series, it lists Amuro Ray and Char Aznable as MIA.

=== Mobile Suit Gundam GQuuuuuuX ===
In a branching timeline from the original Mobile Suit Gundam series' continuity, due to Gene's inability to sortie for his mission, Char Aznable participate in the Side-7 Gundam-jack mission, and successfully steals the RX-78-2 Gundam developed by the Earth Federation and becomes its pilot instead of Amuro Ray, renaming it the "Red Gundam" based on his preferences. This event changes the outcome of the One Year War between the Federation and the Principality of Zeon, culminating with Zeon's victory. During the final battle, his apparent attempt to prevent the Solomon asteroid being dropped onto Lunar City Granada results in a mythical phenomenon that sent him to a different reality.

When he managed to return to his own reality, Char handed the Red Gundam to the mysterious Shuji Ito, while he himself attempted to destroy an object that destabilize his own reality. He takes on a new identity as Shirouzu, a Zeon engineer where he develops the Yomagn'tho, in order to send the Rose of Sharon (which is later revealed to be a stasis Lalah from one of the many alternate timelines where he loses his life to Amuro), which was the central cause of the Zeknova phenomenon, back to its reality of origin. Following the incident, he retires from Zeon and went to his reality's Lalah, fulfilling the other Lalah's wishes as she and Char finally reached the ending she sought for.

== Reception ==
=== Popularity ===
Char Aznable is not only a character, but has become a brand name. Char, along with five other notable mecha and pilots from the various Gundam series, were recognized in the second set of "Anime Heroes and Heroines" stamps, released in Japan in 2005. Char Aznable has routinely placed in the top 10 lists of popular characters in both Gundam-specific and general-oriented fan magazines in Japan, such as Gundam Ace and Animage, typically ranking higher than the main character and his rival, Amuro Ray. In Gundam Ace, Char is consistently in the top 3 of the list, and held the number 1 spot for long periods of time, despite the fact that Gundam Ace tallies votes for Char's alter-ego Quattro Bajeena separately. In fact, Quattro also consistently ranks in the top 10. In both Gunpla and Figure magazines it is almost guaranteed to see Char's custom red mobile suit. He has also been voted as the second most popular male character from the 1980s by Newtype readers. During January from 2007, Oricon made a poll in which they asked Japanese fans from manga and anime which characters from any series they would most like to see in spinoff series. He won the men's poll while ranked second in the overall. In a NHK poll from 2018 he was voted as the best Gundam character. In an Anime!Anime! poll, Amuro and Quattro were voted as one of the best anime rivals turned into allies.

On the Japanese bulletin board 2channel, the Gundam forums are named Char custom (シャア専用), and the anonymous placeholder for the name is changed to "3 times more than the usual anonymous" (通常の名無しさんの3倍), a reference to the "3 times faster than the usual Zaku" line from the original series. Char Custom refers to Char's tendency to highly customized standard Mobile Suits to his exact specifications and generally making the said units far more potent than normal. This usually involves the character coloring his suits red, which led some people to go as far as to label anything red "Char-custom", and to make vague references to the "3 times more potent" line in the original Gundam series (e.g. A red pencil might write 3 times faster, or is 3 times more likely to break). This pinkish-red color was actually due to the excess of pinkish red color ink the animation company had at the time. It is, however, stated in the game Gireh's Greed that the color is actually only the color of an unpainted Zaku due to the grudge from him being the top graduate from military school.

Bandai has capitalized on the character's popularity by licensing out the name to various products. There has been a Char-custom laptop, Char-custom GameCube, and a Char-custom motorbike helmet. All these products have a red satin finish, and have the goldleaf Zeon insignia or the emblem of Char's Neo Zeon emblazoned on them. A Char-custom Game Boy Advance SP was also created in Japan (with many sources claiming its battery will last 3 times as long as the normal GBA, or even that it will crash 3 times as much). On July 25, 2006, GE Consumer Finance released a Char Custom credit card, which receives three times as many bonus points per 1000 yen spent compared to their other Gundam-related credit cards. Japanese cell phone company Soft Bank released a special Char Custom cell phone in late 2007, with a very large red Zaku head which serves as the charger base. Char related apparel and accessories span a wide range, from the ubiquitous Quattro sunglasses to Char lighters, neckties, wristbands, caps, wallets and a wide range of T-shirts. The creator of Char Aznable, Yoshiyuki Tomino, does not like the idea of making money this way. He feels that by sticking the term "Char's Custom" to the products culturally suggests the quality of the product is superior to other brands. However, most of them are only colored red and are basically the same as the products on which they are based; ironically, some of these "Char Custom" products are even of lower quality than the baseline products. Creator Yoshiyuki Tomino believes that "having satisfaction in such products just because they are popular and can earn money is a sin, since it cannot teach a correct social sense to the newer generation".

In the 2017 live-action adaptation of Gintama, Char makes a cameo appearance, arriving at Gengai's lab and repair shop to pick up his Zaku 2 Commander type, much to the astonishment of manga-obsessed swordsman Gintoki. In this movie, which is packed to the gills with pop culture references, Char is played by actor and singer Seiji Rokkaku. In a planned spaceflight for 2006, Soyuz TMA-9, a Japanese internet investor named Daisuke Enomoto had asked to dress up as Char Aznable. However, medical restrictions prevented him from participating in the flight. Toyota also formed a new branch called Zeonic Toyota planning to issue a series of special cars, the first one being Char Aznable special Auris.

=== Critical response ===
According to Aaron J. Kane from University of Vermont, Tomino managed to create a realistic series by prioritizing on Amuro and Char rather than focus more on the robots like his previous works. Although his duel with Amuro in the film was considered the highlight of the film, Allen Divers from Anime News Network criticized how their rivalry was left unfulfilled. Amuro's rivalry with Char and their subsequent final battle in the television series, the titular mobile suit stops a fatal laser beam from killing Amuro and is reduced to slag before his eyes. This final fight destroys Char's mobile suit as well, enabling Amuro to resume battling his rival. Amuro's ability to stand fight; and ultimately, choose not to fight, is a result of his liberation from his Gundam mobile suit; which is in turn a product of the series' focus on characters over the mecha themselves.

THEM Anime Reviews' Carlo Ross saw Char in the film as the "true star" believing him to overshadow Amuro. On the other hand, J. Doyle Wallis criticized their rivalry in the film considering it a "rehash" of the events of the television series. In Char's Counterattack, it is not until Amuro re engineers the RX-93 with the psycho frame system that he is able to battle Char on equal footing. This handling of Gundams was compared to that of Formula 1 drivers and their own race cars, a connection that still holds for the film. The macro-action of Char's Counterattack briefly pauses whenever pilots are forced to dock mid-battle in order to attend to repairs and refueling. Such specific attention to the details of the mobile suits in the movie simultaneously be re-created in the model kits that would be released after the film's debut. Anime News Network panned the handling of the young Quess who is interested in the middleaged Char. Char manipulates Quess into becoming his soldier, which gives his character a disturbing portrayal especially with the notorious age gap. FandomPost found Char's villain traits out-of-character as a result of how heroic he became in Zeta Gundam and, like other writers, criticized the handling of Quess. Although Char is not present in Hathaway: The Sorcery of Nymph Circe, Richard Eisenbeis from Anime News Network claimed that protagonist Noa Hataway tried imitating Char's role from Counterattack but lacked the power of the previous antagonist, leading him to suffer a mental breakdown during the narrative as he is against finding happiness.

For GQuuuuuuX, IGN was surprised by how the alternate take of Char managed to surpass Amuro as the new Gundam pilot in this alternate take of the series. The introduction featuring Char Aznable and showing the divergence in the Universal Century timeline central to GQuuuuuuX's narrative was appreciated for its audiovisual and tonal fidelity to the original series. James Whitbrook of Gizmodo praised the reuse of the original's soundtrack and audio cues alongside the faithful recreation of its scenes and set pieces, saying it recontextualized these elements "in fascinating ways to fit its alternative rendition of events where Char is suddenly the protagonist of this familiar narrative." Richard Eisenbeis of Anime News Network said the combination of the "pure fanservice" of the introduction and the new story made Beginning a cathartic experience for fans of the original series while remaining accessible to first-time Gundam viewers. Char's return in the final episodes earned praise by Anime News Network enough to call him the "real star" due to his stylish actions as he changes uniforms and clothing like a magical girl and retains a seductive aura in front of Machu.

== See also ==
- The Red Baron in popular culture
