= List of Mobile Suit Gundam characters =

This is a list of fictional characters from the 1979 Japanese science fiction anime television series Mobile Suit Gundam.

== Earth Federation ==
The White Base crew, from left to right: Top: Kai Shiden, Ryu José, Amuro Ray, Fraw Bow, Sayla Mass, Mirai Yashima and Bright Noa; Bottom: Hayato Kobayashi, Katz Hawin, Letz Cofan and Kikka Kitamoto.

=== Amuro Ray ===
Amuro Ray (アムロ・レイ, Amuro Rei) is the son of Tem Ray, the project leader for the Earth Federation's Project V, which produces the prototype mobile suits Gundam, Guncannon, and Guntank to combat the Principality of Zeon's Zaku. At the beginning of the Mobile Suit Gundam TV series, Amuro is merely a 15-year-old civilian, along with his friends Fraw Bow and Hayato Kobayashi, living in Side 7, one of the few space colonies untouched by the One Year War at the time. Amuro is a talented amateur mechanic, which would be called an Otaku nowadays, and as a hobby designed the basketball-sized talking robot Haro. Born on Earth in Prince Rupert, Like his rival Char Aznable, Amuro got his own nickname during the One Year War: the White Devil (白い悪魔, Shiroi Akuma). He was given this moniker after defeating 14 MS-09R Rick Doms in the Battle of Solomon. Amuro and Char Aznable faced off several times during the course of the One Year War, but it was not until when Lalah Sune was killed during one of their battles that this rivalry turned into a fierce hatred of one another. In the anime television series, Amuro Ray is voiced by Tōru Furuya in Japanese and Brad Swaile in English. In the anime film, he is voiced by Michael Lindsay.

=== Sayla Mass ===
Voiced by: Yō Inoue, Kaori Nazuka (Gundam-san) (Japanese); Alaina Burnett (MSG), Olivia Bardeau (MSG I-III), Maggie O'Connor (Origin) (English)

Sayla Mass (セイラ・マス, Seira Masu) is a medical student from the incomplete single space colony of the Earth Federation's Side 7 who ends up on the White Base along with other civilians including Amuro Ray, Fraw Bow, Hayato Kobayashi, Kai Shiden and Mirai Yashima. She would later be revealed to be Artesia Som Deikun (アルテイシア・ソム・ダイクン, Aruteishia Somu Deikun), the daughter of the Zeon Republic's founder Zeon Zum Deikun and the younger sister of Char Aznable. Sayla is almost immediately recruited as a soldier, and set to the task of watching over the civilian refugees. With the near total lack of experienced personnel to defend White Base (most original crew members were killed in the Principality of Zeon's attack on Side 7), Sayla first serves as acting captain Bright Noa's communications officer and later as a combat pilot.

=== Bright Noa ===
When Char Aznable attacks the colony, Side 7, all the officers on the White Base are incapacitated, leaving Ensign Bright Noa (ブライト・ノア, Buraito Noa) with the highest seniority on the ship, and he assumes command from the wounded Captain Paolo Cassius, who later dies of his injuries. After a series of close calls and with help from Amuro Ray and the Gundam, Bright brings the White Base safely to Federation headquarters at Jaburo. Because of the Zeon forces obsession with the White Base, the Federation allows Bright to remain in command and sends the ship out as a decoy. Bright commands the White Base through several major operations in The One Year War, including the last stand of Zeon at asteroid A Baoa Qu. In the anime television series, Bright Noa is voiced by Hirotaka Suzuoki in Japanese and Chris Kalhoon in English. In the anime film, he is voiced by Wheat St. James.

=== Mirai Yashima ===
Mirai Yashima (ミライ・ヤシマ) is one of the three White Base crew to display Newtype abilities, along with Amuro Ray and Sayla Mass. Mirai is a civilian who joins the White Base crew after the attack on Side 7. Her training as a space glider pilot makes her the best choice to take the White Base's helm, and Mirai soon becomes both Bright Noa's trusted deputy and a surrogate mother to the ship's young crew. She is also the daughter of a powerful and well-connected family, which causes complications later in the series when she is reunited with her fiancée, Side 6's district attorney Cameron Bloom, whom she disliked as all he cared about was avoiding the war by fleeing to the neutral Side 6. Mirai was also briefly attracted to Sleggar Law but Sleggar pointed out that she was just too good for someone like him and Sleggar gave her the ring that belonged to his mother shortly before he died.

=== Fraw Bow ===
Fraw Bow (フラウ・ボゥ, Furau Bō) is Amuro's close friend and confidante, and devoted to his welfare. With Amuro's parents separated and his father Dr. Tem Ray frequently away on business for the Earth Federation's Project V, Fraw takes it upon herself to make sure that the perhaps charitably-described "engineering nerd" or "mecha otaku" eats, sleeps, bathes, lives in some degree of cleanliness, and—in her initial appearance—follows military evacuation orders. Fraw and Amuro become crew members of White Base, along other Side 7 civilians. Becoming the primary caretaker of three young children, Katz Hawin, Letz Cofan, and Kikka Kitamoto, in addition to Amuro. As the distance between her and Amuro grows, Fraw joins the medical staff to help distract herself. She is married to Hayato some time after the One Year War. Fraw finishes the war serving on the ship's bridge as White Base's communications officer. In the anime television series, Fraw Bow is voiced by Rumiko Ukai in Japanese and Kristie Marsden in English. In the anime film, she is voiced by Melissa Fahn.

=== Hayato Kobayashi ===
Hayato Kobayashi (ハヤト・コバヤシ) is one of Amuro Ray's neighbors on Side 7. Short and stocky and with a tendency towards insecurity, Hayato often measures himself against his friend Amuro's accomplishments. After surviving the attack on his Side 7 home, Hayato becomes the co-pilot for the RX-75 Guntank alongside Ryu José, largely out of a sense of rivalry with Amuro. After Ryu sacrifices his life to save Amuro from Hamon Crowley, Hayato continues to pilot the Guntank after it is modified for use by a single person. In the anime television series, Hayato Kobayashi is voiced by Kiyonobu Suzuki in Japanese and Matt Smith in English. In the anime film, he is voiced by Richard Cansino.

=== Kai Shiden ===
Kai Shiden (カイ・シデン)

Voiced by: Toshio Furukawa (Japanese), Richard Ian Cox (English), Eddie Frierson (English, MSG I-III)

At the onset of the One Year War in UC 0079, Kai Shiden was living in the space colony Green Oasis in Bunch 1 of Side 7. Kai Shiden is tall and lanky in stature with a mop of gray hair, and his snarky and sarcastic personality often gets him scolded or slapped. After surviving the Zeon attack on Side 7, Kai became one of the many evacuees escaping on the Pegasus class assault carrier SCV-70 White Base. However, due to a shortage of crew and soldiers to staff the warship, Kai was asked to become a pilot to help defend the White Base from frequent Zeon attacks. Kai was assigned to pilot the RX-77 Guncannon mobile suit, the unit he would remain in charge of for the rest of the One Year War.

A natural coward, cynic, and pessimist, Kai could often be found on the sidelines making smart-alecky comments. His fighting style leaned towards bombarding foes with the Guncannon's long-range armaments, but when he got in a fix he was able to pull off hand-to-hand attacks with the Guncannon. He dislikes it when things move slowly. However, Kai quickly became disenchanted with war and he decided to desert the White Base when it was docked for repairs in Belfast, Northern Ireland. In Belfast, Kai meets a young girl named Miharu Ratokey who lives just outside the city, and agrees to sneak her onto the White Base and take her to the Earth Federation headquarters in Jaburo, located along the Amazon River in South America. Kai soon figures out that Miharu was actually a hired Zeon spy sent to infiltrate the White Base and discover Jaburo's location.

During a sudden Zeon attack on the White Base while traveling over the Atlantic Ocean, Kai and Miharu go out in a Gunperry transport plane. During the battle, controls in the cockpit get stuck and Miharu goes down to help fire the plane's missiles manually. But she is knocked from the Gunperry by the missiles' exhaust blast, and falls out of the plane over the Atlantic Ocean. Miharu's death marks a turning point in Kai's development as he works through his grief.

=== Ryu José ===
Voiced by: Shōzō Iizuka (Japanese), Ward Perry (English, MSG) and Bob Papenbrook (English, MSG I-III)

Ryu José (リュウ・ホセイ, Ryū Hosei) A large, stocky Latino man with a dusky complexion, Ryu was a test pilot-in-training for the Earth Federation on Side 7. When the colony was attacked by Char Aznable, Ryu took control of the Core Fighter jet to protect the White Base. Being a gentle, caring, considerate comrade, Ryu was the best mediator to ease the tension between the uptight Bright Noa and the young civilian recruits.

Ryu is killed during the White Base's attack from Crowley Hamon. Though critically wounded in firefights during Ramba Ral's attempted boarding attack, Ryu drives his Core Fighter kamikaze-style into Hamon's fighter in order to save the lives of Amuro Ray and the crew of the White Base.

His death moves the entire crew of White Base to tears and the reality of war truly began to sink in, as everyone felt responsible for his death. Several crew members even try to call to his spirit for advice later on. Amuro is enraged when the only reward for Ryu's heroism is a three rank posthumous promotion at Jaburo.

=== Sleggar Law ===
Voiced by: Tesshō Genda (Japanese, MSG), Makio Inoue (Japanese, MSG I-III, MSG I-III special edition) and Bill Mondy (English)

Sleggar Law joins the White Base crew after they arrive at Jaburo. Sleggar initially looks down on the White Bases' young crew, but soon develops a respect for them. He has a brief romance with Mirai Yashima. However, Sleggar feels that Mirai is too wonderful and deserves better than someone like him, so he rejects further advancement in their relationship. Shortly before his final sortie against the MA-08 Big Zam at the Battle of Solomon, Sleggar gives Mirai a ring that he inherited from his mother.

=== Matilda Ajan ===
Matilda Ajan (マチルダ・アジャン, Machiruda Ajan) is the commanding officer of the Earth Federation's Medea supply corps. At times Matilda also serves as a personal envoy for General Revil, carrying messages and orders from him to other ships. When the White Base is trapped in Zeon-controlled airspace over North America, it is the vital supplies delivered by the Medea supply corps, which has allowed the beleaguered assault carrier to make desperately needed repairs and escape over the Pacific Ocean. Due to her habit of showing up when the White Base is in a bind and helping them in whatever way she can, Miss Matilda is seen as the guardian angel of the vessel. Also due to her stunning beauty she becomes the dream girl of many of the young male crew members staffing the White Base, especially the young Amuro Ray.

Miss Matilda is engaged to Lieutenant Woody Malden, who was a chief military engineer stationed in the Earth Federation headquarters of Jaburo. When the ship reached Asia, Miss Matilda gave the White Base orders to head to Ukraine to take part in Operation Odessa, a large-scale military operation to wrest control of the mining facilities at Odessa away from the Principality of Zeon. However, en route to participate in the battle the White Base is attacked by the Zeon ace pilot trio, the Black Tri-Stars. In order to protect the White Base, Matilda rammed her Medea into one of the Black Tri-Stars' MS-09 Doms, in an attempt to knock it down. But Dom pilot Ortega hit back, smashing the Medea's cockpit so the transporter crashed into the ground, exploding and killing Matilda instantly. Lieutenant Junior Grade Matilda Ajan was later listed as killed in action on November 6, U.C. 0079. Afterwards, Amuro meets Matilda's fiancé Lieutenant Woody in Jaburo and apologizes for not being able to protect Matilda, but Woody forgives him, since it was war, and she died protecting her friends. During Char's assault on Jaburo Lieutenant Woody also dies while protecting the ship like his girlfriend did, as he attacked Char using a simple attack hoverfighter that was easily destroyed by Char's Z'Gok, but gave White Base crew members enough time to escape. In the anime television series, Mathilda Ajan is voiced by Keiko Toda in Japanese and Sylvia Zaradic in English. In the anime film, she is voiced by Melissa Williamson.

=== General Revil ===
Voiced by: Masaru Ikeda (Japanese, MSG), Yasuo Muramatsu (Japanese, MSG I-III), Katsunosuke Hori (Japanese, MSG I-III special edition), Michael Dobson (English, MSG) and Tony Pope (English, MSG I-III)

Admiral Revil (also referred to as General Revil) is one of the Earth Federation's leading Space Force commanders. He is mentioned often, but does not make any personal appearances until the latter half of the series. Before his appointment as head of the Earth Federation Space Force Revil was a Lieutenant General from the Earth Federation Ground Force. Revil's biggest claim to fame came after being captured by the Zeon's Black Tri-Stars after his flagship Ananke was sunk by Zeon's mobile suit attack forces during the Battle of Loum. Shortly thereafter, Revil, aided by Federal agents and sympathizers within Zeon, escaped to Side 6 and returned to the Federation. Broadcasting from Luna II, he made his famous "Zeon is Exhausted!" speech from what he saw in Zeon during his capture. This speech boosted the morale of the Federation Forces, caused the Federation to toughen their stance, and resulted in the rejection of the terms of their surrender (it was said that Kycilia Zabi smashed the table in rage after hearing the news). Despite this, both sides agreed to a ban on NBC weapons, colony drops and maltreatment of POWs by signing the Antarctic Treaty.

== Principality of Zeon ==
Principality of Zeon, from left to right: Giren Zabi, Dozle Zabi, Degwin Sodo Zabi, Kycilia Zabi, Garma Zabi and Char Aznable.

=== Char Aznable ===
Char Aznable (シャア・アズナブル, Shaa Azunaburu)

=== Lalah Sune ===
Lalah Sune (ララァ・スン, Rarā Sun)

Voiced by: Keiko Han (Japanese), Megumi Han (Japanese, Gundam-san), Saori Hayami (Japanese, MSG: Origin), Willow Johnson (English, MSG, MSG-CC), Lia Sargent (English, MSG I-III), Lipica Shah (English, MSG: Origin)

Lalah is a young woman who is the student of Professor Flanagan due to her powerful Newtype abilities, and as such is also one of the key test subjects in the development of Newtype-related weaponry. Being one of the earliest and most known Newtypes, her powers are accompanied by a profound spiritual awareness.

Despite her gentle nature, Lalah is fiercely loyal to the man who saved her life —- Char Aznable, the scheming "Red Comet". In the novel he found her in an Indian brothel, where she worked after losing her parents in the war. In the MSG:Origin, episode 7:Encounter with Lalah, her parents were alive and she was sending money to them from her work helping a mobster win at gambling. This attracts a mob called Manaus, and Char takes her away using a Mobile worker. She was assigned to pilot the Newtype use mobile armor MAN-08 Elmeth as a part of the Newtype research project, conducted by the Flanagan Institute. Lalah is ranked as an ensign under Char.

Lalah and Amuro Ray first met on Side 6, where Amuro found Lalah in front of a lakeside house. They spoke briefly and Amuro was attracted to her with his Newtype powers. They met again sometime later when Amuro's car got stuck in the mud. Another vehicle pulled over and offered to help him, aboard it was Lalah and Char Aznable, Amuro's archrival, the two had not yet seen each other face to face. Amuro immediately recognised both of them, but Char and Lalah had yet to figure out Amuro's identity.

Lalah left a profound impact on Amuro, and was considered his first great love. During the Elmeth's test run, which saw its Newtype "bits" weaponry wreak havoc on the Federal Fleet guarding the newly captured Zeon base Solomon, Amuro engaged the Elmeth in the Gundam but found out the pilot was Lalah. Both then realized they were soulmates and shared a "Newtype bonding", a sort of telepathic bond. Unfortunately Char arrived and chastised Lalah for "consorting with the enemy", and raised his beam naginata to strike down Amuro's wingman Sayla Mass, piloting the CoreBooster jet. Lalah told Char to stop, for she sensed the pilot was Char's sister Artesia. Char hesitated but this gave Amuro the opportunity to sever the weapon arm of Char's Gelgoog, incapacitating it. Amuro went for the killing blow, but Lalah knocked away Char and took the fatal strike. This has a profound effect on both men, as their rivalry escalates from a professional to a very personal one, which culminated in the movie Char's Counterattack.

Although she died before the end of the One Year War, Lalah Sune's spirit occasionally returns from beyond the grave to haunt both Char and Amuro Ray, as seen in Char's Counterattack.

=== Ramba Ral ===
Voiced by: Masashi Hirose (Japanese); John Payne (MSG), Michael McConnohie (MSG I-III), Kirk Thornton (Origin) (English)

Longtime friend of Zeon Zum Deikun, Ramba Ral (ランバ・ラル, Ranba Raru) took in Deikun's two children, Casval and Artesia, after Deikun was assassinated. In order to protect them, the Ral family later sent them to live on Earth under the names Edward and Sayla Mass. Ramba Ral joined the Zeon military in Universal Century 0064. He quickly made himself known as a great tactician, and a master of guerrilla warfare. Ramba Ral first made a name for himself as an ace pilot in the Zeon mobile suit forces during the Battle of Loum, where his impressive combat abilities and blue MS-04 Zaku I earned him the nickname Blue Giant (青き巨星, Aoki Kyosei). Ramba Ral is also sometimes referred to as the "Great Blue Star","guerrilla guy ral" or the "Blue Nova".

Ramba Ral stayed in space for the majority of the One Year War, however after the death of Garma Zabi during the pursuit of the Federation assault carrier White Base Ramba Ral is assigned to lead a Special Pursuit Force and is sent down to Earth on a Zanzibar mobile cruiser. Ramba Ral is ordered to avenge the death of Garma Zabi, and is given a new prototype ground-type mobile suit, the MS-07 Gouf, to do the job with. Soon after arriving on Earth, Ramba Ral decides to have a reconnaissance in force and attacks the White Base on an island in the North Pacific. Soon after gauging the attack strength of the warship and the Gundam, with guerrilla tactics, Ramba Ral retreats. The sheer power of Ramba Ral and his Gouf leave Gundam pilot Amuro Ray terrified. Traveling in a Gallop-Class Land Battleship, Ramba Ral continues to harass the White Base as it journeys across the vast deserts of Central Asia.

During the second attack on the White Base, Ramba Ral's wingmate Akos is killed, and Cozun is captured when his Zaku II is disabled and taken back on board the White Base by Amuro Ray piloting the Guncannon. When Cozun escapes from White Base's brig he contacts Ramba Ral and Ramba again attacks the White Base in his Gouf to conduct a rescue. However, Cozun is killed before he can safely escape and Ramba Ral's Gouf is disabled by the Gundam, forcing Ramba Ral to retreat. Not soon afterwards Ramba Ral meets Amuro Ray again (but did not recognize Amuro), who had deserted the White Base with the Gundam after dispute with the captain Bright Noa, and Fraw Bow (who came to drag Amuro back) in a small cafe in the desert town of Sodon. After recognizing Fraw Bow as a Federation soldier, Ramba Ral decides to release her and assigns his men to follow her back to the White Base. When Ramba Ral's forces pinpoint s location they launch a surprise attack using guerrilla tactics. Amuro sees the Zeon mobilizing to launch their attack and he decides to come back with the Gundam for rescue. Amuro attacks Ramba Ral's Gouf and the two slash each other's cockpits open, the two of them realizing that they had just met each other in the cafe. Amuro is able to destroy the Gouf, but Ramba Ral is able to escape by leaping out of the gash in the cockpit hatch and swinging out of the way of the explosion on a grappling hook he had attached to the Gundam's arm.

Following his defeat Ramba Ral is contacted by Dozle Zabi and told to contact M'Quve to receive support. However M'Quve refuses to supply Ramba Ral with the new Dom mobile suits he was instructed to give him. Realizing he is alone, Ramba decides that it is his duty as a soldier to do whatever he can to carry out his mission including the use of guerrilla tactics. While the Gallop and a Zaku II distract the White Base's mobile suits Ramba Ral and several of his soldiers attack the White Base in close-quarter hand-to-hand combat and successfully invade the ship. On board the ship Ramba Ral finds Sayla Mass and immediately recognizes her as Artesia Zum Deikun, and he tells her that he was a servant of her father. As Ramba Ral lets his guard down by talking he is shot by Ryu José, whom he also wounded. Wounded, Ramba Ral retreats into the White Base's secondary bridge and locks himself in. Captain Bright orders Amuro to destroy the secondary bridge, and Amuro tears a hole in the wall. Realizing he is trapped, Ramba Ral arms a grenade and leaps out of the hole, exploding in the Gundam's hand. Ramba Ral was killed in action on 5 November, Universal Century 0079.

=== Crowley Hamon ===
The elegant and attractive Crowley Hamon (クラウレ・ハモン, Kuraure Hamon) serves as an aide to Ramba Ral. Crowley is also Ramba Ral's lover and he affectionately refers to her as "Lady Hamon". Crowley Hamon mainly stays on the bridge of the Gallop and helps to coordinate Ramba Ral's attacks during battle. After Ramba Ral's death, Hamon decides to attack the White Base and comes close to destroying the Gundam. However, a wounded Ryu Jose crashes his Core Fighter into the Magella Top, killing them both. In the anime television series, Crowley Hamon is voiced by Yumi Nakatani in Japanese and Lenore Zann in English. In the anime film, she is voiced by Dian Andrews.

=== Black Tri-Stars ===
Composing of three veteran pilots, Gaia (ガイア), Ortega (オルテガ, Orutega), and Mash (マッシュ, Masshu), the Black Tri-Stars (黒い三連星, Kuroi Sanrensei) are one of Zeon's most famous group of ace pilots after Char Aznable. Prior to the beginning of the series, the Black Tri-Stars were responsible for the capture of Federation General Revil using their "Jetstream Attack." Prior to the Earth Federation's assault on Odessa, the Black Tri-Stars were sent to Earth to reinforce Zeon's defenses. Despite being equipped with new MS-09 Dom mobile suits, each of the Black Tri-Stars were defeated by Amuro and the Gundam, but not before they managed to kill Matilda Ajan.

=== Zabi Family ===
==== Degwin Sodo Zabi ====
Voiced by: Ichiro Nagai (Japanese); Eric Schneider (MSG) (English)

Degwin Sodo Zabi (デギン・ソド・ザビ, Degin Sodo Zabi) was formally one of Zeon Zum Deikun's trusted allies, but apparently masterminded Deikun's death and used the murder of his son Sasro to take over Zeon and establish it into a Principality to unite his people and achieves their ideals. However, Garma's death caused a despondent Degwin to gradually lose power to Gihren, who orchestrated his father's death when he attempted a final plea with the Federation's General Revil for peace.

==== Gihren Zabi ====
Voiced by: Banjo Ginga (Japanese); Doug Stone (MSG I-III), Hiro Kanagawa (MSG) Liam O'Brien (Origin) (English)

Gihren Zabi (ギレン・ザビ, Giren Zabi; also spelled Giren) is the oldest son of Degwin and the commander-in-chief of Zeon's Armed Forces. When his father withdraws from his duties as sovereign after Garma's death, he assumes control over the Principality's governance and effectively becomes its ruler in all but name. Thereafter, Gihren proceeds to tighten the Zabi family's grip on power by indoctrinating Zeon's people into believing they are a master race and enacting policies designed to purge the population of all those deemed socially undesirable. Disgusted by his son's warping of Deikun's ideals, Degwin warns Gihren that he is following in the footsteps of Adolf Hitler whose ambitions resulted in the destruction of himself and his country. After killing his father with the Solar Ray Cannon to prolong the war, Gihren is assassinated during the Battle of A Baoa Qu by Kycilia after admitting his act of patricide.

==== Sasro Zabi ====
Sasro Zabi, introduced in Gundam: The Origin, is the 2nd born son of Degwin, considered one of his family's prized members for being an adept manipulator of public opinion. This was shown by him using Deikun's death to stir anti-Federation propaganda among the Munzo citizens. Sasro was later killed in the same car explosion that scarred his young brother Dozle. This incident was apparently caused by Kycilia in retaliation for Sasro slapping her earlier for allowing Deikun's family to take refuge in the Ral household. Sasro's death ultimately enabled the Zabis' rise to power.

==== Dozle Zabi ====
Voiced by: Daisuke Gōri (Japanese, MSG, MSG I), Tesshō Genda (Japanese, MSG III, MSG I-III special edition), Kenta Miyake (Japanese, The Origin) (Japanese); French Tickner (English, MSG) and Peter Spellos (English, MSG I-III), Neil Kaplan (as Bob Johnson) (Origin) (English)

Dozle Zabi (ドズル・ザビ, Dozuru Zabi) is Degwin's third born son and Zeon's Space Attack Force Commander, tasked during the One Year War to move fleets to and from various points in space to secure victory. Tall and burly, his face scarred from the explosion that killed his brother Sasro, Dozle casts a fearsome appearance at first glance but he is actually one of the more likable of the Zabi family, as he a good man to his troops and devoted to his wife Zena and their baby daughter Mineva Lao Zabi. Dozle is closest to his younger brother Garma and actually looks forward to the day when Garma becomes an admiral in his own right. Dozle dismisses Char Aznable from his division, blaming him (though not suspecting him of foul play) for incompetence in the battle that resulted in Garma's death. Dozle especially despises his sister Kycilia and this feeling is only increased when she takes Char under her wing.

Dozle is revered by his troops in the Space Attack Force for personally leading them in battle. He and his bodyguard and close friend Shin Matsunaga were known to stage frontline "inspections" in his custom MS-06F Zaku II mobile suit, which typically became impromptu raids on nearby Earth Federation forces. Dozle's command center is located in the heart of the asteroid Solomon (later renamed Konpei Island by the Federation), and it is here that Dozle made his last stand. Late in UC0079 the Federation launched an offensive against Solomon, utilizing their remaining Salamis and Magellan class vessels.

When the Federation's Public class assault ships successfully deployed their beam dispersion smoke, Dozle ordered the mandatory evacuation of all non-essential personnel. At the same time the Federation deployed its first Solar System array at Solomon, which destroyed anything attempting to leave.

Dozle mounted his own mobile armour, the MA-08 Big Zam, and flew out to buy time for the evacuees, and shortly thereafter was engaged by the Federation's Gundam mobile suit. During battle his Big Zam's I-Field generator is disabled by a kamikaze attack from a core fighter, and his Big Zam is finally disabled by the Gundam. Dozle then exits the Big Zam's cockpit and fires a machinegun at the Gundam, causing Amuro to temporarily be stricken with fear and doubt. He was caught in the subsequent explosion of the Big Zam and killed. His death marked the beginning of the end for Zeon forces in space.

==== Kycilia Zabi ====
Voiced by: Mami Koyama (Japanese) (Japanese); Michelle Porter (MSG), Wendee Lee (Origin) (English)

Kycilia Zabi (キシリア・ザビ, Kishiria Zabi) is the only daughter of Degwin Sodo Zabi, who desires to be taken seriously, fiercely loyal to her people and subordinates yet an utterly merciless manipulator. Initially a security official in the Zeon homeland at the time of Zeon Zum Deikun's death, having her older brother Sasro Zabi killed for him slapping her over letting Deikun's children be sheltered by the Ral family, Kycilia is tasked with eliminating Deikun's family and loyalists. During the One War Year, placed in charge of Zeon's Mobile Suit Forces, Kycilia shows herself able to adapt to the changing technology while equally proficient in intelligence gathering, establishing numerous elite mobile suit units. She would later take Char Aznable under her wing, unaware that he is actually Casval Deikun, whom she assumed had been killed. During the Battle of A Baoa Qu, Kycilia took full command of Zeon after executing Gihren upon learning that he killed their father. Losing the support of Gihren's loyalists, Kycilia orders her remaining forces to fall back and ends up being killed when Char fires a rocket launcher at her through the window of her flagship Chimera, which the Federation warships destroyed moments after.

==== Garma Zabi ====
Voiced by: Katsuji Mori (Japanese); Brian Dobson (MSG), Chris Niosi (Origin) (English)

Garma Zabi (ガルマ・ザビ, Garuma Zabi) is the youngest son of Degwin Sodo Zabi, commander of Zeon forces in North America, and academy classmate and friend of Char Aznable. Garma first appears after Char forces the Federation ship White Base off course during reentry into Earth's atmosphere and into the heart of Zeon-controlled territory. Eager to prove himself to his older sister Kycilia, Garma pursues White Base with the apparent full support of Char, unaware of Char's treachery. In a last attempt to prevent White Base from escaping, Garma personally leads another attack to capture the Federation ship. However, Char intentionally misdirects the Zeon forces, allowing White Base to attack Garma's Gaw air carrier from behind. Shocked by Char's treachery, Garma turns the Gaw around and attempts to ram White Base, only to fall short. Garma's death sends shock waves though the Zeon forces, especially his father, Degwin Sodo, and older brother, Dozle. During Garma's state funeral, his eldest brother Gihren uses Garma's death as propaganda to rally the Zeon forces to continue fighting.

=== M'Quve ===
Voiced by: Kaneto Shiozawa (Japanese, MSG, MSG I-III), Masahiko Tanaka (Japanese, MSG I-III special edition), Takumi Yamazaki (Japanese, Gundam: The Origin) and Michael Benyaer (English)

M'Quve (マ・クベ, Ma Kube) is a colonel for the Zeon ground forces under the command of Kycilia Zabi and supervises mining operations and supplies for the war effort. Decadent and amoral, M'quve fancies crystal vases, which he collects, in particular a Song dynasty porcelain vase he acquired (which he intended to give to Kycilia Zabi as a present). He sees Char Aznable as somewhat of a rival and upstart. Upon destruction of his Odessa Base operating in Europe by the Earth Federation Forces, M'quve flees to space where he eventually meets the White Base and Amuro Ray's Gundam in battle at Texas Colony. There, M'quve pilots a melee-customized mobile suit, a prototype YMS-15 Gyan, and faces Amuro personally, only to be defeated and killed.
