= White Base =

Fictional vehicle from Mobile Suit Gundam

- First appearance: Mobile Suit Gundam Ep. #01, "Gundam Rising"

Information
- Affiliation: Earth Federation
- Launched: UC 0079
- Combat vehicles: RX-78-2 Gundam, RX-77 Guncannon, RX-75 Guntank; FF-X7 Core Fighter × 6, FF-X7-Bst Core Booster × 2
- Auxiliary vehicles: Gunperry transport plane × 1, launch shuttle × 2

General characteristics
- Class: Pegasus Assault carrier
- Registry: SCV-70
- Armaments: 580mm dual main cannon Dual-barrel mega-particle cannon × 2 Bow missile launcher × 24; Stern missile launcher × 6
- Defenses: Anti-aircraft machine gun × 36
- Maximum speed: Mach 12 (atmospheric flight)
- Propulsion: Thermonuclear rocket engine x 8, Minovsky Craft System
- Power: 404,525 kW / 550,000 hp
- Mass: 68,000 tons
- Length: 262 metres (860 ft)
- Width: 202.5 metres (664 ft)
- Height: 93 metres (305 ft)

The SCV-70 White Base (ホワイトベース Howaito Bēsu), also nicknamed Trojan Horse (木馬 Mokuba), is a fictional spaceship from the Japanese science fiction anime series Mobile Suit Gundam. It serves as the mothership of the protagonist Earth Federation crew members and the famous RX-78-2 Gundam mobile suit. Various spin-offs are designed after it, including a whole class of ships called the Pegasus-class assault carrier, and it has inspired ships in the sequels like the Argama-class in Mobile Suit Zeta Gundam and Archangel-class in Mobile Suit Gundam SEED.

Other non-Gundam spaceships, such as the transformed mode of Fortress Maximus from the Transformers series, are possibly also inspired by White Base's design.

== Development ==
The White Base is designed with a three-plane view method by Kunio Okawara, which originated as a salvaged design from the anime Invincible Steel Man Daitarn 3. The idea of having a space carrier from the director Yoshiyuki Tomino was partly inspired by the earlier science fiction anime Space Battleship Yamato, which he claimed to be a fan of. It was intended to be in a more realistic black colour, but was changed to white by the order of Sunrise, similar to the colour change of the main mecha Gundam from grey to white, red, blue and yellow. Tomino showed great disgust in the colour change, also noticing the unrealistic non-aerodynamic design of it after the show was on air, said in an interview that such a design would never appear in the real world, since it would be a sitting duck from fighter aircraft. Tomino still held a grudge 10 years after the show aired and stated in an interview in Newtype 1989 April issue that the imaginary enemies of Gundam are Sunrise, sponsors and television stations. This ship also appeared in the Kodansha Pocket Encyclopedia series, listed as spacecraft carrier (Uchuu Kubou, 宇宙空母). The Zukai Uchusen magazine listed it the 6th most recognisable fictional spaceship (and 3rd in anime) after the Imperial Star Destroyer, Millennium Falcon, Enterprise, SDF-1 Macross, and Yamato, and the ship that made the Pegasus-class of ships famous.

== Special onboard systems ==
As summarised for general readers, Chapter 4 of Zukai Uchusen, which is the chapter dedicated for famous fictional crafts, stated the White Base utilises Minovsky Physics to support a semi-antigravity system called Minovsky Craft to fly in the atmosphere, which it ejects Minovsky particles to create a kind of hovering effect.

== Fictional history ==
At the outbreak of the One Year War, the Dreadnought-oriented Earth Federation was caught completely by surprise when the Principality of Zeon deployed the agile mobile suits against their fleets. The Federation military quickly realised that they would also need mobile suits if they were to have any chance of victory, and instituted the famed Project V in order to develop a mass-production mobile suit design. The Federation also realised that their existing line of space warships — mostly the cannon-heavy Magellan-class battleships, Salamis-class cruisers, and the unarmed Columbus-class transporters — are severely lacking in mobile suit transport and support capacity, and thus desperately in need of designs capable of mobile warfare. A new revolutionary warship class exclusively designed for MS combat and support was born — the Pegasus-class assault carrier. One of the first Pegasus-class ships to enter active service was the White Base.

Launched in September UC 0079, White Base was immediately sent to retrieve the Federation's new mobile suit prototypes from Side 7's secret research facility for field testing. In the middle of this mission, she unexpectedly found herself tailed by a Zeon special combat unit led by Char Aznable. When the Zeon forces launched their surprise attack on the colony, heavy casualties were inflicted among the colony's civilian population and White Base's regular personnel. In the middle of the battle, civilian teenager Amuro Ray activated the RX-78-2 Gundam unit in sheer desperation and repulsed the Zeon attack, destroying two Zakus in the process. The surviving crew and the civilian refugees then boarded White Base and went on a long journey plagued by Zeon hostilities.

White Base first landed at Luna II, home of the remaining Earth Federation Space Force fleet, where she was promptly seized by the base commander, who proceeded to interrogate the crew, militia and civilian survivors on board. In the middle of this interrogation, Char, searching for White Base, led an infiltration attack on Luna II by mining the port entrance. White Base managed to escape from Luna II, and sailed next for Earth under the command of a hastily promoted young captain named Bright Noa.

Upon making contact with the Federation forces under the command of General Johann Abraham Revil, White Base was forced to push west through Zeon-controlled territory in North America and was drawn into a battle in the ruins of Seattle, where she shot down a Zeon Gaw-class carrier containing Zeon prince Garma Zabi (who was manoeuvred into an ambush by Char). White Base then crossed the Pacific Ocean to rendezvous with Revil's forces that were assembling for a major operation in Eastern Europe. Along the trek through Central Asia, she was hunted by another Zeon special forces unit under the command of Ramba Ral. Eventually regrouping with the Federation forces, White Base participated in Operation Odessa, the bloodiest Earth battle of the entire One Year War, helping to obliterate the main foothold of the Zeon invasion forces on Earth. She then restocked and refueled in Belfast before traveling across the Atlantic Ocean.

After the long route around the world, White Base finally arrived and docked at Jaburo, the Federation's main base and mobile suit manufacturing facility located underground in South America. Unfortunately, they ended up leading Char's Mad Angler unit to Jaburo, at which point he attempted an infiltration, which was repelled.

Following the failed Zeon raid on Jaburo, White Base was re-designated the 13th Autonomous Mobile Squadron, and re-launched into space to Side 6 in a diversionary move aimed at drawing off Zeon forces from Solomon. This mission would solidify her fame as Zeon's worst nightmare, as this single ship managed to surprise everyone by repeatedly knocking out heavyweight Zeon fleet commanders. Additionally, the unrivaled performance of Amuro Ray (including the widely televised Side 6 battle where he single-handedly shot down 9 Rick Doms within merely 3 minutes) earned the ship crew the nickname "Newtype Corps". With much of Zeon's attention being fixed on hunting down the "Trojan Horse", the Federation gained crucial strategic time to complete the deployment of its new Vinson Plan space armada, together with their new mass-produced RGM-79 GM. After destroying the Conscon Fleet, White Base rendezvoused with the remaining ships in the Earth Federation Space Force, and participated in the Battles of Solomon and A Baoa Qu.

During the pitched battle at A Baoa Qu, the Zeon supreme leader Gihren Zabi unleashed the Solar Ray, a gigantic colony laser superweapon, which wiped out a third of the Federation fleet and killed General Revil. White Base became a rally point for the surviving ships from Revil's fleet, and spearheaded the assault against A Baoa Qu's 5 defensive lines. During the battle, she sustained critical damage and was forced to crash-land into a space port of the asteroid stronghold, and immediately became a hotspot for hostile assaults. The grounded White Base was eventually destroyed from intense enemy attacks, although her entire surviving crew evacuated in time.

== See also ==
- One Year War
- Universal Century
