= Kōzō Shioya =

Japanese actor, voice actor and narrator (1955–2026)

- 塩屋 浩三
- Born: August 18, 1955; Kagoshima Prefecture, Japan
- Died: January 20, 2026 (aged 70)
- Occupations: Actor; voice actor; narrator
- Years active: 1966–2026
- Agent: Aoni Production
- Relatives: Yoku Shioya (brother)

Kōzō Shioya (塩屋 浩三, Shioya Kōzō; August 18, 1955 – January 20, 2026) was a Japanese actor, voice actor and narrator from Kagoshima Prefecture affiliated with Aoni Production.

He died of a cerebral hemorrhage on January 20, 2026, at the age of 70. His younger brother Yoku Shioya is also an actor and voice actor.

== Filmography ==
=== Television animation ===
1980s

- Mobile Suit Zeta Gundam (1985) (Roberto, Saegusa)
- Akumatō no Purinsu: Mitsume ga Tōru (1985) (Drunk)
- Blue Comet SPT Layzner (1985) (Manjuro)
- Mobile Suit Gundam ZZ (1986) (Mondo Agake)
- Dragon Ball (1986) (Suspicious Bird (episode 29), Panput's manager (episode 92))
- Ginga: Nagareboshi Gin (1986) (Chūtora, Jaguar)
- Transformers: Super-God Masterforce (1988) (Bullhorn)
- Ranma ½ (1989) (Oni)
- Dragon Ball Z (1989) (Majin Boo, Gurd, Universal Capsule Robot No. C6 (episode 9), Vodka (episode 174), Mō Kekkō (episode 290))

1990s

- Kyatto Ninden Teyandee (1990) (Inuyama Wankō-no-Kami)
- Magical Taruruto-kun (1990) (Great King Dowaha)
- Dragon Ball Z: Bardock – The Father of Goku (1990) (Totapo)
- The Brave Fighter of Sun Fighbird (1991) (Ace Baron, Thunder Baron/Thunder Jet)
- Future GPX Cyber Formula (1991) (Checker Sugimoto)
- The Brave Fighter of Legend Da-Garn (1992) (De Butcho)
- Nintama Rantarō (1993) (Dai-San-Kyōeimaru Hyōgo, Dai-Yon-Kyōeimaru Hyōgo)
- Slam Dunk (1993) (Kazushi Hasegawa, Nozomi Takamiya)
- Slayers (1995) (Noonsa)
- GeGeGe no Kitarō 4th series (1996) (Konaki-Jijii)
- Dragon Ball GT (1996) (Majin Boo)
- The King of Braves GaoGaiGar (1997) (Isamu Amami, Polonaise)

2000s

- One Piece (2000) (Genzo, Pappag, Edward Weevil)
- Kinnikuman II-Sei (2002) (Mayumi Kinniku)
- Mobile Suit Gundam SEED (2003) (Al Jairi)
- Futari wa Pretty Cure (2004) (Principal)
- Naruto (2005) (Jigumo)
- Yu-Gi-Oh! 5D's (Garome (episode 69))

2010s

- Digimon Xros Wars (2011) (Olegmon)
- Golden Time (2013) (Kōko's Father)
- Dragon Ball Kai (2014) (Majin Boo)
- World Trigger (2014) (Motokichi Kinuta)
- Dragon Ball Super (2015) (Majin Boo, Peru)
- GeGeGe no Kitarō 6th series (2018)(Tantanbō (ep. 3, 19), Kagami Jijii (ep. 8), Azuki Hakari (ep. 31)) (ep. 3, 8, 19, 31, )
- Tada Never Falls in Love (2018) (Villain″Reinbō Shōgun″) (ep. 3)
- Gakuen Basara (2018) (Xavi)

2020s

- The Millionaire Detective Balance: Unlimited (2020) (Yukihiro Kiyomizu)
- Digimon Adventure: (2021) (ShogunGekomon, Olegmon)
- Ragna Crimson (2023) (Temruogtaf)

=== Original video animation (OVA) ===
- Megazone 23 (1986) (Gutz)
- Yōma (1989) (Shiratsuyu)
- Legend of the Galactic Heroes (1988) (Fyodor Patrichev)

=== Theatrical animation ===
- Doraemon: Nobita and the Castle of the Undersea Devil (1983) (Mu Patrolling Crew Member)
- They Were Eleven (1986) (Dolph Tasta)
- NEMO (1989) (Oompe)
- Movie Fresh Pretty Cure! The Kingdom of Toys has Lots of Secrets!? (2009) (Toy Majin)
- Bleach: Hell Verse (2010) (Taikon)
- Pretty Cure All Stars DX3: Deliver the Future! The Rainbow-Colored Flower That Connects the World (2011) (Toy Majin)
- Dragon Ball Z: Battle of Gods (2013) (Majin Boo)
- Ghost in the Shell: The New Movie (2015) (Akiyama)
- Shimajiro in Bookland (2016) (Voice)

=== Video games ===
- Dragon Ball series (1994–2026) (Majin Boo)
- BS Nichibutsu Mahjong (????) (Manning Tanaka)
- BS Tantei Club: Yuki ni Kieta Kako (1997) (Shinnosuke Tachibana, Shintaro Tachibana, Jiro Kusano)
- Kingdom Hearts II (2005) (Chien-Po)
- Metal Gear Solid 2: Sons of Liberty (2001) (Fatman)
- Metal Gear Solid 3: Snake Eater (2004) (Nikita Khrushchev)
- Rockman X: Command Mission (2004) (Botos, Dr.Psyche)
- SatellaWalker (????) (Anda)
- SatellaWalker 2 (????) (Anda)
- Sengoku Basara (2005) (Imagawa Yoshimoto, Xavi)
- Sengoku Basara 2 (2006) (Imagawa Yoshimoto, Xavi)
- Sengoku Basara 2: Heroes (2007) (Imagawa Yoshimoto, Xavi)
- Tales of Hearts (2008) (Kornerupine)
- Sengoku Basara: Battle Heroes (2009) (Imagawa Yoshimoto, Xavi)
- Sengoku Basara: Chronicle Heroes (2011) (Imagawa Yoshimoto, Xavi)
- Return to PopoloCrois (2015) (Minister)

=== Tokusatsu ===
- Juukou B-Fighter (1995) (Synthetic Beast Ebiganya) (ep. 26)
- Ultraman Tiga (1996) (Alien Standel Abolbas) (ep. 17)
- Gekisou Sentai Carranger (1996) (YY Gonza) (ep. 8)
- Mirai Sentai Timeranger (2000) (Blackmailer Geymark) (ep. 12, 45)
- Hyakujuu Sentai Gaoranger (2001) (Vacuum cleaner Org) (ep. 15)
- Bakuryuu Sentai Abaranger (2003) (Blastasaur Parasarokkiro) (eps. 19 – 50)
- Bakuryū Sentai Abaranger DELUXE: Abare Summer is Freezing Cold! (2003) (Burstosaur Parasarokkiro)
- Bakuryū Sentai Abaranger vs. Hurricaneger (2004) (Burstosaur Parasarokkiro)
- Tokusou Sentai Dekaranger (2005) (Kulernian Jellyfis) (ep. 48 – 49)
- Tensou Sentai Goseiger (2010) (Daicaci Alien Yokubabanger of the Electric Shock) (ep. 11)
- Zyuden Sentai Kyoryuger (2013) (Debo Jakireen) (ep. 13)
- Shuriken Sentai Ninninger (2015) (Youkai Daidarabotchi) (ep. 10)
- Kaitou Sentai Lupinranger VS Keisatsu Sentai Patranger (2018) (Ryugu Tamatebacco) (ep. 28)

=== Dubbing ===
==== Live-action ====
- Oliver Platt
  - Indecent Proposal (Jeremy)
  - The Temp (Hartsell)
  - The Three Musketeers (1998 TV Asahi edition) (Porthos)
  - Bicentennial Man (2003 NTV edition) (Rupert Burns)
  - Pieces of April (Jim Burns)
- Alice in Wonderland (Nivens McTwisp the White Rabbit (Michael Sheen))
- Alice Through the Looking Glass (Nivens McTwisp the White Rabbit (Michael Sheen))
- Annie: A Royal Adventure! (Mean Murphy Knuckles (Perry Benson))
- Armageddon (2002 Fuji TV edition) (Max Lennert (Ken Hudson Campbell))
- Batman Begins (2007 NTV edition) (Arnold Flass (Mark Boone Junior))
- Brothers & Sisters (Dennis York (Peter Gerety))
- Catch Me If You Can (Earl Amdursky (Brian Howe))
- CJ7 (The Boss (Lam Chi-chung))
- Constantine (Father Hennessy (Pruitt Taylor Vince))
- Daddy Day Care (Phil Ryerson (Jeff Garlin))
- Die Hard with a Vengeance (Charles Weiss (Kevin Chamberlin))
- Envy (Nick Vanderpark (Jack Black))
- ER (Jerry Markovic (Abraham Benrubi))
- Exit Wounds (2004 NTV edition) (T. K. Johnson (Anthony Anderson))
- The Full Monty (Dave Horsefall (Mark Addy))
- Get Smart (2011 TV Asahi edition) (Larabee (David Koechner))
- Ghosts of Mars (James "Desolation" Williams (Ice Cube))
- The Invention of Lying (Marl Bellison (Ricky Gervais))
- The Lost World: Jurassic Park (Dr. Robert Burke (Thomas F. Duffy))
- Paul Blart: Mall Cop (Paul Blart (Kevin James))
- Paul Blart: Mall Cop 2 (Paul Blart (Kevin James))
- Red Planet (Dr. Quinn Burchenal (Tom Sizemore))
- Rise of the Planet of the Apes (Robert Franklin (Tyler Labine))
- Saving Private Ryan (Sergeant Horvath (Tom Sizemore))
- She-Wolf of London (Charles)
- Shaolin Soccer (Light Weight Vest (Lam Chi-chung))
- Simon Sez (Micro (John Pinette))
- Skiptrace (Yung (Eric Tsang))
- Spin City (Paul Lassiter (Richard Kind))
- True Memoirs of an International Assassin (Netflix edition) (Sam Larson (Kevin James))

==== Animation ====
- The Pirates Who Don't Do Anything: A VeggieTales Movie (George (Pa Grape))
- Maya & Miguel (Madonaldo)
- Mulan (Chien Po)
- Mulan II (Chien Po)
- Penguins of Madagascar (King Julien XIII)
- Sonic SatAM (Rotor Walrus)
- Thomas the Tank Engine and Friends (Duck (Season 2–7), Murdoch (Season 7), Kelly, Lorry 3, Jem Cole (Season 2) and additional voices (Season 1–7))
