= List of Mobile Suit Gundam ZZ characters =

This is a list of fictional characters from the Japanese science fiction anime television series Mobile Suit Gundam ZZ. Mobile Suit Gundam ZZ picks up where Mobile Suit Zeta Gundam left off with Haman Khan, regent to Mineva Lao Zabi, planning an invasion of Earth. It continues to follow Bright Noah and the ship Argama as well as introduce several new characters.

== Protagonists ==
=== AEUG ===
Judau Ashta (ジュドー・アーシタ, Judō Āshita)
Voiced by: Kazuki Yao (Japanese); Darren Pleavin (English, TV series Animax dub), Sean Broadhurst (English, Dynasty Warriors Gundam), Andrew Francis (English; Dynasty Warriors Gundam 2, Dynasty Warriors Gundam 3) (English)
A 14-year-old boy from the Shangri-La colony. During the final battle with Paptimus Scirocco, Kamille Bidan, the hero from Mobile Suit Zeta Gundam, was placed into a vegetable-like state after crashing the MSZ-006 Zeta Gundam into Scirocco's mobile suit PMX-003 The O. This left the problem aboard the Argama (the main AEUG ship of the show) with no central Gundam pilot for the ship. After the Argama docks at the Side 1 colony of Shangri-La, Judau attempts twice to steal the Zeta Gundam but each time he's caught and forced to return the suit. Eventually, Judau becomes a member of the Argama's crew and the new pilot for the MSZ-006 Zeta Gundam. Notably, his group of rag-tag OutworldShangri-La friends included the bossy Beecha Oleg, Beecha's side-kick Mondo Agake, the timid Iino Abbav. Judau has had numerous female characters around him. Elle Vianno, who was not afraid to make herself clear and later the crew is joined by Anaheim Electronics/AEUG pilot, Roux Louka. As events progress, Judau receives the MSZ-010 Double Zeta Gundam from Anaheim Electronics to more effectively combat the threat of Axis and its new army. Judau uses the ZZ Gundam to great effect throughout the series. Eventually he uses the Double Zeta to defeat Axis Leader Haman Karn in a duel. In an early battle, before Axis declares itself Neo Zeon, Judau's younger sister, Leina Ashta, is captured by Glemmy Toto. Glemmy is enthralled by Leina and spends most of the time teaching her 'civilized' customs, such as ballet, musical instruments, and being a 'lady', to pose a greater image of the Zeon movement. Because of this, a great deal of the series deals with Judau trying to find his sister. At one point, when Neo Zeon forces occupy the Federation Assembly at Dakar, Leina manages to escape from her captivity. Unfortunately, Leina and Judau met up with Haman, who injures Leina during a shooting. When Judau takes Leina to a cabin to rest, he's suddenly caught up in a mobile suit battle, and one of the damaged mobile suits crashes into the cabin. Judau thinks that Leina had perished, but later found out that Leina had escaped, and was rescued by former White Base pilot, Sayla Mass. Falsely thinking his sister is dead the incident leaves Judau depressed and detached from reality. During the closing months of the first Neo Zeon movement, Judau became convinced that Leina was still alive. While the rest of the crew figured he was delusional and refused to accept the truth, it was his Newtype intuitions that proved him to be true. At the end of the series Judau is reunited with his sister and leaves with Roux to go to the planet Jupiter. In the Gundam Evolve 10 animated short, Judau is assigned to protect/escort the space transport ship Jupitris on his birthday. While on the recovery missions he encounters Neo Zeon forces pursuing an AMX-004-3 Quebeley MK.II. Seeing the Quebeley posing no threat, Judau assists it in destroying the Neo Zeon squad composed of Doven Wolfs riding on sub-flight platforms, allowing the Quebeley to land safely on Jupitris. The last scene seems to reveal that the Quebeley was piloted by someone whose pilot suit resembles the one belonging to Ple Two.

Iino Abbav (イーノ・アッバーブ, Īno Abbābu)
Voiced by: Masami Kikuchi

Elle Viano (エル・ビアンノ, Eru Bianno)
Voiced by: Eriko Hara (Japanese); (English)

Beecha Oleg (ビーチャ・オーレグ, Bīcha Ōregu)
Voiced by: Shingo Hiromori (Japanese); Russell Wait (English, TV series Animax dub), Jordan Schartner (English, Dynasty Warriors Gundam games) (English)
A friend of Judau who acts as the leader for their Junk Collector group. After joining the AUEG, Beecha at first did not have much faith in the group and tried numerous times with his partner Mondo to prove their loyalty to the Zeon. Eventually the two were allowed to join the crew of the Endra, but after being horribly mistreated and given menial jobs the two escaped to re-join the AEUG, though they failed to take Leina Ashta with them. Afterward Beecha proved his strengthened loyalty to the AUEG by serving as a mobile suit pilot for the repaired Hyaku Shiki. After the group acquired the Nahel Argama, Beecha served as its acting captain for the remainder of the war and then returned to civilian life.

Mondo Agake (モンド・アガケ, Mondo Agake)
Voiced by: Kōzō Shioya

Roux Louka (ルー・ルカ, Rū Ruka)
Voiced by: Naoko Matsui (Japanese); Andrea Kwan (English, TV series Animax dub), Kelly Sheridan (English, Dynasty Warriors Gundam games) (English)

An A.E.U.G. recruit serving on the Argama, Roux Louka becomes the pilot of Zeta Gundam when Judau Ashta changes over to the ZZ Gundam. A regular soldier and older than Judau and his counterparts, her patronizing attitude towards them initially causes friction, but eventually an unfaltering bond of trust forms between them. Despite feelings enemy pilot Glemy Toto has for her, Roux kills him in their final confrontation. After the war she joins the Jupiter Fleet along with Judau.

Elpeo Ple (エルピー・プル, Erupī Puru)
Voiced by: Chieko Honda (Japanese); Caitlynne Medrek (English; Dynasty Warriors: Gundam, Dynasty Warriors: Gundam 2), Wendy Morrison (English, Dynasty Warriors: Gundam 3) (English)
Elpeo Ple is an artificially enhanced Newtype, who first appears fighting for Neo-Zeon under Glemy Toto. She pilots the AMX-004-2 Qubeley Mk.II. Her name is a pun on the title of a Japanese hentai magazine, Lemon People, which was popularly referred to as "L People" (エル・ピープル, Eru Pīpuru). This is the reason behind the discrepancy between her English name of "Elpeo Ple," as given in official Japanese sources, and its actual pronunciation within the series. After an encounter with ZZ Gundam's Newtype pilot, Judau Ashta, she becomes obsessed with him, referring to him as "big brother". Because of her attachment to Judau she leaves Neo-Zeon to join the AEUG aboard the Argama. Aboard the Argama she is seen as troublesome by the ship's crew, constantly wanting to be with Judau. She dies protecting Judau from Ple Two (Ple Two) who is piloting the MRX-009 Psyco Gundam Mk. II. Her Newtype "spirit" remains influential however, convincing Ple Two during the Battle of Axis to stop fighting Judau, which in turn leads to the death of Glemy Toto and her clone to join Judau and his friends.

Bright Noa (ブライト・ノア, Buraito Noa)
Voiced by: Hirotaka Suzuoki (Japanese); Darren Pleavin (English, TV series Animax dub), Chris Kalhoon (English; Dynasty Warriors Gundam games) (English)

Former captain of White Base during the One Year War and one of the sole experienced military commander within the ranks of AEUG leaders after their costly final battle during the Gryps Conflict. He continues to serve the same role he played in the previous Gundam shows as captain of the Argama, the same ship that he commanded in the fight against the Titans. After the Axis Zeon are defeated, the AEUG forces are integrated back with the Earth Federation, and Bright gets re-instated as an officer of the Earth Federation with the rank of Captain.

Torres (トーレス, Tooresu)
Voiced by: Kenta Abe (Japanese); Roger Rhodes (English, Dynasty Warriors Gundam games) (English)

Hayato Kobayashi (ハヤト・コバヤシ, Hayato Kobayashi)
Voiced by: Kiyonobu Suzuki (Japanese); Chris Ippolito (English, Dynasty Warriors Gundam games) (English)

Hayato Kobayashi is a former crew member of the White Base during the One Year War. He is now owner of the Kennedy Space Museum and leader of the Earth-based anti-Titans group, Karaba. His adoptive son, Katz Kobayashi, was killed during the final battle that took place in Zeta Gundam. He pays a visit to his son's quarters on board the Argama before he goes out into battle and is killed by a Zaku III piloted by Neo Zeon ace Rakan Dahkaran, while assisting the AEUG in an attempt to rescue the civilians of Dublin when the Neo Zeon had targeted the city with a Colony Drop.

Kamille Bidan (カミーユ・ビダン, Kamīyu Bidan)
Voiced by: Nobuo Tobita (Japanese); Travis Milne (English; Dynasty Warriors: Gundam, Dynasty Warriors: Gundam 2); James Beach (English; Dynasty Warriors: Gundam 3) (English)

The AEUG's top mobile suit pilot during their last conflict with the Titans. Throughout most of the series, he remains comatose as a result of a crippling blow from his late adversary Paptimus Scirocco. Near the end of the series, Kamille awakens and again displays the most powerful Newtype abilities, such as telepathically talking to Judau and his crew, much like Amuro Ray did with the White Base crew during the One Year War. Despite this, he is still noticeably under some influence of the attack. Kamille is never shown again to pilot a mobile suit. By the end of Mobile Suit Gundam ZZ, Kamille has apparently recovered his mental faculties and may have found a chance for a peaceful life along with his childhood friend and love interest, Fa Yuiry. They are last seen in the epilogue of ZZ Gundam running along a beach.

Fa Yuiry (ファ・ユイリィ, Fa Yuirī)
Voiced by: Miyuki Matsuoka (Japanese); Angie Beers (English, Dynasty Warriors Gundam games) (English)

After the Gryps Conflict, Fa spent most of her time providing tender care to her beloved boyfriend Kamille, who was psychologically crippled from his final fight with Scirocco (her dedication to Kamille was such that the Haman-crazed Mashymre Cello was impressed enough to describe her as "Lady Angel"). Fa initially continued her duties as an active member on the Argama, but later chose to retire to be with Kamille on Shangri-La following the Argama's departure after her Methuss was disabled in combat to save Judau Ashta (who rushed out in Zeta Gundam with an unloaded beam rifle) from Mashymre's Hamma Hamma mobile suit. She did not reappear until later in the show, where she was seen working in Dublin as a nurse while still taking care of the mentally incapacitated Kamille. Fa reunites with the Argama crew when they visited Dublin to seek psychiatric assessment for Elpeo Ple, and she appeared in time to rescue Judau and Bright, who were under confinement by the local authority, from a burning basement when Neo Zeon attacked on the Federation building. In the epilogue of the series, Kamille recovers his mental faculties and lives peacefully with Fa, and they are last seen running along a beach together.

== Antagonists ==
=== Neo-Zeon (Axis) ===
Haman Karn (ハマーン・カーン, Hamān Kān)
Voiced by: Yoshiko Sakakibara (Japanese); Andrea Kwan (English, TV series Animax dub), Tracy Sutton (English; video games) (English)

After defeating Char, Haman planned to move in and conquer Earth. However, she first had to eliminate the AEUG, since they drained potential support from spacenoids. During this time, she met Judau Ashta, and developed feelings for him, possibly due to his powers and possibly because he reminded her of a younger version of herself. She tried to persuade him to join her but he rebuffed her. During their encounter in Dakar, Haman accidentally injured Leina, causing Judau to become enraged. The ensuing pressure terrified Haman, driving her to leave. She also ordered a colony drop on Dublin; though the AEUG was able to evacuate some people, most of the population died. Eventually, Glemmy Toto initiated a civil war just as she was on the verge of triumph. Haman won, but the war gave the Earth forces precious time to regroup. Haman and Judau faced off in a final battle, during which both incapacitated the other. Despite Judau's entreaties, Haman ultimately committed suicide, her last words expressing happiness that she had met someone as good as Judau.

Mineva Lao Zabi (ミネバ・ラオ・ザビ, Mineba Rao Zabi)
Voiced by: Miki Itō

Mashymre Cello (マシュマー・セロ, Mashumā Sero)
Voiced by: Kenyu Horiuchi (Japanese); Russell Wait (English)
The captain of the Neo Zeon ship "The Endora". He is always seen wearing a flower that Haman Khan gave to him, as he is borderline obsessed with her. Mashymre is depicted as possessing strong newtype abilities. He is the primary antagonist at the beginning of the series, however a series of defeats at the hands of Judau Ashta and the AEUG result in control of the Endora to be handed over to Chara Soon.He does not appear again until the colony drop on Dublin, for which he is responsible. Although still dedicated to Haman, by this point he has largely abandoned his pacifistic and idealistic concepts (although comments by other characters suggest this may be the result of psychological conditioning and/or attempts to turn him into an artificial newtype), and has adapted a colder, more destitute outlook towards battle. He fights for Haman at the Battle of Axis against the rebel forces of Glemy Toto. Mashymre dies while fighting Rakan Dahkaran and his Doven Wolf team during the Battle of Axis. After displaying an impressive amount of newtype powers he detonates his mobile suit.

Chara Soon (キャラ・スーン, Kyara Sūn)
Voiced by: Hazuki Monma (Japanese, as "Hazuki Kadoma") (Japanese); Candice Moore (English)
A female commander that has an unstable personality. Chara's mood swings are so constant that she sometimes goes out of control in a mobile suit battle. Chara first appeared in the series as an observer for Mashymre Cello and was later assigned to replace him as the Endra's captain due to his constant failures against the Argama. After being captured by the AEUG, Chara was forced to serve as a cleaning lady much too her disgust under the watch of the two children Shinta and Qum until she was able to escape. Chara later returns around the end of the series having apparently becoming a cyber-Newtype and later fights alongside Haman's forces against Glemy's forces where she ultimately dies in a newtype flash and taking a number of Qubeley Mk. II units down with her.

Glemy Toto (グレミー・トト, Guremī Toto)
Voiced by: Tsutomu Kashiwakura|Jordan Schartner (English, Dynasty Warriors Gundam games)

Gottn Goh (ゴットン・ゴー, Gotton Goo)
Voiced by: Kōji Totani

Rakan Dahkaran (ラカン・ダカラン, Rakan Dakaran)
Voiced by: Ryunosuke Obayashi

Ple Two (プルツー, Purutsū)
Voiced by: Chieko Honda (Japanese); Katie Rowan (English, Dynasty Warriors Gundam games) (English)

== Other characters ==
Leina Ashta (リィナ・アーシタ, Ryina āshita)
Voiced by: Maya Okamoto (Japanese); Andrea Kwan (English, TV series Animax dub); Nicole Bouma (English, Dynasty Warriors Gundam games) (English)

Shinta (シンタ, Shinta)
Voiced by: Chika Sakamoto

Qum (クム, Kum)
Voiced by: Mayumi Shō

Sayla Mass (セイラ・マス, Seira Masu)
Voiced by: Yō Inoue (Japanese) (Japanese); Candice Moore (English)

Yazan Gable (ヤザン・ゲーブル, Yazan Gēburu)
Voiced by: Hōchū Ōtsuka (Japanese); Ryan Ballantine (English, Dynasty Warriors Gundam games) (English)
Several days after the Battle of Gryps ended, Yazan's escape pod was recovered at Shangri-La Colony by Judau Ashta and his gang. Yazan then attempted and succeeded in coercing them into stealing the Zeta Gundam. Over the next several days Yazan made several attempts to steal the Zeta and failed each time. In the end, the Zeta and the Argama escaped the colony and Yazan is last seen attempting to escape by parachuting with a jacket. In a later episode, he is seen in a cameo appearance during a black tie dinner party on Earth.
