= List of Mobile Suit Zeta Gundam episodes =

Cover of the second Japanese Original Remastered Blu-ray boxset by Bandai Visual.

Mobile Suit Zeta Gundam is a 1985 Japanese science fiction anime television series created and directed by Yoshiyuki Tomino and produced by Nagoya Broadcasting Network, Sotsu Agency, and Sunrise. Mobile Suit Zeta Gundam is the sequel to the 1979 Japanese science fiction series Mobile Suit Gundam. The series premiered in Japan on Nagoya Broadcasting Network on March 2, 1985, and spanned 50 episodes to February 22, 1986. The English adaptation was released direct to DVD in the United States.

Three pieces of theme music are used over the course of the series—two opening themes and one closing theme. For the first twenty-three episodes, the opening theme is "Zeta - Transcending Times" (Z・刻をこえて, Zeta - Toki o Koete) by Mami Ayukawa. For the remaining twenty-seven episodes, the opening theme is "From the Aqueous Star with Love" (水の星へ愛をこめて, Mizu no Hoshi e Ai o Komete) by Hiroko Moriguchi. The closing theme is "Believe in the Starry Sky" (星空のBelieve, Hoshizora no Believe) by Mami Ayukawa. For the North American release, the opening and closing themes were changed to "Zeta's Pulse ~ Zeta Gundam" (Ζの鼓動～Ζガンダム, Zeta no Kodō ~ Zeta Gundam) for the opening theme and "Boy from Green Noa ~ A New World" (グリーン・ノアの少年～新たな世界, Gurīn Noa no Shōnen ~ Arata na Sekai) for the closing theme, both by Shigeaki Saegusa. Songs composed by Neil Sedaka were adapted for the series Mobile Suit Zeta Gundam. These included the two opening themes "Zeta - Toki wo Koete" (originally in English as "Better Days are Coming") and "Mizu no Hoshi e Ai wo Komete" (originally in English as "For Us to Decide", but the English version was never recorded), as well as the end theme "Hoshizora no Believe" (written as "Bad and Beautiful"). Due to copyright, the songs were replaced for the North American DVD.

== Episode list ==
No.	Title	Directed by	Written by	Original release date
1	"The Black Gundam"; Transliteration: "Kuroi Gandamu" (Japanese: 黒いガンダム)	Yasuhiro Imagawa	Hiroshi Ōnogi; Yoshiyuki Tomino	March 2, 1985
AEUG member Quattro Bajeena infiltrates the colony where civilian Kamille Bidan lives, searching for the Earth Federation's new Gundam. Kamille gets into trouble with Jerid Messa of the Titans while on his way to take a look at Bright Noa's current ship.
2	"Departure"; Transliteration: "Tabidachi" (Japanese: 旅立ち)	Osamu Sekita	Yumiko Suzuki; Yoshiyuki Tomino	March 9, 1985
The Titans believe that Quattro is the Red Comet. Kamille steals one of the three new Gundams and escapes with him. Bright challenges Bask Om about running military tests in civilian colonies but the Titan Kacricon Cacooler doesn't have respect for Bright.
3	"Inside the Capsule"; Transliteration: "Kapuseru no Naka" (Japanese: カプセルの中)	Hiroyuki Yokoyama	Tomoko Kawasaki; Yoshiyuki Tomino	March 16, 1985
Commander Jamaicon kidnaps Kamille's parents to use as hostages for an exchange with the stolen Gundams. Titan Emma Sheen delivers a ransom letter to the AEUG ship while Jerid is given a mission to shoot a capsule containing a bomb if any rescue attempt is made.
4	"Emma's Decision"; Transliteration: "Ema no Dassō" (Japanese: エマの脱走)	Toshifumi Kawase	Miho Maruo; Yoshiyuki Tomino	March 23, 1985
Jerid and Kamille fight in their Mobile Suits while Emma attempts to stop the battle. Bask tasks Emma with stealing the AEUG's new mobile suits, but she frees Kamille's father and takes the Gundams back to the AEUG instead.
5	"Father and Son"; Transliteration: "Chichi to Ko to..." (Japanese: 父と子と・・・)	Kunihisa Sugishima	Hiroshi Ōnogi; Yoshiyuki Tomino	March 30, 1985
Bask returns to the commandeered colony and turns over the Titan's operation to Jamaican. Kamille's father steals the AEUG's Mobile Suit in an attempt to give it to the Titans. Quattro chases after him while AEUG Commander Henken uses the Argama to help in the battle. Henken believes that Quattro is Char Aznable.
6	"To Earth"; Transliteration: "Chikyūken e" (Japanese: 地球圏へ)	Osamu Sekita	Yumiko Suzuki; Yoshiyuki Tomino	April 6, 1985
The Titans' ship Alexandria continues to follow the AEUG ships Argama and Mont Blanc. The AEUG hold off an attack by Jerid and Lila Milla Rira while AEUG member Reccoa Londe leaves on a classified mission to Earth.
7	"Escape from Side One"; Transliteration: "Saido Wan no Dasshutsu" (Japanese: サイド1の脱出)	Hiroyuki Yokoyama	Miho Maruo; Yoshiyuki Tomino	April 13, 1985
AEUG leader Blex Forer offers Kamille a chance to join as an AEUG member. The ship heads for Colony 30 where 3,000,000 protesters were gassed to death. Lila chases Kamille into the colony.
8	"The Dark Side of the Moon"; Transliteration: "Tsuki no Uragawa" (Japanese: 月の裏側)	Toshifumi Kawase	Hiroshi Ōnogi; Yoshiyuki Tomino	April 20, 1985
The AEUG's Argama and the Titans' Alexandria both arrive at the Moon. Jerid and Kamille battle in their Mobile Suits. Quattro meets with Wong Lee, the financial supporter of AEUG and owner of the Mobile Suit manufacturing company, Anaheim Electronics.
9	"A New Bond"; Transliteration: "Atarashii Kizuna" (Japanese: 新しい絆)	Kunihisa Sugishima	Miho Maruo; Yoshiyuki Tomino	April 27, 1985
Reccoa attempts to infiltrate the Federation base at Jaburo and meets Kai Shiden. On the Moon, Anaheim gives new Mobile Suits to both the AEUG and the Titans. Quattro, Apolly, Roberto and Kamille attempt to steal the Titans' new suits at Granada but Kacricon is ready to defend them.
10	"Reunion"; Transliteration: "Saikai" (Japanese: 再会)	Osamu Sekita	Hiroshi Ōnogi; Yoshiyuki Tomino	May 4, 1985
The Alexandria destroys the AEUG's Moon base, but the Argama and the new AEUG ship Radish escape and head to Earth. The AEUG ships pick up a distress call from Bright Noa's shuttle, currently under attack from a pilot named Paptimus Scirocco.
11	"Entering the Atmosphere"; Transliteration: "Taikiken Totsunyū" (Japanese: 大気圏突入)	Hiroyuki Yokohama	Yumiko Suzuki; Yoshiyuki Tomino	May 11, 1985
Henken promotes Bright to Captain of the Argama and leaves for the Moon as the AEUG fleet heads for Earth. Scirocco believes he can stop the AEUG at Earth, and he, Jerid, and Kacricon attack Emma, Kamille, and Quattro as they descend through the atmosphere as the danger of burning up completely becomes more real.
12	"The Winds of Jaburo"; Transliteration: "Jaburō no Kaze" (Japanese: ジャブローの風)	Toshifumi Kawase	Yasushi Hirano; Yoshiyuki Tomino	May 25, 1985
Reccoa and Kai attempt to escape their prison cell. Quattro is suspicious of Jaburo's light defenses, and Apolly learns that a nuclear bomb is planted on the base. With no possible way to defuse the bomb, everyone scrambles to escape the base before it detonates.
13	"Shuttle Launch"; Transliteration: "Shatoru Hasshin" (Japanese: シャトル発進)	Kunihisa Sugishima	Hiroshi Ōnogi; Yoshiyuki Tomino	June 1, 1985
Karaba member Hayato Kobayashi pilots the airship Audhumla to meet up with the AEUG forces at Kennedy Spaceport. Kai informs Hayato that Quattro is indeed Char. Apolly attempts to launch an ancient Space Shuttle to evacuate the Jaburo escapees to the Argama.
14	"Amuro Flies Again"; Transliteration: "Amuro Futatabi" (Japanese: アムロ再び)	Yasuhiro Imagawa	Yumiko Suzuki; Yoshiyuki Tomino	June 8, 1985
The Titans' airship Sudori pursues the Audhumla. Amuro Ray and Katz escape from Federation spies that have been keeping an eye on Amuro since the One Year War and join up with Karaba. Cyber Newtype Rosamia Badam attacks the Karaba ship, and Amuro aids in the battle. Char and Amuro meet for the first time since their battle at A Baoa Qu.
15	"Katz's Sortie"; Transliteration: "Katsu no Shutsugeki" (Japanese: カツの出撃)	Osamu Sekita	Miho Maruo; Yoshiyuki Tomino	June 15, 1985
Amuro learns that Hayato intended for Amuro and Katz to join him. Beltorchika Irma arrives on the Audhumla. The Sudori chases the ship over San Francisco and Rosamia heads out to attack. Katz steals the Gundam to fight Rosamia and Kamille and Char head out to defend him.
16	"Through the Haze of Darkness"; Transliteration: "Shiroi Yami o Nukete" (Japanese: 白い闇を抜けて)	Takaō Motohashi	Yumiko Suzuki; Yoshiyuki Tomino	June 22, 1985
The Audhumla heads for a base covered in heavy fog where a shuttle is waiting to transport Char, Kamille, and Katz back to the Argama but the Sudori launches an attack. Katz convinces Char to leave for space with him while the rest escape back to the airship. Another letter from Kai gives Hayato his next move.
17	"Hong Kong City"; Transliteration: "Hon Kon Shiti" (Japanese: ホンコン・シティ)	Toshifumi Kawase	Akinori Endō	June 29, 1985
The Sudori gets reinforcements with the Psyco Gundam and pilot Four Murasame. Hayato and the Karaba attempt to meet up with Kai's contact in Hong Kong. Kamille fights the Psycho Gundam in an attempt to stop the destruction of the city.
18	"Mirai Captured"; Transliteration: "Torawareta Mirai" (Japanese: とらわれたミライ)	Kunihisa Sugishima	Yumiko Suzuki; Yoshiyuki Tomino	July 6, 1985
Four and Kamille meet each other in person and begin to understand each other. Ben Wooder of the Sudori takes Mirai hostage and plans to keep attacking Hong Kong until the Audhumla surrenders. Amuro offers himself as an exchange for Mirai, and Kamille helps hold off the attack during the rescue attempt.
19	"Cinderella Four"; Transliteration: "Shinderera Fō" (Japanese: シンデレラ・フォウ)	Jun Hirabayashi	Akinori Endō	July 13, 1985
Kamille learns that Four doesn't have any memories and they share a kiss. The Audhumla prepares to leave Hong Kong while Ben Wooder attempts to pilot the Psyco Gundam. Four takes over piloting and Kamille and Amuro fight against her.
20	"The Heated Escape"; Transliteration: "Shakunetsu no Dasshutsu" (Japanese: 灼熱の脱出)	Osamu Sekita	Akinori Endō	July 20, 1985
Hayato plans to attack the Titans' base in New Guinea to steal a shuttle for Kamille and Amuro to return to space, as the Argama has returned to Earth orbit. The Psyco Gundam continues in its pursuit of the Audhumla, but Four soon turns on Wooder and the Sudori to help Kamille return to space.
21	"A Sign of Zeta"; Transliteration: "Zēta no Kodō" (Japanese: ゼータの鼓動)	Takaō Motohashi	Hiroshi Ōnogi; Yoshiyuki Tomino	July 27, 1985
The Titans move towards the Moon to take over Von Braun City. Scircco has pledged his loyalty to Jamitov Hymem and has provided new suits to Jerid and a pilot named Mouar Pharaoh. Kamille and Emma battle the new Mobile Suits and are no match until Fa Yuiry shows up in a ship along with Apolly piloting the now completed Zeta Gundam.
22	"The Eyes of Scirocco"; Transliteration: "Shirokko no Me" (Japanese: シロッコの眼)	Toshifumi Kawase	Miho Maruo; Yoshiyuki Tomino	August 3, 1985
Scirocco plans his next move on his ship, the Dogosse Gier, and introduces Jerid to two Newtypes, Sarah Zabiarov and Siddeley. Kamille, Emma, Apolly, and Fa attempt to hold off their attack while Reccoa transfers new Mobile Suits to the Argama.
23	"Moon Attack"; Transliteration: "Mūn Atakku" (Japanese: ムーン・アタック)	Kunihisa Sugishima	Yumiko Suzuki; Yoshiyuki Tomino	August 10, 1985
The Dogosse Gier and Alexandria plan to attack Von Braun City and convert it to a base for the Titans. Jamaicon lets Scirocco coordinate the attack and uses him as a shield. Char, Kamille, Fa, and Emma and the crews of the Radish and Argama defend the city.
24	"Counterattack"; Transliteration: "Hangeki" (Japanese: 反撃)	Osamu Sekita	Akinori Endō	August 17, 1985
Char and Blex leave for Earth and the city of Dakar where the Federation Council plans to give full control of the Federation to Jamitov and the Titans. Char finds Blex has been shot when he returns to the hotel room and he is given command of the AEUG. Jerid and Mouar join the Alexandria because Scirocco has left, and pilot Yazan Gable attacks the Argama.
25	"Colony Drop"; Transliteration: "Koronī ga Ochiru Hi" (Japanese: コロニーが落ちる日)	Jun Hirabayashi	Yumiko Suzuki	August 24, 1985
Jamaicon plans to drop a Colony on to the base at Granada. Sarah informs the AEUG, and Kamille believes it is because of Scirocco. Katz frees Sarah and she escapes. Mobile Suits are launched from the AEUG ships and Kamille, Apolly, Emma, Reccoa, and Katz battle with Yazan, Sarah and the others. The mayor of Granada wants to evacuate but Wong Lee is sure the AEUG will be successful.
26	"The Ghost of Zeon"; Transliteration: "Jion no Bōrei" (Japanese: ジオンの亡霊)	Takaō Motohashi	Akinori Endō	August 31, 1985
Jamaicon wants to return to Gryps but Yazan has a new plan. Fighting breaks out between the AEUG and Titans forces near a derelict Zeon ship. The Alexandria engages in battle with the Argama and Radish and Jamaicon is caught in the crossfire. Kamille, Katz, and Emma continue to battle with Yazan.
27	"Rendezvous with Char"; Transliteration: "Shaa no Kikan" (Japanese: シャアの帰還)	Toshifumi Kawase	Yumiko Suzuki; Yoshiyuki Tomino	September 7, 1985
The Alexandria heads for Earth while Char returns to space in a shuttle with children Shinta and Qum. Kamille and the others defend the shuttle from attack by Jerid and Yazan.
28	"The Jupitris Infiltration"; Transliteration: "Jupitorisu Sennyū" (Japanese: ジュピトリス潜入)	Osamu Sekita	Akinori Endō	September 14, 1985
Reccoa plans her next infiltration mission, this time to investigate the ship, Jupitris. Reccoa meets with Scirocco while Kamille is attacked by Sarah in space.
29	"Crisis at Side Two"; Transliteration: "Saido Tsū no Kiki" (Japanese: サイド2の危機)	Kunihisa Sugishima	Yumiko Suzuki	September 21, 1985
The Alexandria heads for Side Two with a canister of G3 gas, in a plan to destroy the colony and force the AEUG's surrender. The Radish and Argama send out their mobile suits and Kamille attempts to stop Jerid from deploying the gas, while the colony's mayor tries to appease the Titans.
30	"Jerid's Desperate Attack"; Transliteration: "Jerido Tokkō" (Japanese: ジェリド特攻)	Jun Hirabayashi	Akinori Endō	September 28, 1985
The Alexandria pursues the Argama and Radish to an abandoned colony. Jerid and Mouar fight with Kamille and when Mouar sacrifices herself to protect Jerid he takes revenge by attacking the Argama directly.
31	"Half Moon Love"; Transliteration: "Hāfu Mūn Rabu" (Japanese: ハーフムーン・ラブ)	Tsumakata Jinshi (Note: A pseudonym for Shinji Takamatsu; Shi-n-ji Ta-ka-ma-tsu spelled backwards.)	Yumiko Suzuki; Yoshiyuki Tomino	October 5, 1985
Sarah plants a bomb in Von Braun City, but Kamille soon catches up with her. Sarah warns Kamille of the bomb and he attempts to retrieve it as the Argama plans its escape before the bomb is set to explode.
32	"Unidentified Mobile Suits"; Transliteration: "Nazo no Mobiru Sūtsu" (Japanese: 謎のモビルスーツ)	Takaō Motohashi	Akinori Endō	October 12, 1985
The Argama and the Dogosse Gier both head for the Zeon forces that have entered the picture on the asteroid Axis in a race to see who can strike a deal with the Zeon first. Their respective Mobile Suit forces enter a battle with each other and are soon approached by the Zeon Mobile Suits as well.
33	"The Messenger from Axis"; Transliteration: "Akushizu kara no Shisha" (Japanese: アクシズからの使者)	Osamu Sekita	Akinori Endō	October 19, 1985
Wong Lee boards the Zeon ship Gwadan and Haman Karn introduces him to the current leader of the Zeon, Mineva Lao Zabi, the last surviving Zabi. Char's grudge against the Zabis doesn't help the AEUG's deal, and Scirocco plans his move for a deal with Zeon.
34	"The Call of Darkness"; Transliteration: "Sora ga Yobu Koe" (Japanese: 宇宙が呼ぶ声)	Toshifumi Kawase	Yumiko Suzuki	October 26, 1985
Wong Lee and Bright clash over what to do next. Yazan attacks the AEUG ships while Scirocco watches from the sidelines. Reccoa is distracted during the battle and is defeated by Yazan. The Argama and Radish head to the La Vie en Rose supply ship.
35	"Storm over Kilimanjaro"; Transliteration: "Kirimanjaro no Arashi" (Japanese: キリマンジャロの嵐)	Jun Hirabayashi	Yumiko Suzuki	November 2, 1985
The AEUG and Karaba intend to stage a joint attack on the Titans' base in Kilimanjaro. Kamille and Char head down to Earth as the Argama attacks from space. They find Jamitov and Four inside the base. Jamitov escapes as Four once again boards the Psyco Gundam.
36	"Forever Four"; Transliteration: "Eien no Fō" (Japanese: 永遠のフォウ)	Kunihisa Sugishima	Akinori Endō	November 9, 1985
Kamille infiltrates the base and finds Four. Jerid finds them and follows but ends up being overpowered by Kamille. Amuro and Char continue to attack the base while Jerid steals a Mobile Suit. Four is being controlled to protect Jamitov's shuttle, and Kamille tries to defeat Four in the Psyco Gundam as Jerid continues his pursuit. Four got killed by Jerid while attempting to save Kamille.
37	"The Day of Dakar"; Transliteration: "Dakāru no Hi" (Japanese: ダカールの日)	Hiroyuki Yokoyama	Yumiko Suzuki	November 16, 1985
Jerid pursues Karaba's Audhumla as the AEUG plans to infiltrate Dakar so that Char can break into the Federation Council and state his case. While the battle rages outside, Char makes an appearance on television and proclaims that the Federation has become just like the Zabis and they need to change and that people should move off of the Earth to help it recover.
38	"Reccoa's Shadow"; Transliteration: "Rekoa no Kehai" (Japanese: レコアの気配)	Osamu Sekita	Akinori Endō	November 23, 1985
Jerid continues his pursuit as Char, Kamille, and Amuro plan their return to space. Yazan attacks the Argama in space while Reccoa, now on the Alexandria views the battle and helps the mobile suits pilots escape the AEUG.
39	"By the Lake"; Transliteration: "Kohan" (Japanese: 湖畔)	Toshifumi Kawase	Yumiko Suzuki	November 30, 1985
Bask Om and Jamitov discuss strategy on Gryps while Kamille and the others attempt to relax at Colony 13. Rosamia runs into Kamille there and tells him she's his little sister. As Kamille, Fa, Rosamia, Shinta and Qum relax on the lake, they see Haman and Mineva nearby. Meanwhile, Char has his hands full with Mobile Suits that he spots.
40	"Activation of Gryps"; Transliteration: "Guripusu Shidō" (Japanese: グリプス始動)	Jun Hirabayashi	Akinori Endō	December 7, 1985
The Argama heads for Gryps to see if it was converted into a giant laser. Scirocco sends Reccoa out to attack her old comrades, and Kamille wonders what could have led to her defection. The laser fires and hits one of the colonies.
41	"Awakening"; Transliteration: "Mezame" (Japanese: 目覚め)	Kunihisa Sugishima	Yumiko Suzuki	December 14, 1985
Bask gives Reccoa the task of gassing another colony. Rosamia escapes the Argama and Char pursues. Kamille and Char battle with Reccoa after the gas is released.
42	"Goodbye, Rosammy"; Transliteration: "Sayonara Rozamī" (Japanese: さよならロザミィ)	Hiroyuki Yokoyama	Akinori Endō	December 21, 1985
Rosamia heads out in a new Mobile Suit to attack the Argama and Radish. The Alexandria retires from the battle. The colony that Haman and Mineva are on is targeted with the G3 poison gas, but Char and Kamille help to stop the plan, and fight with Rosamia.
43	"Haman's Victory"; Transliteration: "Hamān no Chōshō" (Japanese: ハマーンの嘲笑)	Osamu Sekita	Akinori Endō	January 4, 1986
The Gryps Laser aims for Granada. The AEUG plans to make an alliance with the Zeon against the Titans in order to stop the laser.
44	"The Gate of Zedan"; Transliteration: "Zedan no Mon" (Japanese: ゼダンの門)	Toshifumi Kawase	Yumiko Suzuki	January 11, 1986
Jamitov gives Jerid the mission to assassinate Haman. Sarah launches in battle against Kamille and the Argama's forces. Haman arrives on Zedan (formerly A Baoa Qu) and turns the tables on Jamitov and Jerid. Kamille fights against Sarah, who is then taken to the Argama and held captive.
45	"Coming from the Heavens"; Transliteration: "Ten kara Kuru Mono" (Japanese: 天から来るもの)	Jun Hirabayashi	Akinori Endō	January 18, 1986
Haman takes Axis towards Zedan in a plan to destroy it. Apolly defends Fa from Jerid while Jerid and Kamille continue their long battle. Char tries to get Kamille to focus on more than one suit in the battle. Char heads for Haman's ship to negotiate.
46	"Scirocco Rises"; Transliteration: "Shirokko Tatsu" (Japanese: シロッコ立つ)	Toshifumi Kawase; Kunihisa Sugishima	Yumiko Suzuki	January 25, 1986
Scirocco heads to the Gwadan to negotiate with Haman. As Mineva talks with Char, Kamille is allowed to board the ship. Jamitov also joins the negotiations. Katz runs in and attempts to kill Scirocco; but Sarah blasts a hole in the ship and mass confusion ensues.
47	"A Descent into the Maelstrom"; Transliteration: "Sora no Uzu" (Japanese: 宇宙の渦)	Hiroyuki Yokoyama	Akinori Endō	February 1, 1986
The Argama attacks the Axis fleet while Char, Kamille, and the others continue their assault. Haman launches in her Qubeley in a plan to destroy the AEUG.
48	"The Mirror of Rosamia"; Transliteration: "Rozamia no Naka de" (Japanese: ロザミアの中で)	Osamu Sekita	Yumiko Suzuki	February 8, 1986
Rosamia launches from the Dogosse Gier in the new Mark II Psyco Gundam. The AEUG team sneaks into Axis in an attempt to contact Gryps and so that the laser can be used to fire on Axis. As Rosamia's mind breaks down Kamille is given the hard choice of whether to end her misery.
49	"Casualties of War"; Transliteration: "Inochi Chitte" (Japanese: 生命散って)	Jun Hirabayashi	Akinori Endō	February 15, 1986
The Argama and Radish are pressed in by both the AEUG and Axis. All the Mobile Suits launch and Kamille enters his final battle with Jerid. Scirocco and Reccoa head for the battlefield as the Radish falls. A large battle commences with many fatalities occurring.
50	"Riders in the Skies"; Transliteration: "Sora o Kakeru" (Japanese: 宇宙を駆ける)	Toshifumi Kawase	Akinori Endō	February 22, 1986
Scirocco enters the colony laser and is stopped by Char. Haman offers Char a chance to rule with the Zabis. Kamille also enters and the four of them enter the final standoff as the laser is about to fire. Everyone escapes and heads for their mobile suits and enter the final battle, where the spirits of the fallen aid Kamille in the Zeta Gundam, and only the Zeon are poised to come out on top.
