= List of Mobile Suit Gundam ZZ episodes =

Cover of the first DVD boxset by Bandai Visual.

Mobile Suit Gundam ZZ is a 1986 Japanese science fiction anime television series created and directed by Yoshiyuki Tomino and produced by Nagoya Broadcasting Network, Sotsu Agency, and Sunrise with music production by Starchild Records. Mobile Suit Gundam ZZ is the sequel to the 1986 Japanese science fiction series Mobile Suit Zeta Gundam. Spanning 47 episodes, the series premiered in Japan on Nagoya Broadcasting Network on March 1, 1986, and concluded on January 31, 1987.

Four pieces of theme music are used over the course of the series—two opening themes and two closing themes. For the first twenty-five episodes, the opening theme is "It's Not an Anime" (Anime Ja Nai) and the closing theme is "The Era is Crying" (Jidai ga Naiteiru), both by Masahito Arai. For the remaining twenty-two episodes, the opening theme is "Silent Voice" and the closing theme is "Ten Million Years Galaxy" (Issenman-Nen Ginga), both by Jun Hiroe.

Bandai said that they had no plans for an English dub to be produced in North America and it is unlikely that there will be one in the future, due to the shutdown of Bandai Entertainment.

== Episode list ==
No.	Title	Directed by	Written by	Original release date
1	"Prelude of ZZ"; Transliteration: "Pureryūdo Daburu Zēta" (Japanese: プレリュードZZ)	Misao Minamida	Ken Terasawa	March 1, 1986
The episode is mainly a recap of Zeta Gundam and part of Gundam, while also explaining mobile suit types to the audience. Voices are done by the crew of the Argama, and it ends, leading to a preview of the true first episode of Gundam ZZ.
2	"The Young Man from Shangri-La"; Transliteration: "Shangurira no Shōnen" (Japanese: シャングリラの少年)	Kunihisa Sugishima	Yumiko Suzuki	March 8, 1986
The AEUG is devastated both physically and mentally after the final battle against the Titans and Axis. With the loss of most of their forces, they decide to hide themselves in Side-1's Shangri-La colony and begin their recovery efforts. A boy named Judau Ashta, after collecting and doing his job as a junk dealer, finds a pod containing Yazan, still alive. After talking with him regarding the Argama, they decide to work together to steal the Zeta Gundam, though Judau and his friends want to just sell the mobile suit. At the port, Fa places Kamille in an ambulance and is about to leave when Judau and Yazan take her hostage. Shinta and Qum hide under the ambulance, and Judau searches the back and finds the vegetative Kamille. Kamille looks at him and holds out his hand, so Judau touches him and shares a strange Newtype experience with the comatose pilot. As they head for the Argama's dock, Yazan tells Judau they should have no trouble with the Argama's diminished crew. And despite being hardly armed with little more than vegetables and one Titan, Yazan proves to be right, as Judau is successfully able to steal the Zeta Gundam, but has trouble starting it up. But after Yazan kills Saegusa during the assault and reveals his true colors as a Titan, he activates the Zeta Gundam. Armed in only a Petite, Yazan attacks anyway, trying to get the Gundam himself. Unfortunately, Judau's control of the machine is poor, and they are forced into the colony. Abandoning the Petite as it is useless, Yazan boards a Middle mobile suit. Judau eventually pulls out a beam saber, but drops it, allowing Yazan to pick it up and gain the advantage, at least until Judau destroys the suit with forearm grenades and defeats Yazan. Afterwards, Bright is able to subdue the Zeta Gundam with a Petite and some wires, but Beecha and the rest of Judau's friends activate bombs. During this distraction, both Judau and Yazan manage to escape. In space, the Neo Zeon ship Endra sends a briefcase over to Shangri-La.
3	"The Knight of the Endra"; Transliteration: "Endora no Kishi" (Japanese: エンドラの騎士)	Hiroyuki Yokoyama	Akinori Endō	March 15, 1986
The mysterious suitcase from space lands in Side 1 and the executives in charge the facilities open it up, discovering it is a payment to allow an Axis cruiser to land in their spaceport. The executives decide to allow the Axis to land despite the port also being host to the Axis's rivals, the Argama. In the port, the Argama's Captain Bright Noa is warned about the Axis ship by one of the executives, a Chimatter warns about the potential conflict and advises the Argama to avoid contact with the Axis cruiser by taking the Argama through one of the space colony's maintenance tunnels. Meanwhile, Judau Ashta's crew of misfits and his annoying little sister Leina Ashta start another foolhardy attempt to steal the broken Zeta Gundam. While they argue, they witness the Agrama in transit and give chase with Judau using his Petite Mobile Suit. He sneaks aboard and is given free rein over the ship since he reminds Bright of how both Amuro Ray and Kamille Bidan were at the start of their respective adventures. While Judau greets Shinta and Qum, the Argama comes under assault from a mobile suit piloted by the captain of the Axis cruiser, Mashymre Cello in his own foolish plan to capture Zeta for his beloved Haman Karn. Judau harms Mashymre's Gallus-J, providing Fa Yuiry the opportunity to launch in the Methuss. Then living up to Bright's expectations, Judau boards the Zeta and engages in a duel with Mashymre. Despite a comical lack of skill, Judau stumbles into beheading Mashymre's Gallus and wins the battle. The Zeta is returned to the Argama but Judau, who bids the crew farewell and explains that he still intends to steal the Zeta Gundam and sell it for profit. After he is off the deck, the Argama lets itself be covered in refuse to conceal its location, but Judau knows where it is hidden.
4	"Hot-Blooded Mashymre"; Transliteration: "Nekketsu no Mashumā" (Japanese: 熱血のマシュマー)	Osamu Sekita	Yumiko Suzuki	March 22, 1986
Having been defeated by the Zeta Gundam, Mashymre Cello seizes an opportunity to strike back. As Judau Ashta and his friends search for the Argama, they happen to spot Mashymre launching into battle. Not wanting to be beaten to the prize, Judau grabs on to Mashymre's Galluss-J, hoping to stop it.
5	"Judau's Decision"; Transliteration: "Judō no Ketsui" (Japanese: ジュドーの決意)	Jun Hirabayashi	Akinori Endō	March 29, 1986
Junk dealer Gemon Bajack comes to Mashymre Cello, promoting his self-built mobile suit "Geze." With two Gaza-Cs as escorts, Gemon heads out to attack the Argama. But on the way, he spots a giant "Z-G" drawn in a schoolyard by Shinta and Qum. Taking it as a written challenge from the Zeta Gundam, he changes course and heads for the school.
6	"The Menace of the Zssa"; Transliteration: "Zusa no Kyōi" (Japanese: ズサの脅威)	Toshifumi Kawase	Yumiko Suzuki	April 5, 1986
Axis Captain Mashymre Cello plots to defeat the Argama, although he stresses that he has no desire to bring harm to the residents of Shangri-La, as he believes is the wish of his crush, Haman Karn. In the refuse yard where the Argama is undergoing repair Judau and his friends enjoy a lunch with the Argama's crew. Although they're reluctant to join the Argama's regular crew, Noa Bright requests they stay with the ship until it needs to leave Side 1. Judau rejects the offer and storms out. Mashymre begins his clumsy attack in the Zssa to lure out the Zeta, Since there's no qualified Zeta pilot available, Fa goes to combat Mahymre in the Methuss, and Beecha goes to retrieve Judau. Despite Mashymre's wishes, the Mobile suit battle escalates with the Zeta (piloted by Mr. Astonage) and the Gaza-C team enterting combat, causing additional damage to the upper-class residences. After much persuasion from his friends, Judau agrees to pilot the Zeta again, claiming it is to repay the debt for the lunch the Argama crew provided him with earlier. In intricate maneuver's around the Colony's garbage piles, Judau is able to take out both Gaza-C mobile suits. Eventually he's locked into a close quarters fight with the Zssa. When the Methuss intervienes again, Mashymre retreats and the fight is over before Yazan Gable can do anything this episode. Judau's sister Leina explains her new policy of basically blackmailing Judau to continue working with the Argama crew. The Upper class suffer more losses as karma for allying with the Axis forces.
7	"The Gaza Storm"; Transliteration: "Gaza no Arashi" (Japanese: ガザの嵐)	Kunihisa Sugishima	Akinori Endō	April 12, 1986
Now full fledge members of the Argama, Judau and his friends attempt to find a way to open the colony hatch so that the Argama can leave Shangri La. Meanwhile, Mashymre decides it is time to use full force against the Argama and allows the Gaza Squadron the chance to defeat the Zeta Gundam. The Gaza trio launch an attack on the Argama, while making it appear to the public as though the Argama is responsible for the damage being done to the colony. Fa launches in the Zeta Gundam to defend the crew, while Judau is held captive by Germon. However he is saved by a girl called Roux Louka, who then proceeds to use a core fighter to back up the Zeta. Eventually Judau manages to sortie with the Zeta and, with Roux's help, defeats the Gaza Squadron, which shocks Mashymre. Roux introduces herself as a new recruit sent by the La Vie en Rose supply ship to help the Argama, and the episode ends with Bright deciding it is time to leave the colony for threat of another attack and Judau assuring Bright that he will get the colony hatch open.
8	"The Funeral Bell Tolls Twice"; Transliteration: "Chinkon no Kane wa Nido Naru" (Japanese: 鎮魂の鐘は二度鳴る)	Hiroyuki Yokoyama	Yumiko Suzuki	April 19, 1986
The crew of the Endra mourn their fallen comrades and Mashymre encourages them that the only way to mourn is to avenge and prepares to assault the Argama as soon as it leaves Shangri La. Roux goes to stop Yazan and Germon from preventing the opening of the colony hatch and Judau goes to back her up. In the following altercation a misfire of a signal flare causes the Argama to launch thinking that the hatch is open, leaving it open to attack. Yazan and Germon sortie their mobile suits and begin assaulting the Argama as it tries to land. Judau comes to their defense in the Zeta, killing Germon in the process and then proceeding to battle Yazan, with Yazan blaming Judau for all of his misfortunes and matching Judau blow for blow. Meanwhile Roux succeeds in opening the hatch, but as the Argama prepares to leave, Yazan tries to ram the Zeta into it, and Mashymre plans on opening fire as soon as the Argama enters the hatch. Judau defeats Yazan, along with damaging the Endra's beam cannon, steadily becoming aware that he is, in fact, a Newtype, and successfully escapes the colony before the hatch closes. Another funeral is held for Germon and (the supposedly dead) Yazan by Mashymre and the Endra, with Mashymre vowing to continue his hunt for both the Argama and the Zeta in Space.
9	"Judau in Space"; Transliteration: "Uchū no Judō" (Japanese: 宇宙のジュドー)	Osamu Sekita	Akinori Endō	April 26, 1986
While trying to find the La Vie en Rose, the Argama gets lost in space with Roux getting separated from the others. Meanwhile, annoyed at how they are being treated, Beecha and Mondo plan to betray the Argama to the Endra, forcing an unwilling Iino to help do so. The Endra receives the signal sent out by the boys and Mashymre and a squad of Gaza's launch out to destroy the Argama and soon find Roux. Passing herself off as a lost test pilot, Mashymre sends Roux back to the Endra with Glemy Toto, who is instantly smitten with her, while Mashymre confronts Judau in the Zeta. Forgetting to bring a charger for his beam gun, Judau can only evade the enemy mobile suits, until he devises a strategy that defeats them using dummy meteors. Judau fights against Mashymre in his Hamma Hamma and Roux succeeds in tricking Glemy to free her, while disabling his Gaza, but sparing him as thanks for his kindness. Mashymre proceeds to attack Roux, but she is saved by Judau, who forces Mashymre to retreat with Glemy, but not before gloating to Judau about a spy on board the Argama. Back in the bridge, Bright and crew dismiss the warning as a trick to cause mistrust among one another, and are then told that the Argama has found the La Vie en Rose.
10	"Sayonara, Fa"; Transliteration: "Sayonara Fa" (Japanese: さよならファ)	Jun Hirabayashi	Yumiko Suzuki	May 3, 1986
As the Argama moves closer to the La Vie en Rose to establish contact, Fa is torn between staying with the Argama or returning to Shangri La to be with Kamille and the stress causes her to be overbearing on Judau and the gang over chores. Roux, who is leaving to pick up a new unit from the La Vie en Rose, tells her to be true to her feelings and return to Kamille, but Fa tells her to butt out of her business. Beecha and Mondo send another signal to the Endra so it can pick them up, but on board the Endra Chara Soon tells Mashymre that he is to remain at Shangri La and cease pursuit of the Argama as it is an order from Haman. Mashymre launches anyway with Gotten to capture or destroy the Argama to prove himself. As the mobile suits attack the Argama, Beecha and Mondo try to help by destroying the Argama's dummy meteors, meanwhile Gotten sneaks on board the Argama to make contact with the two. Judua sorties with the Zeta but his beam gun is not charged forcing him to fight hand to hand. Fa launches in the Methuss to repair the beam gun and scolds Judau for being ignorant, Mashymre discovers them so Judau holds him off. The beam gun repaired, Fa delivers it to Judau and takes a hit from the Hamma-Hamma, saving him but disabling the Methuss. Judau repels Mashymre with the beam gun and goes to save Fa, but she tells him to save the Argama instead, he agrees but promises to come back for her. Judau drives off the enemies with help from Roux, who returns with a new core fighter and Mashymre retreats, unaware that Gotten has been captured. Judau tries to go back for Fa, but is stopped by Bright who tells him she is drifting towards Shangri La and they will save her. Judau feels bad that he cannot properly thank Fa for saving him and wonders if she will return, but Roux assures him this is what Fa wants as now she can be with Kamille. Gotten confirms to Bright that there are traitors on board the Argama and as Fa drifts in space she reaffirms her faith in Judau and bids farewell to her friends and crewmates, noting that she will not be coming back.
11	"Activate! Double Zeta"; Transliteration: "Shidō! Daburu Zēta" (Japanese: 始動!ダブル·ゼータ)	Toshifumi Kawase	Akinori Endō	May 10, 1986
Mashymre equips his Hamma-Hamma with a new weapon which he feels will finally let him defeat the Zeta Gundam so Chara decides to sortie with him in the next attack. Judau confronts Iino on why he did not tell him that Beecha and Mondo were the Zeon conspirers, while Shinta and Qum, who were planning on bringing back Fa, are tricked by Gottn into releasing him. Gotten kidnaps Iino and makes his escape only to crash into an asteroid, but is rescued by Mashymre, who begins the attack. Iino is rescued by the La Vie en Rose, who has finished all the parts for the ZZ (Double Zeta) Gundam, and Judau battles Mashymre but finds himself powerless against the Hamma-Hamma's new weapon. Roux goes to fetch the ZZ (but not before begging Judau not to die) and Beecha and Mondo make their escape from the Argama. The duo is nearly killed by Chara, but Judau saves them, though is defeated when both Chara and Mashymre double team him. However Judau acquires the core fighter that Beecha and Mondo escaped with, and Roux and Iino soon bring him the other two core fighters allowing Judau to form the colossal ZZ Gundam, whose fast speed and raw power forces Mashymre into a retreat.
12	"Leina Vanishes"; Transliteration: "Rīna ga Kieta" (Japanese: リィナが消えた)	Kunihisa Sugishima	Yumiko Suzuki	May 17, 1986
Mashymre is ordered to leave the Endra, unwillingly relinquishing command to Chara, who plans on capturing the ZZ. Judau salvages parts while passing through a junkyard, instead of guarding the La Vie en Rose, and so is scolded by Bright and Leina for neglecting his responsibilities. Leina and Roux decide to guard the La Vie en Rose instead, but it soon comes under attack from the Endra. Glemy launches and confronts Roux, wanting to pay her back from their last encounter, while Judau, upon hearing that Leina is on the battlefield, rushes to aide them and save Leina. Roux and Leina are pinned down by Glemy, who has developed feelings for Roux, but Roux once again tricks him into releasing them. Judau arrives followed by Elle in the Core Base so Chara orders the capture of the three, while Glemy prevents them from forming the ZZ. Iino arrives in a makeshift repair Zeta and buys enough time for Judau to form the ZZ. Fending off Glemy and the enemy mobile suits Chara confronts Judau in her R-Jarja; while at first evenly matched, Judau's developing Newtype powers causes him to enter a hypnotic state leaving him open to attack. Roux and Leina protect him from Chara, but Chara knocks the core fighter away, causing Leina to be ejected from the cockpit. Judau senses her cries and awakens, and uses the ZZ's high mega cannon to force Chara and her troops into retreat, but not before Glemy rescues Leina, mistaking her for Roux. Roux informs Judua of Leina's capture, leaving Judau distressed and angered.
13	"Little Sister!"; Transliteration: "Imōto yo!" (Japanese: 妹よ!)	Hiroyuki Yokoyama	Akinori Endō	May 24, 1986
While the Argama and its mobile suits undergo maintenance and repair at the La Vie en Rose, Bright tasks Elle, Beecha, Mondo, and Iino with keeping Judau on board, as he is sure to attempt a foolhardy rescue of Leina. Sure enough Roux is trying to keep Judau away from the hangar bay, but with help from Elle, who sympathizes with him, he gets past Roux and makes it to the hangar, though is caught before he can sortie in the ZZ. On board the Endra, Leina is looked after by Glemy, who attempts to teach her sophisticated manners, Chara plans another attack and launches, and Leina tries to escape but is caught by Glemy, though he kindly tells her he will release her to Roux if she appears. Judau is confined to a room, but is once again freed by Elle and the two escapes with ZZ and the Gundam Mk II, unknowingly taking Beecha and Mondo with them. Soon enough the two encounter Gottn and Chara, the latter revealing her plan: an encasing web of bombs. As Judau and Elle battle them he lets it slip that Leina is his sister, which gives Gottn the idea to use her as a hostage. Glemy refuses to do so, but accepts when he mistakenly believes Roux to be piloting the Mk II, and so brings Leina to the bridge. Gottn threatens Leina's life unless Judau surrenders, distressing Judau, but before any action can be taken Beecha and Mondo detach the core base from the ZZ, accidentally disabling Mondo's unit, and thus saving Leina, but wind up stuck on the Endra. With everything gone wrong, Chara orders a retreat before Leina can be rescued; Emary Ounce, captain of the La Vie en Rose, is impressed with the piloting skills of both Judau and Elle and reaffirms that both of them are strong Newtypes. Elle is concerned for Judua, but he responds that he will definitely save Leina.
14	"The Phantom Colony, Part 1"; Transliteration: "Maboroshi no Koronī (Zen)" (Japanese: 幻のコロニー (前))	Jun Hirabayashi	Yumiko Suzuki	May 31, 1986
The Argama discovers a colony known as Moon-Moon, who has been forgotten by the outside world, and invite the crew in. Upon entry however the Argama is stormed by warriors who fear their mobile suits, believing them to be gods, and so the crew dismantles the ZZ to appease them. While Bright and Emary go to meet the cult leader, Judau is secretly abducted. The Endra crew is also on board the colony, and while exploring Chara is also kidnapped. Discovering her disappearance as well as the Argama's presence, Gottn orders a squad of Gaza to storm the colony and hold Leina hostage on one of them until Chara is returned. Judau and Chara are told by their kidnapper, Rasara, of Moon-Moon's goal: to leave the colony so to spread their word of peace throughout the galaxy via their messiah, who she believes, is someone on board the Endra or the Argama; however Rasara disagrees with the plan as she is aware that in doing so the moon society would lose its peaceful lifestyle. Noticing the commotion outside Judau and Chara go to rescue Leina, but Chara soon takes part in the attack when she is found. Judua receives the core units to form the ZZ and defeats the Gaza's, while apprehending Chara, but fails to save Leina. Judua's actions causes Moon-Moon's inhabitants to believe he is the messiah they have been waiting for, so he along with Chara and the others are brought before Moon Cults leader Sarasa, who looks exactly like Rasara.
15	"The Phantom Colony, Part 2"; Transliteration: "Maboroshi no Koronī (Kō)" (Japanese: 幻のコロニー (後))	Osamu Sekita	Yumiko Suzuki	June 7, 1986
The tribe leader introduces herself as Sarasa Moon, and asks Judau to take her and the rest of her cult off Moon-Moon to spread their message of peace, but Judau refuses, believing her to be Rasara and reminding her of her fear of leaving Moon-Moon. Annoyed at his refusal, Sarasa declares he cannot be their savior and orders the groups' imprisonment, but Judau, Elle, and Iino manage to escape. They are rescued by Mondo and Rasara who reveals that Sarasa is her twin sister and that her real reason for wanting to escape Moon-Moon is because she has become unsatisfied with life in the colony and also wishes to end the wars plaguing the world, which she blames on machines. Sarasa and her cult are tricked into aligning themselves with the Endra and plan to give them the ZZ and the Argama in exchange for taking them off the colony, meanwhile Judau's group rescues Bright, Emary, and Roux while also taking Chara as their prisoner. The group splits up to return to the Argama and recover the ZZ, and Rasara also plans to awaken the old mobile suit which is the cult's god to prove that machines are not dangerous. Judau recovers ZZ and goes to save Leina but accidentally damages the Endra causing it to begin exploding. Glemy, having been radioed for help, arrives and saves Leina before Judau, while Rasara with Mondo's help moves the old mobile suit, convincing Sarasa of her sisters' point. The Endra crew, Beecha and Mondo included, flee and it is revealed that the cult elder, Role, tricked Sarasa into believing the cult's ideology so that he could leave Moon-Moon out of his desire to see the rest of the galaxy, to which Judau scolds him for, as he would be throwing away a life of peace for a war torn galaxy. With the sisters and the colony now at peace with each other the Argama crew depart, admiring the peace that Moon-Moon is privileged to have.
16	"Melee Aboard the Argama"; Transliteration: "Āgama no Hakuheisen" (Japanese: アーガマの白兵戦)	Toshifumi Kawase	Akinori Endō	June 14, 1986
After the conflict in the Moon-Moon colony the Argama must once again dock with the La Vie en Rose for repairs. Emary reveals her feelings to Bright, who kindly lets her down and Judau tries to raise everyone's spirit with a speech on how everyone must come together as a team, but is interrupted and punched by Elle for labeling Beecha and Mondo as traitors. With the Endra gone and Chara held prisoner on the Argama, Glemy assumes command of a new ship, which soon captures a supply transporter for the Argama. Gottn and the remaining Endra crew members use it to launch a sneak attack on the Argama, against Glemy's order, but are successful in invading the ship. While the Endra crew tries to capture the gundams, with Judau and the gang holding them off, Gottn holds Emary hostage to force Bright to surrender the Argama. Just then a Zeon soldier blasts open a hole in the Argama, causing Gottn and Emary to be launched into space, but are picked up by the Bawoo mobile suit. Judau launches in the ZZ and faces Gottn in the Bawoo, however with their mission now failed the rest of the Endra crew rushes out to the Bawoo, just before Judau opens fire. Seeing the soldiers Judau hesitates to take their lives, but Torres tells Judau to just fire as they are fighting a war, but in the commotion Judau sees Emary escape the Bawoo, and thus does not fire, saving Emary but letting the Zeon soldiers go. Emary is rescued by Bright, with the two sharing a moment, and the pair is brought back to the Argama by Judau, who decides once repairs are done he must rescue Leina.
17	"Retrieve the Core Top!"; Transliteration: "Dakkai! Koa Toppu" (Japanese: 奪回!コア·トップ)	Kunihisa Sugishima	Akinori Endō	June 21, 1986
The Argama and the La Vie en Rose go their separate ways and the Argama receives a new cannon weapon from their supplier to use against the Neo Zeon base, Axis. Judau is frightened when he realizes that attacking Axis would put Leina in danger, but is reassured by his friends that they will get her back before mounting an assault. Gottn and his men try to think of another attack strategy to subdue the Argama, while Chara plays on Judau's fear of Leina being hurt to convince him to free her. Shinta and Qum intervene in Chara's scheme, so she kidnaps Shinta and flees the Argama in the ZZ's core top. Judau and Iino man the remaining core fighters and Elle and Roux sortie the Mk II and Zeta respectively to rescue Shinta and recapture Chara, however their launching prompts Gottn to attack them. As the fighting goes on, Judau and Iino manage to dock their core fighters with Chara's and form ZZ, trapping her and repelling the enemy with the Argama. The tide of the battle quickly shifts however, when the hidden Qubeley Mk II mobile suit reveals itself and gains the upper hand against the ZZ, the Zeta, and the Mk II using its funnels. Believing the pilot to be the leader of Neo Zeon, Haman Karn, Bright is left with no choice but to fire the new cannon to attempt to defeat her, however the blast misses the Qubeley and destroys and abandoned colony with great destructive power. Judau is shocked at the destruction caused, and is completely overcome with fear that Leina is in danger so long as she is in Axis, resulting in him deserting the Argama to mount a solo rescue of Leina at Axis.
18	"Haman's Black Shadow"; Transliteration: "Hamān no Kuroi Kage" (Japanese: ハマーンの黒い影)	Hiroyuki Yokoyama	Akinori Endō	June 28, 1986
Judau successfully sneaks into Axis by hiding his core fighter in a dummy meteor, while Glemy speaks with Haman about the preparations for heading to Earth. The pilot of the Qubeley Mk II is revealed to be a young girl called Elpeo Ple, who appears to be a Newtype, as she senses Judau's presence in the colony and rushes to meet him. Beecha and Mondo are fed up with the treatment they have been receiving and decide to return to the Argama, while rescuing Leina as means to make peace with the crew. Elsewhere Judau meets Ple, who, rather than capture him, is affectionate towards him. Judau spends time with Ple who in turn agrees to take him to where Leina is, unaware that Leina had escaped from Glemy and met up with Beecha and Mondo. The trio hijacks a mobile suit to escape but realize they cannot as the suit has no hatch, while Judau and Ple reach Haman's palace, alerting Haman to Judau's strong Newtype presence. Judau gets fed up with Ple and leaves to find Leina himself, but is confronted by Haman, whose strong and dark Newtype powers disturb Judau. He manages to escape her thanks to the distraction caused by the mobile suit Beecha was operating, though he fails to realize Leina was with Beecha, and thus escapes Axis in pursuit of a departing ship, believing Leina to be on board. He is caught by Ple in the Qubeley who wants to continue playing with him, revealing Leina is still in Axis, but is stopped by Iino who brings the other two core fighters. Ple tries to kill Iino, but Judau scolds her and forms the ZZ to stop her. Upset by Judau's treatment Ple retreats before he can calm her, and he returns to Axis to attempt another rescue of Leina.
19	"Ple and Axis"; Transliteration: "Puru to Akushizu to" (Japanese: プルとアクシズと)	Jun Hirabayashi	Akinori Endō	July 12, 1986
Judau returns to Axis, offering the ZZ as a gift in exchange for letting him onbaord. Beecha and Mondo are detained by Glemy who questions the pair, but they anger Glemy with jokes of how Roux, Glemy's love interest, may be in a relationship with Judau. Hearing Judau is onbaord, Glemy confronts him and is not impressed, so he has Judau imprisoned and takes the ZZ. Ple breaks Judau out, but he in turn traps her in the cell, unaware that she was trying to help him. Angered, Ple reaches Leina before Judau does and takes her hostage on board the Quebely Mk II; Elle arrives in the Gundam Mk II and helps Judau recover the ZZ, while rescuing Beecha and Mondo, and he goes to confront Ple. Both Judua and Leina manage to convince Ple to stop before she destroys the home where she grew up, but Glemy arrives and escapes with Ple. Judau pursues them into space, allowing the Argama to now fire the cannon at Axis, but Judau adamantly refuses knowing it would hurt innocent civilians. Roux, in the Zeta, and Elle force Judau to move and the cannon is fired, greatly damaging Axis, though not destroying it. With Haman and her forces approaching the Argama retreats.
20	"Tearful Cecillia (Part I)"; Transliteration: "Nakimushi Seshiria (Zen)" (Japanese: 泣き虫セシリア (前))	Osamu Sekita	Yumiko Suzuki	July 19, 1986
The Argama is sent to Grenada for new orders. Torres, Milly, Judau and Elle meet Torres' friend Cecilia waitressing at a restaurant. Gottn hires her as a spy. Mondo and Beecha arrive at the restaurant but Milly calls them which blows their cover and gets them into a fight with Axis soldiers Nel and Grey. Nel and Grey leave then the Argama's crew. After returning to space Judau, Mondo and Beccha launch and are intercepted by Nel and Grey. An Axis mobile suit is destroyed and after Judau hesitates to tell Torres that Cecilia is an Axis spy.
21	"Tearful Cecillia (Part II)"; Transliteration: "Nakimushi Seshiria (Gō)" (Japanese: 泣き虫セシリア (後))	Toshifumi Kawase	Yumiko Suzuki	July 26, 1986
The Axis plan to blow up the colony fails and Gotton is killed. Cecilia sacrifices herself in order to save the civilian transport ship "Cassiopeia" when she discovers that the suitcase she brought on board with her was actually a bomb.
22	"Judau, Sorties!!"; Transliteration: "Judō, Shutsugeki!!" (Japanese: ジュドー、出撃!!)	Kunihisa Sugishima	Akinori Endō	August 2, 1986
The episode starts with another voice over – Judau tells us that the Argama is now in orbit of the Earth, and could be attacked at any time. We also see something being delivered to the ship, Quattro Bajina's Ms – the Hyaku shiki (Type 100). Bright and Mika are talking, and Mika tells us that AEUG's high command have ordered that the Argama destroys the Sandra before it reaches Earth with its main cannon. Beecha and Mondo suggest a plan to Judau, which is to attach bombs all around the ZZ, so the enemy won't attack in fear of an explosion that may catch them as well, and he can get Leina back. However, when he goes to install the bombs, they laugh and tell each other they can't stand him being the hero all the time. On board the Sandra, Haman tells them to stop broadcasting Minovsky particles, that they should let the Argama come to its death. Various people are seen and Haman gives a speech to her men, then a dark-skinned man gets into an MS called the Dreissen, and goes to attack the Argama. The ZZ launches, and gets to the Sandra. Haman lets him aboard, and wants to personally take him to Leina. On the way she says that they're the same type of person, both Newtypes, but Judau isn't interested, and Haman tells him that Leina isn't there. She tries to convince Judau that they're not enemies, and partially succeeds while moving in to kiss him, until some guards come and interrupt. Meanwhile, outside the yellow Endra reveals itself and goes on a suicide run, but the Argama dodges. The captain of the ship, who's also the pilot of the Dreissen, tells them to reunite with the Sandra and its fleet, while he leads in the Dreissen. Judau finds his way back to the ZZ, and blasts his way out of the ship, but is ambushed by the Dreissen. With help from the gundam Mk2 and the Zeta gundam, he is able to defeat it, but the pilot ejects before the Mobile Suit explodes.
23	"Earth Ablaze"; Transliteration: "Moeru Chikyū" (Japanese: 燃える地球)	Hiroyuki Yokoyama	Akinori Endō	August 9, 1986
Judau wants to attack the Sandra fleet to get back Leina, and heads out in the Zeta Gundam for a speed advantage. He is ambushed by Elpeo Ple, who has been brainwashed, and Glemy. Roux launches in the ZZ, Beecha in the Hyaku Shiki, and Elle in the Mk2. Many Zssa Mobile Suit attack, but Loux tells Beecha and Elle to assist Judau, who's fighting the Qubeley, and let her take care of the Zssa. Zeta is having real trouble fighting the Qubeley, and so Judau tries to reason with Ple – she almost accepts, but then pulls a gun and shoots Judau. Zeta escapes, but Glemy accidentally hits Qubeley with his shots, causing her to tumble towards the earth. It starts to go into re-entry, but Judau rescues it in the Zeta, going underneath it. He tells her to destroy Qubeley's shoulders, to increase stability. Everyone descends into the atmosphere using Ballutes, and the episode ends when Judau sees Earth in all its vastness.
24	"Siblings' Love on the South Seas"; Transliteration: "Nankai ni Saku Kyōdaiai" (Japanese: 南海に咲く兄妹愛)	Shinji Takamatsu	Yumiko Suzuki	August 16, 1986
The weather takes a turn for the worse, as the Argama lands near the coast of Africa. Soon, it is a raging storm. A lone sailing boat says that it will take the Argama to a safe place, for the price of $5000. For some reason, Judau escapes onto the boat during the money transfer, and becomes friends with the sailor, Teran. Unfortunately, he's unscrupulous about getting money to support him and his sister, and so leads the attack of an underwater squadron against the Argama. Judau tries to stop him, but fails. While this was going on, Ple found her way onto the Core Fighter, and arrives just in time to rescue Judau. He successfully defeats all the Marine Suits, and convinces Teran that he should stop doing things like this. The boy agrees, and plows his Kapool into the Zeon's underwater base, jumping out at the last minute.
25	"Rommel's Face"; Transliteration: "Ronmeru no Kao" (Japanese: ロンメルの顔)	Osamu Sekita	Akinori Endō	August 23, 1986
The MS pilots of the Argama leave the relative safety of its position to find a way across the desert. In a small village, the Desert Rommel platoon has been waiting, biding their time for 8 long years since the One Year War. A dozen or so fighters, all equipped with very customized desert Zakus, led by their Captain, who pilots a Customized Dowadge. They set up an ambush, and attack the Zeta Gundam, but then the ZZ, Hyaku Shiki and Mark II find Judau and give him a hand, systematically destroying the troop. The captain can't believe that his 8 years spent training was destroyed by a boy, and goes in for a final attack. The captain and his mobile suit is destroyed, and Judau can't understand why he did it, knowing he would die.
26	"Masai's Heart"; Transliteration: "Masai no Kokoro" (Japanese: マサイの心)	Toshifumi Kawase	Yumiko Suzuki	August 30, 1986
While the Judau goes to find water in the Core Fighter, Ple causes more trouble by using up all the water to cool herself off. This doesn't bode well, and she starts getting bullied by Roux and Elle, who are really wound up because of her actions. Judau finds a woman in the desert who give him a bit of water, and says she'll lead him to the Oasis. However, they end up back where the MS are, and just in time, as Loux and Elle were going to bury Ple. She tells them to follow their shadows to get to the village where the water is. They do, but the villagers push them away. Judau and Ple go back to pick up the Core Fighter, and see the woman go into a cave. It turns out, that she has a mobile suit, originally belonging to her dead husband. It is a Gelgoog S-type (which means her husband was an ace pilot), and although it is 8 years out of date, it gives the Hyaku Shiki, Mk-2 and Zeta a good fight until Judau shows up and combines to make the ZZ Gundam. Again, the pilot makes a final suicidal attack, but this time, Judau rescues her in time. The episode ends with her sitting in the corner of a burnt out building, with the village elder telling someone that her heart died with the mobile suit, and she'll never be the same again.
27	"Leina's Blood (Part I)"; Transliteration: "Rīna no chi (Zen)" (Japanese: リィナの血 (前))	Kunihisa Sugishima	Akinori Endō	September 6, 1986
The scene opens with the celebrations of Haman Kahn and several other officers, as well as Mineva Zabi in a procession down the street. It seems that the remains of the corrupt Earth Federation, Titans and Neo Zeon are all gathered to welcome Mineva Zabi. Elle sees this and recognizes Leina in the sea of faces, and reports to Judau. In the middle of the following night, he steals away in the Core Fighter, trying to rescue her by himself. Roux and Elle realize this, and follow him in the Zeta and Hyaku Shiki. They make a distraction outside the palace where the party is being held, and he manages to sneak in and find Leina. Unfortunately, Haman Kahn also is there, and senses his presence. She finds them, and shoots, hitting Leina in the stomach. Judau goes insane, and everyone around can feel his rage of his Newtype powers. Haman is terrified by his sheer power, and runs away, giving them a chance to escape in the Core fighter. She is later found crying because of this. As they evacuate, a giant airship appears, spewing out dozens of GM-III suits, which start destroying the enemy ms in the area. Unfortunately, with Leina condition worsening, the Core Fighter is shot down in the middle of the ocean, far out from the city.
28	"Leina's Blood (Part II)"; Transliteration: "Rīna no chi (Gō)" (Japanese: リィナの血 (後))	Kiyoshi Egami	Akinori Endō	September 13, 1986
This episode continues where the last one left off. Inside the city, the battle is still raging, but the Core Fighter has been washed up onto the shore of an island. Ple and Mondo find it, and while Mondo goes to get the medicine, Ple leads away Leina. She ends up trying to kill Leina, saying that she already has a brother and a family, but she herself had nobody. Judau appears on the scene, and stops them fighting, saying that they're all siblings together. Ple seems to accept this, and offers to take care of Leina while Judau goes off to help his friends, who are valiantly defending them from Glemy forces. Judau gets the ZZ transformed, and also helps to defend the island against the reinforcements, Team August, several Dreissen suits, who don't seem to mind who they hit, friend or foe alike. Ple, realizes that Leina has a fever, and so goes to wet a handkerchief to cool her down. During the fight, Glemy's escort, a woman in a Dowadge gets shot down, with the suit landing straight onto where Leina laid half asleep. It bursts into flames. Team August is overwhelmed by the AEUG, and they retreat, as does Haman's flagship, which is under pressure by the returning Argama. Judau rushes to the burnt out hut where Leina was, but there is nothing remaining apart from a burnt out shoe. Both he and Ple weep, but Roux tells him that they should go, because reinforcements from the enemy will be there any minute, throwing the shoe into the inferno, and telling him not to let her death be in vain. Ple tries to console him, "In the future, I could be your Leina", but he pushes her aside, as she starts crying harder.
29	"Runaway Roux"; Transliteration: "Rū no Tōbō" (Japanese: ルーの逃亡)	Hiroyuki Yokoyama	Hidemi Kamata	September 20, 1986
Judau is still upset about the death of his sister, and stays inside his shuttle. Roux gets him out violently, despite Ple trying to stop her. In the end, Ple realizes she can't replace Leina, but will try to be like a sister to him. He seems consoled, for the moment. In the MS deck, Beecha and Mondo argue with Roux, but then she runs off in the Core Fighter. On board the Axis command ship, Haman tells Glemy that she can handle the titans, and he should take care of the Kalaba Air Force before they can rendezvous with the AEUG. It seems that Team August, now led by Glemy, is not happy being under his command. The Argama receives a transmission about the impending attack on its base, and goes to help. Elle launches in the type-100, Beecha in the Gundam MkII, Yelai in the Core Lander, and Judau launches in the Core Base. Roux is also caught up in the fight which follows. Beecha uses Loux's Core Fighter as a shield, and is distracted by her, and gives the chance for Beecha to destroy the Bawwoo. Glemy escapes, only barely, but Roux blasts off and leaves him in the middle of the desert. Judau and the rest manage to fight off the other teams, but can't pursue, as they need to put out all the fires in the city nearby. Judau blames himself for Roux leaving, but Bright tells him not to take it so hard on himself. The episode ends as Glemy walks through the desert, and watches the Core Fighter fly off into the distance.
30	"Blue Team (Part I)"; Transliteration: "Ao no Butai (Zen)" (Japanese: 青の部隊 (前))	Shinji Takamatsu	Yumiko Suzuki	September 27, 1986
The episode opens with Roux touching down in her Core Fighter, and going in search of oil in a nearby city. With the help of a local man, she manages to get past the guards. He tells her he's an actor, and saw potential in her, and leads her to an underground city, similar to those on earth in the 1990s. On the Argama, Ple is causing trouble as usual, but hints to Judau that Roux is in the city. They decide to refuel there before the final push northward. On the road, Glemy is found by a group of MS, known as the Blue Team, of the North Africa Independence Forces, who want to get rid of the Franica (people who live in the underground city). They tell Glemy that if he can get to the control room in the city, they'll help him. He goes there, but runs into Roux. He beats up the man she's with, and runs off with her into the city. He talks to her for a while, but is distracted by the fight between the Blue Team and the AEUG outside. Roux walks off in disgust, and exits the city in a truck packed with containers of fuel. The fight eventually goes to the AEUG, and the Blue Team's leader's Gelgoog is shot down. Ple says she can feel Roux in the city (where she's just left), and tells Judau. They all go to the city to find her. Later on in the evening, Glemy and the rest of the team find the Gelgoog and the team leader, and he tells Glemy he is the true leader of Zeon, and he should fight for the honor of the Blue Team.
31	"Blue Team (Part II)"; Transliteration: "Ao no Butai (Kō)" (Japanese: 青の部隊 (後))	Osamu Sekita	Hidemi Kamata	October 4, 1986
Glemy takes command of the Blue Team and retunrns to city to scout it out, Judau, Elle, Ple, and Iino also return there in search of Roux, leaving there gundams hidden, albeit poorly. Soon other members of the Africa resistance begin destroying the city to full remove the foreign influence, influenced by August the acting commander of the Mindra, forcing the Blue Team to engage them as they oppose the destruction. The Gundam Team and Glemy flee, Glemy returns to the Mindra and scolds August for his actions and joins the battle, while Judau and the others reunite with Roux and move the gundams out to save the city. Glemy resumes command of the Blue Team and convinces the other resistance fighters to fight against the gundams, who soon arrive. Despite a good effort the resistance and the Blue Team are defeated, though Glemy survives thanks to one of his subordinates and retreats, questioning his own loyalty to Haman after seeing what Neo Zeon did to the city. The Gundam Team reunites with each other and apologize to Roux who accepts their apology, and the team goes to rendvouz with the Argama.
32	"Beyond the Salt Lake"; Transliteration: "Shio no Mizuumi o Koete" (Japanese: 塩の湖を越えて)	Kunihisa Sugishima	Akinori Endō	October 11, 1986
The Gundam team travels to rendezvous with the Argama, when they come across a salt lake and so decide to relax. The break is cut short however when August and his men attack them, but Judau fends them off, earning praise from the others, minus Beecha who begins to grow Jealous of Judau's growing popularity. On the Mindra, Glemy decides to defect from Haman, and convinces August to join him by showing him a clone of Ple, Ple Two. Bright is told the Argama's next destination is in Dublin when he and the ship are attacked by August, who intends to upsurt command of the Mindra from Glemy by succeeding. The Gundam team rushes to help the Argama, but Beecha hijacks the ZZ beforehand to up stage Judau, forcing Elle and Roux to cover him during the battle as he cannot properly pilot the ZZ. Judau has Bright launch the Hyaku Shiki, to which Judau sorties and defeats the enemies and kills August. The Gundam team reunites with the Argama and Beecha makes amends with Judau, on the Mindra Glemy is undeterred by August's defeat as he still has Ple Two.
33	"An Afternoon in Dublin"; Transliteration: "Daburin no Gogo" (Japanese: ダブリンの午後)	Takashi Imanishi	Yumiko Suzuki	October 18, 1986
As the Argama prepares to land in Dublin, Judau scolds Bright for going there, as he placed his job over seeing his family again, but Bright's response reminds Judau of Leina's death, causing a nearby Ple to flee the Argama, misinterpreting his thoughts as him wishing she was gone over Leina. Judau chases after her to explain, but the ship soon comes under attack from a Zeon squadron, but after Judau calms Ple down, she deals with them and the Argama lands in a forest to conceal themselves. While Bright goes to meet the Federation leaders, the Gundam team goes into town, except for Judau who decides to follow Bright. At the Federation mansion, Bright voices his disapproval of the Federation making a treaty with Haman, as it involved them giving her Side 3, the heart of Zeon. Bright argues that doing so will only encourage Haman to continue the war, but the Federation leaders say this will ensure peace as they have given back the Zeon capital, and also sneeringly remark that they will soon have the Argama decommissioned. Judau, who overheard everything, interrupts them and punches the head official for his disrespect of the Argama crew and their sacrifices as well as his foolishness in underestimating what a grave threat Haman is. As a result both Judau and Bright are imprisoned, just as the Zeon group that attacked the Argama earlier attack again, trying to smoke out the ship, killing some of the Federation officials in the process. As the Gundam team rushes back to defend the Argama a medical team is dispatched to aide the wounded, and among them is Fa Yuiry, who breaks Judau and Bright out of their confinement, surprising both with her sudden appearance.
34	"Kamille's Voice"; Transliteration: "Kamīyu no Koe" (Japanese: カミーユの声)	Toshifumi Kawase	Akinori Endō	October 25, 1986
While Fa takes Judau and Bright back to the Argama, she explains how she came to Earth and also reveals that Kamille is not only with her, but that he has recovered somewhat from his brain damage, though he is still unresponsive. When the battle begins to move close to the city, Fa must leave Judau and Bright, so to protect Kamille, the two understand and the three part ways. The Gundam team assembles and deals with the Zeon forces, but soon the mayor of the city and soldiers appear to apprehend the Argama for disrupting the peace. Fa soon returns, begging the Argama for help as Kamille has gone missing, so the Gundam team drives off the officials and split up with Fa to go find Kamille. Elsewhere, Glemy observes the mobile suit captured from the Titans, The Psyhco Gundam Mk II, and then has the same Zeon squad attack the Argama again, so Ple, in the Gundam Mk II, goes out to fight them. When she begins to have trouble with the enemy a mysterious voice guides her in the battle, and the same voice also calls out to Judau and the others to tell them of Ple's trouble. The Gundam team arrives to aid Ple and destroys the Zeon force. After the battle, Ple senses where the voice came from and guides the others to a lake, revealing that the person who was helping them was none other than Kamille.
35	"The Sky is Falling"; Transliteration: "Ochitekita Sora" (Japanese: 落ちてきた空)	Hiroyuki Yokoyama	Yumiko Suzuki	November 1, 1986
Judau and the crew of the Argama attempt to make contact with the Audhumula on their way to rendezvous with Karaba forces. They receive a transmission from Hayato Kobayashi, leader of Karaba and former shipmate of Captain Bright, informing the crew that Haman is attempting to drop a colony from side four onto the city of Dublin, and asks for their in helping the citizens evacuate. Kamille, in the infirmary of the Argama, can sense the impending danger of the drop and starts to have a minor convulsion. Rakan, stationed in Dublin, receives a sealed letter from Haman notifying him of the colony drop, and states that its purpose is to demonstrate Neo Zeon's power to the people of Earth. Hayato arrives on the Argama, and he and Bright visit Katz's old room while remembering his death at the Battle of Gryps. After Judau asks Hayato to let Fa and Kamille off the ship in Glasgow, Hayato refuses, and declares that the Earth Federation Forces are not intervening in the colony drop as a means of population control. Hayato finally remits and lets them go after Kamille projects an image of Katz into his mind. Rakhan and a team of Driessen mobile suits launch and attempt to make all routes out of the city impassible. The Argama and Karaba arrive and begin evacuating civilians while Judau and the others sortie in order to fight the enemy forces hindering the evacuation. As Judau and the others attempt to form Double Zeta, Rakhan attempts to destroy Judau's fighter, but is saved by Hayato shooting at Rakhan from a Dodai platform. Rakhan, in retaliation, shoots the Dodai and causes it to nosedive. Hayato claims he can hear Katz's voice, and the Dodai explodes above the water, killing him. Judau pursues Rakhan in the Double Zeta and attempts to shoot him down in retaliation for Hayato's death, but is ordered by the Argama to return in order to avoid being caught in the colony drop. The crew of the Argama then watches in horror as the colony impacts the city, sending out a massive shockwave and causing insurmountable destruction.
36	"Ple Two's Descent"; Transliteration: "Jūryokuka no Puru Tsū" (Japanese: 重力下のプルツー)	Shinji Takamatsu	Hidemi Kamata	November 8, 1986
In the aftermath of the colony drop, Dublin is left in ruin, with over hundreds dead. Judau hears the cries of pain and suffering and breaks down, but is then attacked by Rakan. The remainder of the Gundam team scout the area, and Glemy decides it is time to awaken Ple Two, and her awakening startles both Ple and Kamille. Judau's anger combined with his new-type powers forces Rakan to retreat, while Ple warns Bright of an approaching threat, which is Ple Two in the Psyco Gundam Mk II. The Argama fails to shoot her down so Ple confronts her in a still damaged Qubeley Mk II, with the two combatants reacting to each other's familiar Newtype presence. Ple Two dominates Ple until Judau arrives and sends Ple back to the Argama while he deals with the Psyco Gundam. The Gundam team find the Auduhmula with the rescued civilians safe, but find the crew dead, so they contact the Argama to rendezvous. Judau struggles against Ple Two, with the situation turning grimmer as the Double Zeta begins to run out of power, but is saved by a returning Ple who realizes that their opponent is a clone of herself, and reveals this to Ple Two, greatly surprising her. Wanting to save Judau, Ple summons all of her Newtype powers and kamikazes the Qubeley into the Psyco Gundam, killing her and badly damaging the Gundam, but Ple Two survives. Ple Two then prepares to finish Judau, but his anger and anguish at Ple's death allows him to activate the ZZ's bio sensor and destroy the Psyco Gundam, but Ple Two ejects. Judau continues his attack, but stops when he sees that the pilot looks exactly like Ple. Everyone reunites on the Argama and mourns the death of their allies and the civilians.
37	"Nahel Argama"; Transliteration: "Nēru Āgama" (Japanese: ネェル·アーガマ)	Kiyoshi Egami	Akinori Endō	November 15, 1986
It is revealed that since the colony drop was successful, Haman has returned to space, so the Argama crew does the same, leaving behind the Argama with Karaba. As they leave they are watched by some of their friends: a reunited Kamille and Fa, and, surprisingly, Bright's old subordinate Sayla Mass accompanied by a very much alive Leina Ashta. In Space the crew reunites with the La Vie en Rose and sees their new ship the Nahel Argama. Judau and co explore their new ship, while Bright meets with his superior; both Bright and the crew, who were eavesdropping, are shocked to hear that the Gundam team is to be decommissioned and Bright is to command the Nahel Argama with a new, more "professional" crew. Judau, Bright, and the crew adamantly refuse this as they have been through everything together and have proven themselves capable, but their accomplishments are denounced, with Judau and his friends being labeled as mere children. At that moment the Argama's old enemy, Mashymre Cello, along with his new ship and subordinate Illia Pazom attack. Illia leads the attack to destroy the new Argama in her ReGelg, so the Argama crew launches the Nahel Argama to draw fire away from the Rose. A direct hit to the ship causes Shinta, Qum, and some new pilots to be ejected from the ship, so Bright launches in a small vessel to save them while Judau launches in the ZZ to deal with Illia. Illia's fast mobile suit allows her to outmaneuver Judau, however they begin to react to each other's Newtype powers distracting her long enough for Judau to successfully execute a sneak attack. Illia survives and captures Judau's but his unorthodox strategy mixed with the continuous reaction of their Newtype powers, allows him to stall her long enough for Elle in the Mk II to damage her suit, forcing a retreat with the rest of her units. Back on board the Nahel Argama, the crew realizes that Bright has been through enough, and let him (along with Shinta, Qum, and Haro) stay with the La Vie en Rose, and they head out to face Haman, with Bright, believing in their skill and strength, wishes them luck and farewell.
38	"The Iron Wall of the Jamru Fin"; Transliteration: "Teppeki, Jamuru Fin" (Japanese: 鉄壁,ジャムル·フィン)	Osamu Sekita	Yumiko Suzuki	November 22, 1986
The Nahel Argama draws near to the Neo Zeon stronghold of Side 3. Heading to resupply them, Emary aboard the La Vie en Rose carelessly sends out an optical signal that gives away their position. This is picked up by the 3-D unit, subordinates of Mashymre piloting the new mobile armor Jamru Fin, who launch an attack.
39	"The Second Coming of Sarasa"; Transliteration: "Sarasa Sairin" (Japanese: サラサ再臨)	Takashi Imanishi	Hidemi Kamata	November 29, 1986
Heading for Side 3, the Nahel Argama rescues an old civilian transport being attacked by Zakus. Aboard the old transport is Sarasa and Rasara of the Light tribe. However, among the civilian refugees aboard are Neo Zeon soldiers and Haman in disguise, having secreted herself into the crowd in order to make contact with Judau.
40	"Tigerbaum's Dream"; Transliteration: "Taigābaumu no Yume" (Japanese: タイガーバウムの夢)	Toshifumi Kawase	Yumiko Suzuki	December 6, 1986
The Nahel Argama docks at the neutral colony Tigerbaum, which is controlled by the influential Stampa Halloi. Stampa takes Elle, Rasara, and other girls he likes for his harem. Judau and Iino disguise themselves as girls in order to infiltrate Stampa's estate and rescue them.
41	"Rasara's Life"; Transliteration: "Rasara no Inochi" (Japanese: ラサラの命)	Kunihisa Sugishima	Akinori Endō	December 13, 1986
Sensing Haman's evil mind, Sarasa and Rasara go into the colony with Mondo. But along the way, Stampa's Z'gok appears, and Rasara sacrifices herself to protect Mondo. Thinking that Haman was behind it, Judau marches into Stampa's estate.
42	"Core 3 Maiden (Part I)"; Transliteration: "Koa 3 no Shōjo (Zen)" (Japanese: コア3の少女 (前))	Hiroyuki Yokoyama	Yumiko Suzuki	December 20, 1986
Judau and the others infiltrate the docked mining asteroid Cicero in Core 3 sector. There they find Chara Soon commanding the workers. Although they join in a nascent revolt, the workers still don't entirely trust Judau. At the same time, Ple Two enters Cicero as well.
43	"Core 3 Maiden (Part II)"; Transliteration: "Koa 3 no Shōjo (Kō)" (Japanese: コア3の少女 (後))	Shinji Takamatsu	Akinori Endō	December 27, 1986
The Neo Zeon forces move in to put down the Cicero uprising. Ple Two moves out, having received orders from Glemy to assassinate Haman Karn. However, she lets the captive Lucina escape. A change has come over her personality. Judau rescues Elle and the others from Haman's mansion, then confronts Ple Two in the Qubeley Mk-II.
44	"Emary, Wilting Flower"; Transliteration: "Emarī Sange" (Japanese: エマリー散華)	Kiyoshi Egami	Yumiko Suzuki; Yoshiyuki Tomino	January 10, 1987
Using the revolt against Haman to take control of Axis, Glemy battles Chara's fleet. Judau and Roux use the chance to sneak into Core 3 in order to kidnap Mineva, but fail. As the Nahel Argama appears to be supporting Haman's side, Ple Two approaches in the new mobile armor Queen Mansa.
45	"The Battle of Axis"; Transliteration: "Akushizu no Sentō" (Japanese: アクシズの戦闘)	Osamu Sekita	Hidemi Kamata	January 17, 1987
The final battle begins between Haman's forces with Mashymre and Glemy's. The Nahel Argama, taking this chance to first strike at Glemy, launches the Gundam team. Amidst the free-for-all, Mashymre in a Zaku III Custom loses control of his overenhanced mental powers and is lost to the stars.
46	"Vibration"; Transliteration: "Baiburēshon" (Japanese: バイブレーション)	Toshifumi Kawase	Akinori Endō	January 24, 1987
Glemy plays his trump card and sends his Newtype unit into battle. He then makes to smash Axis's asteroid Moussa into Haman's fleet. Judau chases the now mentally unstable Ple Two into Axis and confronts both Glemy and Ple Two in the Queen Mansa.
47	"Warrior, Once More..."; Transliteration: "Senshi, Futatabi......" (Japanese: 戦士, 再び......)	Kunihisa Sugishima	Akinori Endō; Yoshiyuki Tomino	January 31, 1987
Hoping that a one-on-one battle with Haman will end the conflict, Judau launches in the Double Zeta. Haman too flies out to meet him alone in her white Qubeley. In the face of the Qubeley's furious assault, Judau's back is pushed to the wall. But protected by the wills of many people, he rises to face Haman.
