= Mobile Suit Gundam ZZ =

Japanese anime television series

- 機動戦士ガンダムΖΖ
- Genre: Mecha, military science fiction, space opera
- Created by: Hajime Yatate (concept); Yoshiyuki Tomino (story)
- Directed by: Yoshiyuki Tomino (chief)
- Music by: Shigeaki Saegusa
- Country of origin: Japan
- Original language: Japanese
- No. of episodes: 47 (list of episodes)

Production
- Producers: Juichi Kamiya (Nagoya TV); Mitsushige Inagaki (Sotsu Agency); Kenji Uchida (Nippon Sunrise)
- Production companies: Nagoya TV; Sotsu Agency; Nippon Sunrise

Original release
- Network: ANN (Nagoya TV, TV Asahi)
- Release: March 1, 1986 – January 31, 1987

Mobile Suit Gundam ZZ (Japanese: 機動戦士ガンダムΖΖ(ダブルゼータ), Hepburn: Kidō Senshi Gandamu Daburu Zēta; Mobile Suit Gundam Double Zeta) is the third installment in Sunrise's long running Gundam franchise and the last TV series in the franchise released in Japan's Shōwa period. A direct follow up to Mobile Suit Zeta Gundam, it is directed and written by Yoshiyuki Tomino, and he assembled a new team consisting of character designer Hiroyuki Kitazume, who had been one of Zeta Gundam's animation directors, and mechanical designers Makoto Kobayashi, Yutaka Izubuchi and Mika Akitaka. Initially airing on Nagoya Broadcasting Network and affiliated ANN stations in Japan, the series was later aired by the anime satellite television network Animax across Japan and its respective networks worldwide, including Southeast Asia, Hong Kong, South Asia, and other regions. The now-defunct video streaming website Daisuki had the rights to stream the series worldwide. Sunrise themselves released the series on home video via Right Stuf Inc. to North America in 2015. On June 24, 2022, the series was made available for streaming on Crunchyroll.

Picking up directly after the events of Zeta Gundam, the story deals with the aftermath of the Gryps Conflict, with AEUG winning the war over the Federation-backed Titans at the expense of numerous casualties, including most of their personnel. This results in the revival of the Zeon forces, who once again declare war on the weakened Earth Federation. In response, the AEUG selects a scrap collector, Judau Ashta, to take over Kamille's position as the new pilot of the Zeta Gundam.

== Overview ==
Gundam ZZ was conceived as a sequel to Zeta Gundam, featuring a mostly all-new cast. Its broadcast immediately followed that of Zeta Gundam and continues to follow a major plotline from Zeta involving Haman Karn, regent to Mineva Lao Zabi, and also continues to follow Captain Bright Noa and the ship, Argama, as well as introducing the new characters led by Judau Ashta.

This sequel to Zeta Gundam sometimes struck a much lighter, often comical, tone, in contrast to its predecessor's brooding drama. For example, in the second episode, the protagonist Judau Ashta attempts to help Yazan Gable by throwing oranges at the Argama. This is contrasted in the same episode however when Yazan kills the technician Saegusa, and Judau then attempts to pilot the Zeta Gundam to go after Yazan but is incredibly poor at combat in his first battle. The whimsical first opening theme song Anime Ja Nai (lit. "It's Not Anime") set the tone for the first half of the series. The second half of the series sports a more somber opening theme song Silent Voice to accompany a change in tone to the more serious.

== Plot summary ==
As the continuation of Mobile Suit Zeta Gundam, this series once again follows the story of the Anti Earth Union Group (AEUG) battleship Argama after Mobile Suit Zeta Gundam's final episode. To fight off the Axis Zeon, now called the Neo Zeon, Captain Bright Noa recruits a group of teenage junk collectors led by the loudmouthed but powerful Newtype Judau Ashta to pilot the Argama's mobile suits. Now sporting a line-up of the behemoth ZZ Gundam and the returning Zeta Gundam, Gundam Mk-II and the Hyaku Shiki, the group is nicknamed the Gundam Team. As such, this became the first of a number of Gundam series where a team of Gundam mobile suits fight alongside each other regularly. The climax takes place at Side 3 in the Battle of Axis.

Out of the major Mobile Suit Zeta Gundam characters, Captain Bright Noa and Axis leader Haman Karn are featured prominently in Mobile Suit Gundam ZZ; Hayato Kobayashi, Kamille Bidan, Fa Yuiry, Wong Lee, Yazan Gable, Mineva Lao Zabi, and the children Shinta and Qum are featured in various episodes as well; Sayla Mass, who had appeared in the first series but had no speaking role in Mobile Suit Zeta Gundam, also appeared in several episodes of Mobile Suit Gundam ZZ; Char Aznable's planned appearance was canceled when Tomino was given the go-ahead to do the Mobile Suit Gundam: Char's Counterattack film. Yoshiyuki Tomino's original plan for the show which involved Char's return was never revealed, nor does Tomino himself remember it. Also, aside from the openings and story recap/preview episode, Amuro Ray does not make an appearance in the series either.

== Reception ==
The series remains one of the more polarizing series in the franchise due to the lighthearted and campy tone of the first half of the series when compared to Zeta Gundam's grittier tone. In 2016, to coincide with the show's Blu-Ray release, Ollie Barder of Forbes referred to Gundam ZZ as a "misunderstood and underappreciated classic." James Whitbrook of Gizmodo called Gundam ZZ "the black sheep of early Gundam", citing the show's early comedic tone in comparison to the dark ending of its predecessor.

Preceded by Mobile Suit Zeta Gundam	Gundam metaseries (production order); 1986–1987	Succeeded by Mobile Suit Gundam: Char's Counterattack
Preceded by Mobile Suit Zeta Gundam	Gundam Universal Century timeline U.C. 0088-89	Succeeded by Mobile Suit Gundam: Char's Counterattack
