= List of Mobile Suit Zeta Gundam characters =

Major characters

Mobile Suit Zeta Gundam is a Japanese science fiction anime television series that originally aired on Nagoya Broadcasting Network between March 2, 1985, and February 22, 1986. Mobile Suit Zeta Gundam featured many new characters and several returning characters from the earlier Mobile Suit Gundam anime television series.

== Protagonists ==
=== A.E.U.G ===
Kamille Bidan (カミーユ・ビダン, Kamīyu Bidan)

The protagonist of Mobile Suit Zeta Gundam, Kamille Bidan is a troubled teen who has become estranged from his parents, both mobile suit developers. A scuffle with Titans officer Jerid Messa over his female-sounding name begins a series of events that eventually results in Kamille helping Quattro Bajeena to steal the RX-178 Gundam Mk-II prototypes and the deaths of both of his parents. Under the tutelage of Quattro and former Titans officer Emma Sheen, Kamille later became one of AEUG's top pilots during the Gryps Conflict—first using the stolen Gundam Mk-II and later in his personally designed Zeta Gundam. Over the course of the series, Kamille's rivalry with Jerid intensifies as both end up killing friends and loved ones of the other. One such example is the cyber-Newtype Four Murasame, whom Kamille met while in Hong Kong and fell in love with. When the two reunite at the Battle of Kilimanjaro, Four is killed by Jerid while attempting to save Kamille's life. Although Kamille survives the Gryps Conflict, the battle with Paptimus Scirocco leaves him in a near comatose state. According to Tomino, Kamille has the strongest Newtype powers in the series.
Kamille, along with five other notable mecha and pilots from the various Gundam series, were recognized in the second set of "Anime Heroes and Heroines" stamps, released in Japan in 2005. In an interview for the laserdisc release of Zeta Gundam, Tomino states that Kamille was named and modeled after Camille Claudel, a sculptor and lover of Auguste Rodin who became deranged and ended her life in commitment. In the Animage Anime Grand Prix poll from 1986 Kamille was voted the first most popular male anime character. He has also been voted as the eighth most popular male character from the 1980s by Newtype readers. Kamille Bidan is voiced by Nobuo Tobita in Japanese and Jonathan Lachlan-Stewart in English.
Fa Yuiry (ファ・ユイリィ, Fa Yuirī)

Fa Yuiry is the next-door neighbor of Kamille Bidan before the Gryps Conflict begins. After Kamille helps the AEUG officer Quattro Bajeena steal two Gundam Mk-II prototypes, the Titans arrest Fa's parents because of her close association with Kamille. Fa escapes with the help of Bright Noa and reunites with Kamille when Bright's shuttle is rescued by the AEUG ship Argama. Having sided with the AEUG, Fa stays on the Argama and becomes the pilot of the Methuss, rotating with Reccoa Londe. She also becomes a surrogate mother to two war orphans, Shinta and Qum, after they are sent to the Argama by Lt. Quattro. Fa and Kamille constantly quarrel with each other, so much so that the crew of the Argama refers to the quarreling as their hobby. However, Fa becomes jealous whenever Kamille shows an interest in another female. Fa is one of the few characters that survive the Gryps Conflict and even rescues Kamille after his last encounter with Paptimus Scirocco. In the anime television series, Fa Yuiry is voiced by Miyuki Matsuoka in Japanese and Angie Beers in English. In the anime film, she is voiced by Satomi Arai.
Quattro Bajeena (クワトロ・バジーナ, Kuwatoro Bajīna; aka Char Aznable)

"Quattro" (Number 4 in Italian) as Casval Deikun's fourth alias name

No longer wearing a mask, Char Aznable returns to the Earth Sphere and infiltrates the Earth Federation Forces using the humorous alias "Quattro Bajeena", which can be romanized as quarter vagina in reference to the James Bond film Octopussy. Char joins with other Federation officers, including former enemies such as Amuro Ray and Bright Noa, and becomes one of the top pilots of the AEUG. Char serves as Kamille Bidan's mentor in the war against the Earth Federation's oppressive Titans organization.
Despite repeating prodding of his comrades, Char refuses to take a leadership position within the AEUG maintaining his Quattro facade and stating that he is merely a pilot. However, this changes after the death of Four Murasame when Kamille states that he will no longer refer to him as Quattro Bajeena. Char's political speech in front of Federation Assembly in Dakar, which is broadcast throughout Earth and Space, is one of the most important events in the UC Gundam timeline. It seals Char's total commitment toward space colonization and migration of humanity to space. Despite AEUG's victory in the Gryps Conflict against the Titans, Char is defeated in the final battle by Haman Karn, leader of the Axis faction and assumed dead. However, as the final credits roll, Char's damaged Hyaku Shiki floats by with its cockpit hatch open. Quattro Bajeena is voiced by Shūichi Ikeda in Japanese and Tom Edwards in English.
Emma Sheen (エマ・シーン, Ema Shīn)
Lieutenant Junior Grade Emma Sheen is a former Titan pilot who defected to the AEUG after witnessing firsthand the cruel tactics of Bask Om. She is initially placed on provisional status, but it does not take long for her to prove herself in the eyes of the Argama crew. Emma first pilots the Rick Dias for the AEUG, and then Kamille's old repainted Gundam Mk-II after Kamille transfers to the Zeta Gundam. Emma meets her end when she is caught in an explosion caused by Yazan Gable and fatally injured by shrapnel. Emma would soon be retrieved by Kamille, but she then dies in his arms. Emma Sheen is voiced by Maya Okamoto in Japanese and Lisa Christie in English.
Bright Noa (ブライト・ノア, Buraito Noa)
Former captain of White Base during the One Year War, Bright, like most of his comrades, was alienated by the Earth Federal Space Forces. He was assigned to captain the shuttle spacecraft Temptation. He gets beaten up by Bask Om and several other Titans officers when he objects to a set of orders coming from him. Bright defects to the AEUG to aid their struggle against the Titans. Considering his veteran experience in mobile suit warfare, AEUG then commissions Bright as captain of the AEUG spaceship Argama. Bright finds himself working with his former adversary, Char Aznable and later they form the core military leadership of AEUG. Several highlights of Bright's tour of duty above Argama are the attack on Federation Headquarters at Jaburo and Kilimanjaro, Operation Maelstrom, and the final three-way battle between the fleet of AEUG, Titans, and Axis near the Gryps Two space colony. After the climactic battle at Gryps Two, the AEUG fleet is left crippled with Bright being the sole experienced military commander within the ranks of AEUG leaders. Bright Noa is voiced by Hirotaka Suzuoki in Japanese and Dave Kelly in English.
Apolly Bay (アポリー・ベイ, Aporī Bei)
Lieutenant Junior Grade Apolly Bay is initially one of two wingmates to Quattro Bajeena. He later becomes chief of the AEUG ship Argama's Rick Dias team. Apolly is an experienced soldier who provides valuable support to his fellow pilots and a dose of wit as well. He is killed by Jerid Messa when he takes a shot that was meant for Fa Yuiry. The rest of the Argama crew are visibly saddened after his death. Apolly Bay is voiced by Hiroyuki Shibamoto in Japanese and Scott Roberts in English. In the anime film, he is voiced by Toru Ohkawa.
Roberto (ロベルト, Roberuto)
Lieutenant J.G. Roberto is the second wingmate first seen entering the colony with Quattro and Apolly to acquire information about the Gundam Mk-II prototypes. He also pilots a RMS-099 Rick Dias. Roberto is seen as more serious and diligent than the wise cracking Apolly. He dies during an attack by Titans ace Buran Blutarch while helping Kamille and Quattro ensure that a space shuttle transporting Apolly and several other AEUG pilots back into space. Apolly witnesses his death from a distance and chokes back tears just as the shuttle launches. Roberto is voiced by Kôzô Shioya in Japanese and Tommy James in English.
Blex Forer (ブレックス・フォーラ, Burekkusu Fōra)
Commodore Blex Forer is the initial leader of the AEUG. With the formation of the Titans after Operation Stardust, Blex was one of the first to see the increasing corruption in the Earth Government. He used his senatorial position as Commodore in the Federal Navy to influence certain executives of Anaheim Electronics to fund an anti-government movement. Anaheim, whose business interests were partially disrupted by the trade embargoes placed by the Federation on the colonies saw this as feasible. Thus Blex Forer became the founder of the Anti Earth Union Group or AEUG. Blex Forer would continuously clash wills with Titans leaders Jamitov Hymem and Bask Om in their brutal tactics against spacenoids. Blex operated from the ad-hoc flagship of the AEUG, the Argama, closely working with Henken Bekkener as co-captain. Blex meets his end in Dakar when he is assassinated in his hotel room. Blex, with his dying words, beseeches Quattro Bajeena to assume his rightful name of Char Aznable and take on leadership of AEUG. In the anime television series, Blex Forer is voiced by Takaya Tōdō in Japanese and Byron Close in English. In the anime film, he is voiced by Kōji Ishii.
Henken Bekkener (ヘンケン・ベッケナー, Henken Bekkenā)
Henken, a ship captain in the AEUG is first seen in command of the Argama. He works closely with Quattro Bagina and AEUG founder Blex Forra. A tall, burly, jovial and good natured man, he nonetheless takes his job seriously and even turns over command of Argama to Bright Noa, acknowledging Bright's professional experience. Henken subsequently transfers to the Irish-class battleship Radish. Henken is attracted to Emma Sheen and Emma shyly but good naturedly reciprocates the affection somewhat. Henken is killed in battle when he maneuvers the Radish to draw Yazan Gable's fire from Emma. Henken Bekkener is voiced by Jūrōta Kosugi in Japanese and David Pettitt in English.
Reccoa Londe (レコア・ロンド, Rekoa Rondo)
Ensign Reccoa Londe is a former guerilla fighter from the One Year War who later joined the AEUG in their fight against the Titans. A skilled pilot and spy, she also helped AEUG newcomer Kamille Bidan adjust to his new position aboard Argama. She was also one of the first to welcome Titans defector Emma Sheen despite widespread suspicions and helps her realize that she made the right choice; most notably by proving to her that the infamous 30-Bunch incident (where an entire colony was killed by poison gas) was carried out by none other than Colonel Bask Om of the Titans.
Lonely and ignored by her love Quattro, Reccoa later does the opposite of Lieutenant Emma and joins the Titans due to the influence of Paptimus Scirocco. She even goes so far as to lead a mission using poison gas to exterminate another colony as ordered by Bask, whom she later kills. Reccoa is killed by the combined efforts of Emma Sheen and Yazan Gable. Reccoa Londe is voiced by Masako Katsuki in Japanese and Meredith Taylor-Parry in English.
Katz Kobayashi (カツ・コバヤシ, Katsu Kobayashi)
Katz was one of the three war orphans aboard the White Base during the One Year War that were later adopted by Hayato Kobayashi and Fraw Bow. He along with his adoptive mother and siblings pay Amuro Ray a visit. Katz is initially disgusted by what he perceived as his former hero's cowardice and made that perfectly clear to him. However, he and Amuro later join up with Hayato along with some other members of Karaba and the AEUG on board the Audhumla and later he goes up into space with Quattro Bajeena. Katz shows some skill as a pilot and helps save the plight of his fellow pilots on numerous occasions. However, his naivete and recklessness makes him a thorn in the side of his superiors and led to his downfall. He constantly defies his superior officers by sortieing without their permission.
Katz develops an interest in Sarah Zabiarov after she boards the Argama to warn them about an impending colony drop. Despite the fact that she initially deceives him in order to escape, Katz still harbors feelings for Sarah and hopes to free her from Scirocco's influence. Katz is killed when Yazan Gable shoots him down in the G-Defenser. In the anime television series, Katz Kobayashi is voiced by Keiichi Nanba in Japanese and Sean Broadhurst in English. In the anime film, he is voiced by Daisuke Namikawa.
Wong Lee (ウォン・リー, Won Rī)

Wong Lee is a top official at Anaheim Electronics Company, which is the equity participant of AEUG. Although he is a civilian, he takes it upon himself to assault Kamille, who was occupied with repair of Haro and was late for the meeting as a punishment for him breaking military rules. After that he got in Argama, made orders carpingly to Bright Noa and Quattro Bajeena. Bright becomes fed up with Wong when he tried to communicate with Reccoa during a battle and orders him to sit down. Wong grudgingly yields to Bright in the end and leaves the Argama after it stops at La Vie En Rose for resupply. In the anime television series, Wong Lee is voiced by Yukimasa Natori in Japanese and Dean Galloway in English. In the anime film, he is voiced by Kazumi Tanaka.

=== Karaba ===
Amuro Ray (アムロ・レイ, Amuro Rei)
The famous pilot of the original RX-78-2 Gundam during the One Year War. Amuro was placed under house arrest shortly after the war due to the government's mistrust of Newtypes. While he lived in a luxurious mansion and was officially free to come and go as he pleased, Amuro's house servants were actually government agents assigned to keep track of his movements. Amuro worked as a trainer/adviser in the Cheyenne Mobile Suit Academy up until the time of the Gryps Conflict. He suffers from chronic combat fatigue, as commented by Emma Sheen and Beltorchika Irma, likely from his traumatic experience during the One Year War and the sense of guilt over killing Lalah Sune.
During the Gryps Conflict, a pregnant Fraw Bow and her three adopted children (Katz, Letz, and Kikka) come to visit Amuro. They manage to re-ignite Amuro's fighting spirit and help him escape from his government handlers. After joining Karaba, AEUG's earth-bound ally, and some initial hostility with Quattro/Char, Amuro becomes a key figure within the group, leading several crucial missions including the attack on the Titans' base in Mount Kilimanjaro and the seizing of Federation's Congress Building in Dakar. Amuro Ray is voiced by Tōru Furuya in Japanese and Matthew Erickson in English.
Kai Shiden (カイ・シデン)
Former crew member of the White Base and pilot of the RX-77 Guncannon during the One Year War, now a freelance journalist. Kai helps Reccoa Londe infiltrate the Jaburo base but ends up getting them both captured. Luckily, the two of them are later rescued by Kamille. he promptly vanishes after leaving a message for Hayato and Amuro informing them that Quattro Bajeena is actually Char Aznable. Kai Shiden is voiced by Toshio Furukawa in Japanese and Scott Roberts in English.
Hayato Kobayashi (ハヤト・コバヤシ)
Another former crew member of the White Base and pilot of the RX-75 Guntank during the One Year War, Hayato Kobayashi is now married to Fraw Bow and the adoptive father of Katz, Letz, and Kikka. He is the owner of the Kennedy Space Museum and leader of the Earth-based anti-Titans group, Karaba. In the anime television series, Hayato Kobayashi is voiced by Kiyonobu Suzuki in Japanese and C. Adam Leigh in English. In the anime film, he is voiced by Nobuyuki Hiyama.
Beltorchika Irma (ベルトーチカ・イルマ, Berutōchika Iruma)
A member of the Earth-based anti-Titans group, Karaba, who joins up with the Audhumla while en route to Hong Kong City. Upon meeting Amuro Ray, Beltorchika takes an immediate interest and latches onto him, much to the chagrin of her comrades, especially Kamille. Beltorchika later plays a crucial role in the Battle of Dakar. At one point, the Titans try to stop this speech regardless of the safety of the people at the summit, including their own supporters. Beltorchika captures this on video, revealing the Titans' brutality to the whole world. After the battle, Beltorchika and Kamille engage in their friendliest conversation yet. She is last seen manning a gun turret on the Audhumla as Kamille and Char make their way back into space.
Beltorchika and Amuro appear to be on the brink of a serious relationship, but he is later seen with someone else named Chan Agi in Char's Counterattack. No explanation as to what might have happened between him and Beltorchika is provided in the film. However, Yoshiyuki Tomino penned a novelized version of the film titled Beltorchika's Children. In this, Beltorchika acts in the same role that Chan does; however, in the book, she is pregnant with Amuro's child and survives the events of the novel. Beltorchika Irma is voiced by Maria Kawamura in Japanese and Kris Rundle in English.

== Antagonists ==
=== Titans ===
Jerid Messa (ジェリド・メサ, Jerido Mesa)
Lieutenant Jerid Messa is the archrival of protagonist Kamille Bidan. Their rivalry began over a mere scuffle that was instigated when Jerid made fun of Kamille for being a boy with a girl's name. It intensifies later when Jerid kills Kamille's mother while she is being held captive inside a capsule that he believed was a bomb, which would have destroyed the Gundam Mk-II that Kamille was piloting. Throughout the rest of the series, the two of them are constantly at odds with each other, killing several other friends and loved ones until Kamille finally kills Jerid during the decisive final Battle of Gryps. Before that happened, however, Jerid piloted several different mobile suits and displayed superb battle skills as he began to unlock his Newtype potential as witnessed when he attacks the Axis flagship Gwadon during the fall of the Gate of Zedan. Haman Khan, a powerful Newtype, senses a psychic pressure emanating from him as he approaches her ship in retaliation for her attempt to assassinate Jamitov Hymem. Also in his final battle Jerid piloted a Baund Doc, which is a mobile suit designed exclusively for Newtypes. However, he is still unable to gain the upper hand against Kamille and winds up losing to him in their final battle, being sent flying into the exploding battleship Radish. With his last breath, Jerid curses Kamille's existence, as a barrier to his ascension in the ranks of the Titans. Jerid Messa is voiced by Kazuhiko Inoue in Japanese and Ethan Cole in English.
Paptimus Scirocco (パプテマス・シロッコ, Paputimasu Shirokko)
Paptimus Scirocco, known as "the man from Jupiter", is a very powerful Newtype summoned by the Titans for his excellent piloting and mechanical skills who quickly rises to the top of the Titans' leadership, making him the primary antagonist of the series. He also exhibits great charisma, which allows him to easily manipulate people, and with his charms he especially seems to influence women, such as Reccoa Londe and Sarah Zabiarov. Reccoa would eventually betray the AEUG due to his influence and Sarah would later sacrifice herself by taking a blow that was meant for him.
Throughout the course of the series, Scirocco along with his minions executed all kinds of underhanded plots to help him assume control over the Titans and eventually the Earth Sphere. When Jamaican Daninghan attempts to drop a colony on the lunar city Granada, he sends Sarah to the Argama and alert the AEUG so that they can successfully thwart Jamaican's plan. He inexplicably allows Reccoa to leave his ship Jupitris after sensing that she was a spy, an act that continues to dog Reccoa until she finally defects from the AEUG and joins him. He also successfully forges a brief alliance with Axis, but Haman Karn later disables the Gryps 2 Colony Laser and sends the Axis asteroid flying into the Titans' stronghold at the Gate of Zedan. Eventually, Scirocco pulls off a coup d'etat by assassinating Jamitov and blaming Haman for it.
In his final appearance, Scirocco fights a four-way battle with Kamille, Char, and Haman that ultimately leads to him fighting Kamille alone. Towards the end of this fight, Kamille calls upon the spirits of several other characters, AEUG and Titan alike, to lend him their strength in order to defeat Scirocco. The power exhibited by the bio-sensor system of Kamille's Zeta Gundam causes the control of Scirocco's mobile suit PMX-003 The O (which is also equipped with a bio-sensor) to be overridden. Kamille quickly transform the Zeta into its Waverider form and rams it into The O, impaling Scirocco on the top. However there are two versions of the events that occur in the next few minutes. In the TV version, Scirocco vows he will not die alone and uses his last ounce of strength to deliver a crippling blow that leaves Kamille comatose. However, the movie version scraps this entire sequence. Paptimus Scirocco is voiced by Bin Shimada in Japanese and Jonathan Love in English.
Four Murasame (フォウ・ムラサメ, Fō Murasame)
Ensign Four Murasame is the fourth artificially-enhanced cyber-Newtype trained by Murasame Research Lab and pilot of Psyco Gundam. The scientist in charge of the project erased all her memories from her previous life and just gave her number 'Four' as the name. Namikar Cornell, the nurse in charge of her, convinced her that working with the Titans and fighting the AEUG was the only way that she could recover her memories. Four first appears when the Karaba transport ship Audhumla is docked in New Hong Kong for supplies. Here, she meets AEUG pilot Kamille Bidan, and not knowing that he is an enemy, she feels bonded to him, since he is the first person who ever regarded Four as a person in her own right and not as a girl without memories who is bound to become a living weapon. It is only after the truth regarding Kamille is revealed to Four that she chooses to pilot the giant Psyco Gundam and attack both Kamille and the city; her desire of getting her memories back and become a full-fledged person is more important than anything. Kamille desperately tries to calm her down and make her join the AEUG, but to no avail. After the battle, Four helps Kamille and his Gundam Mark II back out into space. During this event, the Psyco Gundam is severely damaged and Four is killed by her superior officer.
However, it was later revealed that Four and the Psyco Gundam survive and are taken to the Titans' Kilimanjaro base in Africa. Once there, the Psyco Gundam is repaired and equipped with an experimental new "psyco-control chair", further enhancing Four's abilities to control the Psyco Gundam. Furthermore, Four is forced once again to undergo medical experiments in order to increase her powers, almost losing her memories of Kamille. In the beginning of November, UC 0087, the AEUG and Karaba launch an attack on the Titans base at Mount Kilimanjaro in Africa. Led by Amuro Ray, they are also supported by Kamille Bidan and Quattro Bajeena. It is then that Kamille discovers that Four is still alive. Four finally remembers Kamille when he infiltrates the Titans base to save her. Four is glad to see him, but the backlash coming from her treatment as well as her own mental instability become a huge hindrance. In the end, Four is forced once again to fight against Kamille in the Psyco Gundam, but eventually sacrifices herself to save Kamille from Jerid Messa.
The second Zeta Gundam compilation movie "Lovers" covers Four's first encounter with Kamille and her death while helping him escape into space. Since the Karaba raid is not covered in the films, her reappearance, along with the Psyco Gundam Mk II, is not shown. Four Murasame is voiced by Saeko Shimazu in Japanese and Carol-Anne Day in English. In the anime film, she is voiced by Yukana.
Yazan Gable (ヤザン・ゲーブル, Yazan Gēburu)

Lt. Commander Yazan Gable is a cunning and vicious Titan pilot who ascends the ranks through pure skill and power; he does not exhibit any Newtype potential unlike Jerid Messa. Nevertheless, he single-handedly kills more AEUG members than any other Titan pilot during the Battle of Gryps, including Henken Bekkener, Katz Kobayashi, and Emma Sheen. His brutal actions also seal the fates of fellow Titan officers like Jamaican Daninghan, Jerid Messa, and Reccoa Londe. In the movie, he ends up killing Bask Om instead of Reccoa. His ruthless actions anger Kamille Bidan and prompt him to tap into his Newtype abilities in order to defeat Yazan by destroying his Hambrabi. However, Yazan escapes by ejecting in his escape pod. Yazan Gable is voiced by Hōchū Ōtsuka in Japanese and Corby Proctor in English.
Sarah Zabiarov (サラ・ザビアロフ, Sara Zabiarofu)
Chief Petty Officer Sarah Zabiarov is a former cadet at the Titans' private Newtype laboratory whose talents caught the attention of Paptimus Scirocco, who quickly recruited her to serve in combat against the AEUG. Although she is a member of the Titans and is fiercely loyal to the scheming Paptimus Scirocco, she still retains a good heart and conscience, which causes her to empathize with the AEUG. Unfortunately, her devotion to Scirocco turns to obsession and it causes Sarah to suffer the same fate as Lalah Sune during the One Year War.
Throughout the series, Sarah undertakes all kinds of tasks to destroy the Argama and the Zeta Gundam, including planting a bomb that would also kill hundreds, maybe thousands, of innocent civilians while the ship is docked in a space port. Still, Sarah is visibly moved by the kindness that Katz Kobayashi shows toward her even after deceiving him. However, it is not enough to free her from her superior's influence as she ends up getting killed by Katz when she takes a shot that is meant for Scirocco. In the anime television series, Sarah Zabiarov is voiced by Yūko Mizutani in Japanese and Maizun Jayoussi in English. In the anime film, she is voiced by Chizuru Ikewaki and Kaori Shimamura.
Bask Om (バスク・オム, Basuku Omu)
Captain Bask Om is the field commander of the Titans and oversees a lot of the dirty work in their overzealous quest to maintain control over all Spacenoids in light of the events that took place during the One Year War and Operation Stardust. Throughout his tenure, Bask shamelessly orders his subordinates to commit mass murder by gassing entire colonies or firing the Titans' deadly superweapon, the Gryps 2 colony laser. He also used Kamille Bidan's parents as hostages in order to convince the AEUG to return the Gundam Mark II prototypes that they stole from the Titans' headquarters at Green Noa II. After the death of Jamitov Hymem at the hands of Paptimus Scirocco, Bask stood as the only obstacle preventing the latter from acquiring complete control over the Titans. He met his end when Reccoa and several other minions of Scirocco attacked his ship, the Dogosse Giar, while they were executing a mission with Rosamia Badam piloting the MRX-010 Psyco Gundam Mk-II. Due to all the confusion, Bask and his men were easily overwhelmed and defeated when Reccoa destroyed the Dogosse Giar with a direct shot at the bridge, killing Bask. In the movie trilogy, Bask is killed by Yazan Gable instead of Reccoa during the battle between AEUG, Titans, and Axis. Bask Om is voiced by Daisuke Gōri in Japanese and Noah Umholtz in English.
Mouar Pharaoh (マウアー・ファラオ, Mauā Farao)
Ensign Mouar Pharaoh is a Titan pilot who first appeared at the Battle of Jaburo, where she saved Jerid from the forthcoming nuclear explosion by grabbing hold of his arm just as the overcrowded escape vessel was about to take off and leave him behind. She takes an immediate dislike to Paptimus Scirocco who attempts to seduce her. She and Jerid, however later become lovers. Mouar is fiercely devoted to Jerid and she relentlessly attacks Kamille or anybody else from the AEUG should they gain the upper hand while fighting against him. In her final battle, Mouar jumps in her front of Jerid in order to save him when Kamille fires a shot him with his Zeta Gundam and dies when her Gabthley explodes. Having lost yet another close friend to Kamille, her death causes Jerid to go berserk and begin a relentless attack on the Argama, causing more damage to it than he had up to this point. In the anime television series, Mouar Pharaoh is voiced by Yoshiko Sakakibara in Japanese and Jennifer Holder in English. In the anime film, she is voiced by Marika Hayashi.
Jamaican Daninghan (ジャマイカン・ダニンガン, Jamaikan Daningan)
Lieutenant Commander Jamaican Daninghan is an arrogant Titan staff officer whose smug and condescending attitude alienates the soldiers under his command. Assigned to pursue the AEUG ship Argama after they steal the Gundam Mark-II prototype mobile suits, Jamaican takes command of the cruiser Alexandria and chases the Argama back and forth across the Earth Sphere. However, many of his plans are undermined by fellow Titan Paptimus Scirocco, who is craftily planning his own rise to the top. Jamaican is killed when Yazan lures the Gundam Mark-II to the Alexandria and Emma Sheen destroys the bridge. Jamaican Daninghan is voiced by Keaton Yamada in Japanese and Roger Rhodes in English.
Jamitov Hymem (ジャミトフ・ハイマン, Jamitofu Haiman)
Jamitov Hymem is the leader of the Earth Federation's counter-insurgent organization known as the Titans, which were formed with the stated purpose of eliminating the remnants of Zeon in light of the events that took place during the One Year War and Operation Stardust. Jamitov deviously arranges the assassination of Commodore Blex Forer, allowing him to convince the Federation Council to hand over full control of the Federation Forces to the Titans. He later appears at the Titans headquarters in Kilimanjaro right when it is under attack by the AEUG and Karaba. Although the AEUG and Karaba eventually overwhelm the Titans and destroy their base, Jamitov successfully launches back out into space. Later at the Gate of Zedan, Jamitov prepares to meet with Haman Karn, the leader of Axis, who attempts to assassinate him after revealing that the Axis asteroid is headed on a collision course with the Gate of Zedan. Later the Axis asteroid does indeed collide with the Gate of Zedan, but not before Jamitov and Bask evacuate with most of their forces intact. In his last appearance, Jamitov attends a conference with Haman and Scirocco, which ends with the latter killing him in order to gain control of the Titans. In the anime television series, Jamitov Hymem is voiced by Masaru Ikeda and Tomomichi Nishimura in Japanese and Steve Olson in English. In the anime film, he is voiced by Tomomichi Nishimura.
Rosamia Badam (ロザミア・バダム, Rozamia Badamu)
Lieutenant Rosamia Badam is a member of the Titans and the first cyber-Newtype to appear in the series. She first appears when she was summoned to help Buran Blutarch attack the AEUG/Karaba transport Audhumla with her Gaplant as her opponents are flying over the United States.
Although she winds up being defeated by the combined efforts of Kamille Bidan, Quattro Bajeena, and Katz Kobayashi, Rosamia escapes with her life. Rosamia reappears many episodes later on Side 3's Colony 13, claiming to be Kamille's sister. Although Kamille knows she is not really his sister, he pities Rosamia and takes her back to the Argama, where she is examined by the ship's physician Dr. Hasan. Her tests show that she is a cyber-Newtype, prompting an immediate search by Dr. Hasan and Lt. Quattro. However, with a little help from Shinta and Qum, Rosamia commandeers a Nemo and escapes the Argama. Although she initially helped Kamille in battle (still thinking he is her brother) against her fellow Titans, she eventually turned against him and went back to the Titans. She later fights Kamille again while piloting a Baund Doc, but he convinces her to land on Colony 13 and get out of the cockpit after she relapses into thinking he is her brother. The two of them have a heart-to-heart talk where Kamille tells her about Four Murasame and how she died. But then, Gates Capa and Loren Nakamoto quickly use mind control waves to make Rosamia hostile again. In the process, she nearly kills Kamille but Lt. Quattro intervenes, forcing her and the other Titans to retreat.
Rosamia appears one last time near the end of the Gryps Conflict piloting the Psyco Gundam Mk-II. By this time, she is under the impression that Gates is her brother and he sends her off on a mission to destroy the Zeta Gundam. Kamille senses her presence and sorties, wondering if the voice he heard belongs to Four Murasame. As soon as she spots Kamille in the Zeta Gundam, Rosamia engages him. Their fight ends with Kamille killing Rosamia but not before she reverts to a child-like state and says, "Brother, I found you!" Rosamia Badam is voiced by Kayoko Fujii in Japanese and Jennifer Bain in English. In the anime film, she is voiced by Yū Asakawa.
Gates Capa (ゲーツ・キャパ, Gētsu Kyapa)
Gates is one of the cyber-Newtypes produced at Augusta Newtype Lab. Compared to the other cyber-Newtypes, such as Four Murasame and Rosamia Badam, he is less powerful, but he has stable emotions. He functions as a mentor to Rosamia, and often supervises her when she enters combat. In order to keep her from disobeying orders, Gates had to pose as her brother. The two of them are both deeply linked, and they continue to fight together. However, during a battle on the asteroid "Axis", he is unable to prevent Rosamia from being killed by Kamille. Gates is able to sense this event, and it has a terrible effect upon him. This event causes his mind to collapse, and he is no longer able to move. He no longer appears again, and his overall fate is unknown. However in the novelization, Rosamia's attempt to protect Kamille in his broken state led to both of their deaths. Gates Capa is voiced by Kazuki Yao.
Kacricon Cacooler (カクリコン・カクーラー, Kakurikon Kakūrā)
Lieutenant Junior Grade Kacricon Cacooler, along with Jerid Messa and Emma Sheen, is a member of the Titans' initial trio of Gundam Mark-II test pilots. Forced to surrender his Gundam Mk-II during the AEUG's raid on the Titan headquarters, Kacricon rejoins the battle against the rebels once they reach the moon, serving as a senior partner to the relatively hapless Jerid. Kacricon is killed when he impulsively tries to take down the Gundam Mark-II while reentering the Earth's atmosphere and his ballute is ripped to shreds as his nemesis passes through close to him. Having lost another close friend to Kamille, Jerid swears to avenge Kacricon by killing Kamille. Kacricon Cacooler is voiced by Koji Totani in Japanese and Ben Jeffrey in English.
Lila Milla Rira (ライラ・ミラ・ライラ, Raira Mira Raira)
Lieutenant Lila Milla Rira is an ace pilot of the regular Earth Federation Forces, assigned to back up the Titans during their pursuit of the AEUG ship Argama. She initially mocks Jerid Messa for his failure to defeat Kamille in battle, but later agrees to help him become a better pilot after hearing him say he will swallow his pride and listen to her advice. The two of them become friends, paving the way for a possible romantic relationship when they meet again. However, Lila winds up being killed by Kamille after losing her cool in battle with him, making her the first of what would eventually be many pilots to die at his hands. She realizes her error during her final moments and beseeches Jerid not to make the same mistake. Lila Milla Rira is voiced by Kimie Sawaki in Japanese and Mariette Sluyter in English. In the anime film, she is voiced by Mayumi Asano.
Buran Blutarch (ブラン・ブルターク, Buran Burutāku)
Buran Blutarch is an ace pilot of the Titans who pursues the AEUG/Karaba transport Audhumla. He pilots a NRX-044 Asshimar, a transformable mobile suit armed with only a beam rifle. However, Buran puts this mobile suit to good use when he first appears during an assault on the Kennedy Space Center as he manages to destroy one of the two space shuttles that was supposed to carry AEUG mobile suit pilots back out into space and kill RMS-099 Rick Dias pilot Lieutenant Roberto. He continues to pursue the Audhumla across North America and nearly succeeds in destroying it himself but is thwarted by Amuro Ray. Despite help from the Cyber-Newtype Rosamia Badam, Buran consistently fails to sink the Audhumla is killed by Amuro piloting a Rick Dias that formerly belonged to Roberto's wingmate Apolly Bay. Buran Blutarch is voiced by Hidetoshi Nakamura in Japanese and Clark Robertson in English.

=== Axis ===
Haman Karn (ハマーン・カーン, Hamān Kān)
Haman Karn is the daughter of Admiral Maharaja Khan and the leader of Axis, the remnants of the Principality of Zeon, serving as regent to Mineva Lao Zabi, the last surviving member of the Zabi family. She also has a rather personal history with Char Aznable, who is now living under the alias Quattro Bajeena. She pilots her own personal mobile suit the Qubeley, which is equipped with a miniaturised psycommu system and 12 remote weapons known as "funnels" (a simplified version of psycommu controlled weapon system "bits" equipped in the Mobile Armor Lalah Sune piloted back in Gundam). Her aptitude with the psycommu was extremely high. While she claims to be fighting in order to restore the Zabi family to power, her actions hint an ulterior motive. Nevertheless, both the AEUG and the Titans seek her help in defeating the other. When Char Aznable tries to attack Haman during their meeting aboard Axis' capital ship, negotiations broke down between the two factions, and Axis instead allied itself with the Titans. At a convenient time Axis eventually exited the alliance with the Titans. The war culminated in a battle between Haman, Char and Scirocco, ultimately ending with Kamille in his Zeta Gundam showing up to fight Scirocco's PMX-003 The-O, while Haman in her Qubeley, defeats Char's Hyaku Shiki. In a final conversation between the two, she revealed her affection to Char and asked for his return. Char declined her offer and triggered an explosion within the crippled Salamis cruiser which led to his MIA. Haman Karn is voiced by Yoshiko Sakakibara in Japanese and Valerie Howell in English.
Mineva Lao Zabi (ミネバ・ラオ・ザビ, Mineba Rao Zabi)
Voiced by: Miki Itou (MSGZ, MSGZZ), Ayu Hiramoto (MSZG Movies), Ayumi Fujimura (Unicorn) (Japanese); Katie Rowan (Gundam Z), Stephanie Sheh (Unicorn) (English)
The daughter of Dozle and Zeena Zabi, Mineva Lao Zabi was born during the One Year War which claimed her father's family and ended up in the care of the Karn family after her mother died with Haman intending to use the girl to restore the Principality of Zeon. Though raised in preparation for her role as a figurehead in Karn's scheme, Mineva was actually a lonely little girl who longed for companionship. Following the conclusion of the First Neo Zeon War, Mineva had been sent into hiding. Mineva resurfaces during the events of Gundam Unicorn under the alias of Audrey Burne (オードリー・バーン, Ōdorī Bān), having developed Newtype abilities while seeking to end the Third Neo Zeon War.

== Others ==
Mirai Noa (ミライ・ノア)
Former navigator of the White Base during the One Year War and wife of Captain Bright Noa. She and her children, Hathaway and Cheimin, are taken hostages by the Titans in a bid to make Karaba surrender their transport ship Audhumla while it is docked in Hong Kong City. Mirai Yashima is voiced by Fuyumi Shiraishi in Japanese and Mariette Sluyter in English.
Shinta (シンタ) and Qum (クム, Kumu)
A pair of orphaned children whom Quattro brought back with him to the Argama upon his return from Dakar. They basically play the same role that Katz Kobayashi and his adoptive siblings played on board the White Base during the One Year War. They get into all sorts of mischief, irking the Argama crew. They are entrusted to the care of Fa Yuiry and Haro. They also develop a bond with Rosamia Badam when she boards the Argama under the impression that Kamille is her brother. Shinta is voiced by Chika Sakamoto in Japanese and Brett Bauer in English. Qum is voiced by Mayumi Shou in Japanese and Caitlynne Medrek in English.
Franklin Bidan (フランクリン・ビダン, Furankurin Bidan) and Hilda Bidan (ヒルダ・ビダン, Hiruda Bidan)
A husband-and-wife team of scientists employed by the Titans for the development of the Gundam Mk-II. They are also the parents of Kamille Bidan. Both Hilda and Kamille are well aware that Franklin has a mistress, but Hilda chooses to ignore this because she loves her work too much, which bothers Kamille. Both parents are taken hostage by the Titans in order to coerce the AEUG into returning the Mk-II prototypes that Kamille helped steal. Hilda is killed by Jerid Messa when he fires on the capsule she is in, thinking that it was actually a bomb that would destroy the Mk-II that Kamille was using in order to retrieve her. Disgusted by the Titans' tactics, Titan pilot Emma Sheen helps Franklin and Kamille escape along with all three Mk-II prototypes and take them back to the AEUG. However, Franklin later steals a RMS-099 Rick Dias and winds up getting killed during his attempt to take it back to the Titans. Although Kamille resented his parents for putting up their charade of being a happy family, he is deeply saddened after losing them and cries his heart out. Franklin Bidan is voiced by Ikuya Sawaki in Japanese and Steve Olson in English. Hilda Bidan is voiced by Gara Takashima in Japanese and Michelle Armeneau in English.
Sayla Mass (セイラ・マス, Seira Masu)
A former crew member of the White Base during the One Year War and the younger sister of Char Aznable. Because voice actress Yō Inoue was on a safari in Africa during the production of the series, Sayla only appeared briefly in non-speaking cameos. In episode 37, she was seen outside a beachside villa, listening to Char's speech at the Federation Assembly in Dakar on the news.
In the 2005–2006 movie trilogy, Sayla's cameo appearances were deleted, as the Karaba invasion and Char's speech in Dakar did not occur. Instead, she is seen at the end of the third film conversing with Kai Shiden about her brother. This scene used an archived recording of Inoue's voice, as she died of lung cancer in 2003.
