= Gundam Factory Yokohama =

Entertainment complex in Yokohama, Japan

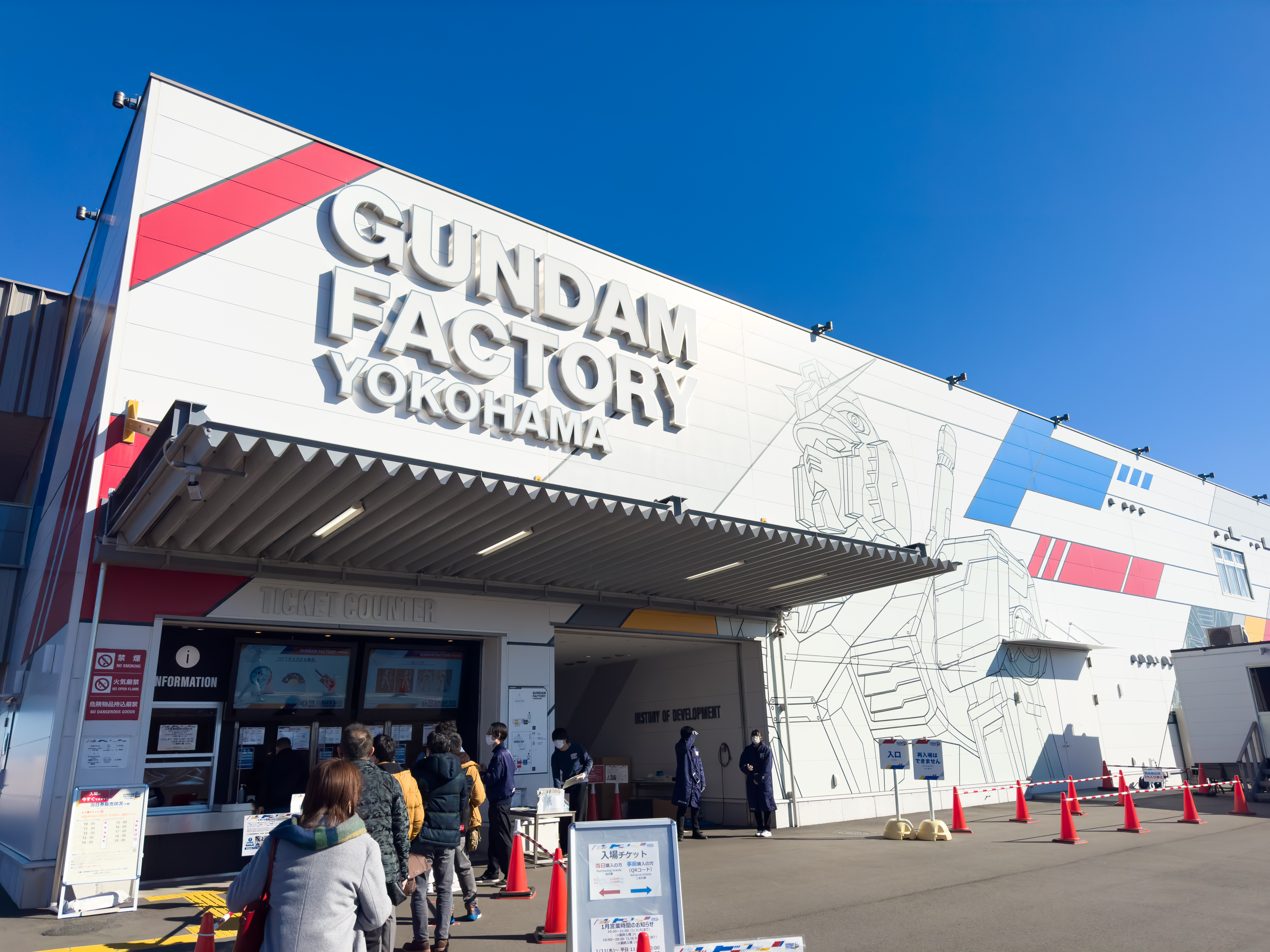
- Gundam Factory Yokohama ticket office in 2023

Yokohama, Japan
- Opening date: 19 December 2020
- Closing date: 31 March 2024

Gundam Factory Yokohama was an entertainment complex located at Yamashita Pier in Yokohama, Japan. Its main feature was a moving Gundam, an 18-metre tall "mech" (a large mechanical automaton which in its fictional universe has a human operator inside) from the Japanese animated franchise Gundam. It was the first moving mech of its type, although it more closely resembled a puppet since it was supported and moved by an armature connected to its back.

Originally planned to open by October 2020 to both celebrate the 40th Anniversary of the Gundam franchise and for the 2020 Tokyo Olympics, the construction of the exhibit was delayed due to the COVID-19 pandemic. On December 18, 2020, rock band Luna Sea performed Gundam's 40th anniversary theme song "The Beyond" on live TV at the opening ceremony. The site opened on December 19, 2020, and was scheduled to remain open until March 31, 2022. However, the closing date was delayed to March 31, 2023, again due to the pandemic, and then delayed again to March 31, 2024, because of its lasting success.

Events for the closing ceremonies on March 31, 2024, included a speech by series director Yoshiyuki Tomino, a "performance of the last activation experiment in a scenario that continues the story from the opening event", and a drone art show consisting of about 1000 drones and fireworks.

There were two features to the exhibit: Gundam Dock and Gundam Lab.

The life-sized, moving RX-78F00 Gundam

== Gundam Dock ==
The primary exhibition of the complex was the moving Gundam mech. Named the RX-78F00 Gundam, it was the third Gundam statue in Japan constructed to a 1:1 scale with its anime counterpart, following the 2009 RX-78-2 and 2017 RX-0 Unicorn Gundam, both constructed at Tokyo Gundam Base. Following the closure of Gundam Factory Yokohama, the RX-78F00 was removed and rebuilt as a stationary statue in Osaka for the Gundam Next Future Pavilion at Expo 2025.

== Gundam Lab ==
The Gundam lab exhibition featured information about the construction of the RX-78F00, a virtual reality dome that simulates the interior of the Gundam's cockpit, a cafe with Gundam themed products and a GUNPLA merchandise store.

== Cultural significance ==
The site celebrated the 40th anniversary of the premiere of the first Gundam series. Yoshiyuki Tomino, the creator of Gundam, personally worked on the project. Gundam has become the 16th highest grossing media franchise, and has been highly regarded for its influence in other media.
