= Statue of Unicorn Gundam =

Sculpture in Tokyo, Japan

Gundam statue at Odaiba, Tokyo
- The statue in "Destroy Mode" in 2019
- Subject: Gundam
- Dimensions: 19.7 m (65 ft)
- Location: Tokyo, Japan; 35.62446°N 139.77548°E

The Life-Sized Unicorn Gundam Statue (Japanese: 実物大ユニコーンガンダム, Hepburn: Jitsubutsu Dai Yunikōn Gandamu) was a full-scale statue of the RX-0 Unicorn Gundam from the series Mobile Suit Gundam Unicorn installed in 2017 outside Odaiba's Gundam-themed mall DiverCity Tokyo Plaza, in Tokyo, Japan. It replaced a previous statue of the RX-78-2 Gundam.

== Description ==
The statue transitioned between its default "Unicorn Mode" and an illuminated "Destroy Mode", reflecting the original anime robot's transformation to activate enhanced combat features. According to Lonely Planet, "Destroy Mode" is activated nine times per day.

The "life-sized" (1:1 scale), 19.7-meter (64.6-foot) statue was installed in 2017 and has evening "performances", during which its head moves, eyes light up, music is played, and mist is sprayed. The statue weighs 49 tons.

According to Masaki Kawahara, who oversaw the production of the statue, it is composed of 230 parts. Parts of the exterior are made of glass fiber reinforced plastic. The lower part of the statue was manufactured in Bangkok, Thailand, while the upper part is molded in Tokyo.

== History ==
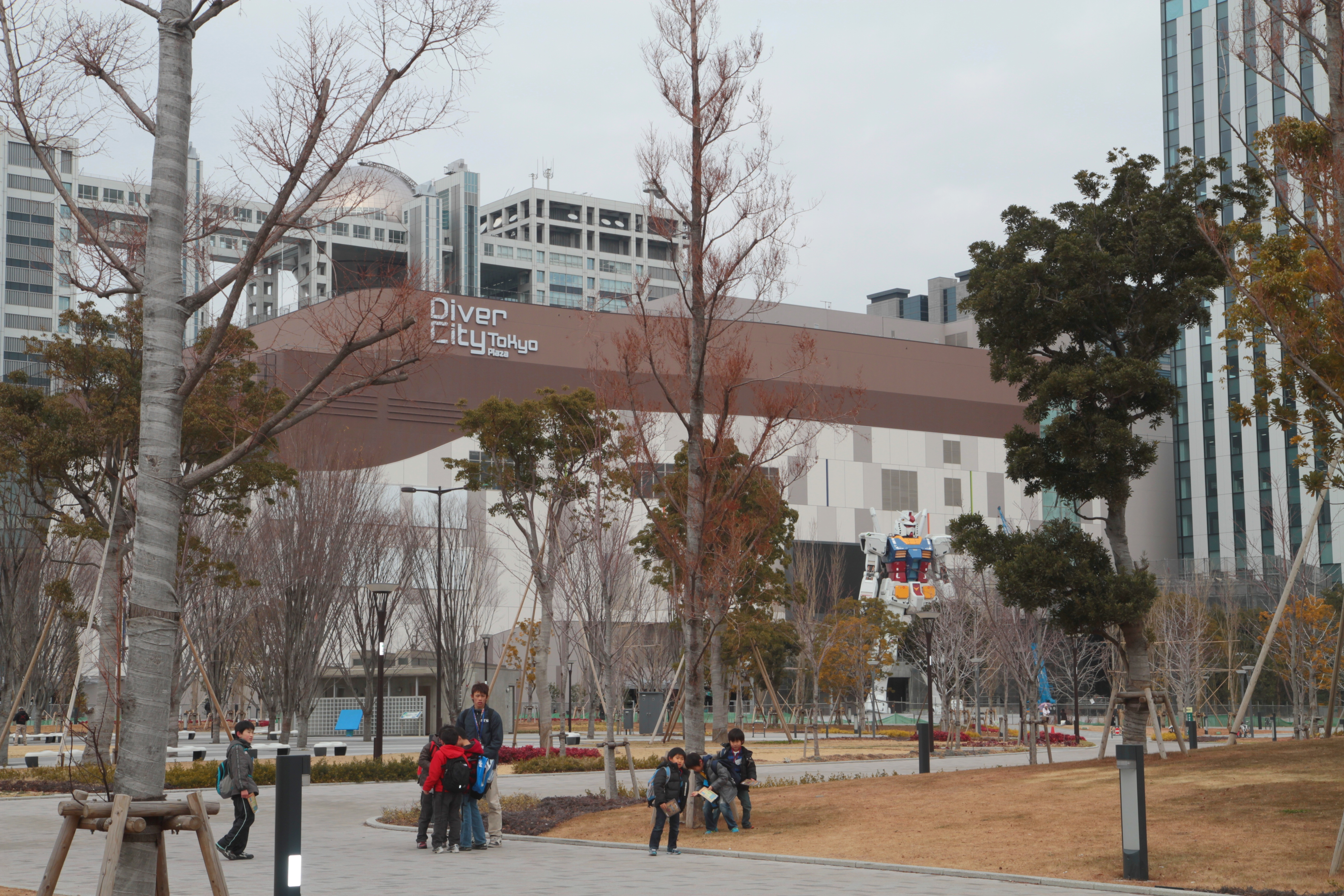
The old RX-78-2 Gundam statue outside DiverCity Tokyo Plaza, 2012

An unveiling ceremony was held on September 25, 2017. A temporary service offered professional photography featuring the statue. The statue replaced a previous statue of the RX-78-2 Gundam that was removed in March of that year.

In late 2024 and early 2025, the statue was illuminated in blue, red, and yellow to commemorate the 45th anniversary of the Mobile Suit Gundam animated series.

During August 29 2026, at 7:30 pm, the statue received its final retirement ceremony, with producers of the original anime soundtrack performing a live concert, including Japanese composer Hiroyuki Sawano, alongside guest singer SennaRin whom also took part in the concert

After the final performance on August 31 2026, on the following day September 1 demolition has not been done, nevertheless construction crew arrived later on to seal off the area for removal.

By October 20 2026 the statue has been fully removed.

== Reception ==
The statue is considered an attraction for DiverCity Tokyo Plaza and is among the city's most popular public sculptures. In the 2020 book Creativity in Tokyo: Revitalizing a Mature City, the statue is described as an example of "mixing popular culture and consumption". The author of Super Cheap Japan (2023) called the statue "immensely awesome!" CNN has said visiting the statue "grants an instant reward" to any fan of the Gundam series.

== See also ==
- Cultural impact of Gundam
- Gundam Factory Yokohama: 2020–2024 tourist attraction featuring a moving life-sized Gundam statue
