= DiverCity Tokyo Plaza =

- ダイバーシティ東京 プラザ
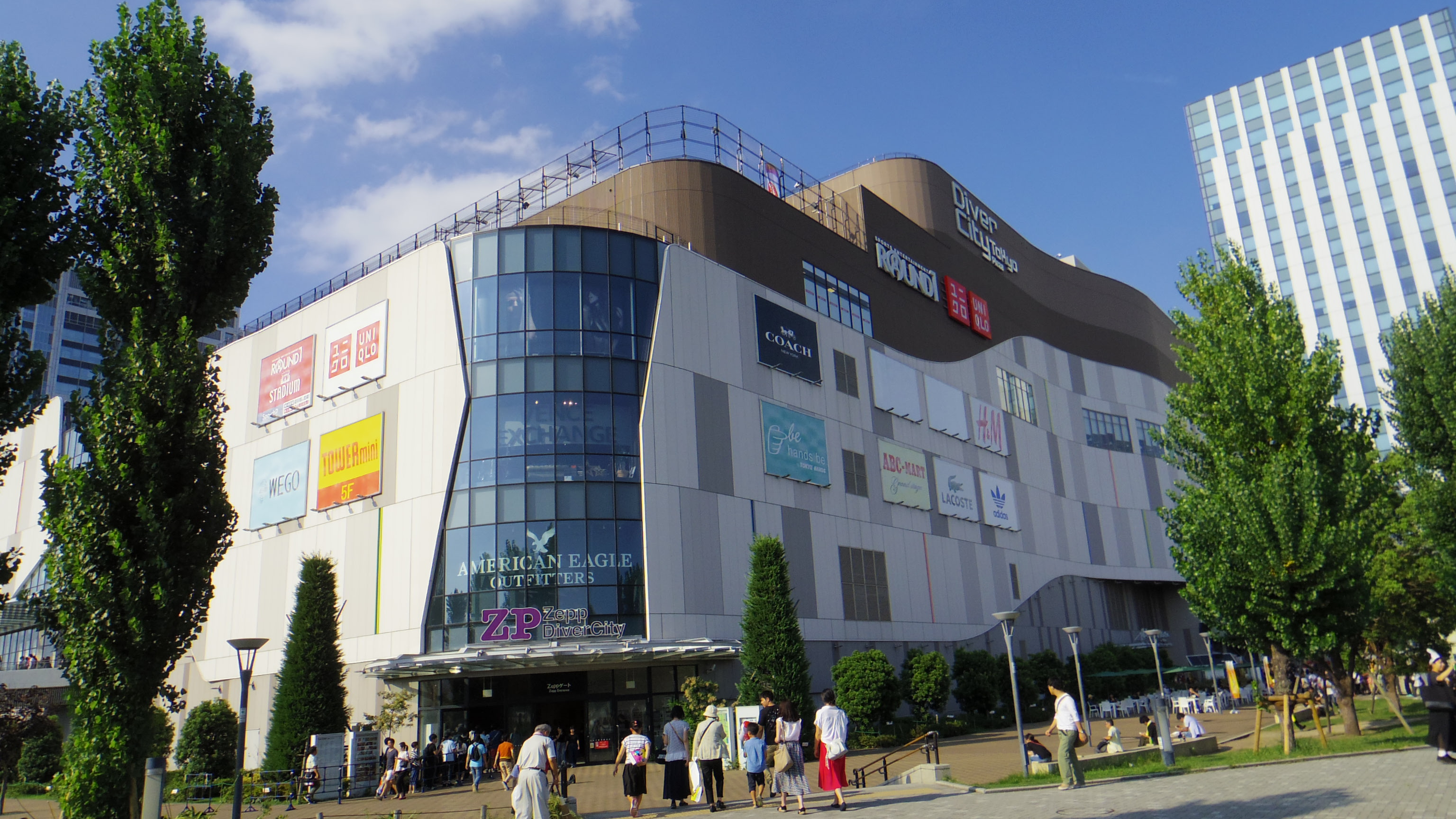
- The mall's exterior in 2017
- Location: Odaiba, Tokyo, Japan
- Coordinates: 35.625167°N 139.775361°E
- Address: 1 Chome-1-10 Aomi, Koto City, Tokyo 135-0064, Japan
- Opened: 19 April 2012
- Owner: Mitsui Fudosan
- Num. of stores: 154
- Parking: 1,400
- Website: mitsui-shopping-park.com/divercity-tokyo/

DiverCity Tokyo Plaza (ダイバーシティ東京 プラザ) is a shopping mall in Odaiba, Tokyo, Japan. It is a commercial facility located in DiverCity Tokyo, operated by Mitsui Fudosan Commercial Management.

== Entertainment ==
- Gundam Base Tokyo (7F)
  - A full-scale Unicorn Gundam (RG 1/1 RX-0 Unicorn Gundam Ver.TWC) is on display at the 2nd floor Festival Square, and the statue is transformed (from Unicorn mode to Destroy mode) at certain times of the day. Later in the day it can be seen lighting up. In the past, a full-scale Gundam (RG 1/1 RX-78-2 Gundam Ver.GFT) was on display.
- Round One (6th, 7th floor, stadium store)
- hexaRide (5F)
  - VR ride-type attraction controlled by a 6-axis platform. Experiences have included; Ghost in the Shell and Attack on Titan.
- Tyffonium (5F)
  - Next-generation MR attraction. Experiences include; Fractus, It Carnival and Tarot VR: Voyage of Reverie.
- Little Planet (5F)
  - An indoor children's park known for its augmented reality experiences.
- Zepp DiverCity (Tokyo) (2F)
  - A music hall.
- Unko Museum Tokyo (2F)
  - Known in English as the Poop Museum it opened in August 2019.

== Gallery ==
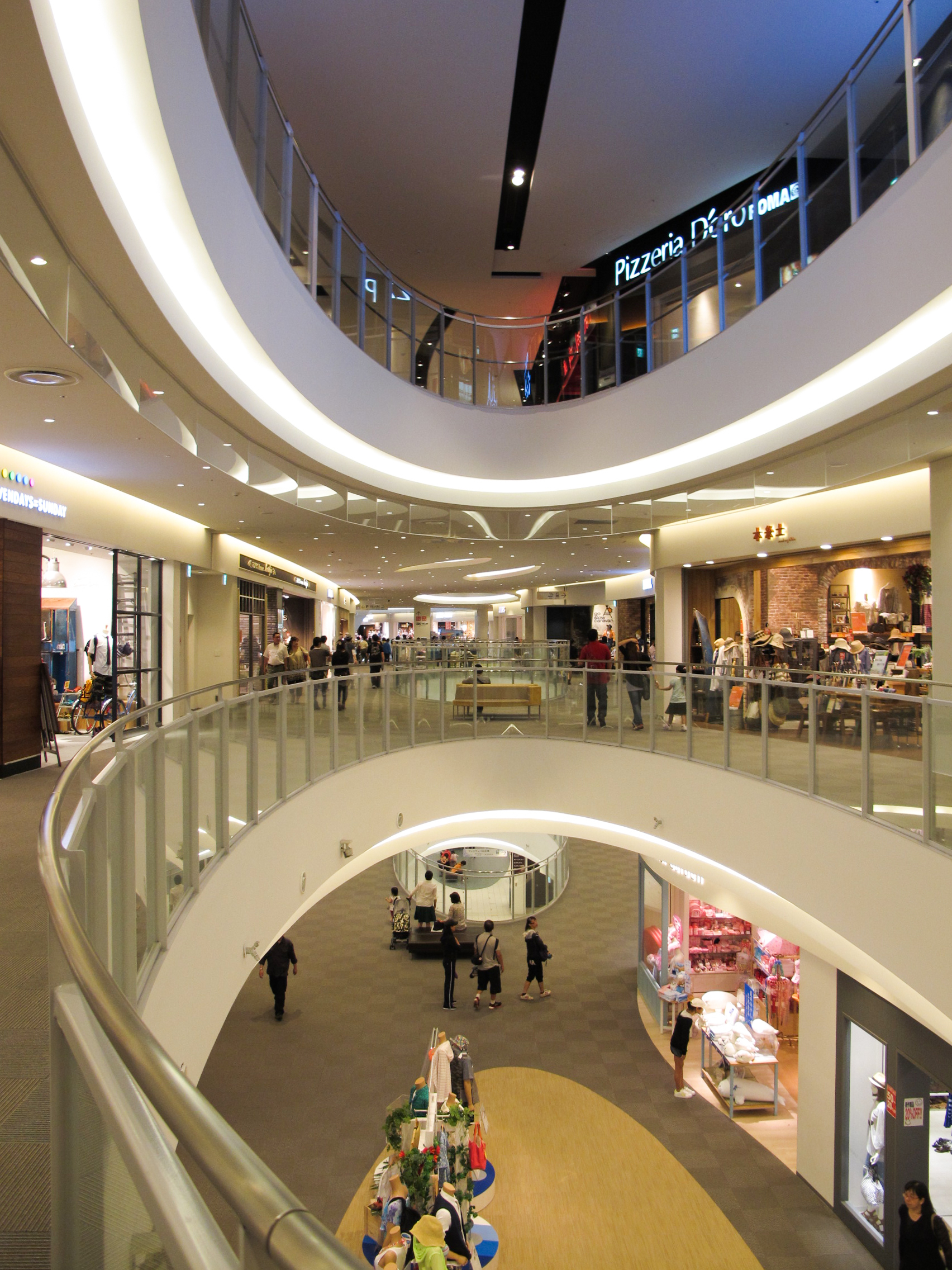
Diver City Tokyo Interior

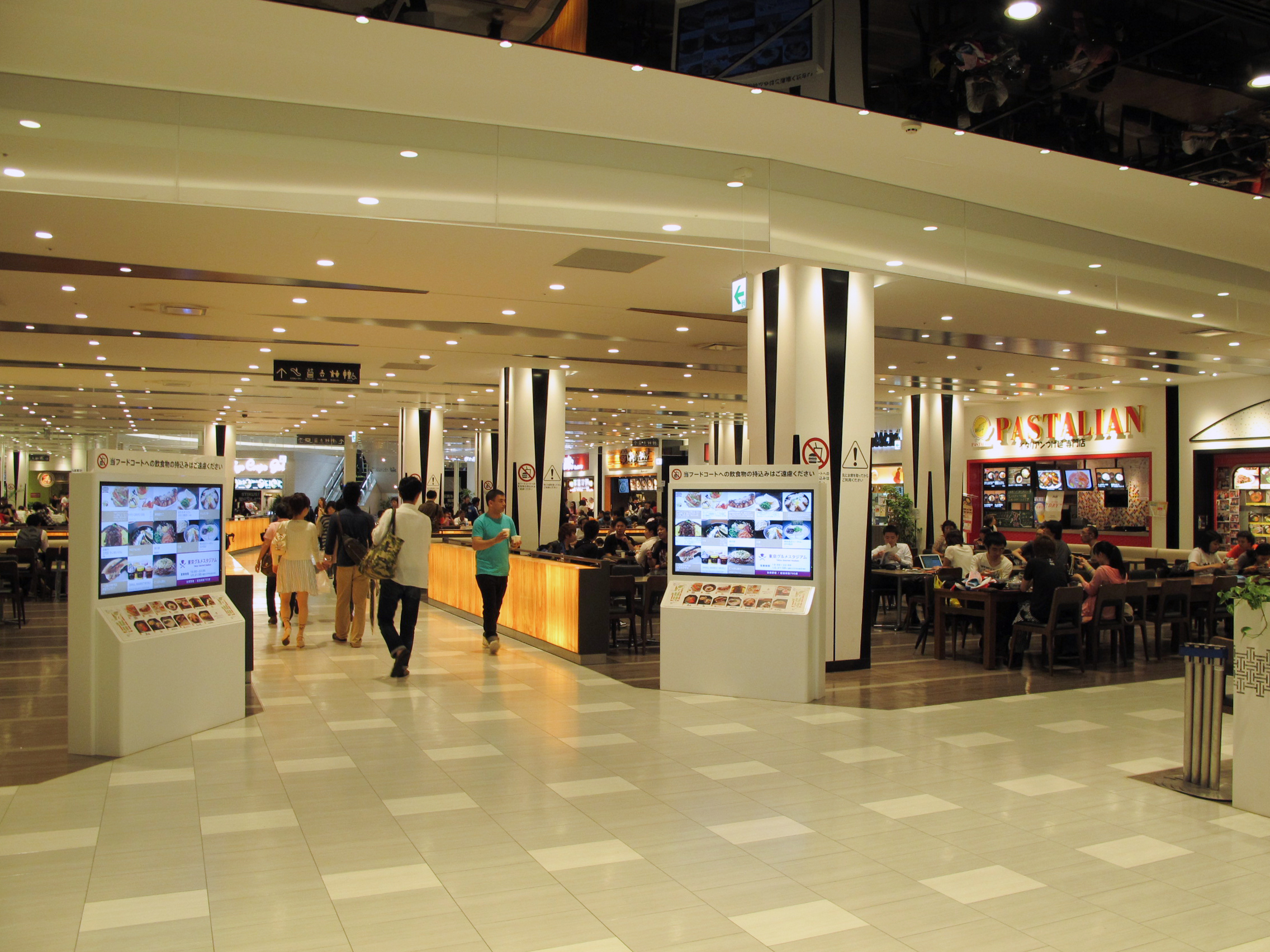
Food Court on Level 2

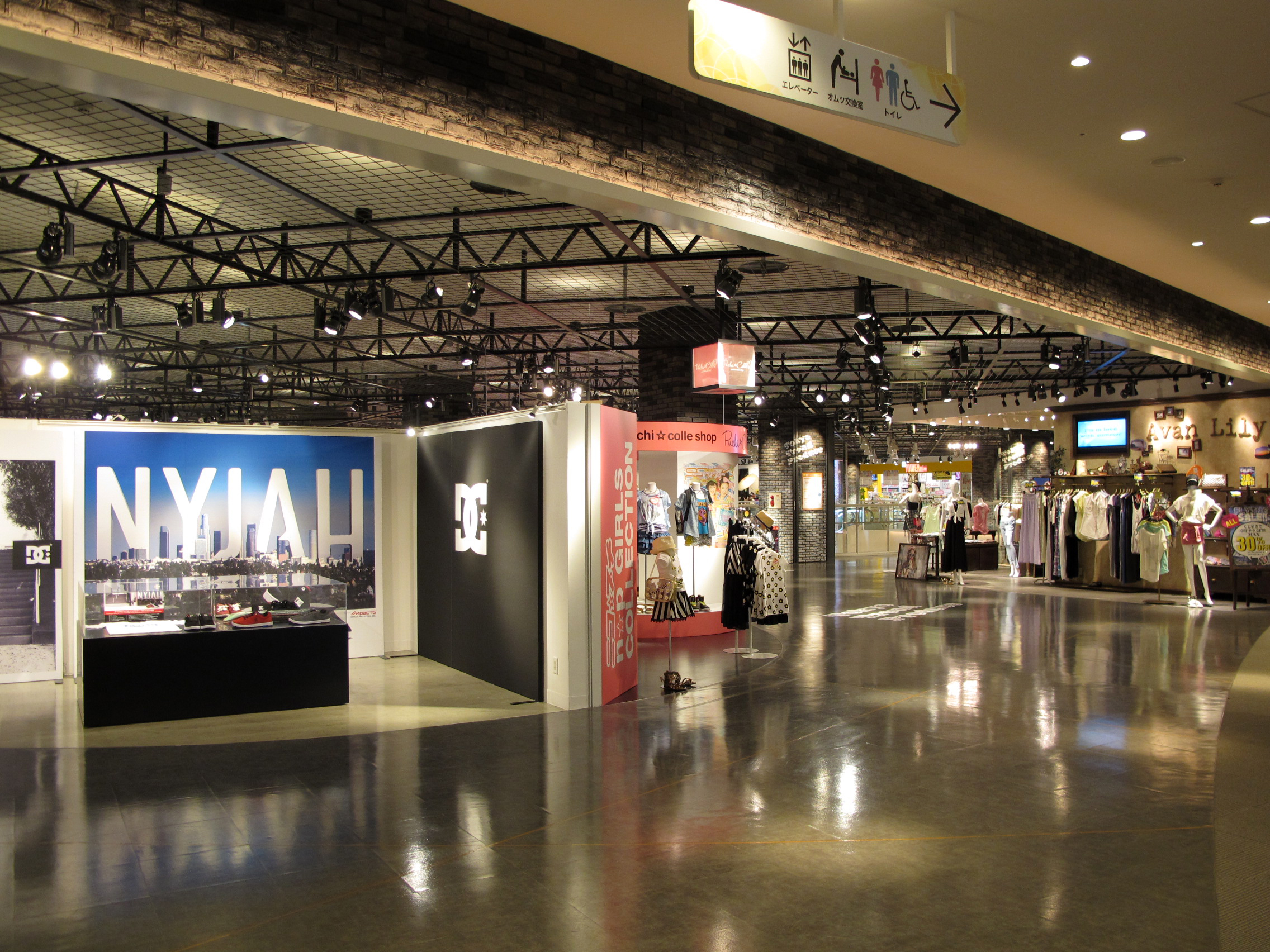
HLNA Zone on Level 5

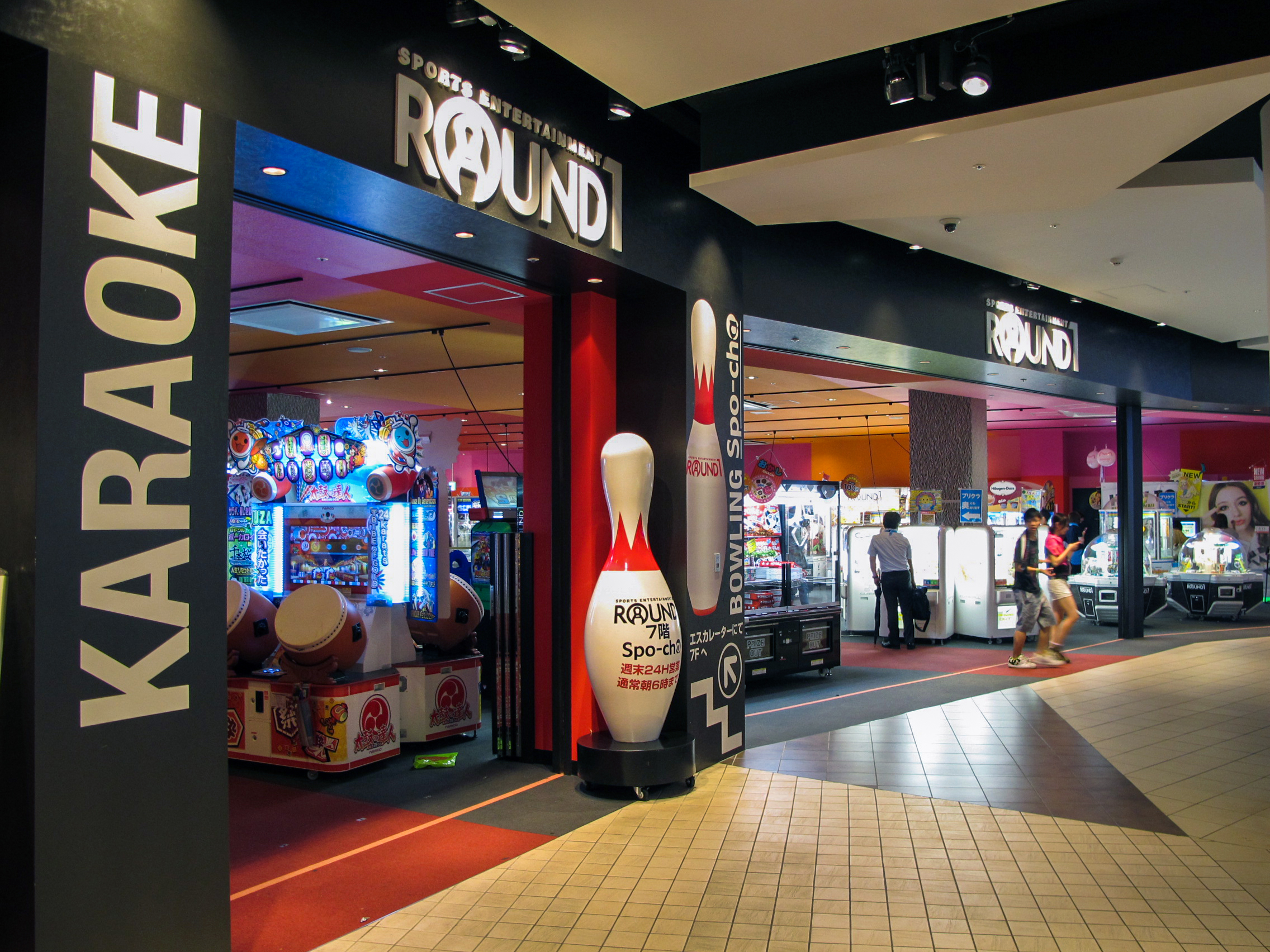
Round 1 on Level 6

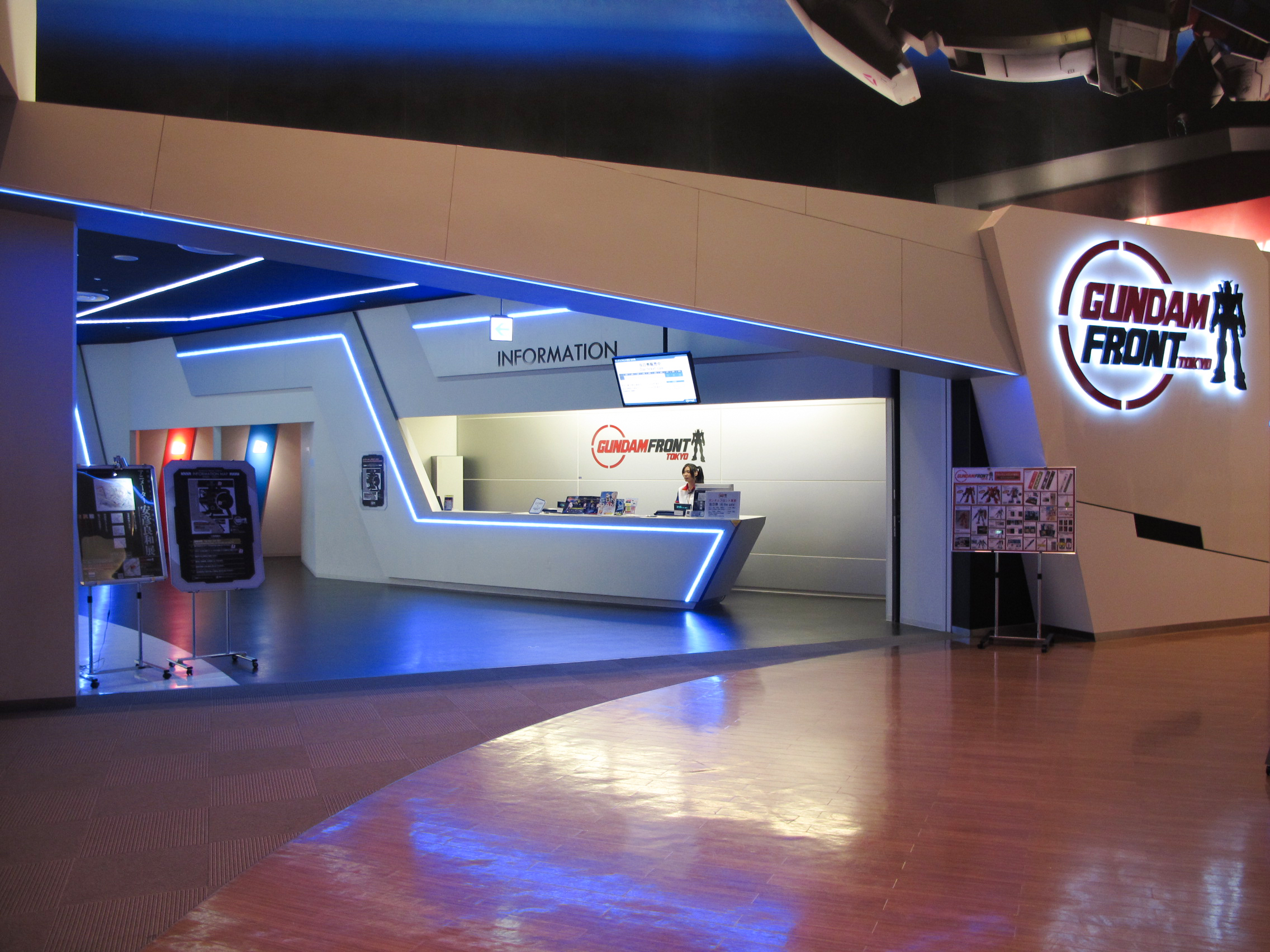
Gundam Front on Level 7

== See also ==
- List of shopping malls in Japan
