= Yakatabune =

Japanese traditional party boat

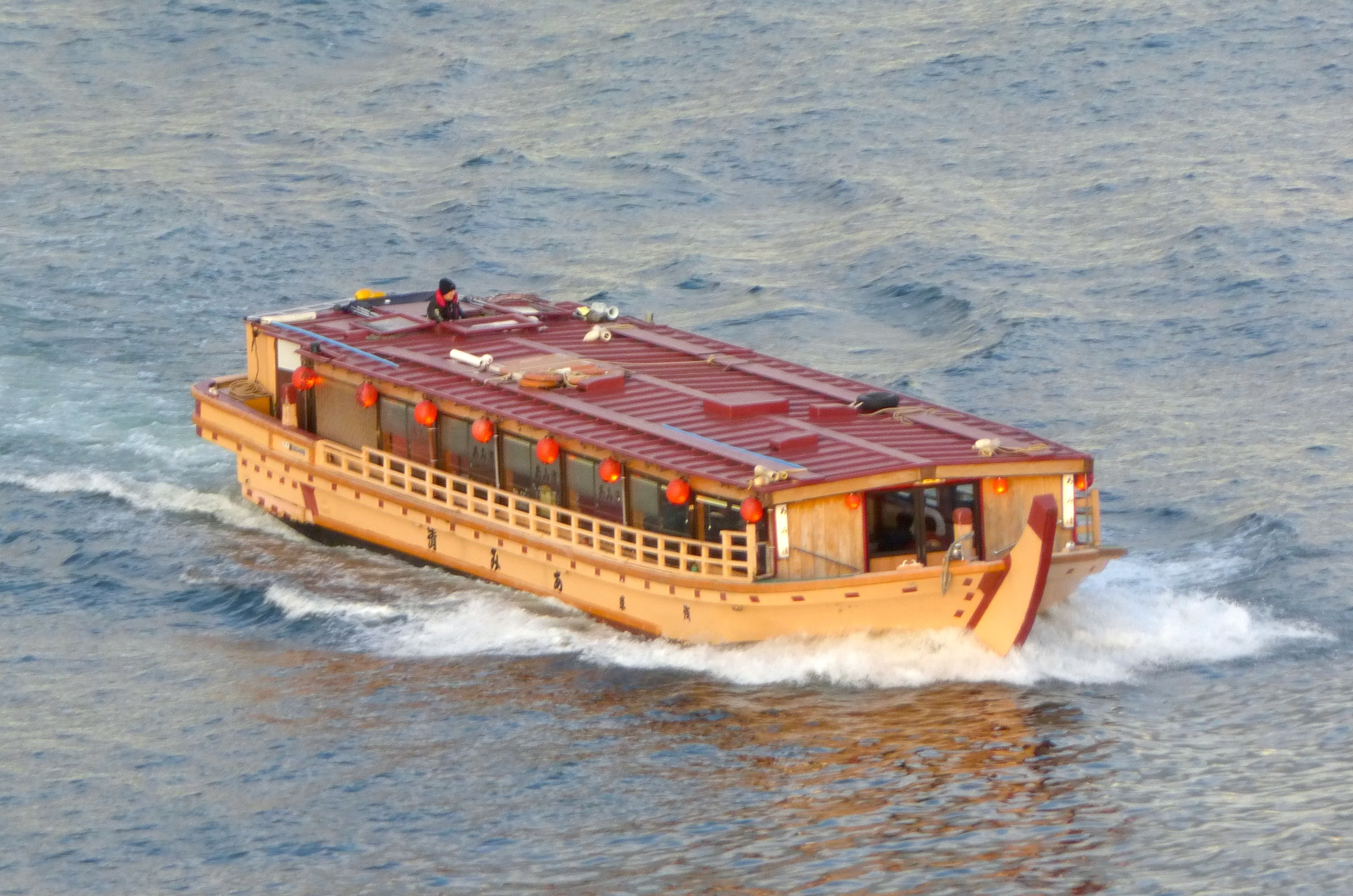
A yakatabune near Odaiba

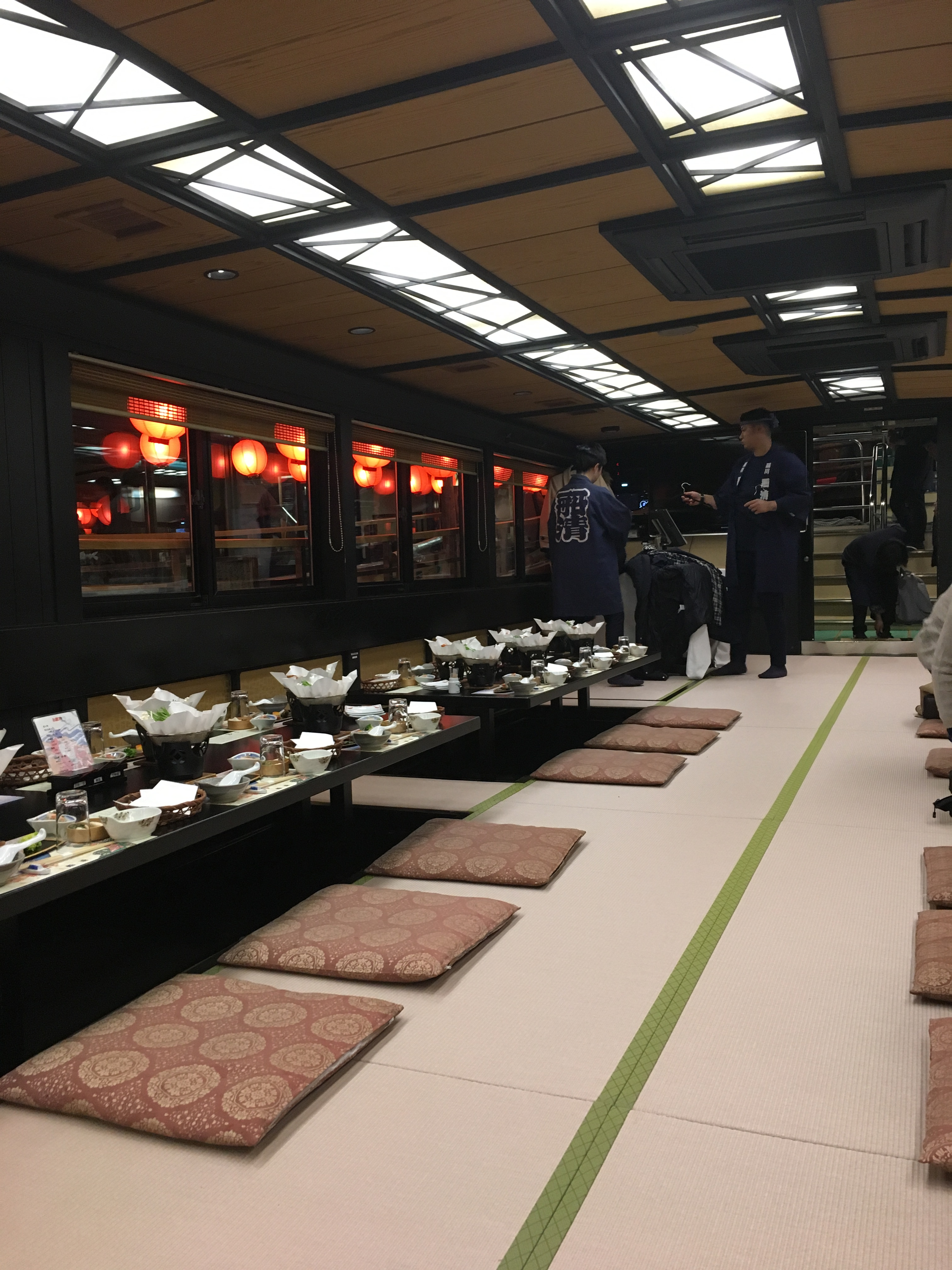
The inside of a yakatabune

A yakatabune (屋形船) is a kind of privately owned Japanese boat that has been in use since the Heian period. Private boats of the shōgun from the Heian through the Edo periods were very lavishly decorated. Inside, a yakatabune has tatami mats and Japanese low tables that resemble an upper-class Japanese home; in fact, it means "home-style boat", and were basically for entertaining guests in the old days.

Today, they ply the waterways of the rivers and bays of Tokyo among the skyscrapers and temples for sightseeing and retain a traditional feel. They are often easily identifiable at night by their red lanterns hung along the outside of the cabin.
