= MS Saga: A New Dawn =

2005 video game

- Developer: BEC
- Publishers: JP: Bandai; NA: Namco Bandai Games (Note: Released under the Bandai label)
- Composers: Tadayoshi Makino; Satoshi Ishikawa; Yasushi Umura
- Platform: PlayStation 2
- Release: JP: June 30, 2005; NA: February 21, 2006
- Genres: Role-playing; Mecha; Military Science Fiction; Adventure
- Mode: Single player

MS Saga: A New Dawn (Note: Japanese: Gundam True Odyssey(ガンダム トゥルーオデッセイ) 〜失われしGの伝説〜, Hepburn: Gandamu Turū Odessei 〜Ushinawareshi G no Densetsu〜; lit. "Gundam True Odyssey: The Legend of the Lost G") is a role-playing game for the PlayStation 2 console based on the Gundam franchise. The game was designed to be accessible to a general audience unfamiliar with Gundam. The "MS" in the title refers to the iconic Mobile Suit that features in the series.

== Gameplay ==
The major focus of the game is the ability to customize their own mobile suits using parts of mecha designs from the early Universal Century Gundam anime series, Mobile Fighter G Gundam, and Mobile Suit Gundam Wing. The units on offer are kept to more basic mecha while more powerful ones (such as the powerful Devil Gundam Corps from G Gundam) are kept as game-controlled bosses. To complete the game, players will need to find which parts and pilots combinations work best. Battles are carried out similarly to older Final Fantasy titles, with enemies and player characters in turn-based combat. Actions use AP, which can be stored up to allow for the use of more powerful weapons or special attack. Outside of battle, Mobile Suits can be modified by swapping parts, which also usually changes the appearance, altering coloration, which is purely cosmetic, and changing weapons and shield items. Weapons can be hand-held (rifles, sabers) or mounted (Gatling guns, shoulder cannons). Certain special attacks require minimum numbers of weapons, or specific types. As an example, one could mount Master Gundam's wings on the Zeta Gundam, with shoulder armor from the Gundam Sandrock and the legs of a Dom.

== Story ==
At the peak of society, humanity created a complex machine system the Glory System (Known by all as the G System), an amazing technology which could create any machine so long as there were plans for it. However, tragedy struck soon after an apocalypse gripped Earth. Humanity began to rebuild society as best they could and called the apocalypse the "Great Fall". A young boy named Tristan (Trush in the original Japanese version) lives happily at an orphanage with his best friend, Fritz. But the happiness is ended when mysterious new weapons known as mobile suits lay siege on the orphanage and kill its occupants. Seeking revenge and answers, Tristan sets out to find out why his home was attacked. Along the way, he will assemble a party of loyal allies and discover a dark conspiracy. They begin the story by obtaining a RGM-79 GM from the G System and end up battling a Zaku I from the get-go. Tristan and Fritz begin on the quest, after obtaining the RGM-79 GM and Zaku I, to avenge the loss of their orphanage and caretaker. Apparently, the killer, whose name is Vladi Zarth, leads a group called the Dark Alliance, trying to take over the world. They set forth on this quest and meet up with others with the same goal in mind, to kill Vladi Zarth and take down the Dark Alliance.

== Characters ==
=== Party Groups ===
Tristan (トリスタン, Torisutan) - (Trush in Japan)
voiced by Yuri Lowenthal
One year ago, Tristan had left an orphanage run by a kind woman named Ms. Natalie. As he was leaving, the orphanage was completely destroyed by a black Zaku IIS and two Zaku II escorts. He swore revenge, and with his childhood friend Fritz, created a GM to try and track down and destroy the Black Zaku to avenge his friends and benefactor. He always looks to the future and has a bright outlook, but this sometimes causes him to take action without thinking, which can get him into all kinds of trouble. His strong sense of justice means that he won't just leave people behind when they're in trouble. Throughout the story, Tristan is shown to have aspects akin to that of a newtype (even learning a skill similar to Mobile Suit Gundam's protagonist, Amuro). His pilot primary mobile suit was the Gundam, the Zeta Gundam, ZZ Gundam and in late stages he pilot Nu Gundam.

Fritz - (Flitz in Japan) Fritz is Tristan's childhood friend from the orphanage where the two grew up, whom he treats like a younger brother. He knows a lot about machinery and traveling, so he travels with Tristan as his trusted companion and support. He had a habit of disappearing for months at a time, and has a history with the street rats of Eisengrad. He is somewhat of a coward, but always follows through on his promises. Fritz is very money-minded, and often complains about high prices in the Black Market. His initial mobile suit was MS-05 Zaku I, later also with Full Armor Gundam.

Aeon - (Ithi in Japan) Aeon is a young girl, about the same age as Fritz and Tristan. She was found unconscious inside a spaceship that crashed some time after the Great Fall, which the locals of Angelina call Moon Ark. She suffers from an advanced form of amnesia, and cannot remember anything from before Tristan and Fritz found her. Aeon is unusual in that she does not seem to know about most things that other people assume is common knowledge - She did not even know what the Ocean was. Throughout the story she begins to display powers similar to a Newtype. She initially pilots a MS-06 Zaku II, also Wing Gundam Zero Custom in late stages.

Tremmie - (Tremie in Japan) Tremmie fights the Dark Alliance by herself, and has a massive ego. She is very exuberant and has a lot of energy, something that annoys Fritz to no end. She always has something to say, though as the story progresses it is revealed that her last name is Zarth. She's searching for the man using her deceased brother's name, Vladi Zarth. She initially pilots a GM Command.

Gavenger - Gavenger first appeared inside the G-System 02. The party meets him as he is building a Dom, and he takes off with it immediately after assuring them that he's not a threat. Gavenger later joins the party to pay them back for helping him out of a tight spot with the Dark Alliance. His rough outward appearance would not suggest it, but he is actually a brilliant scholar. He is twenty four, though looks older, which becomes the subject of some teasing from the younger characters. Gavenger is an undercover agent for the G's Unicorn, a sort of international police force that maintains the G-Systems, thus he knows much information about Marie, who established the Unicorns. He was killed by Lapis's Psycho Gundam when trying to protect Tristan's company to escape from Vladi Zarth Army's assault, and he passed his mobile suit to Bazuli before his death.

Vargas - (Vanges in Japan) Vargas is the captain of the Sky Pirates and owner of the Black Market. He loves to fly, and is a master mobile suit sniper. It quickly becomes obvious that Vargas is also something of a ladies man, as he constantly hits on the of-age female characters. After he joins the party, he's usually found in town trying to pick up random NPCs. Vargas often tries to cover up his lady-loving habits under more legitimate motives. ("What? I'm not trying to pick her up, I'm gathering intelligence!"). It's notable that Vargas is extremely skilled at avoiding a beating. He pilots a GM Sniper II, after passing the suit to Tristan, he got himself a Kampfer instead. In addition, he owns a Gaw for continent travelling.

Li Fang - (Hakuho in Japan) Li Fang is a Chinese master of the ancient and notable powerful martial art 'Hosho-Ken'. She works as a bodyguard for the arms dealer Mr. K, and is noticeably naive and quite gullible in regards to mobile suits. For instance, Mr. K convinced her that a Guncannon was, in fact, the Gundam. Despite this, however, Li Fang's martial skill is enough to make her extremely dangerous in the Guncannon - A mobile suit about as far from being optimized for close combat as any mobile suit can get. She's often the target of Vargas' affections, and usually responds with threats of bodily harm. Li Fang has carried out these threats on numerous occasions with mixed results. In the middle of conflict between the Unicorn and the Neo Zarth, she pilots the Shining Gundam, a suit that match her more, to join in Tristan's team.

Hal Vizardt - (Neyarl in Japan) Captain Hal is the commander of the Mobile Suit forces in Eisengrad, reporting directly to General Sosei and the superior to Major Rezner. While his past isn't known, Hal is a skilled mobile suit pilot and has a genuine interest in bringing about an end to the Dark Alliance. He usually sends the party on missions, though joins up on several separate occasions to give them a hand with difficult operations. His default mobile suit was Gelgoog Commander Type, and Sazabi in late stages.

Nance Rezner - (Lanser in Japan) The subordinate of Captain Vizardt, Rezner is the only character in the game consistently referred to by her last name, even in the menus and status screens. She's an upright soldier of Eisengrad, and specializes in low-speed melee combat. Rezner follows a code of honor, though she has her doubts about children on the battlefield. Her initial mobile suit was Gyan.

Marie Orijin Neikeshuneku Tokita - A woman the group meets on their travels. She acts very adult and treats Tristan like a child, but can be surprisingly childish herself. She was a scholar of Virtual History (which similar to the Black History in Turn A Gundam), and the one who establish the Unicorns. Through was half-retired, she has a great influence in the Unicorns, and has the right to use Unicorns' power in emergency. Her house has stocked quite a number of mobile suits, parts and blueprints, including a Zaku, Qubeley, and even ZZ Gundam.

=== Dark Alliance ===
Weaver - Oceanstorm Weaver pilots the Zock. He commands an armada of Marine-type mobile suits and runs pirate operations on the open seas with impunity, operating out of an abandoned military base on the Arabian peninsula.

Zain - Ironwall Zain pilots the Xamel. Operating out of an old mining complex in Africa, he has led several attacks against surrounding cities, including the trading hub El Dar Samnia. There is no foe his Xamel has not bested.

Kowloon - Also known as 'Mr. K', Kowloon is an arms dealer and a general in the Dark Alliance. He's infamous in Tohai as a mafia-like businessman who makes his enemies 'disappear'. He pilots the Apsalus, and Li Fang is his bodyguard. He's a very slick and nasty character, boasting that his Apsalus will burn all enemies of the Dark Alliance.

Bazuli - (Basulee in Japan) Bazuli is the fourth General of the Dark Alliance. He pilots Big Zam, and operates out of a fortress in the mountains of Siberia. After he realized Vladi Zarth's plan after the fall of the Dark Alliance's Base, he pilots Gavenger's mobile suit and joins Tristan.

Lapis - Lapis is the final desperation weapon of the Neo-Zarth Army after they have been driven from Eisengrad. She pilots the Psycho Gundam in both Fortress and Mobile Armor mode. Extremely aggressive and defensive of Neo-Zarth's ideals, it is revealed she was brainwashed through the Psycho Gundam's interface. She joins Tristan with a Qubeley. Her story resembles that of Gundam villains such as Four Murasame, Ple Two, and Quess, she shows signs of being a newtype, as well.

Vladi Zarth - (Uraji Zasu in Japan) pilots the Black Zaku. After the four Dark Alliance generals are defeated, he seizes control with the Neo-Zarth Army, forcing the party to join a sort of resistance to try to end the situation before it gets too far out of hand. Vladi Zarth is the name of Tremmie's older brother, and she believes this man is just using her brother's name. Much of the game is spent looking for him without knowing his appearance.

== Development ==
For the American release of the game certain changes were made. These include name changes, the replacement of the theme song with an instrumental version, and the addition of a full voice cast (the Japanese release used only on-screen text dialogue for the characters).

== Reception ==
Reception

Aggregate score
Aggregator	Score
Metacritic	65/100

Review scores
Publication	Score
Electronic Gaming Monthly	6.33/10
Famitsu	29/40
Game Informer	7.75/10
GamePro	3/5
GameSpot	6.5/10
GameSpy	2/5
GameZone	6.6/10
IGN	6.2/10
Official U.S. PlayStation Magazine	3/5
RPGamer	2/5
RPGFan	75/100

The game received mixed reviews according to the review aggregation website Metacritic. In Japan, Famitsu gave it a score of three sevens and one eight for a total of 29 out of 40.

Japanese sales figures listed the game as the poorest-selling PlayStation 2 Gundam game. Existing Gundam fans have generally been responsive to the game.
