= Odaiba =

Artificial island in Tokyo Bay, Japan

Coordinates: 35.63°N 139.775°E

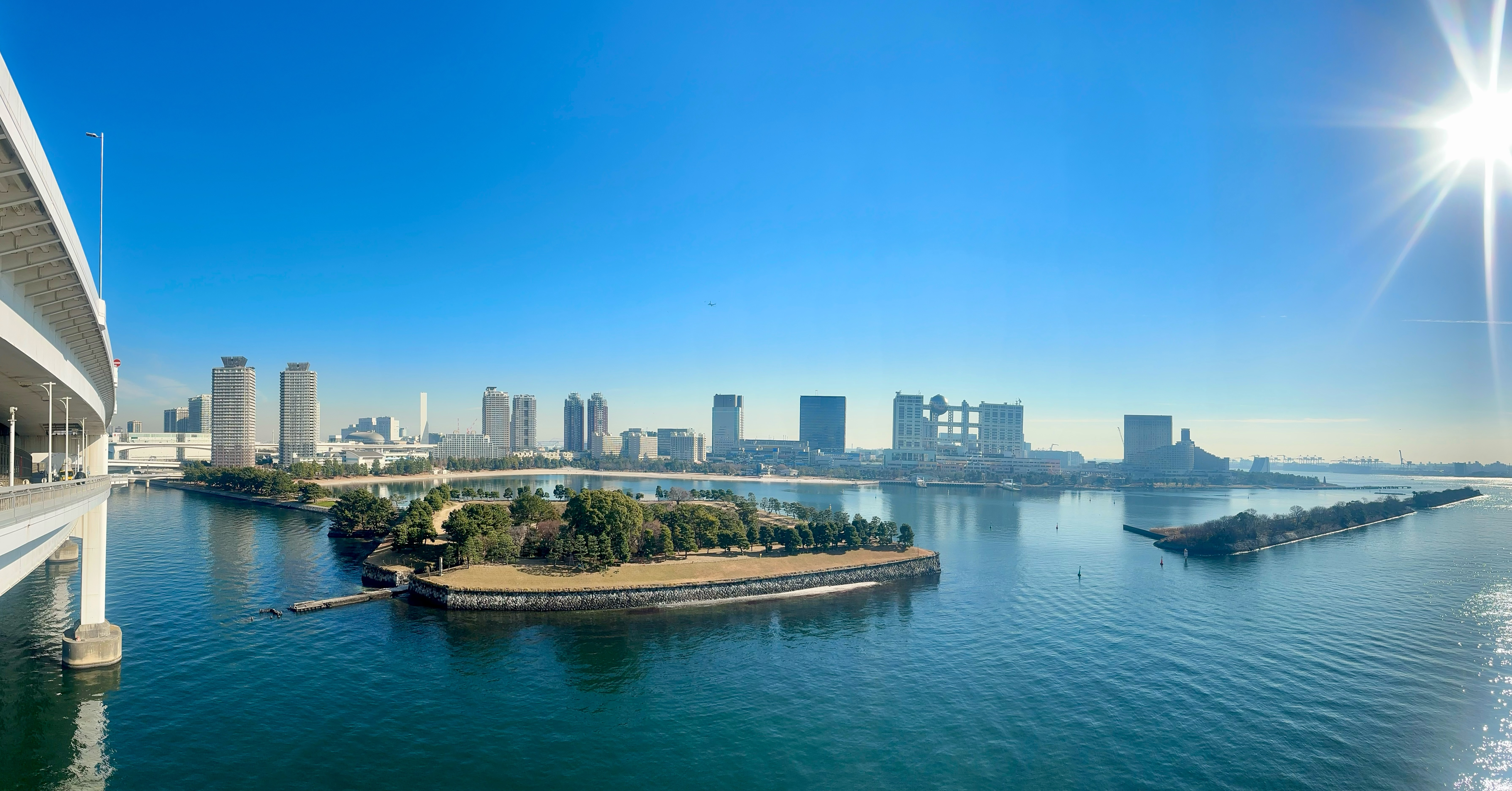
Odaiba as seen from the Rainbow Bridge in 2025

Odaiba (お台場) is a large artificial island in Tokyo Bay, Japan, across the Rainbow Bridge from central Tokyo. Odaiba was initially built for defensive purposes in the 1850s. The land was dramatically expanded during the late 20th century as a seaport district, and was redeveloped in the 1990s into a major commercial, residential and leisure area. Odaiba, along with Minato Mirai 21 in Yokohama, is one of the few manmade seashores in Tokyo Bay where the waterfront is accessible and not blocked by industry and harbor areas.

The majority of the island is located in Tokyo's Kōtō ward, with the north and northwest of the island in Minato and Shinagawa wards. Daiba (台場) formally refers to one district of the island located in Minato. Governor Shintaro Ishihara used Odaiba to refer to the entire Tokyo Waterfront Secondary City Center (東京臨海副都心, Tōkyō Rinkai Fukutoshin), which includes the Ariake and Aomi districts of Kōtō Ward and the Higashi-Yashio district of Shinagawa Ward.

== History ==
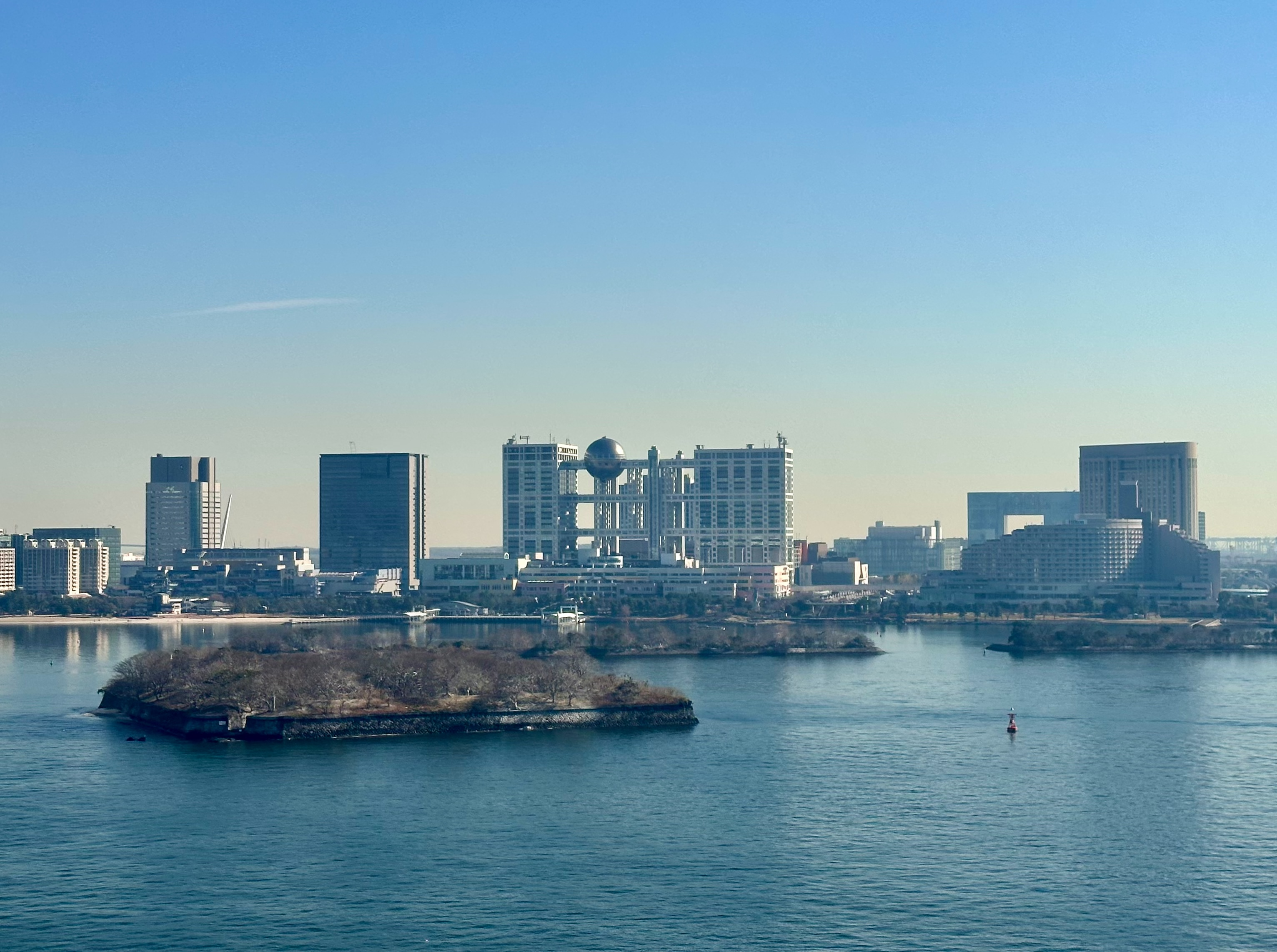
View of Odaiba from the north, with Fuji TV building in the center, shopping malls in the front, and Nikko hotel to the right

=== Battery islands ===
The name Odaiba alludes to daiba (台場; "batteries" / "forts"), which formed small islands nearby. They were constructed in 1853 by Egawa Hidetatsu for the Tokugawa shogunate in order to protect Edo from attack by sea, the primary threat being Commodore Matthew Perry's Black Ships, which had arrived in the same year. In 1928, the Dai-San Daiba (第三台場; No. 3 Battery) was refurbished and opened to the public as the Metropolitan Daiba Park.

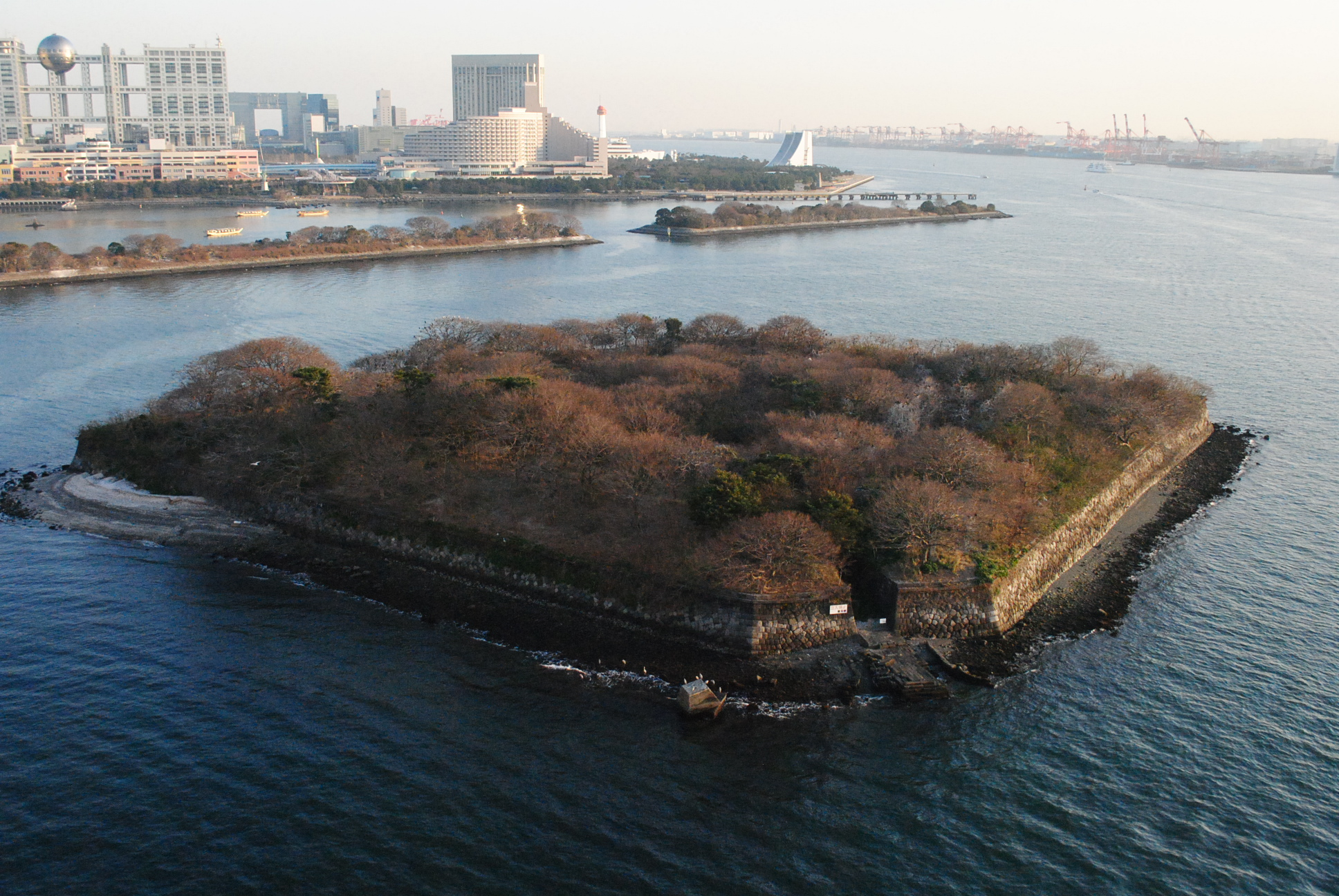
Edo-era Dai-Roku Daiba (第六台場; No. 6 Battery), viewed from the Rainbow Bridge. Background: the developed area of Odaiba.

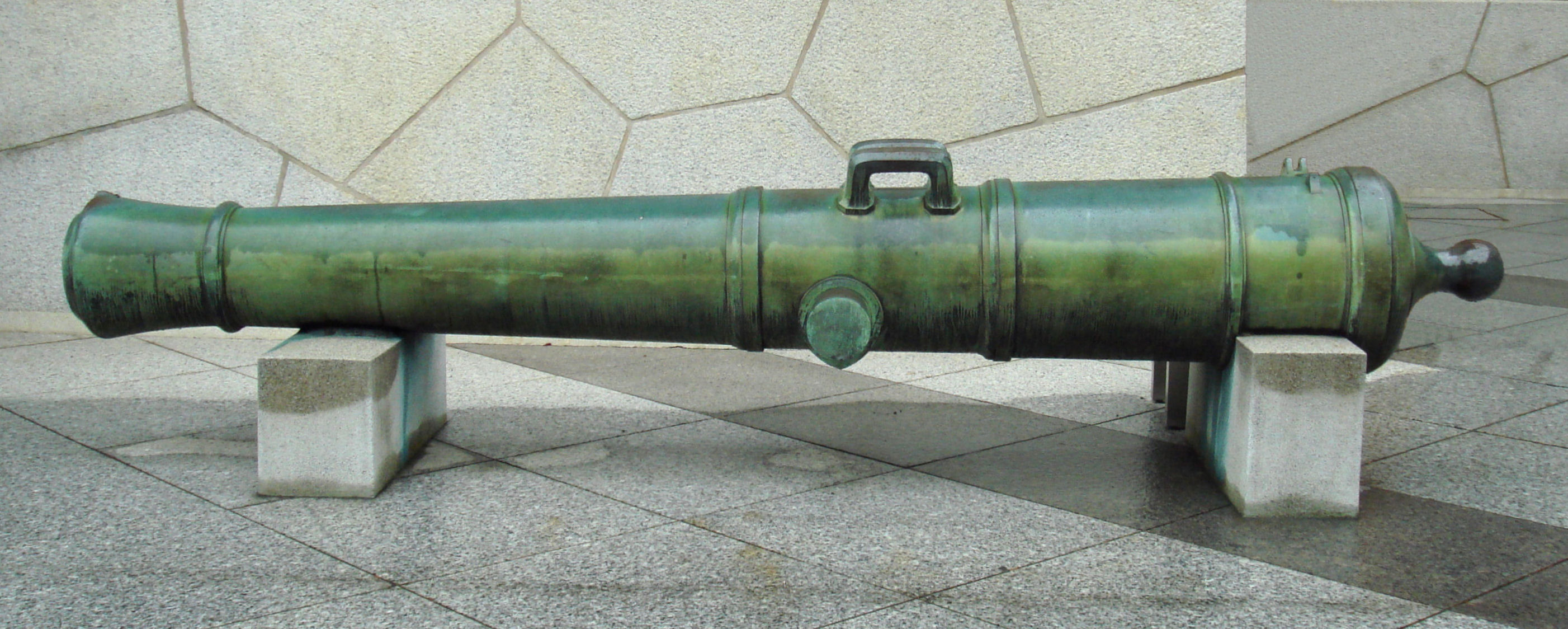
A cannon from Odaiba, now at the Yasukuni Shrine. 80-pound bronze, bore: 250 mm (9.84 in), length: 3,830 mm (150.79 in).

Of the originally planned 11 batteries, seven construction projects started, but only six were ever finished. No. 1 to No. 3 Batteries were completed in eight months in 1853. Construction on Nos. 4 to 7 started in 1854, but only Nos. 5 and 6 were finished by the year's end. Nos. 4 and 7 were abandoned, with 30% and 70% unfinished (respectively), and an alternative land-based battery near Gotenyama was built instead. However, they resumed construction on No. 4 in 1862 and completed it the following year.

Until the mid-1960s, all except two batteries (Nos. 3 and 6) were either removed to facilitate ship navigation or incorporated into Shinagawa port and Tennōzu. In 1979, the "landfill no. 13" (now Minato-ku Daiba, Shinagawa-ku Higashi-Yashio and Kōtō-ku Aomi districts) was finished and connected to the park that was No. 3 Battery. On the other hand, No. 6 was left to nature (access prohibited).

=== Redevelopment ===
The modern island of Odaiba began to take shape when the Port of Tokyo opened in 1941.

Tokyo governor Shunichi Suzuki began a major development plan in the early 1990s to redevelop Odaiba as Tokyo Teleport Town, a showcase for futuristic living, with new residential and commercial development housing a population of over 100,000. The redevelopment was scheduled to be complete in time for a planned "International Urban Exposition" in spring 1996.

Suzuki's successor Yukio Aoshima halted the plan in 1995, by which point over JPY 1 trillion had been spent on the project, and Odaiba was still underpopulated and full of vacant lots. Many of the special companies set up to develop the island became practically bankrupt. The collapse of the Japanese asset price bubble was a major factor, as it frustrated commercial development in Tokyo generally. The area was also viewed as inconvenient for business, as its physical connections to Tokyo—the Rainbow Bridge and the Yurikamome rapid transit line—made travel to and from central Tokyo relatively time-consuming and costly.

The area started coming back to life in the late 1990s as a tourist and leisure zone, with several large hotels and shopping malls. Several large companies including Fuji Television moved their headquarters to the island, and transportation links improved with the connection of the Rinkai Line into the JR East railway network in 2002 and the eastward extension of the Yurikamome to Toyosu in 2006. Tokyo Big Sight, the convention center originally built to house Governor Suzuki's planned intercity convention, also became a major venue for international expositions.

The D1 Grand Prix motorsport series hosted drifting events at Odaiba from 2004 to 2018, 2023, and 2024.

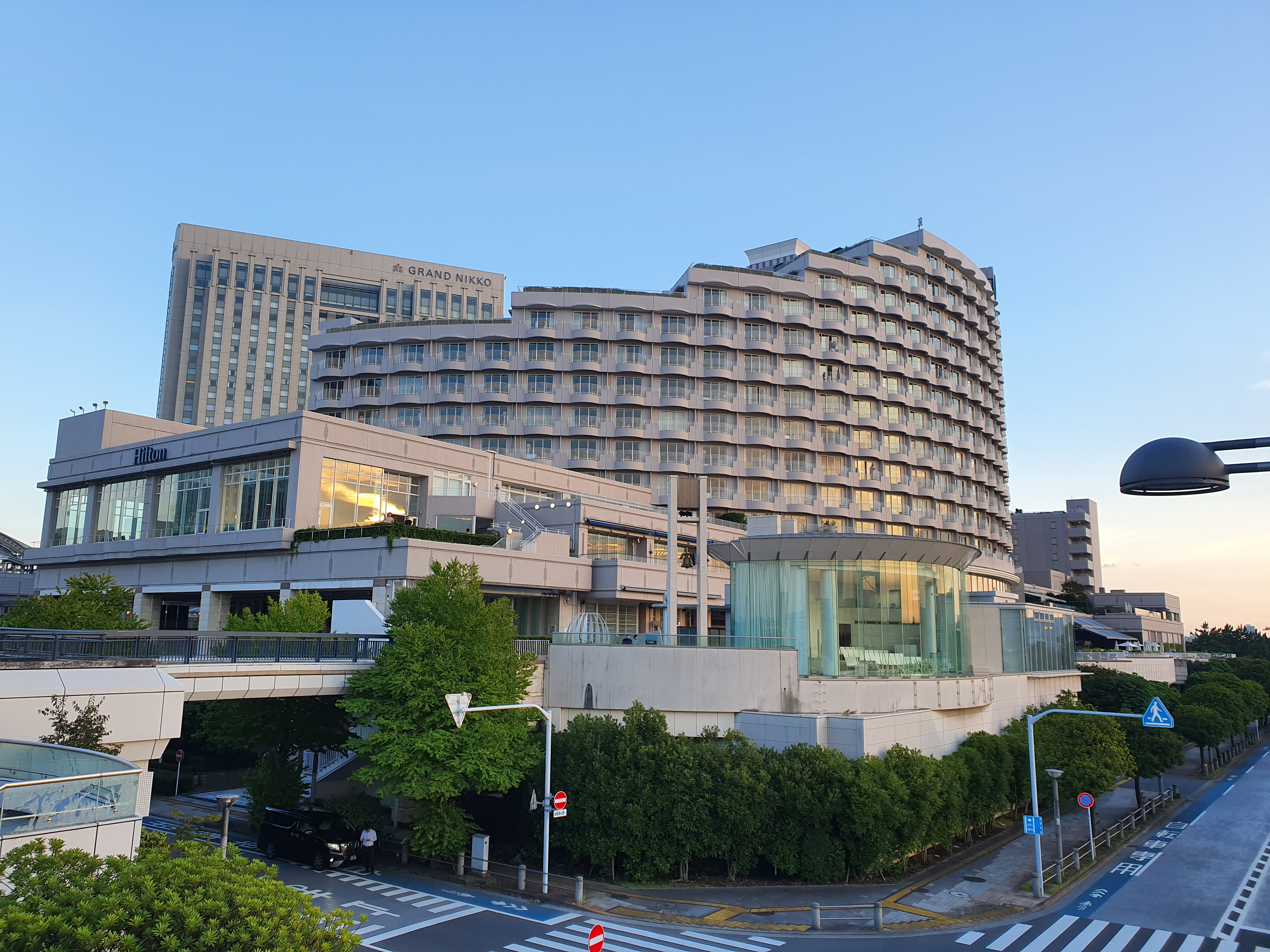
Hilton Tokyo Odaiba

Odaiba was one of the venues for the 2020 Summer Olympics. A temporary arena was built at Shiokaze Park for beach volleyball, and temporary stands were built for the Odaiba Marine Park to hold triathlon and marathon swimming.

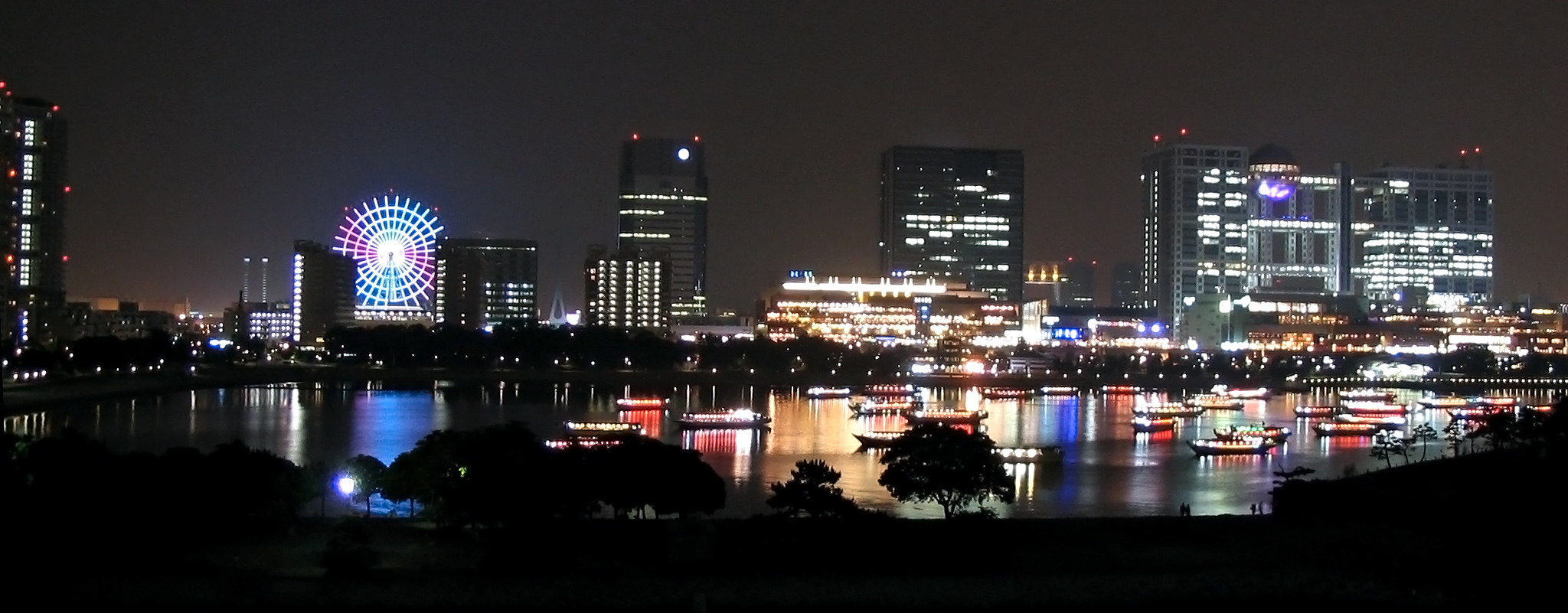
Odaiba at night, with the now removed Daikanransha Ferris wheel and yakatabune boats in the bay foreground, 2004

== Attractions ==
Today's Odaiba is a popular shopping and sightseeing destination for Tokyoites and tourists alike. Major attractions include:

- Fuji Broadcasting Center, the headquarters of Fuji Television, a distinctive building designed by Kenzo Tange
- Miraikan, Japan's National Museum of Emerging Science and Innovation
- Rainbow Bridge, connecting Odaiba to the heart of Tokyo
- Tokyo Big Sight (Tokyo International Exhibition Center)
- Aqua City, a shopping center featuring a chapel, Toys "R" Us and 13-screen United Cinemas
- DiverCity Tokyo Plaza, a shopping center containing Unko Museum Tokyo, the world's first Doraemon Future Department Store (ドラえもん未来デパート), and
  - Gundam Base Tokyo, featuring a 19.7-meter (64.6 feet) tall statue of Gundam
  - another Zepp location (Zepp DiverCity)
- Decks Tokyo Beach shopping mall, featuring Sega Joypolis, Odaiba Takoyaki Museum, Madame Tussauds and Legoland Discovery Center
- Museum of Maritime Science (Fune no kagakukan), with swimming pool
- Shiokaze park with BBQ places and Higashi Yashio park
- Telecom Center Building (MXTV's former headquarters), with observation deck
- One of two beaches in urban Tokyo (swimming prohibited), along with Kasai Rinkai Park in Edogawa Ward
- A replica of the Statue of Liberty
- Panasonic Center, a science and technology showroom
- Sea Forest Waterway, the regatta venue for rowing and canoeing at the 2020 Summer Olympic Games
- A new 150-meter-high, 250-meter-wide fountain will be located in Odaiba Marine Park in March 2026. "The Odaiba Fountain draws inspiration from nature for its design, with its cherry blossom-shaped base. Light and musical water displays will accompany its effects. The project will cost 2.62 billion yen. The Tokyo government estimates that the water show will attract more than 2.5 million visitors annually. Taking into account direct and indirect revenue, this is expected to bring in an additional 9.8 billion yen for the city."
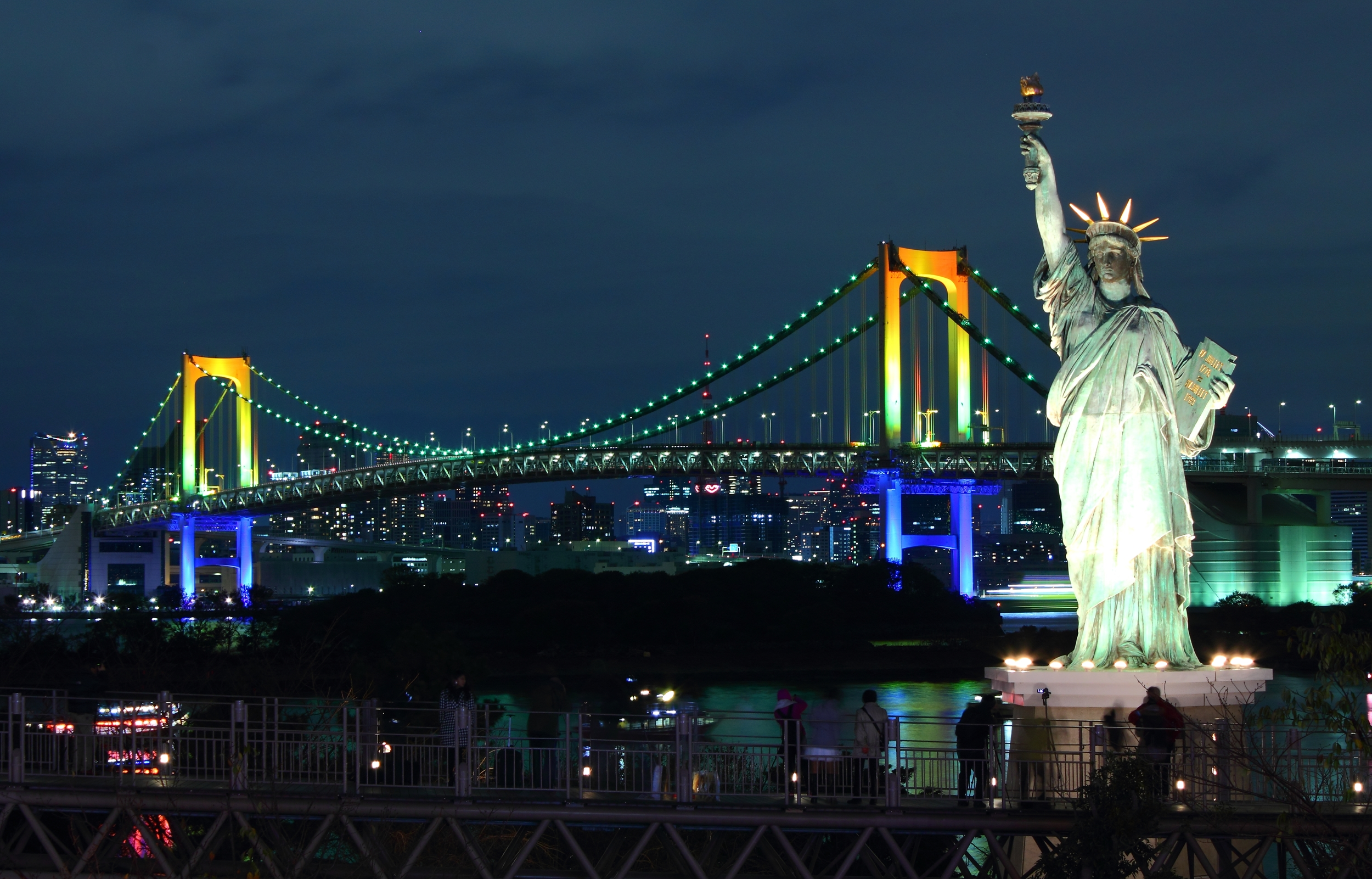
Rainbow Bridge

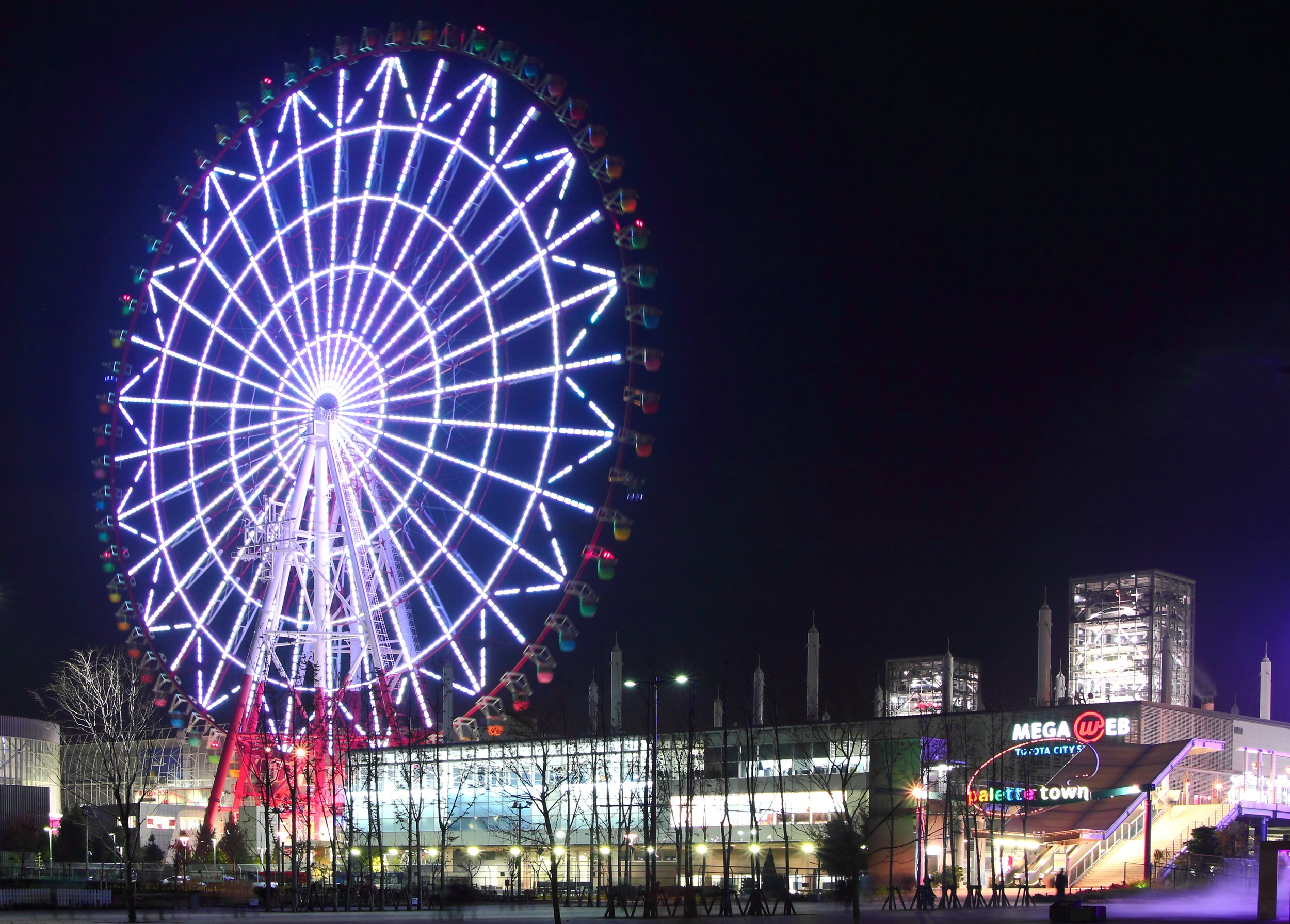
Palette Town (permanently closed)

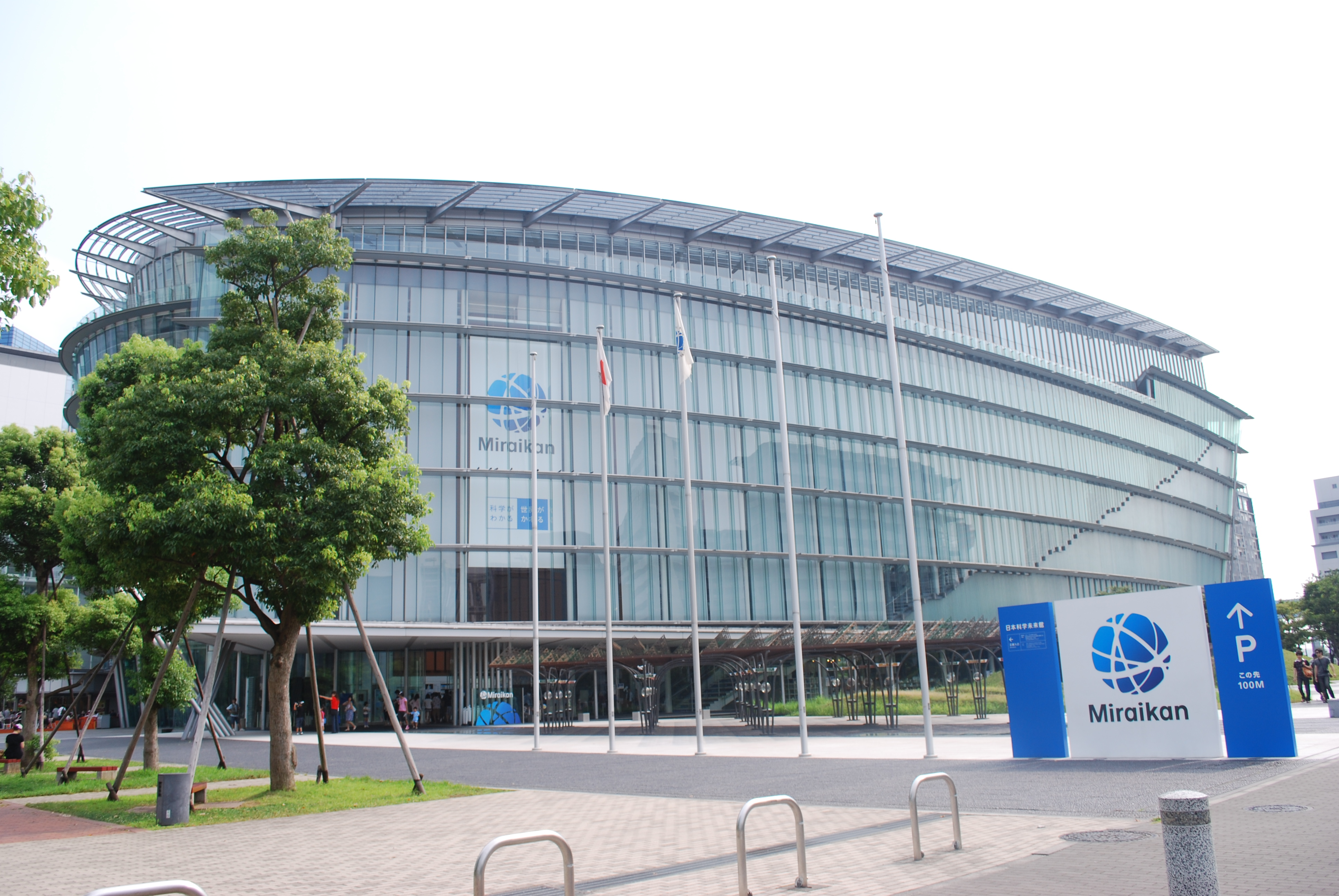
Miraikan

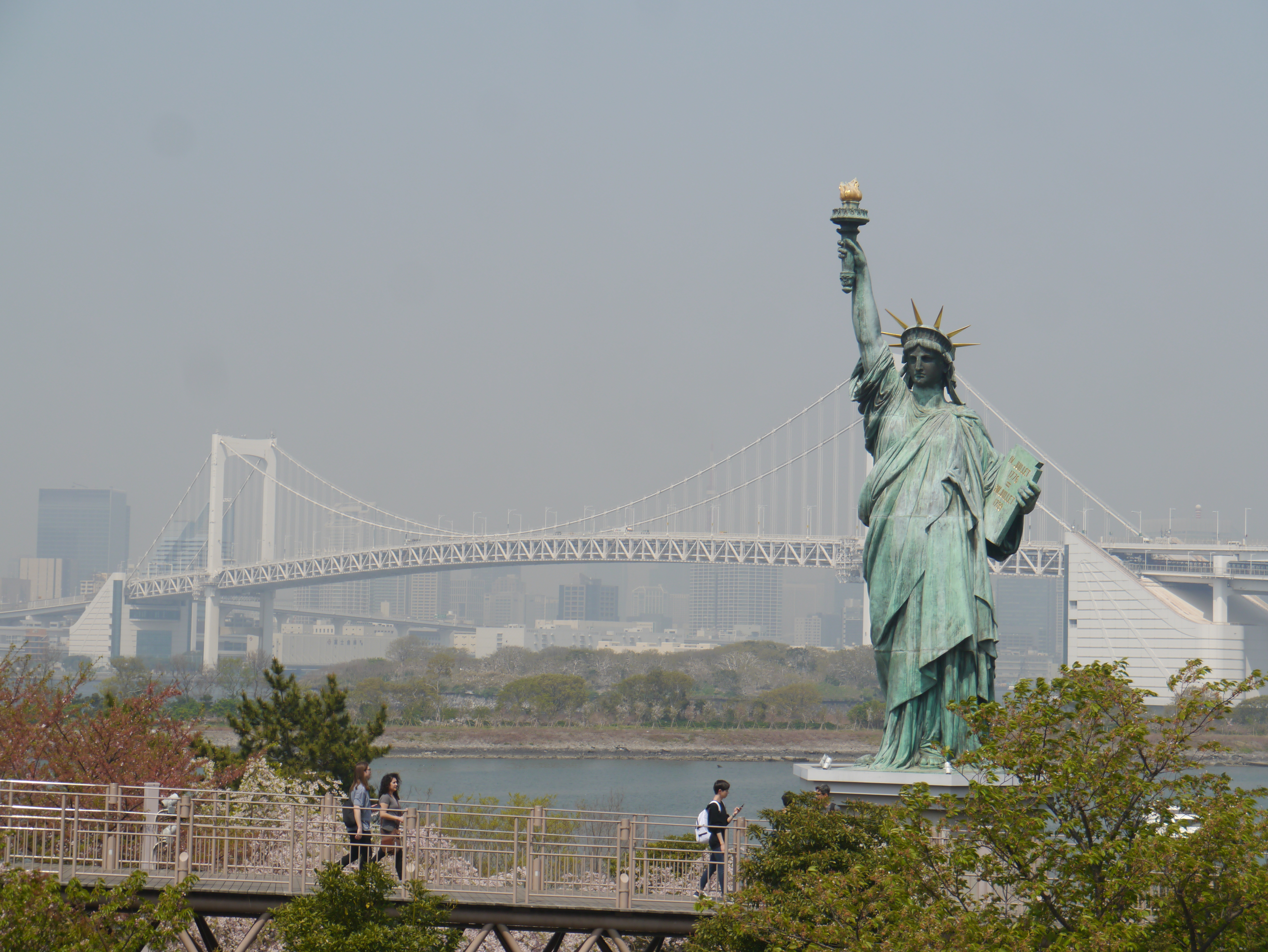
Replica Statue of Liberty with the Rainbow Bridge

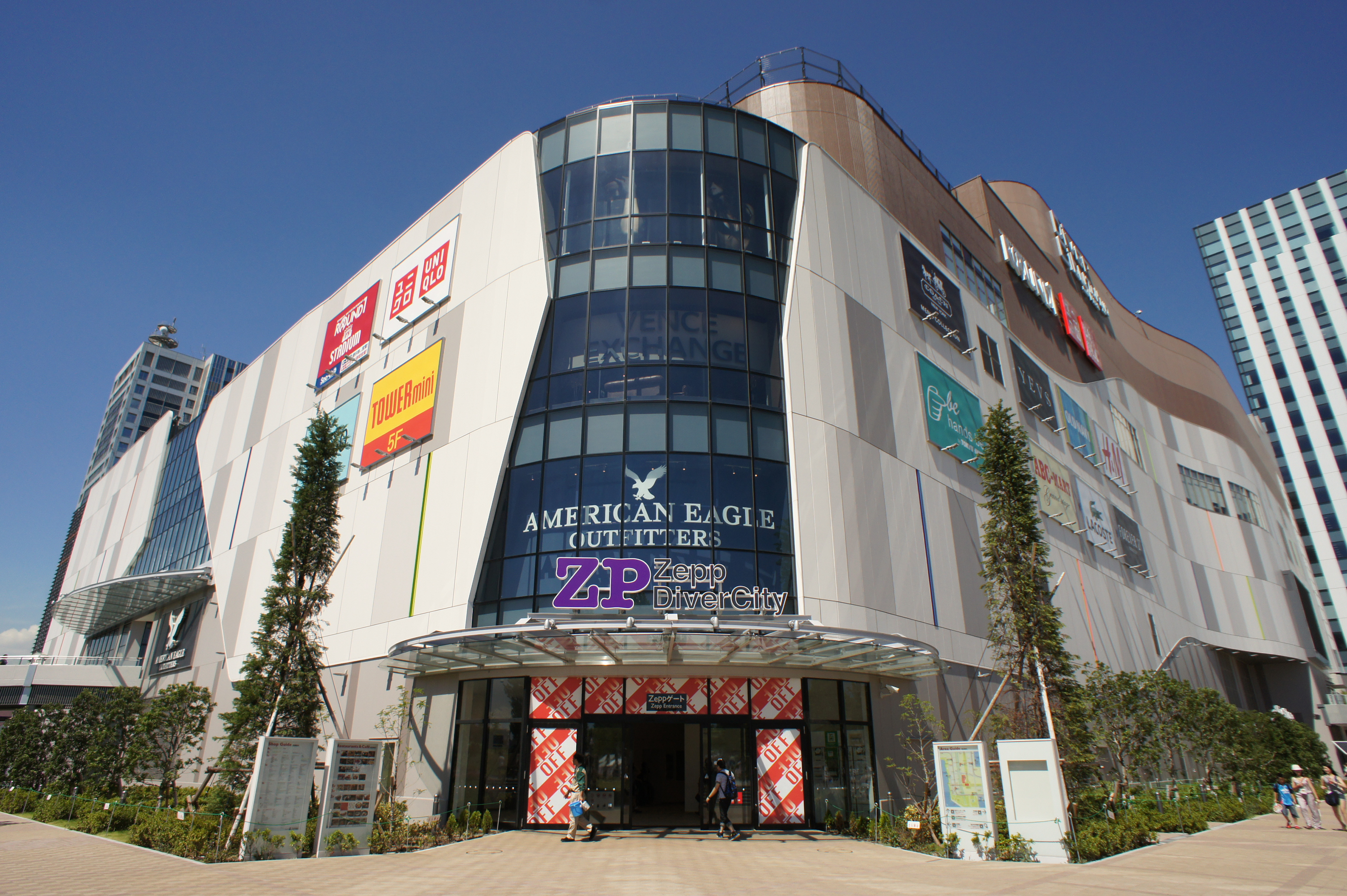
Zepp DiverCity

== Transport ==
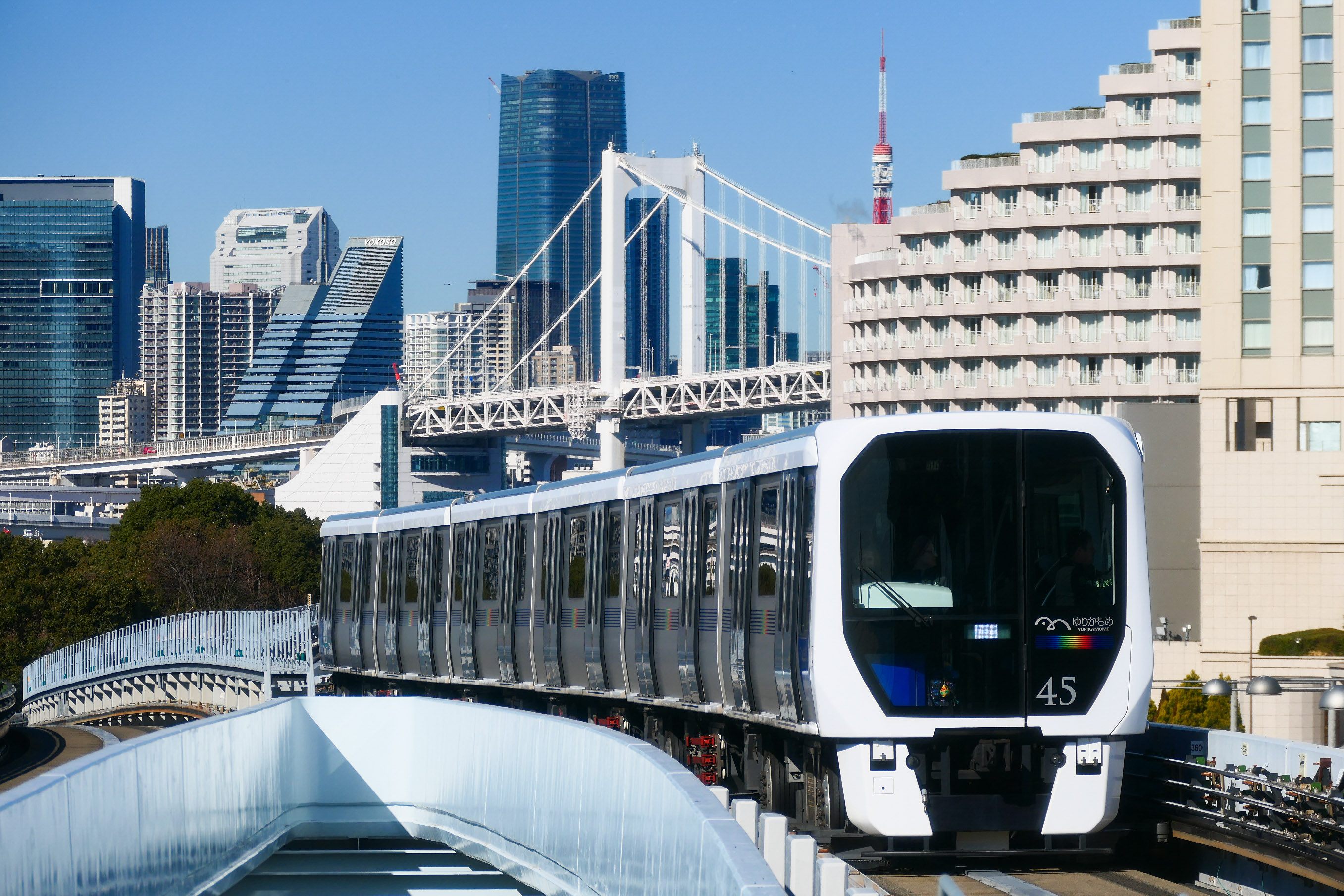
Yurikamome automated guideway transit service

Two Shuto Expressway lines access Odaiba: Route 11 enters from central Tokyo crossing the Rainbow Bridge, while the Bayshore Route enters from Shinagawa Ward through the Tokyo Port Tunnel and from the bayfront areas of Tokyo and Chiba Prefecture to the east.

By public transport, Odaiba is accessible via the automated Yurikamome transit system from Shimbashi and Toyosu. The privately operated Rinkai Line runs between Shin-kiba and Osaki, but many trains connect directly to Shibuya, Shinjuku, and Ikebukuro. City buses provide cheaper if slower access. Ferries connect Odaiba with Asakusa running along the Sumida River and the Kasai Rinkai Park in eastern Tokyo.

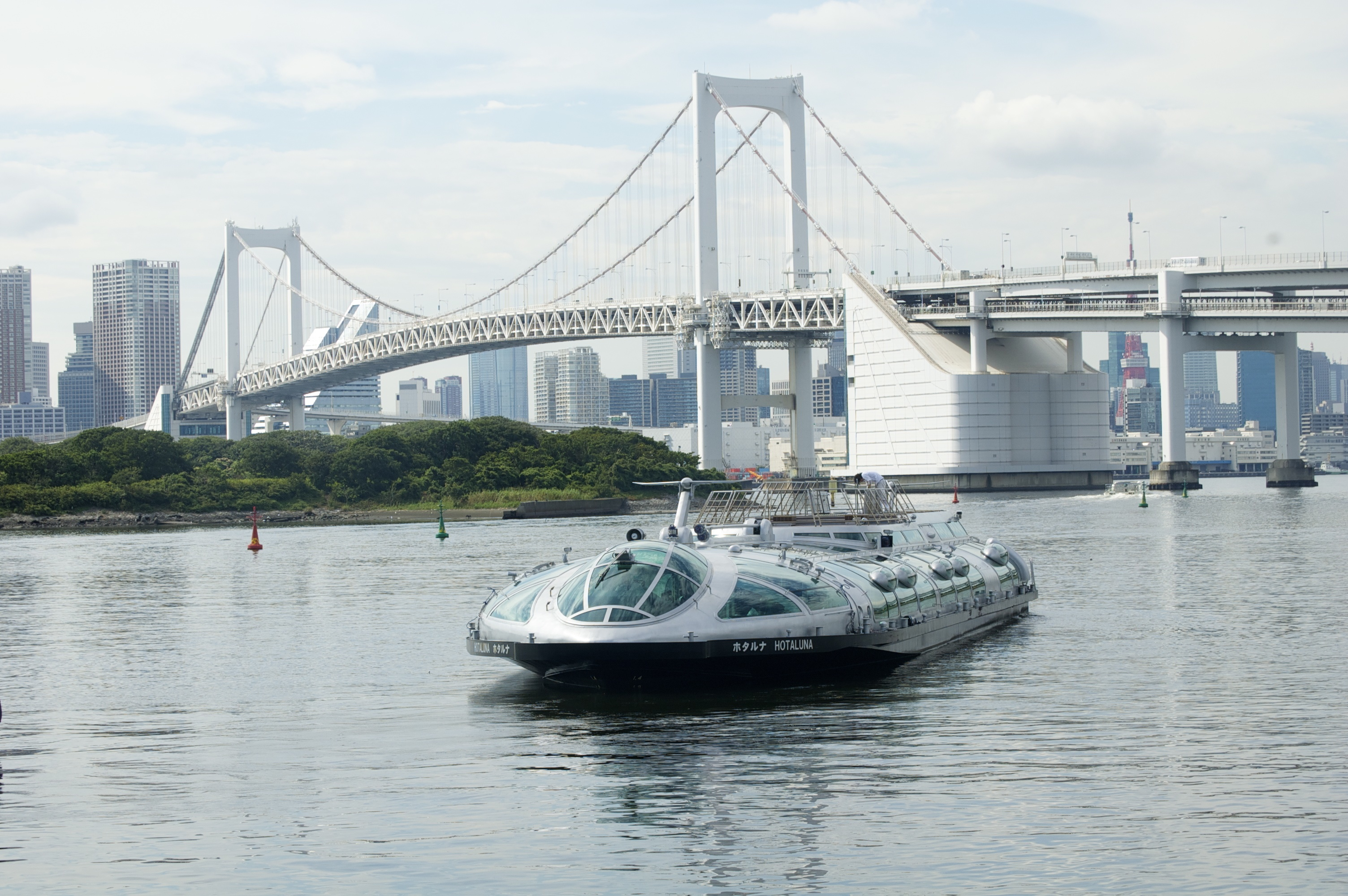
Tokyo Cruise Ship

The Tokyo Cruise Ship is a water bus operator in Tokyo that offers services including public lines as well as event cruises and chartered ships. Such as from Asakusa → Odaiba Seaside Park → Toyosu → Asakusa.

== Cultural references ==
Odaiba, the Rainbow Bridge, and other parts of the surrounding area are a major setting of the Digimon Adventure franchise. The area is noted in many major areas of the plot.

The island is the main location of the multimedia project Love Live! Nijigasaki High School Idol Club. The titular high school is based on Tokyo Big Sight, while landmarks like Diver City, Sega Joypolis, and the Rainbow Bridge are also depicted in the anime. The Gundam statue at Diver City is featured as well since both franchises are produced by Sunrise.

Odaiba may be referenced in the game Slow Damage by NITRO CHiRAL. The plot takes place in a city called Shinkoumi, referenced to previously being part of the Tokyo Waterfront.

Battery No. 6 is used as a key location in the short story "Solitary Isle" by Japanese writer Koji Suzuki included in the Dark Water.

The now-closed Daikanransha Ferris wheel is featured in the credits of the first ending theme of the anime Inuyasha.

== Education ==
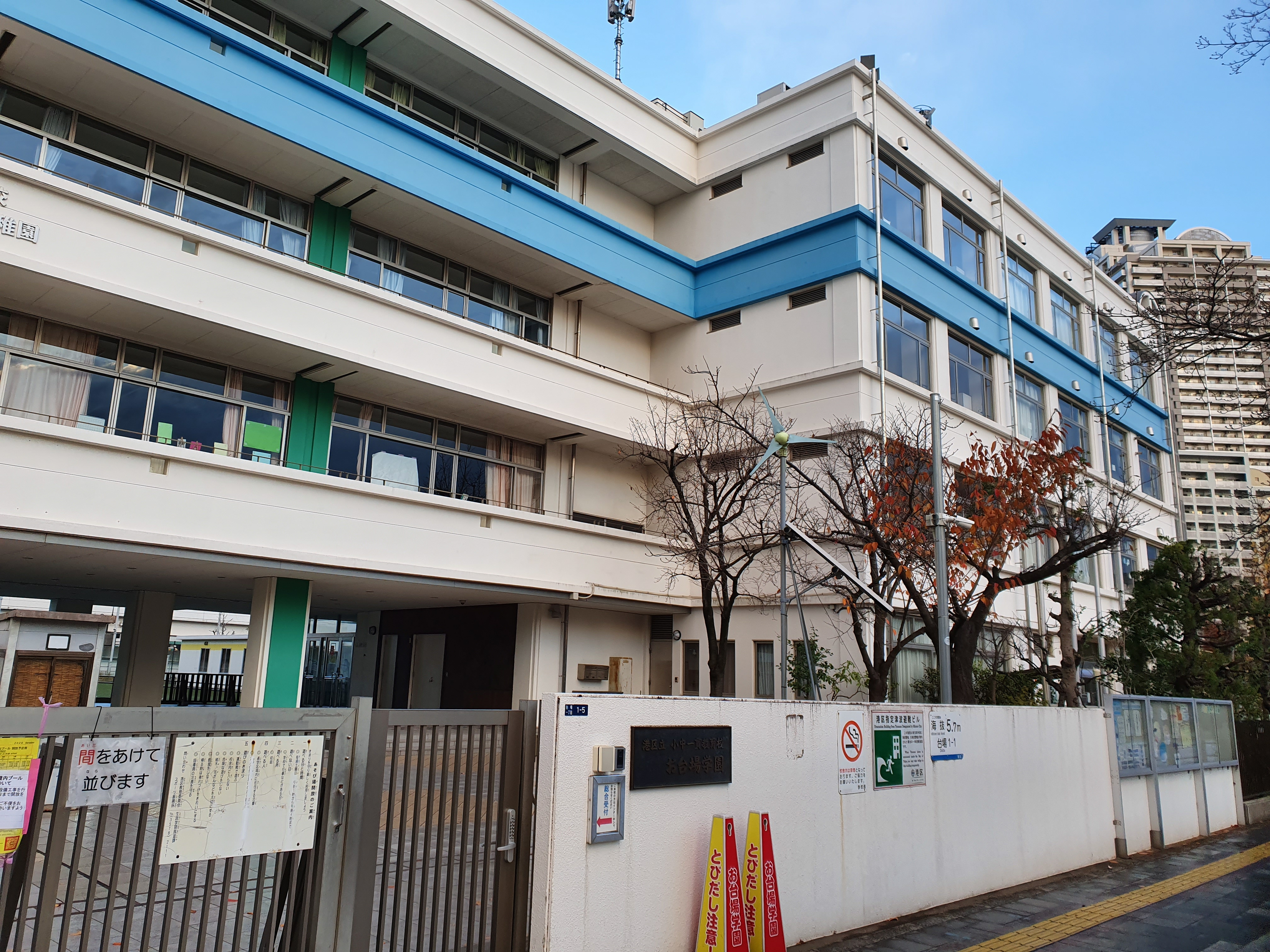
Odaiba Gakuen (お台場学園), the public elementary and junior high school on Odaiba

Minato City Board of Education operates public elementary and junior high schools. Daiba 1-2 chōme 1-5-ban are zoned to Odaiba Gakuen (お台場学園) for elementary and junior high school.
