= Cultural impact of Gundam =

The giant robot anime franchise Gundam is a popular cultural icon in Japan.

Gundam has appeared on postage stamps, the Gundam name was used as a codename for a Japanese Self Defense Force project to develop an advance personal combat system and Gundam has been used to promote technical developments in fire fighting. A tram station has a Gundam statue and plays the theme tune of the first Gundam film as its departure melody. Mitsubishi created a simulator for concept cars themed on a Gundam mech cockpit, held recruitment seminars titled "How to make a Gundam" to demonstrate their development process and based their Lancer Evolution design on Gundam. Isuzu used a Gundam to model the VX2.

== Commercial ==
In 2011, the Los Angeles Times reported that some estimations state that "10 Gundam models [have been] sold for every man, woman and child in Japan." By 2015, Bandai had sold an estimate 450 million units, with nearly 2,000 different Gundam plastic models.

The Gundam franchise had grossed over $5 billion in retail sales by 2000.

== Museums ==
Gundam Base Tokyo is a dedicated museum to Gundam. Among its major attractions is the Gundam Statue of the RX-0 Unicorn Gundam. It features a display collection of over 1000 Gunpla models and the biggest exhibition of Gunpla in the world. In 2012, Robots Gone Bad covered the museum and stated that it houses 90% of the kits ever made. In 2012, a large topiary Gundam made of ten thousand begonias, zinnias, and star daisies was on display to promote the green movement.

=== Gundam statue ===
The Gundam statue or "Odaiba Gundam" has been a major icon of the museum since its unveiling. First completed in June 2009, it stood for a month before being disassembled, but had attracted over 4.5 million visitors during that time. In 2010, it was erected in Shizuoka, and it was shown in pieces in 2011 in order to raise money for the 2011 Tōhoku earthquake and tsunami relief effort.

=== "China Gundam" ===
A large robot statue was debuted in China's Floraland park in 2010, which immediately drew much negative press surrounding its creation as a copy of the original Gundam Statue. According to reports, a spokesperson for the park declared it as "completely original". While it bore a similar design, the robot's bore logos for the EFSF and WB, the 'Earth Federation Space Force' and 'White Base'. The form of the robot was made by a frame that was covered with fabric. In January 2011, the robot was reconstructed with significant alterations which still attracted some negative press on its appearance.

=== Other museums and exhibitions ===
In 2013, the Hyogo Prefectural Museum of Art ran an exhibition featuring over 400 pieces of Kunio Okawara's mechanical design work.

== Academics ==
As part of MHI Jobcon 2005 (Mitsubishi Heavy Industries Job Convention 2005), a recruiting event of Mitsubishi Heavy Industries Ltd, seminars were held in six Japanese cities. The topic of these seminars was "Mobile Suit Gundam Development Story"; which indicated the requirements and processes that Mitsubishi would have to implement if the company had been required to build an RX-78 mobile suit.

On 24 August 2008, a conference was held in Hiroshima with hundreds of academic professionals in different fields joining to discuss about the relationship of anime science and technology with the modern world, including military, economics, linguistics, and the possibility of the Universal Century (human colonizing space). Many envisioned that the technology portrayed in Gundam is not far from our time. One aeronautics expert in the project said thermonuclear rockets and spherical helper bots should be pursued.

=== Magazines ===
The popularity of Gundam resulted in its first specialty magazine, Gundam Magazine, which ran from December 1990 to June 1991. In 2006, the magazine was reprinted in a six volume box set. In 2001, Gundam Ace magazine began publication, moved from a quarterly to a bi-monthly to monthly serialization in 2003. The magazine boasted a circulation of 161,417 copies between October 2008 and September 2009, and 133,584 copies between October 2010 and September 2011 according to the Japan Magazine Publishing Association.

== Industry ==
The concept of Isuzu VX-2 is inspired by RX-178 Gundam Mk-II as concept design arts released in the Jan/Feb 1998, as seen in issue no. 71 of the magazine Axis published in Japan. According to Gundam-san 4 koma comic, the Mitsubishi Lancer Evolution appearance is influenced by the RX-78-2 Gundam. Nissan Chief Creative Officer Shiro Nakamura said that the angular lines and high-tech vents of the GT-R (R35) were inspired by the Japanese anime series Gundam. Mitsubishi has cooperated with Bandai to create a simulator for concept cars, the test-type of this simulator will be decorated like the Gundam cockpit and become a simulation theatre in the Toyota theme park, Mega Web, located in Tokyo.

In 2018, Japanese engineer Masaaki Nagumo from Sakakibara Kikai completed construction of a functional bipedal mecha inspired by the Gundam franchise. The device, standing 8.5 meters tall and weighing about 7 tonnes, possesses fully functional arm and leg servos. In 2023, Japanese robotics company Tsubame Industries unveiled a quadrupedal mecha that was also inspired by the Gundam franchise. Dubbed Archax, the robot weighed 3.5 tons, was 15-foot tall and could be piloted from the inside by a human.

== Military and aerospace ==
The code name for the under-development Japan Self-Defense Forces advanced personal combat equipment is "Gundam". On the display exhibition on 7 November 2007, the equipment of the set contains infra-red camera and scope that can verify if the incoming target is a friend or foe, along with a monitor display that can browse the internet. The equipment has a total weight of 9 kg and the powered suit can run for 8 hours. The testing team consisting of troopers claims that the major improvement should be focused on increasing the battery life of the system. The researchers are also aiming for funnel type systems including missiles that can stay/hover in air and mini scouting robots.

== Government ==
In 2007, Japan's Ministry of Defense presented a paper titled "Towards the Realization of Gundam (Advanced Personal Equipment System)", which Anime News Network noted as using "elements of popular culture to attract young people for recruitment and public relations."

In 2012, Japan's Liberal Democratic Party had discussed the possibility of building a working Gundam, in 2008 the estimated cost to build a Gundam was US$725 million for the parts and materials. During a 12-hour coverage on Nico Nico, Masaaki Taira and Hideki Niwa presented "The Gundam Development Project". Though the event was decried as an attempt to garner the "nerd vote".

The RX-78 Gundam was recognized as a culturally significant subject by the nation of Japan on 23 October 2000, with the inclusion of the suit and the main pilot on two stamps in the 20th Century Stamp Series. On 25 March 2011, a set of 10 stamps called Gunpla Frame Stamp Collection 30th Anniversary was released in Japan. Featuring 10 of the titular Mobile Suit RX-78-2 Gundam's plastic models for 1980 to 2010. Additionally, the mobile suit and other notable mecha from various Gundam series were recognized in the second set of "Anime Heroes and Heroines" stamps, released in 2005. It was one of only four franchises to be given the honor; the others were Pokémon, Galaxy Express 999, and Detective Conan.

The RX-78-2 Gundam and 2 Medea transport planes were featured in a fire fighting poster in Japan. The RX-78-2 was equipped with water spraying equipment instead of weapons.

== Tram station monument ==
In 2008, a RX-78 Gundam monument was displayed at Kami-Igusa Station.

== Gunpla Builders World Cup ==
There is a yearly tournament that is held in 16 countries since 2011 that has various hobbyists submitting their very own custom built Gunpla Models.

== Ink and wash painting ==
In 2008, the ink and wash painting of Gundam drawn by Hisashi Tenmyouya in 2005 was sold in the Christie's auction held in Hong Kong with a price of US$600,000.

== 30th Anniversary music ==
Throughout 2009, Japanese record labels released various albums to honor the 30th anniversary of Gundam. The first of these albums was album I, Senshi: Ai Senshi Tribute, featuring various covers of the song "Ai Senshi" from the Soldiers of Sorrow film. American musician Andrew W.K. released an album called Gundam Rock on 9 September 2009 in Japan. The album consists of covered music from the Gundam series to celebrate its 30th anniversary. Lantis also had several of its artists including JAM Project, CooRie, Minami Kuribayashi, and Faylan record covers of various theme songs, producing Gundam Tribute from Lantis. Other albums were

- Gundam 30th Custom
- 2009 'Tobe! Gundam' & 'Eien ni Amuro': covers of the opening and ending themes featuring Akira Asakura of Romantic Mode, Mami Ayukawa, Yoshifumi Ushima of Top Gun, Tomohisa Kawazoe of Top Gun & Lindberg, TSUKASA, Jyosei Nagatomo of infix, MIQ, Hiroko Moriguchi, and Chihiro Yonekura
- Moeagare! Gundam Brass by Naoto Ohtomo leading the Tokyo Symphony Brass
- Gundam World Dance Track 0079
- Gundam Unplugged: Acogui de Gundam A.C.2009
- Gundam Symphony by Toshihiko Sahashi leading the London Symphony Orchestra
- Gundam Songs 145, a 10-disc box set featuring every piece of Gundam theme music up until the 30th anniversary and a special book detailing the musicians

== MTR X Gundam ==
The Hong Kong MTR issued a special set of tickets featuring Gundam theme in December 2009.

== "Char Custom" ==
There are many products that have special "Char Custom" editions in Japan, which are normally a red version of a product with Zeon emblems. This imitates the custom mobile suits, particularly a red (rather than green) MS-06S Zaku II Commander Type, used by Char Aznable, a main character aligned with the Zeon forces in the first few Gundam series. Such examples include a red Nintendo GameCube and Game Boy Advance SP.

== See also ==
- List of highest-grossing media franchises
