= Gundam (fictional robot) =

Fictional manned robot in the anime series Mobile Suit Gundam

- Mobile Suit Gundam character
- Original illustration of the RX-78-2 Gundam, designed by Kunio Okawara
- First appearance: Mobile Suit Gundam ep. #01, "Gundam Rising"
- Created by: Yoshiyuki Tomino; Kunio Okawara
- Class: Mobile suit
- Designation: RX-78-2 Gundam
- Pilots: Amuro Ray; Sayla Mass; Tem Ray (Gihren's Greed); Mercury Promenade (Gundam: The Battle Master); Tokio Kurono (Mobile Suit Gundam Alive); Aiko Anna Pruna (Mobile Suit Gundam Alive); Tristan (MS Saga: A New Dawn); Char Aznable (Mobile Suit Gundam GQuuuuuuX); Shuji Ito (Mobile Suit Gundam GQuuuuuuX); Shiro Kyoda (Plamo-Kyoshiro); Takeshi Iori (Gundam Build Fighters); Hiroto Kuga (Gundam Build Divers Re:Rise)

In-universe information
- Affiliation: Earth Federation: Earth Liberation Organization Army (Mobile Suit Gundam Alive); Eisengrad Army (MS Saga: A New Dawn)
- 60 mm Vulcan Guns ×2; Beam Sabers ×2; Beam Rifle; Beam Javelin; Hyper Bazooka; Gundam Hammer; Hyper Hammer
- Height: 18 meters (appr. 60 feet)
- Weight: 43.4 tons

The RX-78-2 Gundam (Japanese: RX-78-2 ガンダム, Hepburn: Āru Ekkusu Nanajū Hachi no Ni Gandamu) is a piloted mecha introduced in 1979 in Yoshiyuki Tomino's and Sunrise's anime series Mobile Suit Gundam. In the series, it is a prototype weapon used by the Earth Federation. The mecha ends up in the hands of Amuro Ray, the son of Tem Ray, who designed the Gundam. Amuro Ray goes on to pilot the mecha for the Earth Federation in their war against the Principality of Zeon.

This model was the first in the Gundam franchise. Its design was the first of many variations in subsequent works. Many future Gundams use the RX-78-2's color scheme and general shape.

== Conception and design ==
Initially, the concept for the RX-78's was a powered armor, and was the primary design for Yoshiyuki Tomino's proposed series Freedom Fighter Gunboy. The series later changed its name to Mobile Suit Gundam and Kunio Okawara was given Tomino's concept to shape into a finalized design for the anime. Okawara created multiple designs before settling on the current, samurai-styled design for the anime in 1979.

Enemies in the series regularly refer to the RX-78-2 as the white suit or the White Devil (due to the suit's formidable battle performance) despite it being a mix of blue, red, and white. Tomino's response in the novel version of Gundam is that the original design was to be a grayscale machine, made up of mostly white and light gray colouring. However, Sunrise disapproved of the colouring and insisted the unit be painted in brighter colors like other super robot anime at that time.

The Japan Self-Defense Forces built an approximately full scale RX-78-3 Gundam (named after the use of helium-3 fuel) with styrofoam in its show and contains a simulation pod.

== Variants, successors and legacy ==
Due to being the first Gundam in the franchise, it follows that a lot of mobile suits take inspiration from its design.

- The RGM-79 GM first appeared in the original series. With the Gundam's original purpose being an experimental prototype, the GM is its mass-production variant. The GM's design largely cuts away ornamental features like the v-fin in favor of a slimmed down design.
- The RX-78 Prototype Gundam (Initial Prototype Model)
- The RX-78-1 Prototype Gundam is a first Gundam-type Mobile Suit which was conceptualized as the precursor to the RX-78-2. It appears within "Mobile Suit Variations", a series part "Operations V" project development which describes mobile suits not depicted by the television series. Another design of this suit, numbered RX-78-01 appears in Gundam the Origin from parallel version universal century.
- The FA-78 Full Armor Gundam is an variation RX-78-2 Gundam in MSV suit wearing green armour armed weapons system which later appeared in Thunderbolt from alternative universal century with different armour weapons system.
- The PF-78-1 Perfect Gundam was first featured in the manga Plamo-Kyoshiro as an RX-78-2 model kit modified with armor and a shoulder-mounted water cannon. Later it was brought into the Universal Century as a design that was considered for improvements on the RX-78-2.
- The RX-78-2 Gundam Real Type is a color variant of the RX-78-2 Gundam. It first appeared on a poster for Mobile Suit Gundam II: Soldiers of Sorrow and was given additional background information in Mobile Suit Variations-R.
- The RX-78-2 Gundam C-Armor
- The RX-78-2 Solomon Express G-2
- The RX-78-2 Gundam High Mobility Type
- The RX-78Opt Gundam G-Dash
- The RX-78-2 Gundam + Guntank B parts (nicknamed Gundam Tank) is a combination with the B part torso Guntank replace from damage RX-78-2 legs feature in original game Gundam 0079: The War for Earth
- The RX-78-2 Gundam + B parts (nicknamed Gundam Sky) is a combination with the G-Fighter with RX-78-2 that appears in the TV series but not the movies.
- The RX-79 [G] Gundam Ground Type is Ground Combat Gundam-type mobile suit for plan mass production development mobile suit was featured in the OVA Mobile Suit Gundam: The 08th MS Team.
- The RX-78-NT Gundam NT-1 (nicknamed the Alex), was featured in the OVA War in the Pocket. It was designed as part "G4" projects mobile suit development to be sent to Amuro as a replacement for the aging RX-78-2, it was test piloted by Christina Mackenzie but ultimately destroyed.
- The RX-78A1 Gundam II featured in Hobby Japan January 1989 issue, a prototype mobile suit developed by Anaheim Electronics' technical team at the end of the Gryps War. The development concept was to improve upon the famous RX-78-2 Gundam, but to meet the required performance specifications, the frame of the MSN-00100 Hyaku Shiki, developed by the same company, was redesigned and used, essentially a "Hyaku Shiki in Gundam skin." This unit was delivered to Karaba as the successor to the MSK-008 Dijieh, becoming Amuro Rays personal machine.
- The RX-78GP01 Gundam GP01 Zephyranthes a successor of RX-78-2 Gundam was first featured in the OVA Stardust Memory. A new Gundam-type as part "GP Project", (Gundam Development Project) from Anaheim Electronics it was pilot by Kou Uraki, like similar previous predecessor but the Characteristics design is different from previous first Gundam.
- The RX-178 Gundam MK-II a next successors RX-78-2 Gundam featured as a key mobile suit in Mobile Suit Zeta Gundam, being piloted by protagonist Kamille Bidan in its first half and continuing to be used throughout it and Mobile Suit ZZ Gundam. Three units prototypes were produced by the Titans faction, improving on aspects of the original with technology such as a moving inner frame and a panoramic cockpit. All three units were later stolen by the Anti Earth Union Group (A.E.U.G) and one of them was given a new paint scheme while the other two were dismantled and studied.
- The RX-93 v Gundam (aka Nu Gundam) was featured in Mobile Suit Gundam: Char's Counterattack a successor old RX-78-2 Gundam new final plan design mobile suit prototype was finished its so equipment system Psycho Frame and finn Funnel's
- The RX-0 Unicorn Gundam was featured in Mobile Suit Gundam Unicorn a successors between RX-93 and RX-78-2 as part "UC" projects
- The F90 Gundam F90

== Alternate designs of RX-78-2 Gundam ==
- A redesigned iteration of the RX-78-2 Gundam by Hajime Katoki, referred to as Ver.Ka, is featured in merchandise such as the Master Grade line of model kits and the Gundam Fix Figuration line of figures.
- A version parallel counterpart of RX-78-2 (or named is RX-78-02 Gundam) in featured manga interpretation reboot Mobile Suit Gundam: The Origin. It features the same design characteristics as the original, with more detail in the armor and the lack of a Core Block system. Its weapon loadout is split between "Early" and "Middle/Late" types as the war shifted from ground to space.
- Another iteration RX-78-2 (RX-78 Gundam) with a sleeker design is featured in the anime shorts series Gundam Evolve.
- A version RX-78-2 Gundam (called Gundam G40 (Industrial Design Ver.) ) designed by mechanical engineer Ken Okuyama is featured in Mobile Suit Gundam G40, a short film anime and model kit to celebrate the franchise's 40th anniversary. The design was meant to mimic realistic human movement similar to the original series.
- A version incarnation RX-78-2 called RX-78F00 Gundam (or dubbed Yokohama Gundam) a moving statue mobile statue that stood attached to a Gundam Dock (G-Dock) at the Gundam Factory Yokohama.
- Gunboy-Wilbur is a "Machining Skin" featured in For the Barrel, a novel interpretation of the original series serialized in Newtype Magazine.
- Another version incarnation RX-78-2 is Gundam (Amuro Legacy) feature in short anime 3D CGI Ring of Gundam same charactersis design white all pure coloured armour suit from previous old universal century.

=== gMS-α Red Gundam ===
A more mechanical design created by Ikuto Yamashita for Mobile Suit Gundam GQuuuuuuX, set during an alternate reality version of the Universal Century timeline. In this incarnation, Char Aznable steals the RX-78-2 Gundam (or so called RX-78-02 White Gundam) and modifies it with a red color scheme, psycommu systems, and funnel bits from the abandoned Elmeth project, allowing the Principality of Zeon to win the One Year War. While it disappeared during the final battle along with Char, it reappears in U.C. 0085 piloted by Shuji Ito, kickstarting the main plot later it was pilot again by Char self during in final battle.

== RX-78-2 Gundam in video games ==
- The RX-78-Z1 Zeon's Gundam this is an original features Game strategy in Gihren's Greed. In an alternate official timeline where Zeon won the One Year War, Zeon's Gundam was constructed from the design plans of the RX-78-2 Gundam taken from the Earth Federation (GAMES MSV) suggests that they were found in Jaburo's factories). Although identical in appearance to the RX-78-2 (except for its green Zeon paint scheme and use of MS-14A Gelgoog's shield), its interior mechanisms were completely revamped and featured parts derived from Zeon technology. However, despite these modifications, there were no significant changes to the machine's performance. During the last weeks of the One Year War, the focus of the war effort shifted to outer space. Despite this many Zeon soldiers and mobile suit units continued to operate on Earth. One such Zeon mobile suit team was successful in their ambush of a Medea supply unit and their capture of an RX-78-2 Gundam unit. The captured unit was re-designated RX-78-Z1, repainted in the standard Green Zeon colors and was subsequently used against the Federation a number of times to great effect. For some time, the Gundam wreaked havoc amongst Earth Federation forces on Earth until a Federation Special Forces Combat Unit was able to intercept the stolen Gundam in New York and destroy it. Despite the victory for the Federation unit, the stolen Gundam shot down nearly two dozen RGM-79［G］ GM Ground Type and RX-79［G］ Gundam Ground Type units before it was destroyed.
- The RX-78/C.A. Casval's Gundam One another original same features in Gihren's Greed. In an alternate official timeline, the RX-78/C.A. Casval's Gundam was created by Neo Zeon for Casval's use, and utilized technologies from both the Earth Federation and Principality of Zeon. Meant to be a symbol for Newtypes, it has a reddish paint scheme like the other mobile suits used previously by Casval. Besides the paint scheme, the performance of Casval's Gundam was also tuned to match his preferences, resulting in it having better mobility and reaction speed than the original RX-78-2 Gundam.In one of the parallel timelines depicted in the game Gihren's Greed, Char Aznable reverts to his real name of Casval Rem Deikun near the end of the One Year War. He then leads a new faction, Neo Zeon (different from the original Axis Neo Zeon in Mobile Suit ZZ Gundam), against the Principality of Zeon to realize his Newtype ideals. To that end, the RX-78/C.A. Casval's Gundam was developed by Neo Zeon for Char's use and as a symbol for Newtypes. Records showed that this unit has entered combat with the original RX-78-2 Gundam.
- The RX-78T Gundam Titans Version (nickname G-Titans) another original features in Gihren's Greed. In one of the "What-if" scenarios of the original Gihren's Greed game, the Titans was formed much earlier and the RX-78T Gundam Titans Version was developed prior to the development of the "RX-178 Gundam Mk-II". Compared to the original RX-78-2 Gundam, the RX-78T Gundam Titans Version has much higher performance at the cost of shorter operating time. The Gundam Titans Version was developed by Anaheim Electronics for the Titans in exchange for top secret information on the RX Project and Operation V.
- The RX-78-2 Gundam (fully equipped) It original appears in the game "Mobile Suit Gundam: Gihren's Ambition - Axis's Threat V". The subtitle is for the Tem Ray Army scenario. Piloted by of leader Tem Ray.
- The RX-78-2 Gundam (Famicom Color) A machine that appeared in the limited edition color version plastic model commemorating the release of Mobile Suit Gundam: MS Battlefront 0079.

== RX-78-2 Gundam like (First Gundam-type) in Alternate Universe World ==
- The OZX-GU01A Gundam Geminass 01
- The OZX-GU02A Gundam Geminass 02
- The System-∀99 ∀ Gundam - feature in Turn A Gundam from "Correct Century" timeline universe
- The GAT-X105 Strike Gundam - feature in Mobile Suit Gundam SEED from "Cosmic Era" timeline universe, a prototype Gundam-type mobile suit X-100 Frames standard development built by Earth Alliance Force a part "G project" series, a multi-mode weapons system called "Strike Pack" between air space gravity combat, close-counter-combat and land
- The GAT-X102 Duel Gundam
- The MBF-P01 Gundam Astray Gold Frame
- The MBF-P02 Gundam Astray Red Frame
- The MBF-P03 Gundam Astray Blue Frame
- The MBF-P04 Gundam Astray Green Frame
- The ZGMF-X56S Impulse Gundam
- The GAT-FJ108 Raigo Gundam
- The GN-000 0 Gundam
- The CB-001 1 Gundam
- The GNY-001 Gundam Astraea
- The GNY-004 Gundam Plutone
- The GN-001 Gundam Exia
- The GN-004 Gundam Nadleeh
- The AGE-1 Gundam AGE-1 Normal
- The AGE-1 Gundam AGE-1 Daiki Version
- The X-EX01 Gundam Calibarn
- The XGF-02 Gundam Lfrith
- The XVX-016 Gundam Aerial
- The XARX-0 Gundam ZERO - a new Gundam-type Experimental Prototype Mobile Suit feature in Mobile Suit Gundam RG: XARX-ZERO from "After Apocalypse" timeline universe, this machine devepl

== Other media and merchandise ==
=== Pop culture ===
The RX-78-2 Gundam is one of the basic units that appear in the Super Robot Wars series, representing the Gundam franchise alongside series mainstays Mazinger and Getter Robo.

The RX-78-2 also makes multiple cameo appearances in the anime Sgt. Frog.

The RX-78-2 Gundam appeared in the film Ready Player One (2018), where one of the protagonists controls the RX-78-2 to battle Mechagodzilla.

On October 23, 2000, Japan included the RX-78 Gundam and Amuro Ray in the 20th Century Stamp Series. This mobile suit and other notable machines from various Gundam series were also recognized in the second set of "Anime Heroes and Heroines" stamps, released in 2005. Other franchises and series included were Pokémon, Galaxy Express 999, and Detective Conan.

=== Promotions ===
The RX-78-2 Gundam & 2 Medea transport planes were featured in a fire fighting poster in Japan. The RX-78-2 was equipped with water spraying equipment.

On July 16, 2010, to June 30, 2011, ANA launched a series of flights as part of the 30th anniversary of Gunpla. Called the "ANA x GUNDAM Sky Project," the promotion used specially painted Boeing 777s on domestic and international flights. The initial flight was from Tokyo to Osaka. Promotional model kits include 1/144 scale versions of the RX-78-2, Gundam 00 Raiser, and Unicorn Gundam, as well as a 1/48 scale RX-78-2, all molded in ANA colors.

Promotional food based on the Gundam include Pocky, Pepsi, McDonalds, and Cup Noodles. Food promotions usually tie into merchandise, including exclusive model kits or miniature statues.

=== Statues ===
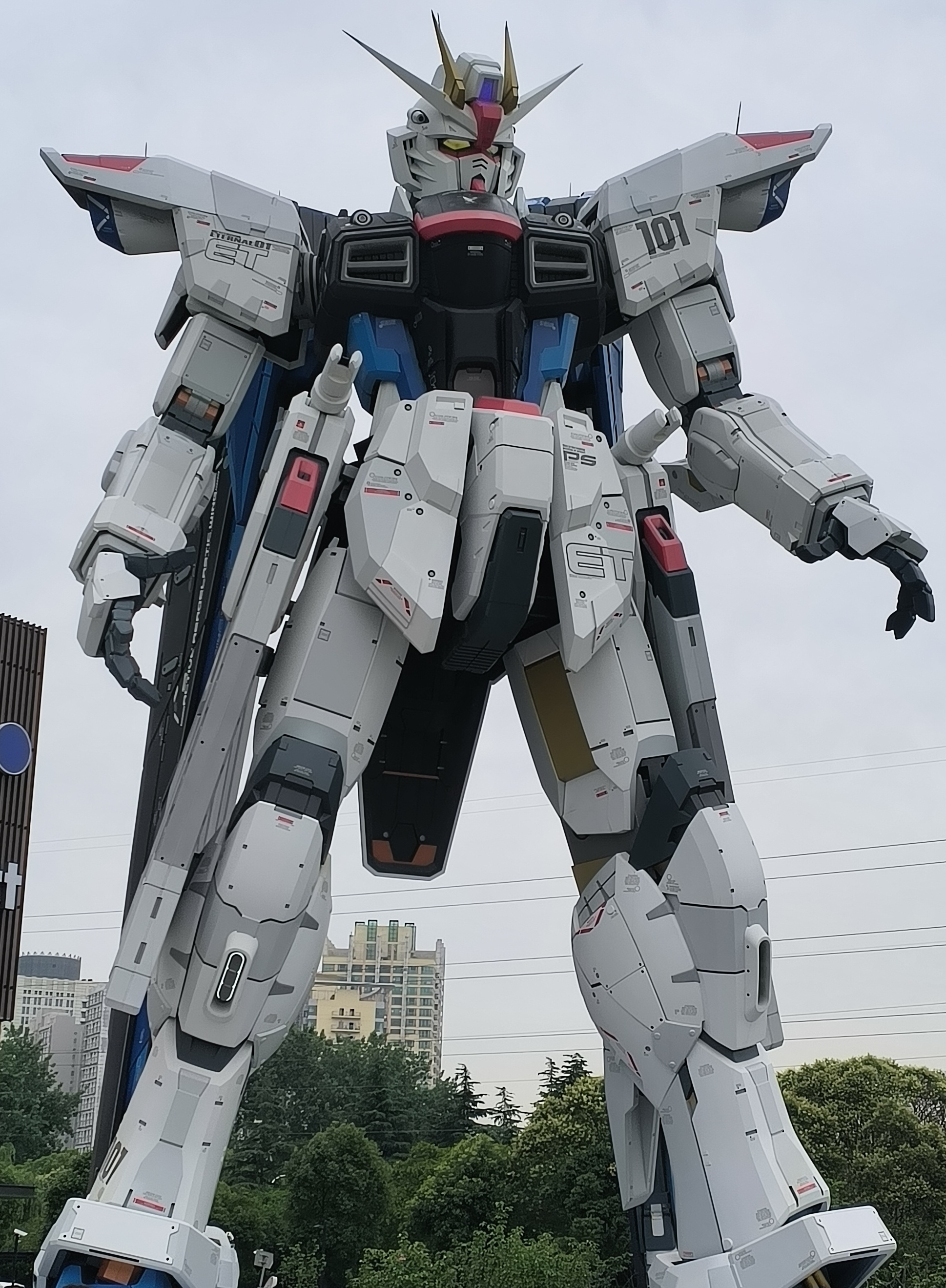
A life-sized statue of the Freedom Gundam from Gundam SEED in Shanghai

On March 23, 2008, a bronze statue of the Gundam was erected at the south entrance of Kami-Igusa Station in Suginami, Tokyo to honor the hometown animation studio Sunrise.

As part of the 30th Anniversary of the Gundam series, the company officially announced a project on March 11, 2009, called Real-G planning to build a 1:1 real size scale Gundam in Japan. It was completed on June 9, 2009, and displayed in a Tokyo park. The 18-meter tall statue was later moved and reconstructed in Shizuoka City, where it stayed from July 2010 to March 2011. This design became the basis for the Real Grade model in 2010 and the Master Grade Ver.3.0 model in 2013 and makes an appearance in Model Suit Gunpla Builders Beginning G. In August it was dismantled and reconstructed in Odaiba, Tokyo on April 19, 2012, alongside a gift shop called "Gundam Front Tokyo". On March 5, it was announced that the life size RX 78-2 Gundam will be replaced by a statue of the RX-0 Unicorn Gundam from Mobile Suit Gundam Unicorn.

A second statue based on the original Gundam was announced in late 2018 as part of the "Gundam Global Challenge" made to receive concepts for an animatronic version. The statue, known as the RX-78F00 Yokohama Gundam, finished construction in 2020 and opened to the public on December 19, 2020, as part of the Gundam Factory Yokohama attraction. The statue was dismantled in 2024. A rebuilt version called the F00/E was featured in the Gundam Next Future Pavilion at Expo 2025 in Osaka. This statue will be in a fixed pose, kneeling and reaching for the sky, and features unique solar paneling on half of its armor.

Other statues include the Freedom Gundam from Mobile Suit Gundam SEED in Shanghai, China in 2021, and a statue of the Nu Gundam from Mobile Suit Gundam: Char's Counterattack sporting a long range funnel weapon (dubbed the RX-93ff) in Fukuoka, Japan in 2022.

=== Physical attractions ===
Gundam the Ride: A Baoa Qu was a theme park attraction from Fuji-Q Highland which ran from 2000 to 2007. Visitors are escorted in a battleship by 2 GM suits during the titular battle. The ride was replaced by Gundam Crisis, where visitors explore a hangar in order to collect data to access the RX-78-2's cockpit. If successful, an exclusive video will be shown inside the cockpit.

The Gundam Front Tokyo store, where the life size RX-78-2 statue once resided, featured a 360 degree panoramic movie theater, a room dedicated to Gundam models throughout the years, concept artwork, and a life-size 1/1 scale bust of the Strike Freedom Gundam from the show Mobile Suit Gundam SEED. The nearby hotel, Grand Nikko Tokyo Daiba (formerly Grand Pacific le Daiba) had a Gundam themed hotel room during this time.

=== Toys and model kits ===
The original line of toys produced by the show's original sponsor Clover, diecast figures with more super robot aesthetics, clashed with the show's themes and audience and was not a success. To capture the teenage and adult demographics, Bandai produced a line of model kits based on the Gundam and other mobile suits, which became immensely popular. The RX-78-2 Gundam has releases in virtually every model line and scale and is often used to commemorate a new model line or an anniversary.

The current Bandai Universal Century models' label copyright classification also uses the head of the Gundam as its icon.

=== Video games ===
A mecha resembling a Gundam was featured in Forza Horizon 6 in a showcase event. The robot malfunctions near the end as an advantage to the player.

== See also ==
- Gundam model
