= List of Mobile Suit Gundam Wing episodes =

North American cover of the first DVD volume, featuring Heero Yuy and the Wing Gundam.

This is a list of episodes from the anime series Mobile Suit Gundam Wing, as well as the OVA Endless Waltz. The series originally aired on TV Asahi in Japan from April 7, 1995, to March 29, 1996, and later aired on Cartoon Network's Toonami programming block in the United States from March 6 to May 11, 2000. The edited version of the Toonami broadcast changed Duo's nickname, "The God of Death" to "The Great Destroyer", necessitating the alteration of two episode titles.

== Mobile Suit Gundam Wing ==
No.	Title	Original release date	English airdate
1	"The Shooting Star She Saw"; Transliteration: "Shōjo ga Mita Ryūsei" (Japanese: 少女が見た流星)	April 7, 1995	March 6, 2000
In the year After Colony 195, after decades of oppression from the United Earth Sphere Alliance and its secret weapons organization, OZ, a group of rebels in the space colonies send down five mobile suits known as "Gundams" to overthrow the militaristic regime. Four of the Gundams successfully make it to Earth, but the fifth (Wing Gundam) is intercepted during its descent by OZ's Lieutenant Zechs Merquise and it crashes into the Pacific Ocean. The Gundam's pilot, who goes by the name Heero Yuy, later washes up on shore and is discovered by Relena Darlian, the daughter of the Alliance's vice foreign minister.
2	"The Gundam Deathscythe"; Transliteration: "Shinigami to Yobareru Gandamu" (Japanese: 死神と呼ばれるG)	April 14, 1995	March 7, 2000
Zechs locates the sunken Wing Gundam in the Pacific Ocean and seeks to claim it for OZ, while Heero attempts to destroy his Gundam with stolen torpedoes in order to prevent OZ from getting their hands on it. However, both of their plans are thwarted by Duo Maxwell, pilot of the Gundam Deathscythe.
3	"Five Gundams Confirmed"; Transliteration: "Gandamu Go Ki Kakunin" (Japanese: ガンダム5機確認)	April 21, 1995	March 8, 2000
Heero is taken to an Alliance hospital, where Major Sally Po cautiously but humanely oversees his recovery and intended questioning; however, before interrogation can occur, Duo promptly helps him escape. The two pilots later return to their pair of recovered Gundams. Meanwhile, Trowa Barton, pilot of the Gundam Heavyarms, and Quatre Raberba Winner, pilot of the Gundam Sandrock, meet in battle. However, when Trowa surrenders after running out of ammunition, Quatre asks that they become friends instead. At the same time, Zechs is introduced to the Tallgeese, the original prototype mobile suit.
4	"The Victoria Nightmare"; Transliteration: "Akumu no Bikutoria" (Japanese: 悪夢のビクトリア)	April 28, 1995	March 9, 2000
Zechs arrives at the Lake Victoria Alliance base to meet with an old friend, Lieutenant Lucrezia Noin, but the base falls under attack from Chang Wufei, pilot of the Shenlong Gundam. Trowa and Quatre part ways after a brief respite from battle, while Heero repairs his Gundam by stealing parts from Duo's and then uses it for a mission to destroy an OZ transportation carrier.
5	"Relena's Secret"; Transliteration: "Rirīna no Himitsu" (Japanese: リリーナの秘密)	May 5, 1995	March 10, 2000
When Relena accompanies her father to the colonies where he is expected at an important meeting, he is severely injured in an explosion set off by OZ's Colonel Lady Une; father and daughter are soon spirited away by Doctor J, the engineer who designed the Wing Gundam and trained Heero. Before Vice Foreign Minister Darlian dies, he reveals to Relena her true identity, and Relena soon learns from Doctor J the extent of Heero's mission and his past.
6	"Party Night"; Transliteration: "Pātī Naito" (Japanese: パーティー·ナイト)	May 12, 1995	March 13, 2000
Relena returns to school in time for a dance, but discovers Heero is going to transfer. After she reveals she knows all about him and his mission, she persuades him into being her escort for the dance. However, the school is attacked by OZ mobile suits sent by Lady Une to kill Relena. Heero uses his Gundam to fight back (believing the enemy suits have come to get him) and ends up saving Relena, much to his own disbelief.
7	"Scenario for Bloodshed"; Transliteration: "Ryūketsu e no Shinario" (Japanese: 流血へのシナリオ)	May 19, 1995	March 14, 2000
The five Gundams all gather at the New Edwards Base in an attempt to kill the higher echelon members of OZ, but they discover too late they have been tricked; Heero has already eliminated the pacifist leaders of the Alliance while Lady Une and the leader of OZ, Colonel Treize Khushrenada, manipulate the only survivor, General Septum, into declaring war on the colonies (before they kill him too). The Alliance is overturned from within and OZ takes over as the new ruling power.
8	"The Treize Assassination"; Transliteration: "Torēzu Ansatsu" (Japanese: トレーズ暗殺)	May 26, 1995	March 15, 2000
Trowa and Wufei go after Treize while Heero, Duo and Quatre attempt to stop the detonation of the New Edwards Base. Wufei and Treize duel in a battle for honor and justice, but Treize decides to spare Wufei when the young man loses and allows him to escape.
9	"Portrait of a Ruined Country"; Transliteration: "Bōkoku no Shōzō" (Japanese: 亡国の肖像)	June 2, 1995	March 16, 2000
Zechs receives the restored Tallgeese mobile suit and returns to the land of his birth, the Sanc Kingdom, in hopes of liberating it from the hands of the Alliance. The connection between Relena and Zechs is finally revealed.
10	"Heero, Distracted by Defeat"; Transliteration: "Hiiro Senkō ni Chiru" (Japanese: ヒイロ閃光に散る)	June 9, 1995	March 17, 2000
OZ plans to transport the new Taurus mobile suits to their base in Siberia. However, Lady Une sets an elaborate trap there to lure and destroy the Gundams. Duo and Quatre arrive to attack the base's ground transportation route (which is revealed to be a decoy), while Heero and Trowa attack the base's aerial route. During the battle, Zechs uses the Tallgeese to duel Heero's Wing Gundam. However, Une interrupts this when she threatens to destroy the space colonies using the missiles of Space Fortress Barge unless the Gundam pilots surrender. Doctor J responds and agrees to surrender, but refuses to hand over the Gundams. Heero follows this implied order by self-detonating his Gundam along with himself, much to the shock of Une, Zechs and the rest of OZ. The remaining Gundams retreat in the confusion.
11	"The Whereabouts of Happiness"; Transliteration: "Kōfuku no Yukue" (Japanese: 幸福の行方)	June 16, 1995	March 20, 2000
With his retreat path from Siberia blocked off by OZ troops, Duo is forced to travel with Quatre and the Maganac Corps to their base in the desert. However, when OZ troops locate the Maganac's base, they distract the enemy while Duo and Quatre escape. At the same time, Zechs gathers the remains of the Wing Gundam and plans to rebuild it, seeking a rematch of his interrupted duel despite not knowing whether or not Heero is still alive. Meanwhile, Relena attempts to take revenge on Lady Une and is nearly killed in the process, but is saved by Noin.
12	"Bewildered Warriors"; Transliteration: "Mayoeru Senshi-tachi" (Japanese: 迷える戦士達)	June 23, 1995	March 21, 2000
Heero awakens at a traveling circus troupe after being unconscious for over a month following his Gundam's self-destruction, having been taken care of by Trowa. Meanwhile, a depressed Wufei encounters former Alliance Major Sally Po, who is now a guerrilla leader. Sally helps Wufei overcome his loss to Treize, causing Wufei to pilot his Gundam once again.
13	"Catherine's Tears"; Transliteration: "Kyasurin no Namida" (Japanese: キャスリンの涙)	June 30, 1995	March 22, 2000
Zechs returns to the Lake Victoria Base, where he meets two of Noin's former students. He agrees to join them in a military offensive, but Zechs is forced to kill them when they reveal their merciless attitudes to war. Meanwhile, Trowa uses his Gundam to attack an OZ base, planning to self-destruct afterwards, but Catherine Bloom, a knife thrower in the circus, forces Trowa to realize the value of his own life.
14	"The Order to Destroy 01"; Transliteration: "Zero Wan Bakuha Shirei" (Japanese: 01爆破指令)	July 7, 1995	March 23, 2000
Heero places his fate in hands of Sylvia Noventa, the granddaughter of Field Marshal Noventa, who Heero killed at New Edwards, while Relena openly defies Duke Dermail, the leader of the Romefeller Foundation, the organization of European nobles with monetary and military support for OZ, which impresses Treize. Meanwhile, Zechs begins to reconstruct the Wing Gundam until suspicious officials from Romefeller order him to destroy its remains. While Zechs complies with the order, it is revealed that he has arranged for a dummy to be destroyed.
15	"To the Battleground Antarctica"; Transliteration: "Kessen no Basho Nankyoku e" (Japanese: 決戦の場所南極へ)	July 14, 1995	March 24, 2000
Noin finds Heero and Trowa and takes them to Antarctica, where Zechs is completing the reconstruction of the Wing Gundam for their intended rematch. When Inspector Acht, who ordered the destruction of the Gundam's remains, arrives to expose Zechs as a traitor, Noin and Trowa destroy the search parties before they reach Zechs.
16	"The Sorrowful Battle"; Transliteration: "Kanashiki Kessen" (Japanese: 悲しき決戦)	July 21, 1995	March 27, 2000
Heero and Trowa arrive at Zechs' Antarctica base, where Heero is reunited with his rebuilt Gundam. However, Heero chooses to use Trowa's Gundam Heavyarms to duel Zechs instead, until Relena's arrival to stop the battle interrupts them again. During this, Noin reveals to Relena that Zechs is her brother, Milliardo Peacecraft. When OZ carriers arrive to arrest him, Zechs decides to surrender to them in order to allow Relena and Noin to escape while Trowa uses the Wing Gundam to pick up Heero and escape as well.
17	"Betrayed by Home, Far Away"; Transliteration: "Uragiri no Tōki Kokyō" (Japanese: 裏切りの遠き故郷)	July 28, 1995	March 28, 2000
Lady Une has become a diplomat of OZ to the colonies and the colonies debate if they should accept OZ's proposal. Duo and Quatre attempt to catch the attention of the other three Gundam pilots, while Une captures the five engineers of the Gundams. The five pilots take off into space after Quatre self-detonates his Gundam.
18	"Tallgeese Destroyed"; Transliteration: "Tōrugisu Hakai" (Japanese: トールギス破壊)	August 4, 1995	March 29, 2000
Zechs fights a heavy battle with the Tallgeese against Alliance mobile suits, while Lady Une forces the Gundam engineers to design and build mobiles suits superior to the Tallgeese and the Gundams under the threat of destroying a shuttle with Quatre inside.
19	"Assault on Barge"; Transliteration: "Baruji Kyōshū" (Japanese: バルジ強襲)	August 11, 1995	March 30, 2000
Duo is easily defeated and captured by OZ due to his Gundam's lack of mobility in space after trying to fight off mobile dolls, computer-controlled mobile suits that require no pilot. Heero sees the battle on television and goes to find and kill Duo, but ends up rescuing him instead. While Lady Une advocates peace, Wufei attacks Space Fortress Barge, but like Duo, his Gundam is unsuited for space combat and he is forced to escape before Une's subordinate, Nichol, finishes him off.
20	"The Lunar Base Infiltration"; Transliteration: "Sennyū, Getsumen Kichi" (Japanese: 潜入、月面基地)	August 18, 1995	March 31, 2000
Sally infiltrates an OZ base in order to destroy the remains of Quatre's Gundam Sandrock, but the Maganac Corps convince her to allow them to take the pieces back to their base and rebuild it. Meanwhile, Duo's Gundam Deathscythe is destroyed in a public viewing of space by possible OZ recruits, one of whom is a familiar face. Heero sneaks into the Lunar Base in order to destroy the two new mobile suits, the Mercurius and the Vayeate, only to be caught by Trowa, now a member of OZ.
21	"Grief Stricken Quatre"; Transliteration: "Kanashimi no Katoru" (Japanese: 悲しみのカトル)	August 25, 1995	April 3, 2000
Heero and Trowa confront Zechs for the first time since their battle in Antarctica and Zechs surrenders willingly. Quatre decides to build the original Gundam that the other five were based on after discovering files in the Winner family computer detailing its designs. Unwilling to compromise to OZ's ideals, Quatre's pacifist father evacuates their colony and sacrifices himself to destroy it before OZ can take advantage of it.
22	"The Fight for Independence"; Transliteration: "Dokuritsu o Meguru Tatakai" (Japanese: 独立を巡る戦い)	August 31, 1995	April 4, 2000
Zechs, now going as Milliardo Peacecraft, meets with Lady Une as an ambassador of the Sanc Kingdom. When Nichol begins acting on his own, Une realizes that she's developed a split personality while trying to execute Treize's dream of the future and imprisons Nichol upon her return to Barge. Meanwhile, Wufei is captured by Chief Engineer Tsuborov of the Romefeller Foundation.
23	"Duo, the God of Death Once Again" "Duo, the Great Destroyer Once Again"; Transliteration: "Shinigami ni Modoru Dyuo" (Japanese: 死神に戻るデュオ)	September 1, 1995	April 5, 2000
Duo and an OZ officer, Hilde Schbeiker, clash in ideals as to what will bring about peace, and she comes to his way of thinking. Duo, after running into the five engineers, allows them to turn him in if he gives them time to finish the construction of both his and Wufei's upgraded Gundams. Back on Earth, Sally manages to locate Heero's Wing Gundam (which he left behind).
24	"The Gundam They Called Zero"; Transliteration: "Zero to Yobata Gandamu" (Japanese: ゼロと呼ばれたG)	September 8, 1995	April 6, 2000
Quatre, now mentally unstable, appears in the newly-constructed Wing Gundam Zero and begins to destroy various colonies one by one. Lady Une sends Heero and Trowa to fight back in the Mercurius and Vayeate, while Tsuborov, finding Une's behavior to be too lenient, stages a coup against her and cuts off the air supply to Wufei, Duo, and the Gundam engineers' cells.
25	"Quatre VS Heero"; Transliteration: "Katoru Bāsasu Hiiro" (Japanese: カトルVSヒイロ)	September 22, 1995	April 7, 2000
Heero fights Quatre in a near vain attempt to demonstrate that the colonies no longer need the Gundams, but when that fails, Trowa forces Quatre to realize his own kindness by paying the ultimate price. Meanwhile, the Romefeller Foundation proposes to replace all OZ mobile suits with their new Virgo mobile dolls and Treize is imprisoned when he refuses to support this. Lady Une, who learns of Tsuborov's treachery, is shot by Tsuborov when she unlocks Duo and Wufei's cell, allowing them to escape with their new, yet incomplete suits: the Gundam Deathscythe Hell and the Altron Gundam.
26	"The Eternal Flame of the Shooting Stars"; Transliteration: "Moetsukinai Ryūsei" (Japanese: 燃えつきない流星)	September 29, 1995	April 10, 2000
Heero and Quatre are saved by members of the Treize Faction, consisting of soldiers still loyal to Treize, and meet the Gundam engineers. They explain that the Wing Gundam Zero uses a system known as ZERO, which increases skill but takes away free will, thus driving the pilot insane. They are captured again by OZ soldier Trant Clark, who forces Heero to test the ZERO System to gather data. However, this causes Heero to go on his own rampage with the Wing Zero inside the Lunar Base. Quatre manages to stop Heero before his insanity destroys them all, and the pair then escape to Earth.
27	"The Locus of Victory and Defeat"; Transliteration: "Shōri to Haiboku no Kiseki" (Japanese: 勝利と敗北の軌跡)	October 6, 1995	April 11, 2000
A recap episode from the point of view of Relena and Heero
28	"Passing Destinies"; Transliteration: "Surechigau Unmei" (Japanese: すれ違う運命)	October 13, 1995	April 12, 2000
A recap episode from the point of view of Treize and Lady Une. At the conclusion of the episode, Treize's new creation is partly revealed: the Gundam Epyon.
29	"The Heroine of the Battlefield"; Transliteration: "Senjō no Hiroin" (Japanese: 戦場のヒロイン)	October 20, 1995	April 13, 2000
Sally is captured by OZ, but is able to hide Heero's Wing Gundam until Noin arrives and helps her recover it. Relena, now leader of the Sanc Kingdom, clashes ideals with Dorothy Catalonia, a new transfer student and granddaughter of Duke Dermail, who desires the thrill of war. Heero and Quatre, now back on Earth, escape from an OZ carrier.
30	"The Reunion with Relena"; Transliteration: "Rirīna to no Saikai" (Japanese: リリーナとの再会)	October 27, 1995	April 14, 2000
Heero fights as a mercenary for the Treize Faction, while Quatre decides that after the battle he will go to the Sanc Kingdom. Noin arrives with the Wing Gundam's buster rifle to help even the odds and later brings the two pilots to the Sanc Kingdom, where Relena is waiting.
31	"The Glass Kingdom"; Transliteration: "Garasu no Ōkoku (Sanku Kingudomu)" (Japanese: ガラスの王国)	November 3, 1995	April 17, 2000
While Heero intends to take his Gundam back and leave, Quatre convinces him to stay in the Sanc Kingdom to defend Relena. Later, when OZ attacks a Treize Faction unit hiding in the Sanc Kingdom as an excuse to invade the pacifist nation, Heero leads a counterattack with the Wing Gundam and (once again) saves Relena's life in the process. Although she advocates pacifism, Relena allows Heero and Noin to form a small defense force of mobile suits to defend the country.
32	"The God of Death Meets Zero" "The Great Destroyer Meets Zero"; Transliteration: "Shinigami to Zero no Taiketsu" (Japanese: 死神とゼロの対決)	November 17, 1995	April 18, 2000
While working on salvaging the parts to complete his upgraded Gundam, Duo is captured and forced by Trant to test the ZERO System for OZ, but is driven nearly insane. He is rescued by Hilde as Trant attempts to master control of the Wing Zero. However, the ZERO System also drives Trant insane and he dies as a result of it.
33	"The Lonely Battlefield"; Transliteration: "Kodoku na Senjō" (Japanese: 孤独な戦場)	November 24, 1995	April 19, 2000
Relena meets with Duke Dermail, who declares the Sanc Kingdom hypocritical as Zechs continues to fight Romefeller in space. Meanwhile, when Treize's base in Luxembourg is under attack from an army of Virgos, Heero arrives with his Gundam to assist the Treize Faction. However, he soon finds himself overwhelmed by the continuous waves of mobile dolls.
34	"And Its Name is Epyon"; Transliteration: "Sono Na wa Epion" (Japanese: その名はエピオン)	December 1, 1995	April 20, 2000
Heero enters Treize's Luxembourg mansion. There, a philosophical Treize presents Heero with the Gundam Epyon, which is equipped with the ZERO System just like the Wing Zero. Meanwhile, OZ's attempt to destroy the Wing Zero is intercepted by Zechs, who sacrifices the Tallgeese as a distraction in order to acquire the Gundam.
35	"The Return of Wufei"; Transliteration: "Ūfei Futatabi" (Japanese: ウーフェイ再び)	December 8, 1995	April 21, 2000
Wufei returns to his home colony with his upgraded Gundam, but is forced to witness its destruction when they believe it is the only path to take against OZ. Zechs offers to become his ally and the use of the Wing Zero, but after being driven insane by the ZERO System, Wufei finds that Zechs lacks the justice to properly bring about peace. Quatre goes to the desert to retrieve his newly-rebuilt Gundam from the Maganac Corps. Meanwhile, Duke Dermail authorizes Tsuberov to begin construction of the fortress cannon Libra in hopes of using it as a symbol to unify the soldiers.
36	"Sanc Kingdom's Collapse"; Transliteration: "Ōkoku (Sanku Kingudamu) Hōkai" (Japanese: 王国 (サンクキングダム) 崩壊)	December 15, 1995	April 24, 2000
Duo finds Trowa alive and working at the circus, but realizes that Trowa has lost his memory and is soon driven away by Catherine. Relena is forced to dissolve the Sanc Kingdom in order to save the lives of the people in the country and agrees to become a prisoner of OZ, though Dermail realizes that she might be the symbol needed to unify OZ which Romefeller presently lacks. Noin and Quatre leave for space while Heero loses control of the Epyon and continues to destroy the mobile dolls.
37	"Zero VS Epyon"; Transliteration: "Zero Bāsasu Epion" (Japanese: ゼロVSエピオン)	December 22, 1995	April 25, 2000
Zechs arrives in the Sanc Kingdom too late and is devastated - he (piloting the Wing Zero) ends up fighting Heero (piloting the Epyon), but the battle ends in another draw and they exchange Gundams before parting ways again. Relena reluctantly takes Duke Dermail's offer to become the new representative of Romefeller. Meanwhile, the Lunar Base and the uncompleted Libra are hijacked by the White Fang revolutionary army as they begin their quest to take back space from Romefeller, and Tsuborov is killed during Wufei's attack on the Lunar Base.
38	"The Birth of Queen Relena"; Transliteration: "Kuīn Rirīna Tanjō" (Japanese: 女王 (クイーン) リリーナ誕生)	January 12, 1996	April 26, 2000
Informed by Duo, Quatre approaches Trowa and asks for forgiveness. As Quatre and Noin fight the new faction, White Fang, Trowa, despite the fact he still remembers nothing, agrees to fight with them in hopes of recovering his memory. Queen Relena eliminates all international boundaries and founds the World Nation in hopes of bringing peace.
39	"Trowa's Return to the Battlefield"; Transliteration: "Torowa Senjō e Kaeru" (Japanese: トロワ戦場へ帰る)	January 19, 1996	April 27, 2000
Zechs accepts an offer from Quinze to become the leader of White Fang. While Dermail intends to continue using Relena as a figurehead, Dorothy and Marquis Weiridge conspire with other members of Romefeller to make Relena a queen in power as well as name. Meanwhile, White Fang's repeated advances convince Duo to leave Hilde's colony for her own protection. Trowa, Quatre, and Noin are mistaken as White Fang members by an OZ unit in the ruins of a nearby colony; after turning the tide of the resultant battle, Duo agrees to join the group.
40	"A New Leader"; Transliteration: "Arata naru Shidōsha" (Japanese: 新たなる指導者)	January 26, 1996	April 28, 2000
Howard, an ally to both Duo and Zechs, agrees to team up with all the Gundam pilots and offers his ship, the Peacemillion, as a base. Relena announces that the Romefeller Foundation must disarm and calls for peaceful coexistence between Earth and colonies. Heero, in an attempt to kill her to end the false peace, spares her when he and Relena see the response Romefeller has given her is positive. Dermail is killed trying to regain power in space while White Fang's new leader, Milliardo Peacecraft, declares war on Earth.
41	"Crossfire at Barge"; Transliteration: "Baruji Kōbōsen" (Japanese: バルジ攻防戦)	February 2, 1996	May 1, 2000
Treize dismisses Relena from her position because he reasons, now that she has laid the foundation for peace, he will provide the military might required to bring it to fruition. As she and Dorothy head for space separately, so do Heero and Sally, taking along the Wing Zero and Trowa's Gundam Heavyarms (which Sally has recovered). When Duo, Trowa, Quatre, and Noin intervene in the White Fang's attack on Barge in hopes of finding out why Zechs has declared war against Earth, he makes his intentions clear by singlehandedly destroying Barge with the Epyon's beam sword.
42	"Battleship Libra"; Transliteration: "Rībura Hasshin" (Japanese: リーブラ発進)	February 9, 1996	May 2, 2000
Treize visits a comatose Lady Une and reveals that he must bring about the peace because the burden would be too great for Relena. Wufei attempts to fight against White Fang on his own, but his Gundam runs out of power. While he refuses help from Heero and Sally, Heero lends him the Wing Zero. During the subsequent battle, the ZERO System convinces Wufei to join forces with the other Gundam pilots in order to defeat both Zechs and Treize. Relena continues towards Libra, Zechs' new base of operations which has now been completed.
43	"Target: Earth"; Transliteration: "Chijō o Utsu Ōrora" (Japanese: 地上を撃つ巨光 (オーロラ))	February 16, 1996	May 3, 2000
The five Gundam pilots are reunited on board Peacemillion. Trowa borrows the Wing Zero in order to free colonists of C421 (after seeing Catherine amongst them) from a rogue OZ unit (that is trying to blackmail the White Fang to return Libra to them), but nearly destroys them (once again because of the ZERO System) until Quatre stops him and recovers Trowa's memory in the process. Relena attempts to reason with Zechs as her shuttle approaches Libra, but he orders the firing of Libra's cannon on Earth as a direct challenge to Treize.
44	"Go Forth, Gundam Team"; Transliteration: "Shutsugeki Jī Chīmu" (Japanese: 出撃Gチーム)	February 23, 1996	May 4, 2000
Relena, now on board Libra, attempts to reason with Zechs, but is imprisoned instead. After Heero installs the ZERO System in Quatre's Gundam Sandrock, Zechs adapts the system so Dorothy can control mobile dolls. Dorothy has the upper hand against the pilots until Quatre uses the ZERO System and turns the tide.
45	"Signs of the Final Battle"; Transliteration: "Kessen no Yokan" (Japanese: 決戦の予感)	March 1, 1996	May 5, 2000
Hilde sneaks on board Libra to steal the blueprints and runs into Relena. When she escapes to Peacemillion, she is nearly killed until Duo arrives to fight against the rebuilt Mercrius and Vayeate, now mobile dolls programmed with Heero and Trowa's combat data. Duo reveals to Heero (from Hilde) that Relena is on Libra.
46	"Milliardo's Decision"; Transliteration: "Miriarudo no Ketsudan" (Japanese: ミリアルドの決断)	March 8, 1996	May 8, 2000
Heero sneaks on board Libra to rescue Relena and they both go to confront Zechs, but they fail to convince him to end the war. Meanwhile, Treize, piloting the new Tallgeese II mobile suit, leads the World Nation forces into battle in space and offers to duel Zechs one-on-one to decide the fate of the world, but Zechs fires Libra's cannon as his refusal. Treize is saved thanks to the timely arrival of Lady Une, piloting the Wing Gundam (which Heero left behind in Luxembourg), and he orders his forces to destroy Libra.
47	"Collision in Space"; Transliteration: "Gekitotsu suru Uchū" (Japanese: 激突する宇宙)	March 15, 1996	May 9, 2000
The Gundam pilots on board Peacemillion refuse to join Treize, but still believe they must stop Libra and head off in that direction. Sally and Howard decide the only way to stop Libra is to evacuate Peacemillion and ram it into Libra's main cannon. Noin decides she would rather remain by Zechs' side than fight him.
48	"Takeoff into Confusion"; Transliteration: "Konmei e no Shutsugeki" (Japanese: 混迷への出撃)	March 22, 1996	May 10, 2000
Wufei fights mobile dolls and gets a rematch with Treize, questioning if Treize understands justice and the consequences of his actions. However, as Treize reveals that he does understand, he charges Wufei and forces him to kill Treize in self-defense (much to Wufei's surprise and anger). Duo finds the Gundam engineers while Dorothy reveals her own tragedies as she attempts to prove to Quatre in a fencing duel on Libra that war is the only way peace will be understood. Heero and Relena return to Peacemillion, where Heero asks Relena to believe in him before he leaves with the Wing Zero to face Zechs one last time.
49	"The Final Victor"; Transliteration: "Saigo no Shōrisha" (Japanese: 最後の勝利者)	March 29, 1996	May 11, 2000
Heero and Zechs begin their final duel against each other while Duo sets off with the Gundam engineers, who intend to rewire Peacemillion so it will destroy itself before it and Libra crash on Earth. This objective is eventually accomplished, though it kills the engineers along with Quinze. Lady Une announces the surrender of the World Nation to the moderate colony leaders in the wake of Treize's death, who agree with her proposal that the war must end. Heero and Zechs continue fighting until they agree that it now has no meaning. After Zechs seemingly sacrifices himself to destroy Libra, Heero uses the Wing Zero's twin buster rifle to destroy the remaining fragment of the station that has entered the atmosphere. Following the end of the war, Earth and the colonies unite together to form the Earth Sphere Unified Nation. Relena, having returned to her Darlian identity, becomes the new vice foreign minister in hopes of maintaining the peace.

== Gundam Wing: Operation Meteor ==
Though set immediately after the end of Gundam Wing, the original video animation (OVA) features seven clips from each Gundam pilot's perspective during the series. Each segment is introduced and concluded with scenes depicting what has happened to the five pilots in the direct aftermath of the final battle.

No.	Title	Original release date
1	"Operation Meteor I: Odd Numbers"	April 25, 1996
Featuring the "odd-numbered" Gundam pilots (Heero, Trowa and Wufei) reflecting on the events of the first half of the series.
2	"Operation Meteor I: Even Numbers"	April 25, 1996
Featuring the "even-numbered" Gundam pilots (Duo and Quatre) reflecting on the events of the first half of the series.
3	"Operation Meteor II: Odd Numbers II"	October 25, 1996
Featuring odd-numbered pilots Heero, Trowa and Wufei reflecting on the second half of the series.
4	"Operation Meteor II: Even Numbers II"	October 25, 1996
Featuring the even-numbered pilots Duo and Quatre reflecting on the second half of the series.

== Gundam Wing: Endless Waltz ==
No.	Title	Original release date	English airdate
OVA–01	"Silent Orbit"; Transliteration: "Shizuka naru Kidou (Sairento Obito)" (Japanese: 静かなる軌道(サイレント·オービット))	January 25, 1997	November 10, 2000
In After Colony 196, one year after the end of the war, the Earth and the colonies are at peace, and the Gundam pilots (with the exception of Wufei) send their Gundams to the Sun to be destroyed. On Christmas Eve, however, the Barton Foundation kidnaps Relena and declares war on Earth, using the late Treize's alleged daughter, Mariemaia, as a figurehead. Their plan is to conduct Operation Meteor as it originally was planned. The Gundam pilots have to intervene, but Wufei is revealed to have joined forces with the Mariemaia Army. Additional information concerning the backgrounds of the Gundam pilots is revealed.
OVA–02	"Operation Meteor"; Transliteration: "Sugi Kyo ri shi Ryuusei (Opareshiyon Meteo)" (Japanese: 過ぎ去りし流星(オペレーション·メテオ))	April 25, 1997	November 10, 2000
Quatre decides to bring back the Gundams, while Heero, Duo and Trowa try to stop the Mariemaia Army. Meanwhile, the believed-dead Zechs returns and attacks the Mariemaia Army's asteroid base with the new Tallgeese III mobile suit. However, he is forced to stop when Dekim Barton threatens to drop a colony on Earth. No one is able to prevent the Mariemaia Army from seizing control of Earth using their new Serpent mobile suits. After Quatre succeeds in preventing the Gundams from being destroyed, Heero requests that Quatre send the Wing Zero to a specified point in space where Heero will pick it up himself.
OVA–3	"Return to Forever"; Transliteration: "Eien no Kaiki (Ritan tu Foeba)" (Japanese: 永遠の回帰(リターン·トゥ·フォーエバー))	July 25, 1997	November 10, 2000
Heero rendezvous with the Wing Zero and flies to Earth to save Relena, but is intercepted by Wufei's Altron Gundam and forced to fight him. Duo, Trowa and Quatre get their Gundams back and help Zechs and Noin in their attack on the Mariemaia Army's captured fortress in Brussels. Heero eventually arrives, having convinced Wufei that they must bring an end to the conflict, and uses the Wing Zero's twin buster rifle to destroy the fortress' underground bunker shields. When the people of Earth arrive to declare their own desires for peace, Relena and Lady Une are able to convince Mariemaia that she is mistaken. Dekim tries to kill Relena, but is instead killed by one of his own soldiers out of respect for Treize. Following Mariemaia's surrender and the return of peace between Earth and the colonies, the last of the mobile suits (including the Gundams) are destroyed. The Gundam pilots are at last able to bring closure to their lives as soldiers.
Compilation–Movie	"Gundam Wing: Endless Waltz Special Edition"; Transliteration: "Shin Kidō Senki Gandamu Uingu: Endoresu Warutsu tokubetsuhen" (Japanese: 新機動戦記ガンダムW Endless Waltz 特別篇)	August 1, 1998	August 30, 2002
A compilation of all three Endless Waltz episodes. It includes additional scenes and an altered musical score.
