= Mobile Suit Gundam Wing: Episode Zero =

Manga miniseries

- New Mobile Report Gundam W: Episode Zero
- Cover of Episode Zero

新機動戦記ガンダムW EPISODE ZERO (Shin Kidō Senki Gundam Wing Episode Zero)
- Genre: Mecha, Military science fiction
- Created by: Hajime Yatate; Yoshiyuki Tomino
- Manga
- Written by: Katsuyuki Sumisawa
- Illustrated by: Akira Kanbe
- Published by: Gakken
- English publisher: NA: Viz Media
- Magazine: Anime V
- Published: 1997
- Volumes: 1

New Mobile Report Gundam Wing: Episode Zero (新機動戦記ガンダムW EPISODE ZERO, Shin Kidō Senki Gundam W Episode Zero), released in the United States as Mobile Suit Gundam Wing: Episode Zero, is a manga miniseries based on the anime series Mobile Suit Gundam Wing, featuring stories set mostly before the events of that tale. Unlike other Gundam Wing manga, which are not necessarily considered as being in continuity, Episode Zero has the distinction of being written by Katsuyuki Sumizawa, who was also the writer of the anime series, and thus carries a higher level of credibility. Akira Kanbe handled the art duties for this project.

Episode Zero can technically be considered canon, since it was originally going to be included in the Gundam Wing television series. Director Masashi Ikeda specifically asked Sumizawa to pen the main characters' backstories, and they were to be included in the series following episode 27 ("The Locus Of Victory And Defeat"). However, due to production scheduling being the "worst ever" (in Sumizawa's own words) and his withdrawing as a scenery director, Episode Zero's tale kept being delayed and pushed back. Though it was later intended to play some role in episode 31 ("The Glass Kingdom"), the problems persisted, and the Episode Zero story ended up being left out of the anime series entirely.

== Background information ==
Episode Zero reveals a generous amount of information regarding what led the five protagonists of the series to become Gundam pilots, and what occurrences shaped some of the traits they are best known for. It also features notable information on certain other key characters and events that composed the Gundam Wing story.

One of the most prominent tales is told within Issues 2 and 3, in which it's discovered that a younger Heero once fought alongside Odin Lowe—the man who, years earlier, was responsible for the assassination of the colonial leader Heero Yuy.

A battlefield assault by Heero later on in the tale puts Treize in the hospital, where he would be tended to by Leia Barton—the future mother of his child (who would become the main antagonist of the Endless Waltz story that takes place years later).

The stories involving Trowa and Wufei are, unexpectedly enough, romantic tragedies, as each meet young women who will have significant impacts on their lives. Trowa's story also implies that Catherine Bloom, the circus performer he meets during the series, is in fact his long-lost older sister, who he was separated from as an infant during an attack by the Alliance which presumably killed their parents, and that Trowa's real name is actually Triton Bloom.

The focus is more on origin in the cases of Duo and Quatre. "Duo Maxwell" is revealed to not be Duo's given name; instead, "Duo" was taken by the young orphan in memory of a childhood friend named Solo, who died from a severe illness, and "Maxwell" was taken afterwards from a kind priest named Father Maxwell, who, along with a nun named Sister Helen, ran an orphanage out of the Maxwell Church. Sister Helen and Father Maxwell played a large role in the childhood of Duo, acting in parental roles until they (and the entire orphanage) were made casualties of an Alliance attack on rebels within the church (which was later known as the Maxwell Church Massacre), despite young Duo's best efforts to keep his new family alive.

Quatre, in contrast, has possibly the least tragic past out of all the pilots. Contrary to what he believes, he is not, in fact, the product of test-tube reproduction (his 29 elder sisters, however, are). His mother, Katherine, died in childbirth due to complications from living in space affecting the body's ability to give birth safely. As he refers to himself as a test-tube child in the series, it can be assumed his father and sisters never told him about his mother.

The histories of the two surviving Peacecraft family members, Relena and Zechs Merquise, are unveiled as well. As the Sanq Kingdom fell, only two members of the royal family survived: the children, Zechs and Relena. Relena was adopted by the Darlian family and raised as their own. The story implies that Relena and Zechs met prior to the series, which is how Zechs knew that his little sister was still alive (although she did not know him, having not been told about her true identity until the series). Also appearing in the story is a young boy who briefly attends Relena's school (apparently on an undercover mission) and greatly resembles Heero.

The manga also features undetailed cameos from notable characters in the series, such as Lucrezia Noin (in Heero's story) and Sally Po (in Wufei's story).

Toward the end, the five heroes gather for a brief new mission that is set after Endless Waltz, an event which ends in a cliffhanger but with a promising connotation. The work concludes with an affectionate parting message from writer Sumizawa himself to the fans of Gundam Wing.
