= Sayuri Yamauchi =

Japanese voice actress (1956–2012)

- Born: May 28, 1956; Tokyo, Japan
- Died: March 6, 2012 (aged 55); Tokyo, Japan
- Other name: Sayuri (紗ゆり)
- Occupation: Voice actress
- Notable credit(s): Lady Une in Mobile Suit Gundam Wing "Twilight" Suzuka in Outlaw Star; Nanako Ohara in Crayon Shin-chan

Sayuri Yamauchi (山内 小百合, Yamauchi Sayuri; May 28, 1956 – March 6, 2012), also known by the stage name Sayuri (紗ゆり), was a Japanese voice actress. Yamauchi voiced Itchy and Maude Flanders on the Japanese dub of The Simpsons. She was formerly affiliated with Kyu Production and affiliated with Aigumi at the time of her death. Yamauchi died of cancer on March 6, 2012, at the age of 55.

== Filmography ==
=== Anime ===
- The Big O: Vera Ronstadt
- The Brave Fighter of Legend Da-Garn: Hikaru Kosaka
- City Hunter: The Secret Service: Dress Store Clerk
- City Hunter: The Motion Picture: Performer #2
- Crayon Shin-chan: Nanako Ohara, Lulu Lu Lulu
- Cyborg 009: 0012
- Detective Conan: Woman (ep. 5)
- Fullmetal Alchemist: Brotherhood: Satella
- The King of Braves GaoGaiGar: Primada, Ikumi Kaidou, Ai Amami
- Saint of Braves Baan Gaan: Astral
- Mobile Suit Gundam Wing and Gundam Wing: Endless Waltz: Lady Une
- Outlaw Star: "Twilight" Suzuka
- Samurai Champloo: Osuzu
- Shaman King: Maya
- Shamanic Princess: Tiara

=== Video games ===
- Baten Kaitos Origins: Gena
- Dragon Force II: Bjorn, Medea
- Robot Alchemic Drive: Tomoe Kawasaki
- Super Robot Wars Alpha 2: Ai Anami, Primarda
- Super Robot Wars Alpha 3: Ikumi Kaidou, Palus Abel
- Super Robot Wars T: Ikumi Kaidoh
- Xenoblade Chronicles: Lorithia

=== Dubbing ===
==== Live-action ====
- A.I. Artificial Intelligence: Monica Swinton (Frances O'Connor)
- Erin Brockovich: Donna Jensen (Marg Helgenberger)
- The Long Kiss Goodnight: Trin (Melina Kanakaredes)
- Love, Honour and Obey: Sadie (Sadie Frost)
- The Matrix: Switch (Belinda McClory)
- Mission: Impossible: Claire Phelps (Emmanuelle Béart)
- Pecker: Precinct Captain (Mink Stole)
- The Sea Inside: Rosa (Lola Dueñas)
- Suspiria (1998 DVD edition): Miss Tanner (Alida Valli)
- Twin Peaks: Audrey Horne (Sherilyn Fenn)

==== Animation ====
- The Simpsons: Itchy; Maude Flanders
