= List of Mobile Suit Gundam Wing characters =

The following list contains characters from the Japanese anime television series Mobile Suit Gundam Wing and subsequent spin-offs, and codes that indicate which series and manga the characters appear in:

- EZ – New Mobile Report Gundam Wing: Episode Zero
- W – New Mobile Report Gundam Wing
- GU – New Mobile Report Gundam Wing Dual Story: G-Unit
- TI – New Mobile Report Gundam Wing: Tiel's Impulse
- SY – New Mobile Report Gundam Wing Sidestory: A Scythe in My Right Hand, You in My Left
- BT – New Mobile Report Gundam Wing: Blind Target
- BP – New Report Gundam Wing: Battlefield of Pacifists
- EW – New Mobile Report Gundam Wing: Endless Waltz
- FT – New Mobile Report Gundam Wing: Frozen Teardrop

== Gundam pilots and allies ==
The Gundam pilots, from left: Quatre, Trowa, Heero, Duo and Wufei.

Heero Yuy (ヒイロ・ユイ, Hiiro Yui) [EZ, W, BT, BP, EW, FT]

Ethnicity: Japanese
The protagonist of Mobile Suit Gundam Wing, and the pilot of the XXXG-01W Wing Gundam and (later) the XXXG-00W0 Wing Gundam Zero. During the series, very little of his past is revealed, although the prequel manga Episode Zero revealed that he was once a nameless protégé of the assassin Odin Lowe until the assassin's death during a failed mission. Shortly thereafter, the nameless boy was taken in by Doctor J and trained as a Gundam pilot. At the onset of Operation Meteor, Doctor J gave him the code name "Heero Yuy" after the martyred leader of the space colonies whom Odin assassinated years prior. Although Heero often acts very cold, reckless, emotionless, and anti-social, he sympathizes with the oppressed colony citizens and formed strong bonds with his fellow Gundam pilots, Relena, and other allies over time. Though his true feelings for Relena are never fully explained in the series, he has vowed to protect her from all danger (despite threatening to kill her when she initially learned about his mission). At the end of the sequel novel series Frozen Teardrop, Heero asks Relena to marry him, and she accepts his proposal. In the epilogue, which takes place 5 months after the events of the final chapter, Heero is now living a happy and peaceful life with Relena on Mars, with the two discussing their plans for marriage and starting a family of their own. Heero Yuy was voiced by Hikaru Midorikawa in the Japanese version and Mark Hildreth in the English dub.
Duo Maxwell (デュオ・マックスウェル, Dyuo Makkusuweru) [EZ, W, SY, BT, BP, EW, FT]
Ethnicity: American
The pilot of the XXXG-01D Gundam Deathscythe and the XXXG-01D2 Gundam Deathscythe Hell. He is cheerful, amicable, and goofy, but this is a front to cover up his tragic past. In "Episode Zero", it was revealed that he chose his name to commemorate a boy he admired named Solo; they had been part of a street gang together. Solo had told the young Duo that they would always be together, but Solo later died from a disease that swept the colony. Duo took his last name from the Maxwell Church, a home for war orphans run by Father Maxwell and Sister Helen, a Catholic priest and nun. He lived in the church until it was destroyed during an Alliance attack, in what became known as "the Maxwell Church Massacre". Duo was the only survivor because he was not there during the attack; he had gone to steal a mobile suit from a nearby military base to drive out a group of Colony rebels hiding in the church. Mementos of Duo's lost loved ones are his distinctive 3-foot braid (a reminder of Sister Helen, who carefully braided his long hair as a child) and the priest's clothes that he usually wears. He refers to himself as Shinigami (the "God of Death" in the original Japanese version or the "Great Destroyer" in the edited English dub), because anyone who gets close to him eventually dies. Duo later became a member of the Sweeper Group, an engineer, a hacker of great skill, and finally, a Gundam pilot after meeting Professor G. Duo Maxwell was given voice by Toshihiko Seki in the Japanese version and by Scott McNeil in the English dub.
Trowa Barton (トロワ・バートン, Torowa Bāton) [EZ, W, BT, BP, EW]
Ethnicity: Slav
The pilot of the XXXG-01H Gundam Heavyarms; he is also known as "Nanashi" (名なし; "No-Name"). Trowa is a stoic young man who has spent almost his entire life on the battlefield. Reserved by nature, he can be seen to be as emotionless as Heero but is a warm-hearted person who is very protective of those he cares about. Nanashi took the name "Trowa Barton" after the real one (the son of Dekim Barton) was shot and killed by the assistant of Doktor S, the creator of Gundam Heavyarms when they were unwilling to proceed with Operation Meteor. Besides being a Gundam pilot, Trowa is also an accomplished acrobat, which serves him well in his cover identity as a clown in a traveling circus. Trowa is assumed to be Triton Bloom, Catherine Bloom's long-lost brother that was believed to have died years ago as an infant. There is only a little evidence of this: in the Episode Zero manga, the baby shown being thrown from the cart's wreckage in the bombing that killed Catherine's family has Trowa's trademark bangs, and according to official sources, Trowa has "a burn scar on his back that he didn't get in battle", but if the names of the pilots do relate to numbers, it would seem more likely that this was true. Trowa Barton was given voice by Shigeru Nakahara in the Japanese version and Kirby Morrow in English.
Quatre Raberba Winner (カトル・ラバーバ・ウィナー, Katoru Rabāba Winā) [EZ, W, BT, BP, EW]
Ethnicity: Arab
The pilot of the XXXG-01SR Gundam Sandrock, well as the heir to a major space mining company known as the Winner Corporation. Quatre is a very kind young man who loves animals and is the greatest believer in the pacifism of the five Gundam pilots. He has twenty-nine older sisters that were all test-tube babies (according to the Episode Zero manga) the numerous problems experienced in natural pregnancy during the colonists' first arrival in space created the need for test-tube babies until a cure was developed. Everyone was then able to produce children naturally sans the Winner family due to their living in space since the colonies' creation. Quatre's mother desperately wanted to bear at least one child naturally and so she did though it cost her life. Quatre was never informed that he was the only child who was born naturally, and thus had a cold, angry demeanor for a long time (due to feeling that he and his sisters were just pawns created by his father to benefit the Corporation and that they could all be replaced at any time). Quatre is a natural leader as he leads a group of Middle Eastern fighters known as the Maganac Cor (who are all test-tube babies themselves). The Maganacs have accepted Quatre as their leader as (in Episode Zero) Quatre saved their leader Rashid's life when Quatre flushed out a traitor within the Maganac ranks. Quatre was then given his goggles by Rashid as a symbol of the leader of the Maganacs. The Maganacs also taught Quatre to have pride in himself, no matter where he came from, and the young man's kind, gentle nature arose from that understanding. Despite being a pacifist, Quatre sees the Gundams as a necessary evil, which has strained his relationship with his father, who followed the path of absolute pacifism before his death. Toward the end of the series, Heero turns leadership of the Gundam Team over to Quatre. Although Newtypes are not referenced in the Gundam Wing universe, Quatre seems to sense the "Heart of Space" (or "Soul of Outer Space") like Amuro Ray was able to. Quatre Winner was given voice by Ai Orikasa in the Japanese version and Brad Swaile (Amuro Ray's voice actor in Mobile Suit Gundam) in the English dub.
Chang Wufei (張 五飛, Chan Ūfei; Hanyu Pinyin: Zhāng Wǔfēi) [EZ, W, BT, BP, EW, FT]
Ethnicity: Han Chinese
The pilot of the XXXG-01S Shenlong Gundam and the XXXG-01S2 Altron Gundam, he constantly refers to both incarnations as the deity "Nataku" after whom his late wife Meilan modeled herself after. Wufei is a fierce warrior descended from a long, proud line of Chinese warriors and thus despises weakness in character and body. As evidenced in Episode Zero, when he was younger he was calmer and much more cerebral, but his unwillingness to fight resulted in the death of his wife Meilan, a strong girl who took the responsibility of protecting the colony (as well as Shenlong Gundam) onto herself and was killed in battle. Wufei then chose to carry out her path of justice in honor of her sacrifice. Wufei looks down on those who he deems weak and cowardly. Although Wufei preferred to fight alone, he eventually realized that he needed to team up with the other Gundam pilots to accomplish his goals. Chang Wufei was given voice by Ryuzou Ishino in the Japanese version and Ted Cole in the English dub.
Doctor J (ドクターJ, Dokutā Jei) [EZ, W, EW]
His full name is Jack Null, he is an engineer and beam weapon expert who played a role in developing the Mobile Suits of the AC era. His distinguishing features include mechanical-looking goggles, a cybernetic right arm (the fingers of which he has an aggravating tendency to clack together), and metal braces on his lower legs. While J and his colleagues developed the OZ-00MS Tallgeese prototype mobile suit for the Alliance, they accepted Dekim Barton's request to construct the Gundams in retaliation for their colonies being oppressed. J would develop Wing Gundam based on his earlier mobile suit design known as the Wyvern. After taking the youth he appropriately named "Heero Yui" into his care, J shared his colleagues disagreed with Operation Meteor and encouraged Heero to deviate from Dekim's plan. J also saves Relena from OZ's hit squad and tells her about Heero's past, later presumed dead along with the other scientists when they re-activated Peacemillion's engines to propel Libra away from Earth. Doctor J was given voice by Minoru Inaba in Japanese and Dave Ward in English.
Professor G (プロフェッサーG, Purofessā Jī) [EZ, W, EW]
The engineer and creator of the Gundam Deathscythe, as well as co-creator of the spaceship Peacemillion, and Duo Maxwell's mentor. He is distinguished by his long nose, mushroom-shaped hair, and a long scar on his cheek. Sardonic and rather eccentric, he tends to describe Deathscythe as "the ultimate work of art" (perhaps due to his specialization in stealth systems) and claims that the other Gundams are "a fluke". When Duo refused to go along with Dekim Barton's original Operation Meteor, G told him to "steal" Deathscythe and fight the Alliance on his terms. G was the first to be captured by Lady Une. A member of the Sweeper Group, he was impressed by Duo cracking his security codes and offered to train him as a Gundam pilot. G was presumed dead along with his fellow scientists in the re-activation of Peacemillion's engines.
Doktor S (ドクトルS, Dokutoru Esu) [EW, W, EW]
The engineer and creator of the Gundam Heavyarms, he is distinguished by his prosthetic nose and spiked gray hair. His specialty is ballistic weaponry. S was opposed to Operation Meteor but the original Trowa Barton (Heavyarms' assigned pilot) was prepared to rat him out to his father Dekim. The Doktor's assistant then shot and killed Trowa and a nameless young engineer who had been working on Heavyarms offered to take the dead man's name and Gundam with no interest in carrying out Operation Meteor. S was presumed dead along with the other Gundam scientists on Peacemillion.
Instructor H (H教授, Eichi Kyōju) [EZ, W, EW]
The engineer and creator of the Gundam Sandrock, and Quatre Winner's mentor. He is rather fat, with a receding hairline that curls up in the back, and a long, thin, dark mustache that stands straight out at each end. A worker at MO-III, he originally met Quatre when the young heir's shuttle was hijacked by the Maganac Corps (as detailed in the Episode Zero manga). After learning of the youth's strength and resolve, he ended up taking a job as Quatre's tutor while borrowing Winner's family resources to build Sandrock. Realizing that he couldn't take away Quatre's kind nature, H rejected Operation Meteor and sent the boy to Earth to join the Maganacs. He appears to be the most reluctant of the engineers to reveal information on the Gundams. He is responsible for leaving the blueprints of Wing Zero behind in his facility. H was presumed dead along with the other scientists on Peacemillion.
Master O (老師O, Rōshi Ō) [EZ, W, EW]
The engineer and creator of the Shenlong Gundam, and Wufei Chang's mentor. Of imposing stature and spear-bald, O was a powerful and athletic expert in many forms of martial arts, a skill he brings to the mobile suits he creates. Unlike the other engineers, he wanted his young ward to follow Operation Meteor, disregarding Wufei's wife's death; this led to a rift between mentor and protege. O was presumed dead along with the other Gundam scientists on Peacemillion.
Howard (ハワード, Hawādo) [EZ, W, BP]
One of the original engineers who designed the OZ-00MS Tallgeese prototype mobile suit along with the five men who would become the Gundam engineers. But unlike them, Howard chose to live a relatively calm life, operating a salvage boat on Earth as part of the Sweeper Group. Howard repairs both Duo Maxwell's and Zechs Merquise's mobile suits, the latter after he found Zechs washed up on the beach with his Tallgeese. During Operation Meteor, he helped Duo and Heero; later in the conflict, he retrieved Peacemillion, which he co-created and became the flagship for all five of the Gundams. Howard survived the Eve Wars and stayed at the former Lunar Base as custodian of the Gundams. His Hawaiian shirts and wraparound shades make him the most colorfully dressed character in the series.

== Maganac Corps ==
Rashid Kurama (ラシード・クラマ, Rashīdo Kurama) [EZ, W, EW]
The leader of the Maganac Corps, he is a large, bearded man who is one of Quatre's best friends and allies. Above all else, he values his teammates' lives and treats each of them as a family (Maganac is derived from 'mag-anak', the Tagalog word for a blood relative or clan). His customized WMS-03 Maganac mobile suit has a distinctive commander's fin and flared shoulder armor, which would inspire the design of the Gundam Sandrock.

== Organization of the Zodiac (OZ)/OZ Prize ==
The main supporting cast, from left: Lady Une, Treize, Dorothy, Zechs, Relena, Sally, Noin and Catherine.

Zechs Merquise (ゼクス・マーキス, Zekusu Mākisu) [EZ, W, BT, EW]
OZ's ace mobile suit pilot is also known as the "Lightning Baron", later promoted to "Lightning Count" (since he "fights like lightning" to strike his enemies fast and without warning). While he wears a mask supposedly to hide a facial deformity, the truth is he uses it to hide his true identity Milliardo Peacecraft (ミリアルド・ピースクラフト, Miriyarudo Pīsukurafuto), the lost son of the pacifist Peacecraft family. After the United Earth Sphere Alliance destroyed the Peacecrafts as King Peacecraft was considered a threat to their totalitarian rule of Earth and the colonies, Zechs became an OZ soldier to seek revenge on the Alliance for the murder of his family by working his way through the inside. After acquiring the Tallgeese prototype mobile suit, Zechs succeeded in freeing the Sanc Kingdom (his homeland) from the Alliance's control. Considering himself too tainted to revive the Kingdom, Zechs instead pushed his younger sister Relena Peacecraft to take up their parents' legacy. After witnessing the Sanc Kingdom fall a second time and becoming disillusioned, Zechs accepts the rebel organization White Fang's offer to become its leader. During this time, he pilots OZ-13MS Gundam Epyon. Disgusted by the state of human affairs, he sought to destroy the planet and leave civilization to the "innocent" colonies (though this attitude is simply a ruse to help end the war). He vanished in a final duel with Heero Yuy, apparently sacrificing himself to destroy Libra's main reactor. But he reappeared one year later, piloting the OZ-00MS2B Tallgeese III. Joining the Preventer organization under the codename "Wind", he allied himself with the Gundam pilots to stop Dekim Barton's plan to carry out the original Operation Meteor. Zech's character is also very similar to Char Aznable from the original Mobile Suit Gundam series. Zechs Merquise / Milliardo Peacecraft was given voice by Takehito Koyasu in the Japanese version and Brian Drummond in the English dub.
Treize Khushrenada (トレーズ・クシュリナーダ, Torēzu Kushurināda) [EZ, W]
The leader of the Specials (aka OZ) and the primary Anti-Hero of Gundam Wing. Treize was born into privilege as a nephew of the Dermail family. He is a charismatic leader with a strong sense of ideals and an understanding of human nature that give him a devoted following among the men who serve him. According to the Episode Zero manga, he was originally a piloting instructor that was injured in a battle on colony X-18999 and met nurse Leia Barton at her father Dekim's hospital. They formed a bond based on mutual respect which is believed to have produced a daughter (Mariemaia). After General Catalonia's death, Treize was promoted to the leader of the Specials. He was close friends with Zechs Merquise and one of the few people to know Zechs' true identity. Treize's traditional views on combat and honor led to his opposition to the Romefeller Foundation, which was beginning to develop automated mobile doll weapons. He opposed this because he was a firm believer in tradition and honor, and felt that mobile dolls would make humans unnecessary in battle and therefore make warfare meaningless. His departure from the Foundation caused a similarly minded part of OZ to split into what was known as the Treize Faction. Though placed under house arrest, Treize was eventually freed by loyalists and took over the leadership of the World Nation. He piloted the OZ-00MS2 Tallgeese II during this time. He met his end in battle against Chang Wufei, apparently of his own volition. Treize was also an accomplished mobile suit designer as he created both the OZ-13MS Gundam Epyon and the OZ-00MS2B Tallgeese III. Treize Khushrenada was given voice by Ryoutarou Okiayu in Japanese and David Kaye in English.
Lucrezia Noin (ルクレツィア・ノイン, Rukuretsia Noin) [EZ, W, BP, EW]
A woman descended from Italian nobility, Noin (who goes only by her surname, telling her instructor Treize in the Episode Zero manga that "there's no gender among soldiers in the battlefield") was the instructor at the Alliance's Lake Victoria Academy, which trained soldiers in the use of mobile suits. It was mentioned in the series that she got the second-highest grade in the history of Lake Victoria Academy (Zechs received the highest grade, although he claims it was only because Noin intentionally sought second place, to make him look better). She tended to take a motherly attitude towards her charges and was predictably crushed when one of her graduating classes was killed in a nighttime ambush on the base by Chang Wufei. After being defeated and humiliated by Wufei, she left the Academy and followed Zechs in his mission of defeating the Gundams. She piloted a green OZ-07AMS Aries mobile suit during her time in OZ, which stood out among the standard blue/black Aries fleet. Noin was one of the few who knew that Zechs' true identity was Milliardo Peacecraft and obeyed his wishes in discreetly looking after his little sister, Relena. Noin ended up leaving OZ to act as Relena's royal guard, secretly founding a defense team for the Sanc Kingdom; from here until the end of the series (including Endless Waltz), she piloted a white OZ-12SMS Taurus suit (as opposed to the standard black Taurus). After the Kingdom fell, Noin went to space with the Gundam pilots and participated in the final battles with White Fang. She then joined the Preventer organization with the codename "Fire". After the end of the Mariemaia Rebellion, she went to Mars with Zechs to help with the terraforming project. Noin has been deeply in love with Zechs for many years. Lucrezia Noin was given voice by Chisa Yokoyama in Japanese and Saffron Henderson in English.
Lady Une (レディ・アン, Redi An) [EZ, W, GU, BP, EW]
Treize's right-hand woman, Lady Une had a reputation as a fierce commander. Under his orders, she assassinated Vice Foreign Minister Darlian for knowing the truth about OZ and ordered the assassination of his daughter Relena when Relena witnessed the murder. Her methods are brutal and ruthless, but effective; during a battle with the Gundams, she forced their surrender by threatening to destroy a colony with the Alliance's missile satellites if they did not hand over their Gundams; Heero, in response, self-detonated his Gundam, which bought the others time to escape. Afterward, Treize encouraged her to be more graceful. This created a mental conflict in Une, causing her to develop an entirely new personality for her more gentle, beatific attitude. As Treize began to split with Romefeller, Une was sent to free Duo, Wufei, and the Gundam engineers from the Lunar Base, but was shot by Chief Engineer Tsubarov. While recovering from her wound, Une resolved her mental conflict, becoming a well-rounded, kind, and resolute woman. Shortly after the end of the war, Une was picked to become the leader of the new Earth government's peace watch group, the Preventers; her code name is "Gold". Her timely intervention saved the lives of both Relena and Mariemaia, revealing that Dekim's actions were not in line with Treize's philosophy. Once the rebellion ended, Une decided to take care of Mariemaia but also kept her position as head of the Preventer organization. Lady Une was given voice by Sayuri Yamauchi In Japanese and Enuka Okuma in English.
Trant Clark (トラント・クラーク, Toranto Kurāku) [W]
An overly ambitious OZ soldier, Trant found the Wing Gundam Zero after it had been abandoned by Quatre, and decided to test the limits of the ZERO System. First, he tried to force Heero to test Wing Zero behind Tsubarov's back, but this backfired when the System overwhelmed Heero's mind, and only Quatre was able to stop Heero from going out of control. Later, after locating Duo, Trant forced the Gundam pilot to use the Wing Zero, so he could continue to gauge its abilities. When Duo attempted to escape, Trant piloted the Wing Zero and fought the Gundam Deathscythe Hell, but was apparently driven insane by the ZERO System and died after his helmet shattered. In the manga adaptation of Gundam Wing, he was childhood friends with Hilde Schbeiker.
Alex (アレックス, Arekkusu) [W]
Alex, called sign Red Cancer, was an OZ Lieutenant and Cancer pilot who was trained by Noin at Lake Victoria Academy and then joined OZ. He led the Number 33 Independent Troops of Northeast Africa, Somalia front. Along with Muller, he was hunting down former Alliance members and attacking them in the name of Treize Khushrenada. He was killed by Zechs after violating the terms of surrender during an attack on the Mogadishu Fortress. Alex was generally quieter than his partner Muller.
Mueller (ミュラー, Myurā) [W]
Call sign Blue Angel, he was an OZ Lieutenant and Aries pilot who was trained by Noin at Lake Victoria Academy and then joined OZ. He was a member of the Number 33 Independent Troops of Northeast Africa, Somalia front. Along with Alex, he was hunting down former Alliance members and attacking them in the name of Treize Khushrenada. He was killed by Zechs after violating the terms of surrender during an attack on the Mogadishu Fortress. Muller was significantly more hot-headed than his partner Alex. (Also listed as Mueller in some sources.)
Broden (ブローデン, Burōden) [BP]
The captain of OZ's 4th Flying Squadron, Broden, and his men were among the OZ soldiers who refused to surrender following the Eve Wars. He believed in the existence of the mobile doll plant Vulkanus since his unit was assigned to bring resource-laden asteroids to the plant just before the war's end. Broden held beliefs similar to Treize, but looked outwards instead of inwards; he wanted to use Vulkanus to inspire humanity to explore deep space. His sense of honor and ambition lead to his becoming good friends with Chang Wufei. Broden was killed by the traitorous Klementz during the battle for Vulkanus, which lead Wufei to join the Mariemaia Army to help achieve Broden's dream of bringing progress to humanity.
Luna Armonia (ルーナ・アルモニア, Rūna Arumonia) [GU]
A war orphan who lost her parents because of the Alliance, Luna and her big sister Soris joined a rebel organization at an early age. At one point, they were candidates for Gundam pilots (specifically implied to be for the Wing Gundam), but they lost out and were left behind. Sometime after, the sisters were found and taken in by OZ's Valder Farkill, who made them his personal guard and gave Luna the Mercurius Shuivan suit. Luna was the main part of a plan to capture MO-V's Adin Barnett and his Gundam Griepe but began sympathizing with the young man because of their similar pasts. She was killed by Grandshario's Grand Nova cannon, fired by Valder because he deemed the defeated girl useless. Luna Armonia is voiced by Saeko Shimazu.
Soris Armonia (ソリス・アルモニア, Sorisu Arumonia) [GU]
When her parents were killed, Soris had to juggle the roles of soldier and big sister to Luna. She was taken in by Valder as a bodyguard but seems to have developed an attraction to her commander. Soris had much more conviction than Luna when it came to combat, at one point questioning whether Adin had the conviction to be the colonies' protector like the five Operation Meteor Gundams. She was killed along with her sister by the Grand Nova cannon. Her mobile suit was the Vayeate Shuivan. Soris Armonia is voiced by Yumi Touma.
Broom Brooks (ブルム・ブロックス, Burumu Burokkusu) [GU]
One of the Stardust Knights and the commanders of OZ's black ops squadron, Prize. Like Rosshe, Broom possessed a strong sense of honor, at the same time colored for his great distaste for Treize and especially Lady Une. He was killed by Valder Farkill during the early stages of the coup that brought Farkill to power as Prize's leader. He piloted the Leo-N.
Valder Farkill (ヴァルダー・ファーキル, Varudā Fākiru) [GU]
A member of the Specials, Valder was a member of Zechs Merquise's unit. During the rebellion against the Alliance, he scored more kills than the rest of his team combined, earning him the nickname "Dark General of Destruction". Some time later, Romafeller's Doctor Berg invited the famously ruthless Farkill to seize control of Prize and bring a decisive end to the conflict at MO-V. Cold and calculating, Valder thought of war in much the same terms as a game of chess. His biggest downfall was his arrogance; he believed that the only person worthy of his skill was Treize, whom he hoped to defeat in combat before taking over leadership of OZ. During the final battle, Valder was stunned by the news of Treize's death and was easily killed by Adin Barnett. Valder Farkill is voiced by Juurouta Kosugi.
Rosshe Natono (ロッシェ・ナトゥーノ, Rosshe Natōno) [GU]
The leader of OZ Prize and the Stardust Knights. Rosshe is a man possessed of a strong sense of honor and fair-play, though sometimes given to fits of near-madness in battle (a facet of his personality which disappears in later chapters). He considers the Gundams to be the ultimate prey, but is livid when his Leo-S isn't enough to defeat Adin Barnett's Geminass 01. He briefly piloted the Aesculapius, but Doctor Berg had him replaced when he was unable to bring out the Gundam's full potential. Rosshe was backstabbed (literally as well as figuratively) by his teammate Kratz Shelby during Valder Farkill's coup, and was rescued by Adin. Soon after, Rosshe became a valued member of MO-V's defense force, piloting the L.O. Booster. Rosshe Natono is voiced by Ryo Horikawa.
Lowe Sernan (ロウ・サーナン, Rō Sānan) [GU]
An OZ Special Lieutenant and mechanic, Sernan was under Lady Une's orders when he received word that the colony MO-V was under Prize jurisdiction. Lieutenant Nichol, hiding this from Une, ordered Sernan to investigate MO-V and find out what was so important about it. As he neared the colony, he was attacked by Broom Brooks but was fortunately saved by the Barnett brothers. After explaining his situation, Sernan was welcomed to join MO-V's staff as a mobile suit mechanic. His off-hand comments about the five Gundams on Earth inspired Adin to proclaim the Geminass 01 a Gundam, which continued with MO-V's other G-Units. After the conflict's end, Sernan joined Preventer under the codename "Quavorze", keeping an eye on MO-V.
Kratz Shelby (クラーツ・シェルビィ, Kurātsu Sherubi) [GU]
One of the Stardust Knights and OZ Prize's leaders, Kratz held the honor in much lower regard than his compatriots. As the assault on MO-V dragged on, his patience with Rosshe's actions began to wear thin. When Valder Farkill appeared to take over Prize, Kratz wholeheartedly supported him to the point of backstabbing Rosshe. However, Kratz's skills were still inferior to Rosshe's, and after his repeated defeats at the hands of MO-V's G-Units, he decided that he needed a Gundam to defeat them. Eventually, Doctor Berg built the Burnlapius for Kratz, and though his use of the PX System allowed him to defeat Rosshe and the L.O. Booster, an extended battle with Odell allowed the System to take its toll, destroying both his mind and his Gundam.
Aretha Walker (アリサ・ウォーカー, Arisa Uōkā) [GU]
One of the soldiers in OZ Prize, Aretha was in charge of more mundane operations, answering only to the Stardust Knights. Many times, she attempted to convince Rosshe to let her handle the operation at MO-V, but he insisted on taking care of things personally. When Rosshe was killed, Aretha was contacted by Silver Crown with a plan. She delivered the Griepe to Adin, defecting to MO-V shortly thereafter. She is in love with Rosshe, who seems to have realized this all along but didn't acknowledge her feelings until after they met on MO-V.
Trinoi Levinski (トライノイ・リヴィンスキー, Torainoi Revinsukī) [TI]
A former OZ soldier, Trinoi was forced into retirement due to combat injuries sustained to his left hand. Sometime after this, Trinoi met Tiel Nonbleu and was convinced to aid in her plan to find her brother. After training her and her friend RKrung in mobile suit piloting, he led the infiltration of Romafeller's hidden Gundam plant and stole a Gundam Dellinger Arms. When the trio finally reached the Graveyard of Soldiers, they ran into Romafeller's pursuit force, and Trinoi was able to destroy both enemy Gundams, though at the cost of his own life.
Karl Noembreux (カール・ノンブルー, Kāru Nonburū) [TI]
An OZ mobile suit pilot, Noembreux was assigned to pilot Gundam Lucifer during its test run. However, the ZERO System 2.0 proved unstable and drove Noembleux mad, causing him to believe that he could end all war by destroying those who would perpetuate it. Eventually, he encountered his younger sister Tiel, who had led an elaborate chase to find him. Noembreux was beyond aid at this point, and when his sister refused to help carry out his mad plan, he attacked, and the two siblings ended up dying as they fell into Earth's atmosphere.

== Romefeller Foundation ==
Dorothy Catalonia (ドロシー・カタロニア, Doroshī Kataronia) [W, BP, EW, FT]
The granddaughter of Duke Dermail and daughter of former OZ leader General Catalonia, Dorothy first appears masquerading as an ordinary student at the school Relena runs in the Sanc Kingdom. Though she said she admired Relena, Dorothy held many opposite beliefs, such as her belief that war is an essential part of humanity and will never go away. As Romefeller attacked the Kingdom, Dorothy revealed her true mission (to spy on the nation for Romefeller), and offered Relena the chance to stop the attack by becoming Romefeller's public face. Relena agreed, and as she was declared Queen of the World Nation, Dorothy stayed with her to observe her actions. When Treize deposed Relena, Relena went to space to try and stop her brother Milliardo from destroying the Earth; Dorothy, who accompanied Relena, chose to join White Fang, and often acted as Zechs' second-in-command (much to Treize's ire). As the battle came to a head, she confronted Quatre inside Libra and forced him into a fencing match, which ended with him being stabbed through the side. As they fought, the truth about Dorothy came out: though she claimed to love warfare, she deeply hated it for taking her father (General Catalonia)'s life, and put on a strong face to the world. After being gently confronted by Trowa, she escaped Libra and later visited Milliardo's grave to pay her respects to the man, who she thought was dead (Milliardo actually resurfaced the following year). In the next year, Dorothy was sought out as the last heir of Romefeller, and the only one with a clue to the location of the mobile doll plant Vulkanus. Though her attempts to set Heero and Relena up romantically failed, she gave the pair her grandfather's notes and allowed them the use of her computer database, which allowed them to crack the code and locate Vulkanus. During Mariemaia's rebellion, Dorothy appeared again, first taunting the civilians of Brussels into action, then helping them when they finally decided to heed Relena's words and reach for peace with their own hands. In Frozen Teardrop, she is referred to as the President of the ESUN. Dorothy Catalonia is voiced by Naoko Matsui in Japanese and by Cathy Weseluck in English.
Duke Dermail (デルマイユ侯, Derumaiyu-kō) [W]
The head of Romefeller, Dermail was an ambitious and ruthless man. His primary goal was to encourage more war and line the organization's pockets with more money by developing new weapons. Dermail mainly appeared as a background figure in the early part of the series, but as Romefeller began pursuing mobile dolls, they took a more active role as the antagonist group of the series. Dermail hated the Sanc Kingdom for preventing Romefeller's complete domination of the world, but tacitly listened to Dorothy's suggestion of making Relena the chief representative of Romefeller, to appeal to the masses. For Dermail, the plan backfired, and Relena became more powerful than him, encouraging the Foundation to disarm and seek peace with the colonies. When White Fang rose up to oppose the World Nation, Dermail went to space to oversee the battle from Barge, but was killed by White Fang's mobile dolls en route. Ironically, his granddaughter Dorothy referred to his death as that of "a brave soldier" when in fact Dermail had turned and cowered from the blasts that ended his life. Duke Dermail is voiced by Osamu Kato in Japanese and by Jim Byrnes in English.
Chief Engineer Tsubarov (ツバロフ技師長, Tsubarofu-gishichō) [W]
Romefeller's chief weapons developer, his pride and joy were his mobile dolls. He hated mobile suits and any suits that could surpass his mobile dolls, but this caused him to underestimate the Gundams and their power. He rejected the ZERO System (it could have been use for the mobile dolls, an idea utilized by White Fang). Believing that his automated weapons would be the next stage of warfare, he talked Duke Dermail into pursuing their development over that of traditional mobile suits. He was also apparently the mind behind Vulkanus, the mobile doll plant that was sought by all sides in the summer of AC 196. When White Fang's rebellion began, Tsubarov was at the Lunar Base, overseeing the construction of the new Virgo II, but the Virgo II couldn't defeat the Gundams even if the Gundams were 70% complete. Tsubarov failed to kill the Gundam Pilots numerous times. Though he was captured by the rebels during their takeover, Tsubarov managed to escape to a room where he was able to activate the mobile dolls guarding the base. As the mobile dolls clashed with both the White Fang forces and Chang Wufei's Altron Gundam inside the base, Tsubarov was driven insane with fear. He ranted that he and his precious mobile dolls would rule the world (which turns out to be a dream he had but his dream shattered) and both were invincible—while the room he was in was shaking and crumbling around him, and then exploded, killing him and destroying the controls for his mobile dolls. His death was the beginning of the fall of the Romefeller Foundation. On the subtitles on the DVDs, his name is incorrectly spelled as "Tubarov".
Doctor Berg (ドクター・ペルゲ, Dokutā Beruge) [GU]
One of Duke Dermail's top agents, Doctor Berg was an accomplished mobile suit designer who was placed at the asteroid colony MO-V. However, the colony's chairman Roga Herman chose to develop space travel instead of mobile suits. Enraged, Berg sabotaged the shuttle, killing Mark Barnett and his wife and convincing Herman to allow him to build his mobile suits. The fruits of his labors were the G-Units, mobile suits with the ability to rapidly change their equipment and the powerful but dangerous PX System. However, the whole time Berg was passing information along to Romafeller, who sent OZ Prize to MO-V to collect the G-Units. Berg revealed his treachery shortly after their arrival, and continued building new G-Units on Grandshario. Wanting to develop the ultimate weapon, Berg built the Gundam Griepe and handed it to Adin Barnett to test. When Odell Barnett attacked Grandshario, Berg used his intimate knowledge of Aesculapius' abilities and Odell's skills to stop him. However, he made the mistake of taunting Odell with the fact that Berg was the one who killed the pilot's parents. Enraged, Odell activated PX Overdrive and crashed into Grandshario, killing Berg just after he activated his failsafe that would drive Grandshario to decimate humanity.
Doppelt (ドッペルト, Dopperuto) [TI]
A Romefeller loyalist who was present at the theft of the mass-production Gundams. Dobert was assigned to the Sandleon and sent to kill the thieves, but was defeated twice in combat by Tiel Nonbleu and her friends, dying in the second battle.
Semis (セミス, Semisu) [TI]
A Romefeller loyalist who was present at the theft of the mass-production Gundams, Semis was assigned to track down and kill the thieves. She piloted the Deathscythe Guilty, but was defeated once, thanks to a surprise attack by Krung Ponramaai's T'ien-Lung Gundam. Even though her machine was upgraded with parts from the wreckage of the Hydra Gundam, Semis was killed in combat with Trinoi Levinsky's Gundam Dellinger Arms at the Graveyard of Soldiers.

== United Earth Sphere Alliance ==
Sally Po (サリィ・ポォ, Sarī Pō) [EZ, W, BP, EW]
An Alliance Major, she was assigned to the decommission of colony A0206 (where Chang Wufei's clan lived), where she tried unsuccessfully to convince General Septem not to go through with his plan to use poison gas to kill the colonists. When the mobile suit force attempting to gas the colony was wiped out, Sally declared the operation a success and pulled back; as a result of her actions, she was sent to work in an Alliance hospital in Japan. Several days after Operation Meteor began, Relena Darlian took Heero Yuy to this hospital, where Sally learned of the young man's unusually strong body and took an interest in him. During OZ's internal takeover of the Alliance, Sally and her forces avoid being captured. She then became an active member of the small rebellions against OZ and one of the Gundam pilots' strongest allies, helping them in tight spots and recovering both the Wing Gundam and the Gundam Heavyarms at different points in the conflict. After the war's end, Sally signed on with the Preventers, using the codename "Water", and invited Wufei to join their ranks after the Mariemaia Rebellion ended. In the prologue to the novel Frozen Teardrop, her daughter Kathy Po is introduced. Sally Po was given voice by Yumi Tōma in Japanese and both Moneca Stori (episodes 3-12) and then Samantha Ferris (episodes 20-49 and Endless Waltz) in English.
General Septem (セプテム将軍, Seputemu-shōgun) [EZ, W]
The head of the Alliance's space forces, Septem was a harsh man by all accounts. In AC 187, Dekim Barton hired assassin Odin Lowe to kill Septem during a visit to colony X-18999, but the attempt failed because of Dekim's warnings. Through the machinations of Treize and OZ, Septem is one of the few remaining high-ranking officials of the Alliance to survive the Gundam attack on the New Edwards Base. After formally declaring war on the colonies immediately after Noventa's death, Lady Une throws him from a plane after he outlives his usefulness, and shoots him in the head as he falls to ensure his death.

== White Fang ==
Quinze (カーンズ, Kānzu) [EZ, W, GU]
The leader of White Fang, he was once one of colonial leader Heero Yuy's most trusted aides and was present when the colonial leader was gunned down. Learning that the Alliance (actually OZ) was behind the assassination, Quinze and his compatriot Dekim Barton began formulating plans for revenge. While Dekim had more elaborate plans, Quinze began leading a series of small-scale rebellions against the Alliance. Eventually, his ambitions would give rise to the group known as White Fang. Seeking powerful allies, he attempted to recruit the Gundam pilots to the White Fang's cause. In the end, the only one who accepted was Milliardo Peacecraft as he became the public face of the rebel group. He began feeling that this was a mistake as he gradually disagreed more and more with Milliardo's goals. During the final battle, Quinze attempted to kill the Gundam scientists on Peacemillion but was unable to prevent them from setting off a chain reaction in the battleship's engines, moving Peacemillion and Libra away from the Earth and presumably killing all six men in the process.
Sedici (セディッチ, Seditchi) [W]
A White Fang loyalist, Sedici was planted in OZ to learn about their secret plans. His information was pivotal to the Artemis Revolution, which brought White Fang to power as well as earning them Libra and the Virgo IIs. Sedici was killed in battle by Barge's Beam Cannon during White Fang's assault on Barge.
Sogran (ソグラン, Soguran) [BT]
A former commander of White Fang, Sogran made a deal with the CEO of the Century Discover Corporation to capture the Gundams for weapons research. To reach this goal, Sogran manipulated several White Fang members into trying to start a new rebellion, instructing them to try to buy the Gundam pilots' services (or at least buy their Gundams). When this failed, Sogran had his men try to kill the pilots and seize the Gundams by force. Eventually, he was confronted by Heero, Trowa and Ralph Kurt. Arrogantly believing he had victory in his hands, Sogran revealed the truth of his plan to the trio, only to have Heero reveal that the public address system was on. With that, the trio left Sogran to the mercies of the people he had just betrayed.
Ralph Kurt (ラルフ・カート, Rarufu Kāto) [BT]
As a child, Ralph's colony was attacked by the Alliance, killing his parents in the process. He managed to escape with his childhood friend, Chris Marley. Later in life, Ralph was at one time a member of the mercenary group that included the future Gundam pilot Trowa Barton. Ironically, the two admired one another for opposite reasons: while the nameless boy envied Ralph for his friendship with the other soldiers, Ralph admired him for his quiet skill and firm conviction, believing the boy to be the Perfect Soldier. Several years later, Ralph joined White Fang, only to end up losing in the Eve Wars; the next year, he came back into Trowa's life, attempting to buy Heavyarms for the new war that White Fang's remnants planned to start. Trowa refused, and Ralph was brought into direct conflict with his former ally. The Gundam pilots managed to capture Ralph, and Trowa revealed to Ralph that Sogran was simply using Ralph and his men. Along with Heero and Trowa, Ralph confronted Sogran, who revealed his deceit (secretly broadcast by Heero over the public address system). Later, saying goodbye to Trowa, Ralph warned his old friend that as long as he kept the name Trowa Barton, "those" people would be looking for him.
Chris Marley (クリス・マーリィー, Kurisu Mārī) [BT]
When she was young, Chris lost her parents in an Alliance attack on her colony. She would have died herself, but she was saved by her friend Ralph Kurt. Growing up, she deeply resented the Alliance (and, by extension, Earth) for what they did, and joined White Fang. After the war, she agreed to participate in a new plan for revenge by starting a new war with the assassination of important figures in the Earth government. For her part, Chris became Vice Foreign Minister Relena Darlian's personal assistant, secretly letting White Fang hit squads know where the young diplomat was going to be at all times. After being saved by Heero Yuy from one assassination attempt, Relena and Chris accompanied him to the ruins of Chris' old home colony. Eventually, Heero revealed that he knew about Chris' spying all along, and showed her that the Gundams weren't on the colony. She finally learned the truth behind the new rebellion, and gave up on her revenge after a heartfelt talk with Relena. Chris would go on to live a peaceful life with Ralph, the two having finally realized their true feelings for one another.
Dornille (ドルニエ, Dorunie) [GU]
A White Fang officer, Dornille was sent to MO-V in an attempt to capture the G-Units for their purposes. For him, they ran afoul of Kratz Shelby and his new Gundam Burnlapius and were quickly killed, with their Virgo IIs serving to strengthen Prize's arsenal.

== MO-V ==
Adin Barnett (アディン・バーネット, Adin Bānetto) [GU]
The pilot of Geminass 01 and G-Unit's main character. Adin is a 17-year-old test pilot who lost his parents in a shuttle accident, but was raised by the colony's chief representative and feels like everyone on the colony is his family. Adin tends to be brash and impulsive, which limits his combat performance. Despite this, his brother Odell is assured that someday Adin will surpass his skill. At first Adin is incapable of using the PX System, but following his brother's apparent death he begins training to use the dangerous system, and uses it to good effect to drive back Rosshe Natono when he appears with the new Gundam Aesculapius. Soon after, though, Adin would be challenged by Prize's Silver Crown, whom he never once suspected of being his brother (despite the obvious signs). When Valder Farkill took over Prize, Adin saved Rosshe's life, figuring that it was the right thing to do. Later on, Adin received the Gundam Griepe and learned of his brother's true fate, using the Griepe to drive Farkill off. When Luna Armonia came to the colony, Adin fell for her, an attraction which continued even though she took him to Farkill at gunpoint. Luna's death deeply affected him, and Adin became driven to end the conflict before any more lives were lost. He challenged Farkill to a final battle, where his increasing skill and Farkill's arrogance gave him the victory. When Doctor Berg's doomsday plan sent Grandshario on a rampage to destroy the colonies and Earth, Adin was the one to pilot the combined G-Unit and destroy the battleship, bringing an end to the conflict for good. Adin Barnett is voiced by Hiro Yuuki.
Odell Barnett (オデル・バーネット, Oderu Bānetto) [GU]
The pilot of Geminass 02 and MO-V's top pilot, Odell had to help raise his younger brother after the loss of their parents. Odell grew into a skilled pilot, able of using the G-Unit's PX System with incredible skill. However, when OZ Prize attacked, a reckless Adin was nearly killed. Using the System, Odell managed to get his brother to safety, but ended up losing his Gundam (and apparently his life as well). With Berg's help, he adopted the identity Silver Crown (シルヴァ・クラウン) and secretly aided MO-V from within OZ. Prize's new leader Valder Farkill realized what was happening and attacked Odell as he attempted to send the Gundam Griepe to Adin. After getting away from OZ, Odell returned to service at MO-V. Piloting Aesculapius, he participated in the final battle, helping to defeat Kratz and personally finishing Berg. Several months later, he married Tricia and settled down to help develop space travel as his father wished. Odell Barnett is voiced by Kyousei Tsukui.
Mark Barnett [GU]
Adin and Odell's late father, his dream was for mankind to explore the stars. He developed a new type of engine that would go on to be used in the Gundam Griepe. He and his wife were killed in a shuttle explosion that was thought to be an accident, but had actually been planned by his rival Doctor Berg, who was jealous that his mobile suits had been passed up for Mark's spaceships.
Lucie Aisley (ルシエ・アイズリー, Rushie Aizurī) [GU]
A mechanic and systems operator on MO-V, Lucie was one of the members of the G-Unit Project. Her main job was to oversee data collection during the testing phase of the project. However, her brash attitude often conflicted with Adin's, adding to the pseudo-romantic tension between the two. During Luna Armonia's stay on MO-V, Lucie was deeply jealous of her. Eventually, Lucie realized her feelings for him, but despite a tender moment just before the final battle, the two of them were back to their usual antics soon enough.
Tricia Farrel (トリシア・ファレル, Torishia Fareru) [GU]
MO-V's operator, Tricia often serves as the voice of common sense for her more passionate co-workers. She was engaged to Odell, a fact which made his apparent death even harder for everyone to take. However, it was Tricia's words to Adin that helped bring him out of the depression he suffered following Odell's disappearance, and allowed him to continue fighting Prize. After the conflict ended, Tricia and Odell were wed in a ceremony on MO-V.
Roga Herman (ロガ・ハーマン, Roga Hāman) [GU]
The chief representative and leader of MO-V, Roga's primary concern is the well-being of his people. Though a bit goofy and with a wandering eye for pretty girls (he happens to have a thing for Lady Une), he never lets such concerns get in the way of his duty. He was good friends with the Barnetts, and following their deaths, he raised their sons as his own.
Dick Higasaki (ディック・ヒガサキ, Dikku Higasaki) [GU, EW]
MO-V's cheery, playful engineer, Dick is most easily recognized by his baseball cap and basketball jersey. Despite his somewhat goofy appearance, he's a top engineer and the colony's number-one guy when it comes to the G-Units. His mechanical expertise is such that he was able to create the defense-use mobile doll D-Unit using scrap from destroyed OZ-06MS Leos and a stolen copy of the Mobile Doll System. He also appears in the manga adaptation of Endless Waltz, as the Preventer engineer in charge of the Tallgeese III.

== Perfect Peace People (P3) ==
Victor Gaintz (ビクター・ゲインツ, Bikutā Geintsu) [BP]
A former member of White Fang, Victor disagreed with Quinze's decision to invite Zechs as the group's leader. When Quinze went ahead with his idea, Gaintz quit in protest. He resurfaced the following summer as the leader of the Perfect Peace People, an organization calling for even more sweeping disarmaments than Relena. However, this is all a ruse for P3 to gain power. Gaintz came across the location and codes for Vulkanus, and wanted all resistance out of the way so he could take over. His strongest point was for the elimination of the Gundams, claiming that the pilots could lose control and decide to take over. When he managed to capture Scorpio, Gaintz argued his rhetoric against the pilots, only to have Heero counter that they don't desire power and will never lose control. After using ZERO to learn the truth about Gaintz, Heero finished him off with the Wing Gundam Zero.
Klementz (クレメンツ, Kurementsu) [BP]
One of Captain Broden's soldiers, Klementz is highly distrustful of Wufei, believing him to be a spy. However, it is later discovered that this attitude was simply a cover for Klementz, who is the real spy, working for the Perfect Peace People. He kills Broden and attempts to turn Vulkanus' mobile dolls on the Gundams, only to be knocked unconscious by Duo. His fate after that point remains uncertain.

== Mariemaia Army/Barton Foundation ==
Dekim Barton (デキム・バートン, Dekimu Bāton) [EZ, BT, EW]
Originally one of colonial leader Heero Yuy's top aides, Dekim was motivated by both colonial liberation and revenge for Yuy's death. Having killed Yuy's assassin Odin Lowe, faking his death soon after, Dekim plotted for the colonies to take over the Earth Sphere under his family's rule. To that end, he tracked down five of the engineers who had created the Tallgeese and commissioned them to create the Gundams for use with his ultimate plan: Operation Meteor. As his plan was to drop colonies onto Earth at strategic locations so the Gundams can exploit ensuing chaos, Dekim is furious when the scientists and their young pilots refused to carry Operation Meteor out as intended. This forces him to work out a new version of Operation Meteor involving the MMS-01 Serpent mobile suit left behind by OZ and the illegitimate child of his daughter Leia and Treize Khushrenada to win the latter's remaining followers to his cause. Dekim commences his plan on Christmas Eve AC 196, only for the Gundam pilots to intervene while being joined by the common people. Refusing to accept defeat, Dekim attempts to kill Relena Darlian and ends wounding Mariemaia when took the bullet before being shot in the head by one Treize's supporters.
Mariemaia Barton/Mariemaia Khushrenada (マリーメイア・バートン/マリーメイア・クシュリナーダ, Marīmeia Bāton/Merīmeia Kushurināda) [EZ, BT, EW]
A young child, Mariemaia is apparently the daughter of Leia Barton and Treize Khushrenada, conceived during the meeting between the two on Colony X-18999 (as detailed in the Episode Zero manga). Supposedly dying at an early age, Mariemaia later resurfaced as the figurehead of the Mariemaia Army, which largely consisted of soldiers who had been loyal to Treize. Thanks to her grandfather Dekim's grooming, she was fully prepared to ravage the Earth and take her place as the World Sovereign, believing this to be what her father Treize would have wanted. She continued believing this until Relena Darlian slapped some sense into her—literally. When Lady Une explains to the young girl that her grandfather is using her, Mariemaia realizes her mistake and jumped in front of Relena to save her from being killed by Dekim. It resulted in Mariemaia being shot through the spine as she was given medical attention, and is later shown (in a wheelchair though later appearances show her to have healed) visiting her father's grave with Lady Une. Mariemaia Barton / Mariemaia Khushrenada was given voice by Rei Sakuma in Japanese and Maggie Blue O'Hara in English.
Trowa Barton (トロワ・バートン, Torowa Bāton) [EZ, EW]
The spoiled son of Dekim Barton that was used to getting anything he wanted. Originally scheduled to be the pilot of the Gundam Heavyarms, he was furious when he learned that Doktor S and the other engineers didn't agree with Operation Meteor. As he prepared to tell his father of their betrayal, Trowa was shot in the back by a mechanic who feared for his family's safety on Earth and died. At that point, a nameless engineer offered to take over for the dead man as the new Trowa Barton. It is known that the original Trowa was apparently willing to tell No-Name about how his sister's daughter would be ruling the world after Operation Meteor but this appears mainly to have been boasting rather than true friendship or closeness. If Mariemaia is truly Treize Khushrenada's and Leia Barton's daughter, it can be assumed that the real Trowa is Mariemaia's uncle by blood.
Leia Barton (レイア・バートン, Reia Bāton) [EZ, EW]
The daughter of Dekim Barton and sister to the original Trowa Barton, Leia was working as a nurse at a Barton Foundation hospital when she met Treize Khushrenada after he was admitted after being wounded in battle. When he learned that General Septem had used the colony's weather system to put out a small fire, Treize lamented the man's foolishness, a sentiment Leia echoed. The two formed a connection based on mutual respect. Her relationship with Treize may have resulted in the birth to her daughter Mariemaia. She died of an illness shortly afterward.
Krung Ponramaai (クルング・ポンラマーイ, Kurungu Ponramāi) [TI]
A childhood friend of Tiel Nonbleu, Krung was part of the team that broke into Romefeller's secret factory and stole their mass production Gundams. In particular, Krung ended up with the T'ien-Lung Gundam. However, the entire plan was simply a ruse by Krung, who wanted the Gundam so that she could join up with the Mariemaia Army, believing in the ideals it espoused. Upon reaching the Graveyard of Soldiers, Krung revealed her deceit, using T'ien-Lung's ZERO System to activate a pair of Capricorn Mobile Dolls and attempting to kill Tiel. For her, Wing Seraphim's own ZERO System activated, allowing Tiel to (unwillingly) kill her former friend with a single attack.

== Civilians ==
Relena Darlian / Relena Peacecraft (リリーナ・ドーリアン/リリーナ・ピースクラフト, Rirīna Dōrian/Rirīna Pīsukorafuto) [EZ, W, BT, BP, EW]
The female lead of Gundam Wing. Relena first appears as the daughter of the Alliance's Vice Foreign Minister. When he was called away to work at the beginning of the series, Relena went home alone. This set up her encounter with Heero Yuy, who had washed ashore on the beach near the spaceport. Her encounter with the mysterious Gundam pilot spurred the young girl to learn more about him, despite his threats towards her. While visiting a colony with her father, Mr. Darlian was killed by Lady Une. As he was dying, he revealed that Relena is actually the daughter of the Peacecrafts, the leaders of the fallen pacifist Sanc Kingdom. During a fight between Heero and Zechs Merquise, Relena discovered from Lucrezia Noin that Zechs is her older brother. Soon afterward, Relena assumed her birthright, and restored the Sanc Kingdom according to her family's ideals, having opened the nation's borders as a neutral haven to those who wished to escape the growing war. Since Romefeller regarded the nation's pacifist stance as a threat, it began to focus most of its military attention on the Sanc Kingdom, particularly after Heero and Quatre arrived, seeking sanctuary from OZ assassins. With another invasion threatening to destroy the kingdom, Relena surrendered to protect her people, and formally dissolved the nation. At Dorothy Catalonia's urging, Relena accepted Duke Dermail's offer to become the public face of Romefeller, and she was formally declared Queen of the World. Though this was merely meant to be a public relations move, Relena garnered most of Romefeller's support, despite Dermail's intent to use Relena as a figurehead. When her brother (now going by his true name Milliardo Peacecraft) appeared as the leader of White Fang, Treize Khushrenada dismissed Relena from her position. He reasoned that now that she had laid the foundation for peace, he would provide what the military might require to bring it to fruition. Freed from her responsibility, Relena went to space, where she and Heero unsuccessfully attempted to reason with Milliardo, and dissuade him from escalating the war. After the war, Relena became the Vice Foreign Minister of the newly formed Earth Sphere Unified Nation, and assumed her adopted father's surname again. She spearheaded the creation of the Preventer Organization, and disarmament talks as an influential, high-ranking official. Relena was kidnapped by Dekim Barton, having intended to use her symbolic power to ensure Mariemaia's dominance. His motive for the kidnapping was for Relena to encourage the citizens to rebel, and take action themselves, to ensure peace. However, like Dermail before him, Barton drastically underestimated both Relena's character and her popularity. After Dekim's defeat, and the end of mobile suit warfare, Relena moved on to her next project, the terraformation of Mars. From early on, it is made obvious that Relena is in love with Heero, and he with her over time, which Heero's fellow Gundam pilot Duo acknowledged. At the end of the sequel novel series New Mobile Report Gundam Wing: Frozen Teardrop, Relena was asked by Heero to marry him, and she accepted his proposal. In the epilogue, which took place 5 months after the events of the final chapter, Relena is living happily with Heero on Mars, and the two were shown discussing their plans on marriage, and starting a family of their own. Relena Darlian / Relena Peacecraft was given voice by Akiko Yajima in Japanese and Lisa Ann Beley in English.
Catherine Bloom (キャスリン・ブルーム, Kyasarin Burūmu) [EZ, W, BT, EW]
A young woman who works as a knife thrower and acrobat for a travelling circus. In the Episode Zero manga, it was shown that when she was four years old, her family's circus wagon was caught in the crossfire of an Alliance bombing, which resulted in the death of her parents, and which separated her from her two-year-old brother Triton. Cathy was adopted by the members of her parents' circus, and grew up with them. When the Gundam pilot Trowa Barton asked to join the circus, Cathy convinced the manager to let him. She soon adopted a big sister attitude with Trowa, even after learning that he is the pilot of the Gundam Heavyarms. She also helped take care of Trowa's friends, including having fed Wufei, when he stayed with the circus following the failed Treize assassination, and having cared for Heero for over a month after he self-detonated the Wing Gundam. When Trowa lost his memory, Catherine happened upon him wandering the streets, and convinced him that she really was his older sister, trying to shelter him from the war (and his fellow Gundam pilots). However, when Quatre came to find Trowa, Trowa had a feeling that he knew Quatre and decided to leave again, promising to come back to Catherine. The novelization of Endless Waltz revealed that Trowa was, in fact, Triton Bloom, but neither he nor Catherine knew this. Catherine Bloom was given voice by Saori Sugimoto in Japanese, and both Moneca Stori (Gundam Wing) (until episode 13) and then Cathy Weseluck from episode 35 til the end of the series (Endless Waltz) in English.
Hilde Schbeiker (ヒルデ・シュバイカー, Hirude Shubaikā) [W, BP, EW]
Hilde was a volunteer soldier of the OZ Space Army, who signed up with the organization shortly after they made their move for space. Soon after joining, she attempted to recruit Duo Maxwell, discovering rather suddenly that he was a Gundam pilot. Some time after Duo's capture, Hilde quit OZ and became an artist, letting Duo stay in her apartment after he escaped from OZ. When White Fang rose up, Hilde broke into Libra to steal data on the mobile dolls and met Relena. During her escape, Hilde was attacked by mobile doll versions of the OZ-13MSX1 Vayeate and OZ-13MSX2 Mercurius and was almost killed, when Duo came to her rescue. She and Duo are never explicitly said to be a couple, but many of their actions (such as Duo being away in Battlefield of Pacifists because he got on Hilde's nerves, and later calling to apologize) suggest that this may be a possibility. Hilde appeared again at the end of Endless Waltz, working at her scrapyard with Duo. Hilde Schbeiker was given voice by Kae Araki in Japanese and Marcy Goldberg in English.
Vice Foreign Minister Darlian (ドーリアン外務次官, Dōrian-gaimujikan) [EZ, W]
Relena's adoptive father, Darlian was once the right-hand man of the Peacecraft family. When the Sanc Kingdom was invaded, he took Relena to safety, and adopted her as his own daughter. As tensions between Earth and the colonies rose, Darlian advocated peace with the oppressed colonies, even while the Alliance sought tighter control. Somehow, Darlian learned the truth of Operation Meteor, and became a target of Dekim Barton, only to be saved by the young Heero Yuy. He wouldn't be so lucky later on, when OZ's Lady Une threw a bomb into a room he was occupying for a meeting, mortally wounding Darlian and killing everyone else. As he died, Darlian told Relena the truth about her parents.
Master Long Shirin (竜 紫鈴, Ron Shirin; Pinyin: Lóng Zǐlíng) [EZ, W, EW]
The head of the Long Clan and formal leader of colony A02026. His granddaughter Meilan was married to Chang Wufei, making him related to the future Gundam pilot in a way. When Operation Meteor's true form was revealed, it was planned for A02026 to be the colony dropped on the Earth, an action that Wufei greatly opposed. Before the brash young man could leave, Shirin gave him the clan's heirloom, a jade statue of their guardian, the two-headed dragon Altron, to sell for supplies. In the series, Wufei returns to the colony after receiving the Altron Gundam to rediscover his purpose. When OZ attacked A02026 to root out the Gundam, Shirin activates the colony's self-destruct system to keep his people out of OZ's hands, and to give Wufei a reminder of what he's fighting for.
Long Meilan (竜 妹蘭, Ron Meiran; Pinyin: Lóng Mèilán) [EZ]
The granddaughter of Master Long Shirin, the spirited and tomboyish Meilan was wed to Chang Wufei in AC 194. The two didn't get along at all, with practically opposite personalities and philosophies. Wufei especially angered Meilan with his insistence that justice wasn't real. In response to the sexist attitude displayed by many of her male peers, Meilan insisted on being called Nataku, after a guardian warrior god. Later that year, Colony A02026 came under attack by the Alliance, with the intent of purging the aging colony. Taking the Prototype Leo (the Tallgeese) Master O had in his collection, Meilan fought off the Alliance Leos, despite the toll the machine took on her body. When Wufei tried to come to her rescue in the incomplete Shenlong Gundam, Meiran took an attack meant for him, which mortally wounded her. With the Alliance in retreat, Wufei took Meilan back to his favorite field of flowers, where she died peacefully in his arms.
Odin Lowe (アディン・ロウ, Adin Rō) [EZ]
A former member of OZ and a professional assassin, Odin Lowe was the mentor to the boy who would become the Gundam pilot Heero Yuy. It is unknown exactly how long the two had been together, but flashbacks suggest that it was quite a long time (Heero is shown to be about four or five in several scenes). In AC 187, Lowe was hired by Dekim Barton to kill General Septem of the Alliance; however, this was simply a plot by Dekim to get his revenge on Lowe, who was actually the assassin of the original Heero Yuy. Lowe taught his young ward how to survive on his own and fight, but the most important lesson he gave the child was to live by his emotions, saying that "you never know when some idiot will come along and change the world". Even as he died, Lowe reminded the child of this philosophy, leaving him alone with the remainder of his mission.
Father Maxwell (マックスウェル神父, Makkusuweru-shinpi) [EZ, EW]
The priest in charge of the Maxwell Church, Father Maxwell handled the adoptions of the orphan children whom the Alliance caught. All the children were adopted except for young Duo, who chose to stay at the church under the watchful eyes of the Father and Sister Helen. Father Maxwell was very accommodating, allowing Duo to say or do most anything, simply saying "Boys will be boys." His honest hope was that the child would grow up to become the greatest priest in the Earth Sphere. A group of rebels decided to hole up in the church to avoid the Alliance. Duo offered to steal a mobile suit for them, and thus was out of the church when the Alliance attacked. Father Maxwell was killed, and Sister Helen, as she died, told Duo that up until his last breath, Father Maxwell continued expounding on Heero Yuy's philosophy of non-violence.
Sister Helen (シスター・ヘレン, Shisutā Heren) [EZ, EW]
A kindly nun, Sister Helen worked at the Maxwell Church and helped take care of Duo. When the youth refused to cut his long hair, Sister Helen braided it for him, a style which Duo keeps to this day. Though she admonished him for still thinking like he was an orphan, and some of his stranger actions surprised her, she still treated him with love and respect. One day, a group of rebels hid in the church and Duo offered to steal a Leo for them, but while he was away, the Alliance destroyed the church, killing everyone inside. Duo found the fatally wounded Sister Helen, who expressed her motherly love for him one last time before dying.
Solo (ソロ, Soro) [EZ, EW]
Solo was the leader of a group of orphans living on colony V08744. In AC 187, a virus broke out on the colony, but the vaccine was reserved for the rich. When Solo contracted the virus, his best friend sneaked into an Alliance base to steal the vaccine. He was too late, and Solo died, but the vaccine was given to the other orphans. Solo's friend, who never contracted the virus despite never receiving the vaccine, attributed it to his friend's protection, and named himself "Duo" in honor of his fallen friend, who had told him that they would always be together.
Middie Une (ミディー・アン, Midī An) [EZ]
A young civilian girl, Middie was picked up by a group of mercenaries because she was apparently orphaned. She served as the group's cook, forming a bond with a nameless soldier who was about the same age. As a present, she gave him a cross and told him that God would protect him. However, it was soon revealed that Middie was actually an Alliance spy, and had sold the mercenaries out in return for the money to take care of her sick father and brothers (the cross she gave No-Name was a transmitter). She was attracted to No-Name, but didn't truly realize her feelings until after he was gone.
Iria Winner (イリア・ウィナー, Iria Winā) [W]
One of Quatre's twenty-nine test-tube baby older sisters. Iria works as a doctor on a Winner Corporation mining satellite. She took care of Quatre when he returned to space, and eventually brought him back to their father, Zayeed. When OZ attacked Zayeed, her and Quatre's shuttle was knocked off balance, causing Iria to hit her head, apparently knocking her out. She does not appear for the rest of the series.
Katherine Winner (カトリーヌ・ウィナー, Katorīnu Winā) [EZ]
Zayeed's wife and the mother of Quatre. Due to complications arising from natural birth in space, most colonists were test-tube babies. Though these complications were eventually corrected, the Winner family had been in space all along and still possessed them. Despite this, Katherine insisted on bearing her husband's son naturally. Though the birth was successful, it cost Katherine her life. Choosing not to burden his son with the guilt of his mother's death, Zayeed told Quatre that he was a test-tube baby like his sisters, which fostered resentment in the young man for quite some time.
Zayeed Winner (ザイード・ウィナー, Zaīdo Winā) [EZ, W]
Quatre's father and the head of the Winner Corporation. Like many people, he adopted Heero Yuy's philosophy of absolute pacifism, believing that violence only begets more violence. As a result of this, a rift formed between him and his son when he learned that Quatre was a Gundam pilot. Zayeed refused to sell out to OZ, even when his employees wished to do so, and he ended up being killed in defiance.
Heero Yuy (politician) (油井 緋色, Yui Hiiro; Hiiro Yui in the original Japanese version) [EZ]
A colonial diplomat, the charismatic Heero Yuy soon became the representative for all the colonies in the Alliance. He won popularity thanks to his desire for colonial independence and his philosophy of absolute pacifism. His message gained so much support that OZ had Odin Lowe assassinate him on April 7, AC175. In the chaos following his death, Alliance control on the colonies tightens and the designers of OZ's Tallgeese mobile suit, who later became the Gundam scientists, resigned in protest.
Madam L / Louisa Lovecraft (マダムL/ルイーザ・ラヴクラフト, Madamu Eru / Ruīza Ravukurafuto) [SY]
An eccentric engineer who created the Lemming, a mobile suit with performance levels nearing those of a Gundam. The Lemming's main feature, the Lemming System, affects the mind of anyone within its effect radius, forcing them into a kind of berserker rage. Madam L apparently cared more about research than family, since she allowed her daughter Sei to pilot the dangerous machine, which cost Sei her life.
Sei (セイ) [SY]
A young woman who had a chance encounter with Duo Maxwell at the colonies one day. What he didn't realize is that Sei's mother, Madam L, is an engineer who had designed the deadly and powerful Lemming mobile suit. During a test flight of the Lemming, Sei is killed by its special Lemming System.
Adodera Gloria (アドデラ・グローリア, Adodera Gurōria) [SY]
The test pilot of the Lemming following Sei's death. During her flight, she encountered Duo, who had borrowed the Wing Gundam Zero to destroy the machine. The ensuing battle led the two into space, where the Lemming System affected Adodera's mind to the point where she opened the cockpit hatch without wearing a helmet, killing herself.
Tiel Noembleux (ティエル・ノンブルー, Tieru Nonburū) [TI]
A 14-year-old choir girl and the protagonist of Tiel's Impulse. Her older brother was an OZ test pilot who was driven mad by the Gundam Lucifer's ZERO System Ver 2.0. In order to find him, she came up with the plan to sneak into the colony where Romefeller built their mass production Gundams, all under the auspices of a choral performance. During the Gundamjack, she stole the Wing Gundam Seraphim, whose ZERO System Ver 2.5 would be used to help her track down her older brother. However, the race to find her brother results in her losing her two best friends before finally encountering him. When she finds her older brother, he is completely mad, thanks to the ZERO System; when his sister refused to join him, the two fought and ended up falling into the Earth's atmosphere, dying in the process.

== Cast ==
Character	Japanese voice actor	English voice actor
Heero Yuy	Hikaru Midorikawa	Mark Hildreth
Relena Peacecraft	Akiko Yajima	Lisa Ann Beley
Duo Maxwell	Toshihiko Seki	Scott McNeil
Trowa Barton	Shigeru Nakahara	Kirby Morrow
Quatre Raberba Winner	Ai Orikasa	Brad Swaile
Chang Wufei	Ryuuzou Ishino	Ted Cole
Zechs Merquise	Takehito Koyasu	Brian Drummond
Treize Khushrenada	Ryotaro Okiayu	David Kaye
Lucrezia Noin	Chisa Yokoyama	Saffron Henderson
Lady Une	Sayuri Yamauchi	Enuka Okuma
Sally Po	Yumi Touma	Moneca Stori/Samantha Ferris
Catherine Bloom	Saori Suzuki	Moneca Stori/Cathy Weseluck
Hilde Schbeiker	Kae Araki	Marcy Goldberg
Dorothy Catalonia	Naoko Matsui	Cathy Weseluck
Doctor J	Minoru Inaba	Don Brown
Howard	Hiroshi Ishida	Ward Perry
Narrator	Akio Ōtsuka	Campbell Lane
