= Heero Yuy =

Fictional character from Mobile Suit Gundam Wing

- Mobile Suit Gundam Wing character
- First appearance: Mobile Suit Gundam Wing episode 1
- Designed by: Shūkō Murase
- Voiced by: Hikaru Midorikawa (Japanese); Mark Hildreth (English)

In-universe information
- Family: Aoi Clark (mother); Odin Lowe (stepfather); Seis Clark (stepbrother)
- Significant others: Relena Darlian (fiancée, [Frozen Teardrop])
- Nationality: L1 Colony

Heero Yuy (Japanese: ヒイロ・ユイ, Hepburn: Hīro Yui) is a fictional character from Mobile Suit Gundam Wing and is the protagonist's codename. In the same work, the codename's origin appears throughout the work as "the leader's legend", (Note: 伝説の指導者 (Densetsu no shidōsha)) but his codename would be stolen from a politician also named Heero Yuy. He is the pilot of the titular Wing Gundam and its ancestor, the Wing Gundam Zero. He is voiced by Hikaru Midorikawa in Japanese and Mark Hildreth in English.

== Concept and creation ==
Sunrise staff decided to have a character who wore a tank top and short pants. According to Hideyuki Tomioka, Shūkō Murase designed the character in a detailed and delicate manner. Heero Yuy is modeled after Yuki Uchida.

== Appearances ==
Heero Yuy is the teenage pilot of Wing Gundam. His father worked for the Organization of the Zodiac (OZ), an organization that would seek to control the Sphere Alliance and related colonies. His name was also stolen from a politician named Heero Yuy, and he was raised by his mother and stepfather. His mother, Aoi Clark, would raise him with his stepbrother, Seis Clark, but Aoi and Seis would die. Because of this, Odin teaches Heero how to live independently. Heero is the first character to successfully use the Zero System. At times, Heero tries to kill himself. When Doctor J surrenders, Heero tries to detonate the Wing Gundam, but he survives.

=== New Mobile Report Gundam Wing: Frozen Teardrop ===
In New Mobile Report Gundam Wing: Frozen Teardrop, decades after Gundam Wing: Endless Waltz, Heero Yuy enters a cryogenic sleep, but wakes up as a boy. After the Martian Civil War, Heero rejects his codename Heero Yuy and chooses to return to the name he had as a boy. He sends a letter proposing to Relena Darlian, and the two marry.

=== Other appearances ===
Heero Yuy appears in Mobile Suit Gundam: Extreme Vs., Gundam Battle Assault 2, Battle Assault 3 Featuring Gundam SEED, games in the Dynasty Warriors: Gundam series, and various games in the Super Robot Wars series. Hikaru Midorikawa reprises his role in each video game, Louis Chirillo portrays Heero in the English dubs of the first and second Dynasty Warriors: Gundam games, and Brian Drummond portrays Heero in Dynasty Warriors: Gundam 3.

== Reception ==
Critics had mixed opinions of Heero Yuy's portrayal. Matthew Wilkinson-Swafford of Comic Book Resources stated that compared to Shinji Ikari of Neon Genesis Evangelion, Heero is superior and more direct about performance. According to Misael Duran, another writer for Comic Book Resources, Heero exemplifies aesthetics believed to be edgy and cool, as these aesthetics show in Mobile Suit Gundam Wing, but he did not believe Heero was well-written and said he was bland. Sage Ashford, also of Comic Book Resources, said that Heero is a "bad guy" because of his plans to kill everyone he meets, such as pacifists. Ashford said that he is why "OZ can declare war on the colonies", and much of Mobile Suit Gundam Wing involves stopping what Heero started.
