= Shigeru Nakahara =

Japanese voice actor

- 中原 茂
- Born: January 22, 1961 (age 65); Kamakura, Kanagawa, Japan
- Occupation: Voice actor
- Years active: 1982–present
- Notable credits: Dragon Ball series as Android 17; Mobile Suit Gundam Wing as Trowa Barton; Aura Battler Dunbine as Sho Zama

Shigeru Nakahara (中原 茂, Nakahara Shigeru; born January 22, 1961) is a Japanese voice actor. A former member of Arts Vision, Sigma Seven, and Vi-Vo, he is affiliated with Local Dream.

== Voice roles ==
- Acrobunch (Jun Rando - debut role, 1982)
- Another Century's Episode 2 (Sho Zama), (Trowa Barton)
- Aoki Densetsu Shoot! (Hiroshi Matsushita)
- Arion (Arion)
- Aura Battler Dunbine (Sho Zama)
- Biker Mice from Mars (Vinnie)
- Bondage Queen Kate (Jenkins)
- Bosco Adventure (Frog)
- Brave Police J-Decker (Kagerou)
- Captain Tsubasa (Mamoru Izawa), (Taichi Nakanishi),
- Dancouga - Super Beast Machine God (Masato Shikibu)
- Darker than Black (Nick Hillman)
- Digimon Xros Wars (Gravimon)
- Dogs: Bullets & Carnage (Giovanni)
- Domain of Murder (Goro Nanase)
- Dragon Ball GT (Android 17 / Hell Fighter 17 / Super 17)
- Dragon Ball Super (Android 17)
- Dragon Ball Z (Android 17)
- Dragon Ball Z Kai (Android 17)
- Gundam Wing (Trowa Barton)
- Harukanaru Toki no Naka de (Ten no Byakko (Fujiwara no Takamichi, Fujiwara no Yukitaka, Arikawa Yuzuru)
- Harukanaru Toki no Naka de4~Ame sora no shou~video games as Chi no Genbu Katsuragi Oshihito
- Hello! Lady Lynn (Arthur Drake Brighton)
- Ressha Sentai ToQger (Bottle Shadow)
- Romeo's Blue Skies (Rinaldo)
- Legend of the Galactic Heroes (Franz Varlimont)
- Otaku no Video (Hino)
- Police Academy: The Animated Series (Proctor)
- Saint Seiya (Megrez Delta Alberich, Black Pegasus, Pavo Shiva, and Shô (Steel Saint of Toucan))
- Saint Seiya Omega (Kiki and Shô (Steel Saint of Toucan))
- Sengoku Basara (Mouri Motonari)
- Shin Captain Tsubasa (Shun Nitta)
- Tales of Graces (Lambda)
- Tekkaman Blade (Rebin)
- Wandaba Style (Kōsaku Tsukomo)
- YuYu Hakusho (Yoko Kurama)

=== Drama CD ===
- GFantasy Comic CD Collection Fire Emblem: Ankoku Ryū to Hikari no Ken (Marth)
  - Vol．1 Yakusoku no Totihe
  - Vol．2 Honoo no Monsyou
  - Vol．3 Kaze no Kiseki
  - Vol．4 Madou no Seiiki
- 110 Ban wa Koi no Hajimari series 2: Ban wa Koi no Hajimari (Toshiyuki Tsukidate)
- Amai Tsumi no Kakera (Satoshi Katsuragawa)
- Ambassador wa Yoru ni Sasayaku (Professor Domyoji)
- Ao no Kiseki series 1: Ao no Kiseki (Kai)
- Ao no Kiseki series 2: Catharsis Spell (Kai)
- Ao no Kiseki series 3: Crystal Crown (Kai)
- Ao no Kiseki series 4: Baroque Pearl (Kai/Ishisu)
- Ao no Kiseki series 5: Persona Non Grata (Kai)
- Ao no Kiseki series 6: Phantom Pain (Kai)
- Catch Me! (Shouji Toukai)
- Chinmoku no Ookami (Osada)
- Convenience Store Lamento (Shui)
- Deep Fear Sound Drama (John Mayor)
- Eien no Midori ~Nochinoomohini~ (Yuuta Takeuchi)
- Endless Series 2: Endless Kiss (Rei Sakuma)
- Endless Series side story: Kekkon Shiyouyo (Rei Sakuma)
- Gohan wo Tabeyou series 5 (Sakagami)
- Hameteyaru! (Tsukasa Nakamura)
- Kimi ga Suki Nanosa (Kimiaki Yoshida)
- Lamento ~Rhapsody to the Past~ (Shui)
- Open Sesame (Shumon Aida)
- Stanley Hawk no Jikenbo ~AMBIVALENCE . Katto~ (Lewis)
- Wagamama Prisoner (Satoshi Renjou)

=== Dubbing ===
==== Live-action ====
- Beverly Hills, 90210 (Brandon Walsh (Jason Priestley))
- BH90210 (Jason Priestley/Brandon Walsh)
- The Cave (Jack McAllister (Cole Hauser))
- The Doors (Robby Krieger (Frank Whaley))
- Friends (Mike Hannigan (Paul Rudd))
- The Thin Red Line (Cpl. Geoffrey Fife (Adrien Brody))
- Village of the Damned (Frank McGowan (Michael Paré))

==== Animation ====
- TUGS (Ten Cents)
