= Gundam Wing: Endless Waltz =

Japanese mecha anime series

- Endless Waltz DVD cover, featuring the redesigned Wing Gundam Zero designed by Hajime Katoki

新機動戦記ガンダムW Endless Waltz (New Mobile Report Gundam Wing: Endless Waltz)
- Genre: Military science fiction Mecha
- Created by: Hajime Yatate; Yoshiyuki Tomino
- Original video animation
- Directed by: Yasunao Aoki
- Produced by: Atsushi Yukawa; Hideyuki Tomioka
- Written by: Katsuyuki Sumisawa
- Music by: Kow Otani
- Studio: Sunrise
- Licensed by: NA: Sunrise
- Released: January 25, 1997 – July 25, 1997
- Runtime: 25 minutes (each)
- Episodes: 3
- Anime film

Special Edition
- Directed by: Yasunao Aoki
- Studio: Sunrise
- Licensed by: NA: Sunrise
- Released: August 1, 1998
- Runtime: 90 minutes
- Manga
- Written by: Kōichi Tokita
- Published by: Kodansha
- English publisher: NA: Tokyopop
- Magazine: Comic Bom Bom
- Original run: March 1998 – July 1998
- Volumes: 1
- Manga

Glory of the Losers
- Written by: Katsuyuki Sumizawa
- Illustrated by: Hajime Katoki; Tomofumi Ogasawara
- Published by: Kadokawa Shoten
- English publisher: NA: Vertical
- Magazine: Gundam Ace
- Original run: September 25, 2010 – November 25, 2017
- Volumes: 14

Gundam Wing: Endless Waltz (Japanese: 新機動戦記ガンダムW(ウイング) Endless Waltz, Hepburn: Shin Kidō Senki Gandamu Uingu Endoresu Warutsu; lit. 'New Mobile Report Gundam Wing: Endless Waltz'), is the sequel to Mobile Suit Gundam Wing, both of which are set in the "After Colony" timeline, an alternate universe to that of the original Mobile Suit Gundam series. Aside from being a continuation to the Gundam Wing TV series, it also reveals details regarding the pasts of the five Gundam pilots and the true objective behind "Operation Meteor."

Endless Waltz originally premiered in Japan as a three-part direct-to-video OVA in 1997. It was later released as a theatrical compilation film in 1998, including additional scenes and an altered musical score. Endless Waltz later was released in theaters in Japan as a compilation of the first three OVAs on August 1, 1998. The English dub produced by Ocean Productions and Bandai Entertainment first aired on September 11, 2000 on YTV in Canada and on November 10, 2000 on Cartoon Network's Toonami block in the United States.

== Synopsis ==
It is the year After Colony 196, and the battles between Earth and the space colonies have ended. Treize Khushrenada is dead and the Organization of the Zodiac (OZ) has come to an end. This gives birth to the Earth Sphere Unified Nation (ESUN) and the Preventers. Seeing they won't be needed anymore, the Gundam pilots (except Chang Wufei) send their suits into the sun. However, this peace would not last, as a rebellion occurs on the newly completed colony, L3 X-18999.

Led by seven-year-old Mariemaia Khushrenada, Treize's illegitimate daughter, the rebellion kidnaps Relena Darlian, now the Vice Foreign Minister of the ESUN, during a diplomatic mission to X-18999. As the Gundam pilots investigate further, they discover that Mariemaia is merely a puppet controlled by her grandfather Dekim Barton, a former advisor to martyred colony leader Heero Yuy who is using X-18999 to go through with the original Operation Meteor as a contingency plan in case the ESUN doesn't comply. The Gundam pilots must prevent Dekim from seizing power over the ESUN.

The Gundams are retrieved from their course to sun to Earth's orbit thanks to Quatre and the Maganacs. The pilots use their Gundams one last time to fight against Dekim's forces, not killing anyone. In the end, Dekim is killed by one of his own soldiers, Earth and its colonies are at peace once again and all mobile suits (including the Gundams) are forever destroyed and never seen again.

== Characters ==
Heero Yuy
Voiced by: Hikaru Midorikawa (Japanese); Mark Hildreth (English)
Pilot of the XXXG-00W0 Wing Gundam Zero, who was code-named after the assassinated pacifist of the same name. Though he brought an end to the war between Earth and the colonies, Heero must now prevent the Mariemaia Army from disrupting the peace.
Relena Darlian
Voiced by: Akiko Yajima (Japanese); Lisa Ann Beley (English)
An ally of the Gundam pilots and the strongest political advocate for peace between Earth and the colonies, who is kidnapped by the Mariemaia Army.
Duo Maxwell
Voiced by: Toshihiko Seki (Japanese); Scott McNeil (English)
Pilot of the XXXG-01D2 Gundam Deathscythe Hell, who assists his fellow Gundam pilots in maintaining the peace they fought so hard to attain.
Trowa Barton
Voiced by: Shigeru Nakahara (Japanese); Kirby Morrow (English)
Pilot of the XXXG-01H2 Gundam Heavyarms Kai, who infiltrates the Mariemaia Army in order to prevent its revised version of Operation Meteor.
Quatre Raberba Winner
Voiced by: Ai Orikasa (Japanese); Brad Swaile (English)
Pilot of the XXXG-01SR2 Gundam Sandrock Kai, who comes up with the idea of sending the Gundams into the Sun, but is forced to retrieve them after the Mariemaia Army declares war on Earth.
Chang Wufei
Voiced by: Ryuuzou Ishino (Japanese); Ted Cole (English)
Pilot of the XXXG-01S2 Altron Gundam, who joins forces with the Mariemaia Army and becomes an enemy toward the other Gundam pilots.
Zechs Merquise
Voiced by: Takehito Koyasu (Japanese); Brian Drummond (English)
A former enemy of the Gundam pilots, now their ally and a member of the Preventers (code name: "Wind"), as well as the pilot of the new OZ-00MS2B Tallgeese III mobile suit.
Lucrezia Noin
Voiced by: Chisa Yokoyama (Japanese); Saffron Henderson (English)
An ally of the Gundam pilots and a member of the Preventers (code name: "Fire").
Sally Po
Voiced by: Yumi Touma (Japanese); Samantha Ferris (English)
Another ally of the Gundam pilots and a member of the Preventers (code name: "Water").
Lady Une
Voiced by: Sayuri Yamauchi (Japanese); Enuka Okuma (English)
Another former enemy of the Gundam pilots, now their ally and the head of the Preventers (code name: "Gold").
Mariemaia Khushrenada
Voiced by: Rei Sakuma (Japanese); Maggie Blue O'Hara (English)
The young daughter of the deceased Treize Khushrenada and Leia Barton, who is manipulated by her grandfather Dekim Barton into leading a rebellion against the Earth with the intentions of conquering it.
Narrator
Voiced by: Akio Ōtsuka (Japanese); Campbell Lane (English)

== Mecha redesigns ==
One of the most notable features of Endless Waltz was the massive redesigns all five of the Gundams from the end of the Gundam Wing TV series received, courtesy of the artist Hajime Katoki. The Gundams in Endless Waltz have more stylized appearances, reflected in the even more demonic design of the Gundam Deathscythe Hell, the more dragon-like design of the Altron Gundam, and the new "angel-winged" design of the Wing Gundam Zero. Despite the dramatically different designs of the Gundams, the story in Endless Waltz retcons them as if the original designs from the TV series never existed. However, this changed after the release of the Glory of Losers manga series.

== Music ==
=== Theme songs ===
- OVA Ending Theme: "White Reflection" by Two-Mix
- Movie Ending Theme: "Last Impression" by Two-Mix

== Distribution ==
In North America, Endless Waltz premiered on Canada's YTV on September 11, 2000 and on Cartoon Network in the U.S. on November 10, 2000. It was later released to VHS, UMD, and DVD by Bandai Entertainment, with the DVD edition containing both the OVA and compilation film versions on one disc. Due to the closure of Bandai Entertainment, the OVA and film went out-of-print. On October 11, 2014, at their 2014 New York Comic Con panel, Sunrise announced they will be releasing all of the Gundam franchise, including Endless Waltz in North America though distribution from Right Stuf Inc., beginning in Spring 2015. Right Stuf had re-released Endless Waltz on Blu-ray and DVD in December 2017.

In Australia, a special 4K theatrical release through Sugoi Co was held at Hoyts Broadway as part of the GUNDAM BASE Pop-Up World Tour on October 2, 2025, alongside re-releases of Mobile Suit Gundam SEED Freedom and Mobile Suit Gundam GQuuuuuuX -The Beginning..

== Reception ==
The initial airing of the OVA on November 10, 2000, was Cartoon Network's second highest-rated program ever at the time, only being topped by the Funimation in-house dub premiere of Dragon Ball Z. Helen McCarthy in 500 Essential Anime Movies commented that "the giant robot fights are as good as ever" and that "the art direction and design is excellent".

Preceded by After War Gundam X	Gundam metaseries (production order); 1997	Succeeded by ∀ Gundam
Preceded by Mobile Suit Gundam Wing	Gundam After Colony timeline AC 196	Succeeded by New Mobile Report Gundam Wing: Frozen Teardrop
