= Mark Hildreth (actor) =

Canadian actor (born 1978)

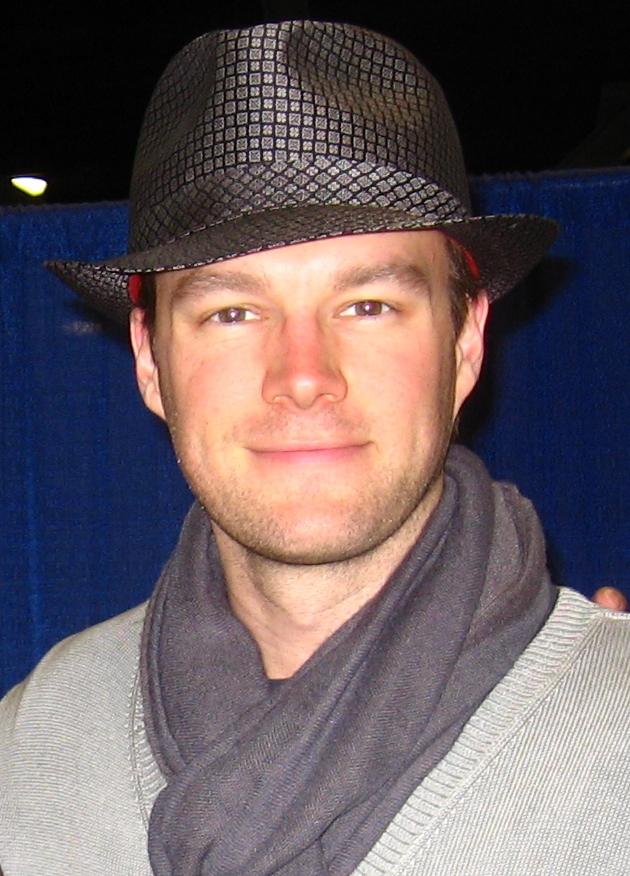
- Hildreth in 2009
- Born: January 24, 1978 (age 48); Vancouver, British Columbia, Canada
- Occupations: Actor, singer
- Years active: 1985–present
- Website: mark-hildreth.com

Mark Hildreth (born January 24, 1978) is a Canadian actor and singer, appearing in movie and television roles. A graduate of the National Theatre School of Canada, Mark Hildreth's theater credits include Hamlet (The Shakespeare Project), Bertram in All's Well that Ends Well (Bard on the Beach), Richard of Gloucester in Richard III (NTSC) and Cale Blackwell in Fire (Teatre Lac Brome). He also starred as Pastor Tom Hale in the ABC drama Resurrection.

== Life and career ==
Active as an actor since 1986, Hildreth has provided voiceovers since the age of 10, when he was cast as the voice of Beany in DiC Entertainment's production of Beany and Cecil. Since then, major roles have included: Caz in The New Adventures of He-Man, Alex Mann in Action Man; Hi-Tech in the direct-to-video CGI animated movies G.I. Joe: Spy Troops and G.I. Joe: Valor vs. Venom; Quicksilver in Wolverine and the X-Men; Terry Bogard in the Fatal Fury series; Oberon in A Midsummer Night's Dream; Harrison in Stargate: Infinity; and Heero Yuy in Gundam Wing.

He provided voices for enemy soldiers for the video game Metal Gear Solid 4: Guns of the Patriots, and for the character DJ Atomika in SSX 3, SSX Blur, SSX (2012 video game), and Burnout Paradise.

Hildreth also appears in stage productions: In 2001, Hildreth played the role of Eugene Marchbanks in the Vancouver Playhouse production of George Bernard Shaw's Candida, for which he received a Jessie Richardson award for best performance by an actor in a leading role.

In 2003, he joined the band Davis Trading as a keyboardist and singer. Hildreth left Davis Trading in 2004 to go solo; he formed his own band with guitarist Jory Neal Groberman and drummer Amrit Basi. He writes and sings all original music. In 2008, he released an album titled "Complex State of Attachment." In December 2012, he released his second album, "Signs of Life".

He appeared in the ABC-TV series V as Joshua, and Cartoon Network's Hot Wheels Battle Force 5 as Vert Wheeler.

== Personal life ==
Hildreth was a member of NXIVM, a now-defunct self-improvement organisation widely described as a cult. Hildreth was in a long-term relationship with actress Kristin Kreuk and reportedly introduced Kreuk to NXIVM, which she joined in 2006. Hildreth left NXIVM and subsequently disavowed the group in 2021, clarifying his participation in its personal development courses and unawareness of its criminal activities, calling them "a horrendous betrayal of trust." Hildreth's statement was later confirmed by NXIVM whistleblower Sarah Edmondson in a reply to his X/Twitter post.

== Filmography ==
=== Film ===
Year	Title	Role	Notes
1986	The Humanoid	Eric	
1994	Fatal Fury: Legend of the Hungry Wolf	Terry Bogard (voice)	English dub
1995	Fatal Fury 2: The New Battle	Terry Bogard (voice)	English dub
1995	Fatal Fury: The Motion Picture	Terry Bogard (voice)	English dub
1996	Past Perfect	Rusty Walker	
2002	Barbie as Rapunzel	Prince Stefan (voice)	Direct-to-video
2002	They	Troy	
2003	G.I. Joe: Spy Troops	Hi-Tech (voice)	
2003	Barbie of Swan Lake	Prince Daniel (voice)	Direct-to-video
2004	My Scene: Masquerade Madness	Sutton, Brett, Male Model (voice)	
2004	My Scene: Jammin' in Jamaica	Sutton, Tyson (voice)	
2004	Everyone	Grant	
2004	G.I. Joe: Valor vs. Venom	Hi-Tech (voice)	
2004	Barbie as the Princess and the Pauper	King Dominick (voice)	Direct-to-video
2004	Dragons: Fire and Ice	Dev (voice)	Direct-to-video
2005	Barbie and the Magic of Pegasus	Aidan (voice)	Direct-to-video
2005	My Scene Goes Hollywood: The Movie	Sutton (voice)	
2006	Eighteen	Macauley	
2007	Pirates of the Caribbean: At World's End	Cryer	
2009	Barbie and the Three Musketeers	Prince Louis (voice)	Direct-to-video
2009	Sing Along with Barbie		
2010	Planet Hulk	Red King (voice)	Direct-to-video
2011	Max Steel: Makino's Revenge	Max Steel, Pedestrian (voice)	
2012	Max Steel: Monstrous Alliance	Max Steel (voice)	

=== Television ===
Year	Title	Role	Notes
1985	Love Is Never Silent	Bradley Ryder	Television film
1987	The New Adventures of Beans Baxter	Beazle	Episode: "Beans in Jungleland"
1987	After the Promise	Young Raymond	Television film
1988	The New Adventures of Beany and Cecil	Beany (voice)	Main cast (5 episodes)
1990–1991	The New Adventures of He-Man	Caz (voice)	Main cast (65 episodes)
1991	My Son Johnny	Young Johnny	Television film
1992–1994	The Odyssey	Finger, Mick	23 episodes
1992–1993	King Arthur and the Knights of Justice	Zeke, Everett (voice)	Main cast (26 episodes)
1993–1994	The Bots Master	Ziv Zulander (voice)	Main cast (40 episodes)
1993–1994	Kishin Corps	Jack (voice)	English dub
1993	Relentless: Mind of a Killer	Jeremy	Television film
1994	Madison	Allan	2 episodes
1995	Shock Treatment	Craig Grant	Television film
1995	Hawkeye	Gabriel	Episode: "Hester"
1995–1997	Street Fighter	Various voices	
1996	Please Save My Earth	Issei Nishikiori (voice)	English dub
1996–1997	Dragon Ball Z	Dr. Briefs (voice)	English dub (Ocean Productions)
1998–2000	Honey, I Shrunk the Kids: The TV Show	Jack McKenna	5 episodes
1999	Hope Island	Mark	Episode: "Each Tub Must Stand on Its Own Bottom"
1999	Y2K	Young Soldier	Television film
2000	Level 9	Raymo	Episode: "Digital Babylon"
2000	Call of the Wild	Stanton	5 episodes
2000	Mobile Suit Gundam Wing	Heero Yuy (voice)	English dub
2001	Wolf Lake	Billy	Episode: "Pilot"; uncredited
2001	UC: Undercover	Danny	Episode: "Zero Option"
2001	Night Visions	Tim	Episode: "Rest Stop"
2001–2003	X-Men: Evolution	Warren Worthington III / Angel (voice)	3 episodes
2002	Andromeda	Brendan Lahey (voice)	Episode: "Bunker Hill"
2002	No Night Is Too Long	James Gilman	
2002–2003	Just Cause	Ted Kasselbaum	20 episodes
2002–2003	Stargate Infinity	R.J. Harrison	26 episodes
2003	Taken	Lt. Wiley	Episode: "High Hopes"; uncredited
2004	Earthsea	Jasper	2 episodes
2005	The Collector	Sickert	Episode: "The Ripper"
2005	Young Blades	Siroc	2 episodes
2005–2006	Krypto the Superdog	Thundermutt, Barney, Canus Magnus Patrol Dog (voice)	3 episodes
2006–2007	This Space for Rent	River Sorenson	
2006–2007	Class of the Titans	Pan (voice)	2 episodes
2008	Eureka	Chuck	Episode: "Phased and Confused"
2009	Wolverine and the X-Men	Quicksilver (voice)	9 episodes
2009	Supernatural	Adam Benson	Episode: "Sex and Violence"
2009	Being Erica	Mr. Leeds	Episode: "Dr. Tom"
2009	The Tudors	Reginald Pole	5 episodes
2009–2011	V	Joshua	17 episodes
2009–2011	Hot Wheels Battle Force 5	Vert Wheeler, Kyrosys, Praxion (voice)	Main cast
2011–2012	Voltron Force	King Lotor, Crew Member (voice)	15 episodes
2013	End of the World	Max	Television film
2013–2015	Resurrection	Tom Hale	21 episodes
2014	Hulk and the Agents of S.M.A.S.H.	Deathlok (voice)	Episode: "Deathlok"
2015	Transformers: Robots in Disguise	Scowl, Announcer (voice)	Episode: "Similarly Different"
2018–2020	The Hollow	Weird Guy (voice)	12 episodes
2019	Escaping the Madhouse: The Nellie Bly Story	Bartholomew Driscoll	Television film
2019	The Good Doctor	Jonas Barstow	Episode: "Take My Hands"
2020	Ninjago	Milton Dyer, Game Voice (voice)	5 episodes
2020	Novelmore	Lord Greystone (voice)	Episode: "Inventor, Prince, Warrior, Spy"
2022	The Guava Juice Show	Fight Announcer, Mango Veteran (voice)	Episode: "The Last Star Guava"
2022–2024	The Dragon Prince	Chert (voice)	3 episodes
2023, 2025	Ninjago: Dragons Rising	King Crag-Nor, Arrakore (voice)	6 episodes
2024	Jonny JetBoy	Jason Jones / JetDad (voice)	18 episodes

=== Video games ===
Year	Title	Role	Notes
2003	SSX 3	DJ Atomika	
2005	Dragons II: The Metal Ages	Dev	
2005	Marvel Nemesis: Rise of the Imperfects	Daredevil	
2007	SSX Blur	DJ Atomika	
2007	Company of Heroes: Opposing Fronts	Roy Jones	
2008	Burnout Paradise	DJ Atomika	
2008	Metal Gear Solid 4: Guns of the Patriots	Soldiers	
2009	Dragon Age: Origins	Sten	
2011	Warhammer 40,000: Dawn of War II – Retribution	Imperial Guardsmen, Baneblades	
2012	SSX	DJ Atomika	
2013	The Bureau: XCOM Declassified	William Carter	

== Discography ==
=== Studio albums ===
- Complex State of Attachment (2008)
- Signs of Life (2013)
