= Mobile Suit Gundam Wing =

Japanese mecha anime series

- 新機動戦記ガンダムW(ウイング)
- Type: TV series
- Genre: Mecha; Military science fiction
- Created by: Hajime Yatate; Yoshiyuki Tomino
- Directed by: Masashi Ikeda (eps. 1-26); Shinji Takamatsu (eps. 27-49, uncredited)
- Series composition: Katsuyuki Sumizawa
- Character designers: Shūkō Murase
- Mechanical designers: Kunio Okawara; Hajime Katoki; Jun'ya Ishigaki
- Music by: Kow Otani
- Voices of: Hikaru Midorikawa; Toshihiko Seki; Shigeru Nakahara; Ai Orikasa; Ryuzou Ishino
- Country of origin: Japan
- Original language: Japanese
- No. of episodes: 49 (list of episodes)

Production
- Producers: Yoshiaki Koizumi (TV Asahi); Masuo Ueda (Sunrise); Hideyuki Tomioka (Sunrise)
- Production companies: TV Asahi; Sunrise

Original release
- Network: ANN (TV Asahi)
- Release: April 7, 1995 – March 29, 1996

Related
- Manga
- Illustrated by: Kōichi Tokita
- Published by: Kodansha
- English publisher: NA: Tokyopop
- Magazine: Comic Bom Bom
- Original run: April 1995 – April 1996
- Volumes: 3
- Original video animation

Operation Meteor
- Directed by: Masashi Ikeda
- Studio: Sunrise
- Licensed by: NA: Sunrise; AUS: Madman Entertainment
- Released: April 25, 1996 – October 10, 1996
- Episodes: 4
- Manga

Battlefield of Pacifists
- Illustrated by: Kōichi Tokita
- Published by: Kodansha
- English publisher: NA: Tokyopop
- Magazine: Haoh Magazine
- Published: 1997
- Volumes: 1
- Manga

Episode Zero
- Written by: Katsuyuki Sumizawa
- Illustrated by: Akira Kanbe
- Published by: Gakushukenkyusha
- English publisher: NA: Viz Media
- Magazine: Anime V
- Published: 1997
- Volumes: 1
- Manga

The Last Outpost
- Written by: Kōichi Tokita
- Published by: Kodansha
- English publisher: NA: Tokyopop
- Magazine: Comic Bom Bom
- Original run: September 1997 – April 1998
- Volumes: 3
- Manga

Ground Zero
- Written by: Reku Fuyunagi
- Published by: Kadokawa Shoten
- English publisher: NA: Viz Communications
- Magazine: Monthly Fantasy Deluxe
- Original run: August 1998 – September 1998
- Volumes: 1
- Manga

Blind Target
- Written by: Sakura Asagi
- Published by: Gakushukenkyusha
- English publisher: NA: Viz Communications
- Magazine: Anime V, Looker
- Original run: July 1998 – January 1999
- Volumes: 1
- Manga

Mobile Suit Gundam Wing 0.5 Point Half Preventer-7
- Written by: Katsuyuki Sumizawa
- Illustrated by: Sakura Asagi
- Published by: Kadokawa
- Magazine: Gundam Ace
- Original run: Aug 26, 2025 – present
- Volumes: 1
- Manga

Mobile Suit Gundam Wing × Code Geass: Lelouch of the Rebellion – Minuet Zero
- Written by: Kōjirō Taniguchi
- Illustrated by: Tomofumi Ogasawara
- Published by: Kadokawa
- Magazine: KadoComi
- Original run: July 10, 2026 – present
- Light novel
- Frozen Teardrop

Mobile Suit Gundam Wing (Japanese: 新機動戦記ガンダムW(ウイング), Hepburn: Shin Kidō Senki Gandamu Uingu; lit. 'New Mobile Report Gundam Wing'), is a 1995 Japanese mecha anime series directed by Masashi Ikeda and written by Katsuyuki Sumizawa. It is the sixth installment in the Gundam franchise, taking place in the "After Colony" timeline. As with the original series, the plot of Gundam Wing centers on a war in the future (specifically, the year After Colony 195) between Earth and its orbital colonies in the Earth-Moon system. It follows five teenage pilots of a powerful line of mobile suits who are sent to Earth to wage a guerrilla war against the oppressive United Earth Sphere Alliance. In doing so, they come into conflict with OZ, a secretive branch of the Alliance Military that serve sinister benefactors.

The series aired in Japan on the terrestrial TV Asahi network. It ran for 49 episodes, beginning on April 7, 1995, and ending on March 29, 1996. It received multiple manga adaptations, as well as video games. Four original video animation (OVA) episodes were produced including a retelling of the series, Operation Meteor, and a direct sequel, Endless Waltz. In 2010, Sumizawa started writing the novel Frozen Teardrop, another sequel to the series. While the series fared modestly well in Japan, it found greater success in the United States and helped popularize the Gundam franchise in the West.

On July 25, 2025, a new manga by Sumizawa titled Mobile Suit Gundam Wing 0.5 Point Half Preventer-7 was announced, bridging the events of Endless Waltz and Frozen Teardrop.

== Plot ==
In the distant future, mankind has colonized space, with clusters of space colonies at each of the five Earth-Moon Lagrange points. Down on the Earth, the nations have come together to form the United Earth Sphere Alliance. This Alliance oppresses the colonies with its vast military might. The colonies wishing to be free, joined in a movement headed by the pacifist Heero Yuy. In the year After Colony 175, Yuy is shot dead by an assassin, forcing the colonies to search for other paths to peace. The assassination prompts five disaffected scientists from the Organization of the Zodiac, more commonly referred to as OZ, to turn rogue upon the completion of the mobile suit prototype Tallgeese.

The story of Gundam Wing begins in the year After Colony 195, with the start of "Operation Meteor": the scientists' plan for revenge against OZ. The operation involves five teenage boys, who have each been chosen and trained by each of the five scientists, then sent to Earth independently in extremely advanced mobile suits (one designed by each of the scientists) known as "Gundams" (called such because they are constructed from a rare and astonishingly durable material called Gundanium alloy, which can only be created in outer space). Each Gundam is sent from a different colony, and the pilots are initially unaware of each other's existence.

The series focuses primarily on the five Gundam pilots: Heero Yuy (an alias, not to be confused with the martyred pacifist), Duo Maxwell, Trowa Barton, Quatre Raberba Winner and Chang Wufei. Their mission is to use their Gundams to attack OZ directly, to rid the Alliance of its weapons, and to free the colonies from its oppressive rule. The series also focuses on Relena Peacecraft, heir to the pacifist Sanc Kingdom, who becomes an important political ally to the Gundam pilots (particularly Heero) throughout the series. In addition to these six heroic and antiheroic characters, the series makes use of a large supporting cast of protagonists and antagonists with complex, interconnected storylines.

== Production ==
The making of Gundam Wing was influenced by Mobile Fighter G Gundam with the idea of having five main characters. Originally, the series was meant to be titled Gundam Meteor after "Operation Meteor." Bandai suggested having a Gundam with the ability of transforming into a plane-like form (which led to the creation of the Wing Gundam and its "Bird Mode"). The writers worked together for one week conceptualizing the characters, mobile suits and first 40 episodes. Director Masashi Ikeda reacted to their work comparing it to the first Gundam series, Zeta and G all at once. The series was more focused on drama than mecha, which the staff credits as one of the reasons for the show's popularity within the female demographic.

Writer Katsuyuki Sumizawa expressed difficulties in the making of the story as opposed to his work in novels due to the fact he relayed duties to other members. However, the handling of the five characters was made easy due to the setting. Early sketches of the protagonists by Ikeda were handled by character designer Shūkō Murase. He was cast due to his work with Ikeda in Samurai Troopers. The director wanted the designs to appeal to the female demographic. Originally, Duo Maxwell was set as the protagonist but was replaced by Heero Yuy. The staff members noted Heero was too different from previous Gundam protagonists and were afraid he would be unpopular. The voice casting was more difficult to do than the ones from previous series due to the different atmosphere.

Following the series' ending, the staff members were asked by the studio to make a sequel due to its popularity. Neither Ikeda nor executive producer Hideyuki Tomioka intended to make a sequel for Gundam Wing. However, Sumizawa was bothered by the finale as he felt the series ended abruptly. Tomioka asked Sumizawa if he could write a continuation, which he agreed to do.

== Media ==
=== Anime ===
Gundam Wing was not the first series in the Gundam franchise to be dubbed and distributed in the U.S. (the compilation film version of the original Mobile Suit Gundam, as well as the OVAs War in the Pocket and Stardust Memory, preceded it by about two years), but it is well known as the first Gundam series to be aired on American television. This dub was licensed by Sunrise and the voice work was done by Ocean Productions. The series aired on Cartoon Network's weekday afternoon after-school programming block Toonami, premiering on March 6, 2000. In the first extended promo leading up to the series' premiere, voice actor Peter Cullen narrated the back story, evoking memories of Voltron's opening credits. The promo was said to be so riveting that Bandai decided to use it as the official promo for the series. Gundam Wing was a huge ratings winner for Toonami (often outperforming veteran series such as Dragon Ball Z and Sailor Moon) and became, for a time, not only the highest rated series on Toonami but on all of Cartoon Network.

It was broadcast in two formats: an edited version shown in the daytime on Toonami and an uncut version shown past midnight as part of Toonami's "Midnight Run." Examples of the edits included the removal of blood, profanity, atheism, and the word "kill" being replaced with the word "destroy" (this was extended to Duo's nickname, "The God of Death," changed to "The Great Destroyer," forcing the alteration of two episode titles), though the word "death" was mostly left intact. All Gundam Wing episodes have been released to VHS and DVD in the U.S. Differences between the two video systems is that the VHS episodes contain the edited version while the DVD episodes contain the uncut version.

Due to the closure of Bandai Entertainment, the series was out-of-print for some time. On October 11, 2014, at their 2014 New York Comic Con panel, Sunrise announced they will be releasing all of the Gundam franchise, including Gundam Wing in North America though distribution from Right Stuf Inc., beginning in Spring 2015. Right Stuf released the series on Blu-ray and DVD in two sets in November 2017. In addition, a collector's edition set containing the complete series, Endless Waltz, Operation Meteor and the Frozen Teardrop picture drama was released in December 2017.

Gundam Wing was also the first Gundam series to air on Philippine television and dubbed in Filipino on GMA Network in 1999.

=== OVAs ===
After the series ended, four original video animation (OVA) episodes, compiling various scenes from the series along with a few minutes of new footage, were released in 1996 as Gundam Wing: Operation Meteor I and II.

A three-part OVA titled Gundam Wing: Endless Waltz was produced in 1997 as a sequel to the TV series; plot-wise, it brought the "After Colony" timeline to a close. The OVA was also notable for its massive redesigns of all the Gundams by Hajime Katoki, such as the Wing Gundam Zero's new "angel-winged" appearance. A compilation film version of Endless Waltz (featuring additional footage, alterations of the music score and a different ending theme) was later released in Japan on August 1, 1998. Endless Waltz premiered on Cartoon Network in the U.S. on November 10, 2000. Both the OVA and film versions of Endless Waltz were later released together on DVD. Right Stuf released both OVAs on Blu-ray and DVD in December 2017 (though Operation Meteor remains un-dubbed).

=== Manga ===
In addition to manga adaptations of the series and Endless Waltz, several manga sidestories have also been produced. Episode Zero is a prequel, detailing the events leading up to series; the stories have been collected in a volume that also contains one brief open-ended interlude, Preventer 5, that details an operation that occurs after Endless Waltz. A coincident storyline to the series is presented in Last Outpost (G-Unit). Several sequel manga, occurring between Gundam Wing and Endless Waltz, have also been written: Blind Target, Ground Zero and Battlefield of Pacifists.

The Gundam Wing, Battlefield of Pacifists and Endless Waltz manga series were published in English by Tokyopop, while Blind Target, Ground Zero and Episode Zero were published by Viz Communications. Another sequel manga detailing the future of the colonies entitled Tiel's Impulse was printed in 1998 and has not been published in the United States.

In September 2010, Gundam Ace magazine began serializing a manga titled New Mobile Report Gundam Wing Endless Waltz: The Glory of Losers that retells the events of the anime while incorporating facts from Episode Zero and the novel Frozen Teardrop. The manga ended in November 2017 and was compiled into fourteen volumes. The manga also uses Hajime Katoki's Gundam redesigns from Endless Waltz and other subsequent media, instead of the original Kunio Okawara designs featured in the anime. Vertical published English editions of the manga volumes under the title Mobile Suit Gundam Wing Endless Waltz: Glory of the Losers from July 2017 to November 2019.

In August 2025, Gundam Ace magazine began serializing Mobile Suit Gundam Wing 0.5 Point Half Preventer-7, a manga written by returning series writer Katsuyuki Sumizawa and illustrated by Sakura Asagi. The story bridges the gap between Mobile Suit Gundam Wing: Endless Waltz and the Gundam Wing: Frozen Teardrop sequel novels.

Writer Kōjirō Taniguchi and artist Tomofumi Ogasawara launched a crossover manga with Code Geass, titled Mobile Suit Gundam Wing × Code Geass: Lelouch of the Rebellion – Minuet Zero (新機動戦記ガンダムW × コードギアス 反逆のルルーシュ メヌエット・ゼロ), on Kadokawa's KadoComi digital platform on July 10, 2026.

=== Novel sequel ===
In early 2010, Gundam Ace magazine announced they would serialize a "New Gundam Wing Project". The project was eventually revealed to be a novel, titled New Mobile Report Gundam Wing: Frozen Teardrop. Written by Katsuyuki Sumizawa, the novel begins a new timeline, following the "Mars Century" calendar ("MC") which was the successor of the previous "After Colony" calendar. According to an interview with the author, the novel spans backwards into the AC century and the Gundam pilots, Relena, and their children make appearances.

=== Other media ===
A fighting video game titled Shin Kidō Senki Gundam Wing: Endless Duel was developed by Natsume Co., Ltd. and released for the Super Famicom in Japan on March 29, 1996. A second fighting game titled Shin Kidō Senki Gundam Wing: The Battle was developed by Natsume Co., Ltd. and released for the PlayStation in Japan on October 11, 2002, as the 13th volume of the Simple Characters 2000 series. Gundam Wing characters and mecha have also appeared in several other video game series including Super Robot Wars, Gundam Battle Assault, Another Century's Episode, Mobile Suit Gundam: Extreme Vs. and Dynasty Warriors: Gundam.

Upon the series' debut in North America, Gundam Wing received a large roster of licensees for merchandise including wallscrolls, apparel, school supplies, skateboards, trading cards, model kits and action figures.

In April 2025, Overwatch collaborated with Gundam Wing to "help celebrate the 30th anniversary". The collaboration featured skins inspired by both the original series as well as Endless Waltz.

== Soundtracks ==
Openings

- "Just Communication" by Two-Mix (ep. 1–40) (YTV Broadcast: 1–49)
- "Rhythm Emotion" by Two-Mix (ep. 41–49)

Ending

- "It's Just Love!" by Rumi Ohishi (ep. 1–49)
- "Just Communication" (Instrumental Version) by Kow Otani (Toonami Broadcast, ep. 1–49; the credits aired over a shortened version of the show's first opening animation)

Insert songs

- "Just Communication" by Two-Mix (eps. 3 & 49)
- "Rhythm Emotion" by Two-Mix (eps. 36, 38, 39, and 41)

== Reception and international broadcasters ==
Gundam Wing was a success in Japan during its initial run; it, along with G Gundam, was the only Gundam series of the 1990s that managed an average television rating over four percent. It was ranked number two in Animage magazine's Anime Grand Prix in 1996 and was also ranked number 76 in the publication's list of the 100 most important anime of all time. The series is infamous within dōjinshi where authors tend to depict romantic relationships between several of the protagonists.

Gundam Wing was a greater success in North America and is credited by John Oppliger on Animation Anime News Blog with single-handedly popularizing the Gundam franchise among American audiences. Just over a week after its premiere on Cartoon Network on March 6, 2000, the series was the top rated program in all age groups. During the summer of 2000, it remained as the first or second top-rated show among kids and teens during its twelve airings per week on the Toonami block. Gundam Wing was ranked the 73rd best animated series by IGN, calling the series "so good that even those opposed to anime have to give the show its due credit".

Mobile Suit Gundam Wing was also the first-ever Gundam-franchise to broadcast internationally in Indonesia by then-Salim Group-owned television station Indosiar from mid-2001 until mid-2002.

== Footnotes ==
Preceded by Mobile Fighter G Gundam	Gundam metaseries (production order); 1995–1996	Succeeded by Mobile Suit Gundam: The 08th MS Team
Preceded by none	Gundam After Colony timeline AC 195	Succeeded by Gundam Wing: Endless Waltz
