= Two-Mix discography =

- Studio albums: 7
- EPs: 1
- Compilation albums: 6
- Singles: 21
- Video albums: 4 (Note: This includes the music video compilation albums and concert DVDs.)
- Box sets: 1
- Self-cover albums: 2
- Remix albums: 3
- Tribute albums: 1

The discography of the J-pop duo Two-Mix consists of seven studio albums, eight compilation albums, and 21 singles released since 1995. In addition, the duo released two studio albums and two singles as II MIX⊿DELTA.

== Albums ==
=== Studio albums ===
Year	Information	Oricon weekly peak position	Sales	RIAJ certification
1995	BPM 132: Released: August 23, 1995; Label: King Records; Formats: CD	16		
1996	BPM 143: Released: January 24, 1996; Label: King Records; Formats: CD	5		Gold
1996	BPM 150 Max: Released: November 21, 1996; Label: King Records; Formats: CD	2		Gold
1997	Fantastix: Released: December 22, 1997; Label: King Records; Formats: CD	11		Gold
1998	Dream Tactix: Released: September 23, 1998; Label: King Records; Formats: CD	6		
1999	Rhythm Formula: Released: November 25, 1999; Label: WEA Japan; Formats: 2CD	18		
2001	0G: Released: October 11, 2001; Label: WEA Japan; Formats: CD	24		

=== Extended plays ===
Year	Information	Oricon weekly peak position	Sales	RIAJ certification
1998	Fantastix II Next: Released: March 4, 1998; Label: King Records; Formats: CD	10		

=== Self-cover albums ===
Year	Information	Oricon weekly peak position	Sales	RIAJ certification
1998	Baroque Best: Released: November 26, 1998; Label: WEA Japan; Formats: CD	19		
2000	BPM Cube: Released: August 9, 2000; Label: Warner Music Japan; Formats: 2CD	16		

=== Compilations ===
Year	Information	Peak positions		Sales	RIAJ certification
Year	Information	Oricon	Billboard Japan	Sales	RIAJ certification
1997	BPM "Best Files": Released: March 13, 1997; Label: King Records; Formats: CD + CD-ROM	6	—		Gold
1998	Super Best Files 1995–1998: Released: December 21, 1998; Label: King Records; Formats: CD	14	—		Gold
2001	20010101: Released: January 1, 2001; Label: King Records; Formats: 4CD	84	—		
2002	7th Anniversary Best: Released: April 24, 2002; Label: WEA Japan; Formats: CD	58	—		
2011	Two-Mix Perfect Best: Released: July 8, 2011; Label: King Records; Formats: CD, digital	103	—		
2021	Two-Mix 25th Anniversary All Time Best: Released: February 10, 2021; Label: King Records; Formats: 2CD, 3CD + Blu-ray, digital	6	7		

=== Box sets ===
Year	Information	Oricon weekly peak position	Sales	RIAJ certification
2002	Two-Mix Collection Box: Categorhythm: Released: November 20, 2002; Label: Warner Music Japan; Formats: CD	163		

=== Remix albums ===
Year	Information	Oricon weekly peak position	Sales	RIAJ certification
1996	Two-(Re)Mix: Released: March 23, 1996; Label: King Records; Formats: CD	15		
1997	BPM "Dance Unlimited": Released: March 26, 1997; Label: King Records; Formats: CD, LP	11		
2001	BPM "Dance Unlimited" II: Released: November 21, 2001; Label: WEA Japan; Formats: CD + CD-ROM	85		

=== Tribute albums ===
Year	Information	Peak positions		Sales	RIAJ certification
Year	Information	Oricon	Billboard Japan	Sales	RIAJ certification
2022	Two-Mix Tribute Album "Crysta-Rhythm": Released: July 27, 2022; Label: King Records; Formats: CD, digital	43	29		

== Singles ==
=== Two-Mix singles ===
List of singles, with selected chart positions
Title	Date	Peak chart positions	Sales (JPN)	RIAJ certification	Album
Title	Date	Oricon Singles Charts	Sales (JPN)	RIAJ certification	Album
"Just Communication"	April 29, 1995	23	264,000	Gold	BPM 132
"Rhythm Emotion"	November 22, 1995	8	353,000	Gold	BPM 143
"Try (Return to Yourself)"	March 23, 1996	17	113,000		BPM 143
"Love Revolution"	July 24, 1996	9	126,000		BPM 150 Max
"Rhythm Generation"	October 2, 1996	9	98,000		BPM 150 Max
"White Reflection"	January 15, 1997	6	156,000	Gold	BPM Best Files
"True Navigation"	June 4, 1997	7	142,000	Gold	Fantastix
"Summer Planet No. 1"	September 3, 1997	8	89,000		Fantastix
"Living Daylights"	November 21, 1997	16	70,000		Fantastix
"Time Distortion"	January 21, 1998	14	50,000		Fantastix II Next
"Beat of Destiny"	May 8, 1998	17	45,000		Dream Tactix
"Last Impression"	July 23, 1998	8	107,000		Dream Tactix
"Truth (A Great Detective of Love)"	November 26, 1998	3	228,710	Gold	Rhythm Formula
"Body Makes Stream"	May 12, 1999	17	45,000		Rhythm Formula
"Maximum Wave"	August 25, 1999	20	36,000		Rhythm Formula
"Side Formula"	October 27, 1999	14	35,000		Non-album single
"Naked Dance"	March 8, 2000	28	16,000		BPM Cube
"Gravity Zero"	August 29, 2001	37			0G
"Before the Ignition"	May 3, 2003	—			Non-album single
"Lightning Evolution"	July 28, 2009	—			Non-album single
"T.R.Y. II (Next)"	January 25, 2013	—			Non-album single
"—" denotes releases that did not chart.

== Videography ==
=== Music video albums ===
List of media, with selected chart positions
Title	Album details	Peak positions		Sales (Oricon)
Title	Album details	JPN DVD	JPN Blu-ray	Sales (Oricon)
Vision Formula	Released: September 22, 1999; Label: WEA Japan; Formats: VHS + CD	—	—	N/A
Naked Dance	Released: March 23, 2000; Label: WEA Japan; Formats: VHS	—	—	N/A
Vision Formula 2000 DVD	Released: March 23, 2000; Label: WEA Japan; Formats: DVD	—	—	N/A
White Reflection: The Movie	Released: August 8, 2001; Label: King Records; Formats: DVD	—	—	N/A

== II MIX⊿DELTA ==
=== Albums ===
Year	Information	Oricon weekly peak position	Sales	RIAJ certification
2005	Delta One: Released: July 27, 2005; Label: Geneon Entertainment; Formats: CD	185		
2006	Delta Two: Universe: Released: June 21, 2006; Label: Geneon Entertainment; Formats: CD	197		
2007	Engage Planet Kiss Dum: Original Soundtrack: Released: July 25, 2007; Label: Geneon Entertainment; Formats: CD	—		

=== Singles ===
List of singles, with selected chart positions
Title	Date	Peak chart positions	Sales (JPN)	RIAJ certification	Album
Title	Date	Oricon Singles Charts	Sales (JPN)	RIAJ certification	Album
"Toki wo Koete"	July 4, 2007	39			Engage Planet Kissdum: Original Soundtrack
"A Runner at Daybreak"	September 14, 2007	133			Delta One
"—" denotes releases that did not chart.
