= Two-Mix 25th Anniversary All Time Best =

Compilation album by Two-Mix
- Released: February 10, 2021
- Recorded: 1995–2013
- Genre: J-pop; electropop; anison
- Language: Japanese
- Label: King Records
- Producer: Two-Mix

Two-Mix chronology
Two-Mix Perfect Best (2011)	Two-Mix 25th Anniversary All Time Best (2021)

Limited Edition cover

Two-Mix 25th Anniversary All Time Best is the sixth compilation album by J-pop duo Two-Mix, released by King Records on February 10, 2021.

The album is offered in two editions: 2 CD standard edition and 3 CD + Blu-ray limited edition. The limited edition release features a Mobile Suit Gundam Wing-themed cover illustrated by Tomofumi Ogasawara, who did the artwork for the 2011 manga adaptation New Mobile Report Gundam Wing Endless Waltz: The Glory of Losers. In addition, it includes a Blu-ray disc that contains the "White Reflection" anime music video remastered in high definition.

== Background ==
On April 29, 2020, at the same time as the start of the Two-Mix's 25th anniversary project, the decision to release a new compilation album was announced. On the same day, the project's official Twitter account went online saying: "This is not a plan to revive Two-Mix or resume activities." (TWO-MIX復活、活動再開の企画ではございません, Tū Mikkusu fukkatsu, katsudō saikai no kikakude wagozaimasen). On October 23, the decision to release this album was announced and the website for the project was opened. Upon its opening, the website held the "Two-Mix Song General Election", where fans voted for up to five songs to be included in the new album. The winning votes were announced on November 12.

== Chart performance ==
The album peaked at No. 6 on Oricon's weekly albums chart and No. 7 on Billboard Japan's Hot Albums chart, becoming the duo's first top-10 album since Dream Tactix in 1998.

== Track listing ==
All lyrics are written by Shiina Nagano; all music is composed by Minami Takayama, except where indicated; all music is arranged by Two-Mix, except where indicated.

Disc 1
No.	Title	Music	Arrangement	Length
1.	"Just Communication"	Kōji Makaino		4:19
2.	"Rhythm Emotion"			3:54
3.	"Try (Return to Yourself)"	Makaino		5:21
4.	"Love Revolution"		Michiaki Katō; Two-Mix	4:42
5.	"Rhythm Generation"			4:19
6.	"White Reflection"		Katō; Nagano	4:45
7.	"True Navigation"			4:14
8.	"Summer Planet No. 1"			4:32
9.	"Living Daylights"			5:58
10.	"Time Distortion"			4:25
11.	"Beat of Destiny"			5:51
12.	"Last Impression"			7:34
13.	"Truth (A Great Detective of Love)"			5:36
14.	"Body Makes Stream"	Nagano		5:10
15.	"Maximum Wave"			4:37
16.	"Naked Dance"			3:58
Total length:				79:13

Disc 2
No.	Title	Music	Arrangement	Length
1.	"Love Formula -Freedom-"			7:41
2.	"Gravity Zero"			5:41
3.	"Meeting on the Planet"			4:58
4.	"Believe My Brave Heart"			4:47
5.	"1st Rhythmic Youth"			5:50
6.	"1st Justice"			5:27
7.	"Break"			5:13
8.	"Before the Ignition"		Two-Mix; Ayumi Miyazaki; Masaya Suzuki	4:20
9.	"Do That Dance"		Two-Mix; Miyazaki; Suzuki	4:55
10.	"At the End of Journey"		Two-Mix; Miyazaki; Suzuki	4:56
11.	"Lightning Evolution"	Nagano	Nagano; Suzuki	5:56
12.	"I'm Yours"	Nagano	Nagano; Suzuki	4:35
13.	"Across the End"	Nagano	Nagano; Suzuki	6:46
14.	"Try II (Next)"	Nagano	Nagano; Suzuki	6:35
Total length:				77:40

Limited Edition Disc 3
No.	Title	Arrangement	Length
1.	"Two-Mix 25th Anthem Medley: The Collaboration Between Two-Mix & Gesshokukaigi: Believe My Brave Heart; Just Communication; Rhythm Emotion; White Reflection; Last Impression; Across the End; Graduation; Believe; Winter Love Express; Trust Me; Silent Cruising; Love Revolution; Endless Love; True Navigation; Meeting on the Planet; Can't Stop Love; Thousand Nights; Divin' to Paradise; From Far Distance; Lightning Evolution; I'll Be There; Living Daylights; Break; Truth (A Great Detective in Love); Try (Return to Yourself); Try II (Next)"	Gesshokukaigi; Nagano	42:50
Total length:			42:50

Limited Edition Blu-ray
No.	Title	Length
1.	"White Reflection: The Movie 25th Anniversary Edition" (Music Video)	4:44
2.	"White Reflection: The Movie" (Music Video)	4:44
3.	"Non Stop Mega Mix" (Music Video)	20:17
4.	"Love Revolution" (Short PV)	0:30
5.	"True Navigation" (Short PV)	0:30
6.	"Summer Planet No. 1" (Short PV)	1:30
7.	"Living Daylights" (Short PV)	1:30
8.	"Time Distortion" (Short PV)	0:30
9.	"Just Communication" (TV Commercial)	0:30
10.	"Rhythm Emotion" (TV Commercial)	0:30
Total length:		35:15

== Charts ==
Chart (2021)	Peak position
Oricon Japanese Albums	6
Billboard Japan Hot Albums	7
Billboard Japan Top Albums Sales	6
