= 20010101 =

Compilation album by Two-Mix
- Released: January 1, 2001
- Recorded: 1995–1998
- Genres: J-pop; electropop; anison
- Length: 3:50:45
- Language: Japanese
- Label: King Records
- Producer: Two-Mix

Two-Mix chronology
BPM Cube (2000)	20010101 (2001)	0G (2001)

20010101 is the third compilation album by J-pop duo Two-Mix, released by King Records on January 1, 2001. The four-disc album covers the duo's singles, B-sides, and other tracks from 1995 to 1998. At the time, it was considered to be an unofficial release, as the duo had left King Records in 1998. The album has since been listed as an official compilation following the release of the 2002 box set Two-Mix Collection Box: Categorhythm.

The album peaked at No. 84 on Oricon's weekly albums chart.

== Track listing ==
All lyrics are written by Shiina Nagano; all music is composed by Minami Takayama, except where indicated; all music is arranged by Two-Mix.

Disc 1
No.	Title	Music	Length
1.	"Just Communication"	Kōji Makaino	4:18
2.	"Good Dance!!"		4:20
3.	"Friend"		4:15
4.	"Silent Cruising"		4:34
5.	"Divin' to Paradise"		4:56
6.	"You Can Do It"		4:11
7.	"Rhythm Emotion"		3:38
8.	"Eternal Motion"		4:53
9.	"Innocent Dance"		4:13
10.	"Come On!!"		4:07
11.	"Endless Love"		6:13
12.	"T-R-Y"	Makaino	5:05
Total length:			54:43

Disc 2
No.	Title	Length
1.	"Love Revolution Max"	3:52
2.	"Trust Me"	5:18
3.	"Rhythm Generation"	4:14
4.	"Dance September Love"	4:57
5.	"Meeting on the Planet"	4:14
6.	"From Far Distance"	4:43
7.	"Maximum"	5:24
8.	"Believe in My Heart" (Instrumental)	4:48
9.	"True Navigation"	4:14
10.	"White Reflection"	4:45
11.	"Summer Planet No. 1"	4:33
12.	"Beat 'Break'" (Instrumental)	1:33
13.	"Break"	4:32
14.	"Wake"	5:40
15.	"Living Daylights"	6:00
Total length:		68:47

Disc 3
No.	Title	Music	Length
1.	"Just Communication II"	Makaino	4:37
2.	"Graduation"		4:07
3.	"March"		4:13
4.	"Winter Love Express"		6:45
5.	"Beat of Destiny"		6:13
6.	"Last Impression"		7:36
7.	"Time Distortion DX"		4:32
8.	"Thousand Nights '98 Selection"		5:12
9.	"Milky Road"		5:12
10.	"I Love You '98 Selection"		5:26
11.	"Truth (A Great Detective of Love)"		5:36
Total length:			59:29

Disc 4: Another One
No.	Title	Music	Remixer	Length
1.	"Rhythm Emotion" (Second Variation '96)		Two-Mix	7:44
2.	"Just Communication" (Second Variation '96)	Makaino	Two-Mix	9:23
3.	"White Reflection" (D-Z Jet Stream Attack Mix)		D-Z	5:22
4.	"Rhythm Generation" (Red Monster Mix)		Takahiro Tashiro for MST	5:07
5.	"Rhythm Emotion" (Raveman Back 2 Rave Mix)		T.Kimura	5:07
6.	"Love Revolution" (Hyper Groove on the D.F. Mix)		Randomizer	5:41
7.	"Just Communication" (Groove That Soul Mix)	Makaino	DJ Turbo (GTS)	5:55
8.	"Time Distortion" (Red Monster Mix)		Tashiro	4:40
Total length:				48:59

== Charts ==
Chart (2001)	Peak position
Japanese Albums (Oricon)	84
