= Perfect Best (Two-Mix album) =

Two-Mix Perfect Best

Compilation album by Two-Mix
- Released: June 8, 2011
- Recorded: 1995–1998
- Genre: J-pop; electropop; anison
- Length: 70:12
- Language: Japanese
- Label: King Records
- Producer: Two-Mix

Two-Mix chronology
Two-Mix Collection Box: Categorhythm (2002)	Two-Mix Perfect Best (2011)	Two-Mix 25th Anniversary All Time Best (2021)

Two-Mix Perfect Best (TWO-MIX パーフェクト・ベスト, Tū Mikkusu Pāfekuto Besuto) is the fifth compilation album by J-pop duo Two-Mix, released by King Records on June 8, 2011. The album covers the duo's singles, B-sides, and other tracks from 1995 to 1998. It was the duo's first new release since the 2002 box set Two-Mix Collection Box: Categorhythm.

The album peaked at No. 103 on Oricon's weekly albums chart.

== Track listing ==
All lyrics are written by Shiina Nagano; all music is composed by Minami Takayama, except where indicated; all music is arranged by Two-Mix.

No.	Title	Music	Length
1.	"Just Communication"	Kōji Makaino	4:19
2.	"Rhythm Emotion"		3:55
3.	"Try (Return to Yourself)" (Super Single Edition)	Makaino	5:21
4.	"Love Revolution"		4:42
5.	"Rhythm Generation"		4:19
6.	"Meeting on the Planet"		4:59
7.	"White Reflection"		4:46
8.	"True Navigation"		4:14
9.	"Summer Planet No. 1"		4:33
10.	"Living Daylights"		5:58
11.	"Break"		5:14
12.	"Time Distortion"		4:26
13.	"Beat of Destiny"		5:52
14.	"Last Impression"		7:34
Total length:			70:12

== Charts ==
Chart (2011)	Peak position
Japanese Albums (Oricon)	103
