= Super Best Files 1995–1998 =

Compilation album by Two-Mix
- Released: December 21, 1998
- Recorded: 1995–1998
- Genre: J-pop; electropop; anison
- Length: 73:07
- Language: Japanese
- Label: King Records
- Producer: Two-Mix

Two-Mix chronology
Baroque Best (1998)	Super Best Files 1995–1998 (1998)	Rhythm Formula (1999)

Super Best Files 1995–1998 is the second compilation album by J-pop duo Two-Mix, released by King Records on December 21, 1998. The album covers the duo's singles, B-sides, and other tracks from 1995 to 1998. At the time, it was considered to be an unofficial release, as the duo had left King Records and signed with Warner Music Japan earlier that year. The album has since been listed as an official compilation following the release of the 2002 box set Two-Mix Collection Box: Categorhythm.

The album peaked at No. 14 on Oricon's weekly albums chart. It was also the duo's fifth and final album to be certified Gold by the RIAJ.

== Track listing ==
All lyrics are written by Shiina Nagano; all music is composed by Minami Takayama, except where indicated; all music is arranged by Two-Mix.

No.	Title	Music	Length
1.	"Just Communication"	Kōji Makaino	4:18
2.	"Rhythm Emotion"		3:55
3.	"White Sailing"		4:42
4.	"Try (Return to Yourself)"	Makaino	5:21
5.	"Love Revolution"		4:41
6.	"Rhythm Generation"		3:55
7.	"Maximum"		4:24
8.	"White Reflection"		4:46
9.	"True Navigation"		4:14
10.	"Summer Planet No. 1"		4:32
11.	"Living Daylights"		5:59
12.	"Time Distortion"		4:25
13.	"Graduation"		4:07
14.	"Beat of Destiny"		5:51
15.	"Last Impression"		7:34
Total length:			73:07

== Charts ==
Chart (1998)	Peak position
Japanese Albums (Oricon)	14

== Certification ==
Region	Certification	Certified units/sales
Japan (RIAJ)	Gold	200,000^{^}
^{^} Shipments figures based on certification alone.
