= BPM "Best Files" =

Compilation album by Two-Mix
- Released: March 13, 1997
- Recorded: 1995–1996
- Genres: J-pop; electropop; anison
- Length: 67:47
- Language: Japanese
- Label: King Records
- Producer: Two-Mix

Two-Mix chronology
BPM 150 Max (1996)	BPM "Best Files" (1997)	BPM "Dance Unlimited" (1997)

Singles from BPM "Best Files"
- 1. "White Reflection" Released: January 15, 1997

BPM "Best Files" is the first compilation album by J-pop duo Two-Mix, released by King Records on March 13, 1997. The album covers the duo's singles, B-sides, and other tracks from 1995 to 1996. It also includes a bonus CD-ROM that features the music video for the single "White Reflection".

The album peaked at No. 6 on Oricon's weekly albums chart. It was also certified Gold by the RIAJ.

== Track listing ==
All lyrics are written by Shiina Nagano; all music is composed by Minami Takayama, except where indicated; all music is arranged by Two-Mix.

CD
No.	Title	Music	Length
1.	"White Reflection"		4:46
2.	"Just Communication"	Kōji Makaino	4:20
3.	"Rhythm Emotion"		3:55
4.	"Rhythm Generation"		3:55
5.	"Innocent Dance"		4:17
6.	"Believe"		5:45
7.	"Love Revolution"		4:43
8.	"Silent Cruising"		4:36
9.	"Because I Love You"		4:35
10.	"Divin' to Paradise"		4:56
11.	"Meeting on the Planet"		5:00
12.	"Endless Love"		6:14
13.	"Trust Me"		5:24
14.	"Try (Return to Yourself)"	Makaino	5:21
Total length:			67:47

CD-ROM
No.	Title	Length
1.	"White Reflection" (Promotion Clip)	4:41
2.	"Single TV Spots"
3.	"Discography"

== Charts ==
Chart (1997)	Peak position
Japanese Albums (Oricon)	6

== Certification ==
Region	Certification	Certified units/sales
Japan (RIAJ)	Gold	200,000^{^}
^{^} Shipments figures based on certification alone.
