= Two-(Re)Mix =

Remix album by Two-Mix
- Released: March 23, 1996
- Recorded: 1995
- Genre: J-pop; electropop; anison
- Length: 41:00
- Language: Japanese
- Label: King Records
- Producer: Two-Mix

Two-Mix chronology
BPM 143 (1996)	Two-(Re)Mix (1996)	BPM 150 Max (1996)

Two-(Re)Mix (stylized as TWO→(RE)MIX) is the first remix album by J-pop duo Two-Mix, released by King Records on March 23, 1996. It features remixes of the Mobile Suit Gundam Wing opening themes "Just Communication" and "Rhythm Emotion".

The album peaked at No. 15 on Oricon's weekly albums chart.

== Track listing ==
All lyrics are written by Shiina Nagano; all music is arranged by Two-Mix.

No.	Title	Music	Length
1.	"Rhythm Emotion" (Second Variation '96)	Minami Takayama	7:44
2.	"Rhythm Emotion" (Melody Box Edition)	Takayama	3:05
3.	"Just Communication" (Second Variation '96)	Kōji Makaino	9:23
4.	"Just Communication" (Melody Box Edition)	Makaino	3:41
5.	"Rhythm Emotion" (Instrumental)	Takayama	7:45
6.	"Just Communication" (Instrumental)	Makaino	9:23
Total length:			41:00

== Charts ==
Chart (1996)	Peak position
Japanese Albums (Oricon)	15
