= BPM Cube =

Compilation album by Two-Mix
- Released: August 9, 2000
- Recorded: 2000
- Studio: Warner Music Recording Studio
- Genres: J-pop; electropop; Eurobeat; anison
- Length: 1:55:22
- Languages: English; Japanese
- Label: WEA Japan
- Producer: Two-Mix

Two-Mix chronology
Rhythm Formula (1999)	BPM Cube (2000)	20010101 (2001)

Singles from BPM Cube
- 1. "Naked Dance" Released: March 8, 2000

BPM Cube is the second self-cover album by J-pop duo Two-Mix, released by WEA Japan on August 9, 2000. It includes the single "Naked Dance". Disc 1 consists of English-language versions of the duo's hit songs, while Disc 2 features new remixes of the duo's singles.

The album peaked at No. 16 on Oricon's weekly albums chart.

== Track listing ==
All lyrics are written by Shiina Nagano, except where indicated; all music is composed by Minami Takayama, except where indicated; all music is arranged by Two-Mix.

Disc 1: International
No.	Title	Lyrics	Music	Length
1.	"True Navigation"	Nagano; Yosuke Kakegawa		4:11
2.	"Just Communication"	Nagano; Carol Dawsonan	Kōji Makaino	5:21
3.	"Truth (A Great Detective of Love)"	Nagano; Kakegawa		5:46
4.	"Naked Dance"	Nagano; Kakegawa		3:59
5.	"Can't Stop Love ♥♥"	Nagano; Kakegawa		6:02
6.	"Dance September Love"	Nagano; Kakegawa		5:45
7.	"Innocent Dance"	Nagano; Kakegawa		5:06
8.	"Rhythm Emotion"	Nagano; Kakegawa		3:36
9.	"Stayin' Alive"	Nagano; Kakegawa		5:28
10.	"Meeting on the Planet"	Nagano; Kakegawa		5:49
Total length:				51:03

Disc 2: Domestic
No.	Title	Music	Length
1.	"BPM"		4:27
2.	"Truth (A Great Detective of Love)"		5:45
3.	"Just Communication"	Makaino	5:22
4.	"True Navigation"		4:11
5.	"De.Show!!"		4:11
6.	"Naked Dance"		3:58
7.	"Can't Stop Love ♥♥"		6:02
8.	"Dance September Love"		5:51
9.	"Rhythm Emotion"		3:36
10.	"Innocent Dance"		5:06
11.	"Stayin' Alive"		5:28
12.	"Meeting on the Planet"		5:50
13.	"Stance of Resistance"		4:34
Total length:			64:21

== Charts ==
Chart (2000)	Peak position
Japanese Albums (Oricon)	16
