= Fantastix II Next =

EP by Two-Mix
- Released: March 4, 1998
- Recorded: 1997
- Genre: J-pop; electropop; anison
- Length: 28:54
- Language: Japanese
- Label: King Records
- Producer: Two-Mix

Two-Mix chronology
Fantastix (1997)	Fantastix II Next (1998)	Dream Tactix (1998)

Singles from Fantastix II Next
- 1. "Time Distortion" Released: January 21, 1998

Fantastix II Next is an EP by J-pop duo Two-Mix, released by King Records on March 4, 1998. It includes the single "Time Distortion", which was used as the ending theme of the TBS variety show King's Brunch. As the direct follow-up to the duo's fourth album Fantastix, the EP's track listing starts at number 14.

The album peaked at No. 10 on Oricon's weekly albums chart.

== Track listing ==
All lyrics are written by Shiina Nagano; all music is composed by Minami Takayama, except where indicated; all music is arranged by Two-Mix, except where indicated.

No.	Title	Music	Arrangement	Length
14.	"Just Communication II"	Kōji Makaino		4:37
15.	"Graduation"			4:07
16.	"Far from Distance (Silk Road)"			5:12
17.	"March"			4:13
18.	"Living Daylights Pure"			6:05
19.	"Time Distortion" (Red Monster Mix)		Two-Mix; Takahiro Tashiro	4:40
Total length:				28:54

== Charts ==
Chart (1998)	Peak position
Japanese Albums (Oricon)	10
