= 7th Anniversary Best =

Compilation album by Two-Mix
- Released: April 24, 2002
- Recorded: 1998–2001
- Genres: J-pop; electropop; anison
- Length: 77:15
- Language: Japanese
- Label: WEA Japan
- Producer: Two-Mix

Two-Mix chronology
BPM "Dance Unlimited" II (2002)	7th Anniversary Best (2002)	Two Mix Collection Box: Categorhythm (2002)

7th Anniversary Best is the fourth compilation album by J-pop duo Two-Mix, released by WEA Japan on April 24, 2002. The album covers the duo's singles, B-sides, and other tracks from 1998 to 2001.

The album peaked at No. 58 on Oricon's weekly albums chart.

== Track listing ==
All lyrics are written by Shiina Nagano; all music is composed by Minami Takayama, except where indicated; all music is arranged by Two-Mix, except where indicated.

No.	Title	Music	Arrangement	Length
1.	"La Vie en Rose"			5:07
2.	"Body Makes Stream"	Nagano		5:08
3.	"Maximum Wave"			4:36
4.	"Naked Dance"			4:00
5.	"Love Formula (Freedom)"			7:42
6.	"Gravity Zero"			6:09
7.	"Last Tears: I Don't Cry Anymore, After You Left Me..."			4:25
8.	"Holy Night Destiny (Boy Meets Girl)"			5:15
9.	"In Your Eyes"			5:22
10.	"Justice"			5:26
11.	"Truth (A Great Detective of Love)"			7:27
12.	"Airmail from the Moon"			6:05
13.	"Discharge"			5:59
14.	"Stance of Resistance"		Nagano	4:34
Total length:				77:15

== Charts ==
Chart (2002)	Peak position
Japanese Albums (Oricon)	58
