= Music of Mobile Suit Gundam Wing =

This article lists the albums attributed to the series Mobile Suit Gundam Wing and Gundam Wing: Endless Waltz.

== Soundtracks ==
=== Shin Kidousenki Gundam Wing: Operation 1 ===
Shin Kidousenki Gundam Wing: Operation 1

Soundtrack album by Kow Otani, Two-Mix, Rumi Ooishi
- Released: July 7, 1995
- Genre: Anime soundtrack
- Label: Starchild
- Producer: Kow Otani

Catalog Number

KICA-251

All music is composed by Kow Otani except where noted. All music performed by the King Philharmonic Orchestra (conducted by Hiroshi Kumagai) except where noted.

No.	Title	Lyrics	Music	Artist	Length
1.	"The Wings of a Boy that Killed Adolescence"				1:54
2.	"A Black Wind Invites You to Death"				1:48
3.	"Back in the Smell of Blood and Gunpowder"				1:44
4.	"Searching for Peace Buried Amid the Corpses"				1:36
5.	"When the Dragon Swims, Everything Ends"				1:38
6.	"Just Communication"	Shiina Nagano	Minami Takayama	Two-Mix	4:20
7.	"The Curtain of the Next Act Now Rises"				1:25
8.	"Eternity and Infinity Are In These Hands"				2:19
9.	"Treize Khushrenada - The Person Who Makes History"				2:05
10.	"Use the Cloak of Darkness"				2:14
11.	"You Can Hear a Voice Calling the Soul"				1:53
12.	"GW Bridge Collection I"				1:08
13.	"Soft Hair, See-Through Eyes"				2:08
14.	"Inside the Girl's Heart..."				1:29
15.	"The Night the Moon Smiled, I Heard The Whispers of the Stars"				1:35
16.	"To Sweetness, To Elegance, and To Noble-Mindedness"				3:36
17.	"I Feel Like I Can Cross Even That Rainbow Bridge"				1:31
18.	"Crushed Peace, Time to Get Moving"				2:12
19.	"The Strings and Marionette of a Conspiracy"				2:13
20.	"Coolheaded Bloodthirstiness"				3:33
21.	"As Relena Peacecraft"				1:34
22.	"From Anxiety to Impatience"				1:07
23.	"Heero's Time of Decision"				1:22
24.	"Gundam Wing Bridge Collection II"				0:40
25.	"Pain That Should Have Been Abandoned Long Ago"				2:06
26.	"That Clown Doesn't Need Make Up for Tears"				1:42
27.	"Hourglass of a Sad Color"				1:36
28.	"Heart-Pounding Harmony"				1:06
29.	"Peaceful Moment With You"				2:12
30.	"Mission Accomplished"				1:41
31.	"Gundam Raid"				2:08
32.	"Tactical Battlefield"				2:13
33.	"OZ Mobile Suits Draw Near"				2:12
34.	"Force Your Way Through"				2:12
35.	"Fluctuating Target"				1:20
36.	"Unknown Pressure"				1:11
37.	"Zechs Comes"				1:56
38.	"Just Communication" (Instrumental Version)		Two-Mix		1:03
39.	"Code Name is Heero Yuy"				1:12
40.	"It's Just Love"	Kana Matsumoto	Seiji Koizumi	Rumi Ooishi	3:56

=== Shin Kidousenki Gundam Wing: Operation 2 ===
Shin Kidousenki Gundam Wing: Operation 2

Soundtrack album by Kow Otani, Hikaru Midorikawa, Toshihiko Seki, Shigeru Nakahara, Ai Orikasa, Ryuzou Ishino, Rumi Ooishi
- Released: October 5, 1995
- Genre: Anime soundtrack
- Label: Starchild

Catalog Number

KICA-263

All music is composed by Kow Otani except where noted. All music performed by the King Philharmonic Orchestra (conducted by Hiroshi Kumagai) except where noted.

No.	Title	Lyrics	Music	Artist	Length
1.	"Cry for the Dream"	Yoshihiko Ando	Yoshifumi Ushima	Heero Yuy (Hikaru Midorikawa)	4:01
2.	"Good Luck and Good-Bye"	Ando	Masaya Ozeki	Duo Maxwell (Toshihiko Seki)	3:52
3.	"The Clown"	Keiko Kimoto	Ushima	Trowa Barton (Shigeru Nakahara)	5:34
4.	"I'm Your Friend"	Kimoto	Motoyoshi Iwasaki	Quatre Raberba Winner (Ai Orikasa)	3:53
5.	"Knock at Tomorrow's Door"	Ando	Shikyo Iwasaka	Chang Wufei (Ryuzou Ishino)	3:51
6.	"It's Just Love!" (TV size)	Matsumoto	Koizumi	Rumi Ooishi	1:13
7.	"New Hope"				1:29
8.	"True Figure of Truth"				3:01
9.	"Mission"				1:19
10.	"Soldiers Who Don't Have Grave-Post"				1:07
11.	"Touched Heartstrings"				1:14
12.	"Everyone's Thought"				2:24
13.	"Invitation from Hell"				2:13
14.	"Smoke & Bullet Rain"				2:54
15.	"That Day Was The Last Day I Saw Your Smile"				1:30
16.	"With Only That, I'm Happy"				1:18
17.	"Left Smell of Summer"				2:30
18.	"Like Venus Melting In The Morning"				2:38
19.	"Break Out"				1:13
20.	"Sympathy"				2:35
21.	"Scattering Left Light"				1:06
22.	"Signs of Consciousness"				2:38
23.	"Just Communication" (TV size)	Nagano	Takayama	Two-Mix	1:22

=== Shin Kidousenki Gundam Wing: Operation 3 ===
Shin Kidousenki Gundam Wing: Operation 3

Soundtrack album by Kow Otani, Akiko Yajima, Hikaru Midorikawa, Sayuri Yamauchi, Toshihiko Seki, Naoko Matsui, Two-Mix
- Released: December 21, 1995
- Genre: Anime soundtrack
- Label: Starchild

Catalog Number

KICA-277

All music is composed by Kow Otani except where noted. All music performed by the King Philharmonic Orchestra (conducted by Hiroshi Kumagai) except where noted.

No.	Title	Lyrics	Music	Artist	Length
1.	"Always a Secret"			Relena Peacecraft (Akiko Yajima)	4:41
2.	"Only if You Smile"			Heero Yuy (Hikaru Midorikawa)	4:47
3.	"Brightness & Darkness"			Lady Une (Sayuri Yamauchi)	5:03
4.	"It'll Be OK!"			Duo Maxwell (Toshihiko Seki)	4:23
5.	"Joy to My Life"			Dorothy Catalonia (Naoko Matsui)	4:06
6.	"Behind The Scenes of The Blackout"				1:42
7.	"Legend of Zero - XXXG-00W0"				1:37
8.	"Hellraiser Returns"				1:33
9.	"The Labyrinth Called Yourself"				1:47
10.	"Requiem, Softly"				1:41
11.	"The Soldier Milliardo"				1:46
12.	"Interlude-The Final Chapter"				2:01
13.	"The Eye of a Mobile Doll"				3:25
14.	"Secret Ambitions"				1:45
15.	"The Abandoned Horse of The Age"				1:54
16.	"Well-Planned Strategy/Tactics"				3:08
17.	"Accelerated Beat"				1:29
18.	"Dangerous Shining Because For The Purity"				1:39
19.	"I Don't Like Fairy Tale"				1:29
20.	"I Believed We'd Meet"				1:55
21.	"Ties-From The Cockpit of A (An Expected/Resigned) Suicide Mission"				1:37
22.	"Proof of Existence"				1:39
23.	"Reversal of A Memory"				1:37
24.	"What Are You Looking For On The Other Side of Victory?"				1:29
25.	"The Flight Towards The Future"				1:40
26.	"Who Will Give Their Life? (Burn)"				1:36
27.	"Rhythm Emotion" (TV size)	Nagano	Takayama	Two-Mix	1:25

=== Shin Kidousenki Gundam Wing: Operation 4 ===
Shin Kidousenki Gundam Wing: Operation 4

Soundtrack album by Hikaru Midorikawa, Akiko Yajima, Toshihiko Seki, Takehito Koyasu, Ai Orikasa, Shigeru Nakahara, Ryoutarou Okiayu, Ryoutarou Okiayu, Two-Mix
- Released: March 23, 1996
- Genre: Anime soundtrack
- Label: Starchild

Catalog Number

KICA-295

No.	Title	Lyrics	Music	Artist	Length
1.	"With Only My Words"			Heero Yuy (Hikaru Midorikawa)	4:37
2.	"Love is Not Crying Yet"			Relena Peacecraft (Akiko Yajima)	4:27
3.	"Wild Wing"			Duo Maxwell (Toshihiko Seki)	4:19
4.	"Far Off Dawn"			Zechs Merquise (Takehito Koyasu)	5:08
5.	"Star's Gaze"			Quatre Raberba Winner (Ai Orikasa)	5:20
6.	"Love is A Shooting Star"			Trowa Barton (Shigeru Nakahara)	4:26
7.	"Stardust Soldiers"			Treize Khushrenada (Ryoutarou Okiayu)	6:03
8.	"Grasp the Truth"			Chang Wufei (Ryuzou Ishino)	3:59
9.	"Rhythm Emotion"	Nagano	Takayama	Two-Mix	3:56
10.	"Flying Away"			Heero Yuy (Hikaru Midorikawa)	4:34

=== Shin Kidousenki Gundam Wing: Operation S - Endless Waltz - Original Sound Track ===
Shin Kidousenki Gundam Wing: Operation S - Endless Waltz - Original Sound Track

Soundtrack album by Kow Otani, Two-Mix
- Released: 1997
- Genre: Anime soundtrack
- Label: Starchild

Catalog Number

KICA-2063

All music is composed by Kow Otani except where noted. All music performed by the King Philharmonic Orchestra (conducted by Hiroshi Kumagai) except "White Reflection" by Two-Mix.

No.	Title	Lyrics	Music	Length
1.	"Prologue: AC195 Xmas Eve"			4:57
2.	"White Reflection" (Short Version)	Nagano	Takayama	1:46
3.	"Journey to the Sun"			2:36
4.	"Main Title - Sub Title"			0:24
5.	"AC196 Xmas Eve"			4:15
6.	"At Circus Tent"			1:36
7.	"The Powergame"			2:51
8.	"Heero's Dream"			3:50
9.	"Appearance of Mariemaia"			2:11
10.	"Enforcement Rush"			3:47
11.	"Duel!"			3:09
12.	"The Dangerous Game"			3:13
13.	"Codename: WIND"			3:15
14.	"Battlefield"			4:52
15.	"Perplexity"			4:10
16.	"Holy Night"			1:32
17.	"Wufei's Irritation"			3:52
18.	"Clash at the Stratosphere"			4:22
19.	"Sorrowful Memory"			3:30
20.	"Final Attack"			4:03
21.	"Riot of Citizens"			2:14
22.	""ENDLESS WALTZ""			2:45
23.	"White Reflection" (Reprise, Full Size Version)	Nagano	Takayama	4:45

== Singles ==
=== Just Communication ===
"Just Communication"

Single by Two-Mix
- Released: April 29, 1995
- Genre: Anime soundtrack
- Label: Starchild
- Songwriter(s): Minami Takayama, Shiina Nagano

Catalog Number

KIDA-99

All lyrics are written by Shiina Nagano except tracks 3-4; all music is composed by Minami Takayama.

No.	Title	Length
1.	"Just Communication"
2.	"Second Impression"
3.	"Just Communication" (original karaoke)
4.	"Second Impression" (original karaoke)

=== It's Just Love! ===
"It's Just Love!"

Single by Lumi Ohishi
- Released: May 21, 1995
- Genre: Anime soundtrack
- Label: Apollon Records
- Songwriter(s): Kana Matsumoto, Seiji Koizumi

Catalog Number

APDM-5023

No.	Title	Lyrics	Music	Length
1.	"It's Just Love!"	Matsumoto	Koizumi
2.	"迷路の地図"
3.	"It's Just Love!" (karaoke)		Koizumi
4.	"迷路の地図" (karaoke)

=== Rhythm Emotion ===
"Rhythm Emotion"

Single by Two-Mix
- Released: November 22, 1995
- Genre: Anime soundtrack
- Label: Starchild
- Songwriter(s): Takayama, Nagano

Catalog Number

KIDA-121

All lyrics are written by Shiina Nagano except tracks 3-4; all music is composed by Minami Takayama.

No.	Title	Length
1.	"Rhythm Emotion"
2.	"Endless Love"
3.	"Rhythm Emotion" (original karaoke)
4.	"Endless Love" (original karaoke)

=== Mind Education ===
"Mind Education"

Single by Misty Eyes
- Released: November 21, 1996
- Genre: Anime soundtrack
- Label: Starchild

Catalog Number

KIDA-139

No.	Title	Length
1.	"Mind Education"
2.	"Snow Planet"
3.	"Mind Education" (karaoke)
4.	"Snow Planet" (karaoke)

=== White Reflection ===
"White Reflection"

Single by Two-Mix
- Released: January 15, 1997
- Genre: Anime soundtrack
- Label: Starchild
- Songwriter(s): Takayama, Nagano

Catalog Number

KIDS-320

All lyrics are written by Shiina Nagano except tracks 3-4; all music is composed by Minami Takayama.

No.	Title	Length
1.	"White Reflection"
2.	"Burning"
3.	"White Reflection" (original karaoke)
4.	"Burning" (original karaoke)

=== Last Impression ===
"Last Impression"

Single by Two-Mix
- Released: July 23, 1998
- Genre: Anime soundtrack
- Label: Starchild
- Songwriter(s): Takayama, Nagano

Catalog Number

KIDS-391

All lyrics are written by Shiina Nagano except track 4; all music is composed by Minami Takayama.

No.	Title	Length
1.	"Last Impression"
2.	"Last Impression" (Radio edit)
3.	"Just Communication II Type II"
4.	"Last Impression" (Radio edit, instrumental)

== Radio Drama CDs ==
=== Shin Kidousenki Gundam Wing: Blind Target-1 ===
Shin Kidousenki Gundam Wing: Blind Target-1

Studio album
- Released: January 15, 1997
- Genre: Radio drama
- Label: Starchild

Catalog Number

KICA-329

No.	Title	Artist	Length
1.	"プロローグ"
2.	"Mind Reaction" (Short version)	Misty Eyes
3.	"第1話「閉じられない終幕」"
4.	"make my way"	Shigeru Nakahara
5.	"第2話「蠢く野望」"
6.	"It's so all right!"	Toshihiko Seki
7.	"第3話「裏切りと再会」"
8.	"第4話「忘れられた悲劇」"
9.	"BRAVE EYES"	Ai Orikasa

=== Shin Kidousenki Gundam Wing: Blind Target-2 ===
Shin Kidousenki Gundam Wing: Blind Target-2

Studio album
- Released: February 21, 1997
- Genre: Radio drama
- Label: Starchild

Catalog Number

KICA-338

No.	Title	Artist	Length
1.	"Mind Education"	Misty Eyes
2.	"第5話「隠された扉」"
3.	"第6話「復讐と祈り」"
4.	"Let into Top"	Ryuzou Ishino
5.	"第7話「偽りの未来」"
6.	"第8話「閃光の彼方」"
7.	"TAKE OFF TO THE SKY"	Hikaru Midorikawa
8.	"エピローグ"
