= BPM "Dance Unlimited" =

Remix album by Two-Mix
- Released: March 26, 1997
- Recorded: 1996
- Genres: J-pop; electropop; anison
- Length: 36:12
- Language: Japanese
- Label: King Records
- Producer: Two-Mix

Two-Mix chronology
BPM "Best Files" (1997)	BPM "Dance Unlimited" (1997)	Fantastix (1997)

BPM "Dance Unlimited" (stylized as BPM "DANCE∞") is the second remix album by J-pop duo Two-Mix, released by King Records on March 26, 1997. It features remixes of six of the duo's hit singles. The album is the duo's only release offered in 12" LP format.

The album peaked at No. 11 on Oricon's weekly albums chart.

== Track listing ==
All lyrics are written by Shiina Nagano.

Side A
No.	Title	Music	Remixer	Length
1.	"White Reflection" (D-Z Jet Stream Attack Mix)	Minami Takayama	D-Z	5:22
2.	"Rhythm Generation" (Red Monster Mix)	Takayama	Takahiro Tashiro for MST	5:07
3.	"Rhythm Emotion" (Raveman Back to Rave Mix)	Takayama	T.Kimura (Raveman)	5:07
Total length:				15:36

Side B
No.	Title	Music	Remixer	Length
4.	"Love Revolution" (Hyper Groove on the D.F. Mix)	Takayama	Randomizer	5:41
5.	"Just Communication" (Groove That Soul Mix)	Kōji Makaino	DJ Turbo (GTS)	5:55
6.	"Try (Return to Yourself)" (High Fly Vocal Mix)	Makaino	Jet Rag	9:00
Total length:				20:36

== Charts ==
Chart (1997)	Peak position
Japanese Albums (Oricon)	11
