= Baroque Best =

Compilation album by Two-Mix
- Released: November 26, 1998
- Recorded: 1998
- Studio: Warner Music Recording Studio
- Genres: J-pop; electropop; anison
- Length: 60:45
- Language: Japanese
- Label: WEA Japan
- Producer: Two-Mix

Two-Mix chronology
Dream Tactix (1998)	Baroque Best (1998)	Super Best Files 1995–1998 (1998)

Baroque Best is the first self-cover album by J-pop duo Two-Mix, released as the duo's first album under WEA Japan on November 26, 1998. It features the duo's hit songs remixed with orchestral backgrounds by Les Solistes de Versailles, the Warsaw National Philharmonic Orchestra, and Orchestre Chimérique.

The album peaked at No. 19 on Oricon's weekly albums chart.

== Track listing ==
All lyrics are written by Shiina Nagano; all music is composed by Minami Takayama; all music is arranged by Two-Mix.

No.	Title	Orchestra	Length
1.	"Living Daylights"	Les Solistes de Versailles	5:51
2.	"Rhythm Generation"	Les Solistes de Versailles	4:54
3.	"Summer Planet No. 1"	Les Solistes de Versailles	5:24
4.	"Rhythm Emotion"	Les Solistes de Versailles	3:55
5.	"Last Impression"	Warsaw National Philharmonic Orchestra	8:52
6.	"Beat of Destiny"	Warsaw National Philharmonic Orchestra	6:11
7.	"Believe My Brave Heart"	Warsaw National Philharmonic Orchestra	5:10
8.	"Symphonic Suite 'Two-Mix' Singles 1995–1998" (交響組曲「TWO-MIX」 SINGLES 1995〜1998: "Rhythm Generation"; "Summer Planet No. 1"; "Living Daylights"; "Last Impression"; "Rhythm Emotion"; "Believe My Brave Heart")	Warsaw National Philharmonic Orchestra	13:51
9.	"Truth (Ballad Style) - A Great Detective of Love" (Bonus Track)	Orchestre Chimérique	6:37
Total length:			60:45

== Charts ==
Chart (1998)	Peak position
Japanese Albums (Oricon)	19
