= Two-Mix Tribute Album "Crysta-Rhythm" =

Compilation album by Various artists
- Released: July 27, 2022
- Recorded: 2022
- Genre: J-pop; pop rock; dance-pop; anison
- Language: Japanese
- Label: King Records

Music video
- Two-Mix Tribute Album "Crysta-Rhythm trailer 1 on YouTube

Two-Mix Tribute Album "Crysta-Rhythm" is a various artists album paying tribute to J-pop duo Two-Mix, released by King Records on July 27, 2022. It features artists such as Angela, Nagi Yanagi, Hikaru Midorikawa, Chihiro Yonekura, and others.

The album peaked at No. 43 on Oricon's weekly albums chart and No. 29 on Billboard Japan's Hot Albums chart.

== Track listing ==
All lyrics are written by Shiina Nagano; all music is composed by Minami Takayama, except where indicated.

No.	Title	Music	Artist	Length
1.	"Just Communication"	Kōji Makaino	Angela	4:09
2.	"Rhythm Emotion"		Nagi Yanagi	3:58
3.	"White Reflection"		Hikaru Midorikawa	5:03
4.	"Last Impression"		Chihiro Yonekura	7:32
5.	"Try (Return to Yourself)"	Makaino	Megumi Nakajima	5:45
6.	"Living Daylights"		Machico	5:17
7.	"Truth (A Great Detective of Love)"		Nano	5:35
8.	"Thousand Nights"		Aki Okui	4:11
9.	"Trust Me"		Hironobu Kageyama	5:32
10.	"Winter Love Express"		Yūka Nanri with Tsukemen	6:11

== Charts ==
Chart (2022)	Peak position
Japanese Albums (Oricon)	43
Japanese Hot Albums (Billboard Japan)	29
