= BPM 143 =

Studio album by Two-Mix
- Released: January 24, 1996
- Recorded: 1995
- Genres: J-pop; electropop; anison
- Length: 46:33
- Language: Japanese
- Label: King Records
- Producer: Two-Mix

Two-Mix chronology
BPM 132 (1995)	BPM 143 (1996)	Two-(Re)Mix (1996)

Singles from BPM 143
- 1. "Rhythm Emotion" Released: November 22, 1995; 2. "Try (Return to Yourself)" Released: March 23, 1996

BPM 143 is the second studio album by J-pop duo Two-Mix, released by King Records on January 24, 1996. It includes the singles "Rhythm Emotion" (the second opening theme of the anime series Mobile Suit Gundam Wing) and "T-R-Y" (ending theme of the TBS sports program Super Soccer).

The album peaked at No. 5 on Oricon's weekly albums chart. It was also the duo's first album to receive Gold certification by the RIAJ.

== Track listing ==
All lyrics are written by Shiina Nagano; all music is composed by Minami Takayama, except where indicated; all music is arranged by Two-Mix.

No.	Title	Music	Length
1.	"Rhythm Emotion"		3:54
2.	"Eternal Motion"		4:52
3.	"I'll Be There"	Kōji Makaino	4:23
4.	"Innocent Dance"		4:13
5.	"Come On!!"		4:07
6.	"Endless Love"		6:13
7.	"Because I Love You"		4:35
8.	"Dear My Regret"		4:27
9.	"T-R-Y"	Makaino	5:04
10.	"White Sailing"		4:41
Total length:			46:33

== Charts ==
Chart (1996)	Peak position
Japanese Albums (Oricon)	5

== Certification ==
Region	Certification	Certified units/sales
Japan (RIAJ)	Gold	200,000^{^}
^{^} Shipments figures based on certification alone.
