= BPM 132 =

Studio album by Two-Mix
- Released: August 23, 1995
- Recorded: 1995
- Genres: J-pop; electropop; anison
- Length: 44:56
- Language: Japanese
- Label: King Records
- Producer: Two-Mix

Two-Mix chronology
BPM 132 (1995)	BPM 143 (1996)

Singles from BPM 132
- 1. "Just Communication" Released: April 29, 1995

BPM 132 is the debut studio album by J-pop duo Two-Mix, released by King Records on August 23, 1995. It includes the debut single "Just Communication", which was used as the first opening theme of the anime series Mobile Suit Gundam Wing. At the time of the album's release, members Shiina Nagano and Minami Takayama and composer Kōji Makaino were not credited, as the duo's management ISM Artist (株式会社イズム・アーティスト, Kabushiki-gaisha Izumu Ātisuto) marketed Two-Mix as a "Virtual Artist" (ヴァーチャルアーティスト, Vācharu Ātisuto).

The album peaked at No. 16 on Oricon's weekly albums chart.

== Track listing ==
All lyrics are written by Shiina Nagano; all music is composed by Minami Takayama, except where indicated; all music is arranged by Two-Mix.

No.	Title	Music	Length
1.	"Just Communication"	Kōji Makaino	4:17
2.	"Good Dance!!"		4:20
3.	"Thousand Nights"		4:29
4.	"Friend"		4:15
5.	"Silent Cruising"		4:34
6.	"Callin' You"		4:15
7.	"Divin' to Paradise"		4:56
8.	"I Love You"		4:47
9.	"Second Impression"		4:51
10.	"You Can Do It"		4:11
Total length:			44:56

== Charts ==
Chart (1995)	Peak position
Japanese Albums (Oricon)	16
