= BPM "Dance Unlimited" II =

Remix album by Two-Mix
- Released: November 21, 2001
- Recorded: 2001
- Genres: J-pop; electropop; anison
- Length: 62:36
- Language: Japanese
- Label: WEA Japan
- Producer: Two-Mix

Two-Mix chronology
0G (2001)	BPM "Dance Unlimited" II (2001)	7th Anniversary Best (2002)

BPM "Dance Unlimited" II (stylized as BPM "DANCE∞" II) is the third remix album by J-pop duo Two-Mix, released by WEA Japan on November 21, 2001. It features remixes of eight of the duo's hit singles. The album includes a bonus CD-ROM containing three music videos.

The album peaked at No. 85 on Oricon's weekly albums chart.

== Track listing ==
All lyrics are written by Shiina Nagano; all music is composed by Minami Takayama, except where indicated.

CD
No.	Title	Music	Remixer	Length
1.	"Truth (A Great Detective of Love)" (Kenny's Sublimity Mix)		Kenny (Orienta-Rhythm)	7:52
2.	"Body Makes Stream" (Red Monster Trance Mix)	Nagano	Takahiro Tashiro and Kotaro Chuganji (MST)	8:20
3.	"Maximum Wave" (Hole in My Shoe Mix)		Tomofumi "Chibun" Suzuki	7:02
4.	"In Your Eyes" (Family Basic Mix)		Johnny Deeperrrrr2001	8:26
5.	"Love Formula -Freedom-" (Sphere Trance Mix)		Bevel	7:22
6.	"Naked Dance" (Batter 9 Mix)		Batter 9	7:47
7.	"Gravity Zero" (Beat Sonic Mix)		DJ Nabe	8:18
8.	"La Vie en Rose" (R-Control Mix)		Tetsuya "Remo-Con" Tamura (Y & Co.)	7:29
Total length:				62:36

CD-ROM
No.	Title	Length
4.	"Body Makes Stream" (Promotional Video Clip)
5.	"Maximum Wave" (Promotional Video Clip)
6.	"Gravity Zero" (Promotional Video Clip)

== Charts ==
Chart (2001)	Peak position
Japanese Albums (Oricon)	85
