= Rhythm Formula =

Studio album by Two-Mix
- Released: November 25, 1999
- Recorded: 1998–1999
- Studio: Warner Music Recording Studio
- Genre: J-pop; electropop; anison
- Length: 1:58:35
- Language: Japanese
- Label: WEA Japan
- Producer: Two-Mix

Two-Mix chronology
Super Best Files 1995–1998 (1998)	Rhythm Formula (1999)	BPM Cube (2000)

Singles from Rhythm Formula
- 1. "Truth (A Great Detective of Love)" Released: November 26, 1998; 2. "Body Makes Stream" Released: May 12, 1999; 3. "Maximum Wave" Released: August 28, 1999

Rhythm Formula is the sixth studio album by J-pop duo Two-Mix, released by WEA Japan on November 25, 1999. It includes the singles "Truth (A Great Detective of Love)" (episode 124–142 opening theme of the anime TV series Case Closed), "Body Makes Stream" (theme song of the TBS sports program Super Soccer), and "Maximum Wave" (commercial theme for SSAWS), as well as the song "Last Tears (I Don't Cry Anymore, After You Left Me...)" (the first ending theme of the anime TV series Jibaku-kun). Rhythm Formula is the duo's first double album, with the second disc featuring variations of the duo's side projects and covers of Yellow Magic Orchestra's "Technopolis", Mariko Nagai's "Keep on 'Keeping On'", and Yuji Ohno's "Theme from Lupin the Third". "Truth (Duet with Conan)" is a hidden track on disc 2, with vocalist Minami Takayama singing as Conan Edogawa.

The album peaked at No. 18 on Oricon's weekly albums chart.

== Track listing ==
All lyrics are written by Shiina Nagano; all music is composed by Minami Takayama, except where indicated; all music is arranged by Two-Mix.

Disc 1: Rhythm Formula I
No.	Title	Music	Length
1.	"Rhythm Force" (Instrumental)		3:21
2.	"Love Formula =Freedom= Custom"		6:36
3.	"Ready, Go!!"		5:09
4.	"Body Makes Stream 2002"	Nagano	5:09
5.	"Beat Maximum" (Instrumental)		1:02
6.	"Maximum Wave Maximum"		4:56
7.	"Last Tears (I Don't Cry Anymore, After You Left Me...)"		4:27
8.	"Truth Custom (A Great Detective of Love)"		7:30
9.	"Mission Cinderella"		4:17
10.	"In Your Eyes III"		5:48
11.	"Key of Love II"		5:19
12.	"In Your Eyes II"		5:24
13.	"Airmail from the Moon"		6:05
14.	"Love Formula Pure"		5:31
Total length:			70:34

Disc 2: Rhythm Formula II
No.	Title	Music	Length
1.	"Technopolis New Genesis" (Instrumental)	Ryuichi Sakamoto	6:48
2.	"Endless Communication Custom"		5:41
3.	"1st Rhythmic Youth"		5:52
4.	"1st Justice"		5:28
5.	"1st Kiss"		5:41
6.	"Keep on 'Keeping On' Custom"	Midori Karashima	4:51
7.	"Two-Mix Meets Lupin III Next Generation"	Yuji Ohno	6:27
8.	"Truth (Duet with Conan)" (Secret Track)		7:10
Total length:			47:58

== Charts ==
Chart (1999)	Peak position
Japanese Albums (Oricon)	18
