= Joe Rinoie =

Japanese musician

- Born: December 13, 1960 (age 65); Kanagawa, Japan
- Genres: Pop, rock
- Occupations: Producer, singer, composer
- Years active: 1980s-present
- Formerly of: Romantic Mode

Joe Rinoie (ジョー・リノイエ; born December 13, 1960 in Kanagawa, Japan) is a Japanese record producer, singer and composer.

== Biography ==
=== Early life ===
Rinoie was born in Kanagawa, Japan. His mother is a Han Chinese in Japan, while his father is Japanese, thus he is mixed half Chinese, half Japanese.

=== Music career ===
Rinoie began his music career in the late 1980s, as a member of the Japanese pop/rock band D-Project, which also included members Masaki Suzukawa and Tatsuya Honda. In 1988, the group released their debut album Prototype, under the Fitzbeat label; the album featured songs such as "Sayonara, So Long", and "Sexy Girl". The group released their second album Tempest (1990), then released their third and final album Pages (1993), under the Sony label before disbanding.

Rinoie is also a former member of Romantic Mode. After spending many years as a studio musician, he became a producer under the MUV Rinoie Ltd. label.

His song "Synchronized Love" appears in several installments of the Dance Dance Revolution game series and in Commercials promoting Takefuji Corp with dancers.

He was most recently in the J-pop group, II Mix⊿Delta, a new formation of Two-Mix, singing alongside Minami Takayama.
