= Romantic Mode =

Japanese pop group

- Also known as: ROmantic Mode, RO-M
- Origin: Japan
- Genres: Pop, dance, electronic, anime
- Years active: 1995 – 1999
- Labels: King Records (1996 – 1998); Toshiba EMI (1999)
- Members: Akira Asakura; Joe Rinoie; Masaki Suzukawa

Romantic Mode (stylized as ROMANTIC MODE) was a Japanese pop group that debuted in 1996 with their first single, "Dreams." The members are Akira Asakura (vocals), Masaki Suzukawa (guitars/keyboards), and Joe Rinoie (keyboards/backup vocals).

Their style is electronic pop.

Two of their songs, "DREAMS" and "Resolution," were used in the anime After War Gundam X as the first and second opening songs, respectively.

The group broke up soon after their last album was released in 1999. However, Akira Asakura continued as a solo artist initially under her birthname, Saori Saito, but reverted to her stagename in 2005.

== Discography ==
=== Singles ===
- 22 May 1996: "DREAMS"
- 23 October 1996: "Resolution"
- 21 February 1997: "LIBERTY"
- 21 May 1997: "Love Is The Destiny"
- 21 August 1997: "Eien ga Owaru made Atsui KISS wo Shiyō" (永遠が終わるまで熱いKISSをしよう)
- 21 February 1998: "Runner"

=== Albums ===
- 21 August 1996: ROmantic Mode [sic]
- 21 December 1996: Vision of Love
- 22 October 1997: Dimensions
- 25 March 1999: romantic pleasures

== Personnel ==
- Akira Asakura – vocals
- Joe Rinoie – keyboards, backing vocals
- Masaki Suzukawa – guitar, keyboards
