= Angela (band) =

Japanese pop band

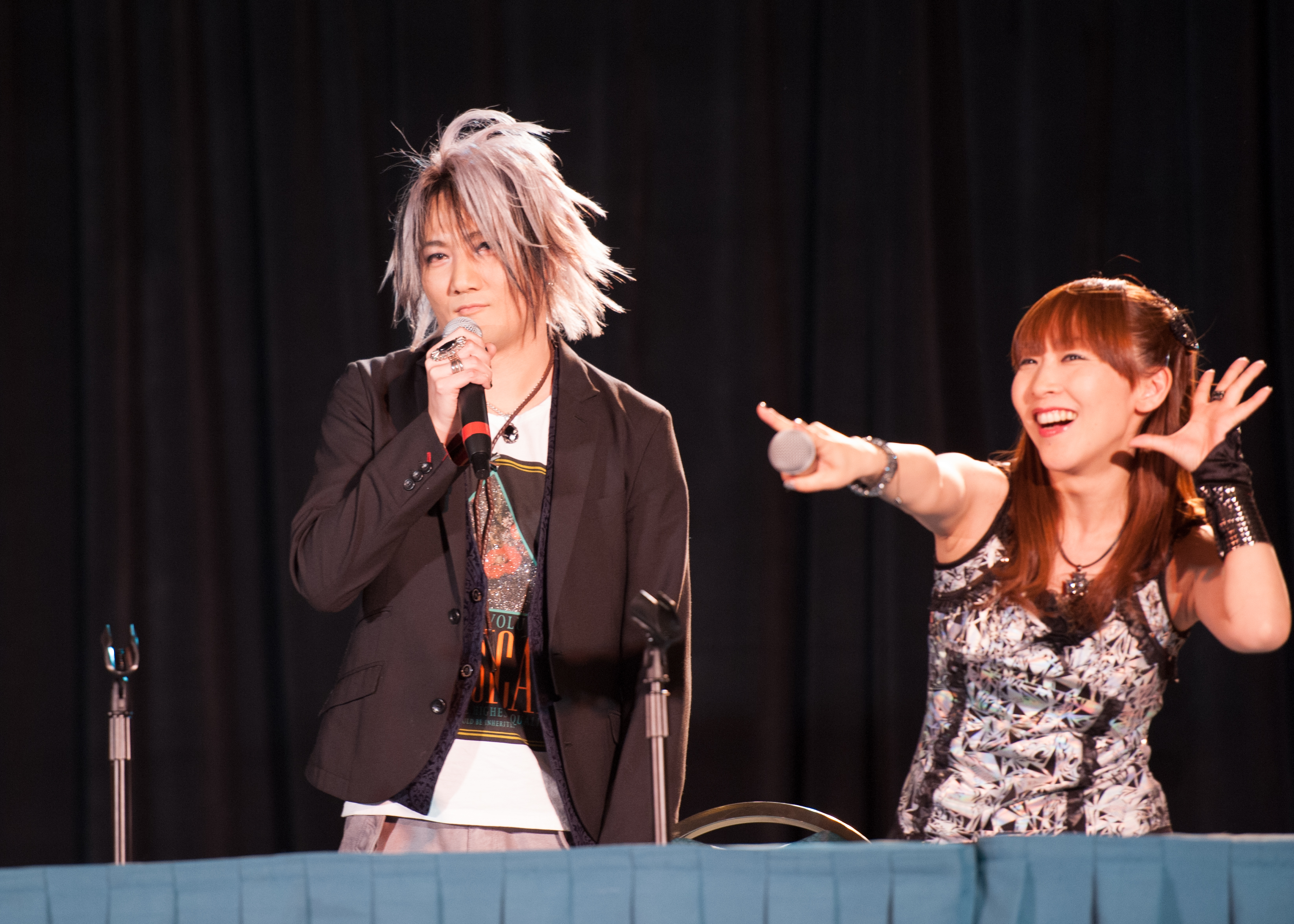
- Angela at Anime Central 2014

Background information
- Origin: Japan
- Genres: J-pop; Anison
- Years active: 1993–present
- Label: Starchild
- Members: Atsuko; Katsu
- Website: angela-official.com

Angela (stylized in lowercase) is a Japanese band, notable for having their music portrayed as theme songs for several anime television shows. The main members are Atsuko and Katsu. Their signature upbeat tunes and rich arrangements combine elements of rock, electronica, jazz and ska. In 2008, they started an alter ego band called Domestic Love Band (ドメスティック・ラヴバンド). They are most well known for providing all opening and ending themes to the Fafner in the Azure anime series.

== History ==
Although both Atsuko and Katsu were born in Okayama Prefecture, they met for the first time in Tokyo at a music school. In 1993 angela was formed and they began as street performers. In 1999 they made their debut with the single memories, however this release went largely unnoticed. However, in 2002 angela signed on with Starchild. Their breakthrough came when they wrote the opening song, "Asu e no brilliant road" (明日へのbrilliant road), along with three different ending themes for the anime Stellvia of the Universe. Their first album, Sora no Koe (ソラノコエ) was released by Starchild in 2003. Since then they have provided songs for the show Fafner in the Azure and have released eight more studio albums: I/O in 2004, PRHYTHM in 2006, Land Ho! in 2009, mirror☆ge in 2011, ZERO in 2013, ONE WAY in 2015, LOVE & CARNIVAL in 2016, and Beyond in 2017; as well as two best-of compilations: Takarabako -Treasure Box- (宝箱 - Treasure Box) in 2007, and Takarabako 2 -Treasure Box II- (宝箱2 -Treasure Box II-) in 2014.

In 2004, angela played at the Otakon Convention in Baltimore, Maryland. The following year, 2005, saw live performances at Sakura-Con in Seattle, Washington, and also at Fan Expo Canada (known at the time as CN Anime) in Toronto, Ontario, Canada.

Sora no Koe was released in the United States by the Geneon label as Voice of the Sky in January 2005. Their second album I/O was released under the Geneon label in the U.S. in August 2005. Their next album, PRHYTHM, was released by Geneon in the U.S. in November 2006.

In 2010, for the first time, Angela performed at Southeast Asia's largest anime convention, Anime Festival Asia (AFA), held annually in Singapore. It is also their first time performing in the country. In 2011, they followed up with another performance organised by jplex in Singapore at Republic Polytechnic. In the same year, they appeared in Singapore again at Anime Festival Asia 2011. In 2012, they were invited for the third time to perform at Anime Festival Asia 2012 in Indonesia. The following year in 2013, they would return to perform in Singapore at the Anime Festival Asia 2013. In 2018, they were invited for the fifth time to perform in Singapore at the Anime Festival Asia 2018.

In July 2013, Angela performed for the first time in Paris, France at the Japanese culture convention, Japan Expo. On 31 October 2013, Angela launched their official YouTube channel. They would make an appearance, at the Anime Expo anime convention in Los Angeles in July 2014. 19th September 2015, Angela performed their first concert in Germany at the anime convention Connichi in Kassel. In 2017, their song "Zenryoku☆Summer!" (全力☆Summer!, "Full Power☆Summer!") was used as the opening theme to the anime series Aho-Girl.

On June 4, 2023, Angela was officially certified by the Guinness World Records for "Most songs sung by the same artist for an animation franchise" in the Fafner in the Azure series. The award was presented at the Fafner in the Azure BEHIND THE LINE special screening event on the same day. It was also announced that a complete album containing all songs from the Fafner in the Azure series is in production.

== Members ==
Current members

- Atsuko Yamashita (山下 敦子; born January 23, 1975) – vocals, lyrics, songwriting
- Katsunori "Katsu" Hirasato (平里 勝敬; born June 12, 1974) – songwriting, arrangements, keyboards, guitar

Support band members

- Yasuhiro "Jimbo-chan" Kojima (小島 億洋) – drums
- Yūki Somekawa (染川 裕紀) – bass
- Buono – bass
- Kanako Yamaguchi (山口 佳名子) – violin
- Hazuki (葉月) – trombone
- Manami (愛美) – trumpet
- Nao (ナオ) – saxophone

== Discography ==
=== Albums ===
==== Studio albums ====
Title	Album details	Peak chart positions	Sales
Title	Album details	JPN	Sales
Sora no Koe	Released: December 3, 2003; Label: Starchild; Formats: CD, digital download, streaming	36	JPN: 16,000
I/O	Released: November 7, 2004; Label: Starchild; Formats: CD, digital download, streaming	16	JPN: 33,000
Prhythm	Released: March 15, 2006; Label: Starchild; Formats: CD, digital download, streaming	10	JPN: 30,000
Land Ho!	Released: September 9, 2009; Label: Starchild; Formats: CD+DVD, CD, digital download, streaming	24	JPN: 12,000
Mirror*ge	Released: June 22, 2011; Label: Starchild; Formats: CD+DVD, CD, digital download, streaming	23	JPN: 7,000
Zero	Released: April 24, 2013; Label: Starchild; Formats: CD, digital download, streaming	10	JPN: 13,000
One Way	Released: May 20, 2015; Label: Starchild; Formats: CD, digital download, streaming	10	JPN: 10,000
Love & Carnival	Released: August 31, 2016; Label: Starchild; Formats: CD+Blu-ray disc, CD, digital download, streaming	4	JPN: 9,000
Beyond	Released: December 20, 2017; Label: Starchild; Formats: CD+Blu-ray disc, CD, digital download, streaming	31	JPN: 5,000
Battle & Message	Released: May 19, 2021; Label: Starchild; Formats: CD+Blu-ray disc, CD, digital download, streaming	13	JPN: 3,000
Welcome!	Released: October 25, 2023; Label: Starchild; Formats: CD+Blu-ray disc, CD, digital download, streaming	36	JPN: 2,000
Answer	Released: October 8, 2025; Label: Starchild; Formats: CD+M-card, CD, digital download, streaming	24	JPN: 1,900

==== Extended plays ====
Title	Album details	Peak chart positions	Sales
Title	Album details	JPN	Sales
Love Love Sweetie (Note: Self-release sold primarily at live venues.)	Independent release; Released: May 2000; Formats: CD	—	
Angela no Natsu	Independent release; Released: August 2000; Formats: CD	—	
Tears On My Pillow	Independent release; Released: November 2000; Formats: CD	—	
Viva: Angela 1,2,3	Independent release; Released: 2001; Formats: CD; Set of four EPs released between January and June 2001.	—	
Viva: Mix	Independent release; Released: June 2001; Formats: CD	—	
Angela no Natsu 2001	Independent release; Released: August 2001; Formats: CD	—	
Angela no Natsu 2002	Independent release; Released: June 2002; Formats: CD	—	
Shinjuku Rhapsody	Lion-Maru G tribute album; Released: December 6, 2006; Label: Starchild; Formats: CD, digital download, streaming	57	JPN: 5,000
Fafner in the Azure Heaven and Earth Image Mini Album	Fafner in the Azure image album; Released: August 5, 2010; Label: Starchild; Formats: CD, digital download, streaming	30	JPN: 6,500
Yoru ga Hakobarete Kuru Made ni	Concept mini-album inspired by a short story collection of the same name by author Keiichi Sigsawa.; Released: January 19, 2011; Label: Starchild; Formats: CD, digital download, streaming	52	JPN: 3,500
K Seven Songs	K (TV series) theme song collection; Released: November 28, 2018; Label: Starchild; Formats: CD+Blu-ray disc, digital download, streaming	28	JPN: 3,800

==== Compilation albums ====
Title	Album details	Peak chart positions	Sales
Title	Album details	JPN	Sales
Takarabako: Treasure Box	Greatest hits album; Released: December 12, 2007; Label: Starchild; Formats: CD, digital download, streaming	19	JPN: 28,500
Takarabako 2: Treasure Box II	Greatest hits album; Released: May 21, 2014; Label: Starchild; Formats: CD, digital download, streaming	20	JPN: 5,500
Fafner in the Azure Complete Best Album	Fafner in the Azure theme song collection; Released: February 11, 2015; Label: Starchild; Formats: CD, digital download, streaming	17	JPN: 7,800
Angela All Time Best 2003–2009	Singles collection; Released: October 24, 2018; Label: Starchild; Formats: CD, digital download, streaming	20	JPN: 4,100
Angela All Time Best 2010–2017	Singles collection; Released: October 24, 2018; Label: Starchild; Formats: CD, digital download, streaming	18	JPN: 4,300
Fafner in the Azure All Songs	Fafner in the Azure theme song collection; Released: November 27, 2024; Label: Starchild; Formats: CD, digital download, streaming	23	JPN: 3,800

=== Singles ===
==== 1990s - 2000s ====
List of singles as lead artist
Title	Year	Peak chart positions		Sales	Certifications	Album
Title	Year	JPN	JPN Hot 100 (Note: The Billboard Japan Hot 100 chart was established in 2008.)	Sales	Certifications	Album
"Memories"	1999	—				Angela All Time Best 2003–2009
"Colors"	2002	—				Non-album single
"Asu e no Brilliant Road"	2003	15		JPN: 57,000		Sora no Koe
"The End of the World"	2003	21		JPN: 24,000		Sora no Koe
"Merry-Go-Round"	2003	72		JPN: 3,000		I/O
"Fly Me to the Sky"	2004	35		JPN: 20,000		Prhythm
"In Your Arms"	2004	48		JPN: 5,000		Treasure Box
"Shangri-La"	2004	12		JPN: 60,000	RIAJ (dig.): Platinum	I/O
"Mirai to Iu Na no Kotae"	2005	24		JPN: 14,000		Prhythm
"Dead Set"	2005	19		JPN: 15,000		Prhythm
"You Get to Burning"	2005	18		JPN: 15,000		Non-album single
"Peace of Mind"	2005	16		JPN: 18,500		Prhythm
"Gravitation"	2007	19		JPN: 14,500		Treasure Box
"Beautiful Fighter"	2008	19	97	JPN: 17,000		Land Ho!
"Yakusoku"	2008	42	—	JPN: 7,500		Treasure Box 2
"Spiral"	2009	14	—	JPN: 14,500		Land Ho!
"Alternative"	2009	16	—	JPN: 13,000		Mirror*ge
"—" denotes a recording that did not chart or was not released in that territory.

==== 2010s ====
List of singles as lead artist (continued)
Title	Year	Peak chart positions		Sales	Album
Title	Year	JPN	JPN Hot 100	Sales	Album
"Aoi Haru"	2010	27	— (Note: "Aoi Haru" did not enter the Billboard Japan Hot 100, but peaked at number 27 on the Top Singles Sales chart.)	JPN: 9,000	Mirror*ge
"Sōkyū"	2010	17	65	JPN: 10,500	Mirror*ge
"The Lights of Heroes"	2012	40	58	JPN: 2,500	Zero
"Kings"	2012	21	23	JPN: 14,000	Zero
"Angel"	2013	34	— (Note: "Angel" and "Tōku Made" did not enter the Billboard Japan Hot 100, but their double A-side single peaked at number 34 on the Top Singles Sales chart.)	JPN: 4,000	One Way
"Tōku Made"	2013	34	—	JPN: 4,000	Non-album single
"Bye Bye All Right"	2013	—	—		One Way
"Sidonia"	2014	19	31	JPN: 11,000	One Way
"Different Colors"	2014	22	— (Note: "Different Colors" did not enter the Billboard Japan Hot 100, but peaked at number 20 on the Top Singles Sales chart.)	JPN: 5,000	One Way
"Kirakira-go-round" (with Shoko Nakagawa)	2014	46	— (Note: "Kirakira-go-round" did not enter the Billboard Japan Hot 100, but peaked at number 45 on the Top Singles Sales chart.)	JPN: 2,000	Angela All Time Best 2010–2017
"Exist"	2015	7	8	JPN: 16,500	One Way
"Kishi Kōshinkyoku"	2015	43	31	JPN: 6,000	Love & Carnival
"Dead or Alive"	2015	11	14	JPN: 16,500	Love & Carnival
"Boku wa Boku de Atte" (with FripSide)	2016	46	50	JPN: 11,500	Beyond
"The End of Escape" (with FripSide)	2016	19	44		Non-album single
"Calling You"	2017	—	—		Beyond
"Zenryoku Summer!"	2017	29	80	JPN: 5,000	Beyond
"Survive!"	2018	21	— (Note: "Survive!" did not enter the Billboard Japan Hot 100, but peaked at number 22 on the Top Singles Sales chart.)	JPN: 4,000	Battle & Message
"The Beyond"	2019	20	92	JPN: 6,000	Battle & Message
"—" denotes a recording that did not chart or was not released in that territory.

==== 2020s ====
List of singles as lead artist
Title	Year	Peak chart positions		Sales	Album
Title	Year	JPN	JPN Hot 100	Sales	Album
"Otome no Route wa Hitotsu ja nai!"	2020	19	— (Note: "Otome no Route wa Hitotsu ja nai!" did not enter the Billboard Japan Hot 100, but peaked at number 19 on the Top Singles Sales chart.)	JPN: 4,000	Battle & Message
"Kimi no Kage, Orange no Sora"	2020	—	—		Battle & Message
"Sakebe"	2020	11	86	JPN: 5,500	Battle & Message
"Naze ni..."	2021	—	—		Fafner in the Azure All Songs
"Kimi o Yurusu Yō ni"	2021	—	—		Fafner in the Azure All Songs
"Andante ni Koi o Shite!"	2021	38	— (Note: "Andante ni Koi o Shite!" did not enter the Billboard Japan Hot 100, but peaked at number 42 on the Top Singles Sales chart.)	JPN: 1,500	Battle & Message
"Anata ga Kureta Hikari"	2021	—	—		Welcome!
"Yoakemachi no Ballade"	2021	—	—		Fafner in the Azure All Songs
"Shangri-La: The Beyond"	2021	—	— (Note: "Shangri-La: The Beyond" did not enter the Billboard Japan Hot 100, but peaked at number 67 on the Download Songs chart.)		Welcome!
"Hitohira no Mirai"	2022	—	—		Welcome!
"Alone"	2022	—	—		Welcome!
"Aloha Travelling"	2022	—	—		Welcome!
"Ima o Ikiru Tame ni"	2022	—	—		Fafner in the Azure All Songs
"Sugisarishi Hi yo"	2022	—	—		Fafner in the Azure All Songs
"Reconnection"	2023	25	— (Note: "Reconnection" did not enter the Billboard Japan Hot 100, but peaked at number 27 on the Top Singles Sales chart.)	JPN: 1,500	Welcome!
"Start Again"	2023	—	—		Welcome!
"Ima Demo"	2023	—	—		Welcome!
"Ayakashi"	2023	47	— (Note: "Ayakashi" did not enter the Billboard Japan Hot 100, but peaked at number 49 on the Top Singles Sales chart.)	JPN: 800	Welcome!
"Harenochi Hallelujah!" (with Shōta Aoi)	2023	39	— (Note: "Harenochi Hallelujah!" did not enter the Billboard Japan Hot 100, but peaked at number 40 on the Top Singles Sales chart.)	JPN: 1,300	Answer
"Fly Alive"	2024	—	—		Answer
"Bokura no Uta"	2024	—	—		Answer
"Saizai Saikōkyū no Osewa Shite"	2026	35	— (Note: "Saizai Saikōkyū no Osewa Shite" did not enter the Billboard Japan Hot 100, but peaked at number 36 on the Top Singles Sales chart.)		TBA
"—" denotes a recording that did not chart or was not released in that territory.

=== Other appearances ===
List of other appearances, showing other performing artists, year released, and album name
Title	Year	Other performer(s)	Album
"Oneness" (2014 ver.)	2014	Eir Aoi, Afilia Saga, Kanako Ito, Wake Up, Girls!, Kensho Ono, Oldcodex, Eri Kitamura, Minami Kuribayashi, Granrodeo, Maon Kurosaki, Zaq, JAM Project, Sweet Arms, Konomi Suzuki, Star Anis, Takayoshi Tanimoto, Yukari Tamura, Minori Chihara, T.M. Revolution, Asami Nakaya, Ryūda Project, Jin Hashimoto, Fhána, Flow, Petit Milady, Yui Horie, Sachika Misawa, Nana Mizuki, Suzuko Mimori, Mamoru Miyano, μ's, May'n, Yui Ogura, Kaori Ishihara, Aoi Yūki, Hitomi Yoshida, Lisa, Hironobu Kageyama	Non-album single
"Just Communication"	2022		Two-Mix Tribute Album "Crysta-Rhythm"
"Oneness" (20th anniversary)	2025	Shōta Aoi, Yoko Ishida, Maaya Uchida, Masayoshi Ōishi, Masami Okui, Granrodeo, Minami Kuribayashi, Kotoko, Zaq, JAM Project, Konomi Suzuki, Minori Chihara, True, Fhána, Flow, Nana Mizuki, May'n, Hiroko Moriguchi, Chihiro Yonekura	Non-album singles
"Butter-Fly" (from The First Take)	2025	Masayoshi Ōishi, Masami Okui, TrySail, Flow	Non-album singles

== Tie-in ==
Song	Tie-in	Year
Memories	Anime television series Shin Hakkenden opening theme	1999
明日へのbrilliant road (Asu e no brilliant road)	Anime television series Stellvia opening theme	2003
綺麗な夜空 (Kirei na Yozora)	Anime television series Stellvia 1st ending theme	2003
The end of the world	Anime television series Stellvia 2nd ending theme	2003
明日へのbrilliant road ～second genesis～ (Asu e no brilliant road ~second genesis~)	Anime television series Stellvia insert song	2003
Dear my friend	Anime television series Stellvia final episode ending theme	2003
merry-go-round	Television Variety Kaiun! Nandemo Kanteidan ending theme	2003
butterfly	Radio program Nagasawa Nao to angela no Ora! Radio! ending song	2003
Stay With Me	Anime television series Saikoro Bot Konbok (a.k.a. Cubix) opening theme	2003
笑顔でバイバイ (Egao de Bye Bye)	Anime television series Saikoro Bot Konbok ending theme	2003
fly me to the sky	Anime television series Soukyuu no Fafner image song	2004
Proof	Anime television series Soukyuu no Fafner 15th episode ending theme	2004
in your arms	Television Drama ヴァンパイアホスト opening theme	2004
solitude	Television Drama Vampire Host ending theme	2004
Shangri-La	Anime television series Soukyuu no Fafner opening theme	2004
Separation	Anime television series Soukyuu no Fafner ending theme	2004
Separation[pf]	Anime television series Soukyuu no Fafner special ending theme	2004
How many?	Radio program angela no sparking!talking!show! opening theme	2004
feel, like a breeze	Radio program angela no sparking!talking!show! ending theme	2004
YOU GET TO BURNING (cover)	Anime television series Martian Successor Nadesico opening theme	2005
Dearest (cover)	Anime film Martian Successor Nadesico: The Motion Picture – Prince of Darkness ending theme	2005
未来とゆう名の答え (Mirai to Yuu Na no Kotae)	Anime television series Jinki: Extend ending theme	2005
DEAD SET	Anime television series Soukyuu no Fafner RIGHT OF LEFT image song	2005
Peace of mind	Anime television series Soukyuu no Fafner RIGHT OF LEFT theme song	2005
果て無きモノローグ (Hatenaki Monologue)	Anime television series Soukyuu no Fafner RIGHT OF LEFT insert song	2005
鳥 (Tori)	Television Drama Lion Maru G 1st ending theme	2006
人生遊戯 (Jinsei Yugi)	Television Drama Lion Maru G 2nd ending theme	2006
gravitation	Anime television series Heroic Age opening theme	2007
君の傍で (Kimi no Soba de)	Radio program angelaのsparking!talking!show! ending song	2007
Theme principal	Anime television series Ryoko's Case File opening theme	2008
Theme principal La chanson d'atsuko	Anime television series Ryoko's Case File ending theme	2008
Beautiful fighter	Anime television series Shikabane Hime opening theme	2008
My story	Anime television series Shikabane Hime ending theme	2008
約束 (Yakusoku)	Anime television series Soukyuu no Fafner 5th Anniversary theme song	2008
Beginning	Anime television series Shikabane Hime: Kuro 1st ending theme	2009
光、探せなくとも (Hikari, Sagase Naku Tomo)	Anime television series Shikabane Hime: Kuro 3rd ending theme	2009
謝罪状況 (Shazai Jokyo)	Anime television series Shikabane Hime: Kuro insert song	2009
Spiral	Anime television series Asura Cryin' opening theme	2009
Link	Anime television series Asura Cryin' ending theme	2009
オルタナティヴ (Alternative)	Anime television series Asura Cryin' 2 opening theme	2009
彼方のdelight (Kanata no delight)	Anime television series Asura Cryin' 2 ending theme	2009
キラフワ (Kirafuwa)	Anime television series Asura Cryin' 2 final episode ending theme	2009
「リアル」は... ("Real" wa...)	Japanese film Shinju Tenshi theme song	2010
ツナガル→ム (Tsunaga Room)	Television broadcast a-GENERATION opening theme	2010
Wonderful World	Japanese film Wonderful World theme song	2010
蒼い春 (Aoi Haru)	Anime television series Seitokai Yakuindomo ending theme	2010
FORTUNES	Anime film Soukyuu no Fafner: HEAVEN AND EARTH image song	2010
理解と破壊へのプレリュード (Rikai to Hakai no Prelude)	Soukyuu no Fafner: HEAVEN AND EARTH image song	2010
蒼穹 (Soukyuu)	Anime film Soukyuu no Fafner: HEAVEN AND EARTH theme song	2010
さよならの時くらい微笑んで (Sayonara no Toki Kurai Hohoen de)	Anime film Soukyuu no Fafner: HEAVEN AND EARTH insert song	2010
Shangri-La[mf]	Stage play Soukyuu no Fafner ~FACT AND RECOLLECTION~ theme song	2010
THE LIGHTS OF HEROES	PlayStation Portable RPG Heroes Phantasia theme song	2012
Cry out	Anime television series Kokoro Connect 2nd ending theme	2012
いつかのゼロから (Itsuka no Zero Kara)	Anime television series K image and insert song	2012
境界線Set me free (Kyoukaisen Set me free)	Anime television series K insert song	2012
KINGS	Anime television series K opening theme	2012
-Requiem of Red-	Anime television series K insert song	2012
To be with U!	Anime television series K final episode ending theme	2012
Remember me	Musical theater Soukyuu no Fafner theme song	2012
生命 -イノチ- (Seimei -Inochi-)	Musical theater Soukyuu no Fafner ending theme	2012
Always 好きだよ (Always Suki da yo)	Television broadcast a-GENERATION ending theme	2013
僕じゃない (Boku Janai)	Anime television series Valvrave the Liberator ending theme	2013
ANGEL	Anime television series Coppelion opening theme	2013
遠くまで (Tookumade)	Anime television series Coppelion ending theme	2013
バイバイオーライ (Bye Bye All Right)	Anime television series Coppelion final episode ending theme	2013
シドニア (Sidonia)	Anime television series Knights of Sidonia opening theme	2014
This is LOVE	PlayStation Portable Visual Novel Game Gakuen K -Wonderful School Days- opening theme	2014
春夏秋冬 (Shunkashuto)	PlayStation Portable Visual Novel Game Gakuen K -Wonderful School Days- ending theme	2014
Different colors	Anime film K: Missing Kings theme song	2014
イグジスト (Exist)	Anime television series Soukyuu no Fafner EXODUS opening theme	2015
暗夜航路 (Anya Kouro)	Anime television series Soukyuu no Fafner EXODUS ending theme	2015
その時、蒼穹へ (Sono Toki, Soukyuu e)	Anime television series Soukyuu no Fafner EXODUS insert song	2015
愛、ひと欠片 (Ai, Hito Kakera)	Anime film Sidonia no Kishi Movie theme song	2015
騎士行進曲 (Kishi Koushinkyouku)	Anime television series Sidonia no Kishi: Daikyuu Wakusei Seneki opening theme	2015
DEAD OR ALIVE	Anime television series Soukyuu no Fafner EXODUS 2nd opening theme	2015
ホライズン (Horizon)	Anime television series Soukyuu no Fafner EXODUS 2nd ending theme	2015
KIZUNA	Anime television series K: Return of Kings final episode ending theme	2015
僕は僕であって (Boku wa Boku de Atte) [feat. fripSide]	Anime television series Ajin: Demi-Human 2nd season 1st opening theme	2016
全力☆Summer! (Zenryoku☆Summer!)	Anime television series Aho Girl opening theme	2017
乙女のルートはひとつじゃない! (Otome no Route wa Hitotsu Janai!)	Anime television series Otome Gēmu no Hametsu Furagu Shika Nai Akuyaku Reijō ni Tensei Shiteshimatta... opening theme	2020
