= 0G (album) =

Studio album by Two-Mix
- Released: October 11, 2001
- Recorded: 2001
- Studio: Warner Music Recording Studio
- Genres: J-pop; electropop
- Length: 60:36
- Language: Japanese
- Label: WEA Japan
- Producer: Two-Mix

Two-Mix chronology
20010101 (2001)	0G (2001)	BPM "Dance Unlimited" II (2002)

Singles from 0G
- 1. "Gravity Zero" Released: August 29, 2001

0G (pronounced "Zero-G") is the seventh and final studio album by J-pop duo Two-Mix, released by WEA Japan on October 11, 2001. It includes the single "Gravity Zero".

The album peaked at No. 24 on Oricon's weekly albums chart.

== Track listing ==
All lyrics are written by Shiina Nagano; all music is composed by Minami Takayama; all music is arranged by Two-Mix.

No.	Title	Length
1.	"Discharge"	5:56
2.	"La Vie en Rose"	5:04
3.	"Gravity Zero"	5:48
4.	"Ne!! (Run Love Run)"	5:09
5.	"Goin' My Way"	4:14
6.	"Paradise Girl!!"	4:54
7.	"Separate Carnival"	6:16
8.	"Holy Night Destiny (Boy Meets Girl)"	5:18
9.	"Forever"	6:38
10.	"Into the Wind"	5:20
11.	"Discharge Next" (Secret Track)	5:59
Total length:		60:36

== Charts ==
Chart (2001)	Peak position
Japanese Albums (Oricon)	24
