= Fantastix =

Studio album by Two-Mix
- Released: December 22, 1997
- Recorded: 1996–1997
- Genre: J-pop; electropop; anison
- Length: 57:02
- Language: Japanese
- Label: King Records
- Producer: Two-Mix

Two-Mix chronology
BPM "Dance Unlimited" (1997)	Fantastix (1997)	Fantastix II Next (1998)

Singles from Fantastix
- 1. "True Navigation" Released: July 4, 1997; 2. "Summer Planet No. 1" Released: September 3, 1997; 3. "Living Daylights" Released: November 21, 1997

Fantastix is the fourth studio album by J-pop duo Two-Mix, released by King Records on December 22, 1997. It includes the singles "True Navigation" (image song from the Japanese dub of The X-Files season 3), "Summer Planet No. 1" (commercial image song for Tokyo Telemessage's "P-Press"), and "Living Daylights" (ending theme of TV Asahi's broadcast of NBA Tonight). The album also includes the song "Break", which was featured in the anime series Case Closed.

The album peaked at No. 11 on Oricon's weekly albums chart. It was also certified Gold by the RIAJ.

== Track listing ==
All lyrics are written by Shiina Nagano; all music is composed by Minami Takayama; all music is arranged by Two-Mix.

No.	Title	Length
1.	"Believe My Brave Heart" (Instrumental)	2:56
2.	"True Navigation"	4:14
3.	"White Reflection"	4:45
4.	"Summer Planet No. 1"	4:33
5.	"Missing You"	4:42
6.	"Beat 'Break'" (Instrumental)	1:33
7.	"Break"	4:32
8.	"Burning"	4:10
9.	"Can't Stop Love ♥♥"	4:36
10.	"Winter Planet No. 1"	4:33
11.	"Wake"	5:40
12.	"Living Daylights"	6:00
13.	"Believe My Brave Heart"	4:48
Total length:		57:02

== Charts ==
Chart (1997)	Peak position
Japanese Albums (Oricon)	11

== Certification ==
Region	Certification	Certified units/sales
Japan (RIAJ)	Gold	200,000^{^}
^{^} Shipments figures based on certification alone.
