= Engage Planet Kiss Dum =

Japanese anime television series

- Kiss Dum: Engage Planet

キスダム -ENGAGE planet- (Kiss Dum)
- Created by: Yasuchika Nagaoka; Satelight
- Anime television series
- Directed by: Yasuchika Nagaoka (Chief); Hidekazu Satō; Hiroyuki Kanbe (Assistant)
- Produced by: Kazuaki Shimamura; Daiki Hasebe
- Written by: Yasuchika Nagaoka
- Music by: II Mix Delta
- Studio: Satelight
- Licensed by: NA: Maiden Japan
- Original network: TV Tokyo, TV Setouchi, TV Osaka, TV Hokkaido
- Original run: April 3, 2007 – September 25, 2007
- Episodes: 26

Engage Planet Kiss Dum (キスダム -ENGAGE planet-, Kisu Damu: Engēji Puranetto) is a mecha anime series, directed by Yasuchika Nagaoka and Eiichi Satō, and produced by Aniplex and Satelight. It premiered in Japan from April 3, 2007, on TV Tokyo. Bandai Visual USA originally held the license, but was never released before they shutdown. Maiden Japan have rescued the license and plan to release it in North America by 2018.

== Storyline ==
In A.D. 2031, humans are enjoying a prosperous existence until strange life forms called Hadeans appear. They suddenly begin to multiply and assault the human population. As a countermeasure, mankind organizes the N.I.D.F. (Neo International Defense Force) to investigate the Hadeans and protect themselves.

A fighter pilot, Aiba Shu, begins to become involved in the battle against the life-forms. Rurika Yuno, one of Earth's foremost scientists, investigates the Hadeans and hears rumors about the "Book of the Dead." What is the secret of this book, and what relation does it have to the Hadeans?

Now, the fight for mankind's survival begins.

== Plot ==
The Story begins with the wreckage of a cruise ship in the Pacific Ocean. A young Iburi Kyouka is stranded on a rock. A few years later, a research team is sent to the Pacific Ocean in search of The Book of the Dead. After Yuno finds out that the Book of the Dead is somewhere close by, the Hadeans begin their attack on the planet. Swarms of Beezlebugs form into batches and then large monsters (Hadeans) appear. Aiba Shu who was in custody gets released and is ordered to work with his team to eliminate the Hadeans. Yuno and Nanao find the Book of the Dead and is caught by Kyouka's private agents. Aiba's Viper becomes unusable due to the Beezlebugs and if forced to eject his armor. He gets beaten by a ground Hadean and dies when Yuno reaches him. Yuno becomes upset and stabs Aiba with the Book of the Dead.

== Cast ==
- Daisuke Ono as Shū Aiba
- Nana Mizuki as Yuno Rukina
- Katsuyuki Konishi as Masaki
- Kenji Nomura as Roki Demon
- Marina Inoue as Ton Kirī
- Aya Endo as Noa Rukina
- Akeno Watanabe as Iera Hamon
- Ryoka Yuzuki as Rei
- Saori Yumiba as Kyōka Iburi
- Satomi Akesaka as Varda
- Shinji Kawada as Aguri Io
- Yuka Iguchi as Vaire
- Yuko Kaida as Itsuki Sasara
- Yuichi Nakamura as Syuu Nanao
- Akiko as Kazuki
- Eiji Miyashita as Nasser (ep 6)
- Haruka Tomatsu as Mayura (ep 1)
- Mai Kadowaki as Lyla (ep 6)
- Mikako Takahashi as Miki
- Natsuki Mori as Lalah (ep 6)
- Reiko Sasakawa as Sharon (ep 6)
- Shintaro Asanuma as Ueno
- Susumu Akagi as Haji (ep 6)
- Takashi Oohara as Abd (ep 6)
- Tarô Yamaguchi as Ral (ep 6)
- Tsuguo Mogami as Malcolm (ep 6)

== Theme music ==
=== Opening theme ===
- "Toki wo Koete (時空を超えて)" by II MIX⊿DELTA (eps 2-21)
- "A Runner At Daybreak" by II MIX⊿DELTA (ep 22-26)

=== Ending theme ===
- "Toki wo Koete (時空を超えて)" by II MIX⊿DELTA (ep 1)
- "Kimi ga Iru Kagiri (君がいる限り)" by Stephanie (eps 2-18)
- "because of you" by Stephanie (eps 19-26)
