= BPM 150 Max =

Studio album by Two-Mix
- Released: November 21, 1996
- Recorded: 1996
- Genres: J-pop; electropop; anison
- Length: 54:40
- Language: Japanese
- Label: King Records
- Producer: Two-Mix

Two-Mix chronology
Two-(Re)Mix (1996)	BPM 150 Max (1996)	BPM "Best Files" (1997)

Singles from BPM 150 Max
- 1. "Love Revolution" Released: July 24, 1996; 2. "Rhythm Generation" Released: October 2, 1996

BPM 150 Max is the third studio album by J-pop duo Two-Mix, released by King Records on November 21, 1996. It includes the singles "Love Revolution" (theme from the TV Asahi drama Kirara) and "Rhythm Generation" (opening theme from the TV Tokyo anime series Godzilla Kingdom).

The album peaked at No. 2 on Oricon's weekly albums chart, becoming the duo's highest-charting album. It was also certified Gold by the RIAJ.

== Track listing ==
All lyrics are written by Shiina Nagano; all music is composed by Minami Takayama; all music is arranged by Two-Mix.

No.	Title	Length
1.	"Prelude"	1:32
2.	"Love Revolution Max"	3:52
3.	"Trust Me"	5:18
4.	"Rhythm Generation"	4:14
5.	"Stayin' Alive Max"	4:51
6.	"Dance September Love"	4:57
7.	"Meeting on the Planet"	4:56
8.	"I'm in Love"	4:31
9.	"From Far Distance"	4:43
10.	"Maximum"	5:24
11.	"X'mas Dreams" (Special Track)	4:43
12.	"Rhythm Emotion Pure" (Special Track)	5:39
Total length:		54:40

== Charts ==
Chart (1996)	Peak position
Japanese Albums (Oricon)	2

== Certification ==
Region	Certification	Certified units/sales
Japan (RIAJ)	Gold	200,000^{^}
^{^} Shipments figures based on certification alone.
