= Last Impression =

Single by Two-Mix

from the album Dream Tactix
- Language: Japanese
- B-side: "Just Communication II Next Type II"
- Released: July 23, 1998
- Recorded: 1998
- Genre: J-pop; electropop; anison
- Length: 7:36
- Label: King Records
- Composer: Minami Takayama
- Lyricist: Shiina Nagano
- Producer: Two-Mix

Two-Mix singles chronology
"Beat of Destiny" (1998)	"Last Impression" (1998)	"Truth (A Great Detective of Love)" (1998)

"Last Impression" is the 12th single by J-pop duo Two-Mix, released by King Records on July 23, 1998. Composed by the duo of Shiina Nagano and Minami Takayama, the song was used as the ending theme of the anime theatrical compilation Gundam Wing: Endless Waltz Special Edition. It was also the duo's final single under King Records.

The single peaked at No. 8 on Oricon's weekly singles chart and sold over 107,000 copies.

== Track listing ==
All lyrics are written by Shiina Nagano. All music is arranged by Two-Mix.

8 cm CD
No.	Title	Music	Length
1.	"Last Impression"	Minami Takayama	7:36
2.	"Last Impression" (Radio Edit)	Takayama	4:39
3.	"Just Communication II Type II"	Kōji Makaino	4:35
4.	"Last Impression" (Radio Edit/Instrumental)		4:41

== Charts ==
Chart (1998)	Peak position
Japanese Oricon Singles Chart	8

== Other versions ==
The duo recorded an orchestral mix with Masamichi Amano and Warsaw National Philharmonic Orchestra on the 1998 self-cover album Baroque Best.

== Cover versions ==
- Chihiro Yonekura covered the song on the 2022 various artists album Two-Mix Tribute Album "Crysta-Rhythm".
