= Jibaku-kun =

Japanese manga series

- First tankōbon volume cover

ジバクくん
- Genre: Adventure, fantasy
- Manga
- Written by: Ami Shibata
- Published by: Enterbrain
- Magazine: Famitsu Bros.
- Original run: May 1998 – December 2000
- Volumes: 6
- Anime television series

Twelve Worlds Story
- Directed by: Iku Suzuki
- Produced by: Michiko Tabata; Naoki Nakamura
- Written by: Atsuhiro Tomioka
- Music by: Cher Watanabe; Kan Sawada
- Studio: Trans Arts
- Original network: TXN (TV Tokyo)
- Original run: October 5, 1999 – March 28, 2000
- Episodes: 26
- icon

Jibaku-kun (ジバクくん) is a Japanese manga series written and illustrated by Ami Shibata. It was adapted into a 26-episode anime television series called Jibaku-kun: Twelve Worlds Story (ジバクくん TWELVE WORLDS STORY, Jibaku-kun: Tuerubu Wārudo Sutōrī) which was broadcast on TV Tokyo from October 5, 1999, to March 28, 2000. In some markets, the series is known as Bucky: The Incredible Kid, Bucky: Searching for World 0 or simply Bucky.

== Story ==
The Parallel Planet is a realm situated "above the sky and down the sea". This world is geometrically divided into twelve distinct lands, arranged in the manner of a clock face. At its center stands the Needle Tower, also known as World Zero, a place where time remains static. Each of the twelve surrounding worlds is protected by a guardian known as a Great Child, who is always accompanied by a spirit—an explosive, spherical companion that aids in defeating creatures called Troublemonsters.

The story follows Baku, an ambitious boy whose goal is world domination. His journey begins when En, the Great Child of World One, entrusts him with his Spirit and a G.C. Watch, propelling Baku on an adventure across the twelve worlds to fulfill his dream at any cost.

== Characters ==
=== Great Children ===
In the International versions of the anime (Brazil and Spanish-speaking Latin America), the Enoki Films licensing, and other dubbed versions of the anime, their Japanese names are changed, while others retain their original name.

- Baku (爆; Bucky in some versions) – 1st World (Primas) (voiced by Akira Ishida)
- Pink (ピンク, Pinku) – 2nd World (Secandas) (voiced by Tomoko Kawakami)
- Kai (カイ) – 3rd World (Trius) (voiced by Hiroshi Kamiya)
- D'Artagnan (ダルタニアン, Darutanian) – 4th World (Tetras) (voiced by Tomoko Ishimura)
- Ali Babah (アリババ, Ari Baba) – 5th World (Pentas) (voiced by Yuu Asakawa)
- Live (ライブ, Raibu) – 6th World (Hexas) (voiced by Akiko Hiramatsu)
- Ranmaru (乱丸) – 7th World (Seteras) (voiced by Kenichi Suzumura)
- Lucy (ルーシー, Rūshī) – 8th World (Octas) (voiced by Junko Noda)
- Dead (デッド, Deddo) – 9th World (Novas) (voiced by Megumi Ogata)
- Hayate (ハヤテ) – 10th World (Dicas) (voiced by Koji Tsujitani)
- Jeanne (ジャンヌ, Jannu) – 11th World (Undinus) (voiced by Misa Watanabe)
- Utsuroh (現郎, Utsurō) – 12th World (Doidicus, manga only)
- Baku Senior (爆の父, Baku no Chichi; or Bucky Senior) – 12th World (Doidicus, anime only)

=== Great Soldiers ===
- En (炎) – 1st World (voiced by Yasunori Matsumoto)
- Silva (シルバ, Shiruba) – 2nd World (voiced by Minami Takayama)
- Funen (フネン) / Geki (激) – 3rd World
- Hyoh (雹, Hyō) – 10th World (manga) or 12th World (anime) (voiced by Showtaro Morikubo)

=== Spirits ===
- Jibaku (ジバク) – 1st World
- Bumby (バーンビ, Bānbi) – 2nd World
- Bakuzan (バクザン) – 3rd World
- Count Bucklets (バクレツ, Bakuretsu) – 4th World
- Hibana (ヒバナ) – 5th World
- Buzz (バズ, Bazu) – 6th World
- Rekka (烈火) – 7th World
- Bacucci (バクチ, Bakuchi) – 8th World
- Jubaku (ジュバク) – 9th World
- Thunder (サンダー, Sandā) – 10th World
- Colonel Dann (ダン, Dan) – 11th World
- King Jibaku (ジバク王, Jibaku-Ō; or Jibaking) – 12th World (voiced by Masaharu Sato)

=== Enemies ===
- Challa (チャラ, Chara) – one of the main villains (manga only).
- Zan (斬) – main villain (anime only). (voiced by Toshiyuki Morikawa)
- Troublemaking Monsters – normal monsters that become dangerous.

=== Monster-guides ===
- Chicky (チッキー, Chikkī) – monster-guide of Baku , it is similar to a gigantic chick that grew suddenly. It was found in Rockside City.
- Nyafun (にゃふーん, Nyafūn) – a gigantic cat, the monster-guide of Pink.
- Manta (マンタ) – a purple gigantic ray, the monster-guide of Kai.
- Jiraiya (ジライヤ) – a yellow gigantic toad, the monster-guide of Ranmaru (manga only).
- Dick (ディック, Dikku) – a purple whale, the monster-guide of Lucy (anime only).
- Doberg (ドーベルグ, Dōberugu) – a gigantic dog, the monster-guide of Jeanne.

=== Others ===
- Princess Amano (天, Amano) – the sleeping princess of the Needle Tower and twin sister of En.
- Shin (真) – Amano and En's former loyal bodyguard (manga only).
- Ouroboros (ウロボロス, Uroborosu) – the guardian of the Flammable Dreams Island and the judge of the Great Soldiers Exam (manga only).
- Shizuma (閑), Tatsuya (タツヤ), Benji (ベンジー, Benjī), and Teru (テル) – they were former Great Children who failed the Great Soldier Exam and were trapped on the Flammable Dreams Island (manga only).

== Episodes ==
No.	Title	Directed by	Written by	Original release date
1	"Dream Conquest: My Name is Baku!"; Transliteration: "Yume seiha ore no na wa Baku!" (Japanese: 夢制覇・オレの名は爆!)	Shigeki Hatakeyama	Atsuhiro Tomioka	October 5, 1999
2	"Dreaming GC Pink!"; Transliteration: "Yumemiru GC Pinku!" (Japanese: 夢見るGC・ピンク!)	Makoto Sokuza	Natsuko Takahashi	October 12, 1999
3	"What Do Fairies Dream About?"; Transliteration: "Yōsei ga miru yume wa?" (Japanese: 妖精が見る夢は?)	Ryō Miyata	Toshiyasu Nagata	October 19, 1999
4	"Wings of Dreams Drive Monster"; Transliteration: "Yume no tsubasa doraibu monsutā" (Japanese: 夢の翼・ドライブモンスター)	Kazu Yokota	Tsutomu Nagai	October 26, 1999
5	"Dream Chaser GC Kai!"; Transliteration: "Yumeoibito GC Kai!" (Japanese: 夢追い人・GCカイ!)	Kazunobu Fuseki	Kōji Miura	November 2, 1999
6	"Proof of a Dream, GC's Pride!"; Transliteration: "Yume no akashi GC no hokori!" (Japanese: 夢の証・GCの誇り!)	Yūji Yanase	Kōichi Mizuide	November 9, 1999
7	"Achieve Your Dreams: My Moves!"; Transliteration: "Yume o kiwamero ore no waza!" (Japanese: 夢を極めろ・オレの技!)	Shigeki Hatakeyama	Atsuhiro Tomioka	November 16, 1999
8	"Beyond My Father's Dreams! GC D'Artagnan!"; Transliteration: "Chichi no yume koete! GC Darutanian!" (Japanese: 父の夢こえて! GCダルタニアン!)	Mitsuo Kusakabe	Kiyoko Yoshimura	November 23, 1999
9	"Reach Spaak! The Bridge of Dreams"; Transliteration: "Honō ni todoke! Yume no kakehashi" (Japanese: 炎にとどけ! 夢のかけ橋)	Yukihiro Shino	Kōji Miura	November 30, 1999
10	"Steal the Dreams: GC Ali Baba!"; Transliteration: "Yume o nusume GC Ari Baba!" (Japanese: 夢を盗め・GCアリババ!)	Kyōsuke Mikuriya	Natsuko Takahashi	December 7, 1999
11	"Blighted Love: The Monster's Dreams"; Transliteration: "Hiren monsutā no yume" (Japanese: 悲恋・モンスターの夢)	Kazunobu Fuseki	Atsuhiro Tomioka	December 14, 1999
12	"Spirit's Dream, Mill's Dream"; Transliteration: "Seirei no yume Miru no yume" (Japanese: 精霊の夢・ミルの夢)	Mitsuo Kusakabe	Kiyoko Yoshimura	December 21, 1999
13	"GS Hail: Dreams Severed!"; Transliteration: "GS hyō yume o tatsu!" (Japanese: GS雹・夢を断つ!)	Kazu Yokota	Kōichi Mizuide	December 28, 1999
14	"Dream Tapestry: The Girl Silva"; Transliteration: "Yume tsuzureori shōjo Shiruba" (Japanese: 夢つづれおり・少女シルバ)	Hiroyuki Tsuchiya	Toshiyasu Nagata	January 4, 2000
15	"The Evil Dream: His Name Is Zan!"; Transliteration: "Ashiki yume sonona wa Zan!" (Japanese: 悪しき夢・その名は斬!)	Daisuke Takashima	Atsuhiro Tomioka	January 11, 2000
16	"GC Gig: Sing to Your Dreams!"; Transliteration: "GC raibu yume ni utau!" (Japanese: GCライブ・夢に歌う!)	Kyōsuke Mikuriya	Kōji Miura	January 18, 2000
17	"Awaken From a Dream: GC Dead!"; Transliteration: "Yume kara samete GC Deddo!" (Japanese: 夢からさめて・GCデッド!)	Kazu Yokota	Toshiyasu Nagata	January 25, 2000
18	"GC Ranmaru: Running to Your Dream!"; Transliteration: "GC ranmaru yume ni hashiru!" (Japanese: GC乱丸・夢に走る!)	Mitsuo Kusakabe	Natsuko Takahashi	February 1, 2000
19	"The Enemy Is a Pirate: GC Lucy!"; Transliteration: "Teki wa kaizoku GC Rūshī!" (Japanese: 敵は海賊・GCルーシー!)	Daisuke Takashima	Kiyoko Yoshimura	February 8, 2000
20	"Flying to Your Dreams: GC Hayate!"; Transliteration: "Yume ni tobu GC Hayate!" (Japanese: 夢に翔ぶ・GCハヤテ!)	Toshinori Narita	Kiyoko Yoshimura	February 15, 2000
21	"Frozen Dreams: GC Jeanne!"; Transliteration: "Kōritsuita yume GC Jannu!" (Japanese: 凍りついた夢・GCジャンヌ!)	Kazunobu Fuseki	Natsuko Takahashi	February 22, 2000
22	"The Inflammable Island of Dreams & Geki!"; Transliteration: "Yume no funenbutsu shima to geki!" (Japanese: 夢の不燃物島と激!)	Mitsuo Kusakabe	Kiyoko Yoshimura	February 29, 2000
23	"Dream Storyteller: King Jibaku"; Transliteration: "Yume no katari be Jibaku-ō!" (Japanese: 夢のかたりべ・ジバク王!)	Daisuke Takashima	Atsuhiro Tomioka	March 7, 2000
24	"Fallen Angel Hail: Confounding Dreams!"; Transliteration: "Datenshi hyō yume o madowasu!" (Japanese: 堕天使雹・夢を惑わす!)	Yukihiro Shino	Kiyoko Yoshimura	March 14, 2000
25	"Shoot the Flames! Shout to Your Dreams"; Transliteration: "Honō o ute! Yume ni sakebu" (Japanese: 炎を撃て! 夢に叫ぶ)	Ken'ichi Kasai	Natsuko Takahashi	March 21, 2000
26	"A Dream Is a Beginning"; Transliteration: "Yume sore wa hajimari" (Japanese: 夢・それは始まり)	Daisuke Takashima	Atsuhiro Tomioka	March 28, 2000
