= Dream Tactix =

Studio album by Two-Mix
- Released: September 23, 1998
- Recorded: 1997–1998
- Genre: J-pop; electropop; anison
- Length: 56:20
- Language: Japanese
- Label: King Records
- Producer: Two-Mix

Two-Mix chronology
Fantastix II Next (1998)	Dream Tactix (1998)	Baroque Best (1998)

Singles from Dream Tactix
- 1. "Beat of Destiny" Released: May 8, 1998; 2. "Last Impression" Released: July 23, 1998

Dream Tactix is the fifth studio album by J-pop duo Two-Mix, released as the duo's final album under King Records on September 23, 1998. It includes the singles "Beat of Destiny" (ending theme of the TV Asahi variety show U-chan Nan-chan no Honō no Challenger Kore ga Dekitara Hyakuman-en!!) and "Last Impression" (ending theme of the anime theatrical compilation Gundam Wing: Endless Waltz Special Edition).

The album peaked at No. 6 on Oricon's weekly albums chart.

== Track listing ==
All lyrics are written by Shiina Nagano; all music is composed by Minami Takayama; all music is arranged by Two-Mix.

No.	Title	Length
1.	"Winter Love Express"	6:45
2.	"Beat of Destiny"	6:13
3.	"Time Distortion EX"	4:32
4.	"Last Impression"	7:36
5.	"Time Distortion DX"	5:00
6.	"Thousand Nights '98 Selection"	5:12
7.	"Milky Road"	5:12
8.	"Callin' You '98 Selection"	4:38
9.	"I Love You '98 Selection"	5:26
10.	"White Reflection Pure"	5:46
Total length:		56:20

== Charts ==
Chart (1998)	Peak position
Japanese Albums (Oricon)	6
