= Truth (A Great Detective of Love) =

Single by Two-Mix

from the album Rhythm Formula
- Language: Japanese
- B-side: "Key of Love (A Detective in Love)"
- Released: November 26, 1998
- Recorded: 1998
- Studio: Warner Music Recording Studio
- Genre: J-pop; electropop; anison
- Length: 5:36
- Label: WEA Japan
- Composer: Minami Takayama
- Lyricist: Shiina Nagano
- Producer: Two-Mix

Two-Mix singles chronology
"Last Impression" (1998)	"Truth (A Great Detective of Love)" (1998)	"Body Makes Stream" (1999)

Alternative cover
- Limited edition "Ocean" cover

Music videos
- "Truth (A Great Detective of Love)" on YouTube

"Truth (A Great Detective of Love)" is the 13th single by J-pop duo Two-Mix. Released on November 26, 1998, it was the duo's first single under Warner Music Japan, following their split from King Records. Composed by the duo of Shiina Nagano and Minami Takayama, the song was used as the opening theme of episodes 124–142 of the anime TV series Case Closed.

The single peaked at No. 3 on Oricon's weekly singles chart, becoming the duo's highest-charting single and final top-10 single. It sold over 228,710 copies and was the duo's final single to be certified Gold by the RIAJ.

== Track listing ==
All lyrics are written by Shiina Nagano. All music is composed by Minami Takayama. All music is arranged by Two-Mix.

8 cm CD
No.	Title	Length
1.	"Truth (A Great Detective of Love)"	5:36
2.	"Key of Love (A Detective in Love)"	4:26
3.	"Truth (A Great Detective of Love)" (Instrumental)	5:36

== Charts ==
Chart (1998)	Peak position
Japanese Oricon Singles Chart	3

== Certification ==
Region	Certification	Certified units/sales
Japan (RIAJ)	Gold	200,000^{^}
^{^} Shipments figures based on certification alone.

== Other versions ==
The duo recorded an orchestral ballad version with Orchestre Chimérique on the 1998 self-cover album Baroque Best. An alternate version titled "Truth (Duet with Conan)" on Rhythm Formula features Takayama singing as Conan Edogawa. An English-language version was recorded on the 2000 self-cover album BPM Cube. A remix of the song was included on the 2001 remix album BPM "Dance Unlimited" II.

== Cover versions ==
- Valshe covered the song on her 2015 album Kimi e no Uso.
- Reol covered the song on her 2015 album Gokusaishoku.
- Nano covered the song on the 2022 various artists album Two-Mix Tribute Album "Crysta-Rhythm".
