= White Reflection =

Single by Two-Mix

from the album BPM "Best Files"
- Language: Japanese
- B-side: "Burning"
- Released: January 15, 1997
- Recorded: 1996
- Genre: J-pop; electropop; anison
- Length: 4:48
- Label: King Records
- Composer: Minami Takayama
- Lyricist: Shiina Nagano
- Producer: Two-Mix

Two-Mix singles chronology
| "Rhythm Generation" (1996) | "White Reflection" (1997) | "True Navigation" (1997) |

Music videos
- "White Reflection" (Short Ver.) on YouTube

"White Reflection" is the sixth single by J-pop duo Two-Mix, released by King Records on January 15, 1997. Composed by the duo of Shiina Nagano and Minami Takayama, the song was used as the ending theme of the anime OVA series Gundam Wing: Endless Waltz.

The single peaked at No. 6 on Oricon's weekly singles chart. It sold over 156,000 copies and was certified Gold by the RIAJ.

== Music video ==
The music video featuring anime versions of Nagano and Takayama was included in QuickTime format on the bonus CD-ROM of the duo's 1997 compilation album BPM "Best Files". It was directed by Kazuya Murata and animated by OLM, Inc., with character designs by Yuriko Chiba. The video was re-released in the 2001 DVD White Reflection: The Movie. It was remastered in high definition and included on Blu-ray in the limited edition release of the 2021 compilation album Two-Mix 25th Anniversary All Time Best.

== Track listing ==
All lyrics are written by Shiina Nagano. All music is composed by Minami Takayama. All music is arranged by Two-Mix.

8 cm CD
| No. | Title | Length |
|---|---|---|
| 1. | "White Reflection" | 4:48 |
| 2. | "Burning" | 4:18 |
| 3. | "White Reflection" (Original Karaoke) | 4:48 |
| 4. | "Burning" (Original Karaoke) | 4:17 |

== Charts ==
| Chart (1997) | Peak position |
|---|---|
| Japanese Oricon Singles Chart | 6 |

== Certification ==
| Region | Certification | Certified units/sales |
|---|---|---|
| Japan (RIAJ) | Gold | 200,000^{^} |
^{^} Shipments figures based on certification alone.

== Other versions ==
Remixes of the song were released on the albums Fantastix, BPM "Dance Unlimited", and Dream Tactix.

== Cover versions ==
- Yoko Ishida covered the song on the 2001 various artists album Ultra Anime Eurobeat Series Mega Max.
- Ai Tokunaga covered the song on her 2004 album Scarlet.
- Hikaru Midorikawa, who voiced Heero Yuy in Gundam Wing, covered the song on the 2022 various artists album Two-Mix Tribute Album "Crysta-Rhythm".
