= True Navigation (song) =

Single by Two-Mix

from the album Fantastix
- Language: Japanese
- B-side: "Wake"
- Released: June 4, 1997
- Recorded: 1997
- Genre: J-pop; electropop
- Length: 4:14
- Label: King Records
- Composer: Minami Takayama
- Lyricist: Shiina Nagano
- Producer: Two-Mix

Two-Mix singles chronology
| "White Reflection" (1997) | "True Navigation" (1997) | "Summer Planet No. 1" (1997) |

"True Navigation" is the seventh single by J-pop duo Two-Mix, released by King Records on June 4, 1997. Composed by the duo of Shiina Nagano and Minami Takayama, the song was used as an image song in the Japanese dub of The X-Files season 3.

The single peaked at No. 7 on Oricon's weekly singles chart. It sold over 142,000 copies and was certified Gold by the RIAJ.

== Track listing ==
All lyrics are written by Shiina Nagano. All music is composed by Minami Takayama. All music is arranged by Two-Mix.

8 cm CD
| No. | Title | Length |
|---|---|---|
| 1. | "True Navigation" | 4:14 |
| 2. | "Wake" | 5:40 |
| 3. | "True Navigation" (Original Karaoke) | 4:14 |
| 4. | "Wake" (Original Karaoke) | 5:40 |

== Charts ==
| Chart (1997) | Peak position |
|---|---|
| Japanese Oricon Singles Chart | 7 |

== Certification ==
| Region | Certification | Certified units/sales |
|---|---|---|
| Japan (RIAJ) | Gold | 200,000^{^} |
^{^} Shipments figures based on certification alone.

== Other versions ==
An English-language version of the song was recorded on the duo's 2000 self-cover album BPM Cube.
