= Rhythm Emotion =

Single by Two-Mix

from the album BPM 143
- Language: Japanese
- B-side: "Endless Love"
- Released: November 22, 1995
- Recorded: 1995
- Genre: J-pop; electropop; anison
- Length: 3:55
- Label: King Records
- Composer: Minami Takayama
- Lyricist: Shiina Nagano
- Producer: Two-Mix

Two-Mix singles chronology
"Just Communication" (1995)	"Rhythm Emotion" (1995)	"Try (Return to Yourself)" (1996)

Music videos
- "Rhythm Emotion" (Gundam Wing OP) on YouTube
- "Rhythm Emotion" (lyric video) on YouTube

"Rhythm Emotion" is the second single by J-pop duo Two-Mix, released by King Records on November 22, 1995. Composed by the duo of Shiina Nagano and Minami Takayama, the song was used as the second opening theme of the anime series Mobile Suit Gundam Wing.

The single peaked at No. 8 on Oricon's weekly singles chart, becoming the duo's first top-10 single. It sold over 353,000 copies and was certified Gold by the RIAJ.

== Track listing ==
All lyrics are written by Shiina Nagano. All music is composed by Minami Takayama. All music is arranged by Two-Mix.

8 cm CD
No.	Title	Length
1.	"Rhythm Emotion"	3:55
2.	"Endless Love"	6:15
3.	"Rhythm Emotion" (Original Karaoke)	3:56
4.	"Endless Love" (Original Karaoke)	6:12

== Chart position ==
Chart (1995)	Peak position
Japanese Oricon Singles Chart	8

== Certification ==
Region	Certification	Certified units/sales
Japan (RIAJ)	Gold	200,000^{^}
^{^} Shipments figures based on certification alone.

== Other versions ==
Remixes of the song were released on the albums Two-(Re)Mix, BPM 150 Max, and BPM "Dance Unlimited". The duo recorded an orchestral mix with Les Solistes de Versailles on the 1998 self-cover album Baroque Best. An English-language version was recorded on the 2000 self-cover album BPM Cube.

== Cover versions ==
- Move covered the song on their 2011 cover album anim.o.v.e. 03.
- Yui Sakakibara covered the song on her 2015 cover album Love × Cover Songs 2.
- Nagi Yanagi covered the song on the 2022 various artists album Two-Mix Tribute Album "Crysta-Rhythm".
