= Just Communication =

Single by Two-Mix

from the album BPM 132
- Language: Japanese
- B-side: "Second Impression"
- Released: April 29, 1995
- Recorded: 1995
- Genre: J-pop; electropop; anison
- Length: 4:20
- Label: King Records
- Composer: Kōji Makaino
- Lyricist: Shiina Nagano
- Producer: Two-Mix

Two-Mix singles chronology
"Just Communication" (1995)	"Rhythm Emotion" (1995)

Music videos
- "Just Communication" (Gundam Wing OP) on YouTube
- "Just Communication" (lyric video) on YouTube

"Just Communication" is the debut single by J-pop duo Two-Mix, released by King Records on April 29, 1995. Composed by Shiina Nagano and Kōji Makaino, the song was used as the first opening theme of the anime series Mobile Suit Gundam Wing, and marked the band's breakthrough into the mainstream.

Both the song and its B-side "Second Impression" originally had Two-Mix credited as songwriters due to a "Virtual Artist" (ヴァーチャルアーティスト, Vācharu Ātisuto) policy imposed by ISM Artist (株式会社イズム・アーティスト, Kabushiki-gaisha Izumu Ātisuto), the duo's management at the time.

The single peaked at No. 23 on Oricon's weekly singles chart. It sold over 264,000 copies and was certified Gold by the RIAJ.

== Track listing ==
All lyrics are written by Shiina Nagano. All music is arranged by Two-Mix.

8 cm CD
No.	Title	Music	Length
1.	"Just Communication"	Kōji Makaino	4:18
2.	"Second Impression"	Minami Takayama	4:51
3.	"Just Communication" (Original Karaoke)		4:18
4.	"Second Impression" (Original Karaoke)		4:51

== Chart position ==
Chart (1995)	Peak position
Japanese Oricon Singles Chart	23

== Certification ==
Region	Certification	Certified units/sales
Japan (RIAJ)	Gold	200,000^{^}
^{^} Shipments figures based on certification alone.

== Other versions ==
Remixes of the song were released on the albums Two-(Re)Mix and BPM "Dance Unlimited". An alternate version titled "Just Communication II" was recorded on the 1998 EP Fantastix II Next. An English-language version was recorded on the 2000 self-cover album BPM Cube.

== Cover versions ==
- Sachi & Nao covered the song on the 1998 soundtrack album Super Robot Taisen F Kanketsu-hen: Vocal & Arrange Collection Gold.
- Yoko Ishida covered the song on the 2000 various artists album Para Para Max: The Power of New Animation Songs.
- A Thai version was released on CD and cassette in 2001, on the album Highlight Cartoon 9 Songs Hit - Famous Cartoon Party. as "Fai nai Fon" (ไฟในฝน).
- Sanae Kobayashi covered the song on ShiinaTactix-Sana.K's 2008 album BPM 151 Tactix
- Minami Kuribayashi covered the song on the 2009 various artists album Gundam Tribute from Lantis.
- Yoko Hikasa covered the song on her 2014 live album Glamorous Live.
- Nami Tamaki covered the song on her 2014 cover album NT Gundam Cover.
- Sayaka Sasaki covered the song on her 2016 album Sayakaver.
- Hiroko Moriguchi covered the song on her 2019 album Gundam Song Covers.
- Peaky P-key covered the song on the 2021 soundtrack album D4DJ Groovy Mix Cover Tracks Vol. 1.
- Angela covered the song on the 2022 various artists album Two-Mix Tribute Album "Crysta-Rhythm".
