= Kōji Makaino =

Japanese musician (born 1948)

Kōji Makaino (馬飼野 康二, Makaino Kōji; born 26 January 1948) is a Japanese pop music composer, arranger, and musician. He is the elder brother of composer Shunichi Makaino.

== Biography ==
Makaino was born in the city of Toyohashi, in Aichi Prefecture. His father Noboru was a music-lover and amateur composer, and he got Kōji to become familiar with musical instruments. He, his father, and his brother played together as a tango band. After graduating from Aichi Prefectural Commercial High School in Toyohashi, he studied music at the Naomi College of Music before dropping out in 1967 join a group called "Blue Sharm." The group only issued four singles, and broke up in 1970.

Since 1972, when he arranged for Hideki Saijo's album Chance wa Ichido, he has worked in composition and arrangement. He has been active composing Kayōkyoku; idol songs; enka; film, TV drama, and anime soundtracks; and commercial songs; among others. Besides his hundreds of compositions, he was in charge of soundtrack for a number of anime series, most notably The Rose of Versailles, and a few live action series and films. He has worked under the pseudonyms Mark Davis, Jimmy Johnson, Michael Korgen, from the fact that since the late 1970s, many foreign artists have been hired on TV CMs, and because he wanted to show he had a foreign style in some ways.

== Compositions ==
Makaino's compositions are:

== Filmography ==
Films, anime series, etc. where Makaino has been credited for the soundtrack:

=== Live action films ===
- The Happiness of the Katakuris
- The Audition
- Seito Shokun!
- Ai to Makoto

=== Anime television ===
Listed by the year they started airing.

- Shin Ace wo Nerae! (1978)
- The Rose of Versailles (1979)
- Combat Mecha Xabungle (1982)
- Creamy Mami, the Magic Angel (1983, arrangement only)
- Persia, the Magic Fairy (1984)
- Pastel Yumi, the Magic Idol (1986)
- Bubblegum Crisis (1987, original video animation)
- The Burning Wild Man (1988)
- The Adventures of Hutch the Honeybee (1989 remake)
- Yadamon (1992)
- Nintama Rantarō (1993)

=== Anime films ===
- Nintama Rantarō: Invincible Master of the Dokutake Ninja (2024)

=== TV drama series ===
- Supergirl
- Hana no Joshikō Sentokatorea Gakuen
- Getsuyō Drama Land
- Ten Made Agare

=== Original Video Animation ===
- Cream Lemon (1984–1993)
