= Two-Mix =

Japanese pop duo

- Origin: Japan
- Genres: J-pop; electropop; techno; dance-pop
- Years active: 1995–2009; 2013–present
- Labels: King Records (1995–1998); Warner Music Japan (1998–2002); Little Station (2003); Geneon Entertainment (2005–2007); ShiinaTactix-Music (2009–present)
- Members: Minami Takayama; Shiina Nagano
- Past members: Joe Rinoie

Two-Mix (temporarily known as II MIX⊿DELTA) is a Japanese pop duo formed in 1995 by Minami Takayama (vocals and composer) and Shiina Nagano (synthesizer, composer and lyricist). Their style is fast electronic pop.

== History ==
They met in the early 1990s. Minami, already well-established as a voice actress, was in the indie band Re-X and met Shiina through a friend. Minami released a solo album in 1992, Endless Communication which Shiina contributed to. They formed a group together Es Connexion and released an album. In 1995 they formed Two-Mix.

They have been featured in series such as Mobile Suit Gundam Wing and Detective Conan. In the latter, they appear as themselves in a storyline, in which they are kidnapped and saved by Conan Edogawa and his friends. Minami voices Conan in the anime adaptation of the manga.

In 1999, Two-Mix produced Miru Takayama (a cousin of Minami) and in 2000 Miru and Minami formed M*TWO-MinaMiru-.

In 2005, Minami and Shiina were joined by Joe Rinoie as an additional singer and composer, changing the group's name to II MIX⊿DELTA for a limited time.

In 2008, Shiina started his solo music project ShiinaTactix-Music, featuring different female vocalists, Sanae Kobayashi, Yoko Hikasa and Mutsumi Tamura.

In 2013, Two-Mix released a digital download single "T-R-Y: Next / Across The End: Platinum Stream" and Shiina composed the music for a song "Rhythm Linkage" with Yoko Hikasa in her album "Hikasa Yoko Collaboration Album Glamorous Songs".

In 2014, Shiina composed the music for a song "Reboot Tactics" with Kaori Sadohara (from Sweet Arms) in their album "Trigger".

In 2020, a 25th anniversary project was announced, the main focus being an all time best compilation album that was released in February, 2021.

== Discography ==
- BPM 132 (1995)
- BPM 143 (1996)
- BPM 150 Max (1996)
- Fantastix (1997)
- Dream Tactix (1998)
- Rhythm Formula (1999)
- 0G (2001)
