= Minami Takayama =

Japanese voice actress and narrator

- 高山 みなみ
- Born: Izumi Arai (新井 泉); May 5, 1964 (age 62); Adachi, Tokyo, Japan
- Occupations: Voice actress; narrator; singer
- Years active: 1987–present
- Agent: 81 Produce
- Notable work: Detective Conan as Conan Edogawa; Ranma ½ as Nabiki Tendo; Kiki's Delivery Service as Kiki and Ursula; Danganronpa series as Hajime Hinata/Izuru Kamukura; Fullmetal Alchemist: Brotherhood as Envy; Kid Icarus: Uprising as Pit and Dark Pit; Honkai Impact 3rd as Fu Hua and Herrscher of Sentience
- Height: 156 cm (5 ft 1 in)
- Spouse: Gosho Aoyama (m. 2005; div. 2007)
- Relatives: Miru Takayama (cousin); Hisashi Shinma (uncle)
- Musical career
- Genre: J-pop
- Instrument: Vocals

Minami Takayama (高山 みなみ, Takayama Minami; born Izumi Arai (新井 泉, Arai Izumi), May 5, 1964) is a Japanese voice actress, narrator and singer who is currently affiliated with 81 Produce. She is also the main vocalist of Two-Mix and ES CONNEXION when it was active. Her uncle was former New Japan Pro-Wrestling managing director Hisashi Shinma.

Takayama is best known for her roles in Detective Conan as Conan Edogawa, Kiki's Delivery Service as both Kiki and Ursula, Ranma ½ as Nabiki Tendo, Moomin as Moomin, Yaiba as Yaiba Kurogane, Shaman King as Hao Asakura, Nintama Rantarō as Rantarō Inadera, Danganronpa series as Hajime Hinata/Izuru Kamukura, Fullmetal Alchemist: Brotherhood as Envy, and Honkai Impact 3rd as Fu Hua.

== Career ==
=== Early life and career ===
From an early age, Takayama studied ballet, Japanese dance, and vocal music. When she was a child, her sense of justice was so strong that it was written on her report card. She wanted to become a police officer, which she thought she was suited for, and she thought that ventriloquism would be necessary for being a traffic safety guider, so she joined Himawari Theatre Group in 1978 when she was in junior high school, and stayed there for four years. In reality, however, Takayama's parents wanted her to enter the entertainment industry, and she felt as if she was being forced to follow the rails laid out for her, and the ventriloquism was just a reason for her to study acting, not something she came up with. When she was in high school, she won a radio disc jockey contest and thought about becoming a DJ because of her love of radio and fascination with free banter and voice work.

=== As a voice actress ===
After graduating from Adachi Nishi High School in Tokyo, not knowing how to become a DJ, Takayama enrolled in the theater department of Nihon Kogakuin College to continue her acting career, but she became worried about her future and dropped out to stop acting altogether. At one point, she was working at an office, but when a caller praised her voice, she decided to become a voice actor at the age of 22. In 1985, she joined the voice acting division of Sun House Music, but after that, she met a manager who asked her if she wanted to work as a voice actress, and she joined 81 Produce, where she was told that if she didn't make any progress in two of her three years as a rookie, she should give up. She decided to try to bear fruit in one year.

Initially, Takayama auditioned for the role of the heroine, but even though she tried to read the lines in a cute way, she was told by different sound directors to "be more like a girl." After failing three times in a row, she consulted with her manager and decided to audition for the role of a boy, thinking that heroine might not be suitable for her. She made her debut in 1987 as a female student in Campus Special Investigator Hikaruon. After that, she started getting boy roles and got her first starring role as Youichi Ajiyoshi in Mister Ajikko the third time around.

In 1989, she was chosen to play both Kiki and Ursula in the animated film Kiki's Delivery Service, and the film was a hit. She tried to refuse the role because it was decided at short notice and she was too new to take responsibility, but Hayao Miyazaki told her not to worry because he would take responsibility. Despite this, there was a time when the only regular role she played was Nabiki Tendo in the Ranma ½ series, which depressed her, but she pulled herself together and started working part-time in her neighborhood. In the 1990s, she began to play the main and major characters in many works, mainly boys, such as Moomin (as Moomin), Magical Taruruto-kun (as Honmaru Edojō), and Yaiba (as Yaiba), and her popularity became firmly established. In particular, her leading roles as Rantarō Inadera in Nintama Rantarō and Conan Edogawa in Detective Conan have lasted for more than 30 years since they were first broadcast in 1993 and 1996, respectively, and Takayama's voice has become recognized by a wide range of generations. In 2005, she was chosen to play Suneo's mom in the renewed Doraemon anime, in 2007 she voiced Kitarō in the fifth series of GeGeGe no Kitarō, and in 2010 she voiced Taiki Kudō in Digimon Fusion.

=== Music career ===
Takayama is also active in music as ES CONNEXION, Two-Mix, Miru Takayama with TWO-MIX, and M★TWO-MinaMiru-, a unit with her cousin Miru Takayama. She has sung the theme songs of Mobile Suit Gundam Wing, and has also composed music. In the 81st episode of Detective Conan (broadcast on November 17, 1997), she appeared as a character with Shiina Nagano as TWO-MIX themselves, and also sang the opening theme song for the anime. In addition, in 2005, she brought in Joe Rinoie to work on the theme song for the anime Engage Planet Kiss Dum in 2007 as the unit II MIX⊿DELTA.

== Awards ==
In 2011, Takayama won the Synergy Award at the 5th Seiyu Awards.

On January 9, 2017, she was picked 7th in the TV Asahi 3-hour special that voted 200 popular voice actors.

== Personal life ==
Takayama was married to manga artist Gosho Aoyama on May 5, 2005 but they divorced on December 10, 2007. However, their relationship as "the author of the original story of Detective Conan and the lead voice actress" has continued to be good, and they are not estranged even now. Takayama has been keeping Aoyama's cat, Kite, which was given to her at the time of marriage, and she reports on Kite's good health on her blog.

During the opening speech of Detective Conan: Quarter of Silence an earthquake of magnitude 4 struck the stage. Takayama made a quick decision and said in Conan's voice, "Calm down, earthquakes! Don't worry, Conan is here." to calm the children.

== Filmography ==
=== TV dramas ===
2026	Vivant (season 2) as AI Hayato (voice), a supercomputer under the service of the Beppan group

=== Live-action film ===
2026	Vivant: The Movie as AI Hayato (voice), a supercomputer under the service of the Beppan group

=== Television animation ===
1987	Mister Ajikko as Yōichi Ajiyoshi
1988	Little Lord Fauntleroy as Roy; Oishinbo as Terue Yumemi
1989	Dash! Yonkuro as Aoi Hyūga; Ranma ½ as Nabiki Tendo; City Hunter 3 as Mei Asaoka
1990	Magical Taruruto-kun as Honmaru Edojō; Tanoshii Moomin Ikka as Moomin
1991	Anime Himitsu no Hanazono as Colin Craven and Patty; Holly the Ghost as Kaori
1992	Cooking Papa as Makoto Araiwa, Miyuki Araiwa; Hime-chan's Ribbon as Shintarō Kobayashi, Ichiko Kamikura
1993	Kenyu Densetsu Yaiba as Yaiba Kurogane; Nintama Rantarō as Rantarō Inadera
1994	Magic Knight Rayearth as Ascot; YuYu Hakusho as Mukuro
1996 - Ongoing	Detective Conan as Conan Edogawa, Shinichi Kudo (Childhood), Minami Takayama (Herself, episode 81 and 82), Aoko Nakamori (episode 219, OVA 4) & Goro
1996	The Vision of Escaflowne as Dilandau Albatou, Celena Schezar, Chid Freid
1998	Berserk as Griffith (young); Gasaraki as Rin Ataka
1999	Jibaku-kun as Silver (young); Pocket Monsters as Hiroshi; Starship Girl Yamamoto Yohko as Yohko Yamamoto
2000	Android Kikaider as Chigusa Sakamoto; Descendants of Darkness as Hijiri Minase; Shinzo as Mushra, Mushrambo; One Piece as Hamu
2001	Cyborg 009 as Artemis; Project ARMS as Kei Kuruma; Shaman King as Hao Asakura; The SoulTaker as Mio Date; Touch as Alice; Kirby: Right Back at Ya! as Knuckle Joe
2002	Ghost in the Shell: Stand Alone Complex as Kuroha; Monkey Typhoon as Mion; Pocket Monsters: Episode Gold & Silver as Hiroshi; Case Closed as Aoko Nakamori
2003	Astro Boy as Shin'ichi; Origami Warriors as Setsuna Inami; Pocket Monsters Side Stories as Hiroshi
2004	Ghost in the Shell: S.A.C. 2nd GIG as Chai; Kyo Kara Maoh! as Anissina von Karbelnikoff; Maria-sama ga Miteru as Former Rosa Gigantea; Tokusou Sentai Dekaranger as Assassinian Jingi (episode 41)
2005	Black Cat as Train Heartnet (younger); Digital Monster X-Evolution as Dorumon, Dorugamon, DoruGreymon, Alphamon; Doraemon Mrs. Honewaka
2006	Jyu-Oh-Sei as Thor; Majin tantei Neuro as aya asheia; D.Gray-man as Anita; Ghost Slayers Ayashi as Kyōsai Kawanabe; Kenichi: The Mightiest Disciple as Kisara Nanjō
2007	Claymore as Irene; GeGeGe no Kitaro as Kitarō
2008	Megumi as Megumi Yokota; Mobile Suit Gundam 00 as Kati Mannequin; Mobile Suit Gundam 00 Second Season as Kati Mannequin and Red Haro; Porphy no Nagai Tabi as Rebecca
2009	GA Geijutsuka Art Design Class as Sasamoto-sensei; Fullmetal Alchemist: Brotherhood as Envy; Lupin III vs Detective Conan as Conan Edogawa
2010	HeartCatch PreCure! as Dark Precure; Digimon Xros Wars as Taiki Kudou
2011	Pocket Monsters Best Wishes! as Luke; Tales of Symphonia: The United World as Mithos Yggdrasill; Digimon Xros Wars: Toki wo Kakeru Shounen Hunter-tachi as Taiki Kudou
2012	Senki Zesshō Symphogear as Kanade Amō; Pretty Rhythm: Dear My Future as Yong Hwa
2014	Magic Kaito 1412 as Conan Edogawa
2015	One-Punch Man as Child Emperor
2016	Erased as Sachiko Fujinuma; Danganronpa 3: The End of Hope's Peak High School as Hajime Hinata/Izuru Kamukura
2017	Little Witch Academia as Nelson
2019	I'm From Japan as Hinomoto; One-Punch Man 2 as Child Emperor
2021	Kiyo in Kyoto: From the Maiko House as Kenta; Shaman King (2021) as Hao Asakura; Zombie Land Saga Revenge as Light Oozora
2022	Tomodachi Game as Manabu-kun
2024	Ranma ½ as Nabiki Tendō
2025	Yaiba: Samurai Legend as Yaiba Kurogane
2026	Red River as Yuri's mother (episode 1); Star Detective Precure! as Conan Edogawa (episode 18)

=== Anime films ===
1989	Kiki's Delivery Service as Kiki, Ursula
1997	Detective Conan: The Time-Bombed Skyscraper as Conan Edogawa
1998	Detective Conan: The Fourteenth Target as Conan Edogawa
1999	Detective Conan: The Last Wizard of the Century as Conan Edogawa
2000	Detective Conan: Captured in Her Eyes as Conan Edogawa; Escaflowne as Dilandau Albatou
2001	Detective Conan: Countdown to Heaven as Conan Edogawa; Princess Arete as Ampule
2002	Detective Conan: The Phantom of Baker Street as Conan Edogawa
2003	Detective Conan: Crossroad in the Ancient Capital as Conan Edogawa
2004	Detective Conan: Magician of the Silver Sky as Conan Edogawa; Konjiki no Gash Bell: 101 Banme no Mamono as Gash's Mother
2005	Detective Conan: Strategy Above the Depths as Conan Edogawa; Digital Monster X-Evolution as Dorumon
2006	Detective Conan: The Private Eyes' Requiem as Conan Edogawa; Doraemon: Nobita's Dinosaur 2006 as Suneo's Mama
2007	Detective Conan: Jolly Roger in the Deep Azure as Conan Edogawa; Highlander: The Search for Vengeance as Joe
2008	Detective Conan: Full Score of Fear as Conan Edogawa; GeGeGe no Kitaro: Nippon Bakuretsu as Kitaro
2009	Detective Conan: The Raven Chaser as Conan Edogawa
2010	Detective Conan: The Lost Ship in the Sky as Conan Edogawa; Mobile Suit Gundam 00 the Movie: Awakening of the Trailblazer as Kati Mannequin
2011	Detective Conan: Quarter of Silence as Conan Edogawa
2012	Detective Conan: The Eleventh Striker as Conan Edogawa
2013	Detective Conan: Private Eye in the Distant Sea as Conan Edogawa; Lupin the 3rd vs. Detective Conan: The Movie as Conan Edogawa; Little Witch Academia as Nelson
2014	Detective Conan: Dimensional Sniper as Conan Edogawa; Expelled from Paradise as Veronica Kulikova
2015	Detective Conan: Sunflowers of Inferno as Conan Edogawa; Love Live! The School Idol Movie as Female Singer
2016	Detective Conan: The Darkest Nightmare as Conan Edogawa
2017	Detective Conan: Crimson Love Letter as Conan Edogawa
2018	Detective Conan: Zero the Enforcer as Conan Edogawa
2019	Detective Conan: The Fist of Blue Sapphire as Conan Edogawa
2021	Detective Conan: The Scarlet Bullet as Conan Edogawa
2022	Lonely Castle in the Mirror as Masamune; Detective Conan: The Bride of Halloween as Conan Edogawa
2023	Detective Conan: Black Iron Submarine as Conan Edogawa
2024	Nintama Rantarō: Invincible Master of the Dokutake Ninja as Rantarō Inadera; Detective Conan: The Million-dollar Pentagram as Conan Edogawa

=== OVA ===
1987	Gakuen Tokuso Hikaruon as Student
1991	Slow Step as Minatsu Nakazato
1994	Cosmic Fantasy as Yū
1995	Elementalors as Saori
1997	Starship Girl Yamamoto Yohko as Yohko Yamamoto
1998	Psychic Force as Emilio Michaelov; Tekken: The Motion Picture as Nina Williams, Young Kazuya, Jin Kazama
2001	Hikarian as Nozomi
2002	Macross Zero as Nora Polyansky
2003	.hack//GIFT as Mia
2007	Kyo Kara Maoh! R as Anissina von Karbelnikoff; Tsubasa: Tokyo Revelations as Nataku, Kasumizuki
2009	Cobra the Space Pirate: Time Drive as Emeralda

=== Dubbing roles ===
1987	Stand by Me as Chris Chambers (River Phoenix)
1989	The Simpsons as Adil Hoxha (Tress MacNeille); The Land Before Time as Littlefoot (Gabriel Damon)
1990	The NeverEnding Story II: The Next Chapter as Atreyu (Kenny Morrison); RoboCop 2 as Hob (Gabriel Damon); Twin Peaks as Donna Hayward (Lara Flynn Boyle)
1992	Back to the Future Part II as Video Game Boy #1 (Elijah Wood) (TV Asahi edition); Lorenzo's Oil as Lorenzo Odone (Zack O'Malley Greenburg)
1993	Boy Meets World as Shawn Hunter (Rider Strong)
1994	The Good Son as Mark Evans (Elijah Wood); The War as Stu (Elijah Wood); Sister Act 2: Back in the Habit as Rita Watson (Lauryn Hill)
1995	Pocahontas as Nakoma (Michelle St. John)
1996	Flipper as Sandy Ricks (Elijah Wood); The Craft as Nancy Brown (Fairuza Balk)
1997	The Full Monty as Nathan Schofield (William Snape)
1998	An American Tail: The Treasure of Manhattan Island as Cholena; Wild Things as Kelly Van Ryan (Denise Richards)
2000	200 Cigarettes as Lucy (Courtney Love); Almost Famous as Penny Lane (Kate Hudson); Charlie's Angels as Alex Munday (Lucy Liu); Music of the Heart as Lexi (Kieran Culkin)
2002	Ballistic: Ecks vs. Sever as Agent Sever (Lucy Liu); Ghost World as Enid (Thora Birch); Resident Evil as Rain (Michelle Rodriguez); The Scorpion King as Cassandra (Kelly Hu)
2003	Charlie's Angels: Full Throttle as Alex Munday (Lucy Liu)
2005	The Fast and the Furious as Letty Ortiz (Michelle Rodriguez) (TV Asahi edition)
2006	Monster House as Dustin James (Mitchel Musso); The Texas Chainsaw Massacre: The Beginning as Alex (Cyia Batten)
2007	Firehouse Dog as Shane Fahey (Josh Hutcherson)
2014	My Little Pony: Friendship Is Magic as Daring Do (Chiara Zanni); Chef as Percy (Emjay Anthony)
2015	Moomins on the Riviera as Moomin; Exodus: Gods and Kings as Malak (Issac Andrews); The Divergent Series: Insurgent as Johanna Reyes (Octavia Spencer)
2016	The Divergent Series: Allegiant as Johanna Reyes (Octavia Spencer)
2018	The House with a Clock in Its Walls as Louis Barnavelt (Owen Vaccaro)
2022	Ghostbusters: Afterlife as Podcast (Logan Kim); Jurassic World Dominion as Soyona Santos (Dichen Lachman)
2023	The Exploits of Moominpappa: Adventures of a Young Moomin as Moomintroll and young Pappa
2024	Ghostbusters: Frozen Empire as Podcast (Logan Kim)
2025	Jurassic World Rebirth as Nina (Philippine Velge)

=== Tokusatsu ===
2004	Tokusou Sentai Dekaranger as Assassinian Jingi (episode 41)

=== Video games ===
1992	Tengai Makyō II: Manjimaru as Matsuri
1993	Tengai Makyō: Fuun Kabukiden as Matsuri
1995	Linda Cube as Linda
1996	PoPoLoCrois as Pietro; Psychic Force as Emilio Michaelov; Virtua Fighter 3 as Pai Chan
1997	Linda Cube Again as Linda; Lego Island as Pepper Roni
1998	Jade Cocoon as Mahbu; Psychic Force 2012 as Emilio Michaelov
2000	Digimon World as Protagonist; Boku no Natsuyasumi as Guts
2001	Virtua Fighter 4 as Pai Chan
2002	.hack//Infection as Mia; .hack//Mutation as Mia; .hack//Outbreak as Mia
2003	.hack//Quarantine as Mia; Mega Man X7 as Axl; Tales of Symphonia as Mithos Yggdrasill
2004	Gungrave: Overdose as Spike Hubie; Mega Man X: Command Mission as Axl; Mega Man X8 as Axl
2005	Super Robot Wars Alpha 3 as Ruach Ganeden
2006	Virtua Fighter 5 as Pai Chan
2007	Case Closed: The Mirapolis Investigation as Conan Edogawa; Tales of Fandom Vol.2 as Mithos Yggdrasill
2008	Super Smash Bros. Brawl as Pit
2012	Dead or Alive 5 as Pai Chan; Project X Zone as Pai Chan; Kid Icarus: Uprising as Pit, Black Pit; Danganronpa 2: Goodbye Despair as Hajime Hinata/Izuru Kamukura
2013	Danganronpa 1.2 Reload as Hajime Hinata/Izuru Kamukura
2014	Dengeki Bunko: Fighting Climax as Pai Chan; Super Smash Bros. for Nintendo 3DS and Wii U as Pit and Dark Pit; Granblue Fantasy as Sarasa/Threo
2015	Project X Zone 2 as Pai Chan
2017	Danganronpa V3: Killing Harmony as Hajime Hinata (Trial ver. only); Senki Zesshō Symphogear XD Unlimited as Kanade Amō; Little Witch Academia: Chamber of Time as Nelson; Honkai Impact 3rd as Fu Hua (Fuka) (2017 - ongoing)
2018	Super Smash Bros. Ultimate as Pit, Black Pit, Mii Brawler, Mii Swordfighter, Mii Gunner
2020	Fist of the North Star Legends ReVIVE as Pai Chan
2022	Kirby and the Forgotten Land as Dream Discoveries Tour announcer
2023	Arknights as Degenbrecher
2027	Danganronpa 2×2 as Hajime Hinata

=== Drama CD ===
1991	Video Girl Ai as Ai Amano
1992	Ginnoyuki Furufuru as Takashi Sakakibara
1994	Fushigi Yūgi as Nuriko; Rurouni Kenshin as Myōjin Yahiko
1997	Red River as Yuri Suzuki
2000	M to N no Shōzō as Natsuhiko Amakusa; Chrono Crusade as Child Chrono
2001	Angel Heart as Li Xiang Ying; Shaman King as Hao Asakura; W Juliet as Ito Miura
2004	Kyo Kara Maoh! as Anissina von Karbelnikoff

=== Original net Animation ===
2008	Megumi as Megumi Yokota
