= Gundam War Collectible Card Game =

Collectible card game

- Designers: Kentaro Kawashima
- Publishers: Bandai
- Genres: Mecha; Real Robot; Military Science Fiction; Card Collection
- Players: 2 (may be adjusted to multiplayer play)
- Setup time: < 3 minutes
- Playing time: ~ 15 minutes
- Chance: Some
- Age range: 12 and up
- Skills: Card playing Arithmetic; Simple text reading skills

Gundam War: Mobile Suit Gundam the Card Game (ガンダムウォー：機動戦士ガンダム・ザ・カードゲーム) also known simply as Gundam War (ガンダムウォー) is an out-of-print collectible card game based on the Gundam anime series produced by Bandai. Players can simulate battles in the anime series. The game is designed for 2 players, though there may be different fan-created multiplayer rules. This game is sometimes confused with the Gundam M.S. War Trading Card Game, since both are published by Bandai and are based on the Gundam series.

== History ==
Gundam War is a collectible card game based on the Gundam anime series. It was first released in Japan in February 1999, and later a Traditional Chinese version and an English version was released in early 2005. The English version of the game was discontinued after three sets. The Japanese version of the game was discontinued in 2018, after 45 sets.

== Gameplay ==
Each player starts with a deck, called the "Nation Pile", which has exactly 50 cards. Players take turns drawing from their Nation Pile at the beginning of their turn, except the very first turn of the game. They battle against each other with Unit cards that they control, with excess damage sending proportionate numbers of cards, along with any discarded cards, to the "Discard Pile". When a player has depleted his/her Nation, s/he has lost the game. There are six different colors of cards, representing different factions of various series, and five different types of cards.

=== Colors and Factions ===
In the Japanese card game, the following are the six colors and their related factions.

Blue: This color is generally effective at quick production, defense, and recovery. (Similar to White in Magic: the Gathering) This color includes many of the protagonists and their respective factions from Universal Century, which includes:

- Earth Federation (Gundam), and its related force (excluding forces related to Titans)
- AEUG of Mobile Suit Zeta Gundam and Mobile Suit Gundam ZZ
- Londo Bell of Char's Counterattack
- League Militaire of Mobile Suit Victory Gundam

Green: This color is known for damaging effects from Command cards, and low-cost Units. (Similar to Red in Magic: the Gathering) The factions included in this color include, but are not limited to:

- Zeon of Mobile Suit Gundam
- Delaz Fleet of Gundam 0083
- Oldsmobile of Mobile Suit Gundam F90
- All cards from Mobile Suit Gundam 00 aside from Celestial Being

Black: This color is known for effects that affect all cards on the field, direct removal of cards, and large-scale effects at a cost. (Similar to Black in Magic: the Gathering) The factions include in this color include:

- Titans of Mobile Suit Zeta Gundam
- New Desides of Gundam Sentinel
- Zanscare Empire of Mobile Suit Victory Gundam
- Units in Mobile Suit Gundam 00 aside from animation (other than partial units from Celestial Being).

Red: Particularly specializing in negation of the opponent's card effects, (Similar to Blue in Magic: the Gathering) the factions included in this color are:

- Axis/Neo Zeon of Mobile Suit Zeta Gundam, Mobile Suit Gundam ZZ, and Char's Counterattack
- Crossbone Vanguard of Gundam F91 and Crossbone Gundam
- Jupiter Empire from Crossbone Gundam
- Mafty of Hathaway's Flash

Brown: This color is previously known for effects that affect the Discard Pile and Junkyard. After the participation of G Gundam. also its unique attacking style of the Mobile Fighters. The factions include in this color include:

- All cards from Turn A Gundam
- All cards from After War Gundam X
- All cards from Mobile Fighter G Gundam

White: This color is known for their high-cost-high-powered Unit cards and the variations of Command cards. The factions include in this color include:

- All cards from Mobile Suit Gundam Wing series
- All cards from Mobile Suit Gundam SEED series

Purple: This color is divided into two types, although both types are known as having high flexibility that can used in any decks, but since the introduction of Mobile Suit Gundam 00, the nature of purple has been switched, currently it is divided into two types:
-The first purple type is card can be played, regardless of current color generation. Some of the most powerful cards in the game belong to this color. These types of card are similar to Artifact cards in Magic: the Gathering.

- Neutral forces in any Gundam series, or mobile supporting weapons.
- Mobile weapons that belongs to no timeline, like Perfect Gundam.
- Some famous scenes in Gundam series that may, or may not, belongs to a single series.

-The second type needs purple generation (or without them but with harsh conditions) and a different generation to play it, it provides high flexibility, high power and high tactical variations through having tougher requirement. The factions include in this color include:

- Celestial Being in Mobile Suit Gundam 00.
- All cards from Mobile Suit Gundam AGE series

It is noted that cards from the SD Gundam series may belong to any of the colours, currently at least one SD Gundam Units exists in Blue, White, and Purple.

Also, there is a new card called "Dual Cards". This type of card has two specific colors as its cost. They represent moves involving more than one force in the animations. However, even not involved by more than one force, units from A-Laws and Celestial Being, are mostly in dual. Those cards needs two different generations (or even three) to play, some of the units might need one designated color (Green or Black).

=== Unit cards ===
Unit cards are the representations of the Mobile Suits, Mobile Armors, Cruisers, and Colonies in the anime series. They are the main ways to battle and deal damage to the opponent's Nation, as they are the only type of cards that can enter into the Battle Area. Only one Unit card can be played per turn.

=== Character cards ===
Character cards are the representations of the characters in the anime series. They are set onto a Unit and bring extra effects and battle modifications to the Set-On Unit, through there are characters that can be set onto other types of cards. Only one Character card can be played per turn, and no two characters with the same name can be in play by either player at any one time.

=== Command cards ===
Command cards are cards that carry out effects, usually depicting scenes in the anime series. Commands go to the Junkyard after their resolution. There is no limit to the Command cards that can be played per turn, providing the text on the card permits it.

This type of card is similar to Instant and Sorcery cards in the Magic: the Gathering game.

=== Operation cards ===
Operation cards remain in play, usually affecting the game state, or capable of activating an effect at any time. They also depict their respective event or battle in the anime series. Only one Operation card can be played per turn. Some operation card are needed to set on the other designated cards rather than on the play area.

This type of card is similar to Enchantment in the Magic: the Gathering game.

=== Generation cards ===
This type of card produces a "Nation Power" (similar to Mana in many other card games) that one can use to play other cards. There are two types of this card: "Basic G" cards and "Special G" cards. Generation cards usually depict resources, soldiers, and supporters in the anime series.

Basic Generation cards usually have effects of "Producing a NP for certain color", and one can have any amount of it in a deck, while Special Generation cards have diverse effects and a maximum of 6 special Generation of the same name can be put into a deck.

This is similar to Land cards in Magic: the Gathering.

== Releases ==
=== Japan ===
The largest release and most expansions have been delivered into the Japanese market. Gundam War made its debut in February 1999 with 200 different cards. The first expansion set was released in June 1999, adding another 100 cards. Mobile Suit Gundam The 08MS Platoon and ∀ Gundam cards were released in a 49 card special set in September 1999. Another expansion in October 1999 would add another 130 cards. In February 2000, another set containing Mobile Suit Gundam 0083 was released adding another 204 cards to the game. In June 2000, 80 cards were released which debuted Gundam W. In August 2000, another set adding 224 more cards were released. In December 2000, cards featuring Mobile Suit Gundam 0080 were released in a 66 card set. In February 2001, another 224 card set was released. In April 2001, a 108 card set featuring Mobile Suit Gundam F91 and Mobile Suit Gundam V debuted. In August 2001, another expansion set containing 220 cards was released. In November 2001, a new set containing 240 cards with 84 new cards was released, including cards featuring "Mobile Suit Gundam: Char's Counterattack". February 2002 saw another 207 card set. Gundam War CCG was discontinued in Japan in 2018.

== Tournaments ==
In 2013 Taiwan's official website for Gundam War continued to list sanctioned tournaments for players in the Gundam NEX-A format with various tournaments. The Taiwan tournaments used errata that were unchanged since 2002, with the rulebook being based on the 2001 Japanese rules.

== Reception ==
Anime Fringe magazine reviewed the game Gundam: MS WAR which was a separate game from the other US released Gundam War, back in 2001 and criticized its appearances, illogical and unfinished rules that need to be worked out to play the game and called it a blatant cash grab from Bandai.

== Game Online ==
Android and iOS launch game called Gundam Cross War (ガンダムクロスウォ) is a collectible card game

== Successor and legacy ==
Gundam War Nex-A (ガンダムウォーネグザ) is sequel from previous first after officially ended in 2018 after completing 45 sets replace as new successor

== See Also ==
- Gundam M.S. War Trading Card Game
- Mobile Suit Gundam 0079: Card Builder
- Mobile Suit Gundam 0083 Card Builder
- Mobile Suit Gundam U.C. Card Builder
- Gundam Chronicle Battleline
- Gundam Card Game

== Links ==
- Official Japanese Bandai Gundam War Page
- Baron's Gundam War Comet, a known English GW fan-site with Japanese cards translation
- Japanese Gundam War Wiki
