= New Mobile Report Gundam Wing: Frozen Teardrop =

Novel series

- Frozen Teardrop first volume cover

新機動戦記ガンダムW Frozen Teardrop (Shin Kidō Senki Gandamu W Frozen Teardrop)
- Genre: Mecha, Military science fiction
- Created by: Hajime Yatate; Yoshiyuki Tomino
- Serial novel
- Written by: Katsuyuki Sumisawa
- Illustrated by: Sakura Asagi (characters); MORUGA (mecha)
- Published by: Kadokawa Shoten
- Magazine: Gundam Ace
- Original run: August 2010 – November 2015
- Volumes: 13

New Mobile Report Gundam Wing: Frozen Teardrop (新機動戦記ガンダムW Frozen Teardrop, Shin Kidō Senki Gandamu Wingu Furozen Tiadoroppu) is a serial novel written by Katsuyuki Sumisawa. The illustrations were done by Sakura Asagi, who also provided artwork for the novel version of New Mobile Report Gundam Wing: Endless Waltz and the manga version of New Mobile Report Gundam Wing: Blind Target. It was serialized in Gundam Ace between August 2010 and November 2015 and was collected in thirteen volumes. It follows the story decades after Endless Waltz.

== Setting ==
Frozen Teardrop is set during the Mars Century, the era that has succeeded the After Colony era, on the terraformed Mars. Since the formation of the young Mars Colony and its government, trouble has been brewing within it with the assassination of its president, Milliardo Peacecraft. In the present day, ESUN President Dorothy T. Catalonia authorizes the beginning of "Operation Mythos" to resolve the problems on Mars – which primarily involves the assassination of Relena Peacecraft.

Concurrent to the events of Mars Century are flashbacks during After Colony, told through Preventer agent Kathy Po, the daughter of Sally Po. The flashbacks detail events in After Colony leading up to the events of the series, including the origins and backgrounds of OZ Leader Treize Khushrenada and Gundam pilot Heero Yuy.

== Plot ==
Main story

In the year MC-0022, after receiving authorization from the President of the Earth Sphere Unified Nation to initiate "Operation Mythos", Master Chang, a veteran operator of the Preventers, orders Lieutenant Colonel Kathy Po to bring several critical items to his base at the Preventers' Mars Branch, North Polar Cap Base. These include a memory chip sent by the President, and three files downloaded from the History Bank.

The activation of Operation Mythos requires the awakening of the so-called "Princess Aurora", who lies in cryogenic sleep. The files are said to be essential to awaken them. Soon after, an elderly man identifying himself as Father Maxwell arrives at the base, carrying a fourth file. With all four files now gathered, Master Chang proceeds to awaken Heero Yuy, a Gundam pilot from the After Colony (AC) era, who has been in cryogenic sleep.

Heero, who once vowed to "never kill again", is now given a new mission: To assassinate Relena Peacecraft, the Second President of the Mars Federation Government who is now considered the greatest threat to the Earth Sphere.

However, just as the Preventers begin preparations for Relena's assassination, Catherine, the younger sister of Professor W, steals a Gundanium-made mobile suit called "Prometheus" and goes rogue, intending to fulfill Relena's dream of true pacifism on her own terms. To pursue her, Heero is dispatched alongside Duo, the son of Father Maxwell. At the same time, Trowa Phobos, who had been rescued and trained as a pilot by Doctor T and his team, is also tracking Catherine. In an effort to stop Catherine's recklessness, Master Chang launches in the Epyon Bai, but is ambushed by Zechs, the leader of the Republic of Lanagrin, a nation hostile to the Mars Federation. Zechs pilots the Gundam Epyon, leading to a chaotic three-way battle.

Catherine, piloting Maganac Mobile Dolls, attempts to hold off Heero, Trowa Phobos, and Duo during their pursuit. Though all the Maganac units are ultimately destroyed, she succeeds in escaping and successfully rendezvouses with Naina and Mille—the children of Milliardo (Zechs) and Mars Federation Presidential Aide Noin. Together, they succeed in stealing the Prometheus. Just then, the battlefield is suddenly interrupted by the appearance of 500 unmanned Mars Suits—an autonomous force sent by the Mars Federation to annihilate both the Preventers and Zechs. Zechs withdraws from the battlefield, while the Preventers' units are saved from destruction by the timely intervention of Tallgeese Heaven, piloted by "The Wind of Cyrene." However, Heero collapses from sheer exhaustion, having reached his physical limit.

As Duo continues his pursuit, Naina launches the 909th Special Independent Unit of the Mars Federation Army, known as the "Merciless Fairies", a squad directly under her command. The battle escalates further with the arrival of Catherine piloting Prometheus. Despite the fierce combat, Duo and his allies manage to defeat the Merciless Fairies, and thanks to the intervention of Professor W, who pilots the mobile suit "Snow White" in place of the incapacitated Heero, they succeed in recapturing Prometheus. However, the victory is short-lived: their mothership, the Schwarzhook II, is hacked and seized, leading to the capture of Doctor T, Heero, and the others on board.

On their way to Relena City, the capital of the Mars Federation, to rescue Heero and the others, Professor W, Duo, and Phobos encounter a battle between Naina, Mille, and Catherine, each piloting manned Mars Suits under the Mars Federation, and a Virgo landing force deployed by the Republic of Lanagrin. Facing the crisis threatening the Mars Federation—a state founded on absolute pacifism—Professor W and his group choose to support Naina. After successfully defeating the Virgo units, they surrender to the Mars Federation, and are reunited with Heero and the others, who had previously surrendered and were being held as honored guests. Just as the group is reunited, the Wind of Cyrene, piloting a damaged Tallgeese Heaven, arrives and collapses after warning them that the Republic of Lanagrin's mobile fortress, "Babel", is approaching Relena City.

The battle between the Mars Federation and the Preventers' forces against the approaching Babel, as well as with the Lanagrin Republic, continues to intensify. Amidst the chaos, Relena, following her own beliefs, boards Babel to initiate dialogue and surrenders to the Lanagrin Republic. In order to prevent the activation of the human extermination program PPP, Heero—who must kill Relena with his own hands while she is in a peaceful state of mind—boards Babel to rescue her. However, due to the effects of her incomplete awakening from artificial hibernation, Relena experiences cognitive dissonance and confusion, and ends up shooting Heero.

Heero is rescued by Father Maxwell and Cathy. Although his life is saved, he falls into amnesia due to the treatment administered by Doctor Hilde. In truth, information about two individuals had been removed from the memory file necessary for Heero's awakening, which caused him to experience cognitive dissonance as well, making it necessary to reset his mind. With the help of Cathy, Master Chang, and Hilde, Father Maxwell restores the incomplete memory file known as the "Zechs File" to its full state and downloads it into Heero, allowing him to make a complete recovery.

Rescued from Babel by Noin, Relena suffers injuries from Babel's bombardment of Relena City. Renewing her resolve based on her belief in total pacifism, she declares her surrender to the Southern Mars Union and resolves to offer herself up. On the way to the fortress Babel to carry out "Operation Mythos" alongside Relena, she experiences the past of warfare through a virtual visor. Taking upon herself all the guilt of the Mars Federation government, Relena accepts the death sentence handed down by the court. Heero fires a bullet that pierces Relena but it turns out to be an AI-generated hologram of her.

Meanwhile, those who remain each begin to take action to bring an end to the conflict. "The Wind of Cyrene", upon regaining consciousness, reveals his true identity as Milliardo, the first President of the Mars Government. He resumes the battle against Babel, leading Duo, Phobos, Catherine, Mille, Naina, and the Merciless Fairies. Father Maxwell, along with Alpha—a clone of Heero introduced to him by Lady Une—rallies the people to rise up. Master Chang, Doctor T, Professor W, and Catherine infiltrate the mobile doll plant "Vulcanus", hidden in Mars' satellite orbit, and successfully capture Dixneuf, the true mastermind behind everything. They obtain the deactivation code for PPP and succeed in shutting it down.

Heero, piloting the Snow White, fires the final of the Seven Dwarves—Gold—at Zechs's Epyon Unit-01, which had cornered Milliardo. The powerful EMP disables Zechs, who was an AI, bringing him to a halt. Babel and the main forces, including the Virgo IV units, also suffer system shutdowns, resulting in the Lanagrin Republic losing its military capabilities. Thus, the North-South Mars War comes to an end.

After the war, Heero appears at Mars' Winner Hospital, where Relena is spending time with her mother, carrying a letter in hand. As a vow to walk alongside Relena, who has returned to using the last name Darlian, Heero casts aside the name "Heero Yuy", the agent of the colonies, and returns to being just an ordinary boy. The letter he handed to Relena with his own hands for the first time contained a single line—a marriage proposal.

Treize File

A memory file in the virtual visor that was necessary for Heero's awakening.

It primarily depicts the process of Treize's character development, covering events from the meeting of his parents, Ain Yuy and Angelina Khushrenada, their elopement and eventual separation, the birth of Treize and his younger brother Vingt, the completion of the mobile suit and the founding of the Specials along with their first deployment, Vingt's takeover of the Romefeller Foundation, the Stormy Ocean Battle (First Lunar War), and the surprise attack by rebel forces during the Bulge Completion Ceremony that followed. It also records the tightening grip of the Romefeller Foundation on the colonies and culminates with Vingt's assassination.

Peacecraft File

A memory file created by combining the virtual visor data necessary for Heero's awakening with a file Hilde sent to Mille. It fills in the missing pieces of Relena's own awakening.

Centered on the twin princesses Sabrina and Katerina, who were born into the Peacecraft royal family, it portrays the daily struggles between the Earth Sphere Unified Alliance and the rebels, as well as the path of the young leader Heero Yuy. It records key events such as: the birth of the twin princesses in the year AC 130; the meeting between the young leader Heero Yuy and Katerina; the war between the Earth Sphere Unified Alliance and the Peacecraft Kingdom, which began in AC 145 when the rebels fled to the kingdom; the heroic actions of Katerina and the young five doctors during that conflict; Katerina's life as "Six Marquis" after ceding her name to Sabrina; her return following Sabrina's death; and Heero Yuy's appointment as deputy mayor of Emerald City.

Preventer 5

This is the CD scenario for the picture drama "New Mobile Report Gundam W: Frozen Teardrop – The Next Battle (Epyon Ares)", originally produced as a prologue to Frozen Teardrop and included as a special bonus with the Blu-ray Box 2.

In A.C. 197, the terrorist organization known as "The Next Government" seizes the Peacecraft castle in the Sanc Kingdom, which serves as Relena's residence. The group's leader, Dixneuf, aims to activate a genocide program called PPP in order to seize control of the Earth Sphere. To initiate PPP, a special computer located within the Sanc Kingdom Castle and the biometric authentication of a descendant of the Peacecraft royal family are required.

To resolve the crisis, Lady Une, head of Preventer, requests assistance from the former Gundam pilots. Thanks to their efforts, the terrorist incident is brought under control. However, the detonation of a planted nuclear bomb is linked to the activation of PPP. In order to save Heero's life—critically wounded during the operation—and to resolve the incident, Relena activates the PPP system.

To prevent the full activation of PPP, Relena chooses to enter cryogenic sleep in a stasis capsule designed by Doctor J. Heero, too, enters a separate capsule, prepared to ensure that if Relena were to awaken and unintentionally trigger the PPP, he would be able to carry out the only method of halting it: delivering Relena a peaceful death.

Zechs File

A memory file in the virtual visor that was essential for Heero's awakening. Initially incomplete due to the absence of data on Long Meilan and Sally Po from the file Hilde had created and brought by Father Maxwell.

As a continuation of the Treize File, it focuses primarily on Zechs, who went from being a rebel prisoner to a test pilot. It details the development of the Gundams, the Second Lunar War, and the evolving roles of the future Gundam pilots. Included in the records are: Zechs and Elv's redeployment after their capture, Zechs's unexpected reunion with the still-living Ain, his rejoining with Noin, the G-03554 Colony Drop Incident and the reactivation of the ZERO System during that event (which was later handed over to Treize), the training that would lead Heero to become a Gundam pilot, and the events and aftermath of the Second Lunar War.

== Characters ==
Kathy Po (キャシィ・ポォ, Kyashi Po)
Sally Po's daughter. A Preventer sent to Mars by the ESUN president Dorothy T. Catalonia to initiate Operation Mythos.
Master Chang (老師・張, Roushi Chan)
Head of the Mars Branch of Preventer. He is confirmed to be Chang Wufei, the Gundam pilot.
Father Maxwell (ファザー・マックスウェル, Fazaa Makkusuweru)
Although he is dressed in a priest's clothing, he claims to be the father of the child Duo Maxwell. He is the original Duo Maxwell, the former Gundam pilot.
Duo Maxwell II (デュオ・マックスウェル・ツー, Dyuo Makkusuweru Tsū)
Son of Father Maxwell. He is named after his father, the Gundam pilot. He appeared one day at Duo and Hilde's orphanage and while Hilde believes he is the son of Duo and some woman, Duo claims that he had to be conceived during their short marriage.

== Featured Mobile Weapons ==
None of the designs have been publicly released, and most of the units are only described through text-based information.

=== New Mobile Suits ===
As a counter-deterrent against the Mars Suits, four Mobile Suits were developed over a span of 6 Mars years (12 Earth years) by Doctor T and Professor W. Due to the peace laws rooted in total pacifism, all data related to mobile suits had been lost, making development extremely difficult. During this time, Mobile Suit made of Gundanium alloy was discovered in a hangar on an old resource satellite owned by the Winner family—where they had been dismantled and left abandoned. It was later identified as prototypes developed between the Wing Gundam Zero used in the Second Lunar War and the five Gundams deployed during Operation Meteor.

These rediscovered Mobile Suits were refined using current technology, resulting in the following MS units.

At the beginning of the story, the ones handled by Doctor T—Scheherazade and Prometheus—are at 80% completion, lagging behind Snow White and Warlock, which are under Professor W's charge.

==== Snow White ====
A Mobile Suit developed by Professor W.

While it's unclear whether it qualifies as a Gundam-type, both developers designed it with the concept of a Gundam in mind.

Its outward appearance is said to closely resemble the Wing Gundam Proto Zero, though it's unknown whether this was the original design or a deliberate choice by the developers to mimic it. It is also noted to have white wings similar to those of the Wing Gundam Zero. Whether it has transformation capabilities is unknown.

Although it is based on a Mobile Suit from before Operation Meteor, its specs rival those of the latest Mars Suits, including the heavily upgraded Virgo IV units (developed from the Virgo II and III). Its mobility in particular is outstanding—it can easily evade and outmaneuver a barrage of missiles, so numerous and fast that they defy measurement, all while leaving behind traces of blue-white particles. These missiles possess extreme speed and guidance, yet Snow White dodges them effortlessly.

Furthermore, even a direct hit from Black Wing's Buster Rifle leaves the unit unharmed, demonstrating that the Gundanium armor still offers superior protection beyond that of standard units.

Additionally, the suit remains operational during the intense magnetic storms of Mars, which would normally disable other mobile suits. It achieves this simply by donning a stealth cloak, which contains advanced stealth technology that renders it undetectable even to the Mars Federation's surveillance satellites. The cloak—and the suit itself—are white.

The suit is equipped with a ZERO System, but unlike the Wing Gundam Zero or Epyon, this one can be manually switched on or off at will.

Standard armament includes:

- A new-type cartridge-loaded Buster Rifle (3 rounds per cartridge, with 3 spare cartridges)
- A beam saber These weapons are reminiscent of those used by the Wing Gundam, once piloted by Heero Yuy.

Optional armament:

A special set of seven custom warheads called the "Seven Dwarves" (Sieben Zwerge) can be loaded into the Buster Rifle. Each one unleashes a powerful shot with a unique attribute, referred to by Professor W as "characteristics." Although described as resembling arrows in the text, the weapon is stated to be crossbow-shaped. Each warhead is associated with a color and effect:

- Red ("Rot") – Heat attribute: Emits a red glow upon firing, unleashing a "phoenix of fire" that engulfs the target. When used with the blue type, triggers a special chemical reaction.
- Blue ("Blau") – Cryogenic attribute: Emits a blue glow, unleashing a "blue bird" with icy wings. It spreads in four directions, forming a cross reminiscent of the Cygnus constellation, generating near-absolute-zero cold. When combined with Red, creates blue flames, inflicting damage through extreme temperature contrast.
- Black ("Schwarz") – Storm attribute: Briefly emits white light before launching a massive "crow-like" force that generates a tornado strong enough to sweep up enemy mobile suits in its path.
- White ("Weiß") – Lightning attribute: Emits a white glow that splits into a flock of "white doves", which, upon impact, discharge reverse lightning upward into the sky. It performs poorly against electric-field-based weapons like the Planet Defenser.
- Green ("Grün") – Plant attribute: A green flash fires upward, forming a green aurora. This is followed by hundreds of deep green beams raining down, which morph into vine-like forms that entangle the target MS and root it to the ground to immobilize it.
- Silver ("Silber") – Piercing attribute: The warhead transforms into a drill-like shape mid-flight and pierces the enemy cockpit. Made of "MG alloy", it can penetrate Gundanium-armored mobile suits with certainty.
- Gold ("Gold") – Attribute unknown: Upon impact, a golden arrow emits a radiant glow from the point of contact, unleashing a powerful EMP attack. It is a modified version of the "Nano Defenser" installed in Tallgeese Heaven, implying that all seven effects are nanomachine-based in nature.

==== Wing Gundam Snow White Prelude ====
This mobile suit is considered the prototype (Prelude) of Snow White. Detailed information was released in November 2019 by the figure brand GUNDAM FIX FIGURATION METAL COMPOSITE. The Snow White depicted on the cover of volume 12 was produced by Hajime Katoki, with supervision by Katsuyuki Sumizawa, the author and Sunrise staff.

The Prelude model is equipped with six new types of Neue Zwergs (New Zwerge), which, like the traditional Messatzwerge, can connect to the Twin Buster Rifle. Additionally, it features transformation modes called Mode Anthem and Mode Rondo.

It is unclear whether this unit is the same Snow White that appears and is active in the novel's main story, as the completed Snow White is assumed to be the one equipped with the Sieben Zwerge (Seven Dwarves).

==== Warlock ====
This is the mobile suit piloted by Duo. Its primary armament consists of two beam scythes. While specifics are unclear, the suit excels in stealth operations.

Like Snow White, it is uncertain whether Warlock is a Gundam-type, but it is depicted as a twin-eye type MS, and both units are cloaked with stealth-capable mantles. Duo is officially considered a "Gundam pilot."

Similar to the Deathscythe series, Warlock is equipped with jamming and camera hacking functions, enabling advanced tactics such as creating decoys of itself and even projecting a full moon in the sky as a distraction.

When the "Mars Limiter" system is released, Warlock transforms into a Mode: Fenrir, a quadrupedal walking form that significantly increases its movement speed. In this mode, the beam scythes morph to resemble bats' wings, emerging from the sides of the body to perform swift slashing attacks, and can also be used as beam cannons facing forward. Additionally, ten armor plates are jettisoned, which are remotely controlled to fire beams.

Though Duo can operate the remote firing alone, Catherine, who rides alongside him, helps to reduce his workload by managing the remote operations.

Despite reduced range compared to the normal mode, Warlock can still fly in this state using a flight mode.

Originally, the design was based on a quadrupedal weapon called the "Demon King", with the bipedal walking mode later added by Professor G, inspired by Wing's transformation.

==== Scheherazade ====
Scheherazade is a mobile suit under development by Doctor T. Its progress is behind that of Snow White and Warlock, but despite being incomplete, it was deployed with Trois Phobos to stop Prometheus. Later, Catherine becomes its pilot.

Doctor T describes it as a "dancing assassin"—a humanoid weapon specialized exclusively for close-quarters combat. It is equipped with a Jambiya, an Arabian-style short dagger, and is capable of flowing, dance-like movements reminiscent of belly dancing.

The Jambiya is made from a rare metal called MG Alloy, which is even harder and sharper than Gundanium alloy, enabling it to easily slice through Gundam units. In close-quarters combat, Scheherazade demonstrates top-tier fighting capabilities.

Originally, it was also supposed to be equipped with a Shamshir, a long crescent-shaped saber, but software malfunctions have prevented it from wielding this weapon.

In the Zechs File, a past version of Scheherazade is seen, showing significant changes especially around the head. Previously, like Sandrock, its main weapon was a heat shotel.

==== Prometheus ====
Prometheus was developed alongside Scheherazade but was stolen unfinished by Catherine. After being recovered, it is operated by Trowa Phobos. Like the HeavyArms Custom (EW), it wears a clown-like mask and is a heavily armed type of mobile suit with various heavy weapons built into its entire body.

Its most distinctive feature is a large cruciform weapon that exceeds the suit's own length. This weapon houses powerful firearms such as gatling guns, machine cannons, and homing missiles.

Though only 80% complete, its firepower is said to surpass that of Warlock. Prometheus is the only prototype mobile suit from the FT series with a publicly revealed visual design. It also appears in the Zechs File, where its appearance is shown to be virtually identical to its future design.

==== Epyon Bai ====
Developed independently by Master Chang after acquiring the design data of Gundam Epyon created by Treize, this unit serves as the second Epyon.

While largely similar to the original machine, it features a newly equipped Dragon Fang with beam cannons and machine cannons, as well as a Beam Trident. The heat rod and beam sword have been removed. The color scheme reflects Treize's personal colors, primarily white and blue.

Similar to the former Shenlong and Altron units, Master Chang refers to this mobile suit as "Nataku."

Like the original Epyon, it is equipped with the ZERO System and can transform into a MA (Mobile Armor) mode. In MA mode, the Dragon Fang acts as a third head, turning the unit into a three-headed wyvern.

==== Epyon Unit 01 ====
The original Gundam Epyon built by Treize during the AC era. It is one of the few Mobile Suits that have survived intact even after several decades. After the EVE Wars, it was hidden on Mars by Milliardo (currently known as the Wind of Cyrene) but was later recovered by Dixneuf. Currently, it is piloted by Senior Special Officer Zechs Marquis of the Lanagrin Republic.

The left arm, severed in a past battle with Wing Gundam Zero, has been replaced with a newly constructed silver prosthetic. Additional beam cannons have been added to the feet, which transform into a two-headed dragon in its Mobile Armor (MA) mode.

==== Tallgeese Heaven ====
A mobile suit rebuilt and upgraded with the latest technology by Wind of Cyrene using parts salvaged from the destroyed Tallgeese II (which was destroyed in A.C. 195). The Wind of Cyrene pilots the unit, and later, Mille temporarily takes over piloting duties.

Armaments include:

- Dover Gun
- Beam Saber
- Circular Shield
- Nano Defenser: A system designed to combat unmanned drones by dispersing nanomachines into the air that instantly reset the drones' stored data. If a human operator manages the drone systems, the data can be fed back to reboot them.

This technology was originally commissioned by Treize Khushrenada to eliminate Mobile Dolls, developed by researchers, and has only recently reached practical application. The dispersed nanoparticles glow with a golden light.

==== Tallgeese Shiryū ====
This mobile suit was independently developed and constructed by Master O, one of the original Tallgeese developers, after joining the resistance. It was built as a guardian for the Dragon Clan. The key difference from the Tallgeese is the absence of a face guard, giving it a design similar to the Leo.

When deployed in combat in A.C. 190, it was equipped with four additional weapons collectively called the Four Saints:

- Byakko (White Tiger): A physical sword capable of easily cutting through the armor of the Leo IV Gryph. When connected with Sōryū, it can be used as a double-edged long spear.
- Sōryū (Blue Dragon): A beam glaive that also functions as a beam cannon mounted behind Genbu.
- Genbu (Black Tortoise): A circular shield mounted on the arm, strong enough to block beam sabers.
- Suzaku (Vermilion Bird): A high-output thruster mounted on the back. Its acceleration is lethal, to the point that Go Fei (a pilot) was seen coughing up blood from the strain.

==== Black Wing ====
Black Wing is a black-colored Wing Gundam Zero piloted by Vingt Khushrenada.

Although the story does not provide detailed descriptions, the full appearance was revealed on the cover of Volume 10. The design closely resembles the Endless Waltz version of Wing Gundam Zero but features unique additions, such as bat-wing-shaped parts attached to the waist, which are not present on the original.

Its confirmed armaments include:

- Buster Rifle
- Shoulder Vulcans
- Beam Sabers

The unit is operated via the ZERO System and functions as a remotely controlled, unmanned mobile suit.

=== Mars Suits ===
A general term for bipedal machines modified for combat from the Mars Task Force machines (MTF) "Mars Terra Former" originally designed for work on Mars.

The "Mobile Suits" formerly used in the Earth Sphere—construction and industrial labor powered suits with arms—had most of their technology lost due to the actions of the Preventer, so their origins differ from Mars Suits.

Most of the mobile suits appearing in the story are called Mars Suits. However, machines who trace their origin to the Gundam lineage are called Mobile Suits out of the developers' intention.

Additionally, even mobile suits derived from the Volcanus production line are referred to as Mars Suits by the will of the Lanagrin Republic.

==== Maganac ====
When Catherine defected, she took with her a replica Mobile Doll used against her pursuer Trois. Similar to the original Maganac squad Mobile Suits, this unit consists of 40 machines, each with distinct characteristics.

Among them is the squad leader Rashid, along with specialized units such as:

- Beam cannon close-combat units
- Beam saber melee units
- Mid-range artillery support units
- High-speed assault units for advanced disruption and diversion
- Heavily armored defensive units

Unlike traditional Mobile Dolls, which had simple and repetitive behavior patterns, these replicas feature Mirror Trace Programming, allowing them to instantly invert an opponent's attack left-to-right and counterattack.

Only the leader unit, Rashid, has a cockpit capable of manned operation and can switch to manual control. When in manual mode, Rashid can project a virtual keyboard resembling piano keys inside the cockpit, using which the pilot can control the other units by "playing" them.

==== Merciless Fairies ====
A Mars Suit unit operated by the Mars Federation Army's 909th Special Independent Squadron. These are restored Leo IV Type Griph models.

- A total of 52 units exist, each given a codename based on playing cards (e.g., Heart of Queen, Spade of King).
- All units are individually customized, and their camera eyes are altered to resemble the suits they're named after.

== Novel list ==
No.	Title	Release date	ISBN
01	Rondo of Redemption (Part 1); Shokuzai no Rinbu (Rondō) (Jō) (贖罪の輪舞（ロンド）（上）)	February 26, 2011	978-4-04-715634-0
02	Rondo of Redemption (Part 2); Shokuzai no Rinbu (Rondō) (Ge) (贖罪の輪舞（ロンド）（下）)	February 26, 2011	978-4-04-715674-6
03	Requiem of Linkage (Part 1); Rensa no Chinkonkyoku (Rekuiemu) (Jō) (連鎖の鎮魂曲（レクイエム）（上）)	June 25, 2011	978-4-04-715733-0
04	Requiem of Linkage (Part 2); Rensa no Chinkonkyoku (Rekuiemu) (Ge) (連鎖の鎮魂曲（レクイエム）（下）)	October 26, 2011	978-4-04-715816-0
05	Nocturne of Sorrow (Part 1); Hitan no Yasoukyoku (Nokutān) (Jō) (悲嘆の夜想曲（ノクターン）（上）)	February 24, 2012	978-4-04-120136-7
06	Nocturne of Sorrow (Part 2); Hitan no Yasoukyoku (Nokutān) (Ge) (悲嘆の夜想曲（ノクターン）（下）)	June 23, 2012	978-4-04-120290-6
07	Rhapsody of Loneliness (Part 1); Sekiryou no Kyoushikyoku (Rapusodeī) (Jō) (寂寥の狂詩曲（ラプソディー）（上）)	January 26, 2013	978-4-04-120452-8
08	Rhapsody of Loneliness (Part 2); Sekiryou no Kyoushikyoku (Rapusodeī) (Chuu) (寂寥の狂詩曲（ラプソディー）（中）)	June 26, 2013	978-4-04-120737-6
09	Rhapsody of Loneliness (Part 3); Sekiryou no Kyoushikyoku (Rapusodeī) (Ge) (寂寥の狂詩曲（ラプソディー）（下）)	January 25, 2014	978-4-04-120983-7
10	Concerto of Encounters (Part 1); Kaikou no Kyousokyoku (Kontsuerto) (Jō) (邂逅の協奏曲（コンツェルト）（上）)	December 26, 2014	978-4-04-101908-5
11	Concerto of Encounters (Part 2); Kaikou no Kyousokyoku (Kontsuerto) (Chuu) (邂逅の協奏曲（コンツェルト）（中）)	June 26, 2015	978-4-04-103136-0
12	Concerto of Encounters (Part 3); Kaikou no Kyousokyoku (Kontsuerto) (Ge) (邂逅の協奏曲（コンツェルト）（下）)	December 26, 2015	978-4-04-103775-1
13	Silent Anthem; Mugon no Sanka (Hymnos) (無言の賛歌（さんか）)	December 26, 2015	978-4-04-103965-6
