= List of Mobile Suit Victory Gundam episodes =

Cover of the first North American Blu-ray collection by Right Stuf.

Mobile Suit Victory Gundam is a 1993 Japanese science fiction anime television series created and directed by Yoshiyuki Tomino and produced by Sunrise, with music production by Starchild Records and Apollon. Spanning 51 episodes, Mobile Suit Victory Gundam is the final television series following the Universal Century timeline in the Gundam franchise. The series premiered in Japan on TV Asahi on April 2, 1993, and concluded on March 25, 1994. In 2016, Sunrise released the series on both Blu-ray and DVD in North America via Right Stuf Inc. in two sets.

Four pieces of theme music are used over the course of the series—two opening themes and two closing themes. The opening theme for the first thirty-one episodes is "Stand Up to the Victory" by Tomohisa Kawasoe, and the opening theme for the remaining twenty episodes is "Don't Stop! Carry On!" by RD. The closing theme for the first thirty-one episodes is "Winners Forever" by INFIX, and the closing theme for the remaining twenty episodes is "Tenderness Once More" (Mouichido Tenderness) by KIX S.

== Episode list ==
No.	Title	Directed by	Written by	Original release date
1	"The White Mobile Suit"; Transliteration: "Shiroi Mobirusūtsu" (Japanese: 白いモビルスーツ)	Ikurō Satō	Akira Okeya	April 2, 1993
Uso steals the Shokew Mobile Suit from BESPA (The Ballistic Equipment and Space Patrol Armory). However it is destroyed by Lieutenant Chronicle Asher piloting a Zolo type mobile suit. Uso narrowly escapes by ejecting and is left for dead in the middle of a forest. Ms. Marbet pilots the Core Fighter of The White Gundam in search of Uso. A group transporting the rest of The White Gundam moves to the city of Uwig to meet with Boysen, who is in charge of running a factory that builds The White Gundams. The group finds Uwig destroyed and Boysen and his group killed. Uso is rescued by Ms. Marbet, piloting the Core Fighter of The White Gundam which takes the form of a jet. Thanks to a map left behind by Boysen the group is able to find the factory. Uso pilots the Core Fighter, while Ms. Marbet rides in the back due to injuries, to the factory where they are united with the group. Lieutenant Chronicle Asher takes his Zolo for an unscheduled flight test and discovers several large trucks in the vicinity of the factory the group is hiding at. Lieutenant Chronicle Asher bombards the area in an attempt to destroy the factory and its Gundams. Uso battles him in the Core Fighter, but when he runs out of ammo the factory launches the Top Fighter and Boots of The White Gundam. Uso docks his Core Fighter with the Top Fighter, but the Boots are destroyed by Lieutenant Chronicle Asher. The factory sends out another set of Boots which Uso docks to. The White Mobile Suit Quickly overwhelms Lieutenant Chronicle Asher in his Zolo. Lieutenant Chronicle Asher retreats after the sensors on his Zolo are destroyed. The White Mobile Suit is revealed to be a Victory Type Mobile Suit.
2	"The Meeting with the Machine that Day"; Transliteration: "Mashin to Atta Hi" (Japanese: マシンと会った日)	Kiyoshi Egami	Hideki Sonoda	April 9, 1993
The episode is a flash back to Kasarelia, Uso's and Shahkti's homeland, with a fight between Ms. Marbet in the Core Fighter and Lieutenant Chronicle Asher in the Shokew. During the battle Ms. Marbet is shot in the leg. Uso, who is skydiving at the time, accidentally lands on the Shokew and begins fighting with Lieutenant Chronicle Asher in the cockpit, causing the Shokew to crash into a river. Uso pilots the Shokew and after some mishaps manages to land it. Uso and Shahkti leave Ms. Marbet in the care of her League Militaire group and return home. Later that night while Uso is sending an email to Ms. Katejina Loos, who lives in Uwig, he discovers a family of illegal immigrants in his house. They then see a large group of Zolo helicopters heading towards Uwig in order to bomb it. The group discusses the actions of the Zanscare Empire and the use of its "guillotine" on earth through BESPA. Uso takes off in the Shokew and heads toward Uwig in order to protect Ms. Katejina Loos. On the way there he meets with a BESPA Zolo and a battle ensues. Uso wins and continues to head to Uwig.
3	"Uso's Fight"; Transliteration: "Usso no Tatakai" (Japanese: ウッソの戦い)	Sadao Takase	Hideki Sonoda	April 16, 1993
The episode is a continuation of the flashback. Uso arrives at the city of Uwig, which is burning. He immediately becomes under attack from the League Militaire in Uwig because they believe him to be a BESPA mobile suit. Uso is protected by the BESPA Zolos. Uso begins to engage them. Uso succeeds in destroying one Zolo before he is taken by the League Militaire. Uso and Ms. Katejina Loos manage to escape through an old subway. Lieutenant Chronicle Asher and his comrade Lieutenant Gary Tan are rescued by BESPA Zolos. A search party of two Zolos is sent to search for the Shokew. Uso engages them but is overwhelmed. He is saved by Ms. Marbet disabling one with the beam rifle of the Victory Gundam. The remaining Zolo escapes. Shahkti is then tasked with caring for a child rescued from Uwig. Shahkti, Uso, Ms. Katejina Loos, and the other immigrants join the convoy.
4	"Who We Are Fighting For"; Transliteration: "Tatakai wa Dare no Tame ni" (Japanese: 戦いは誰のために)	Akira Nishimori	Kazuhiko Gōdo	April 23, 1993
The group prepares for a possible attack as they attempt to repair the Core Fighter. Meanwhile, back at a BESPA Base, Lieutenant Chronicle Asher and Lieutenant Sabat, promoted to Captain, prepare for a mission in order to take back or destroy the Shokew. Uso shows the members of the convoy part of the area where he lives. As they search for chips to be used to help repair the Core Fighter, the group is surprised to see an entire underground room filled with computers and an early training simulator for piloting mobile suits. The BESPA Zolos arrive in the area where they last made contact with the Shokew and begin searching for it. The Zolos begin to bombard the area hoping to draw out the Shokew. Uso enters the Shokew and attempts to cover the convoy's retreat. Uso succeeds in disabling one Zolo but the odds are turning against him. He is far outnumbered and his aim is poor when using a large powerful weapon that he took from the convoy. Uso runs out of ammo, but luckily Ms. Marbet arrives in the Core Fighter to assist him. The Core Fighter docks with the Top Fighter and is able to shoot down a Zolo before taking damage and having to land. Uso springs the traps set by the group and kills Captain Sabat. Lieutenant Chronicle Asher retrieves the Shokew and the story picks up where it left off after the first episode.
5	"Godzorla's Counterattack"; Transliteration: "Gozzōra no Hangeki" (Japanese: ゴッゾーラの反撃)	Hiroshi Tamada	Hideki Sonoda	April 30, 1993
Uso disassembles the Victory Gundam into its three parts. The workers at the factory are surprised to learn that Uso, who is just a kid to them, is piloting the mobile suit. Shahkti wanders off with the child Karlmann. Lieutenant Gary Tan steals the newly completed Godzorla mobile suit in order to find Lieutenant Chronicle Asher and get revenge for Captain Sabat by destroying the Victory Gundam. The mobile armor Recarl is activated in order to monitor Lieutenant Gary in the Godzorla. Lieutenant Chronicle Asher infiltrates the factory and signals to the Godzorla its location. Uso sorties in the Core Fighter and forms the Victory Gundam with the Top Fighter and Boots. In the ensuing battle the Godzorla is disabled and Lieutenant Gary Tan is captured. However, the Victory takes considerable damage, losing an arm, a fore arm, and is shot in the ankle. Uso deals with the morality of fighting and Shahkti returns. The League Militaire plans to disassemble the factory and relocate it. Lieutenant Chronicle Asher is recognized by Shahkti even though he wore a mask the first time they met. As the first part of the convoy departs, six Zolos arrive to destroy the factory. The factory and convoy takes heavy damage as Uso sorties in the Core Fighter and begins to do battle with the six Zolos.
6	"A Fighter's Glory"; Transliteration: "Senshi no Kagayaki" (Japanese: 戦士のかがやき)	Kiyoshi Egami	Hideki Sonoda	May 7, 1993
Uso battles 3 Zolos. The convoy attempts to give him cover as they flee, but they take heavy losses. The convoy launches the Top Fighter and the Boots. Uso successfully attaches the Top Fighter but the Boots are destroyed in the process. Uso then transforms the machine into half a Gundam and disables a Zolo. As the convoy coordinates the launching of the second pair of Boots, Lieutenant Chronicle Asher arrives and shoots Hakashaku Oi Nyung, the leader of the group, in the shoulder. Stryker is killed in the ensuing fire fight. Lieutenant Chronicle Asher takes Hakashaku Oi Nyung and Ms. Katejina Loos hostage. Baker's Zolo has been disabled, and in an attempt to save himself, attaches it to another damaged Zolo. Captain Wattary Gira kills Barker to prevent the loss of the other Zolo. The convoy launches the second set of Boots and the Victory Gundam is successfully formed. After the battle, tensions in the group rise due to the kidnapping of Hakashaku and Katejina. Lieutenant Chronicle Asher meets up with the rest of the Wattary Gira Team. Captain Wattary Gira kills one of his subordinates when he attempts to rape Ms. Katejina Loos and threatens Lieutenant Chronicle Asher. Uso goes after Hakashaku and Katejina in the Victory Gundam. Along the way he discovers an abandoned Zolo which turns out to be wired with explosives. After the explosion a Zolo appears out of the ground to battles the Victory. Uso is overwhelmed at first but destroys the Zolo and takes Captain Wattary Gira hostage. Captain Wattary Gira then commits suicide after learning the humiliating truth that he and his team were defeated by a kid.
7	"The Sound of the Guillotine"; Transliteration: "Girochin no Oto" (Japanese: ギロチンの音)	Sadao Takase	Akira Okeya	May 14, 1993
The Gattarl Team is ordered to search for and destroy the League Militaire convoy. Uso leaves the convoy to return to Kasarelia in order to search for Shahkti. Odelo, Warren, and Suzy, the three immigrants that Uso found in his house, decide to follow him to Kasarelia. Lieutenant Chronicle Asher and his two hostages are recovered by the Recarl Mobile Armor. On board, Fuala Griffon, the commander of the Lagrane Base begins to interrogate the hostages. The Gattarl Team encounters both Shahkti and Uso's group in search for the convoy but lets them go thinking that they are innocent children. The Gattarl Team finds and engages the convoy. Ms. Marbet pilots the Core Fighter and quickly destroys three of the Gattarl Team's machines. Uso's group rejoins the convoy and Uso takes control of the Core Fighter after Ms. Marbet crash lands and destroys 2 more of the Gattarl Team's machines. The convoy continues to take damage as Uso docks the Core Fighter with the Boots. Shahkti returns to witness the ongoing battle as 12 mobile suits led by Lieutenant Arbeo Pippiniden, descend from space. Uso then docks with the Top Fighter and quickly overwhelms the rest of the Gattarl Team before the Kisarolia team, which just descended from space shows up. Uso fends off the Kisarolia team and they retreat. In the meantime, the torture of Hakashaku by Fuala Griffon begins. Also Lieutenant Arbeo Pippiniden visits Lieutenant Chronicle Asher and they discuss the ongoing and upcoming military situation. After the fight Uso is ridiculed for being too soft in battle, however they are interrupted by the televised execution of Hakashaku.
8	"Fierce Fight! Attacking in Waves"; Transliteration: "Gekitō! Hajōkōgeki" (Japanese: 激闘!波状攻撃)	Akira Nishimori	Sukehiro Tomita	May 21, 1993
Uso has nightmares of Hakashaku's execution. He and Shahkti decide to leave the convoy and return home to Kasarelia. Back at Largane, Lieutenant Chronicle Asher is given orders to escort Commander Fuala Griffon and all damaged mobile suits to Arti Gibraltar, where they will be launched into space and Commander Fuala Griffon will face court martial for her recent failures and quick execution of Hakashaku. He is also ordered to seize control of Gibraltar and its mass driver. Meanwhile Lieutenant Arbeo Pippiniden takes his forces to search for and destroy the Victory Gundam. Lieutenant Arbeo Pippiniden plans to lure out the Victory and have his team destroy it. Ms. Marbet launches in the Core Fighter thinking there is just one enemy. Uso sees the fight and decides to head back to the convoy. Ms. Marbet docks with the Top Fighter and continues to battle just Lieutenant Arbeo Pippiniden. Ms. Marbet forms the Victory Gundam just as the rest of Lieutenant Arbeo Pippiniden's forces join the fight. Just as Ms. Marbet is being overwhelmed, Uso parachutes out of nowhere and lands in the cockpit of the Gundam. Uso then pilots the Victory and succeeds in destroying two mobile suits before he is captured. However, another Victory Gundam arrives and saves Uso. Lieutenant Arbeo Pippiniden and his remaining forces retreat.
9	"Departure"; Transliteration: "Tabidachi" (Japanese: 旅立ち)	Ikurō Satō	Hideki Sonoda	May 28, 1993
As Uso is returning to Kasarelia in the Victory, he spots Lieutenant Chronicle Asher and a dozen Zolos escorting Commander Fuala Griffon to Arti Gibraltar. Lieutenant Chronicle Asher leaves the group to go inspect a local house; Ms. Katejina Loos is riding along in his Zolo. Lieutenant Chronicle Asher and Ms. Katejina Loos enter the house and find Shahkti inside. Uso is scouting Lieutenant Chronicle Asher's Zolo when he is discovered and attacked by two Zolos. Uso and the Victory Gundam are captured and taken before Lieutenant Chronicle Asher. Uso is surprised to see Ms. Katejina Loos and learn that she has defected to the Zanscare Empire, the enemy of the League Militaire. Lieutenant Chronicle Asher tests out the Victory. Meanwhile the other three try to free Uso. They restrain the other two Zolo pilots as Lieutenant Chronicle Asher returns in the Victory. The other Victory Gundam arrives and is attacked by Lieutenant Chronicle Asher in the Victory. Uso then pilots a Zolo and goes after Lieutenant Chronicle Asher in the Victory. The Victory loses a leg and Lieutenant Chronicle Asher attempts to enter the other Zolo. Odelo shoots at him but is stopped by Ms. Katejina Loos who informs him that she is trying to become a spy. Uso then fires the Boots of the Zolo and severely damages Lieutenant Chronicle Asher's Zolo. The Recarl mobile armor arrives and begins engaging the other Victory Gundam. Uso then pilots the Victory and attacks the Recarl, but his Boots are destroyed in the process. The other Victory gives his Boots to Uso. The Recarl and the other Zolos with all their pilots retreat.
10	"Behold! The Shrike Team"; Transliteration: "Senretsu! Shuraku Tai" (Japanese: 鮮烈!シュラク隊)	Hiroshi Tamada	Sukehiro Tomita	June 4, 1993
The convoy continues to move and Ms. Marbet and Uso are repairing the Victory. Oliver leaves in order to return to his squadron called the Shrike Team. The convoy receives order from Jinn Gehenam, the leader of the League Militaire. The League Militaire is a European resistance against the Zanscare invasion trying to get the Earth Federation to act against the Zanscare Empire. The convoy has been ordered to meet at point "DD". BESPA also learns of this rendezvous due to a leak from the League Militaire and plans to attack. Lieutenant Dupre plans to lead the attack and use Lieutenant Arbeo Pippiniden's Tomliats. Uso takes the Core Fighter and Boots with Shahkti and Karlmann to go investigate the enemy tactics at Arti Gibraltar. Uso discovers Lieutenant Dupre's forces at point "DD". Uso tries to flee and Lieutenant Dupre orders it to be captured once he see that the pilot is a boy, thinking of his own son. The Shrike Team, made up entirely of women, arrives and engages the enemy. Uso forms the Victory Gundam. BESPA is quickly overwhelmed and begin to take heavy losses. The remaining BESPA forces retreat. Commander Oliver explains that the DD plan is to attack the BESPA Largane Base. Commander Oliver punches Uso for his reckless behavior.
11	"Defense of the Shrike Team"; Transliteration: "Shuraku Tai no Bōheki" (Japanese: シュラク隊の防壁)	Kiyoshi Egami	Akira Okeya	June 11, 1993
The convey reaches point DD, a warehouse controlled by the Federation, and meet Lt. Gomez, who mentions Uso's father. Uso begins asking everyone there if they know about his father before Odelo stops him. Gomez plans on shipping the Victory Gundams to Ireland, but the warehouse is attacked by BESPA. As one of the shuttles is about to take off it is spotted by Lupe Cineau and her Tomilat. Helen, one of the Shrike Team members, sacrifices herself so the shuttle can launch.
12	"Let's Get Rid of the Guillotine"; Transliteration: "Girochin o Funsai seyo" (Japanese: ギロチンを粉砕せよ)	Sadao Takase	Akira Okeya	June 18, 1993
13	"Arti Gibraltar Airspace"; Transliteration: "Jiburarutaru Kūiki" (Japanese: ジブラルタル空域)	Akira Nishimori	Sukehiro Tomita	June 25, 1993
14	"Attack and Defense At Gilbraltar"; Transliteration: "Jiburarutaru Kōbō" (Japanese: ジブラルタル攻防)	Ikurō Satō	Akira Okeya	July 2, 1993
15	"Space Dust"; Transliteration: "Supēsudasuto" (Japanese: スペースダスト)	Sadao Takase	Kazuhiko Gōdo	July 9, 1993
16	"Reinforce Takeoff"; Transliteration: "Rīnhōsu Fujō" (Japanese: リーンホース浮上)	Kiyoshi Egami	Akira Okeya	July 16, 1993
The Reinforce takes off for space in order to destroy the Kelias Guilie, a BESPA battleship that has the ability to devastate the Earth, even from Space.
17	"The Queen of the Empire"; Transliteration: "Teikoku no Joō" (Japanese: 帝国の女王)	Mitsuko Kase	Minoru Yokitani (Composition)	July 23, 1993
Duker recaps the previous encounters between BESPA and the League Militaire to Zanscare's leaders, Queen Maria Pure Armonia and Fonse Kagatie. He tells them about the bombing of Uwig, Uso capturing Cronicle's Shokew, and the appearance of the Victory Gundam.
18	"Battle of the Space Fleets"; Transliteration: "Uchū Kantaisen" (Japanese: 宇宙艦隊戦)	Takeshi Ashizawa	Sukehiro Tomita	July 30, 1993
The League Militaire's Reinforce engages in a space battle with a Zanscare Amalthea-class battleship. The Zanscare forces are pushed back when reinforcements from the Earth Federation ship Guanland arrive. During the battle, Shatki, Suzy, Karlmann, and Flanders are ejected into space.
19	"In Search of Shahkti"; Transliteration: "Shakutī o Sagase" (Japanese: シャクティを捜せ)	Hiroshi Tamada	Kazuhiko Gōdo	August 6, 1993
Shahkti, Suzy, Karlmann, and Flanders are rescued by the Zanscare battleship Kelias Guilie. Cronicle conducts a DNA test on Shahkti and it is revealed that she is his niece and the daughter of Zanscare's leader, Queen Maria. Meanwhile, Uso, with help from Odelo, Warren, and the kids from the Hiland, sneak out of the Reinforce with a Victory Gundam and Marbet's Zoloat, piloted by Tomache, to find Shahkti and the others. The search party is intercepted by two BESPA mobile suits and a battle breaks out after Odelo fires on one of the suits. The search party is saved when the Shrike Team arrives and drives back the enemy mobile suits.
20	"The Eve Before Battle"; Transliteration: "Kessen Zen'ya" (Japanese: 決戦前夜)	Ikurō Satō	Akira Okeya	August 13, 1993
The League Militaire and Earth Federation forces prepare the Hiland's microwave system in the hope of taking down the Kelias Guilie and its fleet. With help from Junko and the Shrike Team, Uso learns how to fight on a team while defending the Hiland during its preparations. The microwave system is deployed, causing headaches and abdominal pain for BESPA's forces. The Shrike Team sorties to take down the fleet and Uso's Gundam is equipped with the Overhang Pack (the V-Dash Gundam). Due to the microwave system, BESPA is unable to efficiently fight back. During the battle, Shahkti's Newtype abilities start to manifest.
21	"The Strategic Satellite"; Transliteration: "Senryaku Eisei o Tatake" (Japanese: 戦略衛星を叩け)	Akira Nishimori	Sukehiro Tomita	August 20, 1993
Having recovered from the effects of the microwave system, BESPA starts to fight back against the League Militaire. Uso becomes distracted during the battle as his Newtype abilities start to awaken, with his Overhang Pack being destroyed. The Guanland self-destructs, taking out most of the Kelias Guilie fleet. Junko, who has started fighting more erratically, tries to take down a fleeing Cronicle, but is stopped by Marbet. The crew of the Reinforce board and overtake BESPA's remaining Squid battleship, letting the injured soldiers leave and taking over the Kelias Guilie. Haro is ejected from the Reinforce and finds the missing Shahkti, Suzy, Karlmann, and Flanders on the retreating BESPA ship. Uso learns that Shahkti is still alive.
22	"The Tiger of Space"; Transliteration: "Uchū no Tora" (Japanese: 宇宙の虎)	Kiyoshi Egami	Hideki Sonoda	August 27, 1993
The Reinforce, Squid, and the Fishbone (the ship from Hiland) dock at the La Vie En Rose 4. Uso, Marbet, Oliver, and Junko are sent out to search the debris field for any survivors. During the search, Uso finds Haro and comes across Godwald Hein, the BESPA soldier he met before. The two engage in a mobile suit battle, with Uso being saved by Junko and Oliver. The kids from the Hiland attempt to reunite with their parents on the Aineisas with Uso and his V-Dash Gundam escorting them, but are attacked by Godwald. Uso and Godwald fight inside a destroyed colony, with Uso taking out one of Godwald's subordiantes and Godwald accidentally killing the other one. After some hesistation, Uso manages to destroy Godwald's Abigor. Godwald escapes from the explosion with his suit's escape pod and attempts to steal the Victory. Uso knocks back Godwald and he is caught in an explosion, killing him. As the battle ends, the kids reunite with their parents on the Aineisas.
23	"Infiltration of Zanscare"; Transliteration: "Zansukāru Sennyū" (Japanese: ザンスカール潜入)	Takeshi Ashizawa	Akira Okeya	September 3, 1993
Martina, one of the children from the Hiland becomes ill and needs immediate medical treatment. The closest doctor is at the Side 2 colony of Amelia, the home territory of the Zanscare Empire. While infiltrating the colony, Uso spots an unknown mobile suit, the Sandhoge. He engages it in battle while the others make their way into the colony. Uso unarms the Sandhofe by cutting off all of its limbs and reunites with Odelo and the others outside of the doctor Martina has been taken to. While there, Uso, Odelo, and Warren find Suzy, Karlmann, and Flanders.
24	"Attack the Capital"; Transliteration: "Shuto Kōbō" (Japanese: 首都攻防)	Hiroshi Tamada	Akira Okeya	September 10, 1993
Suzy tells Uso, Odelo, and Warren that Shahkti is the biological daughter of Queen Maria. Across the street from the doctor, Shahkti is meeting with her mother. She attempts to escape but is stopped when Cronicle asks her if she really wants to return to the battlefield. A Zanscare patrol approaches the house and Uso, Odelo, and Warren try to lead them away. The distraction works, with Haro using images of the Victory to fool the patrolmen. Uso escapes with Haro to his Victory Gundam and exits into space, but is confronted by the repaired Sandhoge. The Sandhoge overloads the Victory's electrical system and Haro is severely damaged trying to protect Uso from the current. The Victory is captured, but Uso manages to get the Core Fighter and Boots operational. The newly modified Reinforce, now dubbed the Reinforce Junior, launches a surprise attack on Amelia to help Federation prisoners escape. The Shrike Team infiltrates the colony and Junto destroys Zanscare's nuclear weapon cache. During the battle, Uso briefly reunites with Shahkti at the royal palace but must leave her behind. Uso engages in a battle with Cronicle, who manages to destroy the Victory's Boots. Uso is saved by Marbet and Oliver, who give him part of their Gundams so he can help escort the Fishbone and Aineisas back to the Reinforce Junior. Uso engages in battle with Cronicle once again, but manages to escape by un-docking the Victory's Top Fighter and distracting Cronicle.
25	"Infiltrate the Enemy's Fleet and Land"; Transliteration: "Tekikan to Tekichi e" (Japanese: 敵艦と敵地へ)	Akira Nishimori	Akira Okeya	September 17, 1993
BESPA's forces pursue the Reinforce Junior as it tries to escape from Side 2. The enemy fleet is pushed back with the use of unorthodox tactics, such as Oliver un-docking segments of his Victory Gundam and launching them into enemy ships and due to the inexperience of the Zanscare pilots. Uso attempts to follow the retreating BESPA forces, but is stopped by the Fishbone. Peggy is injured during the battle after her Gun-EZ is damaged and is taken back to the Fishbone by Marbet and Uso. Intending to get Peggy medical treatment, Odelo and the others on the Fishbone devise a plan to sneak back into Amelia, but Peggy leaves the ship and takes her damaged Gun-EZ to Uso's Victory Gundam. The Fishbone, disguised as a BESPA ship, manages to enter the colony's harbor, while Marbet's disguised Zoloat is taken in with damaged mobile suits. Uso and Peggy hide in a damaged battleship, with Uso being spotted by a group of Zanscare soldiers. He pretends to be a child who has been separated from his parents and is taken in by the soldiers. As the soldiers enter the harbor, they are greeted by Queen Maria and Cronicle, with the latter spotting Uso in the crowd. Peggy uses the Vulcan guns on her Gun-EZ to create a distraction while Uso attempts to capture Maria.
26	"Maria and Uso"; Transliteration: "Maria to Usso" (Japanese: マリアとウッソ)	Osamu Sekita	Hideki Sonoda	September 24, 1993
Uso captures Queen Maria to use her as a human shield to infiltrate the colony. Uso, Marbet, and Peggy and corned by Cronicle in his Contio. Peggy sacrifices herself so that Uso and Marbet can escape, but the two are captured by Cronicle. The crew of the Fishbone manage to sneak back into Amelia and are taken to a factory by a man who is a friend of Tomache's father. Fonse Kagatie, Zanscare's military leader, plans on executing Uso and Marbet for being Federation soldiers and the Zanscare fleet commander Tassilo Vago for allowing the Kelias Guilie fleet to be nearly destroyed. Uso's Victory Gundam and Peggy's Gun-EZ are taken to the same factory that the Fishbone crew are hiding at for repairs. Uso is taken to the factory to help with the repairs and Queen Maria leaves him a bag of candy, with a map showing the locations of Zanscare's defenses at the square for tomorrow's ceremony. The Victory and Gun-EZ are put on display for the ceremony and Queen Maria uses her power to heal those in the crowd. After Maria leaves, Fonse starts the execution but Odeloa and Tomache take control of the mobile suits, causing chaos and panic with Odelo using the Victory to destroy the guillotine. Uso takes control of the Victory but he is caught in a battle with the mobile suit Rig Shokew, which is being piloted by Katejina.
27	"The Light of Outer Space"; Transliteration: "Uchū o Hashiru Senkō" (Japanese: 宇宙を走る閃光)	Takeshi Ashizawa	Hideki Sonoda	October 1, 1993
Katejina, who has now fully turned to the ideals of Zanscare, engages in a battle with Uso and Marbet. The League Militaire launches another surprise attack on the colony, with the Shrike Team blowing a hole in the side of the colony. Uso protects the Fishbone from a Zoloat, but is pursued once again by Katejina. Katejina damages Uso's Victory Gundam, leaving only the Core Fighter left. Katejina is about to finish off Uso, but he is saved by Junto's Gunblaster and Katejina is forced to retreat. The Federation plans on using the Kelias Guilie's Big Cannon to wipe out Zanscare's space fleet and destroy Amelia's harbor, but Cronicle plants a bomb to try and stop it from being used. Junko attempts to disable the bomb, but she is killed once it goes off and the wireless control for the Big Cannon is damaged in the process. Uso controls the Big Cannon remotely, but Cronicle interferes once again and the Big Cannon's beam is redirected. Most of Zanscare's space fleet is wiped out, but the colony only receives minor damage.
28	"The Great Escapade"; Transliteration: "Daidassō" (Japanese: 大脱走)	Yūsuke Yamamoto	Akira Okeya	October 8, 1993
With most of its resources having been depleted in the previous battle, the Reinforce Junior is forced to retreat to the nearby colony of Macedonia, which is under the influence of the Zanscare Empire. The ship's crew are sent to a prison camp and Marbet and Oliver marry to lower the guards' defenses. Cronicle's mobile suit force, led by Lt. Lupe, enters the colony in an attempt to take Shahkti back to Amelia. In the confusion, the ship's crew makes it back to the Reinforce Junior while Uso, Oliver, Marbet, Juca, and Connie take back the stolen Victory Gundams. Uso separates from the group to act as bait and he is captured by Katejina after his Gundam is severely damaged.
29	"The New Mobile Suit: V2"; Transliteration: "Atarashii Sūtsu V2" (Japanese: 新しいスーツV2)	Ikurō Satō	Akira Okeya	October 15, 1993
The Reinforce Junior manages to escape from Macedonia while Uso escapes from the BESPA forces with help from Haro and Flanders. Once in space, Uso realizes that the core fighter is leaking air and sends out an S.O.S. to the Reinforce Junior. Lupe's team catches up to Uso, but he is saved by the Shrike Team and the White Ark, which is carrying the new Victory 2 "V2" Gundam. Uso pilots the V2 and pushes back Lupe's team after killing one of the pilots. Following the Battle, Uso learns that the V2 was developed by Myra Miggelle, his mother.
30	"Mother's Gundam"; Transliteration: "Haha no Gandamu" (Japanese: 母のガンダム)	Hiroshi Tamada	Akira Okeya	October 22, 1993
The crew of the White Ark travel to the lunar city of Saint Josef to help repair the Reinforce Junior. While in the city, the kids rescue a woman who is being pursued by Zanscare's secret police. The woman the children save is Myra Miggelle and Uso is finally able to reunite with his mother.
31	"Motorad Takeoff"; Transliteration: "Motoraddo Hasshin" (Japanese: モトラッド発進)	Yoshitaka Fujimoto	Akira Okeya	October 29, 1993
Marbet and Oliver help train Odelo and Tomache to become mobile suit pilots, while the League Militaire finds out that BESPA forces are hiding on the moon near Saint Josef. To prevent a battle from breaking out, Shahkti goes out on her own to find the Motorad fleet and try to persuade Cronicle to not attack the Earth. Uso and Myra rescue Shahkti, but Myra is captured by Katejina. As the Motorad fleet starts to takeoff, Oliver rams his V2's core fighter into the wheels of the flagship, Adrestia, in a suicide attack.
32	"Pressing Doggorla"; Transliteration: "Doggōra Gekishin" (Japanese: ドッゴーラ激進)	Takeshi Ashizawa	Kazuhiko Gōdo	November 5, 1993
The Motorad fleet stops at the Marilyn so the Adrestia can be repaired. Hoping to attack BESPA while they are vulnerable, the League Militaire launches an attack against the enemy fleet, but BESPA manages a stout defense with the mobile armor Doggorla. Despite their inexperience as mobile suit pilots, Odelo and Tomache are sent out to fight. The Adrestia escapes during the battle and Uso's V2 manages to destroy the Doggorla. Following the battle, Marbet and the crews of the Reinforce Junior and White Ark hold a funeral for Oliver.
33	"People Who Dwell in the Sea"; Transliteration: "Umi ni Sumu Hitobito" (Japanese: 海に住む人々)	Yoshiyuki Takei	Hideki Sonoda	November 12, 1993
The Motorad fleet attempts to enter the Earth's atmosphere, but engage in a battle with the Shrike Team. The Adrestia is damaged during the battle while Uso's V2 Gundam and Katejina's Gedlav are sucked in by the Earth's gravity well. The V2 survives the atmospheric entry by hiding behind the Reinforce Junior's beam barrier. Despite having no protection, Katejina's Gedlav survives the re-entry, crash lands into the sea and is rescued by a cult who idolizes the beliefs of Queen Maria and the Zanscare Empire. The League Militaire fleet land and head to the underwater city of Underhook. While there, Uso and Shahkti see Katejina and the two stumble upon the cult and Shahkti is captured. Lupe attacks the Reinforce Junior and White Ark while the Motorad fleet damages Underhook. Shahkti is taken aboard the Adrestia and tries to plead with Cronicle to stop the attack.
34	"Operation Giant Roller"; Transliteration: "Kyodai Rōrā Sakusen" (Japanese: 巨大ローラー作戦)	Yūsuke Yamamoto	Akira Okeya	November 19, 1993
BESPA launches Operation: Earth Cleansing in preparation of Queen Maria's arrival to Earth. Cronicle's fleet destroys a Federation-controlled city on the coast and the Shrike Team tries to stop the advancing forces. Uso tries to stop the fleet by destroying an abandoned Javelin and causing its reactor to go off, but this proves to be futile as the fleet flies away. During the battle, Odelo and Tomache capture the BESPA pilot Goze Barl.
35	"Mother or Shahkti?"; Transliteration: "Haha ka Shakutī ka" (Japanese: 母かシャクティか)	Ikurō Satō	Akira Okeya	November 26, 1993
Goze escapes from the Reinforce Junior with the crew intentionally letting him go. Goze heads back to the Adrestria with his Zollidia and the V2, with Odelo hiding in the Zollida and Uso in the Gundam. The two sneak on board the Adrestia and plant explosives throughout the ship and help Myra and Shahkti escape. As the group try to leave the ship Myra is captured by Cronicle while the others get away.
36	"Mother Returns to the Earth"; Transliteration: "Haha yo Daichi ni Kaere" (Japanese: 母よ大地にかえれ)	Osamu Sekita	Kazuhiko Gōdo	December 3, 1993
The League Militaire fleet continues its pursuit of the Adrestria fleet. Goze's Zollida engages in a battle with Uso's V2 using Myra as a human shield. The Shrike Team disables the Zollida with the damaged mobile suit falling onto the Adrestia. Another Motorad ship, the Lysithea, is knocked back into the Adrestia, killing Goze and decapitating Myra. Uso retrieves the helmet containing his mother's severed head. Just moments after Myra's death the Zanscare Empire and Earth Federation announce a cease-fire.
37	"Counterattack of the Twinrad"; Transliteration: "Gyakushū Tsuinraddo" (Japanese: 逆襲ツインラッド)	Takeshi Ashizawa	Akira Okeya	December 10, 1993
With the cease-fire treaty having been signed, Captain Gomez allows the crews of the White Ark and Reinforce Junior to go on vacation. Uso plans on returning to Kasarelia to spread his mother's ashes with Marbet and the others going with him. On the way there the White Ark is attacked from the sea by Duker's Lysithea. Duker's forces retreat when the White Ark receives reinforcements from the Federation's Londenderry Team arrive.
38	"The North Sea Begins Burning"; Transliteration: "Hokkai o Honō ni Somete" (Japanese: 北海を炎にそめて)	Hiroshi Tamada	Hideki Sonoda	December 17, 1993
The White Ark is once again attacked by Duker's fleet. Odelo destroy's the Lysithea's bridge, killing Duker and Renda and bringing the battle to an end.
39	"The Song of the Wings of Light"; Transliteration: "Hikari no Tsubasa no Uta" (Japanese: 光の翼の歌)	Tetsuya Watanabe	Akira Okeya	December 24, 1993
The White Ark reaches Kasarelia, but it is quickly caught in a battle with BESPA forces. The mobile suit squad launches an all out attack on the White Ark, but are stopped when Uso enlarges the V2's Wings of Light to disable most of the suits. The remaining suit, piloted by Machis Walker, engages in a one-on-one fight with the V2, but dies after his suit sustains heavy damage. Following the battle, the remains of Myra, Oliver, Walker, and the dead Shrike Team pilots are laid to rest in Kasarelia.
40	"Under the Super Aerial Attack"; Transliteration: "Chōkōkū Kōgeki no Shita" (Japanese: 超高空攻撃の下)	Ikurō Satō	Akira Okeya	January 7, 1994
The Reinforce Junior and White Ark head to the former BESPA base at Largane to prepare to launch into space. While working on the preparations Uso meets Walker's wife and daughters. At night the base is suddenly attacked from a high altitude by an unknown attacker and Uso saves Walker's family. With the attacks seemingly targeting the Reinforce Junior, the White Ark ascends into the atmosphere and learn that the attacker is a large, unknown mobile suit, the Zanneck. The Shrike Team causes the mobile suit to retreat and the League Militaire fleet heads back into space.
41	"The Battlefield Created by Father"; Transliteration: "Chichi no Tsukutta Senjō" (Japanese: 父のつくった戦場)	Yūsuke Yamamoto	Hideki Sonoda	January 14, 1994
The League Militaire fleet returns to space and meets the Federation's fleet at the Hiland, where Uso is reunited with his father, Hangelg. Hangelg is revealed to be the real Jinn Gehenam and the leader of the League Militaire. Uso, Odelo, and Tomache are officially recruited as Federation pilots. The joint League Militaire-Earth Federation fleet learn of the Zanscare's Angel Halo, a large psycommu device that can control thoughts and brain activity.
42	"Fresh Blood Swirls in the Light"; Transliteration: "Senketsu wa Hikari no Uzu ni" (Japanese: 鮮血は光の渦に)	Takeshi Ashizawa	Akira Okeya	January 21, 1994
The Federation fleet breaks through BESPA's first line of defense. Uso and Lupe engage in a battle and Uso damages Lupe's Bruckeng. Lupe makes it back to Pippiniden's Adrastea and plows her suit into his mobile armor Birknau as it prepares to take off. The resulting explosion kills them both and destroys the ship.
43	"The Battlefield Comet Fuala"; Transliteration: "Senjō no Suisei Fara" (Japanese: 戦場の彗星ファラ)	Osamu Sekita	Akira Okeya	January 28, 1994
The Federation fleet continues to push forward to Angel Halo. The V2 engages in a battle with the Zanneck and Uso learns that it is being piloted by Fuala. Fuala explains how she was rescued by Tassilo two days into her space exile and that the two plan to overthrow Kagatie. The Zanneck is destroyed and Fuala escapes. The White Ark heads to Angel Halo on its own.
44	"Love is at the End of the Light"; Transliteration: "Ai wa Hikari no Hate ni" (Japanese: 愛は光の果てに)	Yoshiyuki Takei	Hideki Sonoda	February 4, 1994
Disguising itself as a salvage ship the White Ark reaches Angel Halo. Queen Maria, who is nearby, senses Shahkti's presence on the station. Shahkti is captured by Fuala and taken to Tassilo's ship.
45	"Uso Dances with Illusions"; Transliteration: "Genkaku ni Odoru Usso" (Japanese: 幻覚に踊るウッソ)	Hiroshi Tamada	Minoru Yokitani (Composition)	February 11, 1994
Queen Maria and Kagatie reach Angel Halo. Angelo Halo is activated and Uso begins to hallucinate that he is still in Kasarelia and back on the Hiland. A team of Zoloats are sent out to see the effects of Angel Halo and Uso's visions become stronger during the battle, thinking he is fighting Cronicle then Katejina. With help from Odelo, Uso manages to destroy the Zoloats and the Angel Halo deactivates after Queen Maria senses the pilots' deaths.
46	"Tassilo's Revolt"; Transliteration: "Tashiro Hanran" (Japanese: タシロ反乱)	Ikurō Satō	Kazuhiko Gōdo	February 18, 1994
The V2 is upgraded to the V2 Buster Gundam. Fuala takes Shahkti to Cronicle's ship. Opposing the use of Angel Halo and feeling that Kagatie is using the queen as a puppet, Tassilo captures Maria.
47	"Women's Battlefield"; Transliteration: "Onna Tachi no Senjō" (Japanese: 女たちの戦場)	Tetsuya Watanabe	Akira Okeya	February 25, 1994
With Queen Maria having been captured, Kagatie plans on using Shahkti to activate Angel Halo. Uso and Fuala fight and Marbet helps Uso. Fuala is about to kill Marbet, but senses that she is pregnant. Using the separated segments of Marbet's Victory Gundam, Uso manages to defeat Fuala. Queen Maria tries to reach out to Uso using her Newtype abilities but Tassilo finds out about this. Angel Halo activates with Shahkti controlling it, but the waves are directed towards Earth.
48	"Vanquished Life, Blooming Life"; Transliteration: "Kieru Inochi Saku Inochi" (Japanese: 消える命咲く命)	Takeshi Ashizawa	Akira Okeya	March 4, 1994
Tassilo kills Queen Maria in front of Uso. With the only thing stopping Uso now gone, he destroys the ship and kills Tassilo. The Federation and League Militaire plan for their final assault on Angel Halo.
49	"Above the Angel's Ring"; Transliteration: "Tenshi no Wa no Ue de" (Japanese: 天使の輪の上で)	Osamu Sekita	Akira Okeya	March 11, 1994
The V2 makes its way to Angel Halo, but is intercepted by Katejina and a mobile suit squad. Juca sacrifices herself so Uso can enter Angel Halo. As the V2 makes its way through Angel Halo Katejina sends out a platoon of women dressed in bikinis to distract Uso and destroy the Gundam. Uso takes out the squad and fights with a Gun-EZ being piloted by Katejina. Katejina escapes as the Gun-EZ is destroyed, now realizing that Uso will not hesistate to kill her. Uso, Odelo, and Tomache make it to the control room and rescue Shahkti. As they leave Angel Halo it starts to descend to Earth. Despite Shahkti being removed from it, Angel Halo is still active as Shahkti is still connected to the thousands of psychickers on board the station.
50	"The Battle Called Upon by Hate"; Transliteration: "Nikushimi ga Yobu Taiketsu" (Japanese: 憎しみが呼ぶ対決)	Yūsuke Yamamoto	Akira Okeya	March 18, 1994
Angel Halo and the Federation fleet enter the Earth's atmosphere. An all-out assault breaks out as the Federation tries to stop Angel Halo with both sides taking heavy casualties. The Federation flagship, the Jeanne D'Arc, is heavily damaged by Cronicle as Uso and Shahkti make it back to Angel Halo. As Shahkti beings to pray, Katejina becomes hysterical and kills Franny and Miliera. Cronicle damages the Reinforce Junior, but retreats before he can destroy it when Katejina calls out to him. Most of the Reinforce Junior's crew evacuates the ship, with only Captain Gomez, Jinn, and the old men remaining. The Reinforce Junior rams into a BESPA ship, destroying the entire Motorad fleet. As Shahkti continues her prayer, sections of Angel Halo begin to break away. Uso and Cronicle begin their final battle with one another. Connie attempts to help Uso, but is killed by Katejina, who refuses for anyone to interfere in the fight.
51	"The Ascension of the Angels"; Transliteration: "Tenshi Tachi no Shōten" (Japanese: 天使たちの昇天)	Akira Nishimori	Hideki Sonoda	March 25, 1994
The fight between Uso and Cronicle continues with Odelo and Tomache joining in. The damaged Jeanne D'Arc rams into Kabatie's Shugan, destroying both ships as he flees to Angel Halo. As the ships are destroyed, a light starts to emmit from Angel Halo that engulfs the battlefield. The light causes Katejina to become hysterical again and she kills Odelo. The fight between Uso and Cronicle ends as the V2 destroys the Rig Contio; Cronicle is thrown from his cockpit and lands on one of the Angel Halo segments, with the impact killing him. Katejina fights Uso, telling him that she loved Cronicle. The separated segments of Angel Halo start to reform and ascend to space. Uso defeats Katejina, using the V2's Wings of Light as a shield that destroys her mobile suit. As the last section of Angel Halo ascends, Shahkti is recovered by Uso. With the war now over, the surviving League Militaire members return to Kasarelia. Shahkti comes across a blind woman with no memories who is looking for Uwig. After the woman leaves Shahkti realizes it was Katejina and weeps for her.
