= Mobile Suit Victory Gundam =

Japanese anime television series and its franchise

- 機動戦士V(ヴィクトリー)ガンダム
- Genre: Military science fiction, Mecha, Drama
- Created by: Hajime Yatate; Yoshiyuki Tomino
- Directed by: Yoshiyuki Tomino (chief)
- Music by: Akira Senju
- Country of origin: Japan
- Original language: Japanese
- No. of episodes: 51 (list of episodes)

Production
- Producers: Yoshiaki Koizumi (TV Asahi); Masuo Ueda (Sunrise)
- Production companies: TV Asahi; Sunrise

Original release
- Network: ANN (TV Asahi)
- Release: April 2, 1993 – March 25, 1994

Related
- Novel series
- Written by: Yoshiyuki Tomino
- Illustrated by: Haruhiko Mikimoto
- Published by: Kadokawa Shoten
- Imprint: Kadokawa Sneaker Bunko
- Original run: January 25, 1993 – June 28, 1994
- Volumes: 5
- Manga

Go! Go! Our Victory Gundam!!
- Written by: Tsukasa Kotobuki
- Published by: Kadokawa Shoten; MediaWorks
- Magazine: Media Comix Dyne; MS Saga
- Original run: August 10, 1993 – June 5, 1994
- Volumes: 1
- Manga
- Written by: Toshiya Iwamura
- Published by: Kodansha
- Magazine: Comic BomBom
- Original run: 1993 – 1994
- Volumes: 2
- Manga

Mobile Suit Victory Gundam Outside Story
- Written by: Yuichi Hasegawa
- Published by: Kadokawa Shoten
- Magazine: MS Saga
- Published: 1994
- Volumes: 1

Mobile Suit Victory Gundam (機動戦士V(ヴィクトリー)ガンダム, Kidō Senshi Vikutorī Gandamu; Mobile Suit V Gundam), is a 1993 Japanese science fiction anime television series. It consists of 51 episodes, and was directed by Gundam creator Yoshiyuki Tomino. The series was first broadcast on TV Asahi (and its ANN stations). It is the fourth TV anime installment in the Gundam franchise, first series in the franchise released in Japan's Heisei period, and the final full series to be set in the Universal Century calendar.

== Plot ==
Victory Gundam is set in UC 0153, and succeeds the Federation Force and Crossbone Vanguard conflict of Mobile Suit Gundam F91. The Earth, still loosely controlled by the greatly weakened Earth Federation, comes under attack by BESPA, the armed forces of the space colony–based Zanscare Empire. Only a ragtag resistance movement, the League Militaire, stands in BESPA's way as they swiftly conquer much of space and start their invasion of Earth, with the advanced mass-produced mobile suit, the Victory Gundam, as the League Militaire's secret weapon. However, BESPA's power continues to grow, using violent means, including public executions with guillotines, to strike fear into those living on Earth.

Living peacefully on Earth in the remote Eastern European town of Kasarelia, 13-year-old Üso Ewin and his childhood friend Shahkti Kareen are soon thrown into the conflict when they encounter ace BESPA pilot Chronicle Asher. Soon, Üso finds himself joining forces with Marbet Fingerhut and the rest of the League Militaire, piloting the Victory Gundam against BESPA, and soon discovering the horrors of war.

== Production ==
=== Development ===
Victory Gundam is the fourth Gundam television series and the first of four Gundam television series that aired on TV Asahi and its sister ANN stations in Japan sequentially from 1993 through 1996. In order to attract the younger elementary school age demographic that SD Gundam was popular with at the time, the show featured the youngest protagonist in the Gundam franchise, the thirteen-year-old Uso Ewin, and established a setting within Universal Century that was largely independent of previous Gundam works. Unlike previous Gundam series that started off in space colonies, the show starts off in Eastern Europe before moving to space 15 episodes later. The intent of this was for Tomino to dispel the association between Gundam and space. Nonetheless, the mature themes of the show, as well as the high casualty rate of the main cast, meant that the show would instead attract an older crowd, the young adults who had seen Mobile Suit Zeta Gundam and Mobile Suit Gundam ZZ a decade earlier.

The show was nonetheless able to more than double the sales of "real" Gundam models, which had been greatly lagging behind SD Gundam model sales. As SD Gundam model sales had been in a decline, Bandai's Gundam toy sales ultimately increased as a result of the show, but still missed its targets of 10 million units sold. This compounded with the fact that the show had failed to attract its target audience led to a cancellation of Sunrise's next Gundam series, which was under production at the time and was to be a war story featuring a conflict between Earth and Mars colonists, with a working title of Polca Gundam (ポルカガンダム). Instead, Sunrise would go on to create Mobile Fighter G Gundam.

The Bandai acquisition of Sunrise was also in the planning stages during Victory Gundam's development, with the former looking to address the declining popularity of the Gundam franchise, which was a main source of revenue for them. Years later, Tomino would lament the fact that he had started production of this series not aware of that situation, which caused a rift between the director and Sunrise for many years.

=== Release ===
The entire series was released on DVD by Bandai Visual in Japan on January 23, 2004. The limited-edition DVD box release was notable for containing an interview of Tomino titled, "This DVD should not be bought as it is not intended to be seen!!" (「このDVDは、見られたものではないので買ってはいけません!!」). Tomino has also made a similar comment on a Mobile Suit Zeta Gundam DVD interview.

Years after the show was first broadcast in Japan, the show aired on the anime satellite television network, Animax, in Japan and later its respective networks worldwide, including Hong Kong, Southeast Asia, East Asia, and other regions.

In 2015, Bandai Visual released Victory Gundam on Blu-Ray in two box sets using a new HD master and telecine. The sets also included audio commentary, exclusive booklets, and cover art by mechanical designer Hajime Katoki. As with the DVDs, Tomino reiterated his disdain for the series in promotional materials, claiming that he wished to "deny [the show] completely" and asked that viewers of the set "find what went wrong with 'Mobile Suit V Gundam'."

In 2016, Sunrise released the series on both Blu-ray and DVD in North America via Right Stuf Inc. in two sets.

== Other media ==
=== Novelizations ===
A series of five novels were written by director Yoshiyuki Tomino and initially published under the Kadokawa Sneaker Bunko label. This adaptation generally follows the plot of the anime but is notable for additional scenes and dialogue that contain graphic sexual references. In addition, the Victory 2 Gundam does not appear in the novel. Instead it is replaced by a Victory-type with a mounted Minovsky Drive. The "Bugs", which were the automatic manslaughtering weapons of Gundam F91, also make an appearance.

No.	Title	Author	Publisher	Date	ISBN
1	Üso Ewin Mobile Suit V Gundam Vol. 1 (ウッソ・エヴィン 機動戦士Vガンダム（1）)	Yoshiyuki Tomino	Kadokawa Shoten	25 March 1993	978-4-04-410147-3
2	Multiple Mobile Suit Mobile Suit V Gundam Vol. 2 (マルチプル・モビルスーツ 機動戦士Vガンダム（2）)	Yoshiyuki Tomino	Kadokawa Shoten	27 August 1993	978-4-04-410148-0
3	Maria leading Mobile Suit V Gundam Vol. 3 (マリア・リーディング 機動戦士Vガンダム（3）)	Yoshiyuki Tomino	Kadokawa Shoten	24 December 1993	978-4-04-410149-7
4	Combination Mobile Suit V Gundam Vol. 4 (コンビネーション 機動戦士Vガンダム（4）)	Yoshiyuki Tomino	Kadokawa Shoten	31 March 1994	978-4-04-410150-3
5	Angel Halo Mobile Suit V Gundam Vol. 5 (エンジェル・ハィロゥ 機動戦士Vガンダム（5）)	Yoshiyuki Tomino	Kadokawa Shoten	28 June 1994	978-4-04-410151-0

=== Manga adaptations ===
A more lighthearted manga adaptation of the anime by Toshiya Iwamura was published on the Comic BomBom manga magazine. The serious atmosphere from the show was absent from the manga, replaced by gags, less serious personalities, and more super robot-style action scenes.

A gag parody manga by Tsukasa Kotobuki entitled Go! Go! Our Victory Gundam (いけ!いけ!ぼくらのVガンダム!!, Ike! Ike! Bokura no V Gandamu!!) was published throughout 1993 to 1994 in the Media Comic Dyne and MS Saga magazines, and was later republished in 2012 by Kadokawa Shoten, which included two side-stories from Gundam Ace involving Kai Shiden, and a parody story of Gundam Wing.

=== Spin-off manga ===
A spin-off to the series by Yuichi Hasegawa, Mobile Suit Victory Gundam Outside Story (機動戦士Vガンダム外伝, Kidō Senshi Vikutorī Gandamu Gaiden), titled Mobile Suit Victory Gundam Outside Story: Escape Plan Edition (機動戦士Vガンダム外伝 脱出計画編, Kidō Senshi Vikutorī Gandamu Gaiden Dasshutsu Keikaku-hen) during serialization and republished in 2012 as Mobile Suit Victory Gundam Project Exodus (機動戦士Vガンダム プロジェクト・エクソダス), was published in 1994 in the Shōnen Kids magazine and compiled into a tankobon in 1995. The manga occurs during the events of the anime, when Uso travels to Jupiter and encounters an old man by the name of Grey Stoke.

=== Video games ===
A side-scrolling action game based on the show was released in Japan for the Super Famicom on March 11, 1994.

== See also ==
Preceded by Mobile Suit Gundam 0083: Stardust Memory	Gundam metaseries (production order); 1993–1994	Succeeded by Mobile Fighter G Gundam
Preceded by Mobile Suit Gundam F91, Mobile Suit Crossbone Gundam (manga)	Gundam Universal Century timeline U.C. 0153	Succeeded by G-Saviour, Mobile Suit Crossbone Gundam: Dust (manga)
