= Mobile Suit Gundam École du Ciel =

Japanese manga series

- First tankōbon volume cover

機動戦士ガンダム エコール·デュ·シエル (Kidō Senshi Gandamu Ekōru dyu Shieru)
- Genre: Mecha, Military science fiction
- Created by: Hajime Yatate; Yoshiyuki Tomino
- Manga
- Written by: Haruhiko Mikimoto
- Published by: Kadokawa Shoten
- English publisher: NA: Tokyopop
- Magazine: Gundam Ace
- Original run: December 18, 2001 – February 26, 2011
- Volumes: 12

Mobile Suit Gundam École du Ciel (機動戦士ガンダム エコール·デュ·シエル, Kidō Senshi Gandamu Ekōru dyu Shieru; "Sky School") is a Japanese manga series written and illustrated by Haruhiko Mikimoto. Officially part of Sunrise's long running Gundam franchise, the manga was serialized in Kadokawa Shoten's Gundam Ace from 2001 to 2011 and was compiled into twelve tankōbon volumes. It was licensed in North America by Tokyopop, who released nine volumes, and in France the manga is licensed and published by Pika Édition.

== Plot summary ==
Beginning in Universal Century 0085, Asuna Elmarit is a student from École du Ciel, a military school for training future MS pilots. Unexpected events occur, exposing Asuna and her classmates to the reality that is war. Along the way, the school council's real intentions are revealed.

== Manga ==
Kadokawa Shoten published the first tankōbon volume of the manga on November 22, 2002. Tokyopop published the first tankōbon volume of the manga on September 13, 2005, they released nine in total. Pika Édition released the first tankōbon volume of the manga in France on March 15, 2005.

No.	Original release date	Original ISBN	English release date	English ISBN
1	November 22, 2002	978-4-04-713520-8	September 13, 2005	978-1-59532-851-9
2	July 29, 2003	978-4-04-713564-2	January 10, 2006	978-1-59532-852-6
3	March 24, 2004	978-4-04-713612-0	May 9, 2006	978-1-59532-853-3
4	July 23, 2004	978-4-04-713641-0	September 12, 2006	978-1-59532-854-0
5	December 13, 2004 (limited edition); December 21, 2004 (regular edition)	978-4-04-713687-8	March 13, 2007	978-1-59816-209-7
6	May 24, 2005	978-4-04-713723-3	July 3, 2007	978-1-59816-858-7
7	October 21, 2005	978-4-04-713752-3	December 4, 2007	978-1-42780-154-8
8	March 23, 2006	978-4-04-713802-5	April 1, 2008	978-1-42780-155-5
9	October 24, 2006	978-4-04-713854-4	March 30, 2010	978-1-42780-918-6
10	August 23, 2007	978-4-04-713936-7	—	—
11	June 24, 2008	978-4-04-715076-8	—	—
12	March 24, 2011	978-4-04-715666-1	—	—

== See also ==
Mobile Suit Gundam GQuuuuuuX - set Alternate Universal Century in U.C. 0085 timeline, where Zeon finally won the war and also the female main protagonist appeared.
