= Gundam Ace =

Japanese manga magazine

- Chief Editor: Hideaki Kobayashi
- Categories: Shōnen manga
- Frequency: Quarterly (2001–2002); Bimonthly (2003); Monthly (2004–present)
- Circulation: 120,000 (2017)
- First issue: June 25, 2001 (August 2001)
- Company: Kadokawa Shoten
- Country: Japan
- Language: Japanese
- Website: https://web-ace.jp/gundamace/

Gundam Ace (Japanese: ガンダムエース, Hepburn: Gandamu Eesu) is a monthly Japanese shōnen manga magazine published by Kadokawa Shoten. It largely focuses on the Gundam franchise. There was a Chinese version published by Kadokawa Media (Taiwan) Co., Ltd, discontinued in 2008.

== Overview ==
Gundam Ace started as a quarterly publication from 2001 to 2002, moved to a bi-monthly publication in 2003, and became a monthly publication in 2004. The producer is Shinichirou Inoue of Kadokawa Shoten who also produces Newtype and Monthly Shonen Ace. The chief editor is Hideaki Kobayashi.

The magazine contains a number of common features found in official fan magazines, including news on upcoming Gundam series and merchandise.

== Currently serialized titles ==
- Mobile Suit Gundam-san (Since August 2001)
- Mobile Suit Gundam École du Ciel (Since December 2001)
- Mobile Suit Crossbone Gundam (Since November 2002)
- SEED Club 4-Koma (Since December 2004)
- Gundam Unicorn: Bande Dessinée (Since March 2010)
- Gundam MSV-R: The Return of Johnny Ridden (Since June 2010)
- Gundam Wing: Frozen Teardrop (Since August 2010)
- Super-Class! Mobile Fighter G Gundam (Since September 2010)
- Gundam Wing Endless Waltz: The Glory of Losers (Since November 2010)
- Mobile Suit Zeta Gundam DEFINE (Since August 2011)
- Mobile Suit Gundam SEED Re: and Destiny Ninja (Since June 2012)
- Gundam MSV-R: The Fabulous Shin Matsunaga! (Since August 2012)
- Char's Daily Life (Since September 2012)
- People of Gundam (Since December 2012)
- Mobile Suit Gundam U.C. 0094: Across the Sky (Since January 2013)
- Mobile Suit Gundam: The Nameless Battlefield (Since May 2013)
- Mobile Suit Gundam 0083 REBELLION (Since August 2013)
- Gundam Build Fighters AMAZING (Since December 2013)
- Mobile Suit Gundam Side Story: Missing Link (Since April 2014)
- Gundam EXA VS (Since May 2014)
- Gundam Reconguista in G (Since October 2014)
- Mobile Suit Gundam: Iron-Blooded Orphans And Slayer (Since October 2015)

== Featured manga ==
Many of the manga titles running in the magazine serve as promotion (adaptations based on recent games, animated series side stories, etc.) or parody the Gundam series/fandom.

- Mobile Suit Gundam: The Origin
- Mobile Suit Gundam: Char's Deleted Affair - Portrait of Young Comet
- Axis' Hamaan-san
- Mobile Suit Gundam: Lost War Chronicles
- Mobile Suit Gundam Gaiden : Sora, senkou no hate ni...
- Gundam Legacy
- Mobile Suit Gundam: Ixtab of Space
- Mobile Suit Gundam École du Ciel (ongoing)
- Mobile Suit Gundam SEED Astray
- Mobile Suit Gundam SEED X Astray
- Mobile Suit Gundam SEED Destiny Astray
- Mobile Suit Gundam SEED C.E. 73 Δ Astray
- After War Gundam X: Under the Moonlight
- Mobile Suit Gundam SEED Destiny -The Edge-
- Mobile Suit Gundam: Ore wa Renppou Guren Tai
- Mobile Suit Gundam-san
- Tony Takezaki's Gundam manga
- Inu Gundam
- Mobile Suit Buyo Gundam
- Imouto Gundam
- Mobile Suit Gundam Climax U.C. - Tsumuga re shi kettou
- Mobile Suit Gundam ZZ Gaiden: Zion no genyou
- Mobile Suit Crossbone Gundam: The Steel Seven
- Mobile Suit Gundam MS IGLOO: Revelations 0079
- Developers Mobile Suit Gundam Before One Year War
- Mobile Suit Z Gundam: Day After Tomorrow - Kai Shinden's report
- Gunota no Onna
- Operation Troy
- The Wings of Rean
- Mobile Suit Gundam 00F
- Mobile Suit Gundam 00I
- New Mobile Report Gundam Wing: Frozen Teardrop (ongoing)
- New Mobile Report Gundam Wing: Glory of the Defeated
- Arasa OL Haman-sama (The Thirty-ish Office Worker Haman-sama) by Masakazu Iwasaki (since January 2021) – reimagines Haman Karn as a "modern corporate section chief at an apparel company".
- Ral Meshi ~Ramba Ral no Haitoku Gohan~ (Ral Feasts ~Ramba Ral's Immoral Meal~) by Kazuya Tani (since January 2021) – "gourmet manga showing Zeon ace Ramba Ral tending to the Club Eden night club while the staff are away"
- Amuro to Boku by Osamui Wakai and Satoshi Takemiya (since December 2020)

== Non-manga columns ==
- Data Gundam
- Ages of Gundam
- Okawara Factory
- Gundam Goods Navigation
- Gundam Game Information
- GUNDAM"ACE"FIX
- GAME'S MSV

== Giveaways ==
Most issues of Gundam Ace contain at least one 'free gift' item. These may be used to promote a current Gundam work or based on original manga appearing in the magazine. In the three months leading up to the premiere of Mobile Suit Gundam 00, the magazine gave away a 00 pencil board, sticker sheet and poster. A continuing series has been keychains depicting Mobile Suit Gundam characters as chickens, based on a popular manga of the same concept. Other items given away include CM collection CD-ROMs, exclusive alternate manga cover sleeves and cardboard calendar cubes.

== Circulation ==
Time period	Monthly circulation	Sales	Revenue (JPY)	Revenue (USD)
2004	211,416	2,536,992	¥1,775,894,400	$153,364,975
2005	209,292	2,511,504	¥1,758,052,800	$153,364,975
2006	195,500	2,346,000	¥1,642,200,000	$153,364,975
2007	184,750	2,217,000	¥1,551,900,000	$153,364,975
April 2008 to June 2008	180,000	540,000	¥378,000,000	$153,364,975
July 2008 to September 2008	175,000	525,000	¥367,500,000	$153,364,975
October 2008 to September 2009	161,417	1,937,004	¥1,355,902,800	$153,364,975
October 2009 to September 2010	135,417	1,625,004	¥1,355,902,800	$153,364,975
October 2010 to September 2011	133,584	1,603,008	¥1,122,105,600	$153,364,975
October 2011 to September 2012	110,667	1,328,004	¥929,602,800	$153,364,975
October 2012 to September 2013	120,000	1,440,000	¥1,008,000,000	$19,028,781
October 2013 to September 2014	120,000	1,440,000	¥1,008,000,000	$19,028,781
October 2014 to September 2015	120,000	1,440,000	¥1,008,000,000	$18,530,621
October 2015 to September 2016	120,000	1,440,000	¥1,008,000,000	$18,530,621
October 2016 to September 2017	120,000	1,440,000	¥1,008,000,000	$9,184,510
Total known sales		22,337,266	¥17,277,061,200	$199,911,612

== Controversy ==
=== Removed mention of same-sex marriage in The Witch from Mercury ===
In the July 26, 2023, issue of Gundam Ace magazine an interview with Mobile Suit Gundam: The Witch from Mercury's voice cast included a quote from Kana Ichinose in which she referenced Suletta Mercury and Miorine Rembran's marriage. While the wedding itself was not depicted on-screen, the characters are shown wearing wedding rings in the final scene of the series, with Suletta's sister Eri referring to herself as Miorine's sister-in-law. Miorine was also directly referenced as Suletta's wife by the official English-language Gundam Twitter account on the day of the finale. Previously, this account also posted tweets either in support of the main characters' romantic relationship or with an implied condemnation of other fan 'ships' with the heroines.

Following the release of the magazine interview, the hashtag スレミオ結婚 (SuleMio Marriage) trended in Japan.

However, days later the digital version of the Gundam Ace interview was edited to remove the direct reference to marriage, causing an immediate backlash from fans who claimed the characters' status as a married couple was being deliberately censored.

On July 30 a statement was released by Kadokawa, publishers of Gundam Ace, in which they claimed the discrepancy was a "proofreading mistake" and that the marriage reference was based on "editorial speculation". An accompanying statement was released on the official Witch from Mercury website in which these claims were repeated, in addition to implying the events of the series are open to interpretation by viewers, leading to angry or confused responses from fans and general viewers who pointed out Suletta and Miorine's marriage was objectively confirmed both in the anime's final scene and by the characters' voice actors in an audio commentary for the final episode, and as such no room for 'interpretation' exists.
