= List of Mobile Suit Gundam 00 chapters =

The Japanese anime television series Mobile Suit Gundam 00 has been adapted into a number of manga and light novel series.

== Manga ==
Cover to Mobile Suit Gundam 00P

=== Mobile Suit Gundam 00P ===
A graphic novel serialized in Dengeki Hobby Magazine, featuring events before the main story. Story by Tomohiro Chiba, model conduction by Dengeki Hobby Magazine. The first volume was released in May 2008 by Dengeki Hobby.

=== Mobile Suit Gundam 00F ===
Manga serialized in Gundam Ace starting in December 2007. It is a side story with art by Kōichi Tokita. It also tries to link the main story to the 2 other side-stories and introduces the characters and mecha from them. First volume was released on March 26, 2008, by Kadokawa Comics. The U.S. version of the manga will be published by Bandai Entertainment and will be available mid-2009 Upon the series conclusion, it has been replaced with Mobile Suit Gundam 00I in Gundam Ace Magazine.

=== Mobile Suit Gundam 00I ===
Following the conclusion of Mobile Suit Gundam 00F in Gundam Ace, the series was replaced by Mobile Suit Gundam 00I. The series takes placing during the second season of the main anime series and reveals the true purpose of the "Innovades" in relation to bringing forth "Innovators".

=== Mobile Suit Gundam 00V ===
Graphic novel serialized in Hobby Japan. It is told in the format of a mobile suit development history book published 20 years after the anime series, featuring photo guides of customized models.

=== Mobile Suit Gundam 00 ===
Two TV broadcast-based manga series exist to date. One is serialized in Kerokero Ace and drawn by Kouzoh Ohmori. Minor changes are present compared to the anime, such as the use of more visually comedic facial expressions. First volume was released on March 26, 2008, by Kadokawa Comics. The other manga adaptation series of the same name is also based on the television series, and is drawn by Oto Taguchi. The two manga series essentially follow the same story as the anime's main plot, but vary in the sequence of events that unfold (for example, certain battles and events in the anime were skipped over in the Kouzoh Ohmori manga) and are drawn under different artistic styles. With the past New York Comic Convention, Bandai Entertainment has confirmed that they have acquired the rights to Kouzuh Ohmori's manga adaptation.

No.	Original release date	Original ISBN	English release date	English ISBN
01	—	—	—	978-1-604961-78-2
01. "Celestial Being"; 02. "Gundam Meisters"; 03. "The Seven Swords"; Setting Information

=== Mobile Suit Gundam 00: Aoi Kioku ===
Another manga series based on the anime, Mobile Suit Gundam 00: Aoi Kioku, focuses on the Gundam Meisters' memories, present and past lives. This series is illustrated by Tarō Shiguma and is serialized in Gundam Ace.
