= Mobile Suit Gundam 0083: Stardust Memory =

Japanese original video animation (OVA) series

- Theatrical poster of the compilation film The Last Blitz of Zeon/Afterglow of Zeon

機動戦士ガンダム0083 STARDUST MEMORY (Kidō Senshi Gandamu Daburuōeitīsurī Sutādasuto Memorī)
- Genre: Mecha, military science fiction,
- Original video animation
- Directed by: Mitsuko Kase (eps. 1-7); Takashi Imanishi (eps. 2-13)
- Written by: Fuyunori Gobu (eps. 1-4); Akinori Endo (eps. 5-7); Ryōsuke Takahashi (eps. 8-10); Asahide Ookuma (eps. 11-13)
- Music by: Mitsuo Hagita
- Studio: Sunrise
- Licensed by: NA: Sunrise
- Released: May 23, 1991 – September 24, 1992
- Episodes: 13
- Anime film

Mobile Suit Gundam 0083: The Last Blitz of Zeon
- Directed by: Takashi Imanishi
- Studio: Sunrise
- Licensed by: NA: Sunrise
- Released: August 29, 1992
- Runtime: 120 minutes
- Manga

Mobile Suit Gundam 0083: Rebellion
- Written by: Takashi Imanishi
- Illustrated by: Masato Natsumoto
- Published by: Kadokawa Shoten
- Magazine: Gundam Ace
- Original run: June 26, 2013 – May 26, 2023
- Volumes: 18

Mobile Suit Gundam 0083: Stardust Memory (Japanese: 機動戦士ガンダム0083 STARDUST MEMORY, Hepburn: Kidō Senshi Gandamu Daburuōeitīsurī Sutādasuto Memorī) is a 13-episode anime OVA series set in the Gundam universe. The first volume containing two 30-minute episodes was released in Japan on May 23, 1991. Subsequent volumes, containing one 30-minute episode each, followed every one or two months; the final volume went on sale on September 24, 1992. The series was directed by Mitsuko Kase (episodes 1–7) and Takashi Imanishi (episodes 8–13). A movie compilation, also directed by Imanishi was released in Japan on August 29, 1992, a month before the final OVA volume went on sale. The characters were designed by Toshihiro Kawamoto. Mechanical designs were by Shoji Kawamori (of Macross fame) and Hajime Katoki.

Gundam 0083:Stardust Memory was licensed in North America by Bandai Entertainment and was available on VHS and DVD. The OVA series aired on Cartoon Network's Adult Swim in 2002.

== Plot ==
The year is Universal Century 0083, and three years have passed after the One Year War ended with the Principality of Zeon's defeat. The Delaz Fleet, a group of Zeon remnants, launches an attack on the Earth Federation's Torrington Base, stealing the prototype Gundam GP02A "Physalis", a mobile suit with nuclear launch capability. Kou Uraki, a test pilot at Torrington Base, becomes the pilot for the Gundam GP01 "Zephyranthes", and joins the Pegasus-class carrier Albion as it pursues the stolen GP02A to stop the Delaz Fleet's ultimate goal: "Operation Stardust".

== Characters ==
=== Main characters ===
Mora Bascht, Chap Adel, Bernard Monsha, Kou Uraki, Chuck Keith, Alpha A. Bait

Kou Uraki (コウ・ウラキ)
Voiced by: Ryō Horikawa (Japanese); Paul Stephen (English)
Main mecha: RX-78GP01 Gundam GP01 "Zephyranthes"; RX-78GP01Fb Gundam GP01Fb "Zephyranthes" Full Burnern; RX-78GP03 Gundam GP03 "Dendrobium"
Other mecha: MS-06F-2 Zaku II F2
A 19-year-old Federation test pilot stationed at the Torrington base in Australia. When Anavel Gato steals the Gundam GP02A, Kou goes after him in the Gundam GP01. He is later assigned to the Albion's mobile suit team under the command of Lieutenant South Burning with orders to either recapture or destroy the GP02A. Uraki matures during his stay aboard the Albion and develops a relationship with Anaheim Electronics systems engineer Nina Purpleton.

Anavel Gato (アナベル・ガトー, Anaberu Gatō)
Voiced by: Akio Ōtsuka (Japanese); Kirk Thornton (English)
Main mecha: RX-78GP02A Gundam GP02A "Physalis"; AMX-002 Neue Ziel
Other mecha: MS-14A Gelgoog; YMS-09R-2 Prototype Rick Dom Zwei
A former member of the Principality of Zeon's elite palace guard unit. At the Battle of Solomon during the One Year War, Gato earned the nickname "Nightmare of Solomon". He joined Aiguille Delaz's fleet late in the war and departed with them following the fall of A Baoa Qu. Gato returns to Earth in October U.C. 0083 to seize the Gundam GP02A with the intent to use this mobile suit's nuclear weapon against the Federation's Naval Review. It is later revealed he had once been romantically involved with Nina Purpleton at some point prior to the events depicted in the OVA.

Nina Purpleton (ニナ・パープルトン, Nina Pāpuruton)
Voiced by: Rei Sakuma (Japanese); Dorothy Elias-Fahn (English)
A 21-year-old Anaheim Electronics systems engineer in charge of the project that developed the two Gundams, which she is extremely protective over. She reluctantly allows Uraki to pilot the Gundam GP01 in order to recapture the Gundam GP02A and they both slowly begin a romantic relationship.

=== Albion crew ===
Eyphar Sinapus (エイパー・シナプス, Eipā Shinapusu)
Voiced by: Chikao Otsuka (Japanese); Simon Prescott (English)
The captain of the ship Albion, which is given the tall order of recapturing the stolen Gundam GP02A. During Operation Stardust, Sinapus goes against Federation orders and acquires the GP03 Dendrobium to stop the Delaz Fleet from fulfilling their mission. In the aftermath of the operation, Sinapus is charged with mutiny and sentenced to death.

South Burning (サウス・バニング, Sausu Baningu)
Voiced by: Masashi Sugawara (Japanese); Paul St. Peter (English)
Mecha: RGM-79C GM Type C; RGM-79N GM Custom
A 39-year-old senior pilot at the Federation's Torrington base, Lieutenant South Burning serves as mobile suit company commander for the Albion. He serves as a mentor for the rookies Kou Uraki and Chuck Keith. Burning dies in the eighth episode when his GM suddenly explodes after a brief encounter with Cima Garahau, but not before picking up a briefcase carrying details of what is known as "Operation Stardust."

Chuck Keith (チャック・キース, Chakku Kīsu)
Voiced by: Yoshiharu Yamada (Japanese); Sean Mitchell (English)
Mecha: RGC-83 GM Cannon II; MS-06F-2 Zaku II F2; MS-14F Gelgoog Marine
Uraki's wingman at Torrington Base, he is likewise reassigned to the Albion as part of its mobile suit team. Over the course of the series, he has a romantic connection with Albion chief mechanic Mora Bascht. After the events of Operation Stardust, Keith is reassigned to Oakly Base in North America.

Bernard Monsha (ベルナルド・モンシア, Berunarudo Monshia)
Voiced by: Chafurin (Japanese); Dougary Grant (English)
Mecha: RGM-79N GM Custom
One of three mobile suit pilots assigned to the Albion after the Delaz Fleet's assault on Torrington. Monsha takes an immediate dislike to Uraki and Keith, especially Kou for being chosen to pilot the Gundam GP01 despite a lack of experience. When he is not on duty, Monsha likes to drink, gamble, and chase women, and often sexually harasses Nina.

Alpha A. Bait (アルファ・A・ベイト, Arufa Ē Beito)
Voiced by: Kōji Totani (Japanese); Mike D'Gord (English)
Mecha: RGM-79N GM Custom
Another reinforcement pilot who served under Lieutenant Burning alongside Monsha and Adel during the One Year War. Although he is calmer and less obnoxious than Monsha, Bait has a tendency to encourage his friend's misbehavior, but that does not prevent him from being promoted to deputy commander of the mobile suit team. He and Monsha, plus the rest of the Albion's bridge crew is eventually drafted into the Titans.

Chap Adel (チャップ・アデル, Chappu Aderu)
Voiced by: Yūji Mikimoto (Japanese); Daran Norris (English)
Mecha: RGC-83 GM Cannon II
The third reinforcement pilot assigned to the Albion and the most mild-mannered of the three.

Mora Bascht (モーラ・バシット, Mōra Bashitto)
Voiced by: Kazue Ikura (Japanese); Mari Devon (English)
A tall, big-boned female mechanic who serves as chief of maintenance aboard the Albion and friend to Nina. She takes a liking to Chuck ever since she met him.

Ivan Pasarov (イワン・パサロフ, Iwan Pasarofu)
Voiced by: Kazuhiko Kishino; Ryuji Nakagi (episode 1)
The Albion's helmsman.

Jacqueline Simone (ジャクリーヌ・シモン, Jakurīnu Shimon)
Voiced by: Kae Araki
A bridge officer of the Albion.

Peter Scott (ピーター・スコット, Pītā Sukotto)
Voiced by: Masami Kikuchi (Japanese); Jonathan Fahn (English)
A bridge officer of the Albion.

Akram Harida (アクラム・ハリダ, Akuramu Harida)
Voiced by: Daiki Nakamura
The Albion's navigator.

William Morris (ウィリアム・モーリス, Uiriamu Mōrisu)
Voiced by: Naoki Makishima (Japanese); Jonathan C. Osborne (English)
A communications officer of the Albion.

=== Earth Federation ===
John Cowen (ジョン・コーウェン, Jon Kōuen)
Voiced by: Takeshi Watabe (Japanese); Beau Billingslea (English)
A Federation Admiral stationed at Jaburo base who is the Albion's direct contact. Cowen is arrested under Jamitov Hyman's orders for insubordination during the final phase of Operation Stardust.

Nakahha Nakato (ナカッハ・ナカト)
Voiced by: Shinya Ōtaki (Japanese); Richard Cansino (English)
A Federation Major stationed at the La Vie en Rose space station. He kills Anaheim Electronics engineer Lucette Audevie while preventing Uraki from boarding the GP03 Dendrobium before he is ordered to drop his gun by Captain Synapse and his men.

=== Principality of Zeon ===
Aiguille Delaz (エギーユ・デラーズ, Egīyu Derāzu)
Voiced by: Kiyoshi Kobayashi (Japanese); Richard Barnes (English)
Commander of the Delaz Fleet (デラーズ・フリート, Derāzu Furīto). A strong supporter of Gihren Zabi's ideals, self-promoted Vice-Admiral Delaz was a colonel of a Zeon flotilla during the One Year War. He refuses to join the survivors retreating to Axis and spends the next three years in a secret colony base called the Garden of Thorns (茨の園, Ibara no En). Delaz initiates Operation Stardust (星の屑作戦, Hoshi no Kuzu Sakusen) as a means to undermine the security of the Earth Federation. He dies at Cima Garahau's hands in Episode 12 after encouraging Gato to push ahead with the colony drop.

Cima Garahau (シーマ・ガラハウ, Shīma Garahau)
Voiced by: Mari Mashiba (Japanese); Carol Stanzione (English)
Mecha: MS-14Fs Gelgoog Marine Commander Type; AGX-04 Gerbera Tetra
Commander of a renegade group of former Zeon marines who is invited by Delaz to join Operation Stardust. It is later revealed that Cima is working for the Earth Federation, as she had felt betrayed by the Principality of Zeon when her home colony was evacuated and converted into a colony laser. Cima takes Delaz hostage during the final phase of Operation Stardust and executes him after he urges Gato to proceed; shortly thereafter, she is killed by Uraki when her Gerbera Tetra is impaled by the beam cannon of Uraki's GP03 Dendrobium.

Kelly Layzner (ケリィ・レズナー, Kerii Rezunā)
Voiced by: Tesshō Genda (Japanese); Richard Epcar (English)
Mecha: MA-06 Val-Walo
A former Zeon lieutenant and comrade of Gato who had lost his left arm in the One Year War. After Uraki is beaten up by hoodlums in Von Braun City, he winds up at Kelly's home in the city's junkyard, where they work together to repair Kelly's Val-Walo mobile armor despite being aware that they might soon meet in battle. Upon discovering that Cima does not intend to convey him to the Delaz Fleet due to his disability, Kelly launches the Val-Walo to challenge the Gundam GP01Fb. He is defeated by Uraki and dies in the mobile armor's explosion, having never installed an escape system.

=== Anaheim Electronics ===
O'Sullivan (オサリバン, Osariban)
Voiced by: Osamu Ichikawa (Japanese); Sam Strong (English)
An Anaheim Electronics Director based in Von Braun. Despite supporting the Federation, he secretly makes deals with Cima Garahau to supply her fleet with resources such as the Gerbera Tetra prototype mobile suit. In the aftermath of Operation Stardust, O'Sullivan commits suicide in his office.

Lucette Audevie (ルセット・オデビー, Rusetto Odebī)
Voiced by: Masako Katsuki
An Anaheim Electronics systems engineer in charge of the GP03 Dendrobium at La Vie en Rose. Lucette shows high interest in assigning the GP03 Dendrobium to Uraki, despite Nina's objections. She is killed by Nakahha Nakato while helping Uraki board the Gundam prototype.

Nick Orville (ニック・オービル, Nikku Ōbiru)
Voiced by: Yoku Shioya (Japanese); Jack Emmet (English)
An Anaheim Electronics employee stationed aboard the Albion is revealed to be a Zeon spy. Orville escapes from the Albion and attempts to make contact with the Kimbareid forces in Africa, but is shot down to prevent the Albion from discovering the location of the secret Zeon base.

=== Others ===
Latuera Chapra (ラトーラ・チャプラ, Ratōra Chapura)
Voiced by: Yuko Kobayashi (Japanese); Lia Sargent (English)
Kelly Layzner's girlfriend, who is completely against him returning to battle.

== Media ==
=== Anime ===
From episodes 1-7, the opening theme is "The Winner" by Miki Matsubara while the ending theme is "Magic" by Jacob Wheeler. From episodes 8-13, the opening theme is "Men of Destiny" by MIO while the ending theme is "Evergreen" by MIO. For episodes 1 & 6, "Back to Paradise" by Miki Matsubara was used as a insert song.

No.	Title	Original release date	English air date
1	"Gundamjack"; Transliteration: "Gandamu Gōdatsu" (Japanese: ガンダム強奪)	May 23, 1991	February 23, 2002
In the prologue (set during the Battle of A Bao A Qu in December U.C. 0079), Zeon ace pilot Anavel Gato returns from combat to find Admiral Aiguille Delaz telling him of the deaths of Gihren and Kycilia Zabi, as the Zeon forces surrender. Despite the shock defeat, both men retreat and plan the return of Zeon. In October U.C. 0083, the Federation space carrier Albion delivers two Gundam Development Project (GDP) prototypes, the RX-78 GP01 Zephyranthes and the GP02A Physalis, to the Torrington Base in Australia for ground testing under the aegis of Anaheim Electronics engineer Nina Purpleton. Because of relaxed security, a Zeon mole helps Gato infiltrate the base and hijack the GP02 just after its nuclear weapon is loaded in the middle of the night. Having witnessed Gato activate the mobile suit, Ensign Kou Uraki takes over the Zephyranthes and prepares to face him just as Zeon forces assault the base.
2	"Endless Pursuit"; Transliteration: "Owarinaki Tsuigeki" (Japanese: 終わりなき追撃)	June 27, 1991	March 2, 2002
After a failed confrontation with Gato at the Torrington Base, Kou, his friend Chuck and veterans South Burning and Dick Allen follow Gato through the outback in an attempt to recapture the Physalis. Zeon forces ambush them and kill Allen as Gato awaits a Komusai shuttle for extraction. Kou destroys the shuttle, but his efforts were in vain - the forces of Zeon had another avenue of escape prepared in the form of a submarine that provided covering fire during the Torrington base attack. Federation forces led by Burning managed to corner Gato, but it was all for naught as the wily Zeon pilot makes his escape on the submarine, leaving Kou's first battle marked with disgrace.
3	"Into Battle, Albion!"; Transliteration: "Shutsugeki Arubion" (Japanese: 出撃アルビオン)	August 22, 1991	March 9, 2002
Back at Torrington, Federation Vice Admiral John Cowen assigns Burning to lead the Albion's pursuit of Gato with a new crew of pilots to help him. Kou and Keith join the mission. Lt Bernard Monsha, one of the new additions, doubts Kou's capability to fly the GP01. Despite Nina's assurance that Kou handled the mobile suit well, Monsha challenges him to a first-shot mobile suit duel to see who better deserves to pilot the Zephyranthes. Although Kou wins the match, Burning intervenes and sends both pilots to one week in the brig. Meanwhile, Gato heads for the Kinbareid diamond mine in East Africa, which is still occupied by Zeon holdouts from the One Year War.
4	"Attack and Retreat on the Burning Sand"; Transliteration: "Nessa no Kōbōsen" (Japanese: 熱砂の攻防戦)	September 26, 1991	March 16, 2002
Somewhere in East Africa, the Albion goes on patrol, while Monsha faces Albion chief engineer Mora Bascht's wrath for hitting on the ship's female crew and trying to sabotage Kou's landing after his search patrol. Gato arrives at Kinbareid and boosts the morale of the soldiers. Meanwhile, Orville - the Zeon mole who helped Gato's infiltration in the first episode - has been unmasked and flies out in a Core Fighter II to warn Kinbareid of the Albion's patrols but could not find the base complex and is shot down by a Zaku patrol. The Zeon forces mobilize and attack the Albion to buy time for Gato and the GP02 to fly into orbit using one Heavy Launch Vehicle still in the base. The base holdouts surrender as soon as Gato flies away.
5	"Gundam, to the Sea of Stars"; Transliteration: "Gandamu, Hoshi no Umi he" (Japanese: ガンダム、星の海へ)	October 24, 1991	March 23, 2002
Gato flies back to the Garden of Thorns, a secret Zeon colony base in the Shoal Zone, to present the GP02 to Delaz. However, a chance encounter with Zeon commander Cima Garahau rankles him when their ships almost collide. Upon delivering the GP02, Delaz makes an Earth Sphere-wide declaration of war, explaining that the GP02 and its nuclear weapon is proof of the Earth Federation's military buildup. Meanwhile, aboard the Albion, Nina tries to get closer to a dense Kou when the alert sounds. Kou and the rest of the Albion's mobile suit pilots engage the Zeon intruders. However, Nina's warning about the GP-01's poor mobility in space without the so-called Full Vernian backpack proves true as Kou crash lands in the Albion under heavy damage.
6	"The Warrior of Von Braun"; Transliteration: "Fon Buraun no Senshi" (Japanese: フォン・ブラウンの戦士)	November 21, 1991	March 30, 2002
The Albion arrives at Von Braun City on the Moon to have the GP01 upgraded to Full Vernian while the crew goes on shore leave. A snide comment from Monsha at a bar prompts Kou to wander around the city where he is beaten up by some thugs. A one-armed man named Kelly Layzner rescues him and brings him to a junkyard where he lives with his lover. Kou learns of Kelly's origins as a Zeon pilot and helps him fix a Val Varo mobile armor that has been hidden for years. He returns to the Albion and begins testing the Full Vernian-equipped GP01. Elsewhere in the city, Cima blackmails Anaheim boss Gilbert O'Sullivan with a colony drop if he talks to the Federation about her. She also tells Kelly to get the Val Varo ready for action.
7	"With Shining Blue Fire"; Transliteration: "Aoku Kagayaku Honō de" (Japanese: 蒼く輝く炎で)	February 20, 1992	April 6, 2002
Cima's blackmailing apparently works, as Anaheim asks Nina to be reassigned away from the Albion and out of the mobile suit development team altogether. Keith, who dates Mora, offers Kou movie tickets so he can ask Nina out after a field test. He does make a move, but a remark about the tests angers Nina again. Meanwhile, Kelly gets paid in gold bullion for his work on the Val Varo, but is shocked to hear that the Zeon forces do not want him piloting it for the new campaign. Incensed, Kelly takes out the mobile armor and challenges Kou to fight him so he could prove himself worthy of joining the Delaz Fleet again. When Nina gets in the way, Kou finally admits his feelings for her and defeats Kelly, who does not bail out from the exploding Val Varo because he never installed an escape system.
8	"Conspiracy Sector"; Transliteration: "Sakubō no Chūiki" (Japanese: 策謀の宙域)	April 23, 1992	April 13, 2002
A few days out of Von Braun, Burning continues to train Kou and Keith, who later eggs him to try giving Nina a chance. Keith also earns Mora's ire for showing him Monsha's private collection of Nina pictures. A resupply rendezvous by a Federation ship is cut short as the Albion detects the Federation flagship Birmingham, with Admiral Green Wyatt aboard - meeting with Cima. In the midst of the ensuing battle, Burning retrieves a briefcase that contains files for something called "Operation Stardust" and talks with Kou about them. However, a minor hit on Burning's GM Custom during the battle turns fatal, as the mobile suit careens out of control and explodes. Uraki is promoted to junior lieutenant as the crew mourns Burning's death.
9	"The Nightmare of Solomon"; Transliteration: "Soromon no Akumu" (Japanese: ソロモンの悪夢)	May 21, 1992	April 20, 2002
Kou and Keith continue to fight Zeon forces while on patrol near Konpeitoh (Solomon). As Delaz welcomes the Axis Advance Fleet into the Earth Sphere, Gato prepares for his own part of an attack on Konpeitoh, which is hosting the Naval Review. The Delaz Fleet keeps probing the Federation defenses, keeping Kou occupied. A defense satellite detects Gato breaking through another sector and Uraki is ordered to intercept him before he crashes the Review. He fails to get to Gato in time, as the Zeon pilot fires the GP02's MK82 nuclear bazooka at the Federation fleet with the Birmingham in the center of his sights.
10	"Colliding War Zones"; Transliteration: "Gekitotsu Sen'iki" (Japanese: 激突戦域)	June 21, 1992	April 27, 2002
Gato retreats after the nuclear strike destroys two-thirds of the Federation's fleet, but runs into Kou. As Nina breaks down watching them fight, both of their mobile suits take heavy damage and the pilots flee before they explode. Meanwhile, Cima's fleet hijacks two colonies in transport and later blow off one mirror each from them. When the Albion crew is informed of the colonyjack, Nina correctly theorizes that the colonies will crash into each other, with one in direct course for the Moon. She also reveals the existence of a third Gundam built under the GDP.
11	"La Vie En Rose"; Transliteration: "Ra Bi An Rōzu" (Japanese: ラビアンローズ)	August 21, 1992	May 4, 2002
The Albion arrives at Anaheim Electronics' La Vie En Rose research ship to get the GP03 Dendrobium Stamen, where they are met by designer Lucette Auduvie and Federation officer Nakaha Nakato. Almost immediately, Nakato tells the crew that the GDP has been suspended and they are all confined to the Albion until further notice. Lucette shows Kou the GP03's diagrams and later sacrifices her life to stop Nakato killing Kou as he takes over the GP03 with the Albion crew's help and leave La Vie En Rose. Meanwhile, the Federation command expresses indifference at the upcoming Zeon colony drop on the Moon. The Konpeitoh survivors mobilize and try to stop it, but run out of fuel when Cima maneuvers to have Von Braun City's laser station activate the colony's engines to redirect it toward Earth. Gato also meets up with the Axis Advance Fleet, where he gets the massive Neue Ziel mobile armor and tries it against a small Federation patrol.
12	"Assault on the Point of No Return"; Transliteration: "Kyōshū, Soshi Genkaiten" (Japanese: 強襲、阻止限界点)	September 24, 1992	May 11, 2002
Kou and Gato, now in their mobile armors, finally take each other on as the Albion crew tries to stop the colony before it passes the minimum limit for terminal entry. Cima's crew takes Delaz hostage aboard his flagship, the Gwaden. At Jaburo, Vice Admiral Cowen desperately tries to convince Admiral Gene Colliny of mobilizing the military's full might to stop the colony, but Jamitov Hymen has Cowen taken away. Delaz discovers that the Federation has deployed the Solar System II mirror array past the terminal entry point and encourages Gato to see the operation before Cima kills him. Out of rage, Gato drives one of the Neue Ziel's claws at the Gwaden bridge.
13	"A Storm Raging Through"; Transliteration: "Kakenukeru Arashi" (Japanese: 駆け抜ける嵐)	September 24, 1992	May 18, 2002
The battle to stop the colony goes full-blast, with the Federation and Cima's forces working together to protect the Solar System II on one hand and the Delaz fleet shepherding the colony on the other while the Axis Advance Fleet stands back. Kou kills Cima in the fracas. The Solar System II fires, but Gato destroys the command ship, resulting in a weaker blast that barely damages the colony. As it breaks through the solar array, Gato enters the colony and inputs the final course corrections. Kou tries to stop him, but Nina interferes and protects Gato as they leave, revealing that they were once lovers. The two pilots continue to fight after Gato has Karius bring Nina to safety. The Solar System II remnants fire again, with many forces on both sides destroyed as the colony crashes into the Midwest. The Federation orders the Axis Advance Fleet to leave the Earth Sphere immediately, having overstayed their welcome, but Gato leads the Delaz Fleet survivors to attempt a breakthrough and dies in a kamikaze attack on a Federation ship. Several weeks later, Hymem and Bask Om announce the creation of the Titans. All records of Operation Stardust and the GP are erased, including Kou's one-year hard labor sentence. He eventually reunites with Nina, Keith, and Mora.

=== Compilation film ===
Just before the completion of the Mobile Suit Gundam 0083: Stardust Memory OVA in September 1992, the series was reformatted into a compilation film which was released under the title Mobile Suit Gundam 0083: The Afterglow of Zeon (ジオンの残光 Jion no Zankō), which opened in Japanese theaters on August 29, 1992. The ending theme is "True Shining" by Rumiko Wada. "Mon Etoil" by Rumiko Wada was used as a insert song.

=== Home media ===
A special VHS sneak peek of the first episode titled GxG Unit was given to advance ticket purchasers of Mobile Suit Gundam F91.

The series was reissued in DVD format in Japan on four volumes; the first R2 disc went on sale on January 25, 2000.

In 2006, a "5.1 ch DVD Box" was released in Japan. Along with remastered footage, this release featured a brand new audio track featuring completely re-recorded dialogue, altered sound effects and music and a new surround sound experience.

Bandai Entertainment licensed the series for the US market. The series was released on VHS in dubbed and subtitled versions in 1999 to coincide with the Gundam Big Bang Project. It spanned 7 VHS volumes and was also available in a box set. Volume 1 of the R1 DVD went on sale in January 2002. Cartoon Network premiered the series on U.S. television a month later on its Adult Swim Action block, where it remained until November 2002. Due to the closure of Bandai Entertainment, the OVAs have been out-of-print. On October 11, 2014, at their 2014 New York Comic Con panel, Sunrise announced they will be releasing all of the Gundam franchise, including Stardust Memory in North America through distribution via Right Stuf Inc., beginning in Spring 2015.

The compilation film was released on DVD in the UK, Ireland and throughout Europe by Beez Entertainment on 15 May 2006 under the title The Afterglow of Zeon. It was only in Japanese, but with a variety of subtitles, including English. It was released in North America in 2017.

Bandai Visual released a DVD boxed set in Japan on May 27, 2011, as part of the series' 20th anniversary.

The series later received a Blu-ray Box in Japan in 2016. This release contained both the original stereo 2.0 audio and the 2006 5.1 re-recording. It also included a two part picture drama entitled "Mayfly of Space" focusing on Cima Garahau and the Zeonic soldiers.

A Blu-Ray/DVD set based on this release was put out by Rightstuf on April 4, 2017, including both English and Japanese options, though the Japanese selections are only based on the 2006 "5.1 ch" re-recording.

=== Models ===
With the release of the original series in 1991, Bandai produced 1/144 scale model kits of the GP01 and GP01Fb, GP02A, GP03S, and AGX-04 Gerbera Tetra. All five units were later released in the 1/144 scale High Grade Universal Century (HGUC) line, which included a special version of the Gundam GP02A with an MLRS launcher and a Linkin Park edition of the Gundam GP01Fb. The GP03 Dendrobium was also released in 1/144 scale and in 1/550 scale alongside the Val-Walo and the Neue Ziel. At least six mobile suits from the series have been released either under Bandai's Master Grade (MG) line.

The GP01 and GP01Fb were released as part of the Perfect Grade (PG) line in 2003 and the Real Grade (RG) line in 2013 while the original version of the AGX-04 Gerbera Tetra, the Gundam GP04G Gerbera, was released in 2015 under the Reborn One-Hundred (RE/100) line.

=== Radio drama ===
Gundam 0083's canon includes two radio dramas on CD format billed as Cinema CDs. Both drama CDs were directed by series director Takashi with dialogue by Asahide Ōkuma (writer for 5 of the 0083 episodes).

Runga Offing Cannonade Battle (ルンガ沖砲撃戦, Runga-Oki Hōgekisen)
Runga Offing narrates events between Episodes 7 and 8, when the Albion engages a Chivvay-class Zeon warship. It introduces a new character named Aristide Hughes, the Albion's Gunnery Lieutenant.
Mayfly of Space (宇宙の蜉蝣, Uchū no Kagerō)
Mayfly of Space reveals Cima's backstory in flashbacks as she reflects on her past prior to the events of Episode 13. It reveals that Cima and her Marine Amphibious Unit (MAU) poisoned a Side 5 colony using G-3 nerve gas under orders, but were treated as pariahs afterwards by their own countrymen for committing such an atrocity. At the end of the war, her superior refused to let her retreat to Axis. Because their home colony Mahal had been converted into a weapon, Cima and her men were left stranded and homeless.

Both of these stories appear in the PlayStation 2 game Mobile Suit Gundam: Encounters in Space. Portions of Mayfly of Space were adapted into two animated short features; the first in 1993 and the second in 2016.

=== Print ===
Kadokawa Shoten released a three-part novelization of the series. Penned by Hiroshi Yamaguchi, the books contain illustrations by Toshihiro Kawamoto, Hirotoshi Sano, and Hajime Katoki. It was made available online via Book Walker on May 26, 2014.

Viz Communications also released all episodes in a comic book format from 1994 to 1995. However, instead of a manga, they used screenshots from each episode for the panels. Line art and descriptions of all units were inserted as well.

A manga reboot titled Mobile Suit Gundam 0083: Rebellion (機動戦士ガンダム0083 REBELLION, Kidō Senshi Gandamu Daburuōeitīsrī Riberion) began publication in Kadokawa Shoten's Gundam Ace on June 26, 2013. Volume 16 concluded the plot of the OVA with an original ending. Volume 17 started a spinoff sequel, that is non-canon to the anime continuity, about the return of Anavel Gato who survives Operation Stardust in the manga. The series concluded on May 26, 2023, and was compiled into 18 volumes in total. The manga was written by the OVA's director Takashi Imanishi and illustrated by Masato Natsumoto.

== Reception ==
Ollie Barder of Forbes wrote that while there were parts of the show that were disappointing, such as allegedly plaigarized music and some strange narrative missteps, that the series was well-made and helped shape Sunrise's future productions.

Preceded by Mobile Suit Gundam F91	Gundam metaseries (production order); 1991–1992	Succeeded by Mobile Suit Victory Gundam
Preceded by Mobile Suit Gundam 0080: War in the Pocket	Gundam Universal Century timeline U.C. 0083	Succeeded by Mobile Suit Zeta Gundam
