= Mobile Suit Crossbone Gundam =

Japanese manga series

- Cover of Mobile Suit Crossbone Gundam Volume 1

機動戦士クロスボーン・ガンダム (Kidō Senshi Kurosubōn Gandamu)
- Genre: Military science fiction
- Created by: Yoshiyuki Tomino
- Manga
- Written by: Yuichi Hasegawa
- Published by: Kadokawa Shoten
- Magazine: Shōnen Ace
- Original run: October 26, 1994 – January 25, 1997
- Volumes: 6
Further information
Manga
Mobile Suit Crossbone Gundam: Skull Heart
Written by	Yuichi Hasegawa
Published by	Kadokawa Shoten
Magazine	Gundam Ace
Original run	September 26, 2002 – August 26, 2004
Volumes	1
Manga
Mobile Suit Crossbone Gundam: The Steel Seven
Written by	Yuichi Hasegawa
Published by	Kadokawa Shoten
Magazine	Gundam Ace
Original run	July 26, 2006 – September 26, 2007
Volumes	3
Manga
Mobile Suit Crossbone Gundam: Ghost
Written by	Yuichi Hasegawa
Published by	Kadokawa Shoten
Magazine	Gundam Ace
Original run	November 26, 2011 – March 26, 2016
Volumes	12
Manga
Mobile Suit Crossbone Gundam: Dust
Written by	Yuichi Hasegawa
Published by	Kadokawa Shoten
Magazine	Gundam Ace
Original run	July 26, 2016 – December 26, 2020
Volumes	13
Manga
Mobile Suit Crossbone Gundam: X-11
Written by	Yuichi Hasegawa
Published by	Kadokawa Shoten
Magazine	Gundam Ace
Original run	June 26, 2021 – June 24, 2022
Volumes	2
Manga
Mobile Suit Crossbone Gundam: Love & Piece
Written by	Yuichi Hasegawa
Published by	Kadokawa Shoten
Magazine	Gundam Ace
Original run	October 26, 2022 – November 25, 2023
Volumes	2
Manga
Mobile Suit Crossbone Gundam: Seeräuber
Written by	Yuichi Hasegawa
Published by	Kadokawa Shoten
Magazine	Gundam Ace
Original run	October 25, 2024 – present
Volumes	3

Mobile Suit Crossbone Gundam (機動戦士クロスボーン・ガンダム, Kidō Senshi Kurosubōn Gandamu) is a six-volume manga series written and illustrated by Yuuichi Hasegawa based on notes and information by Yoshiyuki Tomino, serialized in Kadokawa Shoten's Shōnen Ace magazine from December 1994 to March 1997 issues. A sequel to the animated theatrical film Mobile Suit Gundam F91, Crossbone has been officially distributed only in Japan and Italy. Numerous sequels written and illustrated by Hasegawa without Tomino's involvement have been published in Gundam Ace.

== Plot ==
In Universal Century (UC) 0133, ten years after the events of F91, Crossbone Vanguard forces attack a transport ship called the Smashion as it heads to the space colonies run by the Jupiter Empire. Tobia Arronax, a 13-year-old boy aboard the ship, flies out in a Batara mobile suit to fight the Crossbone Vanguard, who have long been derided as space pirates. Unfortunately, he is captured by Crossbone Vanguard ace pilot Seabook Arno, who now goes by the name Kincade Nau and brought before their leader, Berah Ronah, who offers him to join the Vanguard or go to Jupiter and forget the attack.

Tobia decides to be with the Vanguard, who reveal to him that the Jupiter Empire has spent several years building up its military strength to destroy the Earth Federation, with whom it has a partnership. Now armed with this information, Tobia is trained in mobile suit piloting by Kincaid and to discover his own Newtype abilities. He flies into action as pilot of the XM-X3 Crossbone Gundam X-3 mobile suit.

== Characters ==
- Tobia Aronnax (トビア・アロナクス, Tobia Aronakusu): The series' main protagonist, Tobia is a young student from Earth sent to live in the Jupiter Empire colonies. As soon as he arrives on Jupiter, he becomes wrapped up in the Jupiter War after the new Crossbone Vanguard attacks his ship, causing him to hijack a Bataras mobile suit before encountering Kincaide Nau in the Crossbone X-1. The truth becomes harder to swallow after Tobia learns that his teacher, Prof. Karas, is a Jupiter Empire agent. Determined to end the war, Tobia is often short-tempered, letting his emotions get the best of him in battle, while Kincaide continues to help him. As Tobia joins the Crossbone Vanguard, he gets behind the controls of the Crossbone Gundam X-3. In later series he is known as Curtis Rothko (カーティス・ロスコ, Kātisu Rosuko).
- Kincade Nau (キンケドゥ・ナゥ, Kinkedō Nau) / Seabook Arno: The Gundam F91's former pilot and Tobia's mentor, Seabook was presumed dead in the wake of a terrorist attack on a Crossbone Vanguard ship five years after the events of F91. By the time of Crossbone Gundam, he and Berah Ronah are running a new Crossbone Vanguard as a pirate force attacking Jupiter Empire ships.
- Berah Ronah (ベラ・ロナ, Bera Rona) / Cecily Fairchild: Another character from F91, Berah comes from the Ronah family who founded the Crossbone Vanguard. After the collapse of the original Crossbone Vanguard, she and Seabook were presumed dead during an incident in UC 0128. The two spend the next five years assembling a new Crossbone Vanguard to attack the Jupiter Empire, with Berah leading the group from aboard the Mother Vanguard 2. Kind, calm and a skilled commander, Berah still cares deeply for Seabook.
- Bernadette Briett (ベルナデット・ブリエット, Berunadetto Burieto): A young girl who, after arriving on Jupiter at the same time as Tobia, later stows away on board the Mother Vanguard. Kind, quiet, and highly concerned for Tobia's safety, Briett wishies to visit Earth, her mother's birthplace. The Crossbone Vanguard discovers she is Tetenith Dogatie (テテニス・ドゥガチ, Tetenisu Dugachi), daughter of Jupiter Empire leader Crux Dogatie.
- Zabine Chareux (ザビーネ・シャル, Zabīne Sharu): The third returning character from F91, Zabine serves with Berah's Crossbone Vanguard as the pilot of the Crossbone Gundam X-2. However, he still carries a grudge against Seabook. Unknown to everyone else, he is working for the revival of the original Crossbone Vanguard's plans for "Cosmo Babylonia", out of disillusionment with the ideals espoused by Berah's Vanguard.
- Crux Dogatie (クラックス・ドゥガチ, Kurakkusu Dugachi): The Jupiter Empire's supreme leader, Dogatie is maintaining a peaceful alliance with the Earth Federation while covertly assembling his army for a strike against the Earth Sphere.

== Sequels ==
Crossbone Gundam has seven sequels, all written and illustrated by Yuichi Hasegawa without Tomino's involvement and published in Gundam Ace:

- Mobile Suit Crossbone Gundam: Skull Heart (2002–2004): set three years after the ending of Crossbone Gundam, featuring short vignettes detailing further adventures of the Crossbone Vanguard. One story features an appearance from an aged Judau Ashta, the main protagonist of Mobile Suit Gundam ZZ.
- Mobile Suit Crossbone Gundam: The Steel Seven (2006–2007): set a short time after the events of Skull Heart, the three-volume series introduces Bernadette's step-mother Europa, who flees to Earth to warn the Vanguard that the Jupiter Empire is planning to destroy the planet using a massive colony laser called "Zeus' Wrath". The danger prompts Tobia to find a way to get to Jupiter and form an elite team of pilots to destroy the laser system.
- Mobile Suit Crossbone Gundam: Ghost (2011–2016): set around the events of the 1993–1994 TV series Mobile Suit Victory Gundam. The series introduces new characters: Font Baud, a Mobile Suit enthusiast; Curtis Rothko, a blind operative of Jupiter's "Serpiente Tacon" special forces command; and Belle, the daughter of one of Jupiter's leading families, and apparently Curtis' own daughter. The plot revolves around Curtis' efforts to protect Font from Zanscare Empire troops after he discovers information about the Angel Halo superweapon. Things are complicated by the appearance of a Crossbone Gundam mobile suit, even though all units were believed destroyed in the climax of The Steel Seven.
- Mobile Suit Cross Born Gundam: Dust (2016–2020): set sixteen years after Mobile Suit Victory Gundam. The weaknesses of the Earth Federation have been exposed. Various space colonies, outside the reach of the weakened Federation, begin to fight each other and establish their own autonomous governments. Technology has regressed, as the Earth Sphere plunges into turmoil as various wars break out.
- Mobile Suit Crossbone Gundam: X-11 (2021–2022): set during the events of Dust in the Jupiter Sphere, and tells the story of what Curtis Rothko was doing, depicting his "final battle".
- Mobile Suit Crossbone Gundam: Love & Piece (2022–2023): an anthology of side-stories featuring characters from Crossbone Gundam. The first part is a prequel about Karras, an agent of the Jupiter Empire.
- Mobile Suit Crossbone Gundam: Seeräuber (2024–present): set four years after Dust. Peace returns to the Earth Sphere, while technology progresses again.

== Crossbone Gundam in other media ==
The characters and mecha of Crossbone Gundam often appear in the SD Gundam G Generation video game series. The series also appears in 2nd Super Robot Wars Alpha, part of the long-running Super Robot Wars franchise; it is the first non-animated series to be given plot significance in a Super Robot Wars game. In 2010, Crossbone Gundam appeared in Another Century's Episode: R, Super Robot Wars' action counterpart.

The animated series Gundam Build Fighters has one of the participants in the Gunpla Battle Championships, Mao Yasaka, fielding a version of the Crossbones called the XM-X9999 Crossbone Gundam Maoh. The sequel series, Gundam Build Fighters Try, features another variant, the XM-X1 Crossbone Gundam Full Cloth, used by Lucas Nemesis.

In a 2016 poll by AnimeAnime.jp, Crossbone Gundam was voted as the most-wanted anime adaptation over any other unadapted manga.

Preceded by None	Gundam metaseries (production order); 1994–2023	Succeeded by None
Preceded by Mobile Suit Gundam F91	Gundam Universal Century timeline U.C. 0103, 0133, 0136, 0153, 0169	Succeeded by Mobile Suit Victory Gundam
