= Gundam episodes =

Gundam episodes may refer to episodes of various Gundam series:

== Television episode lists ==
- List of Mobile Suit Gundam episodes
- List of Mobile Suit Zeta Gundam episodes
- List of Mobile Suit Gundam ZZ episodes
- List of Mobile Suit Victory Gundam episodes
- List of Mobile Fighter G Gundam episodes
- List of Mobile Suit Gundam Wing episodes
- List of After War Gundam X episodes
- List of Turn A Gundam episodes
- List of Mobile Suit Gundam SEED episodes
- List of Mobile Suit Gundam 00 episodes
- List of Mobile Suit Gundam Unicorn episodes
- List of Mobile Suit Gundam AGE episodes
- List of Gundam Build Fighters episodes
- List of Gundam Reconguista in G episodes
- List of Gundam Build Fighters Try episodes
- List of Mobile Suit Gundam: Iron-Blooded Orphans episodes
- List of Gundam Build Divers episodes

== Other episodes ==
- Mobile Suit Gundam Wing: Episode Zero, a Japanese manga miniseries
