= List of Mobile Suit Gundam SEED episodes =

Cover of the first DVD volume by Bandai Visual, featuring Kira Yamato.

The Mobile Suit Gundam SEED anime series is animated by the Japanese anime studio Sunrise and directed by Mitsuo Fukuda. It aired from October 5, 2002, to September 27, 2003, with fifty episodes on TBS. As with other series from the Gundam franchise, Gundam SEED takes place in a parallel timeline, in this case the Cosmic Era, the first to do so. In this era, mankind has developed into two subspecies: Naturals, who are born normally and mainly reside on Earth, and Coordinators, genetically enhanced humans capable of withstanding the rigors of space who inhabit orbital colonies. The story revolves around a young Coordinator Kira Yamato who becomes involved in the war between the two races after a neutral space colony is invaded by the Coordinators.Mobile Suit Gundam SEED was dubbed in English and its first English air date was on April 17, 2004, on the American cable network Cartoon Network as part of its Saturday night Toonami block, and was later moved to its unnamed "Graveyard Shift" block on late Friday evenings/early Saturday mornings in late 2004. It was later broadcast on Canada's YTV starting on September 10, 2004, Australia's Adult Swim starting on December 12, 2005, and the United Kingdom's AnimeCentral starting on January 5, 2008.

Seven themes of music were used for the original version of the series. Its openings were "Invoke" (INVOKE -インヴォーク-, Invōku) by T.M.Revolution from episode one to thirteen, "Moment" by Vivian or Kazuma from fourteen to twenty six, "Believe" from twenty seven to forty, and "Realize" for the rest of the series both by Nami Tamaki. The three ending themes are "Anna ni Issho Datta no ni" (あんなに一緒だったのに; lit. 'Although We Were Always Together') by See-Saw from episodes one to twenty six, "River" by Tatsuya Ishii from twenty seven to thirty nine, and "Find the Way" by Mika Nakashima towards the end. The English TV dub used a 30-second shortened version of "Invoke" as its opening, but used the same endings as the original (albeit with edited visuals). The English DVD dub uses the original openings in their original format. For Japan's HD remaster, Gundam SEED cut the two recap episodes from its original broadcast (14 and 26). FictionJunction's new theme "Distance" replaced all uses of "River" with the exception of episode 40 with "Akatsuki no Kuruma" (暁の車) by FictionJunction.

A sequel called Mobile Suit Gundam SEED Destiny, aired from October 9, 2004 to October 1, 2005, also with fifty episodes. Both SEED and SEED Destiny have special editions which are condensed versions of the series that include additional footage. Mobile Suit Gundam SEED C.E. 73: Stargazer, which is directed by Susumu Nishizawa, is a three-episode original net animation (ONA). The first episode of the side story was first streamed on the internet on July 14, 2006, but it premiered a week earlier on July 7, 2006, at Tokyo Anime Center's Akiba 3D Theater.

== Episode list ==
=== Mobile Suit Gundam SEED ===
The series is compiled onto thirteen DVDs in Japan and ten DVDs in English-speaking countries. A five-minute epilogue was included on the final DVD of the Japanese and European release, but it was not included on the North American and Australian release. A series of HD remasters was released in 2012.

Phase #	Title	Directed by	Written by	Original release date	English air date
1	"False Peace"; Transliteration: "Itsuwari no Heiwa" (Japanese: 偽りの平和)	Takeshi Yoshimoto	Chiaki Morosawa	October 5, 2002	April 17, 2004
The Orb Union space colony, Heliopolis, is attacked by ZAFT, despite its neutrality since the beginning of the Bloody Valentine War. Kira Yamato accidentally sees the Earth Alliance's new prototype mobile suits, which have been secretly constructed at Heliopolis' Morgenroete factory. He encounters his childhood friend, Athrun Zala, now a ZAFT soldier, among the raiders.
2	"Its Name: Gundam"; Transliteration: "Sono Na wa Gandamu" (Japanese: その名はガンダム)	Yasuhiro Minami	Chiaki Morosawa	October 12, 2002	April 24, 2004
ZAFT was able to steal four of the five G-Project prototype mobile suits, leaving only the GAT-X105 Strike Gundam. With Murrue Ramius unable to pilot it effectively, Kira pilots the Strike and defends Heliopolis against the invading ZAFT forces to protect his friends. Ensign Natarle Badgiruel takes command of the new mobile assault ship LCAM-01XA Archangel with the surviving crew members.
3	"Collapsing Land"; Transliteration: "Hōkai no Daichi" (Japanese: 崩壊の大地)	Kōichi Takada	Hiroyuki Yoshino	October 19, 2002	May 1, 2004
Lt. Murrue Ramius takes over as captain of the Archangel and Kira and his friends are detained for seeing top secret military weapons while the crew of the Archangel learns that Kira is a Coordinator. ZAFT team leader Rau Le Creuset is determined to capture the Strike after seeing how well it moved and sends out mobile suits to retrieve it. Disobeying orders, Athrun also dispatches so he could confirm if Kira is the one piloting the Strike, but when he finds his answer, Heliopolis crumbles as it sustains too much damage from the conflict within
4	"Silent Run"; Transliteration: "Sairento Ran" (Japanese: サイレントラン)	Naoki Hishikawa	Akinori Endō	October 26, 2002	May 8, 2004
Kira discovers a malfunctioning lifeboat and brings it aboard the Archangel. Everyone is surprised to find Flay Allster among the rescued civilians. The Archangel decides to head for the Eurasian Federation military satellite Artemis to seek help. Le Creuset follows and plans an attack on the Archangel. Kira decides to continue piloting the Strike, and his friends volunteer to join the Archangel crew as his support.
5	"Phase Shift Down"; Transliteration: "Feizu Shifuto Daun" (Japanese: フェイズシフトダウン)	Takeshi Yoshimoto	Kyōko Kogure; Chiaki Morosawa	November 2, 2002	May 15, 2004
Mu La Flaga and Kira launch a counteroffensive against the ZAFT ship Vesalius. The Aile Strike's Phase Shift Armor runs out of power in the middle of the battle, and Athrun, in his GAT-X303 Aegis Gundam, uses this moment to grab the Aile Strike so he can take Kira with him, but Kira frees himself with Mu's help.
6	"The Vanishing Gundam"; Transliteration: "Kieru Gandamu" (Japanese: 消えるガンダム)	Yasuhiro Minami	Akinori Endō; Chiaki Morosawa	November 9, 2002	May 22, 2004
The Archangel and its crew are held captive by the Artemis forces. Nicol Amalfi, in his GAT-X207 Blitz Gundam, attacks Artemis, using its Mirage Colloid stealth system to remain effectively invisible, and destroys the infamous "Umbrella of Artemis", which shields the asteroid fortress. During the attack, the Archangel was able to escape.
7	"The Scar of Space"; Transliteration: "Uchū no Kizuato" (Japanese: 宇宙の傷跡)	Katsuyoshi Yatabe	Hiroyuki Yoshino	November 16, 2002	May 29, 2004
The Archangel forages for water in the Debris Belt. They are shocked to find themselves in the ruins of Junius Seven, destroyed a year earlier and whose destruction sparked the war, so the crew decides to hold a memorial service. As they are excavating ice found around the ruin, a ZAFT mobile suit attacks, but Kira dispatches it. Kira finds a floating lifepod and takes it aboard.
8	"The Songstress of The Enemy Forces"; Transliteration: "Tekigun no Utahime" (Japanese: 敵軍の歌姫)	Teruo Satō	Chiaki Morosawa	November 23, 2002	June 5, 2004
Lacus Clyne, the daughter of PLANT Supreme Council Chairman Siegel Clyne, is found within the lifepod. Her presence causes tension within the crew, but when they receive a message from the 8th Earth Alliance Space Fleet that they are being searched and rescued, they are overjoyed.
9	"The Fading Light"; Transliteration: "Kieteiku Hikari" (Japanese: 消えていく光)	Masato Miyoshi	Kyōko Kogure	November 30, 2002	June 12, 2004
The Archangel's escort to meet with the 8th Space Fleet is attacked by the Le Creuset Team. Flay witnesses the death of her father when Kira fails to protect the escort ships. In desperation, the Archangel reveals Lacus is on board the ship, causing the attackers to withdraw.
10	"Crossroads"; Transliteration: "Wakatareta Michi" (Japanese: 分かたれた道)	Akihiko Nishiyama	Akemi Omode; Chiaki Morosawa	December 7, 2002	June 19, 2004
With everything that has happened, Kira becomes depressed. He is comforted by Lacus, who is strolling around the ship without permission. Kira returns Lacus to Athrun against orders, but refuses Athrun's invitation to change sides.
11	"The Awakening Sword"; Transliteration: "Mezameru Yaiba" (Japanese: 目覚める刃)	Kōichi Takada	Hiroshi Ōnogi	December 14, 2002	June 26, 2004
Le Creuset launches an attack on the Archangel. Kira's desire to protect his friends awakens an unknown, almost berserker ability—the SEED Mode. He single-handedly defeats the attacking Blitz, GAT-X103 Buster Gundam, and GAT-X102 Duel Gundam.
12	"Flay's Decision"; Transliteration: "Furei no Sentaku" (Japanese: フレイの選択)	Akira Toba	Akemi Omode; Chiaki Morosawa	December 21, 2002	July 3, 2004
Kira and his friends are permitted to leave the Archangel, but after overcoming the initial shock of her father's death, Flay decides to enlist in the Earth Alliance Forces, prompting Sai Argyle, Kuzzey Buskirk, Miriallia Haw, and Tolle Koenig to do the same. Kira stays on board the Archangel as well to continue protecting his friends. The Duel is upgraded with the Assault Shroud armor.
13	"Stars Falling in Space"; Transliteration: "Sora ni Furu Hoshi" (Japanese: 宇宙に降る星)	Teruo Satō	Hiroyuki Yoshino	December 28, 2002	July 10, 2004
Le Creuset attacks once again as the Archangel and the 8th Space Fleet approaches Earth. The Archangel was able to descend to Earth, but not without the unfortunate loss of the entire fleet. Yzak Joule, the pilot of the Duel Assault Shroud, vents his frustration against the Aile Strike by destroying a spaceplane carrying Heliopolis refugees that Kira had rescued previously, thinking that it contains fleeing soldiers.
14	"Within Endless Time"; Transliteration: "Hateshinaki Toki no Naka de" (Japanese: 果てし無き時の中で)	Katsuyoshi Yatabe	Hiroyuki Yoshino; Chiaki Morosawa	January 4, 2003	July 17, 2004
Rau Le Creuset reflects on the events that took place in episodes one to thirteen and the Coordinator's history starting from the birth of the first Coordinator, George Glenn. Note: Omitted in the HD Remaster, making "The Respective Solitudes" episode 14; Le Creuset's speech is included before the beginning of "The Respective Solitudes".
15	"The Respective Solitudes"; Transliteration: "Sorezore no Kodoku" (Japanese: それぞれの孤独)	Katsuyoshi Yatabe	Chiaki Morosawa	January 11, 2003	July 24, 2004
The Archangel is forced to alter its descent trajectory as they enter the Earth's atmosphere to save Kira and the Aile Strike. As a result, they land in ZAFT-controlled territory in the Sahara in northern Africa, far from their intended target Alaska. Flay begins to take care of Kira and comforts him when he is tormented by memories of the spaceplane destroyed in the previous battle.
16	"Burning Clouds of Sand"; Transliteration: "Moeru Sajin" (Japanese: 燃える砂塵)	Masato Miyoshi	Shigeru Morita	January 18, 2003	July 31, 2004
The Archangel is attacked by multiple TMF/A-802 BuCUE units which dominate the desert terrain. After having sex with Flay, Kira hastily takes off in the Launcher Strike and fights the ZAFT forces, but he is unfamiliar with Earth's gravity and the desert environment. His ability to quickly adapt amazes ZAFT commander Andrew Waltfeld, also known as the Desert Tiger. When the Launcher Strike is about to run out of power, a resistance group comes to his aid and lures the remaining BuCUE units into an explosive trap.
17	"Cagalli Returns"; Transliteration: "Kagari Futatabi" (Japanese: カガリ再び)	Akihiko Nishiyama	Akemi Omode; Chiaki Morosawa	January 25, 2003	August 7, 2004
Murrue Ramius thanks the resistance group for their help and agrees to be allies. The resistance group introduces themselves as the Desert Dawn, who are fighting Andrew and the Lesseps. Kira once again meets with Cagalli Yula Athha, the mysterious young woman he first encountered at Heliopolis' Morgenroete factory, who is now part of Desert Dawn. Meanwhile, Andrew attacks the Desert Dawn's hometown, but evacuates the town first.
18	"Payback"; Transliteration: "Peibakku" (Japanese: ペイ バック)	Akira Toba	Hiroshi Ōnogi	February 1, 2003	August 14, 2004
Though the Desert Tiger has spared the lives of civilians, Desert Dawn members brashly challenge the ZAFT forces because of the devastation they caused. While the attack fails, most are saved by Kira in the Strike.
19	"Fangs of the Enemy"; Transliteration: "Shukuteki no Kiba" (Japanese: 宿敵の牙)	Kōichi Takada	Hiroyuki Yoshino	February 8, 2003	August 21, 2004
Kira and Cagalli are sent into a nearby ZAFT-controlled city to gather supplies with Natarle and the Desert Dawn. The two teenagers are caught in an attack by the Blue Cosmos, a radical anti-Coordinator organization, and when Kira saves a man who turns out to be Andrew Waltfeld, they are invited to the ZAFT base. There, Andrew reveals that he knows Kira is the pilot of the Strike and a Coordinator, but lets them leave safely.
20	"On a Calm Day"; Transliteration: "Odayakana Hi ni" (Japanese: 穏やかな日に)	Osamu Sekita	Chiaki Morosawa	February 15, 2003	August 28, 2004
Athrun and Nicol are given the day off; Athrun spends the day with Lacus, and they talk about Kira, whom the latter has taken a liking to. The PLANT Supreme Council debates on whether the attack codenamed "Operation Spitbreak" should be put into action.
21	"Beyond the Clouds of Sand"; Transliteration: "Sajin no Hate" (Japanese: 砂塵の果て)	Masato Miyoshi	Shigeru Morita	February 22, 2003	September 4, 2004
A battle between the Lesseps and the Desert Dawn commences. Kira and the Desert Tiger fight a battle that reveals the pain of facing an enemy who is not an abstraction. With the Aile Strike's power almost depleted, Kira has no choice but to destroy Andrew's TMF/A-803 LaGOWE or die himself.
22	"The Sea Dyed Red"; Transliteration: "Kurenai ni Somaru Umi" (Japanese: 紅に染まる海)	Akihiko Nishiyama	Hiroshi Ōnogi	March 1, 2003	September 11, 2004
The Archangel crew crosses the Red Sea to head towards the neutral Orb Union with Cagalli and Ledonir Kisaka on board. With the previous battle weighing heavily on him, Kira talks to Cagalli about his reasons for fighting, making Flay jealous. They are attacked by ZAFT's air and underwater-type mobile suits, but Kira and Mu take them out.
23	"Fateful Encounter"; Transliteration: "Unmei no Deai" (Japanese: 運命の出会い)	Katsuyoshi Yatabe	Yūichi Nomura; Chiaki Morosawa	March 8, 2003	September 18, 2004
A battle with ZAFT aquatic forces led by Commander Marco Morassim prevents Kira from fighting alongside Mu and Cagalli in their FX-550 Skygrasper units. Cagalli's Skygrasper sustains damage and is forced to turn back, but she encounters Athrun's transport plane; her Skygrasper is shot down, but not before shooting down his transport plane, forcing Athrun in his Aegis to eject from the transport plane. By chance, they are both stranded on the same deserted island.
24	"War for Two"; Transliteration: "Futaridake no Sensō" (Japanese: 二人だけの戦争)	Akira Toba	Kyōko Kogure; Chiaki Morosawa	March 15, 2003	October 2, 2004
Cagalli is surprised to find Athrun on the same deserted island. She attacks him, but she is overpowered and captured. When everything settles down, the two discuss the war and the reason why they are fighting. At sunrise, they are rescued by their respective comrades.
25	"The Land of Peace"; Transliteration: "Heiwa no Kuni e" (Japanese: 平和の国へ)	Kōichi Takada	Hiroyuki Yoshino	March 22, 2003	October 9, 2004
The Archangel is attacked by the Zala Team, now consisting of the Le Creuset Team members. They take heavy damage, but when they enter the waters of the neutral nation of Orb, ZAFT is chased away and is told that the Archangel is not at Orb. The Zala Team sneaks into Orb, believing their official statement is false.
26	"Moment"; Transliteration: "Mōmento" (Japanese: モーメント)	Mitsuo Fukuda	Shigeru Morita; Chiaki Morosawa	March 29, 2003	October 16, 2004
A recap of the first 25 episodes. Narrated by Takanori Nishikawa, Miguel Aiman's voice actor (in the English version, it is narrated by Tony Sampson, Miguel's English voice actor). Note: Omitted in the HD Remaster, making "Endless Rondo" episode 25.
27	"Endless Rondo"; Transliteration: "Hatenaki Rondo" (Japanese: 果てなき輪舞)	Katsuyoshi Yatabe	Shigeru Morita; Chiaki Morosawa	April 12, 2003	October 23, 2004
Senior Engineer Erica Simmons of Morgenroete reviews the Strike's combat logs and theorizes that Kira might be superior to any other Coordinator and speculates on the "SEED factor" theory. She shows Kira the mobile suits Orb is developing and asks him to develop a mobile suit operating system that can be easily used by Naturals.
28	"Kira"; Transliteration: "Kira" (Japanese: キラ)	Osamu Sekita	Chiaki Morosawa	April 19, 2003	October 30, 2004
Kira and his friends are given the chance to meet with their parents, who have taken refuge in Orb. Kira refuses to go, but his parents meet with Orb Chief Representative Uzumi Nara Athha, who hints at a deeper connection between Kira and Cagalli than they might realize. Kira instead completes the OS for Orb's MBF-M1 Astray mobile suits. When Kira's mechanical bird flies off, Kira finds himself standing face to face with Athrun. They part ways, pretending not to know each other, but not without exchanging kind words.
29	"The Turning Point"; Transliteration: "Sadame no Kusabi" (Japanese: さだめの楔)	Masato Miyoshi	Shigeru Morita	April 26, 2003	November 6, 2004
The Archangel, without Cagalli and Ledonir on board, leaves Orb territory for Alaska. The Zala Team, who are patiently waiting on the outskirts of Orb, engages them in a battle. Kira grounds the Duel Assault Shroud, Buster, and Blitz with the help of Mu and Tolle, who is now the second Skygrasper pilot. As Kira in the Sword Strike and Athrun in the Aegis fight, Nicol in his damaged Blitz intervenes, but he steps into Kira's attack, getting himself killed in the process. (NOTE: in the HD Remastered version, Kira tries to move the Sword Strike's "Schwert Gewehr" anti-ship sword away from the approaching Blitz instead of swinging it towards the Blitz; Kira fails, and the Blitz is still struck).
30	"Flashing Blades"; Transliteration: "Senkō no Toki" (Japanese: 閃光の時)	Akira Toba	Yūichi Nomura; Chiaki Morosawa	May 3, 2003	November 13, 2004
The Zala Team makes another effort to destroy the Archangel and the Strike. Dearka, in the Buster, is shot down by Mu in the Launcher Grasper and surrenders as the Archangel locks onto him. Tolle, in the other Skygrasper, attempts to aid Kira, but Athrun kills him. The grief Kira and Athrun suffer over their friends' deaths is enough for them to activate their SEED modes and try to kill each other. The Aegis grasps the Strike, and Athrun self-destructs his Gundam to try to end his best friend.
31	"Grieving Skies"; Transliteration: "Dōkoku no Sora" (Japanese: 慟哭の空)	Akihiko Nishiyama	Hiroshi Ōnogi; Chiaki Morosawa	May 10, 2003	November 20, 2004
The crew of the Archangel grieves for the apparent deaths of Kira and Tolle. Cagalli searches the wreckage for Kira at Onogoro Island, but instead finds Athrun and confronts him for killing Kira. Kira awakens and finds himself in the care of Lacus on PLANT.
32	"In the Promised Land"; Transliteration: "Yakusoku no Chi ni" (Japanese: 約束の地に)	Kōichi Takada	Kyōko Kogure; Chiaki Morosawa	May 17, 2003	November 27, 2004
The Archangel finally arrives in JOSH-A in Alaska. A grief-stricken Miriallia attacks Dearka, now a prisoner on board the Archangel, but ends up saving his life when Flay tries to shoot him.
33	"Gathering Darkness"; Transliteration: "Yami no Taidō" (Japanese: 闇の胎動)	Osamu Sekita	Shigeru Morita; Chiaki Morosawa	May 24, 2003	December 4, 2004
The crew of the Archangel find themselves questioned for their actions regarding their escape from Heliopolis, the fall of the 8th Space Fleet, and entrusting the Strike Gundam to Kira Yamato. Meanwhile, Lacus comforts Kira, who questions his right to live, especially after trying to kill Athrun.
34	"Seen and Unseen"; Transliteration: "Manazashi no Saki" (Japanese: まなざしの先)	Shintarō Inokawa	Yūichi Nomura; Chiaki Morosawa	May 31, 2003	December 11, 2004
Flay, Mu, and Natarle are to be transferred off the Archangel. Mu suspects that something is not quite right as the Alaskan JOSH-A base is evacuated, and he was right as he stumbled into the data of the Cyclops System superweapon constructed underneath JOSH-A. Rau manages to infiltrate JOSH-A and kidnaps Flay. When Kira hears news of Operation Spitbreak, Lacus and her father Siegel Clyne entrust Kira with the ZGMF-X10A Freedom Gundam, equipped with the new Neutron Jammer Canceller technology, giving the mobile suit unlimited energy.
35	"The Descending Sword"; Transliteration: "Mai Oriru Tsurugi" (Japanese: 舞い降りる剣)	Katsuyoshi Yatabe	Hiroyuki Yoshino; Chiaki Morosawa	June 7, 2003	December 18, 2004
Operation Spitbreak is initiated, with both ZAFT and the Earth Alliance believing they have outsmarted the other. The Archangel is left behind to be destroyed in a calculated plan that would decimate everyone on the battlefield, until Kira in the Freedom arrives to save them. A stunned Archangel crew is surprised to learn that Kira is still alive, but then informs him of the Cyclops System trap. Kira then immediately heads to warn everyone of the impending danger and call for ceasefire, but it was too late. The Cyclops System activates, decimates 80% of the attacking ZAFT forces, destroys JOSH-A, but Kira and the Archangel successfully escape the blast zone.
36	"In the Name of Justice"; Transliteration: "Seigi no Na no Moto ni" (Japanese: 正義の名のもとに)	Masato Miyoshi	Hiroyuki Yoshino; Chiaki Morosawa	June 14, 2003	January 7, 2005
Lacus, now denounced a traitor to the PLANTs for handing the Freedom over to an unknown pilot, confronts Athrun and challenges him to decide what he truly is fighting for. Athrun is ordered by his father, Patrick Zala, which is also the PLANT Supreme Council Chairman, to pilot the Freedom's sister unit ZGMF-X09A Justice Gundam to seek and recapture or destroy the stolen Freedom.
37	"Divine Thunder"; Transliteration: "Kami no Ikazuchi" (Japanese: 神のいかずち)	Akira Toba	Hiroshi Ōnogi; Chiaki Morosawa	June 21, 2003	January 14, 2005
Kira and the Archangel make their way to Orb, where Lord Uzumi welcomes them and asks that they decide for themselves why they are fighting. Earth Alliance's Panama mass driver is destroyed by the remaining ZAFT forces in retaliation for their defeat in Alaska. Meanwhile, Erica Simmons presents a reconstructed Strike for the Archangel's use.
38	"Decisive Fire"; Transliteration: "Ketsui no Hōka" (Japanese: 決意の砲火)	Akihiko Nishiyama	Hiroyuki Yoshino; Chiaki Morosawa	June 28, 2003	January 21, 2005
To get a hold of Orb's Kaguya mass driver, the Earth Alliance demands that Orb concede to them or be attacked for siding with ZAFT. Murrue decides that the Archangel will support Orb, and that its crew members will be discharged if they no longer wish to fight. Murrue also starts a romantic relationship with Mu. On the day of the battle, Muruta Azrael, leader of Blue Cosmos, attacks Orb with three new mobile suits, the GAT-X252 Forbidden Gundam, GAT-X370 Raider Gundam, and GAT-X131 Calamity Gundam. When Kira in the Freedom starts to get outmaneuvered by the new machines, Athrun in the Justice arrives to back him up.
39	"Athrun"; Transliteration: "Asuran" (Japanese: アスラン)	Kōichi Takada	Yūichi Nomura; Chiaki Morosawa	July 5, 2003	January 28, 2005
Athrun assists Kira in dealing with the Forbidden, Raider, and Calamity. As the fight continues, the three Earth Alliance pilots argue with one another, but they are interrupted when they are struck by intense pain from their medication wearing off. Muruta is forced to retreat and regroup, and recalls the three Alliance Gundams. During the ceasefire, the two friends reunite, and Athrun must decide whether he should continue obeying his father's orders or fight for what he believes in.
40	"Into the Dawn Skies"; Transliteration: "Akatsuki no Sora e" (Japanese: 暁の宇宙へ)	Osamu Sekita	Hiroshi Ōnogi; Chiaki Morosawa	July 12, 2003	February 4, 2005
The Earth Alliance attacks again, but the results are the same as the previous battle. The Archangel and the Orb ship Kusanagi launch into space, while the leaders of Orb stay behind. They blow up the Kaguya mass driver and armament factories, sacrificing their own lives in the process.
41	"Trembling World"; Transliteration: "Yureru Sekai" (Japanese: ゆれる世界)	Katsuyoshi Yatabe	Hiroshi Ōnogi; Chiaki Morosawa	July 19, 2003	February 11, 2005
Cagalli, though grief-stricken with her father's death, confronts Kira with a mysterious photograph given to her by Lord Uzumi, of a woman with two infants and Kira and Cagalli's names written on the back, implying that she and Kira are twin siblings. On a PLANT, Lacus is still on the run for treason, but broadcasts messages to counter PLANT Supreme Council Chairman Patrick Zala's propaganda. She soon discovers that Patrick Zala's forces have managed to locate and assassinate her father Siegel Clyne. Meanwhile, Muruta makes preparations to head into space with the intent to capture the Freedom or the Justice, suspecting they hold a valuable secret, just as the former CCO of the Archangel Natarle Badgiruel is given a new assignment—captain of the Archangel's sister ship, the Dominion.
42	"Lacus Strikes"; Transliteration: "Rakusu Shutsugeki" (Japanese: ラクス出撃)	Shintarō Inokawa	Hiroyuki Yoshino; Chiaki Morosawa	July 26, 2003	February 18, 2005
In an effort to discover his father's true intentions, Athrun leaves the Justice on the Archangel and returns to the PLANTs on a shuttle to speak to Patrick, but he is shot and arrested. Lacus and (the presumed killed in action) Andrew Waltfeld join forces, stealing the ZAFT support ship Eternal and rescuing Athrun. They join forces with the Archangel and the Kusanagi at the Mendel colony, thus forming the Three Ships Alliance.
43	"What Stands in the Way"; Transliteration: "Tachihadakaru Mono" (Japanese: 立ちはだかるもの)	Masato Miyoshi	Shigeru Morita; Chiaki Morosawa	August 2, 2003	February 25, 2005
The newly formed Three Ships Alliance takes shelter at the abandoned Mendel colony. Unfortunately, they are tracked down by both ZAFT and Earth Alliance forces. Rau Le Creuset commands the ZAFT fleet, and Natarle Badgiruel commands the Earth Alliance assault ship Dominion. Dominion takes the initiative and attacks, aiming to capture either the Freedom or the Justice.
44	"Spiral of Encounters"; Transliteration: "Rasen no Kaikō" (Japanese: 螺旋の邂逅)	Akira Toba	Hiroyuki Yoshino; Chiaki Morosawa	August 9, 2003	March 4, 2005
The Dominion retreats so their pilots can get their medicine. Mu in the Launcher Strike senses Rau's presence and heads inside the Mendel colony, with Dearka in the Buster backing him up. Yzak in the Duel is surprised to see his comrade alive, but Kira in the Freedom arrives and immediately cripples Rau's ZGMF-600 GuAIZ. Kira follows Mu inside the Mendel laboratory, and both are shocked to discover Rau has a few secrets to reveal.
45	"The Opening Door"; Transliteration: "Hiraku Tobira" (Japanese: 開く扉)	Akihiko Nishiyama	Chiaki Morosawa	August 16, 2003	March 11, 2005
Kira and Mu face terrifying revelations in an encounter with Rau. Dearka and Yzak have their own meeting where they question what they are truly fighting against. Meanwhile, the Dominion attacks once again. Rau returns to the Vesalius and sends Flay out during the battle.
46	"A Place for the Soul"; Transliteration: "Tamashii no Basho" (Japanese: たましいの場所)	Kōichi Takada	Chiaki Morosawa	August 30, 2003	March 18, 2005
Flay, who was held captive by Rau, is put into a lifepod and given a disk containing the data for the Neutron Jammer Canceller. Flay manages to get through to the Dominion and the Archangel, Kira also hears this and rushes to save her, but leaves himself unguarded, and the Freedom is shot in the head. Athrun rescues the Freedom and brings it back to the Archangel. Meanwhile, the Dominion saves Flay, allowing Muruta Azrael to succeed in his original objective. Back at the Eternal, Kira falls unconscious, and when he awakes, his friends and Lacus comfort him while he releases all his mental stress.
47	"The Nightmare Reborn"; Transliteration: "Akumu wa Futatabi" (Japanese: 悪夢は再び)	Osamu Sekita	Hiroyuki Yoshino; Chiaki Morosawa	September 6, 2003	March 25, 2005
Two months after the Battle of Mendel, the Earth Alliance forces, now equipped with Neutron Jammer Cancellers, launch an all-out attack on the PLANTs. ZAFT's Boaz military asteroid is destroyed by a barrage of nuclear missiles, with the Earth Alliance's next target being the PLANTs, the Coordinator homeland. The Freedom and the Justice, with their METEOR support systems, arrive at the battlefield in time to destroy all the nuclear warheads. In retaliation, Patrick Zala orders to fire the newly-deployed GENESIS superweapon.
48	"Day of Wrath"; Transliteration: "Ikari no Hi" (Japanese: 怒りの日)	Katsuyoshi Yatabe	Hiroyuki Yoshino; Chiaki Morosawa	September 13, 2003	April 1, 2005
The GENESIS, a gigantic gamma-ray laser superweapon, wipes out half of Earth Alliance's forces. The Alliance forces are forced to withdraw temporarily to regroup as Zala prepares GENESIS to fire a second shot at EA's lunar base at the Ptolemaeus crater. During the intermission, each of the couples on board the Archangel, Kusanagi, and Eternal – Kira and Lacus, Athrun and Cagalli, and Murrue and Mu – pray for each other's safety in the upcoming battle.
49	"The Final Light"; Transliteration: "Shūmatsu no Hikari" (Japanese: 終末の光)	Akira Toba	Hiroyuki Yoshino; Chiaki Morosawa	September 20, 2003	April 8, 2005
GENESIS' second shot decimates half of the Earth Alliance's lunar reinforcements and destroys their Ptolemaeus lunar base. The Three Ships Alliance saves the PLANTs from the second wave of nukes. Mu fights Rau in his new ZGMF-X13A Providence Gundam with the powerful remote DRAGOON system while Kira and Athrun fight the Forbidden, Raider, and Calamity. The Alliance's final attack on the PLANTs fails. On the Dominion, Muruta orders the crew to fire at the Archangel, which has stopped to recover a wounded Mu and the damaged Strike. Flay attempts to warn the Archangel, prompting Muruta to physically attack her and attempt to shoot her. Natarle attempts to stop Muruta and struggles with him over his gun. She tells the crew to abandon ship. In the struggle with Muruta, she is shot several times, but locks the bridge to prevent Muruta from escaping. Muruta fires the "Lohengrin" positron blaster cannon on the Archangel, but Mu sacrifices the Strike to protect the ship. In response, the grief-stricken and enraged Murrue orders the Archangel to destroy the Dominion with its own "Lohengrin", killing Muruta and Natarle.
50	"To a Future that Never Ends"; Transliteration: "Owaranai Asu e" (Japanese: 終わらない明日へ)	Masato Miyoshi	Chiaki Morosawa	September 27, 2003	April 15, 2005
The Archangel, the Eternal, and the Kusanagi plunge into the battle, trying to keep both sides from using their weapons of mass destruction. Rau destroys Flay's escape shuttle, killing everyone on board. Flay's spirit visits the grief-stricken Kira to apologize and thank him. As Patrick prepares the GENESIS to fire its third shot on the Atlantic Federation's capital, Washington, D.C., which will eliminate half of all life on Earth, an officer guns him down after he decides to sacrifice even his own troops even if the war is technically in favor of ZAFT, Kira destroys the Providence with the Freedom, while Athrun remote-destructs the Justice to destroy GENESIS from the inside. With both ZAFT and the Earth Alliance forces in disarray, the renegade moderate faction of the PLANTs seizes the opportunity to call for a ceasefire, effectively ending the war.
51	"After Phase – Between the Stars"; Transliteration: "Hoshi no Hazama de" (Japanese: 星のはざまで)	Masahiro Takada	N/A	March 26, 2004	-
The fighting has ceased, but peace talks between the PLANTs and the Earth Alliance continue. At Reverend Malchio's orphanage in the Marshall Islands, Kira, Athrun, Lacus, and Cagalli reflect on the past and discuss the future.

==== Mobile Suit Gundam SEED: Special Edition ====
Mobile Suit Gundam SEED: Special Edition, also known as Mobile Suit Gundam SEED: Movie, summarizes the fifty episode television series in three 95 minute episodes – much like the compilation movies for the original series, Zeta Gundam, and Turn A Gundam. The episodes contain a compilation of scenes from the television series and an additional twenty minutes of new footage. Only the first two episodes were broadcast in Japan, each episode split into two 55-minute parts. The Special Editions is available in Japan and North America on three DVDs or three PlayStation Portable UMDs.

Phase #	Title	Original release date
Special–I	"The Empty Battlefield"; Transliteration: "Kokū no Senjō" (Japanese: 虚空の戦場)	March 23, 2004
Covers the events of Gundam SEED Phases 1 to 20.
Special–II	"The Far-Away Dawn"; Transliteration: "Harukanaru Akatsuki" (Japanese: 遥かなる暁)	July 28, 2004
Covers the events of Gundam SEED Phases 21 to 40.
Special–III	"The Rumbling Sky"; Transliteration: "Meidō no Sora" (Japanese: 鳴動の宇宙)	October 22, 2004
Covers the events of Gundam SEED Phases 41 to 50.

=== Mobile Suit Gundam SEED C.E. 73 Stargazer ===
Mobile Suit Gundam SEED C.E. 73 Stargazer is a three episode original net animation (ONA) side story that takes place during the timeline of Gundam SEED Destiny. Unlike the other series set in the Cosmic Era, C.E. 73 Stargazer is directed by Susumu Nishizawa and features a new cast of characters. The episodes were not broadcast on television, but streamed through the Bandai Channel and sold on one DVD in Japan. The first episode was released on the Bandai Channel on July 14, 2006, but it premiered a week earlier at the Tokyo Anime Center's Akiba 3D Theater on July 7, 2006. It uses one piece of music. The ending theme is "Stargazer ~Hoshi no Tobira~" (STARGAZER 〜星の扉〜; lit. 'Stargazer ~Star's Door~') by Satori Negishi.

No.	Title	Original release date
1	"Stage 01"	July 14, 2006
The world is thrown into chaos after the Break the World incident during the Second Bloody Valentine War. A ZGMF-1017 GINN attacks a city where DSSD members Selene McGriff and Edmond Du Clos are in and causes massive damage until it is stopped by a linear tank commanded by Edmond, who is mortally wounded in his attack. They will discover that the GINN was piloted by a little group of kids (it was not clear if they died in the final attack) who wanted revenge. Meanwhile Selene and another DSSD member, Sol Ryuune L'ange, leave for space while Phantom Pain deploys its pilots to fight ZAFT mobile suits that attack an Earth Alliance base.
2	"Stage 02"	August 21, 2006
Sven Cal Bayan and his team are sent to eliminate a Coordinator refugee camp suspected of harboring terrorists. Sven has flashbacks of his military training and conditioning when he was a child. Sven with his GAT-X105E Strike Noir Gundam proceeds to massacre the camp without hesitation. In another battle, while defending the Earth Alliance Forces ground carrier, Bonaparte, Mudie Holcroft is killed and her GAT-X1022 Blu Duel Gundam is destroyed while fighting ZAFT forces. Meanwhile in space, Selene tests the new AI-piloted GSX-401FW Stargazer Gundam with its "Voiture Lumiere" propulsion system.
3	"Stage 03"	September 29, 2006
Phantom Pain attacks the DSSD station to steal the AI data of the Stargazer. The brutal assault leaves many DSSD members and the Verde Buster pilot, Shams Couza, dead. To counter the attack, Selene and Sol launch in the Stargazer and use its unique features to destroy several enemy mobile suits. Lost in space, Selene captures the Strike Noir and uses the Stargazer's propulsion system to catapult themselves near Venus. Sven and Selene meet face to face and start their long journey home. Selene administers a drug on both of them to increase the oxygen absorption inside their blood and they slowly enter coma state. They must be found within 27 days or they will die from lack of oxygen, but Sol finds the Stargazer 27 days and 21 hours later.
