= List of Mobile Suit Gundam: Iron-Blooded Orphans episodes =

Cover of the first Blu-ray volume release by Bandai Visual.

Mobile Suit Gundam: Iron-Blooded Orphans (Japanese: 機動戦士ガンダム 鉄血のオルフェンズ, Hepburn: Kidō Senshi Gandamu: Tekketsu no Orufenzu), also referred to as G-Tekketsu (Gの鉄血), is a 2015 Japanese mecha drama anime television series and the fourteenth incarnation to Sunrise's long-running Gundam franchise. It is directed by Tatsuyuki Nagai and written by Mari Okada, a team which previously collaborated on Toradora! and Anohana: The Flower We Saw That Day. It aired in Japan on MBS and other JNN stations on October 4, 2015, making this the first Gundam series to return to a Sunday late afternoon time slot since Mobile Suit Gundam AGE. On American television, the series began airing on Adult Swim's Toonami programming block on June 5, 2016, making it the first Gundam series to receive a televised broadcast in the United States since Syfy's airing of Mobile Suit Gundam 00 in 2008–09.

For episodes 1–13, the series' opening theme song is titled "Raise your flag", performed by Man with a Mission, while the ending theme is "Orphans no Namida" performed by Misia and co-written by Shiro Sagisu. For episodes 14–25, the opening theme is "Survivor" by Blue Encount, while the ending theme is titled "Steel -Tekketsu no Kizuna-" (STEEL-鉄血の絆-; lit. 'Steel -Iron Blooded Bonds-') by True. The ending theme for episode 19 is "Senka no Tomoshibi" (戦火の灯火; lit. 'Lamplight of War') by Yuko Suzuhana. For episodes 27-38, the third opening theme is "Rage of Dust" by Spyair, and the ending theme is "Shōnen no Hate" (少年の果て, lit. "The Ends of a Boy") by Granrodeo. From episode 39-50, the fourth opening is "Fighter" by Kana-Boon, while the ending theme is "Freesia" by Uru.

== Series overview ==
Season	Episodes	Originally released	
Season	Episodes	First released	Last released
1	25	October 4, 2015	March 27, 2016
2	25	October 2, 2016	April 2, 2017

== Episode list ==
=== Season 1 (2015–16) ===
No. overall	No. in season	Title	Directed by	Written by	Storyboarded by	Original release date	English air date
1	1	"Iron and Blood..."; Transliteration: "Tetsu to Chi to" (Japanese: 鉄と血と)	Tatsuyuki Nagai, Naomichi Yamato	Mari Okada	Tatsuyuki Nagai	October 4, 2015	June 5, 2016
In the midst of the ongoing protests by citizens of the Martian colony Chryse demanding independence from the Earth government, the Chryse Guard Security is assigned to protect Princess Kudelia Aina Bernstein on her diplomatic mission. When the CGS headquarters is suddenly attacked by Gjallarhorn forces, the Third Army Division, having just been abandoned by their superiors, strikes back with the ancient and hastily repaired Gundam Barbatos, piloted by Mikazuki Augus.
2	2	"Barbatos"; Transliteration: "Barubatosu" (Japanese: バルバトス)	Naomichi Yamato	Mari Okada	Tatsuyuki Nagai, Naomichi Yamato, Shinya Watada	October 11, 2015	June 12, 2016
The Barbatos successfully repels the Gjallarhorn assault, but CGS suffers heavy casualties in the aftermath. After being severely disciplined by First Corps leader Haeda Gunnel for luring Gjallarhorn's forces toward the retreating First Corps during the battle, Third Corps leader Orga Itsuka proposes to his comrades in the Third Corps to rebel against their elders. Meanwhile, Major Coral Conrad orders First Lieutenant Crank Zent to return to the battlefield to erase any evidence of their defeat before the Gjallarhorn inspectors from Earth find out. Crank reluctantly complies but has qualms over killing child soldiers.
3	3	"Glorious Demise"; Transliteration: "Sange" (Japanese: 散華)	Shinya Watada	Mari Okada	Shinya Watada, Masami Obari	October 18, 2015	June 19, 2016
The Third Corps instigates a mutiny that expels majority of the First Corps from the CGS base. As they try to figure out how to support themselves financially, Crank returns to the base to issue a challenge to the Gundam Barbatos in order to retrieve Kudelia and the Graze captured during Gjallarhorn's previous assault on the base. Meanwhile, Orga renames the Third Corps into Tekkadan. Mikazuki emerges the victor in the duel while a wounded Crank asks him to kill him to avoid bringing shame to his group, to which the child complies by shooting him.
4	4	"The Price of Life"; Transliteration: "Inochi no Nedan" (Japanese: 命の値段)	Shouji Ikeno	Toshizo Nemoto	Yoshikazu Miyao	October 25, 2015	June 26, 2016
Tekkadan plans their route to smuggle Kudelia to Earth without alerting Gjallarhorn forces. Meanwhile, two Gjallarhorn officers, McGillis Fareed and Gaelio Bauduin, arrive on Mars to investigate the recent battles and encounter Mikazuki and Biscuit Griffon on a cornfield.
5	5	"Beyond the Red Sky"; Transliteration: "Akai Sora no Mukō" (Japanese: 赤い空の向こう)	Shigeru Ueda	Hajime Kamoshida	Ken Ōtsuka	November 1, 2015	July 10, 2016 (Note: On the broadcast night of July 2–3, 2016, Adult Swim hosted a Hunter × Hunter marathon where they played episodes 1–7.)
Tekkadan prepare to escort Kudelia to Earth, thanks to the Orcus Company. However, the route is leaked to Coral, and the transport shuttle is ambushed by Gjallarhorn forces.
6	6	"As For Them"; Transliteration: "Karera ni Tsuite" (Japanese: 彼等について)	Seung Hui Son	Michihiro Tsuchiya	Susumu Nishizawa	November 8, 2015	July 17, 2016
With no one to trust after Orcus' betrayal, the Isaribi crew plan to reach out to Teiwaz, a Jupiter-based conglomerate, to guide them to Earth. Meanwhile, Kudelia offers to remedy the illiteracy of Mikazuki and the younger crew members by teaching them to read and write. Frustrated by the loss of his direct superiors, rookie Ein Dalton asks to join McGillis' team to pursue Tekkadan.
7	7	"Whaling"; Transliteration: "Isanatori" (Japanese: いさなとり)	Naomichi Yamato	Hajime Kamoshida	Susumu Nishizawa, Iwao Teraoka	November 15, 2015	July 24, 2016
Tekkadan's former employer, Maruba, threatens them to return the Isaribi, having brought along the Teiwaz transport crew, the Turbines. Refusing his order, Tekkadan battles Teiwaz in Mobile Suit combat, but unbeknownst to them, the Mobile Suit battle is a distraction for several Tekkadan troops led by Orga to infiltrate and hold the Teiwaz members as hostages.
8	8	"The Form of Closeness"; Transliteration: "Yorisō Katachi" (Japanese: 寄り添うかたち)	Shun Kudō	Toshizo Nemoto	Shun Kudō	November 22, 2015	July 31, 2016
The skirmish between Tekkadan and the Turbines comes to an end when Orga and his team raid the Hammerhead and negotiate for Teiwaz to assist them in escorting Kudelia to Earth.
9	9	"Sakazuki" (Japanese: 盃)	Shouji Ikeno	Mari Okada	Yoshimitsu Ohashi	November 29, 2015	August 7, 2016
Tekkadan and the Turbines arrive at Saisei to begin negotiations with McMurdo Barriston, leader of Teiwaz. Later, Tekkadan celebrate their success in one of the vessel's commercial properties to relieve their stresses.
10	10	"A Letter from Tomorrow"; Transliteration: "Ashita Kara no Tegami" (Japanese: 明日からの手紙)	Tomo Ōkubo	Michihiro Tsuchiya	Susumu Nishizawa	December 6, 2015	August 14, 2016
Members of Tekkadan receive video messages from their loved ones back on Mars. Meanwhile, the Isaribi is assigned a liaison from Teiwaz to oversee the vessel's activities during the long journey to Earth.
11	11	"Human Debris"; Transliteration: "Hyūman Deburi" (Japanese: ヒューマン・デブリ)	Shinya Watada	Hajime Kamoshida	Shinya Watada	December 13, 2015	August 21, 2016
The Isaribi and Hammerhead encounter a space pirate group known as the "Brewers", with Takaki being critically injured during the skirmish. Meanwhile, McGillis and Gaelio return to Earth and assess the situation within a Gjallarhorn household.
12	12	"The Shoals"; Transliteration: "Anshō" (Japanese: 暗礁)	Shigeru Ueda	Toshizo Nemoto	Susumu Nishizawa	December 20, 2015	August 28, 2016
Knowing that the Brewers are hot on their trail, the Isaribi and Hammerhead decide to take the initiative and lay a trap for their pursuers while passing by a debris field. In ensuing battle, the two ships successfully incapacitate the enemy while the latter's mobile suits are gradually eliminated. Meanwhile, Akihiro Altland attempts to persuade his brother Masahiro to defect from the enemy side to no avail due to the latter's melancholy and fails to prevent the boy's death in the battle, much to his grief.
13	13	"Funeral Rites"; Transliteration: "Sōsō" (Japanese: 葬送)	Naomichi Yamato	Mari Okada	Yoshiharu Ashino	December 27, 2015	September 11, 2016 (Note: On the broadcast night of September 3–4, 2016, Adult Swim hosted a One-Punch Man Labor Day marathon where they played episodes 1–7.)
With Tekkadan and the Turbines emerging victorious over the Brewers, the survivors deal with their wounds and the deaths of their comrades. Meanwhile, Orga claims the Brewers' remaining mobile suits and one assault ship from Brooke Kabayan at gunpoint. The remaining Human Debris from the Brewers are taken by Tekkadan with assurance they will be taken care of on Mars. To reconcile with their feelings over the death of their comrades, Tekkadan conducts a funeral in memory of those who fell in the battle before proceeding as planned.
14	14	"The Vessel of Hope"; Transliteration: "Kibō o Hakobu Fune" (Japanese: 希望を運ぶ船)	Seung Hui Son	Michihiro Tsuchiya	Hirokazu Hisayuki	January 10, 2016	September 18, 2016
Tekkadan and the Turbines arrive at the Dort Colonies to deliver cargo for an assignment given by a third party company through Teiwaz, only to fall into a trap set by Gjallarhorn as they and Kudelia are framed as insurgents and arms dealers bent on arming disgruntled workers and stoking an uprising. Meanwhile, Fumitan Admoss is torn between her loyalty to Kudelia and to her real employer.
15	15	"The Trail of Footprints"; Transliteration: "Ashiato no Yukue" (Japanese: 足跡のゆくえ)	Shouji Ikeno	Hajime Kamoshida	Iwao Teraoka	January 17, 2016	September 25, 2016
Biscuit reunites with his elder brother Savarin, but he and Atra are quickly nabbed by Gjallarhorn forces while Atra fakes her identity as Kudelia. As Atra is being beaten by her interrogators, Mikazuki, Orga, and the rest of Tekkadan race to rescue them. Meanwhile, Kudelia and Fumitan meet a masked man who reveals the true motives of those backing their trip to the Dort Colonies.
16	16	"Fumitan Admoss"; Transliteration: "Fumitan Adomosu" (Japanese: フミタン・アドモス)	Shun Kudō	Shinsuke Onishi	Yoshimitsu Ohashi	January 24, 2016	October 2, 2016
As the Workers' Union begin their demonstration against the Dort Company, Orga and his team go search for Kudelia, who has run off to get answers from Fumitan. The demonstration becomes deadly when Gjallarhorn forces intervene and Kudelia finds herself involved with the Union.
17	17	"Kudelia's Decision"; Transliteration: "Kūderia no Ketsui" (Japanese: クーデリアの決意)	Tomo Ōkubo	Michihiro Tsuchiya	Susumu Nishizawa	January 31, 2016	October 9, 2016
Following the Dort 3 massacre, the conflict between the Workers' Union and the Dort Company becomes more violent, with workers from the other colonies seizing military equipment and heading toward Dort 3. Unfortunately, the equipment is revealed to be sabotaged by Gjallarhorn and the battle becomes a one sided slaughter while Gjallarhorn invokes a media blackout. Having witnessed the atrocities of Gjallarhorn, Kudelia decides to fight for not only Mars, but the colonies as well. With the help of members of a local news network, Orga and his team re-establish communication with the Isaribi while Mikazuki flies out to space to once again pilot the Gundam Barbatos and engage the Gjallarhorn forces in the conflict. This gives Gaelio the opportunity to launch the Gundam Kimaris, a Gundam-Frame mobile suit from his own ancestry. As the Isaribi faces the might of Gjallarhorn's fleet, Kudelia broadcasts her message to the people.
18	18	"Voice"; Transliteration: "Koe" (Japanese: 声)	Yoshimitsu Ohashi	Toshizo Nemoto, Mari Okada	Hirokazu Hisayuki, Yoshimitsu Ohashi	February 7, 2016	October 16, 2016
Thanks to Kudelia's address to the people, Gjallarhorn forces are forced to stand down at the request of the African Union to avoid a public relations fallout and allow the Isaribi to continue its journey to Earth. Both Tekkadan and the Turbines are paid a visit by the Montag Company, represented by the mysterious masked man Kudelia met a day earlier. After revealing himself under the mask, McGillis tells Orga and his team his plans to reform the corrupt Gjallarhorn.
19	19	"The Gravity of Wishes"; Transliteration: "Negai no Jūryoku" (Japanese: 願いの重力)	Shinya Watada	Mari Okada	Shinya Watada, Iwao Teraoka	February 14, 2016	October 23, 2016
Following a resupply by the Montag Company, Tekkadan prepare their descent to Earth, with a Gjallarhorn fleet standing in their way. In addition to fending off Gjallarhorn's mobile suits, Tekkadan's pilots must also make it to safety of the landing craft before reentry or risk burning up during the descent down to the surface.
20	20	"Brother"; Transliteration: "Aibō" (Japanese: 相棒)	Seung Hui Son	Shinsuke Onishi	Susumu Nishizawa	February 21, 2016	November 6, 2016 (Note: On the broadcast night of October 29–30, 2016, Adult Swim hosted a Mobile Suit Gundam: Iron Blooded Orphans marathon where they played episodes 13–19.)
Tekkadan arrive on Earth to meet with Togonosuke Makanai, only to realize that he is no longer Prime Minister of Arbrau and is in exile. They have completed their job of escorting Kudelia on her journey, but now they face the problem of finding passage back to Mars without safety from Gjallarhorn's wrath. Furthermore, they are given an offer to accompany Makanai to a parliamentary general session in Edmonton in exchange for safe passage. Upon receiving word that his elder brother Savarin has committed suicide for his actions that resulted in a Dort 3 massacre, Biscuit contemplates on leaving Tekkadan.
21	21	"To the Place of Return"; Transliteration: "Kaeru beki Basho e" (Japanese: 還るべき場所へ)	Shigeru Ueda	Hajime Kamoshida	Hirokazu Hisayuki, Susumu Nishizawa	February 28, 2016	November 13, 2016
When Colonel Carta Issue and the Outer Earth Orbit Regulatory Fleet invade Millennium Island, Orga makes a decision for Tekkadan to escort Kudelia and Makanai to Edmonton for a price. This leads to a standoff between Tekkadan and the Outer Earth Orbit Regulatory Joint fleet which has descended to the surface. While they succeed in stopping the invasion force, Carta tries to kill Orga, whom she realizes is leading Tekkadan. Biscuit, who is driving Orga's vehicle, swerves to throw Orga out before Carta hits it. Mikazuki drives her off, but Biscuit is mortally wounded.
22	22	"Not Yet Home"; Transliteration: "Mada Kaerenai" (Japanese: まだ還れない)	Naomichi Yamato	Michihiro Tsuchiya	Susumu Nishizawa	March 6, 2016	November 20, 2016
Following Gjallarhorn's failed assault on Millennium Island, members of Tekkadan, especially Orga, struggle to come to terms with Biscuit's death. Aboard their transport, Kudelia makes a proposal to Makanai that they take a strategic route to Edmonton from Anchorage to avoid Gjallarhorn. Makanai agrees and asks a key ally of his to journey ahead to lobby for him until their arrival. Meanwhile, Carta continues her mission to intercept Tekkadan against Iznario Fareed's orders.
23	23	"The Final Lie"; Transliteration: "Saigo no Uso" (Japanese: 最後の嘘)	Shouji Ikeno	Mari Okada, Hajime Kamoshida	Susumu Nishizawa, Iwao Teraoka	March 13, 2016	November 27, 2016
Tekkadan's train transport from Alaska to Edmonton is stopped by Carta's forces, who challenges them to a duel for Makanai and Kudelia's custody. Mikazuki responds by himself, wiping her escorts out and seizing Carta's crippled suit, intent on avenging Biscuit. However, Gaelio intervenes in the Gundam Kimaris Trooper before Mikazuki can finish Carta and escapes with her in tow. Despite being rescued from the Gundam Barbatos, Carta dies from her injuries while calling McGillis' name, leaving Gaelio anguished.
24	24	"A Future Reward"; Transliteration: "Mirai no Hōshū" (Japanese: 未来の報酬)	Yoshimitsu Ohashi, Tomo Ōkubo	Mari Okada, Hajime Kamoshida	Iwao Teraoka, Tatsuyuki Nagai	March 20, 2016	December 4, 2016
Upon their arrival in Edmonton, Tekkadan finds Gjallarhorn barricading the city. They fight for 3 days, incurring heavy losses. With only a few hours left before the election, Orga plans one final, but highly risky, operation to get Kudelia and Makanai into the city, where parliamentary elections are about to begin. Unexpected reinforcements arrive, which sees the plan to its success. Gaelio and Ein arrive outside the city to engage with the Tekkadan mobile suits. Gaelio confronts Mikazuki while Ein, now in a powerful mobile suit with his own Alaya-Vijnana, quickly overpowers and destroys all the other Tekkadan suits. When Ein overhears on their radios that Kudelia has entered the city, Ein races there, causing a blackout due to his Ahab reactor. When Ein blocks Orga's convoy, Kudelia leaves her vehicle to confront Ein. Before he can kill her, Mikazuki arrives to stop him. Meanwhile, McGillis arrives in a Montag mobile suit to confront Gaelio.
25	25	"Tekkadan" (Japanese: 鉄華団)	Tatsuyuki Nagai, Shinya Watada	Mari Okada	Tatsuyuki Nagai, Iwao Teraoka	March 27, 2016	December 11, 2016
McGillis reveals his true motives to Gaelio; he goaded Carta to accept a suicide mission so he could take her position, then manipulated Gaelio to allow Ein's transformation into a cyborg abomination - all to discredit Gjallarhorn's current regime with how far it would compromise its values to win. McGillis then states the final piece of his plan is to kill Gaelio so that he can take over his family through marriage to Almira. Enraged, Gaelio's reckless attacks leave him open for McGillis to stab the Gundam Kimaris though the chest, McGillis leaving Gaelio for dead. Kudelia and Makanai make it to the parliament assembly in time utilizing a secret passageway, where Kudelia addresses the assembly and chastises them for their treatment of Mars' people. Mikazuki, outmatched by the Graze Ein, pushes Barbatos to its limit and breaks the Alaya-Vijnana's system limiters to finally kill Ein. Although the strain renders both his right eye and right arm useless, neither affects his ability to pilot a mobile suit with the Alaya-Vijnana. When Makanai wins the election, Orga gives his comrades an order not to die on the battlefield until the cease-fire signal takes place, as their mission is now complete. Tekkadan returns to Mars, while Kudelia remains to advise Makanai and see her vision of a free Mars come to pass.

=== Season 2 (2016–17) ===
No. overall	No. in season	Title	Directed by	Written by	Storyboarded by	Original release date	English air date
26	1	"New Blood"; Transliteration: "Atarashī Chi" (Japanese: 新しい血)	Tatsuyuki Nagai	Mari Okada	Tatsuyuki Nagai	October 2, 2016	October 8, 2017
Makanai has retaken his position as Prime Minister of Arbrau while Tekkadan becomes a formal member of Teiwaz after obtaining rights to half-metal. In addition, Tekkadan is now the official military advisor for Arbrau. Kudelia and Teiwaz form the Admoss Company to mine, process, and ship the half-metal of Arbrau colonies. She also opens an orphanage at the Sakura Farm on Mars. At the same time, the exposure of Gjallarhorn's corruption has caused a mass instability in the Outer Colonies, with more Mobile Suits and Human Debris appearing on the scene. Tekkadan is assigned to escort the Admoss Company on a tour of their mines. There, the new recruits and the Gundam Barbatos Lupus are put to the test against a large pirate faction known as the Dawn Horizon Corps, who have been hired by President Allium Gyojan of Terra Liberionis in retaliation for Kudelia rejecting his bid to use her influence.
27	2	"In the Midst of Jealousy"; Transliteration: "Shishin no Kachū de" (Japanese: 瘯心の渦中で)	Naomichi Yamato	Mari Okada	Susumu Nishizawa	October 9, 2016	October 15, 2017
With the arrival of the upgraded Gundam Barbatos Lupus, Tekkadan successfully repels the Dawn Horizon Corps' invasion but place themselves on the latter's hit-list. Later, McGillis - under his Montag pseudonym - proceeds to hire Tekkadan to eliminate the Dawn Horizon Corps while Arianrhod and Isurugi, McGillis' personal assistant, are each dispatched to Mars to hunt the pirates down as well. Meanwhile, tensions arise when Hush desires to undergo Alaya-Vijnana surgery, despite the fact that his childhood friend Builth was left paralyzed by the surgical procedure during his time with CGS and committed suicide.
28	3	"Battle Before Dawn"; Transliteration: "Yoake mae no Tatakai" (Japanese: 夜明け前の戦い)	Shigeru Ueda	Hajime Kamoshida	Iwao Teraoka	October 16, 2016	October 22, 2017
Tekkadan rendezvous with Gjallarhorn to discuss their joint operation to capture the Dawn Horizon Corps leader Sandoval Reuters, but Orga senses something amiss when Gjallarhorn sends only one ship instead of a whole fleet. Orga agrees to the mission on the condition that Tekkadan take the lead in the operation. Just as Tekkadan encounter the Dawn Horizon Corps' fleet, they discover that the pirate faction has outnumbered them by towing the majority of their ships unpowered behind the lead vessels. Nevertheless, Tekkadan's precise tactics and Mobile Suit squadron mow down majority of the enemy fleet, but the Dawn Horizon Corps strike back with Mobile Suits of their own with many piloted by disposable Human Debris. Just as Tekkadan are about to get their hands on Sandoval, Gjallarhorn's Arianrhod fleet arrives and interferes with the mission, revealing that Isurugi and Arianrhod are under two separate and competing chains of command.
29	4	"The Trigger of Success"; Transliteration: "Shusse no Hikigane" (Japanese: 出世の引き金)	Seung Hui Son	Hajime Kamoshida	Osamu Kamei	October 23, 2016	November 5, 2017
Despite interference from the Arianrhod fleet, Mikazuki is able to capture Reuters, forcing the remaining Dawn Horizon Corps forces to surrender. As a reward for their success, McMurdo Barriston gifts Tekkadan with Chryse's largest half-metal mine, where Tekkadan later discovers a Gundam Frame and another object larger than a mobile suit. Back on Mars, Hush asks Mikazuki to pass on his request of becoming a mobile suit pilot to Orga. Orga and Mikazuki visit Gyojan and demand compensation for Tekkadan's losses against the Dawn Horizon Corps, with Mikazuki executing him for being unable to pay reparations, while the rest of Terra Liberionis is later apprehended by Gjallarhorn. Such brutal actions sadden Kudelia, as she hoped to build a world free of bloodshed for them but is making minimal progress. Orga, Mika and Merribit later meet with McGillis, who requests Tekkadan's aid in gaining more power to challenge his rival, Fleet Commander Rustal Elion, as part of his ongoing plan to reform Gjallarhorn.
30	5	"Inauguration of the Arbrau Defense Forces"; Transliteration: "Āburau Bōei-gun Hossoku Shikiten" (Japanese: アーブラウ防衛軍発足式典)	Shouji Ikeno	Shinsuke Onishi, Mari Okada	Susumu Nishizawa	October 30, 2016	November 12, 2017
Led by Chad, Tekkadan's understaffed Earth branch prepares for the inauguration ceremony of the Arbrau Defense Forces (ADF). However, chaos ensues when a bomb explodes in Makanai's office, seriously injuring both Chad and the Prime Minister. Taking over as replacement commander, Takaki has difficulty handling his fellow Human Debris comrades as they are determined to take revenge. It is revealed that Radice betrayed Tekkadan by leaking the security information to Galan Mossa, who is later assigned as the head of the Arbrau Defense Forces and secretly has connections to Rustall Elion. As tensions rise between Arbrau and the SAU after the bombing, the SAU request McGillis and his command to arbitrate on their behalf. As a war between Arbrau and the SAU is imminent, Orga orders Mikazuki, Eugene, and Akihiro to immediately depart for Earth, with Kudelia joining them.
31	6	"Silent War"; Transliteration: "Muon no Sensō" (Japanese: 無音の戦争)	Kazuo Miyake	Mayori Sekijima	Toshiyuki Fujisawa	November 6, 2016	November 19, 2017
After facing off in the Balfour Plain, the Arbrau and SAU forces engage in a stalemated war after an SAU reconnaissance fighter crashes due to Ahab Reactor interference from Arbrau's mobile suits. While both the SAU and Arbrau's defense forces are inexperienced, Gjallarhorn's Outer Earth Orbit Regulatory Fleet and Tekkadan's Earth Branch are reinforcing each respective side. To make matters worse, all transportation, diplomatic, and military access into Arbrau have been blocked by control of Galan and Radiche, making negotiations or entry for either Tekkadan or McGillis impossible. Meanwhile, Gjallarhorn's garrisons in Arbrau have been forced to remain on their bases, unable to intervene or report outside Arbrau. Takaki, Aston, and their comrades struggle as they engage in non-stop skirmishes, their wits and instincts dulling as they are forced to rely on Galan. Meanwhile, the crew of the Hotarubi arrive within the Earth orbit, but are not permitted to launch a shuttle due to Arbrau's state of emergency. At the last minute, McGillis boards his Graze Ritter to end the stalemate between both factions himself.
32	7	"My Friend"; Transliteration: "Tomo yo" (Japanese: 友よ)	Shinya Watada	Mari Okada, Hajime Kamoshida	Iwao Teraoka, Shinya Watada	November 13, 2016	December 3, 2017
McGillis takes down several Arbrau Mobile Suit units for his team to cut through Arbrau's defense line before engaging with Galan, Takaki, and Aston. Upon being asked if what they are doing is on Orga's orders, Takaki hesitates but then recklessly attacks McGillis, only to get outmatched by the Graze Ritter. Aston sacrifices himself to save Takaki and trap McGillis before Mikazuki arrives and intervenes in the melee, forcing Galan and his troops to retreat. With Tekkadan's arrival, a ceasefire is declared while the situation is assessed. Later, Eugene and Akihiro corner Radiche, demanding Galan's whereabouts. As Tekkadan surrounds Galan's hideout, Hush panics on his first Mobile Suit sortie while Akihiro pins down Galan in battle. Rather than to surrender to Tekkadan, Galan self-destructs his Geirail, taking all evidence of his actions with him. Tekkadan further interrogates Radice, who attempts to talk his way out until Takaki asks to deal with him personally with Mikazuki's gun.
33	8	"Sovereign of Mars"; Transliteration: "Kasei no Ō" (Japanese: 火星の王)	Shun Kudō	Mari Okada	Osamu Kamei	November 20, 2016	December 10, 2017
One month after the end of the SAU-Arbrau War, both factions have agreed to a peace settlement, with Tekkadan withdrawing from Earth. During another meeting, McGillis asks Orga to further help in his quest to reform Gjallarhorn; for once he succeeds, he will bestow all of Gjallarhorn's authority on Mars to Tekkadan, making them the true rulers of the planet. While Orga sees the offer as a chance to fulfill Kudelia's dream of an independent Mars, Merrybit warns that Tekkadan's growth may lead to a conflict with Teiwaz. Wracked with guilt from losing Aston and trusting Radice during the war, Takaki resigns from Tekkadan.
34	9	"Vidar Rising"; Transliteration: "Vidāru Tatsu" (Japanese: ヴィダール立つ)	Naomichi Yamato	Hajime Kamoshida, Mari Okada	Tetsuhito Saito, Shinya Watada	November 27, 2016	December 17, 2017
As Tekkadan complete their withdrawal from Earth, tests are being done on the recently unearthed "Gundam Flauros" for future use. After his embarrassing first sortie in Mobile Suit combat during the SAU-Arbrau War, Hush makes himself Mikazuki's student, despite Mikazuki's reservations. Meanwhile, Naze brings up McGillis' proposal of giving Tekkadan full authority of Mars to Teiwaz, which raises concerns and arguments from McMurdo and Jasley respectively. To ease tensions, Naze is forced to swear on his life that he will keep Tekkadan in check. After Amida and Jasley have a tense conversation, Naze meets up with Orga and warns him to watch his back, as some of Teiwaz's top dogs may want him out of the picture. Elsewhere, Rustal's forces, led by pilots Julieta Juris and Iok Kujan, engage in battle with the independence insurgents at an Oceanian Federation space colony, before the masked man known as "Vidar" enters the battlefield in his namesake Mobile Suit; the Gundam Vidar.
35	10	"Awakening Calamity"; Transliteration: "Mezameshi Yakusai" (Japanese: 目覚めし厄祭)	Shigeru Ueda	Tatsuto Higuchi, Mari Okada	Osamu Kamei, Kazuki Akane	December 4, 2016	January 7, 2018
Orga tells McGillis of the Gundam Flauros and the Pluma that Tekkadan excavated on Mars, along with a much larger unit discovered in the area. McGillis tells him to stop the excavation immediately, revealing what they discovered is an ancient Mobile Armor; a forbidden piece of technology that caused both the Calamity War and the mass casualties associated with the conflict. Meanwhile, Jasley has his men spy on Tekkadan and McGillis' activities, before informing Rustal's fleet of McGillis' secret trip to Mars through his connections with the Kujan Family. Vidar suspects that McGillis is out to destroy the Mobile Armor to earn the Order of the Seven Stars; the highest honor within Gjallarhorn. Aboard the Saisei, Tekkadan and Teiwaz's mechanics activate the Pluma, which wreaks havoc on the hangar. Upon his arrival on Mars, McGillis reveals to Tekkadan that Mobile Armors are fully automated, therefore making them capable of unrestrained violence, and that Mobile Suits - especially the Gundams - were created to destroy them. As soon as Tekkadan and McGillis reach the excavation site, Iok and his platoon stage an ambush to arrest McGillis, but the presence of their Mobile Suits accidentally activates the Mobile Armor.
36	11	"Stained Wings"; Transliteration: "Kegareta Tsubasa" (Japanese: 穢れた翼)	Seung Hui Son	Hiroyuki Yoshino	Kazuki Akane, Tetsuhito Saito	December 11, 2016	January 14, 2018
The Mobile Armor Hashmal awakens from its 300-year slumber and lays waste to Iok's Mobile Suit platoon. Tekkadan and McGillis retreat from the mining plant, while Iok is forced by his comrades to fall back as well. McGillis reveals that the Hashmal destroyed the nearby fuel depot and Gjallarhorn's third ground base to resupply, as the Plumas that accompany the Mobile Armor are not equipped with Ahab Reactors, warning that the Hashmal spawns multiple Plumas to refuel and repair it. They must act fast to trap and destroy the Mobile Armor, as it will set a course for Chryse and wipe out the city's population. Despite warnings from Mikazuki and Hush of the Hashmal's arrival, Kudelia and Atra refuse to evacuate. As Tekkadan prepare to corner the Hashmal in a gorge, it changes its course toward the public agricultural plant after being fired upon by Iok. Akihiro's unit scrambles to defend the plant, but the Hashmal wipes out a portion of the plant with its beam cannon. Mikazuki arrives in the Barbatos Lupus to save Ride from the Pluma swarm before setting his sights on the Mobile Armor. Meanwhile, Julieta finds and rescues Iok while McGillis and Isurugi are confronted by the Gundam Vidar.
37	12	"Battle for Chryse"; Transliteration: "Kuryuse Bōei-sen" (Japanese: クリュセ防衛戦)	Shouji Ikeno	Hajime Kamoshida, Mari Okada	Iwao Teraoka, Osamu Kamei	December 18, 2016	January 21, 2018
Just as the Gundam Barbatos Lupus is about to confront the Hashmal, Mikazuki freezes and starts to bleed through his nose. Meanwhile, Vidar offers cryptic responses to McGillis that suggest he is actually Gaelio Bauduin, his betrayed former comrade, before retreating to help Julieta and Iok. Akihiro charges toward the Mobile Armor, but the Gundam Gusion Rebake Full City's Alaya-Vijnana System suddenly locks up and he is knocked unconscious. Orga learns the Gundams automatically overclock when facing a Mobile Armor and will shut down if the user can't or won't release their limiters. The Hashmal breaks through Tekkadan's defenses in the gorge while Julieta prevents Iok from attacking it again, as his heavily-damaged Reginlaze will only be a distraction. With time running out, Orga sorties Shino and Yamagi in the Gundam Flauros to separate the Mobile Armor from its Plumas with the Galaxy Cannon, but they fail to slow the Hashmal itself. As Tekkadan dispatch the rest of the Plumas, Mikazuki stops the Hashmal from killing McGillis, Isurugi, Ride, and Julieta, risking his body to unleash the Gundam Barbatos Lupus' full potential by releasing its limiters.
38	13	"Hunter of Angels"; Transliteration: "Tenshi o Karu Mono" (Japanese: 天使を狩る者)	Shinya Watada	Tatsuto Higuchi, Mari Okada	Iwao Teraoka, Tetsuhito Saito, Shinichi Oshimi	December 25, 2016	January 28, 2018
In a grueling showdown, Mikazuki fights and slays the Hashmal, despite the Gundam Barbatos Lupus sustaining heavy damage - and consequently, his entire right side becoming paralyzed from the strain of the battle. One month later, Orga reports to McMurdo about the incident and Gjallarhorn's searching for other Calamity War remnants on Mars. As a show of trust, Orga gives McMurdo his sakazuki cup to break, should Tekkadan be considered a hindrance to Teiwaz. While McMurdo declines to break the cup due to his investments on Mars, he warns Orga that any betrayal of Teiwaz would lead to severe consequences for Tekkadan. Meanwhile, McGillis explains his side of the incident to the Seven Stars council, placing the blame on Iok. Rustal refuses to agree with Iok due to a lack of evidence to support his argument, allowing McGillis to claim credit for slaying the Hashmal. Later, Rustal grants Julieta her request to become the test pilot for Gjallarhorn's new machine, which is powerful but unstable. Fearing that Mikazuki may not come back from the next battle, Atra begs Kudelia to bear his children. Humiliated by McGillis, feeling betrayed by Rustal's refusal to defend him and obsessed with his honor and his men's sacrifice, Iok orders his servants to contact Jasley.
39	14	"Counsel"; Transliteration: "Jogen" (Japanese: 助言)	Kazuo Miyake	Mari Okada, Hiroyuki Yoshino	Hirotaka Endo, Osamu Kamei	January 15, 2017	February 4, 2018
The Turbines bid farewell to Tekkadan. Following a tip-off by Jasley, Iok leads a crackdown on the Turbines in his quest to take down Tekkadan. Aboard the Hammerhead, Naze and Amida recall the time they first met and how they formed the Turbines and joined Teiwaz. Atra contemplates having a baby with Mikazuki herself. Later, Mikazuki, Atra and Hush pay McMurdo a visit when they learn Naze has gone missing, learning from a chagrined McMurdo that Gjallarhorn found a banned weapon called the "Dáinsleif" - a railgun that is the basis for the Gundam Flauros' cannons - aboard one of the Turbines' freighters. Orga contacts Naze, who tells him not to worry about the Turbines and to continue his focus on Tekkadan.
40	15	"Lit by a Blazing Sun"; Transliteration: "Moyuru Taiyō ni Terasarete" (Japanese: 燃ゆる太陽に照らされて)	Naomichi Yamato	Yōsuke Kuroda	Tetsuhito Saito, Osamu Kamei	January 22, 2017	February 11, 2018
With the Turbines targeted by Gjallarhorn, McMurdo has Mikazuki inform Orga that Teiwaz will not intervene in the situation. Naze announces to McMurdo that the Turbines will disband, provided McMurdo takes in the female members. Shino and Akihiro propose to rescue the Turbines as the Arianrhod fleet close in on their relay station. Naze and Amida provide cover for their comrades to evacuate, but Iok orders his Dáinsleif squadron to open fire at the transport ships. Amida rushes to protect the transports in her Hyakuren, but is confronted by Julieta and her Reginlaze Julia. Akihiro, Shino, and Ride arrive at the scene to assist in the evacuation while Naze sends the Hammerhead on a kamikaze run toward the fleet. Amida manages to best Julieta, but the Dáinsleif squadron shoot her down and critically damage the Hammerhead, which collides with two of the fleet's ships. Naze and Amida's deaths are mourned across Teiwaz, by everyone from Kudelia's office to Tekkadan's headquarters.
41	16	"Natural for a Human"; Transliteration: "Hito to Shite Atarimae no" (Japanese: 人として当たり前の)	Shigeru Ueda	Mari Okada	Hirotaka Endo, Shinichi Oshimi	January 29, 2017	February 18, 2018
As Tekkadan and the surviving Turbines mourn the loss of Naze and Amida, McMurdo lets the former Turbines members in under his wing as promised. Azee convinces Lafter to show her true feelings to Akihiro, though she decides to remain with Teiwaz instead of staying with Tekkedan. Meanwhile, after looking at Naze's children, Mikazuki startles Atra by bluntly asking her if she'd like to have a baby with him. Just as Lafter is shopping for a gift for Akihiro, she is shot dead by one of Jasley's subordinates. Following the incident, Orga and McGillis promise to help each other take down Iok and Jasley to achieve their long-term goals.
42	17	"Settlement"; Transliteration: "Otoshimae" (Japanese: 落とし前)	Yūki Asada	Tatsuto Higuchi, Mari Okada	Tetsuhito Saito, Osamu Kamei, Yūki Asada	February 5, 2017	February 25, 2018
Tekkadan wages war on the JPT Trust. As Tekkadan's Mobile Suit squadron mows down the enemy units, Jasley contacts McMurdo to ask for help, but McMurdo reveals Jasley's plan to have him arrested by Gjallarhorn so he will take over Teiwaz. He also informs Jasley about his deal with Rustal to sweep the Turbines incident under the rug - thus leaving JPT Trust alone to deal with Tekkadan, who's severed ties with Teiwaz is represented by Orga's broken sakasuki cup. Jasley calls for a conditional ceasefire, but Orga refuses the deal before allowing Mikazuki to destroy the bridge of Jasley's ship, killing the latter and avenging Lafter. Meanwhile, Isurugi broadcasts his speech revealing the corruption of Gjallarhorn, making particular note of how Rustal and Iok's actions led to the SAU-Arbrau war and the elimination of the Turbines. With no one left to trust, Tekkadan sever their ties with the Admoss Company to take part in the revolution led by McGillis.
43	18	"Revealed Intentions"; Transliteration: "Tadorisuita Shin'i" (Japanese: たどりついた真意)	Seung Hui Son	Hajime Kamoshida, Mari Okada	Hiroshi Kobayashi, Masami Obari	February 12, 2017	March 4, 2018
Three days after Tekkadan's assault on JPT Trust, McGillis' faction and Tekkadan launch a coup d'etat on the Seven Stars headquarters, taking all but Rustal and Iok prisoner while preparing for a counterattack by the Arianrhod fleet. McGillis prepares to board the Gundam Bael - the first Gundam ever built, rumored to contain the soul of Gjallarhorn founder Agnika Kaieru - but he is suddenly confronted by Vidar, who unmasks himself as Gaelio Bauduin. Before they can come to blows, Mikazuki intervenes in the rebuilt Gundam Barbatos Lupus Rex and battles the Gundam Vidar, but Gaelio matches him by revealing his Gundam uses a pseudo Alaya-Vijnana System based on Ein Dalton's brain. Gaelio retreats from the duel when McGillis boards and launches in the Gundam Bael. As McGillis broadcasts his speech worldwide, he is interrupted by Gaelio, who declares his intent to defeat his former comrade.
44	19	"The Man Who Holds the Soul"; Transliteration: "Tamashī wo Te ni Shita Otoko" (Japanese: 魂を手にした男)	Shouji Ikeno	Mari Okada, Tatsuto Higuchi	Shinichi Oshimi, Susumu Nishizawa	February 19, 2017	March 11, 2018
Taking advantage of Gaelio's interrupting McGillis, Rustal makes a counterpoint to McGillis' speech and exposes the latter's treachery to the Seven Stars on his broadcast. Almiria confronts McGillis over the truth about her brother Gaelio and threatens to kill him, but he instead injures himself to stop her committing suicide. As the captive Seven Stars members wish to stay neutral in the conflict, McGillis informs Orga that only his faction and Tekkadan will face the combined might of the Arianrhod fleet, much to Orga's dismay. After a long talk with Kudelia, Atra confesses her true feelings for Mikazuki.
45	20	"If This Is the End"; Transliteration: "Kore ga Saigonara" (Japanese: これが最後なら)	Shinya Watada	Yōsuke Kuroda	Iwao Teraoka, Osamu Kamei	February 26, 2017	March 18, 2018
The war between Tekkadan & McGillis' faction against the Arianrhod fleet begins with Julieta engaging Mikazuki in a fierce battle. Rustal instigates a false flag maneuver by having a revolutionary's Graze hijacked to fire a Dáinsleif toward his own forces, letting him justify a massive counterattack with the railguns that lays waste to the revolutionaries' fleet. Tekkadan tries to provide support, but the Dáinsleif Squadron's second volley severely damages both the Hotarubi and Gundam Flaruos, injuring Shino in the process. Orga ponders retreating, but his men convince him to see the battle through and he orders the Isaribi to charge through Arianrhod's main fleet. As McGilis rallies his troops, Gaelio duels him with the restored Gundam Kimaris Vidar. The Hotarubi is used as a shield for the Isaribi to allow Shino a shot at the Arianrhod Flagship with his Gundam's railgun - only for Julieta to throw off his aim, causing him to narrowly miss the bridge of Rustal's ship. Disparaging, Shino charges toward the Arianrhod fleet in a kamikaze run and Gundam Flaruos is destroyed by return fire.
46	21	"For Whom?"; Transliteration: "Taga Tame" (Japanese: 誰が為)	Kazuo Miyake	Hajime Kamoshida, Mari Okada	Hiroshi Kobayashi, Kyōhei Ishiguro	March 5, 2017	March 25, 2018
Orga and Eugene argue over trying to rescue Shino as Mikazuki critically injures Julieta to end their intense duel. Ultimately, Eugene forces Orga to back down and flies the Isaribi away as the Hotarubi self-destructs, releasing a Nano-Mirror Chaff that disrupts all communication with the Arianrhod fleet. McGillis battles Gaelio but, still injured from stopping Almira's suicide, his left hand gives out and Isurugi sacrifices himself to save McGillis from Gaelio's attack. After Tekkadan and the revolutionary forces retreat back to Mars, Gaelio recovers Julieta while Orga, Eugene, and McGillis discuss their strategy going forward. As they arrive above Mars, Tekkadan and the revolutionaries learn that the Mars Branch is withholding support from McGillis, as he has been officially stripped of his rank and title back on Earth.
47	22	"Scapegoat"; Transliteration: "Ikenie" (Japanese: 生け贄)	Shigeru Ueda	Mari Okada	Tetsuhito Saito, Osamu Kamei	March 12, 2017	April 8, 2018
Rustal takes full control of Gjallarhorn and the Seven Stars, delegitimizing McGillis by revealing Iznario Fareed adopted him. Upon returning to Mars, Tekkadan finds the media has vilified them - the majority of their accounts have been frozen and their clients have stopped supporting them. Nobliss Gordon also ceases funding to Admoss Company and will only restore it if Kudelia cuts ties with Tekkadan. During a team meeting held by Orga, Zack quits the organization in fear of his life. Kudelia learns Mikazuki and Atra may have conceived, promising to help raise their child. Orga asks McMurdo to set up a call with Rustal, whom he offers a deal; allow Tekkadan's members to live and Orga will disband the group, hand over McGillis and return the Gundam Bael. To Orga's horror, Rustal refuses as he wants Tekkadan to be a scapegoat, slaughtered by the Arianrhod fleet in order to restore both public faith in Gjallarhorn and peace in the Earth sphere. As every Tekkadan member is a wanted criminal, Kudelia proposes manipulating Arbrau's database to give the members new identities. Merribit and Dexter manage to secure funds from one of Tekkadan's accounts to keep the organization afloat - but just before they can call Makanai, the base is surrounded by Gjallarhorn.
48	23	"Promise"; Transliteration: "Yakusoku" (Japanese: 約束)	Shouji Ikeno	Mari Okada	Hirotaka Endo, Susumu Nishizawa	March 19, 2017	April 15, 2018
Gjallarhorn's forces surround Tekkadan's headquarters and cut the organization's means of outside communication. Orga plans for his comrades to escape to Chryse through a series of old Calamity War tunnels while McGillis creates a diversion by penetrating through Gjallarhorn's front lines. After making his plans, Orga escorts Kudelia and Atra back to Admoss Company for their safety. Despite disarming his Reginlaze, Iok charges the Gundam Bael but McGillis quickly downs him, prompting Gjallarhorn to launch a counterattack. Upon their arrival at Admoss Company, Orga discovers that Gjallarhorn manipulated the media to make the public think Tekkadan ignored orders to surrender. Makanai agrees to help Tekkadan with their new identities, but they must return to Earth to finalize the process - which Azee offers in an email, stating the former Turbines can smuggle them through Teiwaz's Mars office. Just as Orga, Chad, and Ride head back to base, they are ambushed by hitmen on Nobliss' orders and Orga dies protecting Ride.
49	24	"McGillis Fareed"; Transliteration: "Makugirisu Farido" (Japanese: マクギリス・ファリド)	Tomo Ōkubo	Mari Okada	Hirotaka Endo, Osamu Kamei, Iwao Teraoka	March 26, 2017	April 22, 2018
Following Orga's death, Mikazuki rallies the rest of Tekkadan around Orga's orders to live until the end. As Gjallarhorn begins their assault on the base, McGillis battles the Arianrhod fleet by himself before Gaelio intervenes, pushing his Alaya-Vijnana Type Ein to its limit to match McGillis. The ground battle turns against Tekkedan as Hush is killed, while the heavily-damaged Gundam Kimaris Vidar manages to cripple the Gundam Bael and seriously wound McGillis as the two crash into Rustal's ship. Abandoning the Bael, McGillis tries to reach Rustal on the bridge but is cut off and shot by Gaelio, whose mask blunts McGillis' own gunshot. Confronting the dying McGillis, Gaelio learns the reason McGillis betrayed him and Carta was because the trio's friendship caused his drive for power to waver, while his ambitions of reforming Gjallarhorn were because he promised to make Almiria happy. Conflicted, Gaelio breaks down and tearfully bids McGillis farewell as the latter succumbs to his wounds. As Tekkadan struggles to repel the Gjallarhorn forces, Rustal notes McGillis' story will be remembered as a tragic consequence of those thirsting for power and sends Julieta to finish Tekkadan off.
50	25	"Their Place"; Transliteration: "Karera no Ibasho" (Japanese: 彼らの居場所)	Tatsuyuki Nagai, Shinya Watada	Mari Okada	Iwao Teraoka, Hiroshi Kobayashi, Tatsuyuki Nagai	April 2, 2017	April 29, 2018
Mikazuki and Akihiro hold off Gjallarhorn's forces while Eugene and the others escape through the now-clear tunnel to Chryse, but Rustal orders the Graze units to retreat as a Dáinsleif squadron obliterates the base from orbit. Despite crippling damage, both Gundams rise to continue fighting and Akihiro crushes Iok to death, avenging the deceased Turbines before he is killed by Iok's subordinates. Mikazuki releases Barbatos' limiters one final time, decimating the Gjallarhorn soldiers until Julieta intervenes. Disillusioned with Rustal's political intrigue, Julieta asks why Mikazuki still fights and his answer is simply wishing to survive. As he engages Julieta, Barbatos gives out from its damages and Mikazuki dies from his injuries, while Julieta claims Barbatos' head as proof of Gjallarhorn's victory - ending what becomes known as the "McGillis Fareed Incident". In the following years, Gjallarhorn repeals the Seven Stars council system after losing the Issue, Kujan and Fareed family heirs - and ironically, Rustal's policies mirror McGillis' ideals, restructuring the government as a democratic system. Earth's influence on Mars erodes after Rustal reduces the size of Gjallarhorn's Mars branch, granting Mars' cities independence as the Martian Union with Kudelia as their first chairperson. Rustal and Kudelia additionally sign the Human Debris Abolishment Treaty in an effort to reduce conflict and suffering in the solar system. Julieta - publicly credited with defeating Mikazuki and presumed to be Gjallarhorn's next leader - visits a hospitalized Gaelio, in therapy after removing his pseudo Alaya-Vijnana; Both reminisce on and express their regret over the tragic ends of McGillis and Tekkadan, though resolve to keep moving forward. While largely forgotten, Tekkadan's surviving members live on with new identities in the Admoss Company, Sakura's orphanage, the Martian Union and the Kassapa Mobile Worker Factory, with all of them remaining in touch. Ride assassinates Nobliss and his cohorts to avenge Orga, while Kudelia visits Atra and Akatsuki - the late Mikazuki's son by Atra - at Sakura's farm, fulfilling her promise to look after them. Kudelia silently monologues that while Mikazuki and Tekkadan are gone, she could still love the world that they sacrificed their lives to change, even if the world itself won't remember them.
