= List of Mobile Suit Gundam Unicorn episodes =

Mobile Suit Gundam Unicorn is an anime OVA series by Sunrise, adapted from the novel of the same title by Harutoshi Fukui. The plot revolves around Banagher Links, a seemingly normal schoolboy living in the space colony Industrial 7. His life changes one day when he meets a mysterious girl named Audrey Burne, as the encounter brings him into contact with a new Gundam and its connections to an item called "Laplace's Box".

In the June 2009 issue of the Japanese monthly manga magazine Gundam Ace, it was announced that an anime adaptation of Gundam Unicorn was green-lit for late 2009 and later moved to spring 2010. It is directed by Kazuhiro Furuhashi and features screenplays written by Yasuyuki Muto. Hajime Katoki, who was the mechanical designer for the novel, works on the anime alongside veteran designers Junya Ishigaki and Mika Akitaka, and newcomer Nobuhiko Genba. Yoshikazu Yasuhiko's character designs were adapted for the series by Kumiko Takahashi, and the music is composed by Hiroyuki Sawano. It was planned to be six 50-minute episodes with a worldwide release. However, on May 13, 2012, Bandai announced that the storyline will wrap up with a seventh episode. The series premiered on PlayStation Network Japan for PlayStation 3 and PlayStation Portable systems on February 20, 2010. The Blu-ray Disc edition was released simultaneously worldwide on March 12, 2010, featuring both Japanese and English audio and subtitles in five languages (Japanese, English, French, Spanish and Chinese). Bandai Entertainment released the first four episodes of Unicorn on DVD before shutting down in 2012. Sunrise released the OVA series on DVD in North America in four volumes with distribution from Right Stuf Inc. beginning in August 2013. The OVA ran from February 20, 2010, to June 6, 2014.

A television rebroadcast series of the anime titled Mobile Suit Gundam Unicorn RE:0096 was announced by Sunrise on February 21, 2016, and began airing on April 3, 2016, in Japan on TV Asahi and other networks, replacing Brave Beats. This is the first Gundam series to air on TV Asahi since After War Gundam X which ended in 1996. The rebroadcast features new animated footage and next episode previews narrated by Shuichi Ikeda as his Full Frontal character, as well as a new opening and two new ending themes all composed by Hiroyuki Sawano under his alias, "SawanoHiroyuki[nZk]", the first opening theme titled "Into the Sky" is performed by SawanoHiroyuki[nZk]:Tielle, the first ending theme titled "Next 2U -eUC-" is performed by SawanoHiroyuki[nZk]:naNami and the second ending theme titled "bL∞dy f8 -eUC-" is performed by SawanoHiroyuki[nZk]:Aimer. On November 29, 2016, it was announced that the English dub of RE:0096 would make its television broadcast premiere on Adult Swim's Toonami programming block on January 8, 2017, and ended on June 11, 2017. (Note: Adult Swim lists the series as premiering on January 7, 2017 at 1 a.m. ET/PT, which is effectively January 8.)

== Episodes ==
=== Mobile Suit Gundam Unicorn episodes ===
No.	Title	Original release date
1	"Day of the Unicorn"; Transliteration: "Yunikōn no Hi" (Japanese: ユニコーンの日)	February 20, 2010
A Neo-Zeon remnant group called the "Sleeves" travels to Side 4's Industrial 7 colony, so that its captain, Zinnerman, can receive a "key" to something known as "Laplace's Box" from Vist Foundation leader Cardeas Vist. The item is said to be capable of either restoring the future or destroying the world. Audrey Burne seeks to meet Vist first and convince him not to turn over Laplace's Box, believing the Sleeves will use it to start another war. Along the way, she is rescued by 16-year-old student Banagher Links, who agrees to take her to Vist. Meanwhile, a battle breaks out between the Federation's Londo Bell taskforce and the Sleeves. As the collateral damage rises, the colony is evacuated. Amidst the chaos, Banagher discovers the fatally wounded Cardeas Vist in the cockpit of the Unicorn Gundam. Before his death, Vist entrusts the Gundam to Banagher, who realizes that Vist is his father. Banagher then launches in the Unicorn and confronts the Sleeves' elite pilot, Marida Cruz, who is piloting the Kshatriya. Episode 1's theme song is "Ryūsei no Namida" by Chiaki Kuriyama
2	"The Second Coming of Char" ("The Red Comet") (Note: The literal translation of episode two's Japanese title is "The Red Comet", an honorary title that was bestowed upon the character Char Aznable, whom Full Frontal was designed to emulate. However the title "The Second Coming of Char" was chosen by Sunrise for the English release.); Transliteration: "Akai Suisei" (Japanese: 赤い彗星)	November 12, 2010
The transformed Unicorn Gundam overpowers the Kshatriya and Marida is ordered to retreat. The Unicorn is picked up by the Londo Bell ship Nahel Argama. Banagher is questioned by Daguza Mackle about how he came to possess the Unicorn Gundam but is interrupted by the Sleeves' surprise attack. Full Frontal, the leader of Neo Zeon, demands that the Nahel Argama hand over any items related to Laplace's Box, including the Unicorn. Daguza tries to ensure safe passage by holding Audrey - revealed to be Zeon Princess Mineva Lao Zabi - hostage, but Frontal refuses to accept they have the real Mineva. With no other choice, Banagher sorties in the Unicorn against the Sinanju; he fights well, but is captured when blindsided by the Kshatriya. Banagher is taken to meet Frontal at the Sleeves asteroid base of Palau. After discussing the nature of Zeon with Marida, who is placed in charge of watching over Banagher, a crew member from the Nahel Argama disguised as a bum bumps into Banagher and passes him a map and a transmitter, telling him to get to the 14th space gate or risk being killed in the coming battle. Banagher laments over how the colony will become a battlefield soon. Episode 2's theme song is "Everlasting" by Kylee
3	"The Ghost of Laplace"; Transliteration: "Rapurasu no Bōrei" (Japanese: ラプラスの亡霊)	March 5, 2011
The Earth Federation and ECOAS execute their assault on Palau, with the intention of rescuing Banagher and the Unicorn. Saboteurs destroy Palau's connecting bridges, while the Nahel Argama unleashes its Hyper-Mega Particle Cannon, pushing the asteroids towards each other to damage much of the Sleeves' forces. Any Sleeves unit getting out is ambushed by ECOAS units hiding in the rocks. Riddhe springs Audrey from detention so they can go to Earth and talk to his father, Ronan, but not before trying to convince a surprised Micott about their intentions. Banagher finds the Unicorn Gundam and tries to escape, defeating Marida in the process. She is eventually captured and Alberto Vist is allowed to escort her to an Anaheim Electronics facility on Earth. Banagher and Daguza proceed to the remains of Laplace with the intention of activating Laplace's Box, but hear the original broadcast of the Earth Federation establishment ceremony. The Sleeves are not far behind and the EFSF/ECOAS units fight them. The Sinanju appears and Daguza sacrifices his life to buy Banagher some time to activate the Unicorn's Destroy Mode. The fight sheds parts of the Laplace colony and sends them into the atmosphere. Banagher continues to pursue Full Frontal during the reentry, but a beam magnum shot meant for the Sinanju hits Gilboa Sant instead. As Banagher enters the atmosphere, Audrey arrives at the Marcenas estate. Note: This episode was co-produced by Studio Ghibli. Episode 3's theme song is "merry-go-round" by Chemistry
4	"At the Bottom of the Gravity Well"; Transliteration: "Jūryoku no Ido no Soko de" (Japanese: 重力の井戸の底で)	November 12, 2011
The Zeon Remnant forces attack the Federation Capitol Building at Dakar in a feint operation to allow the Garencieres to descend to Earth safely. Banagher is revealed to have been rescued from death by landing on the Garencieres mid-descent. Marida is transported to a Federation facility in North America, where Martha Vist Carbine manipulates her using the wreck of an old Mass-Production Qubeley, which she had piloted in the past. Audrey is held at the Marcenas estate. Riddhe escapes after his father, Ronan, tells him the truth about Laplace's Box. Audrey briefly escapes captivity long enough to have an insightful conversation with an old man in a local diner, which strengthens her resolve. Bright Noa is ordered to take Riddhe on board the Ra Cailum under his command, as well as capture the Garencieres. After being called in from around the world, the Zeon Remnant forces band together and assault Torrington Base en masse. The Shamblo's pilot, Loni Garvey, falls victim to the malfunctioning on-board psycommu system, becoming a channel for her dead father's bloodlust and begins indiscriminately massacring the population of a local city, despite being ordered to avoid causing collateral damage. Banagher, appalled by the resulting destruction, confronts Zinnerman about his hypocritical rationalizing of the situation and flies out in the Unicorn Gundam to put a stop to Loni's rampage. After failing to reason with her, he activates the NT-D in a last-ditch effort to stop her without resorting to lethal force. Incensed by Banagher's refusal to kill Loni, Riddhe decides to kill her himself, much to Banagher's dismay, and orders him at gunpoint to hand over the Unicorn Gundam according to Captain Bright's orders. As he threatens Banagher, the two witness a mysterious black-colored Unicorn Gundam being dropped into the battlefield. Episodes 4's theme song is "B-Bird" by earthmind
5	"Black Unicorn"; Transliteration: "Kuroi Yunikōn" (Japanese: 黒いユニコーン)	May 19, 2012
After neutralizing the Delta Plus, the newly arrived Banshee captures the Unicorn and returns it to the Ra Cailum, where Riddhe encounters and attempts to question Alberto Vist of Anaheim Electronics' motives, only to be ignored. Meanwhile, on the Garuda, Martha requests Mineva's assistance to coerce Banagher's cooperation in disclosing the location of Laplace's Box. On the Ra Cailum, Bright speaks with Banagher and comes to terms with the latter's actions, before learning of the Federation's covert deployment of the new Dogosse Gier-class battleship General Revil. He sends orders to the Nahel Argama, instructing them to rendezvous with the Garencieres. The Tri-Stars, Riddhe, Marida and Banagher are assigned to provide cover while the Unicorn Gundam is transferred back to the Garuda. However, combat between the Garuda and Garencieres' forces breaks out, and in the ensuing chaos, Banagher restrains the Banshee long enough for Zimmerman to board the Garuda. Riddhe enters the Garuda's rear docking bay and confronts Anaheim staff to rescue Mineva, but before he can do so, Zimmerman begins firing on them. Mineva takes advantage of the distraction to reach Zimmerman, who gives her a parachute. An exploding Anksha damages the docking bay and incapacitates Zimmerman. Riddhe pleads with Mineva to no avail; she leaps off the Garuda and is caught by Banagher, who activates the Unicorn's NT-D system. After he brings Mineva to the Garencieres, Banagher forces the Banshee into the Garuda hangar. Marida identifies the Delta Plus as a Gundam and decimates it with the Banshee's Armed Armor VN claw. Having regained consciousness, Zimmerman reaches out to Marida and implores that she return to the Garencieres. Realizing her original identity, Marida falls out of the Banshee's cockpit unconscious. The Garencieres undergoes the next phase of its mission and attempts to link with the Nahel Argama as per the original mission. However, an engine malfunction causes the ship to fall out of its designated trajectory. Despite this, the Nahel Argama fires its tow cable, which is caught by the Unicorn; the forces exerted on the machine threaten to pull it apart. The spirits of Daguza Mackle and Gilboa Sant appear, resulting in the Unicorn's psycoframe producing a green luminescence, helping the Garencieres achieve orbit. Both ships find themselves under heavy fire from the General Revil. Flast believes that this was orchestrated by the Federation, but Mineva notes that the Federation attack patterns imply their intent on destroying the Garencieres and the Nahel Argama. Banagher attempts to engage the forces, but the Unicorn has exhausted its fuel supply. Angelo Sauper and his YAMS-132 Rozen Zulu appears and lays waste to the Federation mobile suits. He buys enough time for Full Frontal to head straight for the Revil and open fire with his rocket bazooka. Episode 5's theme song is "Broken Mirror" by Boom Boom Satellites
6	"Two Worlds, Two Tomorrows" ("The Sky and the Stars") (Note: The literal translation of episode six's Japanese title is "The Sky and the Stars". However the title "Two Worlds, Two Tomorrows" was chosen by Sunrise for the English release.); Transliteration: "sora to hoshi to" (Japanese: 宇宙(そら)と地球(ほし)と)	March 2, 2013
Full Frontal and Angelo Sauper comes in to rescue the Nahel Argama and the Garencieres as the EFSF flagship General Revil bears down on them. The Londo Bell Tri-Stars chase down the Garencieres, which suddenly blows up as a decoy to buy time for the Sleeves to take over the Nahel Argama. In explaining the takeover, Full Frontal says it was an opportunity to finally open Laplace's Box, reveals his memories of the events of Char's Counterattack and his reasons for continuing to oppose the Earth Federation; implying very strongly that he is in fact Char Aznable. He leaves Angelo in charge of the vessel as it heads back to Industrial 7 - where the last clue leads to - along with the Rewloola. A group of crewmen send out an SOS prompting the Federation's Luna II base to send a Salamis cruiser in pursuit. Captain Otto defies Angelo's orders to destroy the warship, breaking up the arrangement. An ECOAS team led by Conroy Haagensen assaults the Nahel Argama and gradually fights the Neo-Zeon troops back to the MS hangar deck. Banagher activates the Unicorn to aid in the attack, but Full Frontal faces him and threatens him with death if he doesn't join the Neo-Zeon's cause, since Mineva already knows where the Box is. With Mineva's help, Marida reactivates the Kshatriya to prevent Angelo from destroying the Nahel Argama but declares that they aren't supporting Full Frontal's plan to use the Box to launch another war with the Federation. As Marida seeks Zinnerman's permission to fight the Sleeves, he decides to finally let her go and live her own life. Angelo and Full Frontal fly back to the Rewloola in Angelo's Rozen Zulu. Back on Earth, Martha Vist threatens Bright Noa and Londo Bell with being left out of the pursuit operation if they do not co-operate with her. She also barges into a meeting of Ronan Marcenas and several EFSF politicians to announce her intentions to prevent the Box's opening. Upon entering the region near Industrial 7, Banagher flies out in the Full Armor Unicorn Gundam to get closer to opening the Box. A surprise awaits him though - the Unicorn Banshee Norn, piloted by Riddhe Marcenas, who was earlier briefed by Alberto Vist about the origins of the Vist Foundation. Episode 6's theme song is "Re: I Am" by Aimer
SP	"Mobile Suit Gundam UC: One of Seventy-Two"; Transliteration: "Kidou Senshi Gundam UC: ONE OF SEVENTY TWO" (Japanese: 機動戦士ガンダムUC: ONE OF SEVENTY TWO)	August 3, 2013 (DOME-G, Gundam Front Tokyo)
The Sleeves test the AMX-107R ReBawoo mobile suit in a shoal zone on December 3, UC 0095. Having learned about the test, the Earth Federation and Anaheim Electronics sends one ship each to investigate the Sleeves' test as Martha Vist Carbine watches the operation unfold. The Federation deploys the Unicorn Gundam Unit 3 Phenex in a bid to destroy the ReBawoo and the Unicorn Banshee. The ReBawoo splits up and escapes as the two Unicorn Gundams fight each other in Destroy Mode. When the two units' psychoframes resonate, Martha orders the operation terminated, but the Phenex suddenly breaks away and makes for the Federation ship. Two Federation officials aboard the ship are aghast to see the Phenex just outside the bridge before the screen fades to black.
7	"Over the Rainbow"; Transliteration: "Niji no Kanata ni" (Japanese: 虹の彼方に)	June 6, 2014
Banagher and Riddhe continue to fight each other as the Nahel Argama crew and the Sleeves join forces with Conroy's ECOAS troops in taking on the Neo-Zeon forces around Industrial 7. In the ensuing battle, Banagher is able to break away and resupply for the trip to the colony, taking along Mineva while disposing of Angelo along the way. Marida launches in the Kshatriya Repaired to keep Riddhe at bay, however, because of conflicting voices from several people, Riddhe is forced to kill her and later regrets doing it. As a last act, Marida warns everyone of a new threat. Zinnerman aids the Nahel Argama crew in the battle. Banagher and Mineva arrive at Industrial 7 and head towards Magallanica, where Syam Vist and Gael are. Seeing that the two proved themselves as Newtypes through the Unicorn, Syam explains the truth behind Laplace's Box - it is the original Universal Century charter, which had an extra clause stating that people from the space colonies must be involved in the Earth Federation's future government affairs. However, the Federation erased the clause from the version they've been using since the destruction of Laplace in UC 0001. Syam explains that Mineva and Banagher were worthy of preserving the Box because the Republic of Zeon was going to lose its autonomy in four years' time. As Syam encourages Mineva to broadcast the information about the Box to the Earth Sphere, Full Frontal appears and asks Syam to give it to him. When Vist refuses, Full Frontal leaves in the Neo-Zeon mobile armor and intends to destroy the Box himself. The mobile armor easily disposes of the ECOAS forces in the area, as well as Gael (who barely manages to buy Banagher enough time to get back to the Unicorn). Banagher and Riddhe take on Full Frontal. As Frontal immobilizes Riddhe, he ensnares Banagher and they make a transcendent trip through time, witnessing various events throughout history (including scenes from the earlier Gundam series). Meanwhile, Bright Noa arrives at Cheyenne Base in North America and, under the guise of an inspection with Londo Bell, comes down to confront Martha Vist Carbine and the Federation leadership over the situation in space. He learns that the Federation is using the Titans' old Gryps II colony laser to destroy Industrial 7 and prevent the opening of Laplace's Box. Ronan Marcenas activates the superweapon over Bright's pleas, but is stunned to hear too late from Alberto Vist that Riddhe is in the line of fire. The Nahel Argama crew is alerted and leaves before the firing, which vaporizes the Neo-Zeon forces. After Full Frontal attempts to sway Banagher's judgement by showing him that the end of time is devoid of life, and that Newtypes cannot hope to change humans' propensity for war, Lalah Sune's spirit appears and tells Full Frontal that the glow of the Newtype phenomena warms the universe. Char Aznable's spirit partly appears and tells Full Frontal that the time has come to pass on, leaving Full Frontal's physical body dead, revealing that he had truly been a vessel for Char's spirit and ideology as he had stated before. As Banagher and Riddhe depart to protect Magellanica, Char, Lalah, and Amuro's spirits soar off into space together with Char saying that the future is up to those left behind. Banagher and Riddhe combine the power of the Unicorns' NT-D psychofield and stops the colony laser. Seeing Banagher taking the brunt of the laser and the beam starting to exceed his own abilities, the Banshee's Psycho-Frame turns green and the psychofield strengthens. However, the Unicorn begins to break apart. Hearing Marida's voice encourage him, Banagher's spirit separates from his body and crystals of Psycho-Frame expand to cover the Gundam. As the Gryps laser fades, the Federation base on Earth reports that Megallanica is still intact, accompanied by an enormous field of green light projecting from the crystalized Unicorn. Mineva addresses the Earth Sphere using Megallanica's massive communication field while Syam quietly passes away, having finally realized his redemption. Bright and the Londo Bell take away Martha Vist Carbine for questioning as Alberto asks her to let things go now that the Box was opened. Otto leads the Nahel Argama to protect the Megallanica, now controlled by Zimmerman. The Unicorn, glowing in various bright colors, suddenly flies off into the distance. Riddhe pursues in the Banshee, begging Banagher to return, but Banagher does not respond. Instead, the Unicorn produces a wave of light, which disables the pursuing Federation mobile suits. In Banagher's mind, he encounters the spirit of his father, who nods him in the direction of Mineva. Banagher finally awakens in the Unicorn, as it mysteriously repairs itself. He and Riddhe return to the Megallanica together. Episode 7's theme song is "StarRingChild" by Aimer

=== Mobile Suit Gundam Unicorn RE:0096 Episodes ===
No.	Title	Original release date	English air date
1	"Departure 0096"; Transliteration: "Kyūjūroku-nenme no Tabidachi" (Japanese: 96年目の出発)	April 3, 2016	January 8, 2017
Members of the Neo-Zeon group "The Sleeves" travel to Side 4's Industrial 7 colony to rendezvous with Cardeas Vist of the Vist Foundation and retrieve a mysterious item known as "Laplace's Box." Little do they know that Zeon Princess Mineva Lao Zabi has stowed away aboard the ship with the intent of meeting Vist on her own accord. Meanwhile, Anaheim Electronics Academy student Banagher Links detects Mineva's presence and commandeers a mobile worker to rescue her from falling through the colony's sky.
2	"First Blood"; Transliteration: "Saisho no Chi" (Japanese: 最初の血)	April 10, 2016	January 15, 2017
After being saved by Banagher, Mineva introduces herself as "Audrey Burne" and agrees to have him accompany her to the Vist Mansion on the edge of the colony. Meanwhile, the Sleeves engage in a skirmish with the Earth Federation's Londo Bell task force.
3	"They Called It Gundam"; Transliteration: "Sore wa Gandamu to Yobareta" (Japanese: それはガンダムと呼ばれた)	April 17, 2016	January 22, 2017
As the battle between the Sleeves and Londo Bell breaks through the colony, Cardeas attempts to escape arrest, but is shot by his own son Alberto. Banagher travels around the underground corridors of the Vist mansion and discovers the mortally wounded Cardeast and the experimental mobile suit Unicorn Gundam. With his dying breath, Cardeas reveals to Banagher that he is his father and entrusts the Gundam only to him. Banagher launches in the Unicorn Gundam to confront the Kshatriya, piloted by the Sleeves' elite pilot Marida Cruz.
4	"Full Frontal's Pursuit"; Transliteration: "Furu Furontaru Tsuigeki" (Japanese: フル・フロンタル追撃)	April 24, 2016	January 29, 2017
Shortly after driving the Sleeves away from Industrial 7, the Unicorn Gundam is recovered by the Londo Bell ship Nahel Argama. Upon regaining consciousness, Banagher is questioned by Daguza Mackle about how he came to possess the Unicorn Gundam but is interrupted by the Sleeves' surprise attack.
5	"Clash With The Red Comet"; Transliteration: "Gekitotsu: Akai Suisei" (Japanese: 激突・赤い彗星)	May 1, 2016	February 5, 2017
Full Frontal, the leader of the Sleeves, demands that the Nahel Argama hand over any items related to Laplace's Box, including the Unicorn. Daguza tries to ensure safe passage by exposing Audrey's identity as Mineva Lao Zabi and holding her hostage. Banagher sorties in the Unicorn against the Sinanju, but is blindsided by the Kshatriya before being taken to the Sleeves' asteroid base of Palau.
6	"Under the Mask"; Transliteration: "Sono Kamen no Shimo ni" (Japanese: その仮面の下に)	May 8, 2016	February 12, 2017
Banagher is brought to the Sleeves' base, where he meets Full Frontal. While in captivity, he is provided dinner by Gilboa Sant and his family. Meanwhile, the Federation's ECOAS task force stages a surgical strike on Palau to rescue Banagher.
7	"The Battle at Palau"; Transliteration: "Parao Kouryakusen" (Japanese: パラオ攻略戦)	May 15, 2016	February 19, 2017
The Earth Federation and ECOAS execute their assault on Palau as Banagher escapes with the Unicorn. He once again battles the Kshatriya until the NT-D system kicks in and defeats the Sleeves' mobile suit. Marida is captured and Alberto Vist is allowed to take her to an Anaheim Electronics facility on Earth. Meanwhile, Riddhe Marcenas springs Audrey from detention and they head to Earth to meet up with his father Ronan.
8	"Laplace, Where It All Began"; Transliteration: "Rapurasu, Hajimari no Chi" (Japanese: ラプラス, 始まりの地)	May 22, 2016	February 26, 2017
The Unicorn reveals the first clue to Laplace's Box as the ruins of the Laplace space station, which was destroyed by terrorists in U.C. 0001. However, Full Frontal and the Sleeves are not far behind.
9	"Retribution"; Transliteration: "Ritoribyūshon" (Japanese: リトリビューション)	May 29, 2016	March 5, 2017
Banagher and Daguza proceed to the remains of Laplace with the intention of activating Laplace's Box, but hear the original broadcast of the Earth Federation establishment ceremony. When Full Frontal and his Sinanju arrive, Daguza sacrifices his life to buy Banagher some time to activate the Unicorn's Destroy Mode. The fight sheds parts of the Laplace colony and sends them into the atmosphere. Banagher continues to pursue Full Frontal during the reentry, but a beam magnum shot meant for the Sinanju hits Gilboa instead. As Banagher enters the atmosphere, Audrey arrives at the Marcenas estate.
10	"From the Scorching Earth"; Transliteration: "Shakunetsu no Daichi kara" (Japanese: 灼熱の大地から)	June 5, 2016	March 12, 2017
Zeon Remnant forces attack the Federation's Capitol Building in Dakar in a feint operation to allow the Garencieres to safely descend to Earth. Banagher and the Unicorn Gundam are revealed to have been rescued by the Garencieres during re-entry, but he broods over the death of Gilboa by his hands. Meanwhile, Marida is transported to a Federation facility somewhere in North America, where Martha Vist Carbine manipulates her with the remains of a Qubeley mass-production unit, which she and other Ple clones piloted in the past. Audrey is held at the Marcenas estate, but she escapes captivity and stops by at a local diner, where she engages in an insightful conversation with the diner's elderly owner. Bright Noa is ordered to take Riddhe on board the Ra Cailum under his command, as well as capture the Garencieres.
11	"Battle at Torrington"; Transliteration: "Torinton Kōbō" (Japanese: トリントン攻防)	June 12, 2016	March 19, 2017
Following an encrypted message, Zeon Remnant forces from around the world band together for an all-out assault on Torrington Base in Australia, which is revealed to be the second clue to Laplace's Box. Loni Garvey, the Shamblo's pilot, falls victim to the malfunctioning on-board psycommu system, becoming a channel for her dead father's bloodlust and begins to indiscriminately massacre the civilian population, despite being ordered to avoid causing collateral damage. Banagher, appalled by the resulting destruction, confronts Zinnerman about his hypocritical rationalizing of the situation and flies out in the Unicorn Gundam to put a stop to Loni's rampage.
12	"A Private War"; Transliteration: "Kojin no Sensō" (Japanese: 個人の戦争)	June 26, 2016	March 26, 2017
After failing to reason with Loni, Banagher activates the Unicorn Gundam's NT-D System in a last-ditch effort to stop her without resorting to lethal force. Incensed by Banagher's refusal to kill Loni, Riddhe decides to take her down himself, much to Banagher's dismay, and orders him at gunpoint to hand over the Unicorn Gundam under Captain Bright's orders. As he threatens Banagher, the two witness a mysterious black-colored Unicorn Gundam being dropped into the battlefield.
13	"Banagher Links, Soldier"; Transliteration: "Senshi, Banāji Rinkusu" (Japanese: 戦士, バナージ・リンクス)	July 3, 2016	April 2, 2017
Attacked by the Banshee, Banagher and the Unicorn Gundam are captured and brought aboard the Ra Cailum. Riddhe is surprised to learn that Alberto is Banagher's older half-brother. Riddhe's father Ronan has handed Mineva over to Alberto's aunt Martha, who transfers her aboard the giant airlifter Garuda as a pawn to get Banagher to talk. With no avenue of escape, Banagher still continues to hide the new coordinates to Laplace's Box. Bright, the commander of Londo Bell, recognizes that Banagher has the same possibilities as previous generations of Gundam pilots and gives him encouragement. Via Kai Shiden, Bright contacts the Garencieres to plan a joint operation to rescue Mineva. As he makes plans to send the Nahel Argama to provide backup, he sends Banagher to the Garuda, where Mineva is being held.
14	"Clash of the Two Unicorns"; Transliteration: "Shitō, Ni-ki no Yunikōn" (Japanese: 死闘、二機のユニコーン)	July 17, 2016	April 9, 2017
The Garencieres launches an operation to rescue Mineva and Marida, and Alberto orders Marida to stop them. Banagher changes the Unicorn Gundam into Destroy Mode and confronts the Banshee. Meanwhile, Mineva has escaped Martha's hands, and rejects Riddhe's offer of help. Trusting that Banagher will catch her, she throws herself into the air. Just as Mineva hopes, Banagher saves her and takes her to the Garencieres, then heads back to the Garuda to rescue Marida and Zinnerman. Marida is controlled by her hatred of the Gundam, but Zinnerman's appearance disrupts her determination. In his anger, Riddhe reminds Marida that the Banshee is also a Gundam. She is ejected from the Banshee, and rescued by Zinnerman.
15	"Waiting in Space"; Transliteration: "Sora de Matsu Mono" (Japanese: 宇宙(そら)で待つもの)	July 24, 2016	April 16, 2017
With Banagher, Mineva, and the others aboard, the Garencieres takes off for space. It suffers engine trouble en route, but Banagher refuses to give up. As he struggles, the Unicorn Gundam is surrounded by a mysterious light, and its power brings the Garencieres safely to its rendezvous with the Nahel Argama. However, the Earth Federation Forces' General Staff Headquarters has decided to eliminate both vessels due to their connection to Laplace's Box. As Banagher and the others return to space, they are confronted by the Federation flagship General Revil. They are saved from this desperate predicament by Full Frontal and his Neo Zeon fleet. Having escaped the General Revil's pursuit thanks to the Sinanju's attack, the Nahel Argama is forced to form a join front with the Sleeves.
16	"The Side Co-Prosperity Sphere"; Transliteration: "Saido Kyōeiken" (Japanese: サイド共栄圏)	July 31, 2016	April 23, 2017
Now on the run from the Federation Forces, the Nahel Argama has taken the desperate step of forming a joint front with the Sleeves. Though his crew resist the idea, Otto orders them to allow Frontal aboard the ship, in an attempt to learn his true intentions. Mineva likewise asks Frontal what he would do if he obtained the Box, and he reveals his idea of forming a Side Co-Prosperity Sphere that would strengthen the economic ties between the Moon and the Sides, excluding Earth and weakening the Federation. The disappointed Mineva predicts that this would result in further tragedies, but nonetheless she tells Frontal that the final coordinates for Laplace's Box are at Industrial 7's Magallanica. Meanwhile, Riddhe has received the Banshee Norn from Alberto, and he sets off in pursuit of the Unicorn Gundam.
17	"Nahel Argama Recaptured"; Transliteration: "Dakkan! Neeru Āgama" (Japanese: 奪還! ネェル・アーガマ)	August 7, 2016	April 30, 2017
Banagher is despondent now that Full Frontal has learned the final coordinates to Laplace's Box. Marida encourages him, saying that his chance will come if he holds onto his dreams. Meanwhile, Takuya and a few others have secretly called in a Federation Forces patrol ship and are awaiting the opportunity for a counterattack, but they are discovered by Angelo. Taking them hostage, Angelo demands the destruction of the patrol ship, and Captain Otto decides to dissolve the joint front. As fierce fighting unfolds, Banagher confronts Frontal. Mineva also takes a stand against Frontal's plan for a Side Co-Prosperity Sphere, and is joined by Marida. Zinnerman orders Marida to surrender, but her determination overcomes Zinnerman's hatred. Driven back by Banagher and Marida, Frontal and his comrades escape from the Nahel Argama and head for the Box's final coordinates.
18	"Fateful Battle"; Transliteration: "Shukumei no Tatakai" (Japanese: 宿命の戦い)	August 14, 2016	May 7, 2017
The Nahel Argama crew and the Sleeves are now engaged in a race to acquire Laplace's Box at Industrial 7. Banagher and Audrey are stopped halfway by the Banshee Norn piloted by Riddhe. An injured Marida intervenes in the confrontation to allow Banagher and Audrey to proceed to their goal. Meanwhile, Bright learns from Kai Shiden that the Federation is planning to activate the Gryps 2 colony laser to destroy the Box, and the Ra Cailum rushes to the Cheyenne base to stop the operation.
19	"Another Cosmic Glow"; Transliteration: "Futatabi Hikaru Uchū" (Japanese: 再び光る宇宙)	August 21, 2016	May 14, 2017
The Unicorn Gundam is trapped in the Rozen Zulu's psycho-jammers while Riddhe is overwhelmed by a thought resonance phenomenon and destroys the Kshatriya Repaired, killing Marida in the process. Marida's last thoughts reach the crew of the Nahel Argama and the Unicorn Gundam, warning them of the imminent danger within the sector. Her death causes the Unicorn Gundam to emit psycho-waves beyond measurement and destroy the Rozen Zulu. Meanwhile, Bright enters the Cheyenne base to confront Martha and Ronan.
20	"Laplace's Box"; Transliteration: "Rapurasu no Hako" (Japanese: ラプラスの箱)	August 28, 2016	May 21, 2017
Banagher and Audrey arrive at Magallanica and meet Syam Vist, who reveals to them the truth about Laplace's Box. Having passed the tests given to him, Banagher is given the Box, but Full Frontal appears and claims it as its legitimate inheritor.
21	"To The World's End"; Transliteration: "Kono Yono Hate e" (Japanese: この世の果てへ)	September 4, 2016	June 4, 2017
After being rejected by Syam Vist, Full Frontal boards the Neo Zeong to acquire Laplace's Box by any means necessary. The Unicorn Gundam and Banshee Norn engage the mobile armor, but are quickly overwhelmed by its sheer firepower before Full Frontal sends Banagher's mind into the end of space and time. Meanwhile, Ronan approves the use of the Gryps 2 colony laser to destroy Laplace's Box, only to realize that Riddhe is within its firing range.
22	"Return"; Transliteration: "Kikan" (Japanese: 帰還)	September 11, 2016	June 11, 2017
As the Gryps 2 colony laser fires toward Magallanica, Banagher and Riddhe use their full potential in an attempt to stop its destructive force. Their combined psycho field successfully blocks the colony laser, but at the cost of Banagher being absorbed into the Unicorn Gundam. Audrey then reveals herself to the Earth sphere as Mineva Lao Zabi as she broadcasts her speech about Laplace's Box.
