= List of After War Gundam X episodes =

After War Gundam X is a 1996 Japanese mecha drama anime series and the seventh incarnation to Sunrise's long-running Gundam franchise. It is directed by Shinji Takamatsu and written by Hiroyuki Kawasaki. It aired on TV Asahi from April 5, to December 28, 1996. From episodes 1–26, the first opening theme is "DREAMS" by Romantic Mode while the ending theme from episodes 1–13 is "HUMAN TOUCH" by Warren Wiebe and the second ending theme from episodes 14–26 is a Japanese version of "HUMAN TOUCH" by re-kiss. From episodes 27–39, the second opening theme is "Resolution" by Romantic Mode while the third ending theme up to episode 38 is "Gin'iro Horizon" (銀色Horizon, Silver Horizon) by Satomi Nakase. For episode 39, "HUMAN TOUCH" is the ending theme. Episode titles are taken from quotes spoken by characters in the series.

== Episode list ==
No.	Title	Original release date
1	"Has the Moon Come Up?"; Transliteration: "Tsuki wa Deteiru ka?" (Japanese: 月は出ているか?)	April 5, 1996
Garrod Ran is hired to rescue a mysterious young girl, Tiffa Adill, from The Vultures. Garrod infiltrates their ship, the Freeden, and escapes with Tiffa. Noticing Tiffa's fearful reaction to those who hired him, Garrod takes Tiffa to a former Federation base and comes across a GX-9900 Gundam X. After battling the mysterious man, the Freeden arrives with two Gundams to recapture Tiffa.
2	"I'll Give You Power..."; Transliteration: "Anata ni, Chikara wo..." (Japanese: あなたに、力を...)	April 12, 1996
Garrod uses Tiffa to escape from the Gundams. Later, many Vultures surround and start battling him. The Freeden resumes its attack and mercenaries Witz Sou and Roybea Loy – in their GW-9800 Gundam Airmaster and GT-9600 Gundam Leopard – recapture Tiffa. When things are looking grim, with the help of Tiffa, Garrod reveals the GX's fearsome power.
3	"My Favorite Mount is Ferocious"; Transliteration: "Watashi no Aiba wa Kyōbō desu" (Japanese: 私の愛馬は凶暴です)	April 19, 1996
After firing the GX's weapon, Garrod is captured by the captain of the Freeden, Jamil Neate. Later, the Alternative Company's owner hires Shagia Frost to bring back Tiffa. When a skirmish between mobile suits draws near, the crew intervene to protect the Freeden from damage.
4	"This Operation is Time Critical!"; Transliteration: "Sakusen wa Ikkoku wo Arasou!" (Japanese: 作戦は一刻を争う！)	April 26, 1996
After Tiffa's condition worsens, Jamil orders a return to the Alternative Company for a cure but his crew questions his motives. After Jamil explains who he was and his intentions toward Tiffa, the crew agree to follow him, but Witz and Roybea decide to leave. Jamil asks for help from his fellow Vultures and makes a plan, but is betrayed by Olba, the mobile suit pilot they saved, who kidnaps Tiffa.
5	"You Will Pull the Trigger"; Transliteration: "Hikigane wa Omae ga Hike" (Japanese: 引き金はお前が引け)	May 3, 1996
Shagia Frost attempts to destroy the Vultures while his brother Olba delivers Tiffa to Von Alternative – but fails due to Garrod's intervention with the GX. Olba returns to the battlefield to join Shagia and attempt to capture the GX, but Garrod is saved by Witz and Roybea in their Gundams. While Von Alternative tries to get rid of everybody with his long-range MA-06 Grandeene, Tiffa awakens and with the help of Jamil and Garrod, fires the Satellite Cannon to destroy the Grandeene.
6	"I Don't Believe This..."; Transliteration: "Fuyukai dawa..." (Japanese: 不愉快だわ...)	May 10, 1996
Garrod joins The Freeden but has difficulty with the crew. Meanwhile a Vulture named Ennil El sets her eyes on the GX and tries to capture it when Garrod leaves on his own. Garrod battles Ennil at an old nuclear power plant that is going critical. After Ennil withdraws, Jamil arrives in a mobile suit to warn Garrod to flee but they are both caught in the explosion.
7	"I'm Selling This Gundam!"; Transliteration: "Gandamu, Uru yo!" (Japanese: ガンダム、売るよ！)	May 17, 1996
Jamil is badly injured and the crew blame Garrod. While Ennil's comrades look for the Freeden, they find Witz's gold only for him to appear to recover it. Garrod flees from the Freeden, auctions the GX and sells it to Ennil, not knowing who she is.
8	"I Won't Forgive That Child!"; Transliteration: "Ano Ko, Yurusanai!" (Japanese: あの子、許さない！)	May 24, 1996
Witz is able to escape the siege of Zakoot Dattonel's forces that wanted his gold, thanks to an unknown plane. While Garrod is in the city, he is pursued and almost killed by a Vulture, but is saved by the Frost brothers who tell Garrod to continue piloting the GX. Meanwhile, Ennil attacks the Freeden to provoke Garrod, determined to be his enemy.
9	"Like the Rain Falling on the City"; Transliteration: "Chimata ni Ame no Furu Gotoku" (Japanese: 巷に雨の降るごとく)	May 31, 1996
After Garrod arrives, the Freeden escapes and moves into a lake where Zakoot is waiting to siege it again. The Frost brothers finish with the Vultures and go to the lake and continue fighting Wiz and Roybea while Garrod fights Ennil. Jamil tells his crew to back away and signals the GX for a plan. The Frost brothers retreat and as soon as the moon appears, a microwave beam is sent down to Earth, which hits the lake, creating an explosion that destroys the lake and Zakoot's ship. The vaporized water rises up to the clouds, condenses, and falls as rain.
10	"I Am a Newtype"; Transliteration: "Boku ga Nyūtaipu da" (Japanese: 僕がニュータイプだ)	June 7, 1996
In the northern territory of North America, a speech is given by Nomoa Long and Carris Nautilus – the leader of Fort Severn and his subordinate Newtype. The Freeden heads to Fort Severn to meet the Newtype but are ambushed by Carris in his RMSN-008 Bertigo. The GX battles Bertigo but is quickly defeated due to Garrod's inexperience and Carris's ability as a Newtype.
11	"Don't Think, Just Run!"; Transliteration: "Nani mo Kangaezu ni Hashire!" (Japanese: 何も考えずに走れ!)	June 14, 1996
Tiffa surrenders herself to Carris in exchange of Garrod's life. Kid Salsamille begins repairing the Gundams and Jamil takes Garrod to a frozen lake. Later, the Frost brothers attack the Freeden to destroy their Gundams, but are stopped by Garrod's upgraded GX-9900-DV Gundam X Divider.
12	"This is My Finest Masterpiece"; Transliteration: "Watashi no Saikō Kessaku desu" (Japanese: 私の最高傑作です)	June 21, 1996
Garrod's upgraded Gundam X defeats the Frost brothers and Shagia is badly injured. Garrod secretly enters the base at Fort Severn, where he sees Ennil talking with Nomoa Long; he learns that Carris is an Artificial Newtype, that Nomoa was Professor Dorat, a scientist for the Space Revolutionary Army. Garrod is soon discovered and runs into Carris and Tiffa. Meanwhile, the Freeden is attacked by Olba, who seeks to avenge his brother.
13	"Shoot My Foolish Self"; Transliteration: "Oroka na Boku wo Ute" (Japanese: 愚かな僕を撃て)	June 28, 1996
Garrod escapes with Tiffa. He sees Jamil piloting the GX to easily defeat Carris's Bertigo. Carris retreats and later confronts Nomoa. He goes to the Freeden and loses a battle with Garrod.
14	"Can You Hear My Voice!"; Transliteration: "Ore no Koe ga Kikoeru ka!" (Japanese: 俺の声が聞こえるか！)	July 5, 1996
The Bertigo is taken into the Freeden and Carris is given medical aid, but later is caught by Ennil and returned to Fort Severn. Nomoa activates the Patulia using Carris's Newtype abilities to destroy the city. When the Freeden notices the big mobile armor above the city, the Gundams are dispatched but the overwhelming power of the Patulia don't let them get near it. Jamil sets off in the rebuilt Bertigo with Tiffa and, aided by Wiz and Roybea, clear a path for Garrod to stop the mobile armor and rescue Carris. At the end, Carris decides to stay in the city to rebuild it.
15	"I Wonder If There Is a Heaven"; Transliteration: "Tengoku nante Aru no kana" (Japanese: 天国なんてあるのかな)	July 12, 1996
Witz and Roybea take a day off. Witz goes to visit his family while Roybea visits his past lovers.
16	"Because I Am Also Human"; Transliteration: "Watashi mo Hito dakara" (Japanese: 私も人間だから)	July 19, 1996
The crew of the Freeden take a break at the beach. Meanwhile, Tiffa senses that something is calling her and goes offshore, pursued by the crew. When Garrod and Wiz reach Tiffa's boat, they see Orc ships approaching. Garrod tries to battle underwater, and is aided by dolphins that help him escape missiles. Later at night, Garrod watches astonished as the beam from the satellite system is fired.
17	"You Must Find Out for Yourself"; Transliteration: "Anata Jishin ga Tashikamete" (Japanese: あなた自身が確かめて)	July 26, 1996
Deciding to investigate the beam's target, the team learn of a white dolphin with special power like a Newtype. The Freeden resupply offshore and learn about the D-Navi System being use by Doza Bale, so they decide to save the white dolphin. Doza Bale's fleet engages the Freeden, Garrod battles underwater, and Wiz fights alongside Garrod. In the battle, the white dolphin saves Garrod and Wiz, and destroys Doza Bale's fleet – while Roybea is able to join and assist.
18	"The Sea of Lorelei"; Transliteration: "Rōrerai no Umi" (Japanese: Loreleiの海)	August 2, 1996
On a recovery mission in the Sea of Lorelei, Olba Frost and Orc submarine captain Marcus Guy find a mysterious woman sealed in a container on the ocean floor. Olba contacts Shagia for information, and while the brothers consider it, the submarine encounters the Freeden. Led by Tiffa, the Freeden comes under attack by the Orc submarine and its mobile suits, the Gundams holding out until Olba enters the battle in his Gundam. Captured by the massive scissor-claws of the Ashtaron, Garrod is helpless in its grasp until all the mobile suits mysteriously lose power. On the bridge of the Freeden, Tiffa introduces herself to Jamil as Lucille Liliant.
19	"It's As If I'm Dreaming"; Transliteration: "Marude Yume wo Miteru Mitai" (Japanese: まるで夢を見てるみたい)	August 9, 1996
Free of the Ashtaron and the mysterious power, Garrod lands a crippling blow to the Orc submarine, forcing it to surface and withdraw along with Olba. Returning to the Freeden, he learns that Tiffa has become possessed by a Newtype: the mysterious woman on the Orc ship and the former instructor of Jamil Neate. She reveals what happened to her 15 years ago, shortly before the end of the war, and the crew agree to help Jamil free her from her capsule on the Orc ship. Garrod gives control of the Gundam X Divider to Jamil, allowing Jamil to lead the rescue. After defeating the Orc mobile suits, causing enough damage to force them to abandon their submarine, the Gundam pilots of the Freeden are faced with a large unknown force that appear over the horizon.
20	"...So We Meet Again"; Transliteration: "...Mata Aeta wa ne" (Japanese: ...また逢えたわね)	August 16, 1996
After being out at sea for a month, the Freeden arrives at the Saints Island to resupply. While out shopping, Toniya runs into Ennil El, the two unaware of who the other person is. At dinner, Ennil reveals she is considering giving up being a mobile suit rider and marry her boyfriend, Miles. Toniya invites Ennil to join the crew before Miles arrives and reveals that Toniya is a crewmate of the Freeden; hearing this, Ennil runs off and purchases a mobile armor with the intent of attacking the Freeden, but retreats when Toniya reaches out to her.
21	"Like My Late Wife Always Said"; Transliteration: "Shinda Nyōbō no Kuchiguse da" (Japanese: 死んだ女房の口癖だ)	August 23, 1996
The Freeden returns to sea and begins searching the area where Garrod saw the moonbeam come down. Unknown to the Freeden, the target of the moonbeam is Zonder Epta, an old UNE munitions plant that is being used by the New UNE to develop new mobile suits, led by Aimzat. The Frost Brothers lead a squad of new Balient mobile suits to capture the Freeden while a ground force led by Katokk Alzamille infiltrates the ship. The Freeden manages to repel the infiltration team and captures Katokk.
22	"A Fifteen-Year-Old Ghost"; Transliteration: "Jūgonen-me no Bōrei" (Japanese: 15年目の亡霊)	August 30, 1996
Looking for a place to rest, Ennil arrives at Zonder Epta and spots the New UNE's new mobile suit: the Gundam Double X. She flees the island and is pursued by the Frost Brothers, who destroy her mobile armor though she manages to survive and is rescued by the Freeden. The New UNE launches another attack on the Freeden, with Katokk managing to escape his cell and forces the Freeden into the firing range of the Double X's Twin Satellite Cannon. Jamil surrenders after learning the Double X is being powered by the Gundam X he piloted during the 7th Space War and the Freeden crew is taken to Zonder Epta, where they are held as prisoners.
23	"My Dreams Are Reality"; Transliteration: "Watashi no Yume wa Genjitsu desu" (Japanese: 私の夢は現実です)	September 6, 1996
Jamil and Tiffa are separated from the rest of the Freeden crew to be studied at the New UNE's Newtype Labs. Meanwhile, the rest of the crew plan their escape from Zonder Epta. However, they are betrayed by Ennil, who warns Aimzat about the escape plan.
24	"Double X, Activate!"; Transliteration: "Daburu Ekkusu Kidō!" (Japanese: ダブルエックス機動！)	September 13, 1996
Garrod and Katokk manage to infiltrate Aimzat's ship that Jamil and Tiffa are being held on and reach the Double X. Jamil and Tiffa recover the GX's controller to activate the Double X while Katokk sacrifices himself so Garrod can make it to the Double X. Garrod manages to steal the Double X and escapes with Jamil and Tiffa and reunites with the rest of the crew, including Ennil, who have escaped Zonder Epta and recovered the Freeden. Having outlived his usefulness, the Frost Brothers execute Aimzat as Garrod uses the Double X's Twin Satellite Cannon to destroy Zonder Epta. Meanwhile, the New United Nations Earth announces itself to the world.
25	"You Are Our Stars of Hope"; Transliteration: "Kimitachi wa Kibō no Hoshi da" (Japanese: 君達は希望の星だ)	September 20, 1996
Running low on supplies, the Freeden arrives in the Asian country of Estard, an independent nation formed after the 7th Space War, who opposes the New UNE. The Freeden agrees to help the Estardoan government fight back against the New UNE forces and destroy a nearby airbase. With help from the neighboring nations of Gastar and Northerbell, the allied forces manage to destroy the airbase, though Witz's Gundam Airmaster is heavily damaged during the battle.
26	"Don't Say Anything"; Transliteration: "Nani mo Shaberuna" (Japanese: 何も喋るな)	September 27, 1996
Ennil leaves the Freeden and sets out for Saints Island. Estard's military leader, General Lee, helps repear the Freeden and upgrade Witz's Gundam Airmaster. The New UNE invades Northerbell's capital city with the Frost Brothers using the battle to see if any of their soldiers awaken as a Newtype and destroy the Double X. Garrod manages to defeat the Frost Brothers' soldier, Demar Griffe, but the New UNE manages to take the city and Northerbell falls. Meanwhile, not wanting to get involved in a war, Roybea leaves the Freeden.
27	"It Is Time for Farewell"; Transliteration: "Osaraba de Gozaimasu" (Japanese: おさらばで御座います)	October 5, 1996
With the fall of Northerbell, Gastar signs a treaty with the New UNE. Fearing Gastar might resume an ethnic war from the past, Estard agrees to sign a treaty with the New UNE as well. However, General Lee, wanting to go out fighting, acts on his own to attack New UNE forces gathering at Estard's border. Garrod and Witz head out in their Gundams to try and stop him, but they are intercepted by the Frost Brothers' next soldier, Duett Langraph. The two manage to defeat Langraph but reach the border just as General Lee is killed. Ennil returns to Saints Island to discover it has been taken over by the New UNE and every government official, including Miles, has been executed.
28	"I've Got to Shoot!?"; Transliteration: "Utsu shika nai no ka!" (Japanese: 撃つしかないのか！)	October 12, 1996
Roybea discovers that the woman he has been staying with, Yurina, is part of a rebel group fighting against the New UNE. Yurina is killed by New UNE soldiers and Roybea returns to the Freeden as it's fleeing Estard, to find the ship under attack by the Frost Brothers' next soldier, who is using the mobile suit Gable that can deflect beam weapons. Roybea and his Gundam Leopard manage to destroy the destroy the beam deflectors, allowing Garrod, Witz, and Jamil to destroy the Gable, though the Leopard is heavily damaged.
29	"Look At Me"; Transliteration: "Watashi o Mite" (Japanese: 私を見て)	October 19, 1996
The Freeden begins its search for the Newtype Labs, however Tiffa's abilities start to weaken as Garrod has become more focused on his pilot duties, leaving her feeling lonely. The ship is attacked by the Frost Brothers' fourth soldier, Abel Bauer, who has shown Newtype potential in the past. Abel fully awakens during his battle with Garrod and Witz, accessing a squad of remote-controlled bit mobile suits through the Flash System. With help from Tiffa, Garrod manages to destroy the Flash System and drive off Abel; while making repairs to his mobile suit, Abel is killed by Shagia. Meanwhile, Ennil arrives at Saints Island and launches an attack on the New UNE forces stationed there.
30	"I Felt That I'd Never See You Again"; Transliteration: "Mō Aenai Ki ga Shite" (Japanese: もう逢えない気がして)	October 26, 1996
With all their potential Newtype soldiers dead, the Frost Brothers launch the next phase of their plan. The Freeden arrives at the Newtype Labs and Jamil is allowed in without any resistance, with both sides unaware they are walking into a trap set by the Frost Brothers. Nicola Fafas, a researcher at the labs and spy for the Space Revolutionary Army (SRA), boards the Freeden and kidnaps Tiffa, taking her into space.
31	"Fly, Garrod!"; Transliteration: "Tobe, Garōdo!" (Japanese: 飛べ、ガロード！)	November 2, 1996
Ennil returns to the Freeden, telling the crew of an old UNE base that has been seized by the SRA that would allow Garrod into space to rescue Tiffa. The ship arrives at the base just before the New UNE arrives to reclaim the base. The Freeden is sacrificed to allow the shuttle carrying Garrod and other Earth defecters to launch into space. Tiffa and Nicola arrive at the space colony Cloud 9.
32	"That's the G-Falcon!"; Transliteration: "Are wa G-Farukon!" (Japanese: あれはG-ファルコン！)	November 9, 1996
Seidel Rasso, leader of the SRA, orders the shuttle carrying Garrod and the Double X to take a detour to a military colony, fearing Garrod may be a New UNE spy. Garrod manages to escape the shuttle with the Double X, but is attacked by a squad of SRA mobile suits led by Lancerow Dawell, Jamil's old rival from the 7th Space War. The Double X is nearly destroyed, but is saved by the sudden appearance of the G-Falcon support fighter.
33	"How Did You Know Who I Am!?"; Transliteration: "Dōshite Ore wo Shitteiru!?" (Japanese: どうして俺を知っている！？)	November 16, 1996
Garrod and the Double X are taken to the asteroid base of Satyricon, a rebel group fighting against the SRA. Garrod agrees to join the group in exchange for repairs to the Double X and partners with Pala Sys, the G-Falcon's pilot. The SRA launch an assault on the base and wipe it out, though Garrod and Pala manage to escape the destruction due to a warning from Lancerow.
34	"There's the Moon!"; Transliteration: "Tsuki ga Mieta!" (Japanese: 月が見えた！)	November 23, 1996
Garrod and Pala continue Satyricon's mission to take out the SRA's colony laser, a large weapon the SRA intends to use to take control of the Earth in a single strike. The SRA formally declares war against the New UNE, as Lancerow, Seidel, and Tiffa arrive at the colony laser. Garrod and Pala rescue Tiffa then destroy the colony laser. As the three teens attempt to return to Earth they are attacked by a large New UNE force led by the Frost Brothers.
35	"The Light of Hope Will Not Be Extinguished"; Transliteration: "Kibō no Hikari wa Kesanai" (Japanese: 希望の灯は消さない)	November 30, 1996
Garrod, Tiffa, and Pala are captured by the Frost Brothers and taken to Earth. Garrod and Tiffa meet with Fixx Bloodman, the leader of the New UNE. Tiffa uses her Newtype abilities to discover a word hidden inside Bloodman: D.O.M.E., the same word that was hidden inside Seidel. Elsewhere, the Freeden crew are about to be executed while en route to a New UNE labor camp, but are saved by Carris who has also retrieved the Gundams.
36	"The War We Wanted"; Transliteration: "Bokura ga Motometa Sensō da" (Japanese: 僕らが求めた戦争だ)	December 7, 1996
Garrod, Tiffa, and Pala retrieve the Double X and G-Falcon and escape from the New UNE, regrouping with Carris and the Freeden crew. The group land at a base in New Orleans that is the HQ for the North American Resistance Force and prepare to make their next move. Following a general assembly, the Frost Brothers shoot down a plane carrying most of the New UNE's top officials as the officials are opposed to another war with the SRA. The New UNE then mobilizes its forces and launches into space.
37	"Freeden, Launch!"; Transliteration: "Furīden Hasshin Seyo" (Japanese: フリーデン発進せよ)	December 14, 1996
The SRA forces mobilize, with Bloodman and Seidel both headed to the Moon to access D.O.M.E. The SRA forces arrive at the moonbase first, but are attacked by an automated defense system and bit mobile suits with Bloodman and the New UNE arriving shortly later. Tiffa has a vision of the moonbase and believes it is the key to quickly ending the war. Carris joins the Freeden crew on a new space battleship, dubbed the Freeden II, with the ship launching into space.
38	"I Am D.O.M.E... I Was Once Called a Newtype"; Transliteration: "Watashi wa Dōmu... Katsute Nyūtaipu to Yobareta Mono" (Japanese: 私はD.O.M.E... かつてニュータイプと呼ばれた者)	December 21, 1996
The Freeden II arrives at the battlefield in space, with both the SRA and New UNE turning their focus onto the ship's mobile suit team. Garrod and Tiffa manage to break through and land on the Moon in the Double X. Through Tiffa's Newtype powers, the bit mobile suits guide and escort the Freeden II, Lancerow, Bloodman, and Seidel to the D.O.M.E. facility, which is being controlled by the consciousness of the first known Newtype.
39	"The Moon Will Always Be There"; Transliteration: "Tsuki wa Itsumo Soko ni Aru" (Japanese: 月はいつもそこにある)	December 28, 1996
D.O.M.E. reveals the truth about Newtypes to everyone present while Bloodman's security team overrides the Flash System, allowing the Frost Brothers to manually access their own Satellite Cannon. As the Freeden II and the ships carrying Bloodman and Seidel depart the Moon, the Frost Brothers use their own Satellite Cannon to destroy Bloodman and Seidel's ships. The brothers try to charge another shot, but Garrod's Double X manages to override the Flash System before the brothers' Gundams can fully charge and fires at Shagia and Olba at the same time they fire. The Satellite Cannons from the Ashatron/Virsago and Double X clash, destroying the three Gundams along with the moonbase, the Flash System, and D.O.M.E., ending the war. Six months later, the crew of the Freeden II have gone their separate ways while peace talks between the New UNE, now led by Jamil and Sala, and the SRA, now led by Lancerow, continue.
