= List of Gundam video games =

Gundam
- Developers: Banpresto; BEC; B.B. Studio
- Publishers: Bandai; Banpresto; Bandai Namco Entertainment
- Platform: Platforms: Arcade, FM-7, FM Towns, MSX, PC-88, PC-98, Sharp X1, X68000, Windows, MacOS, Bandai RX-78, Playdia, Apple Bandai Pippin, WonderSwan, Nintendo Entertainment System, Super Nintendo Entertainment System, GameCube, Wii, Nintendo Switch, Game Boy, Virtual Boy, Game Boy Advance, Nintendo DS, Nintendo 3DS, PlayStation, PlayStation 2, PlayStation 3, PlayStation 4, PlayStation 5, PlayStation Portable, PlayStation Vita, Android, iOS, Game Gear, Sega Saturn, Dreamcast, Xbox 360, Xbox One, Xbox Series X/S
- First release: Kidou Senshi Gundam Part 1: Gundam Daishi ni Tatsu; December 1983
- Latest release: Gundam Seed Battle Destiny Remastered; May 21, 2025

The popularity of the Japanese anime metaseries Gundam since its release in 1979 has resulted in a spread of merchandise across various forms, with video games among them. This is a list of video games that are set in the franchise's various timelines, and are segregated by the console systems they were released for. There are around 250 games, and by March 2004, the series had sold over 20 million units.

For the grid-based tactics games, see the SD Gundam G Generation games list.

== Arcade ==
- Mobile Suit Gundam (1993)
- Mobile Suit Gundam: Final Shooting
- Mobile Suit Gundam: EX Revue
- Mobile Suit Gundam 0079: Card Builder
- Mobile Suit Gundam 0083: Card Builder
- Mobile Suit Gundam U.C. Card Builder
- Mobile Suit Gundam: Spirits of Zeon – Dual Stars of Carnage
- Mobile Suit Gundam: Spirits of Zeon – Memory of Soldier
- Mobile Suit Gundam: Battle Operating Simulator
- Mobile Suit Gundam VS Series
  - Mobile Suit Gundam: Federation vs. Zeon
  - Mobile Suit Gundam: Federation vs. Zeon DX
  - Mobile Suit Z Gundam: A.E.U.G. vs. Titans
  - Mobile Suit Z Gundam: A.E.U.G. vs. Titans DX
  - Mobile Suit Gundam SEED: Rengou vs. Z.A.F.T.
  - Mobile Suit Gundam SEED Destiny: Rengou vs. Z.A.F.T. II
  - Mobile Suit Gundam: Gundam vs. Gundam
  - Mobile Suit Gundam: Gundam vs. Gundam Next
  - Mobile Suit Gundam: Extreme Vs.
  - Mobile Suit Gundam: Extreme Vs. Full Boost
  - Mobile Suit Gundam: Extreme Vs. Maxi Boost
  - Mobile Suit Gundam: Extreme Vs. Maxi Boost ON
  - Mobile Suit Gundam: Extreme Vs. 2
  - Mobile Suit Gundam: Extreme Vs. 2 XBoost
  - Mobile Suit Gundam: Extreme Vs. 2 OverBoost
  - Mobile Suit Gundam: Extreme Vs. 2 Infinite Boost
- Quiz Mobile Suit Gundam: Monsenshi
- SD Gundam Neo Battling
- SD Gundam Psycho Salamander no Kyoui
- SD Gundam Sangokushi Rainbow Tairiku Senki
- Gundam P.O.D. Series
  - Mobile Suit Gundam: Bonds of the Battlefield
  - Mobile Suit Gundam: Bonds of the Battlefield II
- Mobile Suit Gundam: Try Age (2011)

== Fujitsu ==
=== FM-7 ===
- Kidou Senshi Gundam Part 1: Gundam Daishi ni Tatsu
- Kidou Senshi Gundam Part 2: Tobe Gundam

=== FM Towns ===
- Mobile Suit Gundam: Hyper Classic Operation
- Mobile Suit Gundam: Hyper Desert Operation

== MSX ==
- Mobile Suit Gundam: Last Shooting
- MS Field: Kidou Senshi Gundam
- MS Field Kidou Senshi Gundam Plus Kit
- MS Field Kidou Senshi Gundam Plus Kit Tsuki

== NEC ==
=== PC-88 ===
- Kidou Senshi Gundam Part 1: Gundam Daishi ni Tatsu
- Kidou Senshi Gundam Part 2: Tobe Gundam

=== PC-98 ===
- Kidou Senshi Gundam Part 1: Gundam Daishi ni Tatsu
- Mobile Suit Gundam: Return of Zeon
- Mobile Suit Gundam: A Year of War
- Mobile Suit Gundam: Advanced Operation
- Mobile Suit Gundam: Multiple Operation
- Mobile Suit Gundam 0083: Stardust Operation
- MS Field: Mobile Suit Gundam
- MS Field 2 '92: Mobile Suit Gundam

== Sharp ==
=== Sharp X1 ===
- Kidou Senshi Gundam Part 1: Gundam Daishi ni Tatsu
- Kidou Senshi Gundam Part 2: Tobe Gundam

=== Sharp X68000 ===
- Mobile Suit Gundam: Classic Operation
- Mobile Suit Gundam: Classic Operation – Original Scenario Disk

== PC ==
- Gundam Evolution – Service terminated
- Gundam Network Operation
- Gundam Network Operation 2
- Gundam Network Operation 3
- Gundam Storm (Browser-Based) – Service terminated
- Mobile Suit Gundam 0079: The War For Earth – 1996 interactive movie collaboration between Bandai and Presto Studios Inc. Also released for Macintosh, PlayStation (JP release only) and Pippin.
- Mobile Suit Gundam Battle Operation 2
- Mobile Suit Gundam Online
- New Gundam Breaker
- SD Gundam Capsule Fighter Online
- SD Gundam G Generation Cross Rays
- Universal Century Gundam Online
- SD Gundam Battle Alliance
- Gundam Breaker 4
- Mobile Suit Gundam SEED Battle Destiny Remastered

== Bandai ==
=== Arcadia ===
- Mobile Suit Gundam

=== Bandai RX-78 ===
- Gundam – Luna II no Tatakai

=== Playdia ===
- SD Gundam Daizukan

=== Apple Bandai Pippin ===
- Gundam Tactics Mobility Fleet 0079

=== WonderSwan ===
- Mobile Suit Gundam: MSVS
- SD Gundam G Generation: Gather Beat
- SD Gundam: Emotional Jam

=== WonderSwan Color ===
- SD Gundam G Generation: Gather Beat 2
- SD Gundam G Generation: Monoeye Gundams
- Mobile Suit Gundam SEED
- Gundam Strike Force Go !!!: Stairway to the Destined Victory: Worldwide Edition
- SD Gundam: Operation U.C.

== Nintendo ==
=== Family Computer ===
- Mobile Suit Z Gundam: Hot Scramble
- SD Gundam Gaiden: Knight Gundam Monogatari
- SD Gundam Gaiden: Knight Gundam Monogatari 2
- SD Gundam Gaiden: Knight Gundam Monogatari 3
- SD Gundam World Gachapon Senshi – Scramble Wars
- SD Gundam World Gachapon Senshi 2 – Capsule Senki
- SD Gundam World Gachapon Senshi 3 – Eiyû Senki
- SD Gundam World Gachapon Senshi 4 – New Type Story
- SD Gundam World Gachapon Senshi 5 – Battle of Universal Century
- SD Gundam: Gundam Wars

=== Super Famicom ===
- Mobile Suit Gundam: Cross Dimension 0079 – Tactical role-playing game
- Mobile Suit Zeta Gundam: Away to the Newtype – Tactical role-playing game
- Mobile Suit Gundam F91: Formula Wars 0122
- Mobile Suit Victory Gundam – 2D action game
- Mobile Fighter G Gundam – 2D fighting game
- Shin Kidō Senki Gundam Wing: Endless Duel – 2D fighting game
- SD Gundam: G Next – Turn-based strategy
- SD Gundam: GX – Turn-based strategy
- SD Gundam Gaiden: Knight Gundam Monogatari – Ooinaru Isan – Japanese role playing game
- SD Gundam Gaiden 2: Entaku no Kishi – Japanese role playing game
- SD Gundam Generation – Tactical role-playing game
- SD Gundam: Power Formation Puzzle – Puzzle games
- SD Gundam: V Sakusen Shidō – Shoot 'em up with Run and gun stages
- SD Gundam 2 – Shoot 'em up with Run and gun stages
- Super Gachapon World: SD Gundam X – Turn-based strategy
- SD the Great Battle – top-down platforming shoot 'em up, part of the Compati Hero series also featuring Ultraman and Kamen Rider characters
- Battle Soccer: Field no Hasha – Soccer game, part of the Compati Hero series also featuring Ultraman and Kamen Rider characters, this game also features Godzilla characters
- Battle Racers – kart racer, part of the Compati Hero series also featuring Ultraman and Kamen Rider characters

=== GameCube ===
- Mobile Suit Gundam: The Ace Pilot
- Mobile Suit Gundam: Gundam vs. Zeta Gundam (Only in Japan)
- SD Gundam Gashapon Wars – Collaboration with Nintendo

=== Wii ===
- Mobile Suit Gundam: MS Sensen 0079
- SD Gundam G Generation Wars
- SD Gundam G Generation World
- SD Gundam: Scad Hammers
- SD Gundam Gashapon Wars

=== Nintendo Switch ===
- SD Gundam G Generation Genesis
- SD Gundam G Generation Cross Rays
- SD Gundam Battle Alliance
- Mobile Suit Gundam SEED Battle Destiny Remastered
- Gundam Breaker 4

=== Game Boy ===
- SD Gundam G-Arms
- SD Gundam Gaiden: Lacroan Heroes
- SD Gundam: SD Sengokuden – Kuni Nusiri Monogatari
- SD Gundam: SD Sengokuden 2 – Tenka Touitsuhen
- SD Gundam: SD Sengokuden 3 – Chijou Saikyouhen'
- Shin SD Gundam Gaiden

=== Virtual Boy ===
- SD Gundam Dimension War

=== Game Boy Advance ===
- SD Gundam G Generation Advance
- Mobile Suit Gundam SEED: Tomo to Kimi to koko de
- Mobile Suit Gundam SEED: Battle Assault
- Mobile Suit Gundam SEED: Destiny
- SD Gundam Force

=== Nintendo DS ===
- SD Gundam G Generation DS
- SD Gundam G Generation: Cross Drive
- Mobile Suit Gundam 00
- Emblem of Gundam
- SD Gundam Sangokuden DS

=== Nintendo 3DS ===
- SD Gundam G Generation 3D
- Gundam the 3D Battle
- Gundam Try Age SP

== Sony ==
=== PlayStation ===
- Mobile Suit Gundam (1995)
- Mobile Suit Gundam v.2.0 (1996)
- Mobile Suit Gundam 0079: The War For Earth (1997)
- Mobile Suit Gundam: Perfect One Year War
- Mobile Suit Z-Gundam
- Mobile Suit Gundam: Char's Counterattack (1998)
- Mobile Suit Gundam: Giren's Greed, Blood of Zeon
- SD Gundam G Century
- SD Gundam G Generation
- SD Gundam G Generation Zero
- SD Gundam G Generation F
- SD Gundam G Generation F-IF
- Gundam: Battle Assault
- Gundam: Battle Assault 2
- Kidou Butouden G Gundam: The Battle
- Shin Kidou Senki Gundam W: The Battle

=== PlayStation 2 ===
- Mobile Suit Gundam: Gihren's Ambition
- Giren no Yabou: Zeon Dokuritsu Sensouden – Kouryaku Shireisho
- Mobile Suit Gundam: Journey to Jaburo
- Mobile Suit Gundam: Zeonic Front
- Mobile Suit Gundam: Lost War Chronicles
- Mobile Suit Gundam: Encounters in Space
- Mobile Suit Gundam: The One Year War
- Mobile Suit Gundam: Climax U.C.
- SD Gundam G Generation Neo
- SD Gundam G Generation SEED
- SD Gundam G Generation Spirits
- SD Gundam G Generation Wars
- Mobile Suit Gundam SEED
- Mobile Suit Gundam SEED: Never Ending Tomorrow
- Mobile Suit Gundam SEED Destiny: Generation of C.E.
- Battle Assault 3 Featuring Gundam SEED
- Mobile Suit Gundam: Federation vs. Zeon
- Mobile Suit Gundam Z: AEUG vs. Titans
- Mobile Suit Gundam: Gundam vs. Zeta Gundam
- Gundam Seed: Rengou vs. Z.A.F.T.
- Mobile Suit Gundam Seed Destiny: Rengou vs. Z.A.F.T. II
- Mobile Suit Gundam 00: Gundam Meisters
- MS Saga: A New Dawn
- G-Saviour
- SD Gundam Force: Showdown!
- Dynasty Warriors: Gundam
- Dynasty Warriors: Gundam 2

=== PlayStation 3 ===
- Mobile Suit Gundam: Crossfire (a.k.a. Mobile Suit Gundam: Target in Sight)
- Mobile Suit Gundam Battlefield Record U.C. 0081
- Mobile Suit Gundam: Side Stories – combines the plot of six games released for Sega Saturn, Dreamcast and PlayStation 2, and includes two new campaigns that connect all included stories together with Gundam Unicorn. (Not a compilation or collection of games)
- Mobile Suit Gundam Unicorn
- Dynasty Warriors: Gundam
- Dynasty Warriors: Gundam 2
- Dynasty Warriors: Gundam 3
- Dynasty Warriors Gundam Reborn
- Mobile Suit Gundam: Extreme Vs.
- Mobile Suit Gundam: Extreme Vs. Full Boost
- Mobile Suit Gundam Extreme Vs. Full Boost Premium G Sound
- Gundam Breaker
- Gundam Breaker 2
- Gundam Battle Operation
- Gundam Battle Operation Next
- Super Hero Generation – tactical role-playing game, part of the Compati Hero series also featuring Ultraman and Kamen Rider characters

=== PlayStation 4 ===
- SD Gundam G Generation Genesis
- SD Gundam G Generation Cross Rays
- Gundam Breaker 3
- New Gundam Breaker
- Gundam Versus
- Gundam Battle Operation Next (no physical release)
- Mobile Suit Gundam: Battle Operation 2 (no physical release)
- Mobile Suit Gundam Extreme VS. Maxiboost On
- Mobile Suit Gundam Battle Operation Code Fairy (no physical release)
- SD Gundam Battle Alliance
- Gundam Evolution (no physical release)
- Gundam Breaker 4

=== PlayStation 5 ===
- Mobile Suit Gundam Battle Operation Code Fairy
- SD Gundam Battle Alliance
- Gundam Evolution
- Gundam Breaker 4
- Gundam Rogue Orbit

=== PlayStation Portable ===
- Gundam Battle Tactics
- Gundam Battle Royale
- Gundam Battle Chronicle
- Gundam Battle Universe
- Gundam Assault Survive
- SD Gundam G Generation Portable
- SD Gundam G Generation World
- SD Gundam G Generation Overworld
- Mobile Suit Gundam: Giren no Yabou – Axis no Kyoui
- Mobile Suit Gundam SEED: Alliance vs. Z.A.F.T. Portable
- Mobile Suit Gundam: Gundam vs. Gundam
- Mobile Suit Gundam: Gundam vs. Gundam NEXT PLUS
- Mobile Suit Gundam: Senjou no Kizuna Portable
- Mobile Suit Gundam: Mokuba no Kiseki
- Gundam Memories: Tatakai no Kioku
- Mobile Suit Gundam AGE: Universe Accel
- Mobile Suit Gundam AGE: Cosmic Drive
- Great Battle Fullblast – Beat'em up, part of the Compati Hero series also featuring Ultraman and Kamen Rider characters

=== PlayStation Vita ===
- SD Gundam G Generation Genesis
- Kidō Senshi Gundam SEED Battle Destiny
- Gundam Breaker
- Gundam Breaker 2
- Gundam Breaker 3
- Mobile Suit Gundam Extreme Vs Force
- Mobile Suit Gundam: Battle Fortress
- Gundam Conquest V
- Dynasty Warriors Gundam Reborn
- 3rd Super Robot Wars Z Zigokuhen
- Super Hero Generation – tactical role-playing game, part of the Compati Hero series also featuring Ultraman and Kamen Rider characters

== Sega ==
=== Game Gear ===
- SD Gundam: Winner's History

=== Sega Saturn ===
- Mobile Suit Gundam
- Mobile Suit Z Gundam: Kouhen
- Mobile Suit Z Gundam: Zenpen
- Mobile Suit Gundam: Gihren's Greed
- Mobile Suit Gundam Side Story I: Senritsu no Burū
- Mobile Suit Gundam Side Story II: Ao wo Uketsugu Mono
- Mobile Suit Gundam Side Story III: Sabakareshi Mono
- SD Gundam G Century S

=== Dreamcast ===
- Gundam Side Story 0079: Rise from the Ashes
- Mobile Suit Gundam Gihren's Greed – Blood of Zeon
- Mobile Suit Gundam: Federation Vs. Zeon DX
- Gundam Battle Online

== Microsoft ==
=== Xbox 360 ===
- Mobile Suit Gundam: Operation Troy
- Dynasty Warriors: Gundam
- Dynasty Warriors: Gundam 2
- Dynasty Warriors: Gundam 3

=== Xbox One ===
- SD Gundam Battle Alliance
- Gundam Evolution

=== Xbox Series X/S ===
- SD Gundam Battle Alliance
- Gundam Evolution
- Gundam Rogue Orbit

== Mobile phone ==
- Mobile Suit Gundam Phase-Act Part 1
- Mobile Suit Gundam Phase-Act Part 2
- Mobile Suit Gundam Card Battle Part 1
- Mobile Suit Gundam Card Battle Part 2
- Mobile Suit Gundam SEED Destiny ~Stardust Battlefield~
- Mobile Suit Zeta Gundam III ～The heartbeat of the Stars is Love～
- Mobile Suit Gundam U.C. 0079
- Mobile Suit Gundam Meisters
- Mobile Suit Gundam Tactics
- Mobile Suit Gundam Online
- Mobile Suit Gundam Online Advance
- Mobile Suit Gundam U.C. RPG
- Super Gundam Royale
- Gundam Masters
- Gundam Area Wars
- Gundam Card Collection
- Gundam Card Battler
- Gundam Conquest
- Gundam Kingdom
- Gundam Spirits
- Gundam Breaker Mobile
- Mobile Suit Gundam U.C. Engage
- Mobile Suit Gundam Iron-Blooded Orphans G
- SD Gundam G Generation ETERNAL
