= Kira Yamato =

- Mobile Suit Gundam SEED, Mobile Suit Gundam SEED Destiny character
- Kira Yamato in Gundam SEED
- First appearance: Mobile Suit Gundam SEED episode 1
- Voiced by: Japanese; Sōichirō Hoshi; English; Matt Hill (Ocean dub); Max Mittelman (NYAV dub)

In-universe information
- Family: Haruma Yamato (uncle/adoptive father); Caridad Yamato (aunt/adoptive mother); Cagalli Yula Athha (twin sister)
- Genetic type: Coordinator

Kira Yamato (Japanese: キラ・ヤマト) is a fictional character first introduced as the protagonist from the 2002 Japanese anime television series Mobile Suit Gundam SEED, which was produced by Sunrise as part of the Gundam franchise. In the series, Kira is a first-generation Coordinator, a genetically enhanced human being born of normal humans (Naturals). At the beginning of Gundam SEED, Kira lives on the neutral space colony Heliopolis to avoid the war between the Coordinators and the Naturals, but the colony becomes involved in the war shortly thereafter. Kira is the only person within the Earth Alliance—the Naturals' military faction—who is able to effectively pilot their mobile suit—a type of a mecha created by them. He is forced to become a mobile suit pilot and to participate in various battles to protect his friends. Kira has also been featured in Gundam SEED's direct sequel, Mobile Suit Gundam SEED Destiny, in which he fights to stop a new war between the races' military organizations and the 2024 film Mobile Suit Gundam SEED Freedom as a Compass Commander dealing with a group known as Blue Cosmos.

Kira has also appeared in the manga adaptations from the two TV series as well as the film compilations. Various video games from the Gundam franchise as well as crossover games also feature Kira as a pilot from mobile suits. Director Mitsuo Fukuda regarded Kira's actions as based on Japanese people's thoughts, and emphasized a large development occurring to his character across the series. He is voiced in the Japanese series by Sōichirō Hoshi. In English, he is voiced by Matt Hill in the Ocean English dub, and by Max Mittelman in the NYAV English dub.

Kira is one of the most popular characters in the Anime Grand Prix popularity polls for favorite male characters, often coming in first or second between 2002 and 2005. His character has also been well received by publications for manga, anime and other media due to his friendly personality, the constant struggles he has with his enemies that allow him to have a notable development. In regards to his return in SEED Destiny, reviewers found him more likable than the new lead, Shinn Asuka, and found his characterization deeper. His romantic relationship with Lacus Clyne has also been praised by critics due to how well written it is.

== Appearances ==
=== In Mobile Suit Gundam SEED ===
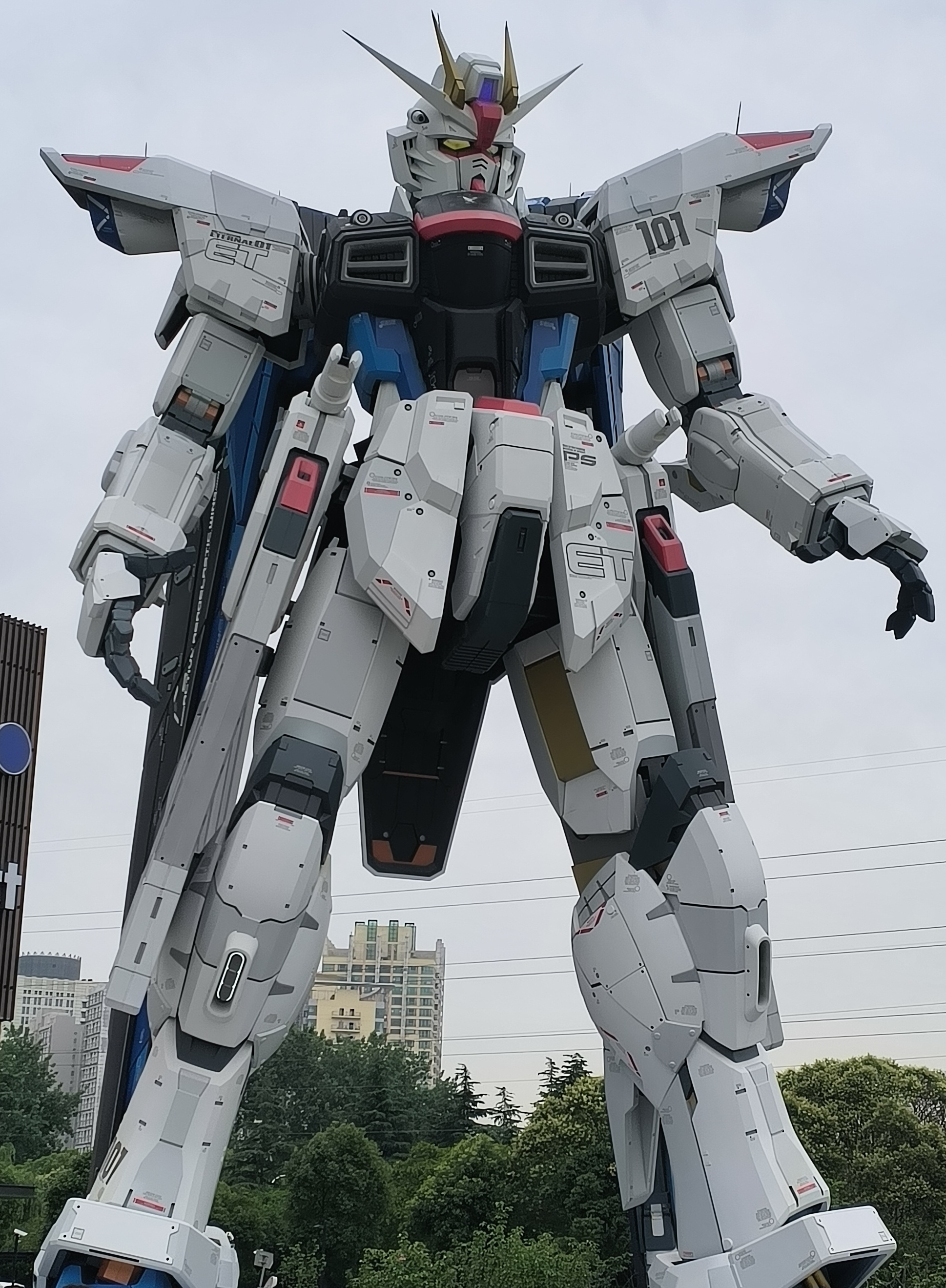
A replica of Kira's Freedom mobile suit.

At the start of Mobile Suit Gundam SEED, Kira is a shy, friendly teenager living peacefully in the Heliopolis colony. Kira is a highly skilled computer programmer who assists with research and development at the Heliopolis technical college, where he is a student. When a war between the Naturals and Coordinators is brought to Heliopolis, Kira takes control of a mobile suit, the GAT-X105 Strike (GAT-X105 ストライク), to protect his friends from ZAFT—the military organization of the Coordinators. Born as a Coordinator, Kira's advanced mental and physical skills allow him to skillfully control the Strike. Kira is shocked when he discovers that his childhood friend Athrun Zala is a member of ZAFT. When they last met, Athrun gave Kira his robotic pet Birdy (トリィ, Torī) (voiced by Naomi Shindou in the Japanese anime and Tabitha St. Germain in the English dub) as a sign of their enduring friendship, which Kira is often seen with.

Several survivors from Heliopolis are brought on board the Archangel and Kira defends them from enemy attacks until they arrive in Alaska on Earth. Kira has strong reservations against fighting, fearing he may confront Athrun and that he may kill a person. After manipulation by Flay Allster, Kira gradually becomes more aggressive when defending the Archangel to the point where he could kill a person without hesitation. During one of the Archangel's battles against ZAFT, the Strike suffers multiple damages by Athrun and Kira is declared missing in action. He is found alive but injured by Reverend Malchio, who transports him to a space colony known as PLANT where most coordinators reside and is ZAFT's homebase. There, his wounds are treated by Lacus Clyne, a Coordinator who befriended Kira when she was taken aboard the Archangel and was used as a hostage.

After hearing that ZAFT plans to attack the base his friends are staying at, Kira decides to continue battling to bring the war to an end. Lacus then gives Kira ZAFT's new mobile suit, ZGMF-X10A Freedom (ZGMF-X10A フリーダム), which he uses to accompany the Archangel, whose objective has also changed to ending the war. When piloting Freedom Kira is noted to avoid hitting enemy mobile suits' cockpits to reduce the number of human casualties. Kira joins the Archangel and Lacus' faction to fight both the Earth Alliance and ZAFT to stop both sides from destroying each other.

Kira learns of his origins from ZAFT commander Rau Le Creuset during these battles. Kira is the Ultimate Coordinator; his fetus was artificially developed outside his mother's womb and his genetic enhancements were intended to be superior to all other Coordinators. Kira was the only fetus to survive the process. He was born as the twin brother of his comrade Cagalli Yula Athha but does not learn about this relationship until the latter half of the series. Kira was adopted by his aunt Caridad and uncle Haruma Yamato and was led to believe they were his biological parents. Despite being shocked by his origins as the Ultimate Coordinator, Kira continues to fight alongside the Archangel until their opponents, including Rau, have been defeated and the war comes to end.

=== In Mobile Suit Gundam SEED Destiny ===
During Mobile Suit Gundam SEED Destiny, Kira has been living in the secluded Marshall Islands since the end of the war within the country of Orb. He and Lacus have spent the past two years since the end of the war assisting Reverend Malchio and Kira's adoptive mother with their orphanage. When an incident triggers another war, Coordinators try to kill Lacus; Kira pilots Freedom to defeat them. When Orb attempts to join the war as a member of the Earth Alliance, Kira and the Archangel intervene Orb's forces to preserve the nation's neutral status. Kira suspects Gilbert Durandal, the chairman of the PLANT colonies and leader of ZAFT, to be behind Lacus' attempted murder, but his motives are questioned by Athrun who is working in ZAFT. Later, when the Archangel becomes a target of the ZAFT ship known as Minerva, Kira is defeated and the Freedom is destroyed by pilot Shinn Asuka. Lacus gives Kira an upgraded version of Freedom, ZGMF-X20A Strike Freedom (ZGMF-X20A ストライクフリーダム), so he can continue fighting. Having obtained a weapon of mass destruction, Durandal imposes the Destiny Plan, a rule which removes freewill and dictates a person's entire life based on their genetics. Kira, the Archangel and their allies confront ZAFT's forces in space and defeat them in the final battle. Kira personally confronts Durandal and the latter is killed by one of his own subordinates. Kira appears in the original video animation (OVA) Mobile Suit Gundam SEED Destiny Final Plus. Following Durandal's death, Kira meets Shinn and they promise to work for a peaceful future. He is also featured in films Mobile Suit Gundam SEED Destiny: Special Edition, which retell the events from the television series and adds a scene of Kira becoming a member of ZAFT after the war ends.

=== In Mobile Suit Gundam SEED Freedom ===
In Mobile Suit Gundam SEED Freedom (set 1 year after the end of Destiny), Kira has moved to the PLANTs with Lacus, and became the supreme commander of a peacekeeping organization called COMPASS alongside Shinn, and other comrades from his past with the Earth Alliance, Orb and some ZAFT personnel like the Minerva crew and the PLANT Intelligence Division. At the beginning of the film, he pilots a new mobile suit, the STTS-909 Rising Freedom (STTS-909 ライジングフリーダムガンダム), which he uses to fight for Compass. However, Orphee Lam Tao from the Kingdom of Foundation becomes jealous of Kira and Lacus' relationship and has a subordinate use his Accord telepathy to manipulate Kira as he crosses into Eurasia's territory unknowingly and is attacked in retaliation under Lacus' orders. The Freedom is destroyed by the Black Knights serving Orphee Lam Tao but Kira manages to escape. Unaware of Lacus' actions, believing that she has betrayed him, Kira breaks down but is supported by Athrun to search for her in order to understand the truth. An assault team led by Kira infiltrates Foundation's base in the Artemis asteroid and rescues Lacus, as both declare their unconditional love for each other. Kira is then given his old Strike Freedom to face the Black Knights in battle again, most importantly Orphee and Ingrid's own mobile suit. Although Kira is overwhelmed in combat, Lacus aids him by the providing the MDE262S Proud Defender, to become the ZGMF/A-262PD-P Mighty Strike Freedom Gundam. Lacus arrives and assists Kira in destroying all of the Foundation's mobile suits and ships. After defeating Orphee and Ingrid with Freedom's giant sword, the war ends and Kira and Lacus descend to Earth on a beach, where they undress and share a kiss in the sunset.

=== In other media ===
Kira is featured in the manga adaptations of Gundam SEED and Gundam SEED Destiny. Kira's designs, according to Masatsugu Iwase—author of the Gundam SEED manga—was intended to be that of "a spineless wimp while not making him look too childish", but he later decided to make him a strong character in the manga. The manga Mobile Suit Gundam SEED: The Edge Desire features a story about Kira's recovery following Freedom's destruction.

The manga series Mobile Suit Gundam SEED Astray explores Kira's survival after the Strike's defeat; a technician named Lowe Guele finds Kira wounded and takes him to Reverend Malchio. Although Kira appears only at the end, his defeat is the objective of Mobile Suit Gundam SEED X Astray's protagonist, Canard Pars. In Mobile Suit Gundam SEED C.E. 73 Δ Astray Kira makes a brief appearance; he kidnaps Cagalli from Orb during the events of Gundam SEED Destiny. He has also been featured in two character CDs from the series, with tracks performed by his Japanese voice actor, Sōichirō Hoshi.

Kira has also appeared in various video games in the Gundam franchise, including Gundam Seed: Rengou vs. Z.A.F.T. and its sequel Mobile Suit Gundam Seed Destiny: Rengou vs. Z.A.F.T. II. He is the main playable character in the mobile phone game Mobile Suit Gundam SEED Phase-Act Delivery. He appears in the Gundam fighting crossover games Dynasty Warriors: Gundam 2 and Dynasty Warriors: Gundam 3 with Strike Freedom as a playable mobile suit. Other Gundam crossover games also feature Kira as a pilot including Gundam vs. Gundam Next and Mobile Suit Gundam: Extreme Vs.. Another crossover game in which he is playable is Gundam Assault Survive, piloting the Strike. Kira, along with other Gundam SEED characters, appears in several video games from the Super Robot Wars series. He appears in Another Century's Episode 3 piloting the Freedom mobile suit and its follow-up, Another Century's Episode R, with the Strike Freedom.

== Creation and conception ==
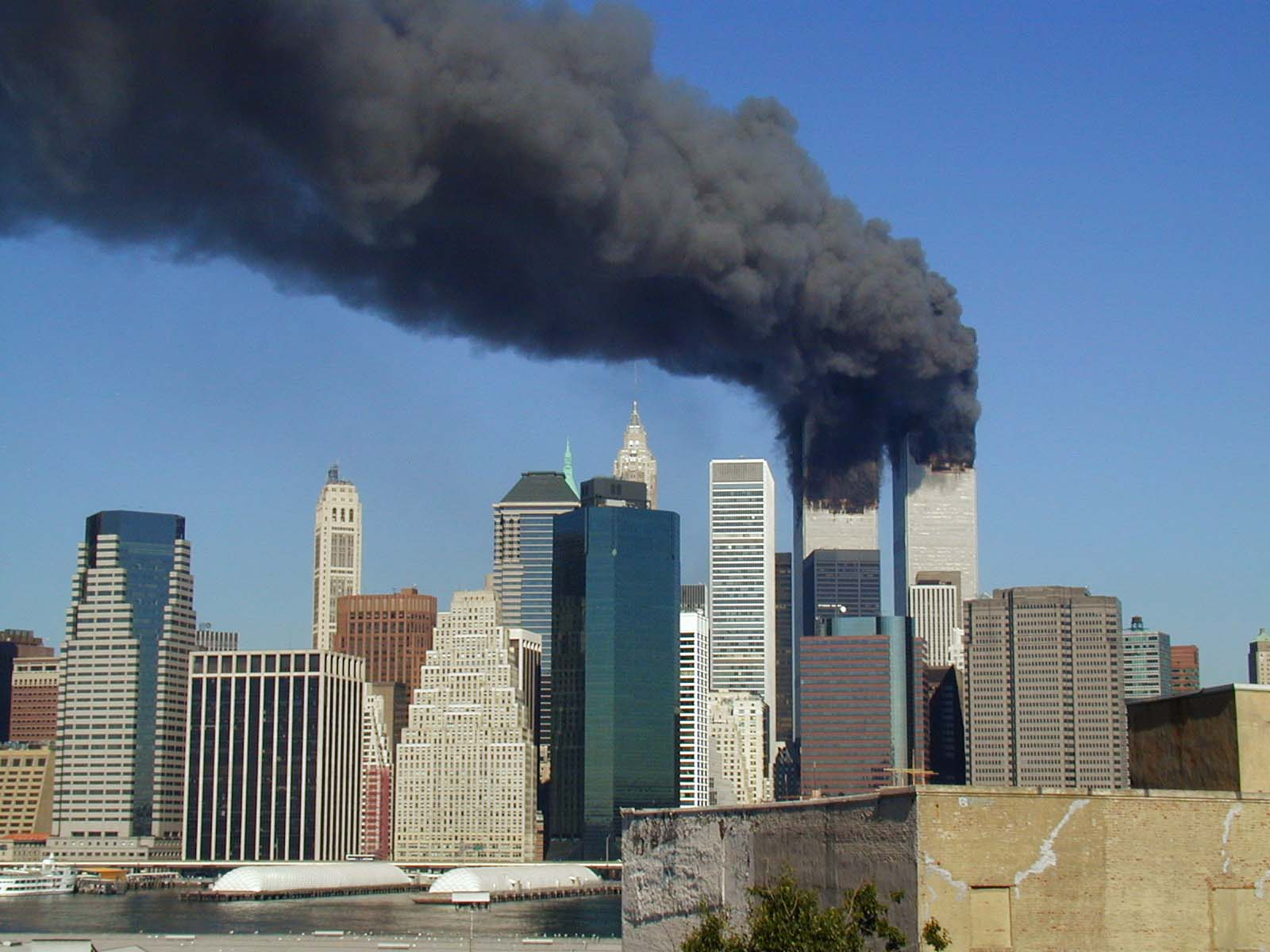
The theme of war was influenced by the terrorist attacks from 2001 and how Kira becomes a pacifist in response to it.

Director Mitsuo Fukuda stated that initially the story of Gundam SEED was written from Kira's point of view. When the series started development, Fukuda noticed the world was in chaos as a result of the September 11 attacks. This influenced the themes of Gundam SEED featuring anti-war movement themes through the pacifist Kira Yamato; Fukuda based him on the concept of an Islamic soldier fighting in the US military.

Kira's personality and thought process were derived from what Fukuda considered to be Japanese people's thoughts. He said that his story was about his forced wish to fight, in contrast to Shinn Asuka who was not reluctant to fight in Mobile Suit Gundam SEED Destiny. In retrospective, Fukuda emphasized a contrast between both Kira's and Shinn's characters to the point both were the opposite of each other regarding their opinions; Kira's development was easier to script. Fukuda said that as both Kira's and Shinn's characters as were similar, they were easy to voice. The setting in which the mechanics that appear are powered by electricity was influenced by Gear Fighter Dendoh which Fukuda previously directed, and when it came to handling the Gundam, he focused on its aspect as a symbol of the character piloting it. Fukuda recalls having enjoyed the scene from episode 46 based on the emotional support Lacus provides to Kira. Ishida agreed with Fukuda, stating the scene was well directed. For the final episode of the series, Fukuda aimed to bring Kira to his lowest where he becomes unstable when Flay is killed by Rau, leaving a major impact in him, considering himself a failure for failing to protect her. When it came to this scene in both retelling films and HD remaster of the series, Fukuda wanted the original audio to remain the same as he feared adding a song or changing the background music would have ruined it. Following Rau's death at Kira's hand in the final episode of the series, Fukuda wanted the last scene involving Kira being outside Freedom in space while being rescued by Athrun and Cagalli to change for the remaster for adding a more symbolic tone.

Kira's inclusion in Destiny was made in order to tell a story from three people's point of views: Kira's, Athrun's and Shinn. Kira's quite characterization was the made in order to reflect his trauma in regards to the fights he had in the first Seed series. In contrast to the stronger Kira from Seed who managed to "devours" other characters, the Kira from Destiny was written to lack emotion with the exception of the moments he becomes romantic with Lacus. This was also done to avoid having Kira overshadow Athrun's arc again. Another challenge for the director involved the handling of Kira's skills when piloting the Freedom and then create a new mobile suit. The director lamented that from the three protagonists, Kira was the least explored character during the making of the series alongside two other characters with major importance: Durandal and Lacus. As Kira was quite an active character in SEED, Fukuda undeniably labelled him as the protagonist. In contrast, he was more quiet in Destiny, leading to the decision to Athrun and Cagalli being more fitting of being the protagonists. This is more notable in Destiny compilation movies where Athrun acts as the main narrator. Fukuda described Kira in SEED Destiny as a person who runs away from fights despite often his values for Orb. His characterization was made to change briefly across the story as Kira faced Gilbert Durandal's ideals and became a person more compromised with war in contrast to his original pacifist persona after this incarnation was challenged multiple other characters in regards to his actions in the battlefield.

With a new film being released several years after the end of Destiny, Fukuda decided to use Kira as the main character, resulting in the subtitle Freedom. Freedom which serves as one of the main themes of the trilogy and contrasted Gilbert Durandal's Destiny Plan used in the climax of the previous series. Fukuda reflected such series left unfinished drama to the protagonists of Kira, Athrun and Shinn and thus wanted to explore such possibilities with Freedom. During the course of the movie, Kira is direct to Lacus about his love for her. In an interview following the release of the movie, Mitsuo Fukuda revealed that in regards to the script he made the decision to have Kira be direct to Lacus about his love for her as he felt the time was right for him to express how he felt for Lacus in words in addition to actions.

Fukuda recounts that his wife, late writer Chiaki Morosawa, wanted a character punch Kira due to lack of violence outside mobile suit fights as well as sink the Archangel. Morowasa did not believe that the story could end properly this happened alongside to the destruction of the Archangel ship. Regarding the reason for choosing a motorcycle as the vehicle for the two of them rather than a four-wheeled car for marketing Kira and Lacus' hobbies, Fukuda said, cars feel like they move on a single axis or in a flat manner, but motorcycles also have roll movements, so it's more free-flowing. This fits Kira and Lacus, as it symbolizes the freedom that they crave. Fukuda was inspired by his own youth to animate bikes as he relates them with superheroes like Bari Bari Densetsu. Though not major in the movie, the bikes Kira and Lacus ride together were hard to animate but Fukuda still personally drew scene. In regards to how they work, the Gold Wing that Kira is riding is a reciprocating engine. Promotions also included a collaboration with Dune: Part Two in the form of an alternate version of Dune: Part Two's movie poster featuring Lacus and Kira in place of Chani (Zendaya) and Paul Atreides (Timothée Chalamet) respectively.

=== Casting ===
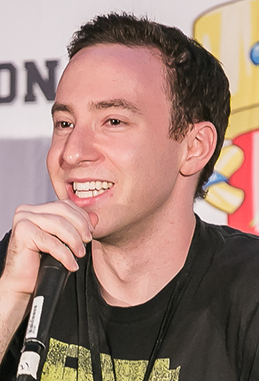
Max Mittelman voices Kira in English

Fukuda had initial mixed feelings about the portrayal of Kira since he believed him and the famous voice actor were regularly seen in Japanese anime. However, Fukuda was attracted by Soichiro Hoshi's popularity and decided to contact him for Seed. Akira Ishida was also pictured to be Kira's actor but then Fukuda decided to pick Athrun Zala instead. Since Hoshi was one of the youngest voice actors in Seed, Fukuda often contacted him about how to properly portrayal; He often told Hoshi that Kira is constantly in a state of sadness in the first episodes as he was going to lose his humanity the more he fought. Hoshi said that the character of Kira was the one who left him the biggest attention in his career. The first half of the anime ended with a meeting between Kira and Athrun were the two act casually as they had to avoid being enemies. In the end, Fukuda praised Hoshi for bringing Kira's charm. Hoshi believed Kira managed to mature thanks to Lacus Clyne after his fight with Athrun.

Hoshi expressed joy in voicing the character and was happy when redoing his character's lines for the remaster of the series. One of Hoshi's favorite lines in the franchise is "I still have a world I want to protect!" in the final episode of SEED when facing Rau as he felt it was heartwarming. Another aspect Hoshi enjoyed in regards to his work was how Kira and Athrun become allies in the 39th episode following multiple fights across the anime. In retrospect, Hoshi claims there was brief tension in recording early episodes and was often assisted by Fukuda. Although Kira and Athrun often face each other, Hoshi found no difficulties in voicing their scenes as he often believed the two would reform their friendship with Athrun's voice actor Akira Ishida agreeing.

For the English dub, he is voiced by Matt Hill, who got the role thanks to a friend from the dub's director, who told Hill not to have too much energy when doing the voice. The line "Kira Yamato! Launching!" was repeated by Hill several times when obtaining the role. Hill remembers enjoying his work, having taken a liking to the character. Max Mittelman replaced Hill for the NYAV dub.

== Reception ==
=== Popularity ===
Kira's character has been well received by anime viewers, appearing various times in the Anime Grand Prix popularity polls for the favorite male characters category. He ranked first in 2002, second in 2003 and 2004, first in 2005, and second in 2006. In a NHK poll, he was voted as the fourth best Gundam character. In a 2012 poll, Kira's line "There are still people I want to protect" (それでも、守りたい世界があるんだ！) was voted by fans as the best line in Gundam SEED.

In a Newtype poll, Kira was voted the second most popular male anime character from the 2000s. In another poll focused on all of the characters in the Gundam franchise, Kira was voted the most popular. In a poll organized by Sunrise to find the best couple in the Gundam franchise, Kira and Lacus were second, and in another regarding the best team-ups between former enemies, Kira and Athrun were second. In another poll from the same site that asked fans which character would they would want to meet, Kira was the most popular. Kira was most popular in two other polls which asked readers who the most memorable characters from Gundam SEED and from Gundam SEED Destiny were. Kira, along with five other notable mecha and pilots from the Gundam series, was recognized in the second set of "Anime Heroes and Heroines" stamps, released in Japan in 2005. In 2017, Kira was voted as the best Gundam main character.

In a Animage poll, Kira reached the top of popularity polls 30 times, which is the second highest in history. The number of TOP 10 ranks is 77 times, ranking fourth all time.

In a Animedia poll, Kira was the most popular male character of the year, 1st place in 2007, 2nd place in 2008 and 2009 and 3rd place in 2010 and 2014 and 2018. In 2011 and 2012, it ranked fourth.

In a Gundam Ace poll, Kira was in the most popular Gundam character poll conducted from 2005 to 2007, claimed the first place 12 times out of the 36 total polls. And then, he was ranked in the TOP 3 for many years with Amuro and Char.

In the 2007 Seiyu Awards, Sōichirō Hoshi was a nominee in the category "Best Actors in supporting roles" for his portrayal as Kira in the Gundam SEED Destiny OVA, but lost to Akira Ishida and Kōki Miyata. Kira was also voted as the second best character voiced by Hoshi.

In July 2021, a replica of the Freedom was unveiled in Shanghai together with a concert by T.M.Revolution. Kira and Lacus' images were shown during this concert.

=== Critical response ===
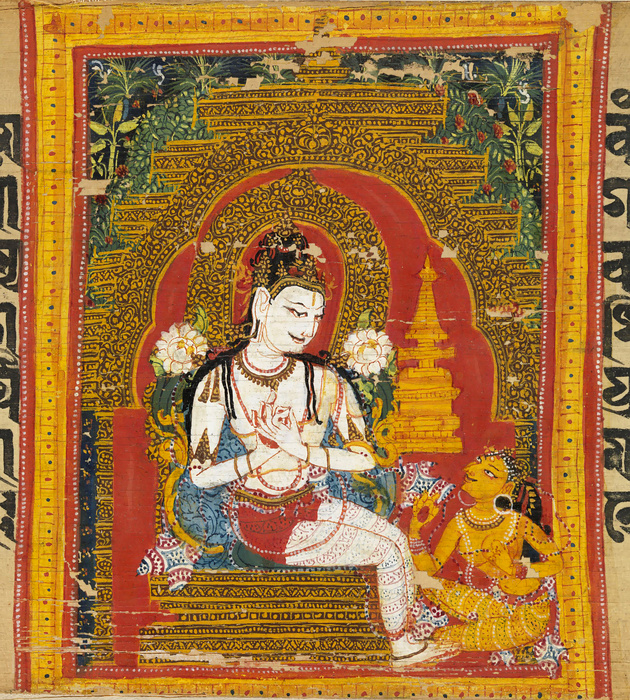
Kira's characterization in the Destiny finale was compared to that of a Mahayana Buddhism

Manga and anime publications have commented on Kira's character, and he received mainly positive critical responses. IGN's Andy Patrizio said Kira's character was likable and the only problem he found was how he often repeated Athrun Zala's name in early episodes. THEM Anime Reviews' Derrick L. Tucker said he was one of the strongest characters from the series; Tucker also said he was likable despite his angsty displays. Tucker also compared him with Amuro Ray from the first Gundam series, Mobile Suit Gundam, finding both likeable. Chris Beveridge from Mania Entertainment liked Kira's handling of the mobile suits and his ability to reprogram them, finding it as a new concept in the Gundam franchise.

Also writing for Mania Entertainment, Kim Wolstenholme was worried about how much Kira's and Athrun's relationship would be focused in Gundam SEED, but liked that Lacus Clyne's introduction added tension to it. Ever Cheung from Animefringe who wondered about the future of Kira and Lacus because the two are about to embrace in the anime's opening sequence. He said, "If that's real, this story may be more interesting than I thought ..." Ross Liversidge from UK Anime Network enjoyed Kira's and Athrun's rivalry which resulted in well-done fight scenes from each of their mobile suits as well as intense drama due to how originally the two were friends. Liversidge praised the development from such rivalry as the two started hating each other and their battle. DVDTalk writer Don Houston considered Kira to be similar to other anime protagonists because he fights for peace and not glory, labeling him the "reluctant hero", but still praised his character arc in the series without overshadowing other character like Athrun and Cagalli. Due to the origins regarding Kira's original nature and his connections with Rau, UK Anime Network expected to see an intense final battle but was sightly disappointed despite enjoying Kira's anger displayed in the finale when engaging his enemy.

Besides SEED's television series, Kira's actions in the compilation films were commented. Due to the compilation films not carefully adapting the television series, both Anime News Network and the Fandom Post feel like Kira's struggle to keep up with his philosophy of not killing and his relationship with Athrun do not work in this format and thus only returning fans might enjoy the movies. While still praising the narrative originally provided in Kira's premise, IGN disliked how the game Locked and Rocked failed to portray Kira accurately as a result of lacking enough dialogue. In 2021, UK Anime Network writer Ross Locksley stated that despite several criticism the Western audience tends to give Kira to the point of calling him a Mary Sue, he still viewed Kira as an outstanding anime character due to his formal and caring demeanor which contrasts stereotypes as well as his constant team ups with Mu la Flaga in the first SEED to protect the Archangel from ZAFT forces.

Reviewers have also commented on Kira's role in the sequel Gundam SEED Destiny. Initial reviews mentioned his lack of appearances during the first episodes and whether the new characters could be as appealing as him. He was expected to return in the series to fight the new lead character Shinn Asuka. While writing an article for later episodes, Liversidge found Kira's actions more appealing than Shinn's, and was looking forward to them. DVDTalk.com shared similar feelings and stated Kira's return to the battlefield appears to be a theme "key players from the previous series are forced into positions they aren't happy with" something he felt was the focus of Kira's group. Luis Cruz from Mania Entertainment found that Kira's character expansion developed depth, pointing to one of Kira's discussions with Athrun about the relation between people's dreams and conflicts. HobbyConsolas praised Kira's characterization and his relationship with Lacus as an appealing couple due to their mutual caring in SEED Destiny as well their actions in the plot. Despite finding flaws within the narrative, Mania liked how Kira is forced to drop his pacifist methods on Stella leading to her death resulting into an appealing conflict between him and Shinn who wants to avenge her. Anime News Network writer Carl Kimlinger said that in the series' OVA finale, Kira was highly developed. Matt Hill's English-language performance in the OVA was criticized in comparison with other voice actors from the series who were praised. Kimlinger said Kira had "grown into a martial leader of Buddha-like calm and compassion", and that the last OVA allows viewers to enjoy his actions. On the other hand, Manga News claimed that because of Kira comes across as a messiah figure with too much strength in Destiny that several viewers of the series were annoyed by such portrayal.

In regards to the film Gundam SEED Freedom, Kira was often praised for the focus his romantic relationship with Lacus often being compared with the developers of the movie as the writer had died when writing the film and the director happens to be her husband. Real Sound said that the novelization of the movie felt to further explore Kira's pain and kindess as he becomes more involved in the war on his own. Kira's thoughts are clearly depicted in the novel, and we can see that although he may seem indecisive, he is a man with strong convictions. When Kira becomes brainwashed by the Compass and starts acting against the law, Lacus ironically is the one who others the forces to stop him. The second novel helps to add far more peaceful scenes between Kira and Lacus as a sign of relief to the fans. The second novelization was praised for Lacus joining up with Kira's Mighty Strike Freedom more explained than in the movie. The couple is able to pilot the mobile suit together to defeat the leaders of the Compass. Manga News claimed that because Kira comes across as a more flawed in individual in Freedom than in Destiny when dealing with fights and remembering his encounter with Durandal and philosophy that his character was more enjoyable to watch.

=== Analysis ===
In an analysis of gender roles in anime by Shunyao Yu from University of Jyväskylä, Kira's characterization was noted to challenge typical ones by having Gundam SEED start with Kira as a sensitive teenager who becomes mature across the narrative. In a further analysis, Kira was noted to be as a mentally unstable forced soldier in the plot due to how Kira starts suffering depression due to failing to protect a ship containing innocent civilians. Kira and Flay's relationship are also noted to stand out as "comfort abuse" within the franchise, alongside the narrative of Mobile Suit Zeta Gundam, due to how Flay manipulates Kira to fight for Archangel's cause. While in the early episodes of the series, Kira was attracted to her, he had not planned to start a relationship with her with sexual tones that felt written to make Flay similar to a prostitute. The writer notes that after Kira's apparent death in his fight against Athrun Zala, Flay develops guilt for turning Kira in a soldier. Meanwhile, the fight between Kira and his best friend was commented as the idea of the chaos war can cause.

Kira is described by Sophia Tate from University of Tasmania as a realistic war soldier but more sympathetic than his rivals as, while he suffers grief during, he does not expose such ideals of revenge shown by his friends. His parallels with Athrun were also noted as both characters are treated heavily by their superiors to follow their orders and keep fighting during their war. The relationships Kira develops also result in tragedy in the same way as Athrun's, making it especially notable for the viewers as the dying soldiers have had appearances for nearly thirty episodes. In particular, the character's actions have been compared with soldiers from World War II. In the book Japan and Asia: Business, Political and Cultural Interactions, Kira is noted to be properly linked with the Freedom mobile suit he pilots as his actions can be treated as a terrorist despite the pílot's desire to end war at any cost especially in Destiny.

=== Controversy ===
The sixteenth episode of Gundam SEED features a scene in which Kira is seen dressing after getting out of a bed where Flay lies sleeping naked, suggesting a sexual relationship. The Japanese Commission for Better Broadcasting reported that viewers filed complaints regarding the scene as the show was aired at 6 pm when children would be watching. Mainichi replied by mentioning it should have given more careful consideration to the episode before airing it. The scene was extended in one of the compilation films with John Oppliger noting it expanded the off-screen scene with three shots.
