= Shinn Asuka =

Fictional character from Mobile Suit Gundam SEED Destiny

- Mobile Suit Gundam SEED Destiny character
- Shinn Asuka in Mobile Suit Gundam SEED Destiny
- First appearance: Mobile Gundam SEED Destiny episode 1
- Voiced by: Kenichi Suzumura (Japanese); Matthew Erickson (English, Ocean dub); Aaron Phillips (English, NYAV dub, Mobile Suit Gundam SEED Destiny); Kieran Regan (English, Mobile Suit Gundam SEED Freedom)

In-universe information
- Family: Mayu Asuka (sister)
- Significant other: Lunamaria Hawke (girlfriend)
- Genetic type: Coordinator

Shinn Asuka (Japanese: シン・アスカ, Hepburn: Shin Asuka) is a fictional character in the Japanese science fiction anime television series Mobile Suit Gundam SEED Destiny by Sunrise, part of the Gundam franchise. Appearing as the series' lead character, Shinn is a member from the military organization ZAFT composed of genetically advanced humans known as Coordinators. Shinn joined ZAFT after his family had been killed during the previous war between ZAFT and the Earth Alliance, and bears an enormous hatred towards his home country Orb for not protecting them. Across the series, Shinn starts questioning his motives to fight for ZAFT. He is voiced in the Japanese series by Kenichi Suzumura. In English, he is voiced by Matthew Erickson in the Ocean dub, by Aaron Phillips in the NYAV Post dub of Mobile Suit Gundam SEED Destiny, and Kieren Regan in the dub of Mobile Suit Gundam SEED Freedom.

Shinn has also been featured in the films and manga adaptations, reprising his role from the Gundam SEED Destiny. He is also featured in various video games from the franchise as well as crossover titles. Shinn was developed as the opposite from Kira Yamato, the protagonist from the series' prequel Mobile Suit Gundam SEED with director Mitsuo Fukuda stating that nevertheless both would go through similar developments. Shinn's character has been well received by anime fans, appearing in Anime Grand Prix polls and Sunrise polls, being ranked as one of the most popular anime characters. On the other hand, critical reception for Shinn has been mixed due to his antagonistic personality as well as his actions across the series' second half.

== Appearances ==
=== In Mobile Suit Gundam SEED ===
Shinn is first spotted in Gundam Seed Episode 39 "Trembling World" where he is seen registering for ZAFT and listening to an announcement by Patrick Zala. Rey Za Burrel is also seen standing behind him.

=== In Mobile Suit Gundam SEED Destiny ===
Shinn is introduced in the series as a member of the military organization ZAFT from the colony PLANT, working as the pilot of the mobile suit ZGMF-X56S Impulse (ZGMF-X56S インパルス) under the command of Talia Gladys, captain of the battleship Minerva. While Shinn is often seen as a friendly person, he bears an enormous hatred towards the rulers of the country of Orb, where he lived alongside his parents and his younger sister. Shinn's family was killed in a crossfire between mobile suits from the Earth Alliance and Orb during the Bloody Valentine war. When Athrun Zala becomes Shinn's commander, he is initially angered by his appointment, but eventually comes to respect him. Upon the start of a new war between ZAFT and the Earth Alliance, Shinn saves a girl named Stella Loussier from drowning. The two befriend each other, without realizing that they were actually fighting each other in the war. Shinn discovers she is an Earth Alliance's soldier only after he defeats her mobile suit in a battle. Because of Stella being an Extended, a person injected with drugs from a young age to fight at the same level of the Coordinators, the Minerva staff can not do anything to stop her health from deteriorating. Shinn takes the dying Stella to her superior Neo Roanoke knowing he is the only one who can save her. However, Shinn once again battles Stella who is attacking Berlin in an enormous transformable mobile suit. Stella had gone berserk due to her fear of dying and her mobile suit is then destroyed by Kira Yamato, a pilot from the Archangel ship that is trying to stop the war. Stella dies in Shinn's arms due to the injuries received from her suit's destruction.

Angered with Stella's death, Shinn starts training with his friend Rey Za Burrel to defeat Kira in an upcoming battle. Following his victory, PLANT Chairman Gilbert Durandal gives him the mobile suit ZGMF-X42S Destiny (ZGMF-X42S デスティニー) to pilot as a reward for his actions. When Athrun is deemed to be a traitor by ZAFT, Shinn follows his superiors orders to kill him when he escapes with a mobile suit alongside Shinn's comrade Meyrin Hawke. While shocked about his actions, Shinn is comforted by Meyrin's older sister, Lunamaria Hawke, who he starts growing closer to as she feels Shinn is not to blame for her sister's apparent death. In following battles against the Earth Alliance, Shinn learns that both Kira and Athrun are alive, with the latter joining the former and is questioned about his motives to fight. Rey convinces Shinn to continue following Durandal's will and he defeats most of Earth Alliance's forces. When the Minerva is confronted by the Archangel again, Shinn is defeated by Athrun in battle with all the other Minerva forces also being defeated.

=== In Mobile Suit Gundam SEED Freedom ===
Shinn returns in the sequel film as a member of peacekeeping group COMPASS serving under Kira, fulfilling his promise from the end of Destiny to join him. He serves COMPASS alongside some of his old crewmates from the Minerva, namely his lover, Lunamaria, and his old superior, Arthur. Surprisingly, Shinn pilots an upgrade of his former mentor Athrun's old machine, the STTS-808 Immortal Justice Gundam, something he humorously bemuses about in the film. After the Immortal Justice is destroyed, Shinn, along with Kira and Lunamaria, are gifted by Cagali upgraded rebuilds of their old machines, with Shinn receiving the ZGMF/A-42S2 Destiny Gundam Spec II, which he uses in the film's climactic final battle. Notably, it has a new color scheme (in honor of his fallen comrade Rey and his ZGMF-X666S Legend Gundam), a Hyper Deuterion Beam that can charge other mobile suits, and a significantly improved Mirage Colloid system from its predecessor that can create self-directing "mirage clones".

=== In other media ===
Shinn has also appeared in the original video animation Mobile Suit Gundam SEED Destiny Final Plus, that remakes the events from series' last episode. After ZAFT's defeat, Shinn meets the Kira Yamato in person and both decide to join forces for a peaceful future. He also stars in the Mobile Suit Gundam SEED Destiny: Special Edition films series that retell the events from the Gundam SEED Destiny television series. He remains in ZAFT after the war's ending, alongside Kira and Lunamaria. He has also been featured in the two manga adaptations from the series, Mobile Suit Gundam SEED Destiny and Mobile Suit Gundam SEED Destiny: The Edge. Mobile Suit Gundam SEED Destiny: The Edge Desire deals with both Shinn's backstory and aftermath after the events of the Second Bloody Valentine War. Shinn also appears in the manga Mobile Suit Gundam SEED Destiny Astray when ZAFT presents the Impulse for the first time. There is also a character CD based on Shinn's character with tracks performed by his Japanese voice actor, Kenichi Suzumura.

Shinn is a pilot in the video game Mobile Suit Gundam Seed Destiny: Rengou vs. Z.A.F.T. and its sequel Mobile Suit Gundam Seed Destiny: Rengou vs. Z.A.F.T. II with his two mobile suits. He is also featured in the Gundam crossover games Dynasty Warriors: Gundam 2 and Dynasty Warriors: Gundam 3 with Destiny as a playable mobile suit. Shinn is playable in both Mobile Suit Gundam: Gundam vs. Gundam and Gundam vs. Gundam Next, with the Impulse and Destiny though the latter was not added until PlayStation Portable version of the first game. He is an unlockable in the third game, Mobile Suit Gundam: Extreme Vs.. Shinn also appears in the Super Robot Wars series starting on Super Robot Wars Z and Super Robot Wars K. Shinn is also playable with the Destiny mobile suit in Another Century's Episode: R.

== Creation and conception ==
During initial episodes from Mobile Suit Gundam SEED Destiny, director Mitsuo Fukuda did not want to talk too much about Shinn's character. However, he defined him as Kira's opposite in regards to their personalities when comparing the two lead characters. Shinn is defined as a civilian whose character could already go through a large development in contrast to Kira who was forced to become a soldier in the prequel Mobile Suit Gundam SEED. In comparison with Kira, Shinn was stated to be character harder to predict his role in the TV series. As with Kira in Gundam SEED, Fukuda mentioned Shinn's character would also change across the series. Kenichi Suzumura was especially hired to work as Shinn's Japanese voice actor with Fukuda stating he was not a character difficult to play. Fukuda also anticipated Suzumura's work as Shinn's voice actor in an optimistic way. Before the series' premiere, staff member Kabashima Yousuke gave hints about Shinn's character, telling that the Gundam SEED Destiny's protagonist would be a character not seen in the prequel, and he would have a thin appearance.

== Reception ==
Shinn's character has become popular within fans, appearing various times in the Anime Grand Prix popularity polls for favorite male characters. He first appeared in sixth place in 2004, dropping to seventh place in 2005, and twelfth place in 2006. In a Newtype poll, Shinn was voted as the seventeenth most popular male anime character from the 2000s. In an official Gundam poll by Sunrise, Shinn was voted as the third character with the strongest family bonds. In another poll from the same site regarding who was most childish hero within the Gundam franchise, Shinn was at the top. In another poll in which fans were asked who was the most memorable characters from Gundam SEED Destiny, Shinn was second.

Publications for manga, anime and other media have commented on Shinn's character, giving him mainly mixed critics. His introduction to the series was noted to lack impact by Paul Fargo from Anime News Network owing to his limited screentime in the first episodes. Additionally, his hostility shown towards other popular characters from Gundam SEED led Fargo to find him more as an "antagonistic and obnoxious" person much to the viewers. A similar response was made by Luis Cruz from Mania Entertainment who stated that Shinn's debut was overshadowed by Athrun Zala's role in the first episodes. Nevertheless, Cruz wanted to know his character would be developed to learn his motivations to fight. DVDTalk's Don Houston found his hatred for Orb because of his family's death being uncommon as he did not blame "the attackers like most sane people would do". His personality was also found reminiscent to the one of Kira Yamato by Ross Liversidge from UK Anime Network who also expected such two characters to engage in battle in following episodes. Maria Lin from Animefringe stated that Shinn's relative younger age from the ones of Gundam SEED's returning characters was meant to emphasize the frustration to the beginning of another major conflict.

Shinn's and Stella's relationship was praised by Cruz for the friendship mainly they made because both of them were unaware they are enemies. However, although in following reviews from Gundam SEED Destiny, Liversidge liked how Shinn's and Stella Loussier's relationship concluded ending in a tragic way due to their battles, he found Kira's role in the series to be more likable. Moreover, in the series finale, he wondered whether Shinn would do an action appreciated by the viewers, but ended favoriting the scene in which an angered Athrun defeats him with a "much deserved kicking" as at the same time Shinn's attitude was teased. Shinn's role in the OVA Final Plus that remade the last episode was noted to have made his defeat more satisfying to the viewers, as well as giving a last chance for viewers to like him.

Shinn's role in Gundam SEED Freedom has been praised by Real Sound for his iconic fight scene in the Destiny Gundam where he fights Black Knight in a manner similar to ninjutsu where the mobile suit generates clones of itself. However, the execution of such technique remains in mystery. In retrospect, Dengeki Online enjoyed the handling of Shinn as while he was shocked when seeing him lose his final duel in Destiny, Freedom gives me a more heroic portrayal that appealed to his nostalgia of the TV series even if he has mixed feelings of the character piloting the Immortal Justice. The fact that the film kept addressing Shinn and Lunamaria's relationship among other couples appealed to the writer.
