= Athrun Zala =

- Mobile Suit Gundam SEED, Mobile Suit Gundam SEED Destiny character
- Athrun Zala in Mobile Gundam SEED
- First appearance: Mobile Suit Gundam SEED episode 1
- Voiced by: Akira Ishida (Japanese); Sam Vincent (English, Ocean); Chris Hackney (English, NYAV)

In-universe information
- Family: Patrick Zala (father); Lenore Zala (mother)
- Significant others: Lacus Clyne (ex-fiancée); Cagalli Yula Athha (girlfriend)
- Genetic type: Coordinator

Athrun Zala (Japanese: アスラン・ザラ, Hepburn: Asuran Zara) is a fictional character from the Japanese science fiction anime television series Mobile Suit Gundam SEED and its sequel Mobile Suit Gundam SEED Destiny, part of the Gundam franchise. In the former, Athrun Zala is introduced as a member from the military organization ZAFT, composed of genetically enhanced humans known as Coordinators. Participating in the war between Coordinators and regular humans, referred to as Naturals, Athrun discovered that his childhood friend Kira Yamato was a member of the Naturals' military organization, the Earth Alliance, despite being a Coordinator. Across the series, Athrun encounters Kira and, after almost killing him, Athrun starts questioning his own motives to participate in the war. Athrun returns in Gundam SEED Destiny participating in another war and is the protagonist of its compilation films. He is voiced in Japanese by Akira Ishida and in English by Sam Vincent in the Ocean dub and by Chris Hackney in the NYAV dub.

Athrun has appeared in manga adaptations from the series, taking the leading role in Mobile Suit Gundam SEED Destiny: The Edge. He is featured in games from both Gundam SEED and the Gundam franchise, as well as crossovers in general. Athrun's character has been highly popular, taking high spots in polls from the Gundam franchise, as well as the Anime Grand Prix polls. Publications from manga, anime and other media have commented on Athrun's character, providing positive response due to his relationships and his role in the series.

== Appearances ==
=== In the TV series ===
In Mobile Suit Gundam SEED Athrun is one of the genetically enhanced humans known as Coordinators who joined the military organization ZAFT that battles the regular humans, the Naturals, in the Bloody Valentine War. His appearance begins at the start of the series Athrun is a member of Rau Le Creuset's team which carries out a ZAFT raid on the neutral colony Heliopolis. The team steals several advanced mobile suits created by the Earth Alliance; Athrun himself confiscates the GAT-X303 Aegis (GAT-X303 イージス). During the raid he finds that his childhood friend Kira Yamato has become the pilot of the mobile suit GAT-X105 Strike. As ZAFT is assigned to destroy the Earth Alliance ship Archangel, Athrun encounters Kira at times as the latter was protecting the ship to protect his friends. When Kira kills one of Athrun's comrades in combat, Athrun tries to kill Kira by self-destructing the Aegis alongside the Strike, escaping just before its detonation. He is found by Cagalli Yula Athha of the neutral country Orb, who despite being angered by Kira's supposed death, allows him to return to ZAFT after both discuss the reasons for killing.

After returning to ZAFT, Athrun is given the mobile suit ZGMF-X09A Justice (ZGMF-X09A ジャスティス) by his father Patrick Zala for his achievements in war. Patrick orders him to track and recapture or destroy the mobile suit ZGMF-X10A Freedom, which was stolen by Athrun's fiancée Lacus Clyne and to eliminate her. He is unable to follow his orders after he learns that Kira is alive and is the pilot of the Freedom. As the Archangel plans to face both ZAFT and the Earth Alliance to end the war, Athrun decides to talk to his father. Patrick reveals that he intends to continue the war on until all the Naturals have been exterminated. Upon Athrun's refusal to reveal the location of Freedom and Justice, Patrick's soldiers arrest him. He is later saved by the Clyne faction and joins the newly formed resistance group called the Three Ships Alliance which includes the Archangel. To end the war, Athrun and Cagalli go into Jachin Due. There they find Patrick was shot by a ZAFT commander before he could fire the superweapon GENESIS. Athrun then destroys GENESIS by detonating the nuclear-powered Justice inside it, to stop ZAFT's attack.

Two years after the war in Mobile Suit Gundam SEED Destiny, Athrun is living under the pseudonym Alex Dino (アレックス・ディノ, Arekkusu Dino) working as Cagalli's bodyguard, who rules Orb. In the declaration of the Second Bloody Valentine War, Athrun returns to ZAFT, hoping to avert the war. Athrun meets with ZAFT Chairman Gilbert Durandal, who appoints him a member of the elite special forces, FAITH. Athrun is assigned the new mobile suit ZGMF-X23S Saviour (ZGMF-X23S セイバー) and joins the ship Minerva from ZAFT. There, Athrun becomes commander of the mobile suit pilots, becoming a mentor to Shinn Asuka, though the two do not always get along well. In the fights against the Earth Alliance, the Archangel interferes to reduce the number of casualties, but Athrun decides not to return with them, stating that they are making the situation worse. During a clash between the three groups, the Saviour is destroyed by Kira's Freedom, leaving Athrun without a mobile suit. Following ZAFT's attack on the Archangel, Athrun begins to question their motives. Later, he learns that Durandal is preparing to frame him as a traitor. Athrun escapes from ZAFT with Meyrin Hawke in a stolen mobile suit, which is later destroyed by Shinn. The pair is rescued by the Archangel. During ZAFT's invasion of Orb, Lacus gives Athrun the ZGMF-X19A Infinite Justice (ZGMF-X19A インフィニットジャスティス) mobile suit, which he uses to join Kira and the Archangel to fight against ZAFT. Athrun goes into space aboard the Archangel and fights alongside them in their attempt to stop Durandal from implementing his plans. In the final battle against ZAFT he assists in the destruction of the superweapon Requiem, defeating Shinn along the way.

In Mobile Suit Gundam SEED Freedom, one year after the events of Destiny, Athrun is not a member of Compass like the other cast, but works in Orb as an agent of Terminal, alongside his former ZAFT colleague Meryin. Interestingly, he does not pilot the upgraded Immortal Justice, instead opting to let his mentee, Shinn, pilot it in his stead. He makes a surprise appearance later in the film, assisting Kira and the Compass team after they are ambushed by the Black Knights, piloting a Z'Gok. He reveals the true nature of the Foundation to the rest of the protagonists, as well as their plans involving the use of Requiem and the Destiny Plan, and snaps Kira out of his depression to renew his will to fight. In the film's climactic battle, he engages the Black Knights ace pilot, Shura, revealing within the Z'Gok is his original Infinite Justice, now upgraded to the Inifnite Justice Type II. He is able to defeat Shura by humorously thinking of Cagalli sexually; freaking Shura out to avoid being mind controlled (Shura yells at Athrun for having an "impure fantasy;" a conversation Cagalli hears, who gets annoyed and blushes when she realizes what Athrun was thinking), and reunites with her at the end of the film on Earth, where it is revealed she still has the ring he gave her in Destiny.

=== In other media ===
Athrun appears in the original video animation Mobile Suit Gundam SEED Destiny Final Plus that expands his role from the sequel's finale. Author Chimaki Kuori had enjoyed Athrun's character in the Gundam SEED Destiny which resulted in the manga series Mobile Suit Gundam SEED Destiny: The Edge, telling the events from the TV series from Athrun's point of view. Author Chimaki Kuori had enjoyed Athrun's character In the Gundam SEED and Gundam SEED Destiny manga, author Masatsugu Iwase tries to make him look gallant while not making him look too feminine as he wanted to make Athrun look affected by Kira.

Athrun appears in the two series of films compilations of Gundam SEED and Gundam SEED Destiny, and is the narrative figure from the latter ones. He remains as an Orb soldier in the latter series' end, working alongside his former ZAFT comrades. He has been featured in two character CDs from the series with tracks performed by his Japanese voice actor, Akira Ishida.

Athrun reappears in the sequel film Mobile Suit Gundam SEED Freedom. Unlike the other protagonists, Athrun is not a member of COMPASS, but is a member of its progenitor group, Terminal. He also does not pilot a Gundam for the majority of the film, instead piloting a Z'Gok in his signature red colors. In the climax of the film during the final battle, the Z'Gok is revealed to be a shell unit for his true mobile suit, the ZGMF-X191M2 Inifinite Justice Type II. He is later seen flying over the skies of Orb with Cagalli, confirming they did reunite.

In the Game Boy Advance game, Mobile Suit Gundam Seed: Tomo to Kimi to Senjou de, the players walks around with Athrun asking people what a good gift would be. In Mobile Suit Gundam Seed: Rengou vs. Z.A.F.T. and Mobile Suit Gundam Seed Destiny: Rengou vs. Z.A.F.T. II, Athrun can be playable in both modes, as a ZAFT pilot or as an Orb pilot. Athrun is a pilot in Dynasty Warriors: Gundam 2 and Dynasty Warriors: Gundam 3 with Infinite Justice as a playable mobile suit. Athrun appears in Mobile Suit Gundam: Gundam vs. Gundam and its sequel, Mobile Suit Gundam: Gundam vs. Gundam Next, piloting the Aegis. The Saviour and Infinite Justice also appear as Mobile Assists for the Force Impulse (original Gundam vs. Gundam only) and the Strike Freedom respectively. In Mobile Suit Gundam: Extreme Vs., Athrun is playable in the Infinite Justice. Another crossover game in which he is playable is Gundam Assault Survive, piloting the Aegis. Athrun appears along with many other Gundam SEED characters in Super Robot Wars Alpha 3. Athrun appears in Another Century's Episode 3 piloting the Justice and in Another Century's Episode R piloting the Infinite Justice.

== Reception ==
Athrun's character has been well received by anime fans, having appeared in the Anime Grand Prix popularity polls in the category of favorite male characters. He came in second in 2002, fourth in 2003, first in 2004, second in 2005, and third in 2006. In a Newtype poll, Athrun was voted as the third most popular male anime character from the 2000s. Two Sunrise polls asked fans what was the most memorable characters from Gundam SEED and from Gundam SEED Destiny; Athrun was fifth in the former and third in the latter. In the poll focused in the best team ups between former enemies, he and Kira were second. In an online poll from 2012, Athrun was voted as Gundam SEED's second most popular character. His Japanese voice actor Akira Ishida won as the most popular voice actor in the Seiyu Awards 2004 for his portrayal as Athrun in the category "Best Actors in supporting roles". Athrun, along with five other notable mecha and pilots from the Gundam series, were recognized in the second set of "Anime Heroes and Heroines" stamps, released in Japan in 2005.

Critical reception for Athrun's character has often been positive. THEM Anime Reviews' Derrick L. Tucker cited him as strong character with his questions regarding war resembling Kira's. Chris Beveridge from Mania Entertainment stated that while Gundam SEED was primarily focused on Kira's growth, Athrun often "stole the show in a lot of ways" citing their rivalry and his angst displayed during its final episodes. Comments have also been focused on Athrun's and Kira's relationship with IGN's Andy Patrizio disliking the number of times they shouted each other's names. Writing for Mania Entertainment, Kim Wolstenholme was worried about how much would Kira's and Athrun's relationship would be focused in Gundam SEED, but liked how Lacus's introduction added tension to it, because of how she and Kira started relating despite Athrun being engaged with her. Moreover, Ross Liversidge from UK Anime Network enjoyed the development from their rivalry as it resulted in well done fight scenes from each of their mobile suits. Furthermore, Athrun's confrontations with Cagalli across the series were praised due to how their characters' were developed while talking with each other.

Reviewing the manga of Gundam SEED Destiny Julie Gray from Comic Book Bin praised his relationship with Cagalli, emphasizing how integral is it to the story. Don Houston from DVD Talk commented on Athrun's background regarding his actions against his father to stop his plans "in the name of super greater calling". Houston wondered about his future actions in Gundam SEED Destiny regarding his return to ZAFT as well as how his relationship with Durandal would be developed. Athrun's last battle against Shinn Asuka in Gundam SEED Destiny was Liversidge's favorite moment from the DVD he reviewed mainly due to how the former gives the latter "a much deserved kicking" with Athrun losing his temper. Samuel Vincent's portrayal as Athrun in Gundam SEED Destiny was pointed by Carl Kimlinger from Anime News Network as one of the strongest ones from the casting.

According to the website Real Sound the couple Cagalli and Athrun is highly popular and the film Gundam Seed Freedom alongside its novelization cheered up the fans thanks to its focus on them and this can be explored further more as parallel to Kira and Lacus.
