= Matthew Erickson =

Canadian voice actor (born 1980)

- Born: July 23, 1980 (age 46); Rosebud, Alberta, Canada
- Occupation: Voice actor

Matthew Erickson (born July 23, 1980) is a Canadian voice actor who works for Ocean Productions in Vancouver, British Columbia, Canada and the Calgary, Alberta-based Blue Water Studios. He was born and raised in rural Alberta. He has played several roles in anime, most notably Zoids: Chaotic Century, Zoids: Guardian Force, Shinn Asuka in Gundam Seed Destiny and Amuro Ray in Zeta Gundam.

== Anime roles ==
- Banner of the Stars - Jinto Lin
- Banner of the Stars II - Jinto Lin
- Betterman - Keita Aona
- Beyblade Burst Evolution - Django Del Torro
- Ceres, The Celestial Legend - Yuhi Aogiri
- Crest of the Stars - Jinto Lin
- Dragon Ball GT - Trunks (Blue Water dub)
- Fancy Lala - Yoshio
- Hikaru No Go - Yoshitaka Waya
- Mobile Fighter G Gundam - Domon Kasshu (teen)
- Mobile Suit Gundam SEED Destiny - Shinn Asuka
- Mobile Suit Gundam SEED Destiny: Special Edition - Shinn Asuka
- Mobile Suit Zeta Gundam - Amuro Ray
- Nana - Nobuo "Nobu" Terashima
- Shakugan no Shana - Hayato Ike (Season 1)
- The Daichis - Earth Defence Family - Yashiro's Underling
- The Story of Saiunkoku - Ryuren Ran, Soldier 2, Vassal
- Zoids: Chaotic Century - Van Flyheight

== Other animation ==
- The Little Prince - Semitone (The Planet of Time, episodes 7–8)
- Sabrina: Secrets of a Teenage Witch - Harvey Kinkle

== Video game roles ==
- Mobile Suit Gundam: Journey to Jaburo - Kai Shiden
- Mobile Suit Gundam: Gundam vs. Zeta Gundam - Amuro Ray (0087)
- Dynasty Warriors: Gundam 2 - Shinn Asuka
- Dynasty Warriors: Gundam 3 - Shinn Asuka
