= Cagalli Yula Athha =

- Mobile Suit Gundam SEED, Mobile Suit Gundam SEED Destiny character
- Cagalli Yula Athha in Mobile Suit Gundam SEED Destiny
- First appearance: Mobile Suit Gundam SEED episode 1
- Voiced by: Naomi Shindō (Japanese); Nanako Mori (Japanese, Mobile Suit Gundam SEED Freedom); Vanessa Morley (English, Ocean); Cherami Leigh (English, NYAV)

In-universe information
- Family: Uzumi Nara Athha (adoptive father); Kira Yamato (twin brother)
- Significant other: Athrun Zala (boyfriend)
- Genetic type: Natural

Cagalli Yula Athha (Japanese: カガリ・ユラ・アスハ, Hepburn: Kagari Yura Asuha) is a fictional character introduced in the Japanese science fiction anime television series Mobile Suit Gundam SEED by Sunrise, part of the Gundam franchise. In the series, Cagalli is one of the regular humans, labeled as Naturals, fighting against genetically enhanced humans known as Coordinators in a prolonged war. Despite being seen fighting on the battlefield at various times alongside the Naturals military organization the Earth Alliance, Cagalli is later revealed to be the daughter of Uzumi Nara Athha, the leader of the neutral country of Orb. After assisting her new allies to stop the war, Cagalli becomes the leader of Orb. Her new role as such is further explored in the series sequel, Mobile Suit Gundam SEED Destiny. Cagalli is voiced by Naomi Shindō and Nanako Mori in Japanese. In English, she is voiced by Vanessa Morley in the Ocean dub and by Cherami Leigh in the NYAV dub.

Cagalli has also reprised her role from the TV series, in the films recollections from Gundam SEED and Gundam SEED Destiny as well as its manga adaptations. Her character has also been well received in Japan, having appeared various times in the Anime Grand Prix polls for the favorite female anime character category, as well as online polls by Sunrise regarding the Gundam franchise. Critical reception for Cagalli has also been positive, mostly because of her strong personality and development across both TV series.

== Appearances ==
=== In the television series ===
Cagalli is first seen in the Heliopolis space colony where she discovers that advanced mobile suits have been developed for the Earth Alliance by Orb. During ZAFT's attack on Heliopolis, Cagalli runs into Kira Yamato who leads her to an evacuation shelter. She reappears when ZAFT's Andrew Waltfeld destroys the town of Tassil, forcing her and her comrades from the Desert Dawn to chase after him. Outmatched, several resistance fighters are killed until Kira arrives in the Strike to save them. Cagalli stays with the Archangel ship assisting it in battle with a spare FX-550 Skygrasper while befriending Kira. When the Archangel reaches Orb, Cagalli reveals that she is the daughter of the Orb Union's Chief Representative Uzumi Nara Athha. Cagalli stays with Orb and later learns that captured ZAFT soldier Athrun Zala has apparently killed Kira. She confronts Athrun but allows him to return to ZAFT. Cagalli later learns of Kira's survival and reunites with him as well as Athrun who has joined forces with Kira.

When the Earth Alliance under the direction of Blue Cosmos attacks Orb, Cagalli's father gives her a photograph of her and Kira when they were babies revealing that they are twins. Cagalli then escapes on board the Kusanagi as her father and the other Orb leaders sacrifice their lives by self-destructing the Kaguya mass driver in order to prevent it from being used by the Earth Alliance. Cagalli then joins the Three Ships Alliance, which is trying to stop the genocidal intentions of the leaders of both sides. There, she starts a romantic relationship with Athrun and becomes the pilot of the mobile suit MBF-02 Strike Rouge (MBF-02 ストライクルージュ) to protect him.

By Mobile Suit Gundam SEED Destiny, set two years after Gundam SEED, Cagalli has taken her father's former position as Chief Representative of the Orb Union. She is accompanied by Athrun, who acts as her aide and bodyguard, on a diplomatic mission to the PLANT's where she meets with Chairman Gilbert Durandal to discuss matters regarding increased militarization. Within Orb, Cagalli is manipulated by others to endorse an alliance between the Earth Alliance and Orb and to go through with an arranged marriage with Yuna Roma Seiran to finalize the agreement. Kira kidnaps Cagalli during her wedding and takes her to the Archangel. Cagalli realizes her mistake and from the Archangel attempts to reason with Orb's military forces in an effort to stop them from fighting against ZAFT. However, Yuna refuses to acknowledge Cagalli and orders Orb's forces to open fire on her. Having returned to ZAFT, Athrun blames the Archangel for making the situation worse, much to Cagalli's shock. When the Archangel returns to Orb, it is under attack by ZAFT and Earth Alliance forces seeking the sheltered Lord Djibril, leader of Logos. There Cagalli receives the ORB-01 Akatsuki (ORB-01 アカツキ) mobile suit as Uzumi's will. Piloting the Akatsuki, Cagalli resumes her position as Orb's leader and orders the arrest of Yuna. She then leads a counter-attack against ZAFT. She is able to keep Shinn Asuka at bay long enough for Kira's return. Afterwards, Cagalli remains in Orb to tend to her responsibilities as Orb's leader, while the Archangel returns to space to continue the fight against ZAFT.

=== In other media ===
Besides starring in the TV series, Cagalli is also featured in two series of films Mobile Suit Gundam SEED: Special Edition and Mobile Suit Gundam SEED Destiny: Special Edition which retell the events from its respective series. In the latter film's ending as well as the original video animation, Cagalli makes a peace agreement with ZAFT, remaining in Orb. She is also featured in the manga adaptations of both Gundam SEED and Gundam SEED Destiny, the latter also including Mobile Suit Gundam SEED Destiny: The Edge. In the manga Mobile Suit Gundam SEED C.E. 73 Δ Astray Cagalli meets a team from Mars during their visit to Orb but disappears when she is kidnapped by Kira during the events of Gundam SEED Destiny.

She is also featured in several video games from the series including Mobile Suit Gundam Seed: Rengou vs. Z.A.F.T. and Mobile Suit Gundam Seed Destiny: Rengou vs. Z.A.F.T. II where she is playable piloting the Strike Rouge and the Akatsuki. She has also been featured in a character CDs from the series with tracks performed by her Japanese voice actress, Naomi Shindō.

== Reception ==
Cagalli's character has been very popular in Japan; she has appeared various on the popularity polls in Anime Grand Prix as one of the best female anime characters. In 2002, she came in second, and later went fourth in 2003. She was second in both the 27th and 28th, and remained fourth in the 29th. In a Newtype poll, Cagalli was voted as the most popular female anime character from the 2000s. Cagalli was also the winner in a Sunrise poll that asked fans what female character from Gundam SEED and Gundam SEED Destiny would they want to see in swimsuit. She was also first in another that asked what female characters from the Gundam franchise would they want to see in a wedding dress. Two other polls from the same site asked fans what was the most memorable characters from Gundam SEED and from Gundam SEED Destiny; Cagalli was fourth in both of them.

Publications for manga, anime and other media have commented on Cagalli's character, giving generally positive response. In a review by Mania Entertainment writer Kim Wolstenholme, Cagalli was described with praise as a strong female character rather than a "wishy-washy character" seen in other anime series. He also liked her involvement in Gundam SEED following her short appearance in the series' first episode. A similar comment was made by Ross Liversidge from UK Anime Network who praised Cagalli's return in the series due to the fact the importance from her role was found "unexpected". Moreover, Liversidge favorited the episodes in which Cagalli and Athrun meet and fight for the first time, as it also developed their characters as the two talked. Writing for Mania, Chris Beveridge also liked Cagalli's involvement in the series citing her experience in combat as well as a romantic triangle that appeared to be between her, Kira and Flay Allster. In a later episode, Wolstenholme found that Cagalli's character had become more mature when she confronts Athrun about the reasons to kill somebody following her father's teachings, citing it as a strong quiet moments from the series. Reviewing the manga of Gundam SEED Destiny Julie Gray from Comic Book Bin praised Cagalli's romantical relationship with Athrun featured in the volume, emphasizing how integral is it to the story and pointing as the romantical theme brought by the series. Vanessa Morley's work as Cagalli's English voice actress was found to be "satisfyingly tomboyish" by Anime News Network writer Theron Martin despite noting that her Japanese voice actress, Naomi Shindō, portrayed more manly.

According to the website Real Sound the couple Cagalli and Athrun is highly popular and the film Gundam Seed Freedom alongside its novelization cheered up the fans thanks to its focus on them and this can be explored further as parallel to Kira and Lacus.
