= Mobile Suit Gundam (1995 video game) =

1995 video game

- Developer: BEC
- Publisher: Bandai
- Series: Mobile Suit Gundam
- Platform: PlayStation
- Release: JP: June 23, 1995; JP: March 29, 1996 Version 2.0
- Genre: First-person shooter
- Mode: Single-player

Mobile Suit Gundam (機動戦士ガンダム) is a first-person shooter video game developed by BEC and published by Bandai for the PlayStation in Japan on June 23, 1995. It is an adaptation of the 1979 anime series Mobile Suit Gundam. An update of the game with several improvements, subtitled Version 2.0, was released on March 29, 1996.

== Gameplay ==
Adapted from the 1979 anime of the same name, Mobile Suit Gundam is a first-person shooter where the player takes on the role of rookie pilot Amuro Ray in the cockpit of the titular RX-78-2 Gundam. There are ten stages in total. The game features a control scheme utilizing ten buttons on the gamepad. In combat, the player can utilize a shield and weapons selected either manually or automatically. The types of weapons include a machine gun (weak with infinite ammunition), a laser rifle (medium strength but overheats), a bazooka (strong but with limited ammunition), and a laser sword (strong but with short range).

== Development and release ==
Mobile Suit Gundam was developed by BEC, a subsidiary of conglomerate publisher Bandai. Assistant producer Hirofumi Inagaki, the original plan was to show both the protagonist Amuro Ray and the Gundam on-screen, but they settled on the cockpit perspective. The game was initially released in Japan on June 23, 1995. An update, subtitled Version 2.0, was released March 29, 1996. Improvement were made to the gameplay, visuals, and audio; new stages, enemies, CG cutscenes, and anime clips were added; and a new playable character was included in the form of antagonist Char Aznable in his red Zaku. Mobile Suit Gundam was not released internationally, possibly due to the Gundam franchise being relatively unknown at the time.

== Reception ==
Reception

Review scores
Publication	Score
Famitsu	8/10, 5/10, 8/10, 6/10
Next Generation	2/5
Game Power	50/100
Gamers	4/5
Super GamePower	3.8/5
Ultimate Future Games	50%
Ultimate Gamer	5/10
Video Game Advisor	C

Next Generation reviewed the PlayStation version of the game, rating it two stars out of five, and stated that "for people looking for a mildly interesting first-person shooter, this one may be the answer."

A best-seller in Japan, the initial release of the game was number seven in The Nihon Keizai Shimbun software sales ranking for 1995. According to Famitsu sales data, its Version 2.0 release sold 336,275 units in 1996, ranking 36th for that year.
