= Kidou Senshi Gundam Seed: Rengou vs. Z.A.F.T. =

2005 video game

- Cover art of the PlayStation 2 version
- Developer: Capcom
- Publishers: Banpresto (Arcade); Bandai (PS2); Namco Bandai Games (PSP)
- Platforms: Arcade, PlayStation 2, PlayStation Portable
- Release: Arcade: JP: July 2005; PlayStation 2: JP: November 17, 2005; PSP: JP: April 5, 2007
- Genres: Action-adventure, Anime
- Modes: Single player, Multiplayer

Kidou Senshi Gundam Seed: Rengou vs. Z.A.F.T. (機動戦士ガンダムSEED 連合vs.Z.A.F.T.) is a third person arcade game based on the Gundam Seed franchise. It was developed in 2005 by Capcom and published by Banpresto, Bandai, and Namco Bandai Games in Japan. Similarly to Mobile Suit Gundam: Gundam vs. Zeta Gundam, the player can choose to ally themselves with either O.M.N.I., Z.A.F.T. or Blue Cosmos and fight against the other factions. The Arcade Mode has 9 stages plus a bonus Extra Stage.

On November 11, 2005, a PlayStation 2 port was released in Japan which featured new pilots and units from the sequel Gundam Seed Destiny, as well as new unlockable features.

A sequel, Kidou Senshi Gundam Seed Destiny: Rengou vs. Z.A.F.T. II was released in 2006.

== Kidou Senshi Gundam Seed: Rengou vs. Z.A.F.T. Portable ==
In April 2007, A port of the game was also released for the Sony PSP by Bandai Namco Games in Japan. In addition to the extras available in the PlayStation 2 version of the game, the PSP version includes an all new Mission Mode with missions based on the plot of the anime. Aside from the new mode, the PSP version is an otherwise direct port of the PlayStation 2 version with all unlockables from PS2 version already unlocked in the PSP game without the need to play Arcade Mode several times.

== Game Modes ==
=== Arcade Mode ===
This mode provides the same basic gameplay as the original arcade, with the added bonus that players may configure various fight settings to customize the gameplay. The AI skill level, along with Damage dealt/received, round time, boost gauge, and other options for Arcade battles, may be adjusted in Game Options. Players may also choose to engage in cooperative gameplay with a friend in the Arcade multiplayer co-op mode. However, not all units in the game are playable in this mode. In August 2005, it was revealed that the restriction that characters could only pilot mobile suits which they had piloted in the anime was removed, allowing players to select any character and unit they wanted.

=== Free Battle/VS Mode ===
Versus Mode features all playable units in the game, including units you cannot select in Arcade Mode. This mode supports up to 4 human players or play against 3 AI opponents in a free-for-all deathmatch or in teams. The PlayStation Portable version uses the PSP's Ad Hoc mode to connect players but does not support Game sharing so each player must have their own copy of the game.

=== Mission Mode (PSP Exclusive only) ===
In Mission Mode, the player must first choose between allying with O.M.N.I. or Z.A.F.T. About half-way through the storyline, players can choose to either continue serving their original alliance or defect to the Orb Union. Players start off with two of four basic units, depending on their initial alliance. Players fighting for the O.M.N.I. forces start off with the FX-550 Skygrasper and UWMF/S-1 GINN WASP. Those playing as Z.A.F.T. pilots are given the TFA-2 ZuOOT and UWMF/S-1 GINN. As the game progresses, players will also acquire new units after beating certain missions. Additionally, points awarded after each mission allow players to upgrade to better mobile suits by filling up their SP gauge (similar to leveling up with an EXP gauge in most RPGs). Different units are made available depending on the choice of upgrades selected by the player.

== Playable characters ==
ZAFT:

- Shinn Asuka *PS2/PSP version only*
- Lunamaria Hawke *PS2/PSP version only*
- Rey Za Burrel *PS2/PSP version only*
- Athrun Zala (SEED)
- Athrun Zala (DESTINY) *PS2/PSP version only*
- Yzak Joule (SEED)
- Yzak Joule (Scar)
- Yzak Joule (DESTINY) *PS2/PSP version only*
- Dearka Elsman
- Dearka Elsman (DESTINY) *PS2/PSP version only*
- Rau Le Creuset
- Nicol Amalfi
- Miguel Aiman
- Andrew Waltfeld
- Andrew Waltfeld and Aisha
- Marco Morassim
- ZAFT Green Pilot
- ZAFT Red Pilot
- Heine Westenfluss

OMNI:

- Sting Oakley *PS2/PSP version only*
- Stella Loussier *PS2/PSP version only*
- Auel Neider *PS2/PSP version only*
- Orga Sabnak
- Clotho Buer
- Shani Andras
- OMNI Pilot

Orb Union:

- Kira Yamato (SEED Student)
- Kira Yamato (SEED Pilot Suit)
- Kira Yamato (ZAFT Pilot Suit)
- Kira Yamato (DESTINY) *PS2/PSP version only*
- Cagalli Yula Athha (Desert Suit)
- Cagalli Yula Athha (Pilot Suit)
- Mu La Flaga
- Sai Argyle
- Tolle Koenig
- Asagi Caldwell
- Mayura Labatt
- Juri Wu Nien
- Orb Union Pilot
