= Mobile Suit Gundam Side Story III: Sabakareshi Mono =

1997 vehicle simulation game

Gundam Gaiden III
- Developer(s): Bandai
- Publisher(s): Bandai
- Platform(s): Sega Saturn
- Release: JP: 1997
- Genre(s): Vehicle simulation game
- Mode(s): Single-player, multiplayer

Mobile Suit Gundam Side Story III: Sabakareshi Mono is a video game in the Japanese franchise Gundam, developed and published by Bandai for the Sega Saturn. It is the final volume of the Blue Destiny trilogy, following Side Story I: Senritsu no Burū and Side Story II: Ao wo Uketsugu Mono.

== Gameplay ==
Sabakareshi Mono follows the player while advancing through the Mobile Suit Corps.

== Reception ==
Next Generation reviewed the Saturn version of the game, rating it one star out of five, and stated that "Although marketed as a separate game in Japan, this is nothing more than a glorified expansion pack – and a poor one at that. This is the kind of game that makes you glad the Sega-Bandai merger fell through."

== Reviews ==
- MAN!AC / M! Games (1997-04-09)
