= SD Gundam: Scad Hammers =

2006 video game

- Developer: Bandai
- Publisher: Namco Bandai Games
- Series: SD Gundam
- Platform: Wii
- Release: JP: December 2, 2006
- Genre: Action-adventure
- Mode: Single-player

SD Gundam: Scad Hammers (Note: Japanese: SDガンダム スカッドハンマーズ, Hepburn: Esudī Gandamu Sukaddo Hanmāzu) is a Mobile Suit Gundam video game developed by Bandai and published by Bandai Namco Games for the Wii console as a launch title for the system in Japan on December 2, 2006. The game is based on the SD Gundam spin-off franchise, with the game having heavy emphasis on the usage of the Gundam Hammer.

== Plot ==
The game is a loose, comedic retelling of the story of the original Mobile Suit Gundam series. Tem Ray, chief engineer of Project V, finishes his work on the RX-78-2, but to the dismay of General Revil, Commander in Chief of the Earth Federation Forces, the Gundam was only equipped with the Gundam Hammer. Soon after, the forces of Zeon attack Side 7, and Amuro Ray, the main protagonist of the original series, is forced to become the test pilot.

== Gameplay ==
The game utilizes the Wii Remote and Nunchuk. The Nunchuk attachment is used to control the Gundam, while swinging the Wii Remote swings your hammer. The swing of the Wii Remote determines which way the hammer will swing. The overall objective is to clear each area, of which are randomly generated, by wiping out the various MS units on the field.

== Reception ==
Reception

Review scores
Publication	Score
Famitsu	33/40
GamesRadar+	3.5/5

SD Gundam: Scad Hammers sold 9,801 copies during launch week, and 45,439 by the end of 2007.

GamesRadar+ gave the game a 3.5/5, stating, "You see, to the uninitiated there are few things less welcoming than Gundam - a writhing mass of franchises and back-story that refuses to stop for breath and explain itself. All of which makes Scad Hammer's accessibility such a pleasant surprise." They noted that while the gameplay is so accessible that "even Grandma can play", they criticized the game's graphics, boring combat, and said that the Wii Remote could have been used to greater effect.
