= Super Hero Generation =

2014 video game

- Developers: Bandai Namco Studios, Tom Create
- Publisher: Bandai Namco Games
- Series: Compati Hero
- Platforms: PlayStation 3, PlayStation Vita
- Release: JP: October 23, 2014
- Genre: Tactical role-playing game
- Mode: Single-player

Super Hero Generation (Japanese: スーパーヒーロージェネレーション, Hepburn: Sūpā Hīrō Jenerēshon) is a tactical role-playing game produced by Bandai Namco Games that features characters from the Kamen Rider, Ultraman and Gundam, three iconic Japanese TV series. Released for the PlayStation 3 and PlayStation Vita in Japan on October 23, 2014, Super Hero Generation has many similarities to the Super Robot Wars series, also produced by Bandai Namco.

Two editions of the game was released, a regular version and a Special Sound Edition featuring background music from the respective series.

== Gameplay ==
The game follows the story of characters of all three series as they travel to different worlds, encountering heroes and enemies of that respective world. The game is driven by a manga style narrative where conversations are held between characters during each mission.

Each mission takes place on a grid-like level where each unit occupies one space on the map. The player selects the heroes to be deployed for the mission and is presented with a Mission Trigger and a Secret Shock. Each one of these represents a goal for the user to achieve in the level. Successfully completing the Secret Shock will spawn a new wave of bonus enemies that offers bonus experience. The story progresses when the objective for the Mission Trigger is reached which spawns new enemies and unlocks the Boss Break objective. Completing the Boss Break objective moves the mission story forward again and summons the final wave of enemies. If all mission objectives are cleared, the last remaining enemy in the stage will enter a Last Stand mode where it powers up and rewards more experience on defeat. Clearing all the enemies in the level or clearing the main objective in the mission will end the mission.

The missions are separated into turns where the player has the chance to move and attack with each of their heroes. After the turn is passed, the enemy turn begins and each enemy will be controlled by the computer AI. If two units engage each other, the player will have the opportunity to attack, defend, dodge, or use an item. Once the user has selected their action, a skippable 3D cutscene is shown depicted the battle sequence. Each unit has a limited number of attacks which each costs a certain amount of energy. If there is insufficient energy the hero cannot attack.

Outside of missions, there is also a store where items can be purchased. Two types of items exist: equippable items and consumable items. Each hero can equip one equippable item at a time and it typically provides a stat boost. Consumable items are one time use and provide a temporary buff or replenishes stats when used in an Ultraman.

== Characters ==
Super Hero Generation has a total of 38 playable characters, 13 from the Ultraman and Gundam series, 14 from the Kamen Rider Series and 1 original character, Theo. Iconic enemies from the three series also make an appearance.

Ultraman	Kamen Rider	Gundam
Ultraman Ginga	Kamen Rider Wizard	Unicorn Gundam
Ultraman Zero	Kamen Rider Fourze	00 Raiser
Ultraman Tiga	Kamen Rider W	F91 Gundam
Ultraseven	Kamen Rider Black RX	Nu Gundam
Ultraman Mebius	Kamen Rider OOO	Gundam AGE-2 Double Bullet
Ultraman	Kamen Rider Den-O	Freedom Gundam
Ultraman Taro	Kamen Rider Nadeshiko	Cherudim Gundam
Jean-nine	Kamen Rider Birth	Justice Gundam
Ultraman Ace	Kamen Rider Ichigo	Seravee Gundam
Ultraman Hikari	Kamen Rider Beast	Arios Gundam
Zoffy	Kamen Rider Meteor	Gundam AGE-2 Dark Hound
Ultraman Jack	Kamen Rider Accel	Gundam AGE-1 Flat
	Kamen Rider Aqua	

== Reception ==
Famitsu gave the game a score of 31/40. The game's PS3 and Vita versions sold a total of nearly 30,000 copies within the first few days of release.
