= Gundam Evolution =

- Developer: Bandai Namco Online
- Publishers: Bandai Namco Entertainment (Console); Bandai Namco Online (PC)
- Composer: Tadayoshi Makino
- Engine: Unreal Engine 4
- Platforms: Windows; PlayStation 4; PlayStation 5; Xbox One; Xbox Series X/S
- Release: Windows; September 21, 2022; PS4, PS5, Xbox One, Xbox Series X/S; November 30, 2022
- Genre: First-person shooter
- Mode: Multiplayer

Gundam Evolution (ガンダムエボリューション, Gandamu Eboryūshon) was an online first-person team shooter developed by Bandai Namco Online and published by Bandai Namco Entertainment. The game launched as part of the Gundam media franchise on Windows on September 21, 2022, and later released on PlayStation 4, PlayStation 5, Xbox One, and Xbox Series X/S on November 30.

On July 19, 2023, Bandai Namco Entertainment announced that service for Gundam Evolution would end with the shutting down of the game’s servers on November 29.

== Gameplay ==
Gundam Evolution was a team-based shooter, where two opposing squads, with six players each, enter combat as they seek to perform opposing objectives on the map. These objectives vary depending on the game mode and include Point Capture, where players must attempt to attack and capture points on the map from the defending team, Domination, which has both teams attempt to capture three points on the map and Destruction, which has teams trying to activate or stop a weapon of mass destruction that the other team is trying to use against them.

== Development ==
The game's production was revealed in July 2021, when the developer began seeking applications for closed beta testing. Further plans for console releases were announced in March 2022.

== Reception ==
Reception

Aggregate scores
Aggregator	Score
Metacritic	PC: 72/100
OpenCritic	60% recommend

Gundam Evolution received a score of 72/100 on review aggregator Metacritic, based on nine published reviews.
