= Mobile Suit Gundam SEED Destiny: Special Edition =

2006 anime film series by Mitsuo Fukuda

- Gundam Seed Destiny: Special Edition

機動戦士ガンダムSEED DESTINY スペシャルエディション (Kidō Senshi Gundam Shīdo Desutinī Supesharu Edishon)
- Genre: Mecha, Action, Drama
- Created by: Hajime Yatate; Yoshiyuki Tomino
- Anime television film

The Shattered World
- Directed by: Mitsuo Fukuda
- Written by: Chiaki Morosawa
- Music by: Toshihiko Sahashi
- Studio: Sunrise
- Licensed by: NA: Sunrise
- Released: May 26, 2006
- Runtime: 92 minutes
- Anime television film

Their Respective Swords
- Directed by: Mitsuo Fukuda
- Written by: Chiaki Morosawa
- Music by: Toshihiko Sahashi
- Studio: Sunrise
- Licensed by: NA: Sunrise
- Released: August 25, 2006
- Runtime: 92 minutes
- Anime television film

Flames of Destiny
- Directed by: Mitsuo Fukuda
- Written by: Chiaki Morosawa
- Music by: Toshihiko Sahashi
- Studio: Sunrise
- Licensed by: NA: Sunrise
- Released: November 24, 2006
- Runtime: 92 minutes
- Anime television film

The Cost of Freedom
- Directed by: Mitsuo Fukuda
- Written by: Chiaki Morosawa
- Music by: Toshihiko Sahashi
- Studio: Sunrise
- Licensed by: NA: Sunrise
- Released: February 23, 2007
- Runtime: 92 minutes

Mobile Suit Gundam SEED Destiny: Special Edition (機動戦士ガンダムSEED DESTINY スペシャルエディション, Kidō Senshi Gundam Shīdo Desutinī Supesharu Edishon) is Gundam SEED Destiny's counterpart to Gundam SEED: Special Edition. It is a four-part compilation movie.

== Overview ==
Like the three specials of Gundam SEED, these specials feature new or changed scenes of the TV series. However unlike the TV series, which was told in the points of view of main characters Shinn Asuka and Kira Yamato, the Special Edition was told through the eyes of Athrun Zala, giving the movies a much more neutral point of view. The DVD quartet, as opposed to the series, seems to put much more emphasis on Shinn's romantic relationship with Lunamaria Hawke and much less emphasis on Lunamaria's prior crush on Athrun so that fans could see a much easier transition from Shinn being romantically involved with Stella Loussier to Lunamaria, rather than in the series, which just had it as a sudden occurrence.

== Broadcast on Japanese TV ==
- First special, "The Shattered World" (covers episodes 1 to 13 of the series), aired in two parts on May 2 and May 3, 2006.
- Second special, "Their Respective Swords" (covers episodes 14 to 28 of the series), aired in two parts on July 27 and July 28, 2006.
- Third special, "Flames of Destiny" (covers episodes 29 to 42 of the series), aired on October 8, 2006.
- Fourth special, "The Cost of Freedom" (covers episodes 43 to 50 of the series and the "Final Plus" episode, "The Chosen Future"), aired on February 23, 2007.

== Ending and insert songs ==
Ending songs (in order)

- "Result" by Nami Tamaki
- "Tears" by lisa
- "Enrai (Tooku ni Aru Akari)" by HIGH and MIGHTY COLOR
- "Kimi wa Boku ni Niteiru" (君は僕に似ている; You Resemble Me) by See-Saw

Insert songs

- "Fields of hope" by Rie Tanaka (Special Edition I, IV)
- "Mizu no Akashi" (水の証; "Water Seal") (partial) by Rie Tanaka (Special Edition I)
- "Zips (UNDER:COVER version)" by T.M.Revolution (Special Edition I)
- "EMOTION" by Rie Tanaka (Special Edition II)
- "Meteor" (Meteor -ミーティア-, Mītia) by T.M.Revolution (Special Edition II)
- "Shinkai no Kodoku" (深海の孤独; The Sea's Loneliness) by Houko Kuwashima (Special Edition III)
- "Vestige" (vestige -ヴェスティージ-, Vesutīji) by T.M.Revolution (Special Edition III-IV)
