= Gihren no Yabou =

Video game series

Gihren's Greed (Japanese: ギレンの野望, Hepburn: Giren no Yabō), is a series of turn-based strategy video games produced by Bandai, based on the Gundam franchise. It takes its gameplay style from the SD Gundam series and adds political and military management to the One Year War. The Japanese title, Giren no Yabō, is derived from that of Nobunaga's Ambition, although the English title uses a different translation for the word yabō.

== Gihren's Greed ==
Released in 1998 for the Sega Saturn, the game follows the path of either the Federation or Principality of Zeon throughout the One Year War. The player has 150 turns to defeat the opposing side with either a scenario victory or a complete victory. Alterations can be made to the timeline, preventing deaths and disasters which in turn alter other timeline events.

Mobile Suit Gundam: Gihren's Greed

- Kidou Senshi Gundam: Gihren no Yabou - Sega Saturn - 1998
- Kidou Senshi Gundam: Gihren no Yabou [Append Disc] - Sega Saturn - 1998
- Kidou Senshi Gundam: Gihren no Yabou Special - Bandai WonderSwan Color - 2003

== Gihren's Greed: Blood of Zeon ==
Blood of Zeon features a more complex political system compared to the original Gihren's Greed. The player can now create ceasefires and treaties, and the military system now supports mobile suit upgrading and customization. The map system was also updated. Blood of Zeon also introduces mobile suits and characters from various Gundam OVAs, along with the third-party factions Titan, A.E.U.G, and the Axis.

On release, Famitsu magazine scored the Dreamcast version of the game a 30 out of 40, and gave the PlayStation version a 33 out of 40.

Mobile Suit Gundam: Gihren's Ambition: Blood of Zeon

- Kidou Senshi Gundam: Gihren no Yabou, Zeon no Keifu - PlayStation, Dreamcast - 2000
- Kidou Senshi Gundam: Gihren no Yabou, Zeon no Keifu [Append Disc] - PlayStation - 2000
- Kidou Senshi Gundam: Gihren no Yabou, Zeon no Keifu + [Append Disc] - PlayStation Portable - 2005

== Gihren's Greed: War for Zeon Independence ==
War for Zeon Independence adds an updated map system and military system to a rewritten script, several new characters, an updated spying system and Mobile Suits from MSV. The battles are fought in full 3D, unlike previous titles in the series. However, this installment omits the Zeta Gundam era conflicts featured in Blood of Zeon. As a result, the Principality of Zeon and the Earth Federation are the only factions featured in this entry. However, after completion of the game with each team, an option to use them in IF mode is unlocked. Each completion of the game increases the player's "IF" Level and more points to use in IF Mode. IF Mode allows the player to create their own team; Choosing such options as a leader (or creating their own leader), Their home base, which officers to start with, which technology group their faction is in and what units the player starts with. This also comes with a variety of Scenarioes to play through, with preset IF modes.

On release, Famitsu magazine scored the game a 33 out of 40.

Mobile Suit Gundam: Gihren's Greed: War for Zeon Independence

- Kidou Senshi Gundam: Gihren no Yabou: Zeon Dokuritsu Sensouden - PlayStation 2 - 2002
- Kidou Senshi Gundam: Gihren no Yabou: Zeon Dokuritsu Sensouden [Append Disc] - PS2 - 2003
- Kidou Senshi Gundam: Gihren no Yabou: Zeon Dokuritsu Sensouden + [Append Disc] - PS2 - 2005

== Gihren's Greed: The Menace of Axis ==
Menace of Axis is the fourth game in the series, released on February 7, 2008, for the PlayStation Portable. The game's graphics are rendered in 2.5D in line with PSP hardware constraints, Also, unlike its predecessor 'War Of Independence', the game features conflicts from the One Year War (including the events of MS IGLOO) to Mobile Suit Zeta Gundam (with some events that occurred during the spinoff manga Advance of Z: Flag of Titans), Mobile Suit Gundam ZZ, and the events that take place during Mobile Suit Gundam: Char's Counterattack and Mobile Suit Gundam: Hathaway's Flash. Factions featured in "Blood of Zeon" also make an appearance (Federation, Zeon, AEUG, Titans, Axis forces), both the first and second Neo Zeon movements. Garma's "Zeon Reborn" and Kycillia's "Legitimate Zeon" (previously unique to Blood of Zeon) are also available. A noteworthy trait of the game is it featuring nearly every Gundam protagonist and antagonist that piloted a mobile suit or was on board a battleship. Features include 2 new difficulties, "Very Easy" and "Special". This game was re-released as an expansion entitled Gihren's Greed: The Menace of Axis V, featuring new characters, Mobile Suits, and a bonus faction, the Tem Ray Army. A version for the PS2 was also released.

According to an interview with Norihiko Ushimura, producer of the series, mobile suits from MS IGLOO, Harmony Of Gundam and Mobile Suit Variation are featured; there are said to be roughly 400 MS/MA featured in this version of the video game. Event scenes, however, do not have animation: instead there are more than 400 still scenes created in collaboration with Sunrise to represent important events as portrayed in previous titles.

Gihren's Greed: The Menace of Axis

- Kidou Senshi Gundam: Giren no Yabou - Axis no Kyoui - PSP - 2008
- Kidou Senshi Gundam: Giren no Yabou - Axis no Kyoui V - PSP/PS2 - 2009

== New Gihren's Greed ==
New Gihren's Greed is the fifth game in the series, released on August 25, 2011, for the PlayStation Portable. Like the original Gihren's Greed, it is focused on the One Year War.

- Kidou Senshi Gundam: Shin Giren no Yabou - PSP - 2011
