= Mobile Suit Gundam Side Story II: Ao wo Uketsugu Mono =

1997 vehicle simulation video game

Gundam Gaiden II
- Developer(s): Bandai
- Publisher(s): Bandai
- Platform(s): Sega Saturn
- Release: JP: 1997
- Genre(s): Vehicle simulation game
- Mode(s): Single-player, multiplayer

Mobile Suit Gundam Side Story II: Ao wo Uketsugu Mono is a video game in the Japanese franchise Gundam, developed and published by Bandai for the Sega Saturn. It is the second volume of the Blue Destiny trilogy.

== Gameplay ==
Ao wo Uketsugu Mono has missions that include destroy or protect, and simple escorts.

== Reception ==
Next Generation reviewed the Saturn version of the game, rating it three stars out of five, and stated that "Gundam Gaiden II is more an expansion pack rather than a separate game, and it should be considered as such. In that light, the game's slight graphical improvement but expanded mission goals and AI make it a welcome, if not fantastic, addition to the Saturn game library."
