= Mitsuo Fukuda =

Japanese animation director (born 1960)

- 福田 己津央
- Born: October 28, 1960 (age 65); Tochigi Prefecture, Japan
- Other names: 福田 満夫 およびふくだ みつお
- Occupations: Animation director, scriptwriter, storyboard artist
- Notable work: Future GPX Cyber Formula; Gear Fighter Dendoh; Mobile Suit Gundam SEED; Mobile Suit Gundam SEED Destiny

Mitsuo Fukuda (福田 己津央, Fukuda Mitsuo) (born October 28, 1960) is a Japanese animation director and scriptwriter from Tochigi Prefecture. He was married to anime screenwriter Chiaki Morosawa until her death in 2016.

== Career ==
Fukuda is a graduate of Waseda Senior High School. While in school, he was a member of the manga research society. After graduating from high school, he joined Sunrise in 1979 at the age of 19. He calls himself a disciple of Takeyuki Kanda, who directed Ginga Hyōryū Vifam, Choriki Robo Galatt, and Metal Armor Dragonar among others.

For the OVA series Future GPX Cyber Formula SAGA, Fukuda selected his wife, Chiaki Morosawa, who had been a family friend to talk with about work, to write the scripts, and since then, he has entrusted series composition to Morosawa for almost all of the works he has directed (Morosawa's scriptwriting work is also almost exclusively limited to series directed by her husband Fukuda).

Fukuda's major works include Future GPX Cyber Formula, Gear Fighter Dendoh and the Mobile Suit Gundam SEED series. Although he has been on a freelance basis since Dragonar, when he turned to directing, his participation in other companies' productions has been very limited, with the majority of his work being Sunrise productions. He has a close relationship with Takayuki Yoshii, former president and chairman of Sunrise, and Naotake Furusato, former producer at Sunrise, and most of his career has been spent participating in their works and series. In addition, as mentioned above, most of Morosawa's participation has been limited to works directed by Fukuda, but Furusato was the producer of Outlaw Star, the only series in which Morosawa participated that was not directed by Fukuda.

== Works ==
=== TV anime ===
- Invincible Robo Trider G7 (1980) - Setting production
- Saikyō Robo Daiōja (1981) - Setting manager
- Choriki Robo Galatt (1984) - Setting production
- Dirty Pair (1985) - Setting production
- Metal Armor Dragonar (1987) - Episode director, storyboards
- Mashin Hero Wataru (1988) - Episode director, storyboards
- Madö King Granzört (1989) - Episode director, storyboards
- Brave Exkaiser (1990) - Chief unit director, episode director, storyboards
- Future GPX Cyber Formula (1991) - Director, episode director, storyboards
- The Brave Fighter of Legend Da-Garn (1992) - Storyboards, episode director
- Mobile Suit Victory Gundam (1993) - Storyboards (episode 29)
- Wild Knights Gulkeeva (1995) - Storyboards (episode 13)
- Gear Fighter Dendoh (2000) - Chief director, storyboards, episode director
- Crush Gear Turbo (2001) - Chief 3D unit director, storyboards
- Mobile Suit Gundam SEED (2002) - Director, episode director, storyboards
  - Mobile Suit Gundam SEED: Special Edition (2004) - Director, unit director, storyboards
  - Mobile Suit Gundam SEED HD Remaster (2012) - Director, episode director, storyboards, key animation (uncredited)
- Mobile Suit Gundam SEED Destiny (2004) - Director, episode director, storyboards
  - Mobile Suit Gundam SEED Destiny: Special Edition (2006–2007) - Director, unit director, storyboards
  - Mobile Suit Gundam SEED Destiny HD Remaster (2013) - Director, episode director, storyboards
- Cross Ange (2014) - Creative producer, storyboards, mechanical unit director
- Cestvs: The Roman Fighter (2021) - Storyboards (episode 10)
- Grendizer U (2024) - Chief director

=== Movies ===
- Mobile Suit Gundam SEED Freedom (2024) - Director/Co-Writer

=== OVA ===
- Future GPX Cyber Formula 11 (1992) - Chief director, original story, script, storyboards, episode director
- Future GPX Cyber Formula ZERO (1994) - Chief director, original story, script, storyboards, episode director
- Private Eye Dol (1995) - Director
- Mobile Suit Gundam: The 08th MS Team (1996) - Promo storyboards
- Super Atragon (1996) - Director, storyboards (episode 2)
- Future GPX Cyber Formula EARLYDAYS RENEWAL (1996) - Director, script, episode director
- Future GPX Cyber Formula SAGA (1996) - Chief director, original story, storyboards, episode director
- Future GPX Cyber Formula SIN (1998) - Chief director, original story, storyboards, episode director

=== Web anime ===
- Megohime Animation (2019, 2020, 2021) - Director
- Blade of the Immortal (2019) - Storyboards (episode 10)
- Gundam Build Divers Re:Rise (2020) - Storyboards (episodes 18, 22, 25), episode director (episode 25)
- Gundam Build Real (2021) - Action storyboards

=== Games ===
- Busou Shinki: Battle Masters Mk.2 (2011) - Opening storyboards, supervision

=== Novels ===
- Future GPX Cyber Formula SAGA (1998)
