= Mobile Suit Gundam: Gundam vs. Gundam =

2008 video game

- Artwork for the PlayStation Portable edition.
- Developer: Capcom
- Publisher: Namco Bandai Games
- Designer: Atsushi Tomita
- Platforms: Arcade, PlayStation Portable
- Release: JP: March 2008 (Arcade); JP: November 20, 2008 (PSP)
- Genre: Shooting
- Modes: Single-player, Multiplayer
- Arcade system: System 256

Mobile Suit Gundam: Gundam vs. Gundam (機動戦士ガンダム ガンダムvs.ガンダム|Kidō senshi Gandamu Gandamu vs. Gandamu) is an arcade game developed by Capcom and published by Bandai Namco Games, released in March 2008. Unlike the previous games, this game crosses over multiple Gundam series rather than focusing on one source material. The game features up to 30 different Mobile Suits, and a play system similar to previous titles in the Gundam Vs. series.

Bandai Namco released a PlayStation Portable version on November 20, 2008. The sequel, Mobile Suit Gundam: Gundam vs. Gundam Next was released on March 18, 2009.

== Background ==
Unlike the previous series that are set up in the same general universe (Universal Century or Cosmic Era), the background of this game is set up in the real gaming world in 2030, which the Gundam vs. Series produced many spin-offs for each series at that time. The Devil Gundam has somehow invaded into the game systems and merge the different worlds into one. In order to restore the order of the game nature, various heroes from different Gundam Series are joined to fight against the Devil Gundam.

The game currently featured nearly every TV, OVA and movie production as far as Mobile Suit Gundam 00 (but with the only exception of New Mobile Report Gundam Wing: Endless Waltz). Though most of the units are leading Gundam Mobile Suits, a few non-Gundam units (mostly piloted by leading rivals) are also selectable. Battlefields are made from the general image of the production, rather than reforming the battlefield scene in the animation.

== System changes ==
Cost System: Each team has 6000 points. Unlike the previous series, the game reduced the classes of costs into only three - 1000, 2000, and 3000. Also, if player's unit cost is higher than the remaining team points when respawn, the armour point also decreases proportionally (which called as "Cost-over")

Support Unit: Each unit has their own respective support unit, most of them act as a supporting attacker and attack the opponent actively, but a few of them (like Gun-EZ in Victory Gundam) will also act as a shield unless players launches an attack or time has passed. Unlike most of the normal weapons, Support Unit cannot be reloaded unless the player's unit is destroyed.

G-Crossover: The Power-up system since Mobile Suit Gundam: AEUG vs. Titans has changed from enhancement to a large area attack system. Every title has their own G-Crossover attacks, which mostly feature a mass destruction weapon (e.g.: Destroy Gundam) or operations (e.g.: Colony Drop) related to the production.

Weapons and Alternate Units: Through the button combinations are similar to previous series, but many units can switch between weapons (mostly changes from a beam rifle to a beam cannon or else) Some of them can even change to an enhanced mobile suit, for example, the Gundam Mark II can be transformed into the Super Gundam, and the Strike Gundam could switch to Aile/Sword/Launcher Striker Packs. Weapons are not bounded when using a charging attack. Along with the standard attacks, like Double Zeta's Hi-Mega Cannon, and the finishing moves of God/Master Gundam. Some special attacks/effects can be used only in special conditions, Zeta Gundam's Bio-sensor, which gives two special attacks, will be activated for a short time only when the teammate being destroyed. For the Gundam Virsago, Gundam Ashtaron (in mobile armour mode) is treated as a weapon rather than a playable/support unit.

== Background Music ==
Although vocal theme songs (and sometimes insert songs) are featured in previous series. Almost all the title features a full-vocal theme song as their BGM this time, perhaps inspired by the Another Century's Episode Series. However, Zeta Gundam did not feature a theme song due to its complicated copyright issue, even they had one in Zeta Vs. series, they used a standard BGM instead. Mobile Suit Gundam 00 did not include their background music. They will stick to any other titles', or maps' background music in versus mode.

== Reception ==
Playing the PSP game at the Tokyo Game Show, Ryan Clements for IGN thought the game did not look good and did not its gameplay to be compelling. For the week of December 6, 2009, Gundam Vs. Gundam Next Plus was the third best selling game in Japan, selling 222,985 units. Famitsu gave a score of 32 out of 40 for the PSP version. UK Anime Network gave a rating of eight out of ten and summarized: "Solid, entertaining stuff which is accessible to Western gamers and won't disappoint Gundam enthusiasts."

== See also ==
Mobile Suit Gundam: Gundam vs. Gundam Next
