= Mobile Suit Gundam: Gundam vs. Zeta Gundam =

2004 video game

- Japanese GameCube cover art
- Developer: Capcom
- Publisher: Bandai
- Producers: Jun Takeuchi; Hideki Miyake; Ken Matsumoto
- Programmers: Manabu Kawase; Makoto Kadono; Kazushi Sano
- Artists: Ojh; Ryuji Higurashi; Sho Sakai
- Writer: Yoshiyuki Tomino (Story)
- Composers: Takeo Wantanabe; Yuji Matsuyamu; Shigeaki Saegusa
- Platforms: PlayStation 2, GameCube
- Release: JP: December 9, 2004; NA: June 29, 2005 (PS2)
- Genres: Action, Mecha simulation, Third-person shooter, Hack and slash, Air combat simulation (for air-type Mobile Armors only) and Naval combat simulation (for Grublo only)
- Modes: Single-player, multiplayer

Mobile Suit Gundam: Gundam vs. Zeta Gundam (機動戦士ガンダム ガンダムvs.Zガンダム, Kidō Senshi Gandamu: Gandamu vs. Zēta Gandamu) is a third-person shooter published in 2004 for PlayStation 2 and GameCube. It takes place seven years after the One Year War Gundam storyline. The game includes 31 mobile suits which can be played in five different modes: Arcade, Versus, Universal Century, Survival, and Training.

== Plot ==
Two pilots in combat

The game takes place within the continuity of Mobile Suit Gundam, Mobile Suit Zeta Gundam, and Mobile Suit Gundam ZZ. Although the overall environment that the arcade mode is placed in is set seven years after the one-year war that took place during the first major entry. In the game, the player can play through several game modes that will allow access to unlock characters, weapons, artwork and more. It is even possible to unlock Gundam suits from Gundam SEED (despite the fact Mobile Suit Gundam SEED does not take place in the universal century continuity).

== Gameplay ==
=== Arcade Mode ===
This allows players to choose between either the team up of the E.F.S.F and A.E.U.G, or the Titans and Zeons. Once done, the player will have the option to choose their own difficulty within the mode. The player must choose both a ground unit and a space unit for combat. They may also choose which weapons they want to customize for their characters. The player will then be put through a gauntlet of matches against computer control in which they have to fight. This mode is also two player, which can either be used to co-op or play against each other.

=== Versus ===
Versus mode is quite similar to the one on one option on arcade mode, except that there is only one match rather than a gauntlet of matches.

=== Survival Mode ===
Survival Mode allows player to battle an endless gauntlet of CPU players. Unlike in the arcade mode, the player will not recover health from matches. The player continues to fight until they have been defeated.

=== Training ===
This is the standard training mode for players that want to learn and experience the controls and gameplay as well as experiment with suit and weapon combinations without consequence.

=== Universal Century Mode ===
The Universal Century mode is at its core the campaign mode of the game. This allows the player to pick between three forces, The A.E.U.G, The Titans, and The Axis. Each team is its own storyline that the player can play through. They all take place within the Universal Century timeline that the First three Mobile Suit Gundam series revolve around.

== Playable characters ==
Pilots
Character	Team
Amuro Ray (0079)	Earth Federation
Hayato Kobayashi	Earth Federation
Kai Shiden	Earth Federation
Ryu Jose	Earth Federation
Sayla Mass	Earth Federation
Sleggar Law	Earth Federation
Jerid Messa	Titans
Paptimus Scirocco	Titans
Mouar Pharaoh	Titans
Four Murasame	Titans
Rosamia Badam	Titans
Kacricon Cacooler	Titans
Yazan Gable	Titans
Lila Milla Rira	Titans
Dunkel Cooper	Titans
Ramsus Hasa	Titans
Gates Capa	Titans
Sarah Zabiarov	Titans
Reccoa Londe	Titans
Emma Sheen	Titans
Buran Blutarch	Titans
Kamille Bidan	Anti-Earth Union Group
Quattro Bajeena	Anti-Earth Union Group
Apolly Bay	Anti-Earth Union Group
Roberto	Anti-Earth Union Group
Emma Sheen	Anti-Earth Union Group
Katz Kobayashi	Anti-Earth Union Group
Amuro Ray	Anti-Earth Union Group
Fa Yuiry	Anti-Earth Union Group
Reccoa Londe	Anti-Earth Union Group
Judau Ashta	Anti-Earth Union Group
Elpeo Pie	Anti-Earth Union Group
Char Aznable	Principality of Zeon
Lalah Sune	Principality of Zeon
Haman Karn	Principality of Zeon
Garma Zabi	Principality of Zeon
Dozle Zabi	Principality of Zeon
Black Tri-Stars	Principality of Zeon
M'Quve	Principality of Zeon
Ramba Ral	Principality of Zeon
Ple Two	Principality of Zeon
Apolly Bay	Principality of Zeon
Roberto (0079)	Principality of Zeon

== Development ==
The time of the production's start date is unknown. It is possible it could have been close to a year in between the release of its arcade counterpart, which would have been 2004. Although there is no official ties to the game, nor its developers. The possible prequel to this game in terms of story and setting is Mobile Suit Gundam: Federation vs. Zeon as the campaign mode takes place closer to the storyline of the first Mobile Suit Gundam entry. It is also likely that the game was developed on the third generation of the unreal engine given Bandai history with that system and the time period it was released.

The GameCube version was only released in Japan.

== Reception ==
Reception

Aggregate score
Aggregator	Score
Metacritic	57/100

Review scores
Publication	Score
1Up.com	C+
Famitsu	(PS2) 33/40 (GC) 32/40
Game Informer	6/10
GamePro	4/5
GameRevolution	D
GameSpot	6.6/10
GameZone	6/10
IGN	3.4/10
Official U.S. PlayStation Magazine	3/5
X-Play	2/5
Anime News Network	C

The PlayStation 2 version received "mixed" reviews according to the review aggregation website Metacritic. In Japan, however, Famitsu gave it a score of 33 out of 40 for the PS2 version, and 32 out of 40 for the GameCube version.

The game was praised for the number of available playable mobile suits and the number of different modes of play. However, it was criticized for the bland background, poor controls, low frame rates and a nonadjustable camera angle.
