= Kidou Senshi Gundam Seed Destiny: Rengou vs. Z.A.F.T. II =

2006 video game

- Developer: Capcom
- Publishers: Banpresto (Arcade); Namco Bandai Games (PS2) (Note: Released under the Bandai label.)
- Platforms: Arcade, PlayStation 2
- Release: Arcade: JP: June 29, 2006; PlayStation 2: JP: December 7, 2006
- Genre: Action-adventure
- Modes: Single player, multiplayer

Kidou Senshi Gundam Seed Destiny: Rengou vs. Z.A.F.T. II (機動戦士ガンダムSEED DESTINY 連合vs.Z.A.F.T.II) (Rengou meaning "Alliance") is a 2006 third person arcade game developed by Capcom and published by Namco Bandai Games. It is the sequel to Kidou Senshi Gundam Seed: Rengou vs. Z.A.F.T. with a slightly revised fighting system, new units and characters, and updates to old characters. Playable characters and units are taken from Mobile Suit Gundam SEED as well its sequel Mobile Suit Gundam SEED Destiny. Whereas the console version of its prequel had only a few units and playable characters from the beginning of Mobile Suit Gundam SEED Destiny such as the Impulse Gundam, RvZ2 includes characters and units from the entire series, such as the Strike Freedom Gundam and Infinite Justice Gundam

== Kidou Senshi Gundam SEED Destiny: Rengou vs. Z.A.F.T. II Plus ==
On December 7, 2006, a console version of the game was released by Namco Bandai Games for the PlayStation 2 in Japan. For the console release, a P.L.U.S. Mode was added where the player, as Shinn Asuka, attempts missions based on the events of Gundam SEED Destiny. Through the course of P.L.U.S. Mode, the player's actions influence his or her friendship with computer controlled characters. A positive relationship with a character will prompt that character to assist the player in battle and will unlock new movie sequences, though befriending certain characters may cause other characters to shun you depending on your choice of allies. New units and Arcade Mode routes are also available, notably those taken from the spin-off series Gundam SEED Stargazer.

== Gameplay ==
The game is played on a third person perspective, and is officially touted by the authors as a "2vs2" team-battle action game. A player selects a unit from a wide array of usable machines to use in battle, and a pilot from a given roster composed of characters from the series, with the option to create a 'nameless' pilot. Choosing a pilot determines the faction the player will join; otherwise, it is purely cosmetic.

A team is given 1000 points in their 'battle gauge', which is basically the team's lifebar. The goal in a traditional game revolves around depleting the opposing team's battle gauge to 0; this is done by destroying enemy units.

Each unit has its own abilities, pros and cons, ranging from weapons, firepower, speed, to cost. The selection of units affects gameplay; units with higher costs tend to have better performance and/or firepower, but destruction in battle will severely hurt the team's battle gauge, while units with lower costs and lower performance will allow the team to survive longer even after repeated losses.

=== Awakening ===
The sequel introduces new awakening modes, diversifying from its prequel's single Awakening mode.

'Awakening' is a mode which a player may activate to gain certain effects for a certain period of time. For the mode's duration, a player is endowed with abilities depending on the mode he/she chooses:

==== RUSH Mode ====
The awakening mode from the prequel. A player's attack delay is greatly decreased (allowing for rapid, consecutive attacks), and has increased defense. Weapon ammunition is also replenished at a faster rate, as well as speeding up the charging of special attacks.

==== POWER Mode ====
At the cost of some defense and speed, a player gains a boost in attack strength in this awakening mode. It also allows the player to ignore flinching from enemy attacks.

==== SPEED Mode ====
This mode greatly increases the player's movement speed and allows the player to cancel any movement (including attacks) with a jump or a step, as well as decreasing attack delay.

When activating any of the Awakening Modes, the player is able to instantly recover from enemy hits, providing a chance to counterattack.

== Game Modes ==
=== Arcade Mode ===
Arcade Mode (アーケード モード)is the standard arcade format of the game. The player selects a 'route' to follow, and a unit & pilot. The player will then have to complete 9 consecutive missions based on the route chosen, with a special 10th mission if certain conditions are met during the playthrough. The chosen pilot will also determine which faction the player joins; opposing units in battle may change according to the faction chosen.

In this mode, there may be certain stages where depleting the opposing team's battle gauge is not the objective; instead, a 'target' unit appears, which the player will have to defeat to end the level in victory.

Completing a mission with a high score results in the player receiving a 'Destiny' rank, and a 'FAITH' medal. Upon acquiring such a rank, the player is treated to a special 'EX' version of the next mission. The EX mission is usually more difficult than the non-EX version. This does not apply for RANDOM routes and the FINAL PLUS route.

After the 9th stage (FINAL PHASE), if the player has accumulated 5 or more FAITH medals, the player is brought to an extra stage called 'FINAL PLUS', in which the player only gets one shot to perform (no continue). Completion of this mission is optional, with victory or defeat ending the game either way. The odds are normally greatly stacked against the player in this level.

=== Versus Mode ===
In Versus Mode (also known as Fighting Mode, or 対戦 モード), player/s can customize their own battles (as opposed to following a route in Arcade mode). Participants choose their units and pilots, and the stage, and can now adjust match-specific settings such as damage level, time, boost amount, etc.

=== Challenge Mode (PS2 exclusive) ===
Challenge Mode (チャレンジ モード) pits the player in missions where the player must defeat waves of opponents with one life gauge/bar to score the highest points. Game rules modifications do not affect this game mode, so all settings are always on their default values.

=== P.L.U.S. Mode (PS2 exclusive) ===
P.L.U.S. Mode (P.L.U.S. モード) is the PS2-exclusive 'mission mode', where the player assumes the role of Shinn Asuka, and completes missions based on the SEED Destiny series.

In this game play mode, pilots (including Shinn, the player) are capable of becoming more powerful by means of leveling up. It is also in this game play mode that a 'relationship' system is formed, where the player can gain the trust of pilots in the SEED/SEED Destiny series, based on their actions in battle.

== Playable characters and units ==
The game features characters and mobile weapons from Mobile Suit Gundam SEED and Gundam SEED Destiny, Mobile Suit Gundam SEED Astray and Gundam SEED Destiny Astray, and Mobile Suit Gundam SEED C.E. 73: Stargazer.
