= Mobile Suit Gundam: Gundam vs. Gundam Next =

2009 video game

- Gundam vs. Gundam Next arcade flyer.
- Developer: Capcom
- Publisher: Namco Bandai Games
- Platforms: Arcade, PlayStation Portable
- Release: JP: March 18, 2009; (Arcade): JP: December 3, 2009; (PSP, Mobile Suit Gundam:Gundam vs. Gundam Next Plus)
- Genre: Fighting
- Modes: Single-player, Multiplayer
- Arcade system: System 256

Mobile Suit Gundam: Gundam vs. Gundam Next (|機動戦士ガンダム ガンダムVS.ガンダムNEXT|Kidō Senshi Gandamu Gandamu VS. Gandamu Nekusuto) is the sequel to Mobile Suit Gundam: Gundam vs. Gundam. It is part of the Gundam VS video game series from Namco Bandai Games. On September 15, 2009, Famitsu released gameplay screenshots of the PSP version, Mobile Suit Gundam: Gundam vs. Gundam NEXT PLUS, which was released on December 3, 2009. A sequel, Mobile Suit Gundam: Extreme Vs., was released in 2011.

== System changes ==
All the features from the previous title remain, including all player-usable units, with the exception that G-Crossover has been removed. A new system Next Dash, which can cancel moves instantly was introduced. Automatic blocking has been replaced by manual blocking. The music themes for Z Gundam, Gundam Wing, Gundam SEED, Gundam SEED Destiny, and Gundam 0083 are changed. Music theme for Gundam 00 has been added, and an additional theme has been added for Mobile Suit Gundam. The PSP features a new mode called "Next-Plus" which allows the player to form a team of four mechas and take them to complete missions.

== Reception ==
Famitsu gave the PSP version a rating of 34 out of 40. UK Anime Network gave a rating of eight out of ten and summarized: "A great improvement upon the original and a Gundam fan's wet dream."

== See also ==
Mobile Suit Gundam: Extreme Vs.
