= Dynasty Warriors: Gundam 3 =

2010 video game

- European cover art
- Developer: Omega Force
- Publishers: JP/NA: Namco Bandai Games; EU/AU: Tecmo Koei
- Composers: Shinichiro Nakamura; Masato Koike; Miki Fujii
- Series: Dynasty Warriors; Mobile Suit Gundam
- Platforms: PlayStation 3 Xbox 360
- Release: JP: December 16, 2010; NA: June 28, 2011; EU: July 1, 2011; AU: July 12, 2011
- Genres: Action role-playing, hack and slash
- Modes: Single-player, multiplayer

Dynasty Warriors: Gundam 3, known in Japan as Gundam Musou 3 (ガンダム無双3, Gandamu Musō Surī), is a tactical action video game based on the Gundam anime series and the sequel to 2008's Dynasty Warriors: Gundam 2. It was developed by Omega Force and published by Namco Bandai Games in Japan and North America, and Tecmo Koei in Europe and Australia. The game was revealed in the September issue of Famitsu and was released on December 16, 2010 in Japan, June 28, 2011 in North America, July 1, 2011 in Europe, and July 12, 2011 in Australia.

== Gameplay ==
=== From previous Dynasty Warriors titles ===
Dynasty Warriors: Gundam 3 follows in the style of previous Dynasty Warriors and Samurai Warriors games as an action-oriented hack and slash with some tactical elements. Despite their similar heritage, Koei's Gundam titles have unique gameplay mechanics that help set them apart from Koei's core Dynasty Warriors series. For example: players are given more ranged combat options than in other Dynasty Warriors games, although melee combat is still the focus of the game. Also, units in Dynasty Warriors: Gundam 3 are much more mobile, using their thrusters to dash, jump in mid-air, and (for some) even fly.

However, the greatest difference between Koei's Gundam titles (of which there are currently three) and Koei's Dynasty Warriors series is the core content: rather than using characters and story from the novel Romance of the Three Kingdoms, the games draw their material from across the various Mobile Suit Gundam anime and manga series.

=== From previous Dynasty Warriors: Gundam titles ===
This Gundam title features a new, cel-shaded graphical style that brings the series visually closer to its animated roots, along with a new streamlined HUD that minimizes screen clutter. The enemy A.I. (a commonly criticized weak point in the Dynasty Warriors franchise) has been revamped, with enemy units now gaining the ability to reinforce and support each other in combat. Original mode has been put back in the game along with several teams (Amuro, Setsuna, Kou, and Kira). Mission Mode has been expanded upon but rather than being one singular game mode it has been split into seven varieties:

- History missions – reenacts events from the original Gundam series. Unlike previous titles, these types of missions are available for the Universal Century-based story arcs -excluding Char's Counterattack- and alternate universes (Wing, X, G, Turn A, Seed Destiny and 00).
- Collection missions – lets players seek designs for a category of MS, such as Zeon types, red colored MS, and others.
- Memorial missions – when the player has reached certain milestones, such as shooting down 10,000 enemy units, these types of missions appear. They allow the player to obtain rare plans for their MS or rare pilot skills.
- Challenge missions – difficult tasks for the player to put their skills to the test.
- Friendship missions – opens the door for meeting other pilots by categorizing various characters into select missions. The players can choose to only fight alongside women, mobile fighters, or other such types of groups.
- Relation missions – missions that boost the player's relationship rating with other pilots.
- Special missions – if the player is low on gold, they can partake in these missions to get more.

Relationships are built in tiers (levels one to five) and building friendships with other characters has the ability to affect the player's character. Various actions, such as partnering with a character, will increase a character's relationship. Unlike the second game, relationship values do not decrease. When a character reaches a specific level of friendship, it can unlock new partners, power up the character's MS, or allow more operators for the player's character to select. The specific characters who affect these changes are shown as icons on the relationship level chart for the player's character. Additionally, creating various friendships is needed to unlock new missions.

There are over 300 different missions in this mode.

=== New features ===
- Emergency dash – When players fight through enemies, often they will encounter a situation where they either block or get hit by an attack. This title seeks to add diversity by implementing an "emergency dash" system. If the player times their dash moments before they are hit, their character will perform a special evasive maneuver to get them out of danger. Emergency dashes drain a portion of an MS's boost gauge, however, so players need to use these escapes with caution.
- Chance gauge – Mobile armors now have a tougher defense and come with a new feature for defeating them called the "chance gauge". The idea is to pummel the mecha repeatedly in order to fill up the meter located beside the mecha's name. When the gauge is filled, the player will then have a chance to cripple the giant and hit designated spots for critical damage. Mobile armors will still lose armor as the player hits it but getting the chance gauge filled is ideal for quickly taking them down and locating its weak spots.
- Partner strike – A new attack feature for this title is the "partner strike". Like the "team assist" from Warriors Orochi 2, players can order a secondary pilot to accompany them into battle. To order a partner to attack, the player needs to use a partner strike, which is gradually filled if a vanguard base is under control, or picked up from defeated enemies. Players can have a max of two at once.
- Chain explosion – When the player finishes off an enemy character with an SP or charge attack, the defeated MS may explode and damage nearby enemy units. The effect can be identified by a unique pink explosion.
- Missile base – Marked by a missile icon. Launches a destructive missile to blow up another field, marked on the game's mini map. If it is an enemy base, conquering the field can disrupt the order.
- Catapult – Fields that are conquered may randomly generate a catapult for the players to use. These mechanisms allow a player to hop to a faraway section of the map within seconds using aerial travel.
- Vanguard base – A stylized "C" icon. If the field is subdued with this active, their partner gauge and SP gauge will gradually increase.
- Home base – Emblems for the organizations; a star is for the player's forces while the winged icon represents the station for enemy troops. When the pivotal position is taken down, the morale for the affected side will drop instantly to zero.
- Fortress – Makes forces harder to decrease when present on field.
- Mobile suits factory – Claiming a field with this facility can restore a small portion of army forces gauge.
- Repair hangar – Restores the armor gauge for all allied pilots.

=== Partner strike types ===
Strike type	Strike description	Pilots
Funnel	Newtype pilots support the player with their funnels.	Amuro (Nu Gundam), Haman (Qubeley), Char Aznable (Sazabi)
Rush	Partner engages a group of enemies in front of player with physical attacks.	Master Asia (Master Gundam), Kamille (Z Gundam)
Screw	The partner's attacks draw enemies closer to player.	Duo (Gundam Deathscythe Hell), Full Frontal (Sinanju)
Lock on	Partner will target the precise enemy the player is confronting.	Heero (Gundam Wing Zero), Setsuna (00 Raiser)
Special	Partner restores morale gauge or heals the player's lost armor.	Cecily (Gundam F91), Sochie (Kapool)
Assist	Moving around the player in a unique manner, the partner then targets nearby foes.	Trowa (Gundam Heavyarms Kai), Emma (Gundam MK II)
Wide range	All out, powerful attack that hits enemies in a wide radius, but takes longer.	Four (Psycho Gundam), Dozle (Big Zam)

=== Multiplayer ===
This mode has four player online co-op for fifteen unique missions. These missions are designed to be impossible to complete alone and encourage teamwork with other players. During this mode, players can take the place of partner strikes for one another and initiate them to their desires called partner support. There can also be no doubles of the same character within player teams. Gold and experience earned in online mode is higher than playing a solo game.

During this mode, players can also find restorative items by collect lamps. A rank one lamp restores a fixed amount of armor for the team; rank two restores the armor to optimum settings. A rank three lamp has the same effects as the second rank except it also completely replenishes lost troops for allies. Knowing when to use a lamp is highly dependent on the team member who finds them. Players can communicate with one another using a voice communicator or with text.

Players can either join sessions already taking place or create their own for others to join. If there are no available spots, players can also place in tickets for a particular mission and character they wish to play.

Allegedly, more scenarios are planned for this mode.

=== Featured mobile suits and series ===
All series and almost all units (except for the Bolinoak Sammahn, Bawoo {Axis and Glemy's Rebellion types}, Geara Doga {Rezin Schnyder}, Gelgoog {Johnny Ridden Custom}, Jagd Doga, and Re-GZ) from Dynasty Warriors: Gundam 2 have returned for the series' third entry. This game also marks the debut of units from Mobile Suit Gundam 0083: Stardust Memory, Mobile Suit Gundam Unicorn, After War Gundam X, and Mobile Suit Gundam 00.

In addition, characters not returning from the previous game are Gyunei Guss, Sleggar Law, Hathaway Noa, Quess Paraya, Johnny Ridden, Rezin Schnyder, and Kayra Su.

== Reception ==
Reception

Aggregate score
Aggregator	Score
Metacritic	(X360) 65/100 (PS3) 58/100

Review scores
Publication	Score
Eurogamer	8/10
GamePro	3/5
IGN	4.5/10

Dynasty Warriors: Gundam 3 received mixed reviews, gaining an aggregated score of 58/100 based on 18 critics for the PlayStation 3, and 65/100 based on 26 critics for the Xbox 360. IGN gave the PS3 version a scathing review, citing lack of content and "repetitive bullshit" in the game. By contrast, GamePro commended the game for its "excellent cel-shaded graphics" and intact Japanese audio, but they criticized the controls and repetitive gameplay. Finally, Eurogamer gave the game 8 out of 10 stating "If you have never tried a Musou game before, this is where you should start."
