= Mobile Suit Gundam 00 (video game) =

2008 video game

- Cover of Mobile Suit Gundam 00
- Developer: BEC
- Publisher: Namco Bandai Games
- Series: Mobile Suit Gundam
- Platform: Nintendo DS
- Release: JP: March 27, 2008
- Genre: Action
- Mode: Single player

Mobile Suit Gundam 00 (機動戦士ガンダム00, Kidou Senshi Gandamu Daburu O), is a 3D action video game for the Nintendo DS based on the anime, Mobile Suit Gundam 00. The game involves four main characters who control their mobile suits, performing interventions against various conflicts around the world. It was developed by BEC, and published by Namco Bandai Games.

== Gameplay ==
There are four main parts to the gameplay: discussion, mission choice, getting ready for battle, and mission itself. Starting off with the setting, players will commence dialogue and retrieve information to continue the plot although this is optional and can be skipped. Then, players choose a mission to accept. Players are able to choose a Gundam Meister of their choice, with a gundam that may be suited for the mission. The aim of the game is to deplete the military strength, represented by a health bar, of the three nations which dominate the world: the Union, Advance European Union and the Human Reform League. Each of the pilots have an advantage against their home nation except for Tieria who has a small advantage against each bloc.

There are two types of missions: scenario and normal. Scenario missions follow the anime plot whereas normal missions are interventions not shown in the anime. Normal missions can be unlocked by completing certain scenario missions. There are a total of 23 scenario and 30 normal missions. Within scenario missions, there are a number of bosses that may require the user to either complete the missions as well as beat them. There are a total of 7 different endings: one good, one normal, and 5 bad endings. Good ending is selected when all Union, Human Reform League, and AEU lose almost all of their army, and lets the player face the three Trinity Gundam meisters. Then battle simulation 3 appears when starting a new game, which lets the player face the Trinity Gundam meisters once again.

There are two unlockable mobile suits in the game. After beating the game twice, the option of three battle simulations becomes available. Face all four, including the character, Celestial Being Gundam meisters in battle simulation 2 to unlock Gundam Exia Roll Out Colour Ver., as well as Gundam Nadleeh. While in the confirmation screen, holding "down and the select button" while selecting "Setsuna F Seiei" lets the user to play as Exia Roll Out Colour Ver., and selecting "Tieria Erde" while holding "down and the select button" allows the player to play as Nadleeh instead of Virtue.

=== GUNPLA Navi ===
There is a special mode, first time in all of Gundam games, called GUNPLA NAVI, which provides advice on how to create and customize real Gundam models (aka Gunpla) that are sold by Bandai in Japan. There's a lesson and also some information on Mobile Suit Gundam 00 edition Gundam models. In the lesson, on the top screen, the image of Gundam parts are shown. Few of them show the comparison between the before and after image of them. On the bottom screen, descriptions of the parts shown, and the instructions and advice to get the image shown in the top screen.

There are also FG Series, HG Series, Others, and HCM-Pro Series gallery. The information in the navi are from at the time of January 2009. FG Series gallery shows Exia, Dynames, Kyrios, and Virtue models. HG Series gallery also shows them but with the addition of Tieren, Union Flag, and Graham Aker's Union Flag Custom models. In Others, 1/100 Exia and Dynames models, as well as 1/60 Exia model is shown. And in HEM-Pro Series gallery, Exia, Dynames, Kyrios, and Virtue models are shown. All galleries show the model from front and rear, as well as in some of their action pose, and ends with a brief description of the cost and others.

== Mobile suits and characters ==
Exia facing Throne Drei.

- GN-001 Gundam Exia piloted by Setsuna F. Seiei.
- GN-002 Gundam Dynames piloted by Lockon Stratos.
- GN-003 Gundam Kyrios piloted by Allelujah Haptism.

- Can be transformed into a mobile armour.

- GN-005 Gundam Virtue piloted by Tieria Erde.

The following are unlockable after fulfilling certain requirements:

- GN-001 Gundam Exia (Rollout Colour Ver.) piloted by Setsuna F. Seiei.

- Unlocked after completing Battle Simulation 2.

- GN-004 Gundam Nadleeh piloted by Tieria Erde.

- Unlocked after completing Battle Simulation 2.

=== Boss characters and mobile suits ===
- AEU-09 AEU Enact piloted by Patrick Colasour.
- SVMS-01 Union Flag and SVMS-01E Graham's Union Flag Custom piloted by Graham Aker.
- MSJ-06 II-C Tieren High Mobility Type and MSJ-06 II-E Tieren Space Type piloted by Sergei Smirnov
- AEU-09 AEU Enact and AEU Enact (Ali Al-Saachez custom) piloted by Ali Al-Saachez.
- MSJ-06 II-SP Tieren Taozi piloted by Soma Peries.
- GNW-001 Gundam Throne Eins piloted by Johann Trinity.
- GNW-002 Gundam Throne Zwei piloted by Michael Trinity.
- GNW-003 Gundam Throne Drei piloted by Nena Trinity.

=== Supporting characters ===
Supporting characters, who will help the player gain some advantage during the missions, are available at the time of mission selection. Supporting characters may be used more than once but you'll need to wait a few days in order to use them again. There are a total of 12 supporting characters.

== Pre-order edition ==
A special gundam model, 1/144 FG "Gundam Exia Rollout Colour Ver." (ガンダムエクシア ロールアウトカラー), was included in all pre-order versions. This is the first time for a Gundam video game to have an official privilege for pre-ordering.
