= Expelled from Paradise =

2014 Japanese animated science fiction film

- Theatrical release poster
- Directed by: Seiji Mizushima
- Screenplay by: Gen Urobuchi
- Produced by: Kouichi Noguchi
- Starring: Rie Kugimiya; Shin-ichiro Miki; Hiroshi Kamiya; Megumi Hayashibara; Minami Takayama; Kotono Mitsuishi; Kenta Miyake; Daichi Otomo; Hisao Egawa; Noriko Uemura; Tōru Furuya
- Cinematography: Koujirou Hayashi
- Edited by: Masato Yoshitake
- Music by: Narasaki
- Production companies: Toei Animation; Graphinica
- Distributed by: T-Joy
- Release date: November 15, 2014 (Japan)
- Running time: 104 minutes
- Country: Japan
- Language: Japanese

Expelled from Paradise (Japanese: 楽園追放, Hepburn: Rakuen Tsuihō) is a 2014 Japanese anime science fiction film. The film is directed by Seiji Mizushima, with a screenplay written by Gen Urobuchi. The film was produced by Toei Animation and animated by Graphinica, and was distributed by T-Joy.

The film had its first public showing in Europe at the Swedish anime-convention ConFusion on December 11, 2014. Seiji Mizushima attended the event himself, partaking in a stage-show, Q&A and other activities.

The film was distributed in the United States by Aniplex of America and was shown in 15 theaters across the country on December 13, 2014.

== Plot ==
Angela Balzac is an agent at the space station DEVA, whose inhabitants have no physical bodies, their minds digitized and processed into a virtual reality environment. After failing to track down the hacker known as "Frontier Setter", who had infiltrated DEVA's systems dozens of times to gather allies for his cause with no success, she is tasked to look for him down on Earth, now a barren planet where less than 2% of the human population lives. After being given a cloned, organic body and sent to the surface, Angela meets Dingo, her contact on Earth, who cuts off all communications with her base, in order to prevent Frontier Setter from discovering their location as well, despite her protests.

Because of Angela's inexperience with organic life, she neglects food and rest and becomes sick, so Dingo cares for her until she gets well. As time passes, she begins to appreciate things deemed unnecessary in DEVA like food and music.

Angela and Dingo's investigations lead them to an abandoned city, where they meet Frontier Setter, who is revealed to be an artificial intelligence system developed to supervise the construction of Genesis Ark, a ship designed for deep space travel, and somehow developed consciousness, continuing its work long after its masters perished and trying without success to recruit volunteers from DEVA to join its space mission. Realizing that Frontier Setter intends to do no harm at all, Angela leaves her body and reports to her superiors at DEVA, who order her to destroy it, fearing that it may eventually become a threat, but she refuses. Angela is branded a traitor and sentenced to have her mind stored into an archive forever, but Frontier Setter hacks into the system to rescue her. Once Angela returns to Earth and her body with supplies and weaponry, she and Dingo join forces to hold back DEVA's other agents long enough for a rocket to be launched carrying Frontier Setter and the final module of the Genesis Ark. Frontier Setter offers for Angela to join it in space, but she chooses to stay with Dingo to experience more of Earth. Angela and Dingo then escape, while Frontier Setter starts its journey through space.

== Voice cast ==
Character	Japanese	English
Angela Balzac	Rie Kugimiya	Wendee Lee
Dingo (Zarik Kajiwara)	Shin-ichiro Miki	Steve Blum
Frontier Setter	Hiroshi Kamiya	Johnny Yong Bosch
Christin Gillum	Megumi Hayashibara	Brina Palencia
Veronica Kulikova	Minami Takayama	Megan Hollingshead
Hilde Thorwald	Kotono Mitsuishi	Dorothy Fahn
High Official A	Minoru Inaba	Beau Billingslea
High Official B	Hisao Egawa	Kirk Thornton
High Official C	Noriko Uemura	Dorothy Fahn
Isaac	Kenta Miyake	Beau Billingslea
Lazlo	Daichi Endo	Patrick Seitz
Arhan	Chika Anzai	Cristina Vee
Alonzo Percy	Toru Furuya	Doug Erholtz

== Production ==
=== Development ===
Expelled from Paradise was developed as a joint cinematic project by Toei Animation and Nitroplus. The film is directed by Seiji Mizushima following his work on directing well known anime series such as Fullmetal Alchemist and Mobile Suit Gundam 00. Gen Urobuchi, known for writing the script of Puella Magi Madoka Magica and creating the light novel Fate/Zero, was selected as the script writer.

== Marketing ==
=== Previews ===
A trailer titled "Diva Communication" was released on the official website on September 30, 2013.

== Sequels ==
A sequel film titled Expelled from Paradise: Resonance from the Heart (楽園追放 心のレゾナンス, Rakuen Tsuihō: Kokoro no Rezonansu) was revealed at Toei Animation's "Virtual Anime Fes" livestream event on January 27, 2024. It was released on November 13, 2026.

A sequel visual novel titled Expelled from Paradise: The Stellar Angel (楽園追放 -The Stellar Angel-, Rakuen Tsuihō: The Stellar Angel) was revealed by Toei Animation on May 14, 2026. The game is developed by Studio51 and is set to be released on November 26 for Nintendo Switch and PC, in Japanese and English.
