= Celestial being =

Celestial being may refer to:

- A sky deity
- An angel
- One of beings residing in the upper worlds of the wheel of life in Dharmic religions (Deva or Brahmā)
- Extraterrestrial life
- Celestial Being (Mobile Suit Gundam 00), a fictional organization
  - "Celestial Being" (Mobile Suit Gundam 00 episode)
