= List of Mobile Suit Gundam 00 episodes =

Cover of the first volume of the DVD release by Bandai Visual.

The Mobile Suit Gundam 00 anime television series premiered on October 6, 2007, replacing Toward the Terra's timeslot on the terrestrial networks MBS and TBS, occupying the networks' notable Saturday 6:00 p.m. timeslot. The first season ended its run on March 29, 2008. The second season was broadcast in the MBS and TBS Sunday 5:00 p.m. slot since October 5, 2008. The second season ended its run on March 29, 2009. The English dub of the first season premiered on Syfy (spelled as Sci Fi at the time; the network was renamed to Syfy halfway through the second season's broadcast) on November 24, 2008, at 11:00 p.m. ET/PT and ended on February 9, 2009. The English dub of the second season premiered on Syfy on June 29, 2009, at 11:00 p.m. ET/PT and concluded on September 21, 2009.

The official DVDs of Mobile Suit Gundam 00 had been released with 7 volumes on January 25, February 22, March 25, April 25, May 23, June 25 and July 25 of 2008. Blu-ray DVDs of Mobile Suit Gundam 00 had been released so far with Volumes 1 and 2 on August 22, Volume 3 on September 22 and Volume 4 on October 24 of 2008.

From episodes 1–13, the first opening theme is "Daybreak's Bell" performed by L'Arc-en-Ciel, while the first ending theme is "Wana" (罠; lit. "The Trap") performed by the Back Horn. From episodes 14–25, the second opening theme is "Ash Like Snow" performed by the Brilliant Green, while from the second ending theme is "Friends" performed by Stephanie. From episodes 26–38, the third opening theme is "Hakanaku mo Towa no Kanashi" (儚くも永久のカナシ) performed by Uverworld, while the third ending theme is "Prototype" performed by Chiaki Ishikawa. From episodes 39–50, the fourth opening theme is Namida no Mukou (泪のムコウ) performed by Stereopony, while the fourth ending theme is "Trust You" performed by Yuna Ito. For episodes 25 and 50, the ending theme is "Daybreak's Bell". For episodes 19 and 24, "Love Today", performed by Taja, was used as an insert song. For episode 43, "Unlimited Sky", performed by Tommy Heavenly6, was used as an insert song.

== Series overview ==
Season	Episodes	Originally released	
Season	Episodes	First released	Last released
1	25	October 6, 2007	March 29, 2008
2	25	October 5, 2008	March 29, 2009

== Episodes ==
=== Season 1 (2007–08) ===
No. overall	No. in season	Title	Directed by	Storyboarded by	Original release date	English air date
1	1	"Celestial Being"; Transliteration: "Soresutaru Bīingu" (Japanese: ソレスタルビーイング)	Masaki Kitamura	Ken Ōtsuka & Seiji Mizushima	October 6, 2007	November 24, 2008
Celestial Being, a paramilitary organization dedicated to eradicating war, begins demonstrating the power of their new "Gundam" mobile suits by interrupting the Advanced European Union's (AEU) public demonstration of its latest unit, the Enact. Setsuna F. Seiei, piloting the Gundam Exia, easily disables the AEU Enact, piloted by Patrick Colasour. Pursuing the Exia, the AEU reveals hidden mobile suits in the space elevator, and in an operation, Celestial Being protects the Human Reform League's Space Elevator "Tenchu" from being attacked by terrorists attempting to launch rockets upon it. Their actions garner global attention and various TV news channels soon broadcast a public statement by Aeolia Schenberg stating that Celestial Being's goal is to eradicate conflict from the face of the Earth.
2	2	"Gundam Meisters"; Transliteration: "Gandamu Maisutā" (Japanese: ガンダムマイスター)	Naomichi Yamato	Iwao Teraoka	October 13, 2007	November 24, 2008
The three major world bodies discuss the possible origins and impact of Celestial Being. The Gundams make their combat debut in Ceylon where Lockon Stratos leads the Gundams in taking on the Human Reform League and rebel Sri Lankan forces. Meanwhile, JNN reporter Kinue Crossroad stumbles upon Aeolia Schenberg's origins and Union ace pilot Graham Aker ambushes Setsuna to sate his curiosity about the Gundams.
3	3	"The Changing World"; Transliteration: "Kawaru Sekai" (Japanese: 変わる世界)	Akira Yoshimura	Minoru Ōhara & Seiji Mizushima	October 20, 2007	December 1, 2008
Setsuna dispatches Graham with ease, the latter being caught off guard by the Gundams' advanced technology while Tieria returns to space with Gundam Virtue. The Union Army creates the Anti-Gundam Investigative Task Force, transferring Graham and Billy Katagiri from the MSWAD as official members. Meanwhile, Celestial Being launches surprise attacks in South Africa, over Taribia (formerly Venezuela and Guyana) in South America, and Ceylon. Setsuna faces off against the Human Reform League's Colonel Sergei Smirnov during an attack against HRL mobile suits. Everything seems to go as Celestial Being planned when a JNN broadcast reveals various militant factions in North Ireland have signed a peace treaty, ending years of fighting between themselves, the British Army and the PSNI.
4	4	"International Negotiation"; Transliteration: "Taigai Sesshō" (Japanese: 対外折衝)	Shigeru Ueda	Kō Matsuo	October 27, 2007	December 1, 2008
Colonel Sergei returns to the Human Reform League to head a new squad designated for capturing one of the Gundams, with bio-engineered human Soma Peries as his designated subordinate. Encouraged by Celestial Being's anti-conflict actions, Taribia declares its withdrawal from the Union and independence over the control of energy resources, prompting a Union military response and forcing Celestial Being to intervene. In Azadistan (in the territory of Iran), Shirin Bakhtiar explains to First Princess Marina Ismail the conflict is not as simple as it may first seem. Pro-Taribian separatist politicians led by its prime minister are forced to drop their bid for independence after their forces are defeated by the Gundam Meisters, who consider the separatists responsible for the conflict.
5	5	"Escape Limit Zone"; Transliteration: "Genkai Ridatsu Ryōiki" (Japanese: 限界離脱領域)	Akihiro Enomoto	Akihiro Enomoto	November 3, 2007	December 8, 2008
Colonel Sergei tests a new mobile suit built for Soma. The Kyrios' pilot, Allelujah Haptism, and Soma experience a strange connection brought on by their proximity to each other, causing Soma to go into a fit of rage and fire shots randomly at the space elevator, severing a section containing civilians. On board the elevator, Allelujah experiences another side of himself but regains his composure and runs off. Sergei attempts to save the civilians before they drift past the Escape Limit Zone and into the Earth's atmosphere, but his mobile suit is ill-equipped. Allelujah, piloting the Kyrios, arrives to aid the Colonel and saves the civilians, but at the cost of revealing Gundam Dynames' Extreme Long-Range GN Sniper Rifle.
6	6	"Seven Swords"; Transliteration: "Sebun Sōdo" (Japanese: セブンソード)	Masaki Kitamura	Masaki Kitamura	November 10, 2007	December 8, 2008
The Republic of Moralia in southeastern France (present day Principality of Monaco) and a member of the AEU, has placed its military in joint exercises with French-led AEU forces, including Patrick Colasour, with more than 100 mobile suits. Marina heads to France to request humanitarian assistance, despite the incomplete status of the AEU's Orbital Elevator. Meanwhile, Celestial Being's Gundam Meisters disrupt the exercises, taking on both Moralian and AEU mobile suits. Setsuna is surprised when he takes on Ali Al-Saachez, a figure from his past, in a custom-made AEU Enact prototype.
7	7	"Unrewarded Souls"; Transliteration: "Mukuwarenu Tamashii" (Japanese: 報われぬ魂)	Naomichi Yamato	Iwao Teraoka	November 17, 2007	December 15, 2008
The Gundam Meisters defeat the Moralian Army, despite an earlier attempt by Setsuna to confirm if Ali was in the AEU Enact prototype he recently fought. Their actions force the Moralian military to surrender to the Meisters after the previous state of emergency is declared. While Setsuna is reprimanded by Lockon and Tieria for placing all of Celestial Being in danger by potentially exposing all their identities, an unknown terrorist group simultaneously bombs various nations as a warning to Celestial Being, threatening more indiscriminate events unless the group disbands.
8	8	"Indiscriminate Retaliation"; Transliteration: "Musabetsu Hōfuku" (Japanese: 無差別報復)	Akira Yoshimura	Shinichiro Kimura	November 24, 2007	December 15, 2008
The Gundam Meisters investigate the terrorists responsible for the bombings in the Union, HRL and AEU. In Scotland, Setsuna attempts to capture one of the bombers, but is nearly apprehended by a Scottish Authorised Firearms Officer after firing his pistol. Marina Ismail, on a world tour to obtain support for Azadistan, intervenes and in their encounter, Setsuna reveals to her his identity as a Gundam Meister and hatred of Azadistan for waging war on his homeland of Krugis. The Meisters attacks La Edenra, a European-based conservative party group, in South America and in the Marshall Islands, based on information leaked out in the Internet by the DGSE, the BND, and the NRO.
9	9	"The Honor of a Great Power"; Transliteration: "Taikoku no Ishin" (Japanese: 大国の威信)	Shigeru Ueda	Shigeru Ueda	December 1, 2007	December 22, 2008
Four months since Celestial Being's first intervention, the Gundam Meisters have been involved in over sixty intervention operations; as the world begins to change around them, the crew aboard the Ptolemeios and the Gundam Meisters have some time to themselves. Lockon and crew member Feldt Grace reveal Celestial Being and the Meisters have a far older history than originally thought. In Azadistan, a United Nations delegation led by Alejandro Corner meets with Marina and other Azadistani officials. The HRL releases a web of comm detection devices to find the Gundams in space, catching the Ptolemeios crew off-guard. Ill-prepared for the attack, Celestial Being fights back; Sumeragi matches wits against Sergei and a battle ensues around the Solar Satellites System.
10	10	"Operation Gundam Capture"; Transliteration: "Gandamu Rokaku Sakusen" (Japanese: ガンダム鹵獲作戦)	Akihiro Enomoto	Akihiro Enomoto	December 8, 2007	December 22, 2008
The HRL's operation against Celestial Being continues. Allelujah again becomes disoriented by his proximity to Soma, resulting in the capture of the Kyrios. Tieria arrives to find the Kyrios within a transport vessel, but the Virtue is overwhelmed as he attempts to destroy the escaping vessel. Meanwhile, Allelujah's alter-ego, Hallelujah, awakens and destroys the transport ship he is in; Soma and Sergei escape before he gets a chance to face them. The battles end in a Pyrrhic victory for both sides; Tieria has revealed one of Celestial Being's greatest secrets: the Gundam Nadleeh, while the HRL loses many mobile suits in return. With the near capture of the Kyrios and Ptolemaios' close escape, Celestial Being is shaken to the core with the majority of its members saddened by the experience.
11	11	"Allelujah"; Transliteration: "Areruya" (Japanese: アレルヤ)	Masaki Kitamura	Masaki Kitamura	December 15, 2007	December 29, 2008
Allelujah decides to face his past and proposes a mission to destroy the facility where he was "created". Sumeragi accepts and launches the Exia and Dynames to attack South Africa as a diversion while the Kyrios and Virtue assault the HRL colony where the illegal experiments on children are conducted. Flashbacks of Allelujah's turbulent past is shown as he grapples with the decision to open fire on the experimental lab. Eventually, with Hallelujah taunting him, Allelujah destroys the facility. Celestial Being leaks information on the experiments to the media, turning it into an international incident and a public relations disaster for the HRL. Sergei becomes aware of the experiments and detains one of the scientists responsible, who also tried to cover it up. Kinue continues her investigation into Aeolia Schenberg, delving deeper into the mysteries surrounding Celestial Being's founder.
12	12	"To the Limits of Holy Teachings"; Transliteration: "Kyōgi no Hate ni" (Japanese: 教義の果てに)	Kazuki Tsunoda	Kazuki Tsunoda	December 22, 2007	December 29, 2008
An Imam named Massad Rachmadi is kidnapped by an unknown militant group, which leads to riots in the Azadistani populations against the military called in to guard the city. Celestial Being and the Union Army begin to intervene when radical factions in the Azadistani military attack loyalist forces guarding the Solar Antenna to link up with the Orbital Elevator. As Celestial Being and Graham's forces grudgingly face off against rebel mobile suits, Setsuna is forced to re-live the events of his traumatic past.
13	13	"Return of the Saint"; Transliteration: "Seija no Kikan" (Japanese: 聖者の帰還)	Kenji Nagasaki	Kenji Nagasaki	January 5, 2008	January 5, 2009
With the whereabouts of Massad Rachmadi unknown, Azadistan falls into a state of civil unrest. Reviewing the previous battle, Lockon reveals the possibility that there may be a third party aside from the Union-Azadistan forces and Celestial Being. After eavesdropping on Graham and Billy investigating the possible site of where missiles had been launched by Ali al-Saachez, Setsuna deduces the location of where Ali's terrorist forces are located. Setsuna and Lockon, with the assistance of Hong Long, attack the terrorist hideout. Setsuna manages to hold his own against Ali, who escapes from the battle, while Lockon and Hong Long rescues Rachmadi. Deciding to display a show of bravado, Celestial Being authorizes Setsuna to deliver Rachmadi to the Azadistan royal palace with the Exia unarmed. Despite pressure from present Union and Azadistan forces, the hostage release is successful. Marina asks the pilot of Exia if he is truly Setsuna, to which Setsuna vaguely encourages Marina to take up the fight for peace in Azadistan.
14	14	"Dawn of Determination"; Transliteration: "Ketsui no Asa" (Japanese: 決意の朝)	Naomichi Yamato	Naomichi Yamato & Seiji Mizushima	January 12, 2008	January 5, 2009
With the Ptolemaios undergoing maintenance, the members of Celestial Being take a day off on Earth. Meanwhile, the Union, AEU, and the HRL holds a secret meeting to discuss plans for "Project G", a special initiative to capture the Gundams under the guise of a joint military exercise. Information later comes in that forces from the three supernations will converge in the Taklamakan Desert with a high risk of spreading nuclear radiation around the world if careful measures are not taken. Celestial Being decides to intervene, fully knowing the true objective of the enemy's plans and that they are not only extremely outnumbered, but that they may not return at all. Meanwhile, Setsuna takes a short detour to Azadistan to ask and listen to Marina's opinion of why the world is so distorted.
15	15	"Broken Wings"; Transliteration: "Oreta Tsubasa" (Japanese: 折れた翼)	Shigeru Ueda	Yukio Nishimoto	January 19, 2008	January 12, 2009
As planned, Celestial Being attacks the Project G staging area in the Taklamakan Desert. The four Gundam Meisters are ambushed by at least a thousand mobile suits from the Union, AEU, and the HRL for more than 15 hours with no food and water. Exhausted and pushed to the limit, the Meisters find themselves pitted against ace pilots sent from the allied forces, with the intent of capturing them. One by one, the Gundams are defeated and captured until only Setsuna remains. Just as he is about to be killed by Ali al-Saachez, a mysterious mobile suit emitting red wing-like GN particles appears and drives the enemy away.
16	16	"Trinity"; Transliteration: "Toriniti" (Japanese: トリニティ)	Masaki Kitamura	Masaki Kitamura	January 26, 2008	January 12, 2009
Three new mobile suits, piloted by Trinity siblings Johann, Michael, and Nena, appear on the battlefield and reveal themselves as the Gundam Throne Eins, Zwei, and Drei. Caught off-guard by the new Gundams' arrival, the Project G units are forced to retreat. To secure an escape route, Gundam Throne Drei covers the entire region in GN particles, causing havoc with enemy communications and preventing a counterattack. After escaping from the Taklamakan, the rescued Gundam Meisters are anxious about the new units and disturbed about not knowing of their existence. While world leaders despair at the appearance of the new Gundams, Alejandro Corner attends an anonymous conference with the other Celestial Being "observers" to review their activities and to discuss the acknowledgement of the Thrones. Aboard their spaceship, the Trinity siblings meet the Ptolemaios and the Gundam Meisters.
17	17	"Assault of the Thrones"; Transliteration: "Surōne Kyōshū" (Japanese: スローネ強襲)	Akihiro Enomoto	Akihiro Enomoto	February 2, 2008	January 19, 2009
The Trinity siblings meet the Ptolemaios crew, and declare themselves as allies working independently of the current Meisters. However, they reveal little information about themselves and their Gundams while Nena and Michael nearly provoke a fight with the Meisters, leaving the first meeting with strained results and high tensions between both sides. Fortunately, Sumeragi has engineer Ian Vashti secretly inspect the Gundam Thrones. At the Union MSWAD base, Professor Eifman discovers the origins of the Gundams' GN technology, but dies when the Thrones completely level the base. Captain Graham and remaining members of the OverFlags soon arrive and engages the Throne Zwei, but they pull out after one of their members, Howard Mason, is killed. The Thrones' armed intervention greatly concerns the crew of the Ptolemaios, leaving Setsuna to question whether the Trinity siblings are really Gundam Meisters.
18	18	"The Aim of Evil Intents"; Transliteration: "Akui no Hokosaki" (Japanese: 悪意の矛先)	Kenji Nagasaki	Kenji Nagasaki	February 9, 2008	January 19, 2009
Several military bases around the world are destroyed by the Thrones' assaults. Their aggressive tactics prompt closer observation by Celestial Being and the Gundam Meisters. The crew of the Ptolemaios investigate the Thrones and their origins, including the possibility that the supercomputer Veda is hacked by an outsider to acquire the technology behind the GN Drive. On the civilian forefront, Kinue obtains a new lead in her investigation. An unprovoked civilian attack by Nena on a wedding in Spain forces Saji Crossroad to race to Spain after Louise is severely injured in the attack, resulting in one of her hands to be amputated. In another armed intervention at a Union weapons factory owned by the Iris Corporation, the Thrones kill 800 civilian employees, infuriating Setsuna as he races off in the Exia to confront the Thrones on his own, on the grounds that they are supporting armed conflicts.
19	19	"Bonds"; Transliteration: "Kizuna" (Japanese: 絆)	Shigeru Ueda	Shinichiro Kimura & Seiji Mizushima	February 16, 2008	January 26, 2009
Tieria and Lockon join Setsuna in fighting the Gundam Thrones. Tieria reveals the Gundam Nadleeh's Trial System that can disable any mobile suit linked with Veda. However, the Thrones manage to escape after someone hacks Veda to disable the Trial System, while informing Lockon of Setsuna's status as a former child soldier of the KPSA, the terrorist organization responsible for the death of Lockon's family. Lockon confronts Setsuna, but his explanation of his past as Soran Ibrahim and his conviction to end warfare as Setsuna F. Seiei defuses the situation. Meanwhile, Louise asks Saji to return to Japan to fulfill his dream as an aerospace engineer and to move on, while Kinue's new lead refers to the president of the corporation constructing linear elevators for the Orbital Elevators. A member of Celestial Being tips off Alejandro and Ribbons about a facility in Antarctica housing 30 GN Drives.
20	20	"Blade of Reformation"; Transliteration: "Henkaku no Yaiba" (Japanese: 変革の刃)	Kazuki Tsunoda	Kazuki Tsunoda	February 23, 2008	January 26, 2009
The three superpowers agree to form a combined military force under UN command to eliminate Celestial Being. The 30 GN Drives found in Antarctica are installed in new GN-X mobile suits, with each of the superpowers getting ten apiece. Meanwhile, Kinue encounters Ali al-Saachez, who kills her for digging too deep about his involvement with the Gundams. Wang Liu Mei throws her support behind the Trinity siblings and Sumeragi tells Ian to retrieve the GN Arms. The Thrones attack an HRL military installation, but are forced to retreat when they are overwhelmed by the HRL's new GN-X squadron. In the meantime, Alejandro reveals his plan to overthrow Celestial Being, with Veda being his main obstacle. Landing in a secret facility on the moon, he and Ribbons gain access to the room containing Veda's main supercomputer core.
21	21	"Path of Destruction"; Transliteration: "Horobi no Michi" (Japanese: 滅びの道)	Naomichi Yamato	Naomichi Yamato, Kazuki Tsunoda & Seiji Mizushima	March 1, 2008	February 2, 2009
Saji mourns the loss of his sister, aware only that her investigations into Celestial Being were responsible for her death. The Trinity siblings launch a brief counterattack that destroys one GN-X after their compound's location is revealed. The UN Army continues its assault on Celestial Being by attacking the Ptolemaios in space. Alejandro Corner learns that the GN-Xs were created by Laguna Harvey, who is later assassinated by Ali. During the battle, Alejandro accesses Veda and deactivates the Meisters' GN Drives, leaving them defenseless. However, Sumeragi anticipates this and activates a backup system; every unit except Virtue is able to reactivate. Seeing Tieria's crippled state, Patrick Colasour goes for the killing blow. Lockon intercepts the attack, but is severely injured. The battle ends with the UN Army retreating after losing two of their GN-X units, thanks to the timely arrival of the GN Arms. Despite the withdrawal, the AEU, the Union, and HRL consider the mission a success and begin research into mass-producing the GN Drive.
22	22	"Trans-Am"; Transliteration: "Toranz-Amu" (Japanese: トランザム)	Masaki Kitamura	Masaki Kitamura	March 8, 2008	February 2, 2009
As Lockon recovers from his injuries, the UN Army announces "Operation Fallen Angel," a final offensive to destroy the Gundams. The HRL's Choubu Squadron continues to harass the exhausted Trinity siblings. Observing the situation on the Ptolemaios, the Meisters wonder if they must be destroyed to finally end war. Setsuna, wanting to learn the true purpose of the Gundams and following Lockon's suggestion that the HRL's attacks on Team Trinity requires armed intervention on Celestial Being's part, goes down to Earth with Lasse in the GN Arms. Meanwhile, Ali al-Saachez deceives Team Trinity and hijacks the Throne Zwei after killing Michael, then destroys the Throne Eins with Johann inside. Ali prepares to finish off Nena, but Setsuna arrives and engages in melee combat with Ali in the stolen Throne. On the Moon, Alejandro gains control of Veda and discovers Aeolia Schenberg in cryostasis. Taking out a golden gun, Alejandro fires repeatedly into Aeolia's capsule, but his actions set off a system trap. The trap unlocks the 'Trans-Am System' on the four original Gundams, giving them access to the full power and capabilities of their GN Drives. With the Trans-Am System, Setsuna is able to drive off Ali.
23	23	"Stop the World"; Transliteration: "Sekai o Tomete" (Japanese: 世界を止めて)	Kenji Nagasaki	Kenji Nagasaki	March 15, 2008	February 2, 2009
Alejandro Corner, after setting off Aeolia Schenberg's trap, becomes enraged by how Aeolia outsmarted him even in death. The Ptolemaios' crew finish repairing Dynames and pick up another GN Arms. The crew discuss the Trans-Am system, noting that the extreme boost in performance only lasts for a short time and drains GN particles in the process. While returning to the Ptolemaios, Setsuna detects an inbound UN assault force of GN-Xs and the Throne Zwei. The Gundams are eventually overwhelmed by the GN-Xs, but the situation changes when the Meisters activate their Trans-Am systems. Dynames soon arrives with the GN Arms and destroys more GN-X suits and two UN carrier ships, but the Throne Zwei destroys the GN Arms before the final blow can be dealt. When the Dynames is heavily damaged after a vicious duel with Ali, Lockon abandons his suit to continue the fight, determined to avenge his family. Using an intact cannon from the GN Arms, Lockon destroys the Throne, but a final shot from Ali damages the cannon. Floating in space, Lockon contemplates the current state of the world and admits his hatred of it long enough before he dies when the cannon explodes.
24	24	"Endless Poem"; Transliteration: "Owarinaki Uta" (Japanese: 終わりなき詩)	Shigeru Ueda	Akihiro Enomoto, Seiji Mizushima, Kenji Nagasaki & Masaki Kitamura	March 22, 2008	February 2, 2009
Setsuna contemplates his memories of Lockon, who vouched for him when he first became a Meister. Tieria blames Setsuna for Lockon's death, but Sumeragi reminds him that their true enemies are still nearby and the crew hurries to repair the Gundams. Meanwhile, having lost over half their GN-Xs and the Throne Zwei, Sergei suggests a withdrawal, but launches a second strike after the UN headquarters sends reinforcements. When Alejandro Corner joins the UN forces in a large, golden mobile armor and fires a massive particle cannon at the Ptolemaios, Setsuna and Lasse attack Alejandro, but could not penetrate his GN shield. While the Kyrios and Nadleeh protect the ship, Alejandro continues to deal heavy damage on the Ptolemaios and the Gundams. One by one, the members of Celestial Being fall in battle. Tieria activates his Trans-Am system and destroys several GN-Xs, but Nadleeh is reduced to its cockpit and GN Drive while in the meantime, Allelujah continues to battle Sergei and Soma in a badly damaged Kyrios. A GN-X slips through and fires directly into the Ptolemaios bridge, killing Christina and Lichtendahl. Sumeragi, Ian, and Feldt manage to escape in one of the Ptolemaios' containers as the carrier is destroyed.
25	25	"Setsuna" (Japanese: 刹那)	Kazuki Tsunoda & Seiji Mizushima	Iwao Teraoka, Kazuki Tsunoda & Seiji Mizushima	March 29, 2008	February 9, 2009
Setsuna continues to struggle against Alejandro with Lasse in the GN Arms. Exia docks with the GN Arms and succeeds in destroying the mobile armor, but the GN Arms is also destroyed. Allelujah, wishing to know the meaning of their fight, unites with Hallelujah to face Sergei and Soma's GN-Xs, but at the end of the battle is shocked to recognize Soma as someone named Marie. With his mobile armor destroyed, Alejandro emerges in a golden mobile suit, the Alvaaron, to continue the fight. Using Exia's seven swords and the Trans-Am system, Setsuna bypasses Alejandro's GN Field and defeats him. Just before the Alvaaron explodes, Ribbons calls up Alejandro, admitting that he is the true mastermind of the whole plot to stop Celestial Being. Graham then appears in his GN Drive-equipped Flag and battles the weakened Exia. Setsuna and Graham finally reveal themselves to each other and trade their views on the Gundams, the world, and each other. At the end of their fight, Graham and Setsuna stab each other's suits which destroys the GN Flag and badly damages Exia. On Earth, Marina reads a letter from Setsuna questioning the current state of the world and how he hoped she would help him find the answers. Four years later, in 2312, Saji is an engineer working in the colony construction business when he glances out into space - and sees the faint light of a Gundam.

=== Season 2 (2008–09) ===
No. overall	No. in season	Title	Directed by	Storyboarded by	Original release date	English air date
26	1	"The Angels' Second Advent"; Transliteration: "Tenshi Sairin" (Japanese: 天使再臨)	Kazuki Tsunoda	Seiji Mizushima & Kazuki Tsunoda	October 5, 2008	June 29, 2009
Due to the conflict between the Katharon rebel group and the Federation's A-Laws task force, the A-Laws raid a colony under construction to arrest several Katharon members and a falsely accused Saji Crossroad, who is then forced to do high gravity labor on the Proud Colony. When the A-Laws intercept Katharon's prisoner rescue and many inmates are killed, Saji is saved by Setsuna F Seiei, who has infiltrated the colony to investigate more about the A-Laws. When Setsuna is unable to hold off the A-Laws' mobile suits in his battered Gundam Exia, Tieria Erde arrives in the Gundam Seravee and drives off the enemy. Saji is brought aboard the Ptolemaios II, but is detained when he, now aware of Setsuna's identity as a Gundam Meister, threatens to kill Setsuna.
27	2	"Twin Drive"; Transliteration: "Tsuin Doraivu" (Japanese: ツインドライヴ)	Masaki Kitamura	Masaki Kitamura	October 12, 2008	June 29, 2009
Setsuna returns to Earth to recruit Lyle Dylandy as the new Lockon Stratos and bring a reluctant Sumeragi Lee Noriega back into Celestial Being. As the three head for space, A-Laws ambushes the Ptolemaios II upon a tip from Ribbons Almark. The Seravee manages to hold them off long enough for Setsuna to start up the previously unstable 00 Gundam and he drives back the A-Laws task force, demonstrating the power of the new Twin Drive System. Back on the Ptolemaios II, the crew welcome back Sumeragi, but are shocked to see Lyle, who is Lockon Stratos' twin brother.
28	3	"Allelujah Rescue Operation"; Transliteration: "Areruya Dakkan Sakusen" (Japanese: アレルヤ奪還作戦)	Kenji Nagasaki	Kenji Nagasaki	October 19, 2008	July 6, 2009
Celestial Being learns that Allelujah Haptism is alive inside a Human Reform League-run prison complex and plan to rescue him and Marina Ismail, but must fight against the A-Laws garrison that has been deployed to back up the HRL forces in the area. With information from Lockon, Katharon guerrillas join the raid to rescue their captured comrades. Before escaping the complex in the Arios Gundam, Allelujah encounters Soma Peries and reveals her real name: Marie Parfacy. Setsuna brings Marina back to the Ptolemaios II after the reunited Meisters escape.
29	4	"A Reason to Fight"; Transliteration: "Tatakau Wake" (Japanese: 戦う理由)	Seiki Takuno	Iwao Teraoka	October 26, 2008	July 6, 2009
After thanking Celestial Being for saving her, Marina convinces the crew to bring her back to Azadistan; while passing through the Strait of Hormuz, the Ptolemaios II runs into the A-Laws navy, which deploys the new Trilobyte underwater mobile armor. Once the Meisters move the battle to the surface, Setsuna and Allelujah are intercepted by Mr. Bushido and Soma in their customized Aheads. Katharon's arrival drives away the A-Laws forces and Marina is reunited with Shirin Bakhtiar, who is a member of Katharon.
30	5	"Homeland Burning"; Transliteration: "Kokoku Moyu" (Japanese: 故国燃ゆ)	Hibari Kurihara	Shigeru Ueda	November 2, 2008	July 13, 2009
Celestial Being arrives at Katharon's Middle East base. Saji, unwilling to remain with either Celestial Being or Katharon, escapes but is captured by an Earth Sphere Federation ship. Sergei Smirnov interrogates him, but releases him when his presence is leaked to the A-Laws and he can no longer guarantee Saji's safety. However, with the information Saji has disclosed, the A-Laws attack the base with Automaton robots, killing both guerrillas and civilians, which furthers Soma and Kati Mannequin's doubt in the A-Laws' actions.
31	6	"Scars"; Transliteration: "Kizuato" (Japanese: 傷痕)	Takahiro Natori	Masaki Kitamura	November 9, 2008	July 13, 2009
Setsuna escorts Marina back to Azadistan, arriving only to find the country burning and Ali Al-Saachez in the midst of it all. The survivors of the Katharon base attack are not happy with the Meisters' arrival. Sumeragi faints after recalling a failed mission where her lover, Emilio, died, leaving the crew of the Ptolemaios II on their own when the A-Laws attack once more - with Allelujah and Setsuna facing off against Soma and Mr. Bushido again. A guilt-ridden Saji, found and brought back to the Ptolemaios II by Tieria after accosting him on his actions before being released by Sergei, decides to help defend the ship as a gunner. Unbeknownst to him, one of his targets turn out to be an approaching GN-X III piloted by Louise Halevy.
32	7	"Reunion and Separation"; Transliteration: "Saikai to Ribetsu to" (Japanese: 再会と離別と)	Kazuki Tsunoda & Seiji Mizushima	Kazuki Tsunoda	November 16, 2008	July 20, 2009
To break his stalemate against Mr. Bushido, Setsuna takes an extreme risk by activating the 00 Gundam's Trans-Am system. Soma's Ahead and the Arios are shot down and declared MIA as both sides are forced to withdraw. Stranded and forced to face each other outside their mobile suits, Soma suffers mental attacks from Allelujah's presence and reverts to her Marie personality. Upon finding them, Sergei eventually decides to let them go and the two are rescued by Lockon. Meanwhile, Marina and the Katharon learn the Federation's plans to reorganize the Middle East and has dissolved all nations, including Azadistan. Tieria encounters Regene Regetta, who reveals their relation and offers to reveal the nature of the Innovators to him.
33	8	"Twistedness of Innocence"; Transliteration: "Muku naru Yugami" (Japanese: 無垢なる歪み)	Masanori Takahashi	Kenji Nagasaki	November 23, 2008	July 20, 2009
During his meeting with Regetta, Tieria learns of the Innovators' ties to Veda and Aeolia Schenberg's complete plan while the A-Laws obtain two new pilots: Patrick Colasour and Innovator Revive Revival. Wishing to know more about the Innovators, Tieria goes undercover to infiltrate a gathering of A-Laws and Federation officials at the recommendation of Wang Liu Mei to discover the true leader behind A-Laws, Ribbons Almark. Disguised as a woman, Tieria meets Ribbons who reveals to him that according to Aeolia's plan, Tieria should have died with the rest of Celestial Being four years ago. Refusing to join the Innovators, Tieria is forced to flee when his attempt to kill Ribbons is halted by another Innovator, Hiling Care. However, out of earshot, Regene reveals that Aeolia was obsessively attached to the first phase of his plan and that the result of the entire plan hinges on the outcome of the conflict between Celestial Being and Ribbons. In the meantime, Setsuna, who was sent as Tieria's backup, is exposed to Louise as a member of Celestial Being by Billy Katagiri and joins Tieria in escaping via their Gundams but face Ali al-Saachez on the way out.
34	9	"The Indelible Past"; Transliteration: "Nuguenu Kako" (Japanese: 拭えぬ過去)	Seiki Takuno	Iwao Teraoka	November 30, 2008	July 27, 2009
Setsuna and Tieria face off against Ali's Arche Gundam, but are sorely outmatched until Allelujah and Lockon arrive. Learning that Ali is the man who killed his brother, Lyle learns the circumstances behind his brother's motivations and Setsuna's involvement with the KPSA, admitting that he doesn't share Neil's need for retribution. The A-Laws attempt to intercept the Ptolemaios II's return to space; the Ptolemaios' successful escape forces Commander Homer Katagiri to accept Innovator assistance to prevent any more sacrifices. Kati sends a message to Celestial Being expressing respect for Leesa Kujo's tactics; Sumeragi realizes that not only is Kati a member of the A-Laws, but she is aware that Sumeragi is Celestial Being's tactical forecaster.
35	10	"Light of Heaven"; Transliteration: "Ten no Hikari" (Japanese: 天の光)	Shigeru Ueda	Shigeru Ueda	December 7, 2008	July 27, 2009
Surviving Katharon members plan for negotiations with the Suille Kingdom, the only country in the Middle East with considerable military power and political will to oppose the A-Laws. Meanwhile, Sumeragi leads Celestial Being in returning to their asteroid base, where Setsuna and Allelujah retrieve the 0-Raiser and the GN Archer. A subsequent test run of combining 00 Gundam's Twin Drive System with the 0-Raiser's Trans-Am System reveals the mobile's suit's true potential, surpassing even Celestial Being's design expectations. Elsewhere, the A-Laws activate the new Memento Mori orbital bombardment laser, destroying the Suille Kingdom's capital and killing the Katharon agents who were negotiating with the Suillean government; Sergei witnesses the atrocity. Marie senses Sergei's immediate danger and Allelujah's alternate Hallelujah personality briefly resurfaces.
36	11	"00's Voice"; Transliteration: "Daburu-ō no Koe" (Japanese: ダブルオーの声)	Masaki Kitamura	Masaki Kitamura	December 14, 2008	August 3, 2009
After the Memento Mori's firing, Katharon begins planning an attack in space to destroy the superweapon. Nena Trinity expresses discontent with Wang Liu Mei for helping the people who killed her brothers. Tieria, after witnessing the devastation, decides to tell his comrades about the Innovators. When A-Laws forces led by Kati attack Celestial Being's asteroid base, everyone are forced to flee and Anew Returner joins the crew as the Ptolemaios II's pilot. During the ensuing battle, Ian Vashti is injured, leaving Saji to deliver the 0-Raiser to the 00 Gundam. The combined unit, the 00-Raiser, is able to easily outperform the A-Laws attackers, but when Setsuna activates the 00-Raiser's Trans-Am system, he and everyone in the area are affected by the particles and are able to hear the voices of everyone in range of the particle output - including Saji and Louise, who are shocked to learn that the other is in the action and on opposing sides.
37	12	"Wait for Me in Space"; Transliteration: "Uchū de Matteru" (Japanese: 宇宙で待ってる)	Kenji Nagasaki	Kenji Nagasaki	December 21, 2008	August 3, 2009
The 00-Raiser's Trans-Am abilities enable it to outclass and outmaneuver the Innovators' mobile suits, forcing them to flee in escape pods as their units are destroyed. In the aftermath of the battle, Ribbons orders Revive Revival and Bring Stabity to capture the 00; the Innovators question Ribbons' true knowledge of Aeolia's plan and the Twin Drive System. Saji, Louise, and Setsuna cope with Saji and Louise's positions on opposing sides; Louise concludes Saji has always been a member of Celestial Being and strives to forget him, while Saji struggles with the decision to fight and save Louise or leave Celestial Being to be with her. After the Memento Mori's second barrage destroys a military base and a nearby refugee camp, Sergei is ordered to force witnesses from the Federation Army to conceal this information. Memento Mori fires again and annihilates half of an incoming Katharon attack force, surprising Celestial Being and Katharon that the weapon can fire into space; without the element of surprise, the operation is at risk.
38	13	"Assault on Memento Mori"; Transliteration: "Memento Mori Kōryakusen" (Japanese: メメントモリ攻略戦)	Masanori Takahashi	Iwao Teraoka	December 28, 2008	August 10, 2009
Katharon's offensive against the Memento Mori goes poorly, with A-Laws' superior units both nullifying the resistance's missile attacks and decimating their obsolete mobile suits. The 00-Raiser's timely arrival saves the fleet from being completely wiped out as Setsuna single-handedly takes on the A-Laws forces and a new Gadessa mobile suit piloted by Hiling. The Ptolemaios II approaches the Memento Mori head-on in its blind spot, but is soon forced into the laser's firing path; however, the ship miraculously survives the attack by using Arios' Trans-Am to dodge, and ensures its safety with Cherudim's new Shield Bit system. Thanks to Nena Trinity's leaked information, Tieria's Buster Cannon and a precise hit from Lockon exploits a weakness in the Memento Mori and destroys the superweapon, taking Arba Lindt's life in the process.
39	14	"I Can Hear a Song"; Transliteration: "Uta ga Kikoeru" (Japanese: 歌が聞こえる)	Seiki Takuno	Seiki Takuno	January 11, 2009	August 10, 2009
After the Memento Mori's destruction, the Ptolemaios II descends to Earth when the Innovators attack them. Revive and Bring pursue the ship as Tieria reveals the Seraphim Gundam hidden in Seravee to kill Bring. Separated from his comrades, Setsuna is lured by Ali into meeting Ribbons, who reveals that he was responsible for saving Setsuna's life as the 0 Gundam's pilot and influencing Veda to ensure Setsuna would become a Gundam Meister. However, Ribbons now intends to claim the 00 Gundam as his own and has arranged for Ali to kill Setsuna. In the heated battle that follows, Setsuna destroys the Arche Gundam with the 00-Raiser's Trans-Am system, but is unable to kill Al-Saachez himself when he suddenly hears Marina singing with the Katharon orphans due to the effects of the Trans-Am. Meanwhile, Sergei learns that the tension between the A-Laws and the Federation Army are festering into an emerging coup d'etat led by his old friend Pang Hercury.
40	15	"Victory Song of the Resistance"; Transliteration: "Hankō no Gaika" (Japanese: 反抗の凱歌)	Shigeru Ueda	Shigeru Ueda	January 18, 2009	August 17, 2009
With assistance and supplies from Katharon, the Ptolemaios II is able to continue repairs in the mountains of Europe. However, they are unable to proceed with their plan to break through the siege laid by the Federation without Setsuna and the 00-Raiser. Meanwhile, Setsuna, who is injured after his fight with Ali, is forced to get medical help at Katharon's Suille base, where he has a brief dream of Neil Dylandy before he finds himself being cared for by Marina. The Ptolemaios II is soon forced to defend itself against an overwhelming number of A-Laws mobile suits, but receives an unexpected respite when the fleet suddenly falls back to deal with Hercury's coup at the AEU's Africa Tower orbital elevator.
41	16	"Prelude to Tragedy"; Transliteration: "Higeki e no Joshō" (Japanese: 悲劇への序章)	Masaki Kitamura	Iwao Teraoka	January 25, 2009	August 17, 2009
Secretly sent by the government to deliver their demands, Sergei learns of Hercury's goal to open the people's eyes to the A-Laws' immoral actions when they attempt to retake the orbital elevator by using their Automatons to kill both rogue troops and the civilian hostages being evacuated down the elevator. However, the government manipulates broadcasts of the automaton assault to make the rebels appear as the ones killing the civilians. Meanwhile, Setsuna is locked in battle with Mr. Bushido and his Trans-Am mode Masurao until the Ptolemaios II and the other Gundam Meisters arrive on the scene. Bushido falls back as Setsuna vows to change for Neil's sake. After analyzing the unusual redeployment of Federation troops around the elevator, Sumeragi and Kati are horrified to realize that the troops are anticipating the elevator's collapse and that the A-Laws plan on completely destroying it. In space, a second Memento Mori prepares to fire at the orbital elevator.
42	17	"Within the Scattering Light"; Transliteration: "Chiriyuku Hikari no Naka de" (Japanese: 散りゆく光の中で)	Kenji Nagasaki	Kenji Nagasaki	February 1, 2009	August 24, 2009
Despite the best efforts of the 00-Raiser to destroy the second Memento Mori, killing Devine Nova in the process, the beam fired from the badly damaged satellite weapon is still sufficient to severely damage the elevator to the point that it sheds its outer shell towards the surface below. The Gundams' efforts to destroy the falling debris are helped by the combined efforts of Marie's GN Archer, Katharon, the Federation Army, and Kati's A-Laws forces after Sumeragi broadcasts an appeal for help. In the aftermath, also helping in the matter with Louise in spite of orders, Sergei Smirnov's son Andrei kills Hercury and associates his father with the coup. Wishing to avenge his mother's death, Andrei destroys Sergei's unit as Marie arrives too late to intervene.
43	18	"Entangled Yearnings"; Transliteration: "Kōsakusuru Omoi" (Japanese: 交錯する想い)	Kazuki Tsunoda	Kazuki Tsunoda & Seiji Mizushima	February 8, 2009	August 24, 2009
Four months after the destruction of the Africa Tower, the world is a different place: the AEU's orbital elevator is rebuilt; the entire Federation military is absorbed into A-Laws and Katharon's members are systematically hunted down. Despite their success in destroying the second Memento Mori, Celestial Being endures wave after wave of A-Laws attacks, thanks to an oblivious Anew's networking with the Innovators. Tieria suggests to the Ptolemaios II crew that the time is right for them to take back Veda. For that purpose, Sumeragi designs a plan to capture an Innovator and the plan begins as the A-Laws attack yet again. Meanwhile, after Ribbons discards Wang Liu Mei, Regene gives her the coordinates to Veda's core with instructions to deliver them to Celestial Being in person.
44	19	"Shadow of the Innovators"; Transliteration: "Inobeitā no Kage" (Japanese: イノベイターの影)	Seiki Takuno	Masaki Kitamura	February 15, 2009	August 31, 2009
In the course of the Ptolemaios II's encounter with an A-Laws task force, Revive is captured after his fight with Tieria. Saji and Louise meet in battle, the two being transported to an alternate reality and Louise is left shaken in her resolve to fight against him. While Sumeragi and the Meisters interrogate Revive, his presence on the ship causes Anew to reveal her allegiance to the Innovators and announces a hijack of the Ptolemaios II as she fires her gun at Lasse Aeon. Wang and Hong Long try to leave Ribbons' hideout to deliver Veda's location to Celestial Being, only to be shot down by Nena Trinity with her Gundam Throne Drei.
45	20	"Anew Returns"; Transliteration: "Anyū Ritān" (Japanese: アニュー·リターン)	Shin'ya Watada	Iwao Teraoka	February 22, 2009	August 31, 2009
After shooting Lasse and taking Mileina Vashti hostage, Anew works with Revive to steal the 00 Gundam and the 0-Raiser for Ribbons. However, Anew is unable to steal 00 when Setsuna and Lockon rescue Mileina, while Revive is forced to give up the 0-Raiser when he is outwitted. They manage to escape, and while Lyle resolves to defeat Anew, Setsuna assures him that he will kill her if the situation calls for it. When Revive, Anew, and Hiling return with new machines, along with Louise in her new Regnant mobile armor, Celestial Being must defend itself without the 00-Raiser. Lyle struggles in the Cherudim against Anew and finally convinces her to return with him, but he is caught off guard when Ribbons takes control of Anew. As she prepares to strike him down, Setsuna appears and shoots her as he promised. In an alternate reality, Lockon and Anew share one final moment together before Anew's suit explodes and kills her. Back on the Ptolemaios II, Lockon takes out his feelings on Setsuna before collapsing in grief.
46	21	"The Door of Change"; Transliteration: "Kakushin no Tobira" (Japanese: 革新の扉)	Shigeru Ueda	Shigeru Ueda	March 1, 2009	September 7, 2009
Setsuna and Saji head out to Lagrange 5 to locate Wang and Hong, who survived Nena Trinity's ambush. Nena intercepts the pair and shoots Hong, who sacrifices himself to allow Wang to escape. Wang gives Setsuna the coordinates to Veda. He returns to the 00-Raiser, where Mr. Bushido challenges him to a duel, revealing himself as Graham Aker. Nena catches up to Wang and kills her. But knowing she would eventually turn on them, Ribbons takes control of Nena's Haro and tells her that someone's coming to deliver judgment on her. Although Nena thinks the person is Ali al-Saachez, it is actually Louise who delivers the killing blow on her, finally avenging the deaths of her parents and relatives at the cost of her sanity. During the duel, Graham and Setsuna appear to each other in a GN particle-induced alternate reality, where Setsuna, exhibiting signs of becoming a purebred Innovator, makes a revelation: Aeolia Schenberg created the GN Drives and Celestial Being for the sole purpose of preparing all of humanity for innovation.
47	22	"For the Future"; Transliteration: "Mirai no Tame ni" (Japanese: 未来のために)	Takahiro Natori	Iwao Teraoka, Kazuki Tsunoda & Seiji Mizushima	March 8, 2009	September 7, 2009
The duel between Setsuna and Graham ends with Setsuna emerging victorious. However, he chooses not to finish off Graham and leaves as he tells him to live for the future. Setsuna and the others review Wang Liu Mei's information and determine that a fierce battle against A-Laws awaits them on the journey to Veda's core at L2. While the Gundams' superior weaponry is able to counter the A-Laws' vast fleet, the A-Laws' particle disruptors remove their advantage. The arrival of Katharon and the coup d'état forces under Kati Mannequin's command throws the A-Laws fleet into disarray. Meanwhile, Ribbons attempts to intervene in Regene's plans by reading his thoughts, but ends up taking a bullet to the head when she shoots him.
48	23	"Flower of Life"; Transliteration: "Inochi no Hana" (Japanese: 命の華)	Seiki Takuno	Masaki Kitamura	March 15, 2009	September 14, 2009
Despite his apparent death, Ribbons emerges and reveals that he used Veda to transfer his consciousness into another body. After dealing with Regene's treachery by having Ali al-Saachez shoot him, Ribbons reveals his massive colony ship to Celestial Being and fires a GN-Drive-powered particle cannon, destroying most of the A-Laws fleet. Celestial Being assaults the Innovators' colony ship and are countered by a swarm of Gaga units, which assume Trans-Am mode and launch waves of kamikaze attacks. In the ensuing battle, Patrick Colasour sacrifices himself to defend Kati's ship and the Seravee is completely wrecked by Hiling and Revive in their new Trans-Am-equipped suits. In the meantime, Setsuna and Saji confront Louise and Andrei; after disabling Andrei's Ahead, Setsuna moves in on the Regnant while Saji contacts Louise. The Ptolemaios II manages to enter the colony under cover from the Arios and GN Archer, but the ship is quickly infiltrated by hordes of automatons. Lockon fights a losing battle against Ali al-Saachez in his rebuilt Arche Gundam, while Soma's GN Archer runs out of particles and is hit by a Gaga unit. Sumeragi heads out to face the automatons swarming the Ptolemaios II, but is shocked to find they are accompanied by Billy Katagiri, the supplier of the Innovators' Trans-Am systems, who then pulls a gun on Sumeragi. Inside Veda's core, Ribbons is stunned that Tieria managed to survive Seravee's destruction and is now facing him at gunpoint.
49	24	"Beyond"	Kenji Nagasaki	Kenji Nagasaki	March 22, 2009	September 14, 2009
The battle between the 00-Raiser and the Regnant comes to its conclusion when a Gaga attacks them both. Surviving the attack, Setsuna has Saji take Louise to safety before Hilling and Revive attack the 00-Raiser. Meanwhile, inside Veda's core, Tieria corners Ribbons and reveals that he knows the truth behind their existence before Ribbons kills him. Elsewhere, Louise finds herself in the company of Saji and attacks him, only to suffer a nervous breakdown upon finding out that he kept his ring. As the battle escalates with Hiling and Revive, Setsuna resorts to the 00-Raiser's Trans-Am system, which triggers his abilities as a pure Innovator and he intercepts the thoughts of his friends, comrades, and enemies. Frustrated with the grim nature of the situation, Setsuna unconsciously activates the 00-Raiser's Trans-Am Burst system and blankets the battlefield in pure GN particles, driving Hiling and Revive off while causing a momentary ceasefire among everyone. Seizing the moment, Setsuna infiltrates the colony and closes in on Veda's position. Meanwhile, Tieria links his mind with Veda, severing Ribbons' own connections and activating the Seraphim Gundam's Trial System to shut down all the Innovators' units. With Veda secured, the forces of Celestial Being wrap up their battles, including Lyle as he kills Ali to avenge his family and gains a new conviction. Setsuna locates Veda's core and finds Tieria dead but no sign of Ribbons. Before he can pursue Ribbons, Tieria reveals his presence inside Veda to Setsuna and explains the entirety of Aeolia Schenberg's plan to him. Setsuna departs for the Ptolemaios but when Ribbons shoots down the Seraphim in his Reborn's Gundam, he prepares to do battle one final time in the 00-Raiser.
50	25	"Rebirth"; Transliteration: "Saisei" (Japanese: 再生)	Kazuki Tsunoda & Seiji Mizushima	Iwao Teraoka, Kazuki Tsunoda & Seiji Mizushima	March 29, 2009	September 21, 2009
In the final confrontation between Setsuna and Ribbons, the 00-Raiser is heavily damaged by Ribbons and the other Innovators; however, assistance from the other Meisters evens the odds. In the ensuing chaos, Allelujah/Hallelujah and Lockon respectively kill Hilling and Revive while Ribbons and Setsuna are exhausted from a round of heavy fighting. However, Ribbons manages to steal one of the 00's GN Drives, which was 0 Gundam's, and puts it into the abandoned 0 Gundam. Setsuna, in turn, takes the remaining GN Drive and installs it in the rebuilt Exia R2. After another difficult duel, Ribbons and Setsuna run through each other with their swords but Setsuna emerges the victor when the 0 Gundam explodes. In the epilogue, the Federation reforms as its new president disbands the A-Laws and pushes for better global peace; Saji and Louise rekindle their relationship; Allelujah and Marie leave Celestial Being to search for the meaning of their existence; Andrei Smirnov stays in the military to preserve peace like his parents; Patrick Colasour and Kati Mannequin (now a brigadier general) get married; Klaus and Shirin work as politicians in the Federation Assembly; Marina returns with the children to lead a rebuilt Azadistan; Graham Aker is seen visiting Billy Katagiri in his office. Setsuna and Lyle, the latter now fully embracing his identity as Lockon, leave with Celestial Being until another armed intervention is needed as Tieria disappears into Veda to watch over the world.
