= Mobile Suit Gundam SEED =

Anime series and spinoffs

- 機動戦士ガンダムSEED(シード)
- Type: TV series
- Genre: Mecha; Military science fiction Romance
- Created by: Hajime Yatate; Yoshiyuki Tomino
- Directed by: Mitsuo Fukuda
- Series composition: Chiaki Morosawa
- Character designers: Hisashi Hirai
- Mechanical designers: Kunio Okawara; Kimitoshi Yamane
- Music by: Toshihiko Sahashi
- Country of origin: Japan
- Original language: Japanese
- No. of episodes: 50 (Note: A total of 48 episodes were produced for the HD Remaster.)
- Episodes

Production
- Producers: Seiji Takeda (Mainichi Broadcasting); Fumikuni Fukusawa (Sunrise)
- Production companies: Mainichi Broadcasting System; Sunrise

Original release
- Networks: JNN (MBS, TBS)
- Release: October 5, 2002 – September 27, 2003

Related
Further information
Original video animation
After Phase: In the Valley of Stars
Directed by	Mitsuo Fukuda
Music by	Toshihiko Sahashi
Studio	Sunrise
Licensed by	NA: Sunrise
Released	March 26, 2004
Runtime	5 minutes
Manga
Written by	Masatsugu Iwase
Published by	Kodansha
English publisher	NA: Del Rey Manga
Magazine	Magazine Z
Original run	March 20, 2003 – January 21, 2005
Volumes	5
Novel series
Written by	Riu Goto
Published by	Kadokawa Shoten
English publisher	NA: Tokyopop
Imprint	Kadokawa Sneaker Bunko
Original run	2005 – 2006
Volumes	5
Manga
Mobile Suit Gundam SEED Re:
Written by	Juu Ishiguchi
Published by	Kadokawa Shoten
Magazine	Gundam Ace
Original run	March 26, 2012 – April 2014
Volumes	3 (+6 uncollected chapters)
Related anime
Mobile Suit Gundam SEED: Special Edition (compilation films); Mobile Suit Gundam SEED Destiny (sequel); Mobile Suit Gundam SEED Freedom (film)

Mobile Suit Gundam SEED (Japanese: 機動戦士ガンダムSEED(シード), Hepburn: Kidō Senshi Gandamu Shīdo) is a 2002 Japanese anime television series developed by Sunrise and directed by Mitsuo Fukuda. The ninth installment in the Gundam franchise, Gundam SEED takes place in a future calendar era, in this case the Cosmic Era. In this era, mankind has developed into two subspecies: Naturals, who reside on Earth, and Coordinators, genetically enhanced humans capable of amazing feats of intellect who emigrate to man-made orbital colonies to escape persecution by natural humans. The story revolves around a young Coordinator Kira Yamato who becomes involved in the war between the two races after a third, neutral faction's space colony is invaded by the Coordinators.

The television series was broadcast in Japan between 2002 and 2003, on the Tokyo Broadcasting System Television and MBS TV networks, beginning a broadcast partnership with the Gundam franchise. The series spawned three compilations films and was adapted into a manga as well as light novels. A sequel series, Mobile Suit Gundam SEED Destiny followed in 2004 and a followup film, Mobile Suit Gundam SEED Freedom was released in 2024. Merchandise has been released, including models, CD soundtracks and video games. Gundam SEED was licensed by Bandai Entertainment for broadcast in North America, and began airing in the United States and Canada in 2004. The films and the sequel were also licensed by Bandai. The manga and light novels as well as the spin-off series, Mobile Suit Gundam SEED Astray, were licensed. Video games were released in North America. In 2011, a HD remaster of the series consisting of 48 episodes was released.

Mobile Suit Gundam SEED was widely popular with the public in Japan, winning numerous awards, with high sales of the series DVD and music. It was also a critical success with writers focusing on the character development and animation, especially the leads. However, similarities with previous Gundam series were noted.

== Plot ==
The series is the first of the Gundam franchise set in the "Cosmic Era" in which mankind is divided between normal Earth dwelling humans, known as "Naturals", and the genetically altered super-humans known as "Coordinators". The primary conflict of the story plot derives from jealous hatred by Naturals of the abilities of Coordinators, leading to hate crimes, and eventually the emigration of almost all Coordinators who flee into space to live idyllic lives on giant orbital space colonies called PLANTS of their own design. War eventually breaks out between Earth and the PLANTS. The Earth is divided between two major factions, the Earth Forces formed from most of the natural born human nations, primarily the Eurasians and the Atlantic Federation, and a natural human supremacist group known as Blue Cosmos with its slogan, "For the preservation of our blue and pure world". The Earth Forces are not a unified alliance, and infighting and mistrust exist between their various nation states. The second major Earth nation is the Orb Union, a staunchly politically neutral and isolationist nation located on small Pacific Ocean islands ruled by a hereditary monarchy and still contains Coordinator citizens.

Two major events precede the story, known as the Bloody Valentine tragedy that initiated war between the PLANTS and the Earth Forces when one of the PLANT space stations, Junius-7, is destroyed by a nuclear bomb. The second event is the counterattack by the PLANTS that buries Neutron Jammers deep into Earth's crust that halts all nuclear reactions and long range radar and radio, causing most areas of earth to go without electricity or communication, and requiring mobile suits to rely on rechargeable batteries.

The PLANTS develop several new technologies that give them similar power to Earth despite their small population. The Mobile Suits give the PLANTS military the edge during the start of the war

The story begins in the neutral Orb Union owned space colony Heliopolis, where five advanced mobile suits for the Earth Forces war effort are developed in secret in exchange of sharing of their technical data with the neutral Orb Union military. Additionally, Heliopolis constructs a unique carrier battleship, the Archangel, to base the five mobile suits from for the Earth Forces. The colony is attacked by ZAFT forces, the military of the PLANTS, with the objective of stealing the new units. During the incursion an Orb Union student and Coordinator named Kira Yamato, upon seeing his friends in danger, pilots the GAT-X105 Strike mobile suit to fend off the invaders but the colony is critically damaged in the ensuing fight. As Heliopolis disintegrates, the survivors board the Archangel, and begin their journey to the Alliance base in Alaska. During the journey to Earth, Kira pilots the Strike to counter a series of attacks by ZAFT but is seemingly killed by his childhood friend, ZAFT soldier Athrun Zala, during one of their battles in which he also is nearly killed. Kira survives the attack and is taken by a blind priest to one of the PLANT space colonies, home to the Coordinators to recover. The Archangel arrives in Alaska but ZAFT launches a full-scale attack on the base overpowering their enemies. Unknown to ZAFT, the Earth forces knew of this attack ahead of time. They planned to sacrifice the Alaska base along with the Archangel in order to destroy ZAFT's army using a weapon of mass destruction hidden underneath the Alaska base.

Kira goes to Alaska with the ZGMF-X10A Freedom, a highly advanced, nuclear powered, and Neutron Jammer proof ZAFT mobile suit stolen by the PLANT pop star Coordinator Lacus Clyne, daughter of PLANT Supreme Council Chairman Siegel Clyne. Using the Freedom, Kira is able to help the Archangel flee the destruction of the Alaska base. The Archangel flees to the neutral country of the Orb Union. The Archangel and a new ship, the Orb Union ship Kusanagi leave Earth for space where they then join Lacus Clyne's rebel faction and their stolen ZAFT battleship, the Eternal (meant to carry the Freedom and Justice mobile suits) to form the Three Ships Alliance with the common goal of ending the war between the Naturals and Coordinators. In the midst of the conflict, Athrun learns that Kira survived and searches for him under orders to recover the Freedom Gundam, and is given an equally powerful prototype, the ZGMF-X09A Justice. However, after learning of Patrick Zala's, Athrun's father and the radical militant faction leader of the PLANT Supreme Council, plan to commit genocide, Athrun deserts him and joins the Three Ships Alliance. In a final battle, the Earth Forces deploys nuclear weapons equipped with Neutron Jammer Canceler technology copied from stolen data on the Freedom and Justice Gundam's power systems. The Earth Forces intend to destroy the PLANT space colonies but are stopped by ZAFT's GENESIS, a nuclear pumped gamma ray laser designed to commit genocide on the Naturals. The Three Ship Alliance intervenes to defeat the GENESIS weapon ending the battle. The war ultimately ends as a peace treaty is signed.

== Development ==
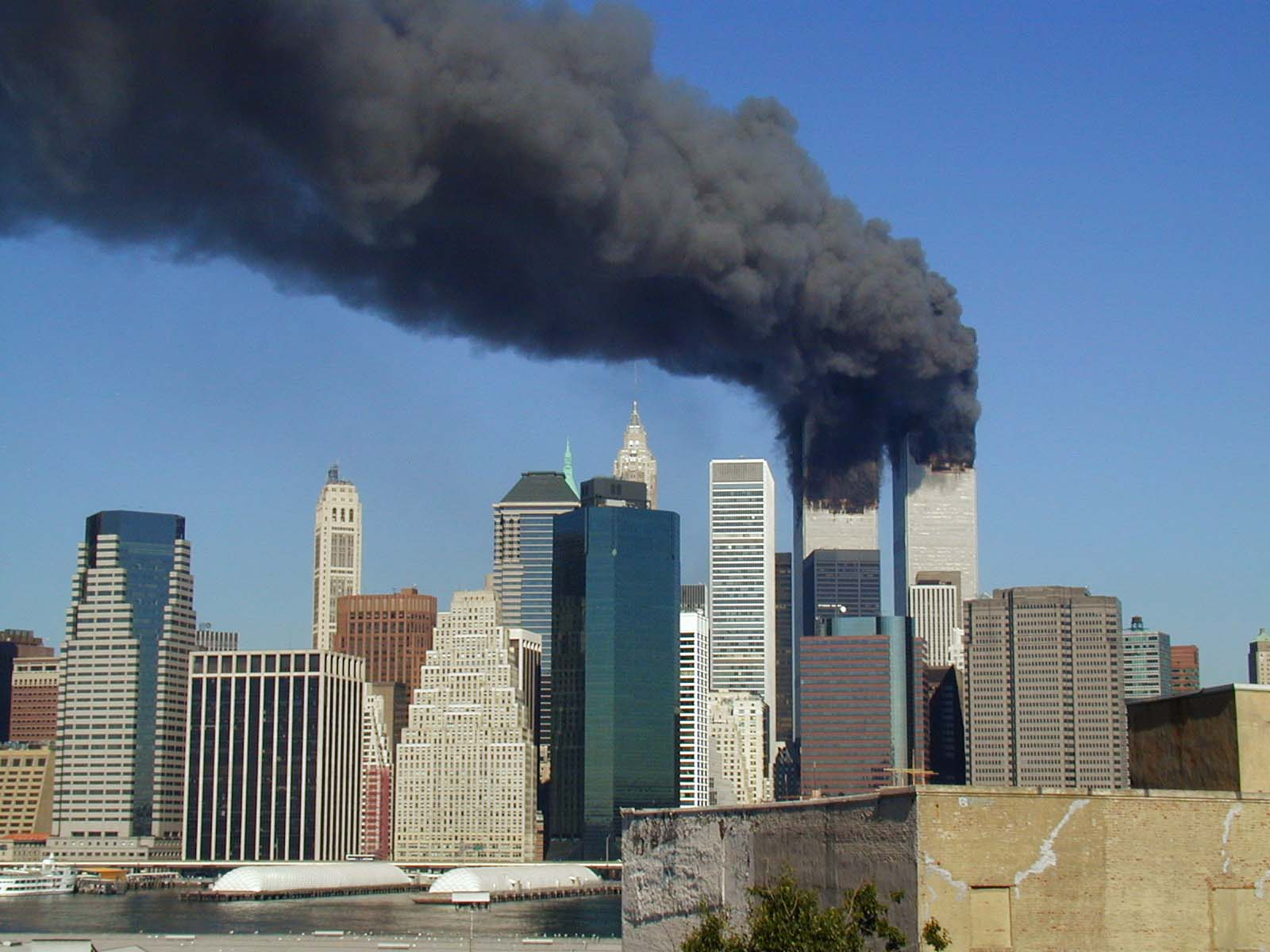
The theme of war was influenced by the terrorist attacks from 2001 and how the characters fight to avoid more chaos.

Mobile Suit Gundam SEED was directed by Mitsuo Fukuda (Future GPX Cyber Formula and Gear Fighter Dendoh) with music by Toshihiko Sahashi. A long time Gundam fan, Fukuda met the president of Sunrise in order let him work in his anime series based on the franchise, stating he had no previous experience with it. Shortly afterwards, the staff members from Sunrise believed Fukuda was worthy of directing the new Gundam anime. Fukuda conceived SEED as one of the biggest projects in his career, noting that it was difficult for him as a result as he worked under pressure. However, when the series started, Fukuda was relieved that it had strong ratings and merchandising . In the making of the series, Fukuda first wrote an idea for the premise and the use of mechas fighting. In order to write human drama, Fukuda conceived the idea of the struggle between two kind of races, the Naturals and the Coordinators who would be explored in the television series which was inspired by Yoshiyuki Tomino's Newtype concept from the first Gundam series. While the narrative of SEED often makes parallels with Tomino's Gundam, Fukuda wanted SEED to feature a more "modern war" setting. The producer of the series suggested using the 1998 film Saving Private Ryan as a reference to explore the concept of war. Some areas from the storyboards were scrapped because the staff found the original plot to be too violent.

When the series started development, Fukuda noticed the world was in chaos as a result of the September 11 attacks. This influenced the themes of Gundam SEED featuring anti-war movement themes through the pacifist Kira Yamato; Fukuda based hime concept of an Islamic soldier fighting in the US military. The setting in which the mechanics that appear are powered by electricity was influenced by Gear Fighter Dendoh which Fukuda previously directed, and when it came to handling the Gundam, he focused on its aspect as a symbol of the character piloting it.

The series was first announced in June 2002, while a trailer was available in September on the series' official website. A total of eight writers were in charge of the series. The characters were designed by Hisashi Hirai, while the mechanical designs were made by Kunio Okawara and Kimitoshi Yamane. Mobile Suit Gundam planning manager Koichi Inoue stated that the staff making Gundam SEED was a new and young team that would continue working with following Gundam series. Inoue, however, would work with anime based on the original Gundam series.

Fukuda stated that Gundam SEED was initially told from Kira's point of view, but deeper into the series the point of view would shift to other characters. His main focus with the series was to entertain the audience, pointing out that the drama would develop through the series in a similar vein to previous Gundam series. The first part worked on was the plot followed by action sequences, stating that the human characters were more important than the combat sequences. In retrospect, Fukuda said that Kira's wish to fight was forced upon him stemming from his desire to protect his friends. Moreover, he considered these actions as being based on Japanese thoughts.

Fukuda reclaims having enjoyed the scene from episode 46 based on the emotional support Lacus Clyne provides to Kira. Akira Ishida agreed with Fukuda, stating the scene was well directed. For the final episode of the series, Fukuda aimed to bring Kira to his lowest where he becomes unstable when Flay is killed by Rau, leaving a major impact in him, considering himself a failure for failing to protect her. When it came to this scene in both retelling films and HD remaster of the series, Fukuda wanted the original audio to remain the same as he feared adding a song or changing the background music would have ruined it. Following Rau's death at Kira's hand in the final episode of the series, Fukuda wanted the last scene involving Kira being outside Freedom in space while being rescued by Athrun and Cagalli to change for the remaster for adding a more symbolic tone. Sōichirō Hoshi expressed joy in voicing the character and was happy when redoing his character's lines for the remaster of the series. One of Hoshi's favorite lines in the franchise is "I still have a world I want to protect!" in the final episode of SEED when facing Rau as he felt it was heartwarming. Another aspect Hoshi enjoyed in regards to his work was how Kira and Athrun become allies in the 39th episode following multiple fights across the anime.

== Media ==
=== Anime ===
The series premiered in Japan on the terrestrial Tokyo Broadcasting System and Mainichi Broadcasting System networks, where it occupied the Saturday 6 pm timeslot, replacing Ultraman Cosmos. Mobile Suit Gundam SEED aired between October 5, 2002, and September 27, 2003. Each episode was streamed on the Internet the day after broadcast, for users subscribing to NTT services, in Windows Media or Real format. The series was sold in Japan as thirteen DVD volumes released from March 28, 2003 to March 26, 2004 by Bandai Visual. On March 26, 2004, a five-minute epilogue called After Phase: In the Valley of Stars was released on the thirteenth and final DVD of the Japanese release. A DVD box set of the series was released on February 23, 2010. A fifty-episode sequel titled Mobile Suit Gundam SEED Destiny aired in Japan from October 9, 2004 to October 1, 2005, airing on the same stations as Gundam SEED. Gundam SEED Destiny takes place two years after the original series and follows Shinn Asuka, focusing mainly on his involvement in the new war.

An HD remaster edition of the series was confirmed in August 2011 although Mitsuo Fukuda stated it was leaked information and that the official information would come in the next few days. In November 2011, Bandai announced the release of the series in four Blu-ray compilations between March and December 2012. The HD version was first streamed on the Bandai Channel website in December 2011 and aired in Japan between January and November 2012.

Bandai Entertainment licensed the animation of Gundam SEED on February 15, 2004, and it began airing in the United States and Canada that same year. The English adaptation was produced in association with The Ocean Group and the English-language dub was recorded at Ocean Studios in Vancouver, British Columbia, Canada. The series was released on ten DVDs in bilingual format between August 10, 2004, and May 10, 2005. The epilogue was not released on the North American DVD release because it was not licensed to Bandai Entertainment by Sunrise; however, it was released on the final European DVD release. Beez Entertainment also published the series in ten DVDs from June 13, 2005 to March 6, 2006. A two part box set called the "Anime Legends Edition" was released on January 8, 2008, and March 4, 2008, with each set containing five DVDs.

On October 11, 2014, at their 2014 New York Comic Con panel, Sunrise announced they will be re-releasing all of the Gundam franchise, including Gundam SEED and Gundam SEED Destiny in North America though distribution from Right Stuf Inc., beginning in Spring 2015. On August 11, 2017, at their 2017 Otakon panel, Sunrise announced that they will be releasing the HD remaster of SEED in North America with a brand new English dub produced by NYAV Post. It was released on December 1, 2020.

=== Films ===
A three-part film compilation of the television series has been released as Mobile Suit Gundam SEED: Special Edition. Each compilation film is 90 minutes long and retells the story of Gundam SEED, with additional and altered scenes from the TV series. Mobile Suit Gundam SEED Destiny followed the same formula in four compilation films as Mobile Suit Gundam SEED Destiny: Special Edition. They were released from August 27 to October 22 during 2004 in DVD format. The three films were re-released alongside the four films from Gundam SEED Destiny on February 25, 2010. Gundam SEED: Special Edition has been licensed for North America by Bandai Entertainment and was released on DVDs in English, between July 11, 2005, and November 22, 2005. A DVD box of the three films was released by Bandai on November 26, 2008 under the title of "Mobile Suit Gundam SEED Complete Feature Collection".

In addition, a new film entitled Mobile Suit Gundam SEED Freedom was released in January 2024.

=== Soundtracks ===
The music from the series is composed by Toshihiko Sahashi with CDs published by Victor Entertainment. Notable artists who sang opening and ending themes for the series include Nami Tamaki, who was fourteen years old when the third opening theme was used, and T.M. Revolution, who also provided the voice for the character, Miguel Aiman, under the artist's real name, Takanori Nishikawa. Four original soundtracks were released between December 4, 2002 and December 16, 2004. They include background music, insert themes as well as some opening and ending themes. Symphony SEED -Symphonic Suit Mobile Suit Gundam SEED- is a collaboration album between Mobile Suit Gundam SEED music and the London Symphony Orchestra released on May 8, 2004 containing a total of ten tracks. A compilation DVD, featuring four music videos from Mobile Suit Gundam SEED and Mobile Suit Gundam SEED Destiny, was released on May 24, 2006 under the title Mobile Suit Gundam SEED & SEED DESTINY Clipping 4 Songs. Five character CDs with themes performed by the Japanese voice actors were released between March 21, 2003 and July 23, 2003. Two compilation albums have also been released: Mobile Suit Gundam SEED COMPLETE BEST was released on November 22, 2006, featuring thirteen tracks. Mobile Suit Gundam SEED ~ SEED DESTINY BEST "THE BRIDGE" Across the Songs from GUNDAM SEED & SEED DESTINY is a two-CD compilation of ending themes, insert and character songs from Gundam SEED and Gundam SEED Destiny. All the songs from Gundam SEED and Gundam SEED Destiny by T.M.Revolution were collected in a CD titled X42S-REVOLUTION, released on March 24, 2010. The limited-edition version includes a DVD with music videos from the anime series. Two other CD singles were released during 2012 featuring the new theme songs from the HD rerelease of Gundam SEED.

=== Manga ===
A manga series was written by Masatsugu Iwase based on the events from the anime series. It was published in five tankōbon volumes from March 20, 2003 to January 21, 2005 by Kodansha. The English version was published in North America by Del Rey Manga who licensed it in January 2004 as one of their first titles, and released between April 27, 2004 and August 30, 2005. Another spin-off series is Mobile Suit Gundam SEED Astray, written by Tomohiro Chiba and illustrated by Kōichi Tokita, which focused on the three MBF-P0x mobile suit prototypes and their respective pilots and organizations. It was published in three tankōbon volumes from April 28, 2003 to February 26, 2004 by Kadokawa Shoten. The English release was announced by Tokyopop in December 2003. The volumes were released between May 11, 2004 and November 9, 2004. A one-volume manga titled Mobile Suit Gundam SEED featuring SUIT CD (機動戦士ガンダムSEED featuring SUIT CD) was written by Yasushi Yamaguchi and released on January 22, 2005 by Kadokawa. In 2012, Kadokawa released a new manga series titled Mobile Suit Gundam SEED: Re by Juu Ishiguchi. The manga retells the events from the television series. It was cancelled in 2015. It was partially collected into three tankobon volumes.

Two more side stories titled Mobile Suit Gundam SEED Astray R and Mobile Suit Gundam SEED X Astray were created. Toda Yasunari replaced Tokita as the illustrator in the former, while Tokita reprised his role in the latter. Mobile Suit Gundam SEED Astray R follows the adventures of the Red Frame's pilot Lowe and his Junk Guild associates and interlocks with the events of the original Astray-series. It spanned four volumes published from March 20, 2003 to August 26, 2004. The English volumes published by TokyoPop were released from February 8, 2005 to November 8, 2005. Gundam SEED X Astray is about Canard Pars, who is a failed experiment from the Ultimate Coordinator program. Canard is searching for Kira Yamato, the successful Ultimate Coordinator, so that he can defeat him and prove he was not a "failure". Two volumes were published for the series in May and October, 2005. TokyoPop published its two volumes on October 31, 2006 and February 27, 2007. There was a "photo novel" side story titled Mobile Suit Gundam SEED Astray B which was illustrated by Toda Yasunari. A single volume from the series was published on August 31, 2005 and follows Gai Murakumo and his fellow Serpent Tail mercenaries.

There is yonkoma series titled Mobile Suit Gundam SEED Club Yonkoma that parodies the events from both Gundam SEED and Gundam SEED Destiny. The comics were a joint venture between Sunrise's official Gundam SEED fan club and Newtype Japanese magazine. Kadokawa Shoten released the first publications of the yonkoma on August 8, 2005.

=== Light novels ===
A light novel adaptation of the TV series was authored by Riu Goto. It was originally a supplement of Kadokawa Sneaker Bunko with illustrations by Ogasawara Tomofumi. The stories were eventually published in five volumes by Kadokawa Shoten with the first one in March 2003 and the fifth in January 2004. Tokyopop released the first three light novels in North America from October 11, 2005 to May 9, 2006. Two light novels volumes from Mobile Suit Gundam SEED Astray spin-off series were also authored by Tomohiro Chiba and published by Kadokawa on September 1, 2003 and July 1, 2004.

=== Video games ===
Video games have been released based on the anime series: Gundam Seed: Federation vs. Z.A.F.T. II for arcades, Mobile Suit Gundam Seed: Tomo to Kimi to Senjou de (機動戦士ガンダムSEED: 友と君と戦場で; lit. "Friends and Foes on the Battlefield") and Gundam Seed: Battle Assault for the Game Boy Advance, Gundam Seed: Federation vs. Z.A.F.T., Mobile Suit Gundam Seed, Mobile Suit Gundam Seed: Never Ending Tomorrow, Mobile Suit Gundam Seed Destiny: Generation of CE, and Gundam Seed: Federation vs. Z.A.F.T. 2 Plus for PlayStation 2, A PlayStation Portable game was also released under the title of Gundam Seed: Federation vs. Z.A.F.T. Portable as well as a mobile phone game, Mobile Suit Gundam SEED Phase-Act Delivery. Artdink developed the first PlayStation Vita Gundam game, Mobile Suit Gundam SEED Battle Destiny (機動戦士ガンダムSEED BATTLE DESTINY). Released on June 7, 2012, the game covers events from both Gundam SEED and Gundam SEED Destiny. A remaster for Windows and Nintendo Switch is set for a release on May 22, 2025.

Characters from Gundam SEED have been featured in Gundam crossover games. These include Mobile Suit Gundam: Gundam vs. Gundam Next, the SD Gundam G series and a few games from the Gundam Battle Assault series, Dynasty Warriors: Gundam 2, and Dynasty Warriors: Gundam 3. Other crossover games featuring them are games from the Super Robot Wars series as well as Another Century's Episode 3 and Another Century's Episode: R.

=== Other merchandise ===
Guidebooks have been released for Gundam SEED such as Mobile Suit Gundam SEED Ultimate Super Encyclopedia (決定版 機動戦士ガンダムSEED超百科) on July 10, 2003. Two official guidebooks were released in Japan on July 18, 2003 by Kadokawa Shoten: Mobile Suit Gundam SEED Photos Freedom Kira (機動戦士ガンダムSEED写真集 FREEDOMキラ) and Mobile Suit Gundam SEED Photos Justice Athrun (機動戦士ガンダムSEED写真集 JUSTICEアスラン) focus on Kira Yamato and Athrun Zala respectively. In the same year, a series of guidebooks with the label of "Official File" were released in Japan. A guidebook titled Mobile Suit Gundam SEED – All Characters Analysis (僕たちの好きなガンダムSEED 全キャラクター徹底解析編) was published on April 19, 2004, featuring an extensive analysis on the storyline and characters. A more detailed guidebook, Mobile Suit Gundam SEED Perfect Archive Series (僕たちの好きなガンダムSEED PERFECT ARCHIVE SERIES), featuring articles on the characters, technology and universe was published in March 2006. An artbook titled Mobile Suit Gundam SEED RGB Illustrations (機動戦士ガンダムSEED RGB ILLUSTRATIONS) was released on July 26, 2004.

== Reception ==
=== Popularity ===
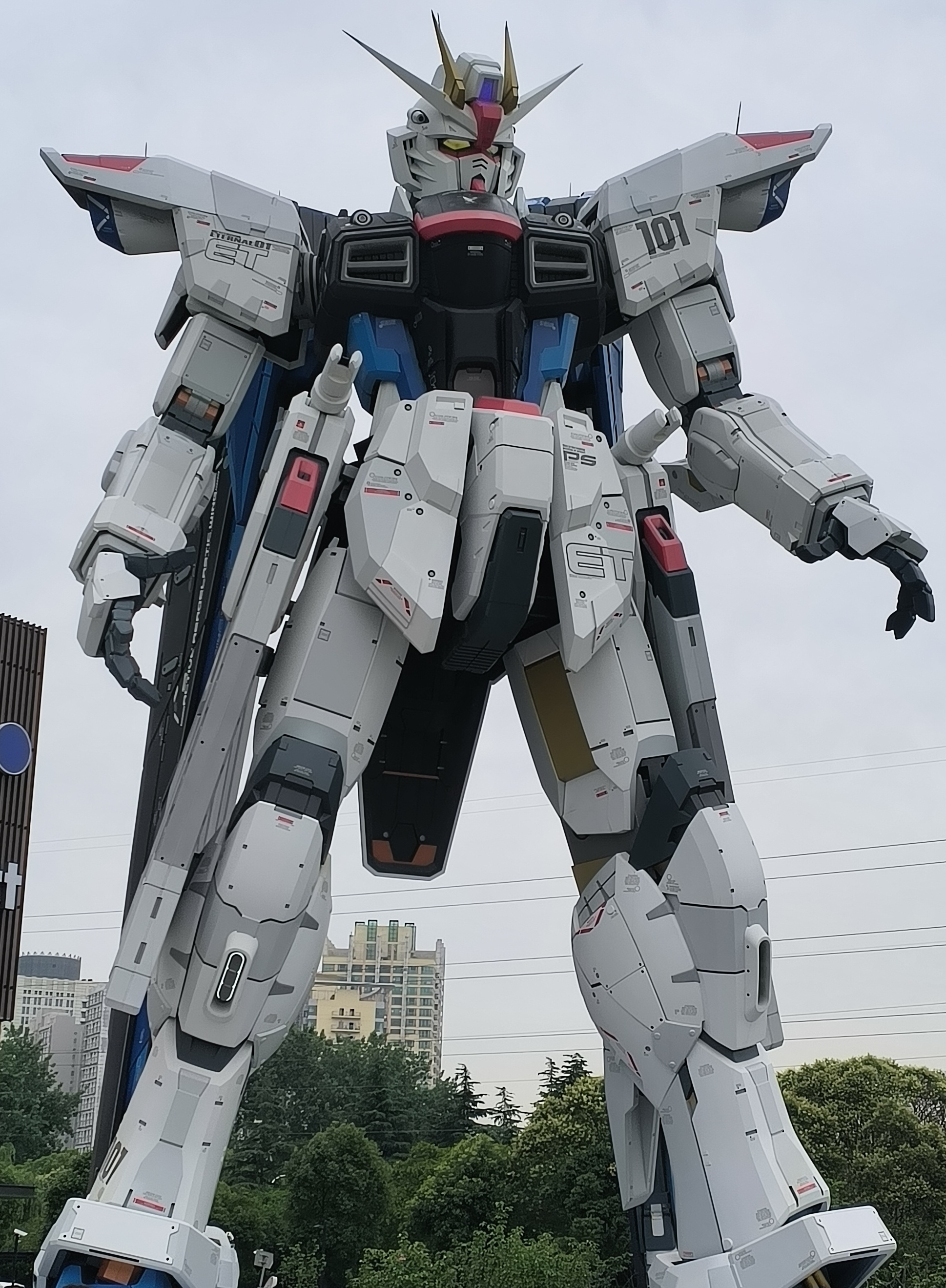
A replica of Kira's Freedom mobile suit.

The show has become one of the most popular of the Gundam series in Japan, enjoying high television ratings and DVD sales. In April 2004, Bandai Visual announced that one million copies of the Gundam SEED DVD had been sold in Japan, with the first volume having sold over 100,000 copies. In total, the series set a record of making eight DVDs appearing in the first eight top sales. The same record was repeated in 2016 by Mr. Osomatsu. CDs sales have also been high with the single CD from the series' first ending theme becoming one of the top-selling CDs in Japan during 2002. By July 2004, 10 million plastic Gundam SEED models had been sold worldwide.

Jerry Chu, marketing manager for Bandai Entertainment Inc., stated the response to Gundam SEED has been highly positive, having broken rating records when it first aired in Japan. Chu added that reaction in the United States was the most enthusiastic Bandai received in the last six years. According to the analyst John Oppliger of AnimeNation Gundam SEED became the first Gundam series which was widely successful not only among "Gundam fans and hardcore otaku" but also among "mainstream, casual Japanese viewers". Gundam SEED was the eighth TV Feature Award winner at the Animation Kobe Awards in 2003. It was the third winner at the Japanese Otaku Awards in 2003. It won Animage's twenty-fifth Anime Grand Prix award winner in 2002, with the characters of Kira Yamato and Lacus Clyne topping the male and female anime categories, respectively. It topped the charts in the Newtype magazine reader poll during 2004. However, the show was not well received by older Japanese fans. In February 2004, Sunrise's president, Takayuki Yoshii, stated it was because Gundam SEED incorporated elements from popular live-action television dramas. On the other hand, Bandai Visual reported in April 2004 that Gundam SEED had a wide audience, including both young and older viewers. In the NHK's 2018 mega "All Gundam Poll", Mobile Suit Gundam SEED was place as the third best anime in the Gundam franchise, only behind the original 1979 Mobile Suit Gundam and Mobile Suit Zeta Gundam.

In July 2021, a replica of the Freedom was unveiled in Shanghai together with a concert by T.M.Revolution. Kira and Lacus' images were shown during this concert.

=== Critical response ===
Gundam SEED has been praised for being a stand-out in a long line of Gundam series with Anime News Network's Paul Fargo calling it "the best of the alternative timelines, but stands as one of the best Gundam titles". The story has been praised for its battle sequences as well as its character-driven scenes, neither of which were reviewed to have detracted emphasis from the other. The series was noted to "downshift" in pace from its early episodes as the main characters development began to progress along political themes, which appealed to some audiences. Early in the series, speculations were made with regard to the progress the characters' relationships. The relationship between Kira Yamato and Athrun Zala earned praise as it resulted in entertaining action scenes between their mobile suits, while in later reviews speculation arose as to whether the two would become allies.

The climax has been praised for bringing unexpected inclusions within the war, as well as revelations regarding the characters' roles. A common comment among writers was that Gundam SEED blended elements from previous Gundam series and displayed it in a fast-paced way, making it enjoyable to younger fans but still engaging older fans familiar with previous series. DVD Verdict writer Mitchell Hattaway further noted that while it used elements from other anime series, it still "drew [him] in so quickly [he] soon found [himself] wrapped up in the proceedings". Carl Kimlinger from Anime News Network stated that Gundam SEED adapted the original Mobile Suit Gundam series from 1979 for a modern audience in the same way Mobile Suit Gundam 00 would adapt Mobile Suit Gundam Wing. Bamboo Dong from the same site stated that while this caused the appearance of "hardcore anti-Gundam Seed zealots" who criticized the series for these traits, it was nevertheless entertaining to watch and give anime fans a step into the "Gundam fandom".

The quality of the animation led THEM Anime Reviews' Derrick L. Tucker to call it "by-and-far the best of any Gundam Series to date". Additionally, the soundtrack was popular for bringing popular J-pop artists such as Nami Tamaki and T.M. Revolution to perform the theme songs. The casting of many talented voice actors, such as Rie Tanaka, Seki Tomokazu and Houko Kuwashima, provided the emotional depth in scenes that required it. The English dub was reviewed favorably for the most part but comparisons between the English and original Japanese dubbing revealed weaknesses in the portrayal of the characters.

=== Controversy ===
The sixteenth episode of Gundam SEED features a scene in which Kira Yamato is seen dressing after getting out of a bed where the teenage girl Flay Allster lies sleeping naked, suggesting a sexual relationship. The Japanese Commission for Better Broadcasting reported that viewers filed complaints regarding the scene as the show was aired at 6 pm when children would be watching. Mainichi replied by mentioning it should have given more careful consideration to the episode before airing it. The scene was extended in one of the compilation films with John Oppliger noting it expanded the off-screen scene with three shots.

== Notes ==
Preceded by G-Saviour	Gundam metaseries (production order); 2002–2003	Succeeded by Superior Defender Gundam Force
Preceded by none	Gundam Cosmic Era timeline C.E. 71	Succeeded by Mobile Suit Gundam SEED Destiny
