= Seiji Takeda =

Japanese television producer

Seiji Takeda (竹田 菁滋, Takeda Seiji; born 1960 in Nara Prefecture) is the deputy director of Mainichi Broadcasting System's Tokyo office. Since beginning the network's 6:00 pm Saturday timeblock, he has been involved in the planning and production of numerous anime, including various series from the Gundam universe, Code Geass, Blood+, Fullmetal Alchemist, Eureka Seven, Terra e... and Darker than Black: Kuro no Keiyakusha.

== Biography ==
After graduating from the University of Tokyo's school of literature, Takeda joined Mainichi Broadcasting System in 1984, first working at the network's news bureau and later transferring to the network's Tokyo television department. Among the affairs he had covered during his time in the network's news department was the infamous Glico Morinaga case.

After transferring to MBS' television department, Takeda became involved in the production and planning of numerous anime television series, chiefly starting off the network's Saturday 6:00 pm timeblock and being involved in its major popularity and success. Beginning with the timeblock's first major series, Mobile Suit Gundam SEED and followed by its successors such as Fullmetal Alchemist, Blood+ and Mobile Suit Gundam 00, the slot has enjoyed high ratings since its inception, with Takeda being involved in the planning and production of each of its shows and having been largely credited for its success. He guest appeared as King T@KED@ in Mobile Suit Gundam SEED DESTINY.

Takeda has also been involved in collaborations with the satellite anime television network Animax, with Animax having aired numerous of Mainichi Broadcasting System's anime, as well as jump starting several promotional campaigns in magazines and other media which have helped further promote each of the anime programs aired by the network.

== Produced anime television series ==
=== Current programs ===
- Star Driver: Kagayaki no Takuto (Planning)
- Puella Magi Madoka Magica (Planning)

=== Previous programs ===
- Mobile Suit Gundam SEED (Producer)
- Fullmetal Alchemist (Planning)
- Mobile Suit Gundam SEED DESTINY (Executive Producer)
- Blood+ (Planning)
- Eureka Seven (Planning)
- Tenpō Ibun Ayakashi Ayashi (Planning)
- Code Geass: Lelouch of the Rebellion (first season) (Planning)
- Terra e... (Planning)
- Darker than Black: Kuro no Keiyakusha (Planning)
- Mobile Suit Gundam 00 (Executive Producer)
- Shakugan no Shana II (Planning)
- Macross Frontier (Executive Producer)
- Mobile Suit Gundam 00 (season 2) (Executive Producer)
- Black Butler (Planning)
- Fullmetal Alchemist: Brotherhood (Planning)
- Basquash! (Executive Producer)
- Sengoku Basara Two (Planning)
