= Mobile Suit Gundam 00 the Movie: A Wakening of the Trailblazer =

- 劇場版 機動戦士ガンダム00 -A wakening of the Trailblazer-
- Directed by: Seiji Mizushima
- Screenplay by: Yōsuke Kuroda
- Based on: Mobile Suit Gundam 00 by Hajime Yatate and Yoshiyuki Tomino
- Starring: Mamoru Miyano; Shinichiro Miki; Hiroyuki Yoshino; Hiroshi Kamiya
- Edited by: Yukiko Nojiri
- Music by: Kenji Kawai
- Production company: Sunrise
- Distributed by: Shochiku
- Release date: September 18, 2010
- Running time: 120 minutes
- Country: Japan
- Language: Japanese
- Box office: $10,916,573

Mobile Suit Gundam 00 the Movie: A Wakening of the Trailblazer (劇場版 機動戦士ガンダム00 -A wakening of the Trailblazer-, Gekijōban Kidō Senshi Gandamu Daburu Ō A weikeningu ofu za Toreirubureizā) is a 2010 Japanese anime science fiction film part of the Gundam metaseries and directed by Seiji Mizushima. The film is set two years after the second season of Mobile Suit Gundam 00 and concludes the series' storyline, with Celestial Being and the rest of Earth Forces fighting a group of hostile aliens known as ELS. The film is notable for being the first entry in Gundam to feature aliens as its antagonists. The film premiered on September 18, 2010, and was released on Blu-ray and DVD in Japan on December 25, 2010.

== Plot ==
Two years after the defeat of the Innovators, an unknown alien fragment lands on a research station and reactivates it, causing it to head towards Earth. In Celestial Being's Asteroid Base, Ian Vashti greets his wife, Linda, after her two-year assignment and unloads two new GN Drives and a new incomplete Gundam, the GNT-0000 00 Qan[T]. Marina Ismail and Shirin Bakhtiar inspect a colony construction facility, but are attacked by assassins. Setsuna F. Seiei arrives and destroys them.

The Earth Sphere Federation sends GN-XIV's, led by Andrei Smirnov, to destroy the station. Kati Mannequin arrives on board the Celestial Being station with Patrick Colasour and encounters Veda along with the surviving Innovators. The newest emerging Innovator, Descartes Shaman, destroys the probe ship, with debris falling to Earth. Soon after, Earth experiences strange events, with electronic vehicles and devices operating on their own. Billy Katagiri and Mehna Carmine hypothesize that the events are related to the Extraterrestrial Living-metal Shape-shifters (ELS), a metallic alien species.

The Federation forces travel to Mars to discover the ELS's intentions, with Descartes heading out first. Descartes and most of the ships and Mobile suits are assimilated, killing Descartes in the process. With the ELS surrounding him, Tieria Erde self-destructs his Gundam to take out the ELS. The Sol Brave Squadron, led by Graham Aker, arrive and help Celestial Being escape. Setsuna falls victim to a mental attack from the ELS and is rendered comatose in the middle of battle. After the battle, the Ptolemaios crew and the Earth Sphere Federation discover a moon-sized ELS and determine that it will arrive at Earth in 92 days.

Many of the Federation's Baikal-class ships are assimilated by the ELS, who subsequently created their own copies of the technology. Zabanya and Harute arrive to assist the ESF and member forces in battle. Despite the backup, the ELS still overwhelms the allied forces and assimilates many ships and Mobile Suits. Andrei notices one of the ELS ships heading for Earth and sacrifices himself to destroy the ship. On board the Ptolemaios 2, Setsuna lies in a dream-like state, but awakens after seeing the flower that Feldt Grace gave him.

Patrick's GN-XIV is hit by an ELS and is slowly assimilated. He prepares to self-destruct, but Setsuna blasts Patrick's GNX, saving him from assimilation. With a large number of ELS appearing, the Harute is assimilated and Allelujah Haptism and Marie Parfacy are forced to eject. Setsuna attempts to communicate with the ELS via the Twin Drive's quantum effect, but it is to no avail as the ELS thwart Setsuna's attempts. Graham, now partially assimilated, sacrifices himself to let Setsuna enter the core of the ELS ship. After Setsuna establishes contact, he realizes the attack was a misunderstanding, as assimilation was the ELS's only means to understand humanity. It also revealed that the ELS's original homeworld was consumed by a red giant star and they began searching the universe for a new home. Through Setsuna's quantum brainwaves, the true intention of the ELS's arrival to Earth is understood and the battle is ended. The ELS uses Setsuna's vision of a flower to alter the superstructure of their mother ship.

Fifty years later, the flower is now a deep space station for intergalactic travel, with the ELS co-existing with humanity. Marina, now living in the countryside, is visited by Setsuna, who has become an ELS/Innovator hybrid.

== Box office ==
The film was released in Japan on September 18, and was ranked at #3 in its first weekend with US$2,260,690 on just 88 screens. After two months, the film earned ¥866 million ($11 million) in Japan, and $136,573 overseas, grossing a worldwide total of $11.14 million.

== Critical reception ==
The film has received mixed reviews, with Michael Toole from Anime News Network ranking the film an Overall C grade, stating that it had "mouth-watering mecha battles, and a few really nicely tender moments for fans of the show's characters" but that it was "a confused mess of a film with too little plot and too many characters; only made watchable by its numerous action scenes and famous namesake." Marcello from JapanCinema also gave the film an Overall C, stating that "the hype and everything else that comes with it, is a failure." Chris Guanche, editor-in-chief of Mecha & Anime HQ, gave the film a positive review with 4.5 stars, concluding "This movie is definitely not intended for newcomers, and at times it can be a little unsubtle and preachy about its theme of understanding, but it serves as the perfect conclusion to the story of the 00 universe.", also has an aesthetic mood and ending to the audience.

Preceded by SD Gundam Sangokuden Brave Battle Warriors	Gundam metaseries (production order); 2010	Succeeded by Model Suit Gunpla Builders Beginning G
Preceded by Mobile Suit Gundam 00	Anno Domini; 2314 AD	Succeeded by none
