= Mobile Suit Gundam 00 =

Japanese anime television series

- Japanese television flyer
- Genre: Mecha; Military science fiction action
- Created by: Hajime Yatate; Yoshiyuki Tomino
- Screenplay by: Yōsuke Kuroda
- Directed by: Seiji Mizushima
- Music by: Kenji Kawai
- Country of origin: Japan
- Original language: Japanese
- No. of seasons: 2
- No. of episodes: 50 (list of episodes)

Production
- Executive producers: Seiji Takeda (Mainichi Broadcasting); Yasuo Miyagawa (Sunrise)
- Producers: Hirô Maruyama (Mainichi Broadcasting); Hiromi Iketani (Sunrise)
- Production companies: Mainichi Broadcasting System; Sunrise

Original release
- Network: JNN (MBS, TBS)
- Release: October 6, 2007 – March 29, 2009

Related
- Video game

Mobile Suit Gundam 00: Gundam Meisters
- Developer: Yuke's
- Publisher: Namco Bandai Games
- Platform: PlayStation 2
- Released: October 16, 2008
- Original video animation

Mobile Suit Gundam 00: Special Edition
- Directed by: Seiji Mizushima
- Written by: Yōsuke Kuroda
- Studio: Sunrise
- Licensed by: NA: Sunrise
- Released: October 27, 2009 – February 23, 2010
- Episodes: 3
- Related
- Mobile Suit Gundam 00 (video game); A Wakening of the Trailblazer (film)

Mobile Suit Gundam 00 (Japanese: 機動戦士ガンダム00（ダブルオー）, Hepburn: Kidō Senshi Gandamu Daburu Ō; Mobile Suit Gundam Double-O) is a Japanese anime television series and the eleventh installment of Sunrise's Gundam franchise. The series is set on a futuristic Earth and is centered on the exploits of the paramilitary organization Celestial Being and its efforts to rid the world of war and conflict with a series of unique and extremely advanced mecha mobile suits known as "Gundams". Unlike the previous installments, the timeline that the series takes place in corresponds to the real life Gregorian calendar, in this case Anno Domini (AD).

Comprising two seasons, the series was directed by Seiji Mizushima and written by Yōsuke Kuroda, and features character designs by Yun Kōga. The 25-episode first season was officially announced by Sunrise with a 15-second trailer on June 2, 2007. It aired on the Mainichi Broadcasting System, Tokyo Broadcasting System and its affiliated JNN stations from October 5, 2007, to March 29, 2008. The second season began on October 5, 2008, and concluded on March 29, 2009. A film sequel, titled Mobile Suit Gundam 00 the Movie: A Wakening of the Trailblazer, premiered in Japan on September 18, 2010, and was released on DVD and Blu-ray on December 25, 2010, in Japan. Mobile Suit Gundam 00 is the first Gundam television series to be animated in widescreen and in high-definition.

== Plot ==
=== Season 1 ===
The series is set in 2307 AD. As a result of the depletion of fossil fuels, humanity had to search for a new source of power. The power was found in the form of multiple Dyson rings (massive arrays of solar power collectors) orbiting Earth, and supported by three orbital elevators, each one serving one of the three "power blocs" on the planet, namely the Union (Union of Solar Energy and Free Nations), controlling the Americas, Australia, New Zealand, and Japan; the Human Reform League (Sino-Japanese: 人類革新連盟; Romaji: jinrui kakushin renmei; Pinyin: rénlèi géxīn liánméng), controlling nearly all of mainland Asia besides the Middle East along with most of Oceania; and the AEU (Advanced European Union), which controls mainland Europe as well as many islands in the North Atlantic and Arctic Oceans. With this nearly inexhaustible source of energy benefiting only the major powers and their allies, constant warfare erupts around the globe among minor countries for fuels and energy. Countries that once economically relied on the sale of fossil fuels have plunged into poverty. Some even believe that solar energy threatened the "promised land of God", resulting in the 20-year Solar Wars. This chaos led to the formation of a private military organization, called Celestial Being (ソレスタルビーイング, Soresutaru Bīingu), dedicated to eradicating war and uniting humanity through the use of four advanced machines called Gundams. Mobile Suit Gundam 00 follows four mobile suit pilots termed Gundam Meisters (ガンダムマイスター, Gandamu Maisutā), sided with Celestial Being. The main protagonist is 16-year-old Setsuna F. Seiei, a taciturn Gundam pilot who grew up in the war-torn Middle Eastern Republic of Krugis (which seems to be based on the territory of Kurdistan).

Unable to counter Celestial Being's superior technology, the three major powers eventually unite into the United Nations Army in order to counter Celestial Being's armed interventions. In order to fight the Gundams, the United Nations Army employed the help of Laguna Harvey. Harvey, a Celestial Being intelligence agent turned traitor, provides them with 30 GN-X, mobile suits equipped with pseudo-GN Drives. As the United Nations resist Celestial Being's interventions, a second team of Gundams, known as Team Trinity, appears and assists in the Meisters' eradication of war, albeit in a much more cruel and cold-blooded fashion.

Alejandro Corner, a former Celestial Being observer who plans to make use of the chaos and destruction created by Celestial Being to rule a reconstructed world, subsequently takes over Veda, Celestial Being's supercomputer which is believed to be located in the moon somewhere. Without the tactical aid from the organization's artificial intelligence, Celestial Being is easily overwhelmed and overpowered by the GN-X units and their superior numbers.

The United Nations Army initiates Operation Fallen Angels to destroy the Gundams, having discovered the location of the Meisters' mothership, Ptolemaios. During the operation, Ali Al-Saachez kills Lockon Stratos after a climactic battle (Lockon Stratos was just injured in a previous battle). Alejandro Corner, in his unique custom mobile armor Alvatore, attacks Setsuna as the GN-X units proceed to destroy the Ptolemaios and the remaining Gundams. Setsuna struggles with the monstrous Alvatore, but in the end succeeds in killing Alejandro. Graham Aker, an ace pilot of the United Nations Army, then challenges Setsuna to a fight, seeking revenge for his fallen comrades and questioning the purpose of the Gundams' existence. The fight results in the destruction of the GN-Flag, while the Exia is heavily damaged.

=== Season 2 ===
Four years have passed since the final battle between Celestial Being and the UN Forces. Humanity, having established the Earth Sphere Federation, forms an autonomous peace-keeping force, the A-Laws, separate from and above the formal Federation army. Given unfettered discretion, the A-Laws is charged with the duty to further unify nations, enforce the will of mankind, and dispose of terrorist cells. Unknown to the general public, however, is that the A-Laws misuse their power and employ inhumane tactics to oppress freedoms, doctrines, and ideologies, all in the name of 'unity'.

Meanwhile, Setsuna tries to confront the A-Laws by himself with his battered Gundam Exia, but is easily overpowered by their newer models. He is soon rescued by Tieria Erde, piloting his new mobile suit, the Seravee Gundam. By combining the GN Drives of Exia and 0 Gundam, Celestial Being's engineers manage to complete Aeolia's plans for an advanced mobile suit with twin GN drives – the 00 Gundam – which is entrusted to Setsuna. To pilot the two remaining new units, Lockon Stratos' twin brother is invited to assume his brother's codename and former position as the pilot of the Cherudim Gundam, and after Allelujah Haptism is rescued from the prison he was being detained in during the timeskip, he assumes the command of Arios Gundam. Saji Crossroad reluctantly joins Setsuna to pilot the upgraded 00 Raiser and confront his girlfriend Louise Halevy who has joined the A-Laws.

Unknown to Celestial Being and the A-Laws, a third party is manipulating both sides of the conflict. This group call themselves "Innovators", composed of Alejandro Corner's former assistant Ribbons Almark, and his six subordinates. Subsequently, it is revealed that Aeolia Schenberg's plan is to ensure humanity's survival; unite the world's factions through Celestial Being's armed interventions and then advance humanity into deep space and undergo Innovation, a trans-human process. It is revealed that Ribbons had a hand in many different historical events since Schenberg and intends to rule over humanity as a god-like figure, believing that he is now above the rest of humanity as an Innovator. Ribbons was even the pilot of the 0 Gundam during the Krugis incident and even gained the assistance of a recovered Ali Al-Saachez, who now pilots the Throne Arche.

After uncovering the truth about Ribbons' true intentions, Celestial Being joins forces with dissident members of the A-Laws to stop their oppression and bring the fight to the Innovades. Having been continuously exposed to the GN particles of the fully completed Gundam 00, Setsuna undergoes Innovation, becoming the first true Innovator with powers far greater than Ribbons and his group. After a long and arduous battle, Ribbons is forced to once again pilot the 0 Gundam, as the final confrontation caused extensive damage to both the 00 Gundam and Almark's own mobile suit, the Ribbons Gundam. In response to this, Setsuna swaps out his last surviving GN drive and uses it to restore Gundam Exia and destroying both the 0 Gundam and its pilot, bringing a definitive end to the conflict. Following the final battle, the Federation disbands the A-Laws and works towards a genuine global peace while Celestial Being returns into the shadows until another intervention is needed. The story continues in Mobile Suit Gundam 00 the Movie: A Wakening of the Trailblazer.

== Production ==
Character designs for Setsuna F. Seiei by Yun Kōga

=== Development ===
According to Hiroomi Iketani, one of the Gundam 00 producers, planning for the series started in 2005, under the tentative name "Next". Iketani approached Seiji Mizushima, who had previously worked on the first Fullmetal Alchemist anime series, for the first time at the end of 2005 to be the director. Mizushima was initially reluctant about accepting the job due to his lack of knowledge regarding the Gundam franchise.

The production staff, consisting of over 300 people, spent roughly two years planning the series. Compared to other anime shows, Gundam 00 has more main staff members, partly due to the detailed mobile suit designs.

=== Release ===
The series premiered on October 6, 2007, replacing Toward the Terra on the terrestrial MBS and TBS networks, occupying the networks' noted Saturday 6:00 p.m. timeslot. The first season ended its run on March 29, 2008. Season one of the series will be re-broadcast across Japan on various television networks such as TBS, Kids Station, MBS and BS-i from April onwards. Season two started its broadcast in the MBS and TBS Sunday 5:00 p.m. slot since October 5, 2008, replacing Code Geass R2.

A total of fourteen DVD collections have been released. The final DVD of season one contains a whimsical trailer for the second season. Featuring voice work by the four Meisters, the trailer lampoons many early ideas for the show, fan theories and anime clichés before leading into a special message from Mizushima and a preview of the 00 Gundam. Blu-ray disc collections were released on August 22, 2008.

A series of compilation films with new animated sequences and re-recorded dialogue, titled Mobile Suit Gundam 00 Special Edition, was also released. The first volume was released in Japan on October 27, 2009, in the DVD, Blu-ray Disc, and UMD format. While the first compilation film covered the first season, the remaining two covered the second season.

Licensing for a North American release of Mobile Suit Gundam 00 was announced by Bandai Entertainment at New York Comic Con 2008 on April 18, 2008. Mobile Suit Gundam 00 is the first Gundam series to air on national television in the United States since Mobile Suit Gundam SEED and began airing twice weekly on November 24, 2008, on SCI FI (now known as SyFy). The first season concluded its first run on Sci-Fi on February 9, 2009. The second season also aired on the same network and time slot on June 29, 2009, and concluded its run on September 21, 2009. Due to the closure of Bandai Entertainment, the series and film have been out of print. On October 11, 2014, at their 2014 New York Comic Con panel, Sunrise announced they will be releasing all of the Gundam franchise, including Gundam 00 in North America though distribution from Right Stuf Inc., beginning in Spring 2015. This will also include the previously unreleased Mobile Suit Gundam 00 Special Edition.

The English version (U.S. version) of Mobile Suit Gundam 00 premiered in the Philippines on November 20, 2010, on Cartoon Network Philippines and aired weekend nights as part of its Toonami block. Since the series aired on an early evening slot, a Parental Guidance warning was shown by the network before each episode due to its violent nature, and it was aired with minor edits. The letters PG are also shown on the upper left side of the screen for a few seconds after the opening credits and commercial breaks.

In Europe the series was licensed by Beez Entertainment.

=== Music ===
The series' music was composed by Kenji Kawai. There are four TV-series soundtracks released, the first on January 10, 2008, the second on March 26, 2008, the third on December 24, 2008, and the fourth on April 1, 2009. Kawai continues to compose the music in the film adaptation, and the soundtrack was released on September 22, 2010.

A series of character CDs has been announced; with the first one, featuring Setsuna F Seiei and the character's voice actor Mamoru Miyano, with a song written by the band Skoop On Somebody, to be released on August 13, 2008. The second entry to the series of character CDs, featuring Lockon Stratos and voice actor Shinichiro Miki, was released on September 24, 2008. The music for second character CD was done in collaboration with Eijun Suganami and Shinji Matsuda, members of The Back Horn.

== Media ==
=== Publications ===
A novelized version of Mobile Suit Gundam 00 was published by Kadokawa, currently ongoing with two volumes and authored by Noboru Kimura. The book series has been licensed by Bandai Entertainment and the first volume was released on December 29, 2009. The manga adaptation has also been licensed and was released in the United States on August 24, 2009.

A light novel series, Mobile Suit Gundam 00P was serialized in Dengeki Hobby and centers around the previous generation of Gundam Meisters. Like the anime, it was also divided into 2 seasons: First season is set 15 years before the anime series, while second season is set 10 years after season one. 00P features events that happened before the main story. It is penned by Tomohiro Chiba, with model conductions by Dengeki Hobby Magazine. The first volume of the sidestory was released in May 2008 by Dengeki Hobby. After the series ended, a sequel named Mobile Suit Gundam 00N was on serialization, taking place the same time as season one.

A graphic novel that features variations of existing mobile suits, Mobile Suit Gundam 00V, which was serialized in Hobby Japan, is told in the format of a mobile suit development history book published 20 years after the anime series, featuring photo guides of customized models. It centers around the Mobile Suit observer Robert Spacey and his encounters with the different mobile weapons in the Gundam 00 universe. A sequel entitled Mobile Suit Gundam 00V Senki has replaced 00V after its serialization ended. 00V's timeline happens between the end of season one and beginning of season two, and 00V Senki's timeline is after the ending of season two.

=== Manga ===
Four TV broadcast-based manga series exist to date. One was serialized in Kerokero Ace and drawn by Kouzoh Ohmori. Minor changes are present compared to the anime, such as the use of more visually comedic facial expressions, and the omission of certain characters and subplots. The first volume to this version was released on March 26, 2008, by Kadokawa Comics. It has been released in English in North America by Bandai Entertainment, with the first volume released on September 23, 2009.

The other manga adaptation series of the same name is also based on the television series, and is drawn by Auto Taguchi. Unlike the first manga series, this title is published by Kodansha. The two manga series essentially follow the same story as the anime's main plot, but vary in the sequence of events that unfold and in artistic style.

A manga sidestory entitled Mobile Suit Gundam 00F was serialized in Gundam Ace. Illustrated by Kōichi Tokita, this manga series focuses on Fereshte, an autonomous branch of Celestial Being that is also in possession of several previous generation Gundams. The series acts as a link for the main story to the 2 other sidestories and introduces the characters and mecha from the other publications. First volume to this title was released on March 26, 2008, by Kadokawa Comics. A sequel for 00F, called Mobile Suit Gundam 00I, was serialized in Gundam Ace after 00F. It is also illustrated by Kōichi Tokita and takes place in the same time as season two. It mainly focuses on Innovades, and few characters from 00F has appeared.

Another manga series based on the anime, Mobile Suit Gundam 00: Aoi Kioku, runs monthly on Kadokawa's Gundam Ace. This series focuses on the Gundam Meisters' memories and is illustrated by Tarō Shiguma.

A prelude to the film (drawn by Yun Kōga), "The place where the sky and earth meet", "Where Setsuna and Marina are... Two people tied together only by their spirits, divided by sky and earth", was published in Newtype in July 2010. This was followed by a 50-page-long manga version of the film by Kaishaku, published in Gundam Ace. in October 2010. This adaptation contained notable differences from the film, such as an alternate ending in which Setsuna uses his ELS powers to restore Marina's youth and marries her.

=== Film ===
A theatrical release was announced at the end of episode 25 of season 2, titled Mobile Suit Gundam 00 the Movie: A Wakening of the Trailblazer A new character is revealed to be the first officially acknowledged true Innovator, whose name is revealed to be Descartes Shaman. A new enemy appears to be a newly discovered alien life form, Extraterrestrial Livingmetal Shapeshifter (ELS). The Japanese premiere was announced for September 18, 2010. The year is 2314 AD, two years after Celestial Being's last great battle and the world faces a new crisis. A derelict Jupiter exploration ship, abandoned 130 years ago, has left its orbit and is approaching Earth. The ESF has also begun to exploit the power of Innovators through Descartes Shaman. The world's exposure to GN Particles has resulted in many people awakening as True Innovators. Realizing the military benefits of such individuals, the Earth Sphere Federation has begun to research Innovation and exploit the emerging Innovators' abilities.

Bandai Entertainment hosted the North American premiere of the film at New York Comic Con/New York Anime Festival. They later announced the license for the film. It was announced on September 13 that Singapore is going to be the first country to screen the Gundam 00 film with English subtitles on the same day as Japan, running from September 18 to September 29 in the Alliance Francaise Theatre.

The film was released on DVD & Blu-ray on December 25, 2010, in Japan.

=== Stage play ===
A stage play adaptation of the anime series titled Mobile Suit Gundam 00 Re:Build (機動戦士ガンダム00 -破壊による再生-Re:Build, Kidō Senshi Gandamu Daburu Ō – Hakai ni Yoru Saisei – Rī Birudo) premiered at the Nippon Seinenkan in Tokyo on February 15, 2019, and ran until February 18 before moving to the Morinomiya Piloti Hall in Osaka on February 23–24. The play starred Shohei Hashimoto as Setsuna F. Seiei, Yū Imari as Lockon Stratos, Taiyō Ayukawa as Allelujah Haptism, and Seiichirō Nagata as Tieria Erde. Gundam 00 Re:Build was released on DVD and Blu-ray on July 26, 2019.

A stage play adaptation of the second season of the anime series, titled Mobile Suit Gundam 00 -Hakai ni Yoru Saisei- Re:(in)novation, was scheduled to premiere at the New National Theatre in Tokyo on July 17, 2020 and run until July 26. The cast members included Shohei Hashimoto, Yū Imari, Taiyō Ayukawa, and Seiichirō Nagata who all reprised their respective roles from the first adaptation. Yuki Maekawa as Saji Crossroad, Sakiho Motonishi as Louise Halevy, and Yuichi Nakamura as Mister Bushido. Kodai Miyagi replaced Yusuke Seto as Patrick Colasour. And many other returning cast members with the exception of Akira Kubodera due to his death before the stage play, due to this, the character of Ali al-Saachez was dropped from the show instead of recasting him. This production was cancelled due to the outbreak of the Covid-19 pandemic, and rescheduled for February 2022. The two first productions of its February run were cancelled due to the pandemic.

=== Video games ===
A 3D action game based on the anime entitled Mobile Suit Gundam 00, published by Namco Bandai Games and produced by BEC for the Nintendo DS, was released on March 27, 2008. This game follows the anime's plot with slight variations, but lacks the introduction of the GN-X, ending with the entrance and introduction of Team Trinity instead.

A second video game, titled Mobile Suit Gundam 00: Gundam Meisters and developed by Yuke's for the PlayStation 2, was released on October 16, 2008, Capcom and published by Bandai (now known as Namco Bandai Games). Unlike the first Nintendo DS game, Mobile Suit Gundam 00: Gundam Meisters covers the first season's plot completely, albeit with slight deviations.

The first season of Gundam 00 is also included in the game Another Century's Episode Portable and also in 2nd Super Robot Wars Z ~Hakai Hen~. The second season, however, was included in SD Gundam G Generation World. The film's storyline was adapted in Super Robot Wars UX and later Super Robot Wars V.

Dynasty Warriors: Gundam 3, published by Namco Bandai Games, also features Gundam 00 characters.

=== CDs ===
A drama CD prequel entitled Mobile Suit Gundam 00 Another Story: Mission-2306 was released on July 23, 2008. In this drama CD, Setsuna F Seiei is tasked with the mission of preventing an assassination of Barry Halevy, the leader of a fossil fuel export regulation watchdog group, and protecting his daughter, Louise Halevy from terrorist organizations. A second drama CD, Mobile Suit Gundam 00 Another Story: Road To 2307, has been announced and is currently slated for a September 24, 2008, release. This drama CD will focus on the Meisters, as well as the Union's story. Unlike the first prequel CD drama, the second will have a comparatively much more serious tone, with stories that link to the original TV series.

A series of character CDs based around the concept of being a message to the character from the cast member who plays them will be released, starting from Setsuna's on August 13, 2008. Three original soundtracks and five singles, featuring the theme songs used throughout the first season, have also been released.

== Reception ==
=== Critical reception ===
After a sneak preview of Gundam 00 on September 1, 2007, Anime News Network remarked on "striking parallels" between the series and an earlier installment of the metaseries, Mobile Suit Gundam Wing (1995): "Like Gundam Wing, Gundam 00's main story begins with hyper-powerful Gundam units appearing at various locales to execute slightly-less-than-Dynasty-Warriors-level mayhem in synchronized phases of a paramilitary operation." Later on October 21, 2007, Carl Kimlinger of Anime News Network remarked that "its political flavour ... is distinctly post-9/11", noting the political and cultural similarities between the series and our modern society. Critics have praised the series for the smooth, detailed visual effects and animation.

"As for the production values, they're top-notch: the mecha and character designs are attractive, and the fights—especially the opening chase scene—are fluid and composed with an eye for maximum impact."

— Carl Kimlinger, Anime News Network

Following the end of the first season, Gundam 00 has received much critical acclaim. Carl Kimlinger of Anime News Network gave the first season a B+ rating, praising the second half of the season for its "unstoppable narrative momentum." He stated that its "sheer momentum is breathtaking, and even as coldly detached as the series is, the catastrophic fates in store for its cast make for compelling viewing," and concluded that "being swept up in the coalescing second half, the abrupt drop-off at the end only raises a raging thirst for season two." Chris Beveridge of Mania.com gave the first season a B rating, stating that as "this part of the series comes to a close, events become bigger than they were before and nobody is safe from change – or death." He concludes that the "culmination of this season does give me all that I like from a Gundam series as it tries to change the world and then throws you for a loop by moving everything ahead four years." Ross Liversidge of the UK Anime Network gave the first season a 9/10 score, concluding that it is "Everything Gundam should be – huge cast, lots of politics and big battles. Fans should be pleased."

Mamoru Miyano, the voice actor for Setsuna F Seiei, won the "Best Voice Actor" award at the 2008 Tokyo International Anime Fair. Miyano and Tieria Erde's voice actor, Hiroshi Kamiya, both won the "Best Main" and "Best Supporting Male Characters" respectively at the 2008 Seiyu Awards. In the United Kingdom, Gundam 00 was nominated for the 2009 NEO Award for Best Anime.

=== Popularity ===
While critically acclaimed, the first season of Gundam 00 experienced lower average viewer ratings than its predecessors Mobile Suit Gundam SEED and Mobile Suit Gundam SEED Destiny. Over its 25-episode run, it averaged a television viewer rating of 4.85% and peaked at 6.1%. On a more positive note, Gundam 00's average rating was higher than the other previous Gundam shows set in alternative universes such as Gundam Wing (which averaged 4.3%) and G Gundam (which averaged 4.1%). The viewer ratings for the second season of Gundam 00 had improved, reaching ratings as high as 6.3%.

The series was also a commercial success, with the DVDs showing consistently high sales of action figures and Gunpla. The third and seventh DVD release topped the anime DVD sales chart.

In a top 20 anime poll published in the April 2008 issue of Newtype, Japanese readers voted for Gundam 00 as the best anime, higher than its predecessor Gundam SEED, which was voted ninth. In Newtype's poll for top 10 male anime characters, Setsuna F Seiei was voted second, Tieria Erde third, Lockon Stratos fifth, Graham Aker sixth, and Allelujah Haptism at seventh; and in its poll for top ten female anime characters, Nena Trinity was voted eighth and Marina Ismail was voted tenth.

In the NHK's 2018 mega "All Gundam Poll", Mobile Suit Gundam 00 was place as the fourth best anime in the Gundam franchise, only behind the original 1979 Mobile Suit Gundam, Mobile Suit Zeta Gundam, and Mobile Suit Gundam SEED. The NHK reported that there was a total of 1,740,280 votes in the poll.

== Future ==
On April 14, 2018, the "Gundam 00 Festival 10 Re:vision" event in Tokyo announced that director Seiji Mizushima will be working on an anime sequel to Gundam 00, though it wasn't specified whether it would be a new season, OVA or film.

Preceded by Mobile Suit Gundam SEED C.E. 73: Stargazer	Gundam metaseries (production order); 2007–2009	Succeeded by Mobile Suit Gundam Unicorn
Preceded by None	Anno Domini; 2307 – 2312 AD	Succeeded by Mobile Suit Gundam 00 the Movie: A Wakening of the Trailblazer
