= Setsuna F. Seiei =

Character from Mobile Suit Gundam 00

- Mobile Suit Gundam 00 character
- Setsuna F. Seiei alongside his first Gundam, the GN-001 Gundam Exia, in Mobile Suit Gundam 00
- First appearance: Mobile Suit Gundam 00 episode 1
- Portrayed by: Shohei Hashimoto (stage play)
- Voiced by: Japanese; Mamoru Miyano; English; Brad Swaile

In-universe information
- Full name: Soran Ibrahim
- Nationality: Republic of Krugis
- Genetic type: Innovator

Setsuna F. Seiei (刹那・F・セイエイ, Setsuna Efu Seiei), whose real name is Soran Ibrahim (ソラン・イブラヒム, Soran Iburahimu), is a fictional character introduced as the protagonist of Sunrise's anime series Mobile Suit Gundam 00. Setsuna is a member of Celestial Being, an organization that aims to end all wars through the deployment of the revolutionary Gundam units in aggressive armed interventions. One of the Gundam pilots, also known as "Gundam Meisters," Setsuna remembers across the series his involvement in a war from the Middle East and wishes to find another way to end the conflict. He has also appeared in the direct film sequel Mobile Suit Gundam 00 the Movie: A Wakening of the Trailblazer as well as video games and manga series related with the Gundam franchise.

Setsuna was created as a Kurd because director Seiji Mizushima wanted to explore the situation people in the Middle East go through which forces them to participate in wars. He was also made to contrast previous Gundam characters who were relatable with the audience. Setsuna has been a popular character in Japan, where voice actor Mamoru Miyano received an award for the role, and within the Gundam fanbase, ranking highly in various polls. However, critical reception to Setsuna's character from English-language publications for anime, manga and other media has been mixed, criticizing his silent personality but praising his growth across the series.

== Character creation ==
Setsuna being a Kurd was an intentional decision by Sunrise. This was done as critique to Japan's apathy towards religion. Director Seiji Mizushima wanted to give viewers a close approach to the wars in the Middle East, believing the problem would not be solved in a long time. Mizushima aimed to make the viewers understand Setsuna's feelings as a result of living under war conditions. In regards to his personality, Mizushima wanted the series' protagonist that could not be related with the audience. This was done to contrast previous Gundam protagonists and appeal to young viewers. While he saw his past as difficult to understand he might look appealing as a result. The staff also wanted to create a character the audience could relate to. Late in the series, Setsuna's Qan[T] (Quantum) system was introduced in order to convey his message that he wants war to end through communication rather than violence. This idea was explored once again in the movie where the plot was written so that nobody except Setsuna could end the conflict.

== Appearances ==
=== Television series and film ===
Setsuna F. Seiei is the primary protagonist of Mobile Suit Gundam 00. He was discovered by Celestial Being at the age of 16 for having special potential as a pilot. He is a Gundam Meister and pilots Gundam Exia, specialized in melee combat. The group pursues the complete eradication of armed conflict mainly through the deployment of the revolutionary Gundam units in aggressive armed interventions. Setsuna's real name is Soran Ibrahim; with Setsuna being his codename. He was once a child soldier of Krugis descent in the war-torn Krugis Republic, being the sole survivor of an ill-fated all-youth suicidal commando battalion created by Ali Al-Saachez. During this time, he murdered his own parents under Ali Al-Saachez's influence in order to prove his devotion to God, and hence bears a deep hatred towards Saachez. Due to his previous religious brainwashing (and awakening from it), Setsuna claims he no longer believes in God, yet still debates the role of God in people's lives, suggesting that he would like to believe in God. Across the series, Setsuna appears mostly stoic being indifferent to potential love interests such as princess Marina Ismail.

In the first season's ending, Celestial Being becomes the target of the United Nations Army and Setsuna goes MIA in battle against Graham Aker. Four years later he rejoins Celestial Being as the pilot of 00 Gundam after Exia was severely damaged. During his fight against Innovators and then 00 QAN[T], Setsuna joins forces with his former neighbour Saji Crossroad who reclutantly pilots the GNR-010 0 Raiser which merges with the 00 Gundam to create the 00 Raiser. During his battles, Setsuna encounters the Innovators' leader Ribbons Almark who is responsible for his survival as a child. Being continuously exposed to the GN particles of the fully completed Gundam 00, Setsuna undergoes Innovation, becoming the first true Innovator with powers far greater than Ribbons and his group. He succeeds in defeating the Innovator and continues working with Celestial Being.

In the film sequel, Mobile Suit Gundam 00 the Movie: A Wakening of the Trailblazer, Setsuna and Celestial Being fight the ELS, an alien lifeform that has been attacking mankind. Setsuna falls into catatonia after attempting to share his consciousness which, by the burst of information he took, damaged his braincells but manages to recover upon seeing his lost allies in a dream. Piloting the GNT-0000 00 Qan[T], Setsuna makes contact with ELS, agrees to become humanity's liaison and uses the 00 Qan[T] and quantize to the ELS homeworld. Several years later, Setsuna, having become a part ELS, reunites with Marina.

=== In other media ===
Outside the anime series and the film Setsuna has also appeared in the printed media related with Gundam 00. The manga adaptation of the film gives a different author's interpretation of the ending in which Setsuna marries Marina though it is not canon considered symbolic and representative of their understanding of ideals. Setsuna's childhood is also explored in the first chapter of the manga Mobile Suit Gundam 00: Blue Memories. He also makes brief appearances in the manga Mobile Suit Gundam 00F. His activities in the movie are also seen in Mobile Suit Gundam 00I 2314.

Setsuna has also appeared in the Gundam 00 video games Mobile Suit Gundam 00 and Mobile Suit Gundam 00: Gundam Meisters. In Gundam crossover video games Setsuna appears in Dynasty Warriors series and was introduced in Dynasty Warriors: Gundam 3 and in Gundam vs where he first appeared in Mobile Suit Gundam: Gundam vs. Gundam Next. He also made his debut in the Super Robot Wars series in Super Robot Wars Z2. Additionally, he appeared in Another Century's Episode Portable with Gundam Exia and 00 Raiser.

Shohei Hashimoto portrays Setsuna in the 2018 stage play adaptation.

== Reception ==
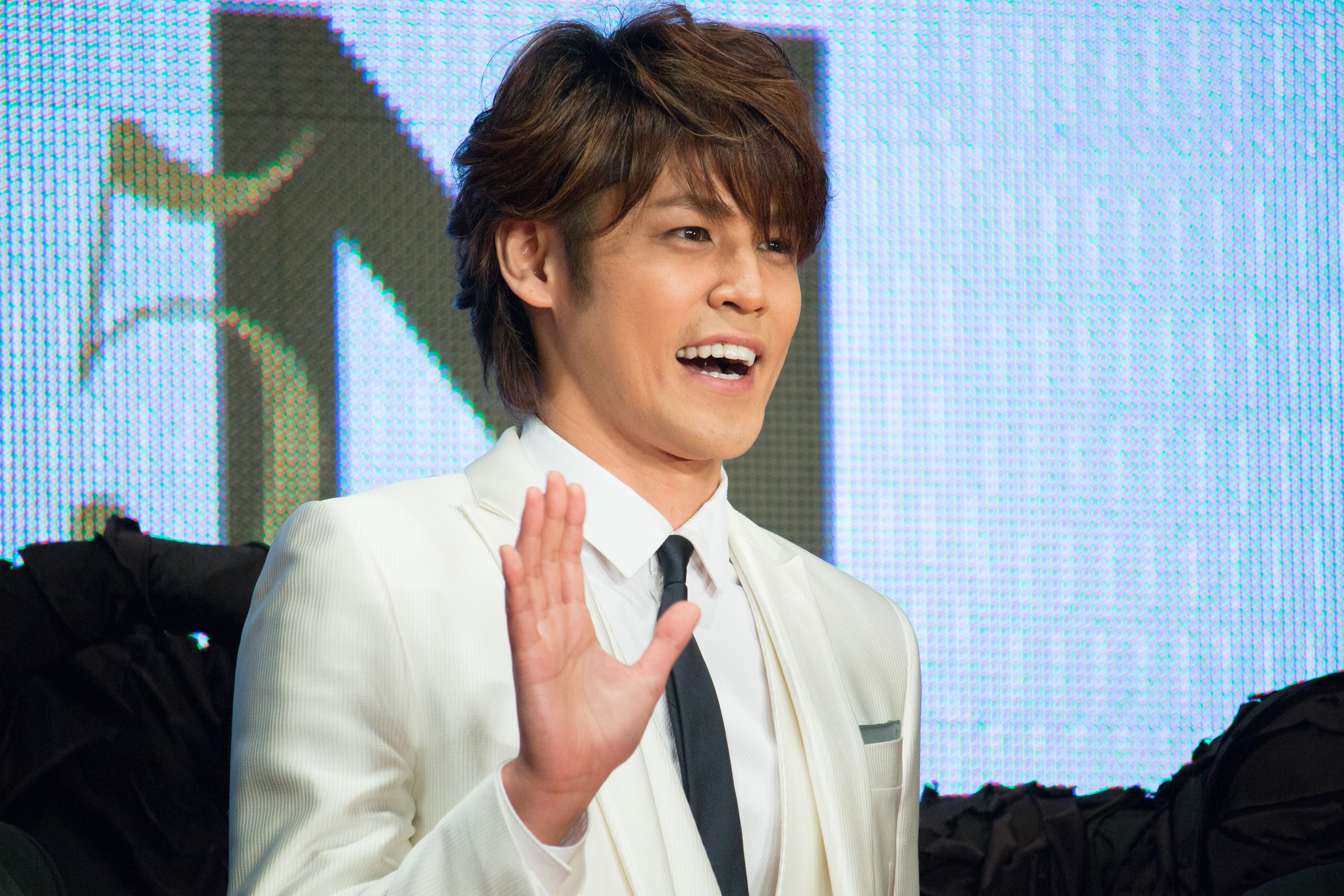
Mamoru Miyano, the Japanese actor for Setsuna

Setsuna has been a popular character in Japan. In a Newtype poll, he was voted as the 20th most popular male anime character from the 2000s. He appeared twice in Animage's Anime Grand Prix polls, first as second most popular male anime character in the 29th poll and the following year he was fifth. In another poll focused on all the characters appearing in the Gundam franchise, Setsuna was voted as the fifth popular out of all of them. In another poll from Sunrise's site that asked fans which character from the franchise would they would want to meet, Setsuna was sixth. In a NHK poll, he was voted as the sixth best Gundam character. Mamoru Miyano, the voice actor for Setsuna, won the "Best Voice Actor" award at the 2008 Tokyo International Anime Fair. The role from the English voice actor, Brad Swaile, was met with criticism in the series' beginning by Ramsey Isler from IGN.

Overseas, Setsuna has received mixed criticism from English-language publications for anime, manga and other media. He has often been compared with the protagonist from Mobile Suit Gundam Wing, Heero Yuy, based on how inexpressive the two characters are. This bothered Chris Beveridge from Mania Entertainment as the series appeared to be borrowing elements from previous shows despite finding Setsuna interesting. Ross Liversidge criticized Setsuna's personality and found the other members from the cast were far more appealing that him. Carl Kimlinger from Anime News Network agreed with Liversidge stating it was difficult to enjoy the character as he is "remarkable in his frosty unlikeability."

On the other hand, Setsuna's development across the series was the subject of praise. Nick Hartel from DVDTalk commented how Setsuna managed to stand as the series' hero in the first season thanks to his evolution. Kimlinger shared a similar a view as he commented on how Setsuna became "softer and more textured" which made him a more sympathetic character. In regards to his role in the movie Mark Sombillo from ANN compared his role with the one from The Matrix's main character Neo due to how Setsuna tries to understand his true purpose. Although Michael Toole from the same site noted that the audience liked the subplot involving his interactions with Feldt, it ended being "ooey-gooey romantic crap."
