= Seiji Mizushima =

Japanese anime director

- 水島 精二
- Born: January 28, 1966 (age 60); Fuchū, Tokyo, Japan
- Education: Tokyo Designer Gakuin College
- Occupation: Anime director
- Notable work: Shaman King; Fullmetal Alchemist; Mobile Suit Gundam 00; Un-Go; Concrete Revolutio; Beatless
- Awards: Individual Award (20th Animation Kobe)
- Website: hifumi-inc.co.jp/mizushima-seiji/

Seiji Mizushima (水島 精二, Mizushima Seiji; born on January 28, 1966) is a Japanese anime director who is known for such series as Shaman King, Fullmetal Alchemist, Mobile Suit Gundam 00, Un-Go, Concrete Revolutio, and Beatless. His first directorial film project, Fullmetal Alchemist the Movie: Conqueror of Shamballa, won the 60th Mainichi Film Award for Best Animation Film. In 2015, he won the Individual Award at the 20th Animation Kobe Awards.

His name is occasionally rendered in full katakana when he is in charge of episode directing or storyboarding. He is not related to Tsutomu Mizushima, who is also an anime director and shares his surname, but they often jokingly call each other "brother" on Twitter.

== Career and style ==
After graduating from Tokyo Designer Gakuin College (now Tokyo Net Wave), Mizushima joined Tokyo Animation Film. While being involved in the photography of Doraemon and Obocchama-kun, he studied under director of photography Masahiro Kumagai, and then went to work for Sunrise as a production assistant, aiming to become a full-fledged director. After leaving the company, he worked on video game cutscenes, and then moved on to animation.

For most of his directorial projects, Masafumi Mima serves as the sound director. In addition to Katsuyuki Konishi, who appears in most of his productions, he also actively uses voice actors he first used for his earlier projects in later works. A fan of Puffy AmiYumi, when he asked them to sing a theme song for an anime, they gladly agreed to it, which led them to sing the theme song of Oh! Edo Rocket. In addition, the August 2007 issue of Newtype featured a photo of Mizushima with a big smile on his face surrounded by Puffy.

Mizushima often mentions Hideaki Anno as an anime director that he respects, and when he was asked to direct Hanamaru Kindergarten by Gainax, a company that has a close relationship with him, he revealed that he accepted the job because it was a different direction for him and because it was meaningful to him to work with the staff. In addition, he highly praised Ayahi Takagaki, who appeared in the Mobile Suit Gundam 00 series, and praised "Kigurumi Planet", which was used as the ending theme for Hanamaru Kindergarten, as a song made possible only by her.

In 2011, he participated as a member of the selection and evaluation committee for the "Young Animator Training Project 2011" organized by the Japanese Animation Creators Association.

== Personal life ==
Mizushima has a hobby of egosurfing and has admitted that he searches for opinions of his work on social media platforms.

In May 2020, Mizushima expressed support for democracy in Hong Kong amid the 2019–2020 Hong Kong protests.

== Works ==
=== Anime television series ===
- Neon Genesis Evangelion (1995–10), episode director – As shown in the credits of episodes 9–12
- Generator Gawl (1998), director
- Dai-Guard (1999), director
- Shaman King (2001), director
- Fullmetal Alchemist (2003), director
- Oh! Edo Rocket (2007), director
- Mobile Suit Gundam 00 (2007–2009), director
- Kaitō Reinya (2010), sound director
- Hanamaru Kindergarten (2010), director
- Un-Go (2011), director
- Natsuiro Kiseki (2012), director
- Aikatsu! (2012), supervisor
- BlazBlue: Alter Memory (2013), collaborative director
- Wooser's Hand-to-Mouth Life: Mugen-hen (2015), director
- Concrete Revolutio (2015–2016), director
- Beatless (2018), director
- D4DJ First Mix (2020–2021), director
- D4DJ All Mix (2023), chief director
- Guilty Gear Strive: Dual Rulers (2025), associate producer

=== Original video animation (OVA) ===
- Zaion: I Wish You Were Here (2001), director – ONA
- Fullmetal Alchemist: Premium Collection (2006), director
- Escha Chron (2017), chief director

=== Anime films ===
- Fullmetal Alchemist: Conqueror of Shamballa (2005), director
- Mobile Suit Gundam 00 the Movie: Awakening of the Trailblazer (2010), director
- Un-Go episode:0 (2011)
- Expelled from Paradise (2014)
- Hula Fulla Dance (2021), chief director
- Expelled from Paradise: Resonance from the Heart (2026), director
- Eisen Flügel (TBA), chief director, screenplay
