= List of Mobile Suit Gundam SEED Astray characters =

This is a list of fictional characters from the Mobile Suit Gundam SEED Astray, Mobile Suit Gundam SEED Destiny Astray and Mobile Suit Gundam SEED VS Astray manga of the Gundam metaseries.

- [GSA] - Gundam SEED Astray
- [GSDA] - Gundam SEED Destiny Astray
- [GSVSA] - Gundam SEED VS Astray

== Three Ships Alliance ==
=== Crew of the Archangel ===
- Kojiro Murdoch (コジロー・マードック, Kojirō Mādokku) [GS/GSA/GSD] – Voiced by: Toshihiko Nakajima (Japanese); Ward Perry (English)

Ex-Earth Alliance, Natural; Archangel's original crew member. He is the chief engineer of the Earth Alliance Archangel. He is a father figure to the young crew of the Archangel, and aside from his gruff appearance, he learns to laugh it off. He is also fond of making puns now and then to relieve the pressure of working on board the ship. He is protective of the equipment on board the Archangel (especially the Skygraspers), and has repeatedly expressed unwillingness to let inexperienced personnel (Tolle Koenig or Cagalli Yula Athha) near them. In the Second Bloody Valentine War, he returns to the Archangel to assume his former position.

- Kira Yamato (キラ・ヤマト, Kira Yamato) [GS/GSA/GSD]

=== Crew of the Eternal ===
- Lacus Clyne (ラクス・クライン, Rakusu Kurain) [GS/GSA/GSD]
- Martin DaCosta (マーチン・ダコス) [GS/GSA/GSD]
- Andrew Waltfeld (アンドリュー・バルトフェルド, Andoryū Barutoferudo) [GS/GSA/GSD]

=== Crew of the Kusanagi ===
- Cagalli Yula Athha (カガリ・ユラ・アスハ, Kagari Yura Asuha) [GS/GSA/GSD]
- Asagi Caldwell (アサギ・コードウェル, Asagi Kōdoweru) [GS/GSA] – Voiced by: Sachi Matsumoto (Japanese); Jocelyne Loewen (English)

Ex-Orb, Natural; head of the M1 Astray squad on the Kusanagi, one of three test pilots of the Natural OS and the M1 Astray itself; killed on September 26, CE 71.

- Ledonir Kisaka (レドニル・キサカ, Redoniru Kisaka) [GS/GSA/GSD] – Voiced by: Isshin Chiba (Japanese); Adam Henderson (English)

Orb, Natural; Cagalli's guardian during her time with Desert Dawn, officer within the Orb military, and co-captain of the Kusanagi. In the Second Bloody Valentine War he is seen in an Earth Alliance uniform leading a group of defected Earth Alliance soldiers after Gilbert Durandal's speech against Logos. Shortly after, he rescues Athrun Zala and Meyrin Hawke who were shot down in their escape from ZAFT and turns them over to Archangel for medical treatment; pilots Waltfeld's old red/gold color MVF-M11C Murasame during ZAFT's invasion of Orb; remains behind in Orb with Cagalli after the Archangel heads to space.

- Mayura Labatt (マユラ・ラバッツ, Mayura Rabattsu) [GS/GSA] – Voiced by: Masayo Kurata (Japanese); Rebecca Shoichet (English)

Ex-Orb, Natural; third in command of Asagi's M1 Astray squad; killed when engaging an enemy ZGMF-600 GuAIZ on September 26, CE 71.

- Juri Wu Nien [GS/GSA] – Voiced by: Yūko Satō (Japanese); Sarah Johns (English)

Ex-Orb, Natural; one of the members on Asagi's M1 Astray squad, second in command; she tries to steal the MBF-P02 Astray Red Frame, piloted by Lowe Guele, in order to test its Natural OS; killed on September 26, CE 71 by one of the Earth Alliance's GAT-01 Strike Dagger.

- Erica Simmons [GS/GSA/GSD] – Voiced by: Michiyo Yanagisawa (Japanese); Sharon Alexander (English)

Chief designer in the Orb Union's military force and senior engineer of Morgenroete; she is a Coordinator; fails to develop a mobile suit operating system (OS) that would allow a Natural to fight on a similar level as a Coordinator, until the arrival of Kira Yamato and the Archangel, who help her construct an OS for the Orb Union's mobile suit, the MBF-M1 M1 Astray; later she helps rebuild the Strike and equips it with her OS system (which is later given to Mu La Flaga), and constructs the Strike Rouge on the Kusanagi near the end of the war. She joins the Three Ship Alliance so she could help the M1s in space. In Gundam SEED Destiny, she is among the many Orb personnel that are still loyal to Cagalli. She is married and has one son, Ryuta.

=== Others ===
- Jean Carry (ジャン・キャリー, Jan Kyarī) [GSA]

Jean Carry

When Jean was born as a first-generation Coordinator in the early 40s of the Cosmic Era, the acceptance of Coordinators was going very slowly, but his parents were killed in a Blue Cosmos terrorist attack when he was 15. Soon afterwards, George Glenn was assassinated, and the Type S2 influenza epidemic occurred, which served to strengthen anti-Coordinator sentiment. When the Bloody Valentine War started, Jean was drafted into ZAFT and piloted a ZGMF-1017 GINN in a white paint scheme. However he joined the Earth Alliance as he opposed his ZAFT conscription, fighting against his own people by disabling their suits as much as possible. When the Earth Alliance built the G-Unit prototypes and later built prototype MP (mass production) units, Jean retired his old GINN for a white GAT-01D Long Dagger and fought against Yzak Joule and his GAT-X102 Duel "Assault Shroud" at the Battle of Porta Panama. Jean was nearly killed when his Long Dagger was disabled by the Gungnir, but Yzak refused to fight him because he was defenseless. After the Battle of Porta Panama, Jean went AWOL from Captain Cornell, his commanding officer, and went on the run with his Long Dagger until the Junk Guild took him on; Jean stayed on board the ReHOME until they joined the Three Ships Alliance, when he transferred over to the Kusanagi. There, he took one of the MBF-M1 Astrays and painted it in a white color scheme. He piloted the suit at the Second Battle of Jachin Due, where he performed admirably, protecting both the Kusanagi and the Eternal with Barry Ho's own M1A Astray covering him. After the Bloody Valentine War, he remained a part of the newly created Terminal, and still piloted his M1 Astray. In C.E. 73, he piloted his M1 Astray (albeit equipped with a heavily modified Verne flight unit) against the ZGMF-YX21R Proto Saviour, which he defeated

- Barry Ho [GSDA]

Ex-Orb, Natural; an Orb ace pilot and protector of the Orb vessel Kusanagi, pilots a MBF-M1A Astray; a skilled pilot and martial arts master with the nickname "God of Fist" (though he is an atheist, with the word "Godless" painted on his M1A Astray), he is extremely shy with women. Apparently after the Second Battle of Jachin Due he leaves the Kusanagi. He reappears in the Amazon Forest, where he saves Junk Guild personnel Yoon Sefan from Courtney Hieronimus and the ZGMF-X999A ZAKU Trial Type. He later assists the U.S.S.A. in their fight against the Atlantic Federation forces.

- Edward Harrelson [GSA/GSDA]

An ace pilot, Edward (sometimes known by his nickname Ed the Ripper) has fought for the United States of South America and the Earth Alliance/OMNI Enforcer. Edward Harrelson was born in CE 43, and by 28, he became a fighter pilot for the USSA, but was later integrated into the Earth Alliance's military when the Earth Alliance conquered the USSA. He has an ordinary record as a fighter pilot, but when piloting mobile suits, he distinguished himself with excellent hand-to-hand combat skills. He has earned the nickname "Ed the Ripper" and is said to be "the strange man who uses his fighter in close combat". He earned the nickname when he used the F-7D Spearhead's wing to slice an AME-WAC01 DINN Electronic Installation Type in half, and after a battle, he usually comes back with his suit/fighter soaked in oil, as if it were blood. Underneath the combat experience, however, Harrelson is a gentle man, and is trusted by all his subordinates. During his time in the Earth Alliance, he developed a romantic relationship with fellow mobile suit pilot Jane Houston, a prominent member of the USSA rebellion against the Earth Alliance. They later dissolved the relationship for unknown reasons.

- Jane Houston [GSA/GSDA]

Natural; Earth Alliance Ensign, and underwater ace pilot, pilots a prototype GAT-X255 Forbidden Blue and a GAT-706S Deep Forbidden mass production amphibious mobile suit; nicknamed "White Whale" by ZAFT pilots for her underwater prowess; former lover of Edward Harrelson. Fights against Ed during the U.S.S.A. War for Independence, but later joins his cause.

- Rena Imelia [GSA/GSDA]

Natural; Earth Alliance ace pilot and combat instructor, pilots GAT-01D1 Duel Dagger Fortressa, GAT/A-01E2 Buster Dagger, and GAT-X133 Sword Calamity Unit 1; while a Natural, Rena has hand-eye coordination comparable to a Coordinator's, and it is speculated that she might able to pilot a Mobile Suit using a Coordinator-compatible OS. Initially trains Earth Alliance's mobile suit pilots, including the intended pilots of the GAT-X units, but is later reassigned as a combat pilot; also known by the nickname "Sakura Burst", referring to both her combat style in the Buster Dagger and to a burn scar on her right shoulder.

==== Phantom Pain/81st Autonomous Mobile Group ====
- Matisse Aducarf [GSDA]

Natural; The sister of Matias, Matisse commands a Phantom Pain detachment on behalf of Logos which includes the captured RGX-00 Testament and RGX-04 Proto Saviour, both piloted by brainwashed Coordinators. Matisse ensures that the Break the World terrorist attack will succeed by interfering with a Junk Guild operation to stop it, and may also have manipulated the Patrick Zala loyalists into carrying out the attack in the first place. Matisse is killed when her brother Matias activates the self-destruct of her Girty Lue-class flagship, completing his betrayal of Logos.

- Stella Loussier (ステラ・ルーシェ, Sutera Rūshe) [GSDA]
- Auel Neider (アウル・ニーダ, Auru Nīda) [GSDA]
- Sting Oakley (スティング・オークレー, Sutingu Ōkurē) [GSDA]

==== Blue Cosmos/Logos ====
- Matias Adukurf [GSDA]

Natural; a wealthy and mysterious industrialist who runs Adukurf Mechano-Industries, which produces large mobile armors and the GFAS-X1 Destroy for the Earth Alliance. Matias speaks like a woman and claims to have "no grasp of history", hiring photojournalist Jess Rabble to record history for him as it occurs. He is a high-ranking member of Blue Cosmos and the secret society LOGOS, but is a double-agent who provides information to PLANT Supreme Council Chairman Gilbert Durandal. Shortly after the Break the World terrorist attack, Matias kills himself and his sister Matisse by self-destructing her Girty Lue-class flagship.

- Lord Djibril (ロード・ジブリール, Rōdo Jiburīru) [GSDA]

== Eurasian Federation ==
- Balsam Arendo [GSA]

Natural; Eurasian Federation ace pilot, pilots the CAT1-X2/3 Hyperion Unit 2; the self-proclaimed "Eagle of Artemis"; killed by Canard when deserting from the Eurasian Federation.

- Morgan Chevalier (モーガン・シュバリエ, Mōgan Shubarie) [GSA/GSDA]

Morgan Chevalier

Morgan is an ace pilot for the Earth Alliance's Eurasian Federation, like space combat ace Edward Harrelson, underwater ace Jane Houston, mobile suit instructor-turned ace Rena Imelia and fellow countryman Canard Pars. In Gundam SEED Astray, before the introduction of mobile suits into the Earth Alliance, Chevalier was a 48-year-old commander of the Linear tank Fleet in the Eurasian Federation. He started to study Mobile Suits after a handful of them under Andrew Waltfeld's command nearly destroyed his entire squad. The first mobile suit he piloted was a GAT-01 Strike Dagger, and he became an ace quickly. Later on, Morgan piloted a rare GAT-01A1 Dagger (a.k.a. "105 Dagger") mobile suit equipped with an equally rare AQM/E-X04 Gunbarrel Striker pack, indicating that he had a high spatial awareness, like Mu La Flaga, Prayer Reverie, and Rau Le Creuset; he used his abilities quite effectively. It was believed that Morgan fought at the Second Battle of Jachin Due and died in that battle, as there was only one Gunbarrel Dagger that participated, and it was subsequently lost. However, Morgan did indeed survive, as he appears in the side-story Gundam SEED Destiny Astray, which takes place between Gundam SEED and Gundam SEED Destiny.
In Gundam SEED X Astray, Morgan appears to stop Canard Pars, who had stolen a Neutron Jammer Canceller from the Ptolemaeus Lunar base. In their confrontation he pilots the Gunbarrel 105 Dagger and fights against Canard in his CAT1-X1/3 Hyperion Unit 1. Despite his talent he is defeated by Canard but survives because Prayer Reverie warns him with his spatial awareness abilities.
In Gundam SEED Destiny Astray, Morgan was one of the aces sent to take down Edward Harrelson, who had gone AWOL and was wanted for treason. Morgan leaked out false information about a missile attack on the continent of South America to lure Edward into space so he could stop the attack by dropping into the base quickly. In space, Morgan was able to utilize his gunbarrels to fight Edward and defeated his GAT-333 Raider Full Spec; however, Edward managed to escape by riding a wave to Earth, similar to how Lowe Guele did.

Morgan also appears in Gundam SEED Destiny Astray, piloting a TS-MA4F Exus and attempting to help ZAFT's Riika Sheder defeat the RGX-04 Proto-Saviour, stolen by Circus pilot Ile De Lloar. It is questionable if later, in early C.E. 74, during the ZAFT/Alliance attack on LOGOS's "Heaven's Base" in Iceland, Chevalier led a squad of 105 Daggers in the attack. Morgan joined Terminal with help from Jean Carrey, alongside Riika, and Edward.
In SD Gundam G Generation series and Gundam Wars card game, due to a more user friendly setting, he is listed as a Newtype instead of a different ability of spatial awareness. However, this is not the official story settings. He also appears as an enemy in Super Robot Wars W, and is also briefly playable in one mission.

- Gerard Garcia [GSA] – Voiced by: Katsuhisa Houki (Japanese); Scott McNeil (English)

Natural; Admiral in Eurasian Federation forces, in charge of the Artemis asteroid fortress in Earth orbit at Lagrange point 3; wants to take advantage of the situation and steal the Archangel and the GAT-X105 Strike from the Atlantic Federation when it is being pursued by the Le Creuset team. Unfortunately for him, the GAT-X207 Blitz uses its Mirage Colloid to sneak in undetected and lay waste to Artemis's defenses right when he tries to force Kira Yamato to remove the lock on the Strike's OS. He is ultimately crushed by a Moebius unit shot down by Dearka Elsman in the GAT-X103 Buster. In Gundam SEED Astray, however, after the "Umbrella of Artemis" is destroyed by the Blitz and the Archangel has escaped, he contracts the Serpent Tail mercenary company for defense of the base; holds Elijah Kiel hostage when he wants to acquire the Astray Red Frame to make up for the loss of the Strike; when Gai Murakumo fights with Lowe Guele and successfully brings the Red Frame close to the control room, the situation reverses and Garcia is held hostage by Elijah. As shown in X Astray, he is spared by the Serpent Tail, and becomes Canard Pars commander. However, his failure to acquire the N-Jammer Canceller prior to the Atlantic Federation receiving it from Rau Le Creuset through Flay Allster results in him being demoted. His eventual fate post-SEED remains unknown.

- Canard Pars (カナード・パルス, Kanādo Parusu) [GSA/GSDA]

Canard is a member of the Earth Alliance's Eurasian Federation where he served as a special operative and piloted the CAT1-X1/3 Hyperion Unit 1.
He is a failed prototype of the same "Ultimate Coordinator" project that produced Kira Yamato and is the sole survivor of the failures and one of only two survivors of the project as a whole. Although he is a failed Ultimate Coordinator, his abilities are still comparable to, perhaps even superior, to regular Coordinators.
Canard Pars is voiced by Souichiro Hoshi in the video game "Mobile Suit Gundam SEED Destiny: Generation of CE". Both of Hoshi's roles, the other being Kira Yamato, are the only known survivors of the Ultimate Coordinator project.

- Meriol Pistis [GSA/GSDA]

Natural; Captain of Agamemnon class carrier Ortigia; has a strong grudge against the Atlantic Federation; works with Canard, who she cares for, and turns against Garcia when he orders Canard's arrest; aids Canard as a mercenary after the war.

== PLANT/ZAFT ==
=== Le Creuset team ===
- Miguel Aiman (ミゲル・アイマン, Migeru Aiman) [GS/GSA]

=== Minerva pilots ===
- Shinn Asuka (シン・アスカ, Shin Asuka) [GSD/GSDA]

=== Other Pilots ===
- Ash Gray [GSA]

Coordinator; ZAFT Special Forces Ace Pilot, Coordinator that has extra eyes on his forehead (though these may just be tattoos); pilots the ZGMF-X11A Regenerate; is presumed to be killed by Lowe and Gai. But he is recovered by the Earth Alliance, put under the Alliance "Extended" program and made the pilot of the stolen ZGMF-X12A/RGX-00 Testament. Commits suicide by exiting his mobile suit in space without sealing his pilot suit after defeat during a duel with ZGMF-X12D Astray Outframe D.

- Shiho Hahnenfuss [GSA]

Coordinator; wears the red uniform of the ZAFT ace pilots; she researches the beam weapon systems on the new CGUE Deep Arms because there are many problems and with help from Yzak she is able to complete the mobile suit; nicknamed the "Housenka" (Balsam) by Yzak Joule because of her combat skills (since beams are shooting out in all directions like a blossoming flower), and she wears the balsam as her personal mark; pilots the ZGMF-515 CGUE and YFX-200 CGUE DEEP Arms. Assigned to the Joule Squadron before the end of the Bloody Valentine War, she participates in the Second Battle of Jachin Due and has fought against Earth Alliance force's female ace pilot "Sakura Burst" Rena Imelia. After the war, Shiho leaves the Joule squad briefly to fight in the independence war of the U.S.S.A.; after Yzak returns to the frontline Shiho rejoins the Joule squad and pilots a custom ZGMF-1000/M Blaze ZAKU Warrior. She seems to have romantic feelings towards Yzak, but he does not notice them.
- Shiho is voiced by Makiko Ōmoto in related video games.

- Courtney Heironimus [GSA/GSDA]
- Riika Sheder [GSDA]

Coordinator; with the rare condition of blindness at birth even though she is a Coordinator; wears glasses when in uniform, and specialized goggles when in her pilot suit; test pilot for the ZGMF-X88S Gaia; wears the red uniform of an elite pilot; pilots a purple ZGMF-1001/M Blaze ZAKU Phantom.

- Mare Strode [GSDA]

Coordinator; test pilot for the ZGMF-X31S Abyss, and becomes jealous of Shinn Asuka; hates the Naturals; after the test he was chosen as the Abyss's formal pilot, but during the Armory One incident he is severely injured by Stella Loussier. Around the time of the Junius Seven drop, he pilots a Destiny Impulse unit.

- Goud Vair [GSA/GSVSA]

Coordinator; originally a soldier of the ZAFT forces, and later leaves the military because he hates the war; he is a ZAFT ace along with Miguel Aiman & Elijah Kiel, and he is the best of the three and wears the red ace uniform; with his outstanding skills he brought ZAFT many victories turning the tide to OMNI ENFORCERS Mass Forces; during and after the Eleven Month War, Goud develops a split personality problem, one personality is kind, helpful, the other is revengeful and wants to kill anyone around him, including Elijah Kiel; he pilots a customized red colored GINN; known as "The Hero Of ZAFT" because once when all friendly forces are annihilated he defeats the enemy fleet single-handedly; in the next year he does not lose once and opposing enemies are always worried about their fleets being annihilated by him; bad noises cause his fierce personality to come out, while soothing music such as the songs of Lacus Clyne calm him down and the gentle side resurfaces; when the Earth Alliance fleet attacks the Literia space colony, Goud launches and his fierce personality starts to surface, and he fights Elijah; he is defeated by Gai Murakumo who is accompanying the EA forces; Goud then begs Elijah to kill him as a friend to end his suffering at the Literia space colony. A Carbon Human Clone of himself appeared in Gundam SEED VS Astray, piloting the LV-ZGMF-X23S Vent Savior.

=== Council Members ===
- Eileen Canaver [GS/G] – Voiced by: Naomi Shindou (Japanese); Lisa Ann Beley (English)

Coordinator; the youngest member of the PLANT Supreme Council and the head of the diplomatic committee. She is Siegal Clyne's right hand on the council and deputy leader of the moderate faction. Becomes interim chairwoman after Siegel Clyne's, and subsequently Patrick Zala's, death; retires prior to the start of the Second Bloody Valentine War.

- Gilbert Durandal (ギルバート・デュランダル, Girubāto Dyurandaru) [GSD/GSDA]

== Other ==
- Bernadette Leroux [GSDA]

Coordinator; member of PLANT's official press organization; she has her own team which has many talents and resources; she has a strong sense of justice toward her reports.

- Diller Rojo [GSA]

Coordinator; a PLANT civilian sent to the Mendel colony to locate any data regarding the DNA of George Gleen. Had met up with Lowe and Kisato for a short time. Pilots a UTA/TE-6 GOOhN Underground Mobility Test Type mobile suit.

== Orb Union ==
=== Royal family ===
==== Athha ====
- Cagalli Yula Athha (カガリ・ユラ・アスハ, Kagari Yura Asuha) [GSA]

==== Sahaku ====
Rondo Ghina Sahaku and Rondo Mina Sahaku were fraternal twins and Coordinators who were members of the Orb Union's nobility. While Rondo Ghina was male and Rondo Mina was female, the two looked nearly identical. The defining difference between the two were their attitudes, while Ghina was highly aggressive, Mina was more calm and empathetic than her brother.

In addition to their appearance, they also shared the desire for Orb to rule the Earth Sphere. While Ghina was both tyrannical and aggressive, Mina was benevolent and democratic. To achieve that goal, Ghina initiated Morgenroete's collaboration with the Earth Alliance in building the G Project mobile suits on Heliopolis. While providing genuine assistance, Morgonroete also stole data on many elements of the G Project in order to create their own prototype mobile suits, the MBF-P01 Astray Gold Frame, MBF-P02 Astray Red Frame, and MBF-P03 Astray Blue Frame. When Heliopolis came under ZAFT attack, Morgenroete planned to destroy the Astrays and erase all evidence of their actions, but Ghina had other ideas. He uploaded a prototype Natural-use operating system into the Red Frame and data on multiple hardware upgrades into the Blue Frame, then escaped the colony using the Gold Frame and a heavy bazooka Morgonroete had designed for the GAT-X102 Duel. However, his intent to recover the other two Astrays was inadvertently thwarted by a Junk Guild team and the Serpent Tail mercenaries, who took possession of the Red Frame and the Blue Frame.

Later, shortly after the death of their father Koto Sahaku left Ghina as the head of the family, the Sahakus acquired several powerful Earth Alliance mobile suits, piloted by Socius series Combat Coordinators, through secret arrangements with Blue Cosmos leader Muruta Azrael (who most likely was unaware of the Sahakus being Coordinators), and also carried out covert missions on behalf of Azrael. These missions, carried out personally by Ghina as the pilot of the Gold Frame, eventually led to conflict with the pilots of Orb's lost Red Frame and Blue Frame, Junk Guild technician Lowe Guele and Serpent Tail leader Gai Murakumo, respectively. The first two battles proved inconclusive, but the third cost Ghina his life at Gai's hands.

With the death of her brother, Mina's ambitions waned and she was content to simply defend the Ame-no-Mihashira and protect the refugees from terrestrial Orb who had gathered there after its fall. After the war's end, Mina dispersed the forces under her command to await the restoration of the Orb Union. Later, Mina and three of her Socius clones joined forces with the Junk Guild and Serpent Tail (whose roles in Ghina's death she remains unaware of) in a failed attempt to stop the "Break the World" terrorist attack by shooting Junius 7's remains with GENESIS Alpha.

Shortly afterward, Mina was a guest at the wedding of Cagalli Yula Athha and Yuna Roma Seiran, and witnessed the "abduction" of Cagalli by her twin brother Kira Yamato. When Martian pilot Agnes Brahe attempted to pursue Kira in his GSF-YAM01 Δ Astray, Mina boarded Amatu and blocked his path, convincing him that "rescuing" Cagalli would not be in her best interest.

At their height, the Sahaku family's military forces consisted of the space fortress/mobile suit factory Ame-no-Mihashira (August Pillar of Heaven, named from a Japanese creation myth), the battleship Izumo, the MBF-P01-Re2<AMATU> Astray Gold Frame Amatu, a GAT-X133 Sword Calamity, a GAT-X255 Forbidden Blue, a GAT-333 Raider Full Spec, two GAT-01D Long Daggers, and numerous MBF-M1 and MBF-M1A Astray mobile suits. Approximately ten of these mobile suits were piloted by Socius clones.

Rondo Ghina Sahaku was voiced by Nobuo Tobita in the video game "Mobile Suit Gundam SEED Destiny: Generation of CE". On a side note, Tobita has been the voice of Kamille Bidan since Mobile Suit Zeta Gundam in 1985. Ironically, the man who kills Rondo Ghina, Gai Murakamo, is voiced by Kazuhiko Inoue, who voiced Kamille's archrival Jerid Messa. The character roles however are switched.

It is perhaps interesting to note in the Tokyopop translation, both Rondos are translated as sisters.

== Junk Guild ==
- 8 [GSA/GSDA]

Artificially Intelligent quantum computer found by Lowe on a drifting space shuttle; named for the only visible writing on its casing; serves as a co-pilot for Lowe Guele's Astray Red Frame and later Jess Rabble's Astray Out Frame.
- Initially, 8 was implied to be the learning computer from Amuro Ray's RX-78-2 Gundam; the craft Lowe found 8 in was highly similar to the Gundam's damaged Core Fighter, and its casing has several scratched-out letters and numbers, which appear to have been "RX-78". However, this implication is downplayed in Destiny Astray.

- Liam Garfield [GSA/GSDA]

Coordinator (he is a Coordinator with gene modifications while his twin brother is a Natural, since the Garfields wanted to bridge the gap between Naturals and Coordinators); because of his unique background he has a habit of observing the Naturals' behaviors (especially Lowe); a member of the Junk Guild, pilots a customized Kimera and a Works GINN.

- Lowe Guele (ロウ・ギュール, Rou Gyūru) [GSA/GSDA/GSVSA]

Natural; Lowe is a technician from the non-governmental organization the Junk Guild and pilot of one of three Astray prototypes, the MBF-P02 Astray Red Frame. Although he is a Natural, Lowe can pilot the Red Frame with the assistance of an artificially intelligent quantum computer called 8, which he salvaged from an abandoned spacecraft. Born in C.E. 51, he joined the Junk Guild when he was 16 years old. He is a mechanic genius and could fix any problem usually at the first glance. He believes himself to be "The Luckiest Bastard" because he has good fortune, and can get out of tight situations.

- The Professor [GSA/GSDA]

Natural; real name and her past unknown; brilliant scientist and captain of the HOME, and a close friend of Morgenroete's Erica Simmons; creates a holographic body for George Glenn so that she won't have to bother with commanding the ReHOME.

- Prayer Reverie (プレア・レヴェリー, Purea Reverī) [GSA/GSDA/GSVSA]

Coordinator; He is the former pilot of the experimental ZAFT DRAGOON suit YMF-X000A Dreadnought that was used by the Junk Guild before he apparently died due to genetic complications. He is a young boy with strong spatial awareness. On one occasion, Prayer has a memory of piloting TS-MA2mod.00 Moebius Zero mobile armor, but it is unclear whether this is his own memory or a vision he received from a pilot in the Moebius Zero corps, which is likely to have consisted mostly or entirely of people having high spatial awareness. On another, he saved Morgan Chevalier from death by sending a psychic message. Also, it appears that he was under the tutelage of Reverend Malchio, who called him "The Son of Destiny". Even after the war, Prayer's origins are still unknown, though there is speculation that he is a failed Al Da Flaga clone. According to Rau Le Creuset, before he was created, there were several unsuccessful attempts to clone Al Da Flaga, and Prayer could be one of these "faulty" clones. Like Le Creuset, Prayer suffered from painful effects of his genetic flaws. However, it can also be speculated that he could actually be a clone of Mu La Flaga himself. His vision about piloting a Moebius Zero strengthens this assumption; his age also fits, making it very plausible. He was dispatched by Reverend Malchio in July CE 71 to take possession of the YMF-X000A Dreadnought and bring it back to Earth, so that the Reverend can use its N-Jammer Canceler technology to end the energy crisis on Earth. Unfortunately, the N-Jammer Canceler within the suit is a prized commodity that is hunted by ZAFT, the Serpent Tail, and the Eurasian Federation (in particular Canard Pars). Prayer fought several battles against Canard Pars and his CAT1-X1/3 Hyperion Unit 1; Canard himself is considered a failure because he is the only failed "Ultimate Coordinator" "prototype" to survive. In their final battle, the Hyperion Unit 1 is destroyed, but Prayer protects Canard from the explosion of Hyperion's nuclear reactor. Unfortunately, Prayer later apparently dies from unknown causes. However, it is later revealed that he is alive and faked his death in the hope that it would cause Canard to change for the better. Prayer at times reveals himself to Canard via his mysterious powers to help calm him. He then returns in Gundam SEED VS Astray, piloting the LN-ZGMF-X13A Nix Providence as part of the Librarian.

- Yoon Sefan [GSA/GSDA]

Natural; the clumsy former Morgenroete Inc. engineer, joined the Junk Guild after being left behind during the evacuation of Orb before its destruction at the hands of EA forces; designer of the MWF-JG71 Raysta civilian-use mobile suit and pilot of a custom Raysta. Encountered Courtney Hieronimus and the ZGMF-X999A ZAKU Trial Type but was saved by Barry Ho.

- Kisato Yamabuki [GSA/GSDA] – Voiced by: Masayo Kurata (Japanese)

Natural; fellow Junk Tech with Lowe, Liam, and the Professor; she has the hobby of collecting memorabilia of the First Coordinator George Glenn; lacks self confidence and easily frightened when there is fighting; pilots a custom Kimera and later a modified version of the BuCUE Andrew Waltfeld Custom. Has a crush on Lowe.

== Serpent Tail ==
- Kazahana Aja [GSA/GSDA] – Voiced by: Yu Kobayashi (Japanese)

Coordinator; 6 years old, highly intelligent daughter of Loretta; because of her background she has adult-like judgement and mental toughness, and she serves as liaison to Serpent Tail's clients.

- Loretta Aja [GSA/GSDA] – Voiced by: Kumiko Nishihara (Japanese)

Natural; the only woman among members of Serpent Tail; explosives expert and tactician; mother to Kazahana Aja; very popular among the mercenaries. Former member of the Earth Alliance, left to have a Coordinator child (Kazahana).

- Elijah Kiel [GSA/GSDA] – Voiced by: Toriumi Katsumi (Japanese)

Coordinator/Natural; Gai's wingman, only member to wear a ZAFT uniform pilots a custom ZGMF-1017 GINN, a ZGMF-1001 ZAKU, each with a blade-like head crest, and later the LV-ZGMF-X23S Vent Savior; before joining Gai he was with ZAFT alongside his best friend Goud Vair (whom he killed as Goud begged him as a friend to end his suffering due to the split personality); he has a very handsome look; although he is a Coordinator he does not possess the superior physiology of Coordinator, so his mobile suit maneuvering skills are poor; through the experiences he gained on the battlefield as a mercenary, however, he polished his maneuvering skills, and has improved substantially. On his mobile suit "2" is incorporated on its Serpent Tail emblem. Elijah's GINN has great sentimental value, since he used parts from Vair's GINN to repair it; this is why he continued to pilot the GINN even as it became greatly outdated, switching to his new ZAKU only because his GINN was badly damaged. In Gundam SEED VS Astray, he now pilots the Vent Savior after his last battle with Vair, who somehow is a part of the group called the "Librarian".

- Gai Murakumo [GSA/GSDA] – Voiced by: Inoue Kazuhiko (Japanese)

Coordinator; a shrewd mercenary with excellent battle sense and the leader of the Serpent Tail mercenary company, and pilot of the MBF-P03 Astray Blue Frame; first meets Lowe Guele at the remains of Heliopolis; he goes where the money takes him, and is friends with fellow pilot Elijah Kiel; nobody knows his past, when he was actually a Combat Coordinator developed by the group "Socius" of the Earth Alliance for combat use. His combat ability was completed at a high level, but his mental control was incomplete when he escaped the research facility. On his mobile suit "1" is incorporated on its Serpent Tail emblem.
- His surname is derived from "Ama-no-Murakumo", the name of the legendary Japanese sword which Susanowo pulled from the tail of the slain Yamato no Orochi and presented to his sister, the Sun goddess Amaterasu, as a reconciliation gift. Also called Kusanagi, it is the sword of the Japanese Imperial regalia.

- Reed Wheeler [GSA/GSDA] – Voiced by: Hidenari Ugaki (Japanese)

Natural; captain of Serpent Tail's Laurasia -class frigate; former Earth Alliance intelligence operative and still has contacts with the Earth Alliance; known alcoholic.

== Librarian Works ==
- ND-HE [GSVSA]

Carbon Human; A Mysterious member of the Organization named the Librarian Works and the pilot of the LG-GAT-X105 Gale Strike. His true identity is a big mystery due to the mask he always wears on his face to conceive his identity. But he has some good combat skills and his piloting abilities were exceptional in the battlefield. His name means "No Data High Error".

- Finis Socius [GSVSA]

Coordinator; A Socius Coordinator, Finis is another member of the Librarian Works who was created by the Earth Alliance. Since Socius Coordinators were genetically altered and so they cannot revolt against the Naturals. But Finis isn't like the other Socius Coordinators, since he hates Naturals that much. He's sometimes foul mouthed and is an expert on Long Ranged combat. He pilots the LH-GAT-X103 Hail Buster.

- Lily Thevalley [GSVSA]

Carbon Human; A member of the Special Brigade of the Librarian Works Assigned to Prayer Reverie. She's a Pure Carbon Human who's not a clone of a specific person but has skills that makes her more than a match in the battlefield against ace pilots. Because of her young age, she's somehow a bit inexperienced to pilot a Mobile suit though she received some special conditioning and training to enhance her skills. Due to her childish behavior, Lily tends to be mentally unstable inside and her personality is not fixed so it can undergo changes depending on the situation. She's the pilot of the LN-GAT-X207 Nebula Blitz and has access to its teleportation ability, something that no coordinator nor natural can do. Her character design is based on Elpeo Puru from Mobile Suit Gundam ZZ while her name is based on Lily of the Valley, a type of poisonous flower.

== Other ==
- Elisa Azana [GSA]

Head of a pirate gang and in a relationship with Kenaf Luchini; leads an attack against Lowe in order to steal his Red Frame.

- George Glenn (ジョージ・グレン, Jōji Guren) [GSA/GSDA]
- Kenaf Luchini (ケナフ・ルキーニ) [GSA/GSDA] – Voiced by: Akio Ōtsuka (Japanese)

Coordinator; freelance informant who enjoys manipulating events through careful release of information, and takes a special interest in Lowe Guele; has an unspecified relationship with pirate Elisa Asanya; pilots the prototype NMS-X07PO Gel Finieto. His name is spelled "Kenav" and "Kenov" in the TOKYOPOP translations of the Astray manga.

- Kaite Madigan [GSDA/GSVSA]

Coordinator; veteran ZAFT pilot turned mercenary; pilots multiple customized mobile suits manufactured by the Earth Alliance and ZAFT; very confident in his abilities, and always wears a business suit even in battle; employed by Matias to protect Jess Rabble; normally calm and collected, but sometimes becomes extremely violent under stress; he comes from the Combat Coordinator development organization "Circus" (where the only way to leave the organization is to win in handicapped fights); all his mobile suits have a cross on the left chest, which is the mark of people who passed the organization's test to leave; he hates Elijah Kiel since he is a pretty boy, and does not acknowledge anyone who does not work hard (even though Elijah has worked to become an ace pilot); his mobile suits are equipped with a customized beam revolver with bayonet; when training Jess in his ZGMF-1001 ZAKU Custom, it is equipped with shoulder shield that acts as shield, katar blades and gatling gun. In VS Astray, he was employed by the Librarian and pilots the LR-GAT-X102 Regen Duel.

- Reverend Malchio (マルキオ師, Marukio-shi) [GSA/GSDA] – Voiced by: Kazuya Nakai (Japanese); Brian Drummond (English)

Natural; a blind priest trusted by both the PLANTs and Earth Alliance, thus allowing him to serve as an occasional envoy between the two. He is also closely aligned to the Junk Guild and a mentor to Prayer Reverie. He runs an orphanage in the Marshall Islands and also, with Lowe Guele's aid, brings the severely injured Kira Yamato to Lacus Clyne after Kira's near fatal battle with Athrun Zala. Shortly after he returned to Earth, Athrun paid a visit. While Malchio updates Athrun about the situation with Orb, a young boy says that someday he will destroy ZAFT and kicks Athrun in the leg. Malchio apologizes to Athrun for the boy's insolence and explains that he lost his parents during the occupation of Carpentaria. Sometime between the Battle of Mendel and the Battle of Boaz, Malchio negotiates a treaty between the Junk Guild and the Three Ships Alliance, allowing the Junk Guild vessel ReHOME (aboard which is none other than Lowe) to act as the tender ship of the Three Ships Alliance. After the war, Kira and Lacus move in with Malchio and all of the orphans under his care. Two years later, Reverend Malchio remains much where he was left off at the end of the first series. When the Second Bloody Valentine War begins, he plays much the same role as he did before as well.

- Jess Rabble [GSDA] – Voiced by: Yuji Ueda (Japanese)

Natural; a freelance photojournalist and pilot of the ZGMF-X12 Astray Out Frame (along with the AI computer '8'), given to him by Lowe Guele when he was employed by Matias to report on the Genesis Alpha; also known as the "Jess of the Rabble" which is the same as his last name, since he is hot blooded and does not think much before jumping into situations; dedicated to finding and revealing the "truth" as seen by him to others; he reports the situations on the battlefield through the view of a mobile suit with the Out Frame's gun camera; frequently employed by Matias.

- Evidence 01 [GSA]

Also called the "Winged Whale", it is an extraterrestrial fossil that was found orbiting Jupiter by George Glenn, proving the existence of life beyond Earth; the discovery weakens the influence of many religions, which in turn leads to a temporary increase in tolerance for Coordinators; this is a first-ever occurrence of an alien life in the entire Gundam franchise. Lowe Guele briefly encounters what may be a live specimen of the "Winged Whale" in the Pacific Ocean.
There is some evidence that Evidence 01 is not an extraterrestrial, such as the fact that no living organism could survive in Jupiter. Jupiter's gravity is so strong compared to Earth, that hydrogen becomes fluid and can conduct electricity.

- Porsche [GSA]

A pirate who sneaks aboard the ship belonging to Lowe and his colleagues in order to recon on the status of the Red Frame.

- Shinisto (Garfield?) [GSA]

Natural; Liam Garfield's twin brother. Heads the project to transport the Space Colony Literia to Jupiter. After meeting with Liam after so many years, he tries to convince Liam to join him, but Liam declines. He is married to a coordinator and adopted a son who was orphaned due to the war.
