= Ramius =

Ramius can refer to the following fictional characters:

- Marko Ramius, a Soviet submarine captain in The Hunt for Red October, Tom Clancy's debut novel and the film adaptation
- Murrue Ramius, the captain of the Archangel of Cosmic Era Mobile Suit Gundam SEED
- Ramius, a minor Goa'uld from the fictional Stargate universe
