= Akira Sasanuma =

Japanese voice actor

- 笹沼 晃
- Born: March 25, 1973 (age 53); Japan
- Other names: 笹沼 尭羅 (Akira Sasanuma, stage name from 2009 to 2019)
- Occupation: Voice actor
- Agent: Arts Vision

Akira Sasanuma (笹沼 晃, Sasanuma Akira; born March 25, 1973) is a Japanese voice actor who is a member of Arts Vision. He voiced Austria in the Hetalia: Axis Powers series and was the voice of Link in The Legend of Zelda: Twilight Princess.

== Filmography ==
=== Anime ===
Year	Series	Role	Notes	Source
1990	Tokyo Fairy Tale 3			
1998	Love Cadet Starlight Scramble	Haruki		
1998	Legend of the Galactic Heroes			
1998	Marvelous Melmo Renewal	Shogo		
1998	All Purpose Cultural Cat Girl Nuku Nuku DASH!	Various characters		
1999	Gokudo	Oji Tsukiha		
2001	Offside (オフサイド)	Kento Sawamura, Lucio Leone		
2001	Crush Gear Turbo	Takeshi Manganji		
2001–02	Rave Master	Julius		
2002	Araiso Private School Student Council Executive	Jun Matsubara	OVA series	
2002–03	Mobile Suit Gundam SEED	Dearka Elsman, Martin DaCosta & Rusty Mackenzie		
2003	Beyblade G-Revolution	Claude		
2003	Planetes	Kurenai Ukon, Kurofuku		
2004	Battle B-Daman	Butler (Joshua)		
2004	Ragnarok the Animation	Acolyte		
2004	Monkey Turn V	Tetsuo		
2004–05	Onmyō Taisenki	Kirihito		
2004	Uta-Kata	Toru		
2004–05	Mobile Suit Gundam SEED Destiny	Dearka Elsman		
2005–07	Viewtiful Joe	Strobe		
2006	Hanbun no Tsuki ga Noboru Sora	Tamotsu Yamanishi		
2007	Nasu: A Migratory Bird with Suitcase	Nino		
2007	Strait Jacket	Isaac Hammond		
2008	Quiz Magic Academy	Francis	OVA	
2009–2021	Hetalia: Axis Powers series	Austria		
2012	The Knight in the Area	Shimatani		
2024	Mobile Suit Gundam SEED Freedom	Dearka Elsman	Film	
2024	Haigakura	Jungei		

=== Video games ===
Year	Series	Role	Notes	Source
1998	Let's Go On Tour Party Graduation Trip (ツアーパーティー 卒業旅行にいこう, Tsuāpātī sotsugyō ryokō ni ikou)	Yoichi Haruna		
1998	Personal Professor	Dragon Wataru Miyadera		
1998	Love Cadet Starlight Scramble	Haruki		
1998	Rival Schools: United by Fate	Koji Yazawa		
1998–2004	Tokyo Majin Gakuen series	Gengetsu Ryu		
1999	Little Lovers She So Game			
2004	Empire Thousand Senki	Yoshishun		
2004–present	Quiz Magic Academy series	Francis		
2004	Tales of Rebirth	Ox		
2005	Mobile Suit Gundam 0079 Card Builder	Mallet, Sanginu		
2006	Etude Prologue ~Wavering Form of Mind~	Hiroshi Sanada	PS2 version	
2006	Lamento -Beyond the Void-	Froud		
2006	The Legend of Zelda: Twilight Princess	Link		
2007	Shikaku tantei sora no sekai ~sauzan dorīmusu~ (死角探偵 空の世界 ~Thousand Dreams~)	Yukihiro		
2007	Cluster Edge	Serafi Night		
2007	Mobile Suit Gundam 0083 Card Builder	Mallet, Sanginu		
2007	Soul Nomad & the World Eaters	Gig		
2008	Super Smash Bros. Brawl	Link		
1997–98	Anime Ganbare Goemon			
2012	DRAMAtical Murder	Ryuuhou		
2013	DRAMAtical Murder re: Connect	Ryuuhou		
2014	Super Smash Bros. for Nintendo 3DS and Wii U	Link	Reused voice clips from Brawl	
2025	Genshin Impact	Rerir, Rächer of Solnari		

=== Tokusatsu ===
Year	Series	Role	Notes	Source
2007	Kamen Rider Den-O	Drill-Hand Mole Imagin	Ep. 35-36 (Voiced by Daisuke Kirii (Axe-Hand (Ep. 35), Kōichi Sakaguchi (Claw-Hand (Ep. 35–36))	
2010	Kamen Rider × Kamen Rider × Kamen Rider The Movie: Cho-Den-O Trilogy Episode Yellow	Spider Imagin (Red Eye)/S Daiki (Actor by Kimito Totani)	Movie	
2011	OOO, Den-O, All Riders: Let's Go Kamen Riders	Mole Imagin (Voiced by Kengo Takanashi, Hisafumi Oda)	Movie	
2013	Kamen Rider Wizard	other Kamen Rider (Voiced by Kengo Takanashi, Hidenori Takahashi, Daisuke Egawa, Ryo Iwasaki)	Ep. 52–53	
2019	Kamen Rider Zi-O	Axe-Hand Mole Imagin	Ep. 39–40	
