= Mobile Suit Gundam SEED Freedom =

2024 Japanese film by Mitsuo Fukuda

- Japanese poster of the movie
- Directed by: Mitsuo Fukuda
- Screenplay by: Chiaki Morosawa; Liu Goto; Mitsuo Fukuda
- Based on: Mobile Suit Gundam SEED by Hajime Yatate & Yoshiyuki Tomino
- Starring: Sōichirō Hoshi; Rie Tanaka; Akira Ishida; Nanako Mori; Kenichi Suzumura; Maaya Sakamoto
- Music by: Toshihiko Sahashi
- Production company: Sunrise
- Distributed by: Bandai Namco Filmworks; Shochiku
- Release date: January 26, 2024
- Running time: 124 minutes
- Country: Japan
- Language: Japanese
- Box office: $36 million

Mobile Suit Gundam SEED Freedom (Japanese: 機動戦士ガンダムSEED(シード) FREEDOM(フリーダム), Hepburn: Kidō Senshi Gandamu Shīdo Furīdamu) is a 2024 Japanese animated military science fiction action film produced by Sunrise and directed by Mitsuo Fukuda. The film is a sequel to Mobile Suit Gundam SEED Destiny, taking place one year after the events of SEED Destiny. The film features the talents of Sōichirō Hoshi, Rie Tanaka, Akira Ishida, Nanako Mori, Kenichi Suzumura, and Maaya Sakamoto, among others. In C.E.75, the battle was still on. Independence movements, invasion by Blue Cosmos. In order to calm down the situation, a world peace monitoring organization, Compass, is established with Lacus Clyne as the first president. Soldiers involving Kira Yamato and his friends join the Compass and intervene in battles in various places as members. At that time, the Emerging Countries Foundation proposed a joint operation with Compass against Blue Cosmos headquarters in Eurasia.

The film had been in development since 2006, but production was postponed due to main writer Chiaki Morosawa's health condition. A few years after Morosawa's death in 2016, the film's production started, and it was released on January 26, 2024. Director Mitsuo Fukuda expressed hardships in animating the mobile suits and battle ships due to the usage of CGI and the large amount of mechas the cast uses. In regards to the characters, Fukuda had several ideas in regards to expand Kira's story alongside the supporting characters Shinn Asuka and Athrun Zala with the first being the least prominent in Destiny and the ending of the Destiny storyline gave new sides of each character to be explored. Besides English screenings, the film also made it to Western regions through Netflix. An expanded version titled Special Edition was also released.

The film grossed over US$36 million, becoming the highest-grossing film in the Gundam franchise. Critical response to the movie has been positive due to the focus on the love stories featured, most notably Kira and Lacus'. While the animation, music and fight sequences have also been praised, the fanservice provided in the film was criticized. A prequel, titled Mobile Suit Gundam SEED Freedom Zero, is currently in production.

== Plot ==
In May C.E.75, one year after the end of the Second Alliance-PLANT War, (Note: As depicted in Mobile Suit Gundam SEED Destiny) remnants of the anti-Coordinator terrorist group, Blue Cosmos, continue to lead several attacks on Earth, including PLANT-Aligned territories. A world peace monitoring organization, Compass, under Orb Chief Representative Cagalli Yula Athha, former PLANT Supreme Council Chairwoman Lacus Clyne, and President of the Atlantic Federation Foster, was formed to promote peace on Earth and PLANTs. The latter serves as its president. The organization's supreme commander, Kira Yamato, leads his team, consisting of Shinn Asuka, Lunamaria Hawke, and Agnes Giebenrath from the LHM-BB03S Millennium, to destroy the remnants on Afrika. At a meeting in the PLANTs, Lacus openly admits her hope to end the conflict swiftly and wishes to free Kira from it. On Earth, the government of the breakaway Kingdom of Foundation in Eurasia proposes a joint operation with Compass against Blue Cosmos. Lacus confides in Kira, and both agree to meet with the government to accept the operation.

The Millennium descends to Earth, accompanied by the battleship, LCAM-01XA Archangel, commanded by Murrue Ramius, and arrives in the kingdom. The government's Prime Minister, Orphee Lam Tao, and Queen Aura Maha Khyber, the leader of Foundation, meet the group. The members of Compass also meet the Black Knights, Foundation's mobile suit squad, but the team rebuffs them, showing off its superiority complex, earning disgusted looks from the group. On the Millennium, Agnes openly flirts with Kira, which Lacus overhears and runs away. Kira attempts to find her but is confronted by Orphee, who affirms that he is a more suitable partner to Lacus than Kira himself.

During the operation, Foundation turns on Compass and the Earth Alliance, with Orphee getting the Black Knights to draw Kira away. Kira's mind is telepathically overtaken by the Black Knights, who lead him to locate and pursue the Blue Cosmos leader, Michael. He crosses the demarcation line into Eurasia's territory unknowingly and, since Compass could only operate in the Eldore region, is attacked in retaliation. Branded as a traitor, Kira is overwhelmed by the Knights. Agnes betrays Compass and assists the Knights in defeating Kira. The Knights launch nuclear missiles from a hijacked Eurasia military outpost to destroy the kingdom and the government headquarters to frame Eurasia. The Archangel is ambushed and destroyed by the Knights, with Shinn also being defeated, but is rescued by Hilda. Thanks to the help of Athrun Zala, Meyrin Hawke, and Mu La Flaga, several crewmembers of the Archangel manage to survive the battle; however, Eldore and Foundation's capital, Ishtaria, are destroyed by the nukes, and Foundation leaders take Lacus to their base in space.

In the aftermath, Cagalli attempts to mediate between the PLANTs and the Earth Alliance but fails; both sides cut ties with Compass, and its activities are suspended. Athrun holds a meeting to reveal Foundation's true objective: to use Lacus and implement a variation of Gilbert Durandal's Destiny Plan, along with revealing the origins of Aura, Orphee, and Lacus, who are part of a new race of enhanced coordinators called the Accords, with Orphee and Lacus genetically designed to be their leaders and rule mankind together. Foundation reveals the repaired Requiem, destroys Eurasia's capital, Moscow, in revenge for the nuclear attack, and gives an ultimatum to the entire world and PLANTs: accept the Destiny Plan and their leadership within five days, or be destroyed. Kira breaks down, but Athrun convinces him to rejoin the fight, which he accepts. Compass then receives from Orb new versions of Destiny, Strike Freedom, and Impulse, and heads into space with the Millennium.

Meanwhile, Orphee attempts to seduce Lacus, but she rejects his advances and repeatedly tells him that he is not the person she chooses to love. Thinking she means Kira, Orphee becomes furious and continues holding her hostage. A coup d'état occurs within ZAFT in support of Foundation, and a fleet is sent to protect Requiem. ZAFT members Yzak Joule and Dearka Elsman escape the coup and join the FFMH-Y101 Eternal to stop the rogue faction after evacuating the leader of the PLANT supreme council. An assault team led by Kira infiltrates Foundation's base on the Artemis asteroid and rescues Lacus, as Mu damages and disables the Requiem by reflecting its blast. From the Millennium's bridge, Lacus broadcasts a message, revealing the Foundation's true motives and condemning their actions.

Orb dispatches the Kusanagi to join forces with Millennium and Eternal, and heads into battle against Foundation. Orphee sorties with Ingrid in his mobile suit, overwhelming Kira along with Shura, but Athrun saves him and engages the latter with the new version of his Infinite Justice. Yzak, Dearka, the Eternal, and the Kusanagi suppress the rogue ZAFT fleet as Murrue leads the Millennium in destroying Aura's flagship. Lacus arrives and assists Kira in destroying all of the Foundation's mobile suits and ships in the newly-formed ZGMF/A-262PD-P Mighty Strike Freedom Gundam, piloted by both Kira and Lacus. Shinn and Hilda defeat the Black Knights, and Lunamaria disables Agnes. Athrun defeats Shura with Cagalli's help, and Shinn destroys the repaired Requiem, with support from Lunamaria and Athrun, moments before it could fire at Orb. Convinced by Lacus and Kira's beliefs about world peace and true love, Orphee and Ingrid accept their defeat, and the war ends. Lacus and Kira descend to Earth on a beach, where they share a kiss.

== Cast ==
| Characters | Japanese | English |
|---|---|---|
| Kira Yamato | Sōichirō Hoshi | Max Mittelman |
| Lacus Clyne | Rie Tanaka | Stephanie Sheh |
| Athrun Zala | Akira Ishida | Chris Hackney |
| Cagalli Yula Athha | Nanako Mori (Note: Replacing Naomi Shindō) | Cherami Leigh |
| Shinn Asuka | Kenichi Suzumura | Kieran Regan (Note: Replacing Aaron Phillips who his inactivity in dubbing as of 2023) |
| Lunamaria Hawke | Maaya Sakamoto | Alyson Leigh Rosenfeld |
| Meyrin Hawke | Fumiko Orikasa | Christine Marie Cabanos |
| Murrue Ramius | Kotono Mitsuishi | Carrie Keranen |
| Ezalia Joule | Kotono Mitsuishi | Caitlyn Elizabeth (Note: Replacing Cindy Robinson) |
| Mu La Flaga | Takehito Koyasu | Trevor Devall (Note: Replacing Tom Wayland from the Ocean Productions dub) |
| Yzak Joule | Tomokazu Seki | Daman Mills |
| Dearka Elsman | Akira Sasanuma | Johnny Yong Bosch |
| Agnes Giebenrath | Houko Kuwashima | Kelly Baskin |
| Stella Loussier | Houko Kuwashima | Francesca Calo |
| Toyah Mashima | Ayane Sakura | Jonathan Leon |
| Alexei Konoe | Hōchū Ōtsuka | Sean Burgos |
| Albert Heinlein | Jun Fukuyama | Ben Balmaceda |
| Hilda Haken | Michiko Neya | Marin Miller |
| Herbert von Reinhard | Taiten Kusunoki | Bea Billany |
| Mars Simeon | Junichi Suwabe | Bill Butts |
| Liu Shenqiang | Kentaro Tone | Blythe Melin |
| Daniel Harper | Yoshitsugu Matsuoka | Howard Wang |
| Griffin Arbalest | Win Morisaki | A.J. Beckles |
| Orphee Lam Tao | Hiro Shimono | Alejandro Saab |
| Aura Maha Khyber | Yukari Tamura | Lizzie Freeman |
| Ingrid Tradoll | Sumire Uesaka | AmaLee |
| Redelard Tradoll | Misato Fukuen | Courtney Lin |
| Shura Serpentine | Yuichi Nakamura | Zeno Robinson |
| Arnold Neumann | Isshin Chiba | Bill Butts (Note: Replacing Ben Pronsky) |
| Ledonir Kisaka | Isshin Chiba | TBA |
| Dalida Lolaha Chandra II | Katsumi Toriumi | Christian La Monte |
| Lio Mao | Yuna Kamakura | Courtney Lin |
| Arthur Trine | Hiroki Takahashi | Robbie Daymond |
| Abbey Windsor | Haruka Tomatsu (Note: Replacing Michiko Neya) | Olivia Hack |
| Erica Simmons | Michiyo Yanagisawa | Erica Schroeder |
| Miriallia Haw | Megumi Toyoguchi | Cassandra Morris |
| Walter de Lament | Shinshu Fuji | Bob Johnson |
| Hari Jagannath | Hiroya Egashira | Frank Todaro |
| Foster | Yurika Hino | Caitlyn Elizabeth |
| Gilbert Durandal | Shuichi Ikeda | Keith Silverstein |

== Production ==
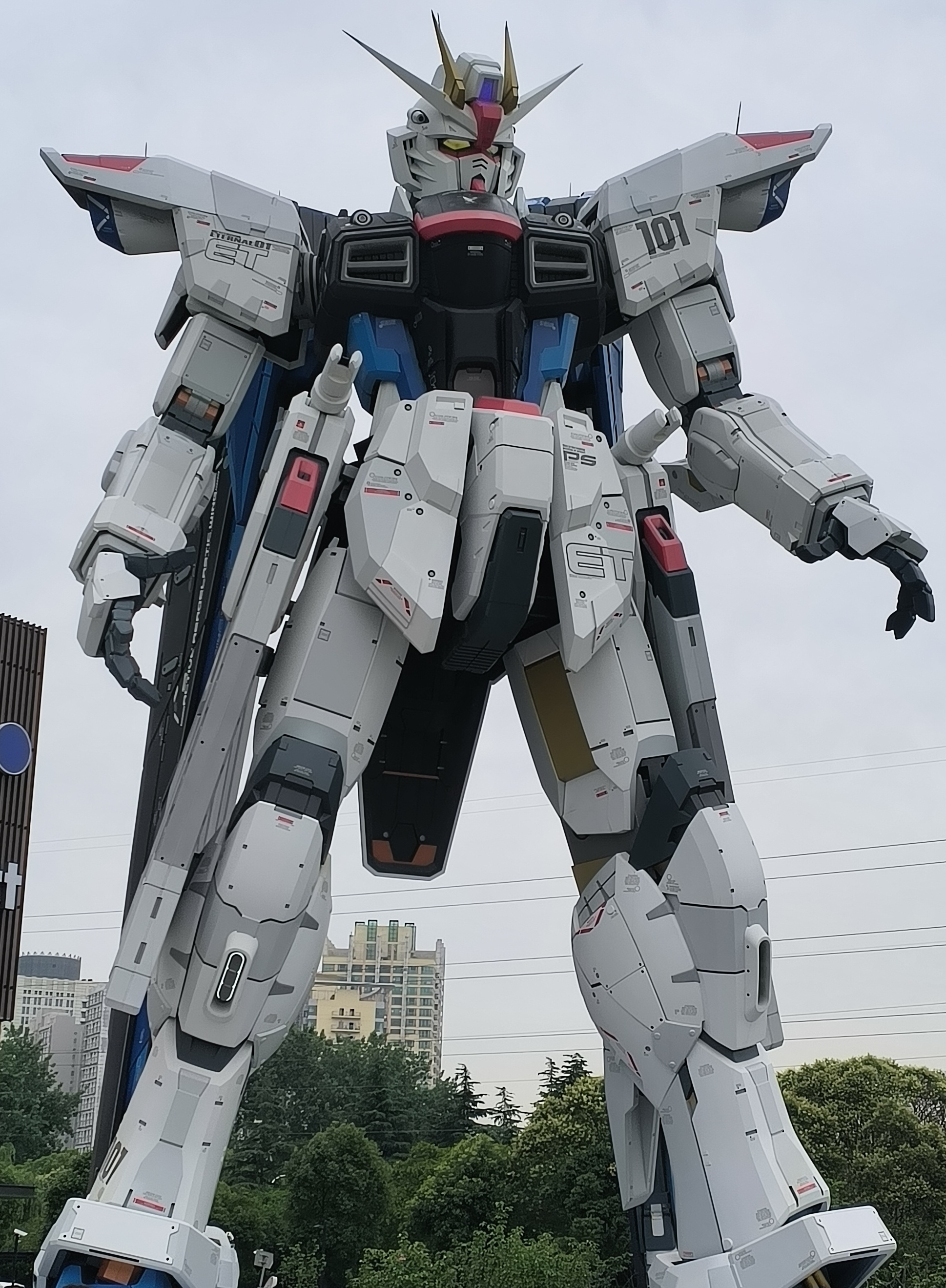
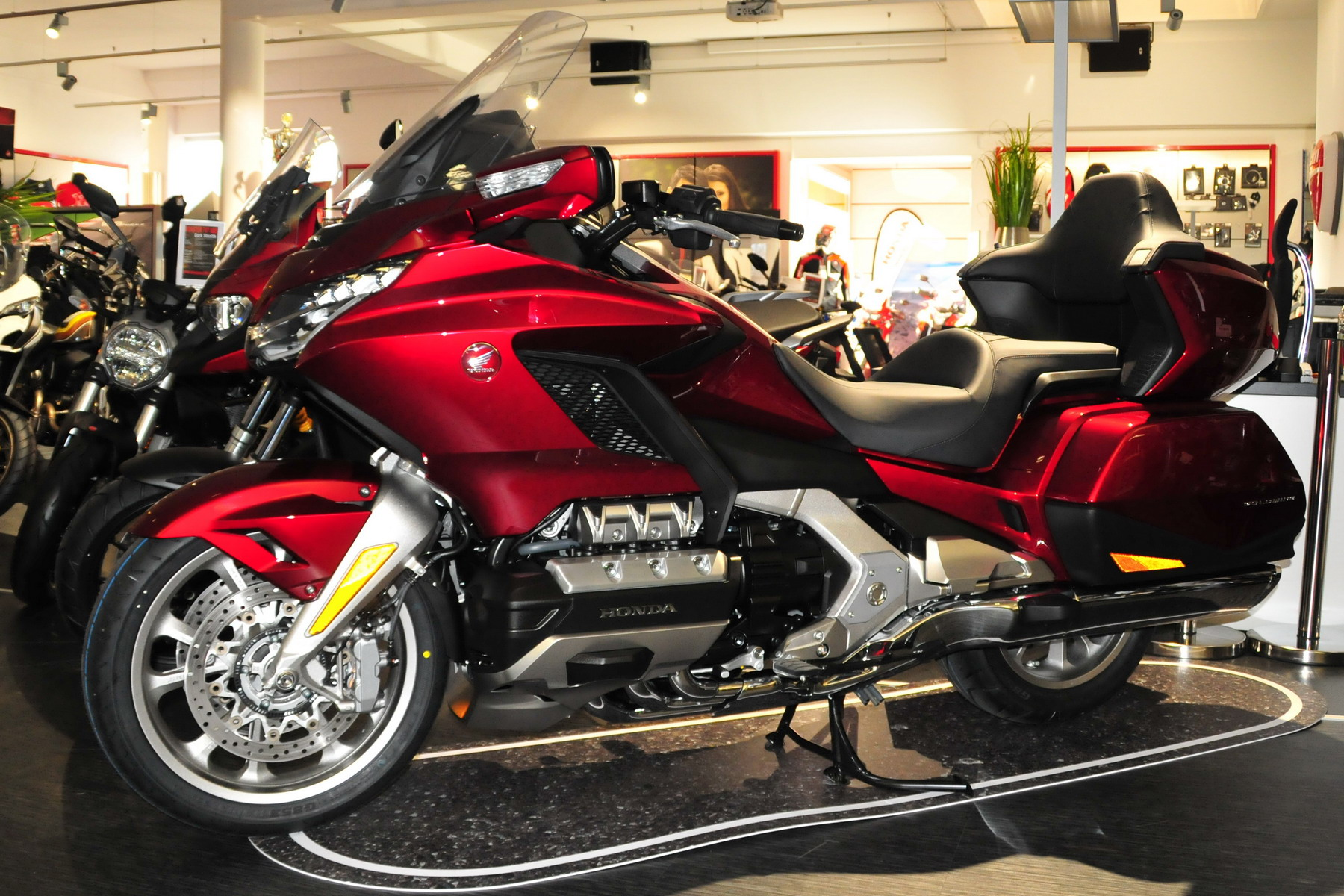
In promoting the movie, a statue of the Freedom Gundam from Kira Yamato was made while examples of Honda Gold Wing as references to Kira and Lacus' hobbies they share.

Sunrise announced the film at the Sony Music Anime Fes' 06. It would have been the first original Gundam film since 1991. After the Sony Music Anime Fes' 06, Sunrise announced the film on their website. Houko Kuwashima, the voice actress of character Stella Loussier, has stated on her "SEED Club blog" that the character will somehow also have a role in the film. Lacus, Yzak Joule, and Dearka Elsman will return as members of the PLANT Supreme Council, and Kira, Shinn, and Lunamaria Hawke will be part of the ZAFT military. However, in 2008, writer Chiaki Morosawa explained that the plot was done, but she has been ill since the end of 2004-2005's Mobile Suit Gundam SEED Destiny series. As a result, she asked for the fans' patience. In 2016, it was announced Morosawa died due to aortic dissection. Takanori Nishikawa mentioned at the Gundam 40th Fes. “Live Beyond” concert in 2019 that he was told by a staff member that the film was still in pre-production.

The Bandai Namco Group announced the "Mobile Suit Gundam Seed Project ignited" initiative during the opening ceremony for the life-size Freedom Gundam statue in Shanghai in May 2021. Headlining the initiative is the previously announced film project that serves as a sequel to the television series Destiny. The official website for the film project opened on July 2, 2023, and revealed the film's title and teaser.

A two-volume novel adaptation of the movie by Liu Goto was released in Japan. Both volumes of the movie adaptation had a large reprint. Illustrations are by Tomofumi Ogasawara. Work on the novelization started in 2019. Goto reviewed the plot Morosawa left behind. Aside from that, the novel was a foray into screenplay writing, which he was not familiar with, but he was able to pull through with the "guidance of the director and producers." The feedback apparently ran both ways. Goto does mention that when he was writing for the SEED television series, he found inspiration in foreign dramas he admired, especially those made by sci-fi authors.

=== Animation ===
Fukuda said the development team for the movie is composed of several returning staff members as well as new ones, aiming to create new technology together. Despite the pressure of the success of the two SEED series, the director looks forward to creating a product that is able to match its predecessors. Fukuda apologized to the fans for the long development hell the film took, as it was originally meant to come shortly after Destiny. He reflected on the unfinished drama left by the protagonists of Kira Yamato, Athrun Zala, and Shinn Asuka and thus wanted to explore such possibilities with Freedom. With the long development, Fukuda also looked forward to using more 3D and facial expressions.

As in previous works, the mecha were created by Kunio Okawara, with the mechanical animation director being Satoshi Shigeta and Fujita Shinmu at the 3DCG production desk. Looking back, Fujita found the two new Rising Freedom Gundam and Immortal Justice Gundam together challenging in the first place. He remade the Immortal Justice several times. At the beginning of production, it was planned that the MS used to create the CG model would only be used for the first half of the movie where the Archangel sinks but as the production of cuts and models progressed, director Fukuda's confidence in CG increased, and even more so for the second half. It was decided that many CG models would be created. Including mobile suits with "breaks," nearly 60 were created. Regarding Zaku Phantom, Fujita only has blaze equipment, but for fun, he added gunner equipment as well. However, it did not really show up. Regarding Akatsuki, At first, it was planned that everything would be drawn, and the CG of the Zeus silhouette would follow the drawn Akatsuki. However, three to four weeks before delivery, the staff feared time limitations and hurriedly created a model for Akatsuki. Archangel took just over a year. Millennium took 1 year and 8 months.

Among the many effects, they put particular effort into the wings of Destiny Gundam, Strike Freedom Gundam, and water landing. Director Fukuda was very particular about the visuals, and Fujita worked on the production passionately. Gouf was halfway through making the CG model. Destiny Impulse Gundam was also scheduled to appear, but the director pointed out that "it would overlap with Destiny," so Impulse was further improved into Impulse Gundam Spec II. M1 Astray was also planned to be made with CG, but it was canceled because there would be no homeland defense this time.

When it comes to special effects, Fukuda cited Top Gun and the Star Wars series as influences. In particular, for cuts that required expressiveness, such as highlights in the play, the CG image was printed frame by frame on paper, and Shigeta directly corrected it before recreating the CG, and so on. A major animation scene that was remade several times was the transformation sequence of Rising Freedom, as the director wanted it to have its own unique feel when compared with previous incarnations of Kira's mecha. Shigeta cited a transformation scene from Mobile Suit Zeta Gundam, with Fujita expressing relief in retrospect as they could use several colors. The launch of the Destiny Gundam Spec II and the shooting down of the battleship were the result of several visual effects created by the staff together. Fukuda also mentioned he watched recent works as well, e.g., the beam cloak design of Black Knight Squad Dora was a reference to the character design of Tokai Teio in Uma Musume Pretty Derby.

=== Cast ===
In contrast to Destiny, where most of the plot focused around Athrun Zala, Fukuda decided that the protagonist of the film would be Kira, leading to the new subtitle Freedom, which serves as one of the main themes of the trilogy and contrasts with Gilbert Durandal's Destiny Plan used in the climax of the previous series. Fukuda finds it challenging to pinpoint what exactly those origins are, but over the course of a year, he has been mulling over how to create a piece that resonates with what they achieved with SEED and Destiny. In that sense, it was a return to their roots in terms of evoking those elements. Finding the concept of staying true to the routes of SEED gave the director major pressure. The CG team is striving to emulate Satoshi Shigeta's artwork. He has also had major inspirations for the handling of Shinn and whether or not the audience will be captivated by him. He felt that the voice actors, Kenichi Suzumura and Akira Ishida, among others, expanded their ranges, improving the characters.

Regarding the character he played at the time, Hoshi said he had just played the grown-up Kira in the movie version, so it felt strange. Kira's growth from repeating Destiny to his visionary appearance in the end was appealing, he said, looking back on Kira's growth. Hoshi said there may be people who have been waiting for a long time, and there are people who have recently learned about SEED and have already arrived at the movie version, but they were also able to finally complete the dubbing. Hoshi was excited that the movie version was finally nearing completion. Hoshi said he had done a lot of lines from SEED and DESTINY so far, but was really happy to see Kira's new lines set two years later. The actor looks forward to seeing what kind of great lines will come out. Fukuda recounts that his wife, late writer Chiaki Morosawa, wanted to do two things in the movie: have a character, more specifically Athrun, punch Kira due to a lack of violence outside mobile suit fights, as well as sink the Archangel. Morowasa did not believe that the story could end properly until the Archangel sank. For the movie, Hoshi played Kira, who is now obsessed with fighting. Across the twenty years he has been voicing the character, he finds him relatable. Meanwhile, Tanaka described Lacus "as at first coming across as floaty, untouchable, and unreadable." For the movie, she decided to compare her with the character of Meer Campbell, as both strive to be perfect. Hoshi was nervous in regards to whether or not the movie would be canceled until the official announcement, as he was glad he would voice Kira again. Tanaka teased an emotional, happy ending that would make the audience cry. Tanaka also expressed a desire to make the movie enjoyable to watch.

On the other hand, Suzumura described his character as cheerful. The director spoke with him before recording, explaining that although Shin is inherently a bright person, the story's scenes suppress that aspect, preventing him from expressing it. Suzumura discussed how destiny reflects the state of things. Reflecting on Shinn's transformation from cheerfulness to seriousness when he became involved in the war, the actor believes Shinn was brave and doing his best. Furthermore, when recording with Takehito Koyasu, who plays Mu La Flaga, Suzumura said, "Even though I'm a senior, I was really happy when a certain Mr. Koyasu complimented me." Among the newcomers, Win Morisaki was excited to be selected to voice a character because of his love for Gundam. Fukuda mentioned that while Destiny portrays Shinn negatively, he is much more lighthearted in the movie, returning to his original kind persona due to his good relationship with Kira. Shinn's former enemy has now become his friendly superior while working at Compass. Meanwhile, Fukuda noted that although Kira often appears as a "mess," his personality is also kind, similar to the current Shinn.

Real Sound said that the novelization of the movie felt to further explore Kira's pain and kindess as he becomes more involved in the war on his own. Kira's thoughts are clearly depicted in the novel, and we can see that although he may seem indecisive, he is a man with strong convictions. When Kira becomes brainwashed by the Compass and starts acting against the law, Lacus ironically is the one who others the forces to stop him. The second novel helps to add far more peaceful scenes between Kira and Lacus as a sign of relief to the fans. The second novelization was praised for Lacus joining up with Kira's Mighty Strike Freedom more explained than in the movie. The couple is able to pilot the mobile suit together to defeat the leaders of the Compass. Other characters explored in the novels are Athrun and Cagalli whose romance share a parallel to Kira and Lacus' due to the difficulties they share but were not explored in the film.

=== Songs ===
The main theme song of the film is "Freedom" performed by Nishikawa and Tetsuya Komuro. Komuro was pleased to be working with Nishikawa for the first time, especially since he had not done music for a Gundam series since Mobile Suit Gundam: Char's Counterattack. The single release of the song was on January 24, 2024. The ending theme song is "Sarigiwa no Romantics" (去り際のロマンティクス; lit. "Romantics Upon Parting") by See-Saw. In addition to using an original illustration drawn by the anime on the jacket, the first production comes in a premium package. Fukuda expressed pleasure when working with See-Saw again, as in Seed and Seed Destiny saying the new song has an emotionally moving melody line, a world-building arrangement, and words that connect the characters' feelings. Chiaki Ishikawa had contacted Fukuda when she was chosen to make the ending song, which gave her confidence since the director informed her about the cast's feelings and how she would be able to create a theme. Yuki Kajiura wrote the lyrics.

=== Marketing ===
Promotions included a collaboration with Dune: Part Two in the form of an alternate version of Dune: Part Two's movie poster featuring Lacus and Kira in place of Chani (Zendaya) and Paul Atreides (Timothée Chalamet), respectively. Additionally, inside the Honda booth, the motorcycles "Gold Wing" and "Hawk 11" were on display at the Honda booth at the 2024 Motorcycle Show. Regarding the reason for choosing a motorcycle as the vehicle for the two of them rather than a four-wheeled car, director Fukuda said that cars feel like they move on a single axis or in a flat manner, but motorcycles also have roll movements, so it's more free-flowing. This fits Kira and Lacus, as it symbolizes the freedom that they crave. Fukuda was inspired by his own youth to animate bikes, as he relates them to superheroes like Bari Bari Densetsu. Due to economic reasons, Fukuda could not buy cars, so he saved money for bikes. Though not major in the movie, the bikes Kira and Lacus ride together were hard to animate, but Fukuda still personally drew scenes. In regards to how they work, the gold wing that Kira is riding is a reciprocating engine. Other collaborations involve Sanrio and Alpha Industries. Other events primarily focused on Kira's and Cagalli's characters were made. A special concert was made for T.M Revolution.

== Reception ==
=== Release ===
Following three days of its release, Gundam SEED Freedom sold 630,000 tickets and earned 1.06 billion yen (about US$7.20 million), the highest three-day opening ever for a Gundam movie. By the second week, it became the highest-grossing Gundam film ever, surpassing Mobile Suit Gundam III: Encounters in Space in the process with 2.68 billion yen (about US$17.94 million). The film earned a cumulative total of 4,796,455,740 yen (about US$30.65 million) as of May 21. In its final weekend, the movie earned 138,059,550 yen (about US$882,300). Real Sound noted that Freedom was not only the highest grossing film of the franchise but also Shochiku's second highest grossing Japanese movie ever, behind Departures (2008). Director Mitsuo Fukuda said he was satisfied with these news.

In Australia and New Zealand, it was released in cinemas by Sugoi Co on March 14 with a special fan premiere event being held in both Sydney and Melbourne on March 11. A re-release through Sugoi Co was held at Hoyts Broadway as part of the GUNDAM BASE Pop-Up World Tour on October 2, 2025 alongside re-releases of Mobile Suit Gundam GQuuuuuuX -The Beginning- and a special 4K remaster release of Gundam Wing: Endless Waltz.

In the United Kingdom, an initial two-day 23–24 March release was extended until 3 April. In North America and Canada, the film was screened on May 7-8. In the Philippines, the film was screen in the Odex Film Festival from July 10 to July 16.

The film and TV series Mobile Suit Gundam: The Witch From Mercury were noted to make the Gundam franchise reach record sales of 145.7 billion yen (about US$934.78 million) in the 2024 fiscal year. On Netflix, Gundam SEED Freedom became one of the most watched films.

Two special editions of the film, both with over 500 cuts of updated footage, and with different epilogue cuts added, played in Japanese theaters from September 20 to October 3, and from November 1 to 14, respectively. The special editions raised the film gross to 5,301,101,120 yen (about US$34 million).

The DVD and Blu-ray of the movie were released on December 25, 2024.

=== Critical response ===
Critical response to the movie has been positive. Several critics have enjoyed the handling of Kira Yamato and Lacus Clyne's romantic relationship. Anime News Network scored it a "B+" overall, praising the handling of Kira Yamato and Lacus Clyne's characterizations. UK Anime Network gave it a 9 out of 10, finding most of the story involving Kira and Lacus' forces against the Black Knight to have been well executed and that Shinn Asuka's characterization was changed for the better as the critic did not find him appealing in Gundam SEED Destiny. Film Ink praised the focus on romantic relationships despite being primarily a mecha series to the point of addressing what is ideal love and how it reflects the relationship of both the director Fukuda and his late wife, the writer Morosawa. While addressing the fact that the film was primarily made for fans, the reviewer still found it enjoyable from a casual's perspective. Jonathan Lack praised the narrative for focusing on the couple of Kira and Lacus, who appear to be portrayed more seriously and humanly than in Destiny, as their romantic relationship is properly explored in a similar fashion to Fukuda and Morosawa's relationship. In particular, Manga News preferred how more flawed Sunrise made Kira in Freedom than in Destiny where he came across as almost a messiah figure with his strength which bothered several viewers from such TV series while the antagonistic Shinn instead comes across as more cheerful than in his original series. Manga News also praised how the film addresses alternative interpretations from previous television series such as the dilemma of Gilbert Durandal's Destiny Plan of a dystopia controlled with might from the previous TV series which the new antagonists treasure and Kira clashes with it. This helped to give further depths to the themes of "freedom" and "destiny" Fukuda's works involve. In retrospect, Dengeki Online enjoyed the handling of Shinn as while he was shocked when seeing him lose his final duel in Destiny, Freedom gives me a more heroic portrayal that appealed to his nostalgia of the TV series even if he has mixed feelings of the character piloting the Immortal Justice.

AnimeSuperHero regarded as a love story between Kira and Lacus which also features other subplots that provide further depth to the story that make the hatred the franchise has in Western regions feel undeserved. TVLain that while he did not like the stories centered around the meaning of love, the relationship involving Kira and Lacus was surprisingly well written regardless of how chaotic it becomes in the first half when Lacus is forced to order the death of her brainwashed lover with Compass. However, the reviewers criticized the fan service for coming across as divisive and not fitting previous television series. UK Anime Network cited the amount of fanservice and sexual assault as the only negatives he found as he found most of the story. In a bigger review, the writer kept praising the pacing for never giving the audience a dull moment. However, he cited Lacus' design and piloting the Freedom alongside Kira might come across as having too much sexualization. This was based on the former's design and erotic atmosphere the two pilots have together to the point of comparing them to the cast from mecha anime Darling in the Franxx which had a similar tone in general.

While praising the animation for the handling of fight scenes, the writer still felt there were issues with the handling of character designs that might make the previous remasters of Seed and Destiny look more polished. Scifiction praised the depth provided by characters like Kira and Athrun as well as the fight scenes which would appeal to any Gundam fan. Manga News referred to the film as a "visual magnum opus" thanks to its 3D animation and refined CGI which makes it large amount of fight scenes hard to find problems. The same site praised the music employed especially the themes from Toshihiko Sahashi who previously worked in the soundtrack from the two TV series. Dengeki in particular enjoyed the Mighty Strike Freedom during the climax thanks to its "cool" apeal. The handling of fight scenes and CGI animation was also a subject positive response by the critic. TVLain felt that viewers should watch the movie in cinemas rather than streaming due to the impressive quality of the animation that would appeal to any mecha fan. The music and animation were also found to be a well put in the movie by the critic from UK Anime News Network such as the ones by T.M Revolution and See Saw. Anime News Network acknowledged the animation, especially when mobile suits fight and the new detail to the cast's design as Sunrise emphasizes that most major character are young adults. He also praised the music for being both nostalgic and innovative thanks to the usage of both remixed old themes and new themes from known artists. According to UK Anime Network, the music and animation were also found to be a well put in the movie.

=== Awards ===
Gundam SEED Freedom was a nominee for the 48th annual Japan Academy Film Prizes, losing to Lock Back in the "Best Animated Film" category. However, at the 19th Seiyu Awards, the film won "Synergy Award" with Sōichirō Hoshi being awarded for his role as Kira. At the 14th Newtype Anime Awards, the film won "Best Picture (Film)" and "Best Mechanical/Prop Design". It also won the Japan Academy Film Prize for Animation of the Year 2025 in the "Excellent Animation of the Year" category.

=== Future ===
A prequel titled Mobile Suit Gundam SEED Freedom Zero (機動戦士ガンダムSEED(シード) FREEDOM ZERO(フリーダムゼロ), Kidō Senshi Gandamu Shīdo Furīdamu Zero) was announced in November 2024 by Sunrise. Fukuda said that the scenario for this installment was written 20 years ago while the storyboards were half complete at that time. It was originally meant to be released as an original video animation but the staff was not sure how to present it. The first teaser was revealed the same month.

== Notes ==
| Preceded by Gundam Build Metaverse | Gundam metaseries (production order); 2024 | Succeeded by Mobile Suit Gundam: Requiem for Vengeance |
| Preceded by Mobile Suit Gundam SEED C.E. 73: Stargazer, Mobile Suit Gundam SEED Destiny | Gundam Cosmic Era timeline C.E. 75 | Succeeded by N / A |
