= List of Mobile Suit Gundam SEED characters =

This is a list of fictional characters featured in the Cosmic Era (CE) timeline of the Gundam anime metaseries. These characters appear in the Mobile Suit Gundam SEED and Mobile Suit Gundam SEED Destiny anime television series, the sequel film Mobile Suit Gundam SEED Freedom, and in the manga and OVA spinoffs. Both series focus on the raging conflict between Naturals and Coordinators, the former being regular humans and the latter being genetically-enhanced ones.

Mobile Suit Gundam SEED begins when the neutral space colony Heliopolis is attacked by ZAFT, a military organization composed of Coordinators. Coordinator Kira Yamato pilots the mobile suit GAT-X105 Strike to protect his friends on the Naturals' ship Archangel from potential enemies as they head towards Earth. Mobile Suit Gundam SEED Destiny continues two years after Mobile Suit Gundam SEED and follows the teenager Shinn Asuka and his duties in ZAFT.

== Protagonists ==
=== Kira Yamato ===
Kira Yamato (キラ・ヤマト) is a first-generation Coordinator, who lives on the neutral space colony Heliopolis to avoid war between the races of Coordinators and the Naturals, but such area ends involved in the war. Born as a Coordinator, Kira is the only person able to pilot the Strike mobile suit created by the Naturals, and is forced to pilot it into numerous battles to protect his friends. In Gundam Seed, Kira uses the GAT-X105 Strike Gundam until it was severely damage and would later gain the ZGMF-X10A Freedom Gundam and the ZGMF-X20A Strike Freedom Gundam in Gundam Seed Destiny. He also pilots the STSS-909 Rising Freedom in Gundam Seed Freedom until it was destroyed during the battle with the Black Knights and would later pilot a rebuild version of the Strike Freedom, the ZGMF/A-262B Strike Freedom Type II, which receives a further upgrade in the climax of the film with a new backpack, the MDE262S Proud Defender, to become the ZGMF/A-262PD-P Mighty Strike Freedom. He is voiced in the Japanese series by Sōichirō Hoshi. In English, he is voiced by Matt Hill in the Ocean dub and by Max Mittelman in the NYAV dub.

=== Athrun Zala ===
Athrun Zala (アスラン・ザラ, Asuran Zara) is a member of the military organization, ZAFT. Participating in the war between the Coordinators and the Naturals, Athrun discovers that his childhood friend, Kira Yamato became a member of the Naturals' military organization, the Earth Alliance, despite being a Coordinator. Across the series, Athrun encounters Kira various times and after almost killing him, Athrun starts questioning his own motives to participate in the war. In Gundam Seed, Athrun would use the GAT-X303 Aegis Gundam until Athrun self-destructed the Aegis while grappling the Strike, destroying both units. He would later gain the ZGMF-X09A Justice Gundam and use the mobile suit for the rest of the series until it was destroyed inside GENESIS by activating the self destruct. In Gundam Seed Destiny, Athrun used ZGMF-X23S Saviour Gundam until it was destroyed by the Freedom in a battle. Athrun would later use the ZGMF-X19A ∞ Justice Gundam for the rest of the series. He is voiced in Japanese by Akira Ishida. In English, he is voiced by Sam Vincent in the Ocean dub and by Chris Hackney in the NYAV dub.

=== Lacus Clyne ===
Lacus Clyne (ラクス・クライン, Rakusu Kurain) is a good natured and popular female vocalist from the space colony PLANT. She is the daughter of PLANT Supreme Council Chairman, Siegel Clyne. Born as a Coordinator, Lacus is introduced when she is found in space by the Archangel, a ship of Naturals and befriends the Coordinator Kira Yamato. Late in the war between the races of Coordinators and Naturals, Lacus becomes the co-leader of the Clyne Faction, stealing the Freedom Gundam to give to Kira Yamato, and then later stealing the space battleship Eternal and joining with the battleship Archangel to stop both sides from fighting. Lacus is voiced in the Japanese series by Rie Tanaka. In the Ocean English dub, Chantal Strand is her regular voice actress, while Jillian Michaels does her singing voice. In the NYAV dub, she is voiced by Stephanie Sheh.

=== Cagalli Yula Athha ===
Cagalli Yula Athha (カガリ・ユラ・アスハ, Kagari Yura Asuha) is one of the Naturals, fighting against the Coordinators in an ongoing war. Despite fighting on the battlefield various times alongside the Naturals' military organization the Earth Alliance, Cagalli is later revealed to be daughter of the leader from the neutral country of Orb. After helping her new allies to stop the war, Cagalli becomes the leader of Orb, a role mainly explored in the series' sequel, Mobile Suit Gundam SEED Destiny. During the series, Cagalli is later revealed to be Kira Yamato's sister. In Gundam Seed and Gundam Seed Destiny Cagalli uses the MBF-02 Strike Rouge, though she later pilots the ORB-01 Akatsuki once in the latter series. Cagalli is voiced by Naomi Shindō (2002-2005) and Nanako Mori (2024) in Japanese. In English, she is voiced by Vanessa Morley in the Ocean dub and by Cherami Leigh in the NYAV dub.

=== Shinn Asuka ===
Shinn Asuka (シン・アスカ, Shin Asuka) is the anti-hero in Gundam Seed Destiny. He is a member from the military organization ZAFT who joined them after his family was killed during a previous war between ZAFT and the Earth Alliance, and bears an enormous hatred towards his home country Orb for not protecting them. Across the series, Shinn starts questioning his motives to fight for ZAFT, but is still determined to follow their orders. In Gundam Seed Destiny, Shinn used the ZGMF-X56S Impulse Gundam and would later use the ZGMF-X42S Destiny Gundam. He is voiced in the Japanese series by Kenichi Suzumura. In English, he was voiced by Matthew Erickson in the Ocean dub and by Aaron Phillips in the NYAV dub.

=== Lunamaria Hawke ===
Lunamaria Hawke (ルナマリア・ホーク, Runamaria Hōku) is a mobile suit pilot for the ZAFT military forces. She attended ZAFT military academy together with her sister Meyrin Hawke and fellow pilots Shinn Asuka and Rey Za Burrel. She typically pilots a red ZGMF-1000 ZAKU Warrior but is given Shinn's mobile suit, Impulse, after he receives Destiny. Initially, she is attracted to Athrun Zala, but after Athrun and Meyrin's apparent death, she begins a relationship with Shinn. Lunamaria starts having doubts about fighting against the Archangel when learning that Meyrin is alive, but with the Archangel crew. After ZAFT's defeat, she reunites with her sister. In the 27th Anime Grand Prix she was voted 5th place in the Favorite Female category however in the 28th one she dropped to 11th place. Lunamaria came in 4th in the 56th Gundam National Census asking fans what character from the series would they want to see in swimming suit. She is voiced by Maaya Sakamoto in Japanese. In English, she is voiced by Maryke Hendrikse in the Ocean dub and by Alyson Leigh Rosenfeld in the NYAV dub.

== Antagonists ==
=== ZAFT/PLANT Council ===
==== Rau Le Creuset ====
Rau Le Creuset (ラウ・ル・クルーゼ, Rau Ru Kurūze) is an elite ZAFT commander, a skilled mobile suit pilot, and an adept tactician, whose abilities are greatly valued by the ZAFT leadership. He always appears in public with his unique mask covering his face. He becomes famous early in the war during the Battle of Yggdrasil, using his ZGMF-1017M GINN High Maneuver Type mobile suit to destroy thirty-seven Earth Alliance mobile armors and six warships. Despite this fame, he is later revealed a danger to all of humanity and ultimately emerges as the series' main antagonist.

His birth name is Rau La Flaga (ラウ・ラ・フラガ, Rau Ra Furaga), the direct clone of Mu La Flaga's father, Al Da Flaga. Rau possesses spatial awareness, a trait he apparently inherited from his "father" and shares with his "brother" Mu. However, Rau has short telomeres within his DNA that cause him rapid aging problems. This is done intentionally, so that Rau can catch up to Mu in age and replace him. Rau takes a drug that stabilizes his aging; if he goes too long without taking the medication, he suffers intense pain. Rau adopted a misanthrophic position, deciding that all humans, Naturals and Coordinators, are not deserving to live, and plans the destruction of both.

In the final battle of the war, Rau pilots the ZGMF-X13A Providence Gundam, the final ZAFT suit. He battles with Kira Yamato in the ZGMF-X10A Freedom, who manages to surpass him. Before being finished, Rau and his mobile suit are destroyed by the self-destruction of GENESIS, dying with a smile on his face. In Gundam SEED Destiny, Gilbert Durandal, Rau's former friend and doctor, often imagines Rau conversing with him. He also appears in the final episode to Rey Za Burrel, another clone from Al who he was close with. He is voiced by Toshihiko Seki in Japanese. In English, he is voiced by Mark Oliver in the Ocean dub and by Kevin T. Collins in the NYAV Post dub.

==== Patrick Zala ====
Patrick Zala (パトリック・ザラ, Patorikku Zara), father of Athrun Zala, is the National Defense Committee Chairman who leads the radical faction of the PLANT Supreme Council. He lost his wife, Lenore Zala, in the Bloody Valentine Tragedy and blames all Naturals for her death. His grief over the death of his wife, Lenore, made him a man driven by hatred and revenge. This makes him easily manipulated by ZAFT Commander Rau Le Creuset, whom Patrick believes to be his right-hand man. Upon taking over the Plant Supreme Council, he emerges as one of the series' primary antagonists.

Zala has ZAFT construct the GENESIS superweapon and uses it in an effort to destroy all Naturals. Zala soon manages to destroy the Earth Alliance space fleet along with their lunar base at the Ptolemaeus Crater, effectively winning the battle. However, Zala orders the GENESIS to attack the Atlantic Federation capital, Washington. ZAFT Commander Ray Yuki protests such an action, as it would wipe out half of all life on Earth, for which Zala then shoots him. In his dying breath Yūki mortally wounds Zala. As he lies dying in Athrun's arms, Patrick tells his son to fire GENESIS on Earth and make his vision of a Coordinators' world come true. He is voiced by Kinryu Arimoto in Japanese. In English, he is voiced by Andrew Kavadas in the Ocean dub and by Marc Diraison the NYAV Post dub.

==== Eileen Canaver ====
Eileen Canaver (アイリーン・カナーバ, Airīn Kanāba) is a member of PLANT Supreme Council and Diplomatic Committee Chairwoman during the First Alliance-PLANT War. She represents the colony "September City" and her academic specialty is in information science.

In the closing days of the First Alliance-PLANT War, Canaver led Clyne Faction loyalists in a coup d'état of radical ZAFT leadership, before opening the PLANTs to negotiations with the Earth Alliance, after which, she became the Chairwoman of the Provisional Supreme Council. She was forced to resign after the signing of the Junius Treaty, which put the PLANTs at a significant disadvantage, and was succeeded by Gilbert Durandal. She is voiced by Naomi Shindō in Japanese. In English, she is Lisa Ann Beley in the Ocean dub and by Erin Fitzgerald in the NYAV dub.

==== Gilbert Durandal ====
Gilbert Durandal (ギルバート・デュランダル, Girubāto Dyurandaru) is the chairman of the PLANT Supreme Council and a member of the moderate political faction. Durandal is a man of science and medicine rather than politics, with the stated agenda of ending all conflicts between humans, especially the chasm between the Naturals and the Coordinators, i.e. the Earth and PLANT. Before he was Chairman of PLANT, Durandal was a brilliant young physician specializing in genetics and advanced biomedical techniques. He also was a friend of Rau Le Creuset, who was also his patient. Rau's inability to understand the purpose of his existence helped Durandal form his opinions about a perfect world society. Durandal also had a relationship with later Minerva Captain Talia Gladys but she left him because she wanted a child.

After Lord Djibril's death, Durandal proposes his "Destiny Plan", which is immediately opposed by the Atlantic Federation, the Kingdom of Scandinavia, and Orb. The Archangel's crew think his plan would be to implement a new world order where every human is given the role for which they are best genetically suited at birth, and this would fulfill Durandal's ideal of perfect genetic determinism, as this should be the ultimate goal of all Coordinators. Under this theory humans will no longer fight against others for things that they wish, since each person's destiny are predetermined at birth. During the attack on the Requiem, Durandal strikes with the mobile space fortress Messiah, which is armed with a Neo-Genesis array. However, his plans to destroy Orb failed when the Requiem was destroyed. Eventually Gilbert faces Kira Yamato. The Chairman warns Kira that, if he is killed, the world will descend into chaos. Durandal was shot by Rey, who through Kira's reasoning, saw that the Destiny Plan paid too high a price for peace and it would rob humanity of free will. His lover, Minerva's captain Talia and Rey, stayed behind in the crumbling fortress. The three of them are killed by falling debris and explosions. He is voiced by Shūichi Ikeda in Japanese. In English, he is voiced by Ted Cole in the Ocean dub and by Keith Silverstein in the NYAV dub.

==== Rey Za Burrel ====
Rey Za Burrel (レイ・ザ・バレル, Rei Za Bareru) is a ZAFT soldier of the Minerva and friend of Shinn Asuka. He begins piloting the classic ZAFT Zaku but later pilots one of ZAFT'S newest mobile suits, the ZGMF-X666S Legend. He is extremely loyal to Gilbert Durandal, who raised him since he was a child, and blindly supports the Destiny Plan, as he believes it will save humanity. During the series it is revealed that he, like Rau Le Creuset, is a clone of Al Da Flaga, created as a transaction in exchange for the funds to finance his Ultimate Coordinator project. Due to the way he was born, his telomeres are shortened, which causes him to rely on pain-relieving medication. Sharing a strong bond with Rau, Rey wishes to kill Kira Yamato for Rau's death.

At the end of the series, Rey is defeated by Kira in combat. Seeing his confrontation with Durandal, Rey shoots his superior, having been moved by his wish for a future of their own. As the Messiah collapses, Rey remains behind with Durandal and Talia Gladys—whom he refers to as mother—and dies with them. He is voiced by Toshihiko Seki in Japanese. In English, he is voiced by Kirby Morrow in the Ocean dub and by Kevin T. Collins in the NYAV dub. As a child, he is voiced by Houko Kuwashima in Japanese. In English, he is voiced by Lisa Ann Beley in the Ocean dub and by Michael Sinterniklaas in the NYAV dub.

=== Blue Cosmos/Logos ===
==== Muruta Azrael ====
Muruta Azrael (ムルタ・アズラエル, Muruta Azuraeru) is the leader of the Blue Cosmos interest group / terrorist organization, devoted to annihilating humanity's "enemies", the Coordinators, for the sake of a "blue and pure world". He wields enormous influence within the Earth Alliance due to his position as director of the Atlantic National Defense Conglomerate, the Alliance military's primary source of arms and munitions. In Gundam Seed Destiny, he is revealed to have a relative named Bruno within the powerful secret society known as Logos. After the Earth Alliance recaptures the mass driver at Victoria, Azrael decides to go into space on board the Dominion with the three Biological CPU pilots. When he gives the order to launch nuclear missiles at the PLANTs to inflict maximum damage to eliminate the threat to Earth, Natarle Badgiruel objects to his orders. he pulls a gun on her, frightening the other Dominion crew members into submission. Natarle intervenes, restraining him and ordering the rest of the crew to abandon ship. Azrael shoots Natarle during the struggle and then prepares to destroy the Archangel himself. When he fires the "Lohengrin", however, GAT-X105 Strike pilot Mu La Flaga takes the full force of the blast and saves the Archangel. In response, the Archangel destroys the Dominion with its own Lohengrin, killing Azrael and Captain Badgiruel in the process. He is voiced by Nobuyuki Hiyama in Japanese. In English, he is voiced by Andrew Francis in the Ocean dub and by Todd Haberkorn in the NYAV Post dub.

==== Shani Andras ====
Shani Andras (シャニ・アンドラス, Shani Andorasu) pilots the GAT-X252 Forbidden Gundam. Shani is antisocial, and prefers to fight alone to avoid interference from his teammates. Between missions, he blocks out the outside world by listening to music via headphones.

Shani is by far the most brutal of the human CPUs. Due to his insatiable lust for carnage and devastation, he often neglects orders to retreat and even attacks his own teammates while "having fun". Shani does not state Orga or Clotho's names. As the series progresses, he reveals himself to be a sadistic sociopath with no moral restraints whatsoever. In one instance in the story, he is seen eagerly anticipating the destruction of the PLANTS for the sole purpose of seeing "all the pretty lights". Shani is the first to die among the three. Shani is killed by Yzak Joule during the Second Battle of Jachin Due, when his GAT-X252 Forbidden is destroyed by Yzak's GAT-X102 Duel Gundam. He is voiced by Shunichi Miyamoto in Japanese. In English, he is voiced by Richard Ian Cox in the Ocean dub and by Jon Allen in the NYAV Post dub.

==== Clotho Buer ====
Clotho Buer (クロト・ブエル, Kuroto Bueru) is a talkative and quarrelsome person, who is constantly arguing with his teammates. While he fights in his GAT-X370 Raider Gundam, he enjoys shouting out video game–inspired battle cries. Between missions he spends his time playing on a portable game system called the "Great Wonder Swan XXX".

Depending on the version of Gundam SEED seen, Clotho is killed during the Second Battle of Jachin Due either by Yzak Joule in the GAT-X102 Duel using the Buster's rifle (original Gundam SEED), or by Dearka Elsman in the GAT-X103 Buster (Gundam SEED: Special Edition). According to the PlayStation 2 game Gundam SEED: Never Ending Tomorrow, Clotho is not killed by Dearka or Yzak, but dies due to his nervous system failing; however, it is seen that the GAT-X370 Raider is destroyed by Yzak. He is voiced by Hiro Yūki in Japanese. In English, he is voiced by Andrew Toth in the Ocean dub and by Tony Azzolino in the NYAV Post dub.

==== Orga Sabnak ====
Orga Sabnak (オルガ・サブナック, Oruga Sabunakku) is effectively the leader of the three biological CPUs. He uses tactics that are reckless and aggressive, causing him to often nearly hit his teammates while piloting his mobile suit, the GAT-X131 Calamity Gundam. He usually spends his time between missions reading paperback novels. He is also the only member of the team that seems to care about the welfare of the other two; when Shani is killed, he screams out his teammate's name, and tries to attack Shani's killer Yzak.

Unlike Clotho and Shani, who were killed by Yzak Joule, Orga is killed during the Second Battle of Jachin Due by Three Ships Alliance pilot Athrun Zala in the ZGMF-X09A Justice, equipped with the METEOR. Athrun slices Orga in half from behind as he is dodging a beam from Kira. In Japanese, he is voiced by Ryohei Odai. In English, he is voiced by Matt Smith in the Ocean dub and by Chris Jai Alex in the NYAV Post dub.

==== Lord Djibril ====
Lord Djibril (ロード・ジブリール, Rōdo Jiburīru) is a member of the secret society made up of the leadership of the military-industrial complex "Logos", and is also the successor to former Blue Cosmos leader, Muruta Azrael. Djibril decided that Junius Seven hitting the Earth would be a shameful incident for all those living on Earth, that the PLANTs (and by extension, all Coordinators) were at fault, and that they must all be exterminated; the members of Logos all agreed to this decision, hence reviving Blue Cosmos' plan to exterminate all Coordinators. When Djibril learned from Neo Roanoke that ZAFT forces were the instigators of the colony drop, he submitted the evidence to the people of Earth and Atlantic Federation President Joseph Copeland, thus starting the Second EA-ZAFT War. After Gilbert Durandal revealed to the world that Djibril and his Logos organization were behind the whole war, he was forced to go into hiding. Djibril was able to use the Requiem, a new Earth Alliance superweapon, in an attempt to destroy the seat of the PLANT Supreme Council, notably Durandal, at Aprilus One; however, interference by a ZAFT task force led by Yzak Joule caused Requiem to miss its intended target, instead destroying several other PLANTs. An attack on the Daedalus base by the Minerva led him to flee. In the end, Lord Djibril is killed by Rey Za Burrel when the ZGMF-X666S Legend destroys the Girty Lue, the ship Djibril was escaping on. He is voiced by Hideyuki Hori in Japanese. In English, he is by Alistair Abell in the Ocean dub and by Ian Sinclair in the NYAV dub.

==== Phantom Pain ====
The Phantom Pain group is led by Neo Roanoke, an amnesic Mu La Flaga brainwashed by Blue Cosmos.

==== Extendeds ====
===== Stella Loussier =====
Stella Loussier (ステラ・ルーシェ, Sutera Rūshe) (also known as Stellar Loussier in some markets) is one of the three Extended pilots from Phantom Pain under the command of Neo Roanoke. Together with her comrades Sting Oakley and Auel Neider, she infiltrates the PLANT colony Armory One and, with the help of some ZAFT-soldiers, they steal three new Gundam-type mobile suits. Stella pilots the ZGMF-X88S Gaia when fighting. While Stella is normally calm, whenever she hears the word "die" or anything related, she goes berserk, due to an intense fear of death. When she suffers from this trauma, Shinn Asuka, unaware of her identity, calms her promising to protect her. Stella befriends Shinn who discovers her identity when taking down the Gaia. Despite Shinn's attempts to keep her away from war, Neo makes her pilot the gigantic transformable mobile armour GFAS-X1 Destroy to attack a large swath of western Eurasia. Shinn tries to calm her, but when she loses control over her fear, Kira Yamato in the ZGMF-X10A Freedom attacks her, causing her death. She tells Shinn she loves him before her death, and reappears to him in the end of the series when Shinn is knocked unconscious, telling she will see him "tomorrow".

She came in 4th place in the 27th Anime Grand Prix and move up to 3rd place in the 28th one. In the 29th Anime Grand Prix, Stella was awarded 10th place in the Favorite Female category. She is voiced by Houko Kuwashima in Japanese. In English she is by Lalainia Lindbjerg in the Ocean dub and by Francesca Calo in the NYAV dub.

===== Auel Neider =====
Auel Neider (アウル・ニーダ, Auru Nīda) is one of the three Extended pilots of the Earth Alliance's special forces team Phantom Pain. He is the most impulsive and brutal of the three, killing his enemies mercilessly and even laughing crazily when he kills people. Together with his comrades, he sneaks into the PLANT colony Armory One, where he steals one of the three new Gundam-type mobile suits, the ZGMF-X31S Abyss. When ZAFT discovers a laboratory in Lodonia, Auel recalls that his mother was stationed there and promptly begins to freak out. Because of his psychological conditioning, he is rendered helpless when he hears his blockword, in his case the word "mother". Auel, in his confusion, says it out loud to himself and collapses in tears. The doctors on the ship quickly move to readjust his mentality. During the Battle of Crete his Gundam is destroyed by Shinn Asuka when the latter throws the beam javelin of his ZGMF-X56S/γ Blast Impulse into the abdomen of the Abyss, causing it to crash into the sea and explode underwater, and killing Auel in the process. He is voiced by Masakazu Morita in Japanese. In English, he is by Brad Swaile in the Ocean dub and by Ben Diskin in the NYAV dub.

===== Sting Oakley =====
Sting Oakley (スティング・オークレー, Sutingu Ōkurē) is one of the Extended Naturals of the Phantom Pain. Together with his comrades he sneaks into the PLANT colony Armory One, where he steals one of the three new Gundam-type mobile suits, the ZGMF-X24S Chaos. After various battles, he is transferred to the Earth Alliance stronghold Heaven's Base in Iceland. He pilots one of five GFAS-X1 Destroy units and defends Heaven's Base when ZAFT's Operation Ragnarok begins. Gradually losing whatever mental stability he has left during the battle, he is eventually killed by Shinn Asuka and his ZGMF-X42S Destiny, getting pierced by the Destiny's sword, while piloting the GFAS-X1 Destroy. He is voiced by Junichi Suwabe in Japanese. In English, he is voiced by Brent Miller in the Ocean dub and by Xander Mobus in the NYAV dub.

===== Sven Cal Bayang =====
Sven Cal Bayang (スウェン・カル・バヤン, Suwen Karu Bayan) is one of the main characters of the ONA side story Mobile Suit Gundam SEED C.E. 73: Stargazer. A member of the Phantom Pain special forces, he pilots the GAT-X105E Strike Noir. As a child, his parents were killed by a terrorist bombing at a space museum and thus he was taken into the anti-coordinator training program for the Alliance. He is voiced by Daisuke Ono.

==== Yuna Roma Seiran ====
Yuna Roma Seiran (ユウナ・ロマ・セイラン, Yūna Roma Seiran) is the son of Unato Ema Seiran, the prime minister of Orb that succeeded former Chief Representative Uzumi Nara Athha and Representative Homura after their deaths. Yuna is also Cagalli Yula Athha's fiancée by arranged marriage, a union that was approved of by both their parents, a fact that is revealed by Cagalli's caretaker Myrna. During the Battle of Dardanelles, Yuna acts as Supreme Commander of Orb's forces ready to intercept the Minerva. Later, after Logos is revealed to the world by Gilbert Durandal, Lord Djibril flees to Orb under protection by the Seirans. However, the Seirans deny sheltering Lord Djibril in Orb. Their denial is all for naught as ZAFT invades nonetheless. As the battle quickly turned against Orb, Cagalli returned to lead her country's forces. As Yuna was unable to successfully command, he was delighted at Cagalli's return and was easily tricked by her into returning control of Orb to her. Her first command was that Yuna be arrested for treason, an order many officers frustrated with his incompetence happily acknowledged, beating him up before subduing him. Yuna is ultimately killed by a falling ZGMF-2000 GOUF Ignited that lands on him when he attempts to flee from his Orb captors. He is voiced by Kenji Nojima in Japanese. In English, he is Brian Drummond in the Ocean dub and by Bryce Papenbrook in the NYAV dub.

=== Foundation ===
==== Aura Maha Khyber ====
The Queen of the Foundation, a breakaway nation from Eurasia that Aura Maha Khyber established with facilitation from Gilbert Durandal before his death. While she projects herself as a composed and cordial individual, Aura is an extremely arrogant and manipulative tyrant, suppressing all opposition to her rule with violence. Her childlike appearance is the result of accidental toxic exposure to de-aging chemicals she had been working with as a solution to low-birth rates in the PLANTs.

Once a brilliant geneticist, she had been a rival of Ulen Hibiki, the lead researcher of Ultimate Coordinator project, and engineered the Accords, an advanced version of Coordinators that she envisioned as the future of humanity. As a result, she looks down on Kira Yamato, considering him as inferior to her Accords and unsuitable as a partner for Lacus Clyne, revealed to also be an Accord. As a proponent of Gilbert Durandal's beliefs, Aura created Foundation with the intention of implementing a variation of Durandal's Destiny Plan, with the Accords to rule the world. Her absolute belief in her infallability leads her to repeatedly underestimate her enemies, eventually leading to her death, the destruction of Black Knights, and the downfall of Foundation. Aura is voiced by Yukari Tamura in Japanese and Lizzie Freeman in the English.

==== Orphee Lam Tao ====
Orphee Lam Tao is the Prime Minister of the Kingdom of Foundation and the leader of the Black Knights. Outwardly appearing noble and gentle, he is actually calculating and cruel, and exhibits an egotistical and narcissist attitude stemming from his belief that he is superior to all humanity, including all Coordinators, because he is an Accord and that human worth is determined solely by their genes. Aura Maha Khyber designed him with the intention of ruling the world with Lacus Clyne, leading him to attempt to exploit and control Lacus into accepting him romantically due to their genetics. However, he is rejected by Lacus, who believes that a person's future is not decided by their genetics and because she chooses to love Kira Yamato. Orphee is defeated by Kira and Lacus in battle at the end of the Foundation conflict and dies alongside fellow Accord Ingrid Tradoll. Orphee Lam Tao is voiced by Hiro Shimono in Japanese and Alejandro Saab in English.

==== The Black Knights ====
The elite mobile suit squad of Foundation, composed entirely of Accords, created and fostered by Aura Maha Khyber. The members of the Black Knights also serve as ministers in Foundation's government.

== Supporting characters ==
=== Archangel crew ===
==== Murrue Ramius ====
Murrue Ramius (マリュー・ラミアス, Maryū Ramiasu) is thrust into the role of the captain of the Earth Alliance assault ship Archangel, after the ship's original commanding officers are killed during a ZAFT assault on the Heliopolis space colony. She meets Kira during this assault, and as Kira saves her using Heliopolis' mobile suit against ZAFT, she forces him and his friends to stay at the Archangel for seeing the military's secrets. Captain Ramius deserts the Earth Alliance Forces after the Atlantic Federation's betrayal at the Battle of JOSH-A. The Archangel joins with the Clyne Faction to stop both the Earth Alliance and ZAFT from destroying each other. Across the series, she starts romantic relationship with Lieutenant Mu La Flaga and is shocked when Mu is apparently killed in the end of the series. In Gundam SEED Destiny, Ramius returns to the Archangel to interfere with the new war alongside former comrades. When Logos' Neo Roanoke is defeated by the Archangel, she recognizes him as Mu, but he does not remember his former life. As the war continues, Mu starts recovering his memories and Ramius and him continue their relationship. Masatsugu Iwase early designed her for the Gundam SEED manga as a kind-hearted person, despite being the head of the Archangel as she is wedged between her superiors who issue unreasonable orders and Natarle as she tends to ignore Murrue's orders. She is voiced by Kotono Mitsuishi in Japanese. In English, she is voiced by Lisa Ann Beley in the Ocean dub and by Carrie Keranen in the NYAV Post dub, respectively.

==== Natarle Badgiruel ====
Natarle Badgiruel (ナタル・バジルール, Nataru Bajirūru) is the executive officer of the Archangel, and supervises the ship's Combat Information Center. Natarle is stern and operates by the book, though she is willing to do almost anything to reach a certain end—even when it conflicts with Captain Ramius. Nevertheless, Natarle is a superb tactical analyst with keen judgment and a knack for swift decision-making, which makes her a valuable asset to the Archangel. After Natarle leaves the Archangel on a transfer order while in Alaska, she is recruited by the Earth Alliance and made captain of the Dominion, which forced her to battle against the Archangel. After witnessing the actions of Muruta Azrael of Blue Cosmos, Natarle chooses to defy the Earth Alliance, which results in her and Azrael's death. She is voiced by Houko Kuwashima in Japanese. In English, she is voiced by Sarah Johns in the Ocean dub and by Lisa Ortiz in the NYAV Post dub.

==== Mu La Flaga ====
Mu La Flaga (ムウ・ラ・フラガ, Mū Ra Furaga) is a veteran mobile armor ace, and a longtime rival of ZAFT officer Rau Le Creuset, with whom he demonstrates a strange extrasensory connection—and whom he later finds out to be his brother, created as a clone of his father. A laid-back man with a thick-skinned attitude toward war, Mu is casually boastful of his preternatural abilities, sometimes calling himself the man who can make the impossible possible. After the attack on Heliopolis, Mu joins the crew of the Archangel and develops a relationship with Captain Murrue Ramius. During the course of the series, Mu becomes the pilot of the GAT-X105 Strike, while HD remastered version he instead pilots the GAT-X105 Perfect Strike, a combination of the Strike and its Striker Packs.

Mu is seemingly killed after protecting the Archangel from a positron cannon. In Gundam SEED Destiny, Mu is revealed to be alive, but brainwashed by Logos into the identity Neo Roanoke (ネオ・ロアノーク, Neo Roanōku)—the captain in the Earth Alliance force Phantom Pain. After being captured by the Archangel, Neo experiences flashbacks of his life as Mu, and begins to doubt his identity and memories. Mu then rejoins the Archangel to help end the war and becomes the pilot of the ORB-01 Akatsuki mobile suit. At the end of Gundam SEED Destiny, Mu blocks a positron cannon from hitting the Archangel (mirroring the events at the end of Gundam SEED), causing him to regain his memories. He stays with Murrue after the events of the sequel. He is voiced by Takehito Koyasu in Japanese. In English, he is voiced by Trevor Devall in the Ocean dub and by Tom Wayland in the NYAV Post dub, though Devall would reprise his role in the English dub of Mobile Suit Gundam SEED Freedom.

==== Arnold Neumann ====
Arnold Neumann (アーノルド・ノイマン, Ānorudo Noiman) was the ranking non-commissioned officer of the Earth Alliance warship Archangel at the start of the series. He was one of few original members of the crew to survived the ZAFT attack on Heliopolis. He serves as the pilot of the Archangel during both wars. The character is voiced by Isshin Chiba in Japanese. In English, he is voiced by Philip Pacaud in the Ocean dub and by Ben Pronsky in the NYAV Post dub.

==== Martin DaCosta ====
Martin DaCosta (マーチン・ダコスタ, Māchin Dakosuta) is Andrew Waltfeld's second in command on board the Lesseps until it is heavily damaged by the Archangel and Waltfeld is defeated by Kira Yamato's GAT-X105 Strike. Later, Martin DaCosta joins the Clyne Faction and helps move Lacus Clyne underground after the theft of the ZGMF-X10A Freedom. DaCosta then helps rescue Athrun Zala, who has been held prisoner by his father, Patrick Zala, at the request of Lacus. He is successful in rescuing Athrun and the two escape to the Eternal, a new ZAFT support ship stolen by the Clyne Faction, which has his former superior Andy as a captain. He is voiced by Akira Sasanuma in Japanese. In English, he is voiced by Brian Dobson in the Ocean dub and by Robbie Friedman in the NYAV Post dub.

==== Andrew Waltfeld ====
Andrew "Andy" Waltfeld (アンドリュー・バルトフェルト, Andoryū Barutoferuto) also known as Desert tiger is the commander of the ZAFT forces in the PLANT-pledged African Community, headquartered at Banadiya. He lives with his lover Aisha, who assists him in his military operations and eventually serves as the co-pilot of his TMF/A-803 LaGOWE. Unlike other ZAFT and Earth Alliance officers, he is surprisingly humane and well aware of the repercussions of war. After forcing Kira Yamato to battle him, Andrew and Aisha are seemingly killed in the explosion. Andrew is later seen alive, having been saved by Aisha and losing his left eye, left arm, and right leg in the process. After discovering Rau Le Creuset's true intentions to destroy the universe—confirming his longtime suspicions—he defects from ZAFT and assists the Archangel's goal in ending the war. He is voiced by Ryotaro Okiayu in Japanese. In English, he is voiced by Brian Drummond in the Ocean dub and by Matt Giroveanu in the NYAV Post dub.

==== Miriallia Haw ====
Miriallia Haw (ミリアリア・ハウ, Miriaria Hau) is a Natural from the colony Heliopolis and is a friend of Kira, and girlfriend from Tolle Koenig. When Heliopolis is destroyed by ZAFT, she and her friends become refugees on the Archangel. With Kira forced to use the Strike to protect the ship, Mirallia and her friends join the Archangel's group to support him with Miralia becoming assigned to monitor and communicate with Archangel's mobile suit and mobile armor complement. They stay with the Archangel as official military personnel, but Miriallia is shocked when Tolle is killed by Athrun during an encounter against ZAFT. Despite her anger towards ZAFT's Dearka Elsman for joking about Tolle's death, she concludes that revenge will not bring him back to life. In the start of Gundam SEED Destiny, Miriallia is initially a freelance photographer, but later joins the Archangel in their attempt to stop the new war. She is voiced by Megumi Toyoguchi in Japanese. In English, she is voiced by Anna Cummer in the Ocean dub and by Cassandra Lee Morris in the NYAV dub.

==== Sai Argyle ====
Sai Argyle (サイ・アーガイル, Sai Āgairu) is a friend of Kira Yamato from Heliopolis. When the colony is raided by ZAFT, he ends up with his friends on the Archangel. Sai is put in charge of enemy detection and electronic warfare identification in the Combat Information Center of the Archangel. Initially, Sai is in a relationship with Flay Allster, but she breaks it off in favor of Kira, which enrages Sai to the point where he tries to move the Strike. Sai does not try to win back Flay, and comes to accept that she is with Kira—who is later reported missing in action. With Kira gone, Flay attempts to restart her relationship with Sai, denying she ever felt any emotions for Kira; Sai refuses to believe her. Later, Sai makes peace with Kira, and the two of them remain on good terms for the remainder of their enlistment together. Sai continues to serve at his post on the Archangel throughout the rest of the war. He returns to civilian life at the end of the war and does not appear in Gundam SEED Destiny. He is voiced by Tetsu Shiratori in Japanese. In English, he is voiced by Bill Switzer in the Ocean dub and by Lucien Dodge in the NYAV dub.

==== Flay Allster ====
Flay Allster (フレイ・アルスター, Furei Arusutā) is the daughter of Atlantic Federation Vice Foreign Minister George Allster. She is a pretty, popular, and to some extent spoiled, Heliopolis technical college student. Her fiancé is Sai Argyle, as arranged for by their parents. When Heliopolis is attacked by ZAFT, she becomes a refugee from the Archangel, where she reveals her indifference towards Coordinators. Her father dies when his ship is attacked by ZAFT forces, and she grows shocked from this. However, as she realizes that as Kira is the only person able to save the Archangel, she enlists herself in the military to persuade him to continue fighting against his will. During this time, Flay pretends to be in love with Kira in order to stay with him, breaking up with Sai. As time passes, Flay ends up genuinely falling in love with Kira, which causes her to develop guilt for her actions. As Kira becomes more determined with protecting the Archangel, he breaks up with Flay. Later, when Flay is transferred from the Archangel, she encounters ZAFT's Rau Le Creuset during an infiltration mission. Rau kidnaps Flay and later sends her in a pod to the Dominion ship from the Earth Alliance. Flay starts working for the Dominion ship in hopes of meeting her friends again, but when Azrael tries to go against the captain's orders, Flay and the other crew from the ship are sent to an escape vessel. As Kira tries to rescue the vessel, Rau's mobile suit destroys it, killing Flay instantly. However, she dies happy, feeling she now understood most people's situations. According to Masatsugu Iwase, artist of the Mobile Suit Gundam SEED manga, he first envisioned Flay as a mascot before he did the manga. It was only after doing her character design that she acts similarly to an actress. She is voiced by Houko Kuwashima in Japanese. In English, she is voiced by Tabitha St. Germain in the Ocean dub and by Erica Mendez in the NYAV dub.

==== Tolle Koenig ====
Tolle Koenig (トール・ケーニヒ, Tōru Kēnihi) is one of Kira Yamato's friends who lives on the neutral colony Heliopolis, the boyfriend of Miriallia Haw. Tolle was the first one to defend Kira when Kira's Coordinator heritage causes the Archangel's soldiers to point their rifles at Kira. He serves as a co-pilot and operator of the Archangel. Later, he volunteers to pilot the second FX-550 Skygrasper, formerly piloted by Cagalli Yula Athha. He is ultimately killed in action by Athrun Zala. He is voiced by Takayuki Inoue in Japanese. In English, he is voiced by Richard Ian Cox in the Ocean dub and by Colin DePaula in the NYAV dub.

=== Le Creuset team ===
Athrun's ZAFT team captured in a photo from Gundam SEED. From left: Dearka, Olor, Yzak, Miguel, Nicol (front), Rusty, and Athrun.

==== Miguel Aiman ====
Miguel Aiman (ミゲル・アイマン, Migeru Aiman) is a Coordinator and a Green member of the Le Creuset team. After hearing that Rusty Mackenzie was killed before he could capture the GAT-X105 Strike, Miguel tries to take it himself. However, he is forced to retreat after Kira Yamato takes control of the Strike. Thinking that a Natural was piloting the Strike, Miguel is humiliated by his defeat and vows to get revenge as he heads back towards Heliopolis after acquiring another GINN. Instead, he winds up being the first person Kira kills. He is voiced by Takanori Nishikawa in Japanese. In English, he is voiced by Tony Sampson in the Ocean dub and by Yuri Lowenthal in the NYAV Post dub.

==== Nicol Amalfi ====
Nicol Amalfi (ニコル・アマルフィ, Nikoru Amarufi) is the youngest member of the Le Creuset team; he pilots the GAT-X207 Blitz, which he steals during the raid on Heliopolis. He is mostly calm and good-natured, and becomes friends with Athrun Zala. His thoughts of the war are moderate, and he says in one episode that he joined ZAFT after hearing what happened to Junius Seven, but never really wanted to fight. A gifted musician, his favorite instrument is the piano. While trying to protect Athrun in battle near the Orb Union, Nicol is killed by Kira Yamato. He is voiced by Mami Matsui in the anime and by Romi Park in later media appearances in Japanese. In English, he is voiced by Gabe Khouth in the Ocean dub and by Casey Mongillo in the NYAV dub.

==== Dearka Elsman ====
Dearka Elsman (ディアッカ・エルスマン, Diakka Erusuman) is an arrogant pilot of ZAFT's Rau Le Creuset team who looks down on Naturals. He is part of the crew that invaded Heliopolis to steal mobile suits, piloting the GAT-X103 Buster. During the course of the series, Dearka is captured by the Archangel, where he meets Kira's friends—which prompts him to change his opinions about Naturals. Seeing how both the Earth Alliance and ZAFT had become controlled by genocidal individuals such as Muruta Azrael and Patrick Zala, Dearka retakes his Buster and fights alongside the Archangel. During the Gundam SEED series, Dearka begins a short-lived relationship with Miriallia Haw. In Gundam SEED Destiny, Dearka is court martialed for being a traitor and is made a regular ZAFT soldier again. He is voiced by Akira Sasanuma in Japanese. In English, he is voiced by Brad Swaile in the Ocean dub and by Johnny Yong Bosch in the NYAV dub.

==== Yzak Joule ====
Yzak Joule (イザーク・ジュール, Izāku Jūru) is originally part of Rau Le Creuset's team and part of the force that invades Heliopolis. He pilots the stolen mobile suit GAT-X102 Duel. During a confrontation with Kira Yamato, Kira inflicts a wound upon Yzak's face that leaves a scar and causes Yzak to swear vengeance. Initially a cold-blooded, remorseless killer, Yzak becomes disgusted by the act of war and doubts whether ZAFT's intentions are correct. In a combination of Dearka Elsman's words and witnessing the destructive power of the Genesis, Yzak sides with the Archangel in order to stop ZAFT's plan on destroying Earth. During the events of Gundam SEED Destiny, Yzak is seen as the commander of a ZAFT faction. He is voiced by Tomokazu Seki in Japanese. In English, he is voiced by Michael Adamthwaite in the Ocean dub, and by Daman Mills in the NYAV dub.

=== Minerva crew ===
==== Talia Gladys ====
Talia Gladys (タリア・グラディス, Taria Guradisu) is the captain of the Minerva. She is loyal to the ZAFT army and follows through her orders, even if she dislikes them. Nevertheless, she often tries to disobey her orders in favor of a more peaceful outcome to the battles. She is Gilbert Durandal's mistress, who left him as she wanted to have a child. When the Minerva is defeated by the Archangel, Talia goes to see Durandal just as he is shot by Rey. She decides to die with the two of them, telling Kira Yamato about her son, and that she wants captain Murrue Ramius to visit him. She is voiced by Mami Koyama in Japanese. In English, she is voiced by Venus Terzo in the Ocean dub and by Valerie Arem in the NYAV dub.

==== Meyrin Hawke ====
Meyrin Hawke (メイリン・ホーク, Meirin Hooku) is Lunamaria Hawke's younger sister and the communications controller (CIC) officer of the Minerva and later the Eternal. A timid and shy girl, she develops a crush on Athrun Zala, but is less open than her sister about her affection. When Athrun defects from ZAFT, she assists him in escaping and ultimately accompanies him. She then joins the Archangel's crew and assists them in their attempts to stop the war. She is reunited with her sister in the OVA from the series, following ZAFT's defeat. She is voiced by Fumiko Orikasa in Japanese. In English, she is voiced by Nicole Bouma in the Ocean dub, and by Christine Marie Cabanos in the NYAV dub.

==== Arthur Trine ====
Arthur Trine (アーサー・トライン, Āsā Torain) is the executive officer of the Minerva. Much of his role is to provide comic relief. Arthur lacks his captain's experience and tactical ability, and he is often bewildered by her decisions. At the Battle of Messiah, Gladys told him to look after everyone when the Minerva was damaged and crashed on the Moon. Following the end of the second EA-ZAFT War, Arthur is seen in Special Edition IV as a black coat officer. He is among the members of ZAFT under Lacus Clyne, alongside Dearka Elsman, Yzak and Shiho. He is voiced by Hiroki Takahashi in Japanese. In English, he is voiced by Jonathan Holmes in the Ocean dub and by Robbie Daymond in the NYAV dub.

==== Heine Westenfluss ====
Heine Westenfluss (ハイネ・ヴェステンフルス, Haine Vesutenfurusu) is a Coordinator ZAFT pilot, who piloted a ZGMF-1001 Blaze ZAKU Phantom before becoming the pilot of the ZGMF-X2000 GOUF Ignited. Heine is decidedly an optimistic, but realistic, soldier who did not stand too much on ceremony, and was also quite talkative and earnest in his attempts to raise the morale of his fellow pilots. During the Battle of Dardanelles, Heine pilots the ZGMF-X2000 GOUF Ignited, which he uses to battle Stella Loussier's ZGMF-X88S Gaia. His GOUF Ignited's primary offensive functions are disabled by the ZGMF-X10A Freedom, piloted by Kira Yamato. While attempting to counter-attack Kira, Heine and his GOUF Ignited are sliced in half by Stella as she tried to attack the Freedom, destroying the suit and killing him in the process. He is voiced in Takanori Nishikawa in Japanese. In English, he is voiced by Brian Dobson in the Ocean dub and by Michael Sinterniklaas in the NYAV dub.

=== Orb Union ===
==== Uzumi Nara Athha ====
Uzumi Nara Athha (ウズミ・ナラ・アスハ, Uzumi Nara Asuha) is the leader of the Orb Union and the adoptive father of Cagalli Yula Athha. He is known to be dedicated to the well-being of his nation and uncompromising on his own ideals and the ideals of Orb. When the Earth Alliance invades Orb to acquire their mass driver, Uzumi reveals to Cagalli that Kira Yamato is her brother, and forces her to leave Orb before he self-detonates it to prevent the Earth Alliance from using their equipment for war. He is voiced by Toru Ohkawa in Japanese. In English, he is voiced by John Novak in the Ocean dub and by J. David Brimmer in the NYAV Post dub.

==== Erica Simmons ====
A senior engineer of Morgenroete, the munitions company which equips the Orb Union's armed forces, Erica Simmons is responsible for developing the M1 Astray, a new mobile suit intended for use by the Orb military. After the Archangel reaches Orb, she requests Kira's help in perfecting the Astray's operating system. Though dedicated to her work, Erica is also a devoted mother to her young son Ryuta. Erica was among the Orb personnel evacuated into space aboard the Kusanagi. She is voiced by Michiyo Yanagisawa in Japanese. In English, she is voiced by Sharon Alexander in the Ocean and by Erica Schroeder in the NYAV Post dub.

=== COMPASS ===
COMPASS is a world peace monitoring organization introduced in Mobile Suit Gundam SEED Freedom formed to promote peace on Earth and PLANTS, with Orb Chief Representative Cagalli Yula Athha as one of its overseers and Lacus Clyne as the organization's president.

Members of the organization include Kira Yamato, Athrun Zala, Shinn Asuka, and the crews of the Archangel and the Minerva.

==== Agnes Giebenrath ====
A former ZAFT recruit and old classmate of Shinn Asuka and Lunamaria Hawke, Agnes Giebenrath is introduced as a pilot for Compass in the squad led by Kira Yamato. She is arrogant and vain, looking down on both Shinn and Lunamaria's piloting skills as inferior to her own and is known for pursuing men regardless of their relationship status. She openly flirts with Kira, viewing herself as a better woman to Lacus Clyne, despite Kira's clear rejection of Agnes's advances. Agnes later betrays Compass and assists the Black Knights of the Kingdom of Foundation to defeat Kira, believing that Black Knights member Shura Serpentine had recognized her self-perceived superiority. She is defeated by her rival Lunamaria in battle at the end of Foundation conflict. She is voiced by Houko Kuwashima in Japanese. In English, she is voiced by Kelly Baskin in the NYAV Post dub.

=== Others ===
==== Reverend Malchio ====
Reverend Malchio (マルキオ師, Marukio-shi) is a blind priest trusted by both the PLANTs and Earth Alliance, thus allowing him to serve as an occasional envoy between the two. He is also closely aligned to the Junk Guild and a mentor to Prayer Reverie. He runs an orphanage in the Marshall Islands. In the events of Gundam SEED, he brings the injured Kira Yamato to Lacus Clyne with Lowe Guele's aid. When Malchio is visited by Athrun, the reverend consults with him. Sometime between the Battle of Mendel and the Battle of Boaz, Malchio negotiates a treaty between the Junk Guild and the Three Ships Alliance, allowing the Junk Guild vessel ReHOME to act as the tender ship of the Three Ships Alliance.

After the war, Kira and Lacus move in with Malchio and all of the orphans under his care. Two years later, Reverend Malchio remains much where he was left off at the end of the first series. When the second EA-ZAFT War begins, he plays much the same role as he did before as well. He is voiced by Kazuya Nakai in Japanese. In English, he is voiced by Brian Drummond in the Ocean dub and by Ezra Weisz in the NYAV dub.

==== Meer Campbell ====
Meer Campbell (ミーア・キャンベル, Mīa Kyanberu) is a young woman who received plastic surgery to look like Lacus Clyne. She is used by Gilbert Durandal to rally the citizens of PLANT into supporting him. Meer is flirty and tends to be very excitable, especially in Athrun's presence. When she first meets Athrun, she introduces herself as Meer Campbell, and admits she is not Lacus Clyne. Throughout the series, Meer attempts to get closer to Athrun, though Athrun never encourages her and tells her that the real Lacus would not do any of the things which she does. When he defects, Athrun attempts to convince her to escape Gibraltar with him; she refuses, claiming that she prefers to be Lacus Clyne.

During the course of the series, the real Lacus's appearance causes the public to realize Meer is a fake. At her bodyguard's suggestion, Meer offers to bait Lacus out of hiding to have her assassinated, so Meer could be the "real" Lacus. During their meeting, Lacus persuades Meer into living as herself. Meer dies shortly after she protects Lacus from a bullet intended for her. She is voiced by Rie Tanaka in Japanese. In English, she is voiced by Chantal Strand in the Ocean dub and by Stephanie Sheh in the NYAV dub.

==== George Glenn ====
George Glenn (ジョージ・グレン, Jōji Guren) is humanity's first Coordinator, he obtained his doctorate from the Massachusetts Institute of Technology (MIT) at the age of 17. Realizing various achievements in life, Glenn would embark on the Jupiter Exploration Mission for the Atlantic Federation's FASA (Federal Aeronautics and Space Administration). Before he embarked on his journey, he revealed his origins to the humankind, and the reasons for his superior mental and physical energy. Fourteen years later, a Natural who was angry that he was not born a Coordinator assassinated Glenn in C.E. 53. He is voiced by Hideyuki Hori in Japanese and by Michael Dobson in English.

==== Siegel Clyne ====
Father to Lacus Clyne, Siegel Clyne (シーゲル・クライン, Shīgeru Kurain) is chairman of the PLANT Supreme Council and the leader of its moderate faction. When Lacus helps Kira steal the mobile suit ZGMF-X10A Freedom for him to pilot Siegel and his daughter are declared as traitors. He is later killed by ZAFT soldiers. He is voiced by Yousuke Akimoto in the Japanese dub and in English by Don Brown in Ocean dub and Christopher Sabat in the NYAV Post dub.

==== Courtney Heironimus ====
Courtney Heironimus (コートニー・ヒエロニムス, Kōtonī Hieronimusu) is a ZAFT test pilot with prodigal sense of piloting, that is known to have tested a large amount of ZAFT mobile suits. Before joining ZAFT he was a civilian with technology background. Near the end of the first EA-ZAFT War, he was the test pilot for the prototype GMF-X999A ZAKU Trial Type. During this testing, he encountered a large squadron of Earth Alliance GAT-02L2 Dagger L mobile suits during test runs of the ZAKU in the South American rainforest. Ignoring the treaty between ZAFT and the Earth Alliance that no fighting would occur in neutral zones, the Dagger Ls attacked and were subsequently wiped out. Before the beginning of the second EA-ZAFT War, Courtney is known to have been the test pilot of the experimental XMF-P192P Proto Chaos mobile armor, and later its complete form, the ZGMF-X24S Chaos. When the Chaos is stolen he again pilots the Proto Chaos to fight against a separate group that attacks Armory One. His current position in the Cosmic Era was as pilot of ZGMF-X56S Impulse Unit 03, equipped with a Destiny Sillouette, at the Battle of Messiah. After the war he returns to the Verne Developmental Corp.

=== ODR ===
Orb Disaster Relief (オーブ国際救助隊, Ōbu Kokusai Kyūjotai) is a sister military under by United Emirates of Orb Union, Ministry of Foreign Affairs, under Commander-in-Chief Cagalli Yula Athha. The organization falls under the jurisdiction of the International Cooperation Agency and Auxiliary Organization of Orb, Ministry of Foreign Affairs, and is colloquially known as the Orb Disaster Relief Team, or ODR for short. The team is ostensibly an organization for international contribution and cooperation, and takes on a wide range of missions involving medical care, education, technical exchange, and international goodwill. They are dispatched all over the world for missions and to fulfill troublesome tasks every time they receive orders.

Associated members to the group include Captain Murrue Ramius, Ensign Miriallia Haw, Meyrin Hawke, and Former ZAFT Lieutenant mobile suit pilot and current ORB admiral Athrun Zala.

==== Tatsumi Hiroi ====
Tatsumi Hiroi (広井 辰巳, Hiroi Tatsumi) has average physical strength, IQ, and other skills due to being a naturally born human being, but somehow displays skills that surpass Coordinators when piloting the MVF-X08 Eclipse Gundam.

==== Miyabi Oto Kiou ====
Miyabi Oto Kiou (既往 音 雅, Kiō Oto Miyabi) is a Coordinator who has various extraordinary abilities, but is pessimistic about the current social situation due to her complicated upbringing. She is a free thinker and an achiever, despite growing up in a wealthy family.

==== Ken Norland Suse ====
Ken Norland Suse (ケン・ノーランド・スセ, Suse Norando Ken) has an exceptional IQ, physical abilities, and MS maneuvering skills. He has withdrawn himself from the war between Naturals and Coordinators.

== Reception ==
The characters from Gundam SEED and Gundam SEED Destiny have been well received by anime fans. In the Anime Grand Prix polls, various characters have been featured as one of the most popular ones; both Kira and Athrun have been featured at the top of male anime characters category with the former being featured and the latter once. Meanwhile, Lacus was at the top of female anime characters various times.
