= Lacus Clyne =

Fictional character

- Mobile Suit Gundam SEED, Mobile Suit Gundam SEED Destiny character
- Lacus Clyne in the Mobile Suit Gundam SEED OVA
- First appearance: Mobile Suit Gundam SEED episode 7
- Voiced by: Rie Tanaka (Japanese); Chantal Strand (English, Ocean); Jillian Michaels (English singing voice, Ocean); Stephanie Sheh (English, NYAV)

In-universe information
- Family: Siegel Clyne (father)
- Significant others: Athrun Zala (ex-fiancé); Kira Yamato (boyfriend)
- Genetic type: Coordinator (Accord)

Lacus Clyne (Japanese: ラクス・クライン, Hepburn: Rakusu Kurain) is a fictional character introduced in the Japanese science fiction anime television series Mobile Suit Gundam SEED and appearing in the sequels Mobile Suit Gundam SEED Destiny and Mobile Suit Gundam SEED Freedom, all three of which are part of the Gundam franchise by Sunrise. In the start of Mobile Suit Gundam SEED, Lacus is a good natured and popular female vocalist from the space colony PLANT. Born as a genetically enhanced human, a Coordinator (later revealed to be an Accord), Lacus is introduced when she is found in space by the battleship the Archangel, a ship of regular humans, the Naturals. Late in the war between the races of Coordinators and Naturals, Lacus becomes the co-leader of the Clyne Faction, joining with the Archangel to stop both sides from fighting. Lacus is voiced in the Japanese series by Rie Tanaka. In the Ocean English dub, her speaking voiced is done by Chantal Strand, while Jillian Michaels does her singing voice. In the NYAV English dub, she is voiced by Stephanie Sheh.

Lacus' character has also appeared in different adaptations from Gundam SEED and Gundam SEED Destiny, as well as various video games. Her character has been popular in Japan, appearing at the top of Animage's Anime Grand Prix polls four times in the category of most popular female anime characters. She has also appeared in other popularity polls from Sunrise and other magazines. Moreover, publications for manga, anime and other media have commented on Lacus' character, giving her praise; speculations regarding her role in the series were made, but in the end it was found surprising.

== Appearances ==
=== In the TV series ===
In Mobile Suit Gundam SEED, Lacus Clyne is the daughter of PLANT Supreme Council Chairman Siegel Clyne. Often seen with Haro machines, Lacus is one of the genetically enhanced humans known as Coordinators whose career as an idol singer has brought her enormous popularity. When she is dispatched to the ruins of Junius Seven, her vessel is attacked by an Earth Alliance battleship, a faction composed of Natural that oppose PLANT. Her lifepod is subsequently rescued by the mobile suit GAT-X105 Strike and brought to the Earth Alliance ship Archangel. There Lacus befriends the Strike pilot Kira Yamato while most of the others remain indifferent because she is a Coordinator. In the following battle, ZAFT forces attacking the Archangel are forced to retreat after Lacus is used as a hostage by Natarle Badgiruel. Disgusted by this action, Kira escorts Lacus back to ZAFT in secret. He hands her over to Athrun Zala, who is engaged to Lacus. Late in the war, a wounded Kira is brought to Lacus' home by her friend Reverend Malchio. As Kira is nursed back to health, he resolves to keep fighting in order to find a way to end the war. In response, Lacus helps Kira steal the mobile suit ZGMF-X10A Freedom. Because of this, Lacus and her father Siegel are declared as traitors and the latter is killed by ZAFT soldiers. Lacus steals the ship Eternal and joins the Orb Union-owned Kusanagi and the recently defected Archangel to form the Three Ships Alliance, a group dedicated to stopping the war. Before the last battle to stop both the Earth Alliance and ZAFT, Lacus gives Kira a ring, asking him to come back safely to her.

At the start of Mobile Suit Gundam SEED Destiny, Lacus is living with Kira at Reverend Malchio's orphanage in the Marshall Islands. However, a disaster from the new war forces them to move in with their former comrades Andrew Waltfeld and Murrue Ramius at their shared mansion in Orb. Lacus is almost killed in an assassination attempt by Coordinators but Kira defeats the assassins with the Freedom. She, along with Murrue, Kira, Andrew, and most of the Archangel's crew reunite hoping to stop the new war. Lacus, along with Andrew, go into space, to see what the situation is at the PLANTs. She delivers the newly built Strike Freedom and Infinite Justice mobile suits to Kira and Athrun during her returning. She also reveals her presence to the public and the fact that ZAFT has been using an impersonation of her for their own benefit. Later, Lacus and Kira reveal to the crew of the Archangel Durandal's plan to assign behavioral genes to every human being in order to render war and conflict obsolete. Lacus then leads Terminal and its allies in the final battle to stop Durandal.

=== In other media ===
Apart from her role in the original series, Lacus is also featured in the original video animation Mobile Suit Gundam SEED Destiny Final Plus. After Durandal's death, Lacus is invited back to the PLANTs to serve as a mediator between ZAFT and the other nations. She also appears in two series of films Mobile Suit Gundam SEED: Special Edition and Mobile Suit Gundam SEED Destiny: Special Edition which retell the events from its respective series. In the end of the OVA as well as Gundam SEED Destiny: Special Edition, Lacus remains as a member of the PLANT Supreme Council. She is also featured in the manga adaptations of both Gundam SEED and Gundam SEED Destiny, the latter also including Mobile Suit Gundam SEED Destiny: The Edge. Two CDs soundtracks have also been released based on Lacus' character featuring tracks by her Japanese voice actress, Tanaka Rie. Lacus is a playable character in both video games Gundam SEED Destiny: OMNI vs ZAFT II and Dynasty Warriors: Gundam 2, she also appears in Super Robot Wars Alpha 3, Super Robot Wars Judgement, Super Robot Wars W and Super Robot Wars K as captain of the Eternal. Lacus is a Pilot in Dynasty Warriors: Gundam 2 piloting the Strike Freedom and Infinite Justice. In a collection mission she is seen piloting a ball. She also shows up in the SD Gundam G Generation games.

== Reception ==
Lacus Clyne consistently ranked highly in the most popular female category in the Animage Anime Grand Prix poll in the 25th to 30th editions of the poll. In the 27th to 29th versions of the poll, Lacus Clyne placed first in this category. In another poll, she was voted as the second most popular female anime character from the 2000s. In a poll organized by Sunrise regarding which was the best couple in the Gundam franchise, Lacus and Kira were second. In another poll from the same site, Lacus was voted as the most popular princess from the entire franchise. She was also second in a poll which asked fans what female characters from Gundam SEED and Gundam SEED Destiny would they want to see in swimming suit, as well as another one in wedding dress from the Gundam franchise. Two other polls asked fans what was the most memorable characters from Gundam SEED and from Gundam SEED Destiny; Lacus was sixth in the former and fifth in the latter. In the 2007 Seiyu Awards, Rie Tanaka was a nominee in the category "Best Actresses in supporting roles" for her portrayal as Lacus in the Gundam SEED Destiny OVA, but lost to Ami Koshimizu and Yuko Goto.

The character has also received comments by publications for manga, anime and other media. When Gundam SEED was during its first episodes in Japan, Ever Cheung from Animefringe wondered about the future regarding Lacus and Kira as he noticed the two about to embrace in the anime's opening theme. He commented if his doubts may be right, he would find the story more interesting that he thought. Kim Wolstenholme from Mania Entertainment liked Lacus's introduction to the series as it added tension to it the friendship between Kira and Athrun. Kim noted that while Lacus and Athrun were engaged, he wondered how Lacus and Kira started relating in the series. Ross Liversidge from UK Anime Network stated he did not expect Lacus's faction entrance to the war in the last episodes from Gundam SEED as it emphasized the disasters happening within the series. Wolstenholme liked how Lacus started to take place in the war as it contrasted her actions in the series' first episodes, while also delivering surprising revelations. Moreover, Chris Beverdige, also writing for Mania, found Lacus' development throughout these episodes interesting and at the same time comical due to the design of her ship and how it is decorated by the Haros she possesses. While reviewing Gundam SEED Destiny, Liversidge stated that Lacus had become "a cult" within the series' setting due to how besides being pop-idol, she is backed up by a large number of soldiers. Lacus' public appearance in the series to reveal that Meer Campbell was impersonating her and state her true intentions was also called "totally mesmerising" by Liversidge. Chantal Strand was praised for her performance as both Lacus's and Meer's English voice actress by Anime News Network writer Theron Martin for giving them quality distinct from the original Japanese version despite finding it varying at some points.
