= List of Gundam manga and novels =

This is a list of Gundam manga and novels that are set in the Gundam anime metaseries.

== Mobile Suit Gundam (Universal Century) ==
=== Manga/novels/photo-novels ===
- 10 MINUTES WAR U.C. 0079
- Advance of Zeta Mace of Judgment
- Advance of Zeta Re-Boot: Gundam Inle – Black Rabbit Had a Dream
- Advance of Zeta: The Flag of Titans
- Advance of Zeta: The Traitor to Destiny
- Apartment of Gundam
- Char's Daily Life
- Developers: Mobile Suit Gundam Before the One Year War
- Double-Fake: Under the Gundam (Double-Fake: Under the Gundam, 1989) – by Yuji Ushida; a side-story that focuses on a decoy operation, launched by Char, in U.C.0090
- Double-Fake: Under the Gundam Reprise
- Enhanced Human Tale: Another Z Gundam Story
- Enhanced Human Tale: MAD WANG 1160
- GREAT ADVENTURE OF GUNDAM
- Go Ahead!! (Another War in UC 0044)
- Go! Go! Our V Gundam!!
- Gun-Neta Championship
- Gundam 0079 – 31.12. Decision
- Gundam 0079 – Nightmare of Solomon
- Gundam Legacy
- Gundam Pilot Series of Biographies: The Brave Soldiers in the Sky
- Gundam System of People
- Gundam Unicorn Ace: Full Frontal's Counterattack
- Gundam collection of short stories
- Gundam: Char's Deleted Affair [C.D.A] ~ Portrait of Young Comet
- Haman-San's Axis
- Hit-Out
- Rhapsody of Z
- I Live Gundam UC
- I see! Proverbs Gundam-san
- IRON HEART
- Iron Acguy
- Iron Maiden
- Jupiter (Zeus) in Operation Titan U.C. 0083
- Jupiter Mirage
- MSV-R: The Return of Johnny Ridden
- Magical Ensign Blaster Mari
- Mobile Suit Acguy – MSM 04
- Mobile Suit Collection Comic SECRET FORMULA
- Mobile Suit Crossbone Gundam (Kidou Senshi Crossbone Gundam, 1994–1997) – by Yoshiyuki Tomino, Yuichi Hasegawa. The sequel to the movie, Gundam F91,
- Mobile Suit Crossbone Gundam: Dust
- Mobile Suit Crossbone Gundam: Ghost
- Mobile Suit Crossbone Gundam: Skull Heart
- Mobile Suit Crossbone Gundam: Steel 7
- Mobile Suit Crossbone Gundam: Love & Piece
- Mobile Suit Crossbone Gundam Seerauber
- Mobile Suit Dog Gundam: Battles on Earth
- Mobile Suit Fat Gundam
- Mobile Suit Gundam (Kidou Senshi Gundam, 1979–1982) – by Yu Okazaki. The manga adaptation of the original series and movie.
- Mobile Suit Gundam (Adventure King Edition)
- Mobile Suit Gundam – Acguy: 2250 Miles Across North America
- Mobile Suit Gundam – Anaheim Record
- Mobile Suit Gundam: The battle tales of Flanagan Boone
- Mobile Suit Gundam – Day after Tomorrow: Kai Shiden's Memory
- Mobile Suit Gundam – Vanishing Machine
- Mobile Suit Gundam – Zeon MS Boys: The War of Independence
- Mobile Suit Gundam 0079 (1992–1995) – by Kazuhisa Kondo, a later adaptation of the original series
- Mobile Suit Gundam 0080 Visual Comic
- Mobile Suit Gundam 0080: War in the Pocket (Kidou Senshi Gundam 0080: Pocket no Naka no Sensou, 1989) – by Shigeto Ikehara; manga adaptation of the OVA series
- Mobile Suit Gundam 0080 – War in the Pocket (TAMAKOSHI Hiroyuki)
- Mobile Suit Gundam 0083 Rebellion – reboot story from anime
- Mobile Suit Gundam 0083: Hero of Stardust
- Mobile Suit Gundam 0083: Stardust Memory (Kidou Senshi Gundam 0083: Stardust Memory, 1992) – by Mitsuru Kadoya; manga adaptation of the OVA series
- Mobile Suit Gundam 0084: Psi-trailing
- Mobile Suit Gundam 0099: Moon Crisis Side Story: Highlanders
- Mobile Suit Gundam 4-koma Saizensen
- Mobile Suit Gundam Aggressor – manga side story
- Mobile Suit Gundam Aishim
- Mobile Suit Gundam Almarya
- Mobile Suit Gundam Battlefield Record U.C. 0081 – The Wrath of Varuna
- Mobile Suit Gundam Card Builder
- Mobile Suit Gundam Climax U.C.: The Bonds of the Bloodline
- Mobile Suit Gundam Explosion
- Mobile Suit Gundam F90
- Mobile Suit Gundam F90 (Kanda Masahiro)
- Mobile Suit Gundam F90: Fastest Formula
- Mobile Suit Gundam F90: Cluster
- Mobile Suit Gundam – Formula Wars 0122
- Mobile Suit Gundam F91 (Kidou Senshi Gundam F91, 1991) – by Daisuke Inoue; manga adaptation of the original movie
- Mobile Suit Gundam F91 Prequel
- Mobile Suit Gundam F91 Eternal Wind
- Mobile Suit Gundam Far East Japan
- Mobile Suit Gundam Gaiden: Legend of the G
- Mobile Suit Gundam Ground Zero Rise From The Ashes
- Mobile Suit Gundam Katana
- Mobile Suit Gundam MS IGLOO (Kidou Senshi Gundam MS IGLOO: Ichinen Sensou Hiroku, 2005–) – by MEIMU; manga adaptation of CGI series
- Mobile Suit Gundam MS IGLOO 2: The Gravity Front
- Mobile Suit Gundam MS IGLOO 603
- Mobile Suit Gundam MS IGLOO Apocalypse 0079
- Mobile Suit Gundam MSV Battle Chronicle Johnny Ridden
- Mobile Suit Gundam MSV-R Legend of the Universal Century Heroes: Rainbow's Shin Matsunaga
- Mobile Suit Gundam Narrative
- Mobile Suit Gundam New Revival of Zeon
- Mobile Suit Gundam Operation Troy
- Mobile Suit Gundam Program Master
- Mobile Suit Gundam REON
- Mobile Suit Gundam Saigon 0081 – Side Story in set after two years end
- Mobile Suit Gundam Side Story: Hidden Shadow G – Set in Alternative Universal Century
- Mobile Suit Gundam Side Story: Missing Link
- Mobile Suit Gundam Side Story: Space, To the End of a Flash (Kidou Senshi Gundam: Uchu, Senkou no Hate ni, 2003) – by Tomohiro Chiba (Story), Masato Natsumoto (Illustration).
- Mobile Suit Gundam Side Story: The Blue Destiny (Kidou Senshi Gundam Gaiden: The Blue Destiny, 1997) – by Mizuho Takayama. A manga retelling of the three Blue Destiny Sega Saturn games.
- Mobile Suit Gundam Silhouette Formula 91 in UC 0123
- Mobile Suit Gundam The MSV: The Mobile Suit Variations
- Mobile Suit Gundam The Plot to Assassinate Gihren
- Mobile Suit Gundam Thunderbolt
- Mobile Suit Gundam Thunderbolt Side Story
- Mobile Suit Gundam Thunderbolt Side Story: Sean The Sand Rat
- Mobile Suit Gundam Twilight Axis
- Mobile Suit Gundam U.C. 0094: Across The Sky – Set in one year after "Char Rebellion" conflict
- Mobile Suit Gundam U.C. 0096: Last Sun
- Mobile Suit Gundam U.C. Hard graph: IRON MUSTANG
- Mobile Suit Gundam UC MSV Kusabi
- Mobile Suit Gundam UC: The Man Who Could Not Ride the Rainbow
- Mobile Suit Gundam Unicorn – Bande Dessinee
- Mobile Suit Gundam Unicorn – Bande Dessinee Episode: 0
- Mobile Suit Gundam Unicorn 4-koma
- Mobile Suit Gundam Unicorn Testament
- Mobile Suit Gundam Unicorn The Truth of E.F.F.
- Mobile Suit Gundam Unicorn: The Noble Shroud
- Mobile Suit Gundam Walpurgis
- Mobile Suit Gundam Walpurgis EVE – The Night Before the Awakening
- Mobile Suit Gundam ZZ
- Mobile Suit Gundam ZZ Side Story: Mirage of Zeon
- Mobile Suit Gundam Zero Old Zakus
- Mobile Suit Zeta Gundam
- Mobile Suit Gundam in UC 0099: Moon Crisis
- Mobile Suit Gundam the 08th MS Team U.C.0079 + α Tribute
- Mobile Suit Gundam: Ecole du Ciel (Kidou Senshi Gundam Ecole du Ciel: Tenku no Gakko, 2002 – ) – by Haruhiko Mikimoto. French for School Of The Sky, it takes place during the early wars, where a young girl struggles to come to grips with her identity, as she enrolls in a Federation school, previously as a Zeon.
- Mobile Suit Gundam – U.C. War Chronicle Memories of Char Aznable
- Mobile Suit Gundam-san A 4-koma style parody of the original Mobile Suit Gundam; Being adopted into an anime.
- Mobile Suit Gundam: After Jaburo
- Mobile Suit Gundam: Char's Counterattack (Kidou Senshi Gundam: Gyakushuu no Char, 1987) – by Toshiya Murakami. The manga adaptation of the original movie
- Mobile Suit Gundam: Char's Counterattack – Beltorchika's Children
- Mobile Suit Gundam: Char's Counterattack – Beyond the Time
- Mobile Suit Gundam: Dining Table of G
- Mobile Suit Gundam: Hunter of Black Clothes
- Mobile Suit Gundam: Hybrid 4-Frame Comic Strip Great War Line
- Mobile Suit Gundam: Ixtab, Goddess of the Fallen Soldiers
- Mobile Suit Gundam: Lost War Chronicles
- Mobile Suit Gundam: MS Generation
- Mobile Suit Gundam: Outer Gundam
- Mobile Suit Gundam: Principality of Zeon Military Preparatory School
- Mobile Suit Gundam: Record of MS Wars
- Mobile Suit Gundam: Record of MS Wars II
- Mobile Suit Gundam: Super Dad Dozle – False War Story
- Mobile Suit Gundam: The Legend of Heroes
- Mobile Suit Gundam: The Light of A Baoa Qu
- Mobile Suit Gundam: The Nameless Battlefield
- Mobile Suit Gundam: The Origin (Kidou Senshi Gundam The Origin, 2002–2011) – by Yoshikazu Yasuhiko. The second, broader manga adaptation, which follows the same storyline, but with different details
- Mobile Suit Gundam: The Origin – Amuro 0082 – In three years since after end war
- Mobile Suit Gundam: The Origin – Casval 0057
- Mobile Suit Gundam: The Origin – On the Eve
- Mobile Suit Gundam: The Origin Artesia 0083
- Mobile Suit Gundam: The Origin MSD: Cucuruz Doan's Island
- Mobile Suit Gundam: The Revival of Zeon
- Mobile Suit Gundam: We're Federation Hooligans!!
- Mobile Suit Gundam: time capsule from 1-chome
- Mobile Suit Moon Gundam
- Mobile Suit O Gundam: Newtype's Light
- Mobile Suit Rhapsody: The Zadis Family Episode
- Mobile Suit V Gundam Project Exodus
- Mobile Suit Variations: Ace Pilot Story
- Mobile Suit Victory Gundam (Kidou Senshi V Gundam, 1993–1994) – by Toshiya Iwamura; manga adaptation of the original series
- Mobile Suit Victory Gundam Outside Story
- Mobile Suit Victory Gundam Side Story: Letters from Odelo Henrik
- Mobile Suit Vor!!
- Mobile Suit Vs. Giant God of Legend: Gigantis' Counterattack
- Mobile Suit Z Gundam II Lovers
- Mobile Suit Z Gundam III Love is the Pulse of the Stars
- Mobile Suit Gundam ZZ (Kidou Senshi Gundam ZZ, 1986–1987) – by Toshiya Murakami; manga adaptation of the original series
- Mobile Suit ZZ Gundam The Senility of Char
- Mobile Suit Zeta Gundam (Kidou Senshi Z Gundam, 1985–1986) – by Kazuhisa Kondo; manga adaptation of the original series
- Mobile Suit Zeta Gundam 1/2 UC 0087: Another Story
- Mobile Suit Zeta Gundam Define – a reboot story from same anime use
- Mobile Suit Zeta Gundam Heir to the Stars
- Mobile Suit Zeta Gundam Sayonara
- Mobile Suit Zeta Gundam: Day After Tomorrow – From Kai Shiden's Report
- Moon Rain
- My First Triumph: A Memory of Emma Sheen
- Newtype War Chronicles
- Nightmare of Solomon
- One Day: Haman's Deleted Affair
- Operation Buran U.C. 0079
- Ore wa Nama Gundam
- PILLOW TALK GUNDAM NIGHT=HAWKS!
- Plamo Boy and Pretty Girl – Mizuo and Jena's One Year War
- Sarah Zabiarov – The White Knight of the Round Table
- Shuuichi Ikeda's Three Times Faster!! There goes Char! Journal of Investigations of the Figures behind Gundam
- Side Operation of the Zeon U.C. 0092
- Side Story of Gundam Zeta
- South Indian Ocean waves U.C. 0093
- Stampede: The Story of Professor Minovsky
- The Dog of War U.C. 0092
- Tony Takezaki no Saku Saku Daisaku Sen
- Tony Takezaki presents GUNDAM manga – manga gag parody from first anime

=== Novels/photo novels ===
- MSV (Mobile Suit Variation)
- MS-X (Mobile Suit X)
- M-MSV (Kunio Okawara Collection)
- MSV90
- Advance of Zeta The Traitor to Destiny Extra Compilation: Mace of Judgment
- Advance of Zeta: Blue Wings of the AEUG
- Advance of Zeta: The Traitor to Destiny
- Anaheim Laboratory Log
- Char Aznable Biography – Locus of Red Comet
- For the Barrel
- G-Saviour
- Gaia Gear (1987–1989) – by Yoshiyuki Tomino; an original side story, set in the Alternative U.C.0200s, where an anti-Federation group creates a clone of Char to battle Manhunter
- Gundam Anaheim Journal U.C. 0083–0099
- Gundam MS Graphica
- Gundam Novels – The soldier which becomes the spark
- Gundam Sentinel (Gundam Sentinel: Alice no Zange, 1988–1990) – by Masaya Takahashi
- Mobile Suit Gundam ZZ Side Story: Thoughts of a Dying Atheist
- Gundam Wars Series
- Look for Avenir
- Secret Rendezvous: Amuro and Lalah
- Mobile Suit Gundam
- Mobile Suit Gundam – Burning Pursuit
- Mobile Suit Gundam 0080: War in the Pocket MSV
- Mobile Suit Gundam 0080: War in the Pocket Chris Dreams
- Mobile Suit Gundam 0080: War in the Pocket
- Mobile Suit Gundam 0083: Stardust Memory
- Mobile Suit Gundam 0087: Jerid Sortie Order
- Mobile Suit Gundam Char's Return
- Mobile Suit Gundam F91 Crossbone Vanguard
- Mobile Suit Gundam Last Red Comet
- Mobile Suit Gundam MSV-R The Troublemakers
- Mobile Suit Gundam Narrative
- Mobile Suit Gundam Secret Weapons Phantom Bullets
- Mobile Suit Gundam Side Story: At the Site of the Fallen Colony
- Mobile Suit Gundam Twilight Axis
- Mobile Suit Gundam U.C. Hard Graph: Earth Federation Forces
- Mobile Suit Gundam UC: Phoenix Hunting
- Mobile Suit Gundam UC: The War After the War
- Mobile Suit Gundam Unicorn (2001–2009) – by Haruyoshi Fukui. The story is set in U.C. 0096 and depicts the journey of Banagher Links and his RX-0 Gundam Unicorn.
- Mobile Suit Gundam ZZ
- Mobile Suit Gundam: Awakening, Escalation, Confrontation (Kidou Senshi Gundam, 1979–1981) – by Yoshiyuki Tomino. The novels follow an alternative plot line of Mobile Suit Gundam.
- Mobile Suit Gundam: Char's Counterattack – Beltorchika's Children
- Mobile Suit Gundam: Char's Counterattack – High Streamer
- Mobile Suit Gundam: Hathaway's Flash (Kidou Senshi Gundam: Senkou no Hathaway, 1989) – by Yoshiyuki Tomino; the story of Hathaway, Bright Noah's son
- Mobile Suit Gundam: Secret Rendezvous
- Mobile Suit Gundam: The 08th MS Team (Kidou Senshi Gundam: Dai 08 MS Shoutai, 1999) – by Ichiro Okochi; novel adaptation of the original series
- Mobile Suit Gundam: The Blazing Shadow
- Mobile Suit Gundam: Zeonic Front 0079
- Mobile Suit Victory Gundam
- Mobile Suit War Chronicles Side Story – Born to be Wild Again: Reborn Warrior
- Mobile Suit Zeta Gundam
- Mobile Suit Zeta Gundam: Four Story – And to a soldier...
- Original Gundam Story: Inner Gundam Space of Ageta
- THE FIRST STEP
- The 08th MS Team Side Story: Trivial Operation
- The Star of Zeon – Mobile Suit in Action
- Top Gundam
- Tyrant Sword of Neofalia

== Mobile Fighter G Gundam (Future Century) ==
=== Manga ===
- Mobile Fighter G Gundam – manga adaptation of the original series
- Go For it Domon! Gundam Party
- Mobile Fighter G Gundam Side Story: Flying Dragon Legend
- Mobile Fighter G Gundam Side Story: Tower Of Death
- Mobile Fighter G Gundam: Mask Gundam Challenge
- Mobile Fighter G Gundam The Next Generation – One-Shot sequel set after end anime series
- Mobile Fighter G Gundam: 7th Fight – Manga Prequel set in F.C 32 before main story anime begins, main character youth name is Master Asia or real name Shuji Kurosu the first member "Shuttle Alliance" with his comrade the first name title "King of Heart".
- Mobile Fighter G Gundam: Edge Of Gunsmoke
- Mobile Fighter G Gundam: Revenge of J Gundam
- Mobile Fighter G Gundam Side Story: Farewell
- Good luck, Domon!
- Super-Class! Mobile Fighter G Gundam
- Super-Class! Mobile Fighter G Gundam: Erupting Neo Hong Kong!
- Super-Class! Mobile Fighter G Gundam: Shinjuku/Undefeated of the East!
- Super-Class! Mobile Fighter G Gundam: The Final Battle

=== Novels ===
- Mobile Fighter G Gundam
- Mobile Fighter G Gundam Side Story: The East is Burning Red: Heaven and Earth Startled
- Mobile Fighter G Gundam Side Story: The East is Burning Red: Hero Reborn
- Mobile Fighter G Gundam Side Story: The East is Burning Red: New Legend of the Three Heroes ~Jewel of the Orient~

== Mobile Suit Gundam Wing (After Colony) ==
=== Manga ===
- Mobile Suit Gundam Wing: Episode Zero – Set before the original TV series, the series is a prequel telling the stories of five youths boys who become pilots Gundam pilots and Relena Darlian origin.
- New Mobile Report Gundam Wing – manga adaptation of the original series
- New Mobile Report Gundam Wing Dual Story: G-Unit (Shin Kidou Senki Gundam W Dual Story: G-UNIT, 1997) – by Kōichi Tokita.
- New Mobile Report Gundam Wing: Endless Waltz (Shin Kidou Senki Gundam W: Endless Waltz, 1998) – by Kōichi Tokita; manga adaptation of the original OVA and movie
- New Mobile Report Gundam Wing: Ground Zero
- New Mobile Report Gundam Wing: Blind Target
- New Mobile Report Gundam Wing: Battlefield of Pacifists
- New Mobile Report Gundam Wing Sidestory: Tiel's Impulse
- New Mobile Report Gundam Wing Endless Waltz: Glory of the Losers – a reboot story, retelling the events of the series
- New Mobile Report Gundam Wing Dual Story: G-Unit Operation Galiarest (Shin Kidou Senki Gundam W Dual Story: G-UNIT Operation Galiarest, 2019) – by Kōichi Tokita.

=== Novels ===
- New Mobile Report Gundam Wing
- New Mobile Report Gundam Wing: Frozen Teardrop (Shin Kidou Senki Gundam W: Frozen Teardrop, 2010-?) – by Katsuyuki Sumizawa. A novel featuring new and old characters in a new timeline.
- New Mobile Report Gundam Wing Side Story: A Scythe In My Right Hand, You In My Left
- New Mobile Report Gundam Wing Perfect Album Bom-Bom Comic
- Gundam Wing Technical Manual
- Encyclopedia of Gundam Wing

== After War Gundam X (After War) ==
=== Manga ===
- After War Gundam X (Kidou Shin Seiki Gundam X, 1996–1997) – manga adaptation of the series; by Koichi Tokita
- After War Gundam X NEXT PROLOGUE – one shot in sequel set after end first anime, Garrod and Tiffa now living happy life.
- After War Gundam X: Newtype Warrior Jamil Neate – one shot prequel set on A.W
- After War Gundam X: Under the Moonlight (Kidou Shin Seiki Gundam X: Under The Moonlight, 2004 – ) – manga by Yutaka Akatsu (Story), Chitose Oshima (Illustration)
- After War Gundam X: Flash

=== Novel ===
- After War Gundam X Hyper Guide

== Turn A Gundam (Correct Century (Seireki)) ==
=== Manga ===
- ∀ Gundam (1999–2000) – 2-volume manga adaptation of the series for children; by Koichi Tokita
- ∀ Gundam (1999–2000) – 5-volume manga adaptation for adults; by Atsushi Souga
- ∀ Gundam: Wind of the Moon (2003) – a prequel manga by character designer, Akira Yasuda
- ∀ Gundam: Wind of the Moon – Loran's Day (2004) – a bonus chapter for the prequel manga by character designer, Akira Yasuda

=== Novels ===
- ∀ Gundam (2000) – light novel adaptation written by Shigeru Sato
- ∀ Gundam: Episodes (2000) – a collection of new side stories collected as the bonus 6th volume of the light novel adaptation, by Shigeru Sato
- ∀ Gundam (2000) – adult novel adaptation written by Harutoshi Fukui

== Mobile Suit Gundam SEED (Cosmic Era) ==
=== Manga ===
- Mobile Suit Gundam SEED – manga adaptation of the series for teens; by Masatsugu Iwase
- Mobile Suit Gundam SEED Eclipse
- Mobile Suit Gundam SEED – Fierce fight of Kira and Athrun
- Mobile Suit Gundam SEED Astray – side story set in the same timeline frame as the first series, tells the story of three abandoned Orb prototypes called Gundam-type Astray series; manga by Tomohiro Chiba (story), Koichi Tokita (illustration)
- Mobile Suit Gundam SEED Destiny – manga adaptation of the series for teens; by Masatsugu Iwase
- Mobile Suit Gundam SEED Destiny (Mizuho Takayama)
- Mobile Suit Gundam SEED Destiny: The Edge – the events of the series from Athrun Zala's point of view; by Chimaki Kuori
- Mobile Suit Gundam SEED Problem Solvers! Shinn & Impulse
- Mobile Suit Gundam SEED Destiny Astray a young photojournalist uses the next generation Astray to show the truth to the world; by Tomohiro Chiba (story), Koichi Tokita (illustration)
- Mobile Suit Gundam SEED C.E. 73 Δ Astray – follows the story of a team dispatched from Mars to Earth; by Tomohiro Chiba (story), Koichi Tokita (illustration)
- Mobile Suit Gundam SEED ASTRAY MSV
- Mobile Suit Gundam SEED ASTRAY R
- Mobile Suit Gundam SEED C.E. 73: STARGAZER
- Mobile Suit Gundam SEED Frame Astrays
- Mobile Suit Gundam SEED MSV: Sakura Burst and the White Whale
- Mobile Suit Gundam SEED MSV: The Blooming of Housenka on the Battlefield
- Mobile Suit Gundam SEED Re:
- Mobile Suit Gundam SEED X ASTRAY
- Mobile Suit Gundam SEED featuring SUIT CD
- Mobile Suit Gundam SEED VS ASTRAY – Special Archive: Beginning of the End
- Mobile Suit Gundam SEED ASTRAY Princess of the Sky
- Mobile Suit Gundam SEED FREEDOM ASTRAY
- Mobile Suit Gundam SEED: Seed Club 4Koma

=== Novels ===
- Mobile Suit Gundam SEED
- Mobile Suit Gundam SEED Destiny
- Mobile Suit Gundam SEED Freedom
- Mobile Suit Gundam SEED MSV
- Mobile Suit Gundam SEED MSV: Battlefield Record
- Mobile Suit Gundam SEED Destiny MSV
- Mobile Suit Gundam SEED Freedom MSV
- Mobile Suit Gundam SEED ASTRAY (novel)
- Mobile Suit Gundam SEED ASTRAY B
- Mobile Suit Gundam SEED Destiny Astray (Novel)
- Mobile Suit Gundam SEED C.E. 73 STARGAZER: Phantom Pain Report
- Mobile Suit Gundam SEED DESTINY ASTRAY
- Mobile Suit Gundam SEED DESTINY ASTRAY B
- Mobile Suit Gundam SEED DESTINY ASTRAY R
- Mobile Suit Gundam SEED VS ASTRAY
- Mobile Suit Gundam SEED Freedom: Escape for Two
- Mobile Suit Gundam SEED Freedom: Moonlight Valkyrie
- Mobile Suit Gundam SEED Freedom: Neumann's Voyage Log
- Mobile Suit Gundam SEED Freedom: After Cut Postcards

== Mobile Suit Gundam 00 (Anno Domini) ==
=== Manga ===
- Gundam 00 – Crossword Puzzle Comic Characters Black!
- Mobile Suit Gundam 00 (Kidou Senshi Gundam 00, 2007 – )
- Mobile Suit Gundam 00 – A wakening of the Trailblazer'
- Mobile Suit Gundam 00 2nd Season
- Mobile Suit Gundam 00 Dear Meisters
- Mobile Suit Gundam 00: Blue Memories
- Mobile Suit Gundam 00: Bonds
- Mobile Suit Gundam 00: In Those Days
- Mobile Suit Gundam 00F
- Mobile Suit Gundam 00I
- Mobile Suit Gundam 00I 2314

=== Novels ===
- Mobile Suit Gundam 00
- Mobile Suit Gundam 00 – A wakening of the Trailblazer
- Mobile Suit Gundam 00 Second Season
- Mobile Suit Gundam 00N
- Mobile Suit Gundam 00P
- Mobile Suit Gundam 00V
- Mobile Suit Gundam 00V Battlefield Record

== Mobile Suit Gundam AGE (Advanced Generation) ==
=== Manga ===
- Mobile Suit Gundam AGE Climax Hero – reimagined
- Mobile Suit Gundam AGE Final Evolution – adaptation manga in Kio/Three Generation Arc to fourth part arc as final anime series
- Mobile Suit Gundam AGE First Evolution – adaptation Flit Arc manga from anime first part
- Mobile Suit Gundam AGE Second Evolution manga adaptation in second anime part from Asemu arc
- Mobile Suit Gundam AGE: Memories of Sid – side story of second arc continuity where Asemu Asuno still members Federation force soldier before he become captain pirates
- Mobile Suit Gundam AGE: Story of the Beginning – one-shot manga of anime series before begin; however, this story is different detail.
- Mobile Suit Gundam AGE: Treasure Star – side story of first arc of from main timelines

=== Novels ===
- Mobile Suit Gundam AGE – novel adaptation from of anime with 4 arc along new material storyline, character and variants Mobile Suit was never seen.
- Mobile Suit Gundam AGE [EXA-LOG] – a Mobile Suit Variations (MSV) cross the three generations of main story, including after the ending of the TV anime series including new Gundam AGE 2, Gundam AGE 3 Variants Federation Mobile Suit next-line weapon, Vagan next development and Bisdian another variant Mobile Suit, Civilians Mobile Suit later reveal Legendary Mobile Suit "The Gundam" of origin Asuno Family Mobile Suit.
- Mobile Suit Gundam AGE [Unknown Soldiers] – another Mobile Suit Variantions (MSV) same three generations of main story

== Gundam Reconguista in G (Regild Century) ==
=== Manga ===
- Gundam Reconguista in G

=== Novels ===
- G-Laboratory (Ippei Gyoubu Design Works)

== Mobile Suit Gundam: Iron-Blooded Orphans (Post Disaster) ==
=== Manga ===
- Mobile Suit Gundam: Iron-Blooded Orphans (2015–2022) – adaptation manga from anime two seasons.
- Mobile Suit Gundam: Iron-Blooded Orphans: Steel Moon – manga side story from main timelines in stories about the character avenger young man became mercenary find a mysterious Gundam-Frame who caused killed his family.

=== Novel ===
- Mobile Suit Gundam: Iron-Blooded Orphans: MSV

== Mobile Suit Gundam: The Witch From Mercury (Ad Stella) ==
=== Manga ===
- Mobile Suit Gundam: The Witch From Mercury – Vanadis Heart
- Mobile Suit Gundam: The Witch From Mercury – Frontiers in Glory Days

=== Novel ===
- Mobile Suit Gundam: The Witch From Mercury

== Gunpla Builders Beginning G ==
=== Manga ===
- Model Suit Gunpla Builders A – Manga adaptation from OVA.
- Model Suit Gunpla Builders Beginning D

=== Novels ===
- Model Suit Gunpla Builders Beginning J
- Model Suit Gunpla Builders Beginning D

== Gundam Build Fighters/Gundam Build Diver ==
=== Manga ===
- Gundam Build Fighters Amazing
- Gundam Build Fighters Amazing Ready
- Gundam Build Fighters Amazing Try
- Gundam Build Fighters Plamo Diver: Kit & Built
- Gundam Build Divers Break
- Gundam Build Diver Rize

=== Novels ===
- Gundam Build Fighters – novelization adaptation from main anime stories
- Gundam Build Fighters Document – photonovel stories as prequel series about Tatsuya Yuuki become as main character
- Gundam Build Fighters Honoo – photonovel side story from first main anime, storyline about character
- Gundam Build Fighters Honoo Try
- Gundam Build Divers Genius Head Line
- Gundam Build Divers GBWC
- Hobby Hobby Imaging Builders
- Hobby Hobby Imaging Builders Ver.C.Z
- Hobby Hobby Imaging Builders Ver.MODELERS

== Video game originated works ==
Games	Book title	Book type
Mobile Suit Gundam Side Story	Mobile Suit Gundam: Blue Destiny	Comic
Gundam Side Story: Rise from the Ashes	機動戦士ガンダム外伝―コロニーの落ちた地で…〈上〉角川スニーカー文庫 機動戦士ガンダム外伝―コロニーの落ちた地で…〈下〉角川スニーカー文庫	Novel
Mobile Suit Gundam: Lost War Chronicles	機動戦士ガンダム戦記―Lost War Chronicles〈1〉角川スニーカー文庫 機動戦士ガンダム戦記―Lost War Chronicles〈2〉角川スニーカー文庫	Novel
Mobile Suit Gundam: Zeonic Front	ZEONIC FRONT―機動戦士ガンダム0079〈1〉角川スニーカー文庫; ZEONIC FRONT―機動戦士ガンダム0079〈2〉角川スニーカー文庫	Novel
Mobile Suit Gundam Battle Operation Code Fairy	機動戦士ガンダム バトルオペレーション コード・フェアリー	Comic

== Other ==
- Mobile Suit Gundam Alive (2006–2007) – An original Gundam story set in the modern day a connect between 21st and 24st the first multiverse series; by Mizuho Takayama
- Fusion Clashes: Gundam Battle-Rave – (2008–2009) A is a manga released to promote the eponymous collectible card game.
- Gundam EXA – (2011–2014) An original Gundam story set in the far future where humanity has now have highly advanced technology. However, the human population is decreasing and it seems that they're on their way to extinction. A one young man is name Leos Alloy who join "Jupiter X" become "G-Diver" pilot travel with General Answer of Gundam Universe World between Universal Century and Alternate Universe.
- Gundam EXA VS – (2014–2017) A sequel from Gundam EXA set in one year after events main story, Leos Alloy and Sthesia Awar was still continue G-diver duty looking next step mission but it was encounters a mystery group wanted challenge of fighting.
- Mobile War History Gundam Burai (2019–2023) – An original Gundam story that takes place in its own continuity; set in an alternate history Japan during a fictional Tenpō (天法, lit. heaven law) Era where giant mechs, known as Tetsuki (鉄機(てっき), lit. iron machine), were used to fight wars until a shogunate by the fictional Tokugō house (徳轟(とくごう)) put a stop to the war and established a martial arts contest, the Sankin Kōtai (参勤鋼對(さんきんこうたい), lit. attendance steel match), where the winners of the contest would see their wishes granted.
- Despair Memory Gundam Sequel (2022–present) – An original work set after a great war which cost humanity half of its population, after which the Gundams that helped save the Earth were destroyed and the newtypes who piloted them were rounded up and slaughtered. Years later, in a far off space colony, the assassin Bloody Kaoris is a "Neos", a person with special powers.
- Mobile Suit Gundam N-Extreme (2022–present) – A new original work as successor of Gundam EXA, manga set in nearly future real worlds where the four youth boy/man was summoning came to world later chosen become Gundams pilots into Gundam world to travel for restore timeline universe.
- Mobile Suit Gundam Eight (2025–present) – A new original Gundam manga Set in the new Eternal Calendar timeline, the story will center on the last 258 human survivors of a biotechnological apocalypse under attacking by a creature lifeform called Kaiju.

=== Series about Gundam modeling simulation battles ===
These series are about characters building their own Gundam models, or Gunpla, and having them battle in a simulation arena later success became made new anime first Gunpla series Model Suit Gunpla Builders Beginning G, Gundam Build Fighters, Gundam Build Divers.

- Plamo-Kyoshiro (プラモ狂四郎, Puramokyōshirō)(1982–1986)
  - A spinoff series mainly based on the models of the first Gundam series along with its Mobile Suit Variation series. It was the first Gundam series about battling with Gunpla, rather than actual Mobile Suits. The Gundams in the series are both modifications of existing models and brand-new ones, like the PF-78-1 Perfect Gundam, Red Warrior, and Musha Gundam, which were endorsed by Bandai and later released as official models and figures, and also used as units featured in various games. The series featured the idea, later used in Mobile Fighter G Gundam, of the pilot's emotions being reflected by the movements of the Gundam unit. Various series using the same basic idea were published, including the sequels:
    - Shin Plamo-Kyoshiro
    - Cho-Senshi Gundam Boy
    - Gunpla Koshien
    - Plamo-Wars (1994–1998)
    - Gunpla Musashi
    - Gunpla Extreme

=== Series Gundam with non-story war mecha about history and gunpla as slice of life story ===
- Gundam Sousei
- Gundam Otaku Girl
- Two Girls in Love with High Grade Model Kits
- Diorama Daisakusn
- Gundam-kei no Hitobito
