= Mobile Suit Gundam Alive =

Japanese manga series

- vol 1 manga cover

機動戦士ガンダムALIVE (Kidō Senshi Gandamu ALIVE)
- Genre: Mecha; Military science fiction
- Created by: Hajime Yatate; Yoshiyuki Tomino
- Manga
- Written by: Yuka Minakawa
- Illustrated by: Mizuho Takayama
- Published by: Kodansha
- Magazine: Comic BonBon
- Original run: October 15, 2006 – November 15, 2007
- Volumes: 5

Mobile Suit Gundam Alive (機動戦士ガンダムALIVE, Kidō Senshi Gandamu ALIVE) is a Gundam comic title created by Mizuho Takayama (illustration) and Yuka Minakawa (script). It was premiered on the November 2006 issue of Comic Bom Bom. The prologue chapter Gundam ALIVE Episode 0 is published in Gundam Magazine which was bundled with the November 2006 issue of Comic Bom Bom.

This is a completely new story with no relation to previous Gundam series. Set in the 21st century (present time) with Japan as the main stage where a mysterious army has invaded with high advanced weapons called Mobile Suits, the protagonist lead stand against them with a mobile suit called "Gundam".

== Story ==
The year is 200X. A mysterious robot fell from the sky into Tokyo. The robot is called a "Mobile Suit". Meanwhile, another Mobile Suit named "Gundam" crash landed near Kurono...

== Characters ==
=== Time Ball Liberation Army ===
Main characters

Tokio Kurono (黒野時夫(くろのときお), Kurono Tokio (kuro no Tokio)
The main protagonist of the story. A student and a regular of the soccer club. Kurono has always believed that he possesses some hidden talent. He first piloted the "RX-78-2 Gundam" and Second "RX-93 Nu Gundam", later he pilots the "System-∀99 Turn A Gundam". In the beginning of the story he becomes a pilot to fend off the "MS-06 Zakus" that were chasing Aiko. He is still an amateur at piloting MS (mobile suits) and was beaten badly in his first few confrontations with the Ministry army. Currently he is undergoing MS training at the Nishimikado House. In the second battle against the "GAT-X207 Blitz Gundam", Kurono has shown Newtype abilities.
Aiko Anna Pruna (アイコ・アンナ・プルナ, Aiko An'na puruna)
A spacenoid who is a member of the Time Ball Liberation. The original pilot of the "RX-78-2 Gundam" and a pilot of the heavy fighter "G-Fighter", she eventually becomes the captain of the "SCV-70 White Base". Aiko and her brother were attacked while transporting a new MS and crash land on Earth, where she meets Kurono. Aiko was amazed at Kurono's ability to pilot the MS when he took over the controls from her. She appears to be from the future of another dimension. She was really excited when Kurono brought milk for her as she says that farming in space colonies is difficult and milk is expensive there.
Sakuya Nishimikado (西御門朔也(にしみかど さくや), Nishimikado Sakuya (Ni shimi kado sakuya)
A student in the same school Kurona attends. He is the 18th head of the Nishimikado family that has been protecting the "Gundam" for 500 years and an expert at piloting mobile suits.
The ancestor of the Nishimikado family is Morris Aluna Pruna, Aiko's brother, who also fell to Earth but wound up in a time 500 years before the events of the story. So this makes Aiko the grandaunt of Sakuya. Sakuya also pilots the Moless' "MSZ-006 Zeta Gundam", now outfitted with "Musha" armour.
Retsu Domyouji (道明寺烈(どうみょうじ れつ), Doumyōji Retsu (dō myōji retsu)
The pilot of "GF13-017NJII Shining Gundam". A childhood friend of Sakuya. A monk of the Domyouji family, he broke the rule of not fighting when he used the Shining Gundam to save Kurono.
K2 (K 2)
A member of the Organization Colony Government, serving in the Ministry of the Environment Military. Later he joined the Army Time Ball Liberation Organization. He appeared piloting a "GX-9900 Gundam X" and later pilots the MS "GX-9901-DX Gundam Double X". He and his troops descend onto Earth to pursue the Gundam. He later retrieved a H.L.V from the ocean. He is always seen with sunglasses on. His real name is ;Ardito Austin (アルディート・オースティン, Arudīto ōsutin).

=== Colonial Government Military and Ministry of Environment ===
Heinrich (ハインリヒ, Hainrihi)

A man who came to Tokio world in Episode 5 and he is the rank captain of the Ministry of the Environment's Environmental Conservation Special Task Force. He pilot of the "GAT-X105 Strike Gundam" and pilot "MA-08 Big Zam" later he pilots "JDG-OOX Devil Gundam" most dangerous machine but ultimately it was swallowed gate.

Grand (グランド, Gurando)

A man who came to Tokio world in Episode 5, and like Rosa, he is a member of the special forces. He is the pilot of "GAT-X102 Duel Gundam" pilot "GAT-X131 Calamity Gundam" later pilot "MRX-010 Psycho Gundam MK II".

Rosa (ローザ, Rōza)

A woman who came to Tokio world in Episode 5, and one of the special forces. She is the pilot of "GAT-X103 Buster Gundam" and Pilot "GAT-X303 Raider Gundam" later pilot "MRX-009 Psycho Gundam".

- Joras (ジョラス)

A man who came to Tokio world in Episode 5 and is one of the special forces he very mostly sadist, brutal.He is the pilot of the GAT-X207 Blitz Gundam later pilot GAT-X252 Forbidden Gundam.

- Young man from the special forces

The real his full name unknown the man is who came to Tokio world in Episode 5 and is one of the special forces. He is the pilot of the "GAT-X303 Aegis Gundam".

- Douglas C. Elbrus (ダグラス・C・エルブラス Dagurasu C eruburasu)

Main antagonist a true villain of story, he is the director of the Colony Ministry of Environment. His mobile suit was "ZGMF-X13A Providence Gundam" later in final battle pilot with "JDG-OOX Devil Gundam" has Devil Colony form.

- Commander (司令官 Shirei-kan)

He is a high-ranking officer in the Colony Government's regular army and K2's superior. He is optimistic about the fact that Tokio and his group only possess a small number of Mobile Suits Army. He only appears in communications with K2, so it is unknown what happened to him afterward.

=== Other characters ===
- Tokio's sister (時夫の姉) (Tokio no ane)

No name mentioned yet. After their parents died, she and her brother Tokio lived together. She got Aiko to live together with them and treats her like a family member.

- Domyouji family head (道明寺家当主) (Doumyōji-ka tōshu)

No name mentioned yet. He is Retsu Domyouji's father and the current head of the Domyouji family, the Keykeeper who has been protecting Gundam for many years.

- Yamanouchi (山之内) (Yamanouchi)

Butler of the Nishimikado family, the person who provides support for Sakuya in various aspects.

- Morris Aluna Pruna (モーリス・エルナ・プルナ) (Mōrisu Eruna puruna)

Aiko's brother who members Time Ball Liberation Army and the former pilot of the MSZ-006 Zeta Gundam. Became missing after Aiko and the Gundam was attacked by GX-9900 Gundam X in the midst of its transportation. But actually he fell into a time slip and ended up in Japan 500 years ago, he started the Nishimikado family and remained in the area. His MSZ-006 Zeta Gundam is passed down to later generations of the Nishimikado family.

== Mobile Suits and Mobile Armor ==
Many units from the previous Gundam series appeared and will appear in this series. Here is a list of the main units.

=== Gundam (Gundam-type) ===
Only 20 Original Gundams-type mobile suit unit from previous Gundam series same incarnation and same counterpart in manga ALIVE timeline universe.

- RX-78-2 Gundam (ガンダム)

The Close-Quarter Combat Gundam-type Mobile Suit from belong Time Ball Liberation Army piloted by Aiko then now Kurono. In episode 6 Aiko speak of it as a "special machine". It is revealed in episode 11 that this Gundam has some sort of Psychomu system equipped.

- RX-78-2 Gundam Real Type (ガンダム リアルタイプカラー)

The Variant machine that piloted Tokio in simulation only. This Gundam's coloring is based on the movie poster by Kunio Okawara and the plastic model released by Bandai afterwards.

- RX-93 v Gundam (Nu Gundam) (νガンダム)

The Newtype-use General-Purpose Gundam-type Mobile Suit with using all-range attack and defense use Equipment called "Fin Funnel" piloted by kurono after he retunning 24 century along them, engaging battle between special force army and gigatic Gundam-type is Devil Gundam.

- FA-93HWS ν Gundam Heavy Weapons System Type (νガンダム ヘビー・ウエポン・システム装備型)

Variant for Nu Gundam wearing Heavy Armor MS use battle three Gundams-type and Ministry corp army.

- System-∀99 ∀ Gundam (Turn A Gundam) (∀ガンダム)

The Interstellar Warfare Gundam-type Mobile Suit with Special Equipment called "Moonlight Butterfly" (月光蝶 Gekkouchou) piloted by kurono, this Gundam use for final battle for opponent is Devil Gundam in Devil Colony Form.

- MSZ-006 Zeta Gundam (Ζガンダム)

The Transformable Attack use Gundam-type MS First piloted by Moless then now Sakuya. Since the falling of the Zeta Gundam it has been passed down from generations in the Nishimikado family for 500 years. The Zeta Gundam now is clad in musha armour and has a katana as its main armament. However in episode 0 Sakuya is seen piloting the Zeta Gundam without the armour.

- GF13-017NJ Shining Gundam (シャイニングガンダム)

Close Quarters Combat Gundam-type Mobile Fighter with no weapon arms.
only used martial arts fighting style he disguise with Great Buddha it has existed since the Sengoku era fought against the Nishimikado Zeta Gundam during that 500 years. piloted by Retsu Domyouji

- RGZ-91 Re-GZ (リ・ガズィ)

Transformable Attack-Use Mobile Suit Pseudo Gundam-type only appeared episode 17 as final battle during attacking Devil Gundam and Gundam Head.

- GX-9900 Gundam X (ガンダムX)

The Satellite System Loading Gundam-type MS belong from Ministry of the Environment military equipment called "Satellite Cannon system" piloted by the K2 which he used to attack Aiko and Moless. and he appeared once in Tokio world and dueling Kurono in Gundam and heavy damage later he upgrade new appearance called Gundam X Divider.

- GX-9900-DV Gundam X Divider (ガンダムXディバイダー)

Upgrade version Original Gundam X after heavy damage by Kurono Gundam during first battle power up with Equipped Divider to be using rematches Kurono to second battle same piloted by K2.

- GX-9901-DX Gundam Double X (ガンダムダブルエックス)

The Satellite System Equipped Gundam-type MS also successor Gundam X with equipment's "Twins Satellite Cannon system" piloted by K2 after he defects joining Time Sphere Liberation Army.

- GAT-X105 Strike Gundam (ストライクガンダム)

The Multi-Mode Gundam-type MS piloted by Heinrich that appeared out of the dimensional gate with 4 other Gundams-type MS in episode 7.

- GAT-X105+AQM/E-X01 Aile Strike Gundam (アレイストライクガンダム)

A variant for Strike Gundam equipment Aile Striker packs use high mobility air combat.

- GAT-X105+AQM/E-X02 Sword Strike Gundam (ソードストライクガンダム)

Same variant wearing Strike Gundam with equipment Sword Striker packs use Close Quarter Combat.

- GAT-X102 Duel Gundam (デュエルガンダム)

The General-Purpose Gundam-type MS wearing Assault Shroud armor piloted by Grand first battle between Kurono Gundam and Retsu Shinning Gundam.

- GAT-X103 Buster Gundam (バスターガンダム)

The Artillery-use Gundam-type MS Piloted by Rosa first attacking Kurono Gundam and Retsu Shinning Gundam.

- GAT-X207 Blitz Gundam (ブリッツガンダム)

The Stealth-use Gundam-type MS Piloted by Joras first battle Kurono Gundam but prevented by Retsu Shinning Gundam who helped him his pitch.

- GAT-X303 Aegis Gundam (イージスガンダム)

The Transformable Assault Mobile Suit Gundam-type piloted by unknown aegis pilot first battle between Kurono Gundam, Restu Shinning Gundam and Sakuya Zeta Gundam.

- GAT-X131 Calamity Gundam (カラミティガンダム)

The Artillery Gundam-type Mobile Suit piloted by Grand a special forces he Appears in episode 15 and 16 along them two new Gundams.

- GAT-X252 Forbidden Gundam (フォビドゥンガンダム)

Transformable High-Speed Assault Gundam-type Mobile Suit piloted by Joras a special forces appear in 15 and 16 episode along thems.

- GAT-X370 Raider Gundam(レイダーガンダム)

Transformable Assault Gundam-type Mobile Suit Mobile Suit piloted by Rosa member special forces appear in 15 and 16 episode.

- ZGMF-X13A Providence Gundam(プロヴィデンスガンダム)

The DRAGOON-use Gundam-type Mobile Suit piloted by Douglas C. Elbrus a lead de facto use military government force into final front in battlefield, fighting between Nu Gundam later it's was destroy by Kurono Nu Gundam but it he was survive.

- MRX-009 Psycho Gundam(
- MRX-010 Psycho Gundam Mk-II (
- Ultimate Gundam(
- JDG-00X Devil Gundam(

== See also ==
- Fusion Clashes: Gundam Battle-Rave – A second multiverse set in real world called the virtual space "G Dimension" players can battle in the Machine Souls summoned with the cards contained in their "G Catapult Gear."
