= Hidetoshi Nakamura =

Japanese actor (1954-2014)

- 中村 秀利
- Born: 12 July 1954; Tokyo, Japan
- Died: 24 December 2014 (aged 60)
- Occupations: Actor; voice actor; narrator
- Years active: 1977–2014
- Agent: 81 Produce

Hidetoshi Nakamura (中村 秀利, Nakamura Hidetoshi; 12 July 1954 – 24 December 2014) was a Japanese actor, voice actor and narrator who was affiliated with 81 Produce. He died of subarachnoid hemorrhage on 24 December 2014, aged 60.

== Filmography ==
=== Television animation ===
- Dokaben (1977) (Murata)
- Combat Mecha Xabungle (1982) (Katakam Zushin)
- Mobile Suit Zeta Gundam (1985) (Buran Blutarch)
- Jushin Liger (1989) (Doll Phantom)
- Yu Yu Hakusho (1992) (Gondawara)
- Mobile Suit Victory Gundam (1993) (Tassilo Vago)
- Ping-Pong Club (1995) (Morio Tachikawa)
- After War Gundam X (1996) (Abel Bauer)
- Cowboy Bebop (1998) (Otto)
- Baki the Grappler (2001) (Captain Strydum)
- Pokémon (2001) (Dr. Shiranui)
- Requiem from the Darkness (2003) (Denzo Kusunoki)
- Rockman EXE Axess (2003) (Shademan)
- Oh My Goddess! (2005) (Almighty)
- Rockman EXE Stream (2005) (Shademan)
- Zoids: Genesis (2005) (General Jiin)
- Night Head Genesis (2006) (Kyojiro Mikuriya)
- Rental Magica (2007) (Oswald lenn Mathers)
- Corpse Princess (2008) (Sougen Takamine)
- Shangri-La (2009) (Sergei Talsian)
- To Love Ru (2008) (Gid Lucione Deviluke)
- Canaan (2009) (President of the United States)
- Motto To Love Ru (2010) (Gid Lucione Deviluke)
- Bakuman (2011) (Torishima)
- Gosick (2011) (Baron Musgrave)
- Jormungand (2012) (Col. Yosuke Hinoki)
- Danchi Tomoo (2013) (Colonel Sports)
- DokiDoki! PreCure (2013) (Seiji Yotsuba)
- JoJo's Bizarre Adventure (2013) (Messina)

=== Original video animation (OVA) ===
- Ambassador Magma (1992) (Fumiaki Asuka)
- Tristia of the Deep-Blue Sea (2004) (Arthur Griffen)
- Mobile Suit Gundam SEED C.E. 73: Stargazer (2006) (Joaquin)

=== Theatrical animation ===
- Kaiketsu Zorori (1993) (Pantsunda)
- Mobile Suit Z Gundam: A New Translation – Heirs to the Stars (2005), (Buran Blutarch)
- Mobile Suit Z Gundam 2: A New Translation – Lovers (2005) (Buran Blutarch)
- Naruto Shippuden: the Movie (2007) (Yomi)

=== Video games ===
- Super Robot Wars Alpha (2000) (Buran Blutarch, Tassilo Wago)
- The King of Fighters 2000 (2000) (Seth)
- Super Robot Wars Alpha Gaiden (2001) (Buran Blutarch)
- Shenmue II (2001) (Delin Hong)
- The King of Fighters 2001 (2001) (Seth)
- The King of Fighters 2002 (2002) (Seth)
- Mobile Suit Gundam: Encounters in Space (2003) (Shin Matsunaga)
- The King of Fighters: Maximum Impact (2004) (Seth)
- The King of Fighters: Maximum Impact 2 (2006) (Seth)
- Super Robot Wars Z (2008) (Buran Blutarch, Abel Bauer)
- Super Robot Wars V (2017) (Buran Blutarch)
- The King of Fighters All Star (2020) (Seth)

==== Unknown date ====
- Gears of War 2 (Richard Prescott) (Japanese Dub)
- Gears of War 3 (Richard Prescott) (Japanese Dub)
- Super Robot Wars series, Buran Blutarch

=== Tokusatsu ===
- Juukou B-Fighter (1995), Voice of Dangar
- B-Fighter Kabuto (1996), Voice of Zabodera
- Mahou Sentai Magiranger (2005), Voice of Samurai Shichijuurou

=== Drama CDs ===
- Ao no Kiseki series 2: Catharsis Spell, Guid

=== Dubbing roles ===
==== Film ====
- Bruce Willis
  - The Expendables (Mr. Church)
  - Fire with Fire (Mike Cella)
  - Looper (Old Joe Simmons)
  - Moonrise Kingdom (Captain Duffy Sharp)
  - A Good Day to Die Hard (John McClane)
- Willem Dafoe
  - The Life Aquatic with Steve Zissou (Klaus Daimler)
  - Inside Man (Captain John Darius)
  - Out of the Furnace (John Petty)
- Ali, Cassius Clay, Sr. (Giancarlo Esposito)
- Attack Force, Robinson (Andrew Bicknell)
- Bad Country, Jesse Weiland (Matt Dillon)
- Beverly Hills Cop III (1997 TV Asahi edition), Serge (Bronson Pinchot)
- The Big Lebowski (Blu-Ray edition), Jesus Quintana (John Turturro)
- Carlito's Way, Benny Blanco (John Leguizamo)
- Charlie and the Chocolate Factory (2008 NTV edition), Mr. Teavee (Adam Godley)
- Die Hard 2, Sergeant Oswald Cochrane (John Costelloe)
- Die Hard with a Vengeance, Karl
- Elizabeth, Monsieur de Foix (Eric Cantona)
- French Kiss, Bob (François Cluzet)
- Gone Baby Gone, Lionel McCready (Titus Welliver)
- I Still Know What You Did Last Summer, Mr. Brooks (Jeffrey Combs)
- Jack Ryan: Shadow Recruit, Thomas Harper (Kevin Costner)
- The Judge (Dwight Dickham (Billy Bob Thornton))
- Killing Me Softly, Senior Police Officer (Ian Hart)
- Knight and Day, Antonio Quintana (Jordi Mollà)
- Lawn Dogs, Morton Stockard (Christopher McDonald)
- The Long Kiss Goodnight, Timothy (Craig Bierko)
- Lucky Stars Go Places, Libbogen / Lib-Bogen (Billy Lau)
- The Man Who Cried, Dante Dominio (John Turturro)
- The Matrix Reloaded, The Merovingian (Lambert Wilson)
- The Matrix Revolutions, The Merovingian (Lambert Wilson), Deus Ex Machina (Kevin Michael Richardson)
- Monrak Transistor, Yot (Black Phomtong)
- The Mummy: Tomb of the Dragon Emperor, General Yang (Anthony Wong)
- The Muppets, Tex Richman (Chris Cooper)
- Music and Lyrics, Sloan Cates (Campbell Scott)
- The Rock, Lonner (Xander Berkeley)
- Source Code, Dr. Rutledge (Jeffrey Wright)

==== Television ====
- CSI: NY, Mac Taylor (Gary Sinise)
- The Dead Zone, Malcolm Janus (Martin Donovan)
- Odyssey 5, Chuck Taggart (Peter Weller)
- Under the Dome, James "Big Jim" Rennie (Dean Norris)

==== Animation ====
- A Troll in Central Park (Alan)
- American Dragon: Jake Long (The Huntsman)
- Barbie as Rapunzel (Hobie)
- Bartok the Magnificent (The Skull)
- The Batman (Killer Croc)
- Bolt (Dr. Calico)
- Cars 2 (Brent Mustangburger)
- Dragon Tales (Quetzal)
- Iron Man (MODOK)
- Justice League (Doctor Fate)
- Justice League Unlimited (Doctor Fate)
- Planes (Brent Mustangburger)
- Planes: Fire & Rescue (Brent Mustangburger)
- Superman: The Animated Series (Doctor Fate)

=== Other ===
- Tsukutte Asobo, Gorori
