= Mobile Suit Gundam SEED C.E. 73: Stargazer =

Japanese ONA series

- Mobile Suit Gundam SEED C.E. 73 Stargazer
- Blu-ray release Cover

機動戦士ガンダムSEED C.E.73 STARGAZER (Kidō Senshi Gundam SEED C.E. 73: Stargazer)
- Genre: Mecha, action, drama, military science fiction
- Created by: Hajime Yatate; Yoshiyuki Tomino
- Original net animation
- Directed by: Susumu Nishizawa
- Produced by: Hiroomi Iketani, Yuko Soen
- Written by: Shigeru Morita
- Music by: Megumi Oohashi
- Studio: Sunrise
- Licensed by: NA: Sunrise
- Released: July 14, 2006
- Runtime: 16–18 minutes
- Episodes: 3
- Manga
- Written by: Naoki Moriya
- Published by: Kadokawa Shoten
- Magazine: Gundam Ace
- Original run: November 25, 2006 – March 26, 2007
- Volumes: 1

Mobile Suit Gundam SEED C.E. 73: Stargazer (Japanese: 機動戦士ガンダムSEED C.E.73 STARGAZER, Hepburn: Kidō Senshi Gundam SEED C.E. 73: Stargazer) is a side story to the anime television series Mobile Suit Gundam SEED Destiny. In July 2006, it began streaming on Bandai Channel website as an original net animation. The show is directed by Susumu Nishizawa and written by Shigeru Morita, both staff members of Gundam SEED Destiny.

The series consists of three episodes, each running at 15-minutes long. The web broadcast began in July 2006, with a new episode showing monthly. A DVD containing all three episodes as well as the two 5-minute Mobile Suit Gundam SEED Astray animated shorts was released on November 24, 2006. This DVD also contained a different ending for Stage 3 in which several scenes after the Phantom Pain attack are shown.

== Overview ==
Taking place immediately following the Break the World incident, Stargazer stars Selene McGriff, a 28-year-old female Coordinator and a researcher of the "Stargazer Project" for the Deep Space Survey and Development Organization (DSSD). The DSSD's project develops the GSX-401FW Stargazer Gundam for the purpose of space exploration. It also features Sven Cal Bayang, a 20-year-old male Natural who is a member of the Phantom Pain special forces and pilots the GAT-X105E Strike Noir Gundam. However, conflict arises when Phantom Pain plans to steal the research data relating to the Stargazer from the DSSD.

== Characters ==
=== Main characters ===
Selene McGriff (セレーネ・マクグリフ, Serēne Makugurifu)
Voiced by: Sayaka Ohara
A 28-year-old female Coordinator and an engineer on the GSX-401FW Stargazer Project. Her parents are also members of DSSD and like many other members of the organization she was born and raised in space. Can be egotistical some times but concentrates very hard on achieving her goals. After the failed assault on the DSSD space station, Selene is sent to somewhere between Earth and Venus, along with Sven, in the Stargazer. To conserve energy because the Stargazer's oxygen supply was estimated at 27 days, Selene places them both in a hibernation state. They are located 27 days and 21 hours later by Sol alive.
Sven Cal Bayang (スウェン・カル・バヤン, Suwen Karu Bayan)
Voiced by: Daisuke Ono
A 20-year old male Natural, and a member of the Phantom Pain special forces and pilots the GAT-X105E+AQM/E-X09S Strike Noir. As a child, Sven was a cheerful boy with a great fascination towards astronomy. After his parents died and he became an orphan, Sven was eventually adopted by the military to become a career soldier. His training hardened him as a person. He became a professional soldier, never once questioning his orders, even if it meant killing civilians. The training he received was related to the Blue Cosmos group, therefore a great deal of his training was to view Coordinators as inhuman, but unlike most, he did not hate Coordinators and managed to resist the Blue Cosmos indoctrination. He ends up in the Stargazer with Selene after the failed assault on the DSSD space station, abandoning the heavily damaged Strike Noir.

=== Phantom Pain/81st Autonomous Mobile Group ===
Shams Couza (シャムス・コーザ, Shamusu Kōza)
Voiced by: Hiroshi Kamiya/Mamoru Miyano
Natural; a male Lieutenant Junior Grade who works for the Phantom Pain. Together with Sven Cal Payang and Mudie Holcroft they form a special MS platoon. Like them, he underwent training as an anti-Coordinator soldier as a child. Shams wears large rectangular glasses, but they are just for show - his eyesight is excellent without them. He and his teammates encounter Martian pilot Ergnes Brahe, pilot of the GSF-YAM01 Δ Astray. The most cynical of the three, Shams pilots the GAT-X103AP Verde Buster. Shams is killed in the failed assault on the DSSD space station when his suit runs out of power and gets shot by the DSSD Astrays.
Mudie Holcroft (ミューディー・ホルクロフト, Myūdī Horukurofuto)
Voiced by: Rina Satō
Natural; a female Ensign who works for the Phantom Pain. Together with Sven Cal Payang and Shams Coza, they form a special MS platoon. Like them, she underwent training as an anti-Coordinator soldier as a child. She is quoted on two occasions as saying "The only good Coordinator is a dead Coordinator". She and her teammates encounter Martian pilot Ergnes Brahe, pilot of the GSF-YAM01 Δ Astray. She is killed when Kerberos BuCUE Hounds destroy her GAT-X1022 Blu Duel unit. In the Cosmic Era timeline, she is the first pilot whose Gundam unit is destroyed by grunt units, a distinction previously held by fellow Phantom Pain pilot Sting Oakley, in the main SEED Destiny series. Unlike Sting, however, she did not survive the destruction of her unit.
Joaquín (ホアキン, Hoakin)
Voiced by: Hidetoshi Nakamura
An Earth Alliance officer and the commander of the Nana Buluku. The ship that would be involved in the attack on the DSSD space station.

=== Deep Space Survey and Development Organization ===
Edmond Du Clos (エドモンド・デュクロ, Edomondo Dyukuro)
Voiced by: Jouji Nakata
A 37-year-old security officer in the DSSD's Technology Development Center in South America. He was once in the military as a tank platoon commander but retired after the First Bloody Valentine War when he held the rank of Lieutenant Commander. Because of this he however holds stronger resentment towards ZAFT members. He also has a strong sense of responsibility which he showed when he took his sister's son under his care. His sister was a DSSD engineer but was killed during the war. He successfully destroys a GINN Insurgent Type, allowing a DSSD shuttle to launch safely, but the GINN fires back, just before it got destroyed, killing Edmond and destroying the Linear Tank he was piloting.
Sol Lyne L'ange (ソル・リューネ・ランジュ, Soru Ryūne Ranju)
Voiced by: Jun Fukuyama
A 16-year-old male 1st generation Coordinator. He lives with his uncle Edmund du Clos after losing his parents in an accident. He is also the test pilot of the GSX-401FW Stargazer.

=== Others ===
Reyes (レイエス, Reiesu)
Voiced by: Masato Amada
A tank driver who assists Edmond when he faces off against the GINN. He is also a former subordinate from Edmond's time in the military.

== Media ==
=== Anime ===
Stargazer was released with all three episodes in Japan on November 24, 2006. The DVD added a new ending video, and included the promotional animation "Mobile Suit Gundam SEED ASTRAY -RED FRAME- & -BLUE FRAME-". A UMD version was released on June 26, 2009, and a Blu-ray version on March 22, 2013.

The ONA used the ED theme song, Stargazer Hoshi no Tobira (Stargazer ～星の扉, Door of the Stars), by Satori Negishi. The single was released in August 2006.

=== Manga ===
A manga adaptation of the ONA has been released in 2006 and 2007. Authored by Naoki Moriya, it features an epilogue that reveals the previously uncertain fate of Selene and Sven as they are shown to be alive and mostly unharmed from their ordeal. Sven joins the DSSD. The manga was fully released in June 2007.

Mobile Suit Gundam SEED C.E. 73 Δ Astray is a tie-in to Stargazer, and expands upon the technologies and organizations from this show. It is also the sequel to the Gundam SEED Destiny spinoff, Mobile Suit Gundam SEED Destiny Astray.

=== Game appearances ===
The series is included in Super Robot Wars K and in SD Gundam G Generation Cross Drive for the Nintendo DS. The series makes an appearance in Gundam Breaker 2 and in SD Gundam Capsule Fighter Online.

Preceded by Mobile Suit Gundam SEED Destiny	Gundam metaseries (production order); 2006	Succeeded by Mobile Suit Gundam 00
Preceded by Mobile Suit Gundam SEED Destiny	Gundam Cosmic Era timeline C.E. 73	Succeeded by Mobile Suit Gundam SEED Destiny, Mobile Suit Gundam SEED Freedom
