= Mobile Suit Gundam SEED C.E. 73 Δ Astray =

Japanese manga series

機動戦士ガンダムSEED C.E.73 Δ ASTRAY
- Genre: Mecha, action, military science fiction
- Created by: Hajime Yatate; Yoshiyuki Tomino
- Manga
- Written by: Tomohiro Chiba
- Illustrated by: Kōichi Tokita
- Published by: Kadokawa Shoten
- Magazine: Gundam Ace
- Original run: 2006 – 2007
- Volumes: 2
- See also
- Mobile Suit Gundam SEED Astray; Mobile Suit Gundam SEED Destiny Astray

Mobile Suit Gundam SEED C.E. 73 Δ Astray (機動戦士ガンダムSEED C.E.73 Δ ASTRAY; pronounced "Delta Astray") is a manga collection of gaiden (side stories) set in the Cosmic Era of Mobile Suit Gundam SEED Destiny, and is a follow-up to Mobile Suit Gundam SEED Destiny Astray. It is a tie in to the 2006 ONA side story Mobile Suit Gundam SEED C.E. 73: Stargazer.

== Plot ==
Δ Astray follows a team dispatched from Mars to Earth to establish contact with the coordinators of the ZAFT colonies and the humans on Earth and bring an understanding to their constant warring. The team is led by Ergnes Brahe, a 16-year-old Coordinator. The main crew consists of Ergnes and his second in command Nahe Herschel, a 19-year-old Coordinator. They are joined later by Diego Lowell, a 16-year-old of unspecified genetic type who came to Earth ahead of the rest of the team, aboard Lowe Guele's ship ReHOME.

The team is met with kind greetings at ZAFT but when they try to talk to the leaders of the Earth federation they are set up with the radical division known as Phantom Pain. Ergnes is subjected to a beating and is interrogated of the Martians possible intentions. They escape from the Phantom Pain and heads off to meet with the leaders of the Neutral country of Orb. The country is currently in a leadership crisis, and more radical leaders take control during the team's visit. The new leaders are in league with the racist terrorist organization known as the Blue Cosmos and issue the command to eliminate the genetically enhanced Martians.

The Martians face of against a team of Ace pilots from Orb that is aided by Sven Cal Payang, one of the main characters in Mobile Suit Gundam SEED C.E. 73: Stargazer. Ergnes and Nahe manage to fend off the attackers, but in Ergnes battle with Sven, the Martian is defeated.

After the Δ Astray became heavily damaged, a new mobile suit called the ∇ Astray (Turn Delta Astray) was introduced as the new title suit. Like the Δ Astray, the ∇ Astray utilizes the Voiture Lumiere technology.

== Production ==
Japanese pop-idol Nami Tamaki produced the song "Identity" as a part of the Delta Astray project.

== Characters ==
=== Mars ===
- Ergnes Brahe [GSΔA]

Coordinator; 16 years old; commander of the Acidalium and pilot of the GSF-YAM01 Δ Astray; highly impulsive; admires PLANT Chairman Gilbert Durandal and favors PLANT in the war despite the neutrality of the Mars colonies.

- Nahe Herschel [GSΔA]

Coordinator; 19 years old; second in command of the Acidalium and pilot of the seemingly transformable mobile armor Guardshell.

- Deago Lowell [GSΔA]

Coordinator; 16 years old; sent to Earth aboard the ReHOME as an advance scout for Agnes' team; steals Lowe Guele's Astray Red Frame Mars Jacket but later returns the Red Frame; now pilots a mass production Astray refitted with the Mars Jacket equipment.

- Setona Winters [GSDA/GSΔA]

Coordinator; 13-year-old girl (15 in CE 73) who helps Jess Rabble like an assistant, does all the chores and specializes in culinary arts; she is cheerful but also mysterious. She idolizes Lacus Clyne and has a necklace that is very similar to the one worn by Prayer Reverie. Setona is later revealed to be a Martian colonist and the older sister of Ergnes Brahe. However, as she traveled to Earth in suspended animation for several years, she is now younger than her brother. In late CE 73, she pilots the Turn Δ Astray to her brother's ship Acidalium, possibly to replace his crippled GSF-YAM01 Δ Astray.

=== ZAFT ===
- Isaac Mau [GSΔA]

Coordinator; member of Yzak Joule's mobile suit team; temporarily assigned by Chairman Durandal as an observer aboard the Martian ship Acidalium; pilots a TMF/A-802W2 Kerberos BuCUE Hound.

=== Orb ===
Having joined with the Alliance Orb has to comply with the Alliance and organizes a squad of pilots to attack the Martians, under the command of Phantom Pain pilot Sven Cal Payang from the Phantom Pain unit. The Orb pilots use the Phantom Pain GAT-01A2R Slaughter Dagger, each equipped with a different back unit called a "Striker Pack".

- Waid Rabby Nagada

Codename: Jaguar 1;
Striker Pack: P202QX I.W.S.P
A reckless pilot, who one day wishes to win the heart of Cagalli Yula Athha through his achievements in battle. He tried to dispose of Vanfeltd by not working together, but Vanfeldt survived. He wanted to make the others weaken Ergnes so that he could do the finishing strike. Yet as he feigned to have to resupply his energy, Gard who was in charge of the supplying was attacked and neutralized by Isaac Mau. So Waid returned to the battle with Ergnes, but Sven's flightpack was destroyed by the Martian. Thus he took automatic control of Waid's Dagger and took his I.W.S.P pack, which sent Waid crashing into the ocean without the ability to fly.

- Vanfelt Ria Lindsay

Codename: Panther 2;
Striker Pack: AQM/E-X01 Aile Striker
A pilot who wants to progress in the lower noble families of Orb, and tries to do it through his achievements in battle. As he and the others are sent out to eliminate the Martians Vanfeldt cuts in the battle before Waid, but is ultimately betrayed by him when he orders them to do a "pincer attack". As Waid leaves the battle, Vanfeldt is left alone with Ergnes shooting him down leaving a scar across Vanfeldt's face.

- Sars Sehm Ilia

Codename: Leopard 3;
Striker Pack: AQM/E-X03 Launcher Striker
A rather calm, but not so sure of herself pilot. She stays close to Gard and starts bombarding the Martian ship, Acidalium through the battle but Isaac Mau attacks them, resulting in Sars having to escape from her Dagger Mobile Suit.

- Hoskin Gira Sakato

Codename: Cougar 4;
Striker Pack: AQM/E-X02 Sword Striker
An analytic pilot who takes no interest in superstition, but only in real facts. As a surprise move he anchors the Acidalium to the seafloor and climbs on board. He is confronted by Nahe in the Guarshell, believing his Dagger is far superior to a "Mobile Armor" he is soon overwhelmed. As the Guardshell is in fact a transformable "Mobile Suit", and incapacitates Hoskin & his "Dagger".

- Gard Dell Hokuha

Codename: Tiger 5;
Striker Pack: P204QX Lightning Striker
A very protective pilot, he tries to keep his teammates safe, especially Sars. Yet as he and Sars starts bombarding the "Acidalium" in the battle outside of Orb, they are attacked by Isaac Mau. Both Mobile Suits are soon incapacitated by the ZAFT unit, and in his last words he tells Sars to run.

=== Earth Alliance ===
- Dana Snip

Natural; 22 years old; pilot of the GAT-X207SR Nero Blitz and a member of Phantom Pain.

- Emilio Bloderick

Natural; 20 years old; pilot of the GAT-303AA Rosso Aegis and a member of Phantom Pain.

== Media ==
=== Volume list ===
No.	Japanese release date	Japanese ISBN
1	February 26, 2007	978-4-04-713901-5
Gate 01. Martians; Gate 02. Blue Cosmos; Gate 03. Freedom; Gate 00A. Delta Astray; Gate 04. Terran; Gate 05. Big Battle
2	June 26, 2005	978-4-04-713932-9
Gate 06. Damage; Gate 07. IDentity; Gate 00B. Family; Gate 08. Destiny Plan; Gate 09. Turn Delta; Gate 10. Open Delta
