= Mobile Suit Gundam SEED Destiny =

Anime television series and its spinoffs

- 機動戦士ガンダムSEED(シード) DESTINY(デスティニー)
- Type: TV series
- Genre: Drama, mecha, military, tragedy
- Created by: Hajime Yatate; Yoshiyuki Tomino
- Directed by: Mitsuo Fukuda
- Series composition: Chiaki Morosawa
- Character designers: Hisashi Hirai
- Mechanical designers: Kunio Okawara; Kimitoshi Yamane
- Music by: Toshihiko Sahashi
- Country of origin: Japan
- Original language: Japanese
- No. of episodes: 50
- Episodes

Production
- Producers: Hirofumi Motomi (Mainichi Broadcasting); Hiroo Maruyama (Mainichi Broadcasting); Hiroyuki Sato
- Executive producers: Seiji Takeda (Mainichi Broadcasting); Yasuo Miyakawa
- Production companies: Mainichi Broadcasting System; Sunrise

Original release
- Networks: JNN (MBS, TBS)
- Release: October 9, 2004 – October 1, 2005

Related
- Anime television film

Final Plus: The Chosen Future
- Directed by: Mitsuo Fukuda
- Written by: Chiaki Morosawa
- Music by: Toshihiko Sahashi
- Studio: Sunrise
- Licensed by: NA: Sunrise
- Original network: JNN (MBS, TBS)
- Released: December 25, 2005
- Runtime: 47 minutes
- Manga
- Written by: Masatsugu Iwase
- Published by: Kodansha
- English publisher: NA: Del Rey Manga
- Magazine: Comic BomBom
- Original run: November 26, 2004 – April 26, 2006
- Volumes: 4
- Manga

Mobile Suit Gundam SEED Destiny: The Edge
- Written by: Chimaki Kuori
- Published by: Kadokawa Shoten
- Magazine: Gundam Ace
- Original run: February 25, 2005 – October 29, 2006
- Volumes: 5
- Manga

Mobile Suit Gundam SEED Destiny: The Edge Desire
- Written by: Chimaki Kuori
- Published by: Kadokawa Shoten
- Magazine: Gundam Ace
- Original run: June 26, 2007 – October 26, 2007
- Volumes: 2
- Related
- Mobile Suit Gundam SEED Destiny: Special Edition (films); Mobile Suit Gundam SEED Destiny Astray (manga); Mobile Suite Gundam SEED Eclipse (manga); Mobile Suit Gundam SEED Freedom (film)

Mobile Suit Gundam SEED Destiny (Japanese: 機動戦士ガンダムSEED(シード) DESTINY(デスティニー), Hepburn: Kidō Senshi Gandamu Shīdo Desutinī) is an anime television series, a direct sequel to Mobile Suit Gundam SEED by Sunrise and the overall tenth installment in the Gundam franchise. It retains most of the staff from Gundam SEED, including Director Mitsuo Fukuda. Set two years after the original Mobile Suit Gundam SEED, the plot follows the new character Shinn Asuka, a soldier from the Zodiac Alliance of Freedom Treaty, or ZAFT, composed of humans born genetically enhanced labelled as Coordinators. As ZAFT is about to enter into another war against the regular human race, the Naturals, the series focuses on Shinn's as well as various returning characters' involvement in the war. The series spanned 50 episodes, aired in Japan from October 2004 to October 2005, on the Japan News Network television stations Tokyo Broadcasting System and Manichi Broadcasting System.

In December 2005, Sunrise aired a special episode that remade the events from the series' last episode. A series of four films compiling the series has also been released in Japan. Gundam SEED was adapted into various manga adaptations and light novels published by Kodansha and Kadokawa Shoten. Bandai Entertainment licensed the series for North America release, and has published it in DVD volumes. The series also aired on television in Canada, while the compilation films were also released in DVDs. The first manga was licensed and published by Del Rey Manga. Various types of merchandising have also been released, including CD soundtracks and video games. In 2013, a HD remaster of the series was released by Sunrise.

Gundam SEED Destiny became highly popular in Japan, having sold over one million DVD volumes and soundtracks topping charts. The series was also the winner of the Anime Grand Prix in both 2004 and 2005 polls. Critical reception has also been positive with focus on the themes and events occurring throughout the series. However, Gundam SEED Destiny has often been compared with its predecessor for sharing similar situations with the director's cut OVA having helped to improve an ending that was felt to be weak.

A sequel film titled Mobile Suit Gundam SEED Freedom was released in January 2024.

== Plot ==
Gundam SEED Destiny sets the story two years after the original series and it starts when the leader from Orb, Cagalli Yula Athha, reunites with the PLANTs' Supreme Council chairman Gilbert Durandal to discuss the construction of new mobile suits made for the military organization ZAFT. Three of them are stolen by a group called Phantom Pain, which is controlled by the Blue Cosmos terrorist organization. Cagalli's bodyguard Athrun Zala joins ZAFT pilot Shinn Asuka to stop them. During the fight, ZAFT's battleship Minerva is ordered to destroy the ruins of a space colony to prevent it from crashing into Earth. They find out that rogue ZAFT soldiers are controlling the colony in order to crash it into Earth. After failing to completely destroy the colony, a second war starts between the factions, the Earth Alliance and ZAFT, once news has spread that ZAFT soldiers caused the colony to collide on Earth. The neutral country of Orb allies with the Earth Alliance, with the former having also joined Blue Cosmos. This leads these three faction to confront the ZAFT soldiers several times, with Athrun having returned there.

Later in the war, the Archangel battleship interferes in the fights between ZAFT and the Earth Alliance's faction. Allied with the Archangel, Cagalli fails to stop her country from fighting and the Archangel intervenes. Athrun becomes disaffected after Gilbert Durandal orders the destruction of his friend Kira Yamato and the Archangel, deeming them as enemies. He defects with Meyrin Hawke when Durandal frames him as a traitor. Cagalli is able to regain leadership from Orb, causing the Blue Cosmos' members to flee to space. The leader of Blue Cosmos, Lord Djibril, orders the super weapon Requiem to be fired which destroys several space colonies of PLANT, resulting in many deaths. The crew of the Minerva successfully kills Lord Djibril and capture the Requiem. Gilbert Durandal then announces the "Destiny Plan", a plan where a person's job or task will be based on their genetics, and uses the Requiem to destroy anyone who opposes him. This brings Shinn and the crew of the Minerva into direct conflict with the Archangel faction. Kira and Athrun with their new mobile suits and their allies, defeat the ZAFT forces and destroy the Requiem. Durandal is killed by one of his own followers, Rey Za Burrel.

The series' ending was expanded in both the original video animation and the last compilation film. Soon after Durandal's death, the Earth Alliance, ZAFT, and the Orb Union meet to end the war, with Lacus Clyne acting as the negotiator. After fighting between each other various time in their mobile suits, Kira and Shinn meet in person for the second time and promise to join forces for a better future.

== Production ==
Mobile Suit Gundam SEED Destiny was first announced in July 2004 in Japanese magazines. Earlier, voice actor Tomokazu Seki had stated he was working on a popular show with fans hinting it was related to Mobile Suit Gundam SEED. Next month, the first trailer from the series was hosted online in its official website. Before the series' premiere, staff member Kabashima Yousuke gave hints about Shinn's character, telling that the Gundam SEED Destiny's protagonist would be a character not seen in the prequel, and he would have a thin appearance. The main staff from Mobile Suit Gundam SEED remained in Gundam SEED Destiny including director Mitsuo Fukuda. When the series was premiering in Japan, Fukuda stated that unlike Gundam SEED, the sequel would not focus on Kira's and Athrun's relationship, but on Shinn's involvement in the war. He addressed that such conflict would happen in the series, but refrained from giving its reasons. In order to add more entertainment to the series, the staff also worked on the fight scenes between mobile suits. Shinn's character was meant to contrast Kira's in regards to their involvement across the series, but as Kira did, he would also go through a major development.

Kira's inclusion in Destiny was made in order to tell a story from three people's point of views: Kira's, Athrun's and Shinn. The director lamented that from the three protagonists, Kira was the least explored character during the making of the series alongside two other characters with major importance: Durandal and Lacus. Fukuda described Kira in SEED Destiny as a person who runs away from fights often despite his feelings for Orb. His characterization was made to change briefly across the story as Kira faced Gilbert Durandal's ideals and became a person more compromised with war in contrast to his original pacifist persona after this incarnation was challenged by multiple other characters in regards to his actions on the battlefield. A letter was sent to Kenichi Suzumura, the voice actor for Shinn, stating that he "disliked Shin" for symbolic reasons such as "being an enemy of Kira and Athrun" and "being an ally of Durandal." Suzumura responded by saying that "Shin, who opposes Kira and doesn't listen to Athrun, becomes the villain in the drama, but a work can be viewed from an objective perspective," "you can learn both sides of the opposing viewpoints," and "you can try to understand even the antagonistic characters."

== Media ==
=== Anime ===
Gundam SEED Destiny had its premiere broadcast in Japan on October 9, 2004, at 6:00 p.m. on the Japan News Network television stations Tokyo Broadcasting System and Mainichi Broadcasting System replacing the first Fullmetal Alchemist anime series and ended on October 1, 2005. In December 2005, a special episode called Final Plus: The Chosen Future aired in Japan. The episode is mainly a remake of episode 50, extending the series' ending. The series was collected in a total of thirteen DVD volumes that were released in Japan from February 24, 2005, to February 24, 2005. A DVD box from the television series that also included the special episode was released on April 9, 2010.

The series was licensed by Bandai Entertainment for the North American market. The English adaptation was produced by Bandai Entertainment in association with The Ocean Group and the English-language dub was recorded at Ocean Studios. The series was released on twelve DVDs in North America in uncut bilingual format between March 14, 2006, and January 8, 2008. The Final Plus episode was announced to have been licensed in July 2007, with a single DVD released on April 15, 2008. Two "Anime Legends" DVD boxes volumes from the series were later released on January 13, 2009, and May 19, 2009. Gundam SEED Destiny began its Canadian broadcast on YTV's Bionix programming block on March 9, 2007, at 9:30 p.m. YTV did not air the special recap episode, "Edited". On January 11, 2008, Gundam SEED Destiny was moved to the 10:30 p.m. Bionix timeslot starting with episode 40, switching timeslots with Bleach. On March 28, 2008, it ended its first run. In 2007, the series was available on demand from May through June with Comcast Cable in the United States. In July 2007, only episodes 1 to 22 have been aired and was thought to be discontinued on Comcast Cable; however, in September 2007, it has been made available again, this time with the English-dubbed version. Comcast Cable aired the 50th English episode at the end of February 2008. Due to the closure of Bandai Entertainment, the series has been out-of-print. On October 11, 2014, at their 2014 New York Comic Con panel, Sunrise announced they will be releasing all of the Gundam franchise, including Gundam SEED and Gundam SEED Destiny in North America though distribution from Right Stuf Inc., beginning in Spring 2015. Sunrise released the HD remaster of SEED Destiny in North America with a brand new English dub produced by NYAV Post on November 9, 2021.

In November 2012, Sunrise announced through the last remastered episode of Gundam SEED a Gundam SEED Destiny HD remaster project. Shortly afterwards, director Mitsuo Fukuda announced in his Twitter account that the final episode of the HD rerelease would combine elements from the original finale with the Special Edition compilation films.

Mobile Suit Gundam SEED C.E. 73: Stargazer is an original net animation side-story to Gundam SEED Destiny, and began streaming on July 14, 2006. A DVD containing all three episodes was released on November 24, 2006, in Japan.

=== Compilation films ===
A film version of the TV series was released as Mobile Suit Gundam SEED Destiny: Special Edition, which retells the story in four 90 minute parts. Unlike the Mobile Suit Gundam SEED: Special Edition films, this retelling of Gundam SEED Destiny is focused on Athrun Zala's point of view. Its four DVD volumes were released from May 25, 2006, to February 23, 2007. A DVD box of both Gundam SEED: Special Edition and Gundam SEED Destiny: Special Edition was released in Japan on February 25, 2010. Gundam SEED: Special Edition was licensed for North America by Bandai Entertainment and was released on bilingual DVDs between June 17, 2008, and January 13, 2009. Sunrise will release Gundam SEED Destiny: Special Edition in conjunction with Right Stuf Inc. beginning in 2015.

=== Theatrical film ===
Although a plot was written, production did not go ahead on the Gundam SEED Destiny theatrical film. It would have been the first full-length film within the Gundam metaseries since Mobile Suit Gundam F91 (1991), but because of the delays the Mobile Suit Gundam 00 film instead held that mantle. This film was first announced on May 6, 2006, at the Sony Music Anime Fes' 06 with a brief clip featuring the characters Shinn Asuka, Cagalli Yula Athha, Lacus Clyne, Kira Yamato, and Athrun Zala. After the Sony Music Anime Fes' 06, Sunrise announced the film on their website.

Houko Kuwashima, voice actress of character Stella Loussier, has stated on her "SEED Club blog" that the character will somehow also have a role in the film. Lacus, Yzak Joule, and Dearka Elsman will return as members of the PLANT Supreme Council and Kira, Shinn, and Lunamaria Hawke will be part of the ZAFT military.

In the April 2008 edition of the Animage magazine, writer Chiaki Morosawa explained that although she has managed to complete the outline for the plot, the requirement of continuous treatment for her illness has led to the indefinite postponement of the project. Chiaki Morosawa later died on February 19, 2016. However, Takanori Nishikawa mentioned at the Gundam 40th Fes. “Live-Beyond” concert in 2019 that he was told by a staff member that the film was still in pre-production. On May 28, 2021, the film was announced as being in production. It was released in January 2024.

=== Manga ===
Several manga series based on the Gundam SEED Destiny story have been released. The first one, sharing the same title, was written and illustrated by Masatsugu Iwase from November 26, 2004 to April 26, 2006. It was published in four tankōbon volumes from April 22, 2005, to June 23, 2006, by Kodansha. Del Rey Manga licensed this manga for release in North America in December 2005. The volumes were published between June 27, 2006, and July 31, 2007.

Chimaki Kuori also wrote Mobile Suit Gundam SEED Destiny: The Edge that tells the events of the anime from the viewpoint of Athrun Zala. Kadokawa Shoten published the series in a total of five volumes released between April 26, 2005, and October 26, 2006. After the end of the series, Kuori has released several chapters focusing on the other characters in the series under the name of Mobile Suit Gundam SEED Destiny: The Edge Desire. The first volume of this series was released on June 26, 2007, and the second on February 26, 2008. A manga version of Mobile Suit Gundam SEED Destiny Astray was written by Tomohiro Chiba and illustrated by Kōichi Tokita, and published in Gundam Ace magazine. It was collected in four volumes from January 25, 2005 to June 26, 2006. Later another side story was created called Mobile Suit Gundam SEED Frame Astrays.

=== CDs ===
Numerous soundtrack and character CDs have been released for the series by Victor Entertainment. Three soundtrack albums featuring music composed by Toshihiko Sahashi were released during the 2004-2005 series run. These were the Mobile Suit Gundam Seed Destiny Original Soundtracks, numbered by Roman numerals from I through III. Soundtrack I contained a new song by Rie Tanaka and was released on December 16, 2004, Soundtrack II included a new song by Houko Kuwashima and was released on April 21, 2005, and Soundtrack III contained series theme music by Yuki Kajiura and was released on August 24, 2005. Additionally, a fourth soundtrack, Mobile Suit Gundam Seed Destiny Original Soundtrack IV, which contained selected music from the series score, was released on February 2, 2006. The first-press versions of all four soundtracks included a deluxe plastic box container, which replaced the standard jewel case for the standard release versions. An orchestral album of selections from the series score, Kokyo Kumikyoku Mobile Suit Gundam Seed Destiny, was released on December 16, 2005, and featured performances by the London Symphony Orchestra. Besides the soundtracks, six character Suit CDs were released featuring songs and spoken drama sequences. They acted as a follow-up to the six CDs released for Gundam SEED.

A total of four sets of opening and ending theme songs were used in Gundam SEED Destiny. In similar fashion to the original Gundam SEED, the songs were performed by a mix of high-profile and up-and-coming artists. As before, a number of the featured songs became top-charting singles such as T.M.Revolution's "Ignited". The third opening theme, Bokutachi no Yukue was performed by fifteen-year-old newcomer Hitomi Takahashi, and released on April 13, 2005. The selection of the previously unknown Takahashi mirrored that of Nami Tamaki, who was chosen to sing the third opening theme for the original Gundam SEED. Additionally, two insert songs that were used in Gundam SEED Destiny achieved strong sales and popularity. These include Honoo no Tobira, performed by FictionJunction Yuuka. and vestige, performed by T.M.Revolution.

Two compilation albums including the credit themes and insert songs were also released, as well as an additional album including music from both Gundam SEED and Gundam SEED Destiny. The first compilation disc, Mobile Suit Gundam SEED Destiny Complete Best, was released on May 7, 2006, and included all eight themes with remixes. A deluxe version of this same album which included a box and a DVD containing the opening and ending animation footage was also released. A two-disc set, Mobile Suit Gundam SEED – SEED DESTINY Best: THE BRIDGE, contained music from both series as well as the character Suit series and was released on November 22, 2006. The first-press version of this album included a booklet, art card, and poster.

=== Video games ===
Various video games based on Gundam SEED Destiny have been released. For the PlayStation 2 there were Kidou Senshi Gundam SEED Destiny: Rengou vs ZAFT, and Mobile Suit Gundam SEED Destiny: Generation of C.E. Kidou Senshi Gundam SEED Destiny: Rengou vs ZAFT II Plus was originally released as an arcade game under the name Mobile Suit Gundam Seed Destiny: Rengou vs. Z.A.F.T. II, and later ported to PS2. The PS2 port was released on December 7, 2006. For the PlayStation Portable it was released Kidou Senshi Gundam SEED: Rengou vs ZAFT Portable, while for the Game Boy Advance it was released a game with the series' same title on November 25, 2004.

Various crossover games have also been released. These include the Gundam's franchise games Dynasty Warriors: Gundam, Dynasty Warriors: Gundam 2, Mobile Suit Gundam: Gundam vs. Gundam, and the SD Gundam series. Other series include the Super Robot Wars, debuting with Super Robot Wars Z. Another game featuring Gundam SEED Destiny characters is Another Century's Episode R.

=== Other merchandise ===
The anime has been adapted into a series of five light novels by Riu Goto who previously wrote the Gundam SEED novels adaptation and published by Kadokawa Shoten. The first volume was released on March 1, 2005, and the last on April 1, 2006. Kodansha also published three series of magazines under the label of "Official File" that focus on characters' and mobile suits' analysis.

== Reception ==
The series has been highly popular in Japan, having won the Animage Anime Grand Prix awards for best anime in the 2004 and 2005 polls. In both of these polls, Athrun Zala, Kira Yamato and Lacus Clyne have also topped the most popular characters categories, with the last episode and the OVA also occupying their own category. DVD sales have been good, with various of them appearing in official Japanese rankings. In November 2005, Bandai Visual announced that Gundam SEED Destiny had sold over one million DVD volumes in Japan. Soundtracks have also been popular with both themes from T.M. Revolution and Nami Tamaki topping Oricon charts during their release. In the Recording Industry Association of Japan's awards, Gundam SEED Destiny was the winner in the category of animation album. In the Anime Nation's top selling DVDs, the twelfth Gundam SEED Destiny volume ranked ninth.

Critical reception for Gundam SEED Destiny has been positive but it was often compared with Gundam SEED. Gundam SEED's backstory was noted to be essential for the plot of Gundam SEED Destiny to the point that Maria Lin considered that it was required to watch the former to fully understand the series. The new cast of characters was well-received with the relationship between Rey Za Burrel and Neo Roanoke bringing speculations regarding their identities due to how it mirrored one from Gundam SEED. However, initial reaction to lead character Shinn Asuka has been mixed due to his antagonistic personality and how some of the new and returning characters overshadowed his role in the series. While at some points Shinn's role and relationships were found entertaining, UK Anime's Ross Liversidge liked how returning character Kira Yamato took bigger role in the series as he was more likable.

Still, the themes from the series have also been praised for being entertaining and debatable despite also sharing it with other Gundam series. Chris Beveridge from Mania Entertainment further commented on this, stating that while it brings parallels other series, Gundam SEED Destiny's themes are "also done well enough that it stands firmly on its own." The last episodes were criticized for bringing situations similar to the ones from the ending of Gundam SEED. In contrast, the fight scenes occurring in these episodes were praised alongside the emotional impact brought by some scenes. The OVA repraising the events from the series' last episode was praised for explaining events from Gundam SEED Destiny such as Gilbert Durandal's discussions with Rau Le Creuset. It was also noted make a more satisfying ending, allowing to develop more of their characters with the emotional focus being more explored than in the television series' finale.

The series' animation was highly praised for the coloring and character designs. The mobile suits' designs have been well-received despite the fact they transformed, something considered cheesy by Anime News Network's Paul Fargo. The fight scenes were also noted to be the main focus from the televisions series' last episodes, as they brought entertaining action scenes with the new mechas introduced. However, the OVA was noted to downplay these scenes, with some of them being hard to fully understand. Soundtracks also had praise for bringing enjoyable themes and the return from Nami Tamaki. Fargo stated that composer Toshihiko Sahashi notably improved his scores from Gundam SEED, with artists' opening and ending themes also being entertaining. The Japanese voice was noted to bring popular idols such as Maaya Sakamoto, resulting in an enjoyable one. On the other hand, response to the English casting was mixed with some actors making appealing portrayals while in other cases poor ones. Nevertheless, Don Houston from DVD Talk advised viewers to listen to the English dub rather than the original Japanese version, having noticed that some sound effects were remixed and thus improved the audio.

In July 2021, media reporting on the wake of former Philippine President Benigno Aquino III noted that the song “Kimi wa Boku ni Niteiru” from the Gundam Suit Destiny series as military honor guards escorted his urn to the front of the Ateneo de Manila University's Church of Gesu where his memorial service would be held. This resulted in some speculation that President Aquino, a known gamer, may have been a fan of the series.

Preceded by Mobile Suit Gundam MS IGLOO	Gundam metaseries (production order); 2004–2005	Succeeded by Mobile Suit Gundam SEED C.E. 73: Stargazer
Preceded by Mobile Suit Gundam SEED	Gundam Cosmic Era timeline C.E. 73	Succeeded by Mobile Suit Gundam SEED C.E. 73: Stargazer
