= Mobile Suit Gundam: Encounters in Space =

2003 video game

- NTSC-U cover art
- Developer: Bec
- Publisher: Bandai
- Composers: Tadayoshi Makino; Yasuharu Takanashi; Takanori Arima; Koji Yamada
- Platform: PlayStation 2
- Release: JP: September 4, 2003; NA: December 4, 2003
- Genres: Action, Hack and slash, Mecha simulation, Third-person shooter, Mecha, Military science fiction
- Modes: Single-player, multiplayer

Mobile Suit Gundam: Encounters in Space (Note: Japanese: 機動戦士ガンダム めぐりあい宇宙, Hepburn: Kidō Senshi Gandamu: Meguriai Sora) is a third-person shooter action video game for the PlayStation 2 released in 2003. The game is centered on space based mobile suit (or mecha) combat. The game is based on the Universal Century timeline of the popular Gundam franchise.

Rather than tell a single continuous story, the single-player game in Encounters in Space is broken up into a few short vignettes that take place over the course of four years. These vignettes are accounts of several significant battles during and after the One Year War between the Earth Federation and the Principality of Zeon.

== Gameplay ==
The game takes place entirely in outer space, although the Moon, space colonies, and asteroids are sometimes visited. The player pilots a wide variety of Mobile Suits, Mobile Armours, and other spacecraft throughout several different zero gravity environments. Also thrusters can be used to give these mobile weapons a temporary boost in speed and maneuverability. These vehicles can move forward, backward, and side to side using the left analog stick and can move up and down using the R1 and R2 buttons, allowing for 360 degree combat. The game is mostly free roaming, although a few rail shooter sections are commonly encountered.

Players can use a large assortment of different main, sub, and melee weapons that vary greatly between different units. Certain crafts are also equipped with a special attack, which can be activated once a special meter has been filled. The game is divided into several different story modes, each corresponding to a different pilot or setting. These pilots range from main characters of the original Gundam series to lesser known pilots from the Gundam manga. The game also includes a two player multiplayer vs. mode. Players can also play against AI units in multiplayer. Finally there is a mode where players can create their own unique pilots for use in multiplayer.

== Reception ==
Reception

Aggregate score
Aggregator	Score
Metacritic	66/100

Review scores
Publication	Score
Famitsu	30/40
Game Informer	6.5/10
GameSpot	7/10
GameSpy	3/5
IGN	7.9/10
Official U.S. PlayStation Magazine	1/5
PlayStation: The Official Magazine	7/10
X-Play	2/5

The game received "average" reviews according to the review aggregation website Metacritic. IGN said the game was the best Gundam title on the PS2 so far. They stated that the game played like a Zone of the Enders clone but said that it wasn't necessarily a bad thing. They also praised the game for its large assortment of units, levels, and bonus content and recommended the game to Gundam and shooter fans. GameSpot called the game one of the more accessible Gundam games to be released. However, they criticized that the plot would confuse newcomers to the Gundam series. Still, they praised the game for its quick pace action. Game Informer gave the Japanese import a mixed review over a month before the game was released stateside. In Japan, Famitsu gave it a score of 30 out of 40.

== Manga ==
Cover Art for Mobile Suit Gundam Side Story: Space, to The End of a Flash

"Thoroughbred Mode", one of the stories in the game revolving around a Pegasus class ship named Thoroughbred and its crew, was adapted to a three volume manga written by Tomohiro Chiba and illustrated by Masato Natsumoto, named Mobile Suit Gundam Side Story: Space, to The End of a Flash (機動戦士ガンダム外伝 宇宙、閃光の果てに…, Kidō Senshi Gandamu Gaiden: Sora, Senkō no Hate ni...?). It also received a novelization, which was released to coincide with Encounters in Space.

== See also ==
- Mobile Suit Gundam
- List of Gundam video games
