= Kōichi Tokita =

Japanese manga artist (born 1961)

- Born: April 4, 1961 (age 64); Chiba, Chiba, Japan
- Occupation: Manga artist
- Known for: comicalizing Gundam anime
- Website: Kōichi Tokita's blog

Kōichi Tokita (ときた 洸一, Tokita Kōichi; born April 4, 1961) is a Japanese manga artist that is best known for his Gundam manga. Most of his works deal with the alternate universe Gundam series such as Mobile Fighter G Gundam, and Mobile Suit Gundam Wing.

Before he became a manga artist, he did package layout for Bandai plamo and package illustration for Namco Famicom games.

Not much is known about him, but in his various works he is depicted as a somewhat overweight man that wears a headband with various pens stuck to it.

== Works ==
=== Serialized in Comic Bom Bom ===
- The Great Battle III
- Gaia Saver
- Mobile Fighter G Gundam
- Ganbare! Domon-kun Gundam Party
- Mobile Suit Gundam W
- New Mobile Report Gundam W: Battlefield of Pacifist
- New Mobile Report Gundam W: Endless Waltz
- New Mobile Report Gundam W: G-UNIT
- Mobile Suit Gundam X
- Mobile Suit Gundam: Char's Counterattack
- ∀Gundam
- SD Gundam Eiyuden
- SD Gundam Sangokuden Fuuun Gouketsu Hen

=== Serialized in Gundam Ace ===
- Mobile Suit Gundam SEED Astray
- Mobile Suit Gundam SEED X Astray
- Mobile Suit Gundam SEED Destiny Astray
- Mobile Suit Gundam SEED C.E. 73 Δ Astray
- Mobile Suit Gundam 00F
- Mobile Suit Gundam 00I
- Mobile Suit Gundam 00I 2314

=== Serialized in Dengeki Hobby Magazine ===
- Mobile Suit Gundam SEED Frame Astrays

=== Others ===
- BB Senshi Sangokuden Fuuun Gouketsu Hen (poster art)
- Marvel Land (character design)
