= Mobile Suit Gundam: The Last Outpost =

Japanese manga series

- Cover of the first volume of Mobile Suit Gundam: The Last Outpost

新機動戦記ガンダムW デュアルストーリー G-UNIT (New Mobile Report Gundam Wing Dual Story: G-UNIT)
- Genre: Mecha; Military science fiction
- Created by: Hajime Yatate; Yoshiyuki Tomino
- Manga
- Written by: Kōichi Tokita
- Published by: Kodansha; Kadokawa Shoten (Reprint)
- English publisher: NA: Tokyopop
- Magazine: Comic BonBon
- Original run: September 1997 – April 1998
- Volumes: 3
- Manga

Operation Galiarest
- Written by: Kōichi Tokita
- Published by: Kadokawa Shoten
- Magazine: Gundam Ace
- Original run: August 2019 – November 2021
- Volumes: 5

Mobile Suit Gundam: The Last Outpost (新機動戦記ガンダムW デュアルストーリー G-UNIT, Shin Kidō Senki Gandamu Wingu Duaru Sutōrī G-UNIT; "New Mobile Report Gundam Wing Dual Story: G-UNIT") is a manga series created and written Kōichi Tokita, first serialized in Kodansha's Comic Bom Bom magazine from September 1997 to April 1998, compiling up to 3 volumes. Tokyopop licensed the manga outside Japan. Kadokawa Shoten reprinted the manga series in a Shinsō-ban edition with Tokita's involvement, and is also released in 3 volumes from October to November 2020. A sequel manga was also serialized in Kadokawa Shoten's Gundam Ace magazine from August 2019 to November 2021.

The manga series is a spinoff of Mobile Suit Gundam Wing. Unlike most other Gundam Wing manga, G-UNIT introduces an entirely new cast of characters and mobile suits and does not feature any of the anime characters or Gundams, with the exception of a few brief cameos.

== Story ==
The events outlined in the G-UNIT manga begin following the collapse of the United Earth Sphere Alliance government. The OZ organization, which subsequently rose to power, sought to quickly build a support base among the space colonies. One of the colonies which pledged its support was MO-V, a backwater asteroid belt colony with about 100,000 residents, known mainly for its outdated Leo production facilities. Because mobile dolls like the Taurus were replacing the aging Leo model, MO-V was largely ignored by OZ. However, a few people, notably Romefeller Foundation head Duke Dermail, knew about the colony's secret project to develop high-powered mobile suits.

== Characters ==
Odin Bernett: Odin begins as a rash pilot who rushes headlong into fights before evaluating them. Initially enthusiastic about his role as a peacekeeper and Gundam pilot, Odin is forced to face reality as the war drags on. This experience helps him to grow more mature and responsible. Additionally, his skills also improve and he is able to activate the PX System and eclipse his brother's abilities.

Odel Bernett: Odel is calm and collected and possesses a good intuition both in and out of battle. His piloting skills are impressive, but he often finds himself on the losing end of fights. Still, his resolve to help MO-V survive is never suppressed, nor does he ever lose sight of his objectives. After losing Geminass unit 02, he adopts the identity "Silver Crown" and dons a mask to continue fighting from within Prize.

Lucille Aisley: Lucille is a mechanic, her duties include programming the unit's systems and repairs, and she is highly proficient in both. She secretly harbors feelings for Odin but is more vocal in her displeasure for his various shenanigans.

Tricia Farrell: Trica is a communications officer, her chief duties are operating the colony's communications and tracking equipment. She is Odel's fiancée.

Roga Hermann: Roga is the colony representative, he formerly worked with their father Mark and dreamed of humanity crossing the stars. Hermann cares deeply about the lives of his people and is determined to save the colony with as minimal damage as possible.

Dick Higasaki: Dick is the chief engineer, he is an expert at repairing the Gundams and has made several impressive modifications to their complicated PX systems. He even whips up mobile dolls to serve as colony defenses from spare Leo parts and stolen data Odel brought from Grand Shario.

Roche Nattono: Roche is the leader of the Stardust Knights. He is devoted to knightly honor and pride above all things. However, that pride got the best of him when he was humiliated in battle against Odin, and he became enraged at his supposed inferiority. After Valder Farkill assumed leadership of his team, Roche joined MO-V's defenses and learned to keep his emotions in check.

Kratz Silvy: Kratz is a Member of the Stardust Knights. She follows Roche but does not agree with his chivalrous ways. Thus, he welcomes the arrival of Farkill and happily joins his side so he can fight as effectively and brutally as he truly desires. His lust for power leads to his demise, however, as he pushes his mobile suit and mind past their limits.

Broom Brooks: Although his size and custom mobile suit speak volumes about his brute force, Broom is totally loyal to Roche's knightly approach and operates with restraint when called for. His refusal to accept Farkill's tactics results in his destruction.

Dr. Berg: Formerly a mobile suit designer at MO-V, he defects to OZ Prize and continues to play both sides against the other by continually upgrading their Gundams. His goal is to develop the perfect weapon and will happily make whatever sacrifices necessary without any question of morality. His failsafe, the "Auto-Destruct Program Berg-01" he activated with his last breath, further proves his shallow nature.

Valder Farkill: Nicknamed "Dark General of Destruction". In the battle against the UESA, he was in the same team as Zechs Merquise (the elite OZ "Specials"), but Farkill recorded more kills than everybody else combined. Farkill's abilities are nearly unmatched in combat, and he is driven by the mad desire to defeat Treize Khushrenada, a dream that he never got to realize.

Luna Armonia: Luna's beauty and charm cover her dark past, filled with ruthless combat and painful memories. She grew up as a guerilla and, along with sister Soris, managed to survive several difficult years before becoming a mobile suit pilot. She and Soris were recruited by Farkill and served him until their units were destroyed by Grand Shario's main cannon. She managed to survive, however, and was present at the Bernett-Farrell wedding.

Soris Armonia: Soris lacks Luna's grace but is a superb pilot, unwavering in the face of the enemy and unafraid to lose her life for what she believes. She helped her sister Luna survive a harsh guerilla war before becoming a mobile suit pilot. She and Luna served Farkill until their units were destroyed by Grand Shario's main cannon. She managed to survive, however, and was present at the Bernett-Farrell wedding.

Aretha Walker: She is an officer aboard Grand Shario. She secretly harbors feelings for Roche Nattono and happily obeys any orders he gives. During Operation Pandora, she defects to MO-V to be at Roche's side.

Lon Sernan: Lon is a Tech officer. He was present at Lake Victoria base when it was attacked by the Shenlong Gundam (Gundam Wing episode 4, The Victorian Nightmare) and was later assigned to space fortress Barge. Sernan went to MO-V on a secret intelligence-gathering mission but was intercepted by Prize. He was rescued and taken to the colony, where he helped with MO-V's mobile suits until the war's end, when he joined the Preventers as Agent Quatorize.

Captain Cage: Cage is the barge officer, he ordered Sernan on a top secret reconnaissance mission that was to be on his authority only - not even Lady Une was to know. Having apparently escaped Barge's destruction, he joined the Preventers after the war.
