= Mobile Suit Gundam SEED Destiny Astray =

Japanese manga series

- Cover of volume one of Mobile Suit Gundam SEED Destiny Astray

機動戦士ガンダムSEED DESTINY ASTRAY
- Genre: Mecha, Action, military science fiction
- Created by: Hajime Yatate; Yoshiyuki Tomino
- Manga
- Written by: Tomohiro Chiba
- Illustrated by: Kōichi Tokita
- Published by: Kadokawa Shoten
- Magazine: Gundam Ace
- Original run: November 2004 – April 2006
- Volumes: 4
- See also
- Mobile Suit Gundam SEED Astray; Mobile Suit Gundam SEED C.E. 73 Δ Astray

Mobile Suit Gundam SEED Destiny Astray (機動戦士ガンダムSEED DESTINY ASTRAY) is a collection of gaiden (side-stories) set in the Cosmic Era timeline of Mobile Suit Gundam SEED Destiny. The story was told in three different mediums, as a manga in Gundam ACE, a photo novel in Dengeki Hobby and two novels published by Kadokawa Shoten Publishing Co., Ltd. The series started in November 2004 and ended in April 2006 after 21 chapters. It was followed up by Mobile Suit Gundam SEED C.E. 73 Δ Astray, which also tied into Mobile Suit Gundam SEED C.E. 73: Stargazer.

== Plot ==
Destiny Astray focuses on war photo-journalist Jess Rabble and his ZGMF-X12 Astray Out Frame. The Astray Out Frame was built by Lowe (using the incomplete frame of a ZAFT ZGMF-X12A Testament), and later given to Jess. Jess is often accompanied by Kaite Madigan, a mercenary and former ZAFT mobile suit pilot who serves as his bodyguard and owns several customized mobile suits of his own. Both are currently employees of a mysterious industrialist named Matias, who claims to have "no grasp of history", therefore he wishes for Jess to record history as it unfolds. Lowe is effectively removed from the story in the first chapter of Destiny Astray where he begins a long journey to Mars. He returns in later chapters that are set two years later. Many other Astray characters, including Gai, Canard, and Rondo Mina, also continue to appear in supporting roles. The story provides the reader with background information not shown in the TV series.

== Production ==
The Mobile Suit Gundam SEED Destiny Astray series was in a production venture that encompassed four forms of media. It was firstly the TV-series Mobile Suit Gundam SEED Destiny which told the main story and presented several plot-points that was addressed in the other mediums. The second was the photo-novels that presented side stories to "Destiny Astray" as well as technical files on the mobile Suits and how to construct them in models. The third media was two novels that contained several stories with the "Destiny Astray" cast and were linked to the main story.

=== Photo-novels ===
The photo-novels were published in the Japanese Dengeki Hobby Magazine by Mediaworks. Each chapter called a "Shot" was released up to "Shot 026", each chapter compromising 8-11 pages. It usually followed a layout of having one or two two-page spreads with a scene enactment with models of the "Mobile Suits" the chapter was about. It was followed by the story with exclusive artwork and line-art of various "Mobile Suits" and characters. At the end, the chapter included a custom made "Mobile Suit" that was featured in the chapter. The end of Mobile Suit Gundam SEED Destiny Astray was not concluded in the manga itself but in the final "Shot: 026" of the photo-novels. All "shots" were collected and published into two volumes on June 26, 2006, and July 2006, respectively.

=== Gold-Frame ===
To promote the release of the 1/100 Scale "Gundam Astray Gold Frame Amatsu", a small manga chapter was produced with the "Gundam SEED Destiny Astray" label. It is a small story about Rondo Mina Sahaku and a mission to liberate a town from enemy forces. There's also a hint to where it got the Okitsu-no-Kagami equipment. As a side note, the "Gundam Astray Gold Frame Amatsu" was the only model produced from the "Gundam SEED Destiny Astray" brand.

== Media ==
The series has been compiled into four tankōbon volumes, but has not been translated into English.

=== Volume list ===
No.	Japanese release date	Japanese ISBN
1	January 26, 2005	4-04-713708-1
Scoop. 00 Prologue; Scoop. 01 Beginning Departure; Scoop. 02 South American Hero; Scoop. 03 My Ace; Scoop. 04 The World Starts Moving; Special Scoop. 01 Ed The Ripper; Special Drawing Scoop
2	July 26, 2005	4-04-713732-4
Scoop. 05 Sword Versus Sword; Scoop. 06 Conclusion of the SA War of Independence; Scoop. 07 Setona's Arrival♥; Scoop. 08 Weapons for the Sake of Peace; Scoop. 09 Impulse System; Scoop. 10 Conspirational Shadow
3	November 26, 2005	4-04-713788-X
Scoop. 11 G-Flight; Scoop. 12 Armory One Raide; Scoop. 13 Genesis Alpha; Scoop. 14 Testament - An Oath of God and Man; Scoop. 15 Regeneration; Scoop. 16 Fighting for the Truth
4	June 26, 2006	4-04-713808-8
Scoop. 17 Prelude to the Outbreak of War; Scoop. 18 Suspicion; Scoop. 19 A Concerto for a Stratagem; Scoop. 20 Declaration of the Heavens; Scoop. 21 Those Who See the Truth; Scoop. 22 Fighting for the Truth
