= After War Gundam X =

Japanese anime television series

機動新世紀ガンダムX (Kidō Shin Seiki Gandamu Ekkusu)
- Genre: Military science fiction, Mecha
- Created by: Hajime Yatate; Yoshiyuki Tomino
- Anime television series
- Directed by: Shinji Takamatsu
- Written by: Hiroyuki Kawasaki
- Music by: Yasuo Higuchi
- Studio: Sunrise
- Licensed by: NA: Sunrise
- Original network: ANN (TV Asahi)
- Original run: April 5, 1996 – December 28, 1996
- Episodes: 39
- Manga
- Written by: Kōichi Tokita
- Published by: Kodansha
- Magazine: Comic BomBom
- Original run: April 1996 – March 1997
- Volumes: 3
- Manga

After War Gundam X: Under the Moonlight
- Written by: Chitose Oojima
- Illustrated by: Yutaka Akatsu
- Published by: Kadokawa
- Magazine: Gundam Ace
- Original run: October 26, 2004 – September 26, 2006
- Volumes: 4
- Manga

Next Prologue: If I Am With You
- Written by: Hiroyuki Kawasaki
- Illustrated by: Kōichi Tokita
- Published by: Bandai Visual
- Published: March 23, 2018
- icon

After War Gundam X (Japanese: 機動新世紀ガンダムＸ(エックス), Hepburn: Kidō Shin Seiki Gandamu Ekkusu; lit. Mobile New Century Gundam X), is a 1996 Japanese anime television series and the seventh installment in the long running Gundam franchise that started in 1979, but takes place in an alternate timeline called After War (A.W.; アフターウォー or 戦後, Sengo). The series has 39 episodes, aired in Japan from April 5, 1996, to December 28, 1996, across TV Asahi's ANN stations. It was directed by Sunrise veteran Shinji Takamatsu (Mobile Suit SD Gundam, The Brave of Gold Goldran, School Rumble), and the screenplay was written by Hiroyuki Kawasaki.

== Plot ==
The year is A.W. 15. 15 years after the end of the 7th Space War which led to the catastrophic destruction of much of the world, the surviving residents of Earth try to make a living as best they can in the post-apocalyptic landscape. Mobile Suits and weapons left over from the war fall into the hands of civilians as well as other organizations on the planet. In an effort to keep the past from repeating itself, Jamil Neate brings together a crew of Vultures to search for Newtypes and protect them from being exploited. As they try to carry out this task, an old government rises from the ashes to try and unify the Earth as other forces slowly fan the flames of war once more between the newly formed New United Nations Earth and the Space Revolutionary Army. Now the crew of the Freeden face a multitude of enemies as they try to prevent another catastrophic war.

== Related media ==
=== Anime ===
The series 39 episodes aired in Japan from April 5, 1996, to December 28, 1996, across TV Asahi's ANN stations. It was directed by Shinji Takamatsu, and the screenplay was written by Hiroyuki Kawasaki. Character designs was by Nobuyoshi Nishimura while mecha designs were done by Kunio Okawara & Junya Ishigaki. Masaru Sato directed the art and the music was composed by Yasuo Higuchi. The series was released on DVD in North America in 2016 and had a special edition Blu-ray release in 2018, and a wider release on Blu-ray in 2020.

=== Manga ===
==== Adaptation ====
An adaptation of the anime was released in Comic BomBom. The manga by Kōichi Tokita ran from April 1996 to March 1997, outlasting the anime by three months, and was collected in three volumes. It was re-released with additional chapters focusing on Jamil Neate's past on January 26, 2022, as After War Gundam X Re:Master Edition.

==== Sequels ====
After War Gundam X: Under The Moonlight, also known as New Mobile Century Gundam X: Under the Moonlight, written by Chitose Oojima and illustrated by Yutaka Akatsu, with design cooperation from Takyuki Yanase, is the sequel manga to the After War Gundam X anime and was released between 2004 and 2006. The manga takes place seven years after the final episode in the series. The four-volume series stars a new cast of characters different from those in the anime, but includes the same designs and mechanical drawings of the ships and mobile suits featured in the anime. The series focuses on Rick Aller and a Newtype pilot from the 7th Space War named Kai, as well as a mysterious organization that has rebuilt D.O.M.E. after its destruction at the end of the After War Gundam X anime. Originally planned as only a short series in Gundam Ace, the popularity of the series caused it to be expanded and compiled into a four-volume manga series published by Kadokawa Shoten.

A one-shot sequel manga Next Prologue: If I Am With You (Anata to, Issho nara) supervised by the original anime's director Shinji Takamatsu, written by the anime's series composition writer Hiroyuki Kawasaki and illustrated by Kōichi Tokita was included as a bonus material for the Blu-ray release of the series on March 23, 2018. It focuses on Garrod and Tiffa after the end of the series. It was later included in the volume 3 of After War Gundam X Re:Master Edition manga, released on January 26, 2022.

== Reception ==
According to Japan's Weekly The Television magazine, the series' terrestrial broadcast ratings peaked at 6.2% with the first episode, then declined drastically over the first ten episodes, and averaged 4.3% during the first two quarters. A decision was made to cut the series short from the planned full year run to the final 39-episodes. In the key Kanto region, the show was moved in its TV Asahi broadcast from a Friday afternoon 5:00 PM timeslot to a Saturday morning 6:00 AM timeslot starting with episode 27. The show lasted 39 episodes of its intended 49.

Reception to After War Gundam X in the West has been mixed, with Lauren Orsini of Anime News Network stating, "Getting cancelled just might be the best thing that could have happened to After War Gundam X, because the difference in entertainment quality between its first and second halves is like night and day. When the show begins so sluggishly, there's simply no option but to pick up the pace for it to wrap up by the end of the year as ordered."

However, she did praise the later half of the show for "adapting into a master juggler, balancing the conflict's complexities in both the Earth and space theaters from the perspective of an increasingly likable main cast, with a concise final arc resolving neatly into a satisfying conclusion. Had it not been canceled, Gundam X might have risked overstaying its welcome. Instead, it showed itself out at the perfect time."

John Oppliger of AnimeNation gave a more negative review saying, "The biggest flaw of Gundam X was in simply creating a series with absolutely no likeable characters. Every character in the series was simply so self-absorbed and ill-tempered that watching the series was simply an exercise in aggravation tolerance that most fans quickly decided to forgo."

Carlos Ross of THEM Anime gave a mixed review calling the series "bland" and that "The plot seems like a drab retelling of a post-apocalyptic Gundam Wing as told by the recently lobotomized. As the only emotions really expressed are rage, desperation, and, oh yeah, angst, Gundam X strikes me as being just as anti-Gundam as Gundam Wing was, but in a different way. Gundam X focuses on nothing but despair...and as such, fails utterly to keep this reviewer's interest. Whereas Gundam, though at times saddening, was exciting, suspenseful, and full of life, Gundam X is completely bleak and inhuman, and loses the point that Gundam is actually less about the mecha than about humanity itself. Then again, when neither the mecha or the humans inspire anything ... why should we care?" He concluded that After War Gundam X was "not an absolutely terrible anime, but it's downright mediocre."

Preceded by Mobile Suit Gundam: The 08th MS Team	Gundam metaseries (production order); 1996	Succeeded by Gundam Wing: Endless Waltz
