= Kadokawa =

Kadokawa may refer to:

- Kadokawa Corporation, the holding company of the Kadokawa Group
  - Kadokawa Content Gate and Kadokawa Mobile, both former names for BookWalker
  - Kadokawa Future Publishing, a subsidiary of Kadokawa Corporation and the publishing side of Kadokawa with its brand companies
    - Kadokawa Shoten, a publishing house, or its subsidiaries; currently a brand company of Kadokawa Future Publishing
  - Kadokawa Light Novel Expo, an event held yearly by Kadokawa Corporation, dedicated to news for their various light novel series.
  - Kadokawa Daiei Studio, the film production branch, at various times called Kadokawa Daiei Motion Picture Co., Ltd., Kadokawa Herald Pictures, Inc., Kadokawa Shoten Pictures, Inc. and Kadokawa Pictures
  - 2024 cyberattack on Kadokawa and Niconico, cyberattack on Kadokawa
- Genyoshi Kadokawa, founder of the Kadokawa Group
- Haruki Kadokawa (角川 春樹; born 1942), former president of Kadokawa Shoten, son of Genyoshi
- Daisaku Kadokawa (門川 大作; born 1950), Japanese politician
