= Gundam =

Japanese media franchise

- Created by: Hajime Yatate; Yoshiyuki Tomino
- Original work: Mobile Suit Gundam (1979–80)
- Owner: Sunrise (Bandai Namco Filmworks)
- Years: 1979–present

Print publications
- Novels: See list
- Comics: See list
- Comic strips: Kadokawa; Kodansha; Shōgakukan; Gakken; Jitsugyo no Nihon Sha; Bandai Entertainment; ASCII Media Works; Newtype 100% Comics; MEDIA COMIX; Studio Orphee; Hero Adventure; Tokuma Shoten; Softbank Creative; Dengeki Hobby
- Magazines: Gundam Ace; HERO'S Web; Cyber Comics; Comic BomBom; Dengeki Hobby Magazine

Films and television
- Film: See below
- Television series: See below

Games
- Traditional: Gundam War Collectible Card Game; Gundam Cross War; Fusion Clashes: Gundam Battle-Rave; Mobile Suit Gundam Arsenal Base; Gundam Combat; Mobile Suit Gundam 0079: Card Builder; Mobile Suit Gundam 0083: Card Builder; Gundam Card Game; Gundam Chronicle Battleline
- Video games: See list

Miscellaneous
- Toys: Gunpla (plastic Gundam models); The Robot Spirits; S. H. Figuarts; Metal Build; Gundam Fix Figuration
- Genre: Science fiction Military science fiction Real robot Drama

Gundam (Japanese: ガンダムシリーズ, Hepburn: Gandamu Shirīzu; lit. Gundam Series) is a Japanese military science fiction media franchise. Created by Yoshiyuki Tomino and Sunrise (now a division of Bandai Namco Filmworks), the franchise features giant robots, or mecha, with the name "Gundam". The franchise began on April 7, 1979, with Mobile Suit Gundam, a TV series that defined the "real robot" mecha anime genre by featuring giant robots called mobile suits (including the original titular mecha) in a militaristic setting. The popularity of the series and its merchandise spawned a franchise that includes 50 TV series, films and OVAs as well as manga, novels and video games, along with a whole industry of plastic model kits known as Gunpla which makes up 90 percent of the Japanese character plastic-model market.

Academics in Japan have viewed the series as inspiration; in 2008, the virtual Gundam Academy was planned as the first academic institution based on an animated TV series. The popularity of the series and its merchandise spawned a multimedia franchise that includes over 50 TV series, films, and original video animations (OVAs), as well as manga, novels, and video games, along with a multimillion industry of plastic model kits known as Gunpla, which accounts for 90 percent of the Japanese character plastic model market. Academics in Japan have also taken interest in the series; in 2008, the virtual Gundam Academy was planned as the first academic institution based on an animated TV series.

As of March 2020, the franchise is fully owned by Bandai Namco Holdings through subsidiaries Sotsu and Sunrise. The Gundam franchise had grossed over $5 billion in retail sales by 2000. By 2022, the annual revenue of the Gundam franchise reached ¥101.7 billion per year, ¥44.2 billion of which was retail sales of toys and hobby items.

== Overview ==
=== Concept ===
RX-78-2 Gundam by Hajime Katoki

Mobile Suit Gundam was developed by animator Yoshiyuki Tomino and a changing group of Sunrise creators with the collective pseudonym of Hajime Yatate. The series was originally entitled Freedom Fighter Gunboy (or Gunboy) for the robot's gun, with teen boys as the primary target demographic. Early production had a number of references to freedom: the White Base, the casts home and ship, was originally "Freedom's Fortress", the Core Fighter was the "Freedom Wing" and the Gunperry was the "Freedom Cruiser". The Yatate team combined the English word "gun" with the last syllable of the word "freedom" to form the portmanteau Gundom. Tomino changed it to Gundam, suggesting a unit wielding a gun powerful enough to hold back enemies like a hydroelectric dam holding back water.

In keeping with the concept, Gundams are usually depicted as prototypes or limited-production with higher capabilities than mass-produced units, which are often referred to simply as mobile suits. Most Gundams are large, bipedal, humanoid vehicles controlled from a cockpit by a human pilot. The cockpit is regularly located in the torso with some notable exceptions, while the head serves as a camera to transmit images back to the cockpit. Throughout the series of shows, movies, and manga, a variety of different suits named Gundam appear with different designs and pilots specific to each series.

=== Genre & Innovation ===
Mobile Suit Gundam reportedly pioneered the real robot subgenre of mecha anime. In contrast to its super robot cousins, Mobile Suit Gundam attempted realism in its robot design and weaponry by running out of energy and ammunition or malfunctioning. Its technology is derived from actual science (such as Lagrange points and the O'Neill cylinder in space, and the use of helium-3 as an energy source) or feasible technology requiring only a few fictional elements to function (such as Minovsky Physics). The series itself has also been described as a space opera for its broad plots revolving around politics.

However, there is a secondary element to many series that runs counter to this image. Most of the series' protagonists are something called Newtypes, genetically advanced humans adapted for space. Newtypes have psychic abilities that enable them to do a variety of superhuman feats that differ from series to series. These range from an ability for instant understanding of other Newtypes' thoughts and desires, an enhanced sense perception that is regularly tied to piloting skills, and the capacity to utilize special mobile suits and weapons that tap into these newtype senses.

=== Timelines ===
The Gundam franchise is subdivided into "timelines" which act as their own self-contained continuities. The largest of these continuities is the Universal Century (UC), which began with the original show from 1979.

Alternate universes such as the Cosmic Era (e.g., Gundam SEED) and the Anno Domini era (e.g., Gundam 00) present standalone narratives. While they may take inspiration from each other, they ultimately represent their own chronology.

=== Spinoffs ===
SD Gundam employs a comedic style with chibi characters, debuting in the mid-1980s. Later series such as Gundam Build Fighters and Gundam Build Divers explore modern-day settings where battles between Gunpla (model kits) serve as the central narrative device.

== Media ==
=== TV series, films, and video ===
Except for Mobile Suit Gundam 00, which follows the current calendar era albeit three centuries in the future, all Gundam series are set in a fictional era, with a new calendar adopted after a drastic event or chain of events and typically involving a major conflict involving Earth and space colonies (and in some cases the Moon and terraformed planets). An exception are the Gundam Build timelines, which are set in an alternate present time where all other Gundam installments are fictional.

Name	Media	Release date	Timeline and year
Mobile Suit Gundam	TV series: 43 episodes	1979–1980	Universal Century (UC) 0079
Mobile Suit Gundam	Compilation movies: 3	1981–1982	Universal Century (UC) 0079
Mobile Suit Zeta Gundam	TV series: 50 episodes	1985–1986	Universal Century (UC) 0087
Mobile Suit Zeta Gundam	Compilation movies: 3	2005–2006	Universal Century (UC) 0087
Mobile Suit Gundam ZZ	TV series: 47 episodes	1986–1987	Universal Century (UC) 0088
Mobile Suit Gundam ZZ	OVA: 2 episodes	2009	Universal Century (UC) 0088
Mobile Suit Gundam: Char's Counterattack	Movie	1988	Universal Century (UC) 0093
Mobile Suit SD Gundam	Movies: 5	1988, 1989, 1991, 1993	
Mobile Suit SD Gundam	OVA: 9 episodes	1989–1991	
Mobile Suit SD Gundam	Compilation TV series: 8 episodes	1993	
Mobile Suit Gundam 0080: War in the Pocket	OVA: 6 episodes	1989	Universal Century (UC) 0079–80
Mobile Suit Gundam F91	Movie	1991	Universal Century (UC) 0123
Mobile Suit Gundam 0083: Stardust Memory	OVA: 13 episodes	1991–1992	Universal Century (UC) 0083
Mobile Suit Gundam 0083: Stardust Memory	Compilation movie	1992	Universal Century (UC) 0083
Mobile Suit Victory Gundam	TV series: 51 episodes	1993–1994	Universal Century (UC) 0153
Mobile Fighter G Gundam	TV series: 49 episodes	1994–1995	Future Century (FC) 60
Mobile Suit Gundam Wing	TV series: 49 episodes	1995–1996	After Colony (AC) 195
Mobile Suit Gundam Wing	Compilation specials: 4 episodes	1996	After Colony (AC) 195
Mobile Suit Gundam: The 08th MS Team	OVA: 12 episodes	1996–1999	Universal Century (UC) 0079
Mobile Suit Gundam: The 08th MS Team	Compilation movie	1998	Universal Century (UC) 0079
Mobile Suit Gundam: The 08th MS Team	Special	2013	Universal Century (UC) 0079
After War Gundam X	TV series: 39 episodes	1996	After War (AW) 15
Gundam Wing: Endless Waltz	OVA: 3 episodes	1997	After Colony (AC) 196
Gundam Wing: Endless Waltz	Compilation movie	1998	After Colony (AC) 196
Gundam: Mission to the Rise	Short film	1998	
Turn A Gundam	TV series: 50 episodes	1999–2000	Correct Century (CC) 2343–45
Turn A Gundam	Compilation movies: 2	2002	Correct Century (CC) 2343–45
G-Saviour	Live-action TV movie	2000	Universal Century (UC) 0223
Gundam Neo Experience 0087: Green Diver	Specialty format movie	2001	Universal Century (UC) 0087
Gundam Evolve	OVA: 15 episodes	2001–2007	
Mobile Suit Gundam SEED	TV series: 50 episodes	2002–2003	Cosmic Era (CE) 71–72
Mobile Suit Gundam SEED	Epilogue OVA short	2004	Cosmic Era (CE) 71–72
Mobile Suit Gundam SEED	Compilation specials: 3 episodes	2004	Cosmic Era (CE) 71–72
Superior Defender Gundam Force	TV series: 52 episodes	2003–2004	
Mobile Suit Gundam SEED MSV Astray	Promo OVA shorts: 2 episodes	2004	Cosmic Era (CE) 71
Mobile Suit Gundam MS IGLOO: The Hidden One Year War	OVA: 3 episodes	2004	Universal Century (UC) 0079
Mobile Suit Gundam SEED Destiny	TV series: 50 episodes	2004–2005	Cosmic Era (CE) 73–74
Mobile Suit Gundam SEED Destiny	TV special	2005	Cosmic Era (CE) 73–74
Mobile Suit Gundam SEED Destiny	Compilation specials: 4 episodes	2006	Cosmic Era (CE) 73–74
Mobile Suit Gundam MS IGLOO: Apocalypse 0079	OVA: 3 episodes	2006	Universal Century (UC) 0079
Mobile Suit Gundam SEED C.E. 73: Stargazer	ONA: 3 episodes	2006	Cosmic Era (CE) 73
Mobile Suit Gundam SEED C.E. 73: Stargazer	Compilation OVA: 1	2006	Cosmic Era (CE) 73
Mobile Suit Gundam 00	TV series: 50 episodes	2007–2009	Anno Domini (AD) 2307–08, 2312
Mobile Suit Gundam 00	Compilation OVA: 3 episodes	2009	Anno Domini (AD) 2307–08, 2312
Mobile Suit Gundam MS IGLOO 2: Gravity Front	OVA: 3 episodes	2008	Universal Century (UC) 0079
Mobile Suit Gundam Battlefield Record: Avant-Title	OVA	2009	Universal Century (UC) 0079
Ring of Gundam	Short film	2009	
Mobile Suit Gundam Unicorn	OVA: 7 episodes, 1 special episode	2010–2014	Universal Century (UC) 0096
Mobile Suit Gundam Unicorn	Compilation TV series: 22 episodes	2016	Universal Century (UC) 0096
SD Gundam Sangokuden Brave Battle Warriors	Movie	2010	
SD Gundam Sangokuden Brave Battle Warriors	TV series: 51 episodes	2010	
Mobile Suit Gundam 00 the Movie: A Wakening of the Trailblazer	Movie	2010	Anno Domini (AD) 2314
Model Suit Gunpla Builders Beginning G	Specials: 3 episodes	2010	Our Century
Mobile Suit Gundam AGE	TV series: 49 episodes	2011–2012	Advanced Generation (AG) 115–164
Mobile Suit Gundam AGE	Compilation OVA: 2 episodes	2013	Advanced Generation (AG) 115–164
Gundam Build Fighters	TV series: 25 episodes	2013–2014	Our Century
Gundam Build Fighters	Specials: 3 episodes	2014	Our Century
Mobile Suit Gundam-san	TV series: 13 episodes	2014	
Gundam Reconguista in G	TV series: 26 episodes	2014–2015	Regild Century (RG) 1014
Gundam Reconguista in G	Compilation movies: 5	2019–2022	Regild Century (RG) 1014
Gundam Build Fighters Try	TV series: 25 episodes	2014–2015	Our Century
Gundam Build Fighters Try	OVA	2016	Our Century
Mobile Suit Gundam: The Origin	OVA: 6 episodes	2015–2018	Universal Century (UC) 0068, 0071, 0074, 0077, 0078, 0079
Mobile Suit Gundam: The Origin	Compilation TV series: 13 episodes	2019	Universal Century (UC) 0068, 0071, 0074, 0077, 0078, 0079
Mobile Suit Gundam: Iron-Blooded Orphans	TV series: 50 episodes	2015–2017	Post Disaster (PD) 323, 325
Mobile Suit Gundam Thunderbolt	ONA: 8 episodes	2015–2017	Universal Century (UC) 0079
Mobile Suit Gundam Thunderbolt	Compilation movies: 2	2016–2017	Universal Century (UC) 0079
Mobile Suit Gundam: Twilight AXIS	ONA: 6 episodes	2017	Universal Century (UC) 0096
Mobile Suit Gundam: Twilight AXIS	Compilation movie	2017	Universal Century (UC) 0096
Gundam Build Fighters Battlogue	ONA: 5 episodes	2017	Our Century
Gundam Build Fighters: GM's Counterattack	ONA	2017	Our Century
Gundam Build Divers	Prologue ONA	2018	Our Century
Gundam Build Divers	TV series: 25 episodes	2018	Our Century
Mobile Suit Gundam Narrative	Movie	2018	Universal Century (UC) 0097
SD Gundam World Sangoku Soketsuden	ONA: 10 episodes	2019–2021	
Gundam Build Divers Re:Rise	ONA: 26 episodes	2019–2020	Our Century
Gundam Build Divers: Battlogue	ONA	2020	Our Century
Mobile Suit Gundam G40	ONA	2020	Universal Century (UC) 0079
Gundam Build Real	Live-action net drama: 6 episodes	2021	Our Century
SD Gundam World Heroes	ONA: 24 episodes	2021	
Mobile Suit Gundam Hathaway	Movies: 3	2021, 2026, TBA	Universal Century (UC) 0105
Gundam Breaker Battlogue	ONA: 6 episodes	2021	Our Century
Mobile Suit Gundam: Cucuruz Doan's Island	Movie	2022	Universal Century (UC) 0079
Mobile Suit Gundam: The Witch from Mercury	Prologue ONA	2022	Ad Stella (AS) 101
Mobile Suit Gundam: The Witch from Mercury	TV series: 24 episodes	2022–2023	Ad Stella (AS) 122
Gundam Build Metaverse	ONA: 3 episodes	2023	Our Century
Mobile Suit Gundam SEED Freedom	Movie	2024	Cosmic Era (CE) 75
Mobile Suit Gundam: Silver Phantom	VR movie	2024	Universal Century (UC) 0096
Gundam: Requiem for Vengeance	ONA: 6 episodes	2024	Universal Century (UC) 0079
Mobile Suit Gundam GQuuuuuuX	Compilation movie	2025	Alternate version of Universal Century (UC) 0079, 0085
Mobile Suit Gundam GQuuuuuuX	TV series: 12 episodes	2025	Alternate version of Universal Century (UC) 0079, 0085
Mobile Suit Gundam: Iron-Blooded Orphans Urdr-Hunt – Path of the Little Challenger	Compilation movie	2025	Post Disaster (PD) 323
Mobile Suit Gundam SEED Freedom Zero	Movie	2027	Cosmic Era (CE) 74
Mobile Suit Gundam RG: XARX-ZERO	TV series	2027	After Apocalypse (AA) 45
Gundam	Live-action movie	2027	TBA

=== Manga and novels ===
Manga adaptations of the Gundam series have been published in English in North America by a number of companies, such as Viz Media, Del Rey Manga and Tokyopop, and in Singapore by Chuang Yi. Notable entries include Mobile Suit Gundam: The Origin, written and illustrated by original series character designer Yoshikazu Yasuhiko. It is a retelling of the first series with additional flashbacks surrounding one of the series' main characters, Char Aznable.

=== Video games ===
Gundam has spawned over 80 video games for arcade, computer and console platforms, some with characters not found in other Gundam media. Some of the games, in turn, inspired spinoff novels and manga.

=== Gunpla ===
Primarily made of plastic, but sometimes paired with resin and metal detail parts, hundreds of Gundam scale plastic models, known as Gunpla, have been released since the early 1980s. They range in quality from toolless-build children's toy kits (Entry Grades) to hobbyist and museum-grade models, and most are in common scales such as 1:35, 1:48, 1:60, 1:100, or 1:144. Various Grades exist to target hobbyists, ranging from smaller-sized kits such as High Grade and Real Grade to larger Master Grade and Perfect Grade model kits. The Real Grade (RG) Gundam series combines the Master Grade's detailed inner structure with additional color separation, making the 1:144-scale series complex in design and compact in size, with the final goal of retooling a Gundam to what it might look like in real life, similar to the full-size Gundam statues.

Promotional 1:6 or 1:12 scale models are supplied to retailers and are not commercially available. For Gundam's 30th anniversary, a full-size RX-78-2 Gundam model was constructed and displayed at Gundam Front Tokyo in the Odaiba district; it was taken down on March 5, 2017. A new statue of the RX-0 Unicorn Gundam was erected at the same location, now renamed The Gundam Base Tokyo.

=== Other merchandise ===
Bandai, Gundam's primary licensee, produces a variety of products. Other companies produce unofficial merchandise, such as toys, models and T-shirts. Products include Mobile Suit in Action (MSiA) action figures and Gundam model kits in several scales and design complexities. Each series generally has its own set of products, MSiA and model lines such as Master Grade and High Grade Universal Century, which h may extend across series. The most popular action figure line has been the Gundam Fix series, which includes the mecha in the animated series, manga, novels and accessories to create an updated version. In addition to Master Grade and High Grade Gundams, Bandai released a 30th-anniversary series of Gundam models in 2010. After the introduction of the RG Gunpla line, Bandai released the Metal Build series in March 2011, beginning with the 00 Gundam.

== Impact ==
Gundam is a Japanese cultural icon and a multi-billion-yen annual business for Bandai Namco. Annual revenue for the franchise reached ¥54.5 billion by 2006, ¥80.2 billion by 2014, and ¥145.7 billion by 2024. Examples of its cultural ubiquity in the country include the issuing of Gundam stamps, an Agriculture Ministry employee being reprimanded for contributing to Japanese Wikipedia Gundam-related pages, and the Japan Self-Defense Forces code-naming its developing advanced personal-combat system Gundam. Based on a December 16, 2023, survey conducted by Nikkei Entertainment, the fanbase of Gundam within Japan has an average age of 42 years, and a male-to-female ratio that skews 90:10. The impact of Gundam in Japan has been compared to the impact of Star Wars in the United States.

== See also ==
- Bandai Museum
- Mobile Suit Gundam
- Gundam (fictional robot)
- SD Gundam
