= Hajime Yatate =

Pseudonym for the Sunrise animation staff

Hajime Yatate (矢立 肇, Yatate Hajime) is a pseudonym for the collective contributions of the Sunrise animation staff.

== Name ==
"Hajime Yatate" is considered to be named after a quote of Matsuo Bashō's Oku no Hosomichi:

是を矢立の初めとして、行く道なほ進まず (Kore o yatate no hajime toshite, Ikumichi naho susumazu)
This was the first time I used my travel writing implements, and I was still reluctant to venture farther.

== Credited series ==
This collective entity is credited as the "Original Creator" (原作, gensaku) of most original Sunrise works, including, but not limited to:

- The various Gundam series
- The Yuusha Series (1990-1997) with Takara Tomy
- Trider G7 (1980)
- Aura Battler Dunbine (1983)
- Choriki Robo Galatt (1984)
- Yoroiden Samurai Troopers AKA Ronin Warriors (1988)
- Mashin Hero Wataru (1988)
- Mama wa Shōgaku 4 Nensei (1992)
- The Vision of Escaflowne (1996)
- Outlaw Star (1998)
- Cowboy Bebop (1998)
- Infinite Ryvius (1999)
- The Big O (1999)
- Z-Mind (1999)
- Witch Hunter Robin (2002)
- Machine Robo Rescue (2003)
- My-HiME (2004)
- Idolmaster: Xenoglossia (2007)
- The Girl Who Leapt Through Space (2009)
- Sacred Seven (2011)
- Love Live!
  - Love Live! School Idol Project (2013)
  - Love Live! Sunshine!! (2016)
  - Love Live! Nijigasaki High School Idol Club (2020)
  - Love Live! Superstar!! (2021)

== See also ==
Collective pseudonyms under Toei Company and Toei Animation:

- Saburō Yatsude
- Izumi Todo
