= Jun Kasama =

Japanese voice actor (born 1984)

- 笠間淳
- Born: April 10, 1984 (age 42); Hiroshima Prefecture, Japan
- Occupation: Voice actor
- Years active: 2010–present
- Agent: Tokyo Actor's Consumer's Cooperative Society
- Height: 170 cm (5 ft 7 in)

Jun Kasama (笠間淳, Kasama Jun; born April 10, 1984) is a Japanese voice actor.

== Filmography ==
=== Anime television series ===
2013

- Arpeggio of Blue Steel, Soldier C

2014

- Space Dandy, Villagers

2015

- Cute High Earth Defense Club Love!, Shintarō Tanaka
- Gate, Soldier and Chief
- The Heroic Legend of Arslan, Soldier
- Comet Lucifer, Announcer and security guard
- Star-Myu, Photographer
- Valkyrie Drive Mermaid, Researcher

2016

- Active Raid, Nakayama, Male B
- Prince of Stride, Live Commentary
- Flying Witch, Uncle C
- Alderamin on the Sky, Agora
- Regalia: The Three Sacred Stars, Soldier
- Taboo Tattoo, Carter
- BBK/BRNK, Airport staff and hotel guests
- ClassicaLoid, Workers
- Lostorage incited WIXOSS, Suzuko's father
- Time Bokan 24, Chuck
- Nanbaka, Father of Rock

2017

- Saga of Tanya the Evil, Willibald König
- Re:Creators, Convenience store clerk
- Puzzle & Dragons X, Guild Dragon Caller
- Knight's & Magic, Kuchil, Dwarf B, Noble B
- Vatican Miracle Examiner, Hendrick
- Kaito x Ansa, Shinjoume, the Anchor Hat Shop
- The Idolmaster SideM, Amehiko Kuzunoha
- Detective Conan, A male

2018

- A Place Further than the Universe, Manager Hayashi
- Dame×Prince, Thug
- The Ryuo's Work Is Never Done!, Audience A
- You Don't Know Gunma Yet, Todoroki
- Last Hope, Soldier
- High School DxD, Hercules
- The Disastrous Life of Saiki K., Silent Cyborg Protagonist
- Gundam Build Divers, Kujo Kyoya
- Golden Kamuy, Okada
- Layton's Mystery Journey, Oswald Blames
- Cells at Work!, Secretory cell leader and red blood cell
- Miss Caretaker of Sunohara-sou, Store clerk and costumer
- Tsukumogami Kashimasu, Katō Kiyomasa
- Back Street Girls, Gokudols Michael
- Bloom Into You, Teacher
- The Idolmaster SideM: Wake Atte Mini!, Amehiko Kuzunoha
- Merc Storia: The Apathetic Boy and the Girl in a Bottle, Gulshan
- Ms. Vampire Who Lives in My Neighborhood, Male Customer A
- A Certain Magical Index III, Captain

2019

- Magical Girl Spec-Ops Asuka, Konstantin Asimov
- That Time I Got Reincarnated as a Slime, Adventurers
- Ao-chan Can't Study!, Teacher
- Isekai Quartet, Villibald Koenig
- Inazuma Eleven: Orion no Kokuin, Domelgo Dominguez
- Ahiru no Sora, Hiroshi Kutsuki and Doctor

2020

- Somali and the Forest Spirit, Town Residen
- Haikyuu!! TO THE TOP, Aran Ojiro
- Boruto: Naruto Next Generations, Mugino
- Noblesse, Krans
- Our Last Crusade or the Rise of a New World, Nameless
- Ikebukuro West Gate Park, Thug

2021

- Full Dive: This Ultimate Next-Gen Full Dive RPG Is Even Shittier than Real Life!, Narration
- Cardfight!! Vanguard overDress, Touya's Father
- The Great Jahy Will Not Be Defeated!, Policeman
- Life Lessons with Uramichi Oniisan, Narration
- Demon Slayer: Kimetsu no Yaiba – Mugen Train
- The Fruit of Evolution: Before I Knew It, My Life Had It Made, Middle-aged Man, Bosco Dunn, Bearded Jockey, and Tsuyoshi Oyama

2022

- Orient, Keigo Kakizaki
- Eternal Boys, Renji Ii

2023

- Revenger, Raizo Kurima
- Handyman Saitou in Another World, Kisurugi
- Reborn to Master the Blade: From Hero-King to Extraordinary Squire, Wayne
- Helck, Gauriul

2024

- The Strongest Tank's Labyrinth Raids: Heavily Armed Tank's Rare Skills Push Him Out of the Hero Party, Rude
- Snack Basue, Miki Higashi
- Tasūketsu: Fate of the Majority, Ryohei Sudo
- Kinnikuman: Perfect Origin Arc, Brocken Jr., Brockenman
- Blue Lock Season 2, Kento Cho

2026

- Rooster Fighter, Yuji
- Magical Sisters LuluttoLilly, Keiichi Nonoyama
- Gals Can't Be Kind to Otaku!?, Genichirō Ijichi
- Witch Hat Atelier, Utowin

=== Anime films ===
- Maquia: When the Promised Flower Blooms, (2018) Soldier
- Saga of Tanya the Evil: The Movie (2019), Wilibald Koenig
- Demon Slayer: Kimetsu no Yaiba the Movie: Mugen Train (2020)
- The Laws of the Universe: The Age of Elohim (2021), Lucifer
- Ensemble Stars!! Road to Show!! (2022), HiMERU
- Isekai Quartet the Movie: Another World (2022), Wilibald Koenig
- The First Slam Dunk (2022), Hisashi Mitsui
- Eternal Boys NEXT STAGE (2023), Renji Ii
- 100 Meters (2025), Nigami

=== Original net animation (ONA) ===
- Youjo Senki: The Saga of Tanya the Evil (2017), Wilibald Koenig
- Kuruneko (2017), Narration
- Obsolete (2019), Roadmaster
- Gundam Build Divers Re:Rise (2020), Kyouya Kujo
- Gundam Build Divers Battlogue (2020), Kyouya Kujo
- Tiger & Bunny 2 (2022), Ansei Hedeman
- BASTARD!! Heavy Metal, Dark Fantasy (2023), Jorg Fishes
- Gundam Build Metaverse (2023), Kyouya Kujo
- Hundred Note (2023), Kareyanagi Joudo
- Honkai: Star Rail Short Animation (2024), Sam

=== Dubbing ===
Live-action

- Anyone but You, as Ben (Glen Powell)
- Diary of a Night Watchman, as Eunuch Song
- Secret Invasion as Gravik (Kingsley Ben-Adir)

Animation

- The Powerpuff Girls
- Hotel Transylvania 3: Summer Vacation as Chichi
- Over the Moon as Howie

=== Video games ===
2016

- The Idolmaster SideM (2016–2023), Amehiko Kuzunoha

2017

- RXN Thunder God, Masachika Kansei

2018

- Caravan Stories, Galgogo
- Quiz RPG: The World of Mystic Wiz, Sid Harlock
- Tokyo Afterschool Summoners, Tangrisnir
- Kotodaman (2018- 2024), Wong-Kowloon, Soshitsu, Ptah, Wong Kowloon, and Son Shimpu

2019

- Kaikan Phrase Climax-Next Generation, Yukihiko Todo

2020

- Ensemble Stars!! Basic/Music (2020–2024), HiMERU
- Grand Summoners, Eagle
- Show by Rock!! Fes A Live, Monmon
- Live A Hero!, Rakuta Alkiba
- Puyo Puyo!! Quest (Aran Ojiro)
- Dragon Quest Rivals, Tobias and The Confused Dragon
- The Saga of Tanya the Evil: The Mage Will Fight, Wilbert Koenig

2021

- The Idolmaster Poplinks, Amehiko Kuzunoha
- Jack Jeanne, Kai Mutsumi
- I Was Reincarnated into Another World and Became a Legendary Hero!?, Werner
- Lost Judgment, Tesso
- Brown Dust, Yan
- Demon Slayer: Kimetsu no Yaiba – The Hinokami Chronicles
- The Thousand Musketeers: Rhodoknight, Siegbraut

2022

- New Nobunaga's Ambition, Masamune Date
- Fate/Grand Order (2022 - 2023, Huang Feihu
- Star Ocean: The Divine Force, Geralt Il Vair

2023

- Monster Universe, Sinan
- Yumekuro: The Forgotten Black Fairy (2023–2024), Shiira
- Eikyuu Shounen Side Project -Twilight no Spica, Renji Ii
- Technoroid Unison Heart, Saku
- Nobunaga's Ambition: Departure, (2023-) Nobuyuki Sanada, Nobuyuki Sanada, Motochika Chosokabe
- Ensemble Training!!, HiMERU
- Mobile Suit Gundam: Arsenal Base, Kyoya Kujo
- Cupid Parasite -Sweet & Spicy Darling., Eli Omar

2024

- Honkai: Star Rail, Sam
- Pokémon Masters EX, Gen
- Ex Astris, Roy
- Granblue Fantasy, Abramelin
- Gran Saga, Isaac
- Hundred Heroes, Lakian Arkathies Fawud
- My9Swallows Topstars League, Ren Nakaooji
- Touken Ranbu, Unshou

2025

- Granblue Fantasy, Pijiu
- Towa and the Guardians of the Sacred Tree, Akazu
- Octopath Traveler 0, Phenn
- Olympia Soirée Catharsis, Aogumo
