= King's Raid: Successors of the Will =

Japanese anime television series

キングスレイド 意志を継ぐものたち (Kingusu Reido Ishi o Tsugu Mono-tachi)
- Created by: Vespa
- Anime television series
- Directed by: Makoto Hoshino
- Written by: Megumi Shimizu
- Music by: Masahiro Tokuda
- Studio: OLM; Sunrise Beyond
- Licensed by: Crunchyroll: SA / SEA: Muse Communication
- Original network: TV Tokyo, TVA, TVO, AT-X
- Original run: October 3, 2020 – March 27, 2021
- Episodes: 26

King's Raid: Successors of the Will (Japanese: キングスレイド 意志を継ぐものたち, Hepburn: Kingusu Reido Ishi o Tsugu Mono-tachi) is a Japanese anime television series adaptation of the video game of the same name. It is produced by Sunrise Beyond and aired from October 2020 to March 2021.

== Plot ==
A hundred years ago, King Kyle defeated the Demon King Angmund, leading to an age of peace for the kingdom of Orberia. Now, the fate of the apprentice knight Kasel takes a turn when word arrives of demons appearing in his region. Klaus, a fellow trainee who is like his older brother, goes off to investigate and never returns. The Great Sage Dominicus sends Kasel, along with a team of trusted allies, to find his friend and to seek out a sealed holy sword that can save the land.

== Characters ==
Riheet
Voiced by: Ryōta Suzuki (Japanese); Zeno Robinson (English)
A dark elf belonging to the mercenary faction "Black Edge". He gets hired by Councilor Moriham of Orvelia to investigate demonic activity near the royal city, but he and the Black Edge are secretly plotting to betray him and take control of Orbellia as revenge for the discrimination dark elves have endured.
When the Black Edge are sent to investigate Gallua Plains in search for demonic activity, the whole squad except for Riheet are killed by the dark wizard Malduk, causing Riheet to end his allegiance to the Orvelian army and, on the advice of Maria, to search for the magic sword created by Illya, King Kyle's half-sister. He later discovers that he is a distant descendant from Illya and that she never created a fake sword, but rather, a techno-magical device that would protect its wielder from the Dark Lord's power and she was villainized in death by corrupt nobles as discrimination against dark elves.
Realizing that he has nothing left to lose, he joins Scarlet in her fight to obtain the holy sword Eia and kill Malduk, a goal he barely achieves after reaching the World Tree. During the final battle with Angmund, Riheet gives the device created by Illya to Kasel, who barely manages to defeat Angmund and save his father. With the Dark Lord defeated, Scarlet offers a title of nobility to Riheet, who instead requests to reveal the truth about Illya to his fellow dark elves, hoping to promote true peace between them and Orvelia.
Ripine
Voiced by: Yoshino Nanjō (Japanese); Lauren Landa (English)
Riheet's younger sister and second-in-command of the "Black Edge". Utterly devoted to her brother's, Ripine will do whatever it takes to help him achieve his goals, even if that means killing members of her own group. She barely survives a direct confrontation against Malduk and only reunites with her brother after Angmund's forces have been defeated.
Kasel
Voiced by: Kaito Ishikawa (Japanese); Aleks Le (English)
A recruit training to become a Guardian-Knight of Orvelia. Despite his lack of discipline, he is determined to protect the people he cares about. Upon hearing that his friend Kasel was last seen fighting demons in the King's forest, he rushes out to save him. His journey leads him to Dominicus, who reveals that Kasel is the son of the legendary King Kyle and the only one who can stop the resurrection of the Dark Lord Angmund by finding the Eia, the sword that defeated Angmund a hundred years ago.
As time passes, Kasel becomes capable of using the holy power manifested by Eia, but this power causes Kasel to doubt his own ability to protect the people he cares about. He considers completing his journey alone in a well-intentioned attempt to protect his friends, but Frey convinces him to let his friends join him.
Although he is shocked by the revelation that his father has become Angmund's physical vessel, Kasel becomes committed to save him. During the final battle, he obtains both Eia and a pendant created by Illya and combines them both to save his father, allowing his soul to rest in peace. With the crisis over, Kasel finally becomes an official Guardian-Knight but instead of remaining stationed on Orvelia, he chooses to go on another journey with his friends.
Frey
Voiced by: Ai Kakuma (Japanese); Kira Buckland (English)
A priestess for the Holy Church of Orvelia. She knows Kasel and Clause since childhood and has come to care deeply for them. Upon learning that Kasel might die in his fight against the Dark Lord, Frey begins fearing for his life and it isn't until Kasel himself comforts her that she truly decides to stay by his side. During the final battle with Angmund, Frey finally admits she is in love with Kasel, a motivation that allows Kasel to defeat the Dark Lord. With the battle over, she once again chooses to accompany Kasel and his friends on another adventure.
Cleo
Voiced by: Ari Ozawa (Japanese); Kayli Mills (English)
A young sorceress specializing in fire magic, trained by Dominicus. She has been described as having a lot of potential but lacking discipline. Her magic improves significantly throughout her journey, and she gets advice from various people to continue to support her friends in any way she can. Once Angmund is defeated, she once again chooses to join Kasel in another adventure.
Roi
Voiced by: Kengo Kawanishi (Japanese); Jordan Reynolds (English)
Formerly a member of the mercenary group "Flugel", Roi was the sole survivor when his teammates were turned into undead. He was rescued by Dominicus, who allowed him to stay at the Tower of the Sage in exchange for Roi extended his services to Dominicus later. Roi would ultimately become Cleo's bodyguard and a member of Kasel's expedition. With the defeat of Angmund, he again chooses to join Kasel on another adventure.
Clause
Voiced by: Takuma Terashima (Japanese); Mark Whitten (English)
A veteran Guardian-Knight of Orvelia. He has known Kasel and Frey since childhood. He is presumed missing-in-action, prompting Kasel and Frey to attempt to save him. He joins Scarlet's expedition to investigate demonic activity on the Gallua Plains and later contributes in the final battle against Angmund, giving Kasel enough time to defeat the Dark Lord. He remains stationed on Orvelia while Kasel and his friends embark on another adventure.
Theo
Voiced by: Shun Horie (Japanese); Alejandro Saab (English)
A knight for the nation of Grey. After learning that Malduk turned the deceased king of Grey into an undead, he exiled Malduk.
Dominicus
Voiced by: Ryotaro Okiayu (Japanese); J. Michael Tatum (English)
A sage who has lived for over a hundred years, using his magic to keep his youthful appearance. He became acquainted with Kyle and Illya and made the attempt to protect Kyle's son, Kasel, by moving him away from the capital and give him a normal life. However, when Kasel's mother was killed by demons, Dominicus would seek out Kasel and reveal his origins to him.
Malduk
Voiced by: Kentaro Ito (Japanese); Doug Erholtz (English)
A dark wizard and former servant of the Dark Lord Angmond. He joins forces with Maria to resurrect his master. He used to be a sorcerer for the human kingdom of Grey, but his obsession with necromancy led him to raise the dying king as an undead, an action that caused Malduk to be exiled. Bitter, he pledged allegiance to Angmond and dedicated himself to the Dark Lord's resurrection. In his campaign, he slaughters the entire "Black Edge", causing Riheet, the lone survivor, to swear vengeance against him. He later attempts to steal the holy sword Eia from the World tree, only to be killed by Riheet.
Kyle
Voiced by: Masaya Matsukaze (Japanese); Bryce Papenbrook (English)
The legendary king who saved the world from the Dark Lord Angmund a hundred years before the events of the series. He was the younger adoptive brother of the dark elf Illya and wielder of the holy sword Eia, granted to him by Lua, goddess of light, as the only weapon that could destroy Angmund. However, during his fight with Angmund, the Holy Sword lost its power and Angmund corrupted Kyle's mind and took control of his body to resurrect himself a hundred years later. To ensure the survival of his bloodline, Dominicus cast a spell that placed Kyle's wife in a deep sleep. When she awakened, she gave birth to Kyle's only child, Kasel.
Angmund is later restored to life using Kyle's body and attempts to kill Kasel, who uses both Eia and a techno-magical device created by Illya to destroy Angmund's armor and free his father. Kyle reveals that his own power was insufficient to destroy Angmund, which is why he begged Lua, the goddess of light, to give Eia to his son, hoping that he would succeed where Kyle himself failed. Kyle's soul departs for the afterlife, but not before expressing love for his son.
Maria
Voiced by: Sakura Nakamura (Japanese); Dawn M. Bennett (English)
A former saintist dedicated to the worship of Lua, the goddess of light. She had known Kyle since he was a prince and supported the efforts of Illya to create magical equipment that would protect Kyle from the Dark Lord's power. Unfortunately, during the Battle of Gallua Plains, Kyle was corrupted by the Dark Lord's power and trapped in the same dimensional rift the Dark Lord was, while Illya was killed by demons while trying to help Kyle. Believing that the goddess Lua had abandoned her friends in their time of greatest need, Maria renounced her loyalty to Lua and became devoted to Leia, the goddess of darkness. Once Kyle is resurrected as the holder of the Dark Lord's soul, however, Maria begins conspiring against the Angmund and helping Kasel in the very slim hope of saving Kyle. During the final battle, she buys enough time for Kasel to use Eia and the pendant created by Illya to destroy Angmund's armor and save his father. In Kyle's final moments, she realizes that Kyle willingly sacrificed his life to protect Eia and pass it on to his son, hoping that Kasel would succeed where Kyle failed. After Kyle dies, Maria leaves for parts unknown, taking all her sins with her.
Scarlet
Voiced by: Mitsuki Nakae (Japanese); Caitlin Glass (English)
Princess of Orvelia and commander-in-chief of Orvelia's Guardian-Knights. She formally requests assistance from the Black Edge to fight the demon army threatening Orvelia and attempts to establish a good relationship with the Black Edge's leader, Riheet. She is horrified upon learning that Orvelia secret oppressed dark elfkind and that, as revenge, Riheet wanted to take over Orvelia and oppress its citizens as retribution.
Choosing to atone for her kingdom's sins, she asks for Riheet's help in finding the holy sword Eia and safeguarding it from the Dark Lord. After Angmund is defeated, Scarlet offers Riheet a title of nobility, a decision that Riheet puts on hold, as he embarks on his own attempt to promote peace between Orvelia and dark elves.
Demia
Voiced by: Mika Kanda (Japanese); Morgan Berry (English)
An elite Guardian-Knight of Orvelia. She contributes in the final battle against Angmund, protecting Scarlet while Kasel and his friends separate Angmund from Eia. With the Dark Lord defeated, she agrees to help Scarlet in changing Orvelia for the better.
Lorraine
Voiced by: Emi Hirayama (Japanese); Jessica Straus (English)
Selene's master and one of King Kyle's oldest allies in the war against the Dark Lord Angmund. A witch with power over the forest of Elladora, she was also given the authority to undo one of the seals placed upon the Holy Sword Eia. Upon hearing that Kasel is the son of King Kyle, she agrees to undo her seal so that he can claim the sword. She is one of Maria's oldest friends and is disappointed to learn that she sold her soul to Leia, the goddess of darkness, out of grief for Kyle's apparent death. With the Dark Lord finally defeated, Lorraine continues her watch over the forest of Elladora, with Pavel at her side.
Selene
Voiced by: Juri Nagatsuma (Japanese); Laura Post (English)
Princess of the elves and a talented archer. She distrusts humans but is forced to allow Kasel and his friends across her forest to reach her master, Lorraine. Upon watching Kasel show respect to the creatures of the forest, she reevaluates her opinions on humans and comes to believe that they can be genuinely good people. She later joins Kasel's group on their journey to the World Tree. She contributes in the final battle against Angmund, helping Kasel separate Eia from the Dark Lord. With the battle over, Selena admits her own feelings for Kasel but chooses to withhold them out of respect for Frey.
Ophelia
Voiced by: Takako Tanaka (Japanese); G.K. Bowes (English)
Royal astrologist of Orvelia.
Jane
Voiced by: Moe Toyota (Japanese); Megan Harvey (English)
Princess of the kingdom of Grey. She is horrified upon learning that her father, the king, had been turned into an undead by the sorcerer Malduk, which led to Malduk's exile.
Reina
Voiced by: Yūki Takada (Japanese); Felecia Angelle (English)
The daughter of a noble from the Empire. She refused to marry for political reasons, ran away from home and became a mercenary to live life in her own terms. When she briefly takes up residence at a village inhabited by dark elves, she meets Kasel and his friends during their journey to Windfall Snow Mountain and accepts their help in solving a series of mysterious disappearances. Once the mystery is solved, Reina advises Kasel to stop being so harsh on himself and to accept help from his friends every once in a while. With the battle against Angmund over, Reina is free to continue her travels.
Elise
Voiced by: Riho Iida (Japanese); Erica Mendez (English)
A young girl who lost her parents to a demon attack. She has trouble making friends until she meets Frey, who encourages her love for collecting flowers and baking. She later reunites with her father Johann and befriends Scarlet. Once Angmund is defeated, she and her father depart from their village and decide to travel the world together.

== Release ==
On April 9, 2020, an anime television series adaptation was announced, and aired from October 3, 2020, to March 27, 2021, on TV Tokyo. It features a story different from the game's original plot as well as original characters voiced by Ryōta Suzuki and Yoshino Nanjo. The series is animated by OLM and Sunrise Beyond, with Makato Hoshino serving as director, Megumi Shimizu serving as series composer, and Tatsuya Arai designing the characters. Masahiro Tokuda is composing the series' music. The cast members of the Japanese version of the game reprise their roles. The opening theme songs are "legendary future" by fripSide (episodes 1-13), and "Eclipse" by DREAMCATCHER (Note: While the song itself is made by Dreamcatcher, it's still attributed to fripSide in the intros 14-26. This is likely an oversight from the production team, and this can only be observed in the English dubbing.)(episodes 14-26), while the ending theme songs are "SticK Out" by KOTOKO (episodes 1-13), and "One Wish" by Riho Iida (episodes 14-26). Funimation acquired the series, and are streaming the series on its website in North America and the British Isles. The series ran for 26 episodes. On November 28, 2020, it was announced that the series' Blu-ray release has been canceled.

No.	Title	Directed by	Written by	Original release date
1	"The Demons that Lurk in the Moonlight"; Transliteration: "Tsukiyo ni Ugomeku Mamonotachi" (Japanese: 月夜に蠢く魔物たち)	Makoto Hoshino	Megumi Shimizu	October 3, 2020
The mercenary group "Black Edge" have taken residence at the royal city of Orvelia and their leader Riheet is invited into the castle by Councilor Moriham, who suggests using the Black Edge to investigate the reports of demonic activity in the King's Forest. Although the royal court of Orvelia rejects the Black Edge's assistance, Riheet discuss plans to take over the nation with his fellow dark elves. Meanwhile, Clause and his squad are tasked with investigating the demons lurking in the forest. The squad falls victim an ambush and multiple soldiers are killed, with only Clause left to hold the line while a single soldier returns to Orvelia to report what happened. Concerned for his friend, Kasel and Frey rush out to save him.
2	"The Truth, Revealed"; Transliteration: "Akasareru Shinjitsu" (Japanese: 明かされる真実)	Satoshi Takafuji	Megumi Shimizu	October 10, 2020
Kasel and Frey reach the King's Forest and find the corpses of the soldiers killed by the demons. They are unable to find Clause, however, before they are attacked by demons and their leader, a witch. Suddenly, they are saved the Black Edge, who inform the duo of their mission. Kasel and Frey are found by the sorceress Cleo and her companion Roi and taken to the flying tower of the Sage Dominicus, who has found the injured Clause and nursed him back to health. The next day, Dominicus informs Kasel that he is the son of the legendary King Kyle, who defeated the Dark Lord Angmond a hundred years ago. Meanwhile, Riheet reports his findings to the royal court of Orvelia and Moriham uses this outcome to propose an alliance with the elves and the orcs, like Kyle did a hundred years ago. Secretly, however, Morihem plans to usurp power from the court and become chancellor of Orbellia.
3	"What the Predecessors Left Behind"; Transliteration: "Senjin no Nokoshita Mono" (Japanese: 先人の遺したもの)	Tatsunari Koyano	Megumi Shimizu	October 17, 2020
Dominicus reveals to Kasel and Frey that he knew Kyle and his adopted half-sister Illya a hundred years ago. When he was only a prince, Kyle was forced to take up arms against an army of demons that laid siege against the kingdom of Orvelia. When he became king, he met Kasel's mother and obtained the Holy Sword Eia as a gift from Lua, the goddess of light, to defeat Angmond. While Kyle fought against Angmond, Dominicus placed Kyle's pregnant wife on a magical sleep that would last almost a hundred years to ensure the survival of Kyle's bloodline. Although the battle against Angmond was won, Illya died before she could help Kyle and her attempts to recreate the Holy Sword Eia with techno-magic were seen as heretical by the kingdom of Orbellia. As a result, dark elves were exiled from Orvelia and endured a century of racism and discrimination. Meanwhile, Kyle's wife was killed by demons, leaving Kasel, Kyle's son, as the only survivor. Dominicus believes that recent demonic activity could be a sign of Angmond's impending return, which is why he tasks Kasel and Frey to unite the elves and orcs and remove the seal on the Holy Sword Eia so they can use it against Angmond. He also tasks Cleo and Roi to accompany them in their journey.
4	"The Forest and the Elves"; Transliteration: "Erufu no Sumau Mori" (Japanese: エルフの棲まう森)	Masashi Abe	Rie Koshika	October 24, 2020
Kasel and his friends make it to the forest of Elladora, where they meet Selene, princess of the elves. Despite her distrust of humans, she has orders to bring them to her master, Lorraine, who will give the humans information about the Holy Sword Eia. On their journey across the forest, Kasel and his friends become friends with a little treant named Necha. Unfortunately, they are attacked by a plant demon that kills Necha, an act that enrages Kasel and causes him to kill the plant demon as brutally as possible, just as Lorraine arrives to see the humans.
5	"The Power of the Holy Sword"; Transliteration: "Kiyoshi Ken no Chikara" (Japanese: 聖剣の力)	Tatsunari Koyano	Rie Koshika	October 31, 2020
Kasel and his friends spend the night in Lorraine's home and bury Necha's sprout in the place he used to play at. Selene watches Kasel pay his respects to Necha, which causes his seed to bloom into a sprout. Surprised by Kasel's kindness, Selene admits to Lorraine that while she still distrusts humans, she is willing to believe some of them are genuinely good people. Lorraine is convinced that Selene indeed saw goodness in Kasel, removes one of the seals on the Holy Sword Eia and tells Kasel that he must travel to Ogria Mountain to ask the leader of the orcs to remove the second seal. On their way out of the forest, however, they are attacked by the same plant demon that had killed Necha, only this time, Kasel is able to kill it without succumbing into vengeful anger. The group stumbles upon the same witch that had fought the Black Edge in the king's forest. During the battle, Cleo reveals that Kasel is the son of King Kyle, and this causes the witch to warn Kasel that he will become Lua's puppet the same way Kyle did. Meanwhile, back at Orvelia, Councilor Moriham has received authorization by the nobles to use the Black Edge against the demon army. Moriham sees this as an opportunity to turn Riheet into a knight.
6	"Maven of Fire"; Transliteration: "Honō no Tsukaite" (Japanese: 炎の使い手)	Shigeru Fukase	Megumu Sasano	November 7, 2020
On their way to Ogria Mountain, Kasel and their friends reach a nearby town to resupply and make money. Roi goes to the market to sell some items while Cleo finds employment for Kasel, Frey and herself at a restaurant in the outskirts of town. The owner, Madam Volf, makes the trio work to repair the restaurant and explains to Cleo about her dislike of magic. Long ago, the town was hit by a war and many people died, leaving only Madam Volf as the only survivor. Suddenly, the restaurant is attacked by demons and the only way to destroy them is with fire, but Cleo is reluctant to use magic because of Madam Volf's dislike of magic, until Madam Volf realizes she has been letting the past dictate her life and allows Cleo to use magic and save her friends. With the restaurant repaired, the group earns enough money to continue their journey.
7	"The Target of Hatred"; Transliteration: "Nikushimi no Mukau Saki" (Japanese: 憎しみの向かう先)	Satoshi Takafuji	Megumi Shimizu	November 14, 2020
Scarlet, Princess of Orvelia, formally requests that the Black Edge cooperate with Orvelia's military to facilitate a defense against the demons. Riheet accepts the request, seeing it as a good opportunity to subvert the interests of Orvelia from the inside. Tamm, a young member of the Black Edge, is attacked by a group of thugs and Moriham believes the thugs were sent by Ziero, a noble who hates dark elves. Riheet and Ripine corner Ziero with evidence of his actions and Riheet threatens to kill him and only relents when Ziero's father begs for the life of his son. Meanwhile, the witch, named Maria, meets up with her acquaintance, Malduk, a former servant of the Dark Lord. As the next step in their goal to resurrect the Dark Lord, Maria and Malduk agree to steal the Holy Sword Eia.
8	"Memories in the Eyes"; Transliteration: "Hitomi no Kioku" (Japanese: 瞳の記憶)	Masashi Abe	Megumu Sasano	November 21, 2020
Kasel and his friends reach a town devastated by demons and agree to help the townsfolk rebuild their homes. Frey befriends a little orphaned girl named Elise, who initially rejects Frey's attempts at bonding but ultimately grows closer to her and the other children. The town's mayor offers Frey a place to stay, having noticed that she is a good influence on the children, but Frey ultimately chooses to remain in Kasel's group. Unhappy with Frey's decision, Elise tricks Frey into walking into a toolshed and locks her up within. As Kasel attempts to find her, he is attacked by demonic worms, until Frey breaks free from the shed and helps Kasel slay the demons. Elise apologizes to Frey and both girls promise to see each other again.
9	"Scars of the Dead"; Transliteration: "Shibito no Tsumeato" (Japanese: 死人の爪痕)	Tatsunari Koyano	Rie Koshika	November 28, 2020
Kasel and his friends arrive at a village devastated by the undead and take refuge in the house of Johann, Elise's father, and the sole survivor from the village. The group agrees to spend the night at Johann's house, believing they will have a better chance at surviving the undead during the day, but during the night, Kasel accidentally discovers Johann keeping his undead wife, Lisa, trapped in his basement. Johann reveals that he has been trying to help his wife regain her humanity so that they, and Elise, can be a family again, but comes to the realization that his wife is truly dead. As Kasel and his friends destroy the remaining undead, Johann reunites with Elise.
10	"Individual Motives"; Transliteration: "Sorezore no Riyū" (Japanese: それぞれの理由)	Sayaka Oda	Megumi Shimizu	December 5, 2020
Because of their actions in holding back the demon army, the Black Edge gains more popularity among the citizens of Orvelia. Scarlett reports the news to her father, the king, who is concerned about Moriham's connections to dark elves and advises Scarlett to be careful. Scarlett organizes a scouting part to investigate a place that Orvelia suspects the demon army will use to resurrect the Dark Lord and agrees to Riheet's request that the Black Edge be placed on the vanguard. The youngest member of the Black Edge, Tamm, develops feelings for Sheila, a human girl, an action that gets him harshly reprimanded by his teammates. Ripine asks Tamm what he wants to do with his life, to which he replies that he wants to be happy and Ripine replies that her happiness relies on helping her brother achieving his goals. She tells Tamm that if he wants to leave the Black Edge, she won't stop him, but if he does something that jeopardizes the Black Edge, she will kill him. Tamm agrees to stop seeing Sheila and focus solely on the mission. Meanwhile, Kasel and his friends arrive at the Red Valley, home of the orcs.
11	"Orcish Pride"; Transliteration: "Ōku no Hokori" (Japanese: オークの誇り)	Satoshi Takafuji	Megumu Sasano	December 12, 2020
Kasel and his friends traverse the Red Valley and come across the orc shaman Kaulah and his apprentice Dale under attack by orcish undead. After vanquishing the undead, Kaulah explains that he foresaw the arrival of Kasel through his dreams and Kasel explains that he needs the help of Chieftain Aeatola to undo the seal on the Holy Sword Eia. Unfortunately, Aetola died and his successor Sieg has been left in charge of the orc clan. Kaulah takes Kasel to the orc village, where Sieg reveals that Aeatola left instructions for the inheritor of the holy sword. If Kasel is truly the inheritor of the holy sword, he must prove his worthiness at the orcs' holy shrine and if he fails, Kasel and his friends will be put to death.
12	"The Time for Trial"; Transliteration: "Shiren no Toki" (Japanese: 試煉の刻)	Masashi Abe	Rie Koshika	December 19, 2020
As Kasel enters the holy shrine, he is trapped in a vision where his mother is alive and there are no demons plaguing the world. Despite his wish to spend more time with his mother, Kasel realizes he is trapped in an illusion and willingly chooses to return the real world. Acknowledging that Kasel has passed the test, Sieg undoes the second seal and agrees to fight at Kasel's side against the Dark Lord. Unfortunately, Malduk, having sensed the power of the holy sword, attacks the village and injures Sieg and Frey. Enraged at watching his allies get hurt, Kasel briefly unleashes holy power and forces Malduk to retreat before collapsing from exhaustion.
13	"To My Dear Friend"; Transliteration: "Shin'ai-naru Tomo e..." (Japanese: 親愛なる友へ…)	Makoto Hoshino, Satoshi Takafuji, Tatsunari Koyano, Masashi Abe, Shigeru Fukase, Sayaka Oda	Megumi Shimizu	December 26, 2020 (Note: Episodes 13 and 14 aired together as an hour long special.)
As Kasel recovers from his injuries, Frey writers a letter to Clause, describing all the things she has seen and the people she has met since leaving Orvelia.
14	"The Entrance to the Abyss"; Transliteration: "Fukaki Naraku no Iriguchi" (Japanese: 深き奈落の入口)	Yasuhiro Minami	Megumi Shimizu	December 26, 2020
Before the expedition on demon-infested territory begins, Princess Scarlet requests a training match with a member of the Black Edge to cultivate trust between them and the Guardian-Knights of Orvelia. Azal volunteers, thinking that this will be an easy victory but, he is defeated. Scarlett also decides to accompany the expedition, against the wishes of Behl, royal chancellor of Orvelia. Moriham, however, sees Scarlet's absence as an opportunity to usurp power from the royal family. As the expedition into demon territory begins, Scarlett attempts to befriend Ripine, who rejects her and claims that Scarlett wouldn't understand the hardships dark elves endured due to her life of wealth and privilege. The Black Edge explores the badlands, Tamm accidentally touches a symbol in the ground and gets turned into an undead. Suddenly, Malduk teleports right in front of the Black Edge.
15	"Battle in the Badlands"; Transliteration: "Arechi no Shitō" (Japanese: 荒地の死闘)	Satoshi Takafuji	Megumi Shimizu	January 9, 2021
Malduk, with assistance from Maria, slaughters the Black Edge but is forced to retreat when the Orvelia army closes in on him, leaving Riheet and Ripine as the only survivors. Meanwhile, Kasel awakens from a two-week coma after his fight with Malduk. Concerned about his own mental state, he decides to strengthen his mind and heart to properly wield the Holy Sword Eia. Kaulah also warns Frey that Kasel could die in his battle against the Dark Lord, causing Frey to worry about Kasel and do her best to attempt and change his fate.
16	"The Mercenary with Wings of Freedom"; Transliteration: "Jiyū no Tsubasa o Motsu Yōhei" (Japanese: 自由の翼を持つ傭兵)	Tatsunari Koyano	Megumu Sasano	January 16, 2021
On their way to Windland Snow Mountain, Kasel and his friends come across Reina, a mercenary helping a village of dark elves with a string of mysterious disappearances. Because of the dark elves' prejudice against Orvelians, Reina advises Kasel and his friends to hide their Orvelian origins and claim that they come from the Empire, like herself. She also tells Kasel about her former life as a noblewoman in the Empire, until she ran away from home and became a mercenary. Kasel and Reina discover that a giant spider demon has been kidnapping people from the village and Cleo is the latest victim. Working together, Kasel and Reine save the victims and kill the demon. With the villagers safe, Kasel and his friends continue their journey.
17	"Scars of Loss"; Transliteration: "Sōshitsu no Ato" (Japanese: 喪失の痕)	Masashi Abe	Megumi Shimizu	January 23, 2021
The Orvelian army sets up a temporary base camp at Elise's village while Scarlett oversees Riheet's recovery. Once he awakens, Scarlett informs him that the Black Edge was wiped out and he is the only survivor. Bitter, he attempts to find Malduk and avenge his friends, but Scarlett finds him before he can leave the forest, causing an angry Riheet to reveal that he never cared for Orvelia and only wanted to enslave its citizens as revenge for the discrimination dark elves endured, shocking Scarlet, who never knew that Orvelia was secretly oppressing dark elves. On his way to find way, Riheet comes across Maria, who tells him that Illya, the dark elf, that indirectly caused Orvelia to discriminate against dark elves, originally wanted to save Kyle and tells Riheet to go the Tower of the Sage and find the sword she had created.
18	"A Night of Reminiscing"; Transliteration: "Tsuioku no Yoru" (Japanese: 追憶の夜)	Sayaka Oda	Rie Koshika	January 30, 2021
As Kasel and his friend pass through some rocky plains, they are attacked by an undead that Roi recognizes as his former teammate before killing it. At night, while Frey and Cleo are sleeping, Roi explains to Kasel that he used to work for a mercenary ground led by a captain named Zayed, until Orvelia asked them to investigate demonic activity at Gallua Plains. Once there, Roi's entire group was turned into undead by magical traps left by Malduk and Roi only survived because Dominicus rescued him and allowed him to stay at the Tower of the Sage. The next day, Roi and Kasel kill the remaining undead and Roi pays his respects to his fallen captain before continuing his journey.
19	"Hidden Determination"; Transliteration: "Hisoka na Ketsui" (Japanese: 密かな決意)	Satoshi Takafuji	Megumu Sasano	February 6, 2021
Kasel and his friends arrive at Windland Snow Mountain but are forced to walk through a strong wind current until they arrive at a log cabin. There, Frey collapses from exhaustion and the group decides to spend the night at the cabin until the wind dies down. Kasel, refusing to put his friends in any more danger, attempts to walk the rest of the journey by himself until Roi and Cleo stop him and reveal that Frey protected them from the cold of the mountain using her magic. Realizing that his friends have been protecting him the same way he has protected them, Kasel apologizes for his brash thinking. The group enters the cave of Pavel, the sorcerer who holds the last seal on the Holy Sword Eia but Kasel is separated from his friends by a thick wall of ice. Meanwhile, Scarlet's army prepares to return to Orvelia until Riheet asks for directions on how to arrive to the Tower of the Sage because he wants to discover the truth about Illya and her false sword. Scarlett agrees to go with him.
20	"The Solitary Sorcerer"; Transliteration: "Kokō no Mahōshi" (Japanese: 孤高の魔法師)	Kazuomi Koga	Rie Koshika	February 13, 2021
Within the cave, Kasel encounters Pavel, the ice sorcerer who once became an ally to King Kyle. Frey, Roi, and Cleo break through the ice wall created by Pavel and meet up with Kasel. Pavel reveals that he had put Kasel's friends through a test because he wanted to see how much they were willing to do to help Kasel and now, he is willing to explain his history with King Kyle. Long ago, Kyle came to Pavel's cave to request his aid against the Dark Lord and Pavel reluctantly agreed. After Kyle disappeared in his battle with the Dark Lord, Pavel and Dominicus, against the protests of Lorraine, enacted a secret plan to protect Arlette, Kyle's wife, and her unborn child. Using his ice magic, Pavel placed Arlette and the unborn Kasel in suspended animation and awakened them a hundred years later. Although Pavel regrets not finding a better way to ensure the survival of Kyle's bloodline, Kasel does not regret the life he has lived and declares he will continue Kyle's work. With the night of the Dark Lord's return fast approaching, Pavel brings Kasel's group to the World Tree, the holiest place in the planet, so they can awaken the Holy Sword Eia. Meanwhile, Malduk and Maria begin their ritual to summon the Dark Lord back into the realm of the living, only to find that their spell has summoned Kyle instead.
21	"Illya's Truth"; Transliteration: "Shinjitsu no Iria" (Japanese: 真実のイリア)	Sun Hi Son	Megumi Shimizu	February 20, 2021
Maria initially believes that Kyle was summoned from the dimensional rift Angmund was trapped it, only for Kyle to reveal himself to Angmund in disguise. Meanwhile, Scarlet and Riheet reach the Tower of the Sage. While Riheet investigates Illya's laboratory, Dominicus reveals to Scarlett that Kasel and his friends are searching for the Holy Sword Eia and that Kasel is the biological son of King Kyle, hidden from the rest of the world to ensure the survival of Kyle's bloodline should Kyle himself fall in battle. Riheet searches for the fake Holy Sword created by Illya, only to discover that no such sword exists. Illya was, in fact, working on special equipment that would protect its intended wearer, Kyle, from the Dark Lord's magic. When Illya died, however, the nobility of Orvelia branded her a heretic and made up the story of Illya creating a sword as an insult to the goddess Lua to remove Kyle's bloodline and seize power for themselves. Dominicus confirms the story and admits he tried to reveal the truth, but nobody was convinced. Even the dark elves, who were exiled because of the false accusations thrown at Illya, became convinced that she was guilty. Riheet also discovers that he himself is a descendant of Illya and that his pendant is the finished version of the protective equipment Illya had been working on her whole life. Realizing he has nothing left to lose, Riheet agrees to help Scarlet find Kasel.
22	"To The World Tree"; Transliteration: "Seikaiju o Mezashite" (Japanese: 世界樹を目指して)	Tatsunari Koyano	Megumu Sasano	February 27, 2021
Pavel guides Kasel and his friends back to the forest of Elladora as part of the path towards the World Tree. Unfortunately, they are attacked by Malduk, Maria and the resurrected Angmund. Kasel and his friends fall into the river surrounding the forest, but they are unexpectedly rescued by Maria, who asks Kasel to look after Pavel. Lorraine and Selene find the injured Pavel and attempt to nurse back to health using the life force of the forest, while Kasel informs them that Angmund has been resurrected. Maria attempts to speak to Kasel about Kyle, but Lorraine informs Kasel and his friends that Maria used to be a saintist devoted to the worship of Lua, until some undisclosed event caused her to worship Leia, the goddess of darkness, instead.
23	"Maria's Rain of Tears"; Transliteration: "Maria no Namidaame" (Japanese: マリアの涙雨)	Masashi Abe	Megumu Sasano	March 6, 2021
Maria tells Kasel and his friends about her old life as a saintist and a friend of Kyle. She knew him back when he was a prince and was there when she met Arlette, Kasel's mother. She was initially a devoted servant of the goddess Lua and supported the efforts of Illya to create magical equipment that would protect Kyle from the Dark Lord's power. Unfortunately, during the Battle of Gallua Plains, Kyle was corrupted by the Dark Lord's power and trapped in the same dimensional rift the Dark Lord was, while Illya was killed by demons while trying to help Kyle. Believing that the goddess Lua had abandoned her friends in their time of greatest need, Maria renounced her loyalty to Lua and became devoted to Leia, the goddess of darkness. Maria departs from the forest of Elladora, but not before revealing that Kyle has become a vessel for the Dark Lord's soul, which means that Kasel might have to kill his own father to save the world. However, Kasel believes he can save his father from darkness. Pavel recovers from his injuries but admits that, in his current state, he won't be able to reach the World Tree, forcing him to undo the final seal on the Holy Sword. The group, with Selene joining them, departs to the World Tree.
24	"Those Who Stand Firm"; Transliteration: "Tachimukau Mono-tachi" (Japanese: 立ち向かう者たち)	Sayaka Oda, Yasuhiro Minami, Satoshi Takafuji, Tatsunari Koyano, Masashi Abe, Kazuomi Koga	Megumi Shimizu	March 13, 2021
As Scarlet prepares to travel to the World Tree, she writes a letter to chancellor Behl about what happened during the expedition to Gallua Plains. Meanwhile, Kasel's group moves towards the World Tree and informs Selene about what happened to them after leaving the forest of Elladora.
25	"Blade of Vengeance, Blooms in Darkness"; Transliteration: "Yami Saku, Fukushū no Yaiba" (Japanese: 闇咲く、復讐の刃)	Satoshi Takafuji	Megumi Shimizu	March 20, 2021
Riheet and Scarlet reach the World Tree and find Eia, which is claimed by Riheet to avenge his friends. Malduk attempts to take Eia from Riheet, but Scarlet distract Malduk long enough for Riheet to decapitate him. Unfortunately, Angmund takes Eia from Riheet, just as Kasel and his friends arrive at the World Tree.
26	"The Battle of the World Tree"; Transliteration: "Sekaiju no Tatakai" (Japanese: 世界樹の戦い)	Makoto Hoshino	Megumi Shimizu	March 27, 2021
The final battle begins as Kasel and his friends separate Angmund from Eia. Unfortunately, Eia was actually restraining Angmund's power and without the holy sword, Angmund can fully unleash his power on the heroes. Kasel barely grabs Eia, just in time for Riheet to give him the pendant created by Illya. The pendant creates an armor that protects Kasel from Angmund's dark power and with the full power of Eia, Kasel frees Kyle from Angmund's armor and allows his soul to depart to the afterlife. With the battle over, demonic activity has decreased significantly. Scarlet offers Riheet a noble title as an attempt to promote peaceful relations between Orvelia and the dark elves, but Riheet requests some time before he can make his decision. He first needs to educate his fellow dark elves about Illya's actions, hoping that, in time, this will improve relations between Orvelia and the dark elves. Before leaving Orvelia, however, he gives the pendant to Kasel. As Riheet reunites with Ripine, who barely survived Malduk's attack, Kasel and Frey reunite with Cleo and Roi, ready to begin another adventure together.
