= King's Raid =

2016 mobile game

- Developer: Vespa
- Publishers: Vespa; GloHow (formerly)
- Engine: Unity 3D
- Platforms: Android, iOS
- Release: TH: September 19, 2016; WW: February 16, 2017; JP: March 23, 2018
- Genre: Role-playing
- Mode: Single-player

King's Raid (킹스레이드) was a free-to-play side-scrolling RPG mobile game, which is developed by South Korean indie game developer Vespa and initially published by Thailand-based company GloHow, before Vespa took over the rights in June 2017. It was first released on September 19, 2016, for operating systems Android and iOS in Thailand. The global version consists of 3 servers was later released on February 16, 2017, and supports Korean and English language.

== Story ==
The game set in the continent called Orbis, a land of swords and magic. In the first season, players follow a story of knight-in-training named Kasel, who seeks to uncover the mystery behind his brother's disappearance. Along the way, he meets his priest childhood friend Frey, magician Cleo and her bodyguard Roi, and also encounters many other playable heroes.

A major turning point of the story gets introduced in Chapter 9, which ends in a cliffhanger.

Chapter 10 has two parts; In the first part, the chapter picks up what happened after the events of Chapter 9's ending, which slowly turns into another turning point, the second half of the chapter, labeled as Chapter X: The Final, which leads to the epic showdown between a new ally and a lurking threat that slowly emerged from the shadows. After the threat has been dealt with, the two leading characters set on a new journey that brings peace to them after the perilous events in Orvel.

In the second season of the story line, the players explore the events that happen in the Vespian Empire that got introduced in Season 1, along with the prologue stories that are part of the new King's Raid: Reload update.

== Gameplay ==
The game is described as "character collection SRPG" that allows players to create their party with characters of their own choice without the gacha system, real time PVP arena, and various type of raid battles. It features real-time battles with 3D graphics. As of September 22, 2017, the game also supports other languages such as French, German, Portuguese, Russian, Spanish, Thai, and Vietnamese. The game also supports voice dubs in English and Korean. The Japanese server, voice, and language was added to the game on March 23, 2018.

There are several playable characters called "heroes" that players can acquire through in-app purchase, hero tickets, gifting NPC heroes, or building a friendship at the inn. These heroes are divided into 7 classes (knights, warriors, assassins, archers, mechanics, wizards, and priests), 2 types of attacks (physical and magical), and initial grades that can be increased through awakening. Players can assemble a party made of 4 heroes who are able to cover the front line, middle line, and/or the back line. In some modes like world boss raid, player can make an 8-character party (though, 4 of these are automatically controlled).

== Development and release ==
King's Raid was developed by Vespa. It was released on 16 February 2017. The game's cumulative number of download exceeded 13 millions across 150 countries as of May 2020.

A Windows client of the game has been announced in April 2021, and a remaster / revamp of the game's aesthetics and UI has been announced in Q1 2021, which eventually got the working title King's Raid 2, and further named as King's Raid: The Reload, with a mini-site showing the all-new improved graphics giving back a similar look what could be seen in the cinematics of Season 1.

The deployment of the visual update was slated to be released by the end of 2021, but got postponed to Q2 2022, in order to make a flawless experience in all contents. CEO Kim Jin-soo has said in a 2023 statement that the update will eventually get released. On March 9, 2023, it has been announced that Vespa will enter the open mergers and acquisitions market, to be sold to an external investor. In November 2023, the developer laid off all 105 employees.

Vespa faced financial problems during the 2020s due to commercial failure of its other video games. In July 2022, the company entered a major reorganization and laid off all of the development staff. King's Raid was closed down on 15 March 2025. On February 14, 2025, it is announced that the game's service would be terminated on March 15, 2025, and the game would become unobtainable from app markets from the same day as the announcement.

On 17 March 2025, Masangsoft announced it had purchased the intellectual property of King's Raid. On April 22, 2025, Masangsoft purchased the IP of King's Raid, with the intention to relaunch.

== Other media ==
On September 18, 2019, the South Korean girl band Dreamcatcher released the EP Raid of Dream, which was based on the game's story and themes. It includes the song "Deja Vu", which serves as the release's main song. In March and April 2019, the Japanese server of King's Raid released two sets of character songs featuring Kara-Annette pair and Mitra-Crow pair.

On April 9, 2020, an anime television series adaptation was announced, and aired from October 3, 2020, to March 27, 2021, on TV Tokyo. The series is animated by OLM and Sunrise Beyond, with Makato Hoshino serving as director, Megumi Shimizu serving as series composer, and Tatsuya Arai designing the characters. Masahiro Tokuda is composing the series' music.

On June 8, 2021, Vespa released a soundtrack album named King's Raid: The Story of Orvel, featuring in-game and promotional soundtracks, after the final chapter update for Season 1 has been released. The album features Dreamcatcher and Shin Youngsook, and is composed by XKA and Nauts.
