= Gundam Build Divers Re:Rise =

Japanese anime series

- Cover of the second Compact Blu-ray volume

ガンダムビルドダイバーズRe:RISE (Gandamu Birudo Daibāzu Re:Raizu)
- Genre: Mecha science fiction adventure
- Created by: Hajime Yatate; Yoshiyuki Tomino
- Original net animation
- Directed by: Shinya Watada
- Written by: Yasuyuki Muto
- Music by: Hidemura Kimura
- Studio: Sunrise Beyond
- Licensed by: NA: Sunrise
- Released: October 10, 2019 – August 27, 2020
- Episodes: 26
- Manga

Gundam Build Diver Rize
- Written by: Ryōji Sekinishi
- Illustrated by: Shiitake Gensui; Harakazu Hiro; Takayuki Yanase
- Published by: Kadokawa Shoten
- Magazine: Gundam Ace
- Original run: November 2019 – March 2021
- Volumes: 3
- Original net animation

Gundam Build Divers: Battlogue
- Directed by: Masami Ōbari
- Written by: Yasuyuki Muto
- Music by: Hidemura Kimura
- Studio: Sunrise Beyond
- Licensed by: NA: Sunrise
- Released: November 13, 2020

Gundam Build Divers Re:Rise (Japanese: ガンダムビルドダイバーズRe:RISE, Hepburn: Gandamu Birudo Daibāzu Re:Raizu) is a Japanese original net animation anime series produced by Sunrise Beyond, and the fourth series within the Gundam Build Series sub-series. A sequel to the 2018 anime Gundam Build Divers, it is the first Gundam anime series to be released in the Reiwa period, released to celebrate the franchise's 40th anniversary. The series is directed by Shinya Watada and written by Yasuyuki Muto. Initially announced at the Gundam 40th anniversary video, the series aired on its Gundam Channel YouTube channel from October 10 to December 26, 2019. A TV airing of the ONA began on BS11 on October 12, 2019, and on January 28, 2020, on Tokyo MX. A second season aired from April 9 to August 27, 2020. Two spinoffs of the series were later serialized in Kadokawa's Gundam Ace magazine and Hobby Japan.

== Plot ==
Two years have passed since the EL-Diver Incident, an event that almost destroyed the Gunpla Battle Nexus Online (GBN) game until it was resolved by the force group known as "Build Divers", and soon after more EL-Divers were discovered. In order to make the game more secure, a newer version of the game was rolled out in order to prevent the same incident from happening again and with newer experiences that would make the gameplay more immersive to players.

The story focuses on Hiroto Kuga, a high schooler who is currently a rogue Diver in GBN, who goes in the game and wanders throughout its countless dimensions while helping out other Divers whether it is on insistence whim or by hire. His primary goal as a Diver is to be reunited with a mysterious girl from his past named Eve, who was in fact the very first EL-Diver to appear in the game. But after a special request mission, Hiroto is united with three other active Divers in a strange world named "Eldora" and forms the Force group "BUILD DiVERS" in what appears to be just another GBN gamespace event, until they learn the truth about Eldora and its consequences not only for GBN, but for the entire world.

== Characters ==
=== BUILD DiVERS ===
Hiroto Kuga (クガ・ヒロト, Kuga Hiroto) / Hiroto (ヒロト, Hiroto)
Voiced by: Chiaki Kobayashi (Japanese); Billy Kametz (English)
The main protagonist of the series and a high-school builder, veteran diver, and a former ace member of the Force group Avalon, who lives in Yokohama. He was one of the first minors to make it to the deep end of GBN, due to his conviction of being a person who does his best to help others. He was active prior and during the events of the previous series. Now working as a rogue diver for hire after leaving Avalon, he wanders the GBN gamespace alone, harboring regrets, resentments, and suffering from trauma after the death of his close friend and lover, the EL-Diver Eve. He is very calm and a man of few words, usually refusing others' reward and help, especially on joining other forces, but this stoic persona is a mental mask to hide his condition from everyone, including his parents. But when a special mission done by Freddie united him with Kazami, May and Parviz, they accidentally formed the force team named "BUILD DiVERS" to protect the Eldorans from the One-Eyes army. Currently he is the ace of his unit and the leader of the overall force.
Hiroto uses the PFF-X7 Core Gundam as his main Gunpla, based on the RX-78-2 Gundam from the original Mobile Suit Gundam series. Its special armament system called the "core-change" gimmick and his first theme invented from that gimmick is the "Planets System". This allows the Core Gundam to be equipped with various types of armor and weapons, each for a different situation named after the eight planets. Hiroto later upgrades his Gunpla into the PFF-X7II Core Gundam II. This new Core Gundam can transform into the "Core Flyer", in a similar fashion to the original Gundam's FF-X7 Core Fighter for increased mobility and like its predecessor, it can also use the Planets System:

- Earth Armor (PFF-X7/E3 Earthree Gundam): Core Gundam's default blue armor, focused on traditional all-around combat.
- Mars Armor (PFF-X7/M4 Marsfour Gundam): A red armor whose focus is on fragments of four styles of close combat, hence "Cross-Combat".
- Venus Armor (PFF-X7/V2 Veetwo Gundam): A green armor whose focus is commando style ranged and bombardment combat, additionally with option works.
- Mercury Armor (PFF-X7/M1 Mercuone Gundam): A navy armor whose focus is underwater combat.
- Jupiter Armor (PFF-X7/J5 Jupitive Gundam): A white armor whose focus is fast orbital combat.
- Uranus Armor (PFF-X7II/U7 Uraven Gundam): An indigo armor focused on reconnaissance and high powered sniping.
- Saturn Armor (PFF-X7II/S6 Saturnix Gundam): An orange armor focused in demolition style close combat without beam weapons, originally developed to counter Gundam Frames.
- Neptune Armor (PFF-X7II/N8 Nepteight Gundam): An aqua-green armor equipped with a customized Volture Lumiere system similar to the one from Mobile Suit Gundam SEED C.E. 73: Stargazer, intended to be used for traveling through GBN's space in a short amount of time, but was used for launching into orbit instead of maneuvering in deep space. It is ultimately discarded in Eldora's orbit due to the strain of leaving Eldora's gravitational field.
- Pluto Armor (PFF-X7II+/P9 Plutine Gundam): Appearing only on Gundam Build Metaverse, the black colored armor is used for close combat and dueling purposes with its color scheme reminiscent of that of EcoPla.
- PFF-X7II/BUILD DiVERS Re:Rising Gundam: A special combination of the Core Gundam II with the WoDom Pod + and parts from the Gundam Aegis Knight and the EX Valkylander, armed with two giant beam sabers, eight miracle wings born from Eve's blessings, and the "Grand Cross Cannon", Hiroto's first special move, made with the help of his team.

In one occasion, Hiroto changes his avatar to a Haro to pilot the Mobile Builder Haro Loader to help with the repairs on Cuadorn by making a prosthetic wing out of gunpla parts. During the Gunpla Battle Royal, he pilots an unmodified ASW-G-08 Gundam Barbatos Lupus Rex from Mobile Suit Gundam: Iron-Blooded Orphans.
In Battlelogue, it is revealed that he has made a second Core Gundam II that he leaves on Eldora with the colors of the Gundam MK-II Titan. Another variant of this Gunpla sports the old "Gundam G3" colors with his team's personal crest, which is most likely to represent Sarah since the color of her hair, eyes, and dress embody Hiroto's time with Eve before they joined Avalon and to symbolize how he has officially befriended the original Build Divers. Each of the two units have unique advancements, the Titan color specializes in ground and underwater combat and the G3 color specializes in aerial and space combat.
May (メイ, Mei)
Voiced by: Mai Fuchigami (Japanese); Lauren Landa (English)
A seemingly late teens female diver who prefers to play solo, she is a very calm and no-nonsense girl whose interest is in battles alone. However, she is not a fan of those who engage their opponents head on and prefers to implement a strategic approach. She is mature and has a strong sense of justice, and can be impulsive rushing into situations, especially for those in danger. Later in the series, she is revealed to be one of the 87 EL-Divers, however she was not one of those who were saved after the EL-Diver incident two years ago, she was born shortly after. After she was born she was given her own Mobile Doll body similar to Sarah, that is when she first met her, Koichi, Tsukasa, and Nanami. During the Lotus Challenge Eldoran style rehearsal battle it is revealed that she, as a new sister of Sarah, addresses the latter as the older since Sarah is chronologically older, regardless of her maturity. In the final episode, she is revealed to have been born with the remnant data originating from Eve, the first born EL-Diver who Hiroto befriended and fell in love with several years ago, and carries Eve's earring on her armband. In Battlelogue, it's implied that she is currently living with Hiroto IRL and in GBN is his attendant.
May uses the JMA0530-MAY WoDom Pod as her main Gunpla, which is a customized JMA-0530 Walking Dome from Turn A Gundam. In the later episodes, the mobile suit is revealed to be a disguise for its true form, the HER-SELF Mobile Doll May. May later upgrades her WoDom Pod into the JMA0530-MAYBD WoDom Pod +. During the Gunpla Battle Royal, she uses her Mobile Doll (albeit with a new color scheme and the Gundam Base logo) along with an unmodified NZ-999 II Neo Zeong mobile armor from Mobile Suit Gundam Narrative.
Kazami Torimachi (トリマチ・カザミ, Torimachi Kazami) / Kazami (カザミ, Kazami)
Voiced by: Masaaki Mizunaka (Japanese); Ray Chase (English)
A diver who was a former member of the diver group "Mu Dish". He is a very energetic diver who fancies himself as a hero and seeks to make a name for himself in GBN. Though he enjoys the game, he also has been a long fan of the G-TUBER Captain Zeon on his success in several battles, but this obsession drove his former teammates to losing and soon left the group. It was at that time he met Hiroto and the others to form the new BUILD DiVERS group to prove his sense of justice, and be the leader of their team, although he doesn't mind Hiroto being the team's ace and hero. In real life, Kazami is a teenager with a scrawny body and the son of a fisherman. Currently he is the leader of the latter unit, the left hand sub-leader of the overall force and the poster guy for their G-tube channel.
Kazami uses ZGMF-X19AK Gundam Justice Knight as his main Gunpla, which is a ZGMF-X19A Infinite Justice from Mobile Suit Gundam SEED Destiny customized with knight motif and limited armament. He also possesses a modified Petit'gguy called the Justi'gguy. Kazami later uses the GAT-X303K Gundam Aegis Knight as his main Gunpla, inspired from the GAT-X303 Aegis Gundam from Mobile Suit Gundam SEED, which is also customized with knight motif and limited armament, especially its larger shield that can combine with its other weapons to form the bigger "Keraunos Hyper Beam Sword", when it assumes "King Mode" and a transformable Assault Mode similar to the original Aegis. During the Gunpla Battle Royal, he pilots an unmodified ZGMF-X42S Destiny Gundam also from SEED Destiny.
Patrick Alexandre Leonard Arge (パトリック・アレクサンドル・レオナルド・アルジェ, Patorikku Arekusandoru Reonarudo Aruje) / Parviz (パルヴィーズ, Paruvīzu)
Voiced by: Mayu Minami (Japanese); Laura Stahl (English)
A novice diver and builder whose avatar has fox-like features, inspired from being the younger brother of Shahryar, one of the characters of the previous series. He usually takes on playing the game after taking advice from his older brother, but due to his shy and often timid personality, thus had problems making friends. In real life, Patrick is a teenage foreigner from a wealthy Middle Eastern family, just like his brother. He was left paralyzed after his glider crashed in the middle of a storm; said incident caused him to have a fear of heights, even though he doesn't want to be and eventually breaks through it.
Parviz uses the Valkylander, which he nicknamed "Morgiana", as his main Gunpla, a customized Super Deformed GNY-001F Gundam Astraea Type-F with elements from the Gundlander series in which first appears as a dragon and can transform into its SD Mobile Suit form when in battle. On some occasions, it carries the "Avalanche Rex Buster", a cannon which can also combine with the Gunpla itself. It also has its own version of the Trans-Am system from the 00 series called "Gundrans-Am" that temporarily increases its performance. Parviz later makes another version his Gunpla called the EX Valkylander, based on the GNY-001 Gundam Astraea and its design elements based on the Sacred Beast Cuadorn, including bigger wings for itself and the Re:Rising Gundam where they grow into miracle wings. In one occasion, Parviz changes his avatar to a Haro to pilot the Mobile Builder Haro Fitter to help with the repairs on Cuadorn. During the Gunpla Battle Royal, he pilots an unmodified version of the XXXG-00W0 Wing Gundam Zero from Gundam Wing: Endless Waltz.
Hinata Mukai (ムカイ・ヒナタ, Mukai Hinata)
Voiced by: Shion Wakayama (Japanese); Lisa Reimold (English)
Hiroto's classmate who practices archery and childhood friend who lives next door and works at the same Gundam Base where he logs into GBN. She cares deeply about him, even knowing his heart belongs to another. She witnessed him coming home in the rain and crying on the day that Eve was sacrificed and becomes more worried upon learning that he is risking his life in a real war. In the final episode, she joins GBN as a new member of Hiroto's team and meets Freddie along with the New Eldorans. Her diver avatar is a shrine priestess in a dress miko.
The only known gunpla she has is a pink Petit'gguy that she built with Hiroto's supervision from back when they were in elementary school.

=== People of Eldora ===
Freddie (フレディ, Furedi)
Voiced by: Ai Kakuma (Japanese); Lizzie Freeman (English)
A preteen anthropomorphic dog boy who lived on Planet Eldora, considered to be one of the "New People" after the departure of the Ancients eons ago. He is very cheerful and shows a lot of respect to the BUILD DiVERS, often calling them Creators. He is also the one who can summon them through the temples left behind by the Ancients. He saw many of the Build Divers' accomplishments on the GBN live stream via the ruins and would go to the ruins everyday just to watch them. He originally planned to use the ruins to summon the original Build Divers, but ended up making a new team of Build Divers instead, and initially thought they were part of them, with two of the members, Hiroto and May, having a connection to Sarah and one, Parviz, having an indirect connection to her. Like Sarah, he usually rides in a Gunpla as a passenger, mostly with Hiroto. He initially served as the BUILD DiVERS' motivator, but is now the Eldoran representative member of the team and later on the entire Build Diver force. It is revealed that his ancient ancestral genes came from a dog that belonged to one of Alus's creators whose face Eve merited.
After Alus's defeat Hiroto eventually leaves a copy of the Saturn armor on Eldora for the latter to test-fly on.
Maiya (マイヤ, Maiya)
Voiced by: Yuna Mimura (Japanese); Brittany Cox (English)
A late teen anthropomorphic cat girl who lives on Eldora. She is the older sister of Freddie, who is very wary about the BUILD DiVERS's appearance in their village. She usually has a strong sense of justice but doesn't get along with Kazami at times, regardless the latter having a crush on her.
Stola (ストラ, Sutora)
Voiced by: Kotomi Aihara (Japanese); Aleks Le (English)
Maiya and Freddie's childhood friend. Stola wants to join the Eldora Resistance against the One-Eyes. After Alus fired the satellite cannon on the city of Seguri, he became one of the sole survivors of the event.
Asha (アシャ), Towana (トワナ) and Hulun (フルン, Furun)
Voiced by: Yūki Takada (Asha), Asuna Tomari (Towana), Michiyo Murase (Hulun) (Japanese); Michelle Marie (Asha), Julie Ann Taylor (Towana), Dorah Fine (Hulun) (English)
Three Eldoran children in the mountain village, who are close friends with Freddie and Stola. They become very close with Parviz.
Tonoi (トノイ)
Voiced by: Kan Tanaka (Japanese); Kevin M. Connolly (English)
Freddie, Maya, and Jed's father and the village chief of their mountain village on Eldora.
Jiric (ジリク, Jiriku)
Voiced by: Kōichi Sōma (Japanese); Jason Marnocha (English)
Hulun's Grandfather. An old Badger person who lives on crop farming in Freddie's village, raising his crops with care. Despite his grumpy personality and looks, he is a very influential person, among the people of the mountain.
Jed (ジェド, Jeddo)
Voiced by: Junichi Yanagita (Japanese); Xander Mobus (English)
Freddie and Maiya's elder brother, and leader of a platoon in the Eldora Resistance. Freddie idolizes him and aspires to be like him when he is an adult and his favorite person in his life. He dies alongside the residents of Seguri when Alus fires his orbital cannon to obliterate the city.
Gorus (ゴルス, Gorusu)
Voiced by: Taro Yamaguchi (Japanese); Brook Chalmers (English)
The leader of the Eldora Resistance's ground forces, and later on the temporary leader of the New People as they rebuild from the damage caused by the satellite cannon.
Calico (カリコ, Kariko) and Zabun (ザブン)
Voiced by: Kōji Okino (Calico), Shunichi Maki (Zabun) (Japanese); Joe Zieja (Calico), Tony Oliver (Zabun) (English)
Two members of the Eldora Resistance, who survived the Satellite Cannon firing on Seguri alongside Stola. During the final episode, they come across a surviving Guard Eye unit and take it under their care.
Muran (ムラン)
Voiced by: Shinji Kawada (Japanese); Jordan Reynolds (English)
A cat-like person, who is part of the Eldora Resistance. He has once known Masaki Shido when he first appeared in Eldora before Alus brainwashed him and turned him against his group. With him the surviving member of his division, he had developed a dislike towards the BUILD DiVERS, but slowly trusts them sooner and later. After Jed's death, he leads a new platoon for the Resistance to assist the BUILD DiVERS.
Cuadorn (クアドルン, Kuadorun)
Voiced by: Takaya Hashi (Japanese); Bob Carter (English)
A giant biomechanical dragon that existed in the Legends of Eldora for centuries. Once created by the Ancients, he helped them with protecting Eldora from outside threats eons ago until they decided to depart from space to search for new planets to colonize. He soon fell into a deep sleep, watching over the "New People" that flourished the planet after the Ancients' departure. After Masaki stumbled into Eldora, he assisted him with fighting against the One-Eyes until it was injured. Since then, it took refuge in Milagg Mountain until it was awakened once more by Freddie and Parviz to help Hiroto and May repel back Alus's attack against them. Reluctant to accept the BUILD DiVERS' help at first, Cuadorn agrees to ally with them after realizing their will to protect their friends in Eldora. Cuadorn's wing is later restored with some spare Gunpla parts provided by Parviz, with the beast later joining the BUILD DiVERS on their mission to rescue Masaki. He and Masaki later assist the BUILD DiVERS in destroying Alus' satellite cannon and, upon its destruction, destroy its mainframe to prevent Alus from retreating back to Eldora. After the final battle, Cuadorn is seen with some New Eldorans on Milagg Mountain which was relocated in the crater where Seguri City once stood.
His new wing was built primarily using loose gunpla parts from the XXXG-00W0 Wing Gundam Zero from Gundam Wing: Endless Waltz and RX-104 Penelope from Mobile Suit Gundam: Hathaway's Flash.

=== One-Eyes ===
Masaki Shido (シドー・マサキ, Shidō Masaki) / Masked Man (仮面の男, Kamen no Otoko) / Sid (シド, Shido)
Voiced by: Sōma Saitō (Japanese); Griffin Burns (English)
A veteran S-Ranked Diver who May has been searching for since his disappearance. In real life, Masaki is bed-ridden at the city's general hospital after falling into a coma while logged in to GBN half a year prior to the events of the series. Later, it is revealed that he is brainwashed by the One-Eyes, becoming a masked man who served Alus and sided with them to terrorize Eldora. May recognized him as such despite his appearance in Eldora. However, his extended time in Eldora plus the brainwashing from the One-Eyes caused a serious deterioration on his real life self and his health condition. But due to the BUILD DiVERS' efforts, Masaki is freed from Alus' control and returns to his body back in the real world. With his sister's consent, Masaki returns to Eldora and teams up with Cuadorn again to assist the BUILD DiVERS in the final battle against Alus. He and Cuadorn later destroy the satellite cannon's mainframe to prevent Alus from returning to Eldora.
Masaki uses the MSF-007TE Gundam Tertium as his main Gunpla, a heavily customized MSF-007 Gundam Mark-III from Z-MSV. After being brainwashed by Alus, his Gunpla is converted into the MSF-007SS Gundam Seltsam equipped with the massive Seltsam Arm, which gives the Gunpla a demonic look while displaying massive strength. After Masaki is finally released from Alus's control, his Gunpla is converted into the Gundam Advanced Tertium, now equipped with the Tertium Arms for space combat.
Alus (アルス, Arusu)
Voiced by: Akira Ishida (Japanese); Austin Lee Matthews (English)
The series's main antagonist, an Artificial Intelligence entity residing in Eldora's moon which was created by the Ancients to protect the planet from outside threats. After the Ancients left the ravaged planet after a long war, Alus entered into a long slumber. Once he reawakened, he mistook the current inhabitants of Eldora for invaders and started attacking them, using his vast knowledge and resources. After having his orbital cannon and mobile units destroyed by the BUILD DiVERS, he angrily decided to invade GBN as a last resort to destroy them, the game and all Divers in it. In the end, he and his entire fleet, alongside his mobile suits, were defeated and sank down by the BUILD DiVERS, the Third Coalition of Volunteers and many other Divers in GBN, with Alus being deleted by both Hiroto and Riku, during which, he passes on after seeing a vision of two Ancient Eldorans resembling Eve and Sarah. After the final battle, his feelings and some of his data are reincarnated as an infant EL-Diver carrying a pendant resembling a Guard Eye, making him the 88th EL-Diver.
Due to Alus's vast access to GBN through Masaki, he was able to create and build mechanical puppets based on Gunpla seen in GBN Online. In the second season, Alus develops the AGP-X1 Alus Core Gundam, a more powerful replica of Hiroto Kuga's Core Gundam with more upgraded specifications and weaponry to fight the BUILD DiVERS. It utilizes a similar core-change gimmick like the original Core Gundam, allowing it to be equipped with several armors made by Alus himself.

- AGP-X1/E3 Alus Earthree Gundam: An armor based on the Core Gundam's Earth Armor with the Uraven Gundam's Rifle. A variant of this is created when Alus steals the original Earth Armor from Hiroto during the final battle against him.
- AGP-X1/NU Fake ν Gundam: An armor based on the RX-93 ν Gundam from Mobile Suit Gundam: Char's Counterattack.
- Dubious Arche Gundam: An armor based on the GNW-20000 Arche Gundam from Mobile Suit Gundam 00.
- Reverse Turn X: An armor based on the CONCEPT-X 6-1-2 Turn X from Turn A Gundam.

The Nu, Arche and Turn X units were first defeated by the BUILD DiVERS in their second attempt to destroy Alus's orbital cannon. Said units, along with Alus's Earthree and Core Gundams, were all permanently destroyed by the same team assisted by a few other Divers in GBN during Alus's attempted invasion on the game.
Guard Eyes (ガードアイ, Gādo Ai)
The Guard Eyes are unmanned machines that pilot the larger, One-Eyes mecha. Guard Eyes are usually sent alone as scouts prior to their attacks on Eldoran settlements. In the final episode, one of them remains under the care of Calico and Zabun after Alus's downfall. In Battlelogue, said unit is revealed to be friendly with the people of Freddie's village who accepted it and is able to express emotions through the trembling of its iris and body language.

=== Third Coalition of Volunteers ===
Magee (マギー, Magī)
Voiced by: Taishi Murata (Japanese); Doug Erholtz (English)
A flamboyant veteran diver, affectionately referred to as "sis" or "mama" and leader of the Force group "Adam's Apple". He serves as both a bartender (both in-game and in real life) and May's caretaker, until he gives her to Hiroto, at her own choice.
Similar to the previous series, he uses the ZGMF-X20A-LP Gundam Love Phantom. During the Gunpla Battle Royal, he pilots an unmodified ASW-G-01 Gundam Bael from Mobile Suit Gundam: Iron-Blooded Orphans.
Ruck Arge (リュック・アルジェ, Ryukku Aruje) / Shahryar (シャフリヤール, Shafuriyāru)
Voiced by: Ryōta Ōsaka (Japanese); Todd Haberkorn (English)
Parviz's older brother, he is leader of the Force group "Simurgh" (シームルグ, Shīmurugu) and a veteran Diver, who is among the top two Gunpla builders in GBN. He was the one who convinced Parviz to join GBN after his little brother's accident.
His main Gunpla is the GN-1001N Seravee Gundam Scheherazade.
Nanami Nanase (ナナセ・ナナミ, Nanase Nanami) / Nami (ナミ)
Voiced by: Kanae Itō (Japanese); Reba Buhr (English)
A staff member of The Gundam Base Tokyo and younger sister of Koichi Nanase, one of the members of the original Build Divers. She appears in the series as May's bodyguard during offline meetings.
During the final battle, she also uses her Diver avatar but is now equipped with a battle armor resembling the MA-04X Zakrello from Mobile Suit Gundam.
Aya Fujisawa (フジサワ・アヤ, Fujisawa Aya) / Ayame (アヤメ)
Voiced by: Manami Numakura (Japanese); Cherami Leigh (English)
A high schooler and a female diver dressed as a kunoichi, she is a member of the original Build Divers. She is very respectful to Par's good naming sense for SD Gunpla and for his Gunpla's special features.
During the BUILD DiVERS' training match and the battle against Alus' fleet, she pilots the RX-零 RX-Zeromaru as her main Gunpla. During the Gunpla Battle Royal, she pilots an unmodified GNT-0000 00 Qan[T] from Mobile Suit Gundam 00 the Movie: A Wakening of the Trailblazer. It is also revealed that out of non-SD Gundam characters Heero Yuy is her favorite.
Koichi Nanase (ナナセ・コウイチ, Nanase Kōichi) / KO-1 (コーイチ, Kōichi)
Voiced by: Atsushi Tamaru (Japanese); Kyle McCarley (English)
A member of the original Build Divers who also goes in the nickname "K-1" (ケイワン, Kei Wan), Koichi is a veteran Gunpla builder who builds rental units for The Gundam Base Tokyo and now works in the establishment prior to the first series. He is also responsible for the creation of the Build Decal System alongside the Mobile Doll with Tsukasa's help to allow EL-Divers to manifest into the real world. Due to a flashback it is implied that he was Sarah's caretaker when more EL-Divers got discovered and for the last 2 years.
During the final battle against Alus, both him and Tsukasa piloted the MHF-01DR Lord Astray Double Rebake, a customized Lord Astray Z from Mobile Suit Gundam SEED ASTRAY Princess of the Sky which allowed both divers to pilot one mobile suit and is armed with two forms, each tailored to both divers' fighting styles. Koichi controls the Gunpla's Cuardo Mode. His other Gunpla is the RMS-117G11 Galbaldy Rebake which he pilots alone during the BUILD DiVERS' training match.
Tsukasa Shiba (シバ・ツカサ, Shiba Tsukasa)
Voiced by: Taku Yashiro (Japanese); Khoi Dao (English)
A former GP-Duelist and a vertan builder who once had a grudge on GBN and was involved in the Break Decal Incident 2 years ago until he changed his ways. Alongside Koichi, they created the Build Decal System and the Mobile Doll system that allows EL-Divers to manifest into the real world. In GBN, his avatar, named Ansh, is a purple Haro with a menacing look, similar to Nena Trinity's Haro from Mobile Suit Gundam 00. When May wanted to make her own Gunpla he taught her how to do it and personally supervised her while she was making her custom Wodom. He still has a superiority complex and only logs in to GBN during emergencies and with Admin/Developer leashed.
During the final battle against Alus, both him and Koichi piloted the MHF-01DR Lord Astray Double Rebake, a customized Lord Astray Z from Mobile Suit Gundam SEED ASTRAY Princess of the Sky which allowed both divers to pilot one mobile suit and is armed with two forms, each tailored to both divers' fighting styles. Tsukasa control the Gunpla's Reverso Mode.
Kyoya Kisugi (キスギ・キョウヤ, Kisugi Kyōya) / Kyoya Kujo (クジョウ・キョウヤ, Kujō Kyōya)
Voiced by: Jun Kasama (Japanese); Mark Whitten (English)
The reigning champion of GBN and leader of the Force group "Avalon" (アヴァロン, Avaron), where Hiroto was formerly affiliated with before he left the group 2 years ago. It was he who invited Hiroto into Avalon when he met Hiroto by mere chance a few years before he met Riku. For the past two years he kept Hiroto's loss, burden, all data on him and Eve secret. Unwilling to delete their photos and logs, he attempted to bury them. Along with Karuna and Emilia, he was glad to see him again, and return to the fold. He was also happy to see Hiroto being social once more and that he was more stable than he was when he last saw him. In the final episode when he was talking to the game master and Ms. Tori in a real world meeting, more details are revealed from when he was a beta tester while GBN was still being developed.
He appears in the BUILD DiVERS' special battle piloting the AGE-TRYMAG Gundam TRY AGE Magnum, which its design is inspired and based on the AGE series units from Mobile Suit Gundam AGE and utilizes the TRY-AGE system on its weaponry including the ability to use cards based on the Gundam AGE mobile suits for enhancements. During the Gunpla Battle Royal, he pilots an unmodified ZGMF-X20A Strike Freedom Gundam from Mobile Suit Gundam SEED Destiny equipped with the METEOR support system.
Karuna (カルナ)
Voiced by: Yoshiki Nakajima (Japanese); Sean Chiplock (English)
One of the two Sub-Leaders of Avalon, who is a close friend and former senior of Hiroto while he was affiliated with the group 2 years ago, implying that Hiroto was in Avalon for years, along with the time Hiroto spent with Eve. He personally likes acting superior to Hiroto whenever he is trying to help Hiroto train. During the EL-Diver incident, Hiroto knew he would have accepted and understood his situation with losing Eve, however he knows he is terrible at keeping secrets. During the celebratory party at the Build Divers' Nest for the birth of Re:Rising Gundam and Hiroto's first special move, he reminds Hiroto that he is still part of Avalon, even if he is not in the actual force, and to come visit them.
He pilots the AGMF-X56S/l Impulse Gundam Lancier, a customised ZGMF-X56S Impulse Gundam, from the last few episodes of the previous series. Since He and Emilia could always beat Hiroto two on one, and they were both a strong duo at backing up and supporting the champion, this concept inspired their Impulses' gimmicks.
Riku Mikami (ミカミ・リク, Mikami Riku) / Riku (リク)
Voiced by: Yūsuke Kobayashi (Japanese); Erik Scott Kimerer (English)
The protagonist of the previous series and the founder, leader, and ace of the original "Build Divers" on which the name of Hiroto's group have originated from. During Hiroto's time in Avalon, he attempted to shoot him down after a heated battle between him and Kyoya while he allied with Ogre, for personal reasons. He was shocked and apologetic over Hiroto's loss before the battle with the Second Coalition of Volunteers, May having told him, Sarah, and his team about it. Only Sarah went with him when he went to reconcile and resolve things with Hiroto, considering he needed to offer to return her to him. However, Hiroto, remembering he already has May and having no real grudge against him, ended up thanking him and Sarah instead, knowing she has been in good hands all along and assured that Eve's loss was her own choice. The two befriended each other, promising to keep having gunpla battles again, with an eventual rematch. He also takes part in defending GBN against Alus, dealing the killing shot alongside Hiroto. He makes no appearance in Battlelog however it's implied that both teams ended up merging into one force and he gave Hiroto leadership of the overall force, though he remains the leader of his own team.
In the special battle against BUILD DiVERS and the final battle with Alus and his fleet he used the GN-0000DVR/SM Gundam 00 Sky Moebius as his main Gunpla which is an upgraded Gundam 00 Sky with newer parts and weapons.
Sarah (サラ, Sara)
Voiced by: Haruka Terui (Japanese); Kayli Mills (English)
A member of the original "Build Divers", one of the 87 EL-Divers and the first of them to be discovered in GBN. Due to that, for the past two years she has been the most well known EL-Diver. Unknowingly to her she was in fact the little sister of the first EL-Diver. May met her during the day she first entered the real world. She was shocked and saddened upon learning the truth about her older sister, Eve, and the true reason behind the outcome of that battle from May and realized Hiroto was the heartbroken Avalon member she saw with Karuna after Riku called out to her while she was in the Coalition's custody, hence the reason he fled. Regardless of Hiroto's two years of resentment towards the Build Divers and himself and never acknowledged her as a real Build Diver member, he left them alone for her sake and to honor Eve. Due to Hiroto's nightmare in his back story and why she kept her Pet, Mol, close, the latter knew of Eve, but didn't know who she was to her. Nevertheless, she was very touched by Hiroto's kindness for thanking Riku for saving her, finishing Eve's will, holding no grudge against the Build Divers, and knowing she had an older sister who went so far for her, even had the man she loved be the one to do it. Later on it is revealed that she along with Eve merited the faces of two of Alus's creators. Currently, Hiroto continues to view her as Eve's younger sister and May's sister.
When in GBN, she uses the HER-SELF Mobile Doll Sarah even for support during the battle against Alus's fleet.
Hellfire Ogre (獄炎のオーガ, Gokuen no Ōga)
Voiced by: Wataru Hatano (Japanese); Greg Chun (English)
Leader of Force group "Hyakki" (百鬼) and still Riku's main rival, he appeared in the series as one of the many divers who volunteered to train the BUILD DiVERS on their last mission in Eldora. He also gave some advice to Parviz regarding the strategy on Alus's units and their weaknesses.
In the series, he uses the RX-78GP02R天 Gundam GP-Rase-Two-Ten as his main Gunpla, created after upgrading the Gundam GP-Rase-Two out of his own frustration on not being able to play GBN due to the server's downtime.
Do-ji (ドージ, Dōji)
Voiced by: Yoshitsugu Matsuoka (Japanese); Derek Stephen Prince (English)
Ogre's younger brother and a member of Hyakki, he also appeared as part of the Coalition of Volunteers.
During the BUILD DiVERS' special match, he uses the GNX-803DG Do-ji GN-X as his main Gunpla, a combination of the GNX-803OG Ogre GN-X and the xvt-mmc Geara Ghirarga. In the final battle against Alus, he switched it out in favor of his old Gunpla, the xvt-mmc Geara Ghirarga.
Rommel (ロンメル, Ronmeru) / Captain Zeon (キャプテン・ジオン, Kyaputen Jion)
Voiced by: Show Hayami (Japanese); Patrick Seitz (Rommel), Mick Lauer (Captain Zeon) (English)
Leader of Force group "7th Panzer Division" (第七機甲師団, Dai Nana Kikōshidan), whose avatar in the GBN world has the form of an ermine. In the series, he also has an alternate account going by the name of Captain Zeon, who is a famous G-Tuber and a veteran diver, who hosts his own show of him keeping GBN safe. Shown to be dressed in a red superhero outfit, he has a huge sense of justice and enthusiasm, which inspires Kazami to be his fan. In the guise of Captain Zeon he builds a bond with Kazami similar to Riku and Kyoya.
When Rommel is in his Captain Zeon persona, he uses the RX-93N04 ν-Zeon Gundam as his main Gunpla, created as a fusion of both Earth Federation and Zeon designs and focuses on both Close to Mid-Range combat. As himself, he pilots the GH-001RB Grimore Red Beret. During the Gunpla Battle Royal, he pilots an unmodified GF13-017NJII God Gundam from Mobile Fighter G Gundam as Captain Zeon.
Arc (アーク, Āku)
Voiced by: Kaito Takeda (Japanese); Phillip Reich (English)
A character of the spin-off manga Gundam Build Divers BREAK and a former Mass Diver. Being a rowdy person, he has an aggressive personality and speaks with a Kansai dialect. Before his force was formed, he was once a Mass Diver who used Break Decals provided by Tsukasa and enjoyed its corrupted powers despite the fact that it was breaking GBN. In that fact and with some inspiration from another friend he fought alongside the First Coalition of Volunteers for redemption. After the Break Decal incident, he completely changed his ways, formed the force group "ZA-∀Z" with his friend Zen and became part of the Third Coalition of Volunteers. In the final episode, he and Zen are present in the battle against Alus's invasion fleet.
Ark's main Gunpla is the GF13-017NJ/B Gundam Shining Break, a customized GF13-017NJ Shining Gundam from Mobile Fighter G Gundam which is given a flight form called "Shining Berkut" unlike its base model. Due to their fighting styles, both Ark and Zen can also execute a combination move named "Hard Improvisation".
Zen (ゼン)
Voiced by: Yu Miyazaki
A character of the spin-off manga Gundam Build Divers BREAK and also a former Mass Diver. Zen was a close friend of Ark, who like him, also has been using Break Decals for fun and enjoyment despite its corrupting nature. However after the Break Decal incident, he changed his ways, formed the force group "ZA-∀Z" with his friend and became part of the Coalition of Volunteers. In the final episode, he and Ark are present in the battle against Alus's invasion fleet.
Zen's main Gunpla is the YG-III Gundam G-Else, a customized YG-111 Gundam G-Self from Gundam Reconguista in G equipped with the Grow Up Units in both of its arms and legs for offensive and defensive situations. With his and Ark's fighting styles, they can both execute a combination move named "Hard Improvisation".
Rize (リゼ)
Voiced by: Yūya Hirose (Japanese); Tom Bauer (English)
A character of the spin-off manga Gundam Build Diver Rize. He is one of the known 87 EL-Divers and the most recent one to appear, making him the 87th. He first appears as a mid teen boy in front of the diver user Tetsu (who eventually becomes his caretaker and father figure) and due to his sudden appearance, he was given that name after the first word that appeared in his head, "Rise". After that, he is given a Gunpla as a body with the help from both Koichi Nanase and Tsukasa Shiba; however, the body he inhabits in the real world is not a Mobile Doll, but a Gunpla based on Hiroto's Core Gundam that the latter saw it in the game, got impressed and told Tetsu how to build it, where it was modified with Mobile Doll Tech right after. His goal in the game is to surpass GBN's current champion, Kyoya Kujo. During the final battle against Alus, Rize assists the Third Coalition of Volunteers while protecting the Gaza Brothers after one of its members are down.
Rize's main Gunpla is the PFF-X7R Core Gundam [Rize], a replica of Hiroto's original Core Gundam built by Tetsu, following Rize's instructions. It is also the main body of Rize uses to inhabit in the real world. Also due to how the Core Gundam Rize is built it has the core-change gimmick. It can be equipped with the Anima Armor in battle similar to the Planets System theme, turning it into the PFF-X7R/ANIMA Gundam Anima [Rize] and with the Aun[Rize] Armor that also turns it into the Gundam Aun [Rize].
Game Master (ゲームマスター, Gēmumasutā) / Katsuragi (カツラギ, Katsuragi)
Voiced by: Eiji Takemoto (Japanese); Armen Taylor (English)
The head of the administrators of GBN who oversees its functions and security. His avatar is based on a SD Gundam Force character Gundiver. In the final battle against Alus, both him and Miss Tori use a customized GunPanzer. In real life, he is clad in a green shirt worn on top of a collared one.
Miss Tori (ミス・トーリ, Misu Tōri)
Voiced by: Mai Nakahara (Japanese); Ryan Bartley (English)
The developer and creator of GBN. Her avatar is based on the Crystal Phoenix from SD Sengokuden Densetsu no Daishogun. It is revealed that she was in the same location as Hiroto when the broadcast of Sarah's capture was made and where Eve was sacrificed to buy Sarah more time to be saved. In real life, she is a classy lady wearing a black hat with a fake phoenix feather and sunglasses.

=== Other characters ===
roEve (イヴ, Ivu)
Voiced by: Inori Minase (Japanese); Erika Harlacher (English)
A mysterious blonde girl who befriended Hiroto a few years prior to events of Gundam Build Divers; this friendship between the two soon escalated into romance. Since her disappearance, Hiroto has been searching for her throughout the game. It is later revealed that she is the first to exist of the 87 EL-Divers and Sarah's older sister, although through the few years she spent together with Hiroto and those close to him she kept her EL-Diver identity a secret, and she was seemingly affiliated with Avalon. She had many personality traits and abilities that Sarah has and more, most notably having empathic senses for people and gunpla. Her existence also caused glitch bugs in the game, but small ones that were not that harmful. However, a few years later, she could no longer contain Sarah's bugs due to the backlash from the Break-Decal incident. Before the events of the battle between the original Build Divers and the second Coalition of Volunteers, she pleaded with Hiroto to mercifully sacrifice her using the Core Gundam and promise to her that he will still be the same caring person to help others in need, especially her sister, also mentioning that she would only pass on into GBN's Sea of Data. Despite his plead to stop her, she ended up a sacrifice right before Hiroto's eyes and her form faded out of existence. This incident traumatized Hiroto greatly, leaving him with permanent emotional open wounds. He felt that clinging to Sarah for the rest of his life would help him move on to the point that led him to blame Riku and the Build Divers before ultimately sparing him in order to save Sarah's life and leaving Avalon to become a rogue diver, but kept a vow to never blame Sarah. In the final episode, May, another EL-Diver whom Hiroto teamed up with, is revealed to be born with some lingering remnants of her lost data, sporting her earring on her armband, which she wore under her jacket the whole time. Hiroto finally has closure but continues to view her has all the Build Divers' true Goddess of Victory, with Hinata as her priestess.
Osamu Kuga (クガ・オサム, Kuga Osamu)
Voiced by: Gō Inoue (Japanese); Tony Oliver (English)
Hiroto's father, who is a freelance writer and novelist. During the series, he suffers from writer's block and constantly forces himself to come up with stories by locking himself in his room. In the final episode, he manages to come up with at least one story regarding the phenomenal link between GBN and Eldora.
Yuriko Kuga (クガ・ユリコ, Kuga Yuriko)
Voiced by: Fumiko Orikasa (Japanese); Julie Ann Taylor (English)
Hiroto's mother who works as a translator. She has a completely different work ethic from her husband, but they both still get along well.
Ken Matsumura (マツムラ・ケン, Matsumura Ken)
Voiced by: Yōji Ueda (Japanese); Bill Rogers (English)
Manager of The Gundam Base Yokohama who is regarded as a Gunpla Meister. Ken is a fan of Henken Bekkener from Mobile Suit Zeta Gundam, to the point of sporting the character's mustache. During the final battle against Alus, he pilots a Gunperry carrying multiple armors for the Core Gundam II and tanks a shot from Alus who had stolen Hiroto's Earthree armor and weapons for Hiroto.
Mizuki Shido (シドー・ミズキ, Shidō Mizuki)
Voiced by: Chinatsu Akasaki (Japanese); Maureen Price (English)
Masaki's elder sister, who takes care of him in the hospital.

== Production ==
The series was first teased back in the Gundam 40th Anniversary Beyond Press conference back on November 11, 2018. On July 5, 2019, Sunrise teased the new series in a preview during the 40th anniversary promotional video. and revealed the official title during the 2019 Japan Expo in Paris. Both Twitter and official websites also confirm the new series. In the official press conference held on July 31, 2019, Sunrise revealed more on the series's characters and mobile suits alongside the series's staff. It is the first Gundam series produced by Sunrise Beyond, an animation studio established after Xebec's closure in March 2019.

The series's Original Net Animation format and its planned release for online viewing and steaming came from Sunrise Beyond's producer, Takuya Okamoto. He did stated that "The TV brand is still large, so there was some concern that the broadcast scale would decline, but there is a strong point in the Internet distribution that not only Japan but the entire world can be watched simultaneously." Despite the series's shift into online streaming, the show will still air on television through BS11.

== Media ==
=== Anime ===
The first season aired on Sunrise's Gundam Channel YouTube channel from October 10 to December 26, 2019, with Sunrise announcing a simulcast streaming on other platforms following with a TV airing on BS11 on October 12, 2019, and on Tokyo MX on January 28, 2020. A second season premiered on April 9, 2020. On April 27, it was announced that episodes from 19 onward would be delayed indefinitely due to the ongoing COVID-19 pandemic. On June 25, it was announced that it would resume on July 9. Spira Spica performed the series' first opening theme song "Re:RISE", while PENGUIN RESEARCH performs the second opening theme song "Hatena". SudannaYuzuYully performed the series' first ending theme song "Magic Time" while Spira Spica performed the second and third ending songs "Twinkle" and "Heartful" (the last song is used in the ending of episode 20). The series's music is composed by Hidemura Kimura.

No.	Title	Original release date
1	"Wandering Core Gundam"; Transliteration: "Hōkō no Koa Gandamu" (Japanese: 彷徨のコアガンダム)	October 10, 2019
Gunpla Battle Nexus Online is upgraded to version 1.78, which adds numerous new features to the game. After clearing a difficult enemy by himself, Hiroto is approached by another player named Kazami, who wants to team up with him. However, Hiroto refuses since he's not interested in Gunpla battles. In the real world, it's revealed that Hiroto is in fact searching for a girl he had met in the game several years ago before the Build Divers existed, recoiling at their name. A girl who had a striking resemblance to Sarah, except with blonde hair and aqua green eyes. Meanwhile, his friend Hinata decides to apply for a job at the Gundam cafe near his local Gunpla store. When Hiroto logs back into the game, he's recruited by Kazami to investigate a secret mission that can take them to an unexplored part of the game. They along with two other players, May and Parviz, discover a dog-like NPD named Freddie requesting help, and they accept the mission. While the group initially has trouble fighting the enemies, Hiroto's intervention eventually secures their victory. The game then automatically requests to register their group as "BUILD DIVERS", with May quickly changing the name to "BUILD DiVERS" to differentiate themselves from the original BUILD DIVERS.
2	"Unknown Mission"; Transliteration: "Shira Rezaru Misshon" (Japanese: 知られざるミッション)	October 10, 2019
The next day, it is revealed that May is working with Magee to investigate the secret missions. When Hiroto logs into GBN, he and the rest of the BUILD DiVERS are transported back to the secret Dimension, having been summoned by Freddie once again. Parviz theorizes that they have triggered a special story quest which requires them to complete a chain of missions in order to clear. Freddie leads the BUILD DiVERS to his village where his sister Maiya and their father, the village chief, live. The village Chief explains that an army of hostile machines called the One-Eyes have recently appeared and begun attacking villages, with the villagers' only options being to flee or hope for help from the Resistance. The BUILD DiVERS agree to help protect the village from an expected One-Eyes attack, though Parviz has reservations due to his inexperience in gunpla battle. Hiroto is only interested in continuing since he might find the girl he is looking for in the secret Dimension. Hiroto prepares a special training simulation to prepare for the mission, but they are only barely able to complete it after multiple tries. That evening, Hiroto is uncomfortable at the thought of being unable to fully protect the village, but receives reassurance from Hinata who reminds him that he always finds a way out of trouble.
3	"A Place to Protect"; Transliteration: "Mamorubeki Basho" (Japanese: 守るべき場所)	October 17, 2019
Hiroto revises the plan to defend the village. Instead of splitting their team to defend two entrances simultaneously, the BUILD DiVERS decide to block one of the entrances and funnel the One-Eyes through the other. The villagers reluctantly accept the plan. It's later revealed that Hiroto's determination to protect the village stems from his bond with the girl in his past, who told him that even though GBN's world is artificial, it's still something worth protecting. That night, the One-Eyes assault the village. The BUILD DiVERS are able to hold them back after a tough battle, but a One-Eyes unit is able to penetrate their defenses and attack the village. Hiroto is able to intercept the One-Eyes by switching to his Mars Armor, which is specialized in close combat, and destroys the One-Eyes while causing minimal collateral damage to the village. Afterwards, a Resistance squad led by Freddie and Maiya's older brother Jed arrives, and they are shocked at the presence of the BUILD DiVERS. Kazami remarks to Hiroto that they must have unlocked the next story mission. Meanwhile, a mysterious entity observes the BUILD DiVERS.
4	"Wounded Wings"; Transliteration: "Kizutsuita Tsubasa" (Japanese: 傷ついた翼)	October 24, 2019
While Jed is reluctant to trust the BUILD DiVERS at first, he ultimately accepts their offer of assistance and explains that the Resistance is planning to attack a One-Eyes base in the desert. However, the base is protected with an impenetrable barrier and the only entrance is heavily guarded. The BUILD DiVERS agree to return in 3 days, which is the time needed for the Resistance to organize. Jed decides to recruit Freddie into the Resistance since only he knows how to summon the BUILD DiVERS, which angers Maiya. The next day, the BUILD DiVERS take on a regular mission to train for the battle. While pursuing the enemy, Parviz hesitates when he tries to fly, resulting in Hiroto having to save him. It is later revealed that even though the Valkylander is capable of flight, Parviz refuses to fly due to his fear of heights. On the day of the mission, Hiroto, Kazami, and May gather, but Parviz does not appear.
5	"Now Spread Your Wings"; Transliteration: "Ima, Tsubasa Hirogete" (Japanese: いま、翼ひろげて)	October 31, 2019
On the day of the operation, Parviz is late to arrive. Lamenting his previous incompetence, he tells the other BUILD DiVERS that he wants to quit. Kazami opposes Parviz's decision while Hiroto and May remain indifferent. The team is summoned to the village before a final decision can be made, as Jed's team is ready to assault the One-Eyes base. Parviz still remains reluctant to participate, afraid of being a burden to the team, so Hiroto suggests a compromise after having a pep-talk with him and sharing a very familiar philosophy about feelings and gunpla. Parviz will focus on protecting Jed and his team while rest of the BUILD DiVERS distract the base guard. The plan goes well initially, with the BUILD DiVERS managing to distract the advanced base guard while Jed's team infiltrates the base. Jed successfully demolishes the base, but the battle is further complicated with the appearance of a second base guard and a trio of flying One-Eyes units. Realizing everybody is in danger, Parviz finally overcomes his fear and transforms his Valkylander into its true form, its Dragon Fusion Mode. With Parviz's help, the BUILD DiVERS are able to eliminate all of the One-Eyes units. Meanwhile, another Resistance team is apparently wiped out by a mysterious Gundam.
6	"Hero on the Brink"; Transliteration: "Gakeppuchi no Hīrō" (Japanese: 崖っぷちのヒーロー)	November 7, 2019
While Parviz experienced great growth in the previous mission, Kazami alone is resentful at his own inability to distinguish himself. Meanwhile, the BUILD DiVERS head for the Resistance base where they meet one of the Resistance leaders, Gorus. Gorus informs them that they want the BUILD DiVERS to help them move to a safer location for their base. Kazami is openly frustrated since that would mean there is little chance for any fighting where he can distinguish himself. Another Resistance leader, Muran, expresses his distrust of the BUILD DiVERS but both Jed and Freddie vouch for their loyalty. Gorus then warns them about the Seltsam, a unique One-Eyes unit that resembles a Gunpla. In order to prepare for the transport mission, Parviz suggests that they join a player vs player match to simulate the unpredictability of an ambush. They then encounter Kazami's old team led by Gojo, who are surprised Kazami is still playing GBN and are willing to challenge them. However, the BUILD DiVERS are easily defeated by Gojo's team when Kazami falls for a feint and charges out of position. Gojo observes that Kazami still hasn't changed, and that Hiroto doesn't appear to trust his own team due to his lack of communication with them. Hiroto then visits Hinata, who points out to him that people don't like to be ignored, even if the attention they get can be negative.
7	"Battered Crown"; Transliteration: "Kizudarake no Eikan" (Japanese: 傷だらけの栄冠)	November 14, 2019
Both Hiroto and Kazami are both still on awkward terms, even after Gojo asked Hiroto to look after Kazami. Hiroto wonders why he is where he is and mentions the girl in his past name, which is "Eve". Suddenly, the One-Eyes attack the Resistance base, forcing the Resistance to evacuate early. Muran takes Freddie in his truck, but separates from the main convoy in an attempt to elude the One-Eyes. Kazami, unaware Freddie is with Muran, considers leaving Muran to his fate due to his dislike of him. However, remembering Gojo's words to him, Kazami orders Hiroto to protect Muran. While Hiroto save Freddie and Muran, the rest of the BUILD DiVERS work to protect the convoy. Kazami is quickly overwhelmed by the One-Eyes and his Gunpla is critically damaged. At his lowest point, Kazami remembers a lesson from his hero, Captain Zeon, telling him that he should follow his own passion for Gunpla in his heart. Inspired, Kazami decides to keep fighting just as Hiroto returns, and with his help, Kazami is able to score his first destruction point. However, their victory is short lived when the Seltsam arrives, destroys the abandoned Resistance base, and then attacks the BUILD DiVERS, who are heavily outmatched and are barely able to escape. When they rendezvous with the Resistance, they are entrusted with a mysterious locket by Muran, which according to him is supposed to be the key to turning the tide against the One-Eyes.
8	"Duty and Illusion"; Transliteration: "Shimei to Gen'ei" (Japanese: 使命と幻影)	November 21, 2019
May relays what she has learned to Magee, but he tells her that GBN has no data on the Seltsam or if it even belongs to a diver or not. Despite Magee's prodding, May claims that the BUILD DiVERS really aren't a team in the traditional sense, but admits that she may find what she's looking for if she stays with them. The BUILD DiVERS then meet up for the next stage in the story mission. They arrive at the Resistance's new headquarters at the island city of Seguri, which is protected by an energy shield. The commander of the Resistance, Abiree, welcomes them while Gorus tells them their next mission is to engage an undersea monster so the Resistance can scout the Silver Tower, an important One-Eyes stronghold. Parviz suggests they take the Grand Dive Challenge to practice underwater combat. Meanwhile, May asks Hiroto what his motivation is, and he merely tells her he is searching for something that can't be found. The next day, the BUILD DiVERS start the Grand Dive Challenge, where they must get a Haro past team Granada Bleu while underwater. Kazami and Parviz are easily eliminated and Hiroto is only able to clear the challenge by using his Mercuone Gundam and leaving May behind as a decoy. Seeing how the rest of the team aren't suited for underwater battle, Hiroto decides to take on the upcoming stage by himself. May concedes it is the most efficient plan, but asks if it's really enough, which reminds Hiroto of a similar question that Eve asked him in the past, realizing..........she could be an EL-Diver.
9	"Abyss of Isolation"; Transliteration: "Kakuzetsu no Fuchi Kara" (Japanese: 隔絶の淵から)	November 28, 2019
Despite May's skepticism, Hiroto is still determined to complete the mission on his own. As the rest of team talks with Freddie, they wonder why an experienced player like Hiroto tries to avoid team battles so much. As they near the Silver Tower, they realize it's an orbital elevator connecting to space. They are then attacked by a massive aquatic One-Eyes unit. Meanwhile, Hinata decides to investigate what caused Hiroto to become so antisocial, and connects the timing of his attitude change to the day of the Second Coalition of Volunteers' battle. Meanwhile, Hiroto has difficulty fighting the One-Eyes unit and is knocked unconscious, where he has a flashback of when he attempted to fight a rogue boss by himself. While successful, the entire surrounding city was destroyed in the battle. May rescues Hiroto and advises that they all work as a team to defeat the One-Eyes unit. Together, they are able to pull the One-Eyes out of the water with a harpoon and destroy it in a combined attack. Hiroto thanks everyone for the support and apologizes for any misunderstandings he may have caused, saving May for last. From May's response, Hiroto is reminded of how Eve in his past pointed out that he should fight for someone he cares about, not for the sake of fighting. Suddenly, the Seltsam attacks and corners Hiroto, but is saved again by May, who reveals that she is an EL-Diver, with his hunch about her being right.
10	"The Ones Who Breathe There"; Transliteration: "Soko ni Aru Ibuki" (Japanese: そこにある息吹)	December 5, 2019
May reveals herself as an EL-Diver and attacks the Seltsam, managing to get the upper hand on it. She asks the Seltsam's pilot if they are Masaki Shidoh, but the Seltsam retreats without answering. With the mission cleared, the Resistance seizes the base of the Silver Tower, giving them access to outer space. May admits she is one of the 87 EL-Divers discovered starting with Sarah. Back in the real world, Hiroto appears to carry over a head a real injury he suffered during the previous battle. In a flash back he is shown to have been in Avalon and might have been the friend that Kyoya was referring to when Kyoya first met Riku and was about to shoot Riku's 00 Sky down with a mystery weapon. Hinata becomes more worried about Hiroto's relationship with the girl in his past, after hearing about EL-Divers and finding out about a several day event called the "Second Coalition of Volunteers' Battle" and the "EL-Diver Incident" that started around the same time a night he came home crying in the rain. The next night, the BUILD DiVERS celebrate the annual Space Crossing festival at the village. The festival concludes with the villagers releasing lanterns into the sky to commemorate those that passed away and to honor the spirits watching over them. Later on, May stumbles upon Hiroto trying to privately release a lantern that went out and failed to fly away. Upon which, Hiroto then asks May whether an EL-Diver dies permanently if they disappear or if there is a way to bring them back to life. At that moment, May guesses that what Hiroto is searching for is another EL-Diver.
11	"Last Mission"; Transliteration: "Rasuto Misshon" (Japanese: ラストミッション)	December 12, 2019
The BUILD DiVERS return to the Silver Tower, where they discover that the pendant Muran gave them acts as the key to unlock the Tower. Suspecting the One-Eyes have prepared a trap for them, the BUILD DiVERS decide to spend the next three days preparing for a likely space battle. On the day of the mission, the BUILD DiVERS ride the space elevator into orbit, where they learn from Freddie the planet is not called Earth, but Eldora. Upon reaching the top of the space elevator, the BUILD DiVERS are led to a facility on the surface of Eldora's moon. Entering the facility, they encounter an artificial intelligence called Alus, which explains it is protecting Eldora while it waits for its creators to return. Freddie then pleads with Alus to stop the One-Eyes' attacks on his people, but Alus instead turns hostile and targets Seguri for destruction. The BUILD DiVERS evacuate the facility and discover the moon is actually an orbital cannon. They are then met by a massive army of One-Eyes led by the Seltsam.
12	"The Shuddering World"; Transliteration: "Furueru Sekai" (Japanese: 震える世界)	December 19, 2019
The BUILD DiVERS fight the One-Eyes army and the Seltsam while desperately trying to stop the orbital cannon. In the occasion, Hiroto confronts the Seltsam one on one and learns to his surprise that it is piloted by a human. May tries to destroy the cannon with Par covering her and culling the One-Eyes. Kazami tries to force his way back into the moon base to destroy Alus while culling as many One-Eyes as he can. Despite their best efforts to, they fail to prevent the cannon from firing at Seguri, obliterating the city along with Jed and the Resistance. Hiroto and the others are blasted away by the cannon's beam and are barely able to return safely to the surface, during the atmosphere re-entry Hiroto considers doing something crude, however a familiar voice hollers his name in attempt to stop him, which he recoils. They are all in shock of the crater that was left behind where Seguri once stood and most of the water evaporated. Filled with regret, they make their way back to Freddie's village, upon which they reveal to the others what happened to the city and the villagers mourn Jed's death and their relatives who lived in Seguri. While wondering why the story mode did not end as they failed their mission, Kazami realizes that the villagers are truly suffering and that their situation is not part of a game, but real. Suddenly, all GBN users are forcibly logged out from the system, including the BUILD DiVERS. Back in the real world, Hiroto learns that servers are mysteriously shutting down across the globe, interfering with communications worldwide.
13	"Somewhere in This Universe"; Transliteration: "Kono Sora no Dokokade" (Japanese: この宇宙(そら)のどこかで)	December 26, 2019
Amidst the news that an energy surge originated from a planet 30 light years away from Earth was responsible for the malfunction of communications worldwide, May arranges a meeting with the other BUILD DiVERS in person unkowingly along with Nanami as a hired body guard for May. She introduces them to Masaki Shidoh, a veteran Diver who has been in a coma for six months. There is no record of him logging out of GBN, implying that his mind is still connected in the system. May also reveals that he is the pilot of the Seltsam and shows them a picture of him with other Eldorans. In addition, the GBN administrators confirmed to May that Eldora is not part of the game. The other BUILD DiVERS come to the realization that Eldora is not part of GBN, but a real planet, and that they were risking their lives in a real war. With this revelation, Kazami and Parviz lose their resolve to keep fighting with May and she bids farewell to them. Hiroto, seeing Nanami carrying May away and seeing what an EL-Diver life is like IRL, decides to not cling to false hope anymore. Thanks to a pep-talk from Hinata and deciding to keep honoring his memories of Eve, Hiroto gives his Core Gundam an upgrade and later on once access to GBN is reestablished, May is about to return to Eldora when her fellow BUILD DiVERS appear to join her, each deciding to continue for their own reasons, with Hiroto resolving to not allow anyone to suffer the way he did. Suddenly, Freddie contacts the BUILD DiVERS asking for help, and the four depart together to assist him.
14	"Encounters, and Then…"; Transliteration: "Meguriai, Soshite" (Japanese: めぐりあい、そして)	April 9, 2020
Three Earth years before meeting the BUILD DiVERS, Freddie used to explore the nearby ruins when one day, he managed to establish connections to GBN, and since then he regularly returned there to watch the exploits of the original Build Divers, and made a vow someday to summon them to help save his people and his planet. Two years went by, until one day, he and Stola stumbled across a scout unit of the One-Eyes and the villagers concluded that an attack from them was imminent. When the One-Eyes finally set their eyes on the village, Freddie ran to the ruins where he managed to access contact in GBN, unknowingly he was not able to pick who he wanted to contact. At that point, Hiroto and the others answer his call and Freddie enlist their help and thought they were part of the Build Divers Force but a different unit. Back to the present, after the destruction of Seguri City, access to the ruins was blocked and he could not contact the BUILD DiVERS anymore. Thanks to a mysterious pep-talk from Jed's ghost, Freddie is reminded that most everything else can still be saved. Knowing that the One-Eyes army will eventually return, and with the Resistance destroyed, Asha is scared and crying. Freddie becomes inspired and promises Asha he will return with the BUILD DiVERS, then goes back and digs his way into the ruins and falls asleep after all that hard work. After having a dream of being tossed into a massive GBN space battle and Hiroto, in his newly upgraded gunpla, protecting him from the Seltsam, Freddie awakens with reestablished connections to GBN and contacts Hiroto and his friends, asking for their help once more. Meanwhile, a massive creature awakens in another temple.
15	"Mission, Again"; Transliteration: "Misshon, Futatabi" (Japanese: 使命(ミッション)、再び)	April 16, 2020
The BUILD DiVERS are summoned back to Eldora, but are shocked to discover that their Gunpla have not been fully summoned, with only the base forms of Hiroto and May's Gunpla being summoned and Kazami and Parviz's failing to appear at all. Freddie explains that all along, the BUILD DiVERS were being summoned by the "Shining Sand", which is only found at the temple and would construct their bodies and Gunpla, basically like giant molding machine. However, Alus's satellite attack damaged the temple and blew away all the Shining Sand. They return to the village where they encounter Muran, who managed to escape the destruction of Seguri. Muran points the BUILD DiVERS to three other discovered temples they may find more Shining Sand at. Hiroto correctly guesses that Muran knew Masaki and his initial distrust of the BUILD DiVERS stems from Masaki's apparent betrayal, for which he informs Muran that maybe Masaki didn't choose to betray anyone, only saying that on a strong hunch, due to meeting his sister IRL and hearing about what he is really like. Hiroto and May head to the northern temple, Kazami and Maiya head to the southern temple, and Parviz, Freddie, and Muran head to the eastern temple. Hiroto and May defeat a trio of upgraded One-Eyes units but find no Shining Sand at the northern temple. Hiroto observes that the One-Eyes actively avoid damaging the temples. Kazami feels guilty for being partially responsible for Jed's death, and is conflicted on whether to tell Maiya or not. Muran explains to Parviz and Freddie that the eastern temple actually floats in the sky and serves as the home of the sacred beast Cuadorn, which is supposed to be Eldora's protector. Muran provides a hot air balloon to Parviz and Freddie and instructs them to meet Cuadorn personally. Meanwhile, Masaki appears to be going berserk as he begins attacking One-Eyes units.
16	"To the Heavenly Land"; Transliteration: "Tenkū no Daichi e" (Japanese: 天空の大地へ)	April 23, 2020
Kazami and Maiya reach the southern temple, but find that it is too damaged to use. Kazami finally admits his partial fault in the destruction of Seguri and Jed's death, but Maiya, who already knew, forgives him instantly. Hiroto and May then arrive, where they encounter Stola and Resistance remnants, who are protecting a nearby village. However, the village is discovered by a One-Eyes scout, meaning an attack will arrive in three days. Since the village is full of refugees who are in no condition to evacuate, Hiroto, May, and Kazami head for the eastern temple but are ambushed by a One-Eyes unit controlled directly by Alus, which has also copied the Core Change system Hiroto's Gunpla uses. Meanwhile, Parviz and Freddie ride the balloon and manage to reach the eastern temple which is still intact and full of Shining Sand. They also meet Cuadorn, who Parviz notices is visibly damaged. Cuadorn summons a lightning storm that forces Alus to withdraw and then lands the eastern temple, allowing the rest of the BUILD DiVERS and Muran to meet him as well. In the real world, Hinata meets her senior classmate from the Archery Dojo Mizuki Shidoh, who is also Masaki's sister. Back at the eastern temple, even though Cuadorn acknowledges he owes a debt to the "people of the Gunpla", he asks the BUILD DiVERS to leave.
17	"The Sacred Beast Cuadorn"; Transliteration: "Seijū Kuadorun" (Japanese: 星獣クアドルン)	April 30, 2020
Cuadorn reveals that Alus is an artificial intelligence developed by the ancient people of Eldora to protect the planet, but after a war that devastated the planet, Alus was put into hibernation while the Ancients left to find a new home. Ages later, Alus awakened and believed that the current inhabitants of Eldora are intruders, so he started attacking them. In response, Cuadorn summoned Masaki to assist him against Alus, and Alus accessed GBN's data to create the One-Eyes' mobile suits to counter them, before capturing and brainwashing Masaki. Cuadorn also reveals that the Shining Sand was part of a system that was created by a small portion of the Ancients, who stayed behind to see there world flourish again. Originally, they developed it to digitally transfer themselves back to Eldora by converting themselves into data. Although they died in the conversion, a small piece of data survived through the ages, which has somehow proved compatible with GBN and transmitted itself there. Despite learning the truth, the BUILD DiVERS refuse to leave and reaffirm their will to protect their friends on Eldora, convincing Cuadorn to accept their help. They send Muran to instruct the villagers to take refuge at the ancient ruins, which the One-Eyes units will not attack, while making plans to confront Alus before he fires his satellite cannon again. The BUILD DiVERS decide to return to Earth to prepare and promise to return to Eldora in two days to protect the nearby village that is an imminent target. The team make preparations with Hiroto taking out a sealed armor, the Uranus armor, inspired by a pep-talk from his father. Meanwhile Hinata learns about Masaki's condition, and is worried about Hiroto's safety.
18	"Perfect Sniper"; Transliteration: "Kanpeki na Sogekisha" (Japanese: 完璧な狙撃者)	May 7, 2020
The BUILD DiVERS return to Eldora, where they are able to properly summon their Gunpla and assist the refugees evacuating to the ruins while fending off the One-Eyes after them, until Alus joins the fight with his Mobile Suit, driving Hiroto and the others into a corner with his sniping skills, explaining that he had observed Hiroto's battles in GBN and learned from him, claiming to be the "perfect" version of him with Hiroto shocked that Alus was able to get pictures of him, including recorded logs that he had a chance to snipe Riku during a certain large scale battle and had the chance to win with ease. This concluded all logs and files of him were not erased as he wanted. When Kazami spots Freddie and Stola run around the battlefield while helping a civilian to escape, he jumps in to protect them and Hiroto takes advantage of the situation to pinpoint Alus' location and launch a counterattack, while the other BUILD DiVERS keep protecting the refugees. Hiroto confronts and defeats Alus, but while his friends celebrate, Hiroto himself is disheartened because he broke a promise he made to Eve in the past and decides to tell his story to his comrades of how he discovered more EL-Divers and why he was about to shoot Riku down. Upon which he stares at the thrusted up Beam Shoot Rifle in gloom and depression as if it were...... a gravestone.
19	"If It Weren't for You"; Transliteration: "Kimi ga Inakereba" (Japanese: 君がいなければ)	July 9, 2020
Several years ago, when GBN was about to take over Gunpla Battle completely, Hiroto, answering to a request from his friends, participated in a Gunpla Duel piloting a hastily built Speed Grade RX-78-2 Gundam against a veteran player using a Perfect Grade GAT-X105 Strike Gundam. Despite the huge disadvantage, Hiroto won by utilizing the parts of other Gunpla destroyed by the enemy. This inspired him to develop the Core Gundam, but during his first time piloting it in GBN, the Gunpla malfunctioned and he made a forced landing. In the occasion, he met Eve and the two became close. Their adventures began when Hiroto decided to make a gunpla that could customize parts while in battle using armor and Eve would take him to explore landscapes and scenery to inspire his sense of aesthetics. One of which was the fireweed garden that Riku, Sarah, and Yukio would eventually end up going to. They kept doing so including doing missions, pvp tournaments, and skill challenge tournaments to develop additional armors for the Core Gundam, thus creating the core-change gimmick, and the Planets System. One night Hiroto had a nightmare of Eve's highly possible outcome, where he saw a slightly older version of Eve absorbing the bugs from Sarah, causing Eve much pain. Not long afterwards, he joined a Force by her suggestion and became a member of Avalon, by Kyoya's invitation when he stumbled upon Hiroto training out in the open and was amazed by his Gunpla's gimmick and his skills in handling it. Both Hiroto and Eve came closer together in GBN, with Hiroto giving Eve an earring and the two taking a memorial photograph. A few years went by where they made many happy memories together, until one day when Eve requested Hiroto to erase her...
20	"A Wish Entrusted"; Transliteration: "Takusareta Negai" (Japanese: 託された願い)	July 16, 2020
Eve revealed to Hiroto of her origins and that she was absorbing the bugs Sarah was inadvertently creating, but after the First Coalition of Volunteers battle (which Hiroto joined in), she had reached her limit and the bugs risked being released, which would destroy GBN. Hiroto, despite his pleas to Eve against dying, reluctantly allowed his Core Gundam to give her a fatal shot remotely by borrowing her EL-Diver power. As she was fading, Eve asked Hiroto to always be someone who helps others, and to help EL-Divers like her, especially her little sister, Sarah, who was captured by Avalon, his own force, the day after. On the night Riku called out to Sarah and right after he left, it's revealed that Sarah and Hiroto spotted each other briefly before she went back inside, with Hiroto unaware the way that was found to save Sarah involved something Eve would have rejected. Hiroto later joined the Second Coalition of Volunteers battle against the original Build Divers right when Hyakki joined in for third party reasons. Hiroto, completely withstanding the giant impact, aims and locks on Riku. Just when he was about to snipe Riku's battered Gundam 00 Sky, he remembered his promise to Eve and her last words, and thus refrained, redirecting his shot into the ground. After telling the whole story to his friends, Hiroto voices his regret over not doing his best to help others like he promised to Eve, and is comforted by May, who encourages him to cry freely. Hiroto later apologizes to Freddie for pretending that he and the others were the real Build Divers. Freddie, on the other hand, reassures Hiroto that he kept his promise to Eve by helping his people against the One-Eyes and is happy for meeting them. May reminds Hiroto that Sarah and all the other EL-Divers could flourish in GBN because of his choice; upon hearing May, Hiroto realizes he was not only keeping his promise to Eve, but that all of his actions benefited everyone one way or another, and since GBN's sea of data is much closer than heaven, Eve has been watching over him all along, upon which he smirks in relief and is happy with his four new friends as he truly begins to cope. Elsewhere, a deranged Masaki fights his brainwashing while defending the Eldorans against the One Eyes' forces while his health back in the real world begins to decline.
21	"To Fly Once More"; Transliteration: "Mōichido Tobu Tame ni" (Japanese: もういちど飛ぶために)	July 23, 2020
Hiroto and the others have an offline meeting to make plans for their imminent confrontation with Alus. In the occasion, Kazami asks for help to create a new Gunpla and Parviz comes up with an idea to fix Cuadorn's broken wing with Gunpla parts. At Eldora, they hear from Muran that the Seltsam was seen fighting the One-Eyes and Cuadorn theorizes that the damage the BUILD DiVERS inflicted on the Seltsam in the space battle damaged the system Alus was using to control Masaki, allowing him to resist his brainwashing. The BUILD DiVERS decide to face Masaki once more in order to help him fully break away from Alus' control. In real life, Kazami completes his new Gunpla and Hiroto touches up his Saturn Armor with his favorite photo of him and Eve still out, but no longer distracted by it. Afterwards, while accompanying Hiroto after school, Hinata is informed by Mizuki that her brother's condition is worsening, and upon learning this, Hiroto reveals the truth to her, promising to rescue Masaki and return safely. Back at Eldora, Kazami reveals his new Gunpla, the Aegis Knight, and departs with Hiroto and May to look for Masaki, while Parviz stays behind to finish repairs on Cuadorn.
22	"Seltsam's Deadline"; Transliteration: "Kokugen no Zerutozāmu" (Japanese: 刻限のゼルトザーム)	July 30, 2020
As Masaki's condition in the real world deteriorates, Hiroto, May, and Kazami leave to confront the Seltsam while Parviz remains behind to repair Cuadorn's wing. Hiroto's group soon encounters the Seltsam battling a large One-Eyes force, and a vicious three way battle commences. During the battle, Masaki pleads for Hiroto to kill him, as he feels immense guilt over being forced to betray Cuadorn and the New Eldorans. Alus himself then intervenes with his Core Gundam in its Earthree armor as well as copies of the Nu and Arche Gundams, intent on retrieving Masaki. With his wing repaired, Cuadorn then arrives on the field with Parviz and manages to disable the Seltsam. He then prepares to destroy the Seltsam and kill Masaki to end his suffering, but Hiroto and May intervene, convincing him that Masaki can still be saved. Cuadorn then shifts to distracting Alus while Hiroto and Kazami work together to take down the Seltsam, with Hiroto being able to remove the corrupted parts. Alus then retreats, wondering why he keeps losing in his encounters with Hiroto's team. Masaki is finally freed from Alus' control and his consciousness returns to his body in the real world, where he finally recovers from his coma. Meanwhile, Magee publicizes information about the BUILD DiVERS' exploits to the GBN population under the guise of seeking assistance to clear a game mission, which immediately begins receiving offers of help.
23	"Moment of Choice"; Transliteration: "Sentaku no Toki" (Japanese: 選択のとき)	August 6, 2020
Hiroto's group is visited by Masaki, who apologizes to them for all the trouble he caused under Alus' control, and thanks them for rescuing him, while explaining that the satellite cannon was damaged during their previous fight there, thus it will take longer for it to become fully operational again. Mizuki appears soon after and asks them to not have her brother involved with their battle anymore. At Eldora, the BUILD DiVERS discuss ways to reach the moon without using the space elevator, when May points out that Alus should not be destroyed, given that he is simply following his programming and does not know any better. The group agrees to try to stop Alus without destroying him, despite Muran's reservations. While the team develops new equipment for the upcoming battle in space, May introduces the others to Magee, who had publicized the BUILD DiVERS' exploits which has garnered them a huge amount of public sympathy, praise, and support within GBN. With many Forces volunteering to help the BUILD DiVERS train for their upcoming battle against Alus, Magee arranges a special event for the BUILD DiVERS to face off against GBN's most elite divers, including members from Avalon and suggests the original Build Divers should be a part of it as well.
24	"Build Divers"; Transliteration: "Birudo Daibāzu" (Japanese: ビルドダイバーズ)	August 13, 2020
As the BUILD DiVERS prepare for their training match in the form of an updated Lotus Challenge, Hiroto briefly reunites with his former Avalon forcemates and they are formally introduced to the original Build Divers. The BUILD DiVERS proceed with the challenge with the additional condition that they will instantly fail if even one of them is shot down. During the Lotus Challenge, the BUILD DiVERS face off against not only Riku and the Build Divers, but also Rommel and his 7th Panzer Division, Ogre and Hyakki, and Kyouya and Avalon. Meanwhile, Mizuki watches Kazami's records of the BUILD DiVERS' exploits on Eldora, and comes to understand Masaki's plight a little more. She convinces the hospital to release Masaki early and gives him her blessing to help the BUILD DiVERS on the condition he return home safely. Back in GBN, on their 40th try, the BUILD DiVERS are finally able to break through the opposition and beat the Lotus Challenge after unlocking their team's Special Move, with everyone surprised at seeing something they haven't seen since the First Coalition of Volunteers Battle. The participants celebrate afterwards, with it being implied that Rommel is actually Captain Zeon. May, knowing deep down Hiroto is still not quite comfortable, arranges for Hiroto to meet Riku and Sarah privately, having just told the Build Divers about Eve and what happened behind the scenes and the true nature of how more EL-Divers got discovered, with Kyoya bringing logs and old photos since she knows that Hiroto knows they weren't deleted. Riku desperately apologizes to Hiroto, but Hiroto insists that he holds no grudge against Riku and his team, also telling them it was Eve's wish for Sarah's survival, to ensure that they would both be happy, and help GBN flourish. Hiroto thanks them for helping him keep his promise, and both Riku and Sarah accept him as a part of the Build Divers family. The two aces of both teams promise to continue having Gunpla battles and rise back up together by trading each other's wishes as Hiroto gains closure. After returning to the real world, Hiroto has a talk with Hinata about what transpired. Hinata implies that she intends to play GBN even if there is not much for her to do and the two promise to continue to support each other in their own ways. Hiroto is pumped to return to Eldora for the final battle and Hinata for an important bow ritual.
25	"To the Tomorrow I Envision"; Transliteration: "Boku ga kaku mirai e" (Japanese: 僕が描く未来(あした)へ)	August 20, 2020
Early in the morning, both Hiroto and Hinata head out to take on their own challenges. Hinata prepares for her bow ceremony, with Mizuki and Hiroto's parents present to cheer her on. Meanwhile, Hiroto and the BUILD DiVERS return to Eldora with the people giving the heroes their blessings and Freddie wanting to ride with Hiroto while the resistance heads out for one last stand to do their part. As the team is about to head out, Masaki unexpectedly joins them with everyone now together. While the Resistance stages a diversionary attack on the Silver Tower, Hiroto uses his new Nepteight Gundam to carry the BUILD DiVERS into orbit, catching Alus off guard. The BUILD DiVERS clash with the One-Eyes forces as Masaki and Cuadorn join in to help. All the while, Kazami is live-streaming the battle so that the general public can spectate it as well, including Mizuki and Hiroto's parents. The BUILD DiVERS are eventually able to break through the One-Eyes' forces and Alus's Eldoran Core Gundams. After Freddie vents his feelings to Alus, the team contribute parts of their own Gunpla to Hiroto to form the Re:Rising Gundam, which is what was used to defeat the Eldoran style Lotus Challenge. With his new Gundam, Hiroto is able to destroy Alus' orbital cannon while at the same time back on Earth, Hinata hits her target and succeeds in completing the bow ritual. Realizing that the Divers will continue to interfere with his plans, Alus angrily decides to directly destroy them all by forcefully uploading himself and his massive warfleet into GBN, intent on destroying the game. However, he is immediately met by the Third Coalition of Volunteers, who are all lying in wait at Avalon's force nest.
26	"Re:Rise"	August 27, 2020
The Third Coalition of Volunteers fight Alus' forces, later joined by the BUILD DiVERS, while Cuadorn and Masaki stay behind at Eldora to destroy the Satellite Cannon's mainframe and prevent Alus from returning. Back in GBN, Hiroto attempts to form the Earthree Gundam but Alus steals the Earth Armor and equips it onto one of his own Gundams instead. In response, Hiroto equips his Core Gundam II with parts from the other armors at his disposal to fight back. Surprised by the Volunteers' fierce resistance, Alus launches an attack to take down GBN's systems, but is prevented when the Game Master and Miss Tori arrive to install a security patch and revert the damage. After his forces are almost destroyed by the Divers with more of them joining the battle, Alus launches one final desperate attack to destroy GBN, but is stopped by Sarah, May, and Eve's spirit before being ultimately defeated by Riku and Hiroto. After the battle, Alus's feelings reincarnate into a new infant EL-Diver that May takes in, during which, Hiroto discovers Eve's earring reincarnated as a pendant and was in May's possession all along, realizing some of Eve's lost data was also involved in May's creation. In a real-world meeting, Miss Tori points out that Alus' energy signature is similar to some issues that occurred in GBN during its development, implying that it was actually the Ancient Eldorans' last piece of dormant data entering the system, which could have been the final triggering factor that enabled the EL-Divers to be born in GBN. Some time later, Masaki is finally discharged from hospital, and the BUILD DiVERS, with Hinata as their newest member, return to Eldora to help the New Eldorans rebuild.

=== Original net animation ===
An original net animation (ONA) titled Gundam Build Divers Battlogue (Japanese: ガンダムビルドファイターズ バトローグ, Hepburn: Gandamu Birudo Daibāzu Batorōgu) premiered on Gundam Channel on November 13, 2020. Similar to the previous Battlogue series, the ONA features Gunpla battles based on fan votes including characters from both Build Divers and Build Divers Re:Rise. The ONA was directed by Masami Obari, and the rest of the staff from Gundam Build Divers Re:Rise returned to reprise their roles.

=== Manga ===
A spinoff manga titled Gundam Build Diver Rize (Japanese: ガンダムビルドダイバーリゼ, Hepburn: Gandamu Birudo Daibā Rize) began serialization in Kadokawa Shoten's monthly Gundam Ace Magazine in December 2019 and ended in March 2021. It was compiled into three volumes. Ryōji Sekinishi and Shiitake Gensui returned to write and illustrate the spinoff manga series with Takayuki Yanase providing the mecha designs.

=== Merchandise ===
Part of the series's merchandise was released under Bandai's long running Gunpla line of scale models and sub-collectible line such as Robot Spirits figures.

Preceded by SD Gundam World Sangoku Soketsuden	Gundam metaseries (production order); 2019–2020	Succeeded by Gundam Build Real
