= Gundam Build Metaverse =

Japanese anime series

ガンダムビルドメタバース (Gandamu Birudo Metabāzu)
- Genre: Mecha, Sports
- Created by: Hajime Yatate; Yoshiyuki Tomino
- Original net animation
- Directed by: Masami Ōbari
- Written by: Noboru Kimura
- Music by: Yuki Hayashi
- Studio: Sunrise Beyond
- Licensed by: NA: Sunrise
- Released: October 6, 2023 – October 20, 2023
- Episodes: 3

Gundam Build Metaverse (Japanese: ガンダムビルドメタバース, Hepburn: Gandamu Birudo Metabāzu) is a Japanese original net animation anime mini-series produced by Sunrise Beyond, and the fifth series within the Gundam Build Series sub-series. The series celebrates the 10th anniversary of the Gundam Build franchise, including characters from the previous installments.

== Plot ==
The story is set in the same universe of the Gundam Build series in an online metaverse space where users can use avatars to move around and interact with other users, including conducting Gunpla (Gundam plastic model) battles with them. The story centers on Rio Hōjō, a boy who lives in Hawaii, and who learns how to build Gunpla from a local hobbyist named Seria Urutsuki. In the metaverse, a figure known as Mask Lady teaches him the art of Gunpla battling, and he strives to get better at it every day. With his custom Lah Gundam, he seeks out ever stronger opponents.

== Characters ==
=== Main characters ===
Rio Hojo (ホウジョウ・リオ, Hōjō Rio)
Voiced by: Chika Anzai
A young boy from Hawaii who is an enthusiast of Gunpla Battle and is an apprentice of the mysterious Diver "Mask Lady". Rio's Gunpla is the Lah Gundam, modeled after an entry-grade RX-78-2 Gundam, from the original Mobile Suit Gundam anime series.
Seria Urutsuki (ウルツキ・セリア, Urutsuki Seria) / Mask Lady (マスクレディー, Masuku Reidi)
Voiced by: Rio Tsuchiya
A clerk at a local hobby shop and the instructor at their Gunpla class, Seria becomes Rio's Gunpla mentor using the alias "Mask Lady". Seria's Gunpla is the ZGMF-X20A-PF Gundam Perfect Strike Freedom Rouge, based on both the MBF-02 Strike Rouge and the GAT-X105+AQM/E-YM1 Perfect Strike Gundam from Mobile Suit Gundam Seed and the ZGMF-X20A Strike Freedom Gundam from Mobile Suit Gundam Seed Destiny.

=== Returning characters ===
Fumina Hoshino (ホシノ・フミナ, Hoshino Fumina)
Voiced by: Yui Makino
A veteran Gunpla Battler from the early days of the sport and the Leader of "Team Try Fighters", she works as an advertiser and announcer within the Metaverse realm.
Tatsuya Yuuki (ユウキ・タツヤ, Yūki Tatsuya) / Meijin Kawaguchi III (三代目メイジン・カワグチ, Sandaime Meijin Kawaguchi)
Voiced by: Takuya Satō
A builder and three-times Gunpla Battle world champion who inherited the name of the legendary Meijin Kawaguchi, known as "Meijin Kawaguchi III", and still the current title holder. His newest Gunpla is the Gundam Amazing Barbatos Lupus based on the ASW-G-08 Gundam Barbatos Lupus from Mobile Suit Gundam: Iron-Blooded Orphans.
Riku Mikami (ミカミ・リク, Mikami Riku) / Riku (リク)
Voiced by: Yūsuke Kobayashi
The Founder and former leader of the legendary force, "Build Divers". His Gunpla is the Gundam 00 Diver Arc, the latest version of the original GN-0000DVR Gundam 00 Diver from Gundam Build Divers, incorporating elements from the 00 Gundam from Mobile Suit Gundam 00 and the Gundam AGE-FX from Mobile Suit Gundam AGE.
Sarah (サラ, Sara)
Voiced by: Haruka Terui
An EL-Diver and member of the Build Divers.
Momoka Yashiro (ヤシロ・モモカ, Yashiro Momoka) / Momo (モモ)
Voiced by: Nene Hieda
Member of Build Divers. Her gunpla is the MOMOKAPOOL (R×R), an upgraded version of her PEN-01M Momokapool from Gundam Build Divers
Aya Fujisawa (フジサワ・アヤ, Fujisawa Aya) / Ayame (アヤメ)
Voiced by: Manami Numakura
Member of Build Divers. Her Gunpla is the F-Kunoichi Kai, an SD Gunpla based on the F91 Gundam F91 from Mobile Suit Gundam F91.
Sei Iori (イオリ・セイ, Iori Sei)
Voiced by: Mikako Komatsu
A builder and one time Gunpla Battle World Champion. His current Gunpla is the GAT-X105B/EG Build Strike Exceed Galaxy, the latest version of the original GAT-X105B Build Strike Gundam from Gundam Build Fighters.
Aria von Reiji Asuna (アリーア・フォン・レイジ・アスナ, Arīa fon Reiji Asuna)
Voiced by: Sachi Kokuryu
A prince from the country called Arian that exists within a space colony in another dimension, who became friends with Sei Iori and together won the Gunpla Battle World Championship. He somehow manages to log into the metaverse to reunite with his friend, piloting the SB-011 Star Burning Gundam.
Sekai Kamiki (カミキ・セカイ, Kamiki Sekai)
Voiced by: Kazumi Togashi
A veteran builder and former member of Team Try Fighters. He is currently the Japanese National representative Champion. In the series he develops a rivalry relationship with Hiroto similar to that of Kyoya and Rommel. His current Gunpla is the Shin Burning Gundam, the latest version of the original KMK-B01 Kamiki Burning Gundam from Gundam Build Fighters Try which is based on the Burning Gundam and Master Gundam.
Hiroto Kuga (クガ・ヒロト, Kuga Hiroto) / Hiroto (ヒロト, Hiroto)
Voiced by: Chiaki Kobayashi
A veteran diver, the one responsible for discovering more EL-Divers, and a former member of the legendary force "Avalon", who later joined the unofficial, "BUILD DiVERS" and eventually became the current Force Leader, and as well as the current title holder of "Hero of Gunpla". In the third episode he is the only Build Diver member who participates in the tournament, while his fellow force-mates are in the audience routing for him and Rio. His Gunpla is the Plutine Gundam, which is a combination of his Core Gundam II Plus, upgraded from the Core Gundam II featured in Gundam Build Divers Re:Rise equipped with the Pluto Armor.
Magee (マギー, Magī)
Voiced by: Taishi Murata
A flamboyant veteran Diver who owns a shop in the metaverse and is an acquaintance of Seria's.
Freddie (フレディ, Furedi)
Voiced by: Ai Kakuma
An alien anthropomorphic dog boy from planet Eldora, a support member to both Build Diver teams, who manages to access the metaverse from his home planet along his fellow Eldorans.
Ogre (オーガ, Ōga)
Voiced by: Wataru Hatano
Kyoya Kisugi (キスギ・キョウヤ, Kisugi Kyōya) / Kyoya Kujo (クジョウ・キョウヤ, Kujō Kyōya)
Voiced by: Jun Kasama
Leader of the legendary force "Avalon" and the reigning and current title holder of "World Champion". He along with Hiroto Kuga, Maria Urutsuki, and Tatsuya Yuuki are currently at the top of the entire gunpla world community. His current gunpla is an recolored version of his AGE-TRYMAG Gundam TRY AGE Magnum from Gundam Build Divers Re:Rise.
Susumu Sazaki (サザキ・ススム, Sazaki Susumu)
Voiced by: Ryo Hirohashi
Kaoruko Sazaki (サザキ・カオルコ, Sazaki Kaoruko)
Voiced by: Ryo Hirohashi
Mahiru Shigure (シグレ・マヒル, Shigure Mahiru)
Voiced by: Rinko Natsuhi
Keiko Sano (サノ・ケイコ, Sano Keiko)
Voiced by: Ami Naito

=== Others ===
Maria Urutsuki (ウルツキ・マリア, Urutsuki Maria) / Mascarilla (マスカリージャ, Masukarīja)
Voiced by: Ai Kakuma
A mysterious masked woman with a harsh rivalry with Seria and a similar avatar as hers, she is later revealed as Seria's younger sister Maria, who began to loathe her sister after she quit on their dream to fight for the title of Lady Kawaguchi. She later obtains the title, becoming "Lady Kawaguchi VII".
Jeff (ジェフさん, Jefu-san)
Voiced by: Kenta Miyake
A distant relative of Seria and Maria's and owner of the hobby shop where Seria lives.
Mellow Neige (メロウ・ネージュ, Merō Nēju)
Voiced by: Chikano Ibuki
A sentient A.I. who is the current publicity face of the Gunpla Metaverse.

== Episodes ==
| No. | Title | Directed by | Written by | Storyboarded by | Original release date |
|---|---|---|---|---|---|
| 1 | "Dive" | Masami Ōbari | Noboru Kimura | Yukihito Ōgomori, Masami Ōbari | October 6, 2023 |
Rio Hojo is a young boy who is enthusiastic about his Gunpla hobby, and with the help of his instructor Seria Urutsuki, he develops his own Gunpla dubbed Lah Gundam. Meanwhile, he hones his battle skills with his online mentor Mask Lady. Rio then decides to test his skills in the online game Gundam Metaverse, where he joins a team battle with Riku, Sarah, Ayame, and Momoka from the Build Divers. As Rio teams up with Riku against Ayame and Momoka, Mask Lady observes the battle with Sarah and Meijin Kawaguchi, who are both acquainted with her. Riku and Rio work together to win the battle, and Rio is shocked to find out that Riku and his friends are the real Build Divers. Later on, however, Mask Lady is defeated in battle by a woman who looks almost identical to her, who warns her not to return to Gundam Metaverse. Rio goes to help Mask Lady and is shocked to discover her real identity is Seria.
| 2 | "Re:Rise" | Masami Ōbari | Kazuho Hyōdō | Arata Ichijoji, Tetsuto Saito | October 20, 2023 |
Seria reveals to Rio that the woman was her younger sister Maria. The two once aimed to the title of Lady Kawaguchi, the strongest female builder, but the two had a fallout which led to Seria quitting Gunpla Battle at all until she met Rio and took him as her apprentice. Worried about her, Rio is approached by Magee, who invites him to participate in a Raid Battle. During the battle, Rio meets Hiroto and the two team up. Hiroto realizes that Rio is in a situation that is weighing on him and decides to give him a pep talk and shares with him the philosophy that Eve and Sarah brought into the Gunpla Battle Game space, just like he did with Parviz. With Rio's assistance, Hiroto equips his Core Gundam II Plus with the Pluto Armor and defeats the boss. Sekai Kamiki arrives after the battle and challenges the winner of the battle to a match, but Rio challenges him instead and is defeated. Back to Magee, Rio meets Seria who invites him to participate in the next event, where she expects to meet Maria again and settle their score once and for all.
| 3 | "TRY&FIGHT" | Masami Ōbari | Noboru Kimura | Toshihiko Masuda | October 20, 2023 |
Rio takes part in a massive Battle Royale event determined to confront Maria. All the members of the Build Divers other than Hiroto are in the audience to cheer Hiroto and Rio on, while Sarah, Magee, and Fumina sit with Seria in a private audience room to cheer Rio on for his upcoming battle with Maria. In the occasion Hiroto and Sekai have a duel while Tatsuya joins the event on a whim and ends up fighting Sei Iori. Sei later is joined by Reiji, who somehow manages to connect into the Metaverse all the way from his home dimension, Arian. During their fight, Rio manages to make Maria realize that despite her bitter past, she still loves Gunpla and her sister, and convinces her to give up on her hatred and reconcile with her. Some months later, Rio challenges Seria in the semi-finals of the Lotus Cup with numerous characters from the previous Gundam Build series in the audience, determined to finally win against his master and face Maria, who attained the title of Lady Kawaguchi VII, in the final.

| Preceded by Mobile Suit Gundam: The Witch from Mercury | Gundam metaseries (production order); 2023 | Succeeded by Mobile Suit Gundam SEED Freedom |
