= Sunrise Beyond =

Japanese animation studio

Sunrise Beyond Inc.
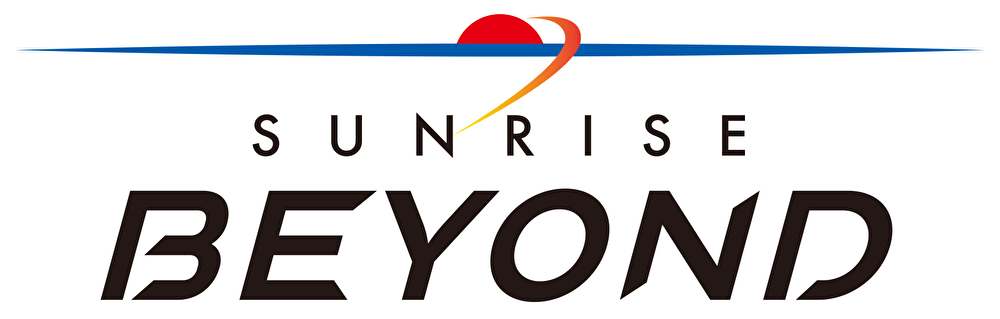

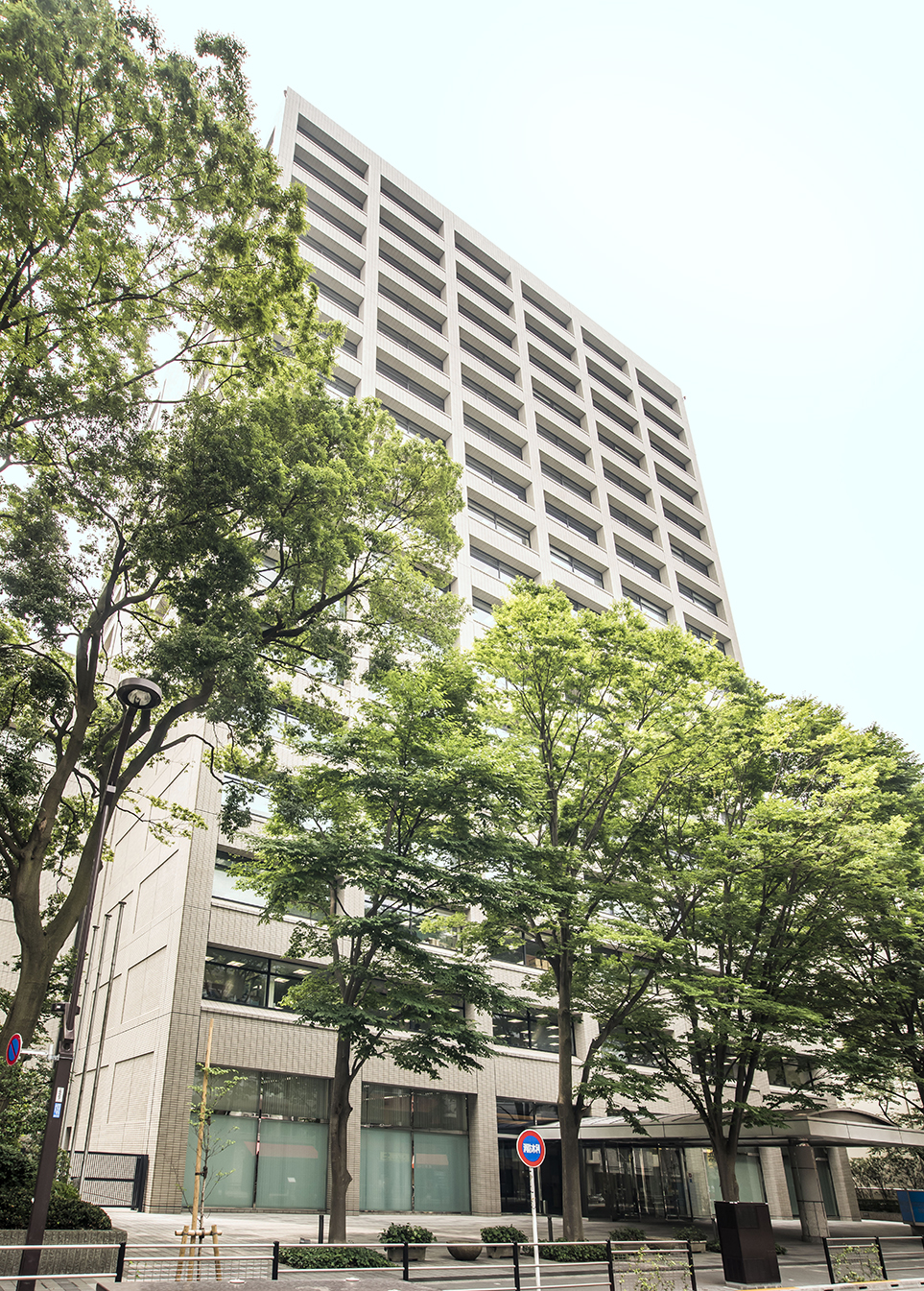
- Headquarters in Suginami, Tokyo
- Native name: 株式会社SUNRISE BEYOND
- Romanized name: Kabushiki-gaisha Sanraizu Biyondo
- Type: Subsidiary KK
- Industry: Japanese animation
- Predecessor: Xebec
- Founded: March 1, 2019; 7 years ago
- Defunct: April 1, 2024; 2 years ago
- Fate: Absorbed into Bandai Namco Filmworks
- Headquarters: Ogikubo, Suginami, Tokyo, Japan
- Key people: Masakazu Ogawa (president and CEO)
- Owner: Sunrise Inc. (2019-2022); Bandai Namco Filmworks (2022-2024)

Sunrise Beyond Inc. (Note: Japanese: 株式会社SUNRISE BEYOND, Hepburn: Kabushiki-gaisha Sanraizu Biyondo) (stylized in all caps) was a Japanese animation studio that was owned by Bandai Namco Filmworks. The company was established on March 1, 2019, in order to facilitate the transfer of several assets of Xebec, a subsidiary of IG Port due to the studio closing its doors that same year. After five years of operation, the studio was closed on April 1, 2024, with the company being absorbed into Bandai Namco Filmworks.

== History ==
On November 22, 2018, IG Port, citing a large deficit in operating the studio, announced that it would transfer the production operations of Xebec to Sunrise, a subsidiary of Bandai Namco Holdings. As part of the move, the companies would sign a letter of intent on March 11 of the following year after its establishment. On March 5 of the following year, Sunrise announced the company's establishment, which was done four days prior. Xebec zwei was not part of the transfer and was instead moved to Production I.G, renaming the division to I.G zwei. On January 9, 2024, after five years of operation, Bandai Namco Filmworks announced the dissolution of Sunrise Beyond, which took effect on April 1 of that year.

== Works ==
=== Television series ===
Title	Director(s)	First run start date	First run end date	Eps	Note(s)	Ref(s)
King's Raid: Successors of the Will	Makoto Hoshino	October 3, 2020	March 27, 2021	26	Based on the video game developer and published by Vespa. Co-produced with OLM.	
Amaim Warrior at the Borderline (part 1)	Nobuyoshi Habara	October 5, 2021	December 28, 2021	12	Original work.	
Mobile Suit Gundam: Iron-Blooded Orphans Special Edition	Tatsuyuki Nagai	April 4, 2022	May 31, 2022	9	Original work from parent studio Sunrise. Edited and condensed version of Mobile Suit Gundam: Iron-Blooded Orphans.	
Amaim Warrior at the Borderline (part 2)	Nobuyoshi Habara	April 12, 2022	June 28, 2022	12	Part two of Amaim Warrior at the Borderline.	
The Faraway Paladin: The Lord of Rust Mountain	Akira Inagawa	October 7, 2023	December 23, 2023	12	Season two of The Faraway Paladin. Based on the light novel series of the same name by Kanata Yanagino. Co-produced with OLM.	

=== OVAs/ONAs ===
Title	Director(s)	First run start date	First run end date	Eps	Note(s)	Ref(s)
Gundam Build Divers Re:Rise (season 1)	Shinya Watada	October 10, 2019	December 26, 2019	12	Original work. Sequel to Sunrise's Gundam Build Divers.	
Gundam Build Divers Re:Rise (season 2)	Shinya Watada	October 10, 2019	December 26, 2019	12	Second season of Gundam Build Divers Re:Rise	
Amaim Warrior at the Borderline: UltraSteel Ogre-Gear	Masami Ōbari	August 10, 2023	October 19, 2023	6	Original work. Sequel to Amaim Warrior at the Borderline.	
