= Fumito Iwai =

- Born: December 24, 1990 (age 35); Eniwa, Hokkaido, Japan
- Origin: Japan
- Genres: Rock, pop
- Occupations: Singer, songwriter, guitarist
- Instruments: Vocals, guitar
- Years active: 2009–present

Fumito Iwai (岩井郁人, Iwai Fumito; born December 24, 1990), is a Japanese musician. Debuting as a member of the Hokkaido rock band Galileo Galilei in 2009, he left to form a new musical unit, Folks.

== Biography ==
Iwai was born in Eniwa, Hokkaido in 1990. In junior high school, he and his friends formed a band called Guild in 2007. The group performed at rock events in Sapporo from 2007 onwards, and self-produced an extended play, Shinzō (心臓; "Heart"), in August 2008, followed by a self-released single called "Tsubasa" (ツバサ; "Wings") in February 2009. The band entered the School of Lock! national teenage rock contest, Senkō Riot, in 2008, and performed at the round three Sapporo semi-finals. The band did not make it to the national finals, but met the semi-final winner, Galileo Galilei.

In 2009 after Folks went on hiatus, Galileo Galilei vocalist Yuuki Ozaki told Iwai to come to Wakkanai, Hokkaido, where Galileo Galilei members were going to high school, as their guitarist, Sōhei Funaya, had left. Iwai accepted, and lived at the house of band's bassist, Hitoshi Sakō. Iwai joined the band on August 31, 2009 as a support member. Galileo Galilei made their major debut with SME Records in 2010, moving to Tokyo. Their debut full-length album, Parade, reached number five on Oricon's album charts. In March 2011, the band relocated to Sapporo, and the bandmates started living together, calling their home Galileo House. In Galileo Galilei, Ozaki was the main lyricist songwriter, and would give ideas to Iwai and other band members to work on further. Iwai did not feel confident in his ideas and lyrics, however wrote the music for their 2011 single "Asu e", and worked on many of the songs on Portal (2012), including most of the work on the instrumental song "Blue River Side Alone". Iwai started to feel like he wanted to influence the Japanese music scene more by himself, and in July 2012, during the demo sessions for Baby, It's Cold Outside, told Ozaki that he wanted to be the front man of his own band. On September 13, 2012, it was officially announced that Iwai would leave the band with fellow member Kazumasa Noguchi, so that Iwai could challenge himself with something new musically.

In 2012, Iwai and Noguchi returned to Hokkaido to set up their own band, and asked former Guild member Yoshitomo Kobayashi to join. They moved to Sapporo to further their music career, and rented a house with Iwai's older brother Katsutoshi Iwai. Iwai and Masatsugu Takahashi had a separate band at the same time, and after realising that both groups would work well together, the two bands merged in January 2013, forming Folks and basing themselves at the Iwai household in Megumino.

The group released their first extended play, Take Off, digitally on March 29, 2013, and made their major label debut under Ki/oon Music in 2014 with the extended play Newtown.

== Songwriting discography ==
- 2011: "Asu e" (Galileo Galilei) (music)
- 2012: "Blue River Side Alone" (Galileo Galilei) (music)
- 2013: "Replica" (Folks) (lyrics and music)
- 2013: "Forever" (Folks) (lyrics and music)
- 2013: "You're Right" (i.e. "Gaga") (lyrics and music)
- 2014: "Everything Is Alone" (Folks) (lyrics and music)
- 2014: "Two Young" (Folks) (lyrics and music)
- 2014: "Good-bye, Friends" (Folks) (lyrics and music)
- 2014: "Hometown Story" (Folks) (lyrics and music)
- 2014: "Paradise" (Folks) (lyrics and music)
