= Folks (band) =

Japanese rock band

- Origin: Eniwa, Hokkaido
- Genres: Indie rock, indie pop, shoegazing, electropop
- Years active: 2012-present
- Labels: Ki/oon Music
- Members: Fumito Iwai; Kazumasa Noguchi; Katsutoshi Iwai; Masatsugu Takahashi; Yoshitomo Kobayashi
- Website: folks-eniwa.com

Folks (Japanese: フォークス, Hepburn: Fōkusu; stylised as FOLKS) is a Japanese rock band that formed in 2012 in Eniwa, Hokkaido. It was formed after members Fumito Iwai and Kazumasa Noguchi left the band Galileo Galilei. The band self-released their first extended play, Take Off, in March 2013, and made their major label debut under Ki/oon Music in 2014 with the extended play Newtown.

The band consists of Fumito Iwai (岩井郁人) (vocals, guitar), his older brother Katsutoshi Iwai (岩井豪利) (guitar, vocals), Kazumasa Noguchi (野口一雅) (bass, chorus), Yoshitomo Kobayashi (小林禄与) (guitar, percussion, synthesisers, chorus) and Masatsugu Takahashi (高橋正嗣) (programming, synthesisers, chorus).

== Biography ==
=== Guild, work with Galileo Galilei ===
Folks evolved from an earlier band called Guild that formed in Eniwa, Hokkaido in 2007. From 2007 to 2008 the band was initially known as Apple Seed, a name they took from the Appleseed manga. The band was renamed The Guild in 2008, and simply as Guild from mid 2009. The band consisted of classmates Fumito Iwai (guitar, vocals and songwriter), Kazumasa Noguchi (bass), Fumiya Kamo (加茂史也) (drums), and later Yoshitomo Kobayashi was added as a guitarist in 2009.

The group performed at rock events in Sapporo from 2007 onwards, and self-produced an extended play, Shinzō (心臓; "Heart"), in August 2008, followed by a self-released single called "Tsubasa" (ツバサ; "Wings") in February 2009. The band entered the School of Lock! national teenage rock contest, Senkō Riot, in 2008, and performed at the round three Sapporo semi-finals. The band did not make it to the national finals, but met the semi-final winner, Galileo Galilei. Iwai wanted Guild to have a sound like Galileo Galilei, and began exchanging emails with the band. Galileo Galilei eventually won the grand prize at the national finals.

In 2009, band activities continued, and Guild competed in Senkō Riot a second time. At the time, Iwai was unemployed, and wanted to do focus more on band activities. However Kamo and Kobayashi were going to university and Noguchi started attending a music vocational school. Galileo Galilei vocalist Yuuki Ozaki told Iwai to come to Wakkanai, Hokkaido, where Galileo Galilei members were going to high school, as their guitarist, Sōhei Funaya, had left. Iwai accepted, and lived at the house of band's bassist, Hitoshi Sakō. Iwai joined the band on August 31, 2009, as a support member. Guild announced a hiatus in November 2009, and Iwai became an official band member.

Galileo Galilei made their major debut with SME Records in 2010, moving to Tokyo. Their debut full-length album, Parade, reached number five on Oricon's album charts. In March 2011, the band relocated to Sapporo, and the bandmates started living together, calling their home Galileo House (ガリレオ・ハウス). Noguchi from Guild also started living with the band. Noguchi helped the band in the studio and at lives, and became an official member on December 13, 2011, as a keyboardist and synthesiser user, before the release of their second album Portal. Noguchi, originally a bass player, found it difficult to get better at using synthesisers.

In Galileo Galilei, Yuuki Ozaki was the main lyricist songwriter, and would give ideas to Iwai and other band members to work on further. Iwai did not feel confident in his ideas and lyrics, however wrote the music for their 2011 single "Asu e", and worked on many of the songs on Portal (2012), including most of the work on the instrumental song "Blue River Side Alone". Iwai started to feel like he wanted to influence the Japanese music scene more by himself, and in July 2012, during the demo sessions for Baby, It's Cold Outside, told Ozaki that he wanted to be the front man of his own band.

On September 13, 2012, it was officially announced that Iwai and Noguchi would leave the band, so that Iwai could challenge himself with something new musically, and so that Noguchi could work as a bassist.

=== Return to Hokkaido, formation ===
In 2012, Iwai and Noguchi returned to Hokkaido to set up their own band, and asked former Guild member Yoshitomo Kobayashi to join. They moved to Sapporo to further their music career, and rented a house with Iwai's older brother Katsutoshi Iwai and his friend Masatsugu Takahashi, who also had a separate band called Logic. All five people practised music in their own rooms, but because Katsutoshi Iwai's room was a Japanese style room, the other band members could hear him through the thin shōji walls. Originally Fumito Iwai thought that they would not work well together musically with Katsutoshi Iwai and Takahashi, since they both enjoyed 1990s British rock and grunge. However, in late 2012, Fumito Iwai heard his brother composing the song "River", and enjoyed it so much he asked to arrange the song. On New Years Day, Fumito Iwai unveiled his completed arrangement for the song, which all the housemates loved. Takahashi suggested they merge their two bands to create a five-member band, which lead to the formation of Folks.

The name Folks was chosen to represent the band being a community of creators, where all members take part in song production. It was originally a name that Katsutoshi Iwai and Takahashi had come up with for a band they wanted to create, before being asked to join Folks. The band was officially formed in January 2013, and based themselves at the Iwai household in Megumino. They recorded songs in Fumito Iwai's bedroom, and self-released their first extended play, Take Off, digitally on March 29, 2013. Their first live was held at Sapporo Sound Lab Mole on April 6, 2013. The band made their first festival performance, at the Rising Sun Rock Festival, on August 17, 2013.

In late 2013, Folks were signed to Ki/oon Music, and will make their major label debut in 2014 with the extended play Newtown. The release has a Megumino motif, and the leading track "Everything Is Alone" was shot in Eniwa by Yoshiharu Ota. They performed their first live outside of Hokkaido at the Tokyo Tsutaya O-West on January 20, 2014. Folks made a decision to continue to base themselves in Eniwa, instead of moving to Tokyo.

== Artistry ==
For the band's first extended play, Take Off (2013), Fumito Iwai worked on the songwriting and arrangement all by himself, with little input from other band members. One song from the release, "River", was written and sung by his brother, Katsutoshi Iwai. Fumito Iwai wanted to create a community of creators, so encouraged all members of the band to learn how to produce songs. Not all members could write music when Folks first formed in 2013, but learnt to after months of sharing ideas. After seeing the reaction to live versions of the songs from Take Off performed live at concerts, and after the band's members became more confident in songwriting and music software, all the members of Folks began suggesting ideas. By their second release, Newtown (2014), the band members felt like the album was created by everybody, and was less of a solo project for Fumito Iwai.

Fumito Iwai considers the songs' arrangements to be the central part of the songs Folks create. Take Off was created, arranged and mixed by Fumito Iwai alone, using Logic Pro software. Folks' sound has been influenced by Oasis, and English indie rock musicians such as James Blake and Bombay Bicycle Club. Iwai feels influenced by Yuuki Ozaki's lyrical style, and by Galileo Galilei's music after spending two years living with the members. For Newtown, the band felt most influenced by French indie rock band Phoenix's album Wolfgang Amadeus Phoenix (2009).

Reviewer Akihiro Okumura from What's In? was impressed with the "overseas resonance" of the band, likening Folks to indie rock musicians like Passion Pit and Mumford and Sons, as well as having the "dubstep approach" of James Blake. Okumura felt Folks' vocals were like the 1980s city pop movement in Japanese music. Saori Kishiba, a reviewer for Skream!, likened the band to Animal Collective and Arcade Fire, praising the band's "dreamy pop sound" and polished arrangements of songs.

In March 2015, Folks' extended play Newtown was awarded the best Hokkaido-region artist award at the 7th CD Shop Awards.

== Discography ==
=== Extended plays ===
List of extended plays, with selected chart positions
Title	Album details	Peak positions	
Title	Album details	Oricon Weekly	Billboard Japan
Take Off	Self-produced; Released: March 29, 2013; Formats: CD, digital download	—	—
Newtown	Released: February 12, 2014; Label: Ki/oon Music; Formats: CD, digital download	81	87
Snowtown	Released: February 25, 2015; Label: Ki/oon; Formats: CD, digital download	267	TBA

=== Singles ===
List of singles, with selected chart positions
Title	Year	Peak chart positions		Album
Title	Year	Oricon Singles Charts	Billboard Japan Hot 100	Album
"Hometown Story"	2014	—	—	Non-album single

=== Promotional singles ===
Title	Year	Peak chart positions	Album
Title	Year	Billboard Japan Hot 100	Album
"Everything Is Alone"	2014	— (Note: Charted at number 81 on the Billboard Adult Contemporary Airplay Chart.)	Newtown
"Fuyu no Himawari" (冬の向日葵; "Winter Sunflower")	2014	—	Snowtown
