= Hometown Story (song) =

- Standard and digital download editions' cover.

Single by Folks
- B-side: "Frenemy"; "Paradise"
- Released: September 3, 2014
- Recorded: 2014
- Genre: Pop rock, electropop
- Length: 4:27
- Label: Ki/oon Music
- Songwriter: Fumito Iwai
- Producer: Folks

Folks singles chronology
"Everything Is Alone" (2014)	"Hometown Story" (2014)

"Hometown Story" (stylised as "HOMETOWN STORY") is a song by Japanese band Folks. It was released as their first physical single on September 3, 2014, seven months after their major label debut extended play Newtown under Ki/oon Music.

== Background and development ==
Folks first formed in 2013 when former Galileo Galilei members Fumito Iwai and Kazumasa Noguchi moved back to their birthplace of Hokkaido to start a band. Iwai and Noguchi asked former Guild member Yoshitomo Kobayashi to join their band, and they moved to Sapporo, renting a house with Iwai's older brother Katsutoshi Iwai and his friend Masatsugu Takahashi, who later joined Folks. The group based themselves at their hometown of Eniwa, Hokkaido, and released their first extended play Take Off in March 2013, and performed at the Rising Sun Rock Festival, on August 17, 2013. In February 2014, they made their major label debut with Ki/oon Music.

After the release of Newtown, the band members moved into the same house in Eniwa, Hokkaido in March, which created new opportunities for songwriting. During this period, Folks began a series of musical events called Camp Fire, which showcases live performances of bands including Folks. The first event was held on May 31, 2014, in Sapporo. The band played at several major summer festivals in 2014, including Rock in Japan Festival in Ibaraki, Summer Sonic in Tokyo and Rising Sun in Hokkaido.

== Writing and production ==
After recording Newtown, the band found that they did not have any songs left in their stock, so spent February writing 30 new compositions over two weeks. Three of these songs became the songs featured on the single. "Hometown Story" and "Paradise" were written by Fumito Iwai, and "Frenemy" primarily by Masatsugu Takahashi and Katsutoshi Iwai. Fumito Iwai sings the vocals on "Hometown Story" and "Paradise", while Katsutoshi Iwai sings the lead vocals on "Frenemy". The songs were recorded as demos at the band's new house in Eniwa, before being recorded in studio.

"Hometown Story" was inspired by friendship, as well as their hometown of Eniwa. While writing the song, Fumito Iwai thought more about how catchy melodies and sampled vocal sounds were for a wider audience than on Newtown. The subject matter was inspired by band members Kobayashi and Noguchi, who both lived in the same danchi when they were young.

"Frenemy" was created with very little input by Fumito Iwai, instead created by the other band members. The title was inspired by overseas dramas that Takahashi was watching at the time.

== Promotion and release ==
The song was released as a physical single on September 3, 2014. The CD came with a special photobook that detailed the band members' daily lives in Eniwa, shot by Yoshiharu Ota, who had also shot the booklet for Newtown and the video for "Everything Is Alone". To promote the release, Folks appeared in issues of Musica and Rockin' On Japan magazines, as well as making radio broadcasts at FM North Wave and Air'G. On September 9, Folks broadcast their first Ustream concert, live from their home studio in Eniwa.

A music video was produced for the song, which was released on the same day as the single's release. It was directed by Shinpei Uno of Video Camp, and was shot in Eniwa over the course of three days. The video made use of a camera attached to a radio-controlled helicopter to take aerial scenes of Eniwa.

Folks will perform their second Camp Fire event in Sapporo on September 20, alongside bands Asobius and You Said Something. In December, they will extend Camp Fire to have concerts in Osaka and Tokyo, as well as holding their first solo concert on December 23 in Sapporo.

== Critical reception ==
Saori Yoshiba of Skream! praised the single, calling it a "densely fantasy" "dreamy world of sound". She noted the "cynical synths", "rock 'n' roll hook" and "'80s pop essence" which managed to blend together seamlessly. Atsutake Kaneko of What's In? called "Hometown Story" "up-tempo with a sparkling clear-toned electro production, fused with a folky melody that can make you feel the spread of the continents", and praised the "grunge/alterna base" with additional electronic aspects in "Frenemy". He felt that "Paradise" had a Motown sound, and that the three songs taken together were like an omnibus film, showing different aspects of a hometown.

== Track listing ==
No.	Title	Writer(s)	Length
1.	"Hometown Story"	Fumito Iwai	4:27
2.	"Frenemy"	Masatsugu Takahashi, Katsutoshi Iwai, F. Iwai	3:55
3.	"Paradise" (パラダイス Paradaisu)	F. Iwai	2:58
Total length:			11:20

== Personnel ==
Personnel details were sourced from "Hometown Story"'s liner notes booklet.

Folks

- All members – arrangement, production
- Fumito Iwai – arrangement (#1, #3), guitar, lyrics (#1, #3), music (#1–3), vocals (#1, #3)
- Katsutoshi Iwai – arrangement (#2), guitar, lyrics (#2), music (#2), vocals (#2)
- Yoshitomo Kobayashi – guitar, synthesizer, percussion, chorus
- Kazumasa Noguchi – arrangement (#2), bass, chorus, synthesizer bass
- Masatsugu Takahashi – chorus, lyrics (#2), programming, synthesizer

Musicians, personnel and imagery

- Ayaka Kimura – hair, make-up
- Momo Kobayashi (from Lemchap) – chorus (#3)
- Tatsuki Masuko – mixing, mastering
- Masayo Morikawa – stylist
- Yoshiharu Ota – art direction, photography
- Hirano Tanaka – art direction, design
- Naoya Tsubakihara – support drum, drum technician
- Hirokazu Tsuruha – recording engineer at Hit Studio

== Release history ==
Region	Date	Format	Distributing Label	Catalogue codes
Japan	September 3, 2014	CD, digital download	Ki/oon Music	KSCL-2471, KSCL-2472
Japan	September 20, 2014	Rental CD	Ki/oon Music	KSCL-2471, KSCL-2472
