= Kengo Kawanishi =

Japanese voice actor (born 1985)

- 河西健吾
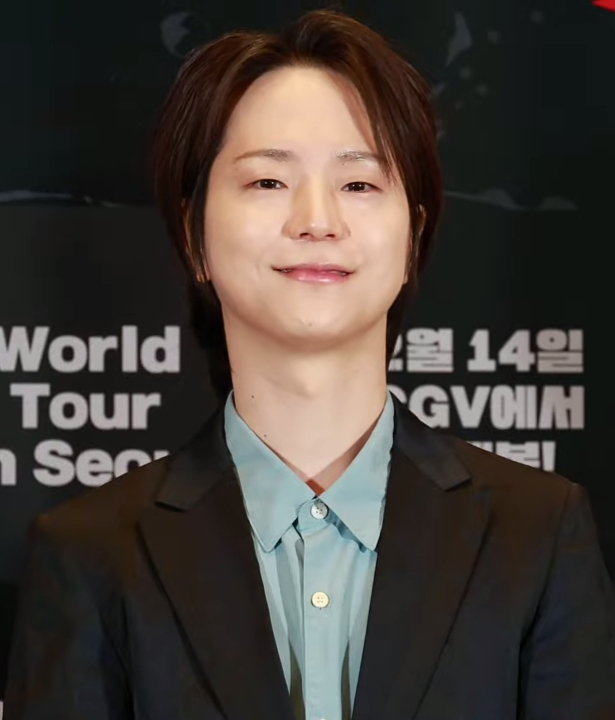
- Kawanishi in February 2024
- Born: February 18, 1985 (age 41); Osaka Prefecture, Japan
- Occupation: Voice actor
- Years active: 2006–present
- Agent: Mausu Promotion

Kengo Kawanishi (河西健吾, Kawanishi Kengo; born February 18, 1985) is a Japanese voice actor. He was formerly affiliated with Office Kaoru, but is now represented by Mausu Promotion.

== Filmography ==
=== Anime series ===
Year	Title	Role	Ref.
2006	Atashin'chi	Costumer D	
2006	Angel Heart	children	
2006	Kanon	Audience	
2006	Doraemon		
2009	Saki	Referee	
2010	Sazae-san		
2010	Naruto: Shippuden	Gentleman Cat, Townspeople, Foreign traveler	
2010	Hakuōki	Aizu Samurai	
2010	Asobi ni Iku yo!	Reporter	
2011	A Dark Rabbit Has Seven Lives	Student	
2011	Naruto: Shippuden	Kagami Uchiha, Sagiri (ep 235), Chunin, Researcher, Friend, Kage	
2011	Beelzebub	Kōsei Kuroki (Kagegumi), Referee (ep 35)	
2011	Blood-C	Schoolboy	
2011	Gintama	Otaku A	
2011	Deadman Wonderland	Matayoshi	
2011	Gosick	Italian boy, Child soldier	
2012	World War Blue	Myomuto	
2012	Naruto: Shippuden	Konoha Shinobi, Kumogakure Shinobi, Shinobi, Samurai, Zaji	
2012	Accel World	Avatar C	
2012	Another	Junta Nakao	
2012	Inu x Boku SS	Boy 2 (ep 6)	
2012	Phi Brain: Puzzle of God Season 2	Man	
2012	Beelzebub	Hasui (ep 54), Quetzalcoatl	
2013	Star Blazers: Space Battleship Yamato 2199	Mitsuru Yoshida	
2013	Inazuma Eleven GO: Galaxy	Kazerma Woorg	
2013	Naruto: Shippuden	Shū (eps 309–310), Edo tensei Shinobi, Shinobi Union, Naka Uchiha	
2013	Sunday Without God	Hardy (eps 7–8), Questine (eps 10–12), Student	
2013	Golden Time	Male student	
2013	Nagi-Asu: A Lull in the Sea	Gaku Egawa	
2013	Samurai Flamenco	Man B, Male student C (ep 4)	
2013	Stella Women's Academy, High School Division Class C3	Enemy C (ep 3)	
2013	Strike the Blood	Caster (ep 3), Driver (ep 2), Iron Guard (ep 7)	
2013	Ace of Diamond: Second Season	Wataru Kariba, Yoshimi Hidokoro, Narushima Junior High School team	
2013	Little Busters! Refrain	Student D (ep 8)	
2014	Golden Time	Kazuya	
2014	Nobunaga the Fool	Domrémy Village Child A (ep 15)	
2014	World Conquest Zvezda Plot	"Big Bro" smoker (ep 3), Capital guard B (ep 11)	
2014	No Game No Life	Populace	
2014	Samurai Flamenco	Operator	
2014	Haikyu!!	Shigeru Yahaba, Kitagawa Daiichi member A (ep 1), Other school's player (ep 16), Other school's student (eps 20, 23), Other school's volleyball club (ep 22)	
2014	Aldnoah.Zero	Kisaki Matsuribi	
2014	Monthly Girls' Nozaki-kun	Male student (ep 1)	
2014	Bladedance of Elementalers	Audience (ep 4)	
2014	Naruto: Shippuden	Shinobi of Kirigakure, Konohagakure villager, Konoha Anbu, Kakashi's student, Tobirama Senju (young)	
2014	In Search of the Lost Future	Yoshida	
2014	Noragami	Student D	
2014	Psycho-Pass 2	Kyohei Otsu	
2015	Aldnoah Zero Part 2	Kisaki Matsuribi	
2015	Naruto: Shippuden	Academy student (eps 418–419), Friend (ep 415), Mikoshi	
2015	JoJo's Bizarre Adventure: Stardust Crusaders	Manga Artist (ep 26); Tatsuhiko Doll (ep 40)	
2015	Ace of Diamond: Second Season	Seki Naomichi, Wataru Kariba	
2015	Hello!! Kin-iro Mosaic	Schoolboy, Teacher B	
2015	Seraph of the End	Vampire	
2015	Yamada-kun and the Seven Witches	Urara Fan B (ep 1)	
2015	Sound! Euphonium	Concert band member (ep 5)	
2015	My Love Story!!	Three sets male student A	
2015	The Heroic Legend of Arslan	Asim (eps 1–2)	
2015	Food Wars!: Shokugeki no Soma	Shōji Satō, Male student B (ep 17), Male student E (ep 3), Schoolboy B (eps 1, 14)	
2015	Shimoneta: A Boring World Where the Concept of Dirty Jokes Doesn't Exist	Youth B, Zendo-ka Division member B, Disciplinarian B, Man A, Gathered Fabric man, Operator	
2015	Knights of Sidonia: Battle for Planet Nine	Mechanic (ep 10)	
2015	To Love Ru Darkness 2nd	Pirate C	
2015	Charlotte	Shichino	
2015	Rokka: Braves of the Six Flowers	Soldier A (ep 3)	
2015	Gate: Jieitai Kano Chi nite, Kaku Tatakaeri	Adolescent, Nicola, Personnel, Clerk, Saver, Roger	
2015	The Asterisk War	Male student B (ep 1)	
2015	Chivalry of a Failed Knight	Student (ep 1), Security guard (ep 3)	
2015	Mobile Suit Gundam: Iron-Blooded Orphans	Mikazuki Augus	
2016	Prince of Stride: Alternative	Aoi Shima, Arata Samejima	
2016	Naruto: Shippuden	Shisui Uchiha (young)	
2016	Active Raid 2nd	Sosuke Torigoe, Taiga Nawa	
2016	March Comes In like a Lion	Rei Kiriyama	
2016	The Disastrous Life of Saiki K.	Kenji Tanihara	
2016	Bungo Stray Dogs	John Steinbeck	
2016	All Out!!	Shōta Adachigahara	
2016	JoJo's Bizarre Adventure: Diamond Is Unbreakable	Terunosuke Miyamoto	
2016	Luck & Logic	Ferio	
2017	Akiba's Trip: The Animation	Shōhei	
2017	Atom: The Beginning	Kensaku Han	
2017	Chronos Ruler	Bill Raidan	
2017	Dive!!	Jirō Hirayama	
2017	The Idolmaster SideM	Ken Yamamura	
2017	Kabukibu!	Jin Ebihara	
2017	March Comes In like a Lion 2nd Season	Rei Kiriyama	
2017	Naruto: Shippuden	Yurito	
2017	Saga of Tanya the Evil	Johann	
2017	Sagrada Reset	Chiruchiru	
2018	Hinamatsuri	Sabu	
2018	Doreiku	Gekkō Itabashi	
2018	Run with the Wind	Kosuke Sakaki	
2018	Jingai-san no Yome	Sora Hikurakawa	
2018	Kitsune no Koe	Hu Li	
2019	That Time I Got Reincarnated as a Slime	Gelmud	
2019	Ultramarine Magmell	Inyō	
2019	Over Drive Girl 1/6	Seijirō Kanmuri	
2019	Dr. Stone	Gen	
2019	Fire Force	Tōru Kishiri	
2019	Fruits Basket	Ritsu Soma	
2019	Demon Slayer: Kimetsu no Yaiba	Muichirō Tokitō	
2019	Cautious Hero: The Hero Is Overpowered but Overly Cautious	Mash	
2019	African Office Worker	Honeyguide	
2019	Stars Align	Kazumi Miwa	
2020	number24	Natsusa Yuzuki	
2020	Interspecies Reviewers	Narugami	
2020	A Certain Scientific Railgun T	Gunha Sogīta	
2020	Re:Zero − Starting Life in Another World	Lye Batenkaitos	
2020	King's Raid: Successors of the Will	Roi	
2020	The Gymnastics Samurai	Hiro Okamachi	
2020	Wandering Witch: The Journey of Elaina	Chara	
2020	Boruto	Yurito	
2021	Log Horizon: Destruction of the Round Table	Tōri	
2021	Dr. Stone: Stone Wars	Gen	
2021	Mushoku Tensei: Jobless Reincarnation	Arumanfi	
2021	Tokyo Revengers	Nahoya Kawata	
2021	Scarlet Nexus	Shiden Ritter	
2021	The Case Study of Vanitas	Roland Fortis	
2021	Blue Period	Haruka Hashida	
2022	The Genius Prince's Guide to Raising a Nation Out of Debt	Manfred	
2022	Skeleton Knight in Another World	Sekt	
2022	Yu-Gi-Oh! Go Rush!!	Teru Kawai	
2022	Chainsaw Man	Yutaro Kurose	
2023	Kubo Won't Let Me Be Invisible	Junta Shiraishi	
2023	Blue Lock	Eita Otoya	
2023	Demon Slayer: Kimetsu no Yaiba – Swordsmith Village Arc	Muichirō Tokitō, Yuichirō Tokitō	
2023	My Clueless First Friend	Daichi Hino	
2023	Mashle	Anser Shinri	
2023	Captain Tsubasa: Junior Youth Arc	Elle Sid Pierre	
2023	Overtake!	Satsuki Harunaga	
2023	Migi & Dali	Eiji Ichijō	
2023	Tokyo Revengers: Tenjiku Arc	Sōya Kawata	
2023	Hypnosis Mic: Division Rap Battle: Rhyme Anima+	Rosho Tsutsujimori	
2024	Oblivion Battery	Shuto Kirishima	
2024	Wind Breaker	Taiga Tsugeura	
2024	Yatagarasu: The Raven Does Not Choose Its Master	Atsufusa	
2024	Kaiju No. 8	Soshiro Hoshina	
2024	Tower of God 2nd Season	Prince	
2024	Wistoria: Wand and Sword	Ignor Lindor	
2024	Blue Miburo	Yamanami Keisuke	
2024	Acro Trip	Mashirou	
2024	Blue Box	Shoichiro Kishi	
2025	Headhunted to Another World	Viper Lordpent	
2025	Kowloon Generic Romance	Yūlong	
2025	Detectives These Days Are Crazy!	Tarō Nezu	
2025	Ninja vs. Gokudo	Order	
2026	Noble Reincarnation: Born Blessed, So I'll Obtain Ultimate Power	Oscar Ararat	
2026	Snowball Earth	Nayuta Izumi	
2026	The Exiled Heavy Knight Knows How to Game the System	Carlos	

=== Original net animation ===
Year	Title	Role	Ref.
2015	Monster Strike	Akira Kagetsuki	
2023	Yakitori: Soldiers of Misfortune	Erland Martonen	

=== Original video animation ===
Year	Title	Role	Ref.
2014	Ace of Diamond	Baba	

=== Anime films ===
Year	Title	Role	Ref.
2012	Naruto the Movie: Blood Prison	Muku (young)	
2013	Puella Magi Madoka Magica the Movie: Rebellion	Male student	
2015	Boruto: Naruto the Movie	Yurui	
2015	The Anthem of the Heart	Kazuharu Yamaji	
2018	Batman Ninja	Red Robin	
2020	Josee, the Tiger and the Fish	Yukichi	
2022	Blue Thermal	Kaede Hatori	
2024	Dead Dead Demon's Dededede Destruction	Tarō Miura	
2024	Zegapain STA	Hal Velt	
2025	Hypnosis Microphone - D.R.B.- The Movie	Rosho Tsutsujimori	
2025	Batman Ninja vs. Yakuza League	Red Robin	
2025	Demon Slayer: Kimetsu no Yaiba – The Movie: Infinity Castle	Muichiro Tokito	
2026	Killtube	Kikuchiyo	

=== Drama CD ===
Year	Title	Role	Ref.
2014	Like a Butterfly	Male student	
2015	Neko to Watashi no Kin'yōbi	Kanade Maidō	

=== Video games ===
Year	Title	Role	Ref.
2012	Lord of Sorcery	Fin	
2014	Haikyu!! Tsunage! Itadaki no keshiki!!	Shigeru Yahaba	
2014	The Evil Within	Leslie Withers	
2015	Prince of Stride	Aoi Shima, Arata Samejima	
2015	Fire Emblem Fates	Prince Siegbert	
2015	Mobile Suit Gundam: Extreme VS Force	Mikazuki Augus	
2016	Akai Suna Ochiru Tsuki	Shiro Ebisu	
2016	Mobile Suit Gundam: Extreme VS Maxi Boost ON	Mikazuki Augus	
2016	Onmyōji	Shishio	
2017	Akane-sasu Sekai de Kimi to Utau	Fujiwara no Michinaga	
2017	Sengoku Night Blood	Takakage Kobayakawa	
2018	King's Raid	Roi	
2018	Touken Ranbu	Nansen Ichimonji	
2018	Onmyōji Arena	Shishio	
2019	Edge of Awakening	Izuna	
2019	Fate/Grand Order	Scandinavia Peperoncino	
2019	Fire Emblem: Three Houses	Cyril	
2019	Another Eden	Dunarith	
2019	Hero's Park	Kino Yuuki	
2019	Eternal City	Izakku/Isaac	
2020	Arknights	Adnachiel, Noir Corne	
2020	The King of Fighters for Girls	Sie Kensou	
2020	Nioh 2	Abe no Seimei	
2021	A Certain Magical Index: Imaginary Fest	Gunha Sogīta	
2022	Atelier Sophie 2: The Alchemist of the Mysterious Dream	Diebold Lewerenz	
2022	Fate/Grand Order	Taisui Xingjun	
2022	SD Gundam Battle Alliance	Mikazuki Augus	
2023	Fate/Samurai Remnant	Miyamoto Iori	
2024	Honkai Star Rail	Aventurine	
2024	Ride Kamens	Narushi Kamui/Kamen Rider Kamui	
2025	Zenless Zone Zero	Youkai	
2026	Dark Auction	Noah Crawford	
2026	Wuthering Waves	Jingran	

=== Dubbing ===
==== Live-action ====
Title	Role	Dubbing Actor	Ref.
Boy Erased	Jared Eamons	Lucas Hedges	
Manchester by the Sea	Patrick Chandler	Lucas Hedges	
The Zero Theorem	Bob	Lucas Hedges	
American Gods	Technical Boy	Bruce Langley	
Body Cam	Danny Holledge	Nat Wolff	
The Book Thief	Rudy Steiner	Nico Liersch	
The D Train	Zach Landsman	Russell Posner	
Dessau Dancers	Michel	Sebastian Jaeger	
Harry Potter and the Half-Blood Prince	Blaise Zabini	Louis Cordice	
Harry Potter and the Deathly Hallows – Part 2	Blaise Zabini	Louis Cordice	
Into the Storm	Trey Fuller	Nathan Kress	
It Follows	Paul	Keir Gilchrist	
Stealing Cars	Billy Wyatt	Emory Cohen	
Ted	John Bennett	Max Burkholder	
They Found Hell	Evan	Laurie Kynaston	
White Boy Rick	"White Boy" Rick Wershe Jr.	Richie Merritt	
Who Am I	Benjamin Engel	Tom Schilling	

==== Animation ====
Title	Role	Ref.
Thor: Tales of Asgard	Loki	
Walking with Dinosaurs	Ricky	
Unikitty!	Master Frown	
