= Terror in Resonance =

Japanese anime television series

- Key visual of the series

残響のテロル (Zankyō no Teroru)
- Genre: Psychological thriller
- Created by: Shinichirō Watanabe
- Anime television series
- Directed by: Shinichirō Watanabe
- Produced by: Koji Yamamoto; Makoto Kimura; Takamitsu Inoue
- Written by: Shōten Yano; Hiroshi Seko; Jun Kumagai; Kenta Ihara
- Music by: Yoko Kanno
- Studio: MAPPA
- Licensed by: Crunchyroll (Note: In North America through Crunchyroll, LLC (formerly known as Funimation).); AUS: Madman Entertainment; UK: Anime Limited
- Original network: Fuji TV (Noitamina)
- English network: SEA: Aniplus Asia
- Original run: July 10, 2014 – September 25, 2014
- Episodes: 11
- icon

Terror in Resonance (Japanese: 残響のテロル, Hepburn: Zankyō no Teroru; lit. 'Terror of the Echo'), also known as Terror in Tokyo, is a Japanese anime television series produced by MAPPA. The anime was created and directed by Shinichirō Watanabe, with character designs by Kazuto Nakazawa and music by Yoko Kanno. It was broadcast for eleven episodes on Fuji TV's Noitamina programming block from July to September 2014.

== Plot ==
Two teenage boys who go by the names Nine and Twelve steal a prototype atomic bomb in an apparent terrorist attack. Calling themselves "Sphinx" (スピンクス, Supinkusu), they upload a video onto the Internet and threaten to destroy Tokyo unless a cryptic riddle can be solved. They are two of the survivors of a secret experiment by the Rising Peace Academy to develop orphaned children with savant syndrome into human weapons. They befriend Lisa, a lonely high school girl, who becomes caught up in their plans to expose the nefarious activities of the organization.

== Characters ==
=== Main characters ===
Nine (ナイン, Nain) / Arata Kokonoe (九重 新, Kokonoe Arata)
Voiced by: Kaito Ishikawa (Japanese); Christopher Bevins (English)
A secretive young man with a bright mind and calm demeanor who moves to Tokyo and attends high school alongside Twelve under the name "Arata Kokonoe". He is one of the masterminds behind Sphinx. He and Twelve are survivors of a secret experiment by the Rising Peace Academy to develop 26 highly intelligent orphaned children into human weapons.
Twelve (ツエルブ, Tsuerubu) / Tōji Hisami (久見 冬二, Hisami Tōji)
Voiced by: Sōma Saitō (Japanese); Aaron Dismuke (English)
An apparently childish young man who is the second member of Sphinx. He is kind and caring, and befriends the lonely schoolgirl, Lisa. He uses the civilian identity of "Tōji Hisami" and is skilled at operating vehicles like motorbikes and snowmobiles. Twelve has synesthesia; that allows him to see sound as color. (Note: 冬 is homophonous with 十, the kanji for 10, and 二 is the kanji for 2.)
Lisa Mishima (三島 リサ, Mishima Risa)
Voiced by: Atsumi Tanezaki (Japanese); Jad Saxton (English)
A high school girl with a problematic life both at home and school. She is befriended by Nine and Twelve who save her from bullies at her school and she becomes caught up in their plans.
Kenjirō Shibazaki (柴崎 健次郎, Shibazaki Kenjirō)
Voiced by: Shunsuke Sakuya (Japanese); Robert McCollum (English)
A detective of the Tokyo Metropolitan Police Department who used to be an ace of the police force's investigations division, but was demoted to its records division after continuing an unauthorized investigation. He is highly intelligent and is called back into the force to investigate the terrorist group Sphinx.
Five (ハイヴ, Haivu)
Voiced by: Megumi Han (Japanese); Jamie Marchi (English)
She is the third survivor of the Rising Peace Academy experiment, highly competitive and has a love-hate relationship with Nine because of his talent. She becomes an American FBI operative who travels to Japan as part of her duties with NEST to lend support to the terrorist attack investigations. Her obsession with Nine exposes her willingness to endanger, or even kill, innocent people to get close to Nine and Twelve.

=== Supporting characters ===
Kurahashi (倉橋)
Voiced by: Hideaki Tezuka (Japanese); Sean Hennigan (English)
The chief of the Tokyo Metropolitan Police Department station, who heads the investigation into Nine and Twelve's bomb threats.
Hamura (羽村)
Voiced by: Keisuke Aigasa (Japanese); Ian Sinclair (English)
A passionate, young police officer who collaborates with Shibazaki even after he is suspended.
Okano (岡野)
Voiced by: Kunpei Sakamoto (Japanese); Kent Williams (English)
Kinoshita (木下)
Voiced by: Yūsuke Kuwahata (Japanese); Anthony Bowling (English)
Mukasa (六笠)
Voiced by: Mitsuaki Kanuka (Japanese); Jeremy Inman (English)
Shibazaki's co-worker from the records division who helps him solve Sphinx's riddles.
Shimada (島田)
Voiced by: Yutaka Aoyama (Japanese); J. Michael Tatum (English)
The head of Shibazaki's team and later the chief.
Hamada (浜田)
Voiced by: Yasuhiro Takato (Japanese); Kenny Green (English)
A scientist working to identify the bombing techniques used by Sphinx.
Kato (加藤, Katō)
Voiced by: Kei Yamaguchi (Japanese); Eric Vale (English)
Fukuda (福田)
Voiced by: Shinpachi Tsuji (Japanese); Mark Stoddard (English)
Clarence
Voiced by: Daisuke Takahashi (Japanese); David Wald (English)
Five's partner and an FBI agent.
Lisa's mother (リサの母親, Risa no Hahaoya)
Voiced by: Ayumi Tsunematsu (Japanese); Monica Rial (English)
Lisa's mother, who is highly paranoid and extremely possessive of Lisa due to her husband leaving the family home.
Haruka (はるか)
Voiced by: Reina Ueda (Japanese); Felecia Angelle (English)
Shibazaki's daughter who is studying particles.
Mamiya
Voiced by: Shuichiro Moriyama (Japanese); Grant James (English)
The creator of the Athena Project.

== Release ==
The anime was created and directed by Shinichirō Watanabe, with character designs by Kazuto Nakazawa and music by Yoko Kanno. The anime began airing on Fuji TV's Noitamina block on July 10, 2014, and its final episode aired on September 25, 2014. In total, it was made up of 11 episodes. Funimation acquired North American streaming rights and released an English dub on DVD on January 19, 2016. Anime Limited and Madman Entertainment acquired streaming rights for the UK and Australia, respectively. Funimation premiered the series at Anime Expo on July 5, 2014.

=== Episodes ===
No.	Title	Directed by	Written by	Original release date
1	"Falling"	Yuzuru Tachikawa	Shōten Yano	July 10, 2014
In Aomori, Japan, plutonium is stolen from a nuclear fuel reprocessing facility, and one of the young perpetrators sprays the letters "VON" at the scene in red paint. Six months later, the two teenagers, who refer to themselves as Nine and Twelve, interrupt the student Lisa Mishima's classmates as they bully her, then enroll in her school. A mysterious video is posted on social media by two masked teenagers called Sphinx 1 and 2, threatening a blackout and explosion in the Shinjuku area the following day. Demoted detective Shibazaki sees the video but does not take it seriously. The next day, while Lisa is in the Tokyo Metropolitan Government Building, the greater Tokyo prefecture loses power, and the building is evacuated. With video surveillance down across the city, Nine and Twelve place stuffed animals containing incendiary explosives next to the bearing pillars of the building. When Twelve is interrupted by Lisa, he gives her one of their stuffed animals and makes her promise to keep it with her. He asks Nine to decide whether they should kill her or let her live; his response is to let her decide whether to die or become an accomplice. Lisa does not want to die, so Twelve extracts her as the building crumbles. Twelve returns to their hideout with Lisa, who is unharmed, albeit confused.
2	"Call & Response"	Sayo Aoi	Shōten Yano	July 17, 2014
The police investigation reveals that high temperature thermite-based bombs were used in the attack. The building collapse left 27 people with minor injuries but no fatalities despite the large-scale destruction. Lisa returns home shaken by the incident. Her paranoid mother is upset because Lisa didn't reply to her many calls and accuses her of wanting to leave like her husband. Meanwhile, Nine and Twelve start work on a cellphone bomb. They release a second video with a riddle from Oedipus Rex hinting at their next bombsite's location. After deducing what appears to be the site referred to in the riddle, police move to the suspected location, a DNA laboratory. Shibazaki calls the police chief, Kurahashi, with an alternative interpretation of the riddle, suggesting that the bomb will be at the Roppongi police district office. After the bomb explodes in the district office instead of the lab, Kurahashi asks Shibazaki to return to the detective division from his exile in the archives. Kurahashi also shares information about the theft of the Aomori plutonium with Shibazaki, including the fact that the letters "VON" were found at both locations. Lisa follows Twelve to the scene of the explosion, but he threatens to kill her if she makes a wrong move.
3	"Search & Destroy"	Minoru Yamaoka	Shōten Yano	July 24, 2014
Shibazaki transfers to the police agency heading the investigation, to the dissatisfaction of several other detectives. Meanwhile, as Nine constructs another bomb, he deduces from the presence of counter-nuclear terrorism special forces that police are aware of his and Twelve's theft of the plutonium from the Aomori nuclear facility. Shibazaki learns that one of the men who stole the plutonium worked at the nuclear facility for a short time, but his identity has since been erased. Shibazaki then laments to Kurahashi that, as a Hiroshima native, he hated summer due to the fears held by the older townspeople who experienced the town's atomic bombing during World War II. Nine and Twelve send a third video with another riddle related to Oedipus Rex. Meanwhile, Lisa, unable to keep on living with her mentally unstable and abusive mother, runs away from home. Shibazaki solves the riddle during a live stream organized by the police, during which he announces the location of the newest bomb. Watching the live stream, the news coverage, and their own surveillance cameras, Nine realizes the police have connected them to the stolen plutonium. Kurahashi reveals to other officers the reason behind Shibazaki's demotion: fifteen years ago, he tried to investigate a cover-up of a death orchestrated by powerful people, who demoted him to the archives since he didn't want to play by their rules.
4	"Break Through"	Sayo Aoi	Hiroshi Seko	July 31, 2014
Nine hacks into the Metropolitan Police Department database searching for data. Twelve follows Lisa, concerned about her living on the streets. Nine sends a fourth video, titled "Time Shock Bomb," where he and Twelve present another riddle related to Oedipus Rex to find a hidden bomb timed to explode. Using the riddle, Shibazaki finds a website created by Nine and Twelve, which asks for a password related to three maxims inscribed at the temple at Delphi. Realizing that time is running out, the police raid an apartment building where Nine was recorded dropping off a suspicious package while Shibazaki is still trying to solve the riddle. Police officers breach the apartment, only to find a laptop instead of the expected explosives. Although Shibazaki solves the riddle a few minutes before the deadline, the timer doesn't stop as, as Nine puts it, the police are cheating. Afterward, all police files of the attacks are leaked online. At the same time, Twelve rescues Lisa from two police officers and takes her to their apartment. Nine is adamant that Lisa can't stay as they can't trust her. However, as they argue, Lisa, hungry and exhausted, collapses.
5	"Hide & Seek"	Yuzuru Tachikawa	Jun Kumagai	August 7, 2014
Nine and Twelve place a bomb on a passenger train, and when they return to the apartment, they find that Lisa had tried to prepare a meal for them, which she burned. Twelve later comments to Nine that even if the food was inedible, it was better than the bland and forgettable food at the institution. Nine and Twelve post another video with a riddle, saying that an explosion will occur unless it is solved before the deadline at 8.00 PM. Using clues from the riddle, Shibazaki concludes that the newest bomb is onboard a train on the Shuto Shinjuku Line. He also realizes that there is a connection between the bombings: the locations are linked to people connected to a seminar run by the Rising Peace Academy, a secretive non-profit organization. Time passes, and not only are there no reports of the bomb being recovered, but cellphone reception fails throughout the area. Twelve goes to deactivate the bomb on the train car while Nine tries to locate it but is cyber-attacked by someone from their past. Nine manages to find the correct location of the train car with the bomb and rushes to the station to remove it manually, throwing a smoke bomb into the carriage to force commuters off the train. However, one woman remains, and as he enters the train to save her, the bomb explodes. As Nine drags the commuter out of the wreckage, he receives a text message saying, "I found you ^^." Shibazaki confronts Kurahashi about the bombing, but he has the same information as everyone: they all thought the bomb squads would remove and deactivate the explosives; hence, they stood down. During their quarrel, a young woman is sitting nearby, quite pleased with herself.
6	"Ready or Not"	Minoru Yamaoka; Kazuya Iwata	Hiroshi Seko	August 14, 2014
The police chief announces to a meeting of his task force that a unit of the American Federal Bureau of Investigation (FBI) will join the investigation, surprising the other officers. Nine has a nightmare involving Five, and he and Twelve conclude that Five is continuing a game of chess the three played years ago back at the institution. Lisa offers to help them, and Nine reluctantly agrees. Kurahashi tells Shibazaki about his meeting with the FBI agents, which included Five, who were described as researchers from an American organization called the Nuclear Emergency Support Team (NEST). Posing as Sphinx, Five sends a public text message containing a riddle that can only be decoded via Caesar cipher. The answer is a set of coordinates leading to the International Terminal of Haneda Airport. The police are told to stand by on orders from the superintendent general, but Shibazaki and some others ignore the order and head towards the terminal. Knowing that a trap is being set by Five, Nine takes Lisa to the terminal with Twelve to avoid detection. Twelve then realizes that Five is using the terminal building as a chessboard.
7	"Deuce"	Ho Pyeon-gang	Jun Kumagai	August 21, 2014
Nine and Twelve decide to play Five's chess game. Arriving at the terminal, Shibazaki and the officers see messages being given to Nine and Twelve from Five on the terminal screens. Twelve gets Lisa to create a distraction by setting off flares, which trigger a fire alarm. Twelve then hacks into the camera system, enabling Nine to rush to find Five's location without being detected. He confronts Five and holds her at gunpoint, demanding to know why she is interfering in their plans. She responds that she wants to settle things with him and reveals that Lisa has been caught and is being held captive at the bomb's location. Airport police arrive and fire at Nine, forcing him to flee where he briefly passes Shibazaki. Nine finds Twelve, who receives a phone call from Lisa, who is aboard an airplane that has a bomb on board and is on autopilot heading towards a terminal filled with commuters. Nine contacts Shibazaki, convinces him that the latest bomb is not theirs, and instructs him to infiltrate the control tower and take control of the autopilot system. Nine and Twelve then rescue Lisa from the plane, while Shibazaki enters the control room and forces one of the operators to divert the plane away from the terminal at gunpoint. The plane explodes without injuring anyone, and Shibazaki spots a masked Nine, who signals him in thanks before leaving. Five, the person responsible for the bomb, manages to escape, but she has kept Lisa's school ID card.
8	"My Fair Lady"	Takashi Igari	Kenta Ihara	September 4, 2014
The media broadcasts that the foiled airport attack is the work of Sphinx. The officers who accompanied Shibazaki to Haneda Airport are suspended for three months by their boss, while Shibazaki is permanently suspended. Shibazaki learns from his daughter Haruka, a physics student, that a person could construct an atomic bomb from plutonium. Meanwhile, Five tracks down Lisa at the Sphinx hideout and sends a bomb, but Lisa escapes before it detonates. Nine, Twelve, and Lisa flee to an abandoned video arcade where Nine states that Lisa is a liability. Shibazaki continues his investigation and, while at the National Archives, he discovers that a decade ago, the Rising Peace Academy implemented an operation called the Athena Project. He visits Ichiro Fujiwaka, a politician who was involved, and threatens to expose his son's illegal activities. Fujiwaka reveals that orphaned children were gathered and tested, and those gifted with Savant syndrome were selected for the Athena Project. Suspended officer, Hamura, joins Shibazaki, and they continue their investigation. Feeling guilty, Lisa leaves Nine and Twelve, only to be captured by Five's allies in the FBI. Later, Twelve receives a threatening text message from Five, revealing that Lisa has been taken hostage. Rejecting Nine's pleas to focus on their mission, Twelve sets off to rescue Lisa.
9	"Highs & Lows"	Akitsugu Hisagi; Kenji Mutō	Hiroshi Seko	September 11, 2014
While Twelve goes to rescue Lisa, Nine leaves to retrieve the plutonium. Meanwhile, Shibazaki and Hamura visit Souta Aoki, the former welfare minister, to question him about the Athena Project. Surprisingly, Aoki tells them everything about it: its connection to the members of the Rising Peace Academy, the experiments on the gifted children within the "Settlement," and the use of drugs to produce the Savant syndrome artificially. Aoki says that Five was the only child to have survived the project. However, two other children, Nine and Twelve, managed to escape. He tells Shibazaki that the mastermind behind the project was Dr. Shunzo Mamiya, the politician behind Shibazaki's demotion. While Nine constructs the final bomb, Twelve reaches the amusement park and finds Lisa handcuffed on a Ferris wheel. Her body is laced with several bombs, and a timer activates when the ride begins to move. Twelve comforts her and begins disarming the bombs individually, although they both realize he cannot defuse them all in time. Twelve refuses to leave Lisa and reluctantly tells Five the location of the plutonium in exchange for stopping the timer. Five cuts the power to the Ferris wheel, trapping Twelve and Lisa midair. Five reveals that she knows they stole a prototype atomic bomb rather than plutonium. The Metropolitan Police Department raid the school where Nine has just retrieved the bomb. Five orders him captured alive before she suddenly collapses.
10	"Helter Skelter"	Masahiro Mukai	Kenta Ihara	September 18, 2014
Nine turns himself in to the police but refuses to speak to anyone but Shibazaki. He demands a press conference at a specific location and time, or he will activate the atomic bomb prototype. Shibazaki visits Shunzo Mamiya, who confesses that he created the Athena Project to revitalize Japan's national morale following the nation's defeat at the end of World War II. Five is hospitalized due to her deteriorating health as a consequence of the Athena Project experiments. She learns of Nine's surrender and desperately drives off to reach him. Five's accomplices pursue the police convoy carrying Nine to the press conference through Shuto Expressway, only to find that the truck is a decoy. Enraged and desperate, Five pursues Nine herself. Twelve catches them on his motorbike and stops the truck carrying Nine, but Five causes him to crash. FBI agent Clarence attempts to stop her, but she kills him. Five confesses to Nine that she always wanted to beat him but never could. Knowing that she is dying, Five gives him a brief kiss before committing suicide by detonating the spilled gasoline from her car. The Japanese airwaves are then hijacked by a prerecorded message from Nine stating that the countdown for the atomic bomb's detonation has begun. Declaring that this is the final message from Sphinx, Nine unmasks himself and bids the people of Japan farewell.
11	"VON"	Shinichirō Watanabe	Hiroshi Seko	September 25, 2014
Following Nine's announcement of the atomic bomb, Tokyo's population begins to evacuate. Lisa encounters a severely injured Twelve who collapses. Shibazaki reminds Hamura that Sphinx has killed no one and receives confirmation from his daughter Haruka that the bomb could explode in the stratosphere without causing fatalities. However, an electromagnetic pulse from the explosion would black out the country and disable any planes in flight. All commercial flights are ordered to land, and fighter jets are dispatched to intercept the bomb, but it has risen too high. Twelve regains consciousness and tells Lisa that he and Nine were always alone. The atomic bomb detonates, and the city is then plunged into darkness. It is followed by an aurora illuminating the sky formed by the radiation from the blast. The following day, passing Tokyo's abandoned buildings and streets, Nine sets up makeshift grave markers for the Athena Project children at the Settlement. He is joined by Twelve and Lisa, and the three then spend an enjoyable day together. As night falls, they are approached by Shibazaki, who promises that Project Athena will be exposed. Minutes later, U.S. helicopters arrive, and Nine withdraws a detonator and threatens to explode another atomic bomb. Under orders from their superiors to keep the American government's involvement in the investigation a secret, the soldiers open fire and kill Twelve. Shibazaki shields Nine and promises that Sphinx will be remembered. Nine surrenders the detonator before abruptly dying from the same affliction that killed Five. One year later, Project Athena is exposed, leaving the Japanese government under media scrutiny. Lisa encounters Shibazaki at the graves of Nine, Twelve, Five, and the other project children. Lisa reveals that Nine used to listen to Icelandic music and that "VON" was Icelandic for "hope."

=== Soundtrack ===
Terror in Resonance Original Soundtrack

Soundtrack album by Yoko Kanno
- Released: July 9, 2014
- Studio: Sundlaugin (Iceland); Sýrland (Iceland); High Bank (UK); ST-ROBO (Tokyo, Japan); ABS Recording (Shibuya, Tokyo, Japan); Greenbird (Shinjuku, Tokyo, Japan); Aobadai (Meguro, Tokyo, Japan); Prime Sound Studio Form (Meguro, Tokyo, Japan)
- Length: 69:12
- Label: Aniplex
- Producer: Yoko Kanno; Keisuke "Tommy" Tominaga (co-producer)

The soundtrack for the series was composed by Yoko Kanno and released before the anime aired on July 9, 2014, by Aniplex. The opening theme song is "Trigger", composed by Kanno and performed by Yuuki Ozaki from Galileo Galilei. The ending theme song is "Dareka, Umi o." (誰か、海を。, lit. 'Somebody, the Ocean.'), composed by Kanno and performed by Aimer. A later soundtrack titled "Terror in Resonance Original Soundtrack 2 -crystalized-" was released after the series ended on October 22, 2014. In addition to the new tracks, it contained the opening and ending songs. The artwork for the soundtrack was designed by Ingibjörg Birgisdóttir from Seabear.

In an interview with Otaku USA magazine, director Shinichirō Watanabe stated that the music of Icelandic post-rock band Sigur Rós was the inspiration for the show and its soundtrack.

When I was listening to Sigur Rós, I got the visual image of two boys standing in the ruins of a destroyed city and that led to the idea of Terror In Resonance. ... we actually went to Iceland to record our music ...

— Shinichirō Watanabe

All music is composed by Yoko Kanno, except where indicated.

Terror in Resonance Original Soundtrack
No.	Title	Lyrics	Artist	Length
1.	"lolol"			1:39
2.	"von" (featuring Arnór Dan)	Bragi Valdimar Skúlason from Baggalútur	Yoko Kanno, Arnór Dan	6:14
3.	"ess"			3:36
4.	"saga"			4:54
5.	"fugl"			2:28
6.	"hanna" (featuring Hanna Berglind)	Kanno	Kanno, Hanna Berglind	4:30
7.	"veat"			3:46
8.	"lava" (featuring Pop Etc)	Christopher Chu	Kanno, Pop Etc	4:51
9.	"walt"			3:14
10.	"birden" (featuring Arnór Dan)		Kanno, Arnór Dan	4:45
11.	"Fa"			5:38
12.	"nc17"			4:43
13.	"ís" (featuring Pop Etc)	Chris Chu from Pop Etc, Keisuke "Tommy" Tominaga	Kanno, Pop Etc	2:41
14.	"22" (featuring Ryo Nagano)	Chu, Tominaga	Kanno, Ryo Nagano	2:44
15.	"seele"			2:03
16.	"lev low"			2:34
17.	"ili lolol"			5:41
18.	"bless" (featuring Arnór Dan)		Kanno, Arnór Dan	3:11
Total length:				69:12

Terror in Resonance Original Soundtrack 2 -crystalized-

Soundtrack album by Yoko Kanno
- Released: Oct 22, 2014
- Studio: Sundlaugin (Iceland); Sýrland (Iceland); ST-ROBO (Tokyo, Japan); ABS Recording (Shibuya, Tokyo, Japan); Prime Sound Studio Form (Meguro, Tokyo, Japan); Prime Sound Studio (Minato, Tokyo, Japan); Hit (Sapporo, Hokkaido, Japan)
- Length: 59:53
- Label: Aniplex
- Producer: Yoko Kanno; Keisuke "Tommy" Tominaga (co-producer)

All music is composed by Yoko Kanno, except where indicated.

Terror in Resonance Original Soundtrack 2 -crystalized-
No.	Title	Lyrics	Music	Artist	Length
1.	"Trigger"	Yuuki Ozaki from Galileo Galilei	Kanno	Ozaki	5:05
2.	"kvak"				3:00
3.	"crystalized"				2:57
4.	"cket"				1:39
5.	"ioloi"				2:52
6.	"wilhelm"				4:45
7.	"Dobu to Kobune to Bokura no Shinwa (ドブと小舟と僕らの神話)" (full version)	Ozaki	Kanno	Ozaki	4:44
8.	"velle"				4:25
9.	"orfn"				1:34
10.	"juno"				2:03
11.	"wolke"				3:15
12.	"alois"				3:13
13.	"future terror"				3:42
14.	"vad"				3:40
15.	"pcp"				3:14
16.	"vial"				2:05
17.	"elan"				2:46
18.	"Dareka, Umi wo. (誰か、海を。, 'Somebody, the Ocean.)"	Ichiko Aoba	Kanno	Aimer	4:54
Total length:					59:53

== Reception ==
=== Critical response ===
Nick Creamer of Anime News Network gave the anime series an "A", and described it as "the direction is basically flawless, and the semi-realistic art design keeps the show grounded while also offering consistent moments of larger-than-life beauty. Overall, Terror in Resonance is just short of a masterpiece. When it comes to ideas and execution, the show is absolutely bulletproof, a gorgeous and cutting meditation on the contradictory complexities of modern society. Its characters rage at a system that no one truly wants, caught up in cycles the show frames as tragically inevitable. In the context of its well-earned cynicism, its few moments of honest human connection feel all the more precious, brought home by expert framing and brilliant use of music. A rich and passionate meditation on modern society that is elevated by some of the finest music and visuals in anime".

In 2015, the Chinese Ministry of Culture listed Terror in Resonance among 38 anime and manga titles banned in China. Officials stated that the aforementioned series "include scenes of violence, pornography, terrorism and crimes against public morality" that could potentially incite minors to commit such acts as reasons for the ban.

=== Accolades ===
Terror in Resonance was awarded "Anime of the Year", "Best Original Anime of the Year" and "Mystery or Psychological Anime of the Year" at the 1st Anime Trending Awards in 2014. The series has won the French award "Daruma d'or anime" at the Japan Expo Awards 2016. It was part of the Jury Selections at the 18th Japan Media Arts Festival in the Animation category in 2014.
