= Advanced Generation =

Advanced Generation may refer to:

== In real life ==
- Vega (rocket) (also known as Advanced Generation European Carrier Rocket), an expandable launch system

== In popular culture ==
- The Advanced Generation arc of the Pokémon anime
- Mobile Suit Gundam AGE, the AGE (Advanced Generation Era) arc of Gundam anime and manga series
