= Mobile Suit Gundam AGE =

Japanese anime television series

機動戦士ガンダムAGE (Kidō Senshi Gandamu AGE)
- Genre: Mecha
- Created by: Hajime Yatate; Yoshiyuki Tomino
- Anime television series
- Directed by: Susumu Yamaguchi
- Written by: Akihiro Hino; Kazuho Hyodo (assistant)
- Music by: Kei Yoshikawa
- Studio: Sunrise
- Licensed by: NA: Sunrise
- Original network: JNN (MBS, TBS)
- Original run: October 9, 2011 – September 23, 2012
- Episodes: 49
- Manga

Mobile Suit Gundam AGE: Story of the Beginning
- Written by: Hiroshi Nakanishi
- Published by: Shogakukan
- Magazine: Weekly Shōnen Sunday
- Original run: October 5, 2011 – October 12, 2011
- Manga

Mobile Suit Gundam AGE: First Evolution
- Written by: Hiyon Katsuragi
- Published by: Kadokawa
- Magazine: Gundam Ace
- Original run: December 2011 – August 2012
- Volumes: 3
- Manga

Mobile Suit Gundam AGE: Treasure Star
- Written by: Masanori Yoshida
- Published by: Shogakukan
- Magazine: CoroCoro Comic
- Original run: September 15, 2011 – May 15, 2012
- Volumes: 2
- Manga

Mobile Suit Gundam AGE: Memories of SID
- Written by: Hiroshi Nakanishi
- Published by: Shogakukan
- Magazine: Shōnen Sunday S
- Original run: January 25, 2012 – October 25, 2012
- Volumes: 3
- Original video animation

Mobile Suit Gundam AGE: Memory of Eden
- Directed by: Shinya Watada
- Written by: Noboru Kimura
- Music by: Kei Yoshikawa
- Studio: Sunrise
- Licensed by: NA: Sunrise
- Released: July 26, 2013
- Runtime: 150 minutes

Mobile Suit Gundam AGE (Japanese: 機動戦士ガンダムAGE, Hepburn: Kidō Senshi Gandamu Eiji) is a 2011 Japanese science fiction anime television series and the twelfth installment in Sunrise's long-running Gundam franchise. The series was first announced in the July issue of Shogakukan's CoroCoro Comic, and has gaming company Level-5's President Akihiro Hino in charge of the story.

This installment of the Gundam meta-series is set on a futuristic Earth plagued by an interplanetary war that spans a whole century. Its story revolves around three protagonists from the same family, each piloting his own version of the eponymous mecha, fighting to defend Earth and its space colonies from an enemy race far more advanced in terms of technology.

The series was officially unveiled by Bandai on June 13, 2011, during a special event at the 2011 Tokyo Toy Show. Gundam AGE premiered on the MBS and TBS broadcasting stations in Japan on October 9, 2011 and 49 episodes were broadcast, with the final episode on September 23, 2012. A compilation OVA titled Mobile Suit Gundam AGE: Memory of Eden was released on July 26, 2013, focusing on the second protagonist of the series, Asemu Asuno.

== Plot ==
The story of Gundam AGE is separated into four arcs, with the first three focusing on a different protagonist, and the last, the "Three Generations" arc, focusing on all three previous protagonists.

=== Flit Asuno (A.G 115) ===
In A.G. 101 (the 101st year of the Advanced Generation calendar) a mysterious entity known at the time only as "UE", or "Unknown Enemy", attacks and destroys the space colony Angel. This brutal attack becomes infamous as "The Day the Angel Fell", and marks the beginning of the "One Hundred Years War". The series begins in A.G. 108 when the UE attack the space colony Ovan, where Flit Asuno lives with his mother after they escaped colony Angel before its destruction. Flit's mother is mortally wounded by the UE, but before dying she gives her son the "AGE Device", containing the blueprints for a powerful weapon from the past—the ancient messiah named "Gundam."

Flit spends the next several years studying engineering at an Earth Federation base on the Nora space colony while designing the Gundam AGE-1 from the AGE Device's blueprints. Seven years later, in A.G. 115, Flit completes the Gundam AGE-1 Normal, just as the UE attacks Nora, and makes use of it to aid the crew of Federation's battleship "Diva" in evacuating the colony's citizens before it is destroyed. Determined to bring the battle to the U.E. for destroying his home twice, Flit agrees to serve at Diva's mobile suit squad piloting the Gundam.

After gathering enough intel and military power to establish a course of action, the crew of Diva and their allies launch a successful attack to destroy the U.E.'s secret fortress in the Ambat asteroid. In the occasion, they learn that the U.E. are actually the descendants of a failed human mission sent to colonize Mars, left for dead by the Earth Federation, who formed their own nation on the red planet called "Vagan".

=== Asemu Asuno (A.G 140-142) ===
25 years after the battle at Ambat, the Federation's war against Vagan keeps escalating with no end at sight as their enemies rejected all offers for a peace treaty. Flit, now married and father of two is a commander of the Earth forces determined to destroy the Vagans and chooses his son Asemu to succeed him as the Gundam's pilot, entrusting him with the AGE Device on his 17th birthday. After successfully defending his colony from Vagan attacks with the Gundam AGE-1, Asemu enlists into the military and just like his father before him, he joins Diva's mobile suit squad piloting AGE-1's successor unit, the Gundam AGE-2.

Under Flit's command, the federation forces, spearheaded by Asemu and the crew of Diva successfully stops several Vagan attempts to progress with their invasion of Earth. Flit also manages to expose a large scale conspiracy involving several corrupt authorities in cahoots with the Vagans, leading to a massive shift of power in the Earth Sphere. Ten years later, just after the birth of his son Kio, Asemu leaves for a final mission that ends with his disappearance, although his AGE Device was retrieved and entrusted to Kio.

=== Kio Asuno/Three Generations (A.G 164) ===
After deploying several sleeper agents around the globe, the Vagans launch a surprise attack that finally brings the war to the Earth. To counter the invasion, Flit activates the recently completed Gundam AGE-3 and entrusts it to Kio. Just like his father and grandfather before him, Kio enlists into the Diva as part of its mobile suit squad to confront the Vagans. Just after reaching space, Flit and Kio has an encounter with the Bisidian space pirates, and discover, much to their surprise, that Asemu is still alive and working with them, piloting a heavily modified version of his Gundam AGE-2, named the Gundam AGE-2 Dark Hound.

The Diva's crew learn from Asemu about the existence of EXA-DB, an ancient military database containing strategic data that can provide an overwhelming advantage to whoever side secures it. However, their plans to retrieve it are halted when Kio is captured along with his Gundam by the Vagans and put under custody of their leader Fezarl Ezelcant. Soon after Kio is rescued by Asemu and his pirate comrades, but his Gundam AGE-3 is almost totally destroyed. After returning to Earth, Kio rejoins the crew of Diva piloting the AGE System's ultimate mobile suit, the Gundam AGE-FX.

Fighting together for the first time, Flit, Asemu and Kio lead the federal forces and the Bisidian in a successful attempt to recapture the Federation's main base on the moon from the Vagans. After Asemu locates and destroys the EXA-DB to ensure that neither side claims it, the Earth Federation and the Vagans focus all their efforts in one final battle at Earth's orbit. The battle ends when the Vagan main colony "Second Moon" is about to be destroyed, and Kio convinces Flit to abandon his grief and rally both the Federation and Vagan soldiers to work together and save the colony. After the conflict, the Federation and the Vagans make use of their military research to finally render the planet Mars habitable and Flit becomes remembered as a savior who united all mankind for a brighter future.

== Production ==
=== Development ===
Development of Mobile Suit Gundam AGE began when Akihiro Hino and Level-5 were first hired by Sunrise to develop a Gundam video game. Interested with working for the Gundam franchise, Hino wrote a plot summary for an anime which Bandai eventually saw and decided to create an anime based on it. The script was eventually green-lit and was first announced in the July issue of Shogakukan's CoroCoro Comic.

Many of the staff behind Gundam AGE is also the same staff members who created the previous series Mobile Suit Gundam 00. Susumu Yamaguchi, who previously worked as a director in the Sgt Frog franchise, was in charge of the direction of the series. Michinori Chiba and Takuzō Nagano were both in charge of the character designs of the series while Kanetake Ebikawa, Junya Ishigaki, and Kenji Teraoka were all contributing to the mechanical designs.

The series was originally planned to be a year-and-a-half long in length; however, sometime during broadcast, it was determined that the show be cut short to the final length of 49 episodes. Gundam AGE thus followed Mobile Suit Gundam and After War Gundam X as Gundam series that were cut short.

A new OVA project titled Gundam AGE: Memories of Eden recompiling the second arc of the anime series which focused on protagonist Asemu Asuno and his major antagonist, Zeheart Gallete, was made. The OVA features new footage totaling one hour.

=== Release ===
Mobile Suit Gundam AGE premiered at October 9, 2011 on the terrestrial MBS and TBS networks at 5:00 p.m on Sundays, replacing Blue Exorcist. Mobile Suit Gundam AGE was the first Gundam series to be simulcast on YouTube, which has become a standard practice for Gundam. Despite this, the show was criticized for its tone and for feeling that it relied too heavily on making homages to previous shows in the franchise. For the tenth anniversary in 2022, Bandai Namco announced the release of a Blu-Ray boxset of the series, including the OVA.

=== Music ===
The music in the series is composed by Kei Yoshikawa, most famous for composing musical scores for the anime Basquash!.

The first opening song, "Asu e" by Galileo Galilei and the ending, "Kimi no Naka no Eiyū" (君の中の英雄; "The Hero Within You") by Minami Kuribayashi were used from episodes 1 to 15. From episodes 16 to 28, "Sharp#" by Negoto and "My World" by SPYAIR were used as the opening and ending themes, respectively. From episode 29 to 39, the opening theme was "Real" by Vivid, and the ending theme was "White Justice" by Faylan. Episode 40 onwards has "Aurora" by Eir Aoi as the opening and "Forget-me-not (Wasurenagusa)" by Flower as the ending.

== Media ==
=== Manga ===
Two manga adaptations of the series have been announced. Mobile Suit Gundam AGE: Story of the Beginning (機動戦士ガンダムAGE 〜始まりの物語〜, Kidō Senshi Gandamu Eiji: Hajimari no Monogatari) by Hiroshi Nakanishi was published in Shogakukan's Weekly Shōnen Sunday. This two-chapter adaptation of the beginning of the anime features a different AGE System from the show. Instead of using the AGE Builder, Gundam AGE-1 is able to analyze its surroundings and incorporate machinery that are appropriate for the combat situation it is in. The other adaptation is published in Kadokawa's Gundam Ace, titled Mobile Suit Gundam AGE: First Evolution, was drawn by Hiyon Katsuragi and serialized from December 2011 to August 2012 issues. It is compiled into three tankōbon volumes.

Two sidestory manga have also been released. The first is entitled Mobile Suit Gundam AGE: Treasure Star. Written and drawn by Masanori Yoshida and serialized in Shogakukan's CoroCoro Comic, it features a group of adventurers exploring space in the ship "Treasure Star". The second sidestory manga titled Mobile Suit Gundam AGE: Memories of Sid is serialized in Shōnen Sunday S on January 25, 2012 and ended on October 25, 2012. Drawn by Hiroshi Nakanishi, the story is set before the third generation, dealing with Asemu's first encounter with the EXA-DB and SID. It also shows his decision to fake his death and join the Space Pirate Group Bisidian. The series is compiled into three tankōbon volumes.

=== Games ===
Mobile Suit Gundam: Try Age is a 2011 Data Carddass card game as well as an arcade game developed by both Level-5 and Bandai-Namco Games. The game utilizes cards as well as the sensors in the Gage-ing Builder model kits. Some of the characters and units from the series were also included in SD Gundam G Generation 3D and G Generation OVERWORLD.

Mobile Suit Gundam AGE: Universe Accel and Cosmic Drive is a role-playing video game by Level-5 for the PlayStation Portable. It was released on August 30, 2012.

In 2014, Mobile Suit Gundam Extreme Vs. MAXI BOOST has the AGE-1 and the AGE-2 as playable units, and later added the Zeydra, the AGE-3 and the Legilis. Also, the Vagan Gear equipped with SID serve as a boss.

In 2015, Mobile Suit Gundam Extreme Vs. Extreme VS Force announced the addition of the AGE-1 Gundam as a playable unit.

In 2015, Bandai announced the addition of Mobile Suit Gundam Age to the Super Robot Wars franchise in the game Super Robot Wars BX.

In 2016, Mobile Suit Gundam Extreme Vs. MAXI BOOST ON includes the AGE-FX as a playable unit, and later followed by the AGE-2 Dark Hound and the Farsia with Zedas assist unit. The western release of Gundam Extreme Vs. MAXI BOOST ON included Mobile Suit Gundam AGE as part of its lineup.

In 2017, Bandai Namco announced the addition of the AGE-1 Gundam to the PlayStation 4 title Gundam Versus.

In 2018, Mobile Suit Gundam Extreme Vs. 2 includes the AGE-1 Glansa as a playable unit and later supplant by the Fawn Farsia.

In 2020, SD Gundam G Generation Cross Rays included content from Mobile Suit Gundam AGE as part of its Dispatch Mission Set 4 DLC, which featured a mission starring the character Kio Asuno as well as various mobile suits from the setting.

As of 2022, Gundam AGE is present in SD Gundam Battle Alliance as the Gundam AGE-FX is featured as DLC Content.

Preceded by Model Suit Gunpla Builders Beginning G	Gundam metaseries (production order); 2011–2012	Succeeded by Gundam Build Fighters
