= List of Hamatora: The Animation episodes =

- The cover of Hamatora: The Animation Blu-ray volume.
- No. of episodes: 12

Release
- Original network: TV Tokyo
- Original release: January 8 – March 26, 2014

Season chronology
- Next → Re:_Hamatora

Hamatora: The Animation (ハマトラ The Animation) is a 2014 supernatural, mystery anime series based on the Japanese mixed-media project, Hamatora. In the year 2014, select humans called Minimum Holders have been discovered to possess supernatural abilities. Fellow Minimum Holders—Nice and Murasaki form a detective agency called "Hamatora" based in the Nowhere Café in Yokohama where they prefer to sit around all day with their friends and wait for clients. However, when they are approached by the Police Officer, Art for their help in investigating a string of serial murders throughout the city, the duo reluctantly decide to involve themselves in the case when they learn of the murderer's sole target—Minimum Holders.

The anime's first season adaptation is produced by NAZ of Japan and chiefly directed by Seiji Kishi. In addition, Hiroshi Kimura is also directing the anime, along with series composers and script writers Jun Kumagai and Touko Machida. The soundtrack music is composed by Makoto Yoshimori. Character designs are done by Yū Wazu, based on the original character designs by Blood Lad's Yūki Kodama along with art direction by Fantasista Utamaro. The project was composed by Yukinori Kitajima. The season is followed by Re:_Hamatora which premiered in Japan in July 2014.

The twelve-episode series premiered on TV Tokyo between January 8, 2014, and March 26, 2014. This was followed by later airings on TVA, TVO and AT-X. The series was picked up by Crunchyroll for online simulcast streaming in North America and other select parts of the world. Avex Group released the series in Japan on four Blu-ray and DVD volumes between April 25 and July 25, 2014. Sentai Filmworks has licensed the anime in North America for digital and home media release. The series was released on Blu-ray and DVD in September 2014 with English and Japanese audio and English subtitles.

The series uses three pieces of musical themes: one opening theme, one ending theme and one insert song. The opening theme is "Flat" by Livetune feat. Yuuki Ozaki, while the ending theme is "Hikari" by Wataru Hatano. The insert song of episode twelve is "Nowhere Living Now" by Kishō Taniyama, also known as Torao.

== Episode list ==
Individual episodes are called files, such as "File-01", "File-02", and so forth.

No.	Official English title (Note: All English titles are taken from Crunchyroll.) Original Japanese title	Directed by	Original release date	Refs.
1	"Egg of Columbus"; Transliteration: "Koronbusu no Tamago" (Japanese: コロンブスの卵)	Hiroshi Kimura	January 8, 2014	
Nice and Murasaki take two job requests from Koneko to investigate the recent kidnapping of college girls and another by Shinji Toyosaki to protect a safe from thieves. At the same time, Birthday and Ratio head off on a bodyguard request to protect a client. With help from Art, Nice deduces that the kidnappers were targeting the girls for information and theorizes that their cases may be linked. Nice then calls Birthday and Ratio for confirmation just as they are attacked by a Gravity Minimum Holder who forces their client, Azuza to reveal a code. Afterwards Azuza reveals that she and her college friends had been seeing the somniloquous Toyosaki patriarch from whom she accidentally learnt the code. Realizing that the kidnappers and thieves are the same group after the safe Nice, Ratio and Birthday head over to the Toyosaki mansion just as the thieves make their move. While Ratio and Birthday take out the thieves, Nice shows up during Murasaki's stare-down with the hired Gravity Holder and defeats the latter with his Holder ability. Afterwards, as the police and Art apprehend the thieves, the latter contemplates on telling Hamatora of a serial murderer targeting Minimum Holders.
2	"Beloved Bastard"; Transliteration: "Itoshiki Kusoyarou" (Japanese: 愛しきクソヤロウ)	Ueno Fumihiro	January 15, 2014	
Nice and Murasaki infiltrate Yokohamabane High School following a request from two students named Theo and Rei to search for their missing teacher, Yasuo Kitazawa. Sometime later, Art summons Nice and Murasaki after discovering the murdered Kitazawa in a burger restaurant and explains the serial murder case to them. Nice also steals Kitazawa's phone from the crime scene and obtains the six photos of Theo's bullies supposedly leaked on the internet. Nice then traces the poster's IP back to Kitazawa's home and deduces that he had been using his Realism Minimum to turn descriptions of the bullies' exploits into pictures which he then used to further his reputation over their exposure. Afterwards, as the Hamatora PI's establish a link between the photos and the recent serial bombings, Theo stumbles upon his former bully and the serial bomber, Yatsua Kojima in his latest bombing attempt at the school using his Time Acceleration Minimum. However Nice and Murasaki show up just in time to foil the bombing. Afterwards, Art discovers that Kojima and the Gravity Holder obtained their abilities artificially which would require the use of a Minimum Holder's brain. Elsewhere, the serial killer admires his collection of brains.
3	"Those With and Those Without"; Transliteration: "Motsu mono, Mota zaru mono" (Japanese: 持つ者、持たざる者)	Sasaki Mikotonori Yoshimi	January 22, 2014	
Shouko Itou of the Association for Health, Protection and Equality of Youths contracts Hamatora to search for a scandal within Facultas Academy. Meanwhile, Art questions Professor Moral after learning that the Association had been providing large quantities of the Nemcrois drug for his research into non-innate Minimum Holders. Moral explains his warped interest into a world where everyone possesses Minimum abilities and taunts Art on his graduation from Facultas despite not possessing a Minimum. Meanwhile, a large monstrous figure crashes a public Association meeting and reveals itself as Itou's son, Takahiro before escaping. As Art makes his way to the scene, Moral implies that he had given the Minimum ability to Takahiro, with the former swearing to arrest him. Afterwards, Nice blames Itou for Takahiro's change. Realizing that he was being challenged however, Nice approaches Takahiro while Moral also comes to the same conclusion as Takahiro, that it would be worth challenging Facultas' top graduate—Nice to see if he had surpassed natural Minimum Holders with his abilities. However in the end, Nice makes quick work of Takahiro. In the epilogue, Moral burns down his facility and escapes before Gasquet can arrest him. At the same time, Itou's assistant severs his support of Moral's research. Unperturbed, Moral then sets his sights on Nice.
4	"The Wandering Totem Pole"; Transliteration: "Samayou Tōtemu Pōru" (Japanese: 彷徨うトーテムポール)	Takuma Suzuki	January 29, 2014	
While Hamatora helps film a commercial as a publicity stunt to cover up Takahiro's rampage, Art has Minimum Holders—Honey and Three assist in a case. This causes Honey to misplace her briefcase for one filled with totem poles at the airport. Elsewhere, Art and Gasquet follow up on a string of attempted robberies committed by minors using guns obtained via a threatening email which also predicts an insurrection. While a group of men kidnap Honey because of the briefcase, Art enlists Nice to help in the gun case. Three eventually rescues Honey and discovers the kidnappers to be smuggling gun parts into the city. Afterwards, Nice establishes a link between the gun case and a popular online video by Katsuragi Yuuki using subliminal messaging while unaware that Moral had been the one manipulating Katsuragi. Meanwhile, Honey tracks down her briefcase from a smugger and discovers that the totem poles contain gun parts. After relaying this to Art, he has her predict the location of the insurrection and the police foil it just in time with Hamatora's help. Afterwards, Art and Nice discover the murdered Katsuragi at his home and Nice likens to himself to the mastermind despite having no knowledge of Moral's connection.
5	"Sweat, Muscles, and Me"; Transliteration: "Ase to Kinniku to Atashi" (Japanese: 汗と筋肉とアタシ)	Shinsuke Terasawa	February 5, 2014	
Hajime wins a trip to the hotsprings and goes alongside Koneko and Honey. Nice and Murasaki are requested by their new client to track down her boyfriend. Arata Hasuda, believing he is cheating on her. Nice accepts the job upon learning they have to go to the same hotsprings. There, the duo finds Ratio, Birthday and Three have also come on their own agenda. The inn is then attacked by thieves controlled by a Minimum Holder, Hasuda, able to attract men with his sweat. Feeling insulted by the criminals for dismissing the girls, Hajime fights against them using her Minimum. Hajime easily dispatches the criminals but Hasuda manages to escape. As it is revealed, Hasuda was trying to capture crown prince of Abachahat. He planned to use the prince to request Japan to reinstate his lover as an idol. Due to the police coming to inn and the manipulated criminals admiring their leader's desire, the Hasuda tries to commit suicide but is stopped by Hajime. As Nice and the others learn that the terrorist had an artificial Minimum, Gasquet kills a man while searching for data.
6	"The Prophet's Torment"; Transliteration: "Yogen-sha no Kunō" (Japanese: 予言者の苦悩)	Fumio Ito	February 12, 2014	
A young girl named Chiyu starts working with a western artist. However, she is kidnapped and Ratio and Birthday work on the case involving someone who has been their friend since school. Meanwhile, another Minimum is murdered by Moral and Honey realizes Art does not want to get Nice into the case. Ratio and Birthday interrogate a friend from the victim, Misty, but fail to get clues about her. Nice and Murasaki are also requested a job by the artist Torao. Birthday is kidnapped by another person who wishes to kidnap Misty. As Misty and Ratio go to find the kidnapper, they later remember how as a kid he distanced himself from others due to being able to predict people's deaths and the ill Birthday's survival to an operation resulted in their friendship. Ratio finds Birthday and Chiyu and sees the mastermind is Chiyu's manager. The manager reveals his own Minimum and fights Ratio until Birthday assists him and forces him to escape. Nice and Murasaki then arrive and defeat the manager after being hired to capture him. The group learns from the manager that he got an artificial Minimum and Nice goes to tell Art he already knows the serial killer's identity, Moral, just as he takes Gasquet's form with his Minimum.
7	"Black Cosmos"; Transliteration: "Kuroi Kosumosu" (Japanese: 黒いコスモス)	Shunji Yoshida	February 19, 2014	
Nice becomes involved in the case to arrest Moral and his constant recommendations offend Art. Gasquet notices the recent changes in Art's behavior and asks Honey about his past. Honey explains Art went to the Facultas Academy with his late younger brother and as a result of not awakening his Minimum he has been forcing himself to stand out despite not having it. Art's teacher, Three, takes the young man to train together and remind him that despite not having a Minimum he has already proven himself. Meanwhile, Nice and Murasaki receive a job from a man whose abuse on women result in a group of people trying to beat him up in revenge. Having to calm both forces using force bothers Nice and decides to go meet Art. Art finds Moral in the near his brother's grave and the criminal reveals his intentions to make everybody Minimum Holders so that they become equals to Nice, whom he admires. Following Art's refusal to receive a Minimum, Moral stabs him and kills him as Art tries to answer Nice's phone call but not before revealing him an unknown truth.
8	"The Blood-Soaked Bitter Melon"; Transliteration: "Gōya wa chi ni Nurete" (Japanese: ゴーヤは血に濡れて)	Taiki Nishimura	February 26, 2014	
Moral takes the form of late Art to answer Nice's phone call and starts acting like him. Later, Nice and Murasaki receive a job where they have to find the manufacturer of a drug that sends people into eternal sleep. Nice and Murasaki go to the area with Theo and Rei who visit the beach. There, Theo has an argument with a gang and decides to settle by competing in a triathlon. Shortly afterwards, Nice takes advantage of Theo's appearance to attract a drugdealer who would take him to the drug's manufacturer. Nice and Murasaki learn the manufacturer has taken his own drugs and is their client's brother. In compensation for being used, Theo requests Nice to participate in the triathlon with him. Before the competition, Murasaki talks with the unconscious drug dealer, feeling related as both are constantly overshadowed by others. In the triathlon, the rival gang has hired Honey, Three, Birthday and Ratio but they are disqualified shortly after the beginning. In the final act, Murasaki joins the rival gang to challenge Nice on a one-on-one while bringing the comatose man to see him fight. Although Nice wins, the drug dealer awakes and starts arguing with his brother. Meanwhile, Moral and his assistant Momoka commence a surgery.
9	"Little Beauty and the Beast"; Transliteration: "Bishōjo to Yajū" (Japanese: 美少女と野獣)	Shinichi Suzuki	March 5, 2014	
Three goes to an orphanage to take care of kids as he and Honey are removed from the murder case by Moral using the disguise of Art. Nice goes on search of one of Moral's allies but fails to confirm any alignment. He and Murasaki are given the task of capturing Three who is revealed to be a former mercenary. In order to get past the media working near the orphanage, Ratio and Birthday disguise as fruit delivery people and bring Honey to the place by hiding her in fruits. Honey learns from Three he is bringing up these kids as a form of self-punishment for the people he killed (the people were the children's parents) as he believes revenge is not a sin. An angered Honey decides to join him to make the children learn revenge is not good. In the following night, Nice and Murasaki find soldiers near the orphanage led by a Minimum Holder, Masayoshi Helenlee, who admires Three's past and is disgusted by his current state. While Murasaki and Honey protect the kids, Nice and Three take down Masayoshi who activates a gadget to burn his soldiers and thus the orphanage. Deciding to value the children's life over killing Masayoshi thanks a promise he made to Honey, Three manages to get the orphans out of the burning place. In the epilogue, Moral gathers a group of people to start a revolution.
10	"March of the Weak"; Transliteration: "Jakusha no Kōshin" (Japanese: 弱者の行進)	Asami Matsuo	March 12, 2014	
Taking advantage of Three's rescue, Moral spreads his followers through the city, murdering people they held a grudge against using their Minimums while Moral's assistant Momoka leaks information about Facultas. During the crisis, Takahiro goes to the Hamatora as there was an outbreak of Minimum Holders in prison due to a group known as Black Cosmos. He requests Hamatora a way to recover his body's normal form but Nice rejects the job Hajime decides to help Takahiro by making him going through a diet while Murasaki aids her despite Nice's reclutance. Meanwhile, society becomes concerned about Minimum Holders. Momoka leaks the address of the people discriminating Minimum Holders to bring them chaos. The discrimination against Holders results in Three and Honey losing the rights to take care of the orphans. Ratio and Birthday go to save their Chiyu who is also being attacked for her powers. Nice decides to contact Art but is confused to see the new items in his office. Nice then spots Moral around while Momoka goes to visit an unknown individual.
11	"Flight of the Victor"; Transliteration: "Shōsha no Haisō" (Japanese: 勝者の敗走)	Fumio Ito	March 19, 2014	
Nice and Moral go to the Nowhere Café as the disturbance in the streets increases. Nice explains that thanks to Honey he was able to find Moral and asks him what he did to Art. After explaining to Nice he already knows the answer, Moral talks about how the Essence is a substance he extracted from an innate Minimum Holder's brains to unlock new powers. Using Essence, Moral wishes to create a world with equality and Nice agrees with some of his ideals. Meanwhile, Ratio has Chiyu treated while Honey and Three are requested help with the riots by the police. Moral then explains his motivation to "save" Nice by making others equal to him but it makes Nice laugh for his decisions of who is weak and strong. Murasaki then fights Minimum Holders causing disturbance alongside. The civic center against Minimum Holders is then attacked by a tank. Moral leaves Nowhere by threatening Koneko, promising Nice he will fight him after finishing something. Takahiro and Hajime go to the civic center to protect the former's mother from the Minimum Holders. He then starts mutating again to fight his enemies. Takahiro is victorious and his mother thanks him. Staring at the situation, a saddened Moral makes Takahiro's body explode angering Nice while Hajime unleashes an unknown power.
12	"Resolve (Ego)"; Transliteration: "Kakugo (Ego)" (Japanese: 覚悟（エゴ）)	TBA	March 26, 2014	
Hajime's power takes down one Minimum Holder before falling asleep. Society becomes desiring of obtaining their own Minimum afraid of the attacks from Black Cosmos. However, Birthday, Ratio, Honey and Three work together to take down Moral's allies. As Momoka sees every fight scene, she is found by Gasquet. Murasaki handles Moral's last underlings while Nice confronts Moral personally in a ship. There, Moral reveals he unleashed the Forbidden Minimum Holder on himself which allows him to overwhelm Nice. Moral then explains how he has captured the Minimum Holder Hibiki whose ability was a scream at a frequency that killed people and will be used to torment non-Minimum Holders by causing them to go deaf, but only to those who took part in slandering others. As Moral continues to beat Nice, Murasaki tries to aid his partner but suffers a similar fate. Theo and all of the people that were aided by Nice try to bring him support, but he is annoyed by their repeated messages. Nice fights on and overwhelms Moral whose body deteriorates as a result of having two Minimums. He is then approached by the seemingly alive Art who shoots Moral and points and pins his gun at Nice's head. A shot can be heard as everything fades to black.

== Home media ==
Avex Group began releasing the series in Japan on Blu-ray and DVD volumes starting on April 25, 2014. People who purchased the first two volumes of the series will receive early entry forms for tickets to attend the Hamatora Fes 2014.summer event which will screen exclusive special footage of the series' sequel, Re:␣Hamatora at the Pacifico Yokohama on July 13, 2014.

Avex Group (Japan)
Vol.	Episodes	Blu-ray / DVD artwork	Bonus disc	Release date	Ref.
1	1, 2, 3	Murasaki & Nice	Drama CD	April 25, 2014	
2	4, 5, 6	Birthday & Ratio	Drama CD	May 30, 2014	
3	7, 8, 9	Honey & Three	CD	July 25, 2014	
4	10, 11, 12	Art & Moral	CD	August 29, 2014	
