= Asu e =

Single by Galileo Galilei

from the album Portal
- B-side: "Punipuni Wan-chan"; "Marble"
- Released: November 30, 2011
- Recorded: 2011
- Genre: Pop rock, electropop
- Length: 5:16
- Label: SME Records
- Songwriter(s): Yuuki Ozaki, Fumito Iwai
- Producer(s): Galileo Galilei

Galileo Galilei singles chronology
"Sayonara Frontier" (2011)	"Asu e" (2011)	"Circle Game" (2013)

"Asu e" (明日へ; "To Tomorrow") is a song by Japanese band Galileo Galilei. It was used as the first opening theme song for the anime Mobile Suit Gundam AGE, and was released as their sixth physical single on December 7, 2011.

== Background and development ==
After the release of their first full-length album Parade in February 2011, Galilei Galilei performed their first one-man live concerts. In spring, the band moved into a single house in Sapporo, creating a private studio in their home to create music. The band released a single in June, "Aoi Shiori", which served as the opening theme song for the anime Anohana: The Flower We Saw That Day, and is currently their only single to be certified gold by the RIAJ. In September the band released "Sayonara Frontier", co-composed by band bassist Hitoshi Sakō, and used as the theme song for the TV drama adaptation of Arakawa Under the Bridge.

== Writing and production ==
All members created the music together, with the lyrics and melody added in the final stages. Yuuki Ozaki and Fumito Iwai wrote the melody together, while Ozaki wrote the lyrics by himself. The song featured many more synthesizers, created mostly by Iwai, than previous Galileo Galilei songs. This was his first time creating a song with synthesizers instead of on the guitar. After the release of "Sayonara Frontier", the band took a long time experimenting and recording "Asu e". When the anime's opening theme song was discussed, the band picked what they considered the best-suited piece of music.

== Promotion and release ==
The song was first announced as the Mobile Suit Gundam AGE opening theme on September 25, 2011. To promote the single, the band gave interviews for magazines such as What's In?, B-Pass, Rockin' On Japan, Pati Pati, and Barfout! in November.

A music video was produced, and directed by Hideaki Fukui. It was first unveiled on November 19. It depicts the band performing the song in a large, cluttered garage.

Soon after the release of the single, synthesiser player Kazumasa Noguchi was announced as an official member of the band.

== Critical reception ==
CDJournal reviewers gave the single a star for recommendation, praising the richness of the song's arrangement, and felt that "Punipuni Wan-chan" was reminiscent of Daft Punk. Kazuhiro "Scao" Ikeda of EMTG was surprised with the band's sound on "Asu e", calling it a "funky, danceable song" influenced by afro-funk that was refreshing, candid, soulful, and deep. he praised the song's "funky cleartone guitar" and "groovy bassline", as well as the chorus' feelings of "rising" and "openness".

== Track listing ==
All lyrics are written by Yuuki Ozaki.

No.	Title	Music	Length
1.	"Asu e"	Yuuki Ozaki, Fumito Iwai	5:16
2.	"Punipuni Wan-chan" (ぷにぷにわんちゃん, "Squishy Doggy")	Galileo Galilei	1:48
3.	"Marble" (マーブル Māburu)	Galileo Galilei	4:12
Total length:			11:16

Limited edition bonus track
No.	Title	Music	Length
4.	"Asu e (TV Version)"	Ozaki, Iwai	1:30
Total length:			12:46

== Charts ==
Chart (2011)	Peak position
Japan Billboard Japan Hot 100	23
Japan Oricon weekly singles	17

=== Sales and certifications ===
Chart	Amount
Oricon physical sales	10,000

== Release history ==
Region	Date	Format	Distributing Label	Catalogue codes
Japan	November 2, 2011	Ringtone	SME Records	
Japan	November 30, 2011	Cellphone download	SME Records	
Japan	December 7, 2011	CD, limited edition CD, PC digital download	SME Records	SECL-1031, SECL-1032
Japan	December 24, 2011	Rental CD	SME Records	SECL-1031, SECL-1032
