= List of Re: Hamatora episodes =

- First home media release of Re:_Hamatora
- No. of episodes: 12

Release
- Original network: TV Tokyo
- Original release: July 8 – September 23, 2014

Season chronology
- ← Previous; Hamatora: The Animation

Re: Hamatora (Re: ␣ ハマトラ; stylized Re:␣Hamatora and pronounced "Reply Hamatora"), is a 2014 supernatural, mystery anime series based on the Japanese mixed-media project, Hamatora. It is set in the year 2014 where select humans called Minimum Holders have been discovered to possess supernatural abilities. The series is a direct sequel to Hamatora: The Animation and features the same main cast as the original one. Set three months after the events of The Animation, the story follows Minimum Holders known as Hamatora who solve cases.

The series was produced by Lerche, with NAZ (the first season's production company) credited for production assistance. Seiji Kishi is directing the series while Jun Kumagi is the main writer. Character designs are done by Yū Wazu, based on the original character designs by Blood Lad's Yūki Kodama along with art direction by Fantasista Utamaro. The project was composed by Yukinori Kitajima. The music is being composed by Makoto Yoshimori. The series premiered in Japan on July 8, 2014, and finished on September 23, 2014. The series was streamed on Crunchyroll during its first run. Animax UK also licensed the series to stream it on their official website.

People who purchased the first two volumes of the Hamatora: The Animation received early entry forms for tickets to attend the Hamatora Fes 2014.summer event which screened exclusive special footage of the series' sequel, Re:␣Hamatora at the Pacifico Yokohama on July 13, 2014. The series started collection in Blu-ray and DVD volumes on September 26, 2014.

The series uses two types of musical themes: an opening and an ending theme. The opening theme, "Sen no Tsubasa" (千の翼; lit. 'A Thousand Wings') is performed by the collaborative unit of Livetune adding Takuro Sugawara (from 9mm Parabellum Bullet) while Ayami, the voice of Hamatora's Chiyū, performs the ending theme, "Brand New World."

== Episode list ==
The Japanese episode titles were presented in English, and are numbered as "Re:01", "Re:02", and so forth.

No.	Title	Original release date
1	"Melancholy of Hero"	July 8, 2014
The people from the detective agency based in the Nowhere Café in Yokohama mourn the death of their comrade Nice said to have perished during riots three months ago. When a client arrives to request a job involving a stalker, Hajime decides to replace Nice and forms the Hamatora Mark II alongside Murasaki. Hajime and Murasaki's job is interrupted by Hikaru, a Minimum Holder who soon becomes a celebrity. When the Hamatora Mark II receives a murder request from a client, they instead become bodyguards of Hikaru through his producer. Hajime and Murasaki learn that Hikaru has attracted several girls but is unwilling to accept or reject them. One night, Hikaru allows himself to be the victim of the girl who wants him dead but she is stopped by Murasaki. The girl brings a group of thugs jealous of Hikaru; Hajime and Murasaki start fighting them. They are aided by Nice who is revealed to have been alive and has learned that the producer wanted Hikaru dead. After defeating the enemies, Nice is welcomed back in Nowhere Café by his friends who stop pretending he is dead. Murasaki then asks Nice why did he reveal himself which he responds is due to somebody's actions. Elsewhere, Hikaru is found by Art.
2	"Art Returns"	July 15, 2014
In Nowhere Café Nice and his friends remember how three months ago Art tried killing Nice, shooting him twice in the body but Murasaki escaped with him. Ratio and Birthday go in the search of their friend Chiyu who disappeared three months ago. They eventually find a club named Freemium full of Minimum Holders and Chiyu has been hiding there. Elsewhere, Nice and Murasaki contact officer Gasquet and learn Hikaru has been wounded and is resting in the hospital. Art then goes to the Minimum Holder academy Facultas, entering by force. Nice and his friends chase after Art who attacks a group of students, calling their abilities a sin. Art is confronted by Facultas' tutor Paper who uses his Minimum to deal mortal wounds on him. As Art appears to be killed, his own Minimum is activated and restores his health. He then uses Hikaru's Minimum to trick Paper and steal his own Minimum. Art then leaves the area much to Nice's confusion.
3	"Madness Flower"	July 22, 2014
Art faces a samurai who possesses the Wind Minimum and steals his powers. Meanwhile, in Nowhere Cafe the Hamatora and their friends reflect on how Art's victims are behaving optimistically as if things improved without their Minimums. Nice compares this being lighter after losing a wallet and remembers how back in Facultas he told Art he wanted to use his money to live a free life. Later that night, Gasquet has a Minimum Holder, Samura, whose works of art force its victims commit murders. Gasquet has to send him to another prison but on their way they are stopped by people discriminating the Minimum Holders. The Minimum Holder then leaves Gasquet's car with a painting covering his half-naked body that influences the group of people. Nice and his friends prepare to stop the face as Honey predicts the arrival of Art but suddenly suffers amnesia. When Art appears, he covers Samura in water to stop his powers and confronts Nice. Murasaki, Birthday and Ratio interfere forcing him to retreat. Later, Gasquet's new partner is revealed to be a traitor who leaked Samura to an unknown party simply referred as Saikyo.
4	"For Whom Talent"	July 29, 2014
In his hideout, Art kills himself so that his Minimum would generate his body alongside his life. Meanwhile, Honey is told by her comrades how she lost her senses in the previous night when using her Minimum. Not believing it, she uses her powers, causing her to act like a child again as an apparent side effect. Honey later receives a bodyguard request from her father, Doktor, a consultant to the Minimum Agency's medical department who has been pursuing stray Holders. Doktor later cancels the job and an angered Honey remembers how her father aimed to use her powers for assassination jobs. Concerned with Doktor's plans regarding Holders, the people from Freemium kidnap him alongside his daughter. Three receives an alert from his partner and goes to find her with Nice, Murasaki and Hajime. Eventually, Honey uses her Minimum to send Three her future location at the cost of regressing again. Three activates his own powers and saves both Honey and Doktor before their car is destroyed. Meanwhile, BIrthday and Ratio finish his respective jobs but both experiences side effects regarding his Minimum. Finally, Nice, Murasaki and Hajime are given the culprit's location but they are intercepted by Art.
5	"Buddy's Wishes"	August 5, 2014
Nice tries to confront Art but sideffects of his Minimum leave him unable to fight. Art then escapes with Freemum to their club to discuss an alliance with them. Art plans to become their leader and help them reach freedom and in compensation he requires their help. Meanwhile, Gasquet contacts Ratio and Birthday who also started suffering sideeffects. Three also starts losing control on his own body. Gasquet tries gathering information about Saikyo and he learns about an incident from three years ago involving Minimum Holders from Facultas and its connection with Saikyo. While being filmed by Birthday for a job, Murasaki's body is also briefly weakened. He warns Nice about the issues within their bodies. Art and Freenum attack a prison full of Minimum Holders but are confronted by Gasquet. The Holders from Freenum overwhelm the policeman as Nice and Murasaki reach the building. When Gasquet dies in front of Hamatora wondering why Art did not trust him, Nice swears he will stop Art.
6	"Advent"	August 12, 2014
After Gasquet's funeral Nice and his friends start investigating who attacked the prison of Minimum Holders and find his killer. Nice and Murasaki meet local information broker Mao who informs them how Gasquet contacted him to request him information about Saikyo. Although the culprits managed remove evidence of them, the group manage to find a video involving the members from Freenum. They try going to the club to confront them but learn they have already left. As Nice leaves Murasaki, Murasaki has an internal conflict as he admits detesting his own weakness for being always with Nice. He is then approached by Art and Murasaki claims he wants to join him. In Art's hideout, Art realizes Murasaki is just using him to aid Nice and allows Murasaki to beat him up while Freenum records and leak the scene. When Murasaki shoots Art, Freenum's Ishigami Shunichi activates Art's Regeneration Minimum revealing him to the public as a messiah-like figure. Hours later, Nice and Hajime find a bag with Murasaki inside.
7	"Emergency Room 24 Hours"	August 19, 2014
After realizing Murasaki is still alive, Nowhere's Master calls for an ambulance so that he will be treated. Murasaki manages to recover but it is revealed he has lost his Minimum ability. Birthday, Hajime, Koneko try conforting Murasaki but end up leaving him with more wounds when accidentally throwing him from his bed and Birthday tries reviving him with electricity. Later, Theo and Rei arrive bringing new glasses to him but end up causing more problems. Honey and Three bring weaponry so that he will compensate for his lack of Minimum. Meanwhile, the people from Freenum appear in the hospital for unknown reasons. When leaving Murasaki, Honey, Three, Koneko and Birthday get lost and become tormented due to a possible ghost. They are saved by Master who reveals the "ghost" are actually the former Minimum Holders Art attacked. Nice later arrives to the hospital, bringing Murasaki his own food to have but ends up throwing him from his bed like the other people. In the epilogue, Moral's former assistant Momoka approaches Hajime.
8	"Worst Promise & Best Memory"	August 26, 2014
Momoka invites Hajime to her limousine under the promise she knows about her forgotten past. Nice becomes nervous when deducing Hajime left with Momoka and decides to search for her. Momoka explains to Hajime that she has a power that nullyfies Minimums which resulted in Murasaki being her first victim and the rest suffering from sideffect. Momoka guides Hajime to a basement where she is attacked by berserker people whose musculature was increased. Hajime recognizes them as test experiments performed by Facultas. Hajime was the only one who was not affected by the experiments and remained locked in a cell until a young Nice met her. Upon realizing Hajime's state, Nice invited her to the outside world. After the flashback, Koneko leaks Hajime's location to Nice who goes to search for her alongside his friends. Hajime then remembers how during her escape from Facultas Nice was shot which causes her to unleash her berserker Minimum. Art identifies it as the Nihilist Minimum capable of eradicating other Minimums just as Nice comes to retrieve her.
9	"Symphony in the Moonlight"	September 2, 2014
In the Minimum Agency, Doktor becomes concerned with Freemum's actions and states his desire to control Minimum Holders. Meanwhile, all the subjects held in the basement where Hajime was located are being transferred to a hospital. Honey and Three then go to Nowhere Cafe to hire Nice and the rest as actors for The Tale of the Bamboo Cutter to help Three's orphans. Hajime is given the role of Princess Kaguya while the rest aim to take the other leading role. Ratio, Birthday, Murasaki fail the role while Nice only makes her smile. Meanwhile, the members from Freemum aim to make Art an idol for Minimum Holders and make Yokohama their own territory. At the same time, Doktor aims to murder all Minimum Holder causing riot. Later, Three gets the role of taking Kaguya away by default for the play. However, this reminds Nice of Hajime's past in Facultas causing him to improvise and take her hand much to everybody's joy. Later, as Birthday and Ratio reflect on Nice's change of attitude, the former starts suffering symptoms from his illness that once almost killed him. In the epilogue Nice finds a letter from Hajime directed at him.
10	"For whom to Duel"	September 9, 2014
Nice and his friends are shocked to read Hajime's farewell card to him and go to search for her. At the same time, Ratio continues searching a Holder able to heal Birthday who has been hospitalized. He discovers Chiyu in a car and takes her to the hospital, having realized she lost her Minimum. Nice and Murasaki are contacted by Momoka through phone and are led to a bomb set to explode alongside a person precious to them. While Nice and Murasaki stop the bomb, the person they save is Master. Momoka then shows them two other hostages: Koneko who is in Nowhere and Hajime who is with the Freemum. Nice and Murasaki split to search for their friends. Nice encounters Ratio whose objective, the healing Holder, is in the hands of Freemum. Momoka has Nice and Ratio fight each other with the winner being promised to get their objective. Although Nice defeats Ratio, he is unable to kill him and the Momoka leaves the Holders alone just as Murasaki reaches them. Freemum then moves to another location alongside Hajime.
11	"End of Yokohama"	September 16, 2014
In a flashback, a young Nice talks with Art and Art's younger brother, Skill, about their wish to see Yokohama from a specific building. Back in the present, Nice and Murasaki contact Master to ask how he knew where Hajime had been held before. Master reveals he is a former member of the Minimum Agency (along with Moral and Doktor) who saw Hajime as too dangerous to be alive due to her powers. Master promised to take care of her and left the group with another test subject, Koneko. Meanwhile, Freemum starts a coup d'état to overtake Yokohama. Ishigami and his allies confront the Minimum Agency led by Doktor. Although Ishigami's allies take the upper hand, Honey and Three intervene to stop the fight. Just as Freemum remains victorious, Art starts killing most of them until he finishes Ishigami, as he was just using them to gather more Minimum Holders. Momoka then releases Hajime who goes to see Nice. Nice and Murasaki try to confront Art, but Nice's Minimum deteriorates his body again. Art then stabs Nice in order to shock Hajime and trigger her Nihilist Minimum. This time Hajime's Minimum covers a wide area in Yokohama and Art starts crying in relief as he finally reached his objective.
12	"Resolution (Ego)"	September 23, 2014
The episode begins in a flashback showing Nice, Art and Skill's time in Facultas. When Skill was confirmed to have the potential to develop a Minimum, he was not seen by his friends. Art discovers that Facultas was forcing Skill to use his Minimum to make others receive Minimums regardless of what happened to others. As a result, Skill begged his brother to kill him which he did in shock. Art lost the memories of that event until being nearly killed by Moral who transplanted Skill's heart to Nice. Momoka then revealed this to Art resulting in Art making the promise to rid the world of all Minimums. The episode then moves to the present where Momoka kills herself bored with the world. Nice is revealed to have survived Art's attack. He faces Art in rage because of what he did to Hajime. In the middle of the battle, Skill's Ego Minimum appears to restore everybody's Minimum. After being defeated, Art jumps from the building in order to kill himself. Six months later, Nice, Murasaki and Hajime visit Skill's grave and are approached by Art. Nice and Hajime reconcile with him by punching him. In the epilogue, Nice and his friends celebrate Art's return to Nowhere.

== Home media ==
Avex Group (Japan)
Vol.	Episodes	Blu-ray / DVD artwork	Bonus disc	Release date	Ref.
1	1, 2, 3		Drama CD	September 26, 2014	
2	4, 5, 6		Drama CD	October 31, 2014	
3	7, 8, 9		CD	November 28, 2014	
4	10, 11, 12		CD	December 28, 2014	
