= Newtown (EP) =

EP by Folks
- Released: February 12, 2014
- Recorded: 2013
- Genre: Indie rock, indie pop, shoegazing, electropop
- Length: 32:56
- Language: Japanese
- Label: Ki/oon Music
- Producer: Folks

Folks chronology
Take Off (2013)	Newtown (2014)

Newtown is the second extended play by the Japanese band Folks, released on February 12, 2014. It was the band's first major label release under Ki/oon Music.

== Writing and production ==
Newtown was recorded in Sapporo at Hit Studio and Geimori Studio in 2013. The album has four of the five songs on Take Off, along with three new compositions. Fumito Iwai is the main songwriter and vocalist for the album, writing every track except "River", which was written and sung by Katsutoshi Iwai. "Good-bye, Friends" was composed by all members of Folks, with lyrics written by Fumito Iwai. Their self-produced 2012 extended play Take Off was produced and arranged by Fumito Iwai alone. After performing the album live for a year, it began to feel like their own album as well and not just Fumito Iwai's. On Newtown, all the members contributed to the arrangement and production. The arrangements of Take Off songs were changed after the band performed them in front of live audiences. Fumito Iwai had never considered how songs would sound live, so experimented by changed their percussion balance and tempo, and created live arrangements for them.

Work on Newtown started several months after their first live concert in April 2013, as the members created ideas and discussed what they wanted to do together as Folks. The style of French indie rock band Phoenix's album, Wolfgang Amadeus Phoenix (2009), influenced thm greatly and they sought to use some of the techniques Phoenix used.

"Replica", a song about the end of summer in Hokkaido, was written in summer 2012 by Fumito Iwai. It was the first song he worked on after leaving Galileo Galilei, and expressed the sort of music he wanted to create. The first song recorded for the Newtown sessions was "Forever"."Everything Is Alone" was described as having an "updated funk sound" by Fumito Iwai, and was a mix of everything the band members wanted to express in a song. They had difficulty in arranging and tuning the drums, as they had not worked with live drums in a recording before.

"Gaga" from Take Off was re-titled "You're Right" for Newtown. Fumito Iwai felt the main association of the word was the American musician Lady Gaga, and changed it as he felt that too limiting."Two Young" had not been performed live by Folks before Newtown's release, but was written to be performed live. "Good-bye, Friends" was based on a demo Katsutoshi Iwai had made and Noguchi expanded on. However, the song was created by all of the members of the band, discussing and experimenting together.

After Newtown was recorded, Fumito Iwai and Yoshitomo Kobayash went to Tokyo to oversee its mixing. Tatsuki Masuko, a member of the Japanese instrumental band Rovo, helped to mix and master Newtown, unlike Take Off, which Fumito Iwai mixed alone.

The title Newtown refers to the planned community of Megumino in Eniwa, which is a motif of the release. The cover and artist promotional photos were taken in Eniwa by the photographer Yoshiharu Ota, as well as the music video for "Everything Is Alone". The video was shot at the members' homes in Megumino.

== Promotion and release ==
"Everything Is Alone" was the first song promoting the album. It was released to radio stations; its music video was a power play video on the music video station Space Shower TV in January 2014. The song received minor requests to radio stations on a national level in January 2014, however was extremely popular in Hokkaido, being the number one requested song at radio stations for January 2014. The song peaked at number 81 on the Billboard Adult Contemporary Airplay Chart. The song was chosen as the February ending theme song for the Nagoya radio station Zip-FM's Spice Up weekend morning radio show.

The band performed their first live show outside of Hokkaido at the Tokyo Tsutaya O-West on January 20, 2014. The band held their first live show in Eniwa just after the EP's release, on February 15, 2014, at the Eniwa Musōkan, where Fumito Iwai's high school band Guild first performed.

To promote the album, Folks appeared on many Hokkaido-based radio stations such as FM North Wave, Air-G', STV Radio and HBC Radio. They were also interviewed for music magazine Musica.

== Critical reception ==
Critical reception to Newtown was positive. Akihiro Okumura from What's In? was impressed with the "overseas resonance" of the band, likening Folks to indie rock musicians like Passion Pit and Mumford and Sons, as well as having the approach of James Blake. Okumura was very impressed by the "lyrical vocal lines" of Fumito Iwai and Kazutoshi Iwai, and likened them to the 1980s city pop movement in Japanese music. Saori Kishiba, a reviewer for Skream!, likened the band to Animal Collective and Arcade Fire, praising the "dreamy pop sound" and polished arrangements of songs on Newtown. CDJournal reviewers felt the EP made the listener feel the "transparent feeling and pathos" of Northern European rock, while having a post-rock base. The reviewers praised the "beauty of fusion" in the album's "pleasant songs", and wrote that their harmonies "reminded you of an aurora".

In March 2015, Folks' extended play Newtown was awarded the best Hokkaido-region artist award at the 7th CD Shop Awards.

== Track listing ==
No.	Title	Writer(s)	Length
1.	"Everything Is Alone"	Fumito Iwai	4:18
2.	"Two Young"	Fumito Iwai	4:15
3.	"Forever"	Fumito Iwai	4:26
4.	"Good-bye, Friends"	Fumito Iwai, Folks	5:23
5.	"River"	Katsutoshi Iwai	4:24
6.	"You're Right"	Fumito Iwai	5:05
7.	"Replica"	Fumito Iwai	4:44
Total length:			32:56

== Charts ==
Chart (2014)	Peak position
Japan Oricon weekly albums	81

== Sales and certifications ==
Chart	Amount
Oricon physical sales	800

== Personnel ==
Personnel details were sourced from Newtown's liner notes booklet.

Folks

- All members – arrangement, production
- Yoshitomo Kobayashi – guitar, synthesizer, percussion, chorus
- Fumito Iwai – vocals (#1–4, #6–7), guitar
- Katsutoshi Iwai – guitar, vocals (#5)
- Kazumasa Noguchi – bass, chorus
- Masatsugu Takahashi – programming, synthesizer, chorus

Technical, production and imagery

- Yuri Furukawa – A&R chief
- Noriyuki Kikuchi – A&R
- Kenichi Koga – recording engineer at Geimori Studio (#1, No. 3, #5–7)
- Tatsuki Masuko – mixing, mastering
- Yoshiharu Ota – art direction, photography
- Naonori Sakamoto – assistant recording engineer at Geimori Studio (#1, No. 3, #5–7)
- Hirano Tanaka – art direction, design
- Naoya Tsubakihara – support drum, drum technician
- Hirokazu Tsuruha – recording engineer at Hit Studio

== Release history ==
Region	Date	Format	Distributing Label	Catalogue codes
Japan	February 12, 2014	CD, digital download	Ki/oon Music	KSCL-2354
Japan	March 1, 2014	Rental CD	Ki/oon Music	KSCL-2354
