= Take Off (Folks EP) =

EP by Folks
- Released: March 29, 2013
- Recorded: 2012–2013
- Genre: Indie rock, indie pop, shoegazing
- Length: 20:30
- Language: Japanese
- Producer: Folks

Folks chronology
| Take Off (2013) | Newtown (2014) |

Take Off is the first extended play by Japanese band Folks, independently released on March 29, 2013. It was the band's first release, and their only self-issued album before their major label debut under Ki/oon Music in 2014.

== Background and development ==
Folks first formed in 2013 when former Galileo Galilei members Fumito Iwai and Kazumasa Noguchi moved back to their birthplace of Hokkaido to start a band, and officially became a unit in January 2013. Iwai and Noguchi asked former Guild member Yoshitomo Kobayashi to join their band, and they moved to Sapporo, renting a house with Iwai's older brother Katsutoshi Iwai and his friend Masatsugu Takahashi, who also had a separate band. All five people practised music in their own rooms, but because Katsutoshi Iwai's room was a Japanese style room, the other band members could hear him through the thin shōji walls. In late 2013, Fumito Iwai heard his brother creating the song "River," and liked it so much he asked to arrange the song. All the house-mates loved the completed song, and decided to merge their two bands to create Folks.

== Writing and production ==
Take Off was recorded from Summer 2012, when Folks was a three-member unit, until March 2013. The majority of the extended play features songs written by Fumito Iwai and featuring vocals by him, except the song "River," which was written and sung by Katsutoshi Iwai. Fumito Iwai mixed, arranged and produced Take Off by himself. The band based themselves at their parents' houses in Eniwa, Hokkaido, and recorded songs in Fumito Iwai's bedroom in Megumino.

Iwai felt that Take Off was influenced by Oasis, and other English indie rock musicians such as James Blake and Bombay Bicycle Club. he felt the lyrics were influenced by Galileo Galilei vocalist Yūki Ozaki's lyrical style, and by Galileo Galilei's music in general.

For the July 2013 iTunes release of the album, Take Off was remastered by Yoshinori Sunahara.

All songs, except the intro "Take Off" were later used for their major label debut extended play Newtown (2014), including the song "Gaga" which was retitled "You're Right."

== Promotion and release ==
The album was first released on March 29, 2013 to download service Vibirth. On April 6, 2013 at Sound Lab Mole in Sapporo, Folks held the album release party live, and also sold physical copies of the album there.

The physical version was released at Sapporo music store Ongaku Dokoro in July 2013, and later at Hokkaido music chain Gyokkodo on October 8, 2013. The extended play was released globally on iTunes on July 31, 2013.

The band made their first festival performance, at the Rising Sun Rock Festival, on August 17, 2013. They held their first radio interview on local Eniwa radio station E-niwa on August 30, 2013.

== Track listing ==
| No. | Title | Writer(s) | Length |
|---|---|---|---|
| 1. | "Take Off" | Folks | 1:01 |
| 2. | "Replica (Take Off Mix)" | Fumito Iwai | 5:07 |
| 3. | "Forever" | Fumito Iwai | 4:28 |
| 4. | "River" | Katsutoshi Iwai | 4:23 |
| 5. | "Gaga (Take Off Mix)" | Fumito Iwai | 5:31 |
| Total length: | | | 20:30 |

== Release history ==
| Region | Date | Format |
|---|---|---|
| Japan | March 29, 2013 | Digital download (Vibirth exclusive) |
| Japan | April 6, 2013 | CD (live concert exclusive) |
| Japan | July 17, 2013 | CD (Ongaku Dokoro release) |
| Worldwide | July 31, 2013 | Digital download |
| Japan | October 7, 2013 | CD (Gyokkodo exclusive) |
