= Mobile Suit Gundam: Extreme VS Force =

2015 video game

Mobile Suit Gundam: Extreme VS-Force
- Japanese version cover art
- Developers: Bandai Namco Studios; Lancarse
- Publisher: Bandai Namco Entertainment
- Platform: PlayStation Vita
- Release: JP: 23 December 2015; NA: 12 July 2016; EU: 12 July 2016
- Genre: Fighting
- Modes: Single-player, Multiplayer

Mobile Suit Gundam Extreme VS-Force is a portable spin-off of the Extreme Vs. series, developed by Bandai Namco Studios and Lancarse for PlayStation Vita.

The game was initially released on 23 December 2015 in Japan, while localized Chinese and English editions were released in Asia during the following year in January and February respectively. On 12 July 2016, it was released in North America, Europe, Africa, Australasia, and the Middle East as a digital-only title on the PlayStation Network, and includes all DLC and updates from its Japanese version. The theme song is titled "Inherit the Force", performed by T.M.Revolution.

== Gameplay ==
The game plays similarly to the Extreme VS series, but with a greater focus on squad-based gameplay. While the classic 2 vs 2 format is retained along with many of the gameplay mechanics of the Extreme VS series, players can be able to assemble their own team of mobile suits and mobile armors along with a flagship for a 6vs6 battle. Due to the hardware limitations of the PS Vita, the EX Mode has been removed while some attacks were reworked such as Exia's Trans-AM being activated when the machine's armor has been reduced to a critical level or in other cases, removed altogether like Assists for some mobile suits.

Extreme Force mode acts as this game's version of the previous titles' Trial Mode/Full Boost Mission, though this time it strictly recounts the events of Universal Century. Completing missions rewards GP, which can be used to repair units or grant passive bonuses. Clearing certain missions will also unlock additional mobile suits to pilot. In some cases, Mobile Armors and mass-produced suits can be unlocked, though these can only be used by the CPU.

There are two types of missions: Force and VS. Force focuses on objective-based missions and features a squad mechanic. Players can assign orders to their teammates or a warship to advance to certain points on the map. Usually in order to turn the tide of the battle, the player must capture posts which are done by destroying the marked turret. From that point, units can respawn at that point as well as summon "minions" to advance to other posts. As time passes and enemies are destroyed, Force Points are acquired, which can be used during a level to activate supplementary bonuses like increased attack power or respawning much quicker. Most bonuses also have a level requirement and cannot be used until leveled up sufficiently. If a warship is available, and if leveled up high enough with enough FP, then a Force Attack unlocks which involves the ship directing a barrage of fire at opposing warships or ace units.

Rather than a resource gauge, Force missions are completed by fulfilling an objective such as destroying a specific unit or an allied unit reaching a specified point. The player can respawn as many times as need be. VS missions on the other hand, follow the traditional format of Gundam VS games by depleting the enemy's resource gauge through defeating enemies.

By fulfilling certain criteria, Haro Medals can also be obtained. By collecting enough, additional missions will be unlocked along with increasing the resource cost limit. Green missions, which are identified as irregularities, focus on missions outside of Universal Century, allowing the player to unlock mobile suits from alternate universes.

Initially, the game came with only one single player offline mode in Extreme Force, but following later updates, a VS Extend mode was added to include the standard Free Battle and Course Battle modes. Free Battle in particular allows players to freely assign mobile armors and other NPC units to the CPU slots. Playing through Course Battle allows for players to farm for GP.

== Plot ==
The game's story is contained within the game's Extreme Force mode, which is a prequel to the events of Gundam EXA. The story revolves around the "Project Force" plan, which was put into motion to help humanity evolve and avoid utter annihilation after observing the events of the Universal Century. To do this, two virtual combat simulators, Aire and Tereno, create a human personality from the database AI to dive into the virtual recreations of Universal Century, link up with various pilots from across the timelines and evolve in hopes of discovering a way to save humanity from the brink of destruction.

As the player progresses, irregularities begin appearing, endangering the project. It is soon revealed that these irregularities were in fact created by the control program of the Project itself, revealing its intent through hijacking Aire and Tereno. In order to, on its own terms based on accumulated data, speed up the evolution of humanity, it created conflict through these irregularities, believing evolution to be born through despair. It then gives the player a choice to choose either Aire or Tereno to give it the power and data needed to move forward with its plan while destroying the other. Eventually, the player ends up gathering the fragments of either girl and restores them to normal. Discovering that Project Force is to "evolve" humanity through war, Aire, Tereno and the player resolve to stop the project and protect mankind, even knowing that the plan to help evolve humans to avoid extinction could very well endanger everyone.

As the player and the navigators progress to the control program, it builds up various defenses based on data of Universal Century's most powerful weapons. Eventually, they reach Earth 0's core, which is shown to be Extreme Universe. After a harrowing fight involving waves of duplicates of Universal Century's villains and a final showdown with the NZ-999 Neo Zeong, they succeed in defeating the control program. However, before the program perishes from the processor, it initiates a last ditch effort to force humanity as initiates a self-destruct sequence in Earth 0's orbital station to attempt its own "colony drop". With little to no time left, Aire and Tereno attempt to join and become the new Control Program and stop the station from dropping, sacrificing their own identities in the progress to save the player.

Before Aire fades away, she bestows the player with a name and hopes that one day they'll save mankind, giving them the name—extra--. Soon after this, the protagonist's thoughts are finally heard as he soon comes to with fragmented memories. Surrounded by the warmth of the memories of his friends, he tries to call out his own name: ex-.

== Development ==
The Gundam Versus games were originally arcade releases, and each arcade iteration of the Gundam Versus series would receive eventually receive PS3 versions. Mobile Suit Gundam: Extreme VS Force is an exception in that regard; not only it is less of a direct port of the then-current arcade version, it is also the first Gundam game since Mobile Suit Gundam: Crossfire to see an English-language release in nearly a decade. Each new entry moved along the timeline to include mobile suits from that era of the narrative; recent titles have moved closer to the classic Virtual On games in terms of gameplay, where the rulesets were far stricter and taut dash mechanics are standard.

In December 2015 Bandai Namco Entertainment released a trailer highlighting much of what the game would have to offer, such as a conquest type mode where players would give commands to their allies while also defending the player's battleship. The objective being to destroy the enemy's battleship before they do the same to the player's battleship. The battleships can also receive commands and also contribute to the fight.

The game is compatible with the PlayStation TV (known as the PlayStation Vita TV in Japan).

=== Marketing ===
Special collaboration models of the PlayStation Vita and PlayStation TV were released as limited edition tie-in bundles. The PlayStation Vita models featured laser-etched designs depicting the RX-78-2 Gundam (from the first Mobile Suit Gundam anime series) and the RX-0 Unicorn Gundam (from the Mobile Suit Gundam Unicorn anime), and come in both Glacier White and Black colors. The PlayStation TV model will feature a similar laser-etched design, but is only available in Glacier White. Aside from the PS Vita/PS TV models themselves, the bundles include the Mobile Suit Gundam: Extreme VS-Force game, custom menu themes, and a box featuring the design from the models.

== Reception ==
Reception

Aggregate score
Aggregator	Score
Metacritic	57/100

Review scores
Publication	Score
Eurogamer	7/10
GameRevolution	2/5
Forbes	7/10
Push Square	5/10
Hardcore Gamer	2.5/5

Mobile Suit Gundam: Extreme VS Force received mixed reviews according to review aggregator Metacritic.

Game Revolution's Matthew Utley felt the game had plenty of content with short levels suitable for portable play, but saw the story as needlessly complicated. He criticized the game's graphics, controls, dull combat, and difficulty. Forbes' Ollie Barder was of the view that while the game is good in its own right, he felt that it is not the appropriate Mobile Suit Gundam title for Western gamers who are unfamiliar with the series to experience for the first time. Robert Ramsey of Push Square thought Extreme VS Force was best when sticking to two-on-two battles, which worked well with the combat system, but found the game often used large chaotic group battles, and that boss fights were boring. Hardcore Gamer's review, by Jason Bohn, noted the early missions in the game had good pacing and left a good impression, but as the game progresses issues become more apparent. Bohn recommended against multiplayer except for the most dedicated Gundam fans. Eurogamer.it saw the game as a good production that used the PS Vita's hardware well, but also recommended the game only for its single player mode, due to the game's lack of an online mode.
