= Yuuki Ozaki =

Japanese musician (born 1991)

- Born: May 27, 1991 (age 35); Wakkanai, Hokkaido, Japan
- Origin: Japan
- Genres: Rock, pop
- Occupations: Singer, songwriter, guitarist
- Instruments: Vocals, guitar
- Years active: 2007–present
- Label: SME Records
- Website: http://www.warbear.jp/

Yuuki Ozaki (尾崎雄貴, Ozaki Yūki; born May 27, 1991), is a Japanese musician, best known as the leading vocalist and songwriter for the bands Galileo Galilei and BBHF. He also performs under his solo project warbear. In 2014, he began releasing solo material. He announced his new band "Bird Bear Hare and Fish" (renamed BBHF in 2019) during his solo concert on January 27. He released his first full length solo album "warbear" in December 2017.

== Biography ==
Yuuki Ozaki was born in Wakkanai, Hokkaido in 1991. At junior high school in 2007, he formed the band Galileo Galilei, and in 2008 won the Senkō Riot music contest, as well as an independent music contract. After releasing the extended play Ame Nochi Galileo (2009), the band made their major label debut under SME Records with the EP Hamanasu no Hana (2010). As a member of Galileo Galilei, he has released seven albums: Parade (2011), Portal (2012), Alarms (2013), Sea and the Darkness (2016), Bee and The Whales (2023), Manster (2024), and Mantral (2024).

Ozaki collaborated with Vocaloid producer Livetune to create the opening theme song for the anime Hamatora, "Flat", which was released in early 2014. In mid 2014, Ozaki collaborated with anime composer Yoko Kanno to create "Trigger", the opening theme song for the anime Terror in Resonance. Ozaki with his band frequently collaborate with Aimer, the singer who performed the ending theme song for the anime, where she provides vocal for "Bananafish Hamabe to Kuroi Niiji" in their fourth EP See More Glass and "Bed" in their fourth full-length album Sea and the Darkness. Ozaki was featured on the song "Nemuri no Mori", from his extended play Dareka, Umi o, Yuuki later announced while he was on tour that he is in a new band called Bird Bear Hare and Fish.

== Discography ==
Albums

Title	Album details
warbear	Released: December 6, 2017; Label: SME Records; Formats: CD, digital download

=== Singles ===
List of singles, with selected chart positions
Title	Year	Peak chart positions		Sales (JPN) (Note: Sales provided by Oricon database and are rounded to the nearest thousand copies.)	Album
Title	Year	Oricon Singles Charts	Billboard Japan Hot 100 (Note: Sources for chart positions are as follows: "Trigger".)	Sales (JPN)	Album
"Flat" (Livetune adding Yuuki Ozaki from Galileo Galilei)	2014	48	— (Note: Charted at number 49 on the Hot Singles Sales Chart.)	3,000	To
"Trigger"	2014	46	59	6,000	Non-album single
