= Galileo Galilei (band) =

Japanese indie rock band

- Origin: Wakkanai, Hokkaido, Japan
- Genres: Indie rock, indie pop, electropop
- Years active: 2007–2016, 2022–present
- Labels: Ouchi Daisuki Club; SME Records
- Members: Yuuki Ozaki; Fumito Iwai; Kazuki Ozaki; Masaki Okazaki; DAIKI
- Past members: Sohei Funaya; Hitoshi Sako; Kazumasa Noguchi
- Website: galileogalilei.jp

Galileo Galilei (ガリレオ・ガリレイ) is a Japanese indie rock band from Wakkanai, Hokkaido who debuted in 2008 after winning the teenage audition festival “Senkou Riot”. In 2009, The band signed with SME Records and released their debut song “Hamanasu no Hana” the next year which marked over 1 million downloads. Their debut studio album, Parade was released in 2011 which reached the top 5 on the Oricon weekly chart, followed by their second studio album Portal in 2012.

Their music has been featured as the theme song for various anime, such as "Aoi Shiori" (青い栞, Blue Bookmark) for Anohana, "Asu e" (明日へ, "To Tomorrow") for Mobile Suit Gundam AGE, Natsuzora (夏空) for Big Windup! Season 2 and "Climber" (クライマー) for Haikyu!! season 2.

== History ==
Galileo Galilei was formed in 2007 by singer and guitarist Yūki Ozaki, guitarist Sōhei Funaya, bassist Hitoshi Sakō, and drummer Kazuki Ozaki. In the following year, the band made its debut after winning the teenage audition festival called “Senkou Riot”. Galileo Galilei signed to SME Records with guitarist and backing vocalist Fumito Iwai joining the band in 2009 and keyboard player Kazumasa Noguchi joining in 2011. Galileo Galilei released the albums Parade in 2011 and Portal in 2012 which reached No. 5 and No. 10 respectively on the Japanese music charts. Iwai and Noguchi left Galileo Galilei in 2012 and later formed the group Folks in 2013. The 2011 film Control Tower, directed by Takahiro Miki, is based on the Galileo Galilei song of the same name. The feature premiered at the Japan Cuts. In September of that same year, they announced on their website that they will be performing the opening theme, "Asu e" for the sci-fi anime series Mobile Suit Gundam AGE. The band also provided the opening theme, "Aoi Shiori" (青い栞, Blue Bookmark) for anime Anohana.

On 27 June, 2013, it was announced that Galileo Galilei would be releasing a new single, "Circle Game," which will be the theme song for the movie version of the anime Anohana.

Galileo Galilei released their fifth album Sea and The Darkness in January 2016 and announced their breakup after their final tour in April 2016. The song "クライマー" (English: Climber) from their album Sea and The Darkness was featured as an end credit song in the second season of anime series Haikyu!!.

In 2018, members of Galileo Galilei along with a support guitarist DAIKI formed a new band called Bird Bear Hare and Fish.

The band announced that they were reforming at warbear's "re:bear" live concert that took place on October 11, 2022, after a six-year hiatus. The band released their sixth album Bee And The Whales on May 31, 2023, their first album in seven years. They Embarked on their A "Bee and The Whales" Zepp tour in June 2023.

On September 25, 2024, Galileo Galilei released two albums, Manster and Mantral simultaneously with 14 songs each.

== Members ==
- Yūki Ozaki (尾崎雄貴, Ozaki Yūki) – vocals, guitar, keyboards (2007–2016, 2022–present)
- Kazuki Ozaki (尾崎和樹, Ozaki Kazuki) – drums, percussion, backing vocals (2007–2016, 2022–present)
- Fumito Iwai (岩井郁人, Iwai Fumito) – guitar, backing vocals, keyboards (2009–2012, 2022–present)
- Masaki Okazaki (岡崎真輝, Okazaki Masaki) – bass (2022–present)
- DAIKI – guitar (2025–present; touring 2013–2016, 2023–2025)

=== Past members ===
- Hitoshi Sakō (佐孝仁司, Sakō Hitoshi) – bass, guitar (2007–2016)
- Sōhei Funaya (船谷創平, Funaya Sōhei) – guitar (2007–2009)
- Kazumasa Noguchi (野口一雅, Noguchi Kazumasa) – keyboards (2011–2012)

=== Live members ===
- Junya Ōkubo (大久保淳也, Ōkubo Junya) – saxophone, flute, keyboards (2023–present)
- Chima – backing vocals, keyboards, percussion (2013–2016; also session vocalist 2009–2016)

== Biography ==
=== Formation ===
In his third year of middle school, Yuuki Ozaki discovered an electric guitar in the closet while doing spring cleaning. From then on, he and his younger brother, Kazuki, would pretend to be in a band, playing air guitar together. As Yuuki began to practice seriously, he realized he wanted to start a band and invited his childhood friend Hitoshi Sakou to join. Having seen all the fun Yuuki was having for a while now, Hitoshi readily agreed to join, using his New Year's money to buy a beginner's guitar set for about 40,000 yen. At the time, they didn't know what a bass guitar was, so they adopted the twin guitar style seen in bands such as ASIAN KUNG-FU GENERATION and the pillows.

After a while, Yuuki learned about bass guitars in a music magazine, and asked Hitoshi if he could buy one. Thinking that any kind of instrument was fine as long as he could play in the band, Hitoshi agreed and bought it. Yuuki's little brother Kazuki received a hand-me-down drum set that had been used by his teacher's son and secretly practiced the drums while looking at a textbook, hiding what he was doing from Yuuki. One day, Yuuki discovered this, exclaiming, "You can play drums? I'll make you a support member!" and let Kazuki join the band. At the time, Kazuki did not really understand the meaning of "support member" and just thought of it as a way he could participate in the band. After that, Souhei Funaya joined and the group began writing original songs, officially forming the group Galileo Galilei in Wakkanai, Hokkaido in 2007.

On August 10, 2008, the band won the grand prize at the teenage audition festival "Senkou Riot." They attended the event again as the opening act in 2009. The following month, they opened for Young Flag 09 for their performance at Zepp Sapporo, which was also organized by "SCHOOL OF LOCK!"

On August 31st, band member Souhei announced on the official homepage that he would be departing from the band to "fulfill another dream." As a result of searching, Guild vocalist Fumito Iwai, who the group had met the previous year in the third round of auditions for Senkou Riot 2008, joined the band.

=== Major Debut ===
In 2010, the title song of their major debut mini-album "Hamasu no Hana" (ハマスの花, "Japanese Rose Flower") played on music specialty channels and FM radio stations nationwide. They were the youngest band selected to perform the advertising jingle for au by KDDI's "LISMO." From this year onwards, they also performed at events like "ROCK IN JAPAN FES" and "RUSH BALL."

In March, the "LISMO! Galileo Galilei Special Life" was held at the KDDI Designing Studio in Harajuku. There were around 10,000 applications for 100 available spots. On the day of the event, the standing room had an audience of around 500 people.

In June, they released their first single "Natsuzora" (夏空, "Summer Sky"). In September of the same year, they released their second single ""Yotsuba Sagashi no Tabibito" (四ツ葉さがしの旅人, "Four Leaf Searcher").

Released in November, the ringtone "Boku Kara Kimi E" (僕から君へ, "From Me to You") debuted at number one on the "RecoChoku Rock Song" daily chart (11/24). Their third single containing the ringtone was released the following year on January 19th.

On February 16, 2011, their first album "Parade" (パレード) was released. The band also performed a solo tour.

On June 15th, they released their fourth single "Aoi Shiori" (青い栞, "Blue Bookmark"). Shortly after, they released their fifth single "Sayonara Frontier" (さよならフロンティア, "Goodbye Frontier") on September 7th, and then their sixth single "Asu e" (明日へ, "To Tomorrow") on December 7th. Also in December, they announced the upcoming release of their second album "PORTAL," along with the official joining of Kazumasa Noguchi, who had been acting as a support member.

On January 25, 2012, they officially released their second album "PORTAL" and performed another solo tour. In February, the band-score for "PORTAL" and their first artist book was released.

On September 13th, it was announced on their official website that members Fumito Iwai and Kazumasa Noguchi would be leaving the band.

On October 31st, their mini album "Baby, It's Cold Outside" was released. Additionally, their first Ustream program "'Baby, It's Cold Outside' so 'Ouchi Daisuki Club'" was live streamed from Wanwan Studio.

On February 10, 2013, the band announced on their official website that they were looking to recruit support members. On the 22nd of the same month, their second Ustream program "Galileo Galilei Special Web Program" was live streamed from Wanwan Studio.

On August 21st, they released their seventh single "Circle Game" (サークルゲーム). In October, their third album "ALARMS" was released. They also held a solo tour.

In February of 2014, they held their first solo concert at Shibuya Public Hall. To commemorate this, they released a version of "Hellogoodbye," a remake of their indie song "Hello Goodbye" (ハローグッバイ).

On October 1st, the mini album "See More Glass" released. They also held their nationwide tour "Galileo Galilei 'landing balloon tour' 2014."

On March 11, 2015, they released their eighth single titled "Koi no Jumyō" (恋の寿命, "Limit of Love").

On June 10th, their 9th single "Arashi no Ato de" (嵐のあとで, "After the Storm") was released.

On October 17th, they started their nationwide tour "Galileo Galilei 'broken tower tour' 2015" with their first public performance in Sapporo.

On December 9th, they released their tenth single "Climber" (クライマー).

=== Disbandment ===
In January 2016, the band announced that they would cease activity following their nationwide solo live tour "Galileo Galilei 'Sea and The Darkness' Tour 2016," which would run from March to April. Their final album as a band titled "Sea and The Darkness" would release on January 27th.

On June 15th, the band released their first greatest hits album "Sharin no Jiku" (車輪の軸, "Wheel's Axis").

On October 11th, they held their first and last live concert at Nippon Budokan, "Galileo Galilei Last Live ~Sharin no Jiku~ at Nippon Budokan." Part of the event was exclusively broadcast on internet television station "AbemaTV." Additionally, they sold vinyl records of "Sea and The Darkness" exclusively at the venue and through the online Sony Music Shop.

On January 25, 2017, the band released their first and last live DVD "Galileo Galilei lastlive ~Sharin no Jiku~ at Nippon Budokan."

In 2018, their successor band Bird Bear Hare and Fish was formed.

=== Resumption of Activities ===
On October 11th, 2022, members Yuuki Ozaki, Kazuki Ozaki, Masaki Okazaki, and Fumito Iwai announced that they would be resuming activities as a new version of Galileo Galilei.

On March 29, 2023, the band released their first box set titled "Tsunagari Daisuki Box." Starting in May of the same year, they held their nationwide tour "Bee and The Whales Tour 2023," visiting Zepp venues in five cities across the country. During their final performance at Zepp Haneda (TOKYO), they announced on stage that they would be holding the "Galileo Galilei Tour 2023 'WINTER HARVEST' -Fuyu no Shuukakusai-" in November, visiting Sapporo, Osaka, and Tokyo. With all stops on the Zepp tour selling out immediately and many fans being unable to get tickets, the band decided to hold a new tour as early as Autumn.

Galileo Galilei's first theatrical work "Our Galileo Galilei ~Aetane~: The Movie" was released on November 3, 2023. The theme song of this work "Aetane" (会えたね, "We Met"）was released on October 11th.

== Discography ==
=== Studio albums ===
List of albums, with selected chart positions
Title	Album details	Peak positions	Sales (JPN) (Note: Sales provided by Oricon database and are rounded to the nearest thousand copies.)
Title	Album details	JPN	Sales (JPN)
1tas2	Released: January 2, 2008; Label: self-released; Formats: CD	—	
Parade	Released: February 16, 2011; Label: SME Records; Formats: CD, CD/DVD, digital download	5	28,000
Portal	Released: January 25, 2012; Label: SME Records; Formats: CD, CD/DVD, digital download	10	20,000
Alarms	Released: October 9, 2013; Label: SME Records; Formats: CD, CD/DVD, digital download	15	6,000
Sea and the Darkness	Released: January 27, 2016; Label: SME Records; Formats: CD, CD/DVD, digital download	19	7,000
Bee and the Whales	Released: May 31st, 2023; Label: Ouchi Daisuki Club Records; Formats: CD, CD/DVD, digital download		
MANSTER	Released: September 25, 2024; Label: Ouchi Daisuki Club Records; Formats: CD, digital download		
MANTRAL	Released: September 25, 2024; Label: Ouchi Daisuki Club Records; Formats: CD, digital download		

=== Extended plays ===
List of extended plays, with selected chart positions
Title	Album details	Peak positions	Sales (JPN)
Title	Album details	JPN	Sales (JPN)
Ame Nochi Galileo (雨のちガリレオ, Ame Nochi Garireo; "Rain, Followed by Galileo")	Released: January 21, 2009; Label: Senkō Label; Formats: CD, digital download	38	8,000
Hamanasu no Hana (ハマナスの花; "Japanese Rose Flower")	Released: February 24, 2010; Label: SME Records; Formats: CD, digital download	14	19,000
Baby, It's Cold Outside	Released: October 31, 2012; Label: SME Records; Formats: CD, digital download	19	5,000
See More Glass	Released: October 1, 2014; Label: SME Records; Formats: CD, digital download	23	5,000

=== Compilation albums ===
List of extended plays, with selected chart positions
Title	Album details	Peak positions
Title	Album details	JPN
Sharin no Jiku (車輪の軸, Sharin no Jiku)	Released: June 15, 2016; Label: Sony Music Japan; Formats: CD, CD/DVD, digital download	15

=== Singles ===
List of singles, with selected chart positions
Title	Year	Peak chart positions		Sales (JPN)	Certifications	Album
Title	Year	Oricon Singles Charts	Billboard Japan Hot 100 (Note: Sources for chart positions are as follows: "Hamanasu no Hana", "Natsuzora", "Yotsuba Sagashi no Tabibito", "Boku kara Kimi e", "Aoi Shiori", "Sayonara Frontier", "Asu e", "Circle Game", "Koi no Jumyō", "Arashi no Ato de", "Climber".)	Sales (JPN)	Certifications	Album
"Natsuzora" (夏空; "Summer Sky")	2010	14	9	18,000	RIAJ (digital): Gold	Parade
"Yotsuba Sagashi no Tabibito" (四ツ葉さがしの旅人; "Four Leaf Searcher")	2010	20	19	5,000		Parade
"Boku Kara Kimi e" (僕から君へ; "From Me to You")	2011	15	13	8,000		Parade
"Aoi Shiori" (青い栞; "Blue Bookmark")	2011	9	20	28,000	RIAJ (digital): Gold	Portal
"Sayonara Frontier" (さよならフロンティア, Sayonara Furontia; "Goodbye Frontier")	2011	25	53	6,000		Portal
"Asu e" (明日へ; "To Tomorrow")	2011	17	23	10,000		Portal
"Circle Game" (サークルゲーム, Sākurugēmu)	2013	18	19	26,000		Alarms
"Koi no Jumyō" (恋の寿命; "Limit of Love")	2015	25	48	3,000		Sea and the Darkness
"Arashi no Ato de" (嵐のあとで; "After the Storm")	2015	45	94	1,000		Sea and the Darkness
"Climber" (クライマー, Kuraimā)	2015	29	77	5,000		Sea and the Darkness

=== Promotional singles ===
List of promotional singles, with selected chart positions
Title	Year	Peak chart positions	Album
Title	Year	Billboard Japan Hot 100	Album
"Hamanasu no Hana"	2010	6	Hamanasu no Hana
"Lizzy" (リジー, Rijī)	2012	—	Baby, It's Cold Outside
"Pilot Girl" (パイロットガール, Pairotto Gāru)	2013	—	Alarms
"Hellogoodbye"	2014	—	Non-album single
"Mrs. Summer"	2014	—	See More Glass
"Bananafish no Hamabe to Kuroi Niji" (バナナフィッシュの浜辺と黒い虹; "Bananafish Beach and a Black Rainbow") (with Aimer)	2014	—	See More Glass
"Aoi Chi" (青い血; "Blue Blood")	2016	— (Note: Charted at number 29 on the Radio Songs sub-chart.)	Sea and the Darkness
