= Inception (disambiguation) =

Inception is a 2010 film directed by Christopher Nolan.

Inception may also refer to:

== Music ==
- Inception (Download album), 2002
- Inception (McCoy Tyner album) or the title song, 1962
- Inception (Sanctuary album), 2017
- Inception: Music from the Motion Picture, a soundtrack album from the 2010 film
- Inception, the first disc of the Bee Gees album Inception/Nostalgia, 1970
- "Inception", a song by Ateez from Zero: Fever Part.1, 2020

== Other uses ==
- Inception Motorsports, now Swan Racing, a stock car racing team
- WWA Inception, a 2001 professional wrestling event
- Inception, a 1991 novel by W. A. Harbinson
- Inception, a 2010 novel by S. D. Perry and Britta Dennison
- Peugeot Inception, a concept car

== See also ==
- Concept (disambiguation)
- Conception (disambiguation)
