= Conception =

Conception commonly refers to:

- Concept, an abstract idea or a mental symbol
- Conception (biology), fertilization of the ovum

Conception may also refer to:

== Entertainment ==
- Conception (album), an album by Miles Davis
- "Conception" (song), a 1950 jazz standard by George Shearing
- Conception, a posthumous album by Bill Evans
- Conception (band), a Norwegian band
- Conception (film), a 2011 film
- Conception (video game), a 2012 role-playing video game developed by Spike
  - Conception (anime), a 2018 anime TV series adaptation of the same video game
- Conception II: Children of the Seven Stars, a 2013 RPG video game also by Spike

== Maritime ==
- Sinking of MV Conception, a 2019 fire and sinking of a dive boat

== Places ==
- Conception, Missouri, US
- Conception, Minnesota, US
- Conception Bay, Newfoundland, Canada
- Conception Bay (Namibia)

== See also ==
- Concept (disambiguation)
- Concepción (disambiguation)
- Conception Island (disambiguation)
- Immaculate Conception
