= Suck My World =

Studio album by the Oral Cigarettes
- Released: April 29, 2020
- Genre: Alternative rock
- Length: 57:50
- Language: Japanese
- Label: A-Sketch

The Oral Cigarettes chronology
Kisses and Kills (2018)	Suck My World (2020)	Altergeist0000 (2025)

Suck My World is the fifth studio album from Japanese alternative rock band the Oral Cigarettes. It was released on April 29, 2020, by A-Sketch and consists of fifteen tracks. The song "Wagamama de gomakasanaide" was used as the opening theme of Revisions, and "Dream in Drive" is an opening theme in Scarlet Nexus.

== Track listing ==
All lyrics are written by Takuya Yamanaka; all music is composed by Yamanaka, except where noted.

Suck My World track listing
No.	Title	Music	Length
1.	"Introduction"		2:24
2.	"Tonight the silence kills me with your fire"		2:44
3.	"Fantasy"	2Soul for Surf Music; June; Phillip Woo	4:24
4.	"Dream in Drive"		3:31
5.	"Maze"		4:00
6.	"Don't you think" (feat. Lozareena)		4:22
7.	"Hallelujah"		4:03
8.	"Breathe"		2:29
9.	"Wagamama de gomakasanaide" (ワガママで誤魔化さないで)		4:18
10.	"Shine Holder"		3:49
11.	"Naked"		3:05
12.	"Color Tokyo"		4:46
13.	"From Dusk Till Dawn"		3:43
14.	"The Given"		6:08
15.	"Slowly but surely I go on"	Yamanaka; Naoki Itai	3:56
Total length:			57:50

== Charts ==
Chart performance for Suck My World
Chart	Peak position
Japanese Albums (Oricon)	1
Japanese Hot Albums (Billboard Japan)	1
