= Concept Two =

Concept Two, concept ii, CONCEPT 2, or variation, may refer to:

- Concept2, a rowing equipment and exercise machine manufacturer
- Rimac Concept Two, an all-electric battery-powered hypercar
- AMC Concept II, a concept car proposed as a replacement for the Gremlin

== See also ==
- Concept (disambiguation)
- 2 (disambiguation)
