= List of Scarlet Nexus episodes =

Scarlet Nexus
- Cover art of the first Blu-ray compilation, featuring Yuito Sumeragi (left) and Kasane Randall (right).
- No. of episodes: 26

Release
- Original network: Tokyo MX, BS11, SUN
- Original release: July 1 – December 23, 2021

Scarlet Nexus is an anime series based on the video game of the same name. On March 18, 2021, the adaptation produced by Sunrise was announced and licensed by Funimation outside of Asia. Medialink licensed the anime in South and Southeast Asia. Hiroyuki Nishimura directed the series and Yōichi Katō, Toshizō Nemoto and Akiko Inoue wrote the series' scripts, with Nishimura and Yuji Ito designing the characters, and Hironori Anazawa composing the series' music. The series aired from July 1 to December 23, 2021. From episodes 1–13, the first opening theme is "Red Criminal" by The Oral Cigarettes, who previously performed the game's theme song, "Dream In Drive", while the first ending theme is "Fire" by Yamato(.S). From episodes 14–26, the second opening theme is "MACHINEGUN" by The Oral Cigarettes, while the second ending theme is "Stranger" by Ayumu Imazu.

On August 5, 2021, Funimation premiered an English dub of the series on their streaming service.

== Episode list ==
No.	Title	Directed by	Written by	Storyboarded by	Original release date
1	"Scarlet Psionics"; Transliteration: "Hiiro no Chō Nōryoku" (Japanese: 緋色の超脳力)	Nana Harada	Yōichi Katō	Hiroyuki Nishimura	July 1, 2021 (Note: This episode was pre-screened on June 19, 2021.)
In New Himuka, best friends Yuito Sumeragi and Nagi Karman prepare to attend an induction ceremony for the Other Suppression Force (OSF), recruited members with psionic abilities to protect humanity from the Others, mindless mutants descending from the Extinction Belt. After the induction ceremony, Yuito and Nagi acquire information about Kasane Randall and Naomi Randall, prestigious adoptive sisters who were scouted by the OSF. Alongside Yuito's childhood friend Hanabi Ichijo, both Yuito and Nagi are assigned to the Seto Platoon led by Seto Narukami. The Seto and Kyoka Platoons are deployed on their first mission at the Suzaku Area. Despite being ordered to standby in the rearguard position and wait for backup, Yuito and Nagi attempt to rescue a little girl in danger. When more Others approach them, Yuito and Nagi are provided some assistance from Kasane and Naomi, who were assigned to the Kyoka Platoon led by Kyoka Eden. Yuito soon realizes that his life was once saved by Kasane during childhood. With the first mission officially completed, it has been reported that two members of the OSF lost their lives.
2	"Scarlet Guardians"; Transliteration: "Sukāretto Gādian" (Japanese: スカーレットガーディアン)	Moe Suzuki	Toshizō Nemoto	Tensai Okamura	July 8, 2021 (Note: This episode was pre-screened on June 25, 2021.)
Yuito wonders how Kasane could have saved his life previously when he was five years old. Meanwhile, Naomi encourages Kasane to go sightseeing during their morning off, soon crossing paths with Yuito and Nagi at the Sumeragi Mausoleum. Later on, the Seto and Kyoka Platoons participate in a joint training session by playing capture the flag. Upon noticing that Naomi might have a crush on Yuito, Kasane plans to use the mock battle to test if Yuito is worthy enough for Naomi. Due to Arashi Spring letting down the Kyoka Platoon with her laziness, Tsugumi Nazar manages to clench the win for the Seto Platoon. Soon after, the Seto and Kyoka Platoons are deployed on another mission at Suoh in an abandoned subway system. Unfortunately, Wataru Frazer and Haruka Frazer, twin siblings who serve as the respective operators for the Seto and Kyoka Platoons, experience communication interference deeper into the tunnels. Yuito, Kasane and Gemma Garrison break through fallen rubble which trapped Nagi and Naomi on the other side. Naomi suddenly shields Kasane from being shot by an unknown assailant, leading Naomi to become encased in icy crystals due to the bullet lodged in her chest.
3	"Conspiracy"; Transliteration: "Inbō" (Japanese: 陰謀)	Masaharu Tomoda	Toshizō Nemoto	Kurio Miyaura	July 15, 2021
After Naomi transforms into an Other, she is suddenly teleported away by three mysterious individuals. Arashi's younger brother Fubuki Spring urges Yuito, Kasane, Gemma, Tsugumi and Nagi to turn a blind eye about what occurred and report that Naomi was killed in action instead. Nagi is sent to the hospital, while Kasane is disowned from her adoptive mother after failing to protect Naomi. Karen Travers informs Kasane that Naomi was taken away by a terrorist group called Seiran, who could return Naomi to her human form. Kasane later inspects two ampoules that Yuito found in the subway tunnels, realizing that the ampoules familiarly bear the mark of Seiran. The civilians are ordered to evacuate the premises as a full-scale mission at Kunad Highway is underway. Yuito remains suspicious when Nagi has fully recovered but does not recall that Naomi has transformed into an Other. As the Seto and Kyoka Platoons reach their post, they become surrounded by a special force led by Gemma, who accuses Seto of leading unethical research. Karen's younger brother Luka Travers is momentarily confronted by Karen, while Kasane believes that the New Himukan Government had something to do with Naomi.
4	"Red Strings"; Transliteration: "Reddo Sutoringusu" (Japanese: レッドストリングス)	Kiyoshi Egami	Akiko Inoue	Shinji Itadaki	July 22, 2021
As the Seto and Kyoka Platoons are raided by Gemma's special force, Nagi is mentally triggered to attack Yuito and Kasane, who fail to convince Nagi that Naomi is still alive. Seto steps in to assist, but he ultimately dies from lethal injury after temporarily incapacitating Nagi. A quasi-black hole hovers over the sky and consumes Gemma's special force. Luka rescues Gemma, Hanabi and Tsugumi, but Seto's body ends up being taken by the quasi-black hole. Yuito and Kasane are teleported to the Realm of the Red Strings from Kasane's recurring visions. An image of Yuito's ancestor Yakumo Sumeragi briefly appears before Kasane is enveloped by the Red Strings. Yuito is found by Gemma, Hanabi and Tsugumi on the Kunad Highway. At a nearby shelter, Gemma reveals to Yuito, Hanabi and Tsugumi that the New Himukan Government is creating a surveillance state within Suoh in an effort to enact growth suppression on civilians with verified aptitude for psionic abilities. However, it is also conducting personality rehabilitation experiments, which explains what happened to Nagi. Karen witnesses a swarm of Others wreaking havoc in Suoh, while Kasane is found by Arashi, Kyoka and Shiden Ritter near the Kunad Highway.
5	"Karen's Revolt"; Transliteration: "Karen no Hanran" (Japanese: カレンの反乱)	Kyōhei Suzuki	Yōichi Katō	Shinji Itadaki	July 29, 2021
As Yuito, Gemma, Hanabi and Tsugumi aid in suppressing the Others at Suoh, Wataru telepathically warns Yuito that Arahabaki, the computer system in Suoh, has shut down and the Seiran Regional Force has staged a coup d'etat against the New Himukan Government. Fubuki later drafts Yuito, Gemma, Hanabi and Tsugumi into his unit, tasking them to ensure the safety of Yuito's father Joe Sumeragi, who is the chairman of the New Himukan Government. Luka has failed to locate Karen as well as Kagero Donne and the Kyoka Platoon. Karen suddenly transmits a nationwide television broadcast, in which he swears his allegiance to Seiran and exposes the New Himukan Government for intending to impose a surveillance state. He then encourages the civilians to overthrow the New Himukan Government and start a revolution. Gemma, Hanabi and Tsugumi handle the Others in the area, while Yuito makes his way to touch base with Joe at the council shelter, which has been overrun by Others. Inside the council shelter, Yuito stumbles upon Kasane holding a knife and standing next to Joe's body before she suddenly rushes at Yuito.
6	"A Doomed Tomorrow"; Transliteration: "Hametsu no Ashita" (Japanese: 破滅の明日)	Akira Toba	Toshizō Nemoto	Shinji Itadaki	August 5, 2021
In the ruins of Suoh, Karen briefly ambushes Kasane to absorb and copy her psionic ability before escaping in front of Arashi, Kyoka and Shiden. After learning from a blind older Yuito that fifty years have passed, Arashi, Kyoka and Shiden vanish into thin air and return to the original timeline. It is explained that the older Yuito and Kasane both possess the true psionic ability of manipulating dimensions called psycho-gravikinesis, which allows Kasane to travel through time via the Red Strings. The Kunad Gate is the quasi-black hole which was spawned from Yuito and Kasane's combined psycho-gravikinesis. The older Yuito goads the Others into killing him, finally closing the Kunad Gate. The emotional shock causes Kasane to instinctively use her psycho-gravikinesis and return to the original timeline. As Kasane reaches the council shelter, she stumbles upon an injured Joe, who succumbs to his death after confirming that Naomi was transformed into an Other by the New Himukan Government. Kasane attempts to attack Yuito when he arrives, but she retreats with hidden assistance from Kagero when Gemma, Hanabi, Luka and Tsugumi arrive afterwards. Kasane then tells the rest of the Kyoka Platoon about what she has learned.
7	"The Hunt for Nagi"; Transliteration: "Tsuiseki, Nagi" (Japanese: 追跡、ナギ)	Hiromichi Matano	Toshizō Nemoto	Moe Suzuki; Kurio Miyaura	August 12, 2021
Yuito's older brother Kaito Sumeragi, who is the chief of the OSF, and Fubuki assign Yuito to command a special platoon composed of Gemma, Hanabi, Luka, Tsugumi and Wataru. At the Seiran Headquarters, Karen assigns Kasane to command another special platoon composed of Arashi, Kagero, Kyoka, Shiden and Haruka. Kasane later admits that she briefly encountered Karen in the future, and he tells Kasane that Naomi is being held in a top-secret Seiran Research Facility. Arashi discreetly advises Kasane to keep up appearances until they can locate it. At the OSF Hospital, Yuito begins to have hazy memories, despite only suffering from mental fatigue. Hanabi witnesses Nagi being transferred out of the OSF Hospital, while Tsugumi finds out that Nagi has been taken to an old hospital in Lokusho City destroyed eleven years ago, leading the Yuito Platoon to investigate inside. Meanwhile, the Kasane Platoon notices that the Kunad Gate is gradually growing. The Yuito Platoon easily destroys an Other, while Nagi manages to escape being strapped onto an electric chair by a group of scientists.
8	"The Hospital's Secrets"; Transliteration: "Byōin no Shinsō" (Japanese: 病院の真相)	Shuntarō Tozawa	Akiko Inoue	Tensai Okamura	August 19, 2021
The group of scientists unleash a horde of Others when Nagi finds the Yuito Platoon. Nagi holds off the horde of Others and is eventually recaptured by the group of scientists, while Luka teleports Yuito, Gemma, Hanabi and Tsugumi outside of the Old OSF Hospital, stating that their investigation is compromised. As the Yuito Platoon takes refuge at the shelter, Fubuki briefly explains that the Old OSF Hospital is used for experiments, where test subjects underwent either personality rehabilitation like Nagi or metamorphosis like Naomi yielded as two byproducts. Luka reveals that Fubuki was engaged to Hanabi's aunt Alice Ichigo, who accidentally underwent metamorphosis while on combat duty. At night, the Kasane Platoon infiltrates the Seiran Research Facility, finding a case of ampoules there. In a narrow corridor, the Kasane Platoon finds Naomi in her Other form inside a room. Before Naomi starts running rampant, Karen fortunately arrives to inject Naomi with an ampoule to sedate her temporarily. Karen explains that the ampoules are only a stopgap to help Naomi retain some human semblance, but Kasane's psionic ability could restore Naomi's humanity. Yuito receives a parcel of prescription drugs, which is shockingly a case of ampoules.
9	"A Dubious Wonder Drug"; Transliteration: "Giwaku no Tokkōyaku" (Japanese: 疑惑の特効薬)	Shinji Nagata	Yōichi Katō	Shinji Nagata	August 26, 2021
Fubuki tasks the Yuito Platoon to gather evidence concerning illegal human experimentation conducted by the New Himukan Government despite the dangerous implications. Upon reaching the area of operations, they are attacked by the Others. Yuito is forced to consume liquid from an ampoule, abnormally boosting his psionic ability and easily defeating the Others. Upon spotting two transport trucks registered to the Seiran Regional Force, the Yuito Platoon follow them to the Seiran Research Facility, where Yuito bitterly realizes that the ampoules contain samples of human brains. The Yuito Platoon is intercepted by the Kasane Platoon, as it is explained that Karen wants to restore Naomi's humanity. A fight ensues between the two platoons, though Arashi allows the Yuito Platoon to escape. Naomi is saddened upon learning the truth about the ampoules, as she refuses to take them anymore and wants to be left alone. The Yuito Platoon hidess out in a log cabin, where Fubuki says that he reported the incident to the New Himukan Government to take the blame for committing treason. Moreover, it is revealed that both Fubuki and Karen suggested for the facility to be built in the first place.
10	"The Rebel Yuito"; Transliteration: "Hangyakusha Yuito" (Japanese: 反逆者ユイト)	Masatoshi Hakada	Toshizō Nemoto	Kurio Miyaura	September 2, 2021
Fubuki tasks the Yuito Platoon to infiltrate the Old OSF Hospital and recover Nagi's extracted memory data containing evidence of Naomi's witnessed metamorphosis. Meanwhile, Karen concludes the direct connection between the Kunad Gate's expansion and Yuito's psionic ability to the Kasane Platoon. Nagi ambushes and captures the Yuito Platoon after having undergone more personality rehabilitation. While strapped to the electric chair, Yuito learns from the lead scientist that he was a test subject for dud modification as a child without a psionic ability. Yuito's current power shortages and memory lapses are a result of his psionic ability causing accumulated brain damage. Fubuki saves the Yuito Platoon, despite the mission deemed a failure. Before allowing the Yuito Platoon to escape from the Old OSF Hospital, Fubuki gives Yuito a device that grants access to Arahabaki before staying behind to handle a horde of Others. Karen intercepts the Yuito Platoon, now wanted by the New Himukan Government for committing treason. After advising the Yuito Platoon to seek refuge at an independent city called Togetsu, Karen gives Yuito an ampoule for stability. Karen assists Fubuki in eradicating the Others, while Kyoka encourages Kasane to defect from Seiran and flee to Togetsu.
11	"Togetsu"; Transliteration: "Togetsu e" (Japanese: トゲツへ)	Akira Toba	Akiko Inoue	Shinji Itadaki	September 9, 2021
At the shelter, Gemma, Hanabi, Luka, Tsugumi and Wataru learn that Yuito underwent dud modification as a child to obtain his psionic ability. The Yuito Platoon eventually agrees with going to Togetsu. Meanwhile, Kyoka and Haruka discover that the transport trucks supplying human brains used to manufacture the prescription drug in the ampoules came from Togetsu. The Kasane Platoon also eventually agrees with going to Togetsu. Karen takes Fubuki to a private hospital, reminiscing their moments with Alice. The Kasane Platoon slay an Other while en route in the snowy Hineo Mountain to Togetsu, though Kagero chooses to wander off for personal reasons. Outside the temple, Kasane, Arashi, Kyoka and Shiden are greeted by three cloaked and masked priestesses, though Kasane refuses to believe that she was actually born in Togetsu but kidnapped by the New Himuka Government to exploit her psionic ability. Kasane, Arashi and Shiden are surrounded and incapacitated by clones, who shockingly bear the face of Kyoka. On the other hand, the Yuito Platoon is warmly received by three priests, who promise that all questions will be answered inside the temple.
12	"The Moon's Secrets"; Transliteration: "Tsuki no Himitsu" (Japanese: 月の秘密)	Moe Suzuki	Toshizō Nemoto	Shinji Itadaki	September 16, 2021
The Yuito Platoon is taken to a chamber, where they learn that the Design Children are genetic clones manufactured by Togetsu, in which Kyoka is modeled after renounced neuroscience researcher Dr. Hitoyo Pope. When a shift in Earth's orbit caused an environmental cataclysm three thousand years ago, the human race immigrated to the Moon and waited for Earth to repair. A group of settlers called the People of the Ark returned to Earth and established New Himuka. However, the Extinction Belt blocked off all communication with the Moon's inhabitants. The Kunad Gate is forecast to engulf Earth in the near future, though the Togetsu Faith believes that its purpose is to remake the universe for the better good. The head priest escorts the Yuito Platoon to BABE, an advanced computer system in Togetsu, to have more questions answered. Kagero has a change of heart and decides to rescue Kasane. While inside an isolated room, Kasane realizes that she is one of the Design Children, and her mother figure was a scientist of the Togetsu Faith who was taken away from her as a child. As Kagero rescues Kasane, he determines that the Yuito Platoon are being escorted to BABE.
13	"The Design Children"; Transliteration: "Dezain Chirudoren" (Japanese: デザインチルドレン)	Hiromichi Matano	Yōichi Katō	Tensai Okamura	September 23, 2021
As if his brain was being hijacked, Yuito becomes paralyzed by the sudden influx of data from touching BABE, which even extends to Gemma, Hanabi, Luka and Tsugumi. When Kasane and Kagero are denied access to BABE, Kasane manages to beat the odds by telepathically urging Yuito sever the connection to BABE. With the Yuito Platoon regaining mobility again, Luka remotely unlocks the isolated room containing Arashi and Shiden, per Kasane's request. The Yuito Platoon prepares to escape but are met with resistance along the way from clones bearing the face of Kasane, while the Kasane Platoon make it outside the temple but are intercepted by Kyoka. Though showing hesitation to follow through, Kyoka reveals that her mission was to bring Kasane to Togetsu once Kasane awakened the Red Strings. After Kasane sympathetically encourages Kyoka to define her self-concept, Kyoka proclaims her desire to protect her new friends and she is accepted with open arms. The Yuito and Kasane Platoons regroup inside Kagero's secret hideout, where they share their intel so far. Kagero also reveals that he is actually one of the People of the Ark, in which his secret hideout is indeed a spaceship.
14	"A 2,000-Year Ambition"; Transliteration: "Nisen-nen no Omoi" (Japanese: 二千年の想い)	Nana Harada	Toshizō Nemoto	Shinji Itadaki	September 30, 2021
Kagero explains that his body was preserved in a cryosleep capsule for two thousand years. As the Suoh OSF suddenly storms Kagero's spaceship, the Yuito and Kasane Platoons are forced to escape from Hineo Mountain and make their way towards a cavern in pairs. Kagero reveals that Yakumo was the leader of the People of the Ark. The Moon's inhabitants were turned into Others after suffering from a disease outbreak caused by radiation emitting from a comet, and the Extinction Belt was created using satellites to divert the lingering radiation towards Earth instead. Upon regrouping at the cavern, the Yuito and Kasane Platoons encounter an Other impervious to their attacks, forcing them to fall back and formulate a strategy. Kagero was among the immigrants who founded Togetsu, which eventually created the Red Strings as a way to rewrite history. After the Yuito and Kasane Platoons defeat the Other and exit the cavern, Kagero confesses that he was formerly a spy up until being against Togetsu's plan to erase the past. The Yuito and Kasane Platoons return to their factions, hoping that they could get both Suoh and Seiran on board with thwarting Togetsu's plan.
15	"Nagi Attacks"; Transliteration: "Nagi, Shūgeki" (Japanese: ナギ、襲撃)	Kiyoshi Egami	Toshizō Nemoto	Kurio Miyaura	October 7, 2021
A state of emergency has been declared at Suoh, where the Yuito Platoon is attacked by Nagi with a desire to extract Yuito's brain. Yuito manages to lure Nagi to their secret training base where they were formerly cadets. Nagi struggles to gain control of his psyche and eventually dies after sincerely apologizing to Yuito. After laying Nagi's body to rest, Yuito sets out to confront Kaito. At the OSF Headquarters, Kaito explains their duty to fulfill Yakumo's dearest wish is to exact vengeance on the Moon's inhabitants for creating the Extinction Belt. The New Himuka Government plans to use Yuito's psycho-gravikinesis to move the Extinction Belt and attack the Moon's inhabitants directly, even if it involves accessing the brains of every civilian in New Himuka to do it. Moreover, Yakumo is being kept in a cryosleep capsule deep underground. Kaito disowns Yuito as his brother when the latter refuses to partake in such a genocidal mission. In his bunker, Wataru has gathered incriminating evidence on Kaito, thanks to Arashi. Yuito ultimately decides that he must transmit the images nationwide through Arahabaki. Meanwhile, the Kasane Platoon learns that Fubuki authorized the human-derived Others to be transferred from the Seiran Research Facility.
16	"Naomi and Alice"; Transliteration: "Naomi to Arisu" (Japanese: ナオミとアリス)	Yūta Takamura	Akiko Inoue	Shinji Itadaki	October 14, 2021
Naomi bonds with Alice as fellow human-derived Others being held in captivity before the Seiran Regional Force take them to a testing area for a new mind-controlling weapon. The Yuito Platoon enters the upper levels of Arahabaki, where they make their way underground to the nearest access point. It turns out that Kaito was the one who not only authorized the human-derived Others to be transferred to the testing area, but he also ordered the Suoh OSF to assassinate Fubuki after suspecting betrayal. The Kasane Platoon tries to save the human-derived Others, but things go south when the Design Children seek to retrieve Kasane. The Design Children destroy the mind-controlling weapon and overwhelm the Kasane Platoon. However, the human-derived Others sacrifice their lives to slay the Design Children. Before dying, Naomi urges Kasane to live on without her. After saving Fubuki from being assassinated by the Suoh OSF, Karen learns that Alice has died and teleports to the testing area. Karen hastily assimilates Kasane's psycho-gravikinesis before vanishing. The Yuito Platoon uploads the video message into Arahabaki, despite the implications of Yuito destroying his reputation. Before leaving Arahabaki, Yuito is ambushed by Karen, who proceeds to assimilate Yuito's psycho-gravikinesis.
17	"Arahabaki's Trap"; Transliteration: "Arahabaki no Wana" (Japanese: アラハバキの罠)	Shō Hamada; Michita Shiraishi	Yōichi Katō	Tsukasa Sunaga	October 21, 2021
Gemma, Hanabi, Luka and Tsugumi try to protect Yuito from Karen, while Kaito deals with the blowback of his corruption being broadcast nationwide. After hacking into Arahabaki and temporarily restraining the Yuito Platoon with its red cables, Karen forces Yuito to open a portal to the past before disappearing. The Kasane Platoon arrives at the access point of Arahabaki, realizing that Yuito is suffering from severe brain damage. If Yuito fully succumbs to amnesia, then he might cease to exist from time and space. The only way to save Yuito is for his friends to digitize and upload their memories into him. Meanwhile, Yuito finds himself in the Realm of the Red Strings, where he has a vision of his future self and his biological mother. Thanks to Arashi quickly coding a special program and Kagero previously acquiring Yuito's brain scan data from Togetsu, Yuito manages to regain consciousness after hearing his friends call out for him. The Yuito and Kasane Platoons return to the surface, content that the civilians no longer trust the New Himukan Government. Fubuki meets up with them, but he collapses from his injuries before attempting to discuss the next course of action.
18	"Karen's Wish"; Transliteration: "Karen no Negai" (Japanese: カレンの願い)	Hiroki Ikeshita	Toshizō Nemoto	Yūko Horikawa; Moe Suzuki	October 28, 2021
While recovering at a safe house, Fubuki confirms to the Yuito and Kasane Platoons that the Seiran Research Facility was originally built to help Alice return to her human form. During childhood, Fubuki and Alice learned that Karen and Luka underwent dud modification, in which Karen awakened his psionic ability after many trial runs. Fubuki, Karen and Alice were assigned to the same platoon and completed several missions together for two years. When they were deployed to an area in Suoh, where sections of the Extinction Belt were descending, they were ambushed by Others. A beam from the Extinction Belt nearly touched Karen, prompting Alice to contain the beam within herself. Alice underwent metamorphosis, forcing Karen to incapacitate her. Karen and Fubuki managed to transfer Alice from the OSF Hospital to the Seiran Research Facility, but she faced a lengthy lockup after enduring fruitless experiments. The Yuito and Kasane Platoons conclude that Karen failed to rewrite history despite repeatedly traveling through time, though the pressing matter is about returning to Togetsu and shutting down BABE. Fubuki also agrees to act as an intermediary to order a ceasefire between Suoh and Seiran. Kagero reveals the truth about murdering Joe.
19	"Kagero's Confession"; Transliteration: "Kagerō no Kokuhaku" (Japanese: カゲロウの告白)	Akira Toba	Toshizō Nemoto	Shinji Itadaki	November 4, 2021
Yuito is emotionally moved to challenge Kagero to a duel, finally getting Kagero to speak from the heart. In the past, Kagero confessed that he was a double agent for Togetsu at the council shelter, urging Joe to take a sabbatical by faking his death. Instead, Joe yearned to tell Yuito and Kaito that Yakumo never intended to wage war in the first place. Kagero and Joe were unfortunately attacked by a swarm of Others, and Joe took a fatal blow to the chest prior to being found by Kasane in his final moments. In the present, Kagero reveals that his time spent with his wife and daughter would be erased if Togetsu's plan was successful. The Yuito and Kasane Platoons initiate their infiltration into Togetsu using the cavern that leads to Hineo Mountain. Wataru and Haruka confirm that the Kunad Gate is growing rapidly due to Yuito's psionic ability increasing exponentially. Yuito puts aside the concern that his psionic ability might progressively wane due to what happened to him inside Arahabaki. Luka teleports everyone inside the chamber of BABE, which generates a holographic image of a woman as both Yuito and Kasane identify her as their mother.
20	"Together Again"; Transliteration: "Saikai" (Japanese: 再会)	Masatoshi Hakada	Akiko Inoue	Shinji Itadaki	November 11, 2021
The generated holographic image is of Wakana Sumeragi, a scientist who defected from the Togetsu Faith due to their unethical experiments and went to Suoh for her protection. Unable to acquire more information about the Kunad Gate, the Yuito and Kasane Platoons find out that the floor of the chamber starts dismantling, which forces them to flee across a bridge which slowly falls apart. After reaching the main unit of BABE, they realize that all the data has been magically erased. Based on Luka's suggestion, Kasane opts to travel eleven years into the past using her Red Strings. After Kasane reaches the courtyard of the Old OSF Hospital, she successfully find Wakana, who has been expecting Kasane. This is because BABE transmitted data from the present to the past. As a swarm of Others attacks the Old OSF Hospital, Kasane finds a frightened five-year-old Yuito and gives him an ear cuff that prevents amnesia. After saving Wakana from an assassin for Togetsu, Kasane successfully brings Wakana to the present, where they are reunited with Yuito, who now fully remembers that Kasane did indeed save his life eleven years ago.
21	"Wakana's Resolve"; Transliteration: "Wakana no Ketsui" (Japanese: ワカナの決意)	Hiromichi Matano	Yōichi Katō	Shinji Itadaki	November 18, 2021
After having breakfast together, Wakana tells the Yuito and Kasane Platoons that Yuito and Kasane need to correct the dimensional entanglements within the Kunad Gate. Yuito and Kasane use their psycho-gravikinesis to enter the Kunad Gate and reach the Realm of the Red Strings, now recognized as the Chronos Terminal. Once there, Yuito and Kasane manually untangle the Red Strings in three separate points in time. First, they fix the Old OSF Hospital which was attacked by the Others eleven years ago, and Yuito officially thanks Kasane for saving his life that day. Second, they fix the dystopian Suoh where Kasane met the older Yuito fifty years in the future, as to which they have a discussion about the possibility of changing history using their psionic abilities. Third, they fix an event two thousand years ago where they surprisingly spot Karen. With the mission completed, Yuito and Kasane return to the present, only to realize that the Kunad Gate still remains open. Wakana returns to her original timeline, leaving behind a heartfelt message and sharing her plans to upload her brain scan data into the database of BABE.
22	"Brothers"; Transliteration: "Ani to Otōto" (Japanese: 兄と弟)	Yūta Takamura	Toshizō Nemoto	Shinji Itadaki	November 25, 2021
The Yuito and Kasane Platoons recover at the safe house, but they escape to Wataru's bunker when the Suoh OSF storms the safe house. Yuito and Kasane assess that they caught a glimpse Karen assassinating Yakumo within the third dimensional entanglement. Although it is highly unlikely that Karen could be Yuito's ancestor, the Yuito and Kasane Platoons must gain access to the Sumeragi Mausoleum to find out the truth. With some help from Fubuki, Yuito is given a chance to meet with Kaito, who has been ousted and placed under house arrest. Meanwhile, Karen is disrupted from traveling through time to the past, finding himself in a desolate city. At a secluded intersection in Kikuchiba, Kaito still intends to kill Yuito and extract his brain. As they are suddenly approached by a group of Others, Yuito protects Kaito and defeats the Others. While reconciling with Kaito, Yuito reaffirms his vow to protect the civilians of New Himuka. As they are closed in by more Others, Kaito relinquishes the key to the Sumeragi Mausoleum. Fortunately, Fubuki arrives after successfully ordering a ceasefire between Suoh and Seiran in a joint effort to close the Kunad Gate.
23	"The Sumeragi Mausoleum"; Transliteration: "Sumeragi Ryō e" (Japanese: スメラギ陵へ)	Kōji Sasaki	Akiko Inoue	Shinji Itadaki	December 2, 2021
Another state of emergency has been declared at Suoh, which becomes overrun by a swarm of Others. Yuito is transported to the OSF Hospital so he can recover from overusing his psionic ability, while Fubuki temporarily reinstates Kaito as the chief of the OSF. The New Himukan Government has determined that the Extinction Belt has reached a dangerously low altitude, which gives priority to closing the Kunad Gate as soon as possible. Gemma, Hanabi, Kyoka, Luka and Shiden make plans to visit a gyōza joint. Tsugumi tells Kagero that she does not need his protection anymore, while Fubuki encourages Arashi to stop lounging around in his office. The next day, Yuito expresses his desire to live in a world not governed by psionic abilities, and Kasane feels inspired to join in his cause. The Yuito and Kasane Platoons enter the Sumeragi Mausoleum, where painful illusions recount the many times that Karen tried to save Naomi. They eventually locate Yakumo's tomb, surprised to see a still-living Karen wearing Yakumo's mask.
24	"Slumbering Desire"; Transliteration: "Nemureru Omoi" (Japanese: 眠れる想い)	Kiyoshi Egami	Yōichi Katō	Tsukasa Sunaga	December 9, 2021
The past Karen reveals that he created multiple dimensional entanglements by assuming Yakumo's identity as a user of the Red Strings, which spawned alternate versions of himself in hopes of changing Alice's fate with no luck. Unexpectedly, the Yuito and Kasane Platoons are startled by the sudden appearance of the present Karen, the one who previously assimilated Yuito and Kasane's psycho-gravikinesis. The present Karen forcibly assimilates the past Karen's psionic ability and acquires a direct connection to Arahabaki. In doing so, the present Karen experiences the memories of every single person connected to Arabahaki, including those from the countless copies of himself. The present Karen shows Yuito and Kasane the fond and tragic memories of Nagi and Naomi. After making peace with their memories, Yuito and Kasane urge the present Karen to recall a time when Alice desired for him to be happy for her sake. However, the present Karen still refuses to stand down. Since the present Karen will no longer listen to reason, the Yuito and Kasane Platoons combine their strengths against him.
25	"Operation Destroy the Kunad Gate"; Transliteration: "Kunado Gēto Shōmetsu Sakusen" (Japanese: クナドゲート消滅作戦)	Moe Suzuki	Akiko Inoue	Shinji Itadaki	December 16, 2021
Fubuki halts the battle and finally convinces Karen to stand down, saying that Alice would have never wanted Karen to waste his entire life trying to save her. At the OSF Hospital, Fubuki wants Karen to fulfill Alice's wish of smiling more often. Fubuki and Karen inform Yuito that the Kunad Gate could be closed if the Yuito and Kasane Platoons acquire a direct connection to Arahabaki with Karen's help, which would allow Yuito and Kasane to move the Extinction Belt inside the Kunad Gate. Yuito is determined to go through with this risky operation. Kaito orders the Suoh OSF and the Seiran Regional Force to intercept the incoming swarm of Others. Yuito briefly collapses and has a vision of a young Alice on top of a landfill of Others. The operation is deemed a success when the Extinction Belt is consumed by the Kunad Gate. However, a final dimensional entanglement still need to be corrected. Due to him meddling in the past, Karen uses the Red Strings to erase himself from existence, which finally closes the Kunad Gate and saves Earth from being destroyed. Alice is shown to be resurrected, but she has no memory of Karen.
26	"To Each Their Own Future"; Transliteration: "Sorezore no Asu" (Japanese: それぞれの未来(あす))	Hiroyuki Nishimura	Toshizō Nemoto	Hiroyuki Nishimura	December 23, 2021
In the aftermath, Gemma jokingly mentions that Shiden has been promoted to platoon commander. There is still an ongoing conflict between Suoh and Seiran, while the Others are still a threat. Hanabi is glad that the truth behind the Old OSF Hospital has come to light, while Tsugumi hears that Kaito has been found guilty for crimes against humanity and has been deposed from the OSF. Fubuki and Alice finally plan to get married. Luka has been promoted to regiment commander. Yuito and Kasane discuss that they still remember that Karen once existed, while their friends have slowly forgotten about Karen. Kyoka and Kagero will be a part of the Lunar Surface Survey Project and assist the OSF in dismantling the Togetsu Faith. Kagero's real name is Shin Daniel, while Kasane volunteers to be a part of the recon team. After being honorably discharged from the OSF, Yuito wants to become a politician in order to create a world where psionic users and duds can live in harmony. Yuito, Kasane and their friends are still determined to keep protecting the world that they fought so hard to save.

== Home Media release ==
=== Japanese ===
Happinet Media Marketing (Region 2 — Japan)
Vol.	Episodes	Cover art	Release date	Ref.
1	1–6	Yuito Sumeragi & Kasane Randall	December 17, 2021	
2	7–13	Gemma Garrison & Luka Travers	February 2, 2022	
3	14–19	Arashi Spring & Shiden Ritter	March 2, 2022	
4	20–26	Karen Travers & Fubuki Spring	March 30, 2022	

=== English ===
Crunchyroll (Region 1 — USA)
Vol.	Episodes	Release date	Ref.
Season 1 Part 1	1-13	October 25, 2022	
Season 1 Part 2	14-26	December 19, 2022	
