= Concept S =

Concept S may refer to:

- Lamborghini Concept S, a 2005 concept car based on the ' Lamborghini Gallardo '
- Rimac Concept S, a derivative of the ' Rimac Concept One '

== See also ==
- Concept (disambiguation)
- S (disambiguation)
