= Conception Island =

Conception Island may refer to:

- Conception Island, Bahamas
- Conception Island, Seychelles

== See also ==
- Conception (disambiguation)
