= Revisions (TV series) =

Japanese anime television series

- Anime key visual

リヴィジョンズ (Ribijonzu)
- Genre: Science Fiction, Action, Mecha
- Created by: SFS
- Manga
- Written by: SFS
- Illustrated by: Kuro
- Published by: Kodansha
- Magazine: Monthly Shōnen Sirius
- Original run: November 26, 2018 – June 26, 2019
- Volumes: 2
- Anime television series
- Directed by: Gorō Taniguchi
- Produced by: Akitoshi Mori; Toshiaki Obata; Kazuya Ide
- Written by: Makoto Fukami; Taichi Hashimoto
- Music by: Azusa Kikuchi
- Studio: Shirogumi
- Licensed by: Netflix (streaming): NA: Sentai Filmworks (home video)
- Original network: Fuji TV (+Ultra)
- Original run: January 10, 2019 – March 28, 2019
- Episodes: 12

Revisions (Japanese: リヴィジョンズ, Hepburn: Rivijonzu) is an anime television series directed by Gorō Taniguchi and animated by Shirogumi. The series aired from January to March 2019 on Fuji TV's +Ultra programming block.

== Plot ==
Daisuke Dojima is a student who was kidnapped when he was a child. Now he and his friends are involved in one of the "Shibuya Drift" strange events, travelling 300 years into the future. There, the enemy known as "Revisions" fight using giant mechanical monsters. Daisuke and his friends are fighting to defeat the enemy and recover their present.

== Characters ==
Daisuke Dojima (堂嶋 大介, Dōjima Daisuke)
Voiced by: Kōki Uchiyama (Japanese); Bryce Papenbrook (English)
Daisuke is a 17-year-old sophomore student at Seisho Academy. He has an extreme hero complex due to Milo foretelling his prophecy when he was a child, and he grew up a strong believer of it.
Milo (ミロ, Miro)
Voiced by: Mikako Komatsu (Japanese); Reba Buhr (English)
Milo is a 19-year-old agent of AHRV from the year 2388 who assists the Shibuya Defense Service (SDS) in their battle against the Revisions. Her future self had encountered the SDS as children and told Daisuke of his prophecy, a time she would personally experience near the end of the series.
Chang Gai Steiner (張・剴・シュタイナー, Chan Gai Shutainā)
Voiced by: Nobunaga Shimazaki (Japanese); Kyle McCarley (English)
Gai is one of Daisuke's childhood friends and the twin brother of Lu. Officially, he is assigned to be the leader of the SDS.
Chang Lu Steiner (張・露・シュタイナー, Chan Rū Shutainā)
Voiced by: Rie Takahashi (Japanese); Cherami Leigh (English)
Lu is one of Daisuke's childhood friends and the twin sister of Gai.
Marin Temari (手真輪 愛鈴, Temari Marin)
Voiced by: Manaka Iwami (Japanese); Erika Harlacher (English)
Marin, nicknamed Marimari, is one of Daisuke's childhood friends and a member of the SDS. Unlike the others, Marin is originally very weak-willed, but she later overcomes this.
Keisaku Asano (浅野 慶作, Asano Keisaku)
Voiced by: Sōma Saitō (Japanese); Griffin Burns (English)
Keisaku is one of Daisuke's childhood friends and a member of the SDS. He is considered to be Daisuke's best friend and the only who accepts Daisuke's hero complex. Amongst the people in Shibuya who were transported to the year 2388, Keisuke came to the time period solely with his mother named Yoshie Asano.
Chiharu Isurugi (チハル・イスルギ, Chiharu Isurugi)
Voiced by: Yōko Hikasa (Japanese); Lauren Landa (English)
Chiharu is a blue-haired member of the Revisions who eagerly awaits for her new body to complete.
Mukyu Isurugi (ムキュー・イスルギ, Mukyū Isurugi)
Voiced by: Yukari Tamura (Japanese); Melissa Fahn (English)
Mukyu is a green-haired member of the Revisions who constantly abuses Nicholas.
Nicholas Satō (ニコラス・サトウ, Nikorasu Satō)
Voiced by: Hōchū Ōtsuka (Japanese); Keith Silverstein (English)
Nicholas is a member of the Revisions and the main antagonist of the series. In public, he takes the form of a small and harmless anthropomorphic dog plushie. However, his true body has the frightening ability to control gravity and wreak major havoc.
Mikio Dojima (堂嶋 幹夫, Dōjima Mikio)
Voiced by: Takahiro Sakurai (Japanese); Erik Scott Kimerer (English)
Mikio is Daisuke's uncle.
Yumiko Yazawa (矢沢 悠美子, Yazawa Yumiko)
Voiced by: Aya Endō
Yumiko is a teacher at Seisho Academy.
Ryōhei Kuroiwa (黒岩 亮平, Kuroiwa Ryōhei)
Voiced by: Masaki Terasoma (Japanese); Jake Green (English)
Kuroiwa is the police chief of Shibuya.
Seiichirō Muta (牟田 誠一郎, Muta Seiichirō)
Voiced by: Nobuo Tobita (Japanese); Joe Ochman (English)
Muta is the mayor of Shibuya. His ideals for survival highly differed from Kuroiwa, as he believed that negotiating with the Revisions would benefit them greatly.
Kanae Izumi (泉海 香苗, Izumi Kanae)
Voiced by: Yuka Terasaki (Japanese); Christine Marie Cabanos (English)
Izumi is a police officer who works with the SDS.

== Anime ==
Fuji TV announced the series during a livestream event in March 2018. The series is directed by Gorō Taniguchi and written by Makoto Fukami and Taichi Hashimoto, with animation by studio Shirogumi. Character designs for the series are provided by Sunao Chikaoka and adapted for CG animation by Jun Shirai. Kazuhiko Takahashi serves as director of photography, Takamitsu Hirakawa is the CG director for the series, Jin Aketagawa is the sound director, Akari Saitō is the editor, and Azusa Kikuchi composes the series' music. Other staff includes Yōhei Arai (mecha design), Makoto Shirata (BG concept artist), Yutaka Ōnishi (matte paint director), Ryū Sakamoto (art, setting), and Akemi Nagao (color design). The opening theme is "Wagamama de Gomakasanaide" by The Oral Cigarettes. The ending theme is "Curtain Call" by Weaver. The series premiered on Fuji TV's +Ultra timeslot from January 10 to March 28, 2019. The series was streamed on Netflix worldwide.

No.	Title	Written by	Original release date
1	"Shibuya Transfer" "Shibutani Tensou" (渋谷転送)	Makoto Fukami	January 10, 2019
In the year 2017, Daisuke Dojima, a sophomore student at Seisho Academy, has developed a hero complex after a mysterious woman named Milo once prophesied that he will protect his four childhood friends from a terrible danger someday. However, this caused Daisuke to be alienated from his childhood friends, especially when his teacher Yumiko Yazawa notices that he has no future career plans. Seven years ago, Daisuke's childhood friends Chang Gai Steiner, Chang Lu Steiner, Marin Temari and Keisaku Asano rescued Daisuke from being kidnapped in a shed with the help of Milo, who provided a cover story for the five to tell the police. In the present, Daisuke advices his uncle Mikio Dojima to leave the hometown of Shibuya. At school, Daisuke, Gai, Lu, Marin and Keisaku learn that they all received an anonymous text message during the previous night, warning them about the terrible danger. Suddenly, an earthquake causes Shibuya to transfer into a post-apocalypse, and half of the school building disappears. A mechanical monster called a Revision begins attacking the students on the school rooftop, in which some are slaughtered and others are captured. Fortunately, Milo arrives to incapacitate the Revision before grasping the situation. While Gai, Lu, Marin and Keisaku bring the surviving students to the school gymnasium, Mio leads Daisuke to a mecha called a String Puppet, which is capable of battling Revisions.
2	"Heroic Desire" "Yuusha Ganbou" (勇者願望)	Makoto Fukami, Asaura	January 17, 2019
After calibrating himself to the String Puppet, Daisuke fights the Revision. Meanwhile, mayor Seiichirō Muta starts making preparations for disaster control. Going against Milo's advice, Daisuke eventually destroys the Revision after releasing the students along with Yumiko held captive inside its bio-cage, a sort of cryogenic chamber. At the Shibuya Police Station, police chief Ryōhei Kuroiwa receives security footage of Daisuke fighting the Revision. Milo informs Daisuke, Gai, Lu, Marin and Keisaku that this is the first time that she has met them. Daisuke, Milo, Gai, Lu, Marin and Keisaku are then escorted by police officer Kanae Izumi to the Shibuya Police Station, where they are brought to the newly established provisional government. Milo reveals that she is an agent from an organization called AHRV, explaining that Shibuya is stranded in the year 2388. As the people of Shibuya descends into chaos and panic, Milo says that AHRV is executing a plan to return Shibuya to its original era. However, the catch is that everything rests on the shoulders of Daisuke and his childhood friends, who are the only ones chosen to pilot the three available String Puppets provided by Milo.
3	"Guardians" "Shugosha-tachi" (守護者たち)	Asaura	January 24, 2019
Izumi tells Daisuke, Gai, Lu, Marin and Keisaku that they are officially members of the Shibuya Defense Service (SDS). Milo orders Daisuke to provide cover for her, while Izumi drives Gai, Lu, Marin and Keisaku to an abandoned building in Sangenjaya, where they must retrieve the two remaining String Puppets, also known as Anti-Revisions Wearable Combat Systems. Meanwhile, Kuroiwa and Muta have opposing views on how to deal with the Revisions. Milo explains that Shibuya caused a pandemic that affected the future. After saying that Shibuya being transported into the future was already predicted by AHRV, Milo reveals that she can leap through time in the past. When Gai points out that the past Milo had a gunshot wound, this raises the question if the present Milo is the same woman. Gai recalls that the past Milo told him to doubt everything, while Keisaku recalls that the past Milo told him to accept everything. The Revisions come out of hiding and start attacking. Luckily, Gai and Lu pilot the two remaining String Puppets, covering for Daisuke and Milo. Daisuke is amazed that Gai and Lu can already pilot their String Puppets so well. Muta is later approached by Chiharu Isurugi, a member of the Revisions in human form, about changing the past in order to change the future.
4	"First Return Plan" "Daiichiji Kikan Keikaku" (第1次帰還計画)	Asaura, Kou Kimura	January 31, 2019
Muta announces that the provisional government will confiscate the String Puppets in order to cooperate and negotiate with the Revisions. Keisaku and his mother Yoshie Asano are selected to be in the first group of civilians in the repatriation list. Daisuke encounters Nicholas Satō, a member of the Revisions in the form of an anthropomorphic dog plushie. Nicholas disappears after he proclaims that Milo is the enemy. Meanwhile, Milo explains to Kuroiwa and Izumi that destroying the enemy's quantum brain, which can perceive two different time periods simultaneously, can restore Shibuya to the present time in theory. Muta then confines Milo in the interrogation room after the Revisions warned him about her. Chiharu and Nicholas return to their hideout, where Mukyu Isurugi, another member of the Revisions in human form, awaits for Chiharu's new body to be complete with an artificial quantum brain. The Revisions created the repatriation list in order to collect material for the artificial quantum brain. Gai, Lu and Marin hijack and activate the confiscated String Puppets, while Daisuke liberates Milo from the interrogation room. Kuroiwa arrests Muta for aiding and abetting the Revisions. Daisuke arrives and pilots a String Puppet, assisting Gai and Lu in fending off the Revisions. Although Mikio and Yoshie were among the people who were taken by the Revisions, Milo informs Daisuke, Gai, Lu, Marin and Keisaku that she was recently briefed of a mission to save them in the past, meaning that she is the genuine Milo.
5	"Appearance of the Future" "Mirai no Sugata" (未来の姿)	Makoto Fukami	February 7, 2019
Thanks to the SDS, Shibuya is now using electricity provided by the power source unit of the String Puppets, which looks like a giant cube. While on patrol, Daisuke and Keisaku reminisce about a harmless prank in the past, while Milo and Gai urge them to stay on task. Kuroiwa confines Muta in a holding cell, promising that he will find a way to return Shibuya to the present. Meanwhile, Lu, Marin and Izumi enjoy a bath together. Kuroiwa later assigns Gai as the official leader of the SDS, and the first mission is to assemble a search party to find the hideout of the Revisions. When Marin remembers that today is Daisuke's birthday, Lu recalls that Marin used to have a crush on Daisuke. Izumi decides to bring up the idea of baking a cake for Daisuke during a meeting with Milo, Gai and Kuroiwa. Daisuke, Gai and Keisaku are dispatched to take out some Revisions. After realizing that the intersection between the two time periods will dissolve in a few days, Milo is confronted by Chiharu on a helipad. As explained, AHRV predicted that Shibuya will be destroyed after the Revisions will fail in transporting Shibuya fully in the future. Marin overhears that the Revisions were once humans whose minds melded with machines.
6	"Because They're Humans..." "Datte, Hito Dakara..." (だって, 人だから...)	Makoto Fukami	February 14, 2019
At night, Marin informs Daisuke, Gai, Lu and Keisaku that they have been killing people all this time, to which Milo admits that the Revisions were once humans. Milo explains that the pandemic caused the human race to split between AHRV and the Revisions, the two factions who are respectively immune and susceptible. Moreover, the Revisions survive by collecting cells from humans resistant to the virus. The next morning, Izumi reports to Kuroiwa that Mikio is among the surviving returnees. Mikio believes that he was captured somewhere in the north, while Milo deduces that the Revisions tried to capture their ancestors immune to the virus. Marin questions if Daisuke does not want to return to the present, but Daisuke believes that he has a purpose ever since Milo first showed up at the school. Yumiko briefly tells Daisuke that she is counting on him to protect her. As Daisuke and Keisaku pilot two String Puppets without permission and prepare to head north, Daisuke comes across a Gespenst, a swift and intelligent machine that resembles a scorpion. The Gespenst repeatedly belittles Daisuke and relentlessly damages the String Puppet before disappearing. As a result, Kuroiwa confines Daisuke and Keisaku in holding cells for violating protocol, while Izumi says that Milo may be able to repair the damaged String Puppet.
7	"Midnight Rhapsody" "Mayonaka no Kyoushikyoku" (真夜中の狂詩曲)	Kou Kimura	February 21, 2019
While in his holding cell, Daisuke recounts all the sacrifices made for his destiny to become a reality. Keisaku is released from his holding cell after he writes an apology letter for disobeying orders. During a provisional government meeting, Milo confirms from Kuroiwa about the nature of the Revisions and the purpose of the String Puppets. Lu and Marin storm out and Keisaku follows them after Milo admits that she previously collected data on the SDS prior to them being assigned as the potential pilots of the String Puppets. Meanwhile, Chiharu, Mukyu and Nicholas have assembled everything for Chiharu's new body, which will give only Chiharu the ability to leap through time in the past. Mikio and Izumi talk some sense into Daisuke, mentioning that Marin initially hated the thought of piloting a String Puppet. Keisaku and Marin learn that Milo is 19 years old and that her whole family is dead. Milo also reveals that the damaged String Puppet can be repaired using the corpse of a Revision. Nicholas briefly approaches Daisuke, proclaiming that Shibuya will be fixed to the year 2388. With the damaged String Puppet now repaired, Kuroiwa allows Gai, Lu, Marin and Keisaku to vote on whether or not Daisuke should join them on the mission to infiltrate the hideout of the Revisions. Daisuke is finally released from his holding cell, thanks to Lu, Keisaku and Marin voting in the affirmative.
8	"Operation Nephilim" "Operation Nephilim" (オペレーション・ネフィリム)	Asaura	February 28, 2019
Kuroiwa learns that Mikio wants to assemble a research team and examine the corpses of the Revisions. Daisuke, Milo, Gai, Lu, Marin, Keisaku and Izumi commence Operation Nephilim. Daisuke, Keisaku, Izumi and Marin will rescue the hostages and return to Shibuya, while Milo, Gai and Lu will locate and remotely detonate the artificial quantum brain. Before infiltrating the hideout of the Revisions, they huddle together and wish for a successful mission. When Yoshie is reportedly still missing on the ground floor, Daisuke and Keisaku go further inside. Meanwhile, Milo, Gai and Lu come face-to-face with Chiharu and Mukyu on the top floor. Keisaku realizes that Yoshie is being held inside a bio-cage, while Daisuke encounters Nicholas. As Nicholas transports into his true body to subdue Daisuke and Keisaku with gravity manipulation, Keisaku watches in horror as Yoshie dies right in front of him. Nicholas goes to the top floor and subdues Gai, while Chiharu transports into her new body. However, Chiharu is haunted by an enraged Keisaku, who proceeds to crush Chiharu's head. This immediately causes Keisaku to turn into a crystal orb. Milo retreats after detonating a bomb near Mukyu and Nicholas. In the aftermath, sixty hostages have been rescued, but the artificial quantum brain has not been demolished.
9	"Loss of Destiny" "Soushitsu no Unmei" (消失の運命)	Kou Kimura	March 7, 2019
Nicholas says that there is a way that he can time leap to the year 2010, and Mukyu agrees to prepare Nicholas for his new body. Milo informs Daisuke, Gai, Lu and Marin that Keisaku's soul is now trapped between space and time. Both Lu and Izumi are taken hostage by the government officials, forcing Kuroiwa to release Muta from his holding cell. Muta plans on reopening negotiations with the Revisions. Inside a classroom at Seisho Academy, Muta eventually holds Gai captive alongside Lu. Daisuke and Kuroiwa rescue Izumi from being isolated inside a dark office. Just as Nicholas arrives in the classroom, Daisuke, Kuroiwa and Izumi free Gai and Lu while taking Muta hostage. Unfortunately, Nicholas takes his leave after declining Daisuke's proposal to acquire a sample of the virus and return to the present in order to prevent the pandemic from happening. Both Kuroiwa and Muta end up shooting each other in the chest, in which Muta dies first. Before Kuroiwa dies, he says his final words to Gai, Lu, Marin, Daisuke and Izumi, encouraging them to believe in their destiny. Mukyu publicly announces that the ancestors of the Revisions found on the repatriation list must leave Shibuya immediately, while the other civilians will be seized without discrimination in a few hours.
10	"Everyone's City" "Minna no Machi" (みんなの街)	Makoto Fukami	March 14, 2019
Milo informs Daisuke, Gai, Lu, Marin and Izumi that her mission to time leap into the past is coming soon. The power source unit of the String Puppets is slowly depleting due to supplying energy to Shibuya, which means that the String Puppets can no longer be recharged. Lu snaps Daisuke and Gai out of their breaking point when they have already given up. The government officials plan to evacuate the civilians to the underground district. Before passing command to Izumi, Milo comes up with a strategy to lure the Revisions towards the underground district by using the civilians as bait. As she prepares for her mission, Milo reveals to Daisuke that the String Puppets were modeled after her late older sister. Daisuke, Gai, Lu and Marin do their best to fend off the Revisions inching closer to the underground district. As the Gespenst returns to battle Daisuke, Nicholas transports into his new body and tells Mukyu that he will merge with the crystal orb in order to escape from space and time. Yumiko saves Marin from being crushed by a Revision. Daisuke then realizes that the Gespenst might be Keisaku as it destroys the Revision before suddenly disappearing again. Several hours earlier, Milo shockingly learned that her mission is to eliminate Keisaku.
11	"The Last Hope" "Saigo no Kibou" (最後の希望)	Asaura, Kou Kimura	March 21, 2019
Daisuke wishes he could talk to Keisaku, but Gai mentions that the String Puppets no longer function anymore. During a provisional government meeting, Mikio suggests that the virus could be studied when Shibuya returns to the present, and perhaps this will prevent the pandemic from happening. Daisuke, Gai, Lu and Marin receive a voice message from Milo, who explains that her mission is to eliminate Keisaku. The voice message abruptly cuts off after AHRV predicted that Shibuya will be fixed to the future. Two weeks later, Mikio assembles Daisuke, Gai, Lu, Marin and Izumi, informing them that the power source unit of the String Puppets can be recharged, in which the civilians are placing their final hope on the SDS for the final mission. The rest of the voice message from Milo reveals that she is about to do something that goes against her role as an agent from AHRV. Mikio and Izumi escort Daisuke to the hideout of the Revisions. On the top floor, Daisuke hesitates to attack when Nicholas merges with the crystal orb, assuming the form of Keisaku. Nicholas destroys the artificial quantum brain before stabbing Mukyu in her true body. When Mikio and Izumi head back, Shibuya slowly begins returning to the present. Nicholas reveals that Keisaku was originally supposed to be first pilot, but AHRV messed up their prediction of the future. As Nicholas prepares to leap through time in the past, Daisuke gets caught in the orbit.
12	"Revert"	Makoto Fukami	March 28, 2019
Shibuya has returned to the present just as Mikio and Izumi make it back in time. Gai, Lu and Marin are relieved when Keisaku appears before them, but this is really Nicholas in disguise, who claims that Daisuke died during the kidnapping seven years ago. Meanwhile, Daisuke appears in a timeline seven years ago, where Keisaku was the victim of the kidnapping. Daisuke brings young Daisuke, Gai, Lu and Marin to the shed, where Milo prepares to kill Keisaku. As Daisuke rushes to stop Mio, Nicholas appears and takes young Daisuke hostage, as it is revealed that Nicholas divides his power to be in multiple places simultaneously. Daisuke and Milo work together to save young Daisuke and defeat Nicholas. However, not even a gunshot to the forehead can kill Nicholas, who reveals that he has failed many times to kill young Daisuke in other timelines. Milo kisses Daisuke on the forehead before he faces off against Nicholas in the form of the Gespenst. Outside of space and time, Daisuke manages to destroy the Gespenst, which separates the souls of Keisaku and Nicholas. As Keisaku and Nicholas gradually dissolve, Daisuke is saved by Gai, Lu and Marin waiting for him in the present. Three months since the Shibuya Time-Space Disaster, life in Shibuya reverts to normal for Daisuke, Gai, Lu and Marin. Elsewhere, Milo looks at a clock tower as reports of other areas have suddenly vanished around the world.

== Reception ==
Writing for Monsters and Critics, writer Patrick Frye compared the science fiction anime to the isekai genre "except that an entire city is thrown into a new world via time travel." Although the character development, plot twists, and CGI animation were praised, it's claimed the "biggest negatives centered around the protagonist Daisuke who suffers from an obsessive hero complex for most of the first season ... which made watching the first eight episodes feel grating or insufferable." In May 2019, Anime News Network listed Daisuke one of the most, "scrubbiest scrublord protagonists".
