= Akashic Re:cords =

2016 mobile video game

- Developer: Square Enix
- Publisher: Square Enix
- Artist: Nakaharu
- Writer: Shunsaku Yano
- Composer: Naoshi Mizuta
- Platforms: Android, iOS
- Release: JP: November 10, 2016
- Genre: Role-playing game
- Mode: Single-player

Akashic Re:cords (Japanese: アカシックリコード, Hepburn: Akashikku Rikōdo) is a Japanese role-playing video game developed by Square Enix and Kadokawa Games for Android and iOS platforms, which was first released on November 10, 2016. The game was initially described that "your imagination will become creations". The plot revolves a group of people that have signed a contract with the devil in order to regain the World of Books after it got invaded by the "Silverfish".

== Gameplay ==
In the game, the player takes the role of a male "Creator" who fights with his partners in battle. Akashic Re:cords features a Turn-Based system, and allows player to summon devils, each with a "genre": "Light Novel", "Otome", "SF", "Horror", "Mystery", and "Fantasy", to fight against monsters or fellow players in a real-time match. It also features an array of summons illustrated by various artists.

== Development ==
A teaser site was first opened in August 2016 by Square Enix, and it was later revealed to be a collaboration project with Kadokawa Games. The staff includes Nakaharu as character designer, Shunsaku Yano as the writer, and Ryo Mizuno. The group band The Oral Cigarettes perform the game's theme tune entitled "Catch Me".
