= Lauren Landa =

American voice actress (born 1988)

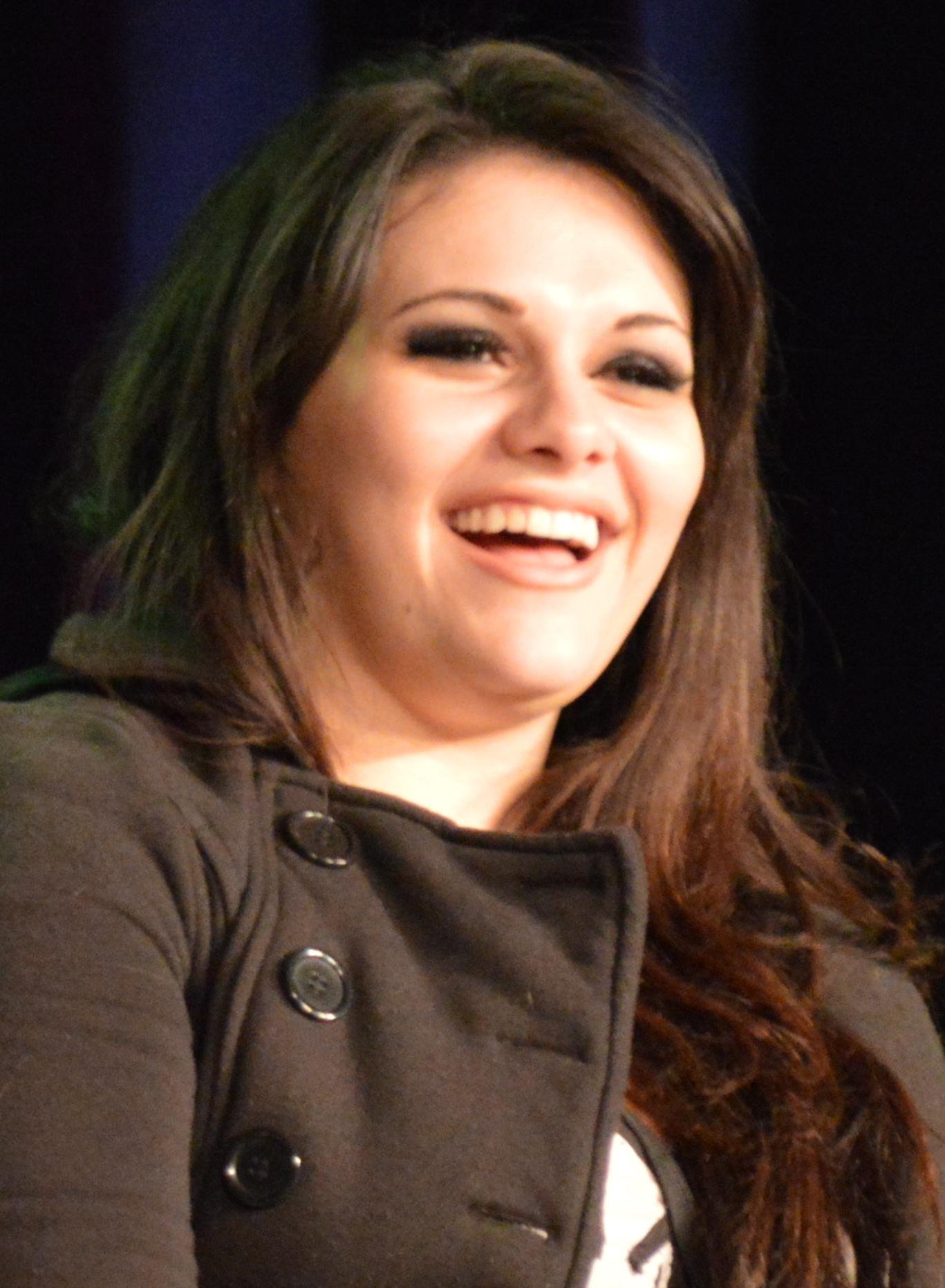
- Landa at the Magic City Comic Con in 2015
- Born: Lauren Anne Landa; June 9, 1988 (age 38); Los Angeles, California, U.S.
- Occupation: Voice actress
- Years active: 2007–present

Lauren Anne Landa (born June 9, 1988) is an American voice actress who has worked on English dubs for Japanese anime and video games.

== Career ==
Landa's most known roles are Litchi Faye-Ling in the BlazBlue fighting video game series and Leia Rolando in Tales of Xillia. She also voiced Arf and Chrono in the Magical Girl Lyrical Nanoha series; Kirche in The Familiar of Zero, Kasumi since Dead or Alive 5, Kyoko Sakura in Puella Magi Madoka Magica, Nao Tomori in Charlotte, Mio Naruse in The Testament of Sister New Devil, Xenovia Quarta in High School DxD, Annie Leonhart in Attack on Titan, and Michiru Kaioh/Sailor Neptune in the Viz Media dub of Sailor Moon as well as Merlin in The Seven Deadly Sins.

== Filmography ==
=== Anime ===
List of dubbing performances in anime
Year	Title	Role	Notes	Source
2008	Aika R-16: Virgin Mission	Aki		
2008	Magical Girl Lyrical Nanoha series	Arf, Chrono Harlown	2 seasons	Press
2008	Tweeny Witches	Braunn		Press
2012	Puella Magi Madoka Magica	Kyoko Sakura		
2013	Ikki Tousen series	Sonken Chubo	Great Guardians and Xtreme Xecutor	
2013–2020	Sword Art Online	Sakuya		
2014–2024	Attack on Titan	Annie Leonhart	4 seasons, also Junior High	
2014	The Familiar of Zero	Kirche		Press
2014–18	High School DxD	Xenovia Quarta	As Ramona Newel	
2015	BlazBlue Alter Memory	Litchi Faye-Ling		
2015	Fate/stay night: Unlimited Blade Works	Luviagelita Edelfelt		
2015	Noragami	Nora	also Aragoto	
2015	Riddle Story of Devil	Nio Hashiri		
2015–21	The Seven Deadly Sins	Merlin / Sennett		
2016	Hunter x Hunter	Kalluto Zoldyck		
2016	Lord Marksman and Vanadis	Elizaveta Fomina		
2016	Sailor Moon series	Sailor Neptune	Viz Media dub	
2016	Charlotte	Nao Tomori		
2016	March Comes In like a Lion	Kyoko Koda		
2017	The Testament of Sister New Devil	Mio Naruse		
2017	Blue Exorcist: Kyoto Saga	Torako Suguro, Nishiki Hojo		
2017	Dragon Ball Z Kai: The Final Chapters	Bulla		
2017	Fate/Apocrypha	Celenike Icecolle Yggdmillenia		
2018	Sword Gai: The Animation	Himiko		
2019	Dragon Ball Super	Bikal		
2020	In/Spectre	Saki Yumihara		
2020	Beastars	Juno, Ellen		
2020	Dorohedoro	Asuka		
2020	Fly Me to the Moon	Tsukasa Tsukuyomi		
2020	Gundam Build Divers Re:Rise	May		
2021	Diary of Our Days at the Breakwater	Makoto Ohno		
2021	Kuroko's Basketball	Masako Araki	Netflix English Dub	
2021	Scarlet Nexus	Kyoka Eden		
2021	Sonny Boy	Machi		
2021	King's Raid: Successors of the Will	Lupine		
2022	Odd Taxi	Miho Shirakawa	Crunchyroll dub	
2023	My Love Story with Yamada-kun at Lv999	Momoko Maeda		
2025	Kowloon Generic Romance	Reiko		
2026	Chainsmoker Cat	Hameneko		

=== Animation ===
List of voice performances in animation
Year	Title	Role	Notes	Source
TBA	Far-Fetched Show	Blair		
2020–present	Miraculous: Tales of Ladybug & Cat Noir	Stompp, Sabrina Raincomprix/Miss Hound, Pollen	Replaced Cassandra Lee Morris as Sabrina and Pollen in season 4 onwards	

=== Films ===
List of voice performances in anime films
Year	Title	Role	Notes	Source
2012	Redline	Boiboi		Press
2014	Puella Magi Madoka Magica: The Movie series	Kyoko Sakura	3 films	
2014	One Piece Film: Z	Ain		
2017	Sword Art Online The Movie: Ordinal Scale	Sakuya		
2018	Sailor Moon S: The Movie	Michiru Kaioh/Sailor Neptune		
2018	Sailor Moon SuperS: The Movie	Michiru Kaioh/Sailor Neptune		
2018	The Seven Deadly Sins the Movie: Prisoners of the Sky	Merlin		
2021	Sailor Moon Eternal	Michiru Kaioh/Super Sailor Neptune	Netflix dub	2-Part Film, Season 4 of Sailor Moon Crystal (Dead Moon arc)

=== Video games ===
List of voice performances in video games
Year	Title	Role	Notes	Source
2008	Luminous Arc 2	Rina		Press
2008	Rondo of Swords	Aegil, Cotton, Sasha		Press
2008	Summon Night: Twin Age	Lila		Press
2009	BlazBlue series	Litchi Faye-Ling		Press
2011	Rune Factory: Tides of Destiny	Electra de Sainte-Coquille		
2012	Soulcalibur V	Yan Leixia		Press
2012	Hyperdimension Neptunia mk2	Cave		
2012	Ninja Gaiden 3: Razor's Edge	Kasumi		
2012	Skullgirls	Squigly, Venus		
2012	Tales of Graces f	Little Queen		Press
2012–present	Dead or Alive series	Kasumi/Phase 4	starting from Dead or Alive 5	Press
2013	Dynasty Warriors 8	Lu Lingqi		
2013	Tales of Xillia	Leia Rolando		Press
2014	Drakengard 3	One		Press
2014	Conception II: Children of the Seven Stars	Clau		
2014	Mugen Souls Z	Onluka		
2014	Super Smash Bros. for Nintendo 3DS and Wii U	Robin (Female)		
2015	Hyperdevotion Noire: Goddess Black Heart	Sango		
2015	The Awakened Fate Ultimatum	Mariel Soraumi		
2015	Shin Megami Tensei: Devil Survivor 2	Io Nitta	3DS port, Record Breaker	
2015	Stella Glow	Medea		
2015	Lost Dimension	Yoko Tachibana		
2015	Xenoblade Chronicles X	Additional voices		
2016	Street Fighter V	Karin Kanzuki, Mel		
2016	God Eater 2: Rage Burst	Urara Hoshino		
2017	Puyo Puyo Tetris	Witch, Lidelle		
2017	Akiba's Beat	Yoshino Saionji		
2017	Fire Emblem Echoes: Shadows of Valentia	Yuzu		
2017	Fire Emblem Heroes	Robin (Female)		
2017	Nier: Automata	Additional voices		
2018	Monster Hunter World	Additional voices		
2018	Super Smash Bros. Ultimate	Robin (Female)		
2018	Radiant Historia: Perfect Chronology	Raynie		
2018	Fist of the North Star: Lost Paradise	Laila		
2019	Conception Plus: Maidens of the Twelve Stars	Arie		
2019	Shenmue III	Lin Shiling, Additional voices		
2021	Nier Replicant ver.1.22474487139...	Additional voices		
2021	Scarlet Nexus	Kyoka Eden		
2022	Tower of Fantasy	Dr. Claire	Level Infinite	
2022	Goddess of Victory: Nikke	Ludmilla, Laplace	Credited in-game	
2023	Trinity Trigger	Coeur De Rosa, Lux, Quinn		
2023	Master Detective Archives: Rain Code	Melami Goldmine		
2023	Eternights	Delia		
2024	Unicorn Overlord	Mercenaries (Type A), additional voices		
2024	Puyo Puyo Puzzle Pop	Lidelle, Witch		
2024	Romancing SaGa 2: Revenge of the Seven	Liza/Light Infantry (F)		
2025	Raidou Remastered: The Mystery of the Soulless Army	Shizu Iida		
2026	Code Vein II	Protagonist		

Preceded by Barbara Radecki	Voice of Sailor Neptune; 2016-present	Succeeded by None
