= Scarlet Nexus (TV series) =

Japanese anime television series

- Genre: Sci-fi; Fantasy; Action
- Based on: Scarlet Nexus by Bandai Namco Entertainment
- Developed by: Yōichi Katō; Toshizō Nemoto
- Directed by: Hiroyuki Nishimura
- Voices of: Asami Seto; Junya Enoki
- Music by: Hironori Anazawa
- Opening theme: "Red Criminal" by The Oral Cigarettes; "MACHINEGUN" by The Oral Cigarettes
- Ending theme: "Fire" by Yamato.S; "Stranger" by Ayumu Imazu
- Country of origin: Japan
- Original language: Japanese
- No. of episodes: 26 (list of episodes)

Production
- Executive producers: Daisuke Masui; Naohiro Ogata
- Producers: Keita Iizuka; Kiyoshi Tsukamoto
- Cinematography: Daichi Iseki
- Animator: Sunrise
- Editor: Masato Yoshitake
- Running time: 24 minutes
- Production company: SCARLET NEXUS Production Committee

Original release
- Network: Tokyo MX, BS11, SUN
- Release: July 1 – December 23, 2021

Scarlet Nexus is a Japanese anime television series adaptation of the video game of the same name. It is produced by Sunrise and aired from July to December 2021.

== Plot ==
Set in the near future and an alternate reality where humanity develops technology and forms society based on the substances found in human brains. These substances also grant humans extrasensory superpowers. The Other Suppression Force (OSF) recruits members with psionic abilities to protect humanity from the Others, mindless mutants descending from the Extinction Belt.

== Characters ==
Yuito Sumeragi (ユイト・スメラギ)
Voiced by: Junya Enoki (Japanese); Chris Hackney (English)
The second son of the prestigious Sumeragi family. As a child, he was saved by an OSF soldier, which inspired him to join the OSF later on. He possesses the psionic ability of gravikinesis, allowing him to control the movement of all surrounding objects. While his psionic aptitude is pretty low, he compensates for it with cooperation with his teammates and mastery over swordsmanship. He is assigned to Seto Platoon alongside his friend, Nagi. In his first mission, he realizes it was Kasane who saved his life back then, and decides to help her return her sister Naomi back to her human form after Naomi is turned into an Other. Yuito's psionic powers become unstable, and the only way to stay active is by consuming a drug made from human blood and brains. He also learns he was born as a "dud", a person without psionic powers, and was subjected to experiments in order to receive psionic powers in the first place. Unfortunately, repeated use of his psionic powers is causing damage to accumulate in his brain, which explains Yuito's power shortages and memory lapses. Furthermore, the medicine he was prescribed is only a temporary measure and, sooner or later, he will lose both his powers and his memories. He later takes action against the corruption of New Himuka, which brands him as a traitor and forces him and his platoon to escape from Suoh and make their way to Togetsu. His new mission, however, causes him and his platoon to cross paths with Kasane's platoon yet again, and once both platoons escape from Togetsu, they exchange information on what they have learned. He and Kasane agree to try and convince their respective factions to thwart Togetsu's plans. Upon their arrival at Suoh, however, Yuito is forced to fight Nagi yet again, a battle that ends in Nagi's death. Furious, Yuito confronts Kaito about Nagi's brainwashing, when his brother reveals that his plan is to turn Yuito into a weapon to destroy the humans still living on the Moon. Yuito, realizing that his brother won't change his ways, fully commits to exposing New Himuka's corruption. His plan to expose the government's corruption succeeds in starting up a revolution, but Karen forcibly copies Yuito's gravikinesis and causes him severe brain damage that threatens to erase him from existence. It's only through the efforts of both his and Kasane's platoons that Yuito is saved. Yuito and Kasane later convince Karen to help them destroy the Kunad Gate, at the expense of Karen's existence. With the crisis finally over, Yuito formally resigns from the OSF and decides to become a politician, like his father and brother before him.
An older version of Yuito exists in the future of 2070. After Seiran enacted a coup d'etat against the New Himukan government, Yuito was considered a hero for his efforts to suppress the rebellion, even though his gravikinesis caused the Kunad Gate to grow larger and more dangerous. Although his death would cause the Kunad Gate to close, the government convinced him not to take his own life and so he continued the government's research, turning countless humans into Others. Once Kasane arrives into the future, he goads the Others into killing him and begs Kasane to kill his younger self in order to avert this catastrophic future. With the Kunad Gate destroyed in the present, this version of Yuito ceases to exist.
Kasane Randall (カサネ・ランドール, Kasane Randōru)
Voiced by: Asami Seto (Japanese); Erica Mendez (English)
An elite soldier with superb fighting skills and power, she was scouted by the OSF and has graduated at the top of her class. Like Yuito, she possesses the psionic ability of gravikinesis. She is the adopted child of the prestigious Randall family and the younger sister of Naomi, whom Kasane protects with the utmost dedication. Upon graduating, she and Naomi are assigned to the OSF's Kyoka Platoon. Through unknown circumstances, she saved Yuito's life back when he was five years old, inspiring him to join the OSF. Over the course of her life, she has been haunted by dreams about a mysterious voice telling her to hold on to the red strings. In the present, she doesn't immediately trust Yuito and attempts to fight him personally to verify if he's worthy of Naomi's love. Unfortunately, during a mission to hunt Others down, Naomi is turned into an Other and forcibly taken away by the group Seiran. When Naomi is officially declared killed in action, Kasane is disowned by her family for her failure to protect Naomi. Even so, Kasane decides to find a way to turn Naomi back into a human. Her latent power of gravikinesis takes her into the dark future of the year 2070, where she meets an older version of Yuito, who reveals the truth about Kasane's powers and begs her to kill his past self in order to avert this dark future from coming to pass. Upon returning to the present, Kasane is drafted into Seiran after Karen promises to find a way to return Naomi to her human form. Unfortunately, still struggling with the task of killing Yuito, she later discovers that Naomi is only capable of human communication if she consumes a drug made from human blood and brains. She and her group ultimately decide to travel to Togetsu, an independent city outside the jurisdictions of both New Himuka and Seiran, to find a way to save Naomi. Once they reach the entrance, the denizens of Togetsu tell Kasane that she was born in Togetsu and the story of her parents being killed by Others was a fabrication by New Himuka aimed at harvesting her psionic power. Unfortunately, she is captured by Togetsu forces and through a dream, she discovers that she herself is actually one of many Design Children genetically engineered by Togetsu in order to harness the red strings of time and space. Once Yuito's platoon reaches Togetsu, however, both platoons help each other escape and once they reach a shelter, they exchange information on what they have learned. She and Yuito agree to convince their governments to thwart Togetsu's plans, but she is later forced to endure Naomi's death. She later discovers that she and Yuito share the same mother, Wakana Sumeragi, who helps them shut down the Kunad Gate at the cost of her own life. With the Kunad Gate finally closed, Kasane joins a space project to explore the moon.
Arashi Spring (アラシ・スプリング, Arashi Supuringu)
Voiced by: Yui Horie (Japanese); Reba Buhr (English)
An OSF soldier and Fubuki's elder sister. She possesses the psionic ability of hypervelocity, allowing her to move at super-speed. While she exerts an energetic public persona, she is actually very lazy, which earned her the nickname "Lazy-Ara".
Gemma Garrison (ゲンマ・ギャリソン, Genma Gyarison)
Voiced by: Ryōta Takeuchi (Japanese); Aaron Hendricks (English)
An OSF soldier who possesses the psionic ability of sclerokinesis, allowing him to harden his body and increase his defensive systems exponentially. In reality, Gemma is actually over 50 despite his young appearance because of the anti-aging drugs all OSF soldiers are required to take to retain their psionic powers.
Hanabi Ichijo (ハナビ・イチジョウ, Hanabi Ichijō)
Voiced by: Tomomi Mineuchi (Japanese); Megan Taylor Harvey (English)
Yuito's childhood friend and fellow OSF soldier who was scouted into the organization at a young age. She possesses the psionic ability of pyrokinesis, allowing her to conjure and control fire at will. She is assigned into the same platoon as Yuito and Nagi.
Kagero Donne (カゲロウ・ダン, Kagerō Dan)
Voiced by: Daisuke Namikawa (Japanese); Chris Patton (English)
An OSF soldier. He possesses the psionic ability of invisibility. He was born on the city of Togetsu and was sent to Suoh as an emissary of Togetsu's faith but later grew disillusioned with it and cut ties with Togetsu. He later reveals himself to be a member of the original group of immigrants that came from the Moon 2,000 years ago. He used to know Yakumo Sumeragi, founder of New Himuka, and became one of the founding members of Togetsu, but upon hearing of their plan to rewrite history, he chose to betray them, knowning that if Togetsu's plan succeeded, it would lead to the temporal erasure of his family, which still exists back in the Moon. He was assigned to kill Yuito's father but instead attempted to hide him until the Kunad Gate crisis blew over, but Joe was killed by Others. After the Kunad Gate is closed, Kagero reveals his true name to be Shin Daniel and is re-assigned to help the OSF dismantle the Togetsu faith and join a moon exploration journey.
Kyoka Eden (キョウカ・エデン, Kyōka Eden)
Voiced by: Yumi Hara (Japanese); Lauren Landa (English)
An OSF Captain and commanding officer of Kasane and Naomi's platoon. She possesses the psionic ability of duplication, allowing her to duplicate objects as well as herself. She is later revealed to be a double agent working for Togetsu and she goads Kasane into travelling to Togetsu for some unspecified purpose. Once Togetsu captures Kasane's platoon, Yuito and his friends discover that Kyoka is a Design Child, created from the cells of Dr. Hitoyo Pope, a scientist associated with Togetsu who died thousands of years ago. When both platoons escape from Togetsu, Kasane convinces her to switch sides and to accept herself as her own person rather than just an embodiment of Pope's will. With the Kunad Gate finally closed, Kyoka is re-assigned to help dismantle
Luka Travers (ルカ・トラヴァース, Ruka Toravāsu)
Voiced by: Chinatsu Akasaki (Japanese); Zach Aguilar (English)
An OSF Septentrion and the younger brother of Karen Travers. He possesses the psionic ability of teleportation. He becomes aware of his brother's terrorist ambitions and decides to help the Seto and Kyoka platoons escape from Karen's ambush. He later joins Yuito's platoons both to stop Togetsu and Karen's plans to abuse the power of the red strings to remake the universe. Luka's friends are able to convince Karen to use the red strings to destroy the Kunad Gate, at the cost of Karen sacrificing his own existence and causing everyone, including Luka, to forget he ever existed. Afterwards, Luka is promoted to regiment commander.
Shiden Ritter (シデン・リッター, Shiden Rittā)
Voiced by: Kengo Kawanishi (Japanese); Phil Song (English)
An OSF soldier in Kyoka's platoon. He possesses the psionic ability of electrokinesis, allowing him to conjure and control electricity at will. He looks up to Seto since they both share the same psionic ability, and was gifted a mask similar to Seto's before his death. After the Kunad Gate crisis is solved, he is promoted to commander of his own squad.
Tsugumi Nazar (ツグミ・ナザール, Tsugumi Nazāru)
Voiced by: Marika Kouno (Japanese); Xanthe Huynh (English)
An OSF soldier in Seto's platoon and a friend of Kagero. She possesses the psionic ability of clairvoyance, allowing her to detect enemies that are typically unable to be seen by the human eye.
Nagi Karman (ナギ・カーマン, Nagi Kāman)
Voiced by: Yuma Uchida (Japanese); Griffin Burns (English)
Yuito's best friend and fellow OSF soldier. He possesses the psionic ability of aerokinesis, allowing him to conjure and control wind at will. He is assigned to Seto Platoon alongside Yuito and develops feelings for Naomi Randall, until he is left traumatized by her transformation into an Other. After a brief stay at the hospital, he returns to active duty, with everyone unaware that he has undergone personality rehabilitation. At Kunad Highway, Nagi's brainwashing ultimately claims Seto's life. New Himuka forces Nagi, who is still struggling to break free from his brainwashing, to fight Yuito multiple times. During their final confrontation, Yuito lures Nagi to the secret place they used to train back when they were cadets and the mental struggle ultimately claims Nagi's life. Yuito mournfully lays Nagi's body to rest in their secret place and fully commits towards exposing the government's corruption.
Naomi Randall (ナオミ・ランドール, Naomi Randōru)
Voiced by: Asuka Nishi (Japanese); Jennifer Losi (English)
The biological child of the prestigious Randall family. She is Kasane's adoptive older sister and fellow OSF soldier. Unlike the stoic Kasane, Naomi is friendly and approachable to Yuito and Nagi. She possesses the psionic ability of precognition, allowing her to peer into the future. Alongside Kasane, she is assigned to Kyoka Platoon. Kasane is aware of Naomi's crush on Yuito and personally performs a background check on him to verify whether or not he is worthy of Naomi. Unfortunately, during a deployment at the abandoned subway, Naomi is shot and metamorphs into an Other. Before she can do serious damage, however, she is forcibly taken away by the Seiran branch of the OSF. Naomi is held at one of Seiran's research facility, where she is forcibly injected with medicines made from psionic brains. Such medicines allow her to retain some semblance of her human sapience, but they are just a temporary measure and Karen believes that the only way for Naomi to be human again is through Kasane's psionic powers. Unfortuantely, she is forced to sacrifice her life to protect Kasane from Togetsu.
Fubuki Spring (フブキ・スプリング, Fubuki Supuringu)
Voiced by: Isshin Chiba (Japanese); Chris Cason (English)
A Septentrion and a Major General of the OSF and Arashi's younger brother. He possesses the psionic ability of cryokinesis, allowing him to conjure and control ice at will. He was a childhood friend to Karen and Luka and bethroted to Alice, until her tragic transformation into an Other. Unnerved by the lengths Karen was willing to undertake in order to save Alice, Fubuki decided to join Yuito and Kasane's attempts to stop him and convinces him to honor Alice's wish to save the world. The plan to shut down the Kunad Gate is successful, but Karen sacrifices his own life to save Alice, erasing everyone's memories of him, Fubuki included.
Karen Travers (カレン・トラヴァース, Karen Toravāsu)
Voiced by: Nobuyuki Hiyama (Japanese); Armen Taylor (English)
A Septentrion and a Major General of the OSF and Luka's brother. Karen is a "brain eater", which allows him to copy the psionic abilities of anyone he touches. He has lost faith in the New Himuka government and allies with Seiran to change the country. This later to be revealed to be a ruse, as Karen actually wants the power of the red strings possessed by Yuito and Kasane in order to turn back time and save Alice, a woman he loved in a previous life. He has already failed multiple times in the past and the events of the series are actually his latest attempt to save Alice. He steals the psionic powers of both Kasane and Yuito to access the red strings of time and open a portal to the past, causing severe brain damage to Yuito in the process. A version of Karen who has merged with the computer system Arahabaki forces Karen to admit that there is no way to save Alice and Karen willingly surrenders himself to the OSF in order to help shut down the Kunad Gate. During the event, however, Karen sacrifices his life to remove himself from the timeline and resurrect Alice, causing everyone, except Yuito and Kasane, to forget he ever existed.
Wataru Frazer (ワタル・フレイザー, Wataru Fureizā)
Voiced by: Kengo Takanashi (Japanese); Aaron Campbell (English)
An OSF soldier who serves as the Operator of Seto (now Yuito) Platoon. He is the twin brother of Haruka, whom they both share the same psionic ability of telepathy.
Haruka Frazer (ハルカ・フレイザー, Haruka Fureizā)
Voiced by: Tomoyo Kurosawa (Japanese); Celeste Henderson (English)
An OSF soldier who serves as the Operator of Kyoka Platoon. She is the twin sister of Wataru, whom they both share the same psionic ability of telepathy.
Seto Narukami (セト・ナルカミ)
Voiced by: Hiroki Takahashi (Japanese); Phillip Reich (English)
A OSF Major. Like Shiden, he possesses the psionic ability of electrokinesis, and is the Captain of Yuito and Nagi's platoon. Seto is a reliable commander to his subordinates, willing to lay down his life to protect them. During Karen's initial revolution on Kunad Highway, Seto is heroically killed by Nagi attempting to protect Yuito and Kasane.
Kaito Sumeragi (カイト・スメラギ)
Voiced by: Chikahiro Kobayashi (Japanese); Zeno Robinson (English)
The Chief of the OSF and Yuito's elder brother. He is dedicated to following the dearest wish of Yakumo Sumeragi, the complete eradication of the humans still living on the Moon and plans to use Yuito as a weapon to achieve that goal. He also reveals to Yuito that Yakumo is still alive, kept in suspended animation in the depths of Suoh. After the Kunad Gate is closed, he is arrested and scheduled to stand trial for crimes against humanity.
Joe Sumeragi (ジョウ・スメラギ, Jō Sumeragi)
Voiced by: Tsutomu Isobe (Japanese); Charles Campbell (English)
The Chairman of the New Himuka Government, and the father of Yuito and Kaito. At first, he is opposed to Yuito's decision to join the OST but later begins to accept it and invites his sons to dinner so they can talk about their deceased mother. Unfortunately, before he can reconcile with Yuito, he is killed by Others during Seiran's revolt against the New Himuka government.

== Broadcast ==
On March 18, 2021, an anime television series adaptation produced by Sunrise was announced and streamed by Funimation outside of Asia. Following Sony's acquisition of Crunchyroll, the series was moved to Crunchyroll. Medialink licensed the anime in South and Southeast Asia. Hiroyuki Nishimura directed the series and Yōichi Katō, Toshizō Nemoto and Akiko Inoue wrote the series' scripts, with Nishimura and Yuji Ito designing the characters, and Hironori Anazawa composing the series' music. The series aired from July 1 to December 23, 2021. From episodes 1–13, the first opening theme is "Red Criminal" by The Oral Cigarettes, who previously performed the game's theme song, "Dream In Drive", while the first ending theme is "Fire" by Yamato(.S). From episodes 14–26, the second opening theme is "MACHINEGUN" by The Oral Cigarettes, while the second ending theme is "Stranger" by Ayumu Imazu.

On August 5, 2021, Funimation premiered an English dub of the series on their streaming service.
