= The Oral Cigarettes =

Japanese alternative rock band

- Origin: Nara, Japan
- Genres: Alternative rock; indie rock; progressive rock; emo; dance punk
- Years active: 2010–present
- Label: Pony Canyon (2023–present) A-Sketch (2012–2023)
- Members: Takuya; Akira; Shigenobu; Masaya
- Past members: Take
- Website: theoralcigarettes.com

The Oral Cigarettes (ジ・オーラル・シガレッツ), stylized in all caps is a four-member Japanese alternative rock band from Nara Prefecture, formed in 2010. The band signed to A-Sketch in 2012 and have released six studio albums, two independent albums, one demo album, one compilation album, three extended plays and nine singles.

== History ==
=== 2010–2012: Early years ===
The Oral Cigarettes were formed in Nara, Japan in 2010. In October 2010, The Oral Cigarettes released their first demo album Nōsatsu A-Type. Their first independent album, Tsuki ni Hoete, Aware..., was released in March 2011, followed by their second independent album, Shingetsu to Ohitsujiza, in February 2012. Their first independent single, "Kieta Mitai / N.I.R.A", was released in December 2012. In December 2012, they won the grand prize at a four company joint audition.

=== 2013–2015: Major label debut and The BKW Show!! ===
Their first EP, Orange no Nukegara, Watashi ga Ikita Ai no Akashi, was released with Mash A&R in August 2013. They held their first concert in June 2014. The group's first major label single, "Kishi Kaisei Story", was released with A-Sketch in July 2014. They held their first tour in July 2014. Their first major label album, The BKW Show!!, was released in November 2014. They released their second single, "Amy", in April 2015. Their third single, "Kyōran Hey Kids!!", which was used as the opening theme of Noragami Aragoto, was released in November 2015.

=== 2016–2017: Fixion and Unofficial ===
Their second album, Fixion, was released in January 2016. Their fourth single, "Dip-Bap" was released in August 2016, followed by their fifth single, "5150", in November 2016.

Their third album, Unofficial, was released in February 2017. They released their sixth single, "Tonariau / One's Again", in June 2017. Tonariau was used as the ending theme of Sagrada Reset. Their seventh single, "Black Memory", was released in September 2017.

=== 2018–2019: Kisses and Kills ===
Their fourth album, Kisses and Kills, was released in June 2018. Their eighth single, "Wagamama de Gomakasanaide", was released in March 2019, and was used as the opening theme of Revisions. The group's first compilation album, Before It's Too Late, was released in August 2019.

=== 2020–present: Suck My World and AlterGeist0000 ===
They released their fifth album, Suck My World, in April 2020. In April 2022, their second EP, Bullets into the Pipe, was released. In March 2024, their third EP, Marbles, was released.

In January 2025, the band released their sixth studio album, AlterGeist0000.

== Band members ==
Current members

- Takuya Yamanaka (山中 拓也) — lead vocals, guitar (2010–present)
- Akira Akirakani (あきらかにあきら) — bass, vocals (2010–present)
- Shigenobu Suzuki (鈴木 重伸) — guitar (2010–present)
- Masaya Nakanishi (中西 雅哉) — drums (2013–present)

Former members

- Take — drums (2010–2012)

Timeline

== Discography ==
=== Studio albums ===
| Title | Album details | Peak chart positions | |
| Title | Album details | JPN | JPN Hot |
|---|---|---|---|
| The BKW Show!! | Released: November 12, 2014; Label: A-Sketch; Formats: CD, digital download; Track listing: 1. Kirai (嫌い); 2. Monster Effect (モンスターエフェクト); 3. Helloween no Yoin (ハロウィンの余韻); 4. Starget; 5. Jidō Hanbaiki no Otoko (自動販売機の男); 6. Boku wa Yume wo Miru (僕は夢を見る); 7. Remake Sense (リメイクセンス); 8. Kishikaisei Story (起死回生Story); 9. Daimaō Sanjou (大魔王参上); 10. Tomeina Amayadori (透明な雨宿り) | 20 | — |
| Fixion | Released: January 5, 2016; Label: A-Sketch; Formats: CD, digital download; Track listing: 1. Kizukeyo Baby (気づけよBaby); 2. Kyōran Hey Kids!! (狂乱 Hey Kids!!); 3. Mirror; 4. Stay One; 5. Amy (エイミー); 6. Manner Mode (マナーモード); 7. Tōrisugita Kisetsu no Sora de (通り過ぎた季節の空で); 8. Kantannakoto (カンタンナコト); 9. A-E-U-I; 10. Everything | 6 | 8 |
| Unofficial | Released: February 2, 2017; Label: A-Sketch; Formats: CD, digital download; Track listing: 1. Licorice (リコリス); 2. Catch Me; 3. Itazura Show Time (悪戯ショータイム); 4. 5150; 5. WarWarWar; 6. Endroll (エンドロール); 7. Dip-Bap; 8. Shala La; 9. Futōmei na Yukigeshō (不透明な雪化粧); 10. Love | 3 | 5 |
| Kisses and Kills | Released: June 13, 2018; Label: A-Sketch; Formats: CD, digital download; Track listing: 1. Mō Īkai? (もういいかい?); 2. Black Memory; 3. Psychopath; 4. Ladies and Gentlemen; 5. What You Want; 6. Tonariau (トナリアウ); 7. Livelock Art (リブロックアート); 8. Yōshi Tanreina Uso (容姿端麗な嘘); 9. One's Again; 10. ReI | 1 | 1 |
| Suck My World | Released: April 29, 2020; Label: A-Sketch; Formats: CD, digital download | 1 | 1 |
| AlterGeist0000 | Released: January 22, 2025; Label: Pony Canyon; Formats: CD, digital download; Track listing: 1. Bitch!!; 2. Dikidandan; 3. Dunk feat. Masato (Coldrain); 4. Bug; 5. Under and Over; 6. OD; 7. Enemy feat. Kamui; 8. Soda; 9. Enchant; 10. Savior of My Life; 11. Yellow; 12. Shuu (愁); 13. See You Again | 8 | 65 |
"—" denotes releases that did not chart or were not released in that region.

=== Independent albums ===
| Title | Album details |
|---|---|
| Tsuki ni Hoete, Aware... (月に吠えて、哀・・・) | Released: March 12, 2011; Track listing: 1. Dawn (幕開け); 2. End of the Century (世紀末少年); 3. Small Devil Infection (小悪魔インフェクション); 4. I Have a Dream (僕は夢を見る); 5. Selection of 90 (九十の選択); 6. Kaze no Oto (カゼノオト); 7. Late Night Melody (夜更け奏で); 8. Barking of the Moon, Sorrow... (月の吠えて、哀・・・) |
| Shingetsu to Ohitsujiza (新月と牡羊座) | Released: February 12, 2012; Track listing: 1. Anti-grudgeist (逆恨み小僧); 2. Mist...; 3. Dancing Crazy Dolls (踊り狂う人形); 4. A Girl Who Caught in a Town (とある街で見かけた少女); 5. Aries Melody (牡羊座の奏で); 6. Writing of G (gの筆記); 7. Demon Lion Entry (大魔王参上); 8. Amy (エイミー) |

=== Compilation albums ===
| Title | Album details | Peak chart positions | |
| Title | Album details | JPN | JPN Hot |
|---|---|---|---|
| Before It's Too Late | Released: August 28, 2019; Label: A-Sketch; Formats: CD, digital download | 5 | 4 |

=== Demo albums ===
| Title | Album details |
|---|---|
| Nōsatsu A-Type (悩殺A-Type) | Released: October 10, 2010; Track listing: 1. Delusions Sex Theater (妄想SEX劇場); 2. I Have a Dream (僕は夢を見る); 3. Cazenooto (カゼノオト) |

=== Extended plays ===
| Title | EP details | Peak chart positions |
| Title | EP details | JPN |
|---|---|---|
| Orange no Nukegara, Watashi ga Ikita Ai no Akashi (オレンジの抜け殻、私が生きたアイの証) | Released: August 28, 2013; Label: Mash A&R; Formats: CD, digital download; Track listing: 1. Mist...; 2. Mr. Phantom (Mr.ファントム); 3. Hyōtanyama no Ekiinsan (瓢箪山の駅員さん); 4. Sakaurami Kozō (逆恨み小僧); 5. Kono Kisetsu ni Boku ga Utau Uta (この季節に僕が唄う歌); 6. Kijō no Kūron ni Imi o Nasu (机上の空論に意味を為す); 7. 30-Sai Dōgan (30歳童顔) | 95 |
| Bullets into the Pipe | Released: April 27, 2022; Label: A-Sketch; Formats: CD, digital download | — |
| Marbles | Released: March 13, 2024; Label: A-Sketch; Formats: CD, digital download | — |
"—" denotes releases that did not chart or were not released in that region.

=== Singles ===
| Title | Year | Peak chart positions | | Album |
| Title | Year | JPN | JPN Hot | Album |
|---|---|---|---|---|
| "Kieta Mitai" (キエタミタイ) | 2012 | — | — | Non-album singles |
| "N.I.R.A" | 2012 | — | — | Non-album singles |
| "Kishi Kaisei Story" (起死回生Story) | 2014 | 28 | 27 | The BKW Show!! |
| "Amy" (エイミー) | 2015 | 29 | 60 | Fixion |
| "Kyōran Hey Kids!!" (狂乱 Hey Kids!!) | 2015 | 19 | 24 | Fixion |
| "Dip-Bap" | 2016 | 12 | 24 | Unofficial |
| "5150" | 2016 | 10 | 28 | Unofficial |
| "Tonariau" (トナリアウ) | 2017 | 6 | 12 | Kisses and Kills |
| "One's Again" | 2017 | 6 | — | Kisses and Kills |
| "Black Memory" | 2017 | 3 | 4 | Kisses and Kills |
| "Wagamama de Gomakasanaide" (ワガママで誤魔化さないで) | 2019 | 5 | 14 | Suck My World |
"—" denotes releases that did not chart or were not released in that region.

=== Digital singles ===
| Title | Year | Peak chart positions | Album |
| Title | Year | JPN Hot | Album |
|---|---|---|---|
| "ReI" | 2018 | 94 | Kisses and Kills |
| "Don't You Think" feat. Lozareena | 2019 | — | Suck My World |
| "Shine Holder" | 2019 | 75 | Suck My World |
| "Tonight the Silence Kills Me with Your Fire" | 2020 | — | Suck My World |
| "Dream in Drive" | 2020 | — | Suck My World |
| "Naked" | 2020 | — | Suck My World |
| "Slowly But Surely I Go On" | 2020 | — | Suck My World |
| "Red Criminal" | 2021 | — | Marbles |
| "Machinegun" | 2021 | — | Marbles |
| "Enemy" feat. Kamui | 2022 | — | AlterGeist0000 |
| "Bug" | 2022 | — | AlterGeist0000 |
| "Enchant" | 2023 | — | AlterGeist0000 |
| "Yellow" | 2023 | — | AlterGeist0000 |
| "Dunk" feat. Masato | 2024 | — | AlterGeist0000 |
| "Under and Over" | 2024 | — | AlterGeist0000 |
| "Shu" | 2024 | — | AlterGeist0000 |
"—" denotes releases that did not chart or were not released in that region.

=== Other charted songs ===
| Title | Year | Peak chart positions | Album |
| Title | Year | JPN Hot | Album |
|---|---|---|---|
| "Starget" | 2014 | 74 | The BKW Show!! |

== Filmography ==
=== Video albums ===
| Title | Album details | Peak chart positions | |
| Title | Album details | JPN | |
| Title | Album details | DVD | Blu-ray |
|---|---|---|---|
| Unofficial Dining Tour 2017 at Nippon Budokan | Released: December 6, 2017; Label: A-Sketch; Formats: DVD, Blu-ray; Track listing: 1. 5150; 2. Shala La; 3. Kantannakoto (カンタンナコト); 4. Itazura Show Time (悪戯ショータイム); 5. Catch Me; 6. A-E-U-I; 7. Starget; 8. Kirai (嫌い); 9. Warwarwar; 10. Kizukeyo Baby (気づけよBaby); 11. Futōmei na Yukigeshō (不透明な雪化粧); 12. Endroll (エンドロール); 13. Mr. Phantom (Mr.ファントム); 14. Kishikaisei Story (起死回生Story); 15. Amy (エイミー); 16. Kyōran Hey Kids!! (狂乱 Hey Kids!!); 17. Dip-Bap; 18. Licorice (リコリス); 19. Love; 20. Tonariau (トナリアウ); 21. One's Again; 22. Unofficial Dining Tour at Nippon Budokan Documentary & Interview | 7 | 15 |

=== Soundtrack appearances ===
| Title | Year | Appearance |
|---|---|---|
| "Kishikaisei Story" (起死回生Story) | 2014 | Power Push!, July degree |
| "Amy" (エイミー) | 2015 | Japan Countdown, April's ending theme |
| "Amy" (エイミー) | 2015 | Kyoto Sports, April's ending theme |
| "Kyōran Hey Kids!!" (狂乱 Hey Kids!!) | 2015 | Noragami Aragoto, opening theme |
| "Kizukeyo Baby" (気づけよBaby) | 2016 | Japan Countdown, January's ending theme |
| "Dip-Bap" | 2016 | CDTV, September 8 opening theme |
| "Catch Me" | 2016 | Akashic Re:cords theme song |
| "Licorice" (リコリス) | 2017 | Japan Countdown, February's ending theme |
| "Tonariau" (トナリアウ) | 2017 | Sagrada Reset, ending theme |
| "Black Memory" | 2017 | Ajin: Demi-Human theme song |
| "Wagamama de Gomakasanaide" (ワガママで誤魔化さないで) | 2018 | Revisions, opening theme |
| "Red Criminal" | 2021 | Scarlet Nexus, opening theme |
| "Machinegun" | 2021 | Scarlet Nexus, opening theme |
| "Yellow" | 2023 | My Home Hero, ending theme |
| "Under and Over" | 2024 | Yakuza Fiancé, opening theme |
| "Overnight" | 2025 | Tougen Anki, opening theme |

=== Music videos ===
| Year | Title | Director(s) |
|---|---|---|
| 2013 | "Mr. Phantom" (Mr. ファントム) | Takuya Katsumi |
| 2014 | "Kishikaisei Story" (起死回生Story) | Kawakoshi Kazunori |
| 2014 | "Starget" | Fukatsu Masakazu |
| 2014 | "Kirai" (嫌い) | Toshitsugu Ōno |
| 2015 | "Amy" (エイミー) | Toshitsugu Ōno |
| 2015 | "Kantannakoto" (カンタンナコト) | Toshitsugu Ōno |
| 2015 | "Kyōran Hey Kids!!" (狂乱 Hey Kids!!) | Takurō Ōkubo |
| 2015 | "Kizukeyo Baby" (気づけよBaby) | Yoshihiro Okutō |
| 2016 | "A-E-U-I" | Toshiki Kaneda |
| 2016 | "Dip-Bap" | Yoshihiro Okutō |
| 2016 | "Catch Me" | Takurō Ōkubo |
| 2016 | "5150" | Kei Ikeda |
| 2016 | "Licorice" (リコリス) | Taiga Shin |
| 2017 | "Shala La" | Kei Ikeda |
| 2017 | "One's Again" | Kei Ikeda |
| 2017 | "Tonariau" (トナリアウ) | Yasuhiro Arafune |
| 2017 | "Black Memory" | Taiga Shin |
| 2018 | "Yōshi Tanrei na Uso" (容姿端麗な嘘) | Yoshihiro Okutō |
| 2018 | "Psychopath" | Take Ru |
| 2018 | "Wagamama de Gomakasanaide" (ワガママで誤魔化さないで) | Satoshi Watanabe |
| 2019 | "Color Tokyo" | Kanzaki Mineto |
| 2019 | "Don't You Think" feat. Lozareena | Mineto Kanzaki |
| 2019 | "Shine Holder" | Buddha Inc. |
| 2020 | "Tonight the Silence Kills Me with Your Fire" | Tomoo Noda |
| 2020 | "Dream In Drive" | —N/a |
| 2020 | "Naked" | Shin Okawa |
| 2020 | "Slowly But Surely I Go On" | Tomoo Noda |
| 2021 | "Red Criminal" | Tomoo Noda |
| 2021 | "Machinegun" | Takuya Oyama |
| 2022 | "Enemy" feat. Kamui | Takuya Oyama |
| 2022 | "Bug" | Takuya Oyama |
| 2023 | "Enchant" | Takuya Oyama |
| 2023 | "Yellow" | Takuya Setomitsu |

== Awards and nominations ==
| Year | Award | Category | Work/Nominee | Result |
|---|---|---|---|---|
| 2014 | CD Shop Awards | Regional Production (Kansai region) | Orange no Nukegara, Watashi ga Ikita Ai no Akashi | Won |
| 2017 | Space Shower Music Awards | Best Rock Artist | The Oral Cigarettes | Nominated |
| 2018 | Space Shower Music Awards | Best Rock Artist | The Oral Cigarettes | Nominated |
| 2019 | Space Shower Music Awards | Best Rock Artist | The Oral Cigarettes | Nominated |
| 2021 | Space Shower Music Awards | Best Rock Artist | The Oral Cigarettes | Nominated |
| 2021 | Space Shower Music Awards | Best Conceptual Live | The Oral Cigarettes | Won |
