= Concept virus =

Concept virus refers to two different pieces of computer malware, each of which has acted as a proof of concept for a new method of propagation:

- WM/Concept (1995), the first widely known macro virus to spread through Microsoft Word (though not the first macro virus per se)
- Nimda (2001), named Concept Virus by its author, one of the first multi-vector Windows viruses.
