= Conception (video game) =

- Developer: Chime
- Publisher: Spike Chunsoft
- Producer: Yoshinori Terasawa
- Artist: Shinichirou Otsuka
- Series: Conception
- Platforms: PlayStation Portable, PlayStation 4, Microsoft Windows
- Release: PSP: JP: April 26, 2012 PS4; JP: January 31, 2019; NA: November 5, 2019; EU: November 8, 2019 Windows; WW: November 5, 2019
- Genres: Role-playing, Dating sim
- Mode: Single-player

Conception (Japanese: CONCEPTION 俺の子供を産んでくれ!, Hepburn: Konsepushon: Ore no Kodomo o Undekure!; lit. Conception: Please Give Birth to My Child!) is a role-playing video game produced by Spike. The game was released exclusively for the PlayStation Portable in Japan on April 26, 2012. A remaster of the game titled Conception Plus: Maidens of the Twelve Stars (Note: Conception Plus: Ore no Kodomo o Undekure! (CONCEPTION PLUS 俺の子供を産んでくれ！; Conception Plus: Please Give Birth to My Child!)) was released on January 31, 2019 in Japan for the PlayStation 4, and was released worldwide on November 5, 2019 for the PlayStation 4 and Steam.

A second game in the series, Conception II: Children of the Seven Stars, was released for the PlayStation Vita and Nintendo 3DS across 2013 and 2014 in Japanese and English, and later released on Steam in 2016.

== Gameplay ==
The player's goal is to charm girls from National Star God Academy, raise their affection for Itsuki, then produce and take the Star Children to explore dungeons and battle Impurities. However, it is not an eroge, as the "Star Children" are produced by pouring energy from Itsuki and one of the twelve Star Maidens into a particular device.

The child's class and statistics are determined by which character parents the child; for example, certain combinations could result in creating a warrior, or a child who specializes in magic. To produce more plentiful and powerful Star Children, Itsuki must increase his intimacy with the twelve maidens. The other aspects of the gameplay are typical to dating simulation games.

The game operates on a turn-based battle system.

== Plot ==
=== Story ===
On his high school graduation day, Itsuki's cousin, Mahiru, tells him that she's pregnant. Just then, a gate of light emerges and transports the two into the world of Granvania. In this land, "Impurities" have been causing a disturbance to the Stars, ultimately plunging Granvania into chaos and disorder. And Itsuki, now revealed to be the "God's Gift" who is fated to meet with the Star Maidens, is seen as Granvania's last hope and was thus given the task to produce "Star Children" and combat the "impurities". And unless the task is complete, Itsuki may never be able to return home.

=== Characters ===
Itsuki Yuge (弓削イツキ, Yuge Itsuki)
Voiced by (English): Erik Scott Kimerer (game); Ricco Fajardo (anime)
Voiced by (Japanese): Yūki Ono (game, anime)
An unmotivated male high school student from Granvania National Star God Academy, and is the main protagonist of the game. He's prone to making cold statements, but has a strong sense of justice. He was summoned to Granvania as the God's Gift who makes Star Children with the 12 Star Maidens in order to save the World.

Mahiru Konatsuki (粉月マヒル, Konatsuki Mahiru)
Voiced by (English): Cherami Leigh (game); Megan Shipman (anime)
Voiced by (Japanese): Emiri Katō (game, anime)
Itsuki's cousin and childhood friend. Mahiru is the Maiden of Virgo, one of the twelve Star Maidens who Itsuki must meet.

Arie (アリー, Arī)
Voiced by (English): Lauren Landa (game); Natalie Hoover (anime)
Voiced by (Japanese): Aya Endō (game, anime)
Arie is the Maiden of Aries and a kindhearted nun. She has been studying and teach young children at church for quite sometimes. She's capable of casting a spell which causes dizziness.

Femiruna (フェミルナ, Femiruna)
Voiced by (English): Amber Lee Connors (game); Amanda Lee (anime) (English)
Voiced by (Japanese): Saki Fujita (game, anime)
Femiruna is the Maiden of Leo and the only daughter of a certain millionaire. As such, she has a large number of servants at her beck and call.

Collette (コレット, Koretto)
Voiced by (English): Christine Marie Cabanos (game); Rachel Thompson (anime)
Voiced by (Japanese): Asami Shimoda (game, anime)
Collette is the Maiden of Aquarius. She runs a bakery.

Yuzuha (ユズハ, Yuzuha)
Voiced by (English): Erika Harlacher (game); Amber Lee Connors (anime)
Voiced by (Japanese): Yukiyo Fujii (game, anime)
Yuzuha is the Maiden of Pisces. She works as an artist and has a shortened life-span due to illness.

Ruka (ルカ, Ruka)
Voiced by (English): Cristina Vee (game); Tia Ballard (anime)
Voiced by (Japanese): Makiko Ohmoto (game, anime)
Ruka is the Maiden of Cancer. She has a very perceptive insight which allows her to see into the hearts of the people around her as well as read their minds, though she is unable to do so with God's Gifts. She maintains a cold attitude toward others. She works in an orphanage.

Reone (レオーネ, Reōne)
Voiced by (English): Kira Buckland (game); Jamie Marchi (anime)
Voiced by (Japanese): Yuriko Yamaguchi (game, anime)
Reone is the Maiden of Scorpio and the academy's physician. She also takes care of other Maidens' health. In the English dub of the anime, she is instead named Leone.

Farun (ファルン, Farun)
Voiced by (English): Tia Ballard (game); Jad Saxton (anime)
Voiced by (Japanese): Kazusa Aranami (game, anime)
Farun is the Maiden of Capricorn. She works as both a dancer and a waitress in a tavern. In the English dub of the anime, she is instead named Falun.

Tarua (タルア, Tarua)
Voiced by (English): Rachelle Heger (game); Kristen McGuire (anime)
Voiced by (Japanese): Momoko Ohara (original game); Riho Sugiyama (anime, Plus)
Tarua is the Maiden of Taurus and a postman in-training. She always gives her best at everything, and strives to be a respectable in the future. She loves running all over the town and works as a mailman.

Lilith and Lille (弓リリス＆リリィ, Ririsu & Ririi)
Voiced by (English): Jeannie Tirado (game); Monica Rial (anime)
Voiced by (Japanese): Kana Asumi (game, anime)
Lilith and Lille are the Maidens of Gemini. They share one body, and their personalities switch if hit on the head. Lilith is more reserved, whilst Lillie is mischievous and likes to demand people to obey her commands unconditionally. They work as a fortune teller. In the English dub of the anime, Lille is instead named Lily.

Mirei (ミレイ, Mirei)
Voiced by (English): Elizabeth Maxwell (game); Brianna Roberts (anime)
Voiced by (Japanese): Sanae Kobayashi (game, anime)
Mirei is the Maiden of Libra. She is a very calm and logical person. Mirei has been studying magic for many years. Her interest lies mainly in her research. She views love as a foolish concept.

Sue (スゥ, Suu)
Voiced by (English): Jad Saxton (game); Sarah Wiedenheft (anime)
Voiced by (Japanese): Eri Kitamura (game, anime)
Sue is the Maiden of Sagittarius. She loves taking care of animals and often bring them to the academy, even without permission. Her dream is to one day becomes a veterinarian.

Mana (マナ, Mana)
Voiced by (English): Sarah Anne Williams (game); Felecia Angelle (anime)
Voiced by (Japanese): Yurin (game, anime)
Mana is the perverted red panda mascot of Granvania. She is an impurity who grew to love humans after bonding with Shangri-la 100 years ago. He sends her to look after the God's Gifts and help them save the World every ten years.

Shangri-la (シャングリラ, Shangurira)
Voiced by (English): Christopher Corey Smith (game); David Wald (anime)
Voiced by (Japanese): Kenichirou Matsuda (game, anime)
Shangri-la is the ruler of the Kingdom of Granvania. 100 years before the events of the game, he was summoned from the real world as a God's Gift (God's Gifts only age once every three years, rather than every year, allowing him to live longer than others) and saved it by making Star Children with previous Star Maidens, much like Isuki now has to do with the current Star Maidens. Instead of returning to his own World he remained in Granvania, became the King, and informs the God's Gifts who arrive every 10 years of their duty (as only the current God's Gift can make Star Children and fight the Impurities) with them reporting to him of their successes.

Narcisstes (ナルシステス, Narushisutesu)
Voiced by (English): Kyle Hebert (game); J. Michael Tatum (anime)
Voiced by (Japanese): Daisuke Hirakawa (game, anime)
Narcisstes is the scholar in service of the Kingdom of Granvania.

Alfie (アーフィー, Āfī)
Voiced by (English): Hunter MacKenzie Austin (game); Caitlin Glass (anime)
Voiced by (Japanese): Ai Kakuma (game, anime)
Alfie is in charge of training the Star Children. She is later revealed to be the 13th Maiden. 30 years before the events of the game, she was a Star Child from a previous God's Gift and her body was modified to turn her into a Star Maiden (in the hopes that a Star Child would be able to make more powerful Star Children). This removed her immortality (as Star Children are immortal) though allowed her to create Star Children in exchange which she didn't mind as she would be able to help save the World once again like she had 30 years ago despite her now being able to die, as only current Star Children could fight impurities and as such making new ones with the God's Gift would allow her to aid in saving the World once again.

Thirteenth Phantom (第13ファントム, Dai 13 fantomu)
Voiced by: Show Hayami
The Thirteenth Phantom is the source of all Impurities. Its true name is Chaos.

Star Children (星の子, Hoshi no Ko)
Voiced by: Various actors
Star Children are magical children created by Itsuki and the various Star Maidens through a ritual with them appearing from thin air already able to talk and fight, rather than through pregnancy. They are able to fight the Impurities alongside Itsuki. The more Ituski and the Star Maidens love each other when creating them, the more powerful they are. There are 19 different types of Star Children, each with varying stats, attacks etc.

== Reception ==
Reception

Aggregate score
Aggregator	Score
Metacritic	PS4: 62/100

Famitsu rated the game with a score of 35/40.

The response to Conception Plus: Maiden of the Twelve Stars is rather mixed. On Metacritic, the game has a score of 62.

== Legacy ==
A second game, titled Conception II: Children of the Seven Stars (コンセプションII 七星の導きとマズルの悪夢, Conception II: Nanahoshi no Michibiki to Mazuru no Akumu), was released on August 22, 2013 for the Nintendo 3DS and PlayStation Vita, and August 15, 2016 on Steam.

== Remaster ==
On September 17, 2018, Famitsu teased an article that would reveal a new Conception project. The next day on September 18, 2018, a remaster of the first Conception video game titled Conception Plus: Ore no Kodomo o Undekure! was announced to be shown at Tokyo Game Show 2018 for the PlayStation 4. It was developed by Spike Chunsoft and was released on January 31, 2019.

On July 4, 2019, it was announced that the game would receive an English release on November 5, 2019 for the PlayStation 4 and Steam, under the title Conception Plus: Maidens of the Twelve Stars.

The Touch Communication feature was removed from all versions of Conception Plus due to "various circumstances". The animation used during "Classmating rituals" in the western PlayStation 4 version was modified, but it was not modified in the western PC version.

== Anime ==
- Conception
- Conception anime key visual
- Genre: Isekai, fantasy, Romantic comedy, Harem
- Created by: Spike Chunsoft
- Anime television series
- Directed by: Keitaro Motonaga
- Produced by: Junichi Takagi; Kazuhiko Hidano; Tomoyuki Ōwada; Kazuo Ōnuki; Toshio Okada; Daiju Meguro (Note: This is a possible reading of the Japanese Kanji 目黒大樹, however the romanization is not confirmed.); Tetsu Koike (Note: This is a possible reading of the Japanese Kanji 小池哲, however the romanization is not confirmed.); Yukiko Ishibashi (#2–12)
- Written by: Yūko Kakihara
- Music by: Masato Kōda
- Studio: Gonzo
- Licensed by: Crunchyroll; SEA: Medialink
- Original network: SUN TV, BS11, Tokyo MX, AT-X
- Original run: October 10, 2018 – December 26, 2018
- Episodes: 12

On May 4, 2018, an anime television series produced by Gonzo was announced, and aired from October 10 to December 26, 2018 on SUN TV, BS11, and Tokyo MX. (Note: SUN TV listed the series premiere at 25:30 on October 9, 2018, which is at October 10 at 1:30 a.m.)

The series was directed by Keitaro Motonaga, with Yūko Kakihara writing the screenplay, Masato Kōda composing the music, and Yosuke Okuda adapting Shinichiro Otsuka's character designs for animation. The opening theme is "Star light, Star bright" by Nano, while the ending theme is "Desires" by Manami Numakura.

Crunchyroll simulcast the series, while Funimation had licensed the anime for an English dub. Following Sony's acquisition of Crunchyroll, the dub was moved to Crunchyroll.

=== Episode list ===
No.	English title (Note: All English titles are taken from Crunchyroll.) Original Japanese title	Original air date
1	"My Child?!"; Transliteration: "Ore no Kodomo!?" (Japanese: 俺の子ども！？)	October 10, 2018
2	"I Want You to Have My Child"; Transliteration: "Ore no Kodomo o, Unde Hoshii" (Japanese: 俺の子どもを、産んでほしい)	October 17, 2018
3	"Would You Try Having My Child?"; Transliteration: "Ore no Kodomo, Unde Minai?" (Japanese: 俺の子ども、産んでみない？)	October 24, 2018
4	"Please Have My Child!"; Transliteration: "Ore no Kodomo o, Unde Kudasai!" (Japanese: 俺の子どもを、産んでください！)	October 31, 2018
5	"I've Got So Many Kids"; Transliteration: "Ore mo Sukkari, Kodakusan" (Japanese: 俺もすっかり、子だくさん)	November 7, 2018
6	"Will You Have My Child BlehBleh!"; Transliteration: "Ore no Kodomo o, bu bo be bebe!" (Japanese: 俺の子どもを、ぶぼべべべ！)	November 14, 2018
7	"Please Be My Chikuwa!"; Transliteration: "Ore no Chiku wa ni, Natte Kure!" (Japanese: 俺のちくわに、なってくれ！)	November 21, 2018
8	"My Child, Welcome!"; Transliteration: "Ore no Kodomo o, Heirasshai!" (Japanese: 俺の子どもを、へいらっしゃい！)	November 28, 2018
9	"Let's Try Giving Birth, Together"; Transliteration: "Ore to Omae de, Unde Miyou! !" (Japanese: 俺とおまえで、産んでみよう!!)	December 5, 2018
10	"My Children, Thirteen of Them!?"; Transliteration: "Ore no Kodomo ga, 13-nin!?" (Japanese: 俺の子どもが、13人!?)	December 12, 2018
11	"Are You Going to Tell Me That You Want Me to Have Your Child"; Transliteration: "Masaka Atai ni Kodomo o Unde Kure to iu Tsumori Janakarou na" (Japanese: まさかあたいに子どもを産んでくれと言うつもりじゃなかろうな)	December 19, 2018
12	"Give Birth to My Child!"; Transliteration: "Ore no Kodomo o, Unde Kure!" (Japanese: 俺の子どもを、産んでくれ！)	December 26, 2018
