= Conception II: Children of the Seven Stars =

2013 video game

- Developer: Chime
- Publishers: JP: Spike Chunsoft (3DS/PSV); WW: Atlus (3DS/PSV); WW: Spike Chunsoft (Windows)
- Artist: Shinichirou Otsuka
- Series: Conception
- Platforms: Nintendo 3DS, PlayStation Vita, Microsoft Windows
- Release: 3DS, PS Vita: JP: August 22, 2013; NA: April 15, 2014; PAL: May 14, 2014 (Vita); PAL: May 15, 2014 (3DS); Windows: WW: August 16, 2016
- Genre: Role-playing game
- Mode: Single-player

Conception II: Children of the Seven Stars (Note: Known in Japan as Konsepushon Tsū: Nanahoshi no Michibiki to Mazuru no Akumu (CONCEPTIONII 七星の導きとマズルの悪夢; lit. Conception II: Guidance of Seven Stars and The Demon's Puzzle)) is a Japanese role-playing video game by Spike Chunsoft and Atlus for the Nintendo 3DS and PlayStation Vita platforms. It is a follow-up to Conception: Ore no Kodomo o Undekure! in terms of gameplay, but their stories are unrelated. Conception II was released in Japan on August 22, 2013, in North America on April 15, 2014, in the PAL region in May 2014 and worldwide on August 16, 2016, for Microsoft Windows.

== Gameplay ==
Conception II is a role-playing video game with turn-based battles, in which players control a student at a high school that doubles as a training facility for demon hunters. The protagonist possesses an extremely high amount of ether in his body, which allows him to conceive Star Children to fight demons by 'classmating' with his other classmates. During battle, fighters can be strategically placed around the enemies, allowing players to either safely target weak points or charge head on for bigger rewards.

== Synopsis ==
The game's story follows Wake Archus (default name), a young teenage boy growing up in a world where demonic monsters pose a constant threat to society. These monsters are formed in Dusk Circles, which have formed in several locations throughout the world. After a monster attack kills Wake's sister on the day of her wedding, Wake discovers that he has the mark of the Star God on his hand. He eagerly agrees to attend a school that trains people who bear this mark, all of whom are in their early to late teens, as the mark disappears shortly after they become adults. Wake is discovered to have a particularly high amount of ether in his body, which allows him to enter the labyrinths within the Dusk Circles and still use Star Energy, a feat not previously believed to have been possible. As a result, Wake is called "God's Gift" and made an instant celebrity within the school. It is also discovered that Wake has a 100% chance of creating Star Children with S-rank female students (the highest ranking within the school), which Wake and the heroine can use to fight monsters. These children are created via a process called "classmating", which involves Wake and the female student touching one another and then forming the Star Child via a special matryoshka doll. As the game progresses players have the ability to follow several story lines concerning the heroines such as a ghost haunting the school pool that Fuuko's sports team practices in or Serina's frustration with her lack of height and physical development.

As Wake fights his way through several Dusk Circles, fellow student and school leader Alec grows more and more jealous of Wake's ability as Alec feels like a failure due to his inability to fight in the labyrinths. The latter confronts Wake over him not training enough, to which Wake readily admits. Alec's frustration is compounded after he slays a monster within the school, only to find that the monster was wearing a school uniform. It is believed that somehow students are transforming into monsters, possibly after ingesting a narcotic called "Trigger" that is supposed to enable users to more efficiently use Star Energy. Despite being ostracized by some of his fellow students, neither Wake nor his friends fault Alec for his actions and he remains friendly rivals with Wake. Alec's personal feelings towards fighting grow more tense over time, only mollified by the revelation that Chief Ruby, leader of the school's science lab, has found a way to help enable him to fight within the labyrinths using crystals discovered in previous Dusk Circles.

=== Endings ===
The game has several endings depending on which heroine the player selects to take to the Star Conception Festival at the game's conclusion. If the player has met specific conditions including unlocking all of the heroines' endings, the player can unlock a harem ending. Players also have the option to not select any heroine, which will show a scene where he hangs out with Chlotz and Luce.

- Fuuko: In Fuuko's ending, she reflects on her interactions with Mary, a ghost trapped in the academy's pool, as well as on the game's events as a whole, as she would otherwise have been an average teen girl. Wake informs Fuuko that he has never seen her as ordinary and that he wants to spend the rest of his life with her. Years later they are shown to have married and given birth to a daughter.
- Feene: In Feene's ending, Wake accompanies her to the festival, where Feene tells him to take pictures of whatever he wants and cares the most about. Wake tells her that he wants to take pictures of Feene for the rest of his life, which surprises Feene. She accepts his proposal and the two travel back to her hometown, where they are married.
- Narika: In Narika's ending, she is taken visibly aback when Wake tells her that he has chosen her as his date, as she did not believe that she was ever a valid candidate. She eagerly accepts and changes into a dress that she designed and sewed herself. A few months after graduating Wake and Narika are serving on the World Peace Council, where she confidently addresses the audience over various matters.
- Torri: In Torri's ending, she and Wake attend the festival, where they fulfill Torri's wish to fly by combining their energies to pilot a plane. During their flight Wake promises to stay with Torri regardless of where she goes.
- Chloe: In Chloe's ending, she and Wake leave the festival early to go to Curaoke (a special form of karaoke that uses star energy), as she had chosen to give up her singing career. She changes into a student uniform, as she graduated too early to be able to wear the uniform for very long. Wake convinces Chloe to return to her singing career and she performs a love song she wrote for him.
- Ellie: In Ellie's ending, Wake comes across Ellie as she is preparing to return to Gracia (the church) without seeing Wake, as it would weaken her resolve to return. Wake informs her that he has signed up for a job at Gracia, which would enable him to stay by her side. This slightly horrifies her, as this would involve him having to eliminate Heretics, but Wake reassures her that this is what he wants. The two are then shown working side by side, where Ellie questions whether her work is ultimately right or wrong and decides that it is what is right for her.
- Serina: In Serina's ending, she accepts Wake's invitation quickly, but asks for his help in using transformation magic to assume a taller, more shapely form. He agrees, but finds that rather than transforming, Serina kisses him and tells him that she doesn't need magic to feel confident. Three months later, Serina is running the family cafe with Wake while her older sister runs an amusement park.
- Harem: In the Harem ending, Wake chooses to invite all of the heroines to the festival, as he knows that selecting only one of them would upset the others. The girls are shown talking to one another, where they each confess that they had asked Wake to accompany them. They then admit that they also knew that he was paying attention to all of them at the same time, but chose not to do anything because they didn't think that they could do anything about it as strong bonds were needed in order to create strong Star Children and that he was not doing so just because he was being calculative. Wake finds his teammates all dressed in fancy dresses, and is urged to pick one of them. The scene then shifts to show Wake accompanying all of the heroines as they visit each other's home towns as well as assist Ellie in eliminating Heretics.

== Characters ==
Wake (ウェイク, Weiku)
Wake Archus is a teenager that has traveled to the Academy with the intent to help fight against the monsters that are threatening the world. While his initial test scores placed him at A Rank, he is given a special perk like an S Rank due to his high concentration of Ether, allowing him to successfully create Star Children with S Rank girls at the academy. He is referred to as God's Gift due to this ability. He is placed in the 2nd year class. His character is driven to fight due to him having witnessed several monsters slaughter his sister a day before her wedding. Wake fights with Dual Blades called Twin Blades.

Fuuko (フウコ, Fūko)
Fuuko Amicus is a pink-haired teenager with a chipper personality. She joins the Academy at the same time as Wake and is tested as an S-Rank. She joins the swim team and in her personal story line Fuuko interacts with the ghost of a female student that died while trying to eradicate an underwater nest of monsters. Her character is able to be selected to go into the labyrinths and classmate with. Fuuko fights with dual pistols called Zero Zwei.

Ellie (エリィ, Eryi)
Ellie Troit is a 1st year female student that works for the Church. She knows Wake from their childhood, although he initially does not remember their meeting, during which point they were attacked by a monster. Her character is able to be selected to go into the labyrinths and classmate with.

Narika (ナリカ, Narika)
Narika Shina is a shy, quiet female student that serves as the class representative for the 2nd year students. Her personal story line surrounds Narika's fear and seeming inability to speak in public due to her having a low personal opinion of her self-worth. Her character is able to be selected to go into the labyrinths and classmate with. Narika fights with a crossbow/cannon hybrid weapon called Brogue Arch.

Chloe (クロエ, Kuroe)
Chloe Genus is an Academy instructor whose advanced intellect allowed her to graduate early despite still being a teenager. She is the older sister of Chlotz and one of Wake's instructors. In her story line she pursues a side career as a singer and DJ, but is upset by the troubles and disruptions this causes. Her character is able to be selected to go into the labyrinths and classmate with. Chloe fights with Coquelicot, four airborne guns that she controls with a small handheld pistol.

Serina (セリナ, Serina)
Serina Leaf is a 3rd year female student that has the appearance of a child, making her seem younger than most of the cast. Her story line she struggles with her own self-image, as she dislikes that she looks like a child and is frequently treated like one. During her quest line, she discovers a spell that allows her to temporarily transform into a physically mature version of herself, but only when Wake kisses her. She character is able to be selected to go into the labyrinths and classmate with. Serina fights with a leg mounted cannon that fires ammunition when she kicks called Exiv Cannon.

Torri (トーリ, Tōri)
Torri Feiiji is a 1st year student with monochromatic hair. She is shown to be quite strange and is somewhat oblivious to it due being raised in a lab for most of her life. Her personal story line reflects her struggles to fit in with the people around her. Her character is able to be selected to go into the labyrinths and classmate with. Torri fights with a handheld Gatling Gun called Beehive.

Feene (フィーネ, Fīne)
Feene Glass is a third year female student introduced early in the game as one of Wake's partners but is not seen nor playable until about midway through the story. She is an accomplished fighter and noted for her cool personality and good looks. She is grateful for the Wake after clearing the Gluttony Dusk Circle, which was threatening her hometown, sparking some interest in him to become a partner for classmating. Her story line follows her interest in photography. Feene fights with a Gunlance and Shield called Lotus Grin.

Chlotz (クロツグ, Kurotsugu)
Chlotz Genus is the classmate of Wake and is the younger brother of Chloe. In the game, he joins the Academy the same time as the Wake and Fuuko where he is a B Rank, but slowly moves up in rank throughout the game. He works in the Academy's laboratory and will participate in several of the experiments involving classmanting, where male students can create star children with the main character and Alec. He has a crush on a fellow female student named Luce, which is initially not reciprocated due to her love for Alec.

Alec (アレック, Arekku)
Alec Marker is a male student at the Academy and the son of the President of AngelMarker Industries. The initial story line shows him to be an outwardly cold character, which is shown to be false as the game progresses. He is very driven, which initially causes strife between him and the Wake. He later becomes a friendly rival to Wake.

== Development ==
Conception II was first announced in March 2013 as a sequel to the original Conception game in April 2012. While the original was for the PlayStation Portable, the sequel was announced for the Nintendo 3DS and PlayStation Vita platforms. The game's story was revealed to be roughly twice the size of the original. It was released on August 22, 2013, in Japan, with a playable demo for the game being released two months prior in early June.

Atlus announced an English localization of the game on November 19, 2013, to be released in early 2014. A week prior, the company had a mysterious ultrasound-based teaser website hinting at the game's reveal. The game's English title will be Conception II: Children of the Seven Stars. While the original Conception was not translated into English after its release on the PlayStation Portable in April 2012, the two games' stories are not connected, allowing Western audiences to enjoy the game as a stand-alone title. While the American and Japanese versions were released at retail (Japan on release date, and North America a few months later) and digitally (all regions on release date), the European release is digital only.

Various downloadable content (DLC), both free and paid, was released for the game, including boss battles against Monokuma from the Danganronpa series. Atlus announced they would release these DLC for North America and Europe between April and May 2014.

== Reception ==
Reception

Aggregate score
Aggregator	Score	
Aggregator	3DS	PS Vita
Metacritic	62/100	62/100

Review scores
Publication	Score	
Publication	3DS	PS Vita
Destructoid	N/A	7.5/10
Electronic Gaming Monthly	N/A	7.5/10
Famitsu	34/40	34/40
Game Informer	6/10	6/10
GameRevolution	N/A	2.5/5
GameSpot	N/A	5/10
GameZone	7/10	7/10
Joystiq	N/A	3/5
Nintendo Life	8/10	N/A
Nintendo World Report	6/10	N/A
Official Nintendo Magazine	54%	N/A
Polygon	N/A	4/10
411Mania	N/A	6.9/10

The 3DS and Vita versions of Conception II received "mixed" reviews according to the review aggregation website Metacritic. Many reviewers negatively compared the game to the Persona series, and Game Informer commented that while the issues in Persona felt important, the issues in Conception II felt "laughably superficial". The reviewer from EGMNow was mixed in their review, as they felt that there was a "Persona-esque addictive quality to the package" when it came to the dungeon crawling, but that they did not overly enjoy the game's dating sim aspects due to the shallowness of the interactions with the heroines. Joystiq criticized the game's more repetitive aspects and stated that upgrading the various Star Children made it necessary to repeat multiple dungeons to level them up, and that the game as a whole felt mediocre.

In contrast, Famitsu rated both the 3DS and Vita versions highly, and Nintendo Life remarked that "With fun characters, unique and engaging combat, a cute central conceit, and an irrepressibly cool soundtrack, Conception II is a bundle of JRPG joy."

=== Sales ===
In the first week of sales upon release, Conception II sold 20,000 copies on the PlayStation Vita, making it the fifth best selling game of the week, and an additional 5,000 copies on the Nintendo 3DS, putting it at sixteenth place for the week. This result was expected by Spike Chunsoft, which had shipped double the number of copies for the Vita version. The game's collective 25,000 copies sold in the first week fell just short of the original game's 30,000 sold in the first week.
