= Concept (disambiguation) =

A concept is an idea, something that is conceived in the human mind.

Concept may also refer to:

== Computing ==
- Concept (generic programming)
- In computational learning theory, a subset of the instance space; see Concept class
- Concepts (C++), an extension to C++'s template system
- Concept virus (disambiguation), the name of two pieces of malware
- Conceptualization (information science), organizing principles and objects underlying an abstract, simplified view of the world selected for a particular purpose such as information access

== Music and arts ==
- Concept (band), an Italian progressive power metal band
- Concept (The Sylvers album), 1981
- Concept (Sam Rivers album), 1997
- Concepts (album), a Frank Sinatra album
- The Concept (1978 album) funk album by Slave
- "The Concept", a song by Teenage Fanclub from the album Bandwagonesque
- DJ Concept, DJ, producer from Long Island, New York
- Concept (board game), a 2014 board game

== Technology ==
- Concept car, a prototype design
- Concept map, a method for visualizing concepts
- Concept phase, in product life-cycle management

== Other uses ==
- Berkshire Concept 70, an American sailplane design
- Concept 40, an American sailboat design
- Concept (journal), an interdisciplinary journal of graduate studies

== See also ==
- Concept S (disambiguation)
