= Code Vein =

2019 video game

- Developers: Bandai Namco Studios; Shift
- Publisher: Bandai Namco Entertainment
- Director: Hiroshi Yoshimura
- Producers: Keita Iizuka; Takeshi Miyazoe
- Designers: Yuta Yamamoto; Kasumi Nakayama
- Programmers: Akihiro Kayama; Masato Ito
- Artists: Kurumi Kobayashi; Koichi Itakura
- Writers: Hiroshi Yoshimura; Masato Kurata; Yuta Yamamoto
- Composer: Go Shiina
- Engine: Unreal Engine 4
- Platforms: PlayStation 4; Windows; Xbox One
- Release: September 27, 2019
- Genre: Action role-playing
- Modes: Single-player, multiplayer

Code Vein (Note: Japanese: コードヴェイン, Hepburn: Kōdo Vein) is an action role-playing game developed by Bandai Namco Studios and Shift, and published by Bandai Namco Entertainment. It was released worldwide on September 27, 2019, for PlayStation 4, Windows, and Xbox One, and sold over three million copies but received mixed reviews from critics. A sequel, Code Vein II, released in 2026.

== Gameplay ==
Code Vein is an open world action role-playing game set in a post-apocalyptic environment and played from a third-person perspective. Its gameplay was inspired by the Dark Souls series of games (published by Bandai Namco), while its animation takes after God Eater 3, with developers of the latter working on Code Vein.

== Plot ==
=== Setting ===
Code Vein is set in a post-apocalyptic near future following a calamity called the "Great Collapse," where gigantic monsters called Horrors emerged from underground and ravaged the world. To combat the Horrors, humanity created the Revenants: undead humans with vampiric abilities and strength who can only die permanently by destroying their hearts, and require human blood lest they frenzy and mutate into the Lost - savage and uncontrollable cannibals devoid of reason.

Participating in an experiment to stabilize the Revenant population and stave off both the Lost and the Horrors, a woman named Cruz Silva volunteers to become the "Queen of the Revenants", though she later frenzies herself under the strain of the experiments, going on a murderous rampage. More Revenants are created to defeat the Queen in a mission dubbed Operation Queenslayer, led by Cruz's father Gregorio Silva.

Though the Revenant army succeeds in killing Cruz, the Lost remain, and an impenetrable red mist that would come to be known as the Gaol of the Mists imprisons everyone in the ruined city. To make matters worse, the Bloodsprings (plants producing Blood Beads as an alternative to human blood) begin to dry up. Silva establishes a provisional government shortly after Operation Queenslayer, and the levy on Blood Beads that this government establishes worsens the shortage, leading many Revenants to turn into the Lost.

=== Story ===
The protagonist awakens within the ruined city of Gaol of the Mists, where they (Note: The protagonist can be male or female depending on the player's choice. This article uses singular they to refer to the protagonist.) meet Io, a mysterious woman compelled to help them, and Louis Amamiya, a fellow Revenant and a researcher seeking to secure a steady a supply of Blood Beads for the Gaol’s inhabitants. They make contact with the vestige of a Lost without becoming frenzied, acquiring its memories and Blood Code, an individual trait that grants each Revenant unique powers. Louis learns that the protagonist can use the Blood Code of whoever shares their blood. On their search for the source of Blood Beads, the group is joined by Yakumo Shinonome, Louis’s friend and a former soldier, and later a wandering Revenant named Mia Karnstein. Mia joins after her near-frenzy brother Nicola is seemingly killed by a mysterious hunter, resolving to aid the group and search for answers about her brother’s true fate. The protagonist later regains some of their memories, revealing their role in Operation Queenslayer alongside Silva and the hunter Jack Rutherford. The protagonist permanently killed the Queen, but was exposed to her blood and brought to near-frenzy, forcing Jack to try and fail to euthanize them.

The group encounters a massive Lost, the Successor to the Ribcage, which the protagonist absorbs. They learn that the experiment that made Cruz into the Queen rendered her immortal. Silva decided to divide Cruz's body into pieces called 'Relics', each placed in a voluntary Revenant, becoming Successors who sealed themselves in crypts while resisting the Relics' corruption. The group finds Louis' sister Karen, a Successor. The protagonist learns that they became a Successor by defeating Cruz, and plans to soothe other Successors to prevent the Queen's resurrection. Jack is revealed to be a Successor and caretaker of the other Successors alongside his companion Eva Roux.

The group travels to the mountains and faces the real Nicola, revealing that the one who accompanied Mia was a clone that Jack killed as its existence hastened Nicola's frenzy. The group reaches and soothe Nicola as he was fighting the Relic's influence, reuniting with Mia. Jack is assaulted on the way up the mountain by Juzo Mido, a scientist who believes Revenants are the next step in evolution and is seeking Silva, now a Successor. Jack reveals that the Gaol of the Mists was created by Silva to contain the Revenants for the sake of humanity and needed constant blood to maintain, which led to the Blood Bead levy system. Jack joins the group to secure more Relics, including Eva, a new Successor who joins the group if the protagonist restores her.

They confront Mido, who reveals his plan of undoing the Gaol as he kills his men so the Relics in his possession merge into Silva, causing him to mutate into the frenzied Skull King with the Gaol briefly dropping enough to reveal the outside world had still been infested with the monstrous Horrors. Upset at Silva resisting the Relic, Mido explains though the Gaol started off as a prison for Revenants, it has become a shield from the Horrors outside as he desires for Revenants to fight them and evolve. The group defeats him before he can reach Silva, but the damage is done and the group's only option is the protagonist resolving to replace Silva as the Successor. The group make their way to Silva's crypt and learn Io is a clone of Cruz, one of many sisters acting on Cruz's desire to prevent her resurrection by attending to the Successors. The group battle the Skull King, who loses control of his Relic as it calls the other Relics who transform him into the newest Queen, the Virgin Reborn, before being defeated.

The ending depends on how many Successors are saved and on the collection of the unique “Eos Vestiges.”

- If none are saved, the protagonist begins to frenzy while attempting to absorb the Relics, and quickly becomes possessed by the Queen herself. However, they are stabbed in the heart by a devastated Louis before they can attack their own companions. Afterwards, the companions become the new Successors, and Io rests under the first Bloodspring the protagonist saved before fading into ash.
- If the protagonist saves just one or some Successors, they absorb Silva's Relic and take his place in maintaining the Gaol, falling into what is expected to be an eternal slumber. The inhabitants of the Gaol still face crisis and instability with the Blood Bead shortage and the Lost. Io remains at the protagonist’s side.
- By saving every Successor and restoring Io's memories by collecting all Eos Vestiges, Io intervenes and takes the protagonist's place, absorbing all Relics. With the Successors restored to their human forms, Io transforms into a massive Bloodspring, the Weeping Tree, ensuring a steady supply of Blood Beads while maintaining the Gaol, giving the city a brighter and more certain future. Shortly after its creation, the Weeping Tree produces an amber Blood Bead carrying Io's memories and strength. The protagonist and the group use the amber Blood Bead to leave the Gaol, intent on helping other survivors of the Great Collapse. Though uncertain of whether or not the humans would welcome Revenants, the group recalls the purpose of their creation and venture into the outside world.

== Development ==
Planning for Code Vein started around 2014, with about 200 developers involved at one point. The game was announced in April 2017 and was originally set to be released in September 2018, until it was delayed to September 27, 2019. The game's opening sequence was created by animation studio Ufotable. In January 2020, the game's first downloadable content pack, Hellfire Knight, was released. The second, Frozen Empress, was released a month later. The last DLC titled Lord of Thunder was released on March 25, 2020.

== Reception ==
Reception

Aggregate score
Aggregator	Score
Metacritic	PC: 72/100; PS4: 70/100; XONE: 75/100

Review scores
Publication	Score
Destructoid	7.5/10
Electronic Gaming Monthly	4/5
Famitsu	32/40
Game Informer	6.5/10
GameRevolution	4.5/5
GameSpot	6/10
GamesRadar+	3/5
Hardcore Gamer	3.5/5
IGN	7/10
VG247	3/5
VideoGamer.com	5/10

Code Vein received "mixed or average reviews" for Windows and PlayStation 4, and "generally favorable reviews" for Xbox One according to review aggregator Metacritic. Japanese gaming magazine Famitsu gave the game a score of 32/40.

Game Informer Daniel Tack said that it has "some nice ideas that shake up the core formula, but they are all incidental details", with the game being "overburdened by stale scenery, boring bosses, and tiresome trudging". Hardcore Gamer called the game "surprisingly delightful," but said that the "story, combat, difficulty, visuals and world all suffer from a variety of issues." IGN stated, "Some changes like being able to easily switch around and experiment with classes on the fly are great, while others like its inconsistent AI partner could be more trouble than they were worth at times. But in both the good and the bad, I appreciated its enthusiasm for mixing things up and getting a little weird.", recommending it to those who are "looking for a unique take on a familiar type of challenge, and are open to loving and hating a game for its many mechanical quirks in the same breath."

Reception to the game's story was mixed. Electronic Gaming Monthly found the "utter ridiculousness" of the game's story fun, though considered it "hard at times to appreciate the deeper story that’s woven throughout." GamesRadar+ was interested in the game's themes and considered its characters "endearing" but the Vestige segments required to learn their backstories to be "cumbersome." VideoGamer.com considered the game to be lacking in narrative cohesion, and the presentation of the dialogue and cutscenes to be subpar. Anime Feminist writer Tessie Alina Corwin criticized the game's treatment of its female characters, saying that all of the game's important female characters either are or become passive in the story compared to the male characters.

=== Sales ===
The PlayStation 4 version of Code Vein debuted at number two on the all format video games sales chart in Japan, selling 60,843 copies within its first week on sale. The game sold over a million copies by February 2020, with that figure increasing to over two million by September 2021. As of March 2023, Code Vein has sold more than 3 million copies worldwide.
