= Code Vein II =

2026 video game

- Developer: Bandai Namco Studios
- Publisher: Bandai Namco Entertainment
- Director: Hiroshi Yoshimura
- Producer: Keita Iizuka
- Composer: Go Shiina
- Engine: Unreal Engine 5
- Platforms: PlayStation 5; Windows; Xbox Series X/S
- Release: January 29, 2026
- Genre: Action role-playing
- Mode: Single-player

Code Vein II is a 2026 action role-playing video game developed by Bandai Namco Studios and published by Bandai Namco Entertainment. A sequel to Code Vein (2019), the game was released for PlayStation 5, Windows, and Xbox Series X/S on January 29, 2026. It received mixed reviews from critics.

== Gameplay ==
Code Vein II is a Soulslike action role-playing video game played from a third-person perspective. In the game, the player assumes control of the Revenant Hunter, who must fight against Horrors, beings corrupted by a mysterious entity known as the Luna Rapacis. The Revenant Hunter is accompanied by a girl named Lou, who possesses the power to manipulate time, allowing players to travel to the past and alter events to influence the present and future. Throughout the game, players are also assisted by AI-controlled companion characters who can assist them in combat. Alternatively, these characters can be assimilated, removing them from the battlefield while granting the player additional bonuses and abilities. According to the team, Code Vein II's world design was more open when compared with the first game, with the players able to traverse the world using a motorcycle.

== Plot ==
=== Setting ===
Code Vein II is set in a post-apocalyptic world where both human and Revenant civilizations were nearly rendered extinct by a phenomenon called the Resurgence, which unleashed waves of energy that mutated all living beings, including human and Revenant alike, into mutated monsters dubbed Horrors. Both humans and Revenants banded together to fight off the Horrors, while the Revenants' leader Idris sacrificed himself to seal the Resurgence away. For the next hundred years, humans and Revenants continued to live in relative peace until Idris' seal failed and the Resurgence returned in an event called the Upheaval, which once again nearly rendered humans and Revenants extinct until five Revenant heroes sacrificed themselves to create a new seal called the Luna Rapacis. While it was successful at sealing the Resurgence, the Luna Rapacis also had the unfortunate effect of weakening Revenants exposed to its light and eventually turning them mad.

For the next hundred years after the Upheaval, humans and Revenants lived in an increasingly uneasy peace as Revenants began to prey on humans to sate their thirst for blood. In response, humanity formed the Revenant Hunters, an elite military force to defend themselves from rogue Revenants. However, just like Idris' seal, the Luna Rapacis begins to fail, necessitating a new ritual to seal the Resurgence.

=== Story ===
The Protagonist wakes up in the company of Revenant Lou MagMell with no memory of how they got there. Lou explains that the Protagonist was a Revenant Hunter who was killed evacuating humans as the Luna Rapacis began to crumble. In order to save the Protagonist's life, Lou donated half of her heart to them, turning them into a human/Revenant hybrid. They are then met by the leader of the Revenants, Lavinia Voda, who further explains that the five heroes powering the Luna Rapacis are beginning to succumb to the Resurgence, and must be killed so that the seal can be renewed. In order to achieve this, they must use Lou's ability to travel back in time to collect the Pathos of the heroes prior to their sacrifice so they can undo the seals protecting their bodies in the present. However, Lavinia warns them not to attempt to change the past, as the consequences are unpredictable.

Together, the Protagonist and Lou travel back in time and meet the first three heroes: Josée Anjou, Lyle McLeish, and Holly Asturias. While all three were heroic figures, they all suffered a great tragedy which convinced them to volunteer to seal the Resurgence out of a sense of guilt and atonement. Josée witnessed the death of her twin sister and later went on a rampage that killed her entire clan, Lyle failed to protect his friends from being wiped out by Revenant Hunters, and Holly was forced to kill her own father after accidentally mutating him into a horror with a flawed treatment. For all three heroes, their tragedies were caused by the leader of the Revenant Hunters, Alessandro Gobbo, who harbors a deep hatred for Revenants. The Protagonist gathers their Pathos and returns to the present, slaying the mindless, mutated versions of the three heroes. However, they have the option of going back in time and averting the tragedies that befell the three heroes as well as kill Alessandro, changing the present for the better. Though the heroes must be fought and killed again, they have managed to keep their sanity and gladly die by the Protagonist's hand.

Lavinia next tasks the Protagonist with slaying the fourth hero, the brilliant scientist Zenon Gryfgote. Meeting Zenon in the past, the Protagonist learns that both he and the Revenant Progenitors came to the same conclusion that Revenants and the Resurgence are inextricably linked, with the Resurgence growing in power the larger the Revenant population is. To this end, the Progenitors placed an artificial lifespan on all Revenants in an attempt to control the population, something Zenon vehemently disagrees with. Returning to the present, the Protagonist reluctantly kills Zenon and Lavinia directs them to the fifth and last hero, her own son Valentin. The Protagonist journeys into the Luna Rapacis itself to confront Valentin, and manages to view his memories, discovering that Valentin deduced Revenants were the cause of the Resurgence, and the only way to eliminate it for good is to destroy all Revenants. After Valentin is slain, Lavinia reveals that her true plan wasn't to renew the seal, as she came to agree with Valentin that Revenants should be wiped out so at least humanity can survive. She absorbs the Resurgence into her body and changes it to expel an energy wave that is lethal to only Revenants, killing all Revenants in the world including herself and Lou. Afterwards, humanity becomes the prime species of the world, and the Protagonist eventually dies of old age.

However, the Protagonist's death triggers a failsafe spell Zenon secretly implanted into their heart, which causes them to return to the point of time right before confronting Valentin, as well as opens a time rift leading to the events of the Upheaval itself. Seeing a chance to prevent the Upheaval, both the Protagonist and Lou travel through the rift. There, they find Lavinia attempting to force Zenon to become one of the seals in order to prevent him from carrying out his own plan to deal with the Resurgence. The Protagonist changes history by saving Zenon and trapping Lavinia instead, and they head for the Sealing Spire in order to carry out Zenon's plan. The Protagonist reunites with the other heroes and fight their way to the top of the Spire, where the past Lou attempts to absorb the Resurgence but fails. With Lavinia still trapped, Valentin takes the opportunity to devour the past Lou and absorb the Resurgence so he can use its power to destroy all Revenants. The protagonist manages to knock out Valentin, giving Lou the opportunity to try and seal the Resurgence herself. However, the Resurgence threatens to overwhelm her, so the Protagonist sacrifices themselves by returning their half of Lou's heart to her. Zenon realizes the key to sealing the Resurgence is using the power of both humanity and Revenants together. Lou manages to seal the Resurgence within herself, but both she and the Protagonist fall into a slumber and are sealed away.

If the Protagonist saved all of the heroes from their tragic fates, they are soon awoken by Lavinia's voice, who instructs them to destroy the Resurgence energy corrupting Lou. Upon doing so, both the Protagonist and Lou awaken to learn that Lavinia, Zenon, and the heroes had been working over the past century to find a way to permanently neutralize the Resurgence, and found they can share the burden of sealing it across all Revenants, effectively ending its threat. They then welcome the Protagonist and Lou to a new age where humans and Revenants can peacefully coexist.

== Development ==
After the release of Code Vein in 2019, the team at Bandai Namco Studios evaluated player feedback and decided to retain the anime aesthetic while significantly expanding certain features, such as deeper customization options, refined companion characters, and improved boss battles in both difficulty and presentation. Producer Keita Iizuka described the sequel as being "completely different" to the original game, as it is set in a different world and features an original cast of characters.

== Release ==
Code Vein II was announced at Summer Game Fest in June 2025. The game was released for PlayStation 5, Windows, and Xbox Series X/S on January 29, 2026.

== Reception ==
Reception

Aggregate scores
| Aggregator | Score |
|---|---|
| Metacritic | (PC) 66/100 (PS5) 70/100 (XSXS) 74/100 |
| OpenCritic | 48% recommend (Note: Based on 104 reviews) |

Review scores
| Publication | Score |
|---|---|
| Game Informer | 5.5/10 |
| GameSpot | 6/10 |
| GamesRadar+ | 2.5/5 |
| IGN | 6/10 |
| PC Gamer (US) | 69/100 |
| Push Square | 6/10 |
| Shacknews | 9/10 |
| TechRadar | 4/5 |
| VideoGamer.com | 6/10 |

Code Vein II received "mixed or average" reviews, according to review aggregator website Metacritic. Review aggregator OpenCritic determined that 48% of critics recommended the game.
