= God Eater 2 =

2013 video game

- Japanese PlayStation Vita cover art
- Developer: Shift
- Publisher: Bandai Namco Entertainment
- Director: Hiroshi Yoshimura
- Producer: Yosuke Tomizawa
- Composer: Go Shiina
- Series: God Eater
- Platforms: God Eater 2 PlayStation Vita, PlayStation Portable; God Eater 2: Rage Burst; PlayStation Vita, PlayStation 4, Microsoft Windows
- Release: God Eater 2: JP: November 14, 2013; God Eater 2: Rage Burst: JP: February 19, 2015; TW: February 26, 2015; NA: August 30, 2016; EU: August 30, 2016
- Genre: Action role-playing
- Modes: Single-player, multiplayer

God Eater 2 (ゴッドイーター2, Goddo Ītā 2) is a video game developed by Shift and published by Bandai Namco Entertainment on November 14, 2013, in Japan for PlayStation Vita and PlayStation Portable. It is a sequel to God Eater. It features a new setting, as well as new protagonists, new monsters, and new weapons. An expansion titled God Eater 2: Rage Burst was released in Japan on the PlayStation Vita and PlayStation 4. It was released in Western territories in summer 2016 with North American and European divisions of Bandai Namco Entertainment publishing the game on PlayStation 4, PlayStation Vita, and Microsoft Windows.

== Gameplay ==
The sample screenshot of the game for the PS Vita version

In comparison to Gods Eater Burst, there are new features and additions such as the four new weapons, the Boost Hammer, Charge Spear, the Variant Scythe and the Shotgun. The Boost Hammer is a hammer fitted with a rocket booster. The Charge Spear is a large spear that can be "charged" to form a sharpened organic blade. The Variant Scythe is a large scythe that can extend for a long range. The Shotgun is a large cannon that sprays bullets, allowing increased damage the closer the player is to the opponent. Most of the existing weapons have additional features and skills, such as the Short Blade's "Rising Edge" upward slash that sends the character into mid-air and can continue to an aerial combo, and the Long Blade's "Zero Stance" skill that can cancel attack animations, thus allowing longer combos or cancel an attack to block or dodge attacks.

The Blood Arts, one of the new additions in the game, are "attack add-on" that augment normal attacks of all manner into stronger attacks, thus either unlocking new Blood Arts or converting existing ones into much stronger variants. Raising a Blood Art's proficiency requires completing missions. Finishing a mission with a higher rank gives more experience points to the currently equipped Blood Art and other Blood Arts of the same variant.

Players can interact with various characters, who may invite them to optional side missions. Completing these give players materials, items, or even additional Blood Arts.

Unlocked through Character Episodes, Link Support Devices allow players to gain status effects in battle, such as 10% additional attack power from two to five minutes into the mission. There's a limit of 100 points that can be used to equip them, with each Link Device consuming anywhere from 10 to 60 points.

== Plot ==
The game takes place 3 years after God Eater. A new pandemic caused by "Red Rain" has struck the Far East Branch. Members of Special Forces "Blood", an affiliate of Fenrir who reside in a mobile base, known as "Friar", are sent to investigate.

The unnamed protagonist and Nana Kazuki are the newest God Eaters who have been found compatible with the 'P-66 Bias-Factor' and selected to join Blood, founded by Dr. Rachel Cladius and led by captain Julius Visconti. The protagonist meets Romeo Leoni, Julius's friend who is also a Blood member; Dr. Leah Cladius, Rachel's older sister; Director Gregory de Gremslow, the base's Supreme Commander; and Yuno Ashihara, a talented singer. The Blood group is later joined by two more P-66 God Eaters: Ciel Alençon, a master tactician from the same orphanage as Julius, and Gilbert "Gil" McLane, who is nicknamed "Fragging Gil" since his mentor Kate Lawry was K.I.A. five years ago. The Blood members lend aid to Fenrir's Far East Branch and work together with 'Cradle', a mobile emergency response and deployment station created after the incident at Aegis island. Each Blood member awakens their "Blood Power" through personal trials.

After a mission, Gil reproves Romeo for his lackadaisical approach to combat. Romeo loses his temper, revealing he feels inadequate since his Blood Power has yet to awaken, and runs away. An old couple shelter him during a red rain storm. After the storm Aragami attack the village. Romeo calls his Blood group, defeats them, and apologizes for his recklessness. The incident awakens his Blood Power.

A red rain storm hits Anagura. Romeo finds out that the old couple was not in the quarantine zone and the radio from north gate is broken. He goes searching for them, with Julius backing him up. They run into a pack of Garm Aragami and are overwhelmed. With his last strength, Romeo activates his Blood Power to scare off the Aragami. Romeo is very happy that the old couple was saved by Julius before he dies in front of him.

After Romeo's funeral, Julius resigns to help Dr. Rachel's God Arc Soldier project, creating unmanned mechs. Julius promotes the protagonist to Captain of the Blood unit, with Ciel being promoted to Vice-Captain. With this promotion, the Blood group is transferred to the Far East Branch. The Blood find a Marduk Aragami and kill it with God Arc Soldier help. Seeing the effectiveness of the God Arc Soldiers, the group understand why Julius refuses to return to Blood.

Responding to a distress call, Blood finds a wounded Dr. Leah, who begs them for asylum at the Far East branch. After she receives treatment, Leah tells about her past with Rachel. When they were kids, Leah was angered by Rachel's icy personality and pushed her down a flight of stairs, leaving her in a coma. Their father, Jepththat Cladius, resorted to injecting her with P73 Bias Factor to save her life, but Rachel remained crippled. Ever since, Rachel has quietly exploited Leah's guilt over her injury. Decades later, Jepththat confronted his daughters about their unethical experiments, and they ended up killing him with a prototype God Arc Soldier. Rachel is now using patients infected by the red rain for her experiments.

Romeo's death was part of Rachel's plan to use a red rain infected Julius as the new Singularity to devour all life on the planet. Fenrir dispatches the Blood Unit and Yuno to save red rain patients and find out their plan: perform a coup d'état in Friar to gain control over it. Yuno is infected while evacuating patients, and they find she is to become a singularity alongside Julius. The Blood unit arrives in Friar and confronts Rachel; however, the Apocalypse is now awakened with Julius inside of it. Rachel allows herself to be absorbed by it while Sakaki orders them to retreat.

Sakaki reveals the plan to stop the Apocalypse; since Yuno is another singularity, they can summon another Devouring Apocalypse to counter Julius'. With the protagonist's Blood Power and everyone around Fenrir singing Yuno's song, they succeed. They enter Julius's consciousness to talk to him one last time. Julius then stops it from evolving which results in an explosion that forms a helix-shaped plant-like structure, and all the red rain patients are cured.

Three months later, the Blood unit meets the Cradle leader: Lindow Amamiya, who asks for their assistance hunting Kyuubi, an elegant and dangerous Aragami. They find Kyuubi defeat it. Sakaki introduces Defense Unit team, where all members are 1st-generation God Eaters who Kanon used to work for.

=== Rage Burst ===
Fenrir Intelligence Center, led by a director named Isaac Freedman with Livie Collete, pay a visit to Fenrir Far East branch to take control of Spiral Tree which they announce to the public as "Sacred Ground for Fenrir". During the ceremony, a mysterious entity possesses Spiral Tree and corrupts it into a dirty version of Spiral Tree.

Julius's singularity is completely gone from Fenrir radar and the Blood unit worries something happened to him. Sakaki, Lindow, and Kota reveal that they want to know about Julius's singularity whereabouts. They must use his God Arc to find it, having known this thanks to their experiences from the events three years ago. Although the chance of finding Julius' Singularity is slim since no one can hold his God Arc - because it is not compatible with their body - Livie volunteers to test it, finding out that she is compatible and raising their chances of finding him. Freedman reveals that Livie can carry someone else's God Arc thanks to the unique Bias Factor inside her, also causing her immense pain.

== Development and release ==
The game was first announced on September 15, 2011, during the annual gaming convention Tokyo Game Show. At that time, during a Famitsu interview, Yusuke Tomizawa, producer of God Eater, said "God Eater 2 was to pinpoint what users found fun about the game; we're taking it apart and reassembling it from scratch".

A video trailer on God Eater 2's Japanese website shows that the game gives the option for PlayStation Portable and PlayStation Vita owners to play on a cooperative, multi-player mode with each other between platforms. A playable demo for the PlayStation Vita was released on 25 July 2013 on the Japan-region PlayStation Network.

The version 1.20 update released on 21 January 2014 introduces a new story arc to the game. The new episode features Lindow Amamiya, a returning character. There is also the addition of "Enhance" missions with additional optional requirements that activate certain effects when fulfilled. The update also introduces new support skills, items, costumes and weapon crafts.

The 1.40 patch released on 26 May 2014 introduced an online multiplayer mode supporting infrastructure play; before that, only ad hoc wireless multiplayer was supported.

=== Downloadable content ===
An additional DLC episode pack titled God Eater 2: Another Episode: Return of the Defense Unit was released on 5 June 2014 and priced at 1,000 yen. The expansion added a new storyline featuring characters from the original God Eater game. It also introduced new original NPC characters, who could be used within the main game after finishing the DLC episode.

=== God Eater 2: Rage Burst ===
God Eater 2: Rage Burst (ゴッドイーター2 レイジバースト, Goddo Ītā 2 Reiji Bāsuto) is an enhanced version of the original game for the PlayStation Vita and PlayStation 4. A new chapter titled "Rage Burst" is added to the story, featuring content separated into six difficulty levels within the main quests. Rage Burst introduces a new game mechanism known as "Blood Rage", which involves filling a yellow gauge by attacking enemies, and then making a pledge to the God Arc once it activates, granting various buffs to the player. Temporary invincibility can be toggled during the pledge selection process, at the expense of draining the yellow gauge on the bottom left of the screen. The game also introduces new characters, enemies and weapon types. All God Eater 2 Special Episode DLC is included in Rage Burst.

The PlayStation 4 version supports 5.1 surround sound with positional sound effects, and NPC communication messages can be directed from the speaker located on the DualShock 4 controller.

In December 2015, Bandai Namco's US branch announced the western release of God Eater: Resurrection and God Eater 2: Rage Burst following a teaser website countdown.

== Reception ==
Reception

Aggregate score
Aggregator	Score
Metacritic	PC: 73/100; PS4: 69/100

Review scores
Publication	Score
Destructoid	PC: 8/10
Famitsu	VITA: 38/40; PSP: 35/40; PS4/VITA (Rage Burst): 36/40
GameSpot	PS4: 8/10

God Eater 2 received positive reactions from critics. Famitsu gave the Vita version of the game a review score of 38/40, whilst the PSP version attained a score of 35/40. God Eater 2 was awarded during the Japan Game Awards 2013 by the Computer Entertainment Supplier's Association during the Tokyo Game Show, as one of eleven titles within the Future Division winners.

The PlayStation Vita version of God Eater 2 topped the Media Create sales charts in Japan during its first week of release by replacing Battlefield 4, selling 266,326 physical retail copies, ahead of Call of Duty: Ghosts and Pro Evolution Soccer 2014 which both also debuted the same week. In addition, the PSP version sold 112,024 copies, placing it in fourth place. The same week, PlayStation Vita console sales jumped up to 46,350 units, doubling over the previous week, while the PlayStation Vita TV, which made its Japan debut the same day as God Eater 2, sold 42,172 units. Prior to release, God Eater 2 was heavily marketed alongside the PlayStation Vita TV game system.

Among the Famitsu 2013 Top 100, a listing of the top 100 Japanese retail software sales for the year of 2013 from data collected by Famitsu's parent company Enterbrain, the PlayStation Vita version of God Eater 2 ranked number 20, with 354,498 physical retail sales, whilst the PlayStation Portable version ranked at number 53, with 180,781 retail sales. As of 31 March 2014, the game shipped 700,000 copies within Japan on both the PSP and Vita platforms according to a Namco Bandai financial report for the fiscal year ending March 2014.

God Eater 2 placed fourth place amongst all digital copy games sold on the Japanese PlayStation Network overall in 2013, and the second most-sold digital Vita game behind Dragon's Crown.

God Eater 2: Rage Burst sold 234,180 physical copies on Vita and 37,824 on PS4 within its debut week, placing first and third place respectively for the weekly sales charts.

== Sequel ==
A sequel, God Eater 3 was released in late 2018 in Japan and early 2019 in worldwide for PlayStation 4 and PC and in middle 2019 for Nintendo Switch. Marvelous Inc, who is best known for creating video game series like Senran Kagura, Rune Factory and Story of Season, replaced Shift.
