= God Eater (video game) =

Action role-playing video game

Gods Eater Burst
- North American cover art
- Developer: Shift
- Publishers: WW: Namco Bandai Games (Note: Released under the Namco brand.); NA: D3 Publisher
- Director: Hiroshi Yoshimura
- Producer: Yosuke Tomizawa
- Composer: Go Shiina
- Series: God Eater
- Platforms: God Eater, Gods Eater Burst; PlayStation Portable; God Eater Resurrection; PlayStation 4 PlayStation Vita; Microsoft Windows
- Release: God Eater: JP: February 4, 2010; Gods Eater Burst: JP: October 28, 2010; NA: March 15, 2011; EU: March 18, 2011; God Eater Resurrection: JP: October 29, 2015; NA: June 28, 2016; EU: August 30, 2016
- Genre: Action role-playing
- Mode: Single-player

God Eater (ゴッドイーター, Goddo Ītā) is a 2010 action role-playing game for the PlayStation Portable, developed and published by Namco Bandai Games in Japan. Gods Eater Burst (ゴッドイーター バースト, Goddo Ītā Bāsuto) is an enhanced re-release that expanded the story and introduced new game mechanics. Burst was the version that was localized and published by D3 Publisher in regions outside Japan; it was released in Japan on October 28, 2010, in North America on March 15, 2011, and in Europe three days later. A sequel, God Eater 2, was released in Japan in November 2013. An anime television series based on the game, also called God Eater, was released by Ufotable in 2015.

A remaster of Gods Eater Burst for the PlayStation 4 and PlayStation Vita, titled God Eater Resurrection has been released on October 29, 2015, in Japan. It was released in Western territories in summer 2016 with North American and European divisions of Bandai Namco Entertainment publishing the game on PlayStation 4, PlayStation Vita, and Microsoft Windows.

== Gameplay ==
Gameplay of Gods Eater Burst.

God Eater is an action role-playing game in which players take control a young New-Type God Eater, special warriors dedicated to defeating monstrous enemies known as the Aragami (荒神, "violent god"). God Eater offers mission-based single-player mode, which consists of over 100 missions, and cooperative play of up to three teammates over local ad hoc wireless multiplayer or AI-controlled teammates. The North American version of the game also supported the PlayStation 3's ad hoc Party. The game features character creation, allowing customization of hair style, hair color, face, skin color, clothing, and voice.

The goal of each mission is to defeat specific Aragami in the designated area within the time limit. Additional rewards are gained depending on how efficiently the mission was completed. Players can dash, sprint, and jump by consuming stamina (ST) that auto-regenerates over time. Players' sole weapon is the God Arc (神機, Jinki), a unique weapon that can instantly switch to four different forms: Blade, Gun, Shield and Predator. Attacking Aragami in Gun form consumes Oracle Points (OP). Oracle Points can be regained by successfully attacking in Blade form; however, this also consumes stamina. Once an Aragami has been defeated, materials can be collected from its remains by switching to Predator form and devouring it. If a player loses all of their health points (HP), AI teammates can use "Link Aid" to revive team members by sacrificing some HP of their own. By devouring an Aragami that is still alive, God Eaters obtain an Aragami bullet that can be fired back and temporarily enter a state called "Burst Mode" in which their speed, strength and energy regeneration increase. In addition, New-Type God Eaters can send teammates into an artificial Burst Mode called "Link Burst" by sending Aragami bullets at their teammates. The Link Burst is capable of "stacking" up to three times by receiving multiple Aragami bullets in succession.

Players can upgrade, enhance and craft Blade, Gun, Shield, Upgrade Parts for their God arc using materials primarily found in missions. Gods Eater Burst introduces a new equipment part called the Control Unit which bestows different abilities to the user when in Burst Mode depending on the Unit equipped.

God Eater Resurrection adds new and basic GE2RB updated features. Predator Style replaces the previously occupied Control Unit equip slot. It introduces a variety of new devouring moves such as various aerial devours, combo devours, step devours. Additionally, quick and charged devour can be changed with various other devours unlocked throughout the game. These devours can be further enhanced by the addition of various buffs, which are ranked from 1 to 3 depending on how useful they are. Devours have ranks too, from 1 to 3. The bigger the rank, the longer it takes to devour, but the better the available buffs. An updated feature from GE2 allows players the optional use of an Operator in battle, who will notify the player of any newly emerging Aragami and give status updates on players and NPCs in-battle.

"Personal Abilities" given to the NPC characters (sometimes online players as well) can provide various extra rewards or modify mission rewards. Selecting an NPC character's Personal Ability can lead to a small post-mission cut scene giving more details about the characters. The updated game also adds four weapons: Charge Spear, Boost Hammer, Shotgun, and Variant Scythe. These weapons made their debut in Gods Eater 2 and Gods Eater 2 Rage Burst. In total God Eater Resurrection has 14 difficulty ranks: 1-6 are the original God Eater scenario, 7-10 are Gods Eater Burst and 11-14 are the new God Eater Resurrection story arc. Included with the game are also two "Predator packs", collections of high difficulty missions.

== Plot ==
=== Setting ===
The game is set in the year 2071, in a world where civilization has been devastated by mysterious monsters known as the Aragami. The organization Fenrir, which had existed prior to the Aragami Outbreak in the early 2050s, rose to prominence after discovering the existence of Oracle Cells, the building blocks of Aragami. Using weapons called God Arcs, made from the cells of Aragami, Fenrir's Anti-Aragami Punitive Force, known as God Eaters, battle to exterminate the Aragami threat. The story is primarily set in the former Greater Tokyo Area. God Eaters are classified as either old-type, which can only keep their God Arc in gun form or blade form, or new-type, which can switch between gun and blade form.

=== Story ===
==== Part 1 ====
The protagonist joins Fenrir Far East Branch alongside Kota. They are assigned to the first unit, which consists of Lindow (the leader), Sakuya, and Soma along with their instructor, Tsubaki. Dr. Paylor Sakaki teaches new recruits about Aragami, and an initiative to expand the arcology of the Far East Branch known as the Aegis Project. A God Eater from Russia named Alisa, a new-type like the protagonist, joins the first unit. During a mission, Alisa experiences a psychological episode and accidentally traps Lindow. The rest of the first unit escapes, leaving Lindow behind. Alisa is treated for her episodes and removed from combat duty. The protagonist visits Alisa when she is asleep and discovers he can see her memories by making physical contact. Her episodes are due to the childhood trauma of watching her parents eaten by an Aragami and hypnosis by her therapist. The protagonist retrains Alisa, and she returns to duty. Sakuya, grieving for Lindow, finds a secret message from him which is inaccessible without his armlet.

After Lindow is declared missing in action, the protagonist is promoted to leader of the first unit. The director of the Fenrir Far East Branch, Johannes, uses them in top secret missions looking for the entity known as the singularity. Sakaki, aware of the director's intentions, deceives him into searching for the singularity in Europe by telling him a mysterious Aragami appeared there. Sakaki uses this time to send the first unit on a mission leading to the discovery of a human-like Aragami named Shio. They keep Shio a secret and educate her. The first unit searches for Lindow's armlet, recovering it in the body of an Aragami. Lindow's message for Sakuya reveals he was secretly investigating the Aegis Project. Sakuya and Alisa's further investigation leads them to Aegis Island. Johannes catches the two and admits that the Aegis project's true goal is to awaken the Aragami "Nova", destroy all life on earth, and save the Fenrir staff and their families by sending them into outer space in arks. Alisa's therapist hypnotizes Alisa into fighting Sakuya, but she overcomes it and the two escape.

The two inform the first unit about the Aegis Project. Kota decides to support the project to protect his family. A power outage causes the branch to go over to the backup generators controlled by Johannes, allowing him to see Sakaki is holding Shio, who is the singularity. Alisa and Sakuya rejoin the first unit after discovering that the Aegis Project is close to completion. Kota, discovering Shio is missing, decides to help the others and shows them a secret route into Aegis Island. Johannes extracts Shio's core and uses it to activate Nova. He urges the team to go into an ark before it's too late. Shio awakens, fuses her consciousness with Nova, and takes Nova to the moon in order to save the planet.

==== Part 2 (Burst) ====
Three months later, the first unit encounters a new-type Aragami that damages the protagonist's God Arc. Far East Branch is infiltrated by Aragami. With his God Arc undergoing repairs, the protagonist resorts to using Lindow's God Arc. Normally it is impossible to wield someone else's God Arc, but to save the life of Licca, the engineer, the protagonist endures the excruciating pain. He/She experiences Resonance through the God Arc, revealing Lindow is still alive. Before falling unconscious, the protagonist is saved from an Aragami by a God Eater, Ren, who used to work with Lindow. The search for Lindow is reopened. Ren explains that when a God Eater loses their armlet they eventually turn into Aragami themselves and can only be killed by their own God Arc. During the search for Lindow, the protagonist reencounters the new-type Aragami and experiences Resonance, revealing that the new-type is actually Lindow. The protagonist and Ren face Lindow alone on Aegis Island. Defying Ren's appeal to mercy kill Lindow, the protagonist uses Resonance to enter Lindow's mind with Ren and free him from the Aragami. During the battle, Ren reveals he is actually a projection of Lindow's God Arc and sacrifices himself to defeat the Aragami. Lindow returns to human form. Lindow marries Sakuya and begins training new-type God Eaters.

==== Part 3 (Resurrection) ====
A new Aragami, remnant of Nova, Arius Nova appears, having devoured various other Aragami. The monster becomes highly resistant to God Arcs, having similar components to the Outer Wall of Fenrir's Far East Branch.

All three units search for Arius Nova, eventually leading to another encounter. The first unit team (the protagonist, Soma, Alisa, and Kota) are all defeated, but an Aragami resembling Shio stops it from killing them. Professor Sakaki and Licca come up with a theory that Arius Nova is increasing its power by consuming Aragami formed by other remnants of Nova, classified as "Dreadnought" class. The God Eaters attempt to stymie its growth and assemble a weapon capable of killing it by hunting Dreadnought class Aragami, while encountering various apparitions of Shio in the field. However, Arius Nova kills a Dreadnought Aragami and devours the core, as the baits set up by Sakuya and Lindow didn't distract it. Kota shoots Arius Nova, revealing that the new core introduced into its system makes it vulnerable for a small amount of time. The God Eaters assemble a mass of Dreadnought cores and fire it into Arius Nova, thus crashing its defenses while it metabolizes the cores. They defeat Arius Nova and say their goodbyes to Shio. Shio's apparition returns to the real Shio, who is still on the moon, watching over and protecting humanity from afar.

=== Characters ===
- The player (プレイヤー, Pureiyā) is a new recruit on Far East Branch who is assigned as a member of the first unit of God Eaters. The player is also the first New-Type God Eater to join the Far East Branch. In various God Eater media, the male player's default name is revealed to be Yuu Kannagi (神薙 ユウ, Kannagi Yū) while in the anime adaptation, he is named as Lenka Utsugi (空木 レンカ, Utsugi Renka).
- Rindo Amamiya (雨宮 リンドウ, Amamiya Rindō; romanized as Lindow Amamiya in the anime version) is the leader of the first unit and boasts the highest survival rate (90%). His God Arc is an Old-Type Long Blade.
- Soma Schicksal (ソーマ・シックザール, Sōma Shikkuzāru) is a member of the first unit who avoids interacting with others but have a high survival rate the same as Rindo too. He is also very strong and strangely can regenerate his wounds faster than any other human. His God Arc is an Old-Type Buster Blade.
- Sakuya Tachibana (橘 サクヤ, Tachibana Sakuya) is the sub-leader of the first unit. She is a top-rank shooter and her god arc is a sniper (old-type; long range).
- Kota Fujiki (藤木 コウタ, Fujiki Kōta) is a member of the first unit who joins the God Eaters at the same time as the player. His god arc is an assault (old type; long range).
- Alisa Ilynichna Omela (アリサ・イリーニチナ・アミエーラ, Arisa Irīnichina Amiēra) is the new-type recruit from the Russia branch who has a traumatic history with Aragami. Her god arc is Long Blade Assault (New type). Like the player, Alisa is also a New-Type.
- Tsubaki Amamiya (雨宮 ツバキ, Amamiya Tsubaki) is Rindo's sister, who also acts as a supervisor of the first, second, and third units.
- Johannes von Schicksal (ヨハネス・フォン・シックザール, Yohanesu fon Shikkuzāru) is the head of the Far Eastern branch of Fenrir, Anagura. With his soft demeanour, he excels in political negotiating between the various branches. He is also the Father of Soma.
- Hibari Takeda (竹田 ヒバリ, Takeda Hibari) is a Far East Branch operator, mainly in charge of taking orders for missions and processing rewards. Despite being on the list of Possible Matches for Gods Eaters, she has yet to find a bias factor with a high enough compatibility rate.
- Paylor Sakaki (ペイラー・榊, Peirā Sakaki) is a founding member of Fenrir and current Chief Supervisor of its Far East Branch's Aragami Technology Department. He is the one who discovered the Bias Factor.
- Aisha Gauche (アイーシャ・ゴーシュ, Aīsha Gōshu) is a founding member of Fenrir and Chief of Aragami Research Lab as well as the deceased wife of Johannes von Schicksal, and the mother of Soma Schicksal.
- Licca Kusunoki (楠 リッカ, Kusonoki Rikka) a female mechanic of the God Arc Maintenance Crew.
- Tatsumi O'Mori (大森 タツミ, Oomori Tatsumi) a member of the 2nd Unit and leader of the Defense Unit. When not in duty, he's frequently seen hitting on Hibari at her counter. His god arc is a Short Blade (old-type).

== Development ==
The game was directed by Yoshimura Hiroshi, produced by Yosuke Tomizawa. Character designs were provided by Koichi Itakura and Sokabe Shuji.

God Eater was initially announced in July 2009 by Namco Bandai Games. Shortly after the game's Japanese release a North American release was announced by a subsidiary of Namco Bandai Holdings, D3 Publisher, for a Q3 2010 release, but was delayed to sometime in 2011.

Namco Bandai teased a new God Eater project with an event known as God Eater Fes 2010 which was scheduled to take place in Akiba Square on July 11, 2010. However, five days prior to the event, Famitsu revealed God Eater Burst, an "evolved" version of the original God Eater. The game was confirmed to contain additional arms, a new story, characters, enemies along with rebalanced gameplay and improved graphics. God Eater Burst was released in Japan in October 28, alongside an expansion pack God Eater Burst: Append Edition adding all the new content of GEB to the original GE game. The North American title was changed to Gods Eater Burst making the word God plural. In addition to the main story arc featured in the original, Gods Eater Burst features an added storyline not featured in the original Japanese release.

A sequel to the game, God Eater 2, is set two years after the first game. It was released on November 14, 2013.

== Related media ==
=== Printed media ===
Several light novel series adaptations have been released. The first novel series was written by Yuurikin, illustrated by Sokabe Shuji, published by Enterbrain and serialized in Famitsu Bunko magazine. The chapters were compiled into a single volume and released on June 30, 2010, under the title God Eater: Kinki o yaburu mono (ゴッドイーター 禁忌を破る者, God Eater: Those Who Break the Taboo). The second is made up of two-volumes: God Eater: Alisa in Underworld (GOD EATER ～アリサ・イン・アンダーワールド～) and God Eater: Knockin 'On Heaven's Door (GOD EATER ～ノッキン・オン・ヘブンズドア～). They were written by Ryuzaki Tsukasa, illustrated by Sokabe Shuji, and published by Kadokawa Shoten. The novels were released on September 18 and December 18 respectively.

The game had also received several manga adaptations written by Namco Bandai. The first is titled God Eater: Kyūseishu no Kikan (GOD EATER -救世主の帰還-, God Eater -Return of the Messaiah-) was illustrated by Osan Eijii, published by Kodansha, and serialized in Rival Comics magazine. As of December 28, 2011, the series was completed and compiled into five volumes. The second is titled God Eater: the spiral fate and was illustrated by Saito Rokuro, published by Dengeki Comics and serialized in Side-B.N Magazine. As of November 27, 2010, the manga was completed and compiled into two volumes. A third manga titled God Eater: the summer wars was illustrated by Okiura, published by Kadokawa Shoten and serialized in Dragon Age Comics Magazine. The series was completed and compiled into a single volume on May 7, 2012.

=== Anime ===
A twelve-minute prequel original video animation was made by Ufotable and aired on September 28, 2009. An anime television series was also produced by Ufotable. The series is directed by Takayuki Hirao with character designs by Keita Shimizu. The anime began airing on July 12, 2015, after the first episode was delayed by a week due to production issues.

=== Soundtrack ===
The official God Eater Burst Drama and Original Soundtrack (GOD EATER BURST ドラマ&オリジナル・サウンドトラック) was released on a single disc on December 22, 2010. It was composed by Go Shiina and featured the game's opening and ending theme songs, "Over the Clouds" and "My Life", both of which are sung by Alan.

God Eater Burst Drama and Original Soundtrack
No.	Title	Length
1.	"Over the clouds -BURST mix-"	1:50
2.	"Plank of Carneades (Drama)" (カルネアデスの板 (ドラマ))	28:28
3.	"Defense Squad: All Assembled! (Drama)" (防衛班・全員集合! (ドラマ))	11:07
4.	"Erik der Vogelweide's Magnificent Recollection (Drama)" (エリック・デア=フォーゲルヴァイデの華麗なる追憶 (ドラマ))	6:55
5.	"Decision Time" (決断の刻)	2:38
6.	"Merciless Lord" (無慈悲な王)	1:47
7.	"In the Sun" (陽だまりの中で)	3:10
8.	"Endless Voracity" (終わりなき侵喰)	2:05
9.	"Dum Spiro"	3:56
10.	"my life -farewell arrange-"	6:22
11.	"Bonus Drama"	5:42
Total length:		01:14:04

=== Other ===
A trading card game was released as God Eater Burst Monster Collection Trading Card Game in September 2011. Two 50-card decks were released as God Eater Burst - God Eater and God Eater Burst - Aragami that included special dice, a reference sheet, and a play mat. A set of nine miniatures featuring the Aragami was released in Japan as Soul of Figuration God Eater. A cell phone game spin off titled, God Eater Mobile was developed by Mobage and released on December 16, 2010, in Japan for the i-mode, EZweb, and Yahoo! Keitai distribution service. Similar to the original PSP game, it features character customization, item purchasing and hunting Aragami.

== Reception ==
Reception

Aggregate score
Aggregator	Score
Metacritic	PSP (Burst): 71/100; PS4: 70/100

Review scores
Publication	Score
Edge	PSP (Burst): 6/10
Eurogamer	PSP (Burst): 7/10
Famitsu	PSP: 34/40; PS4/VITA: 34/40
GameSpot	PSP (Burst): 7.5/10
Hardcore Gamer	PS4: 3.5/5
IGN	PSP (Burst): 6.5/10

The game received mixed reviews, with a 71/100 on Metacritic. The game scored well in Japanese gaming magazine Famitsu, which gave a total score of 34 out of 40(9/9/8/8).

=== Sales ===
The original God Eater sold 295,000 copies in the first week of its Japanese release, and by March 2011 God Eater had sold over 610,000 copies in Japan. The re-release version, God Eater Burst, sold 263,150 copies within the first week of release in Japan. Both versions combined have sold over one million units in Japan.

The 2015 remake, God Eater Resurrection, sold a total of 167,857 copies across both PlayStation Vita and PlayStation 4 platforms within the first week of release in Japan; the majority of copies sold involved the Vita version, which took the top position within the Japanese software sales charts for that particular week.

== See also ==
- God Eater 2
