= Bandai Namco Studios =

Japanese video game developer

Bandai Namco Studios Inc.

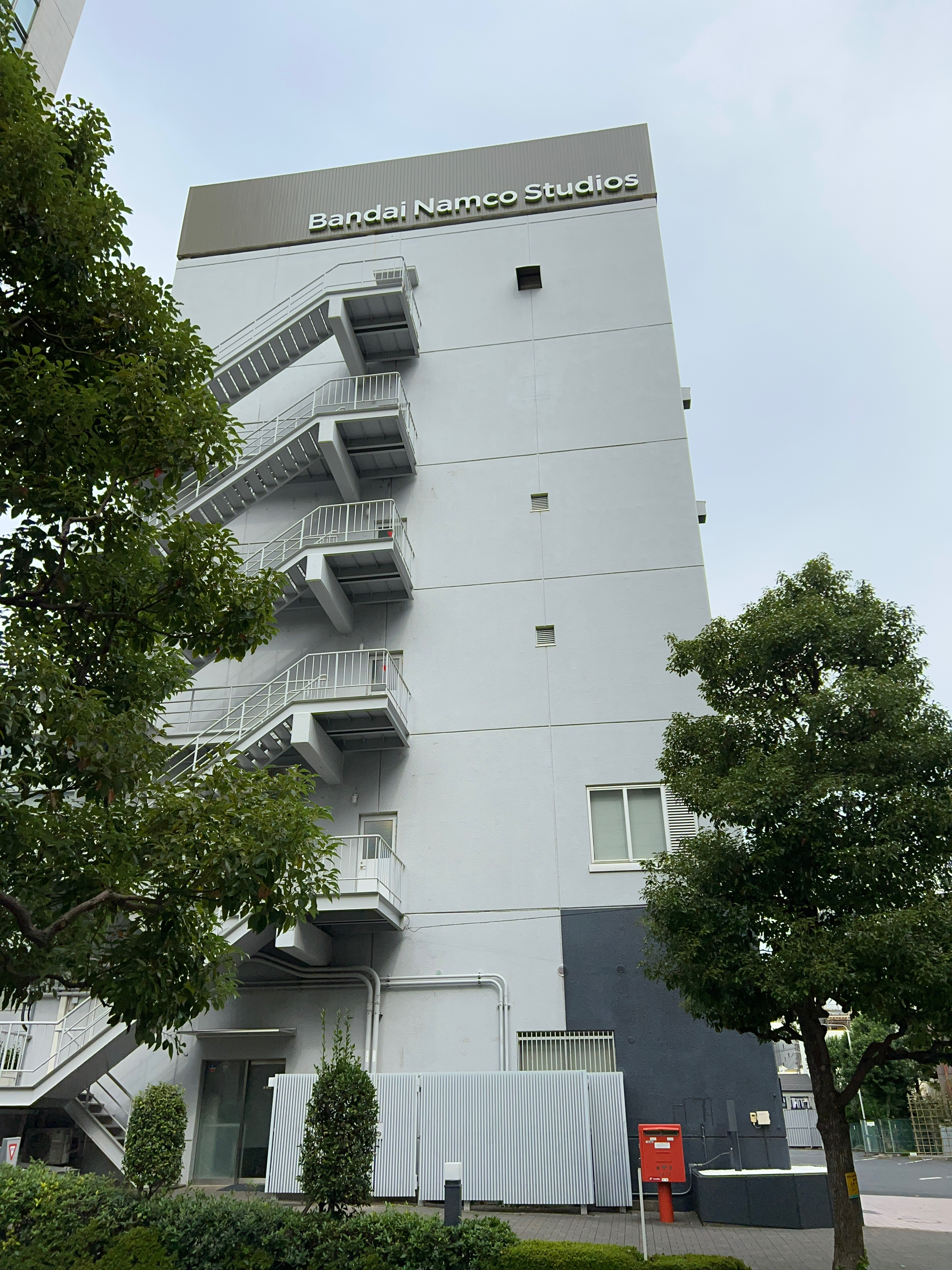
- Headquarters in Kōtō, Tokyo
- Native name: 株式会社バンダイナムコスタジオ
- Romanized name: Kabushiki gaisha Bandai Namuko Sutajio
- Formerly: Namco Bandai Studios Inc. (2012–2014)
- Type: Subsidiary
- Industry: Video games
- Founded: April 2, 2012; 14 years ago
- Headquarters: Eitai, Kōtō, Tokyo, Japan
- Key people: Daisuke Uchiyama; (president); Shigeru Yokoyama Hajime Nakatani; (chairman)
- Products: Ace Combat series; Galaxian series; God Eater series; The Idolmaster series; Pac-Man series; Soulcalibur series; Super Smash Bros. series; Taiko no Tatsujin series; Tales series; Tekken series; Time Crisis series
- Revenue: $6.8 billion (2020)
- Number of employees: 1,148 (2026<)
- Parent: Bandai Namco Entertainment
- Subsidiaries: Bandai Namco Forge Digitals; Bandai Namco Studios Malaysia; Bandai Namco Research
- Website: bandainamcostudios.com

Bandai Namco Studios Inc. (Note: Japanese: 株式会社バンダイナムコスタジオ, Hepburn: Kabushiki-gaisha Bandai Namuko Sutajio) (BNSI) is a Japanese video game developer headquartered in Kōtō, Tokyo with studios in Malaysia. Founded in 2012 as Namco Bandai Studios, it is a subsidiary and development arm of publisher Bandai Namco Entertainment (formerly Bandai Namco Games), which itself is part of the wider Bandai Namco Holdings group. The company works under its parent company as a keiretsu; Bandai Namco Studios creates video games for home, arcade, and mobile platforms, while Bandai Namco Entertainment handles the distribution, marketing, and publishing of these products.

The studio was established as a spin-off company of Namco Bandai Games's video game development divisions, based on restructuring efforts and the need for a decrease in development times and increase in productivity. Over 1,000 staff from Namco Bandai Games and additional from the defunct Namco Tales Studio division were absorbed into BNS. Bandai Namco Studios has worked on many successful video game franchises, including Tekken, Pac-Man, The Idolmaster, Ace Combat, Tales, and Soulcalibur, in addition to original intellectual properties such as Code Vein and Scarlet Nexus. Much like Namco developed games with Nintendo as the publisher since the GameCube, the company has also developed several games for them as Bandai Namco Studios, namely the Super Smash Bros. series beginning with the fourth installment, Wii Sports Club, Kirby Air Riders, and spin-offs in the Pokémon franchise like Pokkén Tournament and New Pokémon Snap. The company is a strong advocate of video game preservation, preserving key art, design documents, and other resources for its games.

== History ==
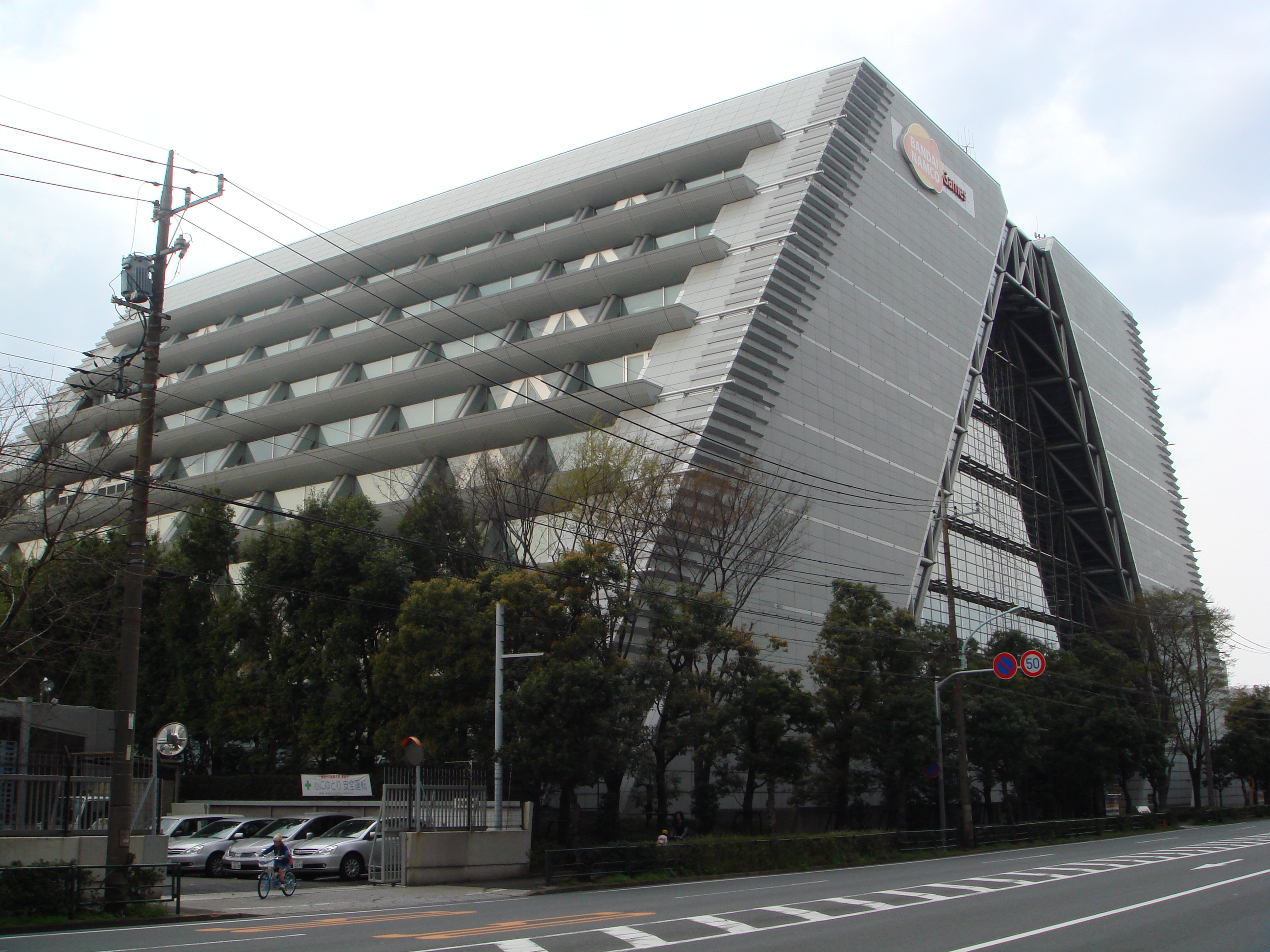
Namco Bandai Studios' headquarters in Shinagawa, Tokyo from April 2012 to 2015. It shared the building with both Namco Bandai Games and Namco Bandai Holdings.

Established on March 31, 2006, Namco Bandai Games was the amalgamation of Namco and Bandai's video game development operations being merged and consolidated into one company. The developer produced the majority of its video games in-house, through its subsidiaries such as Banpresto and D3 Publisher, or lending production to external studios. However, as the company was recovering from financial losses and was undergoing a reorganization, Namco Bandai Games believed it was necessary to spin off its game development operations into a separate division. The company requested for faster development times and healthy relations between its multiple business areas, and believed the formation of a new company would remedy this.

Previous logo was used until 2022.

Namco Bandai's video game operations were transferred to a new subsidiary, Namco Bandai Studios Inc., on April 2, 2012. Located in Shinagawa, Tokyo, the company was headed by company veteran Hajime Nakatani and became a wholly owned subsidiary of Namco Bandai Games. Its parent company stated that Studios would allow for faster development times, tighter cohesion with aligning production teams, and more creative freedom and developer skills for its employees. Namco Bandai's consecutive financial increases in its year-over-year profits also contributed to its establishment. Studios inherited 1,000 employees from Namco Bandai Games and all 80 staff members from the former Namco Tales Studio, which ceased operations a year earlier. It would focus on the development of new intellectual properties and follow-ups to established franchises, such as Tekken, Pac-Man, and Ace Combat. The two companies would work in conjunction with one another as a keiretsu, where Namco Bandai Studios would develop and plan games and Namco Bandai Games would handle marketing, publishing, and distribution.

Namco Bandai Studios opened two international divisions on March 1, 2013: Namco Bandai Studios Singapore Pte. Ltd. in Singapore, and Namco Bandai Studios Vancouver Inc. in Vancouver, Canada. The Singapore division was assigned as Namco Bandai's head video game development branch in Asia, and to establish working relationships with fellow developers in the region. The Vancouver division was to design online network games and provide content for North America and Europe, while simultaneously focusing on contributing to the country's growing game industry. Namco Bandai Studios Singapore employed several staff members from the Singapore division of LucasArts, who had previously worked on the cancelled Star Wars 1313. Its Japanese division established a working relationship with Nintendo with Wii Sports Club, a high-definition remaster of the original Wii Sports (2006) for the Wii U; several Nintendo games to follow were developed by Bandai Namco Studios, including Super Smash Bros. for Nintendo 3DS and Wii U (2014), Pokkén Tournament (2015), Super Smash Bros. Ultimate (2018) and New Pokémon Snap (2021).

On April 1, 2014, Namco Bandai Studios was renamed Bandai Namco Studios Inc., following an effort by its parent company to unify the Bandai Namco brand across its international divisions. The company began development on virtual reality arcade games the same month, which were designed for Bandai Namco Entertainment's VR Zone chain of video arcades. In 2016, Bandai Namco Studios released Summer Lesson, a virtual reality game designed for the PlayStation VR headset. The Vancouver division closed on November 16, 2018, though a "skeleton crew" was kept to support Tekken Mobile, while a Malaysia division was opened in Selangor in 2016. Bandai Namco Studios won the "Grand Prize" award at the Japan Game Awards for its work on Super Smash Bros. Ultimate, as well as the "Japan Game Awards 2019 Minister of Economy, Trade and Industry Award" from the organization. Bandai Namco Research Inc. was established in 2019 with some of the research and development departments of Bandai Namco Studios being transferred to this completely new company.

In October 2021, Bandai Namco Studios announced the establishment of the indie label GYAAR Studio within the studio. They plan to release at least one independent game title per year, where each title will be developed by a team of creators from among the studio's young staff. Their first game Survival Quiz City will be published by Phoenixx.

On November 14, 2023, Bandai Namco Studios revealed for the first time that they now have two dedicated teams called Studio 2 and Studio S for commissioned projects for other publishers, with Nintendo being the main contributor for the past works and likely for future works. Studio S has focused on supporting the Mario Kart series since 2014 as well as Arms, while Studio 2 has been mainly involved in the Super Smash Bros. series since the 4th installment as the lead development studio.

In July 2024, B.B. Studio, which was in the past a subsidiary of parent company Bandai Namco Entertainment became a direct subsidiary of Bandai Namco Studios. On March 3, 2025, Bandai Namco announced the change of name of B.B. Studio to Bandai Namco Forge Digitals.

In November 2025, Bandai Namco sold 80% of Bandai Namco Studios Singapore to Nintendo, with the latter becoming a subsidiary of Nintendo as Nintendo Studios Singapore.

== Staff and design philosophy ==
Bandai Namco Studios identifies itself as the successor to Namco, focusing on its predecessor's design philosophies and corporate environment. The company emphasizes creating unique and immersive experiences in games, and is against copying ideas from other developers. Many of its employees were originally employed at Namco:

- Daisuke Uchiyama – President and CEO. Producer for many of Bandai Namco's anime fighting games, particularly those from the Dragon Ball series.
- Shigeru Yokoyama – Company chairman. Designer of Galaga and Splatterhouse, and supervisor of franchises such as Xenosaga.
- Kazutoki Kono – Head of Project Aces, the internal development team behind the Ace Combat series.
- Minoru Sashida – Manager of the master art preservation program. Artist for the Mr. Driller series, Techno Drive, and Ace Combat 3: Electrosphere.

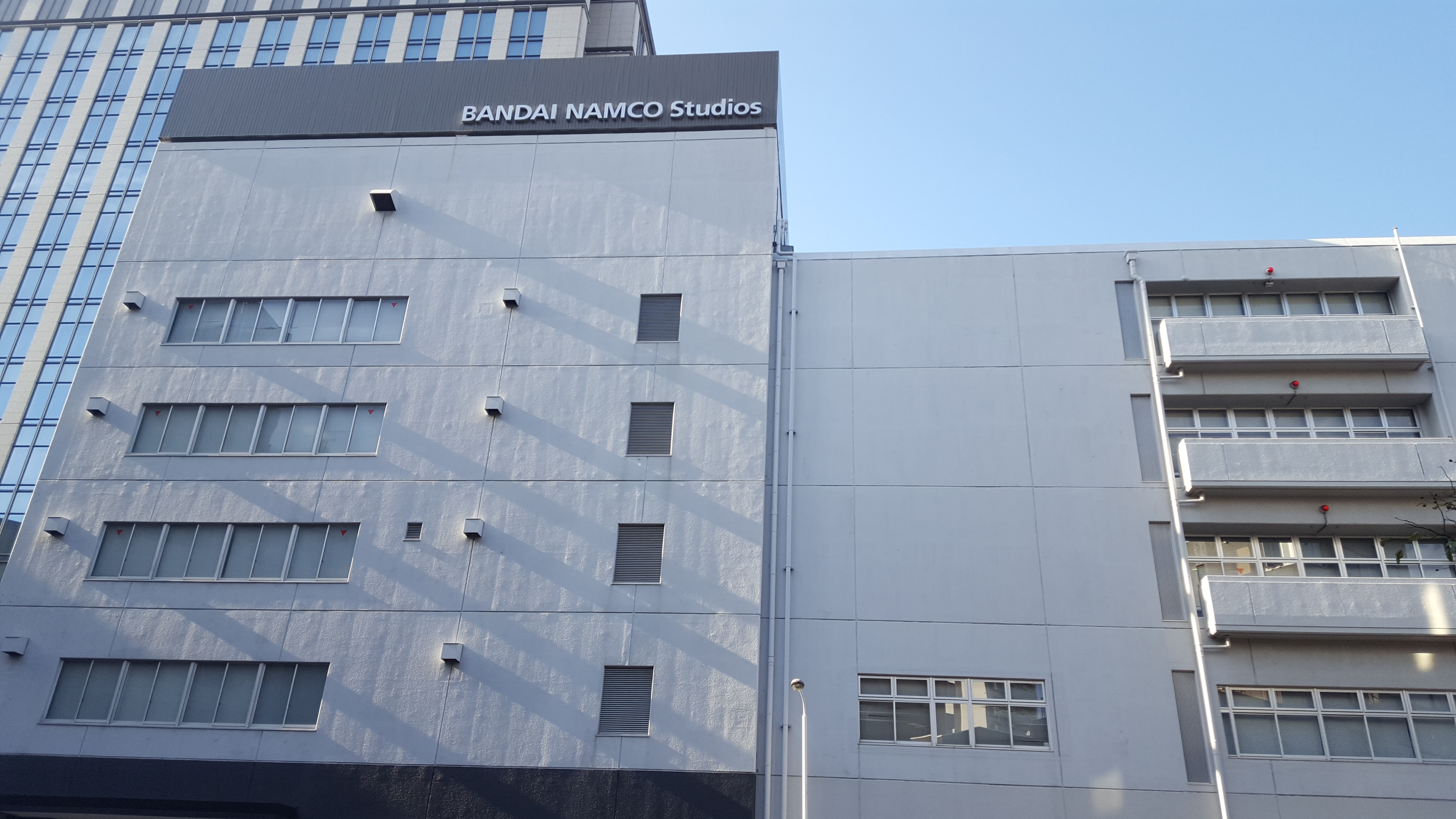
During the move to its Kōtō office in 2015, several of Bandai Namco Studios' master arts were deemed lost, though several have since been recovered.

Bandai Namco Studios is a strong advocate of video game preservation. In particular, it sees the master art used for supplementary material in games, such as Galaxian (1979) and Pac-Man (1980), as being of historical importance; the company believes preserving these master arts allows for further appreciation of its predecessor's games as well as the arts themselves. Studios has amassed a collection of 400 master arts, including those from Xevious (1983), Ridge Racer (1993), and J-League Soccer Prime Goal (1993), which it stores in an internal department named the "Banarchive". Many of its pieces were originally deemed lost during its move to Kōtō in 2015, though most have since been recovered. Bandai Namco Studios hopes to easily share its master arts to the public in the form of YouTube retrospective videos and a virtual reality museum through its Namco Museum of Art project.

In addition to its master arts, Bandai Namco Studios has also preserved promotional pamphlets, source code, master models for characters, design documentation, and release dates for all video games by Namco, Bandai, and Banpresto. Other divisions within Bandai Namco Holdings and external companies have used these arts for products such as apparel and posters. Hisaharu Tago, the producer of the Nintendo Switch release of Namco Museum, hopes the company will be able to bring the entirety of Namco's back catalog for modern gaming platforms.

== Development organization ==
Bandai Namco Studios currently have six internal divisions in Japan dedicated to development under the company, who has shared the organization of its divisions as in 2023, being organized as the following:

- Studio 1: With 257 employees, Studio 1 mainly works on the Tekken, Soulcalibur, and the Ace Combat series, with the most recent titles worked being Tekken 8 and Ace Combat 7: Skies Unknown, and have also worked on God Eater 3, Pokkén Tournament and in the new IP Code Vein.
- Studio 2/Studio S: With 152 employees, Studio 2 and Studio S have mainly worked on Nintendo published games before at Bandai Namco Studios, be it in small/medium contract work or large contract work. Studio 2 mainly works on large contract work, leading development of their own games, with those being Super Smash Bros. for Nintendo 3DS and Wii U, Mario Sports Superstars, Super Smash Bros. Ultimate and Kirby Air Riders. Studio S works on small/medium contract work, supporting titles with visual assets, graphics and design for Nintendo EPD Production Group No. 9 titles such as Mario Kart 8, Mario Kart 8 Deluxe, Arms, Mario Kart Tour and Mario Kart World.
- Studio 3: With 377 employees, Studio 3 mainly works on the Tales and The Idolmaster series, with the most recent titles worked being Tales of Arise and The Idolmaster Starlit Season, and have also worked on new IP such as Scarlet Nexus and Blue Protocol.
- Development Enchantment Studio: This division was established in 2023 with the aim of improving the quality of developed titles and promoting internal organization and human resources development company-wide in collaboration with each division. The division includes a team in charge of user research and analysis of developed titles, as well as Gya Studio, which was established as a place for young creators to directly express their ideas and have released games such as Survival Quiz City and Goonect, among many others.
- Technology Studio: With 296 employees, this division is primarily responsible for cross-organizational technology research and development that is utilized throughout the company. Specifically, they contribute to improving the game experience through motion capture, online technology, sound production, animation production, AI technology, interpretation/translation, etc., to accelerate efficiency of all types of development, and support game development thorough Bandai Namco and external partners.

== Games ==
Year	Title	Platform	Publisher	Ref.
2013	Tales of Hearts R	PlayStation Vita	Namco Bandai Games	
2013	Wii Sports Club	Wii U	Nintendo	
2013	Drift Spirits	iOS	Namco Bandai Games	
2013	The Idolmaster Million Live!	Android, iOS, Microsoft Windows	Namco Bandai Games	
2014	Super Smash Bros. for Nintendo 3DS and Wii U	Nintendo 3DS, Wii U	Nintendo	
2014	The Idolmaster One For All	PlayStation 3	Bandai Namco Games	
2015	Tekken 7	Arcade, Microsoft Windows, PlayStation 4, Xbox One	Bandai Namco Entertainment	
2015	Pac-Man 256	iOS, Android, Microsoft Windows, PlayStation 4, Xbox One	Bandai Namco Entertainment	
2015	Galaga: Tekken 20th Anniversary Edition	Android, iOS	Bandai Namco Entertainment	
2015	The Idolmaster Must Songs	PlayStation Vita	Bandai Namco Entertainment	
2015	Tales of Zestiria	Microsoft Windows, PlayStation 3, PlayStation 4	Bandai Namco Entertainment	
2015	Pac-Man Bounce	Android, iOS	Bandai Namco Entertainment	
2015	Lost Reavers	Wii U	Bandai Namco Entertainment	
2015	Pokkén Tournament	Arcade, Nintendo Switch, Wii U	Bandai Namco Entertainment; The Pokémon Company	
2016	Tales of Berseria	Microsoft Windows, PlayStation 3, PlayStation 4	Bandai Namco Entertainment	
2016	The Idolmaster Platinum Stars	PlayStation 4	Bandai Namco Entertainment	
2016	Pac-Man Championship Edition 2	Microsoft Windows, Nintendo Switch, PlayStation 4, Xbox One	Bandai Namco Entertainment	
2016	Tap My Katamari	Android, iOS	Bandai Namco Entertainment	
2016	Arcade Game Series	Microsoft Windows, PlayStation 4, Xbox One	Bandai Namco Entertainment	
2016	Summer Lesson	PlayStation 4	Bandai Namco Entertainment	
2017	Namco Museum	Nintendo Switch	Bandai Namco Entertainment	
2017	Naruto x Boruto Ninja Voltage	Android, iOS	Bandai Namco Entertainment	
2017	Mario Sports Superstars	Nintendo 3DS	Nintendo	
2017	Mario Kart Arcade GP VR	Arcade	Bandai Namco Entertainment	
2017	The Idolmaster Million Live Theater Days	Android, iOS	Bandai Namco Entertainment	
2017	The Idolmaster Stella Stage	PlayStation 4	Bandai Namco Entertainment	
2017	Tales of the Rays	Android, iOS	Bandai Namco Entertainment	
2018	Go Vacation	Nintendo Switch	Bandai Namco Entertainment	
2018	Soulcalibur VI	Microsoft Windows, PlayStation 4, Xbox One	Bandai Namco Entertainment	
2018	Ichimōdajin! Mosquito Patchin Daisakusen	Arcade	Bandai Namco Amusement	
2018	Pac-In-Town	Arcade	Bandai Namco Amusement	
2018	The Idolmaster Shiny Colors	Android, iOS, Microsoft Windows	Bandai Namco Amusement	
2018	Tekken Mobile	Android, iOS	Bandai Namco Entertainment	
2018	Galaga Fever	Arcade	Bandai Namco Amusement	
2018	Taiko no Tatsujin: Drum 'n' Fun!	Nintendo Switch	Bandai Namco Entertainment	
2018	Taiko no Tatsujin: Drum Session	PlayStation 4	Bandai Namco Entertainment	
2018	Super Smash Bros. Ultimate	Nintendo Switch	Nintendo	
2018	God Eater 3	Microsoft Windows, PlayStation 4, Nintendo Switch	Bandai Namco Entertainment	
2019	Ace Combat 7: Skies Unknown	Microsoft Windows, PlayStation 4, Xbox One	Bandai Namco Entertainment	
2019	Code Vein	Microsoft Windows, PlayStation 4, Xbox One	Bandai Namco Entertainment	
2020	Mobile Suit Gundam: Extreme Vs. Maxi Boost ON	PlayStation 4	Bandai Namco Entertainment	
2020	Taiko no Tatsujin: Rhythmic Adventure Pack	Nintendo Switch	Bandai Namco Entertainment	
2021	New Pokémon Snap	Nintendo Switch	The Pokémon Company; Nintendo	
2021	Survival Quiz City	Microsoft Windows	Phoenixx	
2021	The Idolmaster SideM Growing Stars	Android, iOS	Bandai Namco Entertainment	
2021	Scarlet Nexus	Microsoft Windows, PlayStation 4, PlayStation 5, Xbox One, Xbox Series X/S	Bandai Namco Entertainment	
2021	Tales of Arise	Microsoft Windows, PlayStation 4, PlayStation 5, Xbox One, Xbox Series X/S	Bandai Namco Entertainment	
2021	The Idolmaster Starlit Season	Microsoft Windows, PlayStation 4	Bandai Namco Entertainment	
2022	Goonect	Microsoft Windows	Phoenixx	
2023	Hook and Kaiju	Microsoft Windows	Phoenixx	
2023	Endrays	Microsoft Windows	Phoenixx	
2023	Excycle	Microsoft Windows	Phoenixx	
2023	Shigeru Planet	Microsoft Windows	Phoenixx	
2023	Blue Protocol	Microsoft Windows, PlayStation 5, Xbox Series X/S	Bandai Namco Entertainment	
2024	Tekken 8	Microsoft Windows, PlayStation 5, Xbox Series X/S	Bandai Namco Entertainment	
2024	Project: Judge Visions	VR	ADOOR	
2024	Boomeroad	Microsoft Windows	Phoenixx	
2024	Nottolot	Microsoft Windows	Phoenixx	
2024	Doronko Wanko	Microsoft Windows	Phoenixx	
2024	Survival Quiz CITY	Microsoft Windows	Phoenixx	
2024	SPIHOSPI ID:PL18	Android, iOS	Hike	
2025	Hirogami	Microsoft Windows, PlayStation 5	Kakehashi Games	
2025	Shadow Labyrinth	Microsoft Windows, Nintendo Switch, PlayStation 5, Xbox Series X/S	Bandai Namco Entertainment	
2025	Kirby Air Riders	Nintendo Switch 2	Nintendo	
2026	Code Vein II	Windows, PlayStation 5, Xbox Series X/S	Bandai Namco Entertainment	
2026	Biohazard RE:2 Arcade	Arcade	Bandai Namco Entertainment	
2027	Gundam: Rogue Orbit	Windows, PlayStation 5, Xbox Series X/S	Bandai Namco Entertainment	
