= Scarlet Nexus =

2021 video game

- Developers: Bandai Namco Studios; Tose
- Publisher: Bandai Namco Entertainment
- Director: Kenji Anabuki
- Producer: Keita Iizuka
- Designers: Tatsuya Watanuki; Kohei Rukugawa
- Programmer: Kakeru Nakamura
- Artist: Kota Ochiai
- Writers: Takumi Miyajima; Asana Inoki; Yasuyo Takahashi; Mio Goto
- Composer: Hayata Takeda
- Engine: Unreal Engine 4
- Platforms: PlayStation 4; PlayStation 5; Windows; Xbox One; Xbox Series X/S
- Release: June 25, 2021
- Genre: Action role-playing
- Mode: Single-player

Scarlet Nexus is a 2021 action role-playing game developed by Bandai Namco Studios and Tose, and published by Bandai Namco Entertainment. The game was released for PlayStation 4, PlayStation 5, Windows, Xbox One and Xbox Series X/S on June 25, 2021. It received generally positive reviews from critics, with praise for the combat, but criticism for its side missions. It sold 1 million units by April 2022.

== Gameplay ==
Scarlet Nexus is an action role-playing game played from a third-person perspective. Players can assume control of either Yuito Sumeragi or Kasane Randall, members of the Other Suppression Force (OSF) who are tasked to defend New Himuka from creatures known as the Others. While they are equipped with short-range weapons like a sword, both Yuito and Kasane possess the ability of psychokinesis, allowing them to hurl objects and debris at hostile enemies. The protagonist's powers can be upgraded through accessing the "brain map", which serves as the game's skill tree. As players progress through the story, they encounter different party members who assist them in combat. Each companion has their own unique combat abilities, which can then be temporarily borrowed by the protagonists through an ability named "brain link", powered by the Struggle Arms System (SAS).

== Story ==
The game is set in the near future in an alternate reality where humanity has developed technology and formed a society based on substances found in human brains that grant extrasensory superpowers. Humans without ESP are a minority disadvantged by the psychic interface of most telecommunications. The Other Suppression Force (OSF) recruits members with supernatural abilities to protect humanity from the Others - mindless mutants made from humans exposed to the matter of the 'Extinction Belt's orbiting earth, and which devour human brains.

The story is played through the perspectives of two New Himuka OSF members: Yuito Sumeragi and Kasane Randall. During a mission, Kasane's sister Naomi takes a bullet intended for Kasane that metamorphizes her into an Other, revealing the ultimate origins of all Others. Naomi is then transported away by agents of Seiran, a rival settlement of New Himuka.

Much later, Kasane and Yuito accidentally create the Kunad Gate with their powers, an object akin to a black hole. Kasane is propelled into the future, alone. Here, Yuito's future self explains that the more he uses his powers, the more the Kunad Gate will envelop the world in the present and doom humanity, and the only way to stop it is to kill him. He also explains that they both have the special Red Strings, the gravikinetic power that allows time travel, which Yuito and Kasane have until now misinterpreted as simple telekinesis.

After Kasane returns to the present, the platoons split up. Yuito's platoon discovers that New Himuka has been conducting numerous inhumane experiments to create an army of Others, and wants to destroy the Extinction Belt. Meanwhile, Kasane's platoon joins Seiran. They learn that Seiran is also experimenting on Others and humans, and is searching for a way to revert Others back into humans. Seiran holds Naomi in their facility as leverage to ensure Kasane's continued support.

Kasane's platoon find Others being deployed in battle by Seiran. In the onslaught, Naomi appears and sacrifices her life to protect Kasane and her platoon. Prominent OSF member Karen Travers appears in time to witness the death of another human-turned-Other, Alice. Karen copies Yuito and Kasane's Red Strings ability using his ability to copy and use other powers. This transpires Karen's main objective: to save Alice, his OSF comrade, using Red Strings to time travel and prevent her metamorphosis.

Later, both platoons plan to close the Kunad Gate without killing Yuito. First, they attempt to access the isolated Togetsu city's supercomputer archive, but it shuts down upon their arrival. They realize that there was another Red Strings user who may be able to close the Kunad Gate, Wakana Sumeragi.

It is revealed that humanity as it currently exists originates from the Moon; humans fled to colonies to escape climate catastrophies long ago. The moon people eventually began to recolonize planet Earth, but we're severed from contact by a passing Comet made of a strange matter that forms the orbiting Extinction Belt. Togetsu is the last remnant of the moon people colonizers still aware of their origins.

Kasane uses her Red Strings to meet with Wakana on the day she died and bring her to the present day. Yuito and Kasane learn from Wakana that the archive's shutdown was actually an importation of Red Strings research to past users, including herself. Wakana instructs the two to unravel any entanglements, any trace of people who journeyed through time. Afterwards, Wakana reveals that she herself is an entanglement and that her death will erase the entanglement she created when she traveled to the present with Kasane. She returns to her time and lives out her last few moments before her death.

However, despite their efforts, the Kunad Gate remains unclosed. The platoons find out that Karen is the last entanglement as Karen travelled 2,000 years into the past and assassinated New Himuka's founder. That in turn caused this version of Karen to become linked with city supercomputer Arahabaki whilst in cold sleep, absorbing its knowledge and power. As such, Yuito, Kasane, and their platoons plead with Karen to unravel the last entanglement in order to close the Kunad Gate. Karen rejects their plea and plans to travel back in time one last time to save Alice from being metamorphosed into an Other. The group defeats Karen, and he finally agrees to assist them in closing the Kunad Gate. Using the combined powers of Arahabaki and all Red Strings users, the Extinction Belt is drawn into the Kunad Gate, eliminating them both forever. However, Karen copies the Red Strings power once more and leaps through time, rewriting history and saving Alice but eliminating himself from the timeline in the process.

Much later, everyone pays their respects to Karen and goes their separate ways.

== Development ==
Scarlet Nexus was co-developed by Bandai Namco Studios and Tose. Keita Iizuka is the game's producer while Kenji Anabuki served as the game's director, both of whom have worked on the Tales series. According to Iizuka, the term "Scarlet Nexus" means "red connection" or "red bond". Therefore, "objects or persons connected with red lines represent a big part in the visuals and key art" of the game. Artist Masakazu Yamashiro combined organic lifeforms and mechanical elements together in order to create unique design for the Others, the protagonists' enemies. In the game, while the Others invade merely to consume human brains, humanity has already developed a system to forecast their invasion. Game director Kenji Anabuki compared them to natural disasters that humans need to co-exist with. Given the game's theme, story and setting, Bandai Namco called Scarlet Nexus a "brain punk" game.

It was first announced during Microsoft's "Xbox 20/20" digital event, which took place on May 7, 2020. The game has been released for PlayStation 4, PlayStation 5, Windows, Xbox One and Xbox Series X/S on June 25, 2021.

The game was promoted with the release of SN-related apparel on Bandai Namco's online store, which was released on June 25, 2021. The animation scenes are produced by Sunrise. The game's theme song is "Dream In Drive" by The Oral Cigarettes, who would later perform the TV series' opening themes, "Red Criminal" and "MACHINEGUN".

== Related media ==
On March 18, 2021, an anime television series adaptation produced by Sunrise was announced and licensed by Funimation outside of Asia. Medialink and Madman Entertainment licensed the anime in the Asia-Pacific region. Hiroyuki Nishimura directed the series and Yōichi Katō, Toshizo Nemoto and Akiko Inoue wrote the series' scripts, with Nishimura and Yuji Ito designing the characters, and Hironori Anazawa composing the series' music. The series aired from July 1 to December 23, 2021.

== Reception ==
Reception

Aggregate score
Aggregator	Score
Metacritic	PC: 79/100; PS4: 80/100; PS5: 80/100; XSX: 77/100

Review scores
Publication	Score
Destructoid	8/10
Famitsu	34/40
Game Informer	8.75/10
GameSpot	7/10
GamesRadar+	3.5/5
IGN	8/10
Jeuxvideo.com	15/20
PCGamesN	6/10
VG247	3/5

Scarlet Nexus received "generally favorable reviews" from critics, according to review aggregator website Metacritic.

Particular praise was given to the game's combat systems, particularly the telekinesis powers of the two protagonists. IGN's Mitchell Saltzman wrote that "the ease of transition between the [telekinetic and melee attacks] is a really exciting and smooth mix of long-range and close-range combat." NME's Jon Bailes agreed, arguing that the game introduced new gameplay mechanics in an accessible way, and that it "build[s] slowly towards something very special. I took early satisfaction from the pendulum rhythm of sword attacks and telekinesis throws ... Complexity here is flexibility and dynamism."

Critics considered the optional side-quests to be a weak-point for the game overall, not meeting the standard of the main story quests, being mostly fetch quests. Polygon's George Yang also criticised the side-quests for failing to take advantage of the game's "rich lore and politics" as the game's themes "could have been explored even further for more world-building."

Scarlet Nexus was nominated for Best Role Playing Game at The Game Awards 2021, but lost to Tales of Arise, another game from Bandai Namco Entertainment.

=== Sales ===
In Japan, the PlayStation 4 version of Scarlet Nexus sold 20,160 physical units during its first week on sale, making it the fifth best-selling retail game of the week in the country. The PlayStation 5 version sold 11,008 units throughout the same week in Japan, making it the country's ninth best-selling retail game of the week. Scarlet Nexus was the fifth best-selling game of June 2021 in the United States, and was also the sixth best-selling game on both the Xbox and PlayStation charts that month.

By April 2022, the game had sold 1 million units and reached 2 million players.

By June 2026, the game had sold 2 million units.
