= God Eater (TV series) =

Japanese anime television series

- Original video animation

Prologue
- Directed by: Takayuki Hirao
- Produced by: Hikaru Kondo
- Written by: Takayuki Hirao
- Music by: Go Shiina
- Studio: Ufotable
- Released: September 28, 2009
- Runtime: 12 minutes
- Anime television series
- Directed by: Takayuki Hirao
- Produced by: Hikaru Kondo
- Written by: Takayuki Hirao; Kei Tsunematsu
- Music by: Go Shiina
- Studio: Ufotable
- Licensed by: AUS: Hanabee; NA: Aniplex of America; UK: MVM Entertainment
- Original network: Tokyo MX, Sun TV, KBS, BS11, KSS, EBC, OHK, JRT, Channel Neco
- Original run: July 12, 2015 – March 26, 2016
- Episodes: 13

God Eater (Japanese: ゴッドイーター, Hepburn: Goddo Ītā) is an anime adaptation of the God Eater video game. It is animated by Ufotable and began airing on July 12, 2015, after a one-week delay. It was later acquired by MVM Films in December 2017 for release that year.

== Plot ==
In 2071, an organization known as Fenrir, located in the post-apocalyptic nation of the New Asian Union (NAU), (Note: This country is a Union of Japan, South Korea, North Korea, Taiwan, Northeast China, and Far East Russia (except territories of Sakha, Zabaykalsky and Buryatia).) helps humanity protect itself against monsters known as Aragami using divine weapons called "God Arcs". Composed of biological material called "Oracle Cells", God Arcs are wielded by a group of soldiers called "God Eaters". The original (or "Old-Type") Arcs could initially only hold one form, either melee or ranged, but soon a new type of God Arc was developed that can switch between cannon and blade form.

== Characters ==
Characters	Japanese	English
Lenka Utsugi	Ryuichi Kijima	Robbie Daymond
Lindow Amamiya	Hiroaki Hirata	Kyle Hebert
Sakuya Tachibana	Sayaka Ohara	Michelle Ruff
Soma Schicksal	Kazuya Nakai	Crispin Freeman
Tsubaki Amamiya	Atsuko Tanaka	Mary Elizabeth McGlynn
Johannes Schicksal	Rikiya Koyama	Patrick Seitz
Kota Fujiki	Daisuke Sakaguchi	Lucien Dodge
Alisa Ilynichina Amiella	Maaya Sakamoto	Cherami Leigh
Licca Kusunoki	Chiaki Omigawa	Karen Strassman
Hibari Takeda	Kanae Itou	Erika Harlacher
Eric der Vogelweid	Takahiro Fujimoto	Tony Oliver

== Broadcast ==
A 12-minute prequel original video animation was made by Ufotable and aired on September 28, 2009. Ufotable later animated an anime television series directed by Takayuki Hirao with character designs by Keita Shimizu. The anime is part of the franchise's fifth anniversary. The series began airing on July 12, 2015, on Tokyo MX, BS 11, and other stations after the first episode was delayed by a week due to production issues and a special short titled God Eater Extra aired in its place. Four extra episodes have preempted regular episodes that were previously scheduled. After episode nine aired as the final initial run televised episode, the remaining episodes aired in March 2016. The opening theme is "Feed A" by Oldcodex and the ending theme is "Ruined Land" performed by Go Shiina feat. Naomi. Ufotable used hand-drawn animation to animate the God Arc weapons as opposed to computer animation.

No.	Title	Original release date
0	"God Eater Burst Prologue" (Japanese: ゴッドイーター)	September 28, 2009
In 2065, six years before the events of God Eater Burst, God Eater Soma, a new member of the Fenrir Far East Branch, travels to a strategic command base in former Russia for his first mission, accompanied by teammate Lindow and his older sister Tsubaki. They are instructed to assist troops in guiding an Aragami colony towards a nuclear fusion reactor, which will be detonated to wipe them all out. Soon afterward, the Aragami attack the reactor and breach its primary defense. With the reactor still preparing to reach its critical point for an explosion, Soma, Lindow, and Tsubaki battle the Aragami to keep them rooted to their position and distracted. Though the God Eaters outmatch the Aragami forces, the soldiers retreat at the behest of their captain, abandoning the trio at the reactor. The captain then manually detonates the reactor, but an unknown force absorbs the nuclear explosion, preventing it from doing any cataclysmic damage. Soma, Lindow, and Tsubaki survive, and are evacuated by helicopter. As Lindow asks Soma if he is still willing to come with them in "this messed-up world", a mysterious figure watches the helicopter depart in the desert below.
1	"Lenka Utsugi"; Transliteration: "Utsugi renka" (Japanese: 空木レンカ)	July 12, 2015
In the midst of an Aragami attack, classmates Lenka Utsugi and Kota Fujiki begin training under Tsubaki's orders. Hoping to go out and destroy as much Aragami as he could, Lenka voluntarily undergoes a strict, daily training regiment set up by himself, but winds up constantly failing his training missions. Hoping to cheer him up, Kota takes him to the weapons factory, where he is allowed to see his God Arc early. Later on, Aragami breach the settlement from both sides. With low numbers on the defense force, Lenka volunteers to go out and defeat the Aragami. Though Tsubaki turns down his request, he takes his God Arc and runs outside, with attempts at stopping him proving to be useless when he activates his Burst Mode. Reaching the middle of town, Lenka confronts several Aragami as they try to kill another God Eater, but one of them knocks his God Arc out of his hand. He is then rescued by the First Unit, consisting of God Eaters Soma, Lindow, and Sakuya, who easily dispatch most of the Aragami. Lenka then notices one remaining Aragami trying to kill a woman. Retrieving his God Arc, he transforms it into its gun form and kills it, impressing the members of the First Unit.
2	"Lindow Amamiya"; Transliteration: "Amamiya rindō" (Japanese: 雨宮リンドウ)	July 19, 2015
Lenka and the members of the First Unit, most notably Sakuya, remark on the transformation of Lenka's God Arc before more Aragami arrive. As the First Unit dispatches the Aragami, Lenka wishes to help, but Lindow dismisses him, telling him to hide. However, Lenka disobeys orders and fires upon multiple Aragami but is injured and rushed to a medical facility. When he regains consciousness, he is locked in a holding cell by Tsubaki to await court-martial for disobeying orders. The superiors at Fenrir eventually rule that Lenka must surrender his God Arc as punishment. When Johannes von Schicksal tries convincing them to let Lenka keep his God Arc due to the rarity of new-type users, he learns that another new-type user, Alisa, is on her way from the Russia Branch. During a dinner between members of the Defense Unit, Hibari Takeda mentions Lenka's attempts to fight the Aragami without a God Arc; Lindow mentions that there was another person sharing those capabilities but claims to not remember his identity. He then visits Lenka and asks him about the incident where Lenka begs Lindow to teach him how to fight. Meanwhile, the planes transporting Alisa come under attack from a swarm of flying Aragami. Tsubaki issues orders to dispatch Lindow and Sakuya, but Lindow mentions Lenka as an addition, which Tsubaki accepts. Lenka is released and joins Lindow and Sakuya on the battlefield.
3	"Alisa Ilynichna Omela"; Transliteration: "Arisa Irīnichina Amiēra" (Japanese: アリサ・イリーニチナ・アミエーラ)	July 26, 2015
Lindow, Sakuya, and Lenka arrive to rescue Alisa, but she insists on continuing to fight. As a new swarm of Aragami approaches, Lenka and Lindow descend onto Alisa's plane, with Lindow instructing Lenka to capture Alisa. However, Alisa retaliates, announcing her refusal to leave the plane or go with Lenka and Lindow so she could tend to other survivors of the attack, including Daigo Oguruma. Lenka explains the situation to Lindow, who explains that their only option of survival is rescuing Alisa only. Lenka refuses that course of action, and Alisa forges an alliance with him. After engaging the last of the Aragami, Alisa questions Lindow about the Far East Branch's practices, displeased by their apparent disregard for anyone who is not immediately useful to them. Suddenly, Sakuya announces the approach of a new, massive Oracle reaction and jumps out of the helicopter, intending to use it as a decoy. A massive Ouroboros arrives, stunning Lenka and Alisa into silence. A flashback displays the ability of Oracle cells to multiply and divide massively, as an induced reaction causes the formation of what appears to be the first Aragami.
4	"Aegis"; Transliteration: "Eijisu" (Japanese: エイジス)	August 9, 2015
Tsubaki introduces Johannes to Lenka and Alisa to the Director, and Johannes tells Lenka that his actions in protecting Alisa's transport have resulted in the suspension of all charges against him for insubordination. Tsubaki informs Lenka and Alisa that they will be formally assigned to the First Unit along with Kota Fujiki. While out with Kota, Lenka sees Aegis Island on the horizon and learns that the island will be able to shelter every human on Earth once completed. Later, Lenka and Kota accompany the rest of the First Unit on a mission to take down six Aragami. During the battle, Lindow laments Alisa's inability to fight as a team. After the mission, the First Unit encounters a group of civilians who lost most of their numbers in an Aragami attack and seek shelter at the Far East Branch. Though the First Unit agrees to take them to the base, Lenka witnesses the entire group being turned away upon arrival because none of them were judged to be compatible with a God Arc. He attempts to intervene but is stopped by Lindow. In a flashback, Johannes looks over a report regarding the incident with the Oracle cell mutation, then deletes a portion of it and replaces it with falsified information.
5	"An Eye for An Eye (All In Vain)"; Transliteration: "Adabana" (Japanese: 仇（徒）花)	August 16, 2015
Returning to the base, Lenka inquires about the Aegis Project with Hibari, who explains that the project is not yet complete. Meanwhile, Tsubaki gives Lenka, Sakuya, Kota, and Alisa their next mission, which is to extract the cores of two large-type Aragami, but Sakuya has her give another mission, much to the dissatisfaction of both Lenka and Kota, who wish to hunt a large-type instead. During the mission, the four kill two of the four targets, but are cornered by the other two. They are saved by a Dyaus Pita wreathed in a dark aura, which Alisa recognizes as the Aragami type that killed her parents. Flying into a rage, she charges at the Dyaus Pita, but it incapacitates her and the others, then begins attacking nearby civilians. With Sakuya and Kota still paralyzed, Lenka and Alisa attack the Dyaus Pita to stop it from killing more civilians, but it incapacitates both, breaks Lenka's God Arc, and massacres the rest of the civilians before Lenka's eyes. Kota and Sakuya recover and distract the Dyaus Pita long enough for Lenka to carry Alisa to safety, but the Dyaus Pita, continuing its attack on him, breaks the fragile land bridge supporting the three of them, sending them all plummeting into a river below.
6	"Stay True"; Transliteration: "Deichu no Hachisu" (Japanese: 泥中の蓮)	August 30, 2015
Despite a massive wound, Lenka manages to survive his fall into the river. He discovers Alisa unconscious and uses CPR to revive her. Upon regaining consciousness at an abandoned building, Alisa learns her God Arc is missing, as she leaves to look for it, she stops to see how injured Lenka is. Returning to his side, she performs basic first aid before noticing Lenka's destroyed God Arc. When an Aragami attacks the area, Lenka and Alisa take shelter; Lenka comments on the effectiveness of Alisa's first aid and wonders if his God Arc can be fixed, but Alisa remarks that his God Arc is dead. The two then decide to sneak out to search for Alisa's God Arc. Arriving back at the river, they notice the hilt of Alisa's God Arc in the water, but as she goes to pick it up, she is attacked by Aragami which triggers flashbacks of her parents' deaths and compromises her ability to fight. Lenka tries to save her and even uses his body as a human shield to protect Alisa, but Lindow arrives on the scene and saves them both. He then admonishes Lenka for his actions.
7	"A Flower in Bloom"; Transliteration: "Hokorobi" (Japanese: 綻び)	September 6, 2015
Lindow decides to take Lenka and Alisa to a secret sanctuary instead of heading to the extraction point. He reveals that the area is guarded by Aragami-infused trees, which are monitored and protected by Lindow. Lenka accompanies Lindow as he harvests Aragami cells from the trees and witnesses their offensive capability when an Aragami accidentally touches the tree. Meanwhile, Alisa muses about her previous encounter with the Aragami, which continues to traumatize her. An Aragami later breaches the sanctuary and manages to evade the trees. Lindow tells Lenka to protect the sanctuary and its people and to believe in his God Arc despite its damage. Coming up with a strategy, Lenka distracts the Aragami with various attacks until he obtains ampules to damage it. However, the Aragami puts up its defense mechanism, and Lenka uses the last ampule by powering his damaged God Arc, turning it into a monster that defeats the Aragami. Lindow notices Lenka's success while Alisa helplessly watches the events. In a flashback, Johannes and his team discover the Oracle cells evading a certain cell. Afterwards, their report is denied by the government. In the present day, Johannes oversees the development of Aegis on his computer.
8	"Sakuya Tachibana"; Transliteration: "Tachibana Sakuya" (Japanese: 橘 サクヤ)	September 20, 2015
Lenka and Alisa are rescued and brought back to the Far East Branch. Lenka's God Arc is sent in for repairs, while Alisa is transferred to a psychiatric ward. Meanwhile, Tsubaki tells Lindow about the Dyaus Pita, the type of Aragami Lenka fought, and mentions that Alisa has some connection to it. Lindow then goes off to explore Aegis Island. During a medical and physiological examination, Lenka learns that his internal wounds from the battle against the Pita have completely and miraculously healed. During a mission to kill a swarm of Aragami, the joint force assigned to the mission is outnumbered. Tsubaki orders a retreat, but Lenka, observing from the command center, instructs the joint force to go underground to find an exit, explaining that retreating above the ground will only result in further disaster. When it becomes clear that Lenka's plan leads to a successful mission, he is given command of the team and commended on his leadership. In the God Arc maintenance room, Sakaki informs Lenka that his God Arc snapped because his compatibility rate exceeded the weapon's capabilities, not from the Dyaus Pita's attack. Lenka also learns his heightened compatibility rate is caused by his God Arc's Oracle cells invading his body, and this rate will increase even more and hasten his death should he wield his God Arc further. In a flashback, Johannes, Sakaki, and Aisha remark on the test results of the Managarm Project. An earthquake rocks the entire planet, and enormous Oracle Cell spires rise from the ground all over the world, destroying anything in their vicinity. A colony of Oracle Cells is seen gathering as the first Aragami emerges from the ground.
9	"Soma Schicksal"; Transliteration: "Sōma Shikkuzāru" (Japanese: ソーマ・シックザール)	September 27, 2015
In a flashback to the first days of the Aragami outbreak, Johannes, Sakaki, and Aisha meet in a room overlooking the destruction, and they notice a building tipped with anti-Oracle cell lights, which they later called "Bias Factor." Johannes wonders if the Bias cell can be used as a weapon. In the present day, Lenka, curious about Soma's "grim reaper" nickname, realizes that Soma's surname is Schicksal, the same as Johannes. Later, Tsubaki outlines further details of the placement of the Aragami guidance devices with Lenka, before being called to train new recruits. Lenka asks why she stepped down as a God Eater. She doesn't believe Aragami can be fully exterminated but hopes the next generation will find a solution. Lenka and Soma are later sent on a mission to destroy more Aragami. When Soma hesitates to use his special attack against them, Lenka reaffirms that he has every right to exist as his person, as a beacon of hope rather than a harbinger of death. Hearing these words, Soma lets loose his special attack, killing the Aragami. Later, he confronts Lenka about having viewed his file and explains the futility of the Aegis plan as Aragami can never be truly destroyed. Lenka implores Soma to pass his hope for the future onto the next generation. In another flashback, Aisha is revealed as Soma's mother. As the episode ends, Sakaki finishes restoring Lenka's God Arc, which has taken a new form.
10	"Scattered Petals"; Transliteration: "Sange" (Japanese: 散華)	March 5, 2016
Fifteen years earlier, a child named Iroha Utsugi and her parents are among those denied entry into Fenrir since Fenrir only allows entry to God Arc candidates and their blood relatives, and they all test negative. Iroha's family adopt an abandoned baby and name him 'Lenka'. Eight years later, Iroha and Lenka's mother falls ill, so they join a search party to find medicine for the sick. Aragami attacks and kills everyone, but they escape. Cornered by multiple Aragami, Lindow rescues them and imparts a test kit to Iroha. Lenka then falls ill, so his mother dies after choosing to use the remaining medicine on him. Meanwhile, Lenka tests positive for compatibility with God Arc, but Iroha hides this result from him. A few years later, Aragami attacks their camp, and their father is trapped under debris. He convinces Lenka and Iroha to escape just before Aragami consumes him. After escaping, Iroha's wound infests and immobilizes her just as Aragami surrounds their hideout. She reveals to him, the results of his tests and requests him to join Fenrir. He refuses to abandon her, so she fatally slices her throat. Saddened, Lenka escapes while promising her "to overturn this world". Iroha apologizes to her parents for not being able to watch over him any more as before the Aragami consume her. The story returns to the present, where Lenka has successfully merged with his new and evolved God Arc.
11	"Operation Meteorite"; Transliteration: "Meteoraito" (Japanese: メテオライト)	March 12, 2016
God Eaters from all around the world convene in Fenrir for Operation Meteorite. After Captain Amamiya outlines the plan, she announces Lindow as the leader of the operation, but he suggests Lenka take his place. Lenka accepts the position, and all celebrate. Operation Meteorite commences, and all start killing the Aragami. Suddenly, an unknown device activates inside the dam, causing all Vajras to migrate in its direction. Lindow investigates and discovers it is also the location of a settlement of refugees denied access to Fenrir. Lindow goes to protect them alone as Aragami thwart the other units from joining him. Lenka thus decides to leave the command center to aid Lindow. In a flashback, Johannes and Aisha expect the birth of their child, but she is unable to deliver. The doctors perform a C-section, but flesh bursts out from her womb, instantly killing everyone in the operating room. Johannes survives thanks to Paylor's good-luck charm, which is composed of material that deflected the Oracle cells. He finds his newborn son inside the operating room and sees Aisha's whole body covered with flesh, except in one place with an Oracle crystal core.
12	"United They Stand"; Transliteration: "Dai-Ichi Butai" (Japanese: 第一部隊)	March 18, 2016
Lenka, armed with a new God arc, helps Lindow fight off the Vajras. Reasoning that someone must have activated another guiding device that suddenly distracted the Aragami, Lindow sets out to find it but encounters the Dyaus Pita. He fights it alone to allow the others to go protect the villagers.
13	"Lotus"; Transliteration: "Renge" (Japanese: 蓮華)	March 26, 2016
Lenka and the others rescue the villagers but are shocked to see the Dyaus Pita emerge without Lindow. Upset by his death, they engage it and Lenka ultimately kills it before collapsing from accelerated Oracle cell erosion. Upon recovering, Lenka becomes the new captain of the first unit with Alisa, Kota, Soma and Sakuya. While Soma is on a mission, a shadow can be seen looking over him who then brings various canned foods to an unseen man before stopping to smoke.
