= God Eater 3 =

2018 video game

- Developers: Bandai Namco Studios; Marvelous First Studio
- Publisher: Bandai Namco Entertainment
- Director: Ittetsu Suzuki
- Producer: Yuya Tomiyama
- Composer: Go Shiina
- Series: God Eater
- Platforms: PlayStation 4 Microsoft Windows; Nintendo Switch
- Release: PlayStation 4: JP: December 13, 2018; WW: February 8, 2019; Microsoft Windows: WW: February 8, 2019; Nintendo Switch: JP: July 11, 2019; WW: July 12, 2019
- Genre: Action role-playing
- Modes: Single-player, multiplayer

God Eater 3 is an action role-playing game developed by Bandai Namco Studios and Marvelous and published by Bandai Namco Entertainment. The third main entry in the God Eater series, the game was released for PlayStation 4 in Japan in December 2018, and worldwide in February 2019 for PlayStation and Microsoft Windows, with a Nintendo Switch version released in July 2019.

== Gameplay ==
Screenshot of God Eater 3

Like its predecessor, the game is an action role-playing game with hack and slash gameplay. Players are equipped with God Arc weapons which can be transformed. In the game, players are tasked to hunt massive monsters known as Aragami. The player character is a God Eater who can absorb energy from monsters to unleash "Burst Arts", special attacks that deal a lot of damage to enemies. Companion characters, which are controlled by artificial intelligence, assist in combat. Players can activate the Engage System to share combat perks with them during combat. The game can be played cooperatively with four other players, while assault missions accommodate up to 8 players. God Eater 3 introduced three new God Arc weapon-types as well.

- Biting Edge are a pair of dual blades with the highest attack speed but has the lowest damage out of all the weapon classes, and can transform into "Glaive Form" to increase damage output and mobility at the cost of stamina.
- Heavy Moon is a large moon-shaped blade that can transform into "Axe Moon Form", which increases in attack speed and damage the longer it is swung, and is very effective against Aragami with heavy armor, but the player cannot move while in Axe Form.
- Ray Gun is a gun that can fire continuous beam of laser that deals more damage the longer it is held down, and, unique to the weapon, has an Oracle Reserve system that stocks up OP up to two bars, allowing the player to fire the weapon longer.

The game also introduces Accelerator Triggers, passive abilities that when certain criteria are met in battle, will grant various temporary boosts. Accel Triggers' effects are shared when God Eaters are Engaged. Each Accel Trigger has its own experience gauge that increases the more the player use it in battle, similar to Burst Arts. When Accel Triggers level up, they increase in power and will occasionally unlock new Accel Triggers.

New types of Aragami are introduced to the game, including "Ashborn Aragami", a powerful type of Aragami capable of devouring and corrupting God Eaters, allowing it to enter a "Burst State". Ashborns who are in Burst will utilize new moves, deal more damage, and regenerate some of their health, while corrupted God Eaters will take significantly more damage and cannot be revived if downed, forcing them to respawn and lose a lot of endurance.

Unlike previous games, God Eater 3 does not have re-releases, and additional gameplay and story contents after the main game are delivered through free post-release update.

== Setting ==
By the 2080s, Earth has been devastated and all-but overrun by the Aragami. To make matters worse, a calamity has caused outbreaks of an ash-like substance that corrodes anything it touches, and has spread across Europe, leaving vast stretches of uninhabitable area called the Ashlands which continue to grow over time and are crawling with Aragami. The headquarters of Fenrir, the God Eaters previous command organization, has been lost to the Ash, and Fenrir's outposts have all become isolated. The only human habitations that remain in the sea of ash around HQ are underground facilities called "Ports," built in the ruins of Fenrir satellite bases. These defend themselves with a new type of God Eaters: Adaptive God Eaters (AGEs) specialized to resist the Ash and having increased combat capability, but often are treated as little more than hounds. The Ports are unified under the Gleipnir organization, successors to Fenrir planning to retake the Ashlands, while an AGE-based resistance organization named the Crimson Queen opposes Gleipnir seeking to adapt to the Ashlands instead. In addition to the Aragami threat, Ash Storms arise to obliterate anything in their path and, even worse, a breed of enhanced and hyper-lethal Aragami, called Ashborn, have emerged.

== Plot ==
The protagonist and their friends mechanic Keith, close-quarters fighter Zeke, and their leader Hugo, serve out their contract to Port Pennywort hunting Aragami. The Port, however, treats AGEs as inhuman, sending them on hazardous missions. When an Ash Storm engulfs the Port, the management flees leaving the AGEs for dead, but they are rescued by Hilda Henriquez, owner of Port Chrysanthemum. Carrying precious Gleipnir cargo under the guard of Claire Victorious, a Gleipnir support-type AGE, Hilda agrees to take on the Pennywort AGEs as passengers but under Ash Navigation Law she will have to return them to the Port later. The group carries out work for Hilda clearing a safe route through the Ashlands for a cut of royalties, with Hugo planning to buy their freedom and establish their own Port. Along the way to Chrysanthemum, the group takes in Lulu, a formidable scout AGE from Port Baran who was marooned during a mission. In exchange she shares a prototype for an Acceleration Trigger, which Keith finishes. When an Ashborn's attack tears open the crawler's cargo bay, the precious cargo is revealed: a mysterious little girl whom the group names Phym, with the power to heal wounds and purge the corruption caused by Ashborn. The Aragami attacks only increase, suspected to be drawn to Phym's presence, but with her help and the protagonist's Resonance powers the group manages to kill an Ashborn, a feat previously unheard of. Arriving at Hilda's port, Hugo's group negotiates a contract with her.

Finally arriving at Gleipnir HQ, Doctor Inukai collects Phym, but an Ashborn attack allows the group to reclaim her. Defeating the monster, they convince the organization's leader, Governor General Abraham Gadolin, that Phym, revealed to be a highly prized humanoid Aragami specimen, is safest in their hands as only they can kill the Ashborn who are constantly drawn to her. In exchange, they are requested to spearhead an operation to take back Fenrir HQ and Odin, a superweapon capable of eliminating the Ash threat. Investigating a mole in Gleipnir, Hilda and the group discover that Inukai is the traitor, planning to sell Phym to the Crimson Queen, led by Gadolin's son Werner, with the technology to trigger Ash Storms (at the cost of an AGE's life). Inukai is arrested and the reclamation is launched with the AGEs at its head. The Baran convoy's captain threatens Lulu to use the Crimson Queen (to whom they had sold the Ash Storm tech in the first place) to take Phym for themselves, but is also arrested and Baran drops out of the initiative to save face. Werner meets the group, offering them a place within Crimson Queen and allows them to proceed to HQ where they complete the operation. Gleipnir to retake HQ and Odin, while the group returns to Port Chrysanthemum.

A month later, Gadolin announces Odin's completion, but reveals that, in order to use it, AGEs will have to be consumed by the weapon. Thus, Gleipnir plans to round up all AGEs and force them into the machines. AGEs in all ports revolt, many joining Werner, and Port Baran openly sides with the Crimson Queen. Despite being blockaded, Hilda refuses to hand over the group, evacuating the Port on her crawler. Forced to traverse a forbidden mountain route to escape, the group defeats a deadly "AGE Eater" Aragami, saving Zeke's lost brother Neal. Arriving at Port Dusty Miller, they are sheltered by its owner Ein whom Hilda has contact Werner. He reveals that Phym, with her unique bias factor, could take the place of all the AGEs onboard Odin. Learning this herself, Phym leaves to voluntarily board the weapon. Meanwhile, Baran betrays the Crimson Queen, and Gleipner wipes out the group. Cornered, Werner and the last members summon an apocalyptic Ash Tempest, so Odin is hurriedly fielded to stop it. She narrowly manages to stop its first wave without dying, but the strain on her rushed Odin unit causes it to go berserk so the group defeats it. Reunited with the others, Phym triggers a massive Engage Resonance across the Ashlands, neutralizing the ash's corrosive properties and ending the tempest. With the conflict ended and Odin shut down, the group returns home together. In the final voiceover, Ein, actually Soma Schicksal from the previous games under an alias, ponders the possible future for the world and sets out to travel to the Far East.

== Development ==
Marvelous replaced Shift as the game's developer since Bandai Namco wanted to create a game that significantly differed from its predecessors and partnered with Bandai Namco Studios to develop the game. The game's introduction sequence was created by Japanese animation studio Ufotable. Unlike previous entries in the series, the game was not designed for handheld platforms. The game was released in Japan for PlayStation 4 on December 13, 2018, worldwide for PlayStation 4 and Microsoft Windows on February 8, 2019, and for Nintendo Switch on July 12.

== Reception ==
Reception

Aggregate score
Aggregator	Score
Metacritic	PC: 71/100; PS4: 71/100; NS: 74/100

Review scores
Publication	Score
Destructoid	7.5/10
Famitsu	PS4: 32/40
GameRevolution	3/5
GameSpot	6/10
Hardcore Gamer	3.5/5
IGN	PS4: 7.6/10
Nintendo Life	8/10

Japanese gaming magazine Famitsu awarded the game a score of 32/40. On PlayStation 4, the game received "mixed or average reviews" according to review aggregator Metacritic. GameSpot Ginny Woo enjoyed the game's characters and story, but criticized the game's difficulty curve. On IGN, David Jagnaeux praised the game for its combat calling it: "An exciting take on the Monster Hunter formula, even if its lackluster story and somewhat unvaried content keep it from being the best it could be".

=== Sales ===
In Japan, approximately 20,960 physical copies for Switch were sold during its launch week, becoming the number two selling game of any format in the country's retail market. The PS4 version of the game opened at approximately 150,523 copies (inclusive of limited edition) during its first week in Japan, and a total of 174,834 copies by the end of 2018, making it the 26th most-sold title in Japan that year.

In Japan, the PS4 version has sold 203,554 copies while the Switch version is at 28,770 copies sold.
