= List of Code Geass light novels =

Cover of the first Code Geass light novel released in Japan.

The anime series Code Geass by Sunrise has been adapted into various series of light novels. First serialized in Kadokawa Shoten's The Sneaker magazine, they are divided into two separate series corresponding with the series two seasons. The first series, Code Geass: Lelouch of the Rebellion, spanned five volumes with the first, labelled as volume 0, released in Japan on April 28, 2007, and the last on February 29, 2008. All five volumes in the first series of novels have been released in English by Bandai Visual as licensed in December 2007. The first volume was released in November 2008 and the last one on February 23, 2010.

The series focus on how the former prince Lelouch Lamperouge obtains a power known as Geass and decides to use it destroy the Holy Britannian Empire. The first novel acts as a prologue, focusing on how Lelouch befriended Suzaku Kururugi, the son of Japan's last prime minister, when the former and his sister Nunnally Lamperouge were sent to Japan as political hostages.

The second novel series, Code Geass: Lelouch of the Rebellion R2, covers the second season of the anime series in which Lelouch continues his battle against the Britannian Empire. It was released in four volumes from May 31, 2008, to February 28, 2009. A single volume side story novel, Code Geass: Lelouch of the Rebellion Red Tracks (コードギアス 反逆のルルーシュ 朱の軌跡, Kōdo Giasu: Hangyaku no Rurūshu Shu no Kiseki) was released on March 29, 2008, in Japan. It focuses on the life of teenage girl Kallen Stadtfeld who becomes a soldier from the organization the Black Knights under Lelouch's leadership to defeat Britannia.

== Volume list ==
=== Code Geass: Lelouch of the Rebellion ===
==== First episode ====
No.	Title	Original release date	English release date
1	Stage 0: Entrance	April 28, 2007; 978-4-04-422307-6	November 4, 2008; 978-1594099816
2	Stage 1: Shadow	June 30, 2007; 978-4-04-422308-3	March 3, 2009; 978-1594099823
3	Stage 2: Knight	September 29, 2007; 978-4-04-422309-0	August 25, 2009; 978-1594099830
4	Stage 3: Sword	December 28, 2007; 978-4-04-422310-6	November 3, 2009; 978-1594099847
5	Stage 4: Zero	February 29, 2008; 978-4-04-422311-3	February 23, 2010; 978-1604961850

==== Red Tracks ====
No.	Title	Japanese release date	Japanese ISBN
1	Code Geass: Lelouch of the Rebellion Red Tracks; Kōdo Giasu: Hangyaku no Rurūshu Shu no Kiseki (コードギアス 反逆のルルーシュ 朱の軌跡)	March 29, 2008	978-4-04-422312-0

==== Second episode ====
No.	Title	Original release date	English release date
1	R2 Turn 1	May 31, 2008; 978-4-04-422313-7	January 2012; 978-1-60496-192-8
2	R2 Turn 2	August 30, 2008; 978-4-04-422314-4	—
3	R2 Turn 3	November 29, 2008; 978-4-04-422316-8	—
4	R2 Turn 4	February 28, 2009; 978-4-04-422320-5	—

=== Code Geass: OZ the Reflection ===
==== First episode ====
No.	Title	Japanese release date	Japanese ISBN
1	OZ the Reflection SIDE:Orpheus 1	July 10, 2013	978-4-79-860635-4
2	OZ the Reflection SIDE:Orpheus 2	February 26, 2014	978-4-79-860737-5
3	OZ the Reflection SIDE:Orpheus 3	September 26, 2014	978-4-79-860848-8

==== Second episode ====
No.	Title	Japanese release date	Japanese ISBN
1	OZ the Reflection O2 SIDE:Lyre 1	April 25, 2015	978-4-79-861006-1
2	OZ the Reflection O2 SIDE:Lyre 2	May 26, 2016	978-4-79-861230-0

=== Code Geass: Akito the Exiled ===
No.	Title	Japanese release date	Japanese ISBN
1	Akito the Exiled 1	July 6, 2013	978-4-04-120775-8
2	Akito the Exiled 2	December 6, 2013	978-4-04-120939-4
3	Akito the Exiled 3	June 25, 2016	978-4-04-103964-9
