= Code Geass: Rozé of the Recapture =

2024 four-part film by Yoshimitsu Ohashi

- Key visual for the first act of the series
- Japanese: コードギアス 奪還のロゼ
- Revised Hepburn: Kōdo Giasu: Dakkan no Rozé
- Type: Anime film series
- Genre: Science fantasy; Mecha
- Based on: Code Geass by Sunrise
- Directed by: Yoshimitsu Ōhashi
- Screenplay by: Noboru Kimura
- Story by: Gorō Taniguchi; Ichirō Ōkouchi
- Character designers: CLAMP (original); Takahiro Kimura; Shūichi Shimamura
- Music by: Kenji Kawai
- Country of origin: Japan
- Original language: Japanese

Production
- Art director: Kazuhiro Obata
- Sound director: Jin Aketagawa
- Cinematographer: Hiroyuki Chiba
- Color designers: Ami Kutsuna; Yuichi Kuboki
- CG director: Shūji Shinoda
- Editor: Kumiko Sakamoto
- Studio: Sunrise
- Producers: Hiroshi Morotomi; Yoshitaka Kawaguchi; Takuo Minegishi; Atsushi Yukawa
- Production companies: Code Geass Production Committee; Bandai Namco Filmworks
- Distributor: Showgate
- Runtime: 74 minutes (Act 1); 76 minutes (Act 2); 76 minutes (Act 3); 74 minutes (Final Act)

Original release
- Release: May 10, 2024 (Act 1); June 7, 2024 (Act 2); July 5, 2024 (Act 3); August 2, 2024 (Final Act)

Related
- Original net animation
- Licensed by: Disney Platform Distribution
- Released: June 21 – September 6, 2024
- Episodes: 12
- Anime television series
- Original network: MBS, TBS, CBC, BS-TBS
- Original run: July 11 – September 26, 2026
- Manga

Code Geass: Pure Almaria
- Written by: Fumiya Nagatsuki
- Illustrated by: Atsushi Soga
- Published by: Kadokawa Shoten
- Magazine: KadoComi
- Original run: January 24, 2025 – present
- Volumes: 2
- Preceded by
- Code Geass Lelouch of the Rebellion (2017–2018, three-part film); Code Geass Lelouch of the Re;surrection (2019, film)

Code Geass: Rozé of the Recapture (Japanese: コードギアス 奪還のロゼ, Hepburn: Kōdo Giasu: Dakkan no Roze) is a 2024 Japanese four-part animated science fantasy action film series directed by Yoshimitsu Ōhashi and written by Noboru Kimura from co-original story conceived by Gorō Taniguchi and Ichirō Ōkouchi; the four-part film series is based on the Code Geass franchise by Sunrise, who also produced the films. Distributed by Showgate, Rozé of the Recapture is a sequel to Code Geass Lelouch of the Re;surrection (2019), which itself takes place in an alternate continuity established in the three-part compilation film: Initiation, Transgression and Glorification (2017–18). Set in the Neo-Britannian Empire on former Hokkaido, the two brothers named Rozé (Kōhei Amasaki) and Ash (Makoto Furukawa) are tasked to rescue Hokkaido princess named Sakuya (Reina Ueda). Rozé of the Recapture was released in 2024, with the first film on May 10, the second film on June 7, the third film on July 5, and the final film on August 2.

Rozé of the Recapture was released internationally on Disney+ via Hulu and Star as a 12-episode original net animation (ONA) from June to September 2024. A TV broadcast of the ONA was later announced by Bandai Namco on the "Code Geass Project 'To 20th' Event" in December 2025, and aired on the Animeism programming block on MBS, TBS, CBC and BS-TBS between July 11 and September 26, 2026. A prequel manga series, Code Geass: Pure Almaria, written by Fumiya Nagatsuki and illustrated by Atsushi Soga, launched on Kadokawa's KadoComi digital platform on January 24, 2025.

== Plot ==
Following the death of Emperor Lelouch vi Britannia and the dissolution of the Holy Britannian Empire, remnants of the old empire captured the island of Hokkaido and founded the Neo-Britannian Empire, where the Japanese people are oppressed just like the old days of the empire when their country was one of its colonies. Two brothers named Rozé and Ash, dubbed "The Nameless Mercenaries" fight the Neo-Britannian empire, eventually joining forces with the local resistance forces in their mission to rescue princess Sakuya Sumeragi. Only a few know that Rozé is actually Sakuya in disguise, and the person she wants to rescue is her childhood friend and body double Sakura Haruyanaginomiya, who is passing as Sakuya to protect her. Her weapons are Ash's plotting skills, her tactical prowess and the power of Geass, which forces anyone into absolute obedience, the same power Lelouch himself once used in his rise to power.

== Episodes ==
Note: Each film act is divided into three parts (or episodes), which later stream internationally in a television series format as an ONA.

No.	Title	Directed by (Note: Production staff information is taken from the ending credits of each episode)	Storyboarded by	Chief animation directed by	Original release date	Streaming release date
Act 1
1	"Melting Snow"; Transliteration: "Yukige -Merutingu Sunō-" (Japanese: 雪解-Melting Snow-)	Akie Ishii & Takahiro Shikama	Yoshimitsu Ōhashi	Takahiro Kimura & Shuichi Shimamura	May 10, 2024	June 21, 2024
After the fall of the Holy Britannian Empire under Emperor Lelouch vi Britannia, imperial remnants invade Hokkaido and declare the Neo-Britannian empire behind a protective energy wall, preventing the Black Knights from liberating the region. Under the guise of counter-terrorism, the nobles Gran and Greede Kirkwayne regularly sadistically round up and kill innocent Japanese. Rozé and Ash, known as "The Nameless Mercenaries", are hired by resistance forces to eliminate the Kirkwaynes. Ash uses a Knightmare Frame to kill Greede, while Rozé infiltrates their residence and uses their Geass on Gran, who then commits suicide.
2	"Ice Wall"; Transliteration: "Hyōheki -Aisu Uōru-" (Japanese: 氷壁-Ice Wall-)	Akie Ishii	Shun Kudō & Akie Ishii	Shuichi Shimamura & Seiichi Nakatani	May 10, 2024	June 28, 2024
Rozé and Ash start working together with the Seven Shining Stars to take back Hokkaido; their mission is to rescue the leader of the Seven Shining Stars, Kensei Kuroto along with other members who are being held at the Abashiri Concentration Camp. Rozé also succeeds in rescuing Sakura, but later gets recaptured by Catherine.
3	"Raspberry"; Transliteration: "Kōka -Razuberī-" (Japanese: 紅霞-Raspberry-)	Moe Suzuki	Yoshimitsu Ōhashi	Takahiro Kimura & Shuichi Shimamura	May 10, 2024	July 5, 2024
With Kuroto back in command and Rozé's strategies, the Seven Shining Stars are strong enough to repel the Einberg's plans to exterminate the resistance forces; Rozé and Ash go off on their own to take a break; Ash rescues a girl from Britannians. Meanwhile, Sakura (as Sakuya) is ascended to the throne after Calis al Britannia's death.
Act 2
4	"Alliance"; Transliteration: "Hotarubi -Araiansu-" (Japanese: 蛍火-Alliance-)	Yoshinobu Tokumoto	Yoshiharu Ashino	Shuichi Shimamura	June 7, 2024	July 12, 2024
The Black Knights assist the Seven Shining Stars in freeing Hokkaido. However, the existence of the Neo-Britannian Sky Fortress Damocles causes chaos. As supplies and extra forces arrive from the Black Knights, a certain figure appears.
5	"Damocles"; Transliteration: "Kōbō -Damokurīzu-" (Japanese: 光芒-Damocles-)	Akie Ishii	Iwao Teraoka	Shuichi Shimamura	June 7, 2024	July 19, 2024
A rescue operation is launched to save the Japanese from the Sky Fortress Damocles and F.L.E.I.J.A.
6	"Lavender"; Transliteration: "Kinoe -Rabendā-" (Japanese: 薫衣-Lavender-)	Nozomu Kamiya	Susumu Nishizawa	Shuichi Shimamura	June 7, 2024	July 26, 2024
Under Kuroto's command, the struggling Seven Shining Stars, Rozé and Ash, have to make a last-minute decision in order to stop Damocles; Norland pays no attention to the ongoing battle and starts planning his next move with Christoph. Meanwhile, Walther discovers Sakura's real identity as Sakuya's decoy.
Act 3
7	"Hazy Moon"; Transliteration: "Oborodzuki -Hējī Mūn-" (Japanese: 朧月-Hazy Moon-)	Sachiko Kanno	Yoshimitsu Ōhashi	Shuichi Shimamura	July 5, 2024	August 2, 2024
Walther decides to keep Sakura's identity secret out of loyalty to Sakuya's family. Meanwhile, Rozé pays a visit to the orphanage where Ash was raised and discovers that he and his brother were adopted by Norland and raised to work for him as assassins. After Norland kills his brother, Ash rebels and is imprisoned, where he meets and befriends Sakuya's father, who dies while attempting to escape with Ash. After escaping, Ash met Sakuya, who used her Geass to make him protect her as if she were the most important person to him, making him view her as his late brother. Ridden with guilt, Rozé is captured by Christoph, who discovered the truth about her identity and her Geass.
8	"Ginto"; Transliteration: "Ginto -Ginto-" (Japanese: 銀兎-Ginto-)	Morihito Abe	Susumu Nishizawa	Seiichi Nakatani	July 5, 2024	August 9, 2024
Christoph maintains Sakuya imprisonment, intending to run experiments with her Geass. Meanwhile, the Neo Britannian Army storms the Seven Shining Stars hideout. The other resistance forces arrive to protect them, but their leaders end up sacrificing themselves to let the others escape. Amidst the battle, Ash fights Arnold, who was restored into a cyborg equipped with an Anti-Geass device that he uses to dispel the effects of Sakuya's Geass on him. Furious with Sakuya for impersonating his brother and using him, he leaves the battlefield and storms Christoph's lab. Ash fights and defeats Christoph, who flees, and Sakuya apologizes to Ash for using him as he prepares himself to kill her.
9	"Reset"; Transliteration: "Enshin -Rīsetto-" (Japanese: 鉛心-Reset-)	Akie Ishii	Akie Ishii & Iwao Teraoka	Shuichi Shimamura	July 5, 2024	August 16, 2024
Ash decides to spare Sakuya and keep working with her to liberate Hokkaido, following a promise he made with her father. Christoph kills himself to prevent being put under her Geass and Norland sends Narah as an ambassador to initiate peace talks with the United Federation of Nations. 3 months later, large robotic units called Loki, invade countries around the world from the shore, killing all humans in sight and Narah realizes that it is a ploy by Norland. As the Black Knights are in disarray with the sudden attack, Rozé and Ash discover that their friends are also under attack by the same machines.
Final Act
10	"Purple Surf"; Transliteration: "Shiran -Pāpuru Sāfu-" (Japanese: 紫瀾-Purple Surf-)	Ai Sakamoto	Jōji Furuta & Yoshimitsu Ōhashi	Shuichi Shimamura	August 2, 2024	August 23, 2024
Norland seemingly disposes of Stanley, who developed the Loki. All armies around the world desperately fight the robots while Sakuya and Ash take the opportunity to invade the palace in order to rescue Sakura. Walther and Sakura escape from the Loki through an underground tunnel with help from Catherine, who decides to stay behind. Sakuya invades Norland's office and discovers that the Loki were his creation. Arnold appears and challenges Ash to a duel. While Ash kills Arnold, Sakuya confronts Norland, who reveals himself as a clone of her grandfather, the former Britannian emperor Charles zi Britannia, created to be a new vessel for his mind, which was prevented with Charles' death. Since then all his actions so far were in preparation for his true objective; the extermination of all humanity. Norland escapes by piloting his own Knightmare Frame, the Foulbout.
11	"Devastating Force"; Transliteration: "Kachikasane -Debasutētingu Fōsu-" (Japanese: 褐襲-Devastating Force-)	Akie Ishii	Akira Satō	Shuichi Shimamura	August 2, 2024	August 30, 2024
Ash boards Norland's floating fortress but Sakuya fails to catch up due to the Situmpe barrier covering Hokkaido like a dome, she goes to Neo Britannia's government building and with the help of the Seven Shining Stars deactivates the Barrier. Stanley, who is still alive, sends important data regarding the Loki to the Black Knights before dying, which reveals that they need to destroy the Foulbout in order to stop them, and Kaguya, as well as Sakura, unite the world against Norland. Catherine and Ash respectively fight Norland in their Knightmares but are easily overpowered due to Foulbout having been designed with the Situmpe system and are thrown overboard.
12	"Breaking Dawn"; Transliteration: "Asaake -Burēkingu Dōn-" (Japanese: 浅緋-Breaking Dawn-)	Yoshimitsu Ōhashi, Ai Sakamoto & Morihito Abe	Yoshimitsu Ōhashi	Shuichi Shimamura	August 2, 2024	September 6, 2024
Sakuya saves Ash from falling and encourages him to let her fight Norland with him, Ash in turn asks her to use her Geass on him again to make sure he won't give up. While initially struggling to find an opening, they eventually outmaneuver and mortally wound Norland, who activates Foulbout's self-destruct before dying, with Ash sacrificing himself so Sakuya's Knightmare has enough energy to return to the surface. 3 months after the battle, the world is safe and recovering from the ordeal, while Sakuya becomes empress and uses her Geass on herself to never use it again.

== Voice cast ==
Character	Japanese voice cast	English voice cast
Rozé	Kōhei Amasaki	Luca Padovan
Ash Phoenix	Makoto Furukawa; Makoto Koichi (young)	Cory Yee; Braylyx Rivera-Babbey (young)
Sakuya Sumeragi	Reina Ueda	Suzie Yeung
Sakura Haruyanaginomiya	Reina Ueda	Xanthe Huynh
Calis al Britannia	Kana Ichinose	Bryan Chao
Norland von Lunebelg	Hiroki Yasumoto	Dan Green
Catherine Sabathra	Nao Tōyama	Dani Chambers
Narah Vaughn	Yumi Uchiyama	Morla Gorrondona
Stanley Vonbraun	Daisuke Hirakawa	Dave B. Mitchell
Walther Lindstedt	Yasuyuki Kase	David Goldstein
Divock Merte	Masaaki Mizunaka	Neil Kaplan
Christoph Scissorman	Hiroyuki Yoshino	James Urbaniak
Heath Lott	Ryōta Ōsaka	River Vitae
Arnold Renck	Soma Saito	Griffin Puatu; Jack Hogan (young)
Greede Kirkwayne	Hirofumi Nojima	Aaron Phillips
Gran Kirkwayne	Yūki Ono	Alex Bankier
Nichol Phoenix	Manaka Iwami	Ryan Alexander Young
Ruby	Hina Yomiya	Lila Peldon
Sister	Mari Hino	Jennifer Sun Bell
Kensei Kuroto	Takaya Kuroda	Chris Okawa
Isao Munobe	Katsuyuki Konishi	Andrew Chan
Haruka Rutaka	Miyu Tomita	Kira Buckland
Tomōmi Oda	Shoya Chiba	Alan Lee
Shota Munemori	Taito Ban	Aleks Le
Yoko Araki	Riho Sugiyama	Dawn M. Bennett
Yuri Sano	Anzu Haruno	Risa Mei
Sarashino Tomi	Hayato Fujii	Jimmie Yamaguchi
Kaoru Shizuka	Chikahiro Kobayashi	Rick Kumazawa
Minato Sakai	Lynn	Jennifer Sun Bell
Jurō Sumeragi	Rikiya Koyama	Keone Young
Vallen Stark	Masashi Nogawa	Dave B Mitchell
Mei Ema	Haruka Shiraishi	Courtney Lin
Cornelia li Britannia	Junko Minagawa	Mary Elizabeth McGlynn
Nina Einstein	Saeko Chiba	Kim Mai Guest
L.L.	Jun Fukuyama	Johnny Yong Bosch
C.C.	Yukana	Kate Higgins
Suzaku Kururugi/Zero	Takahiro Sakurai	Yuri Lowenthal
Kallen Stadtfeld	Ami Koshimizu	Karen Strassman
Kaguya Sumeragi	Mika Kanai	Stephanie Sheh
Gino Weinberg	Sōichirō Hoshi	Dave Wittenberg
Akito Hyuga	Miyu Irino	Micah Solusod
Leila Malcal	Maaya Sakamoto	Jeannie Tirado
Ryo Sayama	Satoshi Hino	Ricco Fajardo
Ayano Kosaka	Yoko Hikasa	Elizabeth Maxwell
Yukiya Naruse	Yoshitsugu Matsuoka	Aaron Dismuke
Orpheus Zevon	Tatsuhisa Suzuki	Caleb Yen
Oldrin Zevon	Nana Hamasaki	Risa Mei
Sokkia Sherpa	Yū Watanabe	Courtney Lin

== Production ==
In December 2020, it was announced that a new anime project for Code Geass franchise was green-lit, with Yoshimitsu Ohashi directing the series at Sunrise, with Noboru Kimura providing the screenplay from an original story by co-creators Gorō Taniguchi and Ichirō Ōkouchi, Takahiro Kimura co-designing the characters with Shuichi Shimamura from original character concept by manga artist group CLAMP, and music composed by Kenji Kawai.

In December 2023, it was announced that it would be a four-part film project, and Kōhei Amasaki and Makoto Furukawa was cast as Rozé and Ash, respectively. In March and April 2024, more cast members were announced. The four-part film series' name was originally titled "Code Geass: Z of the Recapture" (コードギアス 奪還のゼット, Kōdo Giasu: Dakkan no Zetto), but was changed to "Code Geass: Rozé of the Recapture". Media reported that this was due to international circumstances, referring to Russia's invasion of Ukraine, which the Z symbol was associated with the Russian army.

The opening theme song is "Running in My Head" performed by Miyavi, while the ending theme song is "Rozé (prod. TeddyLoid)" performed by Hikari Mitsushima.

== Reception ==
=== Box office ===
The first film failed to reach top 10 in the Japanese box office in its first week. The second and third films debuted at number 7 in their opening weekends. The final film entered number 10 in its opening weekend.

=== Critical reception ===
Richard Eisenbeis of Anime News Network gave the first film an A− rating, and stated "Not only does it give us an excellent main character in Rozé (someone who feels both similar to and distinct from our previous protagonists), but also a true Code Geass story without undercutting what came before." For the second film, he gave a B+ rating, and stated "Outside of the big battle, the rest of this part of the anime spends time on intrigue rather than action." The third film received an A− rating, and stated "It hits the majority of its emotional beats well—especially those involving Ash and Sakuya—and the story is exciting with some truly excellent twists and turns." The final film received a B− rating, and stated "The pacing issues are just so egregious, especially here at the end, that they hinder not only the story but everything else as well[…]But when it comes down to it, this is what we're left with: an often enjoyable but regretfully flawed sequel to one of the 2000s' most seminal anime."

== Related media ==
=== Manga ===
A prequel manga series, Code Geass: Pure Almaria (コードギアス 新潔のアルマリア, Kōdo Giasu Shin Kiyoshi no Arumania), was published on Kadokawa's KadoComi digital platform on January 24, 2025. Written by Fumiya Nagatsuki and illustrated by Atsushi Soga, Pure Almaria takes place between the events of Lelouch of the Re;surrection and Rozé of the Recapture.
