= Lelouch Lamperouge =

Fictional character from Code Geass

Lelouch vi Britannia
- Code Geass character
- Lelouch wearing his Zero costume
- First appearance: "The Day a New Demon was Born" (2006)
- Created by: Ichirō Ōkouchi; Gorō Taniguchi; Clamp
- Voiced by: Japanese: Jun Fukuyama; Sayaka Ohara (young); English: Johnny Yong Bosch; Michelle Ruff (young)

Lelouch vi Britannia (Japanese: ルルーシュ・ヴィ・ブリタニア, Hepburn: Rurūshu vi Buritania), whose alias is Lelouch Lamperouge (ルルーシュ・ランペルージ, Rurūshu Ranperūji), is the main protagonist of the Sunrise anime series Code Geass: Lelouch of the Rebellion. In the series, Lelouch is a former prince from the superpower Britannia who is given the power of the "Geass" by a witch known as C.C. Using the Geass and his genius-level intellect, Lelouch becomes the leader of the resistance movement known as "The Black Knights" under his alter ego Zero (ゼロ) to destroy the Holy Britannian Empire, an imperial monarchy that has been conquering various countries under the control of his father.

Besides Code Geass, Lelouch has appeared in multiple related adaptations; in Nightmare of Nunnally, the protagonist has become a superpowered human combined with C.C.; in Akito the Exiled, he is a strategist brainwashed by his father as a supporting character; and in Code Geass: Lelouch of the Re;surrection (2019), he is leading his forces in an alternate sequel to the original television series. He is also present in video games based on the series as well as crossovers such as Super Robot Wars, which depict alternate scenarios for his role in the Code Geass series while still piloting his mecha, the Shinkirō.

Inspired by the tokusatsu series Kamen Rider, the director Gorō Taniguchi created Lelouch with the idea of having an evil protagonist who would appeal to the audience. Lelouch was designed by a group of manga artists called Clamp, who aimed to create a stylish and visually appealing character. Taniguchi handled the character alongside writer Ichirō Ōkouchi. Ōkouchi and Taniguchi agreed on the film Code Geass: Lelouch of the Re;surrection as his final appearance in the franchise. He is voiced by Jun Fukuyama, and his younger self is voiced by Sayaka Ohara. In the English dub, he is voiced by Johnny Yong Bosch, and his younger self is voiced by Michelle Ruff.

Lelouch has been recognized as one of Japan's most popular characters during the time Code Geass aired, appearing at the top of several polls. Publications for anime and manga saw Lelouch as an interesting character, and his character arc brings major depth, especially when being compared with his rival and friend Suzaku Kururugi. His voice actors, Fukuyama and Bosch, have been praised for their work as Lelouch's voice.

== Creation ==
Early designs of Lelouch and his alter ego, Zero (top right), by Clamp

The basic idea for the plot of Code Geass consisted of a "hero" who led a secret organization, which later developed into a conflict between two characters with different values and who belonged to the same military unit, who eventually became Lelouch and his best friend Suzaku Kururugi. According to writer Ichirō Ōkouchi, he did not want the story to revolve around Lelouch and Suzaku's points of view. Neither are they mouthpieces for his own personal ideologies. The prototype of Lelouch is Rokuro Makube, the antagonist in Osamu Tezuka's manga The Vampires. Director Gorō Taniguchi wanted Lelouch's actions in the television series to have a major impact on the cast, later resulting in the creation of the movie to explore it further. Writer Ichirō Ōkouchi says that while Lelouch is important to bring peace to the world at the cost of his life, Suzaku and several other characters have to remain alive to live up to his legacy. That end is to Lelouch and to Suzaku both the punishment and the salvation at the same time. Suzaku killing Lelouch was decided by the staff ever since the series began.

Despite similarities between Lelouch and Char Aznable from Mobile Suit Gundam, Taniguchi claimed he was more inspired by the TV series Kamen Rider in creating Lelouch and asked Ōkouchi to avoid Gundam-like characterizations. Just like Lelouch, the boss of Shocker begins by creating an evil organization, but by sheer bad luck, his childhood friend becomes Kamen Rider and comes to destroy him. Regardless of his strategies, he is always defeated by Kamen Rider. Nevertheless, the director ended up realizing that both Lelouch and Suzaku were too similar to Char and Gundam protagonist Amuro Ray, respectively, citing Lelouch's mask and Suzaku piloting a white mecha. Taniguchi found Lelouch and Suzaku's relationship was different from the Gundam leads, as in the case of their backstories, the two did not meet on the battlefield but instead in their childhood, similar to a holiday when Lelouch and Nunnally were taken to Suzaku's house.

=== Design ===
While designing the concept art for Lelouch, the series original character designers, Clamp, initially conceived of his hair color as being white. Nanase Ohkawa, head writer at Clamp, said she had visualized him as being a character to which everyone could relate as being "cool", literally, a "beauty". While developing the character during the initial planning stages, the series' core staff at Sunrise, director Gorō Taniguchi, Ōkouchi, and the production team discussed numerous possible influences for the character with Clamp, such as the Japanese idol duos KinKi Kids and Tackey & Tsubasa. When designing the character, Taniguchi asked Clamp to give him a strong aura. He originally did not want Lelouch to open up to his friends, which is why he shows a coldhearted personality when first seen, most notably when interacting with his high school friends. Taniguchi asked designers Takahiro Kimura, Yuriko Chiba, and Kazuya Murata for help when animating the character, most notably whenever Lelouch moves his hands and does poses while talking. In the making of the film trilogy, Taniguchi was asked to change events in the relationship Lelouch and C.C. have.

During the early planning stages for Lelouch's alter ego, "Zero", Clamp wanted to create a mask never witnessed prior in any Sunrise series. Zero was one of the earliest-developed characters. Ōkouchi wanted a mask to be included as a part of the series because he felt that a mask was necessary for it to be a Sunrise show. In the early designs of the character, Zero possessed long silver nails. Tanaguchi claimed that Lelouch's original view in the eyes of the fans changed from his anime persona to more like the manga one. The staff thus wanted Lelouch's characterization to be more realistic. In 2019, during the promotion of the upcoming movie, Taniguchi said that he wanted to leave Lelouch's death ambiguous, but later rescinded that statement by explaining that the TV series was not written with the idea of Lelouch being alive in mind. For the original video animation Code Geass: Akito the Exiled, director Kazuki Akane told the artists in charge to dress the imprisoned Lelouch and Suzaku in just their underwear so they would not be able to hide their weapons, but as it was too pathetic, he told the staff that they were going to have to wear only their underwear. Though Lelouch remains inactive in the finale, Akane wanted his last scenes with Suzaku to feel meaningful.

=== Resurrection ===
For the 10th anniversary of the series, Taniguchi decided it was necessary to do further development with Lelouch, which led to the newest film. While the staff believes the franchise will be expanded in the following years, they no longer plan to use Lelouch after the 2019 movie. Lelouch's resurrection gave the staff difficulties, especially because of his popularity. Since the end of the anime, the show staff has officially confirmed on multiple occasions that Lelouch is truly dead and not immortal because Lelouch paying for his sins through death was their sense of ethics. One such example was the "Geass Memories" anniversary Twitter event, where screenwriter and co-creator Ōkouchi said: "So his end can't be one that forgives him his sins. At least he is aware of his sins and pays for them with his death. This is mine and Taniguchi-director's sense of ethics in our works". Ōkouchi discussed the idea that while Lelouch is not a person who fights for justice, he would ally with other forces to rescue either Suzaku, C.C., or Nunnally.

Because, in the alternate universe of the movies, Lelouch is revived by C.C., his initial reunion results in him being beaten up by Suzaku, who feels that Lelouch is betraying him for not going along with the Zero Requiem, which was meant to kill him. Taniguchi claims that the Lelouch from the movie was more relaxed than in the TV series, as he was no longer filled with burdens. As the movie primarily centers around Lelouch's resurrection by C.C., Ōkouchi decided the most important subplot was his relationship with her and was not able to focus more on Suzaku or Nunnally due to it being less important. The trilogy of movies that retell the TV series were given new scenes to focus on the protagonist's relationship with C.C.

=== Casting ===
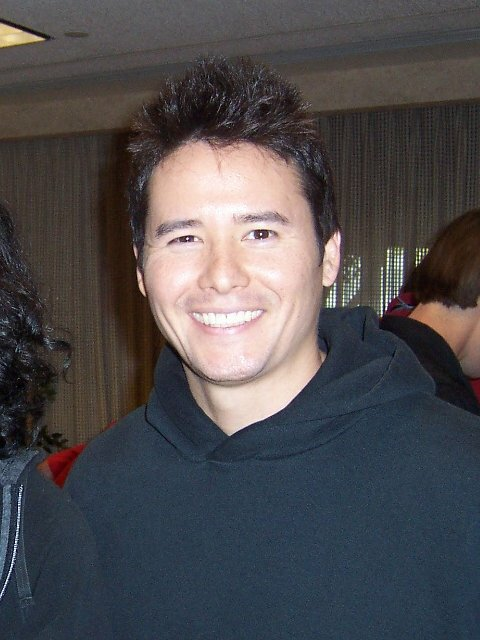
Johnny Yong Bosch voices Lelouch in English.

Japanese voice actor Jun Fukuyama said he had no problems voicing Lelouch for the Lelouch of the Resurrection film in contrast to the television series, finding his character simpler to understand as rather than end the war, Lelouch participated in the film solely to protect his sister. Fukuyama claimed that Lelouch was one of the most successful works of his entire career, to the point that many people called his work a masterpiece. As a result, following the ending of the television series, Fukuyama started receiving offers in regards to doing other anime series. He also remarks that he had fun working alongside Suzaku's actor, Takahiro Sakurai, whom he looked after due to his experience. Fukuyama regarded Suzaku's new persona as the new Zero as his own way of paying for his sins as he starts with the murder of his best friend. As a child, Lelouch is portrayed by Sayaka Ohara.

Johnny Yong Bosch voices the character in the English dub of the series. He expressed joy over how the original series ended. As a result, Bosch had mixed feelings in regards to voicing a dead character again during the film's early production. He thought it was just a rumor at first. He regarded him as not "exactly the same Lelouch" when comparing the television series and the movie. When explaining the movie, Bosch felt that Lelouch's return appeared to be understandable, but he was still "torn" by the decision to revive the protagonist. In the end, he accepted the idea of reusing the late character. He compared the idea of Lelouch's resurrection with Western movies' twists provided in their endings. He believed this could lead to more Code Geass series in the future. As a child, Lelouch is voiced by Michelle Ruff.

== Appearances ==
=== In Code Geass ===
==== Code Geass: Lelouch of the Rebellion ====
Lelouch is introduced in the first episode of the series as a student at Ashford Academy. His true identity is that of Lelouch vi Britannia, son of the Emperor of Britannia, Charles zi Britannia, and the late Imperial Consort Marianne. Following his mother's assassination, an event that also left his sister blind and crippled, his father banished him and his sister Nunnally to Japan, where they were used as political tools. It was during his stay at the Kururugi household that he first met Suzaku Kururugi, who would later become his best friend. He accidentally boards a truck used by Japanese resistance operatives. Within the truck is a capsule holding a witch known as C.C., who sacrifices herself to save him from the military forces trying to recapture her. When it seems as if her sacrifice was pointless, C.C. offers him the "Power of the King", the mythical power of Geass. The Geass manifests itself in him as the power of absolute obedience, which allows him to make people obey his orders without question. With his new power, Lelouch begins his rebellion against the Britannian Empire, starting by killing his half-brother, Clovis la Britannia, after extracting information about the murder of his mother. He takes up the identity of Zero and later forms the Order of the Black Knights, becoming a revolutionary and gaining popular support amongst the people.

The turning point in his rebellion comes when his half-sister, Euphemia li Britannia, declares the region under Mount Fuji the Special Administrative Zone of Japan, giving the Japanese people their name and country back. Lelouch confronts her at the opening ceremony. However, at this moment, his Geass permanently activates without him knowing, and an offhand comment about ordering her to kill the Japanese causes Euphemia to do just that. Lelouch reluctantly kills her and uses the massacre as an excuse to spark the Black Rebellion, in which he declares Japan to be an independent nation and leads an attack on the Tokyo Settlement. The attack goes well at first, but when Lelouch learns that Nunnally has been kidnapped, he abandons the battle, leaving his forces helpless against the better-organized Britannian military. Lelouch makes his way to Kamine Island to search for Nunnally, but is confronted by the revengeful Suzaku.

==== Code Geass: Lelouch of the Rebellion R2 ====
The second season of Code Geass takes place a year after the Black Rebellion, where Suzaku has the Emperor wiping out Lelouch's memories. Instead, Lelouch is living as an Ashford student, with Rolo Lamperouge who oversees the delusion under the guise of Lelouch's younger brother. Lelouch's memories are restored by C.C., and he resumes leadership of the Black Knights, gaining Rolo's trust in the process. When Nunnally is appointed as Governor of Area 11 and announces her plans to reestablish the Special Administrative Zone of Japan, Lelouch engineers the legal exile of the Black Knights by getting the Britannians to agree to exile Zero in exchange for bringing one million participants to Nunnally's new Japan. The Black Knights escape to the Chinese Federation, where Lelouch begins forging an alliance with the other world powers to create a force that rivals Britannia. He starts by destabilizing the Chinese Federation, returning control to Empress Tianzi from the High Eunuchs. Once Lelouch's new alliance, the United Federation of Nations, is formed, their first act is to liberate Japan. Despite Lelouch's desire to protect his sister, Lelouch believes his sister passes away when his Geass forces Suzaku to nuke a large area. Schneizel then convinces the Black Knights to betray him, with a despondent Lelouch willing to be killed by his former comrades, until Rolo sacrifices his life to save him. Upon learning his mother has been aiding the Emperor in their goal to wipe out individuality from the world, Lelouch uses his Geass to erase them from reality. One month later, Lelouch usurps the Britannian throne and appoints Suzaku as his knight to set the stage for their ultimate plan, the Zero Requiem. This brings him into conflict with Schneizel, who has Nunnally in his custody and commands the Damocles (a floating fortress that he intends to place into a position that would allow him to fire nuclear weapons worldwide), and the Black Knights. In the final battle, Lelouch has Schneizel and the Damocles both under his control, declaring himself the ruler of the world. Two months later, the Zero Requiem's final phase takes place, with Lelouch being killed by Suzaku in the guise of Zero. In his last moments, Lelouch talks with Nunnally who succeeds her brother as Empress, and makes a new era of peace.

==== Code Geass: Akito the Exiled ====
Taking place between the first two seasons of Lelouch of the Rebellion, Lelouch appears in the Akito the Exiled original video animation under the alias Julius Kingsley (ジュリアス・キングスレイ, Juriasu Kingusurei) after being brainwashed by his father Charles. Escorted by Suzaku, Lelouch becomes the empire's military adviser. Lelouch makes a few appearances in the miniseries, first seen in Suzaku's custody as he clutches his right eye while begging his friend for water. Upon arriving in St. Petersburg, Kingsley proudly declares that the Emperor has placed him in charge of all the Eastern front operational planning for Britannia's military. Kingsley encounters Shin Hyuga Shaing and others for a meeting. Kingsley showcases a clip to create fear and havoc within the city. Later on, he plays chess along with Hyuga but starts hallucinating memories from the first Code Geass season. Later on, Hyuga figures out that he is both Zero and Lelouch and calls his squad. Suzaku, in an attempt to defend the secret, kills most of the squad. Eventually, both are captured, with Hyuga later declaring Kingsley executed and revealing that he is Zero. From here, Kingsley begins to regain his memories in a traumatized fashion, prompting Suzaku to strangle him, until Lelouch begins to cry and begs Suzaku to kill him. However, they are saved by Rolo.

==== Code Geass: Lelouch of the Re;surrection ====
In the events of the 2019 film Code Geass: Lelouch of the Re;surrection, which takes place a year after the events of the recap movies, which form a non-canon alternate universe, Lelouch's corpse is revealed to have been smuggled away by Shirley and resurrected from the dead by C.C. C.C. manages to finally fully resurrect Lelouch when she helps Kallen, among others, free Suzaku. Lelouch contacts the wounded Suzaku, beats him up when C.C. claims that she is the one who wants the resurrection. After he and Nunnally were kidnapped by the Zilkhistans, who needed the latter to restore their country to its former glory, Lelouch momentarily resumes his identity as Zero to rescue Nunnally alongside the remnants of the Black Knights and the Britannian forces. Lelouch uses his tactical prowess to deduce the mechanics of Shamna's Geass and knocks her out. He frees Nunnally and rescues her mind from C's World with C.C. Despite being offered the position of living with his sister again, Lelouch leaves her and bequeaths his alter ego to Suzaku. He then approaches the leaving C.C. and convinces her to let him join her journey under the alias "L.L.", which, according to director Taniguchi, is Lelouch's idea of a marriage proposal. In the post-credit scene, Lelouch and C.C. confront a pirate whose Geass was taken by the witch.

==== Code Geass: Roze of the Recapture ====
Taking place in the alternate continuity of Re;surrection, the Code Geass: Rozé of the Recapture films start with how Lelouch's death initially led to world peace, but then the world eventually descends into chaos due to the nation of Neo Britannia. Taking place seven years after wandering with C.C, Lelouch comes across Sakuya Sumeragi, the current princess of Japan, and gifts her a Geass power similar to his for her rebellion, though he warns her that her Geass could condemn her to solitude just like his fate before.

=== Other media ===
Lelouch's Knightmare, the Shinkirō

In Code Geass: Lost Colors, the visual novel for the PlayStation 2 and PlayStation Portable, there are several different endings and clips of Lelouch that involve the main character, Rai, who joins the same school. Across the game, the player can make Rai befriend Lelouch. Rai can also become Lelouch's best friend as well as Zero's partner. In the video game Another Century's Episode: R, Lelouch makes an appearance in his Knightmare Frame, the Shinkirō. He also appears in the spin-off with the Shinkirō. Lelouch and the rest of the Code Geass cast also appear in the Super Robot Wars franchise in the game Super Robot Wars DD.

The Code Geass manga follows the same basic plot as the anime, but with several differences. He takes on the identity of Zero but largely focuses on his activities with the Black Knights. Nightmare of Nunnally features Lelouch's transformation into Zero by merging with C.C. This time, the Geass grants Lelouch supernatural strength, allowing him to battle the Knightmares in hand-to-hand combat. After several fights against Britannia, Zero orders the Black Knights to side with the army to defeat the Emperor, as Euphemia is due to take over the empire. Once the Emperor is defeated, Zero's death is announced, as Lelouch inherits C.C.'s name and immortality, becoming C.C. and the Demon King, and goes forth to spread Geass and promote conflict around the world.

In the manga Suzaku of the Counterattack, Lelouch obtains his Geass in the same way as in the anime series, except that his Geass symbol is slightly rendered. Many of the Black Knights are not loyal to Zero and often split off into renegade factions or act without his knowledge. Lelouch is held responsible for a terrorist attack when a Black Knights faction went renegade without following his instructions. He later goes to kill his father only to discover that he was already killed by Schneizel, his half-brother; however, it is later revealed to be Schneizel's scheme to get Lelouch executed and to take C.C.'s Code. Near the end of the manga, Lelouch tries to use his Geass on Schneizel, but the latter punctures his left eye, leaving him never to use his Geass again.

In Tales of an Alternate Shogunate, set in 1853 at the Bakumatsu Era, Lelouch is the commander of the military counterinsurgency brigade known as the Shinsengumi, formed under the orders of the Shogunate to fight the rebel group known as the Black Revolutionaries, but was secretly the leader of that group as Zero and has gained information from within. The event is set in Kyoto, and Lelouch had recently acquired his Geass from C.C. and had stolen Britannia's new Knightmare, Gawain.

In a special Code Geass Picture Drama episode, Lelouch appears on December 5 for Ashford Academy's school festival, helping Rivalz, now school president, along with some of his friends. However, a battle erupts on school grounds by the Neo-Chinese Federation, led by a former eunuch, who takes everyone hostage. With the help of his friends, Lelouch manages to stop the Federation soldiers. In the aftermath, the entire episode is revealed to be a dream, for which the ghost of Lelouch used to thank everyone. In a special OVA parody episode based on the Alice in Wonderland story, Lelouch is narrating the story and appears in the role of the Mad Hatter.

== Reception ==
=== Popularity ===
Lelouch's character has been well received by viewers of the series, appearing in various anime polls. Lelouch was voted the most popular male character of 2006, 2007, and 2008 in Animage magazine's annual Anime Grand Prix, and Newtype magazine named him the best anime male character of the decade. In 2008, Lelouch was nominated as one of the best male characters by the Society for the Promotion of Japanese Animation (SPJA) at the SPJA Industry Awards. In 2014, NTT customers voted him as their 13th favorite black-haired male anime character. His voice actor, Jun Fukuyama, also won the "Best Actor in a Leading Role" award for his portrayal of the character at the first Seiyu Awards in 2007. Fukuyama's work as Lelouch's voice actor also led him to win the Tokyo International Anime Fair in the category "Best Voice Actor".

In June 2020, Tokyo gubernatorial candidate Teruki Gotō cosplayed as Lelouch during his election campaign. On a poster, he said, "I, Teruki Gotō, command you: Vote for me." in the same manner as the character. Sunrise stated they were not related to Gotō, who removed his poster and apologized in response.

=== Critics ===
Critics of the anime and manga series have also commented on Lelouch's character. Anime News Network's Carl Kimlinger stated that Lelouch "is hard to like" because of his narcissistic personality, but noted that his bonds with Nunnally and his friends make up for that. Bamboo Dong from the site agreed with Kimlinger, though she noted that Lelouch made the series interesting to watch. A mostly positive response was given by Danielle Van Gorder from Mania Entertainment due to Lelouch's differences from most anime protagonists and how his double life as 'Zero' and as a student is shown across the series. IGN compared Lelouch with Light Yagami from the Death Note series due to his double life and his questionable methods, respectively. The double-life aspect has also been praised due to how such a change also differentiates the show's tone from a high school comedy to an action show and how he "winds up" between his two selves. Moreover, his reasons for evil actions have also been found to help viewers like the character. Also from IGN, Ramsey Isler found Lelouch's double life trait to be rather comical, as after the short prologue of his role as Zero in an episode, he is seen doing homework at school for being absent from classes. Johnny Yong Bosch's work was also the subject of praise.

The book Language Arts in Asia 2: English and Chinese Through Literature, Drama and Popular Culture claims that the staff behind the anime took a bold approach to titling the series' first episode "The Day a New Demon was Born", as its first scene follows Lelouch as a child who wants to destroy the Empire of Britannia, and when using the power of the Geass as a teenager, he uses this to protect himself by ordering all Britannian soldiers to kill each other. Like IGN, the book noted that the ambiguous nature behind Lelouch's actions is comparable to Light's in Death Note, and anime fans often compare him with the rest of the protagonists. Otakuzine regarded him as one of the most intelligent anime characters due to his achievements on the battlefield, which the magazine compared with his skills at chess.

Kevin Leathers from UK Anime Network enjoyed Lelouch's personality, as his cold persona made the series "refreshing" from other mecha anime. Lelouch is ranked 23rd on IGN's 2009 list of the best anime characters of all time and 18th on IGN's 2014 list. Gia Manry from the same site listed Suzaku and him as the third-best "frenemies" in anime due to how their friendship falls apart as a result of their rivalry. The rivalry was praised by Nicole Soto Rodríguez due to how dangerous the methods employed by Suzaku and Lelouch are and how both come across as hypocrites when defending each other as the narrative explores philosophies involving them. Ultimately, both Suzaku and Lelouch become like each other as they fail to live up to their own values and only find the objective they want when joining forces. The Fandom Post noted that Suzaku and Lelouch's relationship might attract female viewers, so he recommended an anthology manga to them, praising the multiple designs presented commonly seen in the yaoi genre. Chris Beveridge from the same site praised Lelouch's actions in R2 when he becomes Britannia's Emperor, describing him as "the classic angle of the villain with good motives" because of the dangerous actions he takes for the greater good. Beveridge also commented on his confrontations with Schneizel and Nunnally, mentioning the rivalry across the series in the former and citing the latter as heartbreaking. Meanwhile, Kotaku enjoyed both Lelouch's and Suzaku's traits due to how both of them consider themselves evil, resulting in the series achieving an appealing ending due to how the duo orchestrated Lelouch's death in order to bring peace to the chaos they create in the finale.

In regards to Lelouch's return in the film Lelouch of the Re;surrection, Anime News Network noted that while the film centers around the multiple consequences of Lelouch's actions across the television series in regards to the returning cast, he was not the main character, as instead, the narrative focused more on C.C. Nevertheless, the writer noted that one of the biggest mysteries behind the film that people wondered was if Lelouch revived something that might have ruined the television series' ending. The Fandom Post commented that when reviving, with it being the thing he was looking forward to the most, Lelouch retains his old traits, such as his love interests and his bond with Suzaku. However, he still found his ending with C.C. too abrupt, despite feeling appropriate at the same time. Despite finding the emotional reunions Lelouch has flat, UK Anime News still praised Lelouch teaming up with C.C. to defeat the villains as well as the focus of detail on their engagement in the last scene. On the other hand, Kotaku criticized his role in the OVA Akito the Exiled due to his lack of relevance.
