= Suzaku Kururugi =

Fictional character from Code Geass

- Code Geass character
- Suzaku Kururugi in Code Geass
- First appearance: Season 1, Episode 1
- Voiced by: Takahiro Sakurai (Japanese); Yuri Lowenthal (English); Akeno Watanabe (Japanese, young); Laura Bailey (English, young)

In-universe information
- Nickname: RandomOverHeaven
- Relatives: Genbu Kururugi (father, deceased); Kaguya Sumeragi (cousin)
- Nationality: Japanese
- Allegiance: Britannian Military; Knights of the Round; World Liberation Ark Fleet; Euro Britannia
- Rank: Private; Warrant Officer; Major; Knight of Seven; Knight of Zero
- Knightmare Frame: Lancelot

Suzaku Kururugi (Japanese: 枢木スザク, Hepburn: Kururugi Suzaku) is a fictional character in the anime series Code Geass: Lelouch of the Rebellion produced by Sunrise, Inc. In the original Japanese dubbing, he is voiced by Takahiro Sakurai, and his younger self is voiced by Akeno Watanabe. Suzaku Kururugi, born on July 10, 2000, a.t.b., is the son of Japan's last prime minister, Genbu Kururugi. His existence was kept secret from the public until after the war. Suzaku met Lelouch vi Britannia and his sister Nunnally vi Britannia when they moved to the Kururugi residence as a diplomatic peace trade. Initially, Suzaku thought Lelouch was a selfish prince and despised him. However, as time passed, he came to know Lelouch better, and they soon became best friends. They were separated when Britannia invaded Japan but were reunited in the Shinjuku Ghetto.

When Britannia began its invasion of Japan, Suzaku was mortified by the violence and his father's belief that resisting to the bitter end was preferable to surrendering. Unable to change his father's mind, Suzaku murdered him during a heated exchange. The incident was covered up, and Suzaku's life was spared, while the government was thrown into disarray and surrendered to Britannia. Lelouch believes that, had Genbu lived, Japan likely would have been torn apart by war once the other major powers decided to intervene. His guilt over the incident causes Suzaku to constantly place himself on the front lines in the hope of atoning for his actions with his death. It also inspires his belief that the ends achieved with immoral means are meaningless since he created peace through murder. However, after firing the F.L.E.I.J.A. warhead, under the command of Lelouch's Geass, he abandons this belief and decides to achieve his goals regardless of the means. This causes him to finally join Lelouch.

== Appearances ==
=== In Code Geass: Lelouch of the Rebellion ===
Suzaku's Knightmare Frame, the Lancelot

Suzaku is introduced in the series' first episode as an Honorary Britannian soldier. While searching the Shinjuku ghetto for poison gas stolen by resistance members, he finds Lelouch standing next to it. He refuses to carry out an order to kill Lelouch and is shot by his superior officer for his insubordination. However, the bullet is stopped by a broken pocket watch belonging to his deceased father. Suzaku is approached by Lloyd Asplund and offered a chance to pilot the experimental Knightmare Frame Lancelot (ランスロット, Ransurotto). The Lancelot's advanced systems, combined with his unprecedented piloting skills, allow him to almost single-handedly dismantle Lelouch's plan to rout the massacre of the Shinjuku ghetto, but he finds himself under arrest afterward for the murder of Prince Clovis; Lelouch rescues Suzaku from his impending execution by assuming the identity of Zero and takes credit for Clovis' murder, forcing the military to acquit Suzaku, but Suzaku refuses to join his cause. He agrees that the Britannian Empire is corrupt and not worth serving, but wants to change and improve the Empire from within, to show that his father's death was not in vain.

Suzaku remains the pilot of the Lancelot. He is reunited with Lelouch and Nunnally after enrolling in Ashford Academy at Euphemia's suggestion. He is promoted to Warrant Officer by Cornelia li Britannia when she first arrives in Japan, and is appointed Euphemia's personal Knight, gaining the rank of Major, after a televised battle with the Black Knights. During the battle on Shikine Island, in which Suzaku is ordered to kill Zero, Lelouch uses the power of Geass on Suzaku to escape destruction, and commands him to "live," forcing him to survive by any means from then on. Suzaku falls in love with Euphemia, and is emotionally crushed by her death at Zero's hands. He is visited by V.V., who explains Zero's power of Geass, which drives him to find and kill Zero. He follows Lelouch to Kamine and confirms his identity, after trying to convince himself that Zero and Lelouch were not the same person. Lelouch offers Suzaku a truce to rescue Nunnally, but Suzaku insists that Lelouch's very existence should be ended. Lelouch draws his pistol, and both men attempt to shoot one another.

In the second season, Suzaku receives a promotion into the Knights of the Round, the most powerful order of warriors in the Britannian Empire, as a reward for capturing Zero. He intends to become the Knight of One, which will allow him to rule Area 11 by his choosing. Suzaku and the other Knights of the Round watch as Zero announces that he will continue his plans to create the United States of Japan. Suzaku returns to Area 11 as a student in Ashford Academy to discover if Lelouch has regained his memories of being Zero. After the creation of the United Federation of Nations is cut short by the Emperor's appearance, Suzaku is contacted by a desperate Lelouch, who asks him to protect Nunnally from the Emperor. Suzaku agrees to his request, but only if Lelouch meets him alone at the Kururugi shrine. The meeting goes well at first, and Suzaku decides to help him if Lelouch ends his war, but Schneizel's unexpected attempt to arrest Lelouch makes him believe Suzaku went back on his word. During the second battle of Tokyo, Suzaku is attacked by Guilford under the influence of Lelouch's Geass and Jeremiah Gottwald, whom Lelouch convinced to join the Black Knights. Though both are drawn away from Suzaku, he is forced to battle Kallen in her improved Guren. Suzaku's Geass command forces him to use the F.L.E.I.J.A. bomb, hitting the government complex, wiping out the entire government building and most of the surrounding area.

Realizing that he has been naïve, Suzaku takes a more active approach to becoming Knight of One, offering to kill the Emperor for Schneizel. He enters the Sword of Akasha with C.C. and agrees with Lelouch that the wishes of Charles and Marianne are selfish, even stopping Marianne from approaching Lelouch. One month later, he assists Lelouch in taking the throne, becoming his "Knight of Zero." When the surviving Knights of the Round attempt to remove Lelouch from power, Suzaku easily defeats them with his new Lancelot Albion (ランスロット アルビオン, Ransurotto Arubion). He also assists in taking the U.F.N. leaders hostage. During the battle against Schneizel and the Black Knights, he joins Lelouch in boarding the Damocles. Kallen manages to land a fatal blow on the Lancelot while his last attack disables her Knightmare. Suzaku is believed to have died in the blast, but he reappears before the world as the new Zero to kill Lelouch, now the despised tyrannical Emperor of the world, as part of their plan for world peace. Afterwards, Suzaku becomes Nunnally's protector.

=== Akito The Exiled ===
Suzaku makes his debut in Episode 2 of the original video animation. Suzaku is a Knight of Round in this OVA. He is seen accompanying Julius Kingsley, arriving at St. Petersburg. Julius and Suzaku were granted authority to take command of Euro Britannia thanks to the Imperial Scepter granted by the Emperor. Suzaku continues to show hostility towards Julius Kingsley. Later, Julius launched his campaign, "World Liberation Ark Fleet," as a ruse to cause chaos amongst the E.U. This causes a feud between the higher-ups of the E.U. regarding innocents, and as a result, the Archduke of Verance was arrested thanks to Shin's support. While Julius and Shin were playing chess, Suzaku stood by until Julius started to break down. Shin later confirms that Julius is a terrorist Zero and that Suzaku is the greatest proof. Suzaku pointed a gun at him by refuting the fact that Zero was executed by the Emperor. Still, regardless, Shin started to deduce what happened back in the attack on Japan before becoming Area 11 by comparing it to when they both killed their parents. The Knights of St Michael attacked to protect Shin but were completely outmatched against Lancelot. His ruthless and devastating defeat of the knights gained him the title "White Reaper." While Suzaku is fighting Jean, Shin asks Suzaku what it takes to change the world. After sparing both Jean and Julius, they are imprisoned in OVA 4 with Lancelot imprisoned, and during that time, Lelouch begins talking to Suzaku by hallucinating his memories. In the final OVA, Suzaku tries to avenge Euphemia by choking Lelouch to death. Lelouch begs him to kill him as Suzaku sees a tear from his eye, but then he releases him. Suzaku and Lelouch are later released by Rolo, who tells them that the emperor wishes an audience with Lelouch.

=== Code Geass: Lelouch of the Re;surrection ===
In the events of the 2019 film Code Geass: Lelouch of the Re;surrection, which takes place a year after the events of the alternate universe trilogy movies, Suzaku is escorting Nunnally when they are captured by the Zilkhistans. Suzaku was imprisoned before being freed and reunited with Lelouch, who was resurrected from the dead by C.C. and who briefly resumes his cover as Zero long enough to save his sister and bequeaths the title back to Suzaku.

== Appearances in other media ==
=== Lost Colors ===
In the video game spin-off Code Geass: Lost Colors, if the player uses Rai's geass on Suzaku to make him join the Black Knights, Suzaku joins and brutally fights off the Britannian forces. He also participates in the Black Rebellion, which has the Black Knights winning the war. The player may choose to pursue Suzaku as a friend by joining the Britannian military. In the All Hail Britannia route, Rai becomes Suzaku's partner in battle and receives a Knightmare Frame of his own similar to the Lancelot. He may use his own Geass to stop Euphemia from ordering the infamous massacre portrayed in episodes 22-23 under Lelouch's accidental Geass. After ordering the Princess to stop and then ordering the crowd to forget her order, Euphemia's plan to create the Special Zone of Japan succeeds. Rai and Suzaku are then known as the new country's two White Knights. In the Black Knights path, Suzaku can stop Euphemia from Lelouch's control.

=== Nightmare of Nunnally ===
In the manga spin-off series, Suzaku first appeared in chapter 7 of the manga series and has received approval from Schneizel for Euphemia to have Suzaku as her knight. When Suzaku first fought against Lelouch as Zero in his Lancelot Knightmare Frame, Lelouch noticed that his powers were negated, hinting that Suzaku might have another ability. In Chapter 13, it is revealed that in this timeline, Suzaku did not kill his father; C.C. did to protect Lelouch and Nunnally. Later, Suzaku is revealed to be a being known as a 'Wired,' a being who can access the power of Eden Vital without entering into a Geass Contract and thus having the qualifications to become a 'Demon King' like Zero, but was shocked when the identity of Zero was revealed to be Lelouch.

After the Mark Nemo pilot was captured, Suzaku was approached by Lelouch, who was shocked when he revealed the pilot was Nunnally and had no choice but to help him, and later passed the information to Euphemia. Suzaku, along with Lelouch as Zero, arrived on time to stop Nunnally from being executed by her other brother, Rolo Vi Britannia, on Euphemia's orders, and proceeded to fight Rolo and his knight, Anya Alstreim, only to be defeated by Anya's Tristan Knightmare Frame. After Alice flees with Nunnally and Emperor Charles Zi Britannia declares the Holy Nation of Eden Vital, Suzaku is arrested along with Euphemia, Cornelia, as well as his comrades Guilford, Lloyd, and Cecile. He is rescued by Zero and, despite his mistrust, helps him make Euphemia the Empress of Britannia. Having lost his original Lancelot, Suzaku deploys the Lancelot Albion with Zero in his Gawain against the Emperor's Knights of Rounds (who are revealed to be undead zombies). Suzaku and his Albion are almost defeated, but are saved by Charles' defeat. At the end of the series, Suzaku remains as Euphemia's knight, and the two of them meet Lelouch for the last time when he appears to them in Euphemia's office to bid farewell.

=== Suzaku of the Counterattack ===
In the manga spin-off series, Suzaku is shown as the main protagonist, wearing a bionic combat suit and going by the alias Lancelot. After a renegade Black Knights faction attacked the Lubie automobile, which killed Lenard and injured Mariel when the wrecked car was destroyed, Suzaku is fueled by anger as he seeks to defeat Zero. It is revealed that he had killed his father Genbu, but it was done when Suzaku found out that he and the Emperor of Japan were willing to collaborate with Britannia and kill off anti-occupation Japanese officials and civilians. In a fit of anger, he stabs Genbu in the chest.

When Suzaku joins Schneizel's cause, he is moved by his words that he wished to create a world where everyone is equal, and offers Suzaku a position as his knight. When an art gallery, with Emperor Charles in control, was taken over by the Black Knight, Suzaku was sent by Schneizel to try to prevent any civilian casualties. When he arrived, he saw not only the Emperor dead but saw Schneizel being shot by Zero, causing him to shoot shot his gun at his mask, which cracked and was shocked to see that it was Lelouch as Zero. Schneizel praises Suzaku for his efforts, but mentions the event that happened seven years ago, which he shouldn't have known about. Suzaku is torn over the decision to execute Lelouch, since it will take Nunnally's brother from her.

Later Suzaku discovers C.C., who reveals that it was Schneizel, not Lelouch, who killed the Emperor. He plans to take C.C.'s immortality. Realizing that he has been serving the wrong man, Suzaku frees Lelouch to help confront Schneizel. Suzaku and Lelouch infiltrate the Government building and confront Schneizel, who has already absorbed some of C.C.'s powers, allowing him to easily dispatch them. With Schneizel about to fully gain C.C.'s powers and her immortality, Suzaku reveals himself as a Regulator, negating Schneizel's ability and then kills him with his sword. With Schneizel now dead, C.C.'s powers are instead transferred to Suzaku, now possessing all of her abilities and her immortality. With Suzaku and Lelouch preparing to leave with C.C., Jeremiah arrived and shot Lelouch before the floor collapsed and he fell to his death. Suzaku managed to save Lelouch and escape with C.C. before the entire Government building collapsed, with the fate of Lloyd surviving is unknown. Five years later with the Black Knights supposed victory, an immortal Suzaku to meet his friend.

=== Code Geass (manga) ===
Suzaku is present in the manga adaptation with many differences. He was already a student at Ashford Academy from the start. He was not present with Lelouch when C.C. was revealed to be in the capsule. Finally, he met Euphemia while at the Academy and not on the streets. He still believes that he can change the system from within.

=== The Miraculous Birthday ===
In a special Code Geass Picture Drama episode, Suzaku arrived at Ashford Academy with Nunnally, Shirley, and Nina, and had met with Lelouch, but also brought C.C. with him and commented if she's Lelouch's girlfriend, to which she replied that he proposed to her, and suggested a wedding being held at the Kururugi Shrine for them. However, a battle erupted in school grounds by the Neo-Chinese Federation and took everyone hostage. In the aftermath, Suzaku watches Lelouch's body disappearing and was thanked by him before giving him an inspirational speech. When the group realized Rolo, Shirley, and C.C. were gone, Suzaku realized the date being December 5 being Lelouch's birthday. Suzaku once again donned his Zero persona and commented that he still will not say thanks to Lelouch because of everything that has happened, but still says Happy Birthday to him in respect.

=== Another Century ===
The fourth installment of the Another Century's Episode series, Another Century's Episode R features Suzaku with his Lancelot. After the defeat in the Chinese Federation, Suzaku arrives with Rounds and a fleet of Britannian Knightmare Frames led by Schneizel. As they are about to fight the Black Knights an unknown black energy appeared and was suddenly transported to Eria, where he is separated with the other Britannian forces and the other Rounds, but manage to board the Avalon with Lloyed and Ceclie, who were also sucked in. In Eria, Suzaku and have appeared on a mountain landscape, were Cecil discovered Zero near their area. Kei and Olson D. Verne from Super Dimension Century Orguss, and Kei ask whether he would join them, which Suzaku refuse because of their alliance with Zero and prepares to attack, but was interrupted by one of the Seasons, Spring One, in her Core unit, Sea Plant, with a group of Icon units. When Spring offered them allegiance, Suzaku hesitated because he will not forgive Zero, but will not trust anyone that would protect Zero, and he refuses. After Spring ordered the attack, Suzaku ordered the Avalon to assist Zero and his new allies. After her defeat and the appearance of more Icons, he and the others witness Macross Quarter from the Macross Zero series, with the Ark Alpha, and witness it destroying a fleet of Icon. As the Macross Quarter captain, Jeffrey Wilder, offered the group to join up with them, Zero agreed and asked Suzaku to come with them, which he hesitated but accepts.

Later in their first mission together with Zero and the others, Suzaku and the others fought against Spring One in her Core unit, Sea Stand, which Autumn later delivered the final blow in her Core unit, Alpharto, causing Spring to escape. When Zero question if she is really human, Suzaku was surprised when Autumn revealed she isn't but an android. Suzaku, along with Alto Saotome and other mechs from the Macross Frontier, followed Brera Sterne, who had also sided with Seasons along with Grace O'Conner, to a ruined city, where he was shocked that Gino and Anya, along with some Britannian forces had sided with the Season. and tried to convince them to stop, which Gino replied if he enjoyed being a Black Knight and tells him to come to their side, leaving Suzaku in doubt. However, Zero manage to convince him that the battle is not about Britannia or Japan but their worlds, leading Suzaku to reject Gino's offer and fight alongside Zero and defeating both Gino and Anya.

As the plot progresses, The group later encountered a group of Gareth Knightmare Frames, along with the Knight of Ten, Luciano Bradley, and surprisingly Li Xingke, who have sided with Seasons. With Xingke beginning the assault, Suzaku, along with Zero, C.C. and Kallen, have fought and defeated him, but when Xingke was about to be killed by Bradley, Suzaku had blocked his attack and saved him, leading Xingke to switch sides and defeating Luciano, leading him to his death.

Suzaku and Co then confronts the other four Season's in their Core units and later Dr. Shiki, in Winter's body, piloting the ACE Core. After his defeat and Autumn using all of her powers to prevent the hole to expand, Suzaku returns to his own world along with Zero, Kallen, and others. Suzaku was then requested by Zero that the two discuss, and later went their separate ways, knowing they'll be enemies again. Suzaku appears in the sequel with his Lancelot Albion. Suzaku and the rest of the Code Geass R1 cast make their debut to the Super Robot Wars franchise in this game, using their R1 Knightmares.

=== Nunnally in Wonderland ===
In a special OVA parody episode, based on the Alice in Wonderland story, Suzaku appears in the role as the White Knight.

== Creation ==
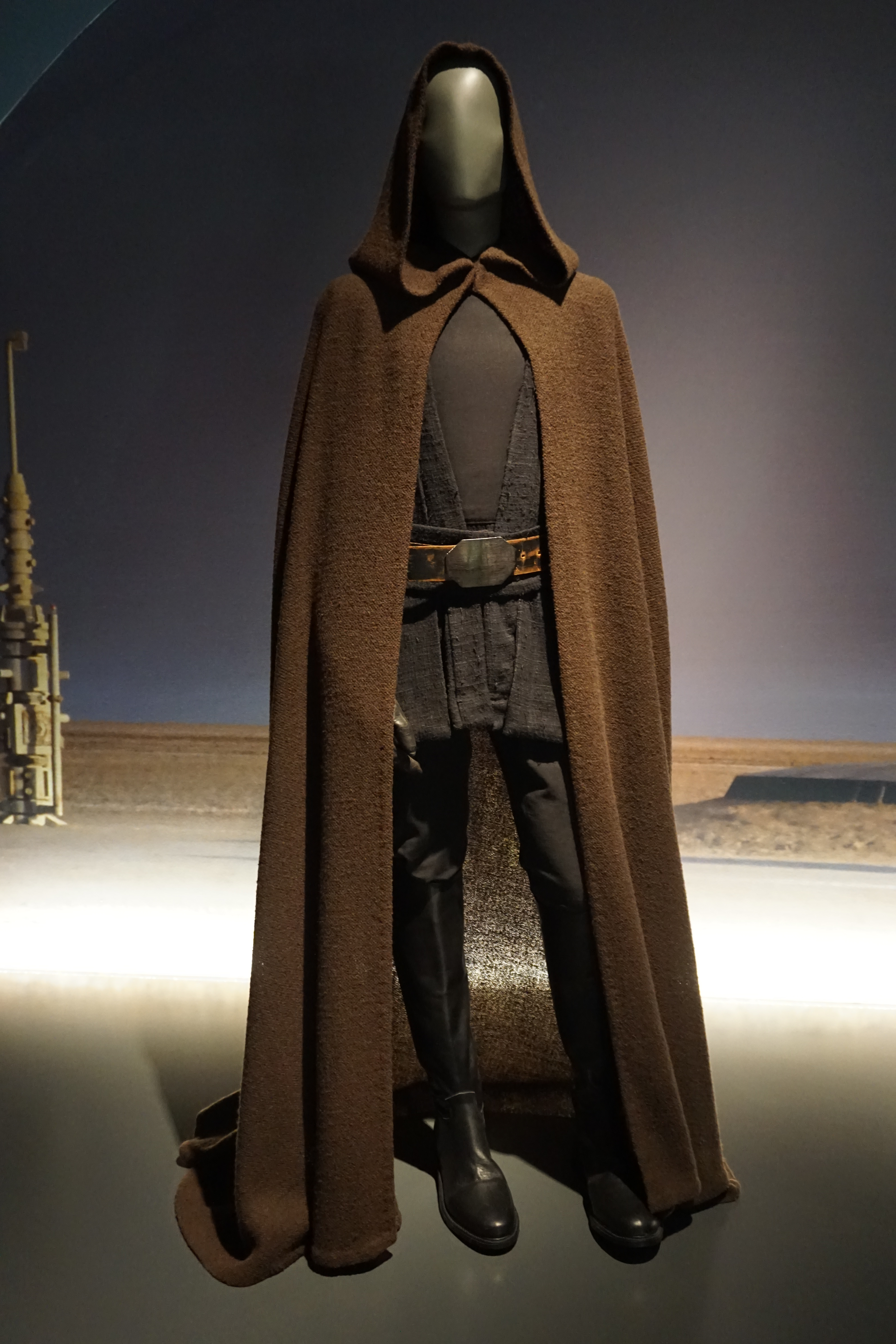
Luke Skywalker's Jedi robes from Episode VI influenced Suzaku's portrayal in the second half of Code Geass.

The basic idea for the plot of Code Geass consisted of a "hero" who led a secret organization, which was later developed into a conflict between two characters with different values and who belonged to the same military unit, who eventually became Lelouch Lamperouge and Suzaku Kururugi. According to writer Ichiro Okouchi, Suzaku is a character that can stand on his own, but they personally had no wish to make this story revolve around Lelouch and Suzaku's points of view. Neither are they mouthpieces for my own personal ideologies. While finding Suzaku important, the staff believed there also several more characters meant to be explored. While the main cast involved Brittania characters, Suzaku is an Eleven, so although even in a happy school, there would be heavy parts, Okouchi thinks that a Director Goro Taniguchi series would have that nuance.

The character of Suzaku was mainly inspired by Star Wars character Luke Skywalker whose development is reflected in their clothing; Both Suzaku and Luke start appearing in the anime as innocent and noble with his with white clothing and mecha, and later installment they become darker with black clothing. Nevertheless, both Suzaku and Luke find redemption in their respective stories. Suzaku's rivalry with Lelouch was inspired by Kamen Rider as such series explore the theme of evil being used to defeat evil. However, Taniguchi agrees they ended looking similar to the protagonists from Mobile Suit Gundam, Amuro Ray and Char Aznable. Similarly, Okouchi noticed several similarities with the Mobile Suit Zeta Gundam character Kamille Bidan with Lelouch coming more like across Char's fake persona, Quatto Bajeena, who allies with Kamille across such television series. Suzaku's corruption in the narrative resulted into the writers changing his way of speaking from the innocent "boku" to the aggressive "ore" especially after Euphemia's death which reminds him of the trauma of his father's death. Suzaku originally had a "sharper" look to him. Nanase Ohkawa originally imagined him as having Chinese-like, sharp, single-eyelid eyes.

Takahiro Sakurai was in a "spiritual state of nothingness" when voicing the character. As over two years have passed between the recording of the first episode and the final episode, he was surprised to going back to the character. He felt the ending painful. The ending was decided upon beforehand. Although it was eventually cut, Taniguchi had Okouchi write a script for episode 1, one which began with the scene of Suzaku attempting to kill Lelouch, which would be repeated in the second half. From Taniguchi's point of view, Lelouch and Suzaku's relationship did not go beyond that of reunited childhood friends; The director wanted to turn it into a pure "friendship". The director was often stressed by the challenge the two characters gave each other. This eventually led to the two characters reform their relationship in the finale. Lelouch's actor Jun Fukuyama regarded Suzaku as a heroic figure based on their point of views. Writer Okouchi says that while Lelouch is important to bring peace to the world at the cause of his life, Suzaku and several other characters have to remain alive to live up to his legacy. That end is to Lelouch and to Suzaku both the punishment and the salvation at the same time. Fukuyama regarded Suzaku's new persona as Zero as his own way of atoning for his sins. Suzaku killing Lelouch was decided by the staff ever since the series began.

For the film Lelouch of the Resurrection, Okouchi did not want to portray Suzaku as a heroine and instead be an equal to Lelouch and C.C. despite having made captive. Okouchi discussed the idea that while Lelouch is not a person who fights for justice, he would ally with other forces to rescue either Suzaku, C.C. or Nunnally. In the case of Suzaku's characterization in the movie, Okouchi believed he was more angered than in the television series due to his new Zero persona as he has been hiding his true identity after killing the Lelouch in the ending of the tv series. This is why when Suzaku spots a revived Lelouch in the movie, he sees this as a betrayal to the Zero Requiem they coordinated and briefly attacks him. The writer believes this drama was important for the plot to progress. As the movie primarily centers around Lelouch's resurrection, Okouchi decided the most important subplot was his relationship with C.C. and was not able to focus more with Suzaku or Nunnally due to it being less important. For the English dub of the series, Suzaku is voiced by Yuri Lowenthal.

== Reception ==
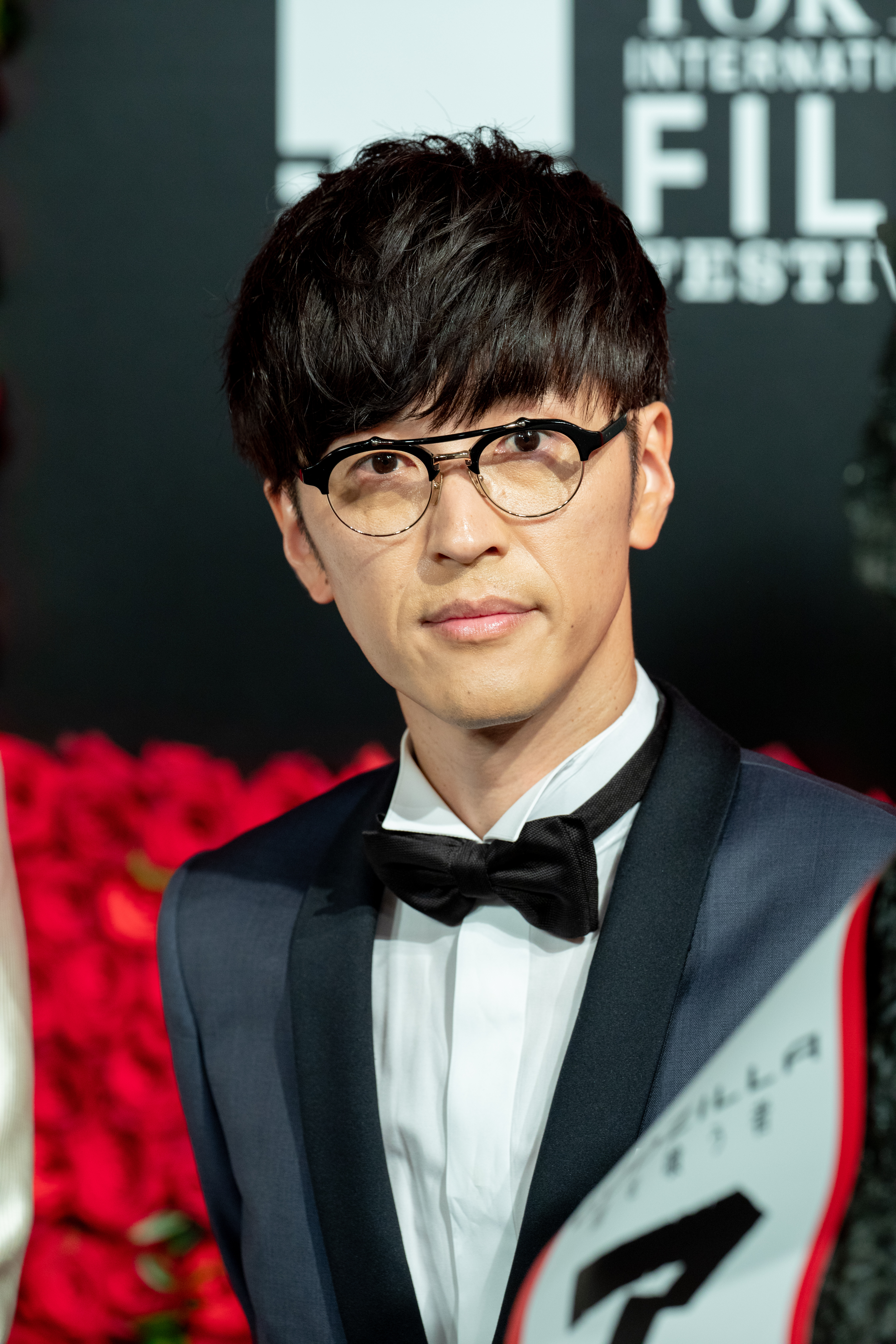
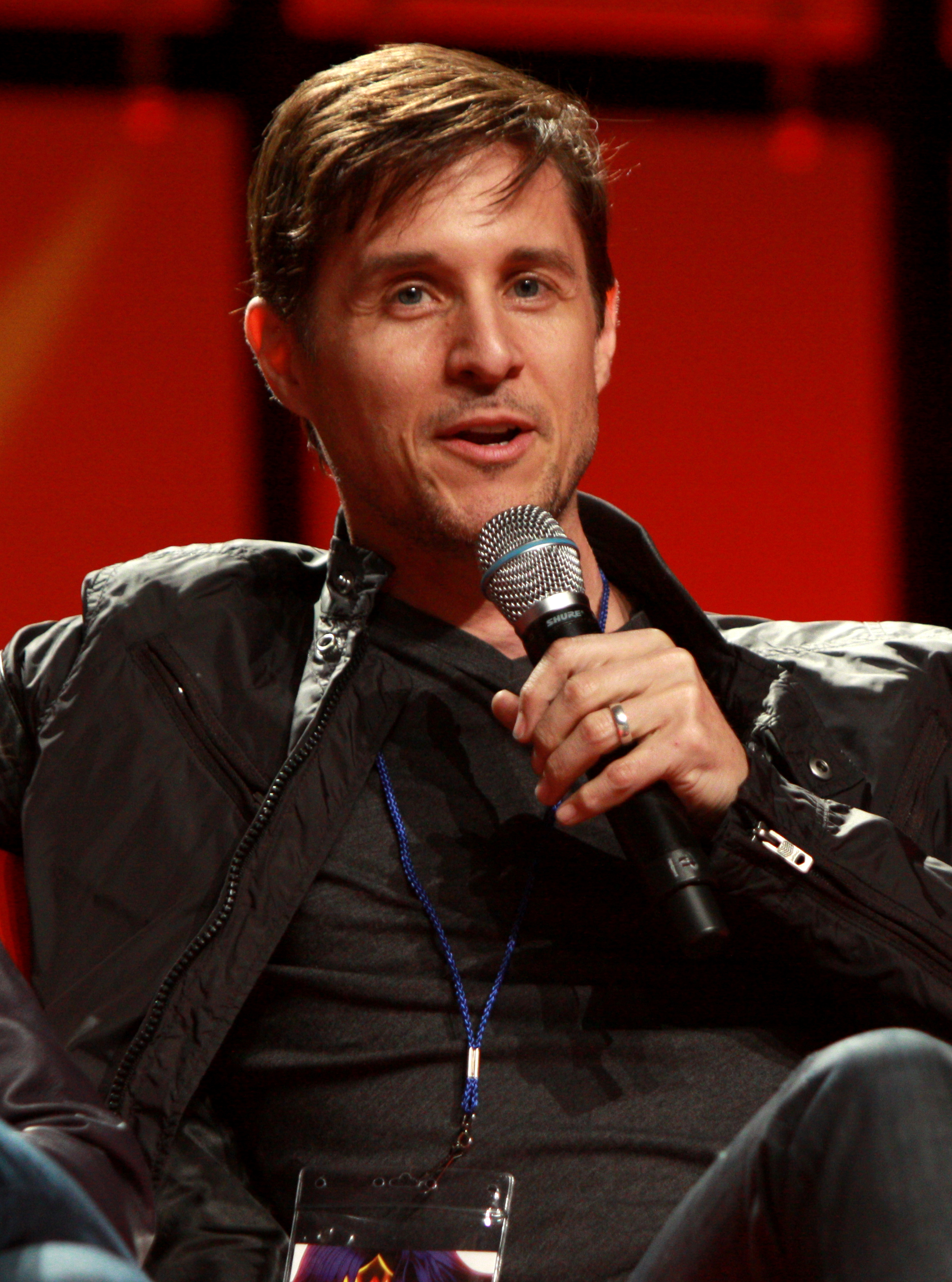
Takahiro Sakurai and Yuri Lowenthal voiced Suzaku.

In the 29th Anime Grand Prix, Suzaku was sixth place with 143 votes, then 19th and 13th, respectively, in the following two. In the 2007 Seiyu Awards, Takahiro Sakurai was a nominee in the category "Best Actors in supporting roles" for his portrayal as Suzaku, but lost to Akira Ishida and Kouki Miyata. The National News noted Suzaku's popularity led a surprising amount of cosplayer to pursue buying clothes but gave up due to the pricing they have to pay.

Critical reception to Suzaku has been mainly positive. Anime News Network's Bamboo Dong regarded Suzaku as a likable character, contrasting his role and personality with Lelouch's. Kevin Leathers from UK Anime Network agreed with Dong, as Suzaku "counter-balance[s]" Lelouch's alter ego due to how he does not wish violence. Moreover, IGN's D.F. Smith described Suzaku as Lelouch's "opposite number", and also gave praise to the friendship the two share. While reviewing an episode from the series, Ramsey Isler found comical and disappointing how Suzaku was forced to stay at school for extra hours having just finished a highly dangerous mission. His confrontation against Lelouch in the first season's finale was praised mainly because of Suzaku's mentality and his feelings regarding Zero's identity which he confesses he denied accepting such revelation. Kotaku found Suzaku as an interesting lead due to his irony of working for Britannia in order to change the Empire once taking over. While this causes to see himself as "monster" due to working for them, he maintains a good duality with Lelouch's methods which are seen as similar too. As the series' second half goes across, Kotaku noted that Suzaku finds himself more tormented by his actions, mostly when he nukes Tokyo using military weapons forced by Lelouch's Geass to survive against Kallen's Knightmare. As a result, the site felt Suzaku sees himself as "irredeemable". His final actions in the series' finale were also the subject of praise due to how Suzaku and Lelouch decide to become "evil" in order to end the chaos and create a greater good.

DVDTalk.com praised the handling of the first season's finale in regards to Suzaku's relationship with Lelouch who while, about to become allies, the plot twist involving Euphemia causes a large impact on their roles in the story which might appeal to the audience. THEM Anime Reviews stated that their relationship is one of the most entertaining part of the movie as a result of how they are childhood friends yet across the story, they become enemies. The Fandom Post noted that Suzaku and Lelouch's relationship might attract female viewers so he recommended an anthology manga to them, praising the multiple designs presented. Comic Book Resources claimed that Suzaku often received negative backlash by the fandom due to his violent actions and how he often opposes Lelouch thanks to his skills as a soldier the writer found overpowered, most notably in the second half of Code Geass. He further claimed that both are foils of each other due to how they joined different groups for different approaches.

The Fandom Post enjoyed how in Code Geass: Lelouch of the Re;surrection, Suzaku is still Lelouch's best friend. Meanwhile, Anime News Network noted that the film explored Lelouch's consequences in regards to the series' finale with Suzaku and C.C. being the only ones who took his side. On the other hand, Kotaku criticized Suzaku and Lelouch's role in the OVAs Akito the Exiled due to their lack of relevance while making the former angst for having the job of bodyguarding Lelouch during the time he hated him following the events of the first season. The rivalry was praised by Nicole Soto Rodríguez due to how dangerous are the methods employed by Suzaku and Lelouch and how both come across as hypocrites when defending each other as the narrative explores philosophies involving them. Ultimately, both Suzaku and Lelouch become like each other as they fail their own values and only find the objective they want when joining forces.
