= Code Black: Hayabiki no Lelouch =

Japanese manga series

- First tankōbon volume cover, featuring Lelouch Lamperouge

コードブラック 速弾きのルルーシュ (Kōdo Burakku Hayabiki no Rurūshu)
- Genre: Gag
- Manga
- Written by: Tomajirō Hoshi
- Published by: Kodansha
- Magazine: Young Magazine the 3rd
- Original run: November 6, 2014 – October 6, 2015
- Volumes: 2
- icon

Code Black: Hayabiki no Lelouch (Japanese: コードブラック 速弾きのルルーシュ, Hepburn: Kōdo Burakku Hayabiki no Rurūshu; "Code Black: Lelouch of the Shred Guitar") is a Japanese manga series written and illustrated by Tomajirō Hoshi. It is a spin-off to the original anime series Code Geass. The manga was serialized in Kodansha's seinen manga magazine Young Magazine the 3rd from November 2014 to October 2015, with its chapters collected in two wideban volumes.

== Publication ==
Written and illustrated by Tomajirō Hoshi, Code Black: Hayabiki no Lelouch was serialized in Kodansha's seinen manga magazine Young Magazine the 3rd from November 6, 2014, to October 6, 2015. Kodansha collected its chapters in two wideban volumes, released on June 5 and December 4, 2015.

=== Volumes ===
No.	Japanese release date	Japanese ISBN
1	June 5, 2015	978-4-06-377185-5
2	December 4, 2015	978-4-06-377359-0
