= Code Geass =

Japanese anime television series

- Code Geass: Lelouch of the Rebellion
- Cover of Code Geass: Lelouch of the Rebellion Blu-ray box set

コードギアス 反逆のルルーシュ (Kōdo Giasu: Hangyaku no Rurūshu)
- Genre: Alternate history; Mecha; Military fiction
- Created by: Gorō Taniguchi; Ichirō Ōkouchi
- Anime television series

Code Geass: Lelouch of the Rebellion
- Directed by: Gorō Taniguchi
- Produced by: Hiroshi Morotomi; Yoshitaka Kawaguchi; Takuo Minegishi; Atsushi Yukawa
- Written by: Ichirō Ōkouchi
- Music by: Kōtarō Nakagawa; Hitomi Kuroishi
- Studio: Sunrise
- Licensed by: Crunchyroll (Note: In North America through Crunchyroll, LLC (formerly known as Funimation), in the United Kingdom through Crunchyroll UK and Ireland (formerly known as Manga Entertainment) and in Australia through Crunchyroll Pty. Ltd. (formerly known as Madman Anime).); SEA: Odex; Medialink
- Original network: JNN (MBS, TBS)
- English network: AU: ABC2; PH: TV5, Hero; US: Adult Swim, Crunchyroll Channel
- Original run: October 6, 2006 – July 29, 2007
- Episodes: 25
- Anime television series

Code Geass: Lelouch of the Rebellion R2
- Directed by: Gorō Taniguchi
- Produced by: Hiroshi Morotomi; Yoshitaka Kawaguchi; Takuo Minegishi; Atsushi Yukawa
- Written by: Ichirō Ōkouchi
- Music by: Kōtarō Nakagawa; Hitomi Kuroishi
- Studio: Sunrise
- Licensed by: Crunchyroll; SEA: Odex
- Original network: JNN (MBS, TBS)
- English network: PH: TV5, Hero; US: Adult Swim, Crunchyroll Channel
- Original run: April 6, 2008 – September 28, 2008
- Episodes: 25
Further information
Original video animation
Code Geass: Lelouch of the Rebellion; Special Edition "Black Rebellion"
| Directed by | Gorō Taniguchi |
| Written by | Ichirō Ōkouchi |
| Music by | Kōtarō Nakagawa; Hitomi Kuroishi |
| Studio | Sunrise |
| Released | February 22, 2008 |
| Runtime | 118 minutes |
Original video animation
Code Geass: Lelouch of the Rebellion R2 Special Edition "Zero Requiem"
| Directed by | Gorō Taniguchi |
| Written by | Ichirō Ōkouchi |
| Music by | Kōtarō Nakagawa; Hitomi Kuroishi |
| Studio | Sunrise |
| Released | July 24, 2009 |
| Runtime | 118 minutes |
Light novel
Code Geass: Lelouch of the Rebellion
| Written by | Mamoru Iwasa |
| Published by | Kadokawa Shoten |
| English publisher | NA: Bandai Visual |
| Magazine | The Sneaker |
| Original run | April 28, 2007 – March 1, 2008 |
| Volumes | 5 |
Video game
Code Geass: Lelouch of the Rebellion Lost Colors
| Genre | Visual novel |
| Platform | PlayStation 2; PlayStation Portable |
| Released | JP: March 27, 2008 |
Light novel
Code Geass: Lelouch of the Rebellion Red Tracks
| Written by | Mamoru Iwasa |
| Published by | Kadokawa Shoten |
| Magazine | The Sneaker |
| Published | April 1, 2008 |
| Volumes | 1 |
Light novel
Code Geass: Lelouch of the Rebellion R2
| Written by | Mamoru Iwasa |
| Published by | Kadokawa Shoten |
| Magazine | The Sneaker |
| Original run | June 1, 2008 – March 1, 2009 |
| Volumes | 4 |
Manga
Code Geass: Lelouch of the Rebellion
| Written by | Ichirō Ōkouchi |
| Illustrated by | Majiko! |
| Published by | Kadokawa Shoten |
| English publisher | NA: Bandai Entertainment (expired) |
| Magazine | Monthly Asuka |
| Original run | December 26, 2006 – February 24, 2010 |
| Volumes | 8 |
Manga
Code Geass: Suzaku of the Counterattack
| Written by | Atsuro Yomino |
| Published by | Kadokawa Shoten |
| English publisher | NA: Bandai Entertainment (expired) |
| Magazine | Beans Ace |
| Original run | October 10, 2006 – August 9, 2008 |
| Volumes | 2 |
Manga
Code Geass: Nightmare of Nunnally
| Written by | Takuma Tomomasa |
| Published by | Kadokawa Shoten |
| English publisher | NA: Bandai Entertainment (expired) |
| Magazine | Comp Ace |
| Original run | June 26, 2007 – April 25, 2009 |
| Volumes | 5 |
Manga
Code Geass: Tales of an Alternate Shogunate
| Written by | Ganjii |
| Published by | Kadokawa Shoten |
| Magazine | Kerokero Ace |
| Original run | May 26, 2008 – August 26, 2008 |
| Volumes | 1 |
Manga
Code Geass: Renya of Darkness
| Written by | Gorō Taniguchi |
| Illustrated by | Takuma Tomomasa |
| Published by | Kadokawa Shoten |
| Magazine | Shōnen Ace |
| Original run | May 26, 2010 – August 26, 2013 |
| Volumes | 7 |
Manga
Code Geass: Oz the Reflection
| Written by | Chika Tojo |
| Published by | Kadokawa |
| Magazine | Newtype Ace; Comp Ace |
| Original run | April 10, 2012 – July 26, 2014 |
| Volumes | 5 |
Light novel
Code Geass: Oz the Reflection
| Written by | Shigeru Morita |
| Illustrated by | Eiji Nakata |
| Published by | Hobby Japan |
| Original run | May 25, 2012 – April 25, 2016 |
| Volumes | 5 |
Original video animation
Code Geass: Nunnally in Wonderland
| Directed by | Makoto Baba |
| Written by | Yuuichi Nomura |
| Music by | Kotaro Nakagawa |
| Studio | Sunrise |
| Released | July 27, 2012 |
| Runtime | 28 minutes |
Original video animation
Code Geass: Akito the Exiled
| Directed by | Kazuki Akane |
| Produced by | Hirofumi Inagaki; Yoshitaka Kawaguchi; Jun Yukawa; Osamu Hosokawa (1–2); Shuusaku Iba (1–2); Nobuaki Abe (3–6); Hirotsugu Ogisu (3–6) |
| Written by | Hiroshi Ōnogi |
| Music by | Ichiko Hashimoto |
| Studio | Sunrise |
| Licensed by | Crunchyroll |
| Released | August 4, 2012 – February 6, 2016 |
| Episodes | 5 |
Light novel
Code Geass: Akito the Exiled
| Written by | Ukyō Kodachi |
| Published by | Kadokawa Shoten |
| Original run | July 6, 2013 – June 25, 2016 |
| Volumes | 3 |
Manga
Code Geass: Oz the Reflection O2
| Written by | Chika Tojo |
| Published by | Kadokawa |
| Magazine | Comp Ace |
| Original run | August 26, 2014 – February 26, 2016 |
| Volumes | 5 |
Manga
Code Geass: Lelouch of the Rebellion Re;
| Written by | Kōjirō Taniguchi |
| Illustrated by | Tomofumi Ogasawara |
| Published by | Kadokawa |
| Magazine | Comic Newtype |
| Original run | May 25, 2018 – March 20, 2020 |
| Volumes | 4 |
Manga
Code Geass: Lelouch of the Re;surrection
| Written by | Kōjirō Taniguchi |
| Illustrated by | Tomofumi Ogasawara |
| Published by | Kadokawa |
| Magazine | Comic Newtype |
| Original run | April 24, 2020 – November 7, 2025 |
| Volumes | 6 |
Manga
Code Geass: Pure Almaria
| Written by | Fumiya Nagatsuki |
| Illustrated by | Atsushi Soga |
| Published by | Kadokawa |
| Magazine | KadoComi |
| Original run | Jan 24, 2025 – present |
| Volumes | 2 |
Manga
Mobile Suit Gundam Wing × Code Geass: Lelouch of the Rebellion – Minuet Zero
| Written by | Kōjirō Taniguchi |
| Illustrated by | Tomofumi Ogasawara |
| Published by | Kadokawa |
| Magazine | KadoComi |
| Original run | July 10, 2026 – present |
Anime television series
Code Geass: Star Chaser Aspal
| Directed by | Kazuya Nomura |
| Written by | Mado Nozaki |
| Music by | Taro Iwashiro |
| Studio | Sunrise |
| Original run | 2027 – scheduled |
Manga
Code Black: Hayabiki no Lelouch (2014–15)
Films
Code Geass Lelouch of the Rebellion (2017–18); Code Geass Lelouch of the Re;surrection (2019); Code Geass: Rozé of the Recapture (2024)
- icon

Code Geass: Lelouch of the Rebellion (Japanese: コードギアス 反逆のルルーシュ, Hepburn: Kōdo Giasu: Hangyaku no Rurūshu), often referred to as simply Code Geass, is a Japanese anime television series produced by Sunrise. It was directed by Gorō Taniguchi and written by Ichirō Ōkouchi, with original character designs by Clamp. It follows the exiled prince Lelouch Lamperouge, who obtains the "power of absolute obedience" from a mysterious woman named C.C.. Using this supernatural power, known as Geass, he leads a rebellion against the rule of the authoritarian Holy Britannian Empire, commanding a series of mecha battles.

Code Geass was broadcast in Japan on MBS from October 2006 to July 2007. Its sequel series, Code Geass: Lelouch of the Rebellion R2, ran as a simulcast on MBS and TBS from April to September 2008. The series has also been adapted into various manga and light novels.

Initiation, Transgression, and Glorification, a three-part compilation film recapping the events of both anime series' seasons, was released between 2017 and 2018. A new original film titled Code Geass Lelouch of the Re;surrection, taking place after the Zero Requiem, was released in theaters in February 2019. Code Geass: Rozé of the Recapture, was announced in December 2020 as part of a 10-year plan. On December 7, 2024, after the screening of Code Geass: Rozé of the Recapture, series producer Taniguchi revealed that multiple sequels are being produced.

Bandai Entertainment licensed most parts of the franchise for English release in December 2007, airing the series English-dubbed on Adult Swim in the United States. Most manga and light novels have also been published in North America by Bandai.

Code Geass has been well-received in Japan, selling over a million DVD and Blu-ray discs. Both seasons have won several awards at the Tokyo International Anime Fair, the Animage Anime Grand Prix, and the Animation Kobe event. The series received critical acclaim for its story, voice acting, large audience appeal, the conflicts among its main characters, and the moral questions it presented. It is considered to be one of the best anime series of all time.

== Synopsis ==
=== Setting ===
Flag of the Holy Britannian Empire

The world is divided into three superpowers: the Holy Britannian Empire (the Americas; also called Britannia), the Chinese Federation (Asia), and the Europa United (Europe and Africa). The story takes place after the Holy Britannian Empire's conquest of Japan on August 10, 2010, a.t.b., by means of Britannia's newest weapon, the "Autonomous Armored Knight," or "Knightmare Frame." In turn, Britannia effectively strips Japan and its citizens of all rights and freedoms and renames the country Area 11, with its citizens referred to as Elevens.

The main point of divergence for this timeline appears to be that during the reign of Elizabeth I, though the queen remained unmarried, she bore a son (the fictional ancestor of the Britannian Emperors, Henry IX). However, several alternative timelines exist in the Code Geass universe, and the point of divergence may differ between each. The most common point of divergence in all timelines is Julius Caesar's invasions of Britain between 55 and 54 BC ending in failure when the British Celts unite under Alwin the First. Alwin forces the Romans out and establishes the First United British Kingdom in 54 BC, which becomes the first year of the Britannian Calendar (1 a.t.b, first year of Ascension Throne Britannia, with 55 BC as 1 b.t.b., the first year Before Throne Britannia). While other Roman invasions follow, by 43 a.t.b. (12 BC) Britannia is recognized as an independent kingdom by the Roman Empire. As a result, while many events in the Code Geass universe take place on nominally similar dates to actual history, they occur in fact half a century earlier (as with the French Revolution of 1789 a.t.b., or 1734 AD). Almost all timelines share a version of the Geass Order/Cult/Directorate, an organization that controls Geass users and abilities, and which is heavily involved with the Britannian Imperial Family.

=== Plot ===
Lelouch vi Britannia is an exiled Britannian prince, the son of Emperor Charles zi Britannia and his royal consort Marianne vi Britannia. Lelouch has a younger sister, Nunnally vi Britannia. Marianne was brutally murdered in the palace, and Nunnally, who witnessed the murder of their mother, was so traumatized that she lost her sight, and stray bullets to her lower body took away her ability to walk. Lelouch is furious with his father, believing he failed his mother and sister by turning a blind eye to their mother's death and failing to pursue their mother's killer.

Lelouch and Nunnally are sent as political pawns to Japan to lull the Japanese government into a false sense of security. After the siblings are sent to Japan, Japan is attacked and defeated by Britannia. With the ruins of Japan as a background, Lelouch vows to his Japanese friend Suzaku Kururugi that he will one day obliterate Britannia as an act of vengeance against his father.

Seven years later, Lelouch, now under the alias of Lelouch Lamperouge, is a popular yet withdrawn student at Ashford Academy. Lelouch becomes involved in a terrorist attack and finds a mysterious girl known only as C.C. (C2), who saves Lelouch's life from the Britannian Royal Guard by making a contract with him and granting Lelouch a power known as Geass (ギアス, Giasu). This power, also known as the "Power of Kings" (王の力, Ō no Chikara), allows him to command anyone to do whatever he wants, including bending their will to live, fight, or die for him. This power can affect an individual just once and only through direct eye contact. Lelouch decides to use his Geass to find his mother's murderers, destroy the Britannian Empire, and create a better world where Nunnally can live happily. In the process, Lelouch becomes Zero, a masked vigilante and the leader of the resistance group known as the Black Knights in the rebellion against Britannia's tyranny, gaining popularity and support among much of the Japanese. However, this comes with a great cost; caught up in a conflict where he does not know the full extent of his powers, Lelouch navigates various conflicts with Suzaku, a resistance member named Kallen Stadtfeld, the incredibly powerful Britannian army (the strongest in the world), his own half-siblings, and many others in a battle that will forever change the world.

== Production ==
Code Geass began as a concept developed at Sunrise by Ichirō Ōkouchi and Gorō Taniguchi, who proposed it to producer Yoshitaka Kawaguchi. Kawaguchi had previously approached Okouchi and Taniguchi during the production of Planetes. The basic idea for the plot consisted of a "hero" who led a secret organization, which later developed into a conflict between two characters with different values and who belonged to the same military unit, who eventually became Lelouch Lamperouge and Suzaku Kururugi.

During these initial planning stages, Kawaguchi also contacted the noted manga artist group Clamp. This was the first time Clamp had ever been requested to design the characters of an anime series. Clamp signed onto the project early during these development stages and provided numerous ideas, which helped develop the series' setting and characters.

While developing the character designs for Lelouch, the protagonist of the series, Clamp originally designed his hair color to be white. Ageha Ohkawa, head writer at Clamp, said she had visualized him as a character to which "everyone" could relate as being "cool," and literally, a "beauty." During these planning stages, Clamp and the Sunrise staff discussed a number of possible inspirations for the characters, including KinKi Kids and Tackey & Tsubasa. They had wanted to create a "hit show," a series that would appeal to "everyone." Lelouch's alter ego, Zero, was one of the earliest developed characters, with Ōkouchi having wanted a mask to be included as a part of the series, feeling it was necessary for it to be a Sunrise show, and Clamp wanting a unique design never prior seen in any Sunrise series (said mask was nicknamed "tulip" for its distinctive design).

The concept for the Geass may have been inspired by the Irish and Welsh legends of "Geas" or "Geis." A geas is a compulsion laid on someone to do or not do something. While the geas itself does not lie on any spectrum, the benefits or actions of it may be decidedly benevolent or malevolent. The concept fits into the wider fictional world of the series and its lore of British inspirations.

Clamp's finalized original character design art, illustrated by its lead artist Mokona, was subsequently converted into animation character designs for the series by Sunrise's character designer Takahiro Kimura, who had previously spent "every day" analyzing Clamp's art and style from their art books and manga series. In working on the animation character designs, he focused on designing them so as to enable the series' other animators to apply them without deviating from Clamp's original art style.

The music for the series was composed by Kōtarō Nakagawa and Hitomi Kuroishi, who had earlier worked with the series' core staff in Planetes and Taniguchi's earlier work, Gun X Sword. In addition to the incidental music featured in each episode, Kuroishi also composed numerous insert songs for the series, including "Stories," "Masquerade," "Alone," and "Innocent Days," which were each performed by Kuroishi herself, while "Picaresque" and "Callin'" were performed by the singer-songwriter Mikio Sakai, who had also earlier worked with Nakagawa and Kuroishi in Planetes. The bands FLOW, Ali Project, Jinn, SunSet Swish, Access, and Orange Range provided songs for the opening and ending sequences in the original broadcast.

When the series was being developed for broadcast on MBS TV, it had been given the network's Sunday evening prime time slot, which was later changed to a Thursday late-night time slot. Due to this change, the overall outlook and some elements of the series were changed and further developed to suit the more mature, late-night audience. The supernatural "Geass" ability finally came into the show at this point and was first conceived as a special power granted by an "angel" to the main character, though this last part was also modified.

== Media ==
=== Anime ===
Code Geass officially premiered on the Mainichi Broadcasting System (MBS) television station on October 5, 2006 (01:25 JST on October 6, 2006). Its satellite television premiere across Japan was on November 7, 2006, on Animax. Upon the airing of the first 23 episodes, the series went on hiatus on March 29, 2007, and completed the broadcast of the first series with a contiguous one-hour broadcast of episodes 24 and 25 on Saturday, July 28, 2007.

Code Geass: Lelouch of the Rebellion was widely popular in Japan, and it was followed with the development of its sequel, Code Geass: Lelouch of the Rebellion R2 (コードギアス 反逆のルルーシュR2, Kōdo Giasu Hangyaku no Rurūshu Āru Tsū), which was first announced in the March 2007 issue of Newtype and later confirmed by Sunrise producer Yoshitaka Kawaguchi on the series' official staff blog on March 9, 2007.

Code Geass: Lelouch of the Rebellion R2 premiered on all Japan News Network (JNN) member stations (like MBS and TBS) on April 6, 2008, in the primetime anime timeslot, with the timeslot changing from 18:00 JST on Saturdays to 17:00 JST on Sundays. Prior to the series' television broadcast, three private preview screenings of episode 1 were held on March 15 and March 16 in Osaka and Tokyo respectively, which was attended by the series' Japanese voice actors as well as a pool of 3,800 randomly selected applicants. On April 15, 2008, at 17:00 JST, the last 6 minutes of the then unaired third episode was accidentally posted onto the Internet due to an error by Bandai Channel, Bandai's online broadcast channel and online distributor, in the midst of testing a system preventing illegal online uploads.

The Code Geass: The Miraculous Birthday (コードギアス 反逆のルルーシュ キセキの誕生日, Kōdo Giasu: Kiseki no Tanjōbi) drama film was based on a live event held in Tokyo, Japan, on Lelouch's birthday.

An original video animation (OVA) anime release titled Code Geass: Nunnally in Wonderland (コードギアス 反逆のルルーシュ: ナナリーinワンダーランド, Kōdo Giasu Hangyaku no Rurūshu: Nanarī in wandārando) was announced and revealed through the anime's official website. Takahiro Kimura did the character designs for the series. Makoto Baba was assigned as the director of the OVA, while episode scriptwriter Yuuichi Nomura and composer Kotaro Nakagawa returned for the project. In the story, Lelouch makes the ultimate use of his Geass for his sister Nunnally, who loves Alice in Wonderland. The Blu-ray edition was released by Bandai Visual on July 27, 2012, with English subtitles and bundled with a 40-page picture book.

In December 2025, a new anime series, titled Code Geass: Star Chaser Aspal, was announced as part of the Code Geass franchise's 20th anniversary project. It is set to premiere in 2027. Kazuya Nomura is directing the series, with Mado Nozaki serving as the series composer, Rolua as the character designer, and Taro Iwashiro composing the music. The series stars Ivan Shibata as Aspal and Hibiku Yamamura as Zoe.

==== Akito the Exiled ====
A new Code Geass series was first revealed on December 5, 2009. In April 2010, it was officially revealed that a new Code Geass side story anime called Code Geass: Akito the Exiled (コードギアス 亡国のアキト, Kōdo Giasu: Bōkoku no Akito) would be directed by Kazuki Akane (The Vision of Escaflowne). The side story is an OVA series set in Europe during the Britannian invasion of the continent between Lelouch of the Rebellion's two seasons. Originally intended to be released in four chapters, production of a fifth Akito the Exiled episode was announced after the Japanese debut of the third entry on May 2, 2015. Along with the two seasons of the television series, the OVAs are licensed by Funimation. In January 2016, Manga Entertainment, which licensed the series in the UK, listed that they would release the first two episodes on Blu-ray with an English dub on December 5, 2016. They later changed the date to April 10, 2017, but the date was once again pushed back to October 1, 2017. Madman Entertainment has also released the first three episodes on DVD. Funimation announced it would release the series in early 2017. On March 15, 2017, Funimation officially announced a pre-order and release date of June 27, 2017. It was released as a Blu-ray and DVD combo pack with both subbed and dubbed audio. The OVAs have been released in only Japan and Italy.

==== Films ====
A three-part theatrical compilation anime film of the TV series was released, with the first film titled Code Geass: Lelouch of the Rebellion I – Initiation (コードギアス 反逆のルルーシュ 興道, Code Geass – Hangyaku no Lelouch – Kōdō; "Code Geass: Lelouch of the Rebellion: The Awakening Path") released on October 21, 2017. The second film titled Code Geass: Lelouch of the Rebellion II – Transgression (コードギアス 反逆のルルーシュ 叛道, Code Geass – Hangyaku no Lelouch – Handō; "Code Geass: Lelouch of the Rebellion: The Rebellion Path") was released on February 10, 2018. The film placed 8th in the mini-theater ranking on its opening weekend. The third compilation film, titled Code Geass: Lelouch of the Rebellion III – Glorification (コードギアス 反逆のルルーシュ 皇道, Code Geass – Hangyaku no Lelouch – Ōdō; "Code Geass: Lelouch of the Rebellion: The Imperial Path"), was released in theaters on May 26, 2018. Each film recounts the events of the two seasons of the animated series and the third film concluding the series and the movie's storyline.

Code Geass: Lelouch of the Re;surrection (コードギアス 復活のルルーシュ, Kōdo Giasu: Fukkatsu no Rurūshu) movie was announced on November 27, 2016. It was released in theaters in Japan on February 9, 2019. and is a sequel to the "Zero Requiem" arc of that continuity.

A new anime titled Code Geass: Z of the Recapture was announced on December 5, 2020, Lelouch's birthday. The new anime project is part of a new 10-year plan for the franchise by Studio Sunrise, with Yoshimitsu Ohashi is directing the anime, Noboru Kimura writing the scripts, and Takahiro Kimura returning to design the characters. It was later announced to be a four-part film series titled Code Geass: Rozé of the Recapture, with the first part releasing in Japanese theatres on May 10, 2024, the second releasing on June 7, the third releasing on July 5, and the fourth releasing on August 2. The film series was also streamed worldwide on Disney+ streaming service's Hulu and Star content hub in a 12-episode series format. In celebration of the new anime, the Code Geass Lelouch of the Re;surrection movie was re-released in 4D in Japanese theaters on January 29, 2021.

==== International licensing ====
Both seasons of Code Geass have been licensed for release in the United States by Bandai Entertainment, and the first season began airing on Cartoon Network's Adult Swim programming block in the U.S. on April 27, 2008; the second began airing on November 2, immediately following the first season. The series finale premiered on June 7, 2009, ending the second season and the rest of the story. On April 23, 2010, Adult Swim's broadcast rights to the series expired.

Following the closure of Bandai Entertainment in 2012, Sunrise announced at their official panel during Otakon 2013 that Funimation had licensed both seasons of Code Geass and, in addition, licensed Akito the Exiled, along with a handful of other former Bandai Entertainment titles.

In Australia and New Zealand, the series is sub-licensed to Madman Entertainment by Bandai Entertainment USA and began airing on Australian channel ABC2 on January 19, 2009. As of 2018, it is available on Australian Netflix.

In the Philippines, the first season of Code Geass premiered on November 10, 2008, weekday nights at 7:30 p.m. PST, and ended on December 15, 2008, through TV5, while season 2 premiered on May 4, 2009, and ended on June 5, 2009, weekday nights at 6:00 p.m. PST, with a weekend afternoon recap of the week's episodes also on TV5. Despite the poor ratings it attained due to competition with local TV newscasts and prime-time soap operas, the series was able to attain a huge following and became one of the most talked-about anime series in the country during its run. Code Geass had its Philippine cable premiere on July 27, 2010, through Hero TV.

In Italy, the first season aired from September 23, 2009, to February 25, 2010, on Rai 4, while season 2 was broadcast on Rai 4 from March 4, 2010, to August 12, 2010; both seasons were broadcast at about 11:10 p.m.

Sunrise announced at its official panel at Anime Boston 2018 that Funimation had licensed the recap film trilogy.

Funimation announced that they had licensed the Code Geass Lelouch of the Re;surrection film for its North American theatrical release in May 2019.

=== Manga ===
Kadokawa Shoten has published four separate manga adaptations, each containing an alternate storyline. The first four manga series have been licensed for an English-language release in North America by Bandai Entertainment. The first, Code Geass: Lelouch of the Rebellion, by Majiko~! and originally serialized in Monthly Asuka, focused on the protagonist of the series, Lelouch Lamperouge, with few differences from the anime's basic storyline. The most noticeable difference from the anime version is the absence of the Knightmare frames. Its chapters were collected in eight tankōbon volumes released from December 26, 2008, to March 26, 2010. Bandai's English adaptation of the series was published from July 29, 2008, to February 15, 2011.

The second manga is Code Geass: Suzaku of the Counterattack (コードギアス 反攻のスザク, Kōdo Giasu: Hankō no Suzaku). It was written by Atsuro Yomino and serialized in Beans A magazine. It focuses on the character Suzaku Kururugi in an alternate reality, where he fights against the criminal organization known as the Black Knights. While initially bearing a strong resemblance to its source, the manga is a tokusatsu show where the Lancelot mecha is now a bodysuit that Suzaku wears (the suit makes a cameo appearance as a costume in the 21st episode of the first season of the anime); further, the characters of Cecile Croomy and Euphemia li Britannia are composited as Mariel Lubie. It was released in two volumes on June 26, 2007, and September 26, 2008. The first English volume was released on January 6, 2009, and the second followed it on October 13, 2009.

Code Geass: Nightmare of Nunnally (コードギアス ナイトメア・オブ・ナナリー, Kōdo Giasu Naitomea Obu Nanarī), serialized in Comp Ace and written by Tomomasa Takuma, focuses on Lelouch's sister, Nunnally Lamperouge, who goes into searching for her missing brother when her health is restored by an entity named Nemo. It was published in five volumes from June 26, 2007, to April 25, 2009. The English volumes were published from June 9, 2009, to March 23, 2010.

A fourth manga adaptation, Code Geass: Tales of an Alternate Shogunate (幕末異聞録 コードギアス 反逆のルルーシュ, Bakumatsu Ibun Roku Kōdo Giasu Hangyaku no Rurūshu), was serialized in Kerokero Ace. Set in an alternate 1853, Lelouch is the commander of the Shogunate's military counterinsurgence brigade known as the Shinsengumi, which fights the Black Revolutionaries, a rebel group led by a masked individual known as Rei. It was released in a single volume on October 25, 2010, while the English version was published on May 10, 2011.

In late 2009, Bandai announced a new project greenlit for 2010. A manga, titled Code Geass: Renya of Darkness (コードギアス 漆黒の連夜, Kōdo Giasu: Shikkoku no Renya), was the first product announced. The story takes place in the same official Code Geass history as the anime, but in a different era, with the anime director Goro Taniguchi scripting the story. The title character, Renya, is a 17-year-old boy who encounters a mysterious, perpetually young witch named "Reifū C.C." who has appeared in Japan's historical Edo era to seek a new partner for a covenant. It began publication in the May 2010 issue of Shōnen Ace. Bandai Entertainment announced that it would publish the manga in English, as with the other adaptations. On January 2, 2012, as a part of Bandai Entertainment's announced restructuring, they have since, among other titles, revoked publishing of Code Geass: Renya of Darkness for English release.

A manga adaptation of the Zero Requiem storyline by writer Kōjirō Taniguchi and artist Tomofumi Ogasawara, titled Code Geass: Lelouch of the Rebellion Re; (コードギアス 反逆のルルーシュ Re), was published on the Comic Newtype website from May 25, 2018, to March 20, 2020. Its chapters were collected in four volumes.

A follow-up manga by Taniguchi and Ogasawara, adapting Lelouch of the Re;surrection, was published on Comic Newtype from April 24, 2020, to November 7, 2025. Its chapters were collected in six volumes. The manga begins with an original prequel storyline in its first volume, before adapting the events of the film, with additional scenes and material, beginning in the second volume.

Writer Fumiya Nagatsuki and artist Atsushi Soga launched Code Geass: Pure Almaria (コードギアス 新潔のアルマリア) on Kadokawa's KadoComi digital platform on January 24, 2025. The manga connects Code Geass: Lelouch of the Re;surrection and Code Geass: Rozé of the Recapture, taking place after the events of the film.

Writer Kōjirō Taniguchi and artist Tomofumi Ogasawara launched a crossover manga with Gundam Wing, titled Mobile Suit Gundam Wing × Code Geass: Lelouch of the Rebellion – Minuet Zero (新機動戦記ガンダムW × コードギアス 反逆のルルーシュ メヌエット・ゼロ), on Kadokawa's KadoComi digital platform on July 10, 2026.

=== Audio CDs ===
The series has been adapted into a series of drama CDs called Sound Episodes, the first of which was released in Japan in April 2007 by Victor Entertainment, with new volumes released monthly. Written by many of the same writers as the series, these episodes are set between episodes and feature theme songs performed by the series voice actors. They have also been available online on a limited streaming basis on the Japanese internet website Biglobe.

In total, twelve drama CDs have been released. The first six, released between April 25, 2007, and September 27, 2007, cover the first season of the series, with the other six focusing on the second season.

==== Soundtrack ====
The music for the series, which is composed by Kōtarō Nakagawa and Hitomi Kuroishi, has been released across two original soundtracks, which are produced by Yoshimoto Ishikawa and released by Victor Entertainment. The first was released in Japan on December 20, 2006, and the second was released on March 24, 2007. The covers and jackets for both soundtracks were illustrated by Takahiro Kimura.

=== Light novels ===
Code Geass ('Code Geass') has been additionally novelized into a series of light novels. First serialized in Kadokawa Shoten's The Sneaker magazine, they are divided into two separate series corresponding with the series' two seasons. The first series, Code Geass: Lelouch of the Rebellion, spanned five volumes, with the first, labeled as volume 0, released in Japan on April 28, 2007, and the last on March 1, 2008. All five volumes in the first series of novels have been released in English by Bandai Visual. The first volume was released in November 2008, and the last one on February 23, 2010. The first novel acts as a prologue, focusing on how Lelouch befriended Suzaku Kururugi when the former prince and his sister, Nunnally Lamperouge, were sent to Japan as political hostages.

The second novel series, Code Geass: Lelouch of the Rebellion R2, covers the second season of the anime series, in which Lelouch continues his battle against the Britannian Empire. It was released in four volumes from June 1, 2008, to March 1, 2009. A single-volume side story novel, Code Geass: Lelouch of the Rebellion Red Tracks (コードギアス 反逆のルルーシュ 朱の軌跡, Kōdo Giasu: Hangyaku no Rurūshu Shu no Kiseki), was released on April 1, 2008, in Japan. It focuses on the life of teenager Kallen Stadtfeld, who becomes a soldier for the organization the Black Knights under Lelouch's leadership to defeat Britannia. On January 3, 2012, the English publication of the light novel adaptation of R2 was cancelled as part of Bandai Entertainment's planned restructuring, which had been announced the day before.

=== Video games ===
The series was also slated to be adapted into a series of video games, developed for the Nintendo DS, PlayStation Portable, and PlayStation 2 platforms, and published by Namco Bandai Games. A release on the Wii platform was cancelled for unknown reasons. All three games have only been released in Japanese.

The official website for the first Nintendo DS game launched on July 16, 2007, with the game being released a few months later, on October 25.

A second game, titled Code Geass: Lelouch of the Rebellion Lost Colors, was developed for the PlayStation Portable and PlayStation 2 and released in Japan on March 27, 2008. It is a visual novel game that follows a new protagonist named Rai (ライ), who suffers from amnesia. He has a Geass ability similar to Lelouch's but activated by voice.

The third game for the Nintendo DS, titled Code Geass: Lelouch of the Rebellion R2 – Geass Theater on the Board, was released on August 7, 2008. It is a collection of minigames featuring chibi forms of the characters. The player moves along a board through dice rolls, landing on different spots to activate minigames. The minigames are parody-style events with multiple genres.

Code Geass R2 appeared in From Software (Demon's Souls, Armored Core) and Banpresto's PlayStation 3 exclusive mecha action game Another Century's Episode R, released in Japan in August 2010 and in which both versions of Suzaku's Lancelot, Lelouch's Shinkiro, both versions of Kallen's Guren, and C.C.'s Akatsuki are playable. A fourth installment of the ACE franchise for the PlayStation Portable, Another Century's Episode Portable, included Suzaku's Lancelot Albion and Lelouch/Zero's Shinkiro.

Code Geass characters have appeared as costumes in the Japanese version of the PlayStation 3 game Tales of Graces F. These characters are Zero, Suzaku, C.C., and Kallen. It was discontinued for download on September 27, 2019.

On December 5, 2020, a mobile game called Code Geass: Genesic Re;CODE was announced as part of the 10-year plan by Studio Sunrise. Considered a direct sequel, the smartphone game featured stories about the Code Geass characters, including several new ones. It was released on October 4, 2021. The game's server ended in April 2023.

Code Geass: Lost Stories is a mobile game developed by f4samurai and DMM Games. It is a social game for smart phones and PCs, which launched in May 2022. It is set to end service in December 2026.

=== Artbooks ===
Two artbooks featuring illustrations of the series, Code Geass Graphics Zero (ISBN 4048540793) and Code Geass Graphics Ashford (ISBN 4048540807), have been published in Japan. Coinciding with the release of the second season of Code Geass was the publication of another artbook, Code Geass – Lelouch of the Rebellion illustrations Rebels (ISBN 4048541692), which featured 134 art pieces from the first season. Another 95-page artbook titled Code Geass: Lelouch of the Rebellion – The Complete Artbook (ISBN 9784048541183) has also been published. Finally, CLAMP, the well-known manga artist team that did the designs for Code Geass, put out their own artbook, entitled Code Geass x CLAMP: Mutuality.

=== Internet radio broadcasts ===
"Code Geass" has also been adapted into a series of weekly internet radio broadcasts, which were streamed online on the BEAT☆Net Radio! portal, the first of which, Code Geass: The Rebellion Diary (コードギアス 反逆日記, Kōdo Giasu: Hangyaku Nikki), began streaming on October 6, 2006. It featured Sayaka Ohara (the voice actor of Milly Ashford) and Satomi Arai (the voice actor of Sayoko Shinazaki). The second, Code Geass – Mountains of the Rebellion (コードギアス 反逆の山々, Kōdo Giasu Hangyaku no Yamayama), was first streamed on December 12, 2006, and was hosted by Jun Fukuyama (the voice actor of Lelouch) and Noriaki Sugiyama (the voice actor of Rivalz). During R2, a new show named Code Geass – LuluKuru Station (コードギアス ルルクルステーション, Kōdo Giasu Rurukuru Suteishōn) was streamed, hosted by Fukuyama and Takahiro Sakurai (voice actor of Suzaku).

== Reception ==
=== Critical response ===
Code Geass was met with critical acclaim and commercial success. Anime News Network (ANN) columnist Todd Ciolek attributed the popularity of Code Geass to "the series hitting every important fan sector," including a "complex cast of characters and a fast-paced story, told with Goro Taniguchi's capable direction" for "general-interest fans" to "pretty and just-a-little-broken heroes" for "yaoi-buying female fans." ANN's Carl Kimlinger also found that the series "has the skill and energy to carry viewers over the top with it, where they can spend a pleasurable few hours reveling in its melodramatic charms." He also adds that Taniguchi "executes the excesses of his series with care, skillfully intercutting events as Lelouch's plans come together (or fall apart) and using kinetic mecha combat."

T.H.E.M. Anime Reviews reviewer Dallas Marshall gave the series 6 out of 7 stars, stating that it was, "a melodramatic piece of science fiction that has more than enough going for it in terms of action and visuals but tends to go overboard with its emotionalism. If this minor flaw can be overlooked, there is an epic story to be told with a rather intriguing main character at the helm. Take away one star if that minor 'flaw' cannot be ignored."

A less favorable review was given by Carlo Santos of ANN, who gave it an overall "C" and wrote that the franchise "in a way, [...] reflects the malaise of a generation: the realization that old, rich, powerful people have screwed up the world and that the young are helpless to do anything about it." According to him, Lelouch's actions exemplify the wish to see problems like "economic collapse, class conflict, political instability, and radical extremism" solved by "Zero's vigilante methods," but Santos expressed doubt in such an approach and concluded that "the series is at its best when raising questions rather than offering a final solution" (the review focused on the manga adaptation of the story, which has certain differences compared with the original anime).

Code Geass's entry in The Encyclopedia of Science Fiction notes that the original show was commercially and critically successful, both in Japan and internationally. According to SFE, the show is widely regarded as one of the major science-fictional anime productions of the twenty-first century's first decade, notable for bringing the themes of Imperialism, collaborative guilt, and the ethics of political violence—familiar from earlier Sunrise mecha series such as the Mobile Suit Gundam franchise— to bear within an unusually intricate and psychologically oriented narrative framework, while adding a dash of supernatural in the vein of Neon Genesis Evangelion, but with more mature characters. However, the entry also notes that the post-resurrection franchise output has received a mixed critical reception, calling it "mediocre popcorn entertainment", while also stressing that the sequels do not diminish the original that precedes them.

=== Home video sales ===
By August 2008, over 900,000 Code Geass discs had been sold in Japan. Reportedly, Bandai Visual shipped over one million DVD and Blu-ray discs of the Code Geass franchise by November 2008, placing it among the most popular contemporary anime series in both Japan and North America. In 2008, the first volume of R2 was the fourth-bestselling anime DVD and Blu-ray disc in Japan, according to Amazon.com.

=== Box office ===
Episodes 1, 3, and 5 of Akito the Exiled were screened theatrically in Japan between 2012 and 2016, with episode 1 grossing ¥35,112,097 ($440,054) in 2012 and episodes 3 and 5 grossing ¥216,957,460 ($1,994,224) during 2015–2016. Combined, the three episodes grossed ¥252,069,557 ($2,434,280) at the Japanese box office.

During 2017–2018, Code Geass launched three theatrical recap movies in Japan (October 21, February 10, and May 26, respectively), across 79 theaters. The first part, The Awakening Path, grossed ¥67,954,086.40 opening night, rising to number #8 on the charts. The Rebellion Path grossed ¥57,241,203.20 during its opening premiere, ranking #7 on the charts. The Imperial Path grossed ¥67,864,834,800 on its opening day and debuted at #8 on the charts. The film trilogy grossed a total of ¥647,802,700 in Japan.

=== Accolades ===
Code Geass: Lelouch of the Rebellion has garnered numerous awards and accolades since its premiere. At the sixth annual Tokyo Anime Awards held at the 2007 Tokyo International Anime Fair, Code Geass won the best anime television series award. The second season also won the award for "Best Screenplay" at the 2009 Tokyo Anime Fair. In noted Japanese anime magazine Animage's 29th Annual Anime Grand Prix, Code Geass won the most popular series award, with Lelouch Lamperouge also being chosen as the most popular male character and "Colors" being chosen as the most popular song. At the 30th Annual Anime Grand Prix, Lelouch won first place again, and C.C. was voted the most popular female character. At the first Seiyu Awards held in 2007, Jun Fukuyama won the award for best voice actor in a leading role for his performance as Lelouch Lamperouge in the series, while Ami Koshimizu won the award for best voice actress in a supporting role for her performance as Kallen Stadtfeld.

Furthermore, Code Geass won the award for Best TV Animation at the twelfth Animation Kobe event, held annually in Kobe, Hyōgo Prefecture, with R2 taking the award the following year. In the 2009 Seiun Award, Code Geass R2 was a nominee in the category of "Best Media Award."
