= Code Geass Lelouch of the Re;surrection =

2019 film by Gorō Taniguchi

- Theatrical release poster
- Japanese: コードギアス 復活のルルーシュ
- Revised Hepburn: Kōdo Giasu Fukkatsu no Rurūshu
- Directed by: Gorō Taniguchi
- Screenplay by: Ichirō Ōkouchi
- Based on: Code Geass by Gorō Taniguchi and Ichirō Ōkouchi
- Produced by: Jun Yukawa; Yoshimasa Tsuchiya
- Starring: Jun Fukuyama; Yukana; Takahiro Sakurai; Ami Koshimizu; Ayumu Murase; Nobunaga Shimazaki; Wataru Takagi; Keiko Toda
- Cinematography: Hiroyuki Chiba
- Edited by: Seiji Morita
- Music by: Kōtarō Nakagawa
- Production company: Sunrise
- Distributed by: Showgate
- Release date: February 9, 2019
- Running time: 114 minutes
- Country: Japan
- Language: Japanese
- Box office: $9 million

Code Geass Lelouch of the Re;surrection (Japanese: コードギアス 復活のルルーシュ, Hepburn: Kōdo Giasu Fukkatsu no Rurūshu) is a 2019 Japanese animated science fantasy action film based on the Code Geass franchise by Gorō Taniguchi and Ichirō Ōkouchi, who also directed and wrote the film. Produced by Sunrise and distributed by Showgate, Lelouch of the Re;surrection takes place in the continuation of the series that was first depicted in the three-part compilation film: Initiation, Transgression, and Glorification, which was released between 2017 and 2018, and serves as a direct sequel to the events of the three-part film. The film stars Jun Fukuyama as the voice of Lelouch Lamperouge, alongside Yukana, Takahiro Sakurai, Ami Koshimizu, Ayumu Murase, Nobunaga Shimazaki, Wataru Takagi and Keiko Toda. Lelouch of the Re;surrection was released in Japan on February 9, 2019.

Lelouch of the Re;surrection has been licensed by Funimation and it had a limited theatrical release in the United States and Canada on May 5, 2019. A six-volume manga adaptation by Kōjirō Taniguchi and Tomofumi Ogasawara was serialized on the Comic Newtype website between 2020 and 2025. A sequel four-part film series, Code Geass: Rozé of the Recapture was released in 2024.

== Plot ==
A year has passed since the events of the "Zero Requiem", a scheme Emperor Lelouch vi Britannia formulated to end conflict with his death, and Nunnally vi Britannia rules Britannia while aided by her bodyguard Suzaku Kururugi, who has taken the identity of Zero. Nunnally and Suzaku are in the middle of a goodwill visit to a desert nation when they are ambushed by a Knightmare squad; Suzaku is easily defeated and they are abducted. The two find themselves in the custody of Shalio and Shamna, the sibling rulers of the Kingdom of Zilkhistan which has suffered from the world peace crippling their primary export: mercenary soldiers. Shamna explains their plan to use Nunnally to access the collective unconsciousness within C's World to restore Zilkhistan's political might.

Suspecting Zilkhistan's involvement, Kallen Stadtfeld, Sayoko Shinozaki, and Lloyd Asplund infiltrate the country and run into C.C. and a physically revived but soulless Lelouch. C.C. explains that, after the Zero Requiem, their school friend Shirley Fenette smuggled Lelouch's corpse to her and that she revived Lelouch from the dead by reconstructing his corpse, but his memories and personality are trapped in the collective unconsciousness. The group launches an assault on a Zilkhistan prison, where they rescue Suzaku and discover an Aramu Gate, a portal to C's World. C.C. uses the portal to fully revive Lelouch. Lelouch once again dons the mantle of Zero and meets up with Britannian forces led by his half-sister Cornelia li Britannia and his former lieutenant Kaname Ohgi.

Lelouch's forces track Nunnally down and find her in a Zilkhistan temple. Lelouch infiltrates the temple and kills Shamna, but she activates her Geass and travels back six hours in the past, allowing her to perfectly predict Lelouch's actions. Lelouch uses his tactical prowess to deduce the mechanics of Shamna's Geass and knocks her out. He frees Nunnally, but learns that her mind has been transported into C's World. C.C. guides him into the collective unconsciousness, and he successfully rescues Nunnally. Suzaku kills Shalio in combat, destroying Shamna permanently. In the aftermath, Lelouch once again bequeaths the title of Zero to Suzaku and departs on a journey with C.C., taking the alias L.L. as his idea of a marriage proposal.

In a post-credits scene set in an undetermined future, L.L. and C.C. are shown standing over a mass grave in a forest, with L.L. stating he would take away the Geass of those who wield it without resolve. This post-credit scene served as the setup for the movie's picture drama where Lelouch and C.C. confronted a pirate and C.C. took away his Geass.

== Voice cast ==
Characters	Japanese	English
Lelouch Lamperouge/Zero	Jun Fukuyama	Johnny Yong Bosch
C.C.	Yukana	Kate Higgins
Suzaku Kururugi	Takahiro Sakurai	Yuri Lowenthal
Kallen Kouzuki	Ami Koshimizu	Karen Strassman
Shalio	Ayumu Murase	Jared S. Gilmore
Shesthaal Forgner	Nobunaga Shimazaki	Rich Sommer
Belq Batoum Bitool	Wataru Takagi	Christopher Sabat
Shamna	Keiko Toda	Elizabeth Maxwell
Volvona Forgner	Akio Otsuka	Patrick Seitz
Swaile Qujappat	Kenjiro Tsuda	Gabe Kunda
Nunnally vi Britannia	Kaori Nazuka	Rebecca Forstadt
Lloyd Asplund	Tetsu Shiratori	Liam O'Brien
Nina Einstein	Saeko Chiba	Kim Mai Guest
Sayoko Shinozaki	Satomi Arai	Kim Mai Guest

== Production ==
In November 2016, the sequel project was announced on Code Geass's 10th anniversary event with the three-part compilation film project. In August 2018, it was announced that the sequel is a film project. The key members from the television series and the three-part compilation films returned for the sequel film, with director Gorō Taniguchi directing the film, Ichirō Ōkouchi providing the screenplay, manga artist group CLAMP providing character designs with Takahiro Kimura adapting the designs for animation, and Kōtarō Nakagawa and Hitomi Kuroishi composing the music for the film. Taniguchi and Ōkouchi confirmed that the sequel film takes place after the events of the three-part compilation film which serve now as canon for the story.

== Release ==
The film was released in theaters in Japan on February 9, 2019. Funimation licensed the film, and had a limited theatrical release in the United States and Canada on May 5, 2019.

== Reception ==
=== Box office ===
The film debuted at number five with an opening weekend gross of ¥287 million in Japan. It was number six in its second weekend, with a cumulative gross of ¥530 million up until then. As of March 2019, the film has grossed more than ¥1 billion ($9 million) in Japan. Collectively, the Code Geass film franchise has grossed ¥1,899,872,257 ($12,842,594) at the Japanese box office.

=== Critical reception ===
Richard Eisenbeis of Anime News Network gave the film "B" rating, and states "At the very least, this film can be completely ignored with impunity thanks to its built in loophole; the whole thing takes place in the film canon, not the TV series timeline. Therefore, the Code Geass you know and love remains the same as it's been since it finished airing a decade ago, and fans can see these events as just a tantalizing 'what if' if they're not to your liking." even if the author stated those films as a conclusion for the original story.

== Related media ==
=== Manga ===
A six-volume manga adaptation written by Kōjirō Taniguchi and illustrated by Tomofumi Ogasawara, serialized on the Comic Newtype website from 2020 to 2025. Described as the "definitive" Code Geass manga, it dedicates its first volume to an original prequel storyline before adapting the events of the film from the second volume onward, incorporating additional scenes and material. The adaptation follows the television series continuity rather than that of the compilation film trilogy, retaining Shirley's death.

== Sequel ==
A sequel four-part film, Code Geass: Rozé of the Recapture was released in 2024; it was released theatrically in Japan from May through August, and streamed internationally by Disney+ streaming service's Hulu and Star content hub on June 21, 2024, as a 12-episode series format.
