= Another Century's Episode: R =

2010 video game

- Developer: FromSoftware
- Publisher: Banpresto
- Director: Tomohiro Shibuya
- Producer: Takenobu Terada
- Composer: Yoshikazu Takayama
- Series: Another Century's Episode
- Platform: PlayStation 3
- Release: JP: August 19, 2010
- Genre: Third-person shooter
- Mode: Single-player

Another Century's Episode: R (Note: Japanese: アナザーセンチュリーズエピソード アール, Hepburn: Anazā Senchurīzu Episōdo R) is a 2010 third-person shooter video game published by Namco Bandai Games in Japan for the PlayStation 3. It is the fourth entry in the Another Century's Episode series, following Another Century's Episode 3: The Final (2007). The player controls a mech from one of thirteen different anime robot franchises through a series of missions, ranging from destroying enemy machines to protecting a specific target.

The development of R was handled by FromSoftware, a Japanese developer known for the Armored Core and Dark Souls franchises. Series publisher Banpresto had been reorganized into a toy company prior to its release and no longer released video games, though it was given control over the project's direction. Banpresto enlisted the help of the Super Robot Wars development team to work on the game, and incorporated music by the progressive rock group Acid Black Cherry.

Though it was a commercial success and is the best-selling entry in the Another Century's Episode series, R received largely mediocre reviews, having been described as "a functional mess". Critics disliked its overhaul to the gameplay, which they believed made it inferior to previous installments, as well as the controls for being imprecise and unresponsive at times. It was followed by Another Century's Episode Portable in 2011.

== Gameplay ==
The player locking onto an enemy

Another Century's Episode: R is a third-person shooter video game. Players pilot a mecha from one of thirteen different anime series, each possessing their own unique weapon load-outs and attack styles. Represented series include Mobile Suit Gundam: Char's Counterattack, Full Metal Panic!, Macross Zero and Genesis of Aquarion. There are also mechas from other video game franchises, such as Armored Core and Super Robot Wars, in addition to mechas created specifically for this game. Players use these mechas to complete various mission objectives, which increase in difficulty as the player progresses. Objectives range from destroying waves of enemy mechas to protecting a specified target from opposing forces.

Mechas can no longer dash like in previous installments; instead, they are able to "boost" in order to cover distances quickly. Weapons cannot be fired while boosting, requiring the player to time their movements. Destroying enemies fills a portion of a meter known as the "tension gauge", which when full can be used to launch powerful superweapons. There are also "support attacks" that allow mechas to perform one of several abilities in battle, at the cost of a fraction of their health. These include filling the tension gauge to max level, healing the player's mecha, and more powerful attacks to defeat larger enemies. At the end of most stages, the player engages in "Chase Mode", where the mecha moves along a pre-set movement path and players instead controls the targeting receptacles to defeat the end-stage boss.

== Plot ==
The plot of Another Century's Episode: R revolves around an original timeline created specifically for the game, as opposed to linking the stories from each of the represented series. In this timeline, humanity has expanded beyond the Solar System, with planet Area becoming one of those resulting colonies. Androids known as Seasons were originally built to help the colonists settling on Area, but later rebelled against their human creators. Leading a robotic army collectively known as the Icon, the Seasons successfully wipe out the human population on Area, but there is one last trick up the colonists' sleeves: they made a data copy out of one of the Seasons androids and entrusted it, named Autumn-4, with genetic seeds of themselves as well as a trans-atmospheric battleship Ark Alpha. The intention was for Autumn-4 to take the gene seeds as far away from the Seasons' grip as possible so that the now-deceased colonists can be reborn on a safe world. Soon after the commencement of Autumn-4's mission, however, Ark Alpha was intercepted by a fleet of Icon warships led by Winter-1, head of the Seasons.

Overwhelmed by the numerically superior enemies and in desperation, Autumn-4 activated a device within Ark Alpha called V-Drive, which has the ability to create a black-hole-like portal to parallel universes: it worked, with Brunhilde emerging from the portal and repulsing the Icon fleet, but also unintentionally caused characters from other timelines to be transported to planet Area as well. To make the matter worse, the energy discharged by Brunhilde in the process affected Autumn-4's memory circuits and corrupted her record of the event, leaving her unable to explain to all the people who now find themselves stranded in a foreign universe. Nevertheless, feeling responsible for their plight, Autumn-4 decides to find out what happened and how to return them to their homeworlds while enlisting their help in finding a way through the robotic army of the Seasons, who would shoot first and never ask questions much later.

== Development and release ==
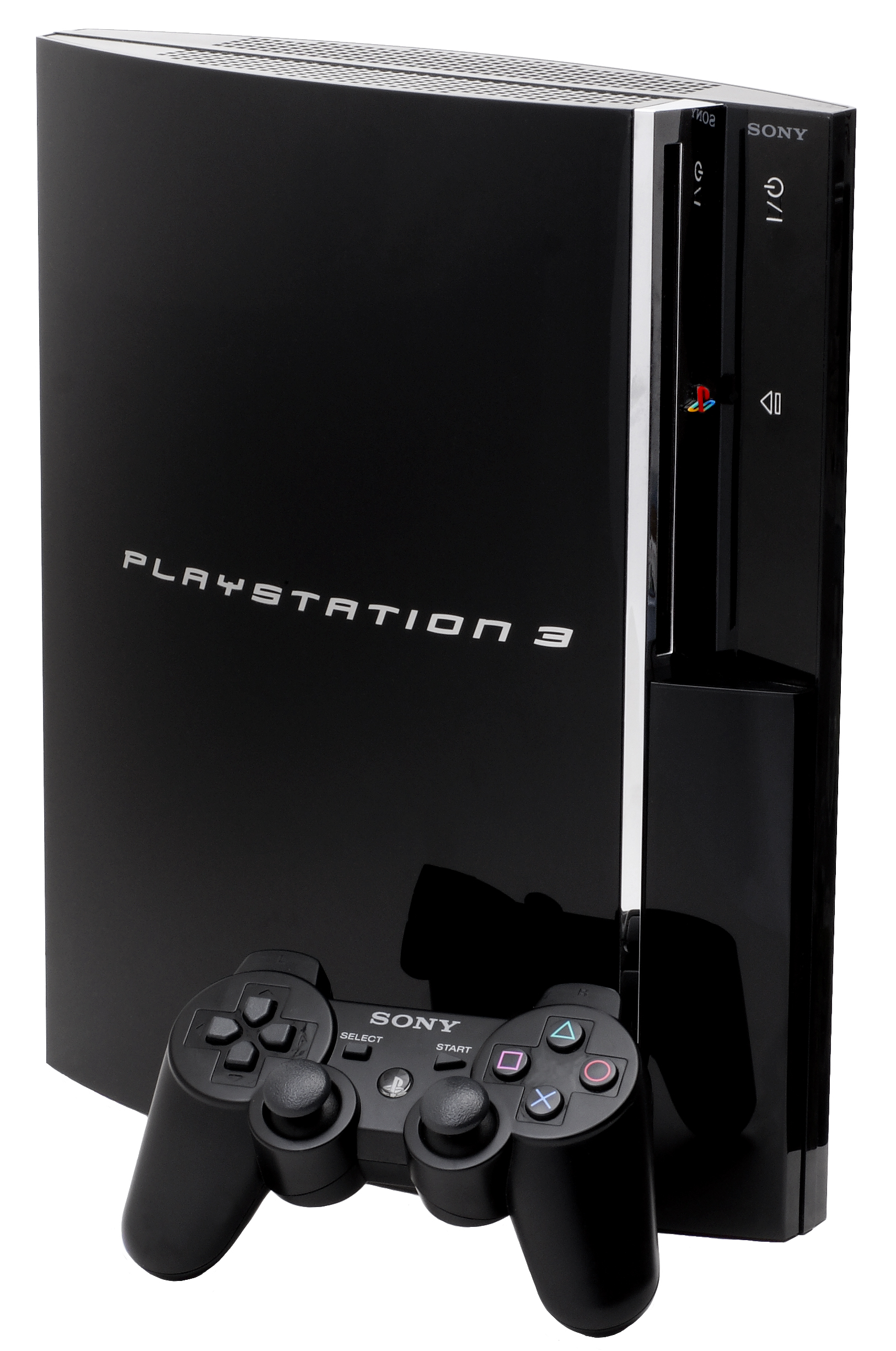
The hardware of the PlayStation 3 allowed the game to have more detailed graphics and visual effects.

Another Century's Episode: R was developed by FromSoftware, a company known for the Armored Core and Dark Souls franchises. FromSoftware intended for Another Century's Episode 3: The Final (2007) for the PlayStation 2 to be the last installment but was contracted to create another entry for the PlayStation 3. Banpresto, the publisher for the series up to that point, was absorbed into Namco Bandai Games in 2008 and reorganized into a manufacturer of toys and merchandiser machines. Though this second iteration of Banpresto no longer published video games, it worked alongside FromSoftware during the production of Another Century's Episode: R. Banpresto enlisted the help of the production team behind the Super Robot Wars series, including producer Takenobu Terada, to assist with the project. The team made several alternations and additions to the gameplay in order to make it more in line with Super Robot Wars, such as making it story-driven and taking place in a universe created specifically for the game. The hardware of the PlayStation 3 allowed for more detailed graphics and visual effects.

The opening and ending themes were performed by the progressive rock group Acid Black Cherry and its lead vocalist, Yasu. He had shown interest in creating music for the series even though the opening songs were sung by women. Yasu was given full creative freedom over the music and attempted to replicate the style of music used in super robot anime series based on his past experience with watching them. Several of the lyrics are based on negative experiences in his personal life at the time, and used this to help convey the idea of fighting against your problems.

Namco Bandai Games announced Another Century's Episode: R in April 2010. The game was released in Japan on August 19, published under the Banpresto brand. A strategy guide by Enterbrain was produced to coincide with its release. Acid Black Cherry published two soundtrack albums later in the year, which contain music from the game and original tracks created specifically for the albums.

The game's website went live online on April 13, 2010.

== Reception ==
Reception

Review scores
Publication	Score
Famitsu	33/40
Mecha Damashii	5/10

Another Century's Episode: R was a commercial success. During its first week on the market, it sold 187,661 copies—higher than previous installments in the series. By September, it was the fourth highest-selling video game in Japan, behind Monster Hunter Diary, Ace Combat X2: Joint Assault, and Wii Party. R sold 245,301 copies by the end of 2010 and was ranked among the year's 50 top-selling games in Japan. As of 2012, the game has sold 260,078 copies, making the best-selling game in the Another Century's Episode series.

Four reviewers from Famitsu enjoyed the game's sense of speed and exhilaration. One complimented the higher production value for making it feel like an anime, while another believed the missions lacked enough variety and became monotonous after a while. Three of the reviewers agreed that R featured a nice roster of mechas that were unique in their appearance and weapon selection. Mecha Damashii writer Ollie Bardner felt otherwise, believing it was inferior to the previous three installments. He was particularly critical of Banpresto's decision to alter and omit several of the series' ideas, which he described as being "some such mind numbingly stupid corporate agenda". Barder further criticized the controls for feeling inferior to other similar games, its usage of grinding, and its poorly-animated and unskippable cutscenes. He concluded by saying: "Overall then the game is a functional mess and whilst playable it's not really enjoyable as the overt restrictions make it very frustrating – simply because you never truly feel in control of the mecha you've selected."

In a 2012 retrospective on the series, Arshad Abdul-Aal of Hardcore Gaming 101 shared many of Bardner's complaints. He felt that R's biggest problem was letting Banpresto be more "hands-on" with its production, as it led to what he considered to be poor design choices. Abdul-Aal called the game "a neutred dog", and a sequel that omitted many of the mechanics and concepts he believed made the earlier Another Century's Episode titles so fun to play.
