= Ichirō Ōkouchi =

Japanese screenwriter and novelist

- Born: 28 March 1968 (age 58); Sendai, Miyagi Prefecture, Japan
- Occupations: Screenwriter, novelist
- Known for: Devilman Crybaby, Code Geass

Ichirō Ōkouchi (大河内 一楼, Ōkouchi Ichirō; born 28 March 1968) is a Japanese screenwriter and novelist. He is a graduate of the School of Human Sciences in Waseda University.

Ōkouchi is best known for collaborating with director Gorō Taniguchi for composing the story and script of the Sunrise original production, Code Geass: Lelouch of the Rebellion in 2006 and its sequel Code Geass: Lelouch of the Rebellion R2 in 2008.

== Storytelling philosophy ==
In a May 2026 interview, Ōkouchi discussed his screenwriting philosophy, noting that he prioritizes the "emotional gray areas" of his characters to keep the audience engaged. He emphasized that in series like Code Geass, the political conflict serves as a backdrop to the personal growth and moral dilemmas of the protagonists.

== Works ==
=== Anime television series ===
- Turn A Gundam (Episodic screenplay; 1999–2000)
- Angelic Layer (Series composition, screenplay; 2001)
- Project ARMS (Episodic screenplay; 2001)
- Overman King Gainer (Series composition, screenplay; 2002)
- Azumanga Daioh (Series composition, screenplay; 2002)
- RahXephon (Episodic screenplay; 2002)
- Wolf's Rain (Episodic screenplay; 2003)
- Stellvia (Episodic screenplay; 2003)
- Planetes (Series composition, screenplay; 2003–2004)
- Mahou Sensei Negima! (Series composition, screenplay; 2005)
- Eureka Seven (Episodic screenplay; 2005)
- Code Geass: Lelouch of the Rebellion (Original story, series composition, screenplay; 2006–2007)
- Code Geass: Lelouch of the Rebellion R2 (Original story, series composition, screenplay; 2008)
- Shigofumi: Letters from the Departed (Series composition, screenplay; 2008)
- Guilty Crown (Assistant series composition, episodic screenplay; 2011–2012)
- Valvrave the Liberator (Series composition, screenplay; 2013)
- M3: The Dark Metal (Episodic screenplay; 2014)
- Space Dandy (Screenplay for Episode 5; 2014)
- Black Butler: Book of Circus (2014)
- Comet Lucifer (Episodic screenplay; 2015)
- Heavy Object (Episodic screenplay; 2015–2016)
- Kabaneri of the Iron Fortress (Series composition, screenplay; 2016)
- Princess Principal (Series composition, screenplay for Episodes 1 to 10; 2017)
- Devilman Crybaby (Series composition, screenplay; 2018)
- Hakumei and Mikochi (Screenplay for Episodes 4 and 7; 2018)
- Lupin the Third Part 5 (Series composition, screenplay; 2018)
- SK8 the Infinity (Series composition; 2021–present)
- Mobile Suit Gundam: The Witch from Mercury (Series composition, screenplay; 2022)
- Spy × Family: Season 2 (Series composition, screenplay; 2023)
- Kaiju No. 8 (Series composition, screenplay; 2024)
- Grendizer U (Series composition, screenplay; 2024)
- You and Idol Precure (Screenplay; 2025)

=== Anime films ===
- Brave Story (2006)
- Magic Tree House (2011)
- Berserk: The Golden Age Arc
  - I: The Egg of the King (2012)
  - II: The Battle for Doldrey (2012)
  - III: The Advent (2013)
- Code Geass: Lelouch of the Rebellion
  - I: Initiation (2017)
  - II: Transgression (2018)
  - III: Glorification (2018)
- Code Geass Lelouch of the Re;surrection (2019)
- Fuse Teppō Musume no Torimonochō (2019)
- Seven Days War (2019)
- Sing a Bit of Harmony (Co-writer; 2021)
- Spy × Family Code: White (2023)

=== OVA ===
- The 08th MS Team: Battle in Three Dimensions (2013)
- SK8 the Infinity Extra Part (2025)

=== ONA ===
- Lupin Zero (2022)

=== Novels ===
- Revolutionary Girl Utena 1: Ao no Sōjo (1998)
- Revolutionary Girl Utena 2: Midori no Omoi (1998)
- Martian Successor Nadesico: Ruri no Kōkai Nisshi (1998)
- Martian Successor Nadesico: Channel ha Ruriruri De (1998)
- Martian Successor Nadesico: Ruri A Kara B he no Monogatari (1999)
- Mobile Suit Gundam: The 08th MS Team (1999)
- Cyber Team in Akihabara: Tsubame Hatsu Taiken!? Club Katsudō Sentō Chū (1999)
- Starbows (2001)
- A Little Snow Fairy Sugar (2002)
- Code Geass: Oz of the Reflection (2012)
