= Another Century's Episode Portable =

2011 video game

- Developer: FromSoftware
- Publisher: Namco Bandai Games (Note: Released under the Banpresto brand)
- Series: Another Century's Episode
- Platform: PlayStation Portable
- Release: JP: January 13, 2011
- Genre: Third-person shooter
- Modes: Single-player, multiplayer

Another Century's Episode Portable (Note: Japanese: アナザーセンチュリーズエピソード ポータブル) is a mecha action video game developed by FromSoftware and published by Namco Bandai Games. It was released for the PlayStation Portable on January 13, 2011.

== Gameplay ==
The player locking onto an enemy

Another Century's Episode Portable is a third-person shooter video game. Players pilot a mecha from one of 20 different anime series, each posing their own unique weapon load-outs and attack styles. Represented series include Mobile Suit Gundam 00, Macross F, and Aura Battler Dunbine, in addition to original mechas created specifically for the game. Players use these mechas to complete various mission objectives, which increase in difficulty as the player progresses. Objectives range from destroying waves of enemy mechas to protecting a specified target from opposing forces. An online multiplayer mode allows multiple players to complete these missions together. Portable is presented in a more linear format than previous installments, focusing on completing missions as efficiently as possible and lacking a plot.

Mechas can boost, or "dash", themselves forward. Dashing allows players to avoid being hit by enemy projectiles and obstacles, though this drains the gauge meter and must recharge before it can be used again. Mechas can carry a variety of weapons, such as machine guns, lock-on missiles, and other firearms, with them into battle. Most of these weapons have ammo that depletes when used, which can be reloaded by moving over resupply points placed throughout each mission. Locking onto enemies allows players to perform a "combination" attack that deals heavy damage to opponents. Combination attacks can also be used to summon additional mechas and activating a bullet time effect that deals additional damage for a short while. By destroying powerful enemy grunts and completing missions, players are rewarded with chips that can be used to increase the player's weapons, abilities, and strength.

== Reception ==
Reception

Review scores
Publication	Score
Famitsu	31/40
Mecha Damashii	7/10

On release, Famitsu magazine scored the game a 31 out of 40. Cacophanus from Mecha Damashii ranked the game 7 out of 10, praising the game's visuals but comments its lack of environments and draw distance.

In the week of its release, the game sold 70,217 units and ranked first in sales for any game released that week.
