= George Iida =

Japanese director, screenwriter, manga author and novelist

- 飯田 譲治
- Born: 1 March 1959 (age 67); Suwa, Nagano, Japan
- Occupations: Director, screenwriter, manga author, author
- Years active: 1980–present

George Iida (飯田 譲治, Iida Jōji; born 1 March 1959) is a Japanese film and television director, screenwriter, manga author, and novelist. Iida has worked continually in Japan's film, television, anime and manga industries since the early 1980s, predominantly in the genres of horror and science fiction.

== Career ==
Iida was first discovered when his 8mm short Intermission (Kyukei) was screened at the 1980 PIA Film Festival. For the next few years, Iida found work alternating as a scriptwriter for pink films and as an assistant director for other productions. He was subsequently given the opportunity to direct his own project, the straight-to-video production Cyclops (1987). Iida soon followed this with his theatrical debut, Battle Heater (1989), a horror comedy about a man-eating kotatsu that terrorizes the tenants of a rundown apartment block.

In the 1990s Iida branched out into television, creating the series Night Head (1992–1993), which would go on to spawn an entire franchise including a made-for-TV movie of the same name in 1994 as well as manga and books. An anime series, Night Head Genesis, was subsequently produced in 2006. Other notable productions include the 1998 Spiral, the original sequel to Hideo Nakata's film Ring (before Nakata directed the better known, separate work Ring 2 in 1999), and the police procedural/horror Another Heaven (2000). Spiral was based on Koji Suzuki's second novel of his Ring Trilogy of the same name, also known as Rasen. Another Heaven was based on one of Iida's own books.

Iida's most recent theatrical production as director was Dragon Head (2003), a live-action adaptation of the manga series by Minetaro Mochizuki.

== Filmography ==
=== Film ===
- Cyclops (1987)
- Battle Heater (1989)
- Tokyo Babylon 1999 (1993) – Live-action feature film adaptation of the manga series.
- Akagi (1995) (as producer) – The first of two feature film adaptations of the manga of the same name.
- Spiral (1998)
- Another Heaven (2000)
- Jam Films (2002) – Segment: Cold Sleep.
- Dragon Head (2003)
- Black Belt (2007) (as writer)

=== Television ===
- Tales of the Unusual (1992) (2 episodes)
- Night Head (1992–1993)
- Night Head (1994) – TV movie based on the series.
- Ring (1995) (as writer) – TV movie based on the 1991 novel Ring by Koji Suzuki.
- Another Heaven: Eclipse (2000) – TV spin-off series based on Iida's Another Heaven.
- Sci-Fi Harry (2000–2001) – Anime series based on Iida and Asami Tohjoh's manga of the same name.
- Night Head Genesis (2006)
- Strangers 6 (2012)
- Night Head 2041 (2021)

== Other work ==
Iida wrote the storyline for his own video game Iida Joji Nightmare Interactive: Moon Cradle. It was released in 1995 for the 3DO Interactive Multiplayer.
