= Yukana =

Japanese voice actress

- ゆかな
- Born: Yukana Nogami; January 6, 1975 (age 51); Futtsu, Chiba, Japan
- Occupations: Voice actress, singer
- Years active: 1993–present
- Agent: Sigma Seven
- Website: yukana.com

Yukana Nogami (野上 ゆかな, Nogami Yukana; born January 6, 1975), who goes by her mononymous stage name Yukana (ゆかな), is a Japanese voice actress and singer affiliated with Sigma Seven. Her major roles include Yuri Tanima in Wedding Peach, Meiling Li in Cardcaptor Sakura, Tessa in Full Metal Panic!, Honoka Yukishiro (Cure White) in Futari wa Pretty Cure, Ulrike in Kyo Kara Maoh!, Yumiko Tomi in Fafner in the Azure, C.C. in Code Geass, Cecilia Alcott in Infinite Stratos, Isane Kotetsu in Bleach, and Kale in Dragon Ball Super. In tokusatsu, she voices Mezool in Kamen Rider OOO and Tega June in No.1 Sentai Gozyuger. In video games, she is the voice of Asahi Takashima in Money Idol Exchanger, Tear Grants in Tales of the Abyss, Ai Nanasaki in Amagami SS, Niyon in Granblue Fantasy, Dusk (Xi) in Arknights and Zhiming: Ethereal Enigma in Aether Gazer.

== Biography ==
During her childhood, Yukana was an ill girl who was not expected to live past the age of 20. As she had hoped to leave a mark for her existence, Yukana chose a career in show business and eventually becoming a voice actress. One of her earliest roles as the title character of Azuki-chan left a big impression as she portrayed an elementary school character despite being a student herself at the time of the show's recording.

== Filmography ==
=== Animation ===
List of voice performances in animation
Year	Title	Role	Notes	Source
1993	Crayon Shin-chan	Moemi		
1993	Moldiver	Mirai Ozora	OVA, Debut role, first lead role	
1994	Montana Jones	Nicoletta	TV Debut	
1994	Macross 7	Chitose ripple チトセ・リップル		
1994	Mahōjin Guru Guru	Pudding プリン		
1995	Azuki-chan	Azusa "Azuki" Noyama		
1995	Wedding Peach	Yuri Tanima / Angel Lily		
1995	Ping-Pong Club	Noriko Soma		
1995	Juuni Senshi Bakuretsu Eto Ranger	Mermaid Princess	Episode 25	
1996	Kochira Katsushika-ku Kameari Kōen-mae Hashutsujo	Ai Mari	代役	
1996–97	Birdy the Mighty	Natsumi Hayamiya	OVA	
1997	Night Warriors: Darkstalkers' Revenge	Felicia	OVA	
1997	Fair, then Partly Piggy	Fairy of Spring 春の妖精		
1997	Vampire Princess Miyu	Mole		
1998	Power Dolls Project α	Selma Scheele	OVA Ep. 2 弾バージョン	
1998	Yu-Gi-Oh!	Miho Nosaka		
1998	The Adventures of Mini-Goddess	Nozomi		
1998	Cardcaptor Sakura	Meiling Li		
1998	DT Eightron	Jessica		
1998	Flint the Time Detective	Himiko		
1998–2000	Blue Submarine No. 6	Mayumi Kino	OVA series	
1999	Starship Girl Yamamoto Yohko	Lubrum		
1999	I'm Gonna Be An Angel!	Natsumi Suzuhara		
2000	UFO Baby	Kiwi		
2000	Sci-Fi Harry	Selma Shelley		
2000	Shin Megami Tensei: Devil Children	Mirai Kaname		
2000	Ghost Stories	Shizuko		
2001	Samurai Girl: Real Bout High School	Rumi Kurumiya		
2001–03	Angel Tales	Mika (Rabbit)	Also Chu	
2001	Rave Master	Reina		
2001	Vampiyan Kids	Kyurun		
2002–18	Full Metal Panic! series	Teresa "Tessa" Testarossa		
2002	Aquarian Age: Sign for Evolution	Sarashina		
2002	Chobits	Kotoko		
2002	Pita-Ten	Shia		
2002	The Twelve Kingdoms	Youka		
2002	Samurai Deeper Kyo	Sakuya		
2002	Dragon Drive	Sayaka Towa		
2002	Petite Princess Yucie	Mimi		
2003	Sortie! Machine Robo Rescue	Alice Beckham, Marie Bitou		
2003	Crush Gear Nitro	Arora Shandy (Meena) アロラ・シャンディ（ミーナ）		
2003	Air Master	Mina Nakanotani		
2003	Astro Boy	Roxanne		
2003	Last Exile	Narrator		
2003	Detective School Q	Yuri Higetsu		
2003	Yami to Bōshi to Hon no Tabibito	Lala		
2004	Daphne in the Brilliant Blue	Maia Mizuki		
2004–05	Futari wa Pretty Cure	Honoka Yukishiro (Cure White)	Also Max Heart	
2004–08	Kyo Kara Maoh! series	Ulrike		
2004	Sgt. Frog	Shinano		
2004	Fafner in the Azure: Dead Aggressor	Yumiko Tomi		
2004	Onmyō Taisenki	Momo Jōzenji, Hīragi no Horin		
2004	My-HiME	Fumi Himeno, Mashiro Kazahana		
2005	Bleach	Isane Kotetsu		
2005	MAR	Merillo		
2005	Angel Heart	Souchin		
2005	My-Otome	Mashiro Blan de Windbloom		
2005	Black Cat	Rinslet Walker		
2006	Ayakashi: Samurai Horror Tales	Kayo		
2006	Digimon Savers	Lalamon		
2006	Onegai My Melody: KuruKuru Shuffle!	Saori		
2006	Simoun	Dominura, Elly/Elif		
2006	Bakegyamon	Aki Hino		
2006	Zegapain	Mizuki, Shin		
2006	Ah My Goddess: Flights of Fancy	Nozomi		
2006	Otogi-Jūshi Akazukin	Katejina		
2006–08, 2012–16	Code Geass: Lelouch of the Rebellion series	C.C.		
2006	Kujibiki Unbalance	Kasumi Kisaragi	replaced Ayako Kawasumi	
2006	Hell Girl	Yurie	2nd series	
2006	Fushigiboshi no Futagohime Gyu!	Mary Annarin		
2006	Strain: Strategic Armored Infantry	Lottie Gelh		
2006–07	My-Otome Zwei	Mashiro Blan de Windbloom	OVA	
2006	Digimon Savers: Ultimate Power! Activate Burst Mode	Lalamon		
2007	Magical Girl Lyrical Nanoha StrikerS	Reinforce Zwei, Lucino Liilie リインフォースII 、ルキノ・リリエ		
2007	GeGeGe no Kitaro	Suzuko Kiyotaki	5th TV series	
2007	Heroic Age	Nilval		
2007	Idolmaster: Xenoglossia	Rifa		
2007	Toward the Terra	Maria Singh		
2007	Devil May Cry: The Animated Series	Patty Lowell (adult)		
2007	Mononoke	Kayo, Nomoto Chiyo		
2007	Myself; Yourself	Saeko Wakatsuki		
2007	Mokke	Aki		
2007	Genshiken 2	Kasumi Kisaragi		
2008	Rosario + Vampire	Keito		
2008–09	My-Otome 0: S.ifr	Narrator, Sakura Hazakura	OVA series	
2008–09	The Tower of Druaga series	Succubus		
2008	Zettai Karen Children	Fujiko Tsubomi		
2008	Our Home's Fox Deity	Kūgen Tenko (female)		
2008	Soul Eater	Azusa Yumi		
2008–10	Sekirei series	Kazehana		
2008	Battle Spirits: Shounen Toppa Bashin	J's aunt		
2008	Tales of the Abyss	Tear Grants		
2008	Linebarrels of Iron	Aika Hasegawa		
2009	The Girl Who Leapt Through Space	Takane Shishido		
2009	Inuyasha: The Final Act	Kanna		
2009–10	Kiddy Girl-and	Troisienne		
2009	Flying Trapeze	Midori		
2010	Betrayal Knows My Name	Yuki (Previous Life)		
2010–12	Amagami SS	Ai Nanasaki	Also SS+	
2010	Battle Spirits: Brave	Angers Loche		
2010	Star Driver	Madoka Kei		
2011–13	Infinite Stratos series	Cecilia Alcott		
2011	Dragon Crisis!	Eriko Nanao		
2011	Phi Brain: Puzzle of God	Demon's High Priestess		
2011	Last Exile: Fam, the Silver Wing	Dian, Narrator		
2011	Future Diary	Mao Nonosaka		
2012	Daily Lives of High School Boys	Habara		
2012	Fairy Tail	Michelle Lobster/Imitatia		
2012	Saint Seiya Ω	Gemini Paradox		
2012	Hyōka	Fuyumi Irisu		
2012	One Piece	Shirahoshi	Eps. 532-574	
2012	Tamagotchi! Yume Kira Dream	Himespectchi		
2012	Code:Breaker	Ex-04 Nenene Fujiwara		
2013	Zettai Karen Children: Unlimited Psychic Squad	Fujiko Tsubomi		
2013	Majestic Prince	Lutiel		
2013	Genshiken: Second Season	Kanako Ohno	replaces Ayako Kawasumi	
2013	Hakkenden: Eight Dogs of the East	Kikyo no Hana		
2013	Unbreakable Machine-Doll	Shoko Karyusai		
2013	Arpeggio of Blue Steel	Kongo		
2013	BlazBlue: Alter Memory	Emperor		
2014	Strange+	Nana		
2014–15	Cross Ange	Emma Bronson, Liza Randog, Guid Robo		
2014	Gugure! Kokkuri-san	Tama		
2015	Fafner in the Azure: Exodus	Yumiko Tomi		
2015	Magical Girl Lyrical Nanoha ViVid	Reinforce Zwei		
2015	Blood Blockade Battlefront	Emma Macbeth		
2015	Gate	Mizuki Kohara		
2016	Divine Gate	Operator, System voice		
2016	Luck & Logic	Succubus		
2017	Dragon Ball Super	Kale		
2018	Cardcaptor Sakura: Clear Card	Meiling Li		
2018	Hug! Pretty Cure	Honoka Yukishiro (Cure White)	Eps. 22, 37	
2019	Radiant Season 2	Queen Boudica		
2019	Super Shiro	Bibo		
2020	Toilet-Bound Hanako-kun	Yako (The Misaki Stairs)		
2020	The 8th Son? Are You Kidding Me?	Amalie		
2020	Listeners	Lisa		
2020	Monster Girl Doctor	Cthulhy Squele		
2022	Smile of the Arsnotoria the Animation	Solо̄		
2023	Helck	Witch		
2023	Power of Hope: PreCure Full Bloom	Honoka Yukishiro (Cure White)	Eps. 11-12	
2024	Oshi no Ko	Anemone Monemone		
2024	Mission: Yozakura Family	Tsubomi Yozakura		
2026	Chained Soldier 2	Fubuki Azuma		
2026	Draw This, Then Die!	Hana Kongōji		
2026	Magical Girl Lyrical Nanoha Exceeds Gun Blaze Vengeance	Rein Yagami		
2026	The World's Strongest Witch	Elhaur		

=== Tokusatsu ===
List of voice performances in tokusatsu
Year	Title	Role	Notes	Source
2010	Tensou Sentai Goseiger	Busuwa Alien Irian of the Queen Bee	Episode 9	
2010–11	Kamen Rider OOO	Mezool	Episodes 1-16, 36-45	
2010	Kamen Rider × Kamen Rider OOO & W Featuring Skull: Movie War Core	Mezool	Movie	
2011	Kamen Rider OOO Wonderful: The Shogun and the 21 Core Medals	Mezool	Movie	
2022	Kamen Rider OOO 10th: Core Medal of Resurrection	Mezool	V-Cinema	
2025–26	No.1 Sentai Gozyuger	Tega June	Episodes 2, 4, 6, 8, 10, 12, 15-17, 20, 23, 25, 27-28, 32-34, 37-38, 41-44, 46-49	
2025	No.1 Sentai Gozyuger: TegaSword of Resurrection	Tega June	Movie	

=== Films ===
List of voice performances in film
Year	Title	Role	Notes	Source
1996	X	Nekoi Yuzuriha		
1999	Cardcaptor Sakura: The Movie	Meiling Li		
2000	Leave it to Kero-chan!	Meiling Li	short film before feature	
2000	Cardcaptor Sakura Movie 2: The Sealed Card	Meiling Li		
2002	Inuyasha the Movie: The Castle Beyond the Looking Glass	Kanna		
2005	Futari wa Pretty Cure Max Heart the Movie	Honoka Yukishiro (Cure White)		
2005	Mobile Suit Zeta Gundam: A New Translation	Four Murasame	2nd and 3rd film, replaces Saeko Shimazu	
2005	Futari wa Pretty Cure Max Heart the Movie 2: Friends of the Snow-Laden Sky	Honoka Yukishiro (Cure White)		
2005	Black Jack: The Two Doctors of Darkness	Rock (female disguise)		
2006	Digimon Savers The Movie: Ultimate Power! Burst Mode Invoke!!	Lalamon		
2007	Crayon Shin-chan: The Storm Called: The Singing Buttocks Bomb	Urara		
2007	Summer Days with Coo	Idla		
2007	Bleach: The DiamondDust Rebellion	Isane Kotetsu, Yang		
2009	Pretty Cure All Stars DX: Everyone's Friends - the Collection of Miracles!	Honoka Yukishiro (Cure White)		
2010	Pretty Cure All Stars DX2: Light of Hope - Protect the Rainbow Jewel!	Honoka Yukishiro (Cure White)		
2010	Time of Eve	Akiko		
2010	Fafner:Heaven and Earth	Yumiko Tomi		
2011	Pretty Cure All Stars DX3: Deliver the Future! The Rainbow-Colored Flower That Connects the World	Honoka Yukishiro (Cure White)		
2012	Magical Girl Lyrical Nanoha The MOVIE 2nd A's	Reinforce Zwei		
2013	Pretty Cure All Stars New Stage 2: Friends of the Heart	Honoka Yukishiro (Cure White)		
2014	Pretty Cure All Stars New Stage 3: Eternal Friends	Honoka Yukishiro (Cure White)		
2015	Pretty Cure All Stars: Spring Carnival	Honoka Yukishiro (Cure White)		
2015	Detective Conan: Sunflowers of Inferno	Kumiko Kishi		
2015	Arpeggio of Blue Steel: Ars Nova Cadenza	Kongo		
2016	Pretty Cure All Stars: Singing with Everyone♪ Miraculous Magic!	Honoka Yukishiro (Cure White)		
2017	Magical Girl Lyrical Nanoha Reflection	Reinforce Zwei		
2017–18	Code Geass Lelouch of the Rebellion	C.C.	Three-part compilation film, New dialogues recorded	
2018	Hug! Pretty Cure Futari wa Pretty Cure: All Stars Memories	Honoka Yukishiro (Cure White)		
2019	Pretty Cure Miracle Universe	Honoka Yukishiro (Cure White)		
2019	Code Geass Lelouch of the Re;surrection	C.C.		
2023	Pretty Cure All Stars F	Honoka Yukishiro (Cure White)		
2024	Mononoke the Movie: Phantom in the Rain	Mugitani		
2024	Code Geass: Rozé of the Recapture	C.C.	Four-part film series	
2025	Mononoke the Movie: The Ashes of Rage	Sayo		

=== Drama CD ===
List of voice performances in audio recordings
Year	Title	Role	Notes	Source
1997	Power Dolls Wedding March	Selma Scheele		
2005	Fullmetal Alchemist Vol. 3: Criminal Our Scars 鋼の錬金術師 Vol.3 咎人たちの傷跡	Lina		
2015	7th Dragon 2020 & 2020-II: Tokyo Chronicle	Neko		

=== Video games ===
List of voice performances in video games
Year	Title	Role	Notes	Source
1994	Advanced V.G.	Yuka Takeuchi	PS1/Sega Saturn/Turbo CD	
1994	Power Dolls 2	Thelma Schele	PS1	
1997	Tengai Makyō: Daiyon no Mokushiroku	Darkness lover Candy	Sega Saturn, also 2006 remake	
1997	Money Puzzle Exchanger	Asahi Takashima/Debtmiser	Neo Geo MVS	
1998	Advanced V.G. 2	Yuka Takeuchi	PS	
1998	Atelier Elie: The Alchemist of Salburg 2	Louise Lawrencium	PS1/PS2	
1998	Ehrgeiz	Claire Andrews クレア・アンドリュース	PS1/PS2	
2000	Blue Submarine No. 6 Antarctica	Mayumi Noriyuki	PS1/PS2	
2001	Summon Night 2	Hasaha, Pafferu	PS	
2002	Rave Master: Unfinished secret stone	Reina	PS1/PS2	
2003	Summon Night 3	Kiyupi, Hazel, Hasaha, Pafferu		
2004	Inuyasha	Kanna	PS1/PS2	
2004	Berserk: Millennium Falcon Hen Seima Senki no Shō	Schierke	PS1/PS2	
2004–06	Magna Carta: Crimson Stigmata	Eonisu Milan	PS1/PS2 also Portable in 2006	
2004–05	Futari wa Pretty Cure games	Honoka Yukishiro (Cure White)		
2005–06	My-Hime games	Fumi Himeno		
2005	Tales of the Abyss	Tear Grants	PS1/PS2	
2006	Onimusha: Dawn of Dreams	Akane "Jubei" Yagyū	PS1/PS2	
2006	Black Cat	Rinslet Walker	PS1/PS2	
2006	School Rumble	Tatyana	PS1/PS2	
2006	Tokimeki Memorial Girl's Side: 2nd Kiss	Shiho Arisawa	PS1/PS2	
2006	Digimon World Data Squad	Lalamon	PS2	
2006	Tales of the World: Radiant Mythology	Tear Grants	PSP	
2007	Kujibiki Unbalance	Kasumi Kisaragi	PS1/PS2	
2007	Tales of Fandom Vol.2	Tear Grants	PS1/PS2	
2008	Code Geass: Lelouch of the Rebellion: Lost Colors	C.C.	PS	
2008	Super Robot Taisen OG Saga: Endless Frontier	Kaguya Nanbu	DS	
2008	Zettai Karen Children DS: Dai-4 no Children	Fujiko Tsubomimi	DS	
2009	Tales of the World: Radiant Mythology 2	Tear Grants	PSP	
2009	Amagami	Ai Nanasaki	PS2	
2009	Arc Rise Fantasia	Aries	Wii	
2009	Tales of VS	Tear Grants	PSP	
2010	Ar Tonelico Qoga	Richaryosha	PS3	
2010	Resonance of Fate	Rebecca	PS3	
2010	Abyss of the Sacrifice	Chloe	PSP	
2010	Super Robot Taisen OG Saga: Endless Frontier EXCEED	Kaguya Nanbu	DS	
2010	No Fate! Only the Power of Will	Shiina Lycee 椎名理瀬	PSP	
2010	Tenshin Ranman - Happy Go Lucky!!	Shikine 宍姫 life 市杵宍姫命	PSP	
2010	Another Century's Episode: R	Teresa Testarossa, C.C.	PS3	
2011	Another Century's Episode Portable	Four Murasame	PSP	
2011	Tales of the World: Radiant Mythology 3	Tear Grants	PSP	
2011	EbiKore+ Amagami	Ai Nanasaki	Also 2014 edition	
2011	7th Dragon 2020	Neko, Unit 13	PSP	
2012	Resident Evil: Operation Raccoon City	Four Eyes		
2012	Corpse Party	Takai Azusa	Also Blood Drive in 2014	
2012	Project X Zone	Nanbu Kaguya	DS	
2012	Time and Eternity	Regio	PS3	
2013	Super Robot Wars Operation Extend	C.C.	PSP	
2013	The Legend of Heroes: Trails of Cold Steel	Sharon Kruger		
2013	7th Dragon 2020-II	Neko, Unit 13	PSP	
2014	Super Heroine Chronicle	Cecilia Alcott		
2014	Infinite Stratos 2: Ignition Hearts	Cecilia Alcott		
2014	The Legend of Heroes: Trails of Cold Steel	Sharon Kruger		
2014	Tales of the World: Reve Unitia	Tear Grants	DS	
2014	Granblue Fantasy	Niyon	Android, iOS, Browser	
2015	Cross Ange tr.	Emma Bronson		
2015	Luminous Arc Infinity	Violet	Other	
2015	Infinite Stratos 2: Love and Purge	Cecilia Alcott		
2016	Girls' Frontline	Grr MG36, R93	Smartphone game	
2016	Summon Night 6	Hasaha		
2016	Blazblue: Central Fiction	Hades Izanami	PS3, PS4, PC	
2017	Infinite Stratos: Archetype Breaker	Cecilia Alcott	Smartphone game	
2017	Kirara Fantasia	Sola	Smartphone game	
2018	Fate/Grand Order	Katsushika Hokusai (as Katsushika Ōi)	Android/iOS	
2018	Dragalia Lost	Notte, Nefaria, Meene	Android/iOS	
2020	A Certain Magical Index: Imaginary Fest	Nephthys	Android, iOS	
2020	Digimon New Century	Lalamon	Android/iOS	
2021	Arknights	Dusk (Xī)	Android/iOS	
2021	Another Eden	Tsukuyomi	Android/iOS; character from Chrono Cross	
2022	Soul Tide	Minerdwen	Android/iOS	
2022	Blue Archive	Himari Akeboshi	Android/iOS	
2023	Azur Lane	Implacable	Android/iOS	
2023	Project Neural Cloud	Eos	Android/iOS	
2023	Mahjong Soul	C.C.	Android/iOS, PC	
2023	Riichi City	Hara Michiyuki	Android/iOS, PC	
2024	Aether Gazer	Zhiming: Ethereal Enigma	Android/iOS, PC	
2025	Silver and Blood	Jacintha Dalcarlo	Android/iOS, PC	

== Discography ==
=== Singles ===
- all or nothing (27 November 1998)
- 命咲く (29 October 2008)
- 春の雪 (25 May 2012)

=== Albums ===
- yu ka na (23 December 1998)
- Blooming Voices (29 October 2008)
- Kaze Tsumugi no Aria (風紡ぎのアリア) From the album Brilliant World Tales of The Abyss Image Song
