= X-Kai =

Japanese manga series

- X-Kai-
- X-Kai- English cover
- Manga
- Written by: Asami Tohjoh
- Published by: Homesha
- English publisher: NA: Tokyopop
- Magazine: Eyes Comics
- Original run: 1998 – 2000
- Volumes: 2
- icon

X-Kai- is a Japanese shōjo manga by Asami Tohjoh. It was serialized in the magazine Eyes Comics, published by Homesha, and the chapters were collected into two tankōbon.

== Story ==
=== Plot summary ===
During the day, Kaito works as a florist in a rundown flower shop, but he is actually an assassin trying to make enough money to care for his comatose older brother, who was badly burned in an accident. Kaito receives his assignments from a mysterious and beautiful woman named Suguru. However, although Kaito works as an assassin, he is not without compassion. Later on in the series, Kaito takes in a little boy he names Renge, who has been abused by his parents and other adults.

As the story progresses, more is revealed of Kaito's past. He and his older brother spent much of their childhood at an orphanage that trained young boys to be assassins, and Kaito's older brother was one of the people responsible for picking out the boys with the most potential. In the organization he works for, Kaito is considered to be the top assassin, which causes jealousy and resentment among his rivals.

== Characters ==
Kaito
Kaito works as a florist during the day, but he is actually a skilled assassin. He needs money to pay for his older brother's hospital bills. His signature flower is the Casablanca lily.
Renge
Renge is a little boy that Kaito found. When they first met, he had no name, so Kaito named him "Renge." Renge has difficulties speaking, but he learns new things easily. He is sad that Kaito has to kill others.
Sugaru
Suguru is the mysterious and beautiful woman who gives Kaito his assignments. She usually only appears when Kaito is on a mission or he needs her help.

== Manga ==
X-Kai was licensed for release in English by Tokyopop.

| No. | Original release date | Original ISBN | English release date | English ISBN |
|---|---|---|---|---|
| 1 | November, 1998 | 978-4834261028 | April 11, 2006 | 1-59816-373-6 |
Secret 1 Secret 2 Secret 3
| 2 | September, 2000 | 978-4834261387 | August 8, 2006 | 1-59816-374-4 |
Secret 4 Secret 5 Secret 6 Secret 7
