= List of Cross Ange characters =

Cross Ange characters, from left to right: Rosalie, Chris, Ersha, Vivian, Salia, Hilda, Ange, Tusk, Salamandine, Momoka, Naga and Kaname.

The Cross Ange anime and manga series features an extensive cast of characters created by Sunrise.

== Characters ==
=== Arzenal ===
Ange (アンジュ, Anju)
Voiced by: Nana Mizuki (Japanese); Emily Neves (English)
Ange, also known as Angelise Ikaruga Misurugi (アンジュリーゼ・斑鳩・ミスルギ, Anjurīze Ikaruga Misurugi) is 16-years old and the first princess of Misurugi. Before the events of the series, she is designated to be the next in line to inherit the throne, but she is a Norma who grows up thinking that she could use Mana. On the day of her coronation, she is exposed by her ambitious brother, Julio, who strips her of all royal privileges and exiled her to the island of Arzenal, where she faces the grueling work of being a mail-rider who is drafted to fight the DRAGONs, in which she must now struggle every day to stay alive or be killed by the DRAGONs.
Initially unwilling to accept her true identity as a Norma, she sees and treats other Norma as "things" much to the anger of those around her even after coming to terms with the truth. Proud and antisocial, she does not converse with others, talks only when talked to, and fights back when ridiculed. After spending several days with Tusk on a deserted island she begins to open up to others. Despite this, she is quite skilled in using a Para-mail and has good physical abilities. The only remaining possession she has from her old life is a special ring given to her by her mother that is suggested to have Mana powers which can activate her Para-mail called the "Villkiss", which was originally used by Jill during her days as a mail-rider, with or without a pilot and even from a distance. Momoka, her ever-loyal maid, later on, follows her to the island by stowing away in a transport ship where she continues being Ange's maid becomes her roommate. As she was tricked into saving her sister, Ange comes to realize that the majority of the Mana users are a bunch of hypocritical, stubborn, savage supremacists who think that being able to use Mana is required to have any kind of social bond, as she faces discrimination and is nearly executed via hanging by Julio and the people she once cared about, though Tusk saved her. Ange chastises her old self who thought there ever was peace in the world. She finds the Normas are the ones who understand that when it comes to friendship and bonds, it's the person they are inside that counts, not what they can do.
She has a relationship and has admitted that she is in love with Tusk. During the preparation for the final assault, Hilda reveals her feelings to Ange and calls Ange her "prince" but is concerned because Ange has "a princess for a friend and a man", and expresses concern over the fact that her feelings are weird since they're both girls, but Ange relieves her of those fears by kissing Hilda and telling her that she'll need her in the new world. Together they wish to protect the world and will do anything to destroy the puppetmaster pulling the strings behind the scenes. She later discovers that Embryo is the mastermind behind the whole ordeal, who not only needs Ange for his plans, but also intends to marry her. Following the end of the war, she pledges to create a nation where humans, Norma, and DRAGONs can live in peace alongside her friends.
Salia (サリア, Saria; alt. "Salire")
Voiced by: Eri Kitamura (Japanese); Kira Vincent-Davis (English)
Salia Tereshkova (サリア・テレシコワ, Saria Tereshikowa) is the Department Chief (the NCO or platoon sergeant of Angelise's unit). After Zola is killed, she is promoted to the rank of Captain but seems to have trouble dealing with unexpected situations on the battlefield. According to Vivian, she is known to read romance novels with mature content. She resents Ange for disobeying her orders and attacks the DRAGONs alone but is convinced to think otherwise after Mei tells her that she believes Ange does so in order to keep others from being killed. Mei's claim is supported by the fact that upon checking her captain's log, Salia noticed that ever since Ange joined the unit, (and after Coco, Miranda, and Zola's deaths) there have been no casualties during their previous missions.
It is revealed that during her free time, Salia would rent a changing room from Jasmine where she would cosplay as a magical girl based on a book she reads, as a way of venting and relieving her stress. Her secret is discovered by Ange, who inadvertently enters the changing room she was using. Salia, greatly embarrassed, later attempts to kill Ange, but is unsuccessful. So far, Ange is the only one who knows about Salia's secret hobby. Salia greatly admires Jill, who was called Alektra in the past, since she was a child. Upon witnessing a severely wounded Alektra return in defeat during a rebellion, the young Salia vows to exact revenge. Jill initially vows to give her the "Villkiss" up until Ange's arrival, and Salia becomes dismayed. Despite Jill's objections, she pilots the Villkiss and after realizing that Ange is meant to pilot the Villkiss, is detained for insubordination.
Currently she is the head of the Diamond Rose Knights of Embryo. When she was last beaten by Ange, she gave up on thinking Ange and Jill threw her away, but Embryo rescued her and showed her a new life. She is in love with Embryo, but overhearing his talks to Ange about his plans and desire to marry her, Salia lets Ange escape (having previously captured her for Embryo, who needs her for his plans); this greatly angers Embryo and he punishes her for it. Despite this, she is still determined to be with Embryo and desires to kill Ange. In the final battle, Embyro betrays her along with all the Diamond Rose Knights, resulting them getting killed, except Salia and Chris. Seeing Embyro abandoning her along with his true colors, she is forced to accept the fact that he never really loved or cared about her, nor can she be with him any longer since she was just a tool to him. She rejoins her friends, and accepts Jill's dying apology after learning she was Embryo's previous mistress, following the rest to the True Earth in peace. Following Embryo's defeat, she pledges to create a peaceful country for humans, Norma, and DRAGONs to thrive.
Hilda (ヒルダ, Hiruda)
Voiced by: Yukari Tamura (Japanese); Carli Mosier (English)
Hilda, also known as Hildagard Schlievogt (ヒルデガルト・シュリーフォークト, Hirudegaruto Shurīfōkuto), is a veteran mail-rider of the First Unit, she has long red hair tied with twin tails and she was the late Capt. Zola's lover. After Zola is killed and Salia taking over the command of the First Unit, she becomes the second-in-command. Because Ange is directly responsible for Zola's death, Hilda's resentment towards her causes her to sabotage her Para-mail in retaliation. According to Ersha, Hilda's personality was similar to Ange's when she was still new to Arzenal. Even after Zola's death, she still longs for the sexual prowess that she now turns to Rosalie and Chris to satisfy her sexual desires.
Years before the events of the series, she resents being in Arzenal, and that she always desires to escape from the island to order to see her mother again who lives in the Enderant Union. An opportunity came during the "Festa Festival" where she aids Ange's escape by hijacking Misty's transport. Though Ange intends to leave her behind as revenge for her bullying, she has a change of heart after learning her reason for helping her escape. Upon returning home, Hilda realizes that her mother had almost completely forgotten about her and has practically replaced her with another Hilda as the memory of her eldest daughter has devastated her. Hilda leaves at her mother's request (having been completely disowned by her) and is left completely heartbroken by the experience, as the police beat her up and drag her back to Arzenal, where she's thrown in a detention cell for a week as punishment for escaping. When Ange returns from her own experience, and helps comfort her over the heartbreak, they swear to destroy the twisted world they live in. Eventually, she replaces Salia as commander of the First Unit after the latter was manipulated into siding with Embryo.
Hilda recently went through some serious soul searching after Ange was sent to the other Earth and when Ange was captured by Salia realized how much she cares for Ange. She later becomes the commander of the Aurora in Jill's place when she is stripped of her command, but turns it over to Ange when she returns to begin the final invasion. During the preparation for the final assault, Hilda reveals her feelings to Ange and calls Ange her "prince" but is concerned because Ange has "a princess for a friend and a man", and expresses concern over the fact that her feelings are weird since they're both girls, but Ange relieves her of those fears by kissing Hilda and telling her that she'll need her in the new world, surprising her. She apparently views Tusk as a love rival as he has feelings for Ange too. After Embryo is defeated, she works with her friends to create a nation for humans, Norma, and DRAGONs to live in peace.
Vivian / Mii (ヴィヴィアン / ミィ, Vivian / Mī)
Voiced by: Houko Kuwashima (Japanese); Brittney Karbowski (English)
Another mail-rider of the First Unit, who has short pinkish-red hair and is always seen with a lollipop in her mouth. Unlike the rest of her unit, she's rather friendly towards Ange. She is always cheerful and enjoys asking quizzes to her squadmates. Following the DRAGONs assault on Arzenal, Vivian sees that her jar of lollipops has been shattered, and they're all dirty. Although she shrugs it off, not long after she wakes up feeling heavier and taller, and soon realizes that she is actually a DRAGON, not a Norma as previously thought, and the lollipops had been keeping her in human form, hence why, by instinct, she enjoys Ange's song. Vivian is left shocked by this as she ends up the target of a DRAGON hunt around the base, until Ange recognizes her when Vivian starts singing her song, and she calls the hunt off, with this incident revealing the true nature of the DRAGONs to the whole First Unit.
Later, Vivian (in her DRAGON form), winds up with Ange and Tusk on the DRAGONs' home planet, which just so happens to be the original Earth in the far future following a devastating war that nearly wiped out humanity, which is what caused them to turn themselves into what they are now through genetic modification. Once they are found by the DRAGON community, and taken to their main city, she is given special medical treatment to better control her transformations without the need of lollipops, and is reunited with her biological mother, who originally named her Mii, and had been worried ever since losing her as a baby. Vivian wishes to introduce her mother to Ersha and her other friends.
Rosalie (ロザリー, Rozarī)
Voiced by: Kaori Ishihara (Japanese); Margaret Lewis (English)
An older mail-rider with short orange hair, who is always seen with Hilda and Chris. Due to Ange being directly responsible for Zola's death, she resents the fallen princess and tries to get revenge by ridiculing her constantly, however, much to her chagrin, Ange manages to exact revenge on her. She, together with Hilda and Chris engages in a form of ménage à trois in Zola's room which is now owned by Hilda. After she and the rest of the unit are saved by Ange from a new and very powerful DRAGON, she finally accepts and befriends Ange. Upon learning that Hilda was simply using her, Chris, and Zola as a means of achieving her goals, Rosalie becomes increasingly resentful towards her during her abandonment. They later make amends when Julio and his army invade Arzenal. She has feelings for Chris and wants to rescue her from Embryo after she was manipulated into siding with him. After the end of the war and getting Chris back, she and her friends vow to create a peaceful country for humans, Norma, and DRAGONs alike.
Ersha (エルシャ, Erusha)
Voiced by: Ami Koshimizu (Japanese); Christina Kelly (English)
A senior mail-rider with long pink hair, and acts as a mother figure to her unit especially to Vivian/Mii, but is terrifying when angered that even Hilda wouldn't dare cross. She, along with Vivian, are the only one in Ange's unit who actually cares for her even more so after Ange's attitude starts to change. She also happens to be a chef who would sometimes be assigned to cook for the entire personnel.
She later becomes a member of Embryo's Diamond Rose Knights as repayment for saving the children lost during Juilo's attack on Arzenal. She is the Principal of the Kindergarten that Embryo set up for those children, but realizes that there are strings attached to his help compared to Salia and Chris. When the children die again during the DRAGON invasion, Embryo shows his true colors and refuses to bring them back a second time, stating he never wanted the children in his new world. This makes her realize that he was using her as his pawn and leaves him to return to her friends. Following Embryo's defeat and the end of the war, she works with her friends to build a nation for Norma, humans, and DRAGONs to live together in peace.
Chris (クリス, Kurisu)
Voiced by: Yui Ogura (Japanese); Caitlynn French (English)
An older mail-rider with silver hair tied with a braid. She is usually shy and introverted, so she's always with Hilda and Rosalie where they engage in a lesbian ménage à trois. She, too, initially despised Ange who was responsible for Zola's death early in the series but eventually accepted and befriended her along with Rosalie after Ange saved the entire unit from being killed by a new powerful DRAGON. Upon learning that Hilda was simply using her, Rosalie, and Zola as a means of achieving her goals, Chris becomes increasingly resentful towards her. They later make amends when Julio and his army invade Arzenal. She is shot during the battle and nearly dies until Embryo appears and heals her using Mana.
Another of Embryo's Diamond Rose Knights. After healing her, she was told she was abandoned by her friends (not knowing that Hilda and Rosalie were looking for her after Ange engaged Julio's fleet). She accepts Embryo's offer of companionship and friendship and vows to kill Hilda and Rosalie for seemly abandoning her. During the final battle, Embryo betrays Chris and the Diamond Rose Knights, sending them to their deaths at the hands of the DRAGON clan, killing them all except for Chris and Salia. Feeling abandoned again and realizing Embryo's true colors, Chris loses her sanity and angrily drives to destroy everything, until Rosalie risks her life to regain Chris' spirit by making them both freefall, who then tells her that she loves her and didn't really abandon her at all before Hilda catches them; she then regains her sanity and rejoins her friends. Following Embryo's defeat, Chris pledges to create a place for Norma, humans, and DRAGONs to live together peacefully alongside her friends.
Jill (ジル, Jiru)
Voiced by: Takako Honda (Japanese); Brenda Valdivia (English)
Jill, also known as Alektra Maria von Loewenherz (アレクトラ・マリア・フォン・レーベンヘルツ, Arekutora Maria fon Rēbenherutsu; alt. "Alektra Maria von Löwenherz"), is the supreme commander of Arzenal. Jill is the first pilot of the "Villkiss" and is presumed to be responsible for Tusk's parents' death. Despite the rule that Normas are not allowed to have any personal property on the island, she gives back the ring Ange inherited from her deceased mother which suggests that she is aware it contains Mana that only Ange can use. She also willingly allows Ange to "buy" Momoka, aware that the latter was secretly going to be sentenced to death for discovering the existence of Arzenal and the DRAGONs (both of which are highly classified information) had she departed the base after her "visit" under the Arzenal "rule" that one can buy anything with enough money.
She is actually the first Norma to be born of royal blood, where she used to have the title as the "First Princess of the Galia Empire" and she is also condemned and exiled to Arzenal to fight the DRAGONs. She is the first to be able to unlock the "Villkiss" thus allowing her to pilot it which eventually led to a rebellion called "Libertas". During this time, she falls in love with Tusk's father, Istvan though unrequited. Dismayed by this, she easily falls to Embryo's manipulation, which leads to the failure of "Libertas". Years later, she intends to kill Embryo in her next "Libertas" plan, using the DRAGONs as decoys. Although eventually stripped of command when she reveals the failure of the first Libertas, Jill helps Ange and her allies fight Embryo. After Embryo mortally wounds her, Jill assures Salia that she is like a sister to her as she dies.
Emma Bronson (エマ・ブロンソン, Ema Buronson)
Voiced by: Yukana (Japanese); Tiffany Grant (English)
The only Mana user in Arzenal and Jill's second-in-command, who takes rules very seriously. Like all Mana users, she views Normas as "things" or inhuman, it is suggested that she works for the Rosenblums and that her function isn't just being the island's second-in-command but also being the island's caretaker where she oversees its overall functions. After being nearly killed by Julio's forces and saved by Jill, she now drowns her sorrows with alcohol and gives her full support to the Libertas. As the truth about Mana is known, Emma comes to understand the Norma.
Mei (メイ, Mei)
Voiced by: Mai Fuchigami (Japanese); Hilary Haag (English)
She is one of the technical staff in charge of maintaining the Para-mails, she is also in charge of salvaging downed Para-mails as well as rescuing downed mail-riders who are either alive or dead. She claims to be able to somewhat understand the feelings of the Para-mail's pilot when she does maintenance on them. She had an older sister named Zhao Fei-Ling (ジャオ・フェイリン, Jao Feirin) who was in the same unit as Jill during the latter's days as a Para-mail rider but was killed during a rebellion with Jill as the sole survivor of their unit.
Maggie (マギー, Magī; "Maggy")
Voiced by: Megumi Toyoguchi (Japanese); Kelly Manison (English)
The cybernetics repair expert, who is also the island's resident medic where she always excited at the sight of blood.
Jasmine (ジャスミン, Jasumin)
Voiced by: Sakiko Tamagawa (Japanese); Marcy Bannor (English)
An older woman and a friend of Jill, she is a veteran mail rider who has retired and has been running the giant marketplace "Jasmine Mall" within Arzenal ever since. She's always accompanied by her dog, John. However, she is a shrewd businesswoman who takes full advantage of her business monopoly on the island. She is also well aware and informed of the many goings-on within the top command of Arzenal and is the one in charge of keeping in contact with Tusk. It was revealed later on that she is the first Norma to be in command of Arzenal and the only one who has established contact with the ancient people.
Zola Axberg (ゾーラ・アクスバリ, Zōra Akusubari)
Voiced by: Michiko Neya (Japanese); Shelley Calene-Black (English)
Zola is the captain of the first unit (where Ange is assigned) whose right eye is artificial. She is Hilda's lover, yet despite it, she is promiscuous and a hedonist with a preference for new cadets. She is killed when Ange involuntary clings onto her in a panic and a DRAGON hits them with its wing, causing them both to fall into the ocean.
Coco Reeve (ココ・リーブ, Koko Rību)
Voiced by: Ayumi Tsuji (Japanese); Shanae'a Moore (English)
A new cadet, who idolizes Angelise. She's killed by a DRAGON during their first deployment when she pursued Angelise, who is trying to escape.
Miranda Campbell (ミランダ・キャンベル, Miranda Kyanberu)
Voiced by: Minori Chihara (Japanese); Karlii Hoch (English)
Another new cadet who is also Coco's friend, she tries to stop Angelise from deserting, however, a DRAGON caught her and soon enough other DRAGONs swoop in and devoured her.
Tusk (タスク, Tasuku; alt. "Task")
Voiced by: Mamoru Miyano (Japanese); Austin Tindle (English)
Ange's love interest. A young male of the Ancient People that Ange encounters while she is stranded on a deserted island. His parents are Para-mail riders who are killed in combat with Jill and the "Villkiss" years before the events of the series thus he recognizes it immediately when he found Ange on the beach. He is also knowledgeable about repairing Para-mails after studying the various Para-mail parts that wash up on the island he lives on. Despite many awkward moments with Ange, he has saved her life twice and eventually falls in love with her and even asks her to leave the island with him though she refuses. It is Ange's meeting and time spent with him that helps her change her attitude towards the others in Arzenal.
After leaving the island, he keeps in contact with Arzenal through Jasmine claiming that he will continue reconnaissance of the Misurugi Empire while searching for his comrades. He later infiltrates the Misurugi Empire and saves Ange as she is about to be sentenced to death by Julio and calls himself a Knight of the Villkiss. Later, he, Ange, and Vivian are transported to an alternate Earth that has been destroyed by war and humanity has been wiped out.
Tusk is part of the mission to free Ange and the others from Embryo, killing Embryo several times in order to protect Ange. He was presumed dead by Ange, but somehow he escaped the dead man's vest with Momoka and has been reunited with her. The two made love and they agree to protect the world. A love rivalry seems to develop between him and Hilda, who also has feelings for Ange. Embryo also expresses hatred towards him because he is also in love with Ange, serving as a second love rival to Tusk. After he kills Embryo for real and stops his plans, he works with Ange and her friends to create a nation for Norma, DRAGONs, and humans to live together peacefully.
A running gag throughout the series is that Tusk ends up with his face in Ange's crotch by accident.
Pamela (パメラ, Pamera)
Voiced by: Junko Hatsuya (Japanese); Cara Duncan (English)
She is the Chief Communications Control Operator for Arzenal.
Hikaru (ヒカル, Hikaru)
Voiced by: Nanako Mori (Japanese); Kat Cordes (English)
She is the Chief Dispatcher for Arzenal.
Olivier (オリビエ, Oribie)
Voiced by: Nao Tōyama (Japanese); Patricia Duran (English)
She is the Novice Communications Operator for Arzenal.
Eleanor (エレノア, Erenoa)
Voiced by: Ikumi Hayama (Japanese); Tiffany Terrell (English)
Eleanor, who has a masculine voice, is a veteran mail-rider and is the captain of the second unit, the Eleanor Squad. She pilots a para-mail painted in red. After she makes a sortie, her unit is eventually annihilated in an attack by Salamandine.
Tanya Zabirova (ターニャ・ザビロワ, Tānya Zabirowa)
Voiced by: Reina Ueda (Japanese); Amanda L. Baird (English)
She is the woman who has distinct purple hair and a high-class air to her. She is also a member of the Betty Squad. She is captured by an unmanned weapon called "Pyrethroid". She is a member of the Diamond Rose Knights until Embryo used her as a decoy that is devoured by a DRAGON.
Irma Kankkunen (イルマ・カンクネン, Iruma Kankunen)
Voiced by: Nanako Mori (Japanese); Allison Sumrall (English)
Tanya's roommate.
Shannon (シャノン, Shanon)
She has brown hair. She is a member of the Betty Squad.
Camilla (カミラ, Kamira)
She has blonde hair. She is a member of the Betty Squad.
Nancy (ナンシー, Nanshī)
She has yellow-green hair. She is a member of the Betty Squad.
Ann Elgar (アン・エルガー, An Erugā)
Ann is a boyish mail-rider, who is killed by three DRAGONs before Ange is sent to Arzenal.
Mary (メアリー, Mearī)
Voiced by: Akari Kitō
Mary is a new-fledged Mail-rider who is assigned to the para-mail squadron of Aurora. She is in the middle of studying as a cadet-rider, but she has experienced real battles due to force repletion. She is the oldest among recruits and offers stewardship to them.
Nonna (ノンナ, Nonna)
Voiced by: Ruriko Aoki
She is a novice mail-rider trained by Rosalise and is part of a para-mail squadron aboard the Aurora.
Marika Bellucci (マリカ・ベルッチ, Marika Berucchi)
Voiced by: Nichika Omori
She is one of the new recruits, who greatly admires Vivian. She was killed by an insane Chris.
Naomi (ナオミ, Naomi)
Voiced by: Sayuri Hara
Naomi is the protagonist of video game Cross Ange tr.. A childhood friend of Coco and Miranda. In tr. Naomi fell into coma during her first sortie instead of dying in the anime. After regains consciousness, she decided to restores relationships of teammates and must repay a monetary debt. Naomi's choices affects the outcome of story and ending of game.

=== Empire of Misurugi ===
July Asuka Misurugi (ジュライ・飛鳥・ミスルギ, Jurai Asuka Misurugi; alt. "Jurai Asuka Misurugi")
Voiced by: Koichi Yamadera (Japanese); David Wald (English)
He is the Emperor of Misurugi and Ange's father. Like his wife Empress Sophia, he is aware that Ange is a Norma but kept it secret to protect his daughter. When Julio revolts and exposes the truth about Ange and after Sophia is killed in her attempt to escape with Ange, a grief-stricken July is captured and sentenced to death for his deception.
Sophia Ikaruga Misurugi (ソフィア・斑鳩・ミスルギ, Sofia Ikaruga Misurugi)
Voiced by: Megumi Hayashibara (Japanese); Allison Sumrall (English)
She was the Empress of Misurugi and Ange's mother who has always known that her eldest daughter was a Norma but decides to keep it from her until the day of Ange's coming of age ceremony during which Julio, who has found out about it, decides to expose her in public. Fearing for Ange's safety, they attempt to escape but failed. She rescues Ange at the cost of her own life. Before dying, she relinquishes her ring to Ange the night before the ceremony, which contains part of her mana where it is implied that she knew of Ange's future and that the mana in the ring has infused with the "Villkiss" Para-mail that Ange now uses.
Julio Asuka Misurugi (ジュリオ・飛鳥・ミスルギ, Jurio Asuka Misurugi)
Voiced by: Kōsuke Toriumi (Japanese); Blake Shepard (English)
The oldest child and only male of the Misurugi royal family and Ange's older brother. He is highly ambitious and power-hungry as he desires the throne of Misurugi for himself going so far as to expose the truth about Ange being a Norma to the public during the latter's coming of age ceremony. After his mother's death, he has his father executed and claims himself the new Emperor of the Misurugi Empire. He is ruthless as the news of his mother's sudden death does not seem to affect him but he also appears to show affection to his youngest sister Sylvia. He exiles Ange to Arzenal, but Ange is tenacious of life, so he comes up with the idea of using Ange to restore the Influence of the discredited royal household. After he uses Momoka and Sylvia, and purposely provides Ange with an opportunity to flee from Arzenal, to lure Ange into coming to the Imperial Palace, Julio intends to sentence Ange to death to strengthen his political foundation, but his plans were thwarted by Tusk. In a summit conference of government leaders, he is the first man to agree with Embryo's opinion and commands the squadron to invade Arzenal to capture Ange. He sends soldiers armed with assault rifles and flame throwers and unmanned flying weapons and commands them to erase the Norma and arrest the Mail-rider. When Ange confronts the helpless Julio at point-blank range, he is revealed to be a total coward. However, he is instead killed by Embryo for his foolishness. It is also implied that he too is one of Embryo's pawns.
Sylvia Ikaruga Misurugi (シルヴィア・斑鳩・ミスルギ, Shiruvia Ikaruga Misurugi)
Voiced by: Nao Tōyama (Japanese); Cindy Lou Parker (English)
The youngest daughter of the Misurugi royal family and Ange's younger sister. She is a paraplegic who lost the use of her lower extremities which was a result of the accident that she sustained when she fell off a horse while riding with Ange many years ago, Ange blames herself for it and promises that she will protect her, she uses mana powered floating chair to move around. The shock of learning the truth about her sister causes her to faint. It is hinted that she was the one who assisted Momoka in locating Ange as she later tries to secretly contact her using her mana asking her whether or not she has found Ange yet but was "caught and taken away" before Ange could speak to her. This is later revealed to be a trick to lure Ange back home so that Sylvia can exact revenge on her sister despite the fact their parents knew and protected Ange. She later discovers Liza's secret and is captured by her. After learning from Riza that Julio was the one who killed their father which Sylvia was blind over the fact (and in English dub Embryo was the one who killed her brother), Sylvia has started to regain parts of her original personality, starting with crying over the event and regretting her actions. Eventually, Ange faces Sylvia one last time and reveals Sylvia's wounds have been healed and that she did not attempt to walk because of the trauma, forcing her sister to walk once again. At that moment, Sylvia deeply regrets her hatred towards Ange. After the end of the war, with her world deprived of the Light of Mana and torn apart by chaos and anarchy, her helpless personality disappears and she leads a squad of survivors within the ruins of the now-leaderless Misurugi defending people from marauders.
Liza Randog / Lizardia (リィザ・ランドッグ / リザーディア, Rīza Randoggu / Rizādia; alt. "Riza Randog" and "Rizardia")
Voiced by: Yukana (Japanese); Katelyn Barr (English)
Julio's personal bodyguard and mistress, who is manipulating him for her own goals. It is revealed she's also a DRAGON in human form, in actuality possessing wings and a tail. She was sent by the other DRAGONs as a spy to find out the whereabouts of the First DRAGON, Aura, who was captured by Embryo. However, Embryo captures her after Julio's death and forces her to lead Salamandine's fleet into a trap. Liza is seen tortured by a mad Sylvia until Momoka comforts her and escape. Liza joins "Last Libertas" for the final battle, and settles with Ange and the DRAGONs in the True Earth.
Momoka Oginome (モモカ・荻野目, Momoka Oginome)
Voiced by: Sumire Uesaka (Japanese); Cynthia Martinez (English)
She is Ange's top maid who had been serving her since childhood. She admires Ange greatly because of the kindness and compassion the latter showed her when they were both children. She uses Mana not only to perform her duty as a maid but also to protect her from harm since she was aware that Ange is incapable of using Mana and, just like Sophia, she too kept it secret from Ange.
Her utmost dedication towards Ange is so great that she stowed away in a transport ship to Arzenal to find her then is discovered in the base but was allowed to stay for a few days by Jill. She is shocked to learn how much Ange's personality had changed during their time away from each other. She tries to bring Ange back to her old self but fails unaware of the pain, hardship, and danger Ange endured before her arrival. As she was about to leave the base, Ange "buys" her with a very large amount of money which Jill accepts knowing that Momoka would be executed for discovering the existence of Arzenal and the DRAGONs both of which are highly classified information. She now lives with Ange in the latter's room continuing her duties as Ange's maid and confidant forever.
During the attack of the Misurugi Empire, she rescues Ange from Embryo by stabbing him and pushing him off a cliff and survives. She and Emma are the only Mana users who settle down with the Norma.
Serra (セーラ, Sēra)
Serra is an infant and the first Norma whom Angelise met. Serra is taken away by police agents, through her mother. Serra's mother is the very few Mana users to hold little prejudice towards Norma. Serra's further fate is unknown. Unlike Hilda's mother and most people of the Misurugi Empire, Serra's mother refused to replace Serra with another child, and her hate for Angelise is not because she is a Norma (something Ange herself wasn't even aware of at the time), but because she allowed her daughter to be taken.
Akiho (アキホ, Akiho)
Voiced by: Reina Ueda (Japanese); Robin Nennig (English)
She is the schoolgirl of Hououin, who is a friend of Angelise until she was found to be a Norma. When encountering Ange again, she secretly tried to report her but Ange stops her. Realizing there is no equality among the people of Misurugi Empire, Ange breaks her friendship with Akiho for good, having further realized that the mana has made her too stubborn to listen to reason.

=== Kingdom of Rosenblum ===
Misty Rosenblum (ミスティ・ローゼンブルム, Misuti Rōzenburumu)
Voiced by: Mariya Ise (Japanese); Amanda L. Baird (English)
She is a Princess of the Kingdom of Rosenblum. She first appears as one of opposing teams whom Angelise competes with in some sort of para-mail Lacrosse before she is expose as a "Norma". After the championship, she had admired Angelise's excellence. Her family is one of the few elites who knows about the clandestine operations in Arzenal and it is suggested that they are also one of the few who manages it. She went to the island during the "Festa Festival" to learn what happened Ange but she ended up as her hostage where her transport was used as a means to escape. It is hinted that Misty doesn't discriminate Norma.

=== People of Aura ===
Salamandine (サラマンディーネ, Saramandīne; also "Salamandinay")
Voiced by: Yui Horie (Japanese); Juliet Simmons (English)
A Princess from the Freya DRAGON clan, and is capable of controlling other DRAGONs with the song "El Ragna". She pilots the Ryu-Shing-Ki Enryugo that is capable of shooting a beam that disintegrates anything in its path and almost destroyed Arzenal. Also, she showed interest in Ange, who released the hidden power of Villkiss in a battle, so she made Ange experience a hallucination which made her feel like she passed through space and time.
When Ange, Tusk and Vivian are transported to her world, she treats them warmly and reveals the truth to Ange about what happened to the True Earth and about Aura. Salamandine later tries to convince Ange to aid them in locating and freeing Aura which, in the process, would free Normas of all the discrimination they had suffered for years which coincides with Ange's goals. After what looks to be an unstable singular point opens and destroys part of the city, Ange and Salamandine work together to stop it and later become friends. After the end of the war, she works with Ange and her friends to build a country for humans, DRAGONs, and Norma to thrive. Ange then gives her the nickname "Salako" due to the name "Salamandine" being too hard for her to pronounce.
Naga (ナーガ, Nāga)
Voiced by: Nanako Mori
She is member of Salamandine's entourage and is a swordswoman. A pilot of the Ryu-Shing-Ki Soryugo, but if there are people who try to do wrong to Salamandine, Naga openly displays her hostility. Due to her deep love, she sometimes lose control of herself.
Kaname (カナメ, Kaname)
Voiced by: Ikumi Hayama
She is member of Salamandine's entourage and makes full use of Naginata. A pilot of the Ryu-Shing-Ki Hekiryugo. Naga and Kaname have served Salamandine since they were young, and they are the close friends. Kaname is the staff officer of Sala, a discreet person who has the capacity to see the big picture.
Aura Midgardia (アウラ・ミドガルディア, Aura Midogarudia)
Voiced by: Kana Asumi
She is a princess who is rare for a direct line of the Aura, which have the oldest history of DRAGON. Young as she is, she is elected as the supreme leader, and the ardent wish of her is to try to recapture Aura.
Dr. Gecko (ドクター・ゲッコー, Dokutā Gekkō)
Voiced by: Akeno Watanabe (Japanese); Allison Keith (English)
The doctor in charge among the DRAGONs. On the True Earth, she hatches up a plan that uses Tusk as a sample of the sex education because there are few men of the human type. She sometimes acts a bit unrestrained and overdoes things but everybody recognizes her ability.
Lamia (ラミア, Ramia)
Voiced by: Mai Nakahara
She is Vivian's mother who separated from Vivian and lost contact with her ten years ago. She reunites with her beloved daughter, Mii, who had gone missing across the singular point. Her hobby is to quiz others too.
Aura (アウラ, Aura)
Voiced by: Kotono Mitsuishi
The first DRAGON. She is the Mother and origin of all Mana users. Embryo captured Aura for his own ideal peace. She was freed by Ange and Salamandine and returns to the True Earth.

=== Others ===
Embryo (エンブリヲ, Enburiwo)
Voiced by: Toshihiko Seki (Japanese); Chris Patton (English)
The series' main antagonist. Embryo resents the world from a position that is one step higher than that of the administrators. He owns the lost weapons and techniques of ancient times. He has piloted the Black Ragna-mail "Hysterica" which has six wings and has a form similar to Ange's Villkiss. He also knows the same song as Sala and Ange which he uses to control Hysterica, the more powerful prototype of current Para-mails. He once annihilated Jill's squad before the latter's rebellion, thus making him her arch-nemesis. He is the turner of the Mana system by confining the Mother of DRAGONs, Aura, and used her life force as factor energy, and is able to heal fatal injuries with Mana. However, he is unable to convert every human (only females) into Mana users upon birth. The Light of Mana has given the people life semingly without struggle, but his aforementioned flaw created a world where "Norma" are oppressed, thus proclaiming the idea that "Norma" is a sin to society and relocate them to Arzenal, to the advantage of Embryo making the Norma and DRAGONs fight each other as a cover-up to harvest the Dragnium crystals that are inside the bodies of the DRAGONs in order to re-supply Aura, leading Embryo to think humanity can never suppress the desire for immorality, going as far as to destroy and re-create the worlds.
He is miserable with the direction that the human race has taken, thinking of them as toys, and needs Ange, Aura, and the Villkiss to merge False Earth with True Earth. He can control the minds of all who use Mana and can corrupt those who do not by manipulating their insecurities. However, he is also quite heartless and has the characteristics of a madman, showing very little regard for innocent people and his minions and is even willing to kill, abandon, or sacrifice them for his own wicked deeds. At one point, he kills Julio for his actions. He eventually convinces Chris, Ersha, and Salia to join his side and has Salia capture Ange, who is a requirement for his plans. After Ange rejects him and shows her strong will, Embryo falls in love with her despite needing her for his goal and wants her as his wife. When Embryo proceeds to torture Ange to make her accept him, she tries to escape. Embryo's attempts to stop her fail thanks to Tusk, Momoka, and Salia, who expresses jealousy of Embryo being in love with Ange instead of her. Ersha soon leaves him upon learning of his true colors while Chris and Salia are later betrayed when he abandons them along with the rest of his Diamond Rose Knights, leading the three to rejoin their friends while Embryo's other pawns are murdered. At the end of the war, Embryo kidnaps and traps Ange with him in his safe space, enraged that Ange made love with Tusk, whom he views as a love rival. He prepares to rape her to make Ange finally submit to him, but Tusk, Salia, Hilda, and Salako arrive just in time; this shocks Embryo as no one should've been able to find their way into his safe space, but Tusk reveals that their Villkisses are built with his technology, which allows them to track him down. Embryo fights Tusk one on one while Ange and her squadron face his Villkisses for the final time in the timeless universe. After being fatally wounded by Tusk and with no means of escaping his death, Embryo disintegrates and the two worlds are restored.
In the video game version. Embryo decided to leave Naomi to die during her first sortie but she miraculously survived. During Embryo's route, he told Naomi that how she survived encourages him to restore worlds to be a better place without destroying the two worlds and believes that destiny can be changed just like Naomi did before. After the final battle of Naomi and Ange, the two worlds were merged into a new world with the help of Aura. The new world is the world without Mana and people from both worlds live with no memories from the past. Embryo now lives as the chairman of Saint Arzenal School.

== Mecha ==
=== Villkiss ===
Called the Weapon of God by Tusk was Jill's machine during the first revolt against Embryo and given to Ange after her first failed sorte. It is a medium/close range combat machine using an assault rifle and sword as its armament. When Ange and Tusk were in the Real Earth, she saw a black Ragna-Mail (from where all Para-mails are copied from) that looked like her Villkiss destroy the Draconic reactors and wipe out most of the population. Ange seems to have a deeper connection to the Villkiss as she has been known to insult it in times of need and it responds to the situation, showing that it might not be just a machine. These are the currently known abilities that have appeared with the link through Ange's ring, but Ange feels there is something still hiding in the Villkiss' core. Twice the Villkiss has restored itself from damage that would cripple or destroy normal machines.

Blue Villkiss (Flight)

This mode gives the Villkiss a boost of speed in flight and the ability to teleport, even across dimensions – though Ange does not know how to control where it ends up for now.

Red Villkiss (Assault)

Shown during the invasion of Arzenal, there is an increase of maneuverability and power. The sword becomes an energy blade with an extended range that can slash through the toughest armour with ease.

Gold Villkiss (Cannon)

When Ange sings the Song of the Stars, two openings appear on the shoulders priming the Space Dimensional cannons. These cannons are capable to destroying anything in front of them, or able to cancel out another Space Dimensional cannon shot (which she used is stopping Salia in the battle of Arzenal and to stop Embryo's attack on the Real Earth).
