= Cyclops (1987 film) =

Japanese science fiction horror film

- Film poster
- Directed by: Jōji Iida
- Screenplay by: Jōji Iida; Hisashi Saito
- Produced by: Iyo Suzuki
- Starring: Kai Atō; Mayumi Hasegawa; Yoshimasa Kondo; Kazuhiro Sano; Nobuo Takahashi
- Cinematography: Toshihiko Uryu
- Edited by: Ken'ichi Takashima
- Music by: Unio Mystica
- Production company: Graphis
- Distributed by: Graphis
- Release date: October 26, 1987 (Japan)
- Running time: 52 minutes
- Country: Japan
- Language: Japanese

Cyclops (Japanese: キクロプス, Hepburn: Kikuropusu) is a 1987 Japanese science fiction horror original video short film co-written and directed by Jōji Iida. It was Iida's directorial debut, released on October 26, 1987, in Japan. The film is known for its intense gore and practical effects, created by Yûichi Matsui and Shuichi Kokumai.

== Premise ==
A group of scientists create mutant creatures via implanted embryos in human women. Their most recent test subject commits suicide before giving birth. The scientists, along with one of their mutants, head to a nearby city, seeking a new subject for experimentation.

== Cast ==
- Kai Atō as Michio Sonezaki
- Mayumi Hasegawa
- Yoshimasa Kondo
- Kazuhiro Sano
- Nobuo Takahashi
- Yoko Higashino
