= Kai Atō =

Japanese actor and television personality (1946–2015)

- 阿藤 快
- Born: Kōichi Atō; 14 November 1946; Odawara, Kanagawa, Japan
- Died: 15 November 2015 (aged 69); Shinjuku, Tokyo, Japan
- Body discovered: 15 November 2015
- Education: Tokyo Metropolitan University
- Occupations: Actor, television personality
- Years active: 1970 - 2015
- Agent: Bonito LLC

Kai Atō (阿藤 快, Atō Kai; 14 November 1946 – 15 November 2015) was a Japanese actor and television personality. His birth name was Kōichi Atō (阿藤 公一, Atō Kōichi), and until 14 November 2001, his stage name was written with different kanji characters as (阿藤 海).

== Biography ==
Atō was born on 14 November 1946 in Odawara, Kanagawa. He attended Tokyo Metropolitan University, studying law.

Atō was found dead at his home in Shinjuku, Tokyo, on 15 November 2015, a day after his 69th birthday. His agency website lists his date of death as 14 November 2015, approximately at his 69th birthday.

== Filmography ==
Film
Year	Title	Role	Notes
1972	Female Convict Scorpion: Jailhouse 41	Ogata	
1973	Lady Snowblood	Henchman	
1973	Mushukunin mikogami no jôkichi: Tasogare ni senko ga tonda		
1976	Kimi yo fundo no kawa o watare		
1976	Seishun no satsujinsha		
1978	Osou!	Ôkubo	
1978	Mottomo kiken na yuugi	Keiji B	
1978	Never Give Up		
1978	Satsujin yugi	Bunta Izutsu	
1979	Woman with Red Hair	Takao	
1979	Hakuchyu no shikaku	Tatekawa	
1979	Oretachi ni haka wa nai	Kanbe	
1979	The Resurrection of the Golden Wolf	Nosaka	
1979	Yasha-ga-ike	The Bone	
1979	Dôran		
1980	Kagemusha	Zenjiro Amemiya	
1980	Yajû shisubeshi	Tojo	
1980	Za ûman		
1980	Disciples of Hippocrates	Kanzaki	
1980	Tosa No Ipponzuri	Kuma	
1981	Masho no natsu - 'Yotsuya kaidan' yori		
1981	Kôfuku		
1981	Station	Ryosuke Honjo	
1982	Kaseki no kouya	Police Iwashita	
1982	Waisetsu kazoku: haha to musume	Mishima	
1982	Kaze no uta o kike	DJ	
1982	Yaju-deka	Kita	
1982	Kaikyô		
1983	Amagi goe		
1983	Nogare no machi	Hatta	
1984	Irodori-gawa	Det. Yoshino	
1984	Kita no hotaru	Ryuzo	
1985	Capone Cries a Lot	Bank Manager	
1985	Penguin's Memory - Shiawase monogatari	Al	Voice
1985	Bi bappu haisukuru	Mr. Baba	
1986	Bakumatsu seishun graffiti: Ronin Sakamoto Ryoma	Sonojo Sawamura	
1987	Yogisha	Samejima	
1987	Jiyu na megami tachi	Umekichi	
1987	Shinjuku Jun'ai Monogatari	Tashiro	
1987	Kikuropusu	Michio Sonezaki	
1987	Gorufu yoakemae		
1987	Don Matsugorô no daibôken	Kanda Criminal	
1988	Ikoka modoroka		
1988	Bakayaro! I'm Plenty Mad	Raizo Hayashi	(Episode 3)
1988	Kanashi iro yanen	Ritsuo	
1990	Hong Kong Paradise	Tsukada	
1992	Kira kira hikaru		
2000	Another Heaven	Shinji Ohno	
2004	Atarashii kaze - Wakaki hi no Yoda Benzo	Takozo	
2005	Cromartie High - The Movie	Kai Atō	
2005	Sô kamo shirenai		
2007	Tantei monogatari		
2008	Johnen: Sada no ai		
2008	20-seiki shônen: Honkaku kagaku bôken eiga		
2008	Hômuresu ga chûgakusei		
2009	Chikujô seyo!		
2011	Deadball		
2013	Setouchi kaizoku monogatari		
2014	Nemurihime: Dream On Dreamer		
2014	Itsukano, genkantachi to		
2014	Tsuki ga kirei desune		
2015	Shinema no tenshi		
2016	Tosa no ipponzuri		
