= List of Saint Seiya Omega characters =

The main cast of Saint Seiya Omega as appearing in the opening sequence. Left to right: Eden (background), Haruto, Yuna, Koga, Souma and Ryuhou.

The following article comprises a list of the characters appearing in the anime Saint Seiya Omega, a spinoff of Masami Kurumada's manga and anime Saint Seiya.

The characters are organized according to the factions they belong to, or as secondary characters that are affiliated to none.

== Main characters ==
Pegasus Koga (天馬座(ペガサス)の光牙, Pegasasu no Kōga)
Voiced by: Hikaru Midorikawa, Satsuki Yukino (as child)
A 13-year-old boy (14 in Season 2), who is destined to become the Pegasus Bronze Saint in the future era. The main protagonist in the series, trained since his early childhood to become a Saint, Koga is rebellious but also compassionate. He is still unaware of the purpose of having become a Saint in an era of peace, and has yet to discover his destiny. He meets Seiya, who teaches him the importance of friendship. Despite being capable of dealing Light-based attacks, Koga is later revealed to originally command the element of Darkness and be a host for Abzu, the God of Darkness. During the final battle against Abzu, with his Pegasus Cloth damaged, he dons Seiya's Sagittarius Cloth and defeats the God of Darkness, expelling the darkness from his body. While recovering from his wounds from the battle with Abzu, Koga learns of the advent of the war with Pallas' army, but claims that his days as a saint are over with his cloth damaged beyond repair, until he is attacked by one of Pallas' Pallasites and with his Cosmo, he manages to revive the Pegasus Cloth in a new, reinforced form, returning to his duty as a Saint of Athena, and it later gets a second upgrade when he and his friends Cosmo combines into the Macro Cosmo (大宇宙(マクロコスモ), Makuro Kosumo) that awakens their Omega Cloths.
Aquila Yuna (鷲座(アクィラ)のユナ, Akwira no Yuna)
Voiced by: Satsuki Yukino
The female Saint of the Eagle constellation, a 13-year-old girl (14 in Season 2) and war orphan. Departing from Kurumada's manga, the Aquila Saint is ranked as a Bronze Saint in Omega. Yuna aims to become a true and strong Saint, but strongly opposes the implied rule that female Saints should remain in a life of secrecy. She originally wore the mask of the female Saints, mandatory for them in the presence of males, but now fights without a mask. She commands the element of Wind and later learns to perform a dual attack with Souma, combining their cosmo into a massive, spiraling wave of flames.
Lionet Souma (仔獅子座(ライオネット)の蒼摩, Raionetto no Sōma)
Voiced by: Katsuyuki Konishi
A 14-year-old boy (15 in Season 2), Koga's best friend and trusted partner, the Lionet Bronze Saint of the future generation. With a bright and cheerful personality, Souma is also emotional and prone to lose his temper, he commands the element of Fire. Souma seeks to avenge his father, a Silver Saint who was murdered by Mars' own daughter, Hornet Sonia, only to witness firsthand at the Darkness temple her own tragic history. Through a series of trials of battles, including training under the retired Unicorn Saint Jabu, Souma battles Sonia as the newly christened Scorpio Saint, attempting to both defeat and save her from her delusions. Despite attaining his Seventh Sense, he is unable to save Sonia from the out of control power of her Cloth, comforting her as she dies. After Mars' defeat, he becomes an instructor at the Paleastra until the appearance of the Pallasites forces him to return to battle.
Dragon Ryuhou (龍座(ドラゴン)の龍峰, Doragon no Ryūhō)
Voiced by: Tetsuya Kakihara
A 12-year-old boy (13 in Season 2), friend to Koga, who considers him almost his brother, the Dragon Bronze Saint in the future era. Very caring of others by nature, Ryuhou suffers from a frail health. Calm and polite, he has a natural talent for becoming a formidable Saint, but he is affected by his condition. He received the Dragon Cloth from his father, the legendary Dragon Shiryu. The young Ryuhou commands the element of Water. After Genbu's death, Geki entrusts the Libra Cloth to Ryuhou so that he can give it to his father.
Wolf Haruto (狼座(ウルフ)の栄斗, Urufu no Haruto)
Voiced by: Tatsuhisa Suzuki
The young Bronze Saint of the Wolf constellation. Descendant of shinobi, a smart and knowledgeable 14-year-old boy (15 in Season 2). Stoic, Haruto aims to become a strong Saint. With a calm personality, he blends the shinobi arts with the ancient fighting style of the Saints. He becomes a singer after the battle with Mars, although returns to being the Wolf Saint after his first public show is ruined by the Pallasites. He commands the element of Earth.
Orion Eden (オリオン座のエデン, Orion-za no Eden)
Voiced by: Junichi Suwabe
An enigmatic young man, the Orion Saint in the future era. Eden is 15 years old (16 in Season 2). Mysterious and distant, Eden believes in the dominance of the strong and disregards the weak, putting his faith in his own strength. Unlike in Kurumada's mythos, in which the Orion Saint belongs to the Silver Saint ranks, in Omega, the Orion Saint is ranked as a Bronze Saint. He is later revealed to be Mars' son and Sonia's younger brother, Eden defeats Koga in a battle of strength taking Aria back to Mars and is later shown heartbroken at Aria's death at the hands of his own father, eventually deciding to join forces with Koga and the others to stop his plans. Following the defeat of Abzu, Eden starts working with Pallas' servants and join their ranks as a Teriary Pallasite, wielding a club called the Impulse Mace (インパルス・メイス, Inparusu Meisu), upon being promised by them that they shall eventually revive Aria and his family for him. However it is revealed that he never intended to align with them and was working as a spy for the Sanctuary, and in the occasion, he discards his Chronetector and dons his new Orion Cloth. Eden commands the element of Thunder. After protecting Koga and the others from Europa, he finally decides to travel along with them while keeping an eye on Subaru who surprised him with a massive amount of Cosmo. When Koga and the other Bronze Saints meet Celeris and Selene, Eden learns what it means to have someone to protect. Eden is very much like Ikki in the original series: he usually keeps a distance from his fellow Bronze Saints and appears to help when it is most crucial. However, he also is very caring for his friends as he protects them from Europa's Terrible Slash, and his friendship with the other Saints increases during the series.
Aria (アリア, Aria)
Voiced by: Mamiko Noto
Aria is a girl who commands the element of Light. She was one of the two infants that Athena protected from Erebus during Seiya's fight with Mars, the other being Koga. In the occasion, she was bathed in Athena's Light and inherited her powers. She was being raised by Mars since then to develop her Light powers as part of his plans to replace Saori with her as the new Athena. After being rescued by Koga, she travels with him and his friends to destroy the several ruins used by Mars to siphon the planet's Cosmo. After the final ruin is destroyed, Aria displays a power comparable with Athena's and makes use of it to confront Mars, but is ultimately killed by him and has her powers absorbed.
Equuleus Subaru (小馬座(エクレウス)の昴, Ekureusu no Subaru)
Voiced by: Yū Mizushima
An energetic twelve-year-old young boy with no memories of his past. Originally a Steel Saint with no memories of his past, Subaru dreams of one day become as powerful as a god. He has little sense of duty towards Athena at first, determined to prove himself by defeating Koga, who became notorious following his triumph over Abzu, but eventually becomes more responsible and friendly during his travels with him. Among the Steel Saints, Subaru has the strongest Cosmo, and it is hinted that he might eventually obtain his own guardian constellation and become one of Athena's Saints. This is confirmed when he eventually learns to perform his own Cosmo-powered technique known as the Pleiades Impact and inherits the Equuleus Clothstone from a dying Celeris. The true nature of Subaru's powers are shrouded in mystery as he sometimes displays surges of overwhelming Cosmo when he is overtaken with fury and manages to restore and upgrade the Equuleus Cloth despite not having achieved the Seventh Sense, drawing the attention of Eden, who finds something familiar in his Cosmo. He is ultimately revealed to be Saturn, having turned himself into a human boy to bide his time.

== Athena's Saints ==
=== Bronze Saints ===
Hydra Ichi (海蛇座(ヒドラ)の市, Hidora no Ichi)
Voiced by: Masaya Onosaka
A long-time friend and comrade-in-arms to Sagittarius Seiya, Ichi is the oldest student in the Palestra in the era of Omega. Ichi is still trying to discover the element of his Cosmo. He pleads allegiance to Caelum Michelangelo in exchange of being promoted to the Silver Saint ranks, and receives Hydrus as his new constellation and becoming Hydrus Ichi (水蛇座(ヒドラス)の市, Hidorasu no Ichi). Despite his promotion, he is defeated in battle by Koga and his Silver Cloth is destroyed. Following the battle with Abzu, a reformed Ichi returns to the Palaestra and regains his old cloth to "assist" Geki with the new recruits' training.
Dorado Spear (かじき座(ドラド)のスピア, Dorado no Supia)
Voiced by: Yūsei Oda
The Bronze Saint of the Dorado constellation, still a student in the Palaestra at Sanctuary, the leader of a small gang formed by himself, Caribou Rudolph and Columba Gray. He tests himself and his skills against Aquila Yuna. Spear commands the element of Water, used as a razor-sharp weapon.
Volans Argo (飛び魚座のアルゴ, Tobiuo-za no Arugo)
Voiced by: Nobutoshi Canna
The Volans Bronze Saint, fellow student of Koga and Souma, to whom he is hostile. Argo commands the element of Water.
Compass Hooke (コンパス座のフック, Conpasu-za no Fukku)
Voiced by: Yūsuke Numata
The bespectacled Compass Bronze Saint, the first rival faced by Koga in the Saint Fights, after Souma's first round victory. He commands the element of Earth.
Corona Borealis Dali (冠座のダリ, Kanmuri-za no Dari)
The Corona Borealis Bronze Saint, easily defeated with one hit by Orion Eden. He commands the element of Wind.
Delphinus Güney (イルカ座(デルフィネス)のギュネイ, Derufinesu no Gyunei)
Voiced by: Hiromu Miyazaki
The Delphinus Bronze Saint, the first opponent faced by Aquila Yuna in the Saint Fights, before whom he fell in battle. Güney commands the element of Water.
Apus Paradise (風鳥座のパラダイス, Fūchō no Paradaisu)
Voiced by: Ryusuke Kanemoto
The Apus Bronze Saint, who was defeated by Orion Eden in the Saint Fights tournament.
Lynx Mirapolos (山猫座(リンクス)のミラポロス, Rinkusu no Miraporosu)
Voiced by: Yūki Tai
The Lynx Bronze Saint in the milieu of Omega. He was Dragon Ryuhou's training partner during their days at the Palaestra, until they parted ways when he sought to become a Gold Saint. He supposedly never returned to Palaestra, but reappears as an apparition of the Darkness temple in front of Ryuhou.
Wolf Yoshitomi (狼座(ウルフ)の芳臣, Urufu no Yoshitomi)
Voiced by: Tsuyoshi Takishita
Formerly a Ninja of the Fuji Style, and the Wolf Bronze Saint before his cousin Haruto. Haruto saw him as an older brother, and was emotionally destroyed after his death.
Equuleus Celeris (小馬座(エクレウス)のケレリス, Ekureusu no Kererisu)
Voiced by: Yoshito Yasuhara
The Equuleus Bronze Saint, whose Cloth is said to be cursed, but Celeris does not believe in such superstition. He joins the assault on Pallasvelda with the others, but instead protects others rather than fighting directly. He refers to Koga as "Bro" as the Pegasus and Equuleus constellations are said to be older and younger brothers, respectively. Celeris inherited the Equuleus Cloth from Kitalpha. He dies in order to defeat Hati once and for all using Supernova Explosion Maximum.
Equuleus Kitalpha (小馬座(エクレウス)のキタルファ, Ekureusu no Kitarufa)
Voiced by: Tokuyoshi Kawashima
The Equuleus Bronze Saint before Celeris, he came to Pallasvelda some time in the past to battle the Pallasites and came upon both Celeris and Selene being attacked by a large group of Pallasites. He defeats the Pallasites using the Supernova Explosion Maximum, sacrificing himself in the process. It is through this selflessness that Celeris sees that the power of Equuleus comes from fighting for others when they are at their lowest.

=== Silver Saints ===
Ophiuchus Shaina (蛇遣い座(オピュクス)のシャイナ, Opyukusu no Shaina)
Voiced by: Mami Koyama
The female Silver Saint of the Ophiuchus constellation, and long time comrade-in-arms of Sagittarius Seiya. Mentor to Koga. After convalescing from her wounds caused by Mars, she reveals to Koga the secret of his and Aria's origin, although the attack left her unable to use her cloth. After being cured of her darkness wound following Mars' defeat, she returns to her position as the Ophiuchus Saint, leading the security around Athena.
Southern Cross Kazuma (南十字座(サザンクロス)の一摩, Sazan Kurosu no Kazuma)
Voiced by: Toshio Furukawa
A powerful Silver Saint and Souma's father, who was killed by Hornet Sonia in the past in front of him. His memory constantly haunts Souma and Sonia.
Hound Miguel (猟犬座(ハウンド)のミゲル, Haundo no Migeru)
Voiced by: Yasunori Matsumoto
The Silver Saint of the Hound constellation, loyal to Mars. Miguel commands the element of Earth. With great superiority over the Bronze Saints at first, he tries to capture Aria, but is defeated by the Bronze Saints after a fierce battle. He later turned up alive in the Sanctuary, re-swearing his allegiance to Athena.
Crow Johann (烏座(クロウ)のヨハン, Kurō no Yohan)
Voiced by: Kentarō Itō
Commanding the element of Wind, the Silver Saint of the Crow constellation, teammate of Hound Miguel, also loyal to Mars. After being defeated by the bronze saints, he later turned up alive in the Sanctuary, re-swearing his allegiance to Athena.
Musca Fry (蝿座(ムスカ)のフライ, Musuka no Furai)
Voiced by: Kōzō Shioya
The traitorous, overweight Musca Silver Saint, who tries to steal Koga and Yuna's Bronze Cloths, to be promoted within Mars' ranks. Defeated and killed by Koga after a difficult battle.
Peacock Pavlín (孔雀座(ピーコック)のパブリーン, Pīkokku no Paburīn)
Voiced by: Ai Orikasa
The female Pavo Silver Saint, and Aquila Yuna's mentor. She first poses as loyal to Mars, while secretly remaining a true Saint, faithful to Athena. She reveals to Yuna Athena's whereabouts at the risk of her life. Pavlín commands the element of Wind. It is unknown if she survived the war against Mars.
Sagitta Sham (矢座(サジッタ)のシャム, Sajitta no Shamu)
Voiced by: Hiroshi Okamoto
The Sagitta Silver Saint, who betrayed Athena and engages Peacock Pavlín in battle.
Auriga Almaaz (馭者座(アウリガ)のアルマーズ, Auriga no Arumāzu)
Voiced by: Daisuke Matsubara
The Auriga Silver Saint in the era of Omega, who also betrayed Athena. He tries to kill Peacock Pavlín as he considers her a traitor to Mars.
Reticulum Balazo (レチクル座のバラーゾ, Rechikuru-za no Barāzo)
Voiced by: Go Takahashi
The Reticulum Silver Saint, companion of Auriga Almaaz and Sagitta Sham. He is sent along them to punish Peacock Pavlín for her betrayal.
Caelum Michelangelo (彫刻具座(カエルム)のミケランジェロ, Kaerumu no Mikeranjero)
The Caelum Silver Saint in the era of Omega, who betrayed Athena. He prefers to send his earth-wrought warriors to fight in his stead, choosing to retreat when his defenses are broken.
Kerberos Dorie (地獄の番犬座(ケルベロス)のドーレ, Keruberosu no Dōre)
The Kerberos Silver Saint in the era of Omega, who is sent by Hornet Sonia to capture Aria. He failed in his mission falling before Pegasus Koga after a fierce battle. He later turned up alive in the Sanctuary, re-swearing his allegiance to Athena.
Perseus Mirfak (ペルセウス座のミルファク, Peruseusu-za no Mirufaku)
Voiced by: Eiji Takemoto
The Perseus Silver Saint in the era of Omega, who engages the Bronze Saints in battle. He is defeated by Dragon Ryuhou, in the same way as his father Shiryu defeated his predecessor, Perseus Algol, in Kurumada's manga. He later turned up alive in the Sanctuary, re-swearing his allegiance to Athena.
Scutum Ennead (盾座(スキュータム)のエネアド, Sukyūtamu no Eneado)
Voiced by: Takashi Nagasako
The Scutum Silver Saint in the era of Omega. He tries to prevent Koga and Yuna from rescuing Aria, but falls before a strengthened Lionet Souma.
Camelopardalis Bartschius (キリン座のバルチウス, Kirin-za no Baruchiusu; also called Giraffe (ジラフ, Jirafu))
Voiced by: Eriko Fujimaki
The Camelopardalis Silver Saint in the era of Omega. She is defeated by Wolf Haruto, but later turned up alive in the Sanctuary, re-swearing her allegiance to Athena.
Boötes Bayer (牛飼い座のバイエル, Ushikai-za no Baieru)
Voiced by: Hirofumi Tanaka
The Boötes Silver Saint in the era of Omega. He tries to stop the Bronze Saints but is defeated by Dragon Ryuhou. He later turned up alive in the Sanctuary, re-swearing his allegiance to Athena.
Whale Menkar (鯨座(ホエール)のメンカル, Hoēru no Menkaru; also called "Cetus" (ケタス, Ketasu))
Voiced by: Kōhei Fukuhara
The Whale Silver Saint in the era of Omega, possessing herculean strength. He is defeated by Yuna and Souma while under the leadership of Sonia. He is redeemed during the Pallasite war.

=== Gold Saints ===
Sagittarius Seiya (射手座(サジタリアス)の星矢, Sajitariasu no Seiya)
Voiced by: Tōru Furuya
The titular character and main protagonist in Kurumada's manga and its anime adaptation, Seiya is the Pegasus Bronze Saint of the 20th century. He is now regarded as a legendary Sagittarius Gold Saint in the milieu of Omega. Having defended Athena in the past from powerful enemies and the Underworld God Hades, Seiya continues his mission assisted by the Sagittarius Gold Cloth. Athena entrusted Seiya with the mission to kill Pallas, but he could not find it in himself to do so, resulting in the war between the Saints and Pallasites. Athena then put him in charge of guarding her against any Pallasite attack. Later on, Seiya reveals he has inherited the will and techniques of the former Sagittarius Saint Aiolos.
Capricorn Ionia (山羊座(カプリコーン)のイオニア, Kapurikōn no Ionia)
Voiced by: Ryūzaburō Ōtomo
The principal of the Palaestra, and the aged Capricorn Gold Saint in the era of Omega. Once a master who raised powerful warriors to serve Athena, his harsh training methods turned his disciples against him, forcing Ionia to kill them on self defense. After a long time of self-contaiment to repent for his sins, he is approached by Saori and asks him to become the Headmaster of the Palaestra. However, his urge to relieve Saori from her duty of protecting the world, releasing her from all the pain and suffering it brings her, leads him to sworn allegiance to Mars and take part in his plan. He is ultimately defeated and killed by Koga when the young Saint overcomes his darkness Cosmo and attains the Seventh Sense.
Leo Mycenae (獅子座(レオ)のミケーネ, Reo no Mikēne)
Voiced by: Yutaka Nakano
The Leo Gold Saint in the era of Omega. Mycenae has sworn allegiance to Mars and his false Athena, becoming an overwhelming threat to the young Bronze Saints. When confronted by Souma and Haruto in the House of Leo, he recognizes their bravery and allows them to push forward instead. Later he confronts Medea whom he labels as the true mastermind behind Mars' intent to destroy the Earth, only to be killed by her brother, Pisces Amor.
Libra Genbu (天秤座(ライブラ)の玄武, Raibura no Genbu)
Voiced by: Nobuyuki Hiyama
The Libra Gold Saint in the era of Omega. Genbu arrives to the Lushan waterfall to retrieve the Libra Gold Cloth, which he considers rightfully his, as the Libra Gold Saint. He is revealed to have been a former student of Dohko and originally left the path of a Saint, only to carry on the path Shiryu would have originally taken had he not lost all of his senses. As Genbu states, the Libra Cloth chose him to be the bearer, which he now uses on Athena's behalf just like Dohko and Shiryu did before him. After defeating Aquarius Tokisada, he decides to join the Bronze Saints' fight but when Medea upsets the balance that maintains the Twelve Houses, he is forced to stay behind to prevent them from collapse. In the war against Pallas, Genbu becomes the commanding officer of the forces of Palaestra where many outsiders have come to take refuge. In the Pallasite's attack on Palaestra, Genbu faces off against Aegir, who wields Hyperion's Holy Sword, and launches and attack to destroy the weapon at the cost of his own life, but even by sacrificing himself, Genbu only manages to slightly damage it. Following his death, the Libra Clothstone is entrusted to Ryuhou, who later returns it to his father, certain that it would be Genbu's will.
Aries Kiki (牡羊座(アリエス)の貴鬼, Ariesu no Kiki)
Voiced by: Shigeru Nakahara
From Kurumada's original manga, the former apprentice of the legendary Mu, the Aries Gold Saint in the 20th century. Now a young man, Kiki is mentor to Raki, and the Aries Gold Saint in the era of Omega. As his mentor was, Kiki is well-versed in the arts of Cloth restoration and just as Mu did in the original saga, he reinforces the Bronze saints' Cloths before allowing them to proceed toward the remaining houses. He later returns during the assault on Pallasvelda accompanying Saori and restores Koga and his friends's Cloths once more to let them keep pushing forward. Kiki sacrifices himself alongside Fudou and Shiryu to defeat Hyperion using the forbidden skill Athena Exclamation. However, it is later revealed that he survived.
Taurus Harbinger (牡牛座(タウラス)のハービンジャー, Taurasu no Hābinjā)
Voiced by: Kazuki Yao
The Taurus Gold Saint in the era of Omega. Having endured a difficult childhood and the loss of an eye, he turned to a life of crime and violence, seeking to become the strongest, developing a brutal fighting style based on the breaking of bones, which he considers define the character of a person. Harbinger was later recruited by Capricorn Ionia to become a Gold Saint. Even though the Bronze Saints fail to defeat him, he allows them to pass, claiming that he hopes to fight them once more when they grow stronger. Harbinger remains the Taurus Saint following Mars' defeat, and despite being considered the least reliable of all the remaining Gold Saints, Harbinger is entrusted with Athena's Cloth by Saori, with orders to protect it until the time comes for her to use it. After the battle with Pallas and Saturn he is entrusted with the role of Great Pope and rebuild the sanctuary, a position he begrudgingly accepts.
Cancer Schiller (蟹座(キャンサー)のシラー, Kyansā no Shirā)
Voiced by: Taiki Matsuno
The Cancer Gold Saint in the era of Omega. Bloodthirsty and merciless, he welcomes the challenge of Aquila Yuna and is defeated and ultimately killed by her when she awakens her Seventh Sense.
Virgo Fudo (乙女座(バルゴ)の不動, Barugo no Fudō)
Voiced by: Tomokazu Seki
The Virgo Gold Saint in the era of Omega. His eyes display heterochromia. Viewed by Mars as the incarnation of the fabled Acala, the ferocious and immovable guardian of Buddhist doctrine. He blocks the Bronze Saints' path to Mars until Eden appears to challenge him, allowing the others to keep pressing forward. Fudo also allows Eden to proceed after confirming his determination to stop his father's plans. After Mars' defeat, Fudo swears his allegiance to Athena, becoming the true Virgo saint. Fudo sacrifices himself alongside Kiki and Shiryu to defeat Hyperion using the forbidden skill Athena Exclamation. However, it is later revealed that he survived.
Aquarius Tokisada (水瓶座(アクエリアス)の時貞, Akueriasu no Tokisada)
Voiced by: Shō Hayami
The Aquarius Gold Saint in the era of Omega. A man with command over time, Tokisada conceals his features behind a mask, and pursued and battled Yoshitomi years ago. He received the Aquarius Gold Cloth from Medea after he pledged his allegiance to Mars. Previously he was ranked as a Silver Saint, and known as Horologium Tokisada (時計座(ホロロギウム)の時貞, Hororogiumu no Tokisada). After being defeated by Libra Genbu, Tokisada drags Haruto and Ryuhou to the end of time where he is defeated by Haruto, who finally manages to avenge his friend by awakening his Seventh Sense. Tokisada returns as a Secondary Pallasite, having apparently been saved from the end of time by his new Chrono Tector. As a Pallasite, he wields a clock known as the Death Watch (デスウォッチ, Desu Wotchi) that directs his time-based powers, which he now uses as an armor. He easily holds his own against Eden and Haruto, but Subaru's mysterious Cosmo distracts him long enough for Hyoga to arrive, pitting the former Aquarius Saints against each other. Hyoga's Absolute Zero Cold Air is too strong for Tokisada's Chrono Dominion, and Tokisada is left frozen solid.
Scorpio Sonia (蠍座(スコーピオン)のソニア, Sukōpion no Sonia)
Voiced by: Aya Hisakawa
The Scorpio Saint in the era of Omega. Mars' daughter and Eden's older sister, one of the High Martians (高位火星士(ハイマーシアン), Hai Māshian), who encounters Aquila Yuna during her escape with Aria under her previous title of Hornet Sonia (ホーネットのソニア, Hōnetto no Sonia). She is the young female warrior who killed Lionet Souma's father years ago. Later she is entrusted with the Scorpion Cloth by her step-mother Medea. However her inability to contain the Cloth's overwhelming power culminates in her death when she fights Souma, despite his best attempt to save her after attaining his Seventh Sense.
Pisces Amor (魚座(ピスケス)のアモール, Pisukesu no Amōru)
Voiced by: Akira Ishida
The Pisces Gold Saint in the era of Omega. He is Medea's younger brother and is aware of her plan to deceive Mars to destroy the world. By Medea's request, he sets a trap for Koga, forcing him to watch his friends being attacked by Amor and Mars' four War Gods, which were resurrected by him, while he is restrained by several darkness spikes that can only be broken by Darkness Cosmo, forcing Koga to break the promise he made to Aria and awaken the Darkness Cosmo inside him by his own volition. He is eventually killed by Koga, fully possessed by Abzu, by punching a hole through his stomach.
Gemini Integra (双子座(ジェミニ)のインテグラ, Jemini no Integura)
Voiced by: Yukana
Paradox's twin sister who replaces her as the Gemini Gold Saint, identical in every way other than their eye colors. She appears to protect Ryuhou from Paradox when she returns as a Pallasite and drives her away with his help. Instead of accompanying Saori and the other saints through Pallas' fortress, she goes ahead determined to settle her dispute with her sister once and for all.
Libra Shiryu (天秤座(ライブラ)の紫龍, Raibura no Shiryū)
Voiced by: Ken Narita
Dragon Ryuhou's father and the previous Dragon Bronze Saint, who fought alongside Pegasus Seiya to protect Athena and Earth in the holy wars of the 20th century, regarded as a hero and legendary Saint in the era of Omega, where he was also chosen as the Libra Saint. He suffered the loss of all his senses in the battle against Mars and now only perceives his surroundings through the use of his Cosmo, remaining in a vegetative and meditative state, and during this time his title was replaced by his fellow disciple, Genbu, to fight against Mars, until Abzu's defeat washes away the corruption in his body restoring his Senses as well. Ryuhou attempts to return the Dragon Cloth to him, although Shiryu declines, claiming that it now belongs to his son. Having no Cloth to fight the Pallasites, Shiryu stands on the backlines during the attack on Pallasvelda, attending to the wounded Saints, until his son gives him the Libra Clothstone, allowing Shiryu to officially assume the title of the Libra Saint. Shiryu sacrifices himself alongside Aries Kiki and Virgo Fudo to destroy Hyperion's sword using the forbidden skill Athena Exclamation. However, it is later revealed that he survived.

=== Steel Saints ===
The Steel Saints (鋼鉄聖闘士(スチールセイント), Suchīru Seinto) are Mitsumasa Kido's technologically enhanced special backup unit for Athena's Saints, created decades ago. The Steel Saints wear specially developed mechanical armors, known as the Steel Cloths (鋼鉄聖衣(スチールクロス), Suchīru Kurosu), which do not require mastery over Cosmo to be worn. Most Steel Saints are equal in power to a Quaternary Pallasite, thus helping Athena's Saints against their overwhelming numbers. The current generation of Steel Saints Cloths are based on those of the three Original Steel Saints (初代鋼鉄聖闘士(オリジナル・スチールセイント), Orijinaru Suchīru Seinto).

Erna (エルナ, Eruna)
Voiced by: Ryoko Shiraishi
Erna is one of Subaru's classmates from the Steel Saint training. As he is aware that he, like all Steel Saints, does not have a Guardian Constellation, Erna has drawn a star on his Steel Cloth instead to give him the same hope of protection. Erna is killed by Hati while protecting Subaru, and since then his Steel Cloth is used by Subaru in his memory.
Kerry (ケリー, Kerī)
Voiced by: Keiji Hirai
One of the Steel Saints who assists in the assault on Pallasvelda, protecting his partner Emma. He feels that the battle against Pallas is fruitless, but fights anyway in honor to his deceased wife and child. He has modified his Steel Cloth to include Steel Bolt Arrows on both of his fists and is killed while protecting Emma and a wounded Souma.
Emma (エマ, Ema)
Voiced by: Yukiyo Fujii
One of the Steel Saints who participates in the assault on Pallasvelda. Although she is not as strong as the other Steel Saints, she successfully assists Souma and Subaru in their fight against one of the Pallasites.
Ushio (潮)
Voiced by: Hōchū Ōtsuka
One of the Original Steel Saints, and wearer of the Marine Cloth (マリンクロス, Marin Kurosu), modeled after the Dorado Cloth. He, Shou, and Daichi hold off Dione while Koga and his friends' Cloths are restored. He calls Subaru the "Steel Saints' Star of Hope" after discovering the boy has become a Bronze Saint.
Daichi (大地)
Voiced by: Daiki Nakamura
One of the Original Steel Saints, and wearer of the Land Cloth (ランドクロス, Rando Kurosu), modeled after the Vulpecula Cloth.
Shou (翔, Shō)
Voiced by: Shigeru Nakahara
One of the Original Steel Saints, and wearer of the Sky Cloth (スカイクロス, Sukai Kurosu), modeled after the Toucan Cloth. He, Ushio, and Daichi are sortied out by Professor Asamori to battle in Pallasvelda while the Bronze Saints' Cloths are restored.
Geki (檄)
Voiced by: Kiyoyuki Yanada
The former Bear Bronze Saint and long-time friend and comrade-in-arms to Sagittarius Seiya, now mentor to young Saint apprentices in the era of Omega, in the Palaestra (パライストラ, Paraisutora), the instruction grounds of Sanctuary. He trained Lionet Souma to become a Saint. He is later given a Steel Cloth modeled after his former Bear Cloth to battle the Pallasites in Pallasvelda.
Ban (蛮)
Voiced by: Tetsu Inada
Ban is an instructor at the Steel Saint training school and is the former wearer of the Lionet Cloth from when Seiya was the wearer of the Pegasus Cloth. After the training school is attacked by the Pallasites, he returns to Palaestra to help it prepare for battle. He is later given a Steel Cloth modeled after his former Lionet Cloth to join the battle in Pallasvelda.
Nachi (那智)
Voiced by: Bin Shimada
Nachi is an instructor at the Steel Saint training school and is the former wearer of the Wolf Cloth from Seiya's youth. Upon returning to Palaestra after the attack on the training school, he is happy to see that Haruto, the current wearer of the Wolf Cloth, is partnered up with Koga, the current wearer of the Pegasus Cloth. He is later given a Steel Cloth modeled after his former Wolf Cloth to join the battle in Pallasvelda.
Unicorn Jabu (一角獣座(ユニコーン)の邪武, Yunikōn no Jabu)
Voiced by: Takeshi Kusao
From Kurumada's original manga, the Unicorn Bronze Saint and long-time friend and comrade-in-arms to Sagittarius Seiya. He has since retired and become a rancher, tending to numerous horses. Jabu helps Lionet Souma to become stronger by further training him, drawing from his long experience as a Saint and his mastery over Cosmo. He later returns in the second season as a Steel Saint, wearing a Steel Coth modelled after his former Unicorn Cloth to join the battle at the Pallasvelda.

=== Legendary Saints ===
Andromeda Shun (アンドロメダ座の瞬, Andoromeda no Shun)
Voiced by: Hiroshi Kamiya
The legendary Andromeda Bronze Saint, who fought alongside Sagittarius Seiya to protect Athena from fearsome foes, years ago. He also battled Mars when he first manifested himself. Having become a doctor, Shun travels between impoverished villages, treating their sick free of charge. He also provides the traveling funds used by Koga and the other Saints. Shun was afflicted by the same "dark wound" that affects Athena, and thus, his ability to manipulate his Cosmo had greatly diminished, as well as being unable to don his Cloth. After Abzu's defeat, Shun regains the ability to use his Cloth and during a confrontation with the Pallasites his Cloth evolves, restoring it from its Cloth Stone form. Shun later rejoins his old companions during the assault on Pallasvelda.
Cygnus Hyoga (白鳥座(キグナス)の氷河, Kigunasu no Hyōga)
Voiced by: Mamoru Miyano
Also one of the Saints of legend from the generation of the 20th century, who fought for Athena in the divine battles for the fate of Earth. Hyoga is also afflicted by the same "dark wound" suffered by Athena, Shiryu, and Shun, and he meets Koga after his defeat at the hands of Eden, being able to restore the young Saint's confidence in himself. Hyoga later rejoins his old companions during the assault on Pallasvelda. He manages to hold his own against Tokisada as a Pallasite, as both are former wearers of the Gold Aquarius Cloth, but Hyoga's Absolute Zero Cold Air beats Tokisada's Chrono Domination, leaving the disgraced former Gold Saint frozen solid, seemingly calling upon the Aquarius Cloth's strength to turn the tides of battle.
Phoenix Ikki (鳳凰座(フェニックス)の一輝, Fenikkusu no Ikki)
Voiced by: Tomokazu Sugita
Andromeda Shun's older brother and the strongest among the legendary Bronze Saints of the 20th century. He fought against Mars when he first manifested himself, also witnessing Koga and Aria's advent to Earth, years ago, but unlike Seiya and the others, his current whereabouts are still a mystery, even to Shun. He is seen in several flashbacks, most of the flashbacks referring to Athena and the legendary Saints fighting Mars and his Mars Kings for the first time, with Ikki dealing with Vulcanus, using his legendary Ho Yoku Tensho. He later returns to assist in the assault on Pallasvelda and warns Koga and the others of an enemy who is an even greater threat then Pallas. When Koga, Souma, Yuna, and Shun are easily beaten by Aegaeon in his Graviton Tector, Ikki arrives, once more, taking on the Primary Pallasite on his own. Ikki ultimately sacrifices himself to kill Aegaeon once and for all. However, it is later revealed that he survived.
The Old Master (老師, Rōshi)
Voiced by: Kōji Yada
Shiryu's venerable mentor and the legendary Libra Gold Saint who along Aries Shion became the only survivors of the Holy War against Hades in the 18th century, when he was known as Libra Dohko (天秤座(ライブラ)の童虎, Raibura no Dōko). A veteran of two Holy Wars, the Old Master briefly appears in a flashback taking place before the era of Omega.

== Support characters ==
Saori Kido (城戸 紗織, Kido Saori)/Athena (女神(アテナ), Atena)
Voiced by: Shoko Nakagawa
The Greek Goddess of Justice, Wisdom, and Heroic Endeavor, who always returns when evil consumes Earth. She took care of the orphaned Koga as his foster mother and still follows her duty of maintaining the peace on Earth assisted by her saints.
Tokumaru Tatsumi (辰巳 徳丸, Tatsumi Tokumaru)
Voiced by: Yukitoshi Hori
Saori's long time butler, still her faithful servant in the universe of Omega. He still keeps his shinai to protect Saori as he did in the past.
Raki (羅喜)
Voiced by: Ai Maeda
A young girl from the people of Jamir with psychokinesis, who helps the Bronze Saints and Aria during their journey. Raki is apprentice to Aries Kiki, in a same fashion as Kiki was the apprentice of his predecessor, Aries Mu.
Sea King Poseidon (海王ポセイドン, Kaiō Poseidon) and Siren Sorrento (セイレーンのソレント, Seirēn no Sorento)
Voiced by: Keiichi Nanba and Yoku Shioya, respectively (videogame only)
Poseidon and Sorrento, characters from the original Saint Seiya manga and anime, appear in the video game Saint Seiya Omega: Ultimate Cosmo as supporting characters.
The Bronze Saints of Palaestra
Caribou Rudolph (馴鹿座(カリブー)のルドルフ, Karibū no Rudorufu)
Norma Luciano (定規座のルチアーノ, Jōgi-za no Ruchiāno)
Columba Gray (鳩座(コロンバ)のグレイ, Koronba no Gurei)
Lepus Arné (ウサギ座のアルネ, Usagi-za no Arune)
Crane Komachi (鶴座(クレイン)の小町, Kurein no Komachi)
Acting Principal (学園長代理, Gakuenchō Dairi)
Voiced by: Naomi Kusumi
One of the officers in charge of overseeing the Palaestra. Though he doesn't look it, he was a Saint in the past, days that seem long gone.
Georges (ゲオルゲス, Georugesu)
Voiced by: Masaya Takatsuka
One of the members of the teaching staff at the Palaestra, who initially acts with disdain somewhat, towards Koga.
Chunli (春麗; Hepburn: Shunrei, pinyin: Chūn Lí)
Voiced by: Konami Yoshida
From Kurumada's manga, Dragon Shiryu's girlfriend from his teenage years. In the era of Omega, his wife and mother of Ryuhou.
Ray (レイ, Rei)
Voiced by: Minami Tsuda
Rei is a young boy who is in the town attacked by Halimede and is Philip's younger brother. In the attack by Halimede, Rei is protected by Philip and ultimately saved by Andromeda Shun.
Philip (フィリップ, Firippu)
Voiced by: Nanao Shindō
Philip is a young boy who is in the town attacked by Halimede and is Ray's older brother. Philip does his best to save his brother from Halimede, but he is frozen in time by the Pallasite's Chronotector before Andromeda Shun can save him.
Zenzo (善三, Zenzō)
Voiced by: Kōtarō Nakamura
Zenzo Masataka Morigakure (森隠善三正孝, Morigakure Zenzō Masataka) is Haruto's father and his teacher in the ninja arts. While it appears that he looks down on his son for becoming a Saint instead of following the family way, he is proud of Haruto regardless.
Shinzoku (親族)
Voiced by: Keiji Hirai
A Fuji Style Ninja, Yoshitomi's father and Zenzo's younger brother.
Selene (セレーネ, Serēne)
Voiced by: Mariko Honda
Selene is one of many civilians living in Pallasvelda protected by Celeris, and in turn she helps nurse Celeris back to help after each time. Despite being so young herself, she acts as a mother figure to the other refugees and tries to keep strong for their sakes.
Professor Asamori (麻森博士, Asamori-hakase)
Voiced by: Tomohisa Asō
Professor Asamori is the inventor of the Steel Cloths, having intended for them to assist Athena's Saints with able warriors who do not possess any Cosmo. After creating the Land, Marine, and Sky Cloths, he perfected the process and mass-produced Steel Cloths. During the battles in Pallasvelda, Professor Asamori decides to sortie out Daichi, Ushio, and Shō, the first ever Steel Saints.

== Martians ==
Mars, the God of War (戦いの神マルス, Tatakai no Kami Marusu)
Voiced by: Hidekatsu Shibata
The god of war Mars who was sealed by Seiya years ago, whose resurrection was imminent. To build his ideal world, he attempts to kidnap Athena, to achieve domination. He wears the powerful armor known as Galaxy (銀河衣(ギャラクシー), Gyarakushī). Once he was Ludwig (ルードヴィグ, Rūdovigu), an important businessman known who fell into despair and rage upon the death of his first wife Misha (ミーシャ, Mīsha) during a terrorist attack. Even after hunting down all involved in the attack, his desire to bring true justice to the world at any cost made of him the perfect vessel for Mars. After being defeated by Koga and Eden, Mars tries to retrieve Aria's staff, but he is killed before he can do anything.
Medea (メディア, Media)
Voiced by: Yoshiko Sakakibara
Eden's birth mother, Sonia Step-mother and Mars' wife. Medea is also referred to as the Imperial Sorceress (聖なる魔女, Seinaru Majo) by Mars. In the battle between Athena and Mars, Medea summons a meteorite composed of darkness that causes every Saint to get elemental powers. She and her brother Amor intended to use the war god to fuse his and Koga's Darkness Cosmo to awaken their true master Abzu. As Abzu is about to kill Eden, Medea stands in his way, and is killed as she sacrifices her own life in order to try protect her son.
Abzu, the God of Darkness (闇の神アプス, Yami no Kami Apusu)
The god that rules darkness in Babylonian mythology. He is aware of Medea's schemes and takes possession of Koga's body, though he is later expelled by the efforts of Seiya and Yuna and vanquished completely in a climactic battle with Koga.

=== Martians ===
The Martians (火星士(マーシアン), Māshian), or Mars Knights, are Mars' warriors. Each wears an armor themed after an insect.

Mantis Ordykia (マンティスのオルデュキア, Mantisu no Orudyukia)
Voiced by: Yasunori Masutani
One of the Martians, a member of their scout troops. Defeated by Koga and Souma and later killed by a shadowy figure.
Spider Ragno (スパイダーのラーニョ, Supaidā no Rānyo)
Voiced by: Kenji Akabane
One of the Martians, who commands several underlings.
Beetle Brothers (ビートル兄弟, Bītoru Kyōdai)
Voiced by: Tomohisa Hashizume (elder), Daisuke Matsubara (younger)
A pair of Martians who attack Palaestra, fighting Koga and Haruto.
Ant Radzinsky (アントのラジンスキー, Anto no Rajinsukī)
Voiced by: Nobuo Tobita
He leads a small cadre of Martians and battles Koga, Souma, Yuna, and Haruto all at once in the sea.

=== Mars' Four Heavenly Kings ===
Mars' Four Heavenly Kings (マルス四天王, Marusu Shitennō): are the collective of the four most powerful warriors of Mars' army. Originally defeated by Seiya and his companions, they are brought back to life by Pisces Amor to help him deal with Koga and his friends.

Bacchus (バックス, Bakkusu)
Voiced by: Keiji Hirai
Bacchus possesses a giant wine barrel from which he gets his power, such as his ability to perform Zui Quan, and can control the flow of water with Water Cosmo. In the past, he was defeated by Ikki, and he still has an Arrow of Light in his left chest. He faces off against Ryuhou, Souma, and Haruto until Koga's Darkness Cosmo obliterates him in a single blow.
Romulus (ロムルス, Romurusu)
Voiced by: Ryōhei Arai
The leader of Mars' Four Heavenly Kings who has control over Earth Cosmo. In the past, Shiryu was the one to finally defeat him, and has two Arrows of Light in his left chest. Souma, Haruto, and Ryuhou manage to defeat him on their own.
Vulcanus (ウゥルカーヌス, Wurukānusu)
Voiced by: Kōta Nemoto
The Fire Cosmo wielder of Mars' Four Heavenly Kings who uses a kusarigama to manipulate the flames to where not even an absolute zero temperature could stop him. He was defeated by Hyoga in the past, and has an Arrow of Light in his left chest and one in his right shoulder. The collective efforts of Souma, Haruto, and Ryuhou take him down once more.
Diana (ディアーナ, Diāna)
Voiced by: Umeka Shōji
The only woman amongst Mars' Four Heavenly Kings, Diana wields a Cosmo archer's bow in battle. In the past, Shun was the one to defeat her, and she still has an Arrow of Light in her left stomach. It is the combined efforts of Souma, Haruto, and Ryuhou that take her down once more.

== Palladians ==
Pallas (パラス, Parasu)
Voiced by: Hiromi Tsuru
A goddess, whom being Athena's younger sister, has a profound link to her since the ages of myth. Pallas harbors a deep hate towards Athena, and her influence causes Athena's power to wane. She aims to destroy the Saints, and Athena's body and soul. She initially has both a childlike appearance and mannerisms, but as Athena draws closer to end the war between the two, Athena's Cosmo causes Pallas to age into a grown-up state. When Titan is wounded in the fight with Seiya, Pallas ends her fight with Athena to protect Titan as a sign of love for him, revealing to Athena to reconcile with her as Pallas has truly changed her ways.
Pallas's army is composed of warriors known as Pallasites (刻闘士(パラサイト), Parasaito; "Time Fighters") and they wear armors known as Chronotectors (刻衣(クロノテクター), Kuronotekutā), and have command over time, with the capacity of performing the Chrono Delayed (クロノディレイド, Kurono Direido) attack to render anyone whose Cosmo is not strong enough to withstand it motionless, while stealing time from them. Like the Saints' Bronze, Silver, and Gold ratings, the Pallasites are ranked Quaternary (四級, Yonkyū), Tertiary (三級, Sankyū), Secondary (二級, Nikyū), and Primary (一級, Ikkyū); while the Quaternary Pallasites are simple rank-and-file foot soldiers, some disgraced Gold Saints were ranked as Secondary Pallasites and the Primary Pallasites' Chrono Tectors are chimeric forms of three Gold Cloths. Unlike Athena's Saints, who fight barehanded and only a few of them carrying weapons that are rarely used, Pallasites usually fight armed with some kind of weapon.
Saturn, the God of Time (刻の神サターン, Toki no Kami Satān)
Voiced by: Yū Mizushima
Saturn is the being behind Pallas's actions, as well the one the Primary Pallasites, Europa, and Mira, directly swear allegiance to. He created the Chrono Tectors and gave the Primary Pallasites their Holy Swords. In order to examine humanity, he became a human boy: Subaru. After a battle with Koga in space, Saturn realizes that his friends still care about him despite his betrayal and concedes defeat, he regain his faith in humanity, declaring that he is still a Saint, and sends Koga back to Earth.

=== Primary Pallasites ===
Titan (タイタン, Taitan)
Voiced by: Eiji Takemoto
Pallas' quiet and extremely loyal guardian, and a Primary Pallasite. He is one of the Four Heavenly Kings, and is armed with a Holy Sword (聖剣, Seiken; Titan's is also referred to as "Great Sword") known as the Tenjin Genesis Sword (天神創世剣, Tenjin Sōseiken). His Chronotector is known as the Genesis Tector (創世刻衣(ジェネシステクター), Jeneshisu Tekutā), modeled after the Gemini, Virgo, and Sagittarius Gold Cloths. Like the other kings, Titan's real allegiance is not to Pallas, but to another god yet unrevealed who entrusted them with their swords. Despite that, Titan sometimes displays signs of true affection for Pallas, eventually renouncing his allegiance to his true master out of love for her. Titan's sword is destroyed by Harbinger, whose attack forces him to abandon his weapon to protect Pallas.
Hyperion (ハイペリオン, Haiperion)
Voiced by: Takaya Kuroda
Hyperion is one of the Primary Pallasites' Four Heavenly Kings, armed with a Holy Sword known as the Tenchi Destruction Slash (天地崩滅斬, Tenchi Hōmetsuzan) which has a crack inflicted by Libra Genbu before he is killed with it. He looks down on all humanity and believes that Titan is holding back too much in their plans to defeat the Saints. His Chronotector is known as the Destruction Tector (崩滅刻衣(デストラクションテクター), Desutorakushon Tekutā), modeled after the Aries, Taurus, and Leo Gold Cloths. Hyperion's sword is destroyed by Libra Shiryu, Aries Kiki, and Virgo Fudo, who sacrifice their lives to use the forbidden technique of Athena's Exclamation, but he survives the attack and is later confronted and defeated by Koga and the other Bronze Saints after they risk their lives to protect Subaru, reaching the true power of the Omega Cosmo.
Gallia (ガリア, Garia)
Voiced by: Wakana Yamazaki
Gallia is one of the Primary Pallasites' Four Heavenly Kings, armed with a Holy Sword known as the Bushin Photon Sword (武神光臨剣, Bushin Kōrinken). Hyperion refers to her as ruthless, and will kill those who feel have not learned their proper lesson. She manages to hold her own against the Gold Saints until the combined efforts of Paradox and Integra disrupt Europa's technique to keep the Saints separated, and when Athena goes forward with the Gold Saints, her attempts to keep the goddess at bay are thwarted by the seven young Bronze Saints. Although she easily overpowers them, Subaru's mysterious Cosmo disrupts her attack and damages the Bushin Photon Sword slightly. The other Bronze Saints are inspired to pool their powers of friendship and hope against Gallia, using the Omega Cosmo to empower their new Omega Cloths in finally defeating Gallia. Her Chronotector is the Photon Tector (光臨刻衣(フォトンテクター), Foton Tekutā), which is modeled after the Cancer, Aquarius, and Pisces Gold Cloths.
Aegaeon (アイガイオン, Aigaion)
Voiced by: Hisao Egawa
Aegaeon is one of the Primary Pallasites' Four Heavenly Kings, armed with a Holy Sword known as the Graviton Lightning Blade (重爆雷斬刃, Jūbaku Raizanba), which has a chip on it after a clash with Phoenix Ikki. He believes humanity is interesting in the way that they fight, and the other Heavenly Kings believe he is much too kind. During his final battle, Ikki sacrifices himself to defeat Aegaeon for good, after failing to have him reveal the name of his true master. His Chronotector is the Graviton Tector (重爆刻衣(グラビトンテクター), Gurabiton Tekuta), modeled after the Libra, Scorpion, and Capricorn Gold Cloths.

=== Secondary Pallasites ===
Rhea (レア, Rea)
Voiced by: Motoki Takagi
Weapon: Puppets, Perfect Pawn (パーフェクトポーン, Pāfekuto Pōn)
Rhea is a Secondary Pallasite who investigates the battle between Hati and the Saints. His true powers have not been seen, but he is strong enough to catch Koga's Pegasus Meteor Fist with little difficulty. He admits he finds the power of the Pegasus Saint interesting, before leaving, revealing to the Bronze Saints just how much more powerful the Secondary Pallasites are. He appears again facing Shiryu and Ryuhou, showing his powers to use a servant to fool Shiryu long enough for him to strike a powerful blow to the Gold Saint before facing Ryuhou, showing how easy he can handle the Bronze Saint. However, after Ryuhou awakens what appears to be the Omega Cosmo and collapses after destroying the servants, Shiryu defeats and kills Rhea with his legendary Rozan Shoryu Ha.
Dione (ディオネ)
Voiced by: Hiroaki Miura
Weapon: Whip, Snake Plasma (スネークプラズマ, Sunēku Purazuma)
Dione is a Secondary Pallasite and has a gentlemanly demeanor. His appearance harkens that of Pallas, and approaches Kiki to inform him of this fact. His weapon is a whip capable of breaking objects at the atomic level. Dione later appears to attack Kiki, taking advantage of his exhaustion during the process of repairing the cloths of Koga and his friends, but even not being at his peak condition, the Aries Saint easily defeats him, sending him to his death with the Starlight Extinction.
Aegir (エーギル, Ēgiru)
Voiced by: Mitsuaki Madono
Weapon: Gauntlet, Phantom Arm (ファントムアーム, Fantomu Āmu)
Aegir is a Secondary Pallasite armed with a gauntlet called the Phantom Arm, leading the assault on Palaestra under Hyperion's orders. He is the one who challenges Libra Genbu to battle, branding Hyperion's sword. After killing Genbu and losing the sword because Genbu took off a little chip from the sword, he is quickly defeated and seemingly killed by an avenging Koga when he decides to kill the young Pegasus. He later returns, still alive but with an almost destroyed Chronotector. Attacking the Steel Saints, he resurrects his Chronotector and Phantom Arm into a new, more powerful form and easily dominates the Steel Saints. But in the end, he is defeated at the hands, or rather feet, of Unicorn Jabu.
Surtr (スルト, Suruto)
Voiced by: Seiro Ogino
Weapon: Magical Gem, Mystic Stone (ミスティックストーン, Misutikku Sutōn)
Surtr is a Secondary Pallasite armed with a gem known as the Mystic Stone that enables him to produce a barrier that Cosmo cannot penetrate. He can also direct this energy into powerful attacks, magnified by several large crystals in his battle chamber within Pallasvelda. He is within one of the paths leading to Pallasvelda's internal chambers, battling Koga, Souma, Yuna, and Shun to prevent them from reaching Pallas. Shun discovers that his ability is vulnerable to attacks from normal objects and directs Koga to deliver a blow without his Cloth to destroy the Mystic Stone, ultimately leading to Surtr's defeat and death from Shun's Nebula Storm.
Paradox (パラドクス, Paradokusu)
Voiced by: Yukana
Weapon: Scepter, Scarlet Janus (スカーレットジェイナス, Sukāretto Jeinasu)
Initially introduced as the Gemini Gold Saint. Abandoned by her parents at an early age, Paradox's life was saved in the past by Dragon Shiryu, which led her to become a Saint. Similarly as her predecessor, Gemini Saga, she is afflicted by split personality, one of which manifests as a gentle, refined and loving young woman, who calls herself the Loving Paradox (愛のパラドクス, Ai no Paradokusu), and the other manifests as a wrathful embodiment of hate, calling herself the Hateful Paradox (憎しみのパラドクス, Nikushimi no Paradokusu). She is challenged by Dragon Ryuhou, to which she replies peacefully, but after Ryuhou's refusal to accept Paradox's amoral perspective on her allegiance to Mars, both engage each other in battle with Ryuhou emerging victorious after awakening his Seventh Sense. Paradox survives the battle and is imprisoned until she is rescued by the Primary Pallasite Gallia and returns to confront Ryuhou as a Secondary Pallasite, armed with a staff known as the Scarlet Janus. She is forced to flee after facing defeat from her sister Integra, who has taken up the Gemini Gold cloth, with Ryuhou's help. Paradox later returns attempting to kill Athena, just to be stopped by Integra who has a final confrontation. Once Paradox is defeated, she is forgiven by Athena but is mortally wounded by Gallia. However, before dying, Paradox join forces with her sister to break Europa's Infinite Corridor and have the Saints reunite.

=== Tertiary Pallasites ===
Tarvos (タルヴォス, Taruvosu)
Voiced by: Sōta Arai
Weapon: Morning Star, Star Crusher (スタークラッシャー, Sutā Kurasshā)
Tarvos is a Tertiary Pallasite and the first that Koga faces in battle. Tarvos is an imposing figure who wields a morning star known as the Star Crusher, after being defeated by Koga twice, Tarvos returns donning a powered up version of his Chronotector and is finally killed in a combined effort of Koga and Ryuhou.
Loge (ロゲ, Roge)
Voiced by: Junichi Miyake
Weapon: Spear, Brionac (ブリューナク, Buryūnaku)
Loge is a Tertiary Pallasite and uses a poison-tipped spear called Brionac in battle. He is the second Pallasite to make an appearance as he assaults the newly built Pallaestra in order to kill the Saints who reside there. While Koga and Subaru takes care of his bees, Souma tries desperately to fight the Tertiary Pallasite, but is no match because of his damaged Cloth. However, Koga returns and after being hit with the Ryu Sei Ken, Loge flees. He returns during the assault on Pallas' castle and fight Souma with his new Cloth. However, Souma is injured and the surviving Steel Saints retreat with him. When he finds them, the Steel Saints fight and wound him, before Souma finally kills him with the Lionet Bomber.
Ymir (ユミル, Yumiru) and Methone (メトネ, Metone)
Voiced by: Rie Tozuka and Voiced by: Kouta Nemoto
Weapon: Bagh Nakh, Max Brilliants (マックスブリリアント, Makkusu Buririanto)
Ymir and Methone are Tertiary Pallasites armed with steel claws (bagh nakh) known as the Max Brilliants. Together they make a deadly combination in battle, and they face off against Yuna who has returned from the land of Jamil. However, when facing Yuna and Souma, Methone kills and absorbs his sister's Cosmos to become stronger, something her spirit does not forgive and she kills Methone after Yuna and Souma defeat him.
Hati (ハティ)
Voiced by: Hiroshi Okamoto
Weapon: Dagger Knives, Bloody Daggers (ブラッディダガー, Buraddi Dagā)
Hati is a Tertiary Pallasite who is armed with many dagger knives and has hearing so precise that he can hear his target's heartbeat from a long distance away, crawling on hands and feet to dash at his opponents if necessary. He fights Athena's Saints in order to achieve a promotion to the Secondary Pallasite distinction. He is defeated and killed by Equuleus Celeris using the Supernova Explosion Maximum.
Halimede (ハリメデ, Harimede)
Voiced by: Hiromu Miyazawa
Weapon: Sanjiegun, Phantom Eater (ファントム・イーター, Fantomu Ītā)
Halimede is a Tertiary Pallasite armed with a three-section staff (sanjiegun), sent to find the Bronze Saint who defeated Abzu. He believes in exploiting the weaknesses in others in battle and using tactics over brute force to win. Both Ryuho and Shun defeat him on different occasions, evolving their Clothstones into upgraded cloths in the process. During the assault on Pallas' castle, Halimede has gotten a new upgrade for his three-section staff Phantom Eater (formerly known as Triple Rod (トリプルロッド, Toripuru Roddo)), but is defeated and killed by Subaru after a hard battle.
Thebe (テーベ, Tēbe)
Voiced by: Yūsuke Numata
Weapon: Hammer, Demon Impact (デーモンインパクト, Dēmon Inpakuto)
Thebe is a Tertiary Pallasite armed with a giant hammer called the Demon Impact, with which he can summon a meteor. He is prejudiced against Eden for his defection to the Pallasites, even threatening to kill both Koga and Eden with a meteor unless Eden bows before him. Later, during the assault on Pallas' castle, Thebe decides that he will kill the Saints instead of Hati, with Titan saying both would go. Thebe attacked the Saints from above, where the Pallasite soldiers faced Koga, Ryuho and Haruto, himself fighting Eden again. After a long battle, he decides to use his most powerful attack Gigantic Asteroid to kill everyone, but Eden destroys the attack with his Orions Extermination, and finally kills Thebe as a huge ball of fire smashes down on him.
Cyllene (キュレーネ, Kyurēne)
Voiced by: Atsushi Kisaichi
Weapon: Scythe, Soul Killer (ソウルキラー, Sōru Kirā)
Cyllene is a Tertiary Pallastie armed with a death scythe called Soul Killer. Alongside his twin brother Greip, he impedes the journey of Koga and his companions to Pallasvelda, which he plans to do by cutting down the suspension bridge leading to their stronghold and then facing off against just Koga in battle. He and Greip are defeated and killed by Subaru's new Equuleus Cloth and technique Supernova Explosion.
Greip (グレイプ, Gureipu)
Voiced by: Daisuke Matsubara
Weapon: Scythe, Soul Killer (ソウルキラー, Sōru Kirā)
Greip is a Tertiary Pallastie armed with a death scythe called Soul Killer. Unlike his twin brother Cyllene, he is much more rough in his manner and has initiated a game with his brother to see which of them can be promoted to Secondary Pallasite first. He and Cyllene are defeated and killed by Subaru's new Equuleus Cloth and technique Supernova Explosion.

=== Special Pallasites ===
Mira (ミラー, Mirā)
Voiced by: Yūji Ueda
Weapon: Gauntlet, Alchemy Glove (アルケミーグローブ, Arukemī Gurōbu)
Although he is treated by his peers as a Secondary Pallasite, Mira is a Pallasite who does not feel he fits in the ranking systems of the others and in fact does not fight for Pallas at all but rather for his own enjoyment, and particularly enjoys destroying the Saints' Cloths. He does not wear his full Chronotector in battle, apparently not needing it, but retains his Alchemy Glove which enables him to destroy Cloths. He later appears before Koga and his friends donning his Cronotector and holding several Cloth Stones from the saints he killed. He tries to add their cloths to his collection but is stopped by Phoenix Ikki who retrieves the Cloth Stones and entrusts them to Koga. He then tries to kill Ikki with no success until he is called back by Europa, later reappearing to fight Hyoga and Shun. When Saturn awakens, Mira reveals himself as a Primary Pallasite just like Europa and rejoins his master with him. Mira is ultimately killed by Hyoga after the Cygnus Saint takes a blow from the Pallasite just to freeze him in place with the Absolute Zero Cold Air.
Europa (エウロパ)
Voiced by: Issei Futamata
Weapon: Chakram, Slash Reaper (スラッシュリーパー, Surasshu Rīpā)
Europa is a Secondary Pallasite armed with a chakram called the Slash Reaper and can somehow levitate. He seems to be very aloof, rather watching others fight than participate himself, and he even apologizes to Koga and Subaru after engaging them in battle. He faces Eden in battle later, and retreats after the Orion Saint manages to wound him before he could kill Subaru. After Aegaeon dies in battle against Phoenix Ikki, Europa reclaims the hilt of his destroyed sword, for a yet unrevealed purpose. Europa is eventually revealed to be a fifth Primary Pallasite who has been conspiring in the shadows for the advent of the Pallasites' true master: Saturn. While facing off against Shun, Europa barely survives the Andromeda Saint's Nebula Storm, just to be later killed by Titan.

== See also ==
- Saint Seiya
- List of Saint Seiya characters
