= List of Simoun characters =

This is a list of character in the anime series Simoun.

== Protagonists ==
Aer (アーエル, Āeru)
Voiced by: Michi Nīno
Aer is a brash young sibylla who joins Chor Tempest as one of three replacements for combat losses in the first battle against Argentum. She immediately takes a liking to Neviril, and pushes to become Neviril's new pair after Amuria is lost. Aer fits the stereotype of the fighter pilot, and has little patience for the sibyllae's role as priestesses. She possesses an outstanding flying ability. Normally, she flies auriga, whether it's with Neviril or other sybillae. Her name means "divine love" in the language of the neighboring mountain nation of Plumbum. She loves Neviril a lot, but she is frustrated when Neviril is thinking of Amuria. In the end of the series, she and Neviril are in the new world, happily dancing. She and Neviril piloted the Ventus (ウェヌストゥス / ウェントス) Simoun.
Neviril (ネヴィリル, Neviriru)
Voiced by: Rieko Takahashi
Neviril is the Sibylla Aurea, and the regina of Chor Tempest. She has a reputation for being the best Auriga in the entire Simoun fleet, and is the object of admiration of both the other sibyllae and the cadets aboard Arcus Prima. She is so revered that junior sibyllae are reprimanded for addressing her without an honorific even in her absence. She is the daughter of Halconf, the chief administrator of Simulacrum's government. She and Amuria were very close, and she is devastated by the loss of her beloved partner. Despite the fact she keeps being reminded of Amuria, she falls in love with Aer and march to the new world together. She and Aer piloted the Ventus (ウェヌストゥス / ウェントス) Simoun.
Paraietta (パライエッタ)
Voiced by: Ami Koshimizu
Paraietta is second-in-command of Chor Tempest, and a respected Sibylla. She flies as an auriga, paired with Kaim. She has a stern, masculine manner, and joined Chor Tempest because she is Neviril's childhood friend. Ironically, she chooses her sex as a female, and, in the end, she works in a kindergarten with Roatreamon. She has a huge, but unrequited, crush on Neviril; and she is very loyal to her. She and Kaim piloted the Typhon or Scutum (デュポーン/スクートゥム).
Kaim (カイム, Kaimu)
Voiced by: Michiko Hosokoshi
Kaim is a diffident sibylla with large round glasses, who flies sagitta aboard Paraietta's Simoun. She is Alty's older sister, though she harbors a great hostility towards Alty as a result of their having had sexual relations in the past; but in the end, she reconciles with her sister. Although she can be very nice, she is also alert and easily roused. She harbors an unrequited love for Paraietta. She and Paraietta piloted the Typhon or Scutum (デュポーン/スクートゥム).
Alty (アルティ, Aruti)
Voiced by: Megumi Toyoguchi
Alty is Floe's pair, and wears her hair in a chin-length bob parted in the middle. She harbors an incestuous crush toward her older sister, Kaim, which causes her sister's hostility to her. She flies auriga, paired with Floe. She and Floe piloted Turbo or Cometes (チューボ/コメーテース).
Floe (フロエ/フロフ, Furoe)
Voiced by: Michiru Aizawa
Floe is an energetic orange-haired sibylla. She flies sagitta with Alty. She is very forward with her feelings, and is not shy about expressing them, much to the chagrin of the stricter sybillae, such as Paraietta. In the end, she chooses to be male, and changes her name to "Floef." She and Alty piloted Turbo or Cometes (チューボ/コメーテース).
Roatreamon (ロードレアモン, Rōdoreamon)
Voiced by: Mikako Takahashi
Roatreamon is a gentle, feminine Sibylla from an important family. Everyone addresses her as ojō-sama, be it for respect or in a joking manner, but treats her with a degree of deference and softness. She flies with Elly until Elly leaves to go to the Spring, and has a deep knowledge of sibylla traditions. As children, she and Mamina met, but were divided by the class difference between them. She tried to be Mamina's friend, which was achieved in the middle of the series, and Mamina's death affects her the most. In the end, she works with Paraietta in a kindergarten that her parents built. She and Morinas piloted the Vertex or Auxilium (ウェルテクス/アウクシリウム).
Morinas (モリナス, Morinasu)
Voiced by: Nana Mizuki
Morinas is another of the replacement Sibylla who joins Chor Tempest after the first battle of the war. She pursues Neviril for a time when she first joins the chor, but eventually gives up. She has a keen interest in understanding how the helical motors that power the Simoun work, and is a compulsive flirt. She and Wapōrif develop a romantic attraction. At the end of the series, she and Waporif had a child. She is pregnant with their second child. She and Roatreamon piloted the Vertex or Auxilium (ウェルテクス/アウクシリウム).
Limone (リモネ)
Voiced by: Mamiko Noto
Limone is an extremely young sibylla assigned to Chor Tempest as a replacement for the losses from the first battle. She was promoted to the rank of sibylla at an unusually early age due to her flying ability and sharp intellect. She is very fond of sweets, and can frequently be seen snacking on some treat or other. While truly a genius sybilla, due to her young age, Limone lacks combat experience and, plagued by an incident occurred due to her past confidence, is initially prone to frighten out. This changes after she is encouraged by Aer and then paired with Dominüra, whom she considers as a mother. In the end, she is in the past with Dominüra. She and Dominüra piloted the Procella or Vinculum (プロケラ/ウィンクルム).
Dominüra (ドミヌーラ, Dominūra)
Voiced by: Yukana
Dominüra is the eldest of all sibylla. She is connected to ruling circles in Simulacrum, and was the only remaining survivor (Aer's grandfather passing away making her the last survivor) of the destruction of Chor Dextra after that chor attempted to perform the Emerald Ri Maajon. She joins Chor Tempest at Guragief's request. She flies as a sagitta, paired with Limone. She has mysterious political connections to a faction within the Simulacran administration. While initially rejected by her pair, she eventually forms a deep bond of affection with Limone. Near the end she discovers than she is, unwittingly, the reason of the war for telling the secret of the Emerald Ri Maajon. In the final episode, she offers Limone to fly on another sky. She and Limone piloted the Procella or Vinculum (プロケラ/ウィンクルム).
Mamina (マミーナ, Mamīna)
Voiced by: Rika Morinaga
Mamina is a skillful but haughty sibylla, formerly assigned to Chor Ignis aboard the Arcus Niger who joins Chor Tempest at Halconf's request. Her parents were servants to Roatreamon's family, and that's the reason she initially rejects to be Roatreamon's friend. She and Aer fight because they both want to be Neviril's pair. Despite her humble origins, she was promoted to Sibylla rank when she volunteered for combat duty when other sibyllae refused. Her hobby is cooking, and she also enjoys cleaning and other domestic chores. Very slowly, she befriended Roatreamon and even loves her. In episode 19, She cuts one of her hair off and the High Priestesses of Plumbum girls killed her offscreen while protecting Neviril from the Argentum. She and Yun piloted the Nimbus or Superbus (ニンバス/スペルブス).
Yun (ユン)
Voiced by: Kaori Nazuka
Mamina's sagitta before the two join Chor Tempest. She speaks very bluntly, refers to herself using masculine pronouns, and hates war. She is devoutly religious, sincerely committed to the cause of peace, and loves to read. She holds herself aloof from the rest of Chor Tempest, and is often quiet and no-nonsense with the other sybillae. She witnessed many of her comrades slaughtered in the war, leaving Yun traumatized. In the end, she becomes the new High Priestess after Onasia's disappearance. She and Mamina piloted the Nimbus or Superbus (ニンバス/スペルブス).

== Supporting characters ==
Amuria (アムリア)
Voiced by: Eri Kitamura
Amuria was Neviril's sagitta until the first battle against Argentum. She was a very determined sibylla, keenly interested in the Simoun as instruments of power. She and Neviril had been a pair, and romantically partnered, ever since Neviril first joined Chor Tempest. Amuria was lost when she and Neviril attempted the Emerald Ri Mājon (an extremely difficult and powerful Ri Mājon maneuver, which was Amuria's idea to try) in the first combat action against Argentum.
Anubituf (アヌビトゥフ, Anubitufu)
Voiced by: Reiko Kiuchi
Anubituf is the captain of the Arcus Prima. He is a responsible, determined warrior and a wise commander. He and Guragief were sibyllae together before they went to the Spring, and the two have remained close ever since.
Guragief (グラギエフ, Guragiefu)
Voiced by: Hōko Kuwashima
Guragief is the overall commander (or "Dux") of the Simoun forces aboard Arcus Prima, which consist of Chor Tempest, Chor Rubor, and Chor Caput. He is responsible for personnel decisions, and dispatches the Simoun fleet on their missions. He is very empathetic, and cares deeply about the sibyllae in his care.
Wapōrif (ワポーリフ, Wapōrifu)
Voiced by: Fumie Mizusawa
Wapōrif is a maintenance technician for the Simoun aboard the Arcus Prima. He went to the Spring under the temple of Tempus Spatium two years before the beginning of the series, and chose to become male. He had a crush on Floe, but did not become close because she was a Sibylla. Once he got over her, Floe told him to say they were lovers. Wapōrif is devoutly religious, and develops a close relationship with Morinas. Due to the gender change taking a certain amount of time to complete he initially appears female.
Vura/Vuraf (ヴューラ/ヴュラフ, Vyūra/Vyurafu)
Voiced by: Ai Hayasaka
Vura is the regina of Chor Rubor, and is assigned to be Aer's roommate aboard Arcus Prima. She develops a rivalry with Chor Tempest at first, but grows to respect them. She's the substitute of Mamina after her death. In the end, she becomes male and changes his name to "Vuraf."
Wauf (ワウフ, Wauf)
Voiced by: Urara Takano
Wauf is the captain of the old-timer patrol-ship Messis. He went to the Spring under the temple of Tempus Spatium long ago, and looks like a middle-age man. He has brilliant skill and knowledge of tactics, and cares for his new passengers, the Simoun sybillae of Chor Tempest. He believes that, in spite of their apparent deaths while performing the Emerald Ri Mājon, that Dominüra and Rimone are still alive.
Onasia (オナシア, Onashia)
Voiced by: Sakiko Tamagawa
Onasia is the High Priestess of the Tempus Spatium, and presides over the gender selection ceremony at the Spring. As head of Simulacrum's High Council, she serves as head of state and has lived for many generations. In the end, she disappears in Yun's arms.
Halconf (ハルコンフ, Harukonfu)
Voiced by: Yōko Sōmi
Halconf is the father of Neviril and the vice-chair of Simulacrum's high council, second only to Onasia. He is a former sibylla, and takes a keen interest in Chor Tempest and in Neviril's career.
Elly/Elif (エリー/エリフ, Erī/Erīfu)
Voiced by: Yukana
Elly turns seventeen shortly after the start of the series, and goes to the Spring under the temple of Tempus Spatium. Because she has not made up her mind as to which sex she prefers to be, she is assigned to be male. She then changes his name to "Elif", as the terminal -f sound signifies masculinity in the Simulacran culture.
Anglas (アングラス, Angurasu)
Voiced by: Miyu Matsuki
Anglas is a priestess of the deity "Animus" from the neighbouring country of Plumbum. When Plumbum and Simulacrum hold a peace conference, she is seconded to Chor Tempest for a time on the theory that Animus and the Tempus Spatium are the same deity.
