= Night Head 2041 =

Japanese anime television series

- Anime key visual
- Genre: Science fiction; Supernatural; Suspense
- Manga
- Illustrated by: Akira Ogawa
- Published by: Kodansha
- Magazine: YanMaga Web
- Original run: April 28, 2021 – August 24, 2022
- Volumes: 4
- Anime television series
- Directed by: Takamitsu Hirakawa
- Produced by: Akitoshi Mori; Toshiaki Obata; Kazuya Ide
- Written by: George Iida
- Music by: Yutaka Yamada
- Studio: Shirogumi
- Licensed by: Crunchyroll
- Original network: Fuji TV (+Ultra)
- Original run: July 15, 2021 – September 30, 2021
- Episodes: 12
- Novel series
- Written by: George Iida; Kawato Azusa (collaboration)
- Published by: Kodansha
- Imprint: Kodansha Taiga
- Original run: August 21, 2021 – September 15, 2021
- Volumes: 2

Night Head 2041 (stylized as NIGHT HEAD 2041) is a Japanese anime television series based on the 1992 Japanese television drama series Night Head. The series is animated by Shirogumi, directed by Takamitsu Hirakawa and written by George Iida, the director of the original drama. Original character designs are provided by Oh! great, while Kenichiro Tomiyasu is drawing the concept art. Yutaka Yamada is composing the series' music, and Slow Curve is credited for planning and production. It aired on Fuji TV's +Ultra programming block from July to September 2021. Who-ya Extended performed the series' opening theme song "Icy Ivy", while Myuk performed the series' ending theme song "Shion". Crunchyroll licensed the series.

A manga adaptation with art by Akira Ogawa has been serialized online via Kodansha's YanMaga Web website since April 28, 2021, and has been collected in two tankōbon volumes. A novel adaptation written by George Iida in collaboration with Kawato Azusa was released in two volumes between August and September 2021. A stage play adaptation has also been announced.

== Characters ==
Naoto Kirihara (霧原直人, Kirihara Naoto)
Voiced by: Daisuke Ono, Hiroki Nanami (young)
Naoya Kirihara (霧原直也, Kirihara Naoya)
Voiced by: Nobunaga Shimazaki, Shizuka Ishigami (young)
Takuya Kuroki (黒木タクヤ, Kuroki Takuya)
Voiced by: Takahiro Sakurai, Natsumi Fujiwara (young)
Yūya Kuroki (黒木ユウヤ, Kuroki Yūya)
Voiced by: Kensho Ono, Makoto Koichi (young)
Michio Sonezaki (曽根崎道夫, Sonezaki Michio)
Voiced by: Kazuyuki Okitsu
Reika Mutō (武藤玲佳, Mutō Reika)
Voiced by: Lynn
Daisuke Honda (本田大輔, Honda Daisuke)
Voiced by: Yasuhiro Mamiya
Kimie Kobayashi (小林君枝, Kobayashi Kimie)
Voiced by: Yoko Hikasa
Yui Akiyama (秋山唯, Aikyama Yui)
Voiced by: Reina Ueda
Shoko Futami (双海翔子, Futami Shōko)
Voiced by: Kaori Maeda
Kyōjirō Mikuriya (御厨恭二朗, Mikuriya Kyōjirō)
Voiced by: Banjō Ginga
Suguru Kakitani (柿谷スグル, Kaiktani Suguru)
Voiced by: Tomoaki Maeno
Miki Tachibana (立花美紀, Tachibana Miki)
Voiced by: Aya Endō
Mikie Fujiki (藤木マイク, Fujiki Mikie)
Voiced by: Chikahiro Kobayashi
Kōji Kazama (風間浩二, Kazama Kōji)
Voiced by: Tomokazu Sugita
Emily Shinjō (新城エミリ, Shinjō Emiri)
Voiced by: Saori Hayami
Losyukov (ロシュコフ, Roshukofu)
Voiced by: Kōsei Hirota
Victor (ヴィクトル, Vikutoru)
Voiced by: Tarusuke Shingaki
Akiko Okuhara (奥原晶子, Okuhara Akiko)
Voiced by: Mari Yokoo
Elder Misaki (ミサキ老人, Misaki Rōjin)
Voiced by: Motomu Kiyokawa

== Episode list ==
No.	Title	Directed by	Written by	Storyboarded by	Original release date
1	"Barrier -Onset-"; Transliteration: "Kekkai -Onsetto-" (Japanese: 結界 -Onset-)	Kazufumi Tenjō	George Iida	Yōhei Arai	July 15, 2021 (Note: This episode aired at 1:05 a.m. JST, 10 minutes after the original air time on Fuji TV.)
2	"Fake -Deception-"; Transliteration: "Nisemono -Desepushon-" (Japanese: 偽物 -Deception-)	Sō Yamamura	George Iida	Taku Yonebayashi, Yōhei Arai	July 22, 2021 (Note: This episode aired at 1:00 a.m. JST, 5 minutes after the original air time on Fuji TV.)
3	"Complication, Trigger -Awakening-"; Transliteration: "Sakusō, Keiki -Aweikuningu-" (Japanese: 錯綜、契機 -Awakening-)	Kazufumi Tenjō	George Iida	Tsukasa Sunaga, Kazufumi Tenjō	July 29, 2021 (Note: This episode aired at 1:35 a.m. JST, 40 minutes after the original air time on Fuji TV.)
4	"Inspiration -Resonance-"; Transliteration: "Shokuhatsu -Rezonansu-" (Japanese: 触発 -Resonance-)	Sō Yamamura	George Iida	Yōhei Arai	August 5, 2021
5	"Shoko Futami -Shoko-"; Transliteration: "Futami Shōko -Shōko-" (Japanese: 双海翔子 -Shoko-)	Kazufumi Tenjō, Yōhei Arai	George Iida	Tsukasa Sunaga, Tetsuya Ishii	August 12, 2021
6	"Ideologies Collide -Showdown-"; Transliteration: "Shisō, Taiji -Shōdaun-" (Japanese: 思想、対峙 -Showdown-)	Sō Yamamura, Yōhei Arai	George Iida	Yōhei Arai	August 19, 2021
7	"Between the Worlds"; Transliteration: "Sekai no Hazama -Bituīn za Wāruzu-" (Japanese: 世界の狭間 -Between the Worlds-)	Daisuke Shioya	George Iida	Tsukasa Sunaga, Jun'ichi Umezawa	August 26, 2021 (Note: This episode aired at 1:10 a.m. JST, 15 minutes after the original air time on Fuji TV.)
8	"Revelation of Destruction -March to Decimation-"; Transliteration: "Hametsu e no Keiji -Māchi tu Deshimēshon-" (Japanese: 破滅への啓示 -March to Decimation-)	Sō Yamamura	George Iida	Yōhei Arai	September 2, 2021
9	"Paradox"; Transliteration: "Gyakuri -Paradokkusu-" (Japanese: 逆理 -Paradox-)	Kazufumi Tenjō	George Iida	Tsukasa Sunaga, Tetsuya Ishii, Kazufumi Tenjō, Jun'ichi Umezawa	September 9, 2021
10	"Protection and Salvation -Our Destiny-"; Transliteration: "Shugo to Kyūsai -Awā Disutenī-" (Japanese: 守護と救済 -Our Destiny-)	Sō Yamamura	George Iida	Yōhei Arai	September 16, 2021
11	"Dimensional Fusion -Unity-"; Transliteration: "Jikū Yūgō -Yunitī-" (Japanese: 時空融合 -Unity-)	Kazufumi Tenjō	George Iida	Yōhei Arai	September 23, 2021
12	"Inheritance and Reincarnation -Start Over-"; Transliteration: "Keishō, Kaiten -Sutāto Ōbā-" (Japanese: 継承、廻転 -Start Over-)	Sō Yamamura	George Iida	Tsukasa Sunaga, Yōhei Arai	September 30, 2021 (Note: This episode aired at 12:35 a.m. JST, 20 minutes before the original air time on Fuji TV.)
