= Asami Tojo =

Japanese manga artist (1972–2007)

- 東城麻美
- Born: August 19, 1972
- Died: October 12, 2007 (aged 35)
- Occupation: Manga artist
- Years active: 1994–2007
- Website: tojo-asami.com

Asami Tojo (東城 麻美, Tōjō Asami; August 19, 1972 — October 12, 2007), whose name was also written as Asami Tohjoh, was a Japanese manga artist.

== Works ==
=== Series ===
Year	Title	Magazine	Notes
1993–1994	Chimera; Kimeira (キメイラ)		
1995	Sci-Fi Harry		As artist
1998–2000	X-Kai	Eyes Comics	
2000–2002	Denkō Sekka Boys (電光石火BOYS)	Hanaoto	
2004–2005	Thunderbolt Excite Boys; Chōhatsu: Denkō Sekka Boys (挑発～電光石火BOYS～)	Chara Selection	
2005	Only You	Reijin	
2005	Love Prism; Rabu Purizumu (ラブプリズム)	Magazine Magazine Junet	
