= Sci-Fi Harry =

Japanese manga series

- Sci-Fi HARRY
- Manga cover (vol. 1)

サイファイハリー (Saifai Harī)
- Manga
- Written by: George Iida
- Illustrated by: Asami Tojo
- Published by: Takeshobo
- Original run: July 1995 – November 1995
- Volumes: 2
- Anime television series
- Directed by: Katsuyuki Kodera
- Produced by: Kenji Kinoshita; Shun Arikawa; Kazufumi Nomura
- Written by: Kenichi Takashima
- Music by: Yoshihiro Ike
- Studio: A.P.P.P.
- Original network: TV Asahi, Nagoya TV
- Original run: October 5, 2000 – March 23, 2001
- Episodes: 20
- Manga
- Written by: George Iida
- Illustrated by: Asami Tojo
- Published by: Kadokawa
- Imprint: Dragon Comics
- Original run: 2000 – 2008
- Volumes: 2

Sci-Fi HARRY (サイファイハリー, Sai fai harī) is a 1995 Japanese manga series written by George Iida and illustrated by Asami Tohjoh which was adapted into an anime series broadcast in Japan in 2000. It was a joint production of TV Asahi Corporation and Nagoya Broadcasting Network. The series was produced for nighttime broadcast slot.

== Plot ==
Harry McQuinn is a school loser until he discovers that he has psychic powers. Whenever Harry uses powers, someone in the area near him is killed.

== Episodes ==
1. "Jellyfish"
2. "Omen"
3. "Force"
4. "Isolation"
5. "Escape"
6. "Contact"
7. "Affinity"
8. "Heat"
9. "Recover"
10. "Day Dream"
11. "Assassin"
12. "Vortex"
13. "Inquisition"
14. "Greed"
15. "Trap"
16. "Suspicion"
17. "Decoy"
18. "Experiment"
19. "Chaos"
20. "Cosmos"

=== Theme songs ===
- Opening: "Mysterious" by Janne Da Arc
- Ending: "Ai wo Shiru ni wa Hayasugita no ka" by LUCA
