= Code Geass Lelouch of the Rebellion =

Three-part film by Gorō Taniguchi

- Theatrical release poster for Initiation
- Japanese: コードギアス 反逆のルルーシュ
- Revised Hepburn: Kōdo Giasu Hangyaku no Rurūshu
- Directed by: Gorō Taniguchi
- Screenplay by: Ichirō Ōkouchi
- Based on: Code Geass by Gorō Taniguchi and Ichirō Ōkouchi
- Starring: see below
- Cinematography: Hiroyuki Chiba; Sōta Ōya (Initiation)
- Edited by: Seiji Morita
- Music by: Kōtarō Nakagawa; Hitomi Kuroishi
- Production company: Sunrise
- Distributed by: Showgate
- Release dates: October 21, 2017 (Initiation); February 10, 2018 (Transgression); May 26, 2018 (Glorification)
- Running time: 135 minutes (Initiation); 133 minutes (Transgression); 140 minutes (Glorification)
- Country: Japan
- Language: Japanese

Code Geass Lelouch of the Rebellion (Japanese: コードギアス 反逆のルルーシュ, Hepburn: Kōdo Giasu Hangyaku no Rurūshu) is a Japanese three-part animated science fantasy action film directed by Gorō Taniguchi and written by Ichirō Ōkouchi based on their anime television series with the same name. Produced by Sunrise and distributed by Showgate, the three-part film is a compilation of the television series. The voice cast from the television series reprised their roles for the three-part film. The first film, Initiation, (Note: コードギアス 反逆のルルーシュ I 興道, Kōdo Giasu – Hangyaku no Rurūshu Ichi – Kōdō; lit. "Code Geass Lelouch of the Rebellion Episode I: The Awakening Path") was released on October 21, 2017. The second film, Transgression, (Note: コードギアス 反逆のルルーシュ II 叛道, Kōdo Giasu – Hangyaku no Rurūshu Ni – Handō; lit. "Code Geass Lelouch of the Rebellion Episode II: The Rebellion Path") was released on February 10, 2018. The third film, Glorification, (Note: コードギアス 反逆のルルーシュ III 皇道, Kōdo Giasu – Hangyaku no Rurūshu Sān – Ōdō; lit. "Code Geass Lelouch of the Rebellion Episode III: The Imperial Path") was released on May 26, 2018.

A sequel film, Code Geass Lelouch of the Re;surrection, was released in 2019, followed by a sequel four-part film, Code Geass: Rozé of the Recapture released in 2024.

== Plot ==
The three-part film largely covers the events of the main anime series. Initiation compiles Season 1, Episodes 1–17; Transgression covers Season 1, Episodes 18–25 and Season 2, Episodes 1-16; and Glorification covers Season 2, Episodes 17–25.

Aside from a few bonus scenes and cut plot points, the most significant change is the fate of Shirley Fenette. Shirley's father is never killed during the Battle of Narita, thus avoiding the chain of events that ultimately results in her own death. Instead, Shirley survives through the rest of the story. This change has no particular influence on the rest of the plot.

In a post-credits scene at the end of Glorification, C.C. is shown riding on horseback towards a ceremony at Jeremiah Gottwald's orange farm that he and Shirley are hosting. The tracks from the hay cart she rode on at the end of the original series are shown on the road she is traveling on.

== Voice cast ==
| Character | Japanese voice cast |
|---|---|
| Lelouch Lamperouge | Jun Fukuyama; Sayaka Ohara (young) |
| Suzaku Kururugi | Takahiro Sakurai; Akeno Watanabe (young) |
| C.C | Yukana |
| Kallen Kouzuki | Ami Koshimizu |
| Nunnally vi Britannia | Kaori Nazuka |
| Charles vi Britannia | Norio Wakamoto |
| V.V. | Eisuke Kawashiro |
| Cornelia li Britannia | Junko Minagawa |
| Euphemia li Britannia | Omi Minami |
| Rolo Lamperouge | Takahiro Mizushima |
| Shirley Fenette | Fumiko Orikasa |
| Milly Ashford | Sayaka Ohara |
| Rivalz Cardemonde | Noriaki Sugiyama |

== Production ==
In June 2017, it was announced that a three-part compilation film of Code Geass was in the works, with series director Gorō Taniguchi and writer Ichirō Ōkouchi returning for the films. Taniguchi confirmed that while the films are recap of the television series, there are few changes to the storylines. Many of the key staff members from the television series were credited for their respective roles; manga artist group CLAMP for their character design concept, with Takahiro Kimura as an animation character designer, and Kōtarō Nakagawa and Hitomi Kuroishi for their musical scores.

The voice cast from the television series reprised their respective roles to re-record their old dialogues and new ones for the new scenes.

The opening songs from the television series were used in the compilation films' openings. The new ending songs were announced: "Only Red is Missing" (赤だけが足りない, Aka dake ga tarinai), sung by Iris was used in Initiation, "The Moon", sung by Sakura Fujiwara, was used in Transgression, and "NE:ONE", sung by Survive Said the Prophet, was used in Glorification.

== Release ==
The three-part film was released in Japanese theaters; Initiation was released on October 21, 2017, Transgression was released on February 10, 2018, and Glorification on May 26, 2018.

== Reception ==
=== Box office ===
Transgression debuted at number eight in the Japanese box office.

=== Critical reception ===
James Beckett of Anime News Network gave the three-part film "C+" rating, and states "If you like your robot wars filled with magic, melodrama, and more beautiful CLAMP boys than you can shake a stick at, then the original Code Geass will likely be worth your time." Comic Book Resources published an article listing places where—in writer Liz Adler's opinion—the films improved upon the anime, and where the original anime was better. Panos Kotzathanasis of Asian Movie Pulse gave a mostly positive review of Initiation. Sarah Rawlings of Anime UK News rated Initiation 7/10.

== Sequels ==
The sequel was teased when the three-part film was first announced. In August 2018, it was revealed that the sequel is going to be an anime film, and returning key staff and cast members from the anime television series and the three-part film were announced for the film. The sequel film, titled Code Geass Lelouch of the Re;surrection (コードギアス 復活のルルーシュ, Kōdo Giasu Fukkatsu no Rurūshu) was released in Japanese theaters on February 9, 2019. It was followed by a sequel four-part film, Code Geass: Rozé of the Recapture (コードギアス 奪還のロゼ, Kōdo Giasu: Dakkan no Roze), released in 2024.
