= List of Code Geass season 1 episodes =

Code Geass: Lelouch of the Rebellion
- Season 1
- The cover of Code Geass: Lelouch of the Rebellion Part 3 released by Bandai Entertainment
- No. of episodes: 25

Release
- Original network: JNN (MBS)
- Original release: October 6, 2006 – July 29, 2007

Season chronology
- Next → Season 2: Lelouch of the Rebellion R2

The first season of the Code Geass anime series, titled Code Geass: Lelouch of the Rebellion (Japanese: コードギアス 反逆のルルーシュ, Hepburn: Kōdo Giasu: Hangyaku no Rurūshu), is produced by Sunrise, Mainichi Broadcasting System, and Project Geass. The series was directed by Gorō Taniguchi who cooperated with Ichirō Ōkouchi on the script. The characters were conceived by Clamp and designed by Takahiro Kimura. The plot follows Lelouch vi Britannia who leads a rebellion group called the Black Knights to oppose the superpower, Britannia.

The production of Code Geass: Lelouch of the Rebellion was revealed by an internet trailer in 2006. It premiered on MBS TV on October 6, 2006, and was broadcast by a total of ten stations. The final two episodes were aired on July 29, 2007, and received an early screening in Tokyo and Osaka theaters a week earlier. Bandai Visual encapsulated the episodes into nine volumes in DVD, Blu-ray, and Universal Media Disc formats. Each volume contained a picture drama episode as a bonus. The nine volumes were re-released into two DVD volumes, then re-released as a single adaptation called Special Edition Black Rebellion, and then re-released in a box collection; the latter two were released in both DVD and Blu-ray format.

During the 2007 Otakon, Bandai Entertainment announced its acquisition of Code Geass: Lelouch of the Rebellion for a North American release. The dubbing was produced by ZRO Limit Productions with Taniguchi advising on what characteristics the character's voice should portray. Bandai Entertainment released the series as individual volumes and parts. Four volumes were released containing the first seventeen episodes and three parts contained the whole series. A box collection was released on March 22, 2011. The English dub aired on Adult Swim between April 27, 2008, and October 26, 2008. Bandai Entertainment added the episodes to their YouTube channel beginning on February 1, 2009. The episodes were then made available on Crunchyroll between April 25, 2009, until December 31, 2012. During the 2013 Otakon, Funimation announced its acquisition of the series.

In the United Kingdom, Beez Entertainment and Kazé each released a box collection of the series. Madman Entertainment announced its license of the series in July 2008 for Australasia. It began airing the series on ABC2 and ABC iview beginning January 19 until June 29, 2009. Madman streamed the first two episode on their website in April 2009. The series was then released as a DVD and Blu-ray collection.

The episodes use five pieces of theme music: three opening and two ending themes. For the first 12 episodes, the opening theme is "Colors" performed by Flow while the ending theme is "Yūkyō Seishunka" (勇侠青春謳, lit. "Chivalrous Youth Song") performed by Ali Project. For the rest of the season, the opening theme is "Kaidokufunō" (解読不能, lit. "Indecipherable") performed by Jinn and the ending theme is "Mosaic Kakera" (モザイクカケラ, lit. "Mosaic Fragments") performed by SunSet Swish. Episodes 24 and 25 had the opening theme "Hitomi no Tsubasa" (瞳ノ翼, lit. "Eye's Wing") performed by Access.

For the 15th anniversary rebroadcast edition, the opening theme for the first thirteen episodes is "Dice" by Flow while the ending theme is "Will-ill" by TK from Ling Tosite Sigure. For the rest of the season, the opening theme is "Phoenix Prayer" by Eir Aoi and the ending theme is "Sakura Burst" by Cö Shu Nie.

== Episode list ==
No. overall	No. in season	Title	Storyboarded by	Directed by	Written by	Original release date	English air date	Ref.
1	1	"The Day a New Demon was Born"; Transliteration: "Majin ga Umareta Hi" (Japanese: 魔神が生まれた日)	Gorō Taniguchi	Noriaki Akitaya	Ichirō Ōkouchi	October 6, 2006	April 27, 2008	
A mysterious green haired girl watches two young boys, the Britannian Lelouch and the Japanese Suzaku Kururugi as they learn of Britannia's conquest of Japan, where the former vowed to destroy Britannia. In the present, Lelouch is a student at Ashford Academy. One day on the way to school, he becomes caught up in an anti-government resistance truck as it flees from the Britannian military after stealing a container of poison gas. During the pursuit, Lelouch is reunited with his childhood friend, Suzaku Kururugi, who is now serving in the Britannian army. The container opens and reveals the mysterious green-haired girl, causing Suzaku's superior to order the execution of all witnesses. Suzaku refuses and is shot while Lelouch flees with the girl. Cornered by the military, the girl grants Lelouch a power called Geass and collapses soon after. Using this ability, Lelouch commands his attackers to kill themselves.
2	2	"The White Knight Awakens"; Transliteration: "Kakusei no Shiroki Kishi" (Japanese: 覚醒の白き騎士)	Tsukasa Sunaga	Masato Miyoshi	Ichirō Ōkouchi	October 13, 2006	May 4, 2008	
Lelouch is questioned by Villetta Nu about the dead soldiers. Using his Geass, he orders her to give him her Knightmare Frame, a giant mechanical robot. Lelouch then leads the terrorist group in battle against Viceroy Clovis la Britannia's army, forcing the Britannians to deploy the experimental Knightmare Frame Lancelot piloted by Suzaku. The Lancelot defeats the rebel group, leaving them all at gunpoint, but Clovis suddenly orders a withdrawal. Lelouch infiltrates Clovis's room and holds him at gunpoint, reminding him of the chess games they played as children. He then reveals himself as Lelouch vi Britannia, the long-thought dead prince and Clovis's half-brother.
3	3	"The False Classmate"; Transliteration: "Itsuwari no Kurasumeito" (Japanese: 偽りのクラスメイト)	Kazuya Murata	Kazuya Murata	Ichirō Ōkouchi	October 20, 2006	May 11, 2008	
Having reason to suspect the death of Marianne vi Britannia, his mother, and the blinding of his sister Nunnally Vi Britannia was planned by one of his relatives, Lelouch questions Clovis about her murder before killing him. He returns to Ashford Academy and realizes his classmate, Kallen Stadtfeld, is part of the resistance group. Using Geass, he learns about her motivations for joining the terrorist group and discovers Geass only works once per person. Kallen suspects Lelouch's involvement in the previous battle but is fooled when Lelouch prepares a pre-recorded phone call. Soon after, the news announces Suzaku has been arrested for Clovis' murder and is to be tried.
4	4	"His Name is Zero"; Transliteration: "Sono Na wa Zero" (Japanese: その名はゼロ)	Tsukasa Sunaga	Kazuo Miyake	Ichirō Ōkouchi	October 27, 2006	May 18, 2008	
Jeremiah Gottwald and the pure- blood faction within the Britannian Army wish to scapegoat Suzaku for Clovis' death as an excuse to rid the army of Honorary Britannians, citizens who become Britannians after their country had been conquered. Lloyd Asplund, the creator of the Lancelot, and Cécile Croomy regret this due to his talent. Lelouch dons the pseudonym Zero and with the help of Kallen and Kaname Ohgi, uses Geass on Jeremiah allowing them to escape with Suzaku. As Zero, Lelouch asks Suzaku to join him to rebel against Britannia; Suzaku refuses, believing Britannia should be changed with legal means and departs for his trial. At school, the green-haired girl suddenly appears to Nunnally.
5	5	"The Princess and the Witch"; Transliteration: "Kōjo to Majo" (Japanese: 皇女と魔女)	Tsukasa Sunaga	Akira Toba	Ichirō Ōkouchi	November 3, 2006	May 25, 2008	
Lelouch is reunited with the green haired girl who introduces herself as C.C. and is now living in his residence. Meanwhile, since Zero revealed he was Clovis' murderer, Suzaku has been acquitted of all charges and meets Lelouch's half-sister Princess Euphemia li Britannia. Euphie has Suzaku guide her around Japan including the war-torn city of Shinjuku; there, the two intervene with the pure-blood faction's murder attempt on Jeremiah for his betrayal. Later, Euphie greets her sister Cornelia li Britannia as she arrives in the country, intent on capturing Zero. Suzaku arrives at Lelouch's class, announced as a new student.
6	6	"The Stolen Mask"; Transliteration: "Ubawareta Kamen" (Japanese: 奪われた仮面)	Kazuya Murata	Hiroaki Kudō	Ichirō Ōkouchi	November 10, 2006	June 1, 2008	
Suzaku faces the prejudice of the Britannian students. Arthur, a stray cat, enters Lelouch's room and steals his Zero mask. Milly Ashford, believing Arthur has something that embarrasses Lelouch, has the whole school pursue the cat with a bounty. When Suzaku catches up to the cat on the roof, Lelouch intentionally slips, distracting Suzaku and forcing him to save him. Lelouch secretly retrieves the mask and Suzaku's heroic save allows some of the students to accept him, and he joins the Student Council alongside Lelouch and his friends. The students attend an assembly where Charles zi Britannia, the emperor and Lelouch's father, delivers a speech during Prince Clovis' funeral.
7	7	"Attack Cornelia"; Transliteration: "Kōneria o Ute" (Japanese: コーネリアを撃て)	Tsukasa Sunaga	Noriaki Akitaya	Ichirō Ōkouchi	November 17, 2006	June 8, 2008	
Lelouch reminisces about his last meeting with his father; shortly after his mother's death, Lelouch questions Charles about it and is exiled to Japan along with his sister Nunnally vi Britannia. Cornelia issues a challenge to Zero at Saitama Ghetto. Lelouch accepts and infiltrates a soldier's Knightmare while giving orders to the Saitama rebels; the rebels disobey Lelouch's orders and are defeated. Cornelia, having anticipated that Zero would disguise himself as one of her soldiers, prepares an inspection. Lelouch is saved when C.C., disguised as Zero, distracts the Britannian Army, allowing him to escape. Lelouch blames his defeat on the undisciplined rebels and resolves to build his own army.
8	8	"The Black Knights"; Transliteration: "Kuro no Kishidan" (Japanese: 黒の騎士団)	Tsukasa Sunaga	Makoto Baba	Ichirō Ōkouchi	November 24, 2006	June 15, 2008	
A rogue faction of the Japan Liberation Force, a resistance group made up of remnants of the Japanese military, takes a hotel and its occupants' hostage, including Lelouch's friends and a disguised Euphemia. As such, Cornelia cannot make a move against the hostage takers, which Lelouch realizes and takes advantage of. Meanwhile, Euphemia reveals her identity to save Lelouch's friend Nina Einstein. Lelouch mounts a rescue operation with Ohgi's resistance cell, and as he speaks with the hostage takers, Suzaku attempts to save the hostages using the Lancelot. However, Lelouch sinks the floating hotel and derails any rescue efforts by the army so he can take credit for the rescue. Broadcasting publicly to the nation, he announces the creation of the Black Knights, allies of justice who will protect the weak from those with power.
9	9	"Refrain"; Transliteration: "Rifurein" (Japanese: リフレイン)	Kazuya Murata	Kazuya Murata	Ichirō Ōkouchi	December 8, 2006	June 22, 2008	
The Black Knights have been destroying drug cartels which have been manufacturing refrain, a drug that lets a person relive their happiest memories with severe side effects; the drug is popular with the depressed Japanese, which is why the Black Knights are targeting it. Kallen's background is explored, revealing her Japanese mother is working as a maid for her Britannian father and Kallen's disdain for the abuse her mother receives. During the Black Knight's drug raid, Kallen's mother is revealed to be a refrain user and is arrested. While Kallen's mother recovers from the drugs, Kallen promises she will change the world for her.
10	10	"Guren Dances"; Transliteration: "Guren Mau" (Japanese: 紅蓮舞う)	Tsukasa Sunaga	Kazuo Miyake	Ichirō Ōkouchi	December 15, 2006	June 29, 2008	
Cornelia and the Britannian Army heads to Narita, hoping to destroy the remnants of the Japan Liberation Front. Lelouch and the Knights are camping out on Narita, and Oghi begins to distrust Zero. Zero has his Knights follow Cornelia in the hope of capturing her alive so he can question her about his mother's death. As the Britannian forces close in on the Front's headquarters, Kallen utilizes her new Knightmare Frame, the Guren Mk-II, to cause a massive landslide that takes out much of the Britannian forces and civilians.
11	11	"Battle for Narita"; Transliteration: "Narita Kōbōsen" (Japanese: ナリタ攻防戦)	Tsukasa Sunaga	Akira Toba	Ichirō Ōkouchi	December 22, 2006	July 6, 2008	
The Black Knights' assault on the Britannian Army in Narita proves successful and Cornelia is cornered by Kallen and Lelouch. At Euphemia's request, Suzaku rushes onto the battlefield in the Lancelot to rescue Cornelia. He saves her and manages to corner Lelouch. C.C. comes to his rescue by using her powers to mentally traumatize Suzaku. The Black Knights retreat from the conflict, leaving the Japan Liberation Front and the Britannian Army to fight among themselves. C.C. accidentally tells Lelouch her real name. Jeremiah, assumed by both sides to be dead, collapses in front of a truck carrying the same capsules C.C. was originally held in.
12	12	"The Messenger from Kyoto"; Transliteration: "Kyōto kara no Shisha" (Japanese: キョウトからの使者)	Gō Sakamoto	Hiroaki Kudō	Hiroyuki Yoshino	January 5, 2007	July 13, 2008	
Shirley Fenette asks Lelouch out on a date. Suzaku, Lloyd, and Cecile observe the dead from the prior battle. Zero and core members of the Black Knights meet with Taizō Kirihara, one of the most powerful people in the Japanese underground and an acquaintance of Lelouch from his younger days at the Kururugi Shrine. Lelouch deftly displays his tactical prowess and wit before Taizō, revealing his true identity to the man to gain his trust and support. When Lelouch returns to Tokyo for the date, Shirley Fenette informs him of her father's death, indirectly caused by Zero during the Battle of Narita. As she breaks down sobbing, she kisses him.
13	13	"Shirley at Gunpoint"; Transliteration: "Shārī to Jūkō" (Japanese: シャーリーと銃口)	Yō Shinkai	Noriaki Akitaya	Hiroyuki Yoshino	January 12, 2007	July 20, 2008	
Kallen and Lelouch separately reflect upon the deaths of innocents in the Narita campaign, with both vowing to press on. Villetta questions Shirley on Lelouch's involvement with the Black Knights coaxing her to secretly follow Lelouch. There, she witnesses the battle between the Japan Liberation Front and the Britannian Army. Lelouch detonates the Japan Liberation Front freighter as the Britannian Knightmares begin to board it, killing all personnel on board and giving the Black Knights the element of surprise. Suzaku attacks Lelouch forcing him to eject and crash-lands near Shirley. She prepares to kill him to avenge her father, but hesitates when his mask falls off, revealing his identity to her.
14	14	"Geass vs. Geass"; Transliteration: "Giasu tai Giasu" (Japanese: ギアス対ギアス)	Kunihisa Sugishima	Makoto Baba	Ichirō Ōkouchi	January 19, 2007	July 27, 2008	
Lelouch awakens to find his gun gone and blood surrounding him; he believes Shirley may have discovered his identity as Zero. Shirley has returned to Ashfield Academy, but is unable to complete her suicide note, instead returning to Nagita for her father grave; she is pursued by Lelouch and C.C. Ohgi explores the battlefield of the previous night, discovering a wounded Villetta left for dead out of sight. Lelouch encounters Mao, a young man who uses his Geass mind-reading abilities to play on Shirley's insecurities, manipulating her into shooting Lelouch. Shirley misses and collapses from guilt; a flashback reveals she shot Villetta to protect Lelouch. Mao suddenly sees C.C. and declares his undying love, but she manages to send Mao away temporarily. With Shirley torn apart by grief and guilt, Lelouch uses his Geass to erase her memories of him. A confused Shirley greets a saddened Lelouch, who tells her he lost someone very close to him.
15	15	"Cheering Mao"; Transliteration: "Kassai no Mao" (Japanese: 喝采のマオ)	Tsukasa Sunaga	Tōru Yamada	Ichirō Ōkouchi	January 26, 2007	August 3, 2008	
C.C. explains her history with Mao and how his inability to turn his Geass off drove him insane. An injured Villetta wakes up in Ohgi's apartment, and he discovers she has selective amnesia. Lelouch tells Milly, who knows his true identity, that Shirley and he had an argument, so she is ignoring him. C.C. leaves Lelouch to take care of Mao herself, but Mao gains the upper hand when she is unable to kill him, and he incapacitates her. Lelouch utilizes his intellect to fool Mao and rescue C.C. using the Britannian Police to surround and shoot Mao. Safe on a rooftop away from the scene, Lelouch reaffirms his contract with her, promising not to fall victim to his power as Mao did.
16	16	"Nunnally Held Hostage"; Transliteration: "Toraware no Nanarī" (Japanese: 囚われのナナリー)	Tsukasa Sunaga	Kazuo Miyake	Ichirō Ōkouchi	February 2, 2007	August 10, 2008	
C.C. departs as a messenger to the Chinese Federation and Milly has a marriage interview with Lloyd Asplund, creator of the Lancelot. Mao returns to kidnap Nunnally and holds her hostage in the Ashford Academy sewers, surviving as Lelouch instructed the police to 'shoot' and not 'kill' him. Lelouch and Suzaku work together to rescue her, with Suzaku's physical adeptness and the clever use of Lelouch's Geass proving to be beyond Mao's planning. Before he can be arrested, Mao reveals that Suzaku killed his own father; in return, Lelouch silences Mao with his Geass and C.C. returns and kills Mao, admitting she did love him.
17	17	"Knight"; Transliteration: "Kishi" (Japanese: 騎士)	Kazuya Murata	Kazuya Murata	Yūichi Nomura	February 9, 2007	August 24, 2008	
An inauguration ceremony of Clovis' memorial art museum is held, with Euphemia judging the art works. Shirley discovers her discarded suicide note, which mentions Lelouch is Zero. Lelouch agrees to help Kyoshiro Tohdoh's comrades rescue him. During the rescue mission, Lelouch convinces Tohdoh to join the Black Knights. The Lancelot appears and attempts to stop them, but Lelouch is able to predict its movements and plan a counterattack. the Lancelot's cockpit is damaged revealing Suzaku within. Lelouch is shocked and orders an immediate retreat as reinforcements arrive. At the museum, Suzaku is scorned by the Britanians due to his nationality; in return, Euphemia announces to have Suzaku instated as her knight.
18	18	"I Order you, Suzaku Kururugi"; Transliteration: "Kururugi Suzaku ni Meijiru" (Japanese: 枢木スザクに命じる)	Kunihisa Sugishima	Akira Toba	Ichirō Ōkouchi	February 23, 2007	August 31, 2008	
Euphemia knights Suzaku, much to the Britannian's disgust, with Lloyd being the only to clap unprompted. Lelouch establishes the hierarchy of the Black Knights, with Oghi as deputy director and Kallen as head of the elite force. Diethard Reid suggests assassinating Suzaku, but Lelouch has other plans for him. He launches an operation to capture Suzaku and the Lancelot at a Britannia military base on Shikine Island. It almost succeeds, but Schneizel el Britannia appears and orders his floating battleship, the Avalon, to bombard the island, intending to sacrifice Suzaku in order to kill Zero. Euphemia steals a ship to put herself in the blasts way, whilst Kallen runs to the Lancelot to stop Suzaku. A young boy and C.C. watch as Lelouch uses his Geass on Suzaku.
19	19	"Island of the Gods"; Transliteration: "Kami no Shima" (Japanese: 神の島)	Tsukasa Sunaga	Shin'ichi Masaki	Hiroyuki Yoshino	March 2, 2007	September 7, 2008	
The aftermath of the Avalon's arrival inexplicably leaves Lelouch, Euphemia, Kallen, and Suzaku on the mysterious Kamine Island. Suzaku encounters Kallen, and learns she is a Black Knight and the pilot of the Guren, while Euphemia is found by Zero, confirming her suspicions that he is Lelouch. Meanwhile, Schneizel, Lloyd, and Cécile survey the island's ancient ruins. When Lelouch, Kallen, Suzaku, and Euphemia suddenly fall into the ruins, Lelouch and Kallen steals the Knightmare Frame Gawain to escape. As Suzaku is detained for insubordination, it is revealed that Lelouch used Geass on Suzaku, giving him the command to 'live', through which he prioritized his own survival over Zero's capture. Elsewhere, the exiled Japanese government from seven years ago launches a full-scale assault on Kyūshū with the help of the Chinese Federation.
20	20	"Battle at Kyushu"; Transliteration: "Kyūshū Sen'eki" (Japanese: キュウシュウ戦役)	Tsukasa Sunaga	Hiroaki Kudō	Yūichi Nomura	March 9, 2007	September 14, 2008	
The Britannian Army fights back against the Kyūshū invaders with the Lancelot. Meanwhile, Nina, who has slowly grown romantically obsessed with Euphemia since she saved her, meets her and inadvertently gives Euphemia peace of mind about her feelings for Suzaku. As Suzaku fights, she declares her love for him, which he returns. Suzaku becomes cornered when his Lancelot's power runs out, Zero and C.C. fly into the battlefield in the Gawain to recharge the Lancelot; the two Knightmares end the Kyūshū campaign together. Lelouch's father, Charles, and Prince Schneizel discuss the events. Euphemia tells Suzaku she wants a place where everyone she loves can be happy.
21	21	"The School Festival Declaration"; Transliteration: "Gakuen-sai Sengen!" (Japanese: 学園祭宣言!)	Kunihisa Sugishima	Noriaki Akitaya	Ichirō Ōkouchi	March 16, 2007	September 21, 2008	
The Ashford Academy holds their annual school festival. Ohgi and Villetta go to the event together, having developed feelings for each other, where they meet Kallen. Shirley, meanwhile, has grown increasingly suspicious of Lelouch and searches for him. The four of them, plus Suzaku, Lelouch, and C.C. have a series of close encounters risks the revealing of their hidden identities. Euphemia arrives and reunites with Nunnally and Lelouch, and when Euphemia's presence is revealed, mass panic ensues. On live television, she announces her plan to turn the area around Mount Fuji to become a Specially Administrated Zone of Japan (SAZOJ), where Elevens can be referred to as Japanese again. She believes this will bring back the happy days with Lelouch and Nunnally, but Lelouch thinks otherwise, knowing she is being naive.
22	22	"Bloodstained Euphy"; Transliteration: "Chizome no Yufi" (Japanese: 血染めのユフィ)	Tsukasa Sunaga	Makoto Baba	Ichirō Ōkouchi	March 23, 2007	October 5, 2008	
Everyone discusses Euphemia's announcement, with differing opinions. Lelouch's geass is increasing, and he almost harms his friend Rivalz. During the commemoration ceremony for the SAZOJ, Lelouch arrives as Zero; he and Euphemia privately discuss Japan's future. Lelouch intends to Geass Euphemia into shooting him non-fatally, but she convinces him of her ideals. Lelouch summarily halts his rebellion, and as he explains his Geass, he suddenly loses control while jokingly telling her to kill all the Japanese. Sobbing and begging Lelouch to make her stop, the Geass-influenced Euphemia orders a massacre of the people attending the ceremony, taking a machine gun herself. Blaming himself, a resolute Lelouch decides to salvage the situation by declaring Euphemia's SAZOJ a trap to lure out the Black Knights and commands his troops to defeat the Britannian forces, protect the Japanese, and to kill Euphemia.
23	23	"At Least with Sorrow"; Transliteration: "Semete Kanashimi to Tomo ni" (Japanese: せめて哀しみとともに)	Kunihisa Sugishima	Shin'ichi Masaki	Ichirō Ōkouchi Yūichi Nomura	March 30, 2007	October 12, 2008	
Euphemia takes control of a Mech and fights Kallen. Lelouch locates a delirious Euphemia, who asks him to help her save the Japanese, and shoots her. Suzaku witnesses the shooting and brings Euphemia to the Avalon for emergency treatment. Euphemia fights off the Geass and has a last talk with Suzaku before dying; while Suzaku mourns over her death, V.V. introduces himself and explains why Euphemia caused the massacre. It is revealed C.C. is telepathically communicating with Marianne. Jeremiah, who has been experimented on, breaks out of his containment. Villetta is attacked by a group of Japanese men, believing her to be a spy. A distraught Suzaku decides to throw away his morals and kill Zero. Meanwhile, Zero announces his plan to overthrow Britannia and to create a new country called the United States of Japan. Soon, the entirety of Area 11 revolts against the Britannian Empire and the Black Knights advance towards the Tokyo Settlement.
24	24	"The Collapsing Stage"; Transliteration: "Hōraku no Sutēji" (Japanese: 崩落のステージ)	Tsukasa Sunaga	Kazuo Miyake	Ichirō Ōkouchi	July 29, 2007	October 19, 2008	
Jeremiah overhears Zero's broadcast, and falls into a murderous rage. The Black Knights are able to push the Britannian Army back and use Ashford Academy as their headquarters. Villetta regains her memories due to her attack, and is disgusted that she would love someone Japanese; she infiltrates the school and shoots Oghi. Shirley confirms her suspicions of Lelouch tampering with her memory, and attempts to confront Zero, but Kallen instead reveals her identity to her friends. Lelouch and C.C. battle against Suzaku and are able to lure him into a trap which drains his Lancelot's power. Lelouch confronts Cornelia and has the Geass-influenced Andreas Darlton incapacitate Cornelia's Knightmare, before killing him. Meanwhile, Nunnally is visited by V.V., who intends to take her away.
25	25	"Zero" (Japanese: ゼロ)	Tsukasa Sunaga	Akira Toba	Ichirō Ōkouchi	July 29, 2007	October 26, 2008	
Lelouch uses Geass on Cornelia and discovers she does not know who killed his mother, Marianne, but suspects their brother Schneizel and Marianne ordered for her guard to be removed. The Black Knights take Lelouch's friends hostage, unaware of his connection to them. Lloyd and Cécile discover a traumatized Nina threatening to set off a nuclear bomb to avenge Euphemia. C.C. senses that Nunnally has been taken to Kamine Island and Lelouch abandons the Black Knights to rescue her, leaving them scattered and easily defeated. There, C.C. stays behind to stall Jeremiah, pulling them both to the bottom of the ocean, where she implodes from pressure. At the thought elevator, Lelouch is confronted by Suzaku. While Kallen watches on, Suzaku shoots Lelouch's mask revealing his identity to the two of them. Lelouch pleads with Suzaku to help him save Nunnally but is rebuffed; off-screen, the two fire their guns at each other.

== Recap specials ==
No. overall	No. in season	Title	Original release date	Ref.
8.5	8.5	"The Track of the Mask" (Note: The recap special was never officially translated into English. Its current title is a literal translation by IGN.); Transliteration: "Kamen no Kizeki" (Japanese: 仮面の軌跡)	December 1, 2006	
Lelouch monologues the first eight episodes in this recap special.
17.5	17.5	"The Truth of the Mask"; Transliteration: "Kamen no Shinjitsu" (Japanese: 仮面の真実)	February 16, 2007	
Lelouch recaps his friendship with Suzaku and reaffirms his current goals.

== Home media release ==
=== Japanese ===
Bandai Visual released the episodes in nine volumes in DVD, Blu-ray, and Universal Media Disc media format. The nine volumes were compressed into two volumes and released as DVD Magazines. The Black Rebellion is a special edition which concentrates the series into one disc. Eventually, the nine volumes were released as a box collection in DVD and Blu-ray format.

Bandai Visual (Japan, Region 2)
Volume	Episodes	DVD release date	Blu-ray release date	UMD release date
Volume 1	1	January 26, 2007	August 22, 2008	February 23, 2010
Volume 2	2–4	February 23, 2007	September 26, 2008	February 23, 2010
Volume 3	5–7	March 23, 2007	October 24, 2008	February 23, 2010
Volume 4	8–10	April 25, 2007	November 21, 2008	February 23, 2010
Volume 5	11–13	May 25, 2007	December 19, 2008	February 23, 2010
Volume 6	14–16	June 22, 2007	January 23, 2009	February 23, 2010
Volume 7	17–19	July 27, 2007	February 20, 2009	February 23, 2010
Volume 8	20–22	August 24, 2007	March 27, 2009	February 23, 2010
Volume 9	23–25	September 25, 2007	April 24, 2009	February 23, 2010
DVD Magazine	1–13	December 21, 2007	None	None
DVD Magazine 2	14–25	January 25, 2008	None	None
Black Rebellion	Condensation of 1–25	February 22, 2008	July 24, 2009	None
Box collection	1–25	January 27, 2012	September 25, 2013	None

=== English ===
In North America, Bandai Entertainment released the four volumes containing the first seventeen episodes. Bandai then released the series into three volumes labeled as parts. A box collection of the series was released on March 22, 2011.

Bandai Entertainment (North America, Region 1 DVD)
Volume	Episodes	Release date	Ref.
Volume 1	1–5	August 5, 2008	
Volume 2	6–10	August 5, 2008	
Volume 3	11–13	December 2, 2008	
Volume 4	14–17	December 2, 2008	
Part 1	1–9	August 5, 2008	
Part 2	10–17	December 2, 2008	
Part 3	18–25	February 24, 2009	
Box Collection	1–25	March 22, 2011	

In the United Kingdom, Beez Entertainment and Kazé released the series as a box collection. Beez's DVD box collection was released on March 21, 2011. Kazé announced its acquisition of the series during the London MCM Expo in October 2012. Kazé released a DVD and Blu-ray box collection on January 21, 2013, and had Manga Entertainment distribute the series. In Australasia, Madman Entertainment released a DVD collection on November 18, 2009, and a Blu-ray collection on April 17, 2013.

=== Picture drama ===
The picture drama (ピクチャードラマ, Pikuchā Dorama) episodes are still images and character voices used to tell a story. In Japan, a picture drama was added to every individual volume. In 2013, a Blu-ray box collection was released and contained a new picture drama episode. In North America, three picture dramas were added to every part.

Title	Japan	North America
"Stage 0.25"	Volume 1	Part 1
Lelouch and Nunnally arrive in Japan, where they are given a run-down storage room by the Kururugi family to live in. Lelouch exaggerates to Nunnally about the positive qualities of their new home. Suzaku overhears and believes Lelouch is sarcastically insulting his family. When he realizes Lelouch was lying to Nunnally to comfort her, he apologizes and leaves in embarrassment.
"Stage 0.97"	Blu-ray box collection	None
Lelouch monologues on his dissatisfaction with Britannia's rule and the need to hide his and Nunnally's connection to the Britannian throne.
"Stage 3.25"	Volume 2	Part 1
After Clovis's funeral, Milly, Kallen, Nina and Shirley take a bath together and gossip about Lelouch, Milly and Nina's past.
"Stage 4.33"	Volume 3	Part 2
Jeremiah and Villetta discuss their plan on using Suzaku to push for the purist reform. Jeremiah reveals his biggest regrets in life were his failure to prevent Marianne's death, and later the supposed deaths of Lelouch and Nunnally. The two then prepare to escort Suzaku for his trial.
"Stage 6.75"	Volume 4	Part 1
Suzaku shares his past with Rivalz Cardemonde, revealing he worked at an automobile shop before joining the military and that he lives alone. Later, Suzaku returns to the military base where Cecile persuades him to treat their work environment as a home.
"Stage 8.75"	Volume 5	Part 2
Lelouch and friends are at a beach resort where Cornelia is delivering a speech. During her speech, Lelouch monologues on training Nunnally to become emperor.
"Stage 9.33"	Volume 6	Part 3
Milly arranges a cross-dressing festival for the school and Lelouch and friends participate. The girls fight over Lelouch and conclude with Milly demanding him to choose a girlfriend.
"Stage 9.75"	Volume 7	Part 2
Nunnally asks Lelouch of his relationship with C.C. and puts him through a deep thought in an attempt to dissuade her suspicion. Sayoko interrupts their conversation in order to teach Nunnally how to perform Japanese curses.
"Stage 22.25"	Volume 8	Part 3
Nunnally is watching Japan's Special Administrative Zone induction on television and reminisces about the sleepover she had with Euphemia. Meanwhile, Euphemia returns after her meeting with Zero and the media cuts all broadcasts.
"Stage 23.95"	Volume 9	Part 3
Suzaku's recalls a childhood memory about Lelouch's promise to destroy Britannia. Suzaku monologues his regret on failing to dissuade Lelouch from revenge and departs to confront him.
