= List of Code Geass season 2 episodes =

Anime series

Code Geass: Lelouch of the Rebellion R2
- Season 2
- The cover of Code Geass: Lelouch of the Rebellion R2 Part 4 released by Bandai Entertainment
- No. of episodes: 25

Release
- Original network: JNN (MBS, TBS)
- Original release: April 6 – September 28, 2008

Season chronology
- ← Previous; Season 1: Lelouch of the Rebellion

The second season of the Code Geass anime series, titled Code Geass: Lelouch of the Rebellion R2 (Japanese: コードギアス 反逆のルルーシュ R2, Hepburn: Kōdo Giasu: Hangyaku no Rurūshu R2), is produced by Sunrise, Mainichi Broadcasting System, and Project Geass. The series was directed by Gorō Taniguchi who has also worked with Ichirō Ōkouchi on the script. The characters were conceived by Clamp and designed by Takahiro Kimura. R2 takes place a year after the events of the first series. The coup d'état by the Black Knights, led by the protagonist, Lelouch vi Britannia, ended in failure and resulted in Lelouch's capture and brainwashing. Since then, the coup has been referred to as the Black Rebellion.

R2 was first announced in the April 2007 edition of Newtype. Early screening for the first episode was held in March 2008 in Tokyo Dome City and Osaka Mido Hall. The series premiered on April 6, 2008, on MBS TV and Tokyo Broadcasting System Television; it was later broadcast on sixteen other stations. The third episode was partly leaked four days before its intended air date due to human error. The final episode aired on September 28, 2008. Bandai Visual encapsulated the series into nine volumes in DVD, Blu-ray, and Universal Media Disc formats; each volume contained a picture drama episode as a bonus. Bandai Visual later released a singular adaption of the series called Zero Requiem, and later released the series in a box collection.

The first episode premiered on Adult Swim on November 2, 2008, a week after the final episode of the first series was aired. Adult Swim restarted R2 in a new time slot by re-airing the first episode the week after and aired the final episode on June 7, 2009. Bandai Entertainment released the series in four DVD volumes and a DVD box between August 2009 and February 2012. During the 2013 Otakon, Funimation announced its acquisition of the series. In the United Kingdom, Kazé released the series as a DVD and Blu-ray box collection. In Australasia, Madman Entertainment released a single volume and a DVD and Blu-ray box collection. In anticipation for the DVD volume release, Madman streamed the episodes on a weekly basis beginning on October 27, 2009.

The episodes use four pieces of theme music: two opening and two ending themes. The opening and ending themes for the first 12 episodes are "O2" (O2〜オー･ツー〜, Ō Tsū) and "Shiawase Neiro" (シアワセネイロ, lit. "Happy Timbre") respectively and were both performed by Orange Range. For the rest of the season, the opening theme is "World End" performed by Flow and the ending theme is "Waga Rōtashi Aku no Hana" (わが﨟たし悪の華, lit. "My Beautifully Elegant Flower of Evil") performed by Ali Project.

For the 15th anniversary rebroadcast edition, the opening theme for the first twelve episodes is "Face2" by Lozareena and the ending theme is "Mushoku Tōmei" (無色透明, lit. "Colorless and Transparent") by Yūtarō Yamashita. For the rest of the season, the opening theme is "Daydream Believer" by Flow and Orange Range, and the ending theme is "Z.E.R.O." by Blue Encount.

== Episode list ==
No. overall	No. in season	Title	Storyboarded by	Directed by	Written by	Original release date	English air date	Ref.
26	1	"The Day a Demon Awakens"; Transliteration: "Majin ga Mezameru Hi" (Japanese: 魔神が目覚める日)	Tsukasa Sunaga	Noriaki Akitaya	Ichirō Ōkouchi	April 6, 2008	November 2, 2008	
A year after the Black Rebellion, a brainwashed Lelouch vi Britannia and his pseudo-younger brother, Rolo, are gambling at Babel Tower when the Black Knights, led by C.C., launch an attack on the complex to retrieve Lelouch. The secret service agents that were monitoring Lelouch reveal themselves and attempt to capture C.C., but she restores Lelouch's memories allowing him to use his Geass to kill his enemies and resume his role as Zero, the masked leader of the Black Knights. Elsewhere, Suzaku Kururugi declares to Emperor Charles zi Britannia and the Knights of the Round that Zero is his responsibility to kill.
27	2	"Plan for Independent Japan"; Transliteration: "Nippon Dokuritsu Keikaku" (Japanese: 日本独立計画)	Tsukasa Sunaga	Akira Toba	Ichirō Ōkouchi	April 13, 2008	November 16, 2008	
Lelouch reminisces about his capture by Suzaku and how the Emperor, his father, altered his memories with Geass. Lelouch directs the Black Knights to launch a counterattack against the Britannian army and reconciles with Kallen Stadtfeld. The Black Knights are overwhelmed by the Knightmare Frame Vincent but are able to collapse Babel Tower in time to retreat to the Chinese Federation consulate, forcing the Britannian army to retreat. From there, a broadcast of Zero is aired, announcing his return and the recreation of the United States of Japan.
28	3	"Imprisoned in Campus"; Transliteration: "Toraware no Gakuen" (Japanese: 囚われの学園)	Kazuya Murata	Makoto Baba	Ichirō Ōkouchi	April 20, 2008	November 23, 2008	
Lelouch returns to Ashford Academy during the broadcast, causing Villeta Nu's Special Division to have doubts he was the Zero on television. Lelouch investigates Nunnally's whereabouts and realizes the whole school's memories were altered to remove her existence. Gilbert G.P. Guilford delivers an ultimatum to Zero: reveal himself or let the incarcerated Black Knights face execution. Lelouch concocts a plan to distract the Special Division while he tries to use his Geass on Rolo. His plan fails when Rolo uses his Geass and stops Lelouch's sense of time.
29	4	"Counterattack at the Gallows"; Transliteration: "Gyakushū no Shokeidai" (Japanese: 逆襲の処刑台)	Kunihisa Sugishima	Kazuo Miyake	Ichirō Ōkouchi	April 27, 2008	November 30, 2008	
Lelouch deduces the nature of Rolo's Geass and convinces Rolo to spare him; in return, he will hand over C.C. Meanwhile, Li Xingke kills the High Eunuch, Gao Hai and takes command of the Chinese Federation consulate. As the deadline approaches, Guilford prepares to execute the captured Black Knights until Zero appears. Lelouch collapses the flooring, causing the Britannian military to fall into Chinese territory where they are politically restrained from attacking. While the Black Knights rescue the prisoners, Rolo tries to kill Lelouch for his betrayal. Lelouch arranges a charade to seemingly save Rolo's life; using this and their pseudo-brotherly relationship, he convinces Rolo to join the Black Knights.
30	5	"Knights of the Round"; Transliteration: "Naito obu Raunzu" (Japanese: ナイトオブラウンズ)	Tsukasa Sunaga	Masato Miyoshi Noriaki Akitaya	Ichirō Ōkouchi	May 4, 2008	December 7, 2008	
Suzaku returns to Ashford Academy to determine if Lelouch has regained his memories. The academy throws a festival to welcome Suzaku's return and C.C's attendance causes a series of events as Lelouch tries to hide her presence. After placing the Secret Division under his control with Geass, Lelouch blackmails Villeta into his servitude. Later, Suzaku tests Lelouch's memories by putting him on the phone with Nunnally, who is to become the new viceroy of Japan.
31	6	"Surprise Attack over the Pacific"; Transliteration: "Taiheiyō Kishū Sakusen" (Japanese: 太平洋奇襲作戦)	Tsukasa Sunaga	Akira Toba	Ichirō Ōkouchi	May 11, 2008	December 14, 2008	
Rolo uses his Geass to buy Lelouch time to converse with Nunnally without revealing his restored memories to Suzaku. Lelouch orders the Black Knights to capture Nunnally as she is transported to Japan by airship. Successfully boarding the vessel, Zero meets and tries to convince her that Britannia is using her as a figurehead. Nunnally reveals she volunteered for the position and states she wishes to continue the Specially Administrated Zone of Japan (SAZOJ), requesting Zero to join her. Britannian reinforcements hinder the Black Knights' assault and Suzaku manages to retrieve Nunnally.
32	7	"The Abandoned Mask"; Transliteration: "Suterareta Kamen" (Japanese: 棄てられた仮面)	Kazuya Murata	Makoto Baba	Ichirō Ōkouchi	May 18, 2008	January 11, 2009	
Nunnally is sworn in as the new Viceroy and announces the restoration of the SAZOJ. Knowing he cannot go against his sister, Lelouch slips into a state of depression. Before he can relinquish himself to drugs, Kallen steps in, reminding him of his responsibilities as Zero. Meanwhile, the Black Knights are under attack by a Britannian naval fleet led by Suzaku. Rushing to the battlefield, Zero leads the Black Knights to victory. He then announces his intention to accept Nunnally's offer to join the SAZOJ.
33	8	"One Million Miracles"; Transliteration: "Hyakuman no Kiseki" (Japanese: 百万のキセキ)	Kunihisa Sugishima	Kazuo Miyake	Ichirō Ōkouchi	May 25, 2008	January 18, 2009	
In a private conversation with Suzaku, Gino Weinberg, Anya Alstreim, Lloyd Asplund, Cécile Croomy, and Alicia Lohmeyer, Zero requests he be exiled from Japan in exchange for delivering one million Japanese to the SAZOJ. During the opening ceremony, every participating Japanese dresses as Zero on cue, giving Suzaku no choice but to exile all rather than start another massacre.
34	9	"A Bride in the Vermillion Forbidden City"; Transliteration: "Shukinjō no Hanayome" (Japanese: 朱禁城の花嫁)	Tsukasa Sunaga	Kazuo Sakai	Ichirō Ōkouchi	June 8, 2008	January 25, 2009	
Lelouch learns the Chinese Empress, Tianzi, is being forced into a political marriage to First Prince Odysseus eu Britannia. The wedding is orchestrated by the High Eunuchs, who will become nobles of Britannia in exchange for turning over half their land to Second Prince Schneizel el Britannia. As the wedding begins, Li Xingke initiates a coup d'état to overthrow the Eunuchs and save the Empress; in the chaos, Zero appears and takes Tianzi hostage.
35	10	"When Shen Hu Wins Glory"; Transliteration: "Shenfū Kagayaku Toki" (Japanese: 神虎輝く刻)	Tsukasa Sunaga	Akira Toba	Ichirō Ōkouchi	June 15, 2008	February 1, 2009	
Lelouch successfully escapes with Empress Tianzi. Desperate to recover the Empress, the Eunuchs agree to forgive Li Xingke if he rescues her. To that end, he is granted use of the Knightmare Frame Shen Hu. Kallen intercepts him with the Guren Mk-II but its power runs out and she is captured. With the Black Knights cornered, the Eunuchs and Britannian forces turn against Li Xingke and his rebels.
36	11	"Power of Passion"; Transliteration: "Omoi no Chikara" (Japanese: 想いの力)	Tsukasa Sunaga	Yū Nobuta	Ichirō Ōkouchi	June 22, 2008	February 8, 2009	
Realizing the Eunuchs are not interested in saving Tianzi, Li Xingke rebels. As the Black Knights hold their ground against the Chinese Federation and Britannian forces, Zero tries to reason with the Eunuchs, who openly admit their treason. Having waited for this moment, the Black Knights broadcast the Eunuch's confession and Zero uses the Shinkirō to destroy most of the Chinese Federation's forces. The broadcast causes rebellions to occur throughout the Chinese Federation, forcing Britannia to retreat on political grounds. With the Eunuchs dead, Zero forges an alliance with Xingke and Tianzi. He returns to Ashford Academy and finds Anya and Gino enrolled as students.
37	12	"Love Attack!"; Transliteration: "Rabu Atakku!" (Japanese: ラブアタック!)	Kunihiro Mori Tsukasa Sunaga	Noriaki Akitaya	Ichirō Ōkouchi	June 29, 2008	February 15, 2009	
Sayoko Shinozaki, having been posing as Lelouch at school, filled his schedule with dates. As he goes through the schedule, Milly Ashford hosts her graduation event called Cupid Day, an event where any girl can become a boy's girlfriend by stealing his hat and vice versa. Milly places a bounty on Lelouch causing most of the school to target him. As Rolo and Sayoko help Lelouch avoid the students, Shirley Fenette trades hats with him after a personal talk. Shortly after, Jeremiah Gottwald arrives in Japan and tests his Geass Canceller in public; this undoes Shirley's brainwashing and restores her memories of Nunnally and Lelouch's identity as Zero.
38	13	"Assassin from the Past"; Transliteration: "Kako kara no Shikaku" (Japanese: 過去からの刺客)	Kazuya Murata	Kazuhiro Yoneda	Ichirō Ōkouchi	July 6, 2008	February 22, 2009	
Lelouch heads to the train station to check on the delivery of the G Trains, a network of Gefjun Disturber-equipped trains that will blackout Tokyo once activated. Meanwhile, Jeremiah finds and corners Lelouch. After learning why Lelouch betrayed the Emperor, Jeremiah joins his cause. Shirley reconciles with her restored memories and asks Suzaku to forgive Lelouch as she has. Before she can reach Lelouch, she runs into Rolo, who shoots her when she reveals knowledge of Nunnally's true identity as Lelouch's sister. Lelouch discovers a dying Shirley who professes her love to him.
39	14	"Geass Hunt"; Transliteration: "Giasu Gari" (Japanese: ギアス狩り)	Tsukasa Sunaga	Kazuo Miyake	Ichirō Ōkouchi	July 13, 2008	March 1, 2009	
Rolo admits to causing Shirley's death; rather than blame Rolo specifically, Lelouch blames the existence of Geass itself. In retaliation, he mounts an assault on the Geass Order, slaughtering everyone within the stronghold. V.V. pilots the Siegfried in an effort to stop the Black Knights but is defeated by Lelouch and Cornelia li Britannia. Lelouch is then transported to a separate dimension known as the Sword of Akasha where he is confronted by Charles. Elsewhere, Suzaku suspects Lelouch murdered Shirley and decides to interrogate Kallen with drugs.
40	15	"The C's World"; Transliteration: "Shī no Sekai" (Japanese: Cの世界)	Tsukasa Sunaga	Makoto Baba	Ichirō Ōkouchi	July 20, 2008	March 8, 2009	
Suzaku, realizing he cannot stoop to Lelouch's level to achieve his goals, forgoes the interrogation; he investigates Ashford Academy and discovers the Special Division has been compromised. Ohgi and Villetta meet in the woods, where she intends to kill him, but Ohgi confesses he has fallen in love with her. Meanwhile, Charles has become immortal after killing and gaining V.V.'s powers. C.C. transports Lelouch to her unconscious mind to protect him from Charles. There, Lelouch witnesses her past, and returns to the Sword of Akasha to save C.C.; the two return to reality where Lelouch discovers C.C. has become an amnesiac.
41	16	"United Federation of Nations Resolution Number One"; Transliteration: "Chōgasshūkoku Ketsugi Daiichigō" (Japanese: 超合集国決議第壱號)	Tsukasa Sunaga	Tatsuya Abe	Ichirō Ōkouchi	July 27, 2008	May 3, 2009	
The Black Knights rally forty-seven countries to form the United Federation of Nations (UFN); they then declare war against Britannia to liberate Japan. In anticipation, the Knights of the Round and the bulk of Britannia's military are transferred to Japan. Nina Einstein has the Lancelot equipped with a warhead called the Field Limitary Effective Implosion Armament (FLEIJA). The Emperor interrupts the Federation's announcement to challenge Zero to a battle for the world itself. Fearing for Nunnally's safety, Lelouch admits his identity to Suzaku and asks him to save her. Suzaku agrees, on the condition they meet alone.
42	17	"The Taste of Humiliation"; Transliteration: "Tsuchi no Aji" (Japanese: 土の味)	Masamitsu Hidaka Tamayo Yamamoto	Hiroaki Kudō	Ichirō Ōkouchi	August 3, 2008	May 10, 2009	
Suzaku and Lelouch meet to discuss Nunnally and after some animosity, Lelouch manages to win Suzaku over by agreeing to end the war and return peace to the world. However, Schneizel interrupts and has his personal guard arrest Lelouch, making him believe Suzaku has betrayed him. Schneizel and Lelouch have a private chat until Lelouch is rescued by a Geass-controlled Guilford. Using the G Trains, Lelouch shuts down the Tokyo Settlement and the Black Knights begin their attack.
43	18	"Final Battle Tokyo II"; Transliteration: "Dainiji Tōkyō Kessen" (Japanese: 第二次東京決戦)	Tsukasa Sunaga	Akira Toba	Ichirō Ōkouchi	August 10, 2008	May 10, 2009	
Rolo attempts to locate and kill Nunnally while Sayoko frees Kallen and escorts her to the Guren. On the verge of death, Suzaku's Geass command activates and compels him to fire the FLEIJA. The warhead detonates over the government complex, obliterating a massive section of the settlement. Lelouch breaks down when Rolo tells him Nunnally was killed in the explosion.
44	19	"Betrayal"; Transliteration: "Uragiri" (Japanese: 裏切り)	Kazuya Murata	Noriaki Akitaya	Ichirō Ōkouchi	August 17, 2008	May 17, 2009	
A ceasefire is called so Schneizel can meet with the leaders of the Black Knights, but Lelouch is too devastated to attend. Schneizel reveals Zero's identity and powers and convinces the Black Knights that they are under Lelouch's Geass. In exchange for Japan's independence, the Black Knights agree to betray Lelouch. Lelouch is prepared to accept death until Rolo rescues him. During their escape, Rolo overtaxes his heart with his Geass power and as a result dies after flying Lelouch to safety. Lelouch resolves to not waste the life given to him by Rolo and resolves to kill the Emperor.
45	20	"Emperor Dismissed"; Transliteration: "Kōtei Shikkaku" (Japanese: 皇帝失格)	Tsukasa Sunaga	Kazuo Miyake	Ichirō Ōkouchi	August 24, 2008	May 17, 2009	
As the Emperor begins a plan called Ragnarök, Lelouch and Suzaku head to Kamine Island separately to face him. No longer restrained by his notions of wrong methods being meaningless, Suzaku strikes a deal with Schneizel to become the Knight of One in exchange for assassinating the Emperor. Anya's mind is taken over by Marianne vi Britannia, Lelouch's mother, and she restores C.C.'s memories; the two then travel to Kamine Island. At Kamine Island, Suzaku is held at bay by Bismarck Waldstein, while Lelouch marches into the Sword of Akasha. Knowing he cannot kill his father, Lelouch destroys the entrance, planning to seal them both inside for eternity.
46	21	"The Ragnarök Connection"; Transliteration: "Ragunareku no Setsuzoku" (Japanese: ラグナレクの接続)	Tsukasa Sunaga	Makoto Baba	Ichirō Ōkouchi	August 31, 2008	May 24, 2009	
Within the Sword of Akasha, Lelouch learns the truth of his mother's death from the Emperor and Marianne herself. They reveal Ragnarök will merge everyone into the collective unconscious. However, Lelouch disagrees with their reasoning, believing there is no future in that life, and uses his Geass on the collective unconscious to stop Ragnarök, resulting in his parents' deaths. One month later, Lelouch forcefully inaugurates himself as the new Emperor of Britannia with Suzaku now at his side.
47	22	"Emperor Lelouch"; Transliteration: "Kōtei Rurūshu" (Japanese: 皇帝ルルーシュ)	Kazuya Murata	Yū Nobuta Masato Miyoshi	Ichirō Ōkouchi	September 7, 2008	May 24, 2009	
Lelouch begins his reformation of Britannia, abolishing the aristocracy and Area system. The Knights of the Round attempt to remove Lelouch from power but are defeated by Suzaku piloting the Lancelot Albion. His position secure, Lelouch announces his intention to join the UFN, but when they demand he accept a limit to his voting power to prevent Britannia from attaining an automatic majority, Lelouch forces their hand by having Suzaku take the UFN's leaders hostage. In the commotion, the Britannian capital is obliterated by Schneizel aboard his new flying fortress, the Damocles. Schneizel reveals to Lelouch that Nunnally is alive and has sided with him.
48	23	"Schneizel's Guise"; Transliteration: "Shunaizeru no Kamen" (Japanese: シュナイゼルの仮面)	Shishō Igarashi (Note: Credited under the pen name "Tatsuya Igarashi" (五十嵐 達矢, Igarashi Tatsuya).)	Shishō Igarashi	Ichirō Ōkouchi	September 14, 2008	May 31, 2009	
Schneizel unveils his plan to position the Damocles in such a way as to strike every warring nation in the world, thus enforcing peace through threat of annihilation. Lelouch declares Nunnally his enemy during their conversation but hesitates in opposing her. With some words from Suzaku and C.C.'s comfort, Lelouch comes to his senses and focuses on his original task. Schneizel, backed by the Black Knights and the remaining Knights of the Round, wages war with Lelouch's army.
49	24	"The Grip of Damocles"; Transliteration: "Damokuresu no Sora" (Japanese: ダモクレスの空)	Tsukasa Sunaga	Akira Toba	Ichirō Ōkouchi	September 21, 2008	May 31, 2009	
Using Nina's FLEIJA Eliminator, Lelouch and Suzaku successfully bypass the barrier of the Damocles. Believing Lelouch to be trapped, Schneizel sets the self-destruct sequence of the Damocles and attempts to leave. However, Lelouch uses Geass on Schneizel and forces him into obedience; afterwards Lelouch confronts Nunnally, who has regained her sight.
50	25	"Re;"	Tsukasa Sunaga Kazuya Murata	Kazuya Murata, (Note: Credited as Directing Supervisor (演出統括, Enshutsu tōkatsu).) Noriaki Akitaya, Kazuo Miyake, Makoto Baba, Fumiya Kitajō	Ichirō Ōkouchi	September 28, 2008	June 7, 2009	
Suzaku and Kallen's duel intensifies, leading to a final exchange which disables the Guren and destroys the Lancelot, seemingly killing Suzaku. Lelouch uses his Geass to force Nunnally to give up the key of the Damocles. With the fortress now under his control, Lelouch unites the world under his tyrannical rule. Two months later, Lelouch prepares to oversee the public execution of the leaders of the UFN and the Black Knights. According to their plan, dubbed the Zero Requiem, Suzaku disguises himself as Zero and fatally stabs Lelouch before they can proceed with the executions. Having now deduced her brother's plan, Nunnally cries over Lelouch as he dies from his injury. Some time later, the world unites in their hatred of Lelouch and begins an era of peace with Nunnally now serving as the Empress of Britannia.

== Home media release ==
=== Japanese ===
Bandai Visual released the episodes in nine volumes in DVD, Blu-ray, and Universal Media Disc media format. The Zero Requiem release is a concentration of the series in one disc. Eventually, the nine volumes were released in a DVD box collection with a slated Blu-ray edition to be released.

Bandai Visual (Japan, Region 2)
Volume	Episodes	DVD release date	Blu-ray release date	UMD release date
Volume 1	1	August 22, 2008	August 22, 2008	March 26, 2010
Volume 2	2–4	September 26, 2008	September 26, 2008	March 26, 2010
Volume 3	5–7	October 24, 2008	October 24, 2008	March 26, 2010
Volume 4	8–10	November 21, 2008	November 21, 2008	March 26, 2010
Volume 5	11–13	December 19, 2008	December 19, 2008	March 26, 2010
Volume 6	14–16	January 23, 2009	January 23, 2009	March 26, 2010
Volume 7	17–19	February 20, 2009	February 20, 2009	March 26, 2010
Volume 8	20–22	March 27, 2009	March 27, 2009	March 26, 2010
Volume 9	23–25	April 24, 2009	April 24, 2009	March 26, 2010
Zero Requiem	Condensation of 1–25	September 22, 2011	July 24, 2009	None
Box collection	1–25	February 24, 2012	March 26, 2014	None

==== Picture drama ====
The picture drama (ピクチャードラマ, Pikuchā Dorama) episodes are still images and character voices used to tell a story. In Japan, a picture drama was added to every DVD or Blu-ray volume. In 2014, a Blu-ray box collection was released and contained a new picture drama episode.

Picture drama episode list
Title	Packaged in Japan with
"Turn 0.923"	Volume 1
C.C. and Kallen discuss their current lives and the upcoming plan to retrieve Lelouch.
"Turn 0.56"	Volume 2
Suzaku, Gino, and Anya find a girl among the rubble in the latest area they recently conquered. The girl blames Suzaku for the death of her family.
"Stage 7.19"	Volume 3
Lelouch reminisces about his friends during the time they were preparing for a hand-made dress party.
"Turn 9.34"	Volume 4
C.C., Kallen, and Lelouch sneak into a Chinese Federation party by dressing as belly dancers. There, Lelouch uses Geass on the men to prevent them from supplying Britannia with resources.
"Turn 12.59"	Volume 5
Empress Tianzi hosts a pajama party together with C.C., Kaguya Sumeragi, Rakshata Chawla, Nagisa Chiba and Xianglin as they discuss about men and love.
"Turn 12.31"	Volume 6
Nunnally, Schenizel, Suzaku, Gino, Anya, Guilford, Cécile Croomy, Lloyd Asplund, and Kanon Maldini are attending a casino designed by the late Clovis la Britannia. They have various discussions and concludes with Gino challenging Schenizel to a game where the latter confidently accepts.
"Turn 19.02"	Volume 7
As Rolo nears death, he reminisces about his life with Lelouch and how he was moved by having a family for the first time.
"Turn 22.05"	Volume 8
C.C. and Cecile discuss Zero Requiem and their feelings towards it. They are then joined by Lelouch, Suzaku, Lloyd, and Jeremiah as they prepare for their departure to Japan.
"Turn 25.01"	Volume 9
Nunnally, Suzaku, and Lelouch's friends gather at Ashford Academy to discuss their current lives and to honor Lelouch's sacrifice.
"Turn 12.06"	Blu-ray box collection
Lelouch and friends attend Milly's graduation party.

=== English ===
In North America, Bandai Entertainment released the series in four DVD volumes; each volume release was accompanied with a limited-edition version. Later, Bandai Entertainment released a box collection containing the four volumes.

Bandai Entertainment (North America, Region 1 DVD)
Volume	Episodes	Release date	Ref.
Part 1	1–7	August 18, 2009	
Part 2	8–13	December 1, 2009	
Part 3	14–19	January 19, 2010	
Part 4	20–25	April 6, 2010	
Box Collection	1–25	February 7, 2012	

In the United Kingdom, Kazé announced its acquisition of the series during the London MCM Expo in October 2012. They released the series as a DVD and Blu-ray box collection on March 11, 2013, with distribution by Manga Entertainment. In Australasia, Madman Entertainment released a single volume, then concluded with a DVD box collection on December 20, 2010. The Blu-ray version was released on June 16, 2013.
