= Euphemia li Britannia =

Fictional character in the anime series Code Geass

- Code Geass character
- Euphemia as she appears in the anime
- First appearance: Code Geass Episode 5: "The Princess and the Witch"
- Created by: Gorō Taniguchi; Ichirō Ōkouchi; Clamp
- Portrayed by: Shun Mikami
- Voiced by: Omi Minami (Japanese); Michelle Ruff (English)

In-universe information
- Alias: Massacre Princess (Note: 虐殺皇女, Gyakusatsu Kōjo; "Princess of Massacre" in the English dubs)
- Gender: Female
- Relatives: Charles zi Britannia (father); Cornelia (older sister); Lelouch Lamperouge (half-brother); Nunnally Lamperouge (half-sister); Clovis la Britannia (half-brother); Odysseus eu Britannia (half-brother); Schneizel el Britannia (half-brother)

Euphemia li Britannia (Note: ユーフェミア・リ・ブリタニア, Yūfemia ri Buritania) is a fictional character who appears in Sunrise's anime television series Code Geass: Lelouch of the Rebellion (often referred to simply as Code Geass) In the series, Omi Minami voices the character, while Michelle Ruff plays her in the English dub. Born as the Third Princess of the Britannian Imperial Family, Euphemia is portrayed in Code Geass as the half-sister of the series' protagonist and antihero, Lelouch Lamperouge. Also, Euphemia develops throughout the anime's first season a romantic relationship with the character Suzaku Kururugi.

In addition to the Code Geass anime, Euphemia is featured in subsequent media adaptations of the series, including OVAs, manga and a musical in which she is played by male actor Shun Mikami. The character has received a mostly positive critical reception, with critics praising her design, personality and relationship with Suzaku, while her death is considered one of the saddest moments in the series.

== Appearances ==
=== In Code Geass ===
Euphemia li Britannia appears in the Code Geass anime series, being voiced by Omi Minami in the original Japanese dub, and by Michelle Ruff in the English version. Euphemia is depicted in the Code Geass anime series as the Third Princess of the Britannian Imperial Family and a member of the Holy Britannian Empire. Euphemia is also Lelouch vi Britannia's half-sister and the sister he cared most about after Nunnally; Lelouch even once admits to Euphemia that she was his "first love". Euphemia's look mainly consists of her long pink hair, which is usually styled with two buns on each side of her head. In terms of clothing, she is often seen wearing a pink and white dress with a rose choker. She is a kind-hearted and open-minded woman who despises conflict in any form. Unlike many of her siblings, she is a very optimistic person who treats everyone with respect.

==== Lelouch of the Rebellion ====
Euphemia is introduced in the fifth episode of the first season, in which she meets Suzaku Kururugi, who guides her around Area 11 (Japan), including the war-torn city of Shinjuku. Shortly after meeting him, she reveals to Suzaku her identity and that the reason she is in Area 11 is to become its Sub-Viceroy alongside her older sister, Cornelia. When she is subsequently taken hostage along with a group of tourists by the Japan Liberation Front, Euphemia attempts to use her position as princess to free the other hostages. In his Zero persona, Lelouch has incidentally led the Black Knights to the exact location, which results in his reunion with Euphemia. Though he brandishes a gun at her, he decides against killing her.

Concerned about Euphemia's safety, Cornelia persuades her younger sister to select a Knight to protect her. After resolving the conflict between her ideals and Cornelia's advice, Euphemia chooses Suzaku Kururugi as her Knight. Over time, the two develop romantic feelings and genuinely fall in love with each other, with Euphemia declaring that she orders Suzaku to love her, and in return, she will love every bit of him. After finding Zero while stranded on a mysterious nearby island called Kamine, Euphemia, having deduced Lelouch's identity from their earlier encounter, convinces him to unmask, promising to keep his alter ego a secret.

Returning to the mainland, wanting to help Zero and instill trust in him for the civilian populace, Euphemia announces on live television her intent to form the Special Administrative Zone of Japan in the region under Mount Fuji, giving the Japanese people their name and country back, and govern it alongside Zero. During the administration changeover ceremony, she falls under the accidental influence of Lelouch's Geass, and is reluctantly compelled to kill the Japanese people. She is fatally shot in the stomach by Zero to end the chaos and Suzaku brings Euphemia to the floating battleship Avalon for emergency treatment. She fights off the Geass and has a last conversation with Suzaku before dying from her injuries, unaware of what has happened.

==== Lelouch of the Rebellion R2 ====
Euphemia's death impacts and influences the actions of various characters throughout the second season of the anime. Suzaku becomes emotionally unstable and pursues Zero (whom he blames for Euphemia's demise), having discovered his true identity as Lelouch. Suzaku's actions remain motivated by his memory of Euphemia; he refers to her as an "irreplaceable woman" and carries with him a quill pen she gave him as a memento. Cornelia abandons her position as Viceroy of Area 11 in order to clear her name. Euphemia's half-sister, Nunnally, with her installment as the new Viceroy of Area 11, chooses to continue Euphemia's ideal and reinstate the Special Administrative Zone of Japan.

It is also revealed that Britannia officially declared Euphemia responsible for the massacre and that she had been deprived of her royal status and executed by the Britannian Army. After the incident, she comes to be known as the "Massacre Princess" to the general Japanese public in Area 11. However, when Lelouch becomes Emperor of Britannia near the end of the series, he explains to Suzaku that he intends to shed enough blood to make the name of the Massacre Princess be forgotten. In this respect, Lelouch is successful; following his Zero Requiem plan, all the hatred originally focused on Euphemia is redirected to Lelouch, making her a martyr rather than a scapegoat.

=== In other media ===
==== Manga ====
Euphemia is featured in the manga adaptation of Code Geass, whose plotline presents some changes in the character's story that differentiate it from the one seen in the anime, such as the fact that she attended Ashford Academy for three days before becoming the Viceroy of Area 11, which consequently leads her to discover that Lelouch and Nunnally are alive. Euphemia also plays a major role in the manga Code Geass: Nightmare of Nunnally, succeeding with the creation of the Special Administrative Zone and gaining the support of the Six Houses of Kyoto. Towards the end of the manga, Euphemia becomes the 99th Empress of the Holy Britannian Empire.

==== Other adaptations ====
In the video game titled Code Geass: Lost Colors, the main protagonist named Rai, an amnesiac young man and the playable character for the players, can be able to use his Geass to prevent the special zone massacre, either overriding her Geass before she goes on the stage or brainwashing the crowd into forgetting what she was about to say and it will create an alternate timeline that prevents Euphemia's death. It is also possible for Rai to romance her, which will allow him and Euphemia to become a couple. In the original video animation titled Code Geass: Nunnally in Wonderland, which adapts both Alice's Adventures in Wonderland and Through the Looking-Glass, Euphemia takes on the role of the White Queen. Shun Mikami played Euphemia in an all-male musical entitled Code Geass: Lelouch of the Rebellion -A Prelude Dedicated to the Sorceror-, which took place in Tokyo from June to July 2012.

== Reception ==
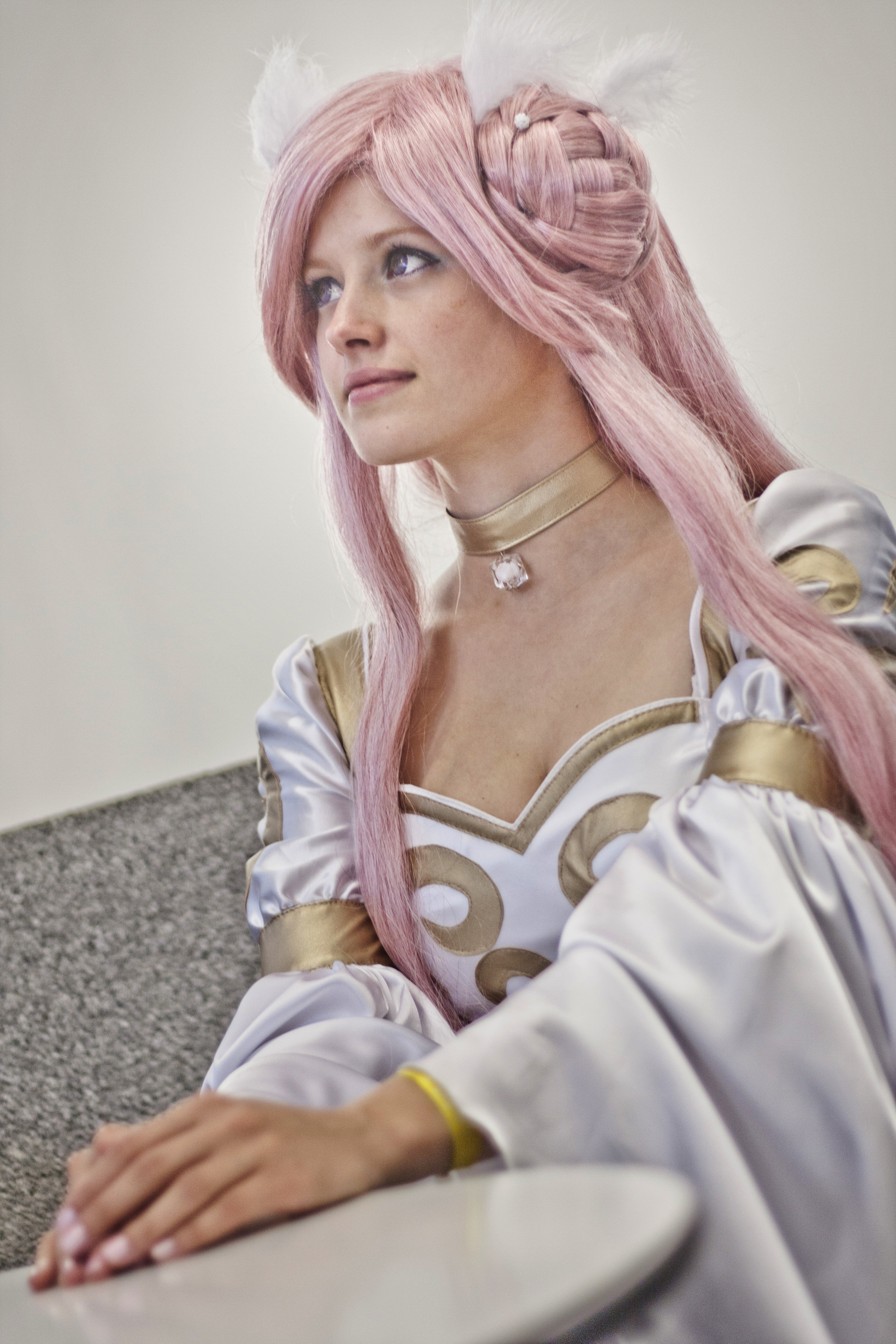
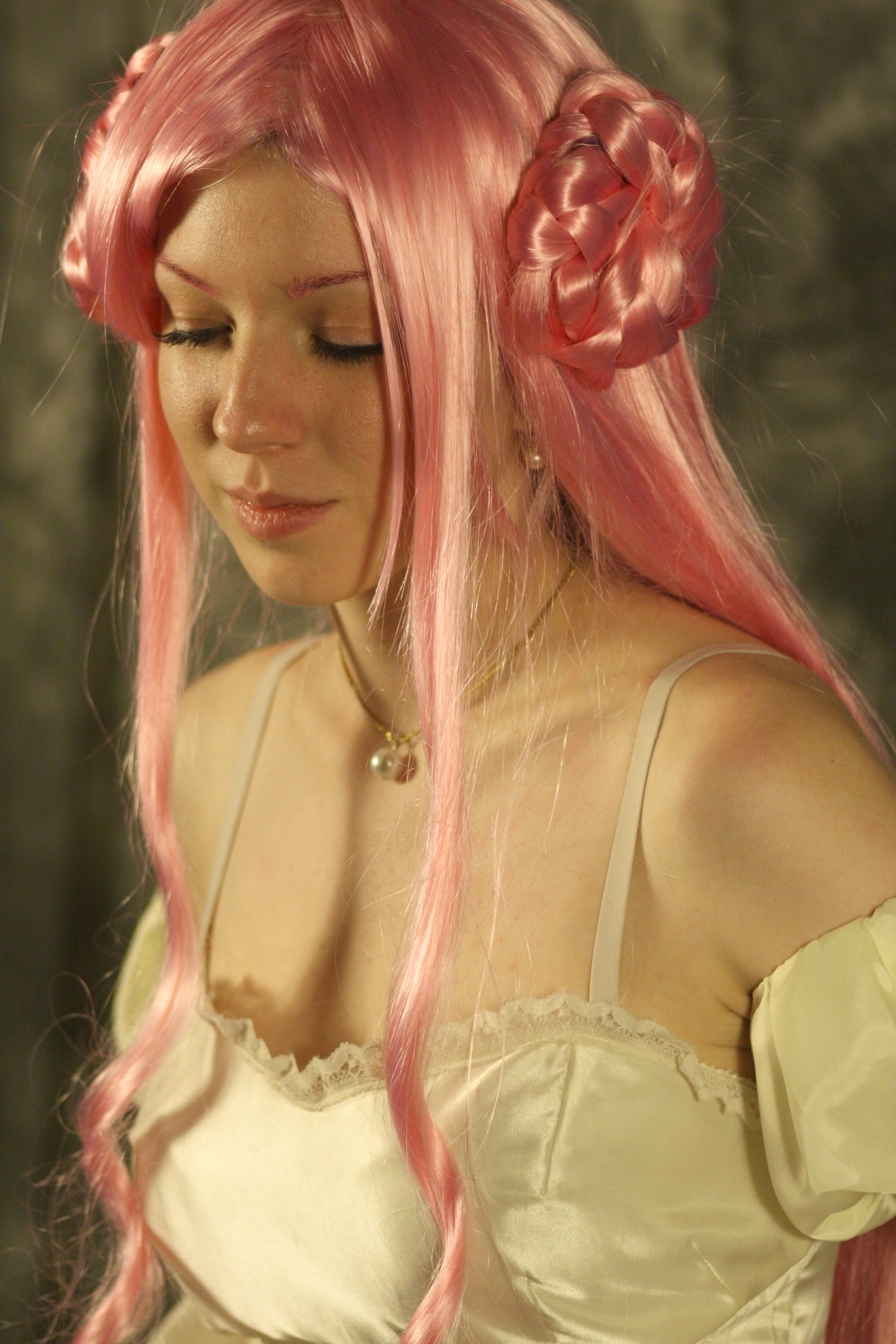
Two female cosplayers, both dressed as Euphemia

=== Popularity ===
Euphemia's popularity has made her a frequent subject of cosplay, causing a trend in which female fans of Code Geass attempt to replicate her iconic look. In August 2012, Euphemia was ranked in 8th place in the Most Tragic Heroine Character poll by Crunchyroll. In October 2016, Euphemia, along with Cornelia, was ranked in 9th place in the Top 10 Cute Anime Sisters by Crunchyroll. In February 2016, Euphemia and Suzaku took 1st place among the 13 Best Anime Couples by IGN.

=== Critical response ===
Devin Nealy of Comic Book Resources (CBR) stated that of all the characters to best Lelouch intellectually, Euphemia is the only one to combat his rigid logic with idealism. Juliana Failde of CBR noted how Euphemia wants nothing but peace and love to spread throughout Japan and that she also wishes to help in making that happen. Still regarding the character, Failde wrote, "She just wanted to see other people succeed in their goals to make the world a better place." Jasmine Venegas of CBR remarked that Euphemia is a gentle soul who believes that there are better ways to solve problems than by fighting. Sean Cubillas of CBR considered Euphemia to be one of the kindest characters in the series.

Patrick Sather of Screen Rant wrote, "[Euphemia] is a strong believer in universal human rights and does not look down on people passed upon their nationality. Euphemia is extremely perceptive and possesses high-level deductive reasoning skills. Her ability to see the big picture speaks to her creativity and intelligence, and a willingness to problem-solve even in the face of insurmountable odds." Ritwik Mitra of Screen Rant praised Euphemia as one of the kindest and most well-meaning characters in the entire series. Ramsey Isler of IGN commented that "[Euphemia]'s death is really the saddest thing in the series so far. She was such a noble character, perhaps the noblest in the series, and she dies with her love Suzaku by her side." Isler also complimented Michelle Ruff's voice acting as Euphemia, saying the actress "does a great job of portraying her child-like innocence, even as she's compelled to commit murder."

== See also ==
- List of Code Geass characters
