= List of Code Geass chapters =

Cover of the first volume of Code Geass: Lelouch of the Rebellion.

The anime television series Code Geass by Sunrise has been adapted by Kadokawa Shoten into five separate manga adaptations, each containing an alternate storyline. The first four of the manga series have been licensed for an English language release in North America by Bandai Entertainment. The first, Code Geass: Lelouch of the Rebellion, by Majiko~! and originally serialized Monthly Asuka, focused on the protagonist of the series, Lelouch Lamperouge, with few differences from the anime's basic storyline. Its chapters were collected in eight tankōbon volumes released from December 26, 2006, to March 26, 2010. Bandai's English adaptation of the series was published from July 29, 2008 to February 15, 2011.

The second manga is Code Geass: Suzaku of the Counterattack (コードギアス 反攻のスザク, Kōdo Giasu: Hankō no Suzaku). It was written by Atsuro Yomino and serialized in Beans A magazine. It focuses on the character Suzaku Kururugi in an alternate reality, where he fights against the criminal organization known as the Black Knights. It was released in two volumes on June 26, 2007, and September 26, 2008. The first English volume was released on January 6, 2009, and the second followed it on October 13, 2009.

The third manga series, Code Geass: Nightmare of Nunnally (コードギアス ナイトメア・オブ・ナナリー, Kōdo Giasu Naitomea Obu Nanarī), serialized in Comp Ace and written by Tomomasa Takuma, focuses on Lelouch's sister, Nunnally Lamperouge who goes into searching her missing brother when her health is restored by an entity named Nemo. It was published in five volumes from June 26, 2007 to April 25, 2009. The English volumes were published from June 9, 2009 to March 23, 2010.

A fourth manga adaptation, Code Geass: Tales of an Alternate Shogunate (幕末異聞録 コードギアス 反逆のルルーシュ, Bakumatsu Ibun Roku Kōdo Giasu Hangyaku no Rurūshu), was serialized in Kerokero Ace as written by Tomomasa Takuma. Set in an alternate 1853, Lelouch is the commander of the Shogunate's military counterinsurgence brigade known as the Shinsengumi, which fights the Black Revolutionaries, a rebel group led by a masked individual known as Rei. It was released in a single volume on October 25, 2010, while the English version will be published on May 10, 2011.

In late 2009, Bandai announced a new project greenlit for 2010. A manga titled Code Geass: Renya of Darkness (コードギアス 漆黒の連夜, Kōdo Giasu: Shikkoku no Renya) by Tomomasa Takuma is the first product announced. The story takes place in the same official Code Geass history as the anime, but in a different era with the anime director Goro Taniguchi is scripting the story. The title character, Renya, is a teenager who encounters the witch C.C. who gives him power to protect his friends. It began publication in the May 2010 issue of Shōnen Ace, with its first volume published on January 26, 2011. Although Bandai had the series licensed by July 2011, they revoked publishing as a result of the company's restructuring.

== Volume list ==
=== Code Geass: Lelouch of the Rebellion ===
No.	Original release date	Original ISBN	English release date	English ISBN
1	December 26, 2006	4-04-854065-3	July 29, 2008	978-1594099731
Geass 1: Tranquility and the Beginning; Geass 2: Midnight Getaway; Geass 3: "Zero"; Afterword
2	June 26, 2007	978-4-04-854098-8	November 18, 2008	978-1594099748
Geass 4: A Brief Break; Geass 5: The Orange Incident; Geass 6: The Cat, The Mask, and Euphemia; Geass 7: The Worst Social Trip; Geass 8: Beyond the Flames; Afterword
3	January 26, 2008	978-4-04-854121-3	March 24, 2009	978-1594099755
Geass 9: Rain; Geass 10: Preparedness; Geass 11: Something Valuable; Geass 12: Co-conspirator; Afterword
4	March 26, 2008	978-4-04-854158-9	July 28, 2009	978-1594099762
Geass 13: The Broken Clock; Geass 14: The Truth Behind the Death; Geass 15: The "Six Houses of Kyoto"; Geass 16: The Black Knights; Geass 17: A Skewed World; Afterword
5	October 26, 2008	978-4-04-854209-8	October 20, 2009	978-1604961591
Geass 18: The Future; Geass 19: The Specially Administrated Zone of Japan; Geass 20: Separation; Geass 21: The Cacophony of Collapse; Bonus: That Voice, That Summer; Afterword
6	April 25, 2009	978-4-04-854312-5	November 18, 2009	978-1604961607
Geass 22: School in the Bird Cage; Geass 23: Place to Stay; Geass 24: Solitude; Geass 25: Tien Zi of the Chinese Federation; Geass 26: Promised Place; Bonus: Bewildered Lelouch; Afterword
7	September 26, 2009	978-4-04-854374-3	January 26, 2010	978-1604962031
Geass 27: Some Day, Maybe; Geass 28: Station; Geass 29: Lies and Promises; Geass 30: United Federation of Nations; Geass 31: Kururugi Shrine; Geass 32: Light of Despair; Afterword
8	March 26, 2010	978-4-04-854442-9	February 15, 2011	978-1604962055
Geass 33: The Betrayal; Geass 34: Lies and Masks; Geass 35: A Kinder World; Geass 36: Emperor; Geass 37: Sky Fortress Damocles; Geass 38: Zero Requiem; Afterword

=== Code Geass: Suzaku of the Counterattack ===
No.	Original release date	Original ISBN	English release date	English ISBN
1	June 26, 2007	978-4-04-854099-5	January 6, 2009	978-1594099779
Phases 1–3
After recovering Lelouch's meeting with C.C. from the original anime, Suzaku is blamed by the Britannians for the murder of Prince Clovis. Lelouch, guised as Zero, rescues him after revealing himself as the culprit. Suzaku returns to the military and becomes a subject to test out the Lancelot suit, a humanoid ex-skelecton which enhances ones physical abilities. Using the suit, he foils a drug operation with assistance from Zero. Later, the Black Knights, without Zero's orders, capture and murder Mariel Lubie's father. Suzaku tells Lelouch he will avenge her father by capturing Zero.
2	September 26, 2008	978-4-04-854230-2	May 5, 2009	978-1594099786
Phases 4–7; Last Phase; Afterword
The Emperor and Second Prince Schneizel arrive in Area 11; impressed with Schneizel's apparent vision for the world, Suzaku agrees to become his knight. When the Black Knights attempt an attack during an art gallery opening attended by the Emperor and Schneizel, Schneizel unmasks and frames Lelouch for the Emperor's death, capturing both Lelouch and C.C. as well. Unable to accept that Lelouch is to be executed, Suzaku frees him after learning from C.C. that Schneizel actually intends to use C.C. to gain immortality and rule the world. Though they manage to stop Schneizel when Suzaku's Geass awakens, Suzaku is caught up in the subsequent explosion to save C.C. and disappears. Five years later, he finally returns home to Lelouch and Nunnally, who have been waiting for him.

=== Code Geass: Nightmare of Nunnally ===
No.	Original release date	Original ISBN	English release date	English ISBN
1	June 26, 2007	978-4-04-713928-2	June 9, 2009	978-1594099793
Code 01. "White Witch"; Code 02. "Black Knightmare"; Code 03. "Evil Instrument, Nemo"; Code 04. "Lake Kawaguchi Incident I –The Phantom of Patriotism–"; Code 05. "Lake Kawaguchi Incident II –Imperial Princess Nunnally–"
Lelouch passes by Shinjuku ghettos on the way home and is caught up in the battle between Britannia and the rebels. He saves C.C. and is seemingly killed by falling debris. When Nunnally travels to the scene to search for her brother, she ends up making a contract with C.C.'s doll, Nemo, granting her the abilities to fuse with the doll in order to create a Knightmare battle suit and defend herself from Britannia. Nemo now lives alongside Nunnally as an apparition and takes on the form of her negative emotions. During a field trip to Lake Kawaguchi, the rebellious Japanese Liberation Front takes control of the hotel where Nunnally and her friends are staying, holding the guests hostage to use them as ransom against Britannia.
2	January 26, 2008	978-4-04-713985-5	October 13, 2009	978-1594099809
Code 06. "Lake Kawaguchi Incident III –Alice the Speed–"; Code 07. "White Knight"; Code 08. "Saitama Incident I –Cornelia's Trap–"; Code 09. "Saitama Incident II –Attack Cornelia–"; Code 10. "Saitama Incident III –Black Demon–"; Afterword
Nunnally fuses with Nemo to become a Knightmare and combats both sides to prevent any deaths. Meanwhile, Zero rescues all the hostages and disposes the rebels. Later, Princess Cornelia plans an assault on Saitama in order to lure out Zero. Nunnally and Nemo intervene the battle, combating both sides, and unknowingly engages her friend, Alice, in battle. Zero defeats Cornelia and Suzaku in their Knightmares and rescues Nunnally and Nemo. Under Zero's mask is revealed to be C.C. who warns Nemo is overestimating her control over Nunnally's feelings. Elsewhere, Lelouch sides with Prince Schneizal to take over Area 11.
3	April 26, 2008	978-4-04-715044-7	December 8, 2009	978-1604961614
Code 11. "Prison of Happiness I –Mao the Refrain–"; Code 12. "Prison of Happiness II –Old Summer Days That Will Never Return–"; Code 13. "Prison of Happiness III –Old Summer Days That Can Never Return–"; Code 14. "Narita Offence and Defence I –The Collapsing Mountain–"; Code 15. "Narita Offence and Defence II –The White Knight and the Black Demon–"
Mao, a defector from the irregulars, a group of humans injected with C.C.'s cells, confronts Nunnally with the purpose of destroying Nemo. She uses her Geass to make Nunnally relive her happiest memory: the time she, her brother, and Suzaku met each other. Mao attempts to destroy Nemo but is stopped by C.C. and killed by Alice. Later, Cornelia and her army invade the Japan Liberation Force's headquarters but are defeated by Zero. When Suzaku is deployed onto the battlefield, he begins experiencing strange visions involving C.C.'s past, which includes how she killed Suzaku's father in order to protect Nunnally and Lelouch. Zero faces Suzaku, revealing himself as Lelouch, and asks Suzaku to join him.
4	October 25, 2008	978-4-04-715103-1	February 2, 2010	978-1604961621
Code 16. "Narita Offence and Defence III –Breach of Contract–"; Code 17. "The Genealogy of the Witch I –Captive Nunnally–"; Code 18. "The Genealogy of the Witch II –Witch Trials–"; Code 19. "The Genealogy of the Witch III –Code Geass–"; Code 20. "Demon King Rolo I –The Empire in Turmoil–"
Alice and Nunnally interrupt Suzaku and Zero's conversation, which results in Nunnally's defeat and capture when she learns Alice's identity. When Nunnally is tried as a witch by Cardinal Rolo vi Britannia, Lelouch's previously unknown twin brother, Suzaku reluctantly teams up with Lelouch to free Nunnally, after being granted the authority to do so by Princess Euphemia. Though Alice is conflicted by the discovery that Nunnally is a Geass user, she accepts Nemo's power in order to save her friend and is given the Knightmare Code Geass to accomplish this. Meanwhile, the Emperor of Britania reforms the country granting him absolute power while Rolo plans to overthrow and become the Emperor himself.
5	April 25, 2009	978-4-04-854209-8	March 23, 2010	978-1604962048
Code 21. "Demon King Rolo II –Cold Pursuit–"; Code 22. "Demon King Rolo III –Artificial Ones–"; Code 23. "Island of Gods I –Emperor vs Emperor–"; Code 24. "Island of Gods II –A Gentle World–"; Code 25. "Island of Gods III –The Zero–"; Last Code. "Demon of Zero"; Afterword
Rolo is defeated by Alice in battle after he attempts to use Nunnally for his goals. Nunnally and Alice then head to a goal and enter Eden Vital, a parallel world containing the consciousness of all human beings. The Emperor and Nunnally's mother beseech her to help them turn all humans into a single collective consciousness. Alice persuades Nunnally to deny their request citing there is no future for humans that way. After acknowledging Nunnally's decision, her parents fade away and become one with Eden Vital. In the aftermath of the war, Euphiemia becomes the empress with the Black Knights assisting her. Lelouch, having gained C.C.'s powers after her death in Eden Vital, leaves to spread the power of Geass throughout the world.

=== Code Geass: Tales of an Alternate Shogunate ===
No.	Original release date	Original ISBN	English release date	English ISBN
1	October 25, 2010	978-4-04-715120-8	July 26, 2011	978-1604962598
1st Story. "Chivalrous Thief Zero Appears!"; 2nd Story. "Lancelot Dances Forth!"; 3rd Story. "Decisive Battle! The Black Restoration Order"; Last Story. "Defeat Perry! The True Opening of Japan to the World"; "Workplace Tour with Kallen"; Message from Takuma Tomomasa; Afterword
Set in an alternate 1853, Lelouch is the commander of the Shogunate's military counterinsurgence brigade known as the Shinsengumi, which fights the Black Revolutionaries (黒の騎士団, Kuro no Kishidan), a rebel group led by a mysterious masked individual known as Rei (零, lit. Zero). Geass is the ability to call upon and summon the armored entities referred to as Knightmares (ナイトメア), of which Lancelot (ランスロット) is one.

=== Code Geass: Renya of Darkness ===
No.	Japanese release date	Japanese ISBN
1	January 26, 2011	978-4047156074
Act I.; Act II.; Act III.; Act IV.; Act V.
2	May 26, 2011	978-4047156975
Act VI.; Act VII.; Act VIII.; Act IX.; Act X.; Act XI.
3	November 23, 2011	978-4041200100
Act XII.; Act XIII.; Act XIV.; Act XV.; Act XVI.; Act XVII.
4	April 25, 2012	978-4041202067
Act XVIII.; Act XIX.; Act XX.; Act XXI.; Act XXII.
5	September 26, 2012	978-4041204085
Act XXIII.; Act XXIV.; Act XXV.; Act XXVI.; Act XXVII.; Act XXVIII.
6	April 25, 2013	978-4041206690
Act XXIX.; Act XXX.; Act XXXI.; Act XXXII.; Act XXXIII.; Act XXXIV.
7	September 26, 2013	978-4041208236
Act XXXV.; Act XXXVI.; Act XXXVII.; Act XXXVIII.; Act XXXIX.; Act XL.

=== Code Geass: OZ the Reflection ===
No.	Japanese release date	Japanese ISBN
1	August 8, 2012	978-4041203637
Mask:00 Prologue; Mask:01 "Glinda Knights"; Mask:02 "Sword of Scarlet"; Mask:03 "Reflection"
2	January 8, 2013	978-4041204856
Mask:04 "Soar Over The Cloudy Capital, Falcon. Part 1"; Mask:05 "Soar Over The Cloudy Capital, Falcon. Part 2"; Mask:06 "Soar Over The Cloudy Capital, Falcon. Part 3"; Side Orpheus
3	July 6, 2013	978-4041206997
Mask:08 "We Aspire To Be Heroes – Prologue"; Mask:09 "We Aspire To Be Heroes – Part 1"; Mask:10 "We Aspire To Be Heroes – Part 2"; Mask:11 "We Aspire To Be Heroes – Part 3"; Mask:12 "Recognition and Foreboding"
4	February 26, 2014	978-4041209806
Mask:13; Mask:14; Mask:15; Mask:16; Mask:17
5	September 26, 2014	978-4041018965
Mask:18; Mask:19; Mask:20; Mask:21; Mask:22; Epilogue

=== Code Geass: OZ the Reflection O2 ===
No.	Japanese release date	Japanese ISBN
1	April 25, 2015	978-4041028667
2	April 25, 2015	978-4041028674
3	January 23, 2016	978-4041037720
4	January 23, 2016	978-4041037737
5	May 24, 2016	978-4041042625

=== Code Black: Lelouch of the Shred Guitar ===
No.	Japanese release date	Japanese ISBN
1	June 5, 2015	978-4-06-377185-5
2	December 4, 2015	978-4-06-377359-0
