= C.C. (Code Geass) =

Fictional character from Code Geass

- Code Geass character
- First appearance: Season 1, Episode 1
- Voiced by: Yukana (Japanese); Kate Higgins (English)

In-universe information
- Nicknames: Immortal Witch; Pizza Girl; Zero's Mistress
- Race: Immortal Human
- Title(s): Witch, C.C.
- Affiliation: Black Knights
- Relatives: Lelouch vi Britannia (husband, Lelouch of the Re;surrection alternate universe only)
- Origin: The monastery since the Middle Ages
- Occupation: Slave (Formerly), Terrorist, Leader of the Geass Order (Formerly), Right-hand woman of Lelouch, Knightmare Pilot
- Position: Second-in-command of the Black Knights
- Allegiance: Geass Order; Lelouch vi Britannia; Black Knights; Holy Britannia Empire
- Knightmare Frame: Gawain (co-pilot); Akatsuki Command Model Zikisan; Lancelot Frontier

C.C. (Japanese: シー・ツー, Hepburn: Shī Tsū, pronounced C2) is the pseudonym of a fictional character in the Code Geass: Lelouch of the Rebellion franchise by Sunrise. With her real name kept from the audience, she first appeared in the 2006 initial anime season, and afterwards has appeared in many manga, OVA, anime, and video game spinoff. She is voiced by Yukana.

Introduced as a captive human test subject of the villainous Holy Britannia Empire, C. C. is revealed to be an immortal young woman with special powers called the Geass. Sardonic, stubborn, and mysterious, she can give Geass powers to others, which she does to main protagonist Lelouch Lamperouge. She becomes an ally and protector of Lelouch, at times piloting a mech and leading the paramilitary group the Black Knights to do so. She later assists Lelouch at destroying other Geass users misusing their powers, including her former students, and supports the regime changes that follow.

In the 2006 Anime Grand Prix, C.C. was awarded third place for most popular female character, then first place in the following two years.

== Development and depiction ==
C.C. (シー・ツー, Shī Tsū) was created as a fictional character for the Code Geass: Lelouch of the Rebellion anime series by Sunrise, who first appeared in 2006 with the premier of the franchise. Her Japanese voice actress is Yukana Nogami, and she is voiced by Kate Higgins in the English dub. C.C. is an immortal witch who appears as a young adult. C.C. is a pseudonym, and her real name is never shared with the audience.

C.C. has long lime green hair and gold eyes. She wears a variety of outfits, which change depending on the time and situation. In the first season she mainly wears a white straitjacket bondage suit, which the Britannian Empire had used to restrain her for tests prior to the series. According to the 2007 Code Geass audio drama, C.C. wears the bondage suit because she feels she isn't free, and is a slave to the world. Her main outfit in the second season is a modified Black Knights uniform, which is long, black, and has a red sash. It has gloves and white undergarments. She has worn Lelouch's own clothes, including his Zero outfit, to serve as a decoy and save him from situations.

C.C. has the power of the "Code", given to her by a nun hundreds of years prior to Code Geass. The Geass power originally allowed her to make anyone around her love her, leading to her being immortal and immune to both age and conventional injury. She has survived being burned at the stake, beheaded by a guillotine, and placed in an iron maiden. When she uses her power, a sigil glows on her body. When left alone, she sometimes appears to talk to herself and have discussions with those who aren't there. This is later revealed to be telepathic communication, Lelouch's deceased mother Marianne being among the recipients. C.C. can also give people the power of Geass or can cancel their Geass, and sense when other people have it. In close proximity, C.C. can give people hallucinations of dark or chaotic images, to lead people into a panic.

She is a competent leader and operations planner, and can fight with mech, with guns, or hand to hand. In the Picture Dramas, during a discussion with Kallen, she states that she has the ability to do almost anything but chooses to let others do it. Calm and collected, she is skilled and pays little attention to inconveniencing others, and at times is withholding information. With a dry sense of humor, she has a nihilistic outlook on the world. Scornful of her immortality, she is lonely and isolated, although she shows fondness for the main protagonist Lelouch Lamperouge.

C.C. has a strong liking for pizza, at times risking the exposure of her identity to obtain it.

== Appearances ==
=== Character background ===
Before C.C. gained the power of Geass, she was a ten-year-old orphaned slave. A nun gave C.C. the power of Geass, allowing C.C. to make anyone love her. When C.C. grew tired of forced love, she looked instead for love from the nun, who was above her power. However, when C.C.'s power had grown, the nun reveals that she had tricked C.C. as a ploy to lose her immortality, and tortured the young woman until C.C. accepted the nun's Code. After C.C. gains immortality, a shock sequence in the first-season finale shows memories of her past, including repeated "deaths" of different types spanning centuries. Alive for hundreds of years, she speaks to Lelouch of Washington's Rebellion, referring to George Washington and Benjamin Franklin as if she had been close with both. She claims to have entered into magical Geass contracts with hundreds of people over her lifetime, in futile attempts to lose her immortality.

One of her previous contracts was with the late Imperial Consort Marianne, the mother of the lead protagonist of Code Geass, Lelouch Lamperouge. After C.C. aided Marianne and Marianne's husband Charles zi Britannia achieve their goals, C.C. was named head of the Geass Order, a secret organization that studies and produces Geass users. However, she left the order upon news of Marianne's death, and let V.V. take over. Years later she is captured by a Britannian envoy in Japan, which takes an interest in her immortality and intends to bring her to the Imperial city of Pendragon in North America.

=== Code Geass: Lelouch of the Rebellion ===
Early in the series, Osaka is bombed and a "top-security asset of the Britannian government," or C.C., is stolen by terrorists hiding in the Shinjuku Ghetto. As a result, the Viceroy orders Shinjuku wiped out, and during the violence, C.C. and Lelouch encounter one another. At their meeting, C.C. gives Lelouch the power of Geass, and he attempts to help her escape the soldiers. Since she is shot in the incident and appears dead, he leaves her body behind.

In episode five, she unexpectedly appears again in Lelouch's home at Ashford Academy. Lelouch encounters her casually folding origami with his sister Nunnally. Afterwards, she keeps an eye on Lelouch's missions as his rebel alter-ego Zero, even wearing his clothes and impersonating him when a situation becomes life-threatening. She then joins his military mech organization the Black Knights, where she is seen as one of Zero's close advisors. Her unofficial position leads to some friction with other members.

When the Black Knights gain possession of the Knightmare Frame Gawain, she becomes its pilot while Lelouch operates the weapons. In the season finale, she uses the Gawain to battle Jeremiah Gottwald's Siegfried, to allow Lelouch to save his sister. After kissing Lelouch, she drags herself and the enemy to the ocean floor.

=== Code Geass: Lelouch of the Rebellion R2 ===
C.C. is in charge of the Black Knights at the start of the second season, where she and the others plan an operation to free Lelouch's memories from the Emperor of Britannia. After he is rescued, she again becomes his advisor. After the location of the Geass Directorate is located, Lelouch orders C.C. to attack the facility, and she reluctantly kills her former colleagues at the Geass Order.

After Lelouch and C.C. enter the mystical Sword of Akasha spirit realm, she reveals to him that her greatest wish is to die by giving up her Code. Since Lelouch is not ready to accept it, she intends to offer it to his father, Emperor Charles. Lelouch attempts to stop her and save her, and in doing so, her memories of everything after the day she acquired her Geass are lost, reverting her to a frightened slave girl. Believing himself to be responsible, Lelouch confines C.C. to his quarters and attempts to make her comfortable. Later, the spirit of Lelouch's mother, Marianne, possesses the body of Anya Alstreim and locates C.C. to restore her memories. The two then leave for Kamine Island to re-enter the Sword of Akasha, rescuing Suzaku Kururugi along the way. They enter the Sword of Akasha, where C.C.'s presence allows the Emperor to begin the Ragnarök Connection and merge everyone into the collective unconscious. When Lelouch kills Charles and Marianne before the connection can be completed, C.C. is spared because she had turned against their plan. A month later, she helps Lelouch seize the throne as the new Emperor of Britannia.

Near the end of the series, C.C. and Lelouch bond and comfort one another, before being interrupted when Lelouch is attacked by his former Black Knights allies. C.C. intervenes in her Lancelot so he can escape, and battles her former Black Knight co-pilot Kallen Stadtfeld. C.C. ejects to safety when she is easily defeated. Later, as Lelouch plans to execute the captured Black Knights, C.C. prays for Lelouch in a church during his planned assassination. During the epilogue, C.C. is seen traveling the countryside in the back of a cart. She reminisces about how Lelouch proved the Geass does not bring loneliness and expresses her feelings for him.

=== Code Geass Lelouch of the Re;surrection ===
In the events of the alternate universe of the 2019 film Code Geass Lelouch of the Re;surrection, which is built around the "what if" of C.C. not being able to accept Lelouch's death, and which takes place a year after the events of the alternate universe trilogy movies, C.C is revealed to have literally resurrected Lelouch from the dead after Shirley smuggled his corpse to her, and that she has been looking after Lelouch since his soul did not return after his physical resurrection. C.C. manages to fully restore Lelouch once they find a portal to C's World while helping save Nunnally and Suzaku from the Zilkhistans. In the aftermath, C.C. continues to travel the world with Lelouch after he assumes the alias of L.L., which was his idea of a marriage proposal.

=== Other film and television ===
In a special 2012 OVA parody episode Nunnally in Wonderland, based on the Alice in Wonderland story, C.C. appears in the role as a Cheshire Cat. In the 2012 to 2016 Code Geass: Akito the Exiled spinoff of the television series, C.C. again appears. In March 2017, the media wrote that Kate Higgins would be reprising her role as the voice of C.C. in the dub of Code Geass: Akito the Exiled, to be released by Sunrise on June 27, 2017.

=== Manga and graphic novels ===
In the 2006-2010 Code Geass manga, C.C. appears in the plot a number of times. In the manga spin-off series Nightmare of Nunnally in 2007 and 2008, C.C. assists Lelouch and Nunnally Lamperouge in a political maneuver. This spin-off series sees the reveal that C.C. was known as the "Witch of Britannia" and was the rival and foe of Joan of Arc, known as the "Witch of Orleans", during the Hundred Years' War. In Chapter 13, it is revealed that in this timeline, C.C. was the killer of former Japanese Prime Minister Genbu Kururugi, not Suzaku Kururugi.

In the graphic novel Code Geass: Suzaku of the Counterattack released in 2009 with a different plot, C.C.'s role is nearly identical to that of the anime. C.C. appears again in the 2011 graphic novel Code Geass: Renya of Darkness. She interacts with the protagonist Renya, a young ninja training in Edo Japan. She offers Renya a contract so he can use the Geass to protect his friends.

=== Video games ===
In Code Geass: Lost Colors, a video game for the PlayStation 2 and PlayStation Portable released in 2008, C.C. periodically interacts with the main character Rai. C.C. eats pizza in Rai's room, and later offers for Rai to join the Black Knights, with player response leading to different outcomes.

C.C. appears in the 2010 video game Another Century's Episode: R in her Knightmare Frame, Akatsuki Command Model C.C. Custom.

C.C. and the rest of the Code Geass R1 cast will make their debut to the Super Robot Wars franchise in Super Robot Wars Z 2 Hakai-Hen, using their R1 Knightmares.

== Critical reception ==
After she placed in third as the most popular female character in Animage magazine's 29th Anime Grand Prix, she won first place the following two years, in 2007 and 2008 (see list of Anime Grand Prix winners). In 2016, Takahiro Kimura created an erotic sketch of the character which would be sold through an auction.

In regards to her role in Lelouch of the Re;surrection, Anime News Network noted the narrative focused more on C.C.. The Fandom Post commented the ending with C.C and Lelouch too abrupt despite feeling appropriate at the same time.
