= Kallen Stadtfeld =

Fictional character from Code Geass

Kallen Kozuki
- Code Geass character
- Kallen Kozuki
- First appearance: Season 1, Episode 1
- Voiced by: Ami Koshimizu (Japanese); Karen Strassman (English)

In-universe information
- Aliases: Kallen Stadtfeld; Q-1 (given by Zero)
- Relatives: Mother (Japanese); Naoto Kozuki (brother, deceased)
- Nationality: Britannian-Japanese
- Allegiance: Black Knights
- Position: Captain of Squad Zero
- Knightmare Frame: Glasgow; Burai; Guren Mk-II

Kallen Stadtfeld (Japanese: カレン・シュタットフェルト, Hepburn: Karen Shutattoferuto) is a fictional character in the Sunrise anime series Code Geass: Lelouch of the Rebellion. In the series, she is legally known as "Kallen Stadtfeld" at school, but prefers to be called by her original birth name and mother's surname, using Kallen Kozuki (紅月カレン, Kōzuki Karen) during her revolutionary activities and life after the series concludes. Her Japanese voice actress Ami Koshimizu won "Best Actress in a Supporting Role" for her role as Kallen at the first Seiyu Awards in 2007. Kallen was awarded 8th place in the 29th Anime Grand Prix, then 17th and 16th, respectively, in the following two.

== Character outline ==
Frail and meek, this aspect of Kallen's character was used as a public front to mask her true nature as a combatant deeply involved in the resistance.

Kallen is half Japanese and half Britannian, but believes herself to be Japanese at heart due to being born and raised in Japan by her mother. She prefers to be known by the name "Kozuki", her mother's maiden name and her original birth name. Her father is a Britannian and her mother is an Eleven; her father comes from a prestigious Britannian family, from which Kallen benefited after she was officially acknowledged as his heir after the invasion of Japan. Due to her parents never marrying she was considered illegitimate before this point, and spent years treated as and living as an Eleven before her father claimed her as his own during her middle school years (approximately 1–2 years before the start of Code Geass R1). Because of this she bears no personal attachment to the "Stadtfeld" name, seeing it as a fake identity; in Japanese credits and apocrypha she is exclusively titled as "Kallen Kozuki" as a result. She attends Ashford Academy, where she later becomes a member of its student council and is one of its most outstanding students. Her brother, Naoto Kozuki (紅月ナオト, Kōzuki Naoto), with whom she had a deep connection, was a former leader of her resistance cell before his death.

Both Kallen's stepmother, a Britannian, and biological mother live with her in the same house, but her biological mother is employed as a maid and is often mistreated by both her stepmother and Kallen herself. After her biological mother is arrested for using Refrain (a fictional drug which lets people think they're reliving the past), Kallen changes her views and decides to fight against the Britannian Empire not only for her brother, but to fulfill her new wish for a world in which she can live happily with her biological mother.

Kallen leads a double life as both a normal Britannian student and as a member of a guerrilla resistance group against Britannia, which is later reformed into the Order of the Black Knights by Lelouch Vi Britannia. In school, she portrays herself as a feeble-bodied high school student careful to follow every formality and goes by her Britannian name of Stadtfeld. However, her personality becomes very forceful and strong-willed when she acts as a resistance fighter.

As a running gag, Kallen ends up nude or immodestly dressed in front of other people on numerous occasions: Lelouch sees her naked after she accidentally pulls back a shower curtain in the third episode, Suzaku sees her bathing under a waterfall when they are stranded on Kamine Island, she is forced to dress in an immodest bunny costume at the start of the second season (to plant a tracking device on Lelouch), and she walks in on a meeting between C.C. and the Chinese ambassadors wearing only a towel when intending to complain about the previous situation to C.C. (claiming that the operation would've gone faster if C.C. was wearing the outfit).

In an interview reported by the anime magazine Newtype USA, seiyu Ami Koshimizu talked about the difficulty of voicing Kallen because of the double life that her character leads. Certain aspects of Kallen's character such as her girlish naivete and competitiveness made it easy for the voice actress to relate, even to the point of admitting that in some ways they act very much the same.

== Character history ==
=== First season ===
Kallen appears early in the first episode, driving a truck carrying C.C.'s capsule, and then providing cover by fighting Jeremiah in a Glasgow. After Lelouch gains his Geass from C.C., he takes control of an enemy Sutherland and helps Kallen to escape the other Knightmare Frames chasing her. He further directs the remaining resistance forces in the battle, granting them a decisive advantage until Suzaku Kururugi uses the Lancelot's superior systems to overwhelm their forces. She sacrifices her own machine to allow Lelouch to escape, despite not knowing who he really is.

After this incident, Lelouch's unfamiliarity with his Geass causes him to reveal knowledge of the Shinjuku incident to Kallen while questioning her about her motivations, leading her to suspect him of being their unknown benefactor. Lelouch disproves these suspicions by being present while she receives a telephone call from Zero, which actually plays a message he recorded. With the formation of the Black Knights and Zero's increasing number of victories over the Britannian forces, Kallen comes to greatly admire him, evident in her ecstatic reaction to her appointment as head of his personal guard. She even tries to assassinate Suzaku Kururugi after learning that he is the pilot of the Lancelot, believing it would benefit Zero's goal. The trust seems to be mutual, as Lelouch offers to reveal his identity to her when he notices her curiosity; she declines, though she shows signs of jealousy that C.C., whom she had first met in the previous episode, appears to know.

The Guren Mk-II

Once the Black Knights begin receiving new Knightmares, Zero gives Kallen the newly developed Guren Mk-II. With its powerful radiation-emitting arm and speed matching Suzaku's Lancelot, Kallen becomes one of the Black Knights' most talented pilots, often facing off against Suzaku and usually proving an even match for him.

At the end of the first season, Kallen reveals her identity to the students of Ashford Academy when the Black Knights occupy it as their base of operations, convincing the student council that they will not be harmed. Later on, she battles against Suzaku in his flight-equipped Lancelot, suffering a narrow defeat. Lelouch intervenes before Suzaku can deliver the finishing blow. When Lelouch abandons the battle to rescue his sister, Kallen follows him. She witnesses his confrontation with Suzaku and learns about his true identity, the truth about the massacre of SAZ, and his Geass power. She flees in shock rather than helping Lelouch to deal with Suzaku, and goes into hiding. In Oz the Reflection, she briefly helps Orpheus Zevon in battle before rejoining the Black Knights.

=== Second season (R2) ===
One year later, Kallen is still part of the Black Knights. Along with C.C., she is the only member who knows Lelouch's identity and secret power, having been brought up to speed by C.C. in the interim. Kallen confronts Lelouch about whether or not he used Geass to make her loyal to him, and Lelouch insists that her loyalty is her own decision. She seems to accept this, and still supports Zero, even though she prefers to see Lelouch and Zero as separate entities; however, she later starts seeing them as the same person. Over time Kallen grows to love Lelouch, offering to die for him. She also desires to be in his inner circle as C.C. is, so that she won't be left in the dark about his plans; though she won't admit it, C.C. easily sees through the act and playfully teases her about it, with Kallen unaware that Lelouch is slowly returning her feelings.

During the operation to kidnap Nunnally vi Britannia as she is being transported to Area 11, Kallen receives an upgrade for the Guren Mk-II, giving it flight capabilities and an upgraded radiation arm. With it she is able to destroy Gilbert G.P. Guilford's Vincent and the remaining two Glaston Knights flanking him, then incapacitate Gino and Anya's Knightmare Frames with a wide-range burst. Her battle with Suzaku is cut short when the airship carrying Nunnally crashes into the sea.

After this incident, Lelouch becomes depressed over Nunnally's involvement, since he can't bring himself to go against her wishes. When he nearly resorts to taking Refrain, Kallen steps in and talks him out of it, promising to do anything he asks her to. He tries to kiss her, requesting her to comfort him as a woman, but despite her feelings for him she backs out at the last moment and slaps him, insisting that he bears the responsibility for realizing the dream he gave the Japanese people. After Lelouch regains his composure and tricks the Britannians into exiling the Black Knights, she shows a great deal of relief knowing that he's feeling better. While she is daydreaming about this, Lelouch snaps her back to reality, causing her to fall on him. As she tries to cherish the moment by asking him why he came back, he counter-asks her if she will return to Ashford with him when Britannia is defeated, only to be interrupted by C.C.

During the Black Knights attempted kidnapping of Empress Tianzi, Kallen is captured by Li Xingke in his Shen Hu, having taken her Guren into battle without replacing its energy filler. After the High Eunuchs turn to Schneizel el Britannia for military support, she is turned over to Suzaku along with the Guren. She is sent back to a prison in Area 11, and subsequently transferred into a more comfortable solitary cell by Nunnally, who also gives her a dress to wear. Suzaku approaches her after Shirley's death, intending to use the Refrain drug to find out if Lelouch has become Zero once again, but cannot bring himself to do it because he refuses to stoop to Lelouch's level. In retaliation, she beats him severely during their next meeting when Suzaku tries to apologize.

The Guren S.E.I.T.E.N. Eight Elements-Type

During the second battle of Tokyo, Kallen is rescued from captivity and returns to the Guren (complete with a pilot suit brought by Sayoko), which had been radically upgraded by Lloyd Asplund and Cécile Croomy during her imprisonment. Using the new Guren, she annihilates the Britannian forces. Luciano Bradley and the Valkyrie squadron are killed, as are an untold number of support units. She then fights Suzaku, easily breaking through his defenses and bringing him to the brink of death. In doing so, however, she activates his Geass command, forcing him to survive by firing the F.L.E.I.J.A. bomb. She dodges it and the bomb hits the government building, destroying a fair portion of the Tokyo Settlement.

After Kallen returns to the Black Knights, she learns of C.C.'s memory loss and realizes that Lelouch is alone. When Zero's identity is revealed, she tries to defend him. The others won't listen, suspecting that Lelouch is controlling her. She asks Lelouch what she means to him, expressing a willingness to die with him. Seeing no way out, Lelouch mocks the Black Knights for taking so long to realize the truth, then calls Kallen a pawn. As Kallen walks away feeling betrayed, he whispers "Kallen, you must live on" within earshot. She unsuccessfully tries to get the Black Knights to wait after their first attempt to kill Zero fails thanks to Rolo Lamperouge, and is left standing on the hangar floor when Rolo uses his Geass to escape with Lelouch. After Lelouch's escape, Kallen tries to protest how Ohgi and the others have discarded Zero so readily despite all that he has done for them, but they refuse to listen, still angered at the idea that they were merely being used as pawns. When Lelouch is crowned Emperor, Kallen and the rest of the Black Knights are visibly stunned.

Following Lelouch's declaration that Britannia will join the U.F.N., Kallen escorts him to the meeting, giving orders to the Black Knights beforehand to gun her down if she appears to be under the influence of Geass. Lelouch gets her to take the long route, giving them the chance to speak in private. Kallen recounts their history, and then asks Lelouch what he intends to gain by becoming Emperor, as well as what she means to him. Lelouch remains silent, so she kisses him. When he still doesn't respond, she bids him farewell; he does the same once she can no longer hear him.

When Lelouch takes the U.F.N. leaders hostage, Kallen insists that she'll take Lelouch down personally, as she possesses the only Knightmare capable of fighting Suzaku's Lancelot Albion. However, Xingke orders her not to fight, fearing for the safety of the hostages. After the Black Knights side with Schneizel, Kallen is stationed in the front lines. She breaks away from the main line to try to reach Lelouch, but is called back. Kallen breaks into the Avalon and attempts to kill Lelouch, with tears in her eyes as she does so, but is stopped by C.C. Kallen defeats C.C. and, with the help of Gino, proceeds to the Damocles for a final confrontation with Suzaku.

After a fierce battle, Kallen manages to land a decisive blow on the Lancelot; however, this is at the cost of having her Guren completely disabled in the process and losing consciousness. While the Lancelot explodes, she falls from the floating fortress to what would have been her death had it not been for Gino's rescue. After the battle, she is taken along with many others who rebelled against Lelouch to execution, and then witnesses Lelouch's death by Suzaku disguised as Zero. She immediately understands what Lelouch has done, and stoutly proclaims that it is the real Zero with tears in her eyes.

In the two months following Lelouch's death, Kallen has forgiven Lelouch since she realized his intention—to sacrifice himself and through it to expunge the hatred of the world. She narrates about the changed world he created. She is shown living with her mother in the city. She still attends Ashford Academy and is one of the members of Rivalz's new Student Council, but has thrown away her frail cover, signified by her going to school with her preferred hairstyle and the Guren's key around her neck. She keeps several photos of her friends in her room and smiles at the one with Lelouch before eating a piece of French toast, waving goodbye to her mother before hurrying to school.

Kallen's character poem in the Code Geass DVD reveals that she had fallen in love with Lelouch through her devotion to him and that if he had ever told her that he loved her again, she would've "followed him to hell". Knowing that she would do precisely that was the reason Lelouch remained silent, as had they consummated their feelings, she would have found out about the Zero Requiem, subsequently trying to talk him out of it and, if that didn't work, commit suicide, he wanted Kallen to live on. She then declares that it wasn't just because of that she fell in love with him, but also due to the noble actions she had always supported and revealed to her by Nunnally. Four months later, she is present for Lelouch's miracle over the Student Council, where he asks her to never give up on them and thanking her for staying in school; when he departs, she grimaces over the fact she will never stop loving him.

== Abilities ==
Kallen is a highly skilled Knightmare Frame pilot, rivaling the abilities of even the Knights of the Round. She is acknowledged as the best pilot of the Black Knights by enemies and allies alike. Her codename, "Q-1", is the Queen's starting spot in descriptive chess notation. In Lelouch's assessment of the core members of the Black Knights, her "Combat Ability" score is 100 out of 100, matching that of Kyoshiro Tohdoh; she also has the highest possible "Loyalty" score of one hundred.

Even when piloting outdated Knightmare Frames such as the Glasgow, Kallen proves to be a dangerous opponent easily defeating numerous Sutherlands, despite the Sutherland being a more advanced Knightmare. With the radiation arm of her Guren Mk-II, Kallen can take down almost any Knightmare Frame in a single attack should they allow her to make physical contact, and later models also have numerous secondary attack modes for mid- and long-range combat. Her Knightmare Frame is also incredibly fast, allowing her to fight on the same level as some of the most advanced Knightmare Frames in the series.

Outside of a Knightmare, Kallen displays superior fighting abilities. She is nimble enough to swat a bee with a single swipe (and cut it in thirds), and on two occasions she defeats numerous armed men with little trouble. She is also apparently intelligent, since her grades in school are top of the class despite frequent absences.

== Appearances in other media ==
=== Lost Colors ===
In the video game spin-off Code Geass: Lost Colors, Kallen was one of the characters Rai meets, along with the other student council members, and greeted him after he wakes up. If the player chooses either Black Knight route or Blue Moon route, Rai becomes Kallen's love interest as their relationship developed and attempts to be close to him, while the player interacts more with Kallen if the player progresses a relationship with her in the Blue Moon route.

At day one to five, Kallen arrived at the school and meets Rai at the courtyard, leading the two to have a friendly interaction with each other.

In one scene, Kallen asks to meet Rai in a hot spring. The rest of the student council comes in while they are talking, resulting in Kallen trying to explain the misunderstanding. Kallen eventually walks out.

==== Blue Moon Route ====
In the Blue Moon Route, Rai received a blue colored letter and follows the letters instructions to go a place, leading him to a church and finds Kallen there. Kallen confesses her love to him but fears that it won't work out for them and Rai reassuring her that it would. The next scene shows the two of them are dating and now a couple. Kallen makes Rai a lunchbox saying how he always works hard and tells him he should eat as much as possible.

==== Black Knight Route ====
In her first day, since Rai's arrival at Ashford Academy, Kallen arrived at Rai's place to lead him to the student council room by Milly. There she later suggested to go to different places that would trigger his memory, leading Milly to vote for Kallen as Rai's caretaker, which Shirley and Nina agrees. If the player chooses to have Kallen as her caretaker, Kallen herself becomes doubtful. If the player chooses not to have Kallen as her caretaker, Kallen sees him having doubt and decides to accept the role of his caretaker.

When the student council members notice Rai being lively, they suspect Kallen may have influence him as they've been seen together lately and suspected having a relationship with him, which Kallen denied and ask Rai to clear up the misunderstanding. If the player choose to confirm Kallen's words, she becomes satisfied and the student council members sees them on good terms. If the player choose to confirm the student council's word, Kallen becomes shocked and embarrassed and the student council members becomes surprised and cheerful. After the two left, they decided to go to Shinjuku Ghetto, to search for a clue on Rai's identity.

While searching through the ghetto, Kallen notice Rai recognizing a building and suspect Rai was Japanese, then notice Kallen's face brightened up. If the player chooses to say if she laughed at him, Kallen denies it and decides to look around more. If the player choose to say if she's happy, Kallen replied that he had remembered something since she's been keeping him company, which Rai thanked her. Later, the two are caught in a battle by a group of Anti-Britannian terrorists with Burai Kightmare Frames pretending to be the Black Knights and a group of Britannian Sutherlands and Knight Police Frames. As they try to escape, they see a Burai falling onto them. If the player chooses to Protect Kallen, Rai immediately grabs Kallen in between his arms and turned his back towards the Burai. If the player chooses to thrust Kallen away, Rai lied face down on the ground, knocking Kallen to the ground as well. The two later went in the damaged Burai, with Rai piloting it visually as the hatch can't close while Kallen wrapped around his body and tried to escape, but later encountered a Sutherland who was targeting the Burai and started to attack. However Rai managed to defeat him easily, which led Kallen to become surprised and impressed. They later encountered the real Black Knights defeating both the terrorists and the Britannian army while they were helping the civilians escape, leading Kallen to have them recognize her and let them leave.

The next day in Ashford Academy, Kallen meets Rai in the courtyard and request she would talk to him in the rooftops involving the battle at Shinjuku. Kallen then asked Rai how he knew to easily pilot a Knightmare, which he replied that he just knew. If the player choose to say if he was a Britannian who was in the army before, Kallen thinks of it as a possibility. If the player choose to say what Kallen thinks, she replied the possibility of Rai being a soldier of a Japanese resistance cell, which Rai thinks of himself as a dangerous person, but Kallen comments that he should be happy about the clues of his identity increased. During lunch break after their discussion, both Kallen and Rai went to the cafeteria together, which cause the attention to the other students there, which both don't know why. Later Rivalz appeared with Lelouch and has teased them for the two being a couple after a rumor mentioning her relationship with Rai went well and the incident involving the two in the Shinjuku ghetto, which includes Rai protecting Kallen. The rumor has shocked Kallen and Rai, with Lelouch thanked Rai for his deed and Rivalz curious to know what. Although Kallen had confirmed that Rai had saved her, she was annoyed by Rivalz's constant bickering, which led to Lelouch convincing him not to bother her more.

Kallen later went to the Black Knight's hideout and meets with Zero to report about what happened in Shinjuku ghetto and revealed to him about Rai and his piloting skills. This report got Zero interested and was recommended by Kallen that he would join the Black Knights. The next day, Kallen waited for Rai from his chess match with Lelouch and sent him a signal to follow her, which the player will choose to follow her right away, or follow her after a little while, and meet Kallen in the School garden, who then given him an invitation to meet her.

The next day, Kallen waited for Rai at the Ghetto Ruins, witnessed his arrival and revealed her true self to him, which slightly surprised Rai. Kallen then led Rai to a tunnel and requested him to join her to fight against Britannia, believing him to be Japanese, which has confused Rai. The two arrived at an Abandoned Building and Kallen introduces him to Zero and revealed herself as Kallen Kouzuki, a member of the Black Knights. Kallen also requested Rai to join them, and requested to Zero for his admission, which Zero let Rai to decide, but noted they will take measures to protect their secret. If the player chooses to have no choice or accepts to join, Kallen becomes pleased. However, if the player chooses that he is unsure, Kallen becomes shocked when Zero noted his silence mean he refused and prepares to open fire, but Kallen shielded Rai and begged him to join and revealed to him the Black Knights have an intelligence network to discover clues involving his past, leading Rai to have no choice but to join the Black Knights, but comments he will only trust Kallen.

In the Black Knights Route, Rai stops Princess Euphemia from following through with Lelouch's accidental Geass command (an alternate version to episode 22–23), which he was shot in the process. After Rai woke up and was healed, Kallen shows a great deal of gratitude toward Rai for saving the Japanese and shead in tears as Rai is alive and the two embrace each other as they kiss. Afterwards Rai and Kallen continue to be faithful members of the Black Knights.

==== Geass Route ====
In the Geass Route ending, Kallen was in the hangar tuning her Guren and was approached by Rai who wanted to talk to her. When Rai revealed that he's leaving the Black Knights, Kallen was shocked and demanded a reason from him. This led to Rai telling her that he has an illness and doesn't know how long he has left. After hearing this, Kallen ordered him to cure his illness and return. After Rai had left the hangar, Kallen turned to her Guren and slammed her fist in anger and sadness.

=== Code Geass (manga) ===
The manga differs from the real series focusing on the Black Knights activities; in the manga Kallen is not present during C.C's appearance. Lelouch's first meeting with her is also different as she bumps into him at school.

Kallen protests at the school rather than at the settlement. She is also apparently Zero's only soldier as only she helps him, such as when they rescue Suzaku.

=== Nightmare of Nunnally ===
In the manga spin-off series Nightmare of Nunnally, Kallen and the other Resistance members took advantage of the arrival of Nunnally's Mark Nemo Knightmare Frame to make their escape from Britannian forces pursuing them.

When Kallen escapes from the rooftops after she was taken hostage with the other student council members in a hotel at Lake Kawaguchi, she witnesses the arrival of the Mark Nemo. She later met up with Zero, who gave her a suitcase with the Black Knights uniform.

In the battle against Cornelia's forces in the Saitama ghetto, she met up with the Mark Nemo again and witness it destroying all of the Britannian forces, and thought it was on their side, but disagrees and starts to attack Kallen and her group. She was surprised that it knew her moves before it happened and was defeated.

=== Suzaku of the Counterattack ===
In the manga spin-off Suzaku of the Counterattack, Kallen becomes a member of the Black Knight after Zero forms the organization, but has doubts about his methods after a Black Knights faction had gone renegade and orchestrated an attack, taking the lives of nearby civilians, including Lenard Lubie.

When Zero is planning to attack the Britannian Art Gallery with the goal of assassinating the Emperor who has arrived there, Kallen confronted him about whether it would be a trap and also commented that she would still follow him. Admiring her answer and loyalty, Lelouch placed a geass command on her that if anything would happen to him then she would lead the Black Knights. When the Black Knights took the Art Gallery hostage, she is confronted by Suzaku and was surprised that she's not only a member but a half Britannian-Japanese right after he left to stop Zero from killing the Emperor. After Lelouch was captured and accused for killing the Emperor, Kallen assume leadership of the Black Knights as the new Zero and later led the remaining Black Knight members to begin an assault on the Governor Building of Area 11, unaware that Lelouch is freed by Suzaku and are both planning to stop Schneizel.

Five years later, a 22-year-old Kallen is seen walking on the street and still a member of the Black Knights and in contact, but while she was passing by, she suddenly saw someone who resembles a 17-year-old Suzaku, which she thinks she's imagine it.

=== Another Century's Episode: R ===
Kallen makes an appearance in the Another Century's Episode: R video game in her Knightmare Frame, the Guren Mk-II in an alternative event of R2.

Kallen appeared in her world, in an alternative event of episode 6 of the second season, on a mission in her Guren Nishki to destroy a group of Caerleon battle ships until a group of Sutherland Knightmares appears. Kallen manages to defeat them all, but her Guren's radiation surge wave arm was badly damaged, but also fell when the ship began to shake, which led Rakshata to send her unit to transform her Guren Nishki to the Guren Kashōshiki. She later proceeds to destroy the other Caerleon along with Todoh in his Zangetsu Knightmare and encountered Suzaku in his Lancelot along with Gino in his Tristan and Anya in her Mordred. Kallen had fought the three and defeated them, causing Suzaku to order a retreat to the Chinese Federation.

After Zero kidnaps Empress Tianzi, Kallen fought against Xingke in his Knightmare Frame, Shen Hu, while defending the Ikaruga flagship from being attacked by a group of Gun Ru's. After the Enuches plans were exposed to the media, Kallen, along with Zero, C.C., and Xingke, have worked together and attack the Enuches land fortress, Leung Tan, leading them to their deaths while the fortress explode. After being confronted by a fleet of Britannian Knightmares, including the four Rounds, the group encountered an unknown Black Hole and Kallen was sucked in along with Zero and C.C.

=== Super Robot Wars Z 2 Hakai-Hen ===
Kallen and the rest of the Code Geass R1 cast will make their debut to the Super Robot Wars franchise in this game, using their R1 Knightmares.

=== Nunnally in Wonderland ===
In a special OVA parody episode, based on the Alice in Wonderland story, Kallen appears in the role as the March Hare.
