= Nunnally Lamperouge =

Fictional character from Code Geass

Nunnally vi Britannia
- Code Geass character
- First appearance: Season 1, Episode 1
- Voiced by: Kaori Nazuka (Japanese); Rebecca Forstadt (English)

In-universe information
- Aliases: Nunnally Lamperouge; White Witch
- Nickname: Nana
- Title(s): Princess of Britannia; Viceroy of Area 11; 100th Empress of Britannia
- Relatives: Charles zi Britannia (father, deceased); Marianne vi Britannia (mother, deceased); Lelouch vi Britannia (older brother); C.C. (sister-in-law, "Lelouch of the Resurrection" alternate universe only); See Britannian Imperial Family
- Nationality: Britannian
- Knightmare Frame: Mark Nemo (Nightmare of Nunnally manga only)

Nunnally Lamperouge (Japanese: ナナリー・ランペルージ, Hepburn: Nanarī Ranperūji) is a fictional character in the Sunrise anime series, Code Geass: Lelouch of the Rebellion. She is Lelouch Lamperouge's disabled younger sister. Her real name is Nunnally vi Britannia (ナナリー・ヴィ・ブリタニア, Nanarī Vi Buritania). Her voice actress is Kaori Nazuka in Japanese and Rebecca Forstadt in English. A spin-off manga entitled Nightmare of Nunnally focuses on her, depicting what would have happened if Nunnally had received a Geass along with Lelouch.

== Character outline ==
Nunnally was born on October 25, 2002, a.t.b. as Nunnally vi Britannia the daughter of the Emperor of Britannia, Charles zi Britannia, and Marianne vi Britannia. She was 87th in line of succession to the Britannian throne. When her mother was assassinated, Nunnally was paralysed by bullet wounds, and went blind, apparently due to psychological trauma, Lelouch believes that she may be able to see again someday. After the confrontation between Lelouch and the Emperor of Britannia about the murder of their mother, both Lelouch and Nunnally were exiled to Japan as political prisoners. They then went on to live at the Kururugi residence where she first met Suzaku Kururugi. In information provided by the novels, Nunnally privately had a terrible time coping with the changes in her life and would throw tantrums when left to her own at Kururugi residence, destroying nearly anything she could get her hands on.

After Britannia invades Japan, Lelouch hides their identity and changes their surname to Lamperouge. They then seek help from Marianne's old allies, the Ashford family, who kept their identity a secret and allowed the two siblings to live in a building on campus to accommodate her disabilities. Nunnally attends Ashford Academy's middle school and is friends with the student council Lelouch serves on.

== Character history ==
=== First season ===
Nunnally's role in the first season is rather minor, serving as little more than motivation for Lelouch's goal of overthrowing the Britannian empire and creating a world where Nunnally can live in peace. She is kidnapped by V.V. near the end of the season, and Lelouch abandons the Black Knights in the middle of battle to save her. Not only is he unsuccessful in doing so, being captured by Suzaku en route, but his departure leaves his forces powerless against the better trained Britannian forces, ending in their decisive defeat.

=== Second season (R2) ===
Nunnally vi Britannia as the Viceroy of Area 11.

The second season reveals that everyone's memories of Nunnally have been erased, Lelouch's included. Everyone at Ashford Academy believes that Rolo Lamperouge is Lelouch's younger brother instead and has been the entire time. After Nunnally was taken, Rolo took over as Lelouch's younger brother. After recovering his memory, Lelouch deduces that Nunnally is likely being held hostage by the Emperor, who would not hesitate to use his children to achieve his goals. As a result, Lelouch must try to maintain the masquerade that he has not regained his memories in order to protect her.

Nunnally makes her first appearance in the second season as a Britannian princess and the new Viceroy of Area 11. She still remembers Lelouch as her older brother, though she is unaware of his identity as Zero. Nunnally has vowed to continue her late older half-sister Princess Euphemia's will by reinstating the Special Administrative Region in Japan, sharing her and Suzaku's belief that the world can be changed in gentle ways.

After Kallen Stadtfeld is captured and sent back to Area 11, Nunnally has her transferred to a better facility and gives her a dress to wear in lieu of an ordinary prisoner jumpsuit. They strike up a conversation about Lelouch, which Suzaku interrupts. He asks to speak with Kallen alone, specifically using her prisoner number rather than her name, which Nunnally notices. She also suspects that he is lying about Lelouch to protect her. During a meeting discussing the redevelopment of the ghettos, she confronts Miss Lohmeyer on the burdens it places on the Eleven population, able to tell from holding her hand that she is downplaying the problems it will cause. She insists that it be rewritten until it does not do so.

During the second battle of Tokyo, Rolo and Sayoko are sent to retrieve Nunnally. Though Sayoko manages to commandeer the transport set to evacuate Nunnally, both are seemingly killed when they are caught in the blast radius of Nina's F.L.E.I.J.A. bomb, fired unwillingly by Suzaku (compelled by Lelouch's Geass command "to live") when his life was in danger. When Lelouch converses with Charles and Marianne in episode 21, it is revealed that Nunnally's injuries were orchestrated by V.V., who set her up to be a false witness to the murder of her mother. Her blindness, which was thought to be a result of the traumatic assassination of her own mother, was actually induced by Charles' Geass, in order to protect her against possible reprisal by V.V before sending both her and Lelouch away to Japan. However, since Charles went ahead with his war and did not care about their subsequent fate, Lelouch concluded that they were less important than his grand plan: the Ragnarök Connection. Lelouch spurns his parents, asking them why Nunnally always smiled. When they do not get the question, he answers that her smile was in gratitude since her blindness placed her at the mercy of others.

At the end of episode 22, Nunnally is revealed to be alive, having taken a different ship that evaded the F.L.E.I.J.A. She is now on board Schneizel's floating fortress, the Damocles. She declares herself to be an enemy of Lelouch and Suzaku, being supported by Schneizel as the rightful heir to the throne. However, Schneizel is actually manipulating her to ensure that she remains an enemy of Lelouch and wishes to seize the throne only for himself. Nunnally insists on being given the F.L.E.I.J.A. launch button, wanting to personally atone for her brother's sins. She is disturbed by how easy it is to launch warheads at Lelouch, destroying a large portion of his fleet and causing many deaths. When Lelouch's counterattack succeeds in reaching the Damocles, Nunnally drops the launch key and is thrown off of her wheelchair. While she is on the ground trying to find the key, she manages to break Charles' Geass with her own willpower and returns to her wheelchair before Lelouch arrives. When Lelouch confirms that he has come for the key, she opens her eyes and asks her brother if he will now use his Geass on her.

Though hesitant to use his Geass on her, Lelouch uses it after Nunnally explains she intends to turn the Damocles into a symbol of hatred to unite everyone in the world—a near-duplicate of his own plan to use himself as the symbol. Lelouch forces her to relinquish the key so he can use the Damocles to take over the world, telling her that he does and will always love her in the process. After realizing what occurred, unaware of the kind words Lelouch said to her while under her trance, Nunnally calls Lelouch a demon as she helplessly watches him leave. Two months later, Nunnally is a prisoner being taken to witness the execution of the U.F.N. and Black Knight leaders. When Suzaku, masquerading as Zero, appears and kills Lelouch, Nunnally can only watch helplessly in horror as her brother is impaled. When Lelouch falls near her, she takes his hand, and immediately understands Lelouch and Suzaku's plan, realizing the truth as her brother dies. Nunnally cries hysterically while holding her brother's lifeless body as the crowd cheers Zero. Following Lelouch's death, Nunnally ascends the throne as the Empress of Britannia, with Suzaku (as Zero) and a Geass-compelled Schneizel by her side.

== Appearances in other media ==
=== Nightmare of Nunnally ===
Front cover of volume one of Code Geass: Nightmare of Nunnally

Nightmare of Nunnally features an alternate story to the Code Geass series with Nunnally as the protagonist. It is not connected with the television series.

After the so-called "gas release" incident in the Shinjuku Ghetto, Nunnally arrives in the ruins seeking her missing brother Lelouch. A disembodied doll-like energy life form, Magical Device Nemo (魔導器ネモ, madouki nemo), appears before her and offers her a Geass contract. Nunnally accepts the contract and in turn gains the ability to see "lines of the future", a skill functionally identical to precognition. Nemo assumes an appearance resembling an albino Nunnally upon contract finalization, and the two of them come to share a single mind. Nemo's personality remains distinct from Nunnally, and is said to be a manifestation of Nunnally's subconscious negative emotions.

Nunnally and Nemo find themselves "as one" aboard the mysteriously manifested Knightmare Frame Mark Nemo. Nemo states that as per their contract, she will now become Nunnally's knight and protector. Nunnally is the only one that can see Nemo. A red, bird-like sigil lights up in Nemo's left eye when their Geass is activated. When combined with their Knightmare Frame, the Mark Nemo, Nunnally and Nemo are unstoppable on the battlefield, since every move is known to them beforehand (however, Suzaku and Alice are shown to be able to move faster than Nemo/Nunnally can read the future). In the anime, this type of Geass is used by Bismarck Waldstein, the Knight of One; however, his is slightly different, in that it only reads a specific person's "line", rather than that of the future in general.

However, there is a side effect to extensively using the Geass, that it leads to the witch's cells trying to take over Nunnally's body. When Nunnally learns that one of her recurring enemies is also Alice, her best friend from school, she breaks the contract with Nemo and falls unconscious, being captured as a result. She is saved when Nemo makes a contract with Alice, and intervenes to help Suzaku, Lelouch and Euphemia's attempt to rescue her. However, C.C.'s cells begin to take over her body, and Alice, after defeating Lelouch's twin brother Rolo vi Britannia, learns that if Nunnally goes to Kamine Island, she can be saved. Nunnally goes there with Alice, where she learns that her mother is alive and that her ability to see the lines of the future was merely a side-effect of her true Geass: "The Zero." Her Geass allows her the ability to interact with the World of C to open Heaven's Door in order for all people to become one, which her parents try to persuade her to do. Nunnally refuses after Alice tells her what she means to her, stating that there is no future in the plan that her parents want, regaining her sight and mobility in the process. This also causes Charles, Marianne and Mark Nemo to disappear forever. In the last chapter, she becomes a goodwill ambassador to Japan under Empress Euphemia, says goodbye to her brother, and makes Alice her knight.

=== Code Geass: The Manga ===
Similar to her anime counterpart, she has a limited role in the series. Unlike the anime, in the 2nd part of the storyline, she arrives after the Chinese Federation dispute and does not reestablish the Special Administrative Zone.

=== Lost Colors ===
In the video game spin-off for the PlayStation 2 and PlayStation Portable, the player can make Rai fall for Nunnally. Lelouch will be reluctant to accept their relationship, and if Nunnally is the chosen girl in the Blue Moon route, he will be with them during their first date.

In the Geass route ending, Nunnally met with Rai in her room while making origami, revealing to him that she had made a sakura flower. While Rai didn't say anything Nunnally however noticed something was wrong, which led her to tremble as she fears that he will disappear. Rai however confirmed it, but also lied her that he will return, calming Nunnally down. Nunnally later told Rai that she will continue making origami until he returns, which pleases him but was secretly saddened as he gives her his last lesson. After Rai sealed himself in the Through Elevator, a scene shows Nunnally with Sayoko seeing bright lights falling from the sky. Later Nunnally was greeted by Sayoko, who was surprised as she witnesses Nunnally's room being filled with origami. When Nunnally picked up an earlier flower shaped origami with folded creases, she unknowingly started to cry and didn't know why.

=== Nunnally in Wonderland ===
In a special OVA parody episode, based on the Alice in Wonderland story, Nunnally appears in the role of Alice.
