= Deborah Sale Butler =

American actress

Deborah Sale Butler is an American voice actress, and a speech and dialect coach. She was born on October 31, 1964, in Pittsburgh, Pennsylvania. She later moved to California to pursue a voiceover career. Her hobbies are etch-a-sketch art, playing with her cats, and science fiction. She is married to composer John Butler (born: June 25, 1964), and later gave birth to a son, Liam Butler (born: May 31, 2006), who was diagnosed with autism at the age of 3. Thus, she & her husband had decided to homeschooling their son when Liam reached the age of 8, & she kept a documental blog on, not just about how her son has progressed over the years, but her extraordinary life in homeschooling her Autistic child that she titled, We Aut To Be At Home, & continues to blog to this day.

Deborah is best known as the voice of Cecile Croomy from the Code Geass series, the lead role of Mai Shibamura from Gunparade March, Shute from SD Gundam, as well as the lead role of Layla Ashley from Avenger.

== Notable roles ==
=== Anime ===
- Appleseed as Scientist
- Avenger as Layla Ashley
- Busou Renkin as Chitose Tateyama
- Code Geass: Lelouch of the Rebellion as Cécile Croomy
- Ghost in the Shell: Stand Alone Complex as Varieties
- Gunparade March as Mai Shibamura
- Marmalade Boy as Akiko Kitahara; Yayoi's Friend 1
- SD Gundam Force as Shute

=== Video game roles ===
- Project Horned Owl as Kate L
- SD Gundam Force: Showdown! as Shute
- Fruity Pebbles Campaign as Wilma Flintstone
- EverQuest as various characters
- EverQuest II: Revamp as Trainer Marla Gilliam, Lieutenant Delsun, Lyssia, Delnara, Sevri Il' Bethod, Gunta and Emma Torque
- World of Warcraft as various characters
- I Love Bees Halo prequel" as Gilly
- Slave Zero as Li
- Starcon as Pkunk, Ship's Computer, Colonist
- Heavy Gear 2 as Helene del Pulchiano
- Civilization: Call to Power as Rebel Colonist
- Shanghai: Second Dynasty as Computer, Babysitter
- Shadow Tower as Featured Characters
- Echo Night as Featured Characters
- Where in the World is Carmen Sandiego? as Featured Characters
- Where in the USA is Carmen Sandiego as Featured Characters
- Write, Camera, Action as Bailey
- James Discovers Math as Featured Characters
- Morgan's Trivia Machine as Morgan, Hip Hop Hippo and Bernardvaark
- Recess in Greece as Morgan, Hip Hop Hippo and Bernardvaark
- Rising Zan: The Samurai Gunman as Valerie
- The Revolutionary War as Morgan, Hip Hop Hippo and Bernardvaark
- The Dirty Dwarves as Laura and Kyle
- 101 Dalmatians as Featured Characters
- Star Trek: The Next Generation as Admiral Williams, Commander Likse
- World of Final Fantasy as Undead Princess
- Oil Rush as Assistant
- Octopath Traveler as additional voices
