= Superior Defender Gundam Force =

Japanese anime television series

- SDガンダムフォース
- Genre: Mecha, Science Fiction, Adventure, Comedy
- Created by: Hajime Yatate; Yoshiyuki Tomino
- Directed by: Yuuichi Abe
- Character designer: Takahiro Kimura
- Music by: Yoshihiro Ike
- No. of episodes: 52

Production
- Producers: Norio Yamakawa (TV Tokyo); Shigeru Horiguchi; Masakatzu Kozuru
- Production companies: TV Tokyo; Sunrise; Sotsu Agency

Original release
- Network: TXN (TV Tokyo)
- Release: 7 January – 29 December 2004

Superior Defender Gundam Force, or SD Gundam Force (Japanese: SDガンダムフォース, Hepburn: Esudī Gandamu Fōsu), is a 2004 Japanese-American anime television series produced by Sunrise. The series was released to celebrate the 25th anniversary of the Gundam media franchise, and was the first Gundam series to be entirely animated in cel-shaded 3D computer graphics (3DCG), and the first full-3DCG series to be broadcast on Japanese television. The show was directed by Yūichi Abe.

== Overview ==
A Japan/America co-production, 26 episodes of Superior Defender Gundam Force initially aired on the Cartoon Network in the U.S., and later 52 episodes were broadcast on TV Tokyo in Japan, making it the longest Gundam series ever broadcast. The TV show was the first Japanese anime not to be released on VHS; its home video releases are only available on DVD with each containing three episodes. Though the final 26 episodes were not aired on television in America, fans petitioned for the second half of the series to be released and the last 26 episodes were released in an English-dubbed DVD set in 2008.

The title of the show is a reference to the SD Gundam, or Super-Deformed Gundam sub-franchise, though for this show, SD stands for Superior Defender. It is a crossover series based on the three SD Gundam settings that were used in earlier SD Gundam anime and manga: SD Command Chronicles, a science-fiction-styled militaristic setting; Musha Gundam, a setting with samurai-themed robots; and Knight Gundam, a medieval European fantasy-themed setting. It also contains many references and homages to the standard Gundam shows, especially those of the Universal Century, Future Century, and After Colony timelines. In a sharp contrast to the dark nature of most of the other Gundam series, SD Gundam Force is relatively lighthearted, though it does at times get more serious as the series goes on, it is never as dark as the more "traditional" Gundam series.

== Synopsis ==
The story is set in the futuristic city of Neotopia, a happy peaceful place where humans and robots co-exist, until the Dark Axis, an evil force from another dimension, arrives.

Aware of the Dark Axis in advance, Neotopia established the secret Super Dimensional Guard to combat the invaders while keeping the conflict a secret from the public. A young boy named Shute becomes involved accidentally in the first battle between the Dark Axis and the SDG's Gundam Force robot hero, Captain Gundam. Shute's friendship with the Captain is critical to activating Captain's Soul Drive, the mysterious power source that is the key to victory. As the fighting continues, Gundams from other dimensions such as Zero and Bakunetsumaru, arrive to join the battle as allies. As the Gundam Force beats back the mono-eyed invaders the battle spreads beyond Neotopia into the dimensions of Lacroa and Ark, leading into a final confrontation with the supreme leader of the Dark Axis - General Zeong.

== Characters ==
The characters of SD Gundam Force are split into two major factions- Super Dimensional Guard and Dark Axis. Amongst these are various sub-factions/alliances, usually designated by their members land of origin.

== Cast & crew ==
Character	Japanese Voice actor	English Voice actor
Shute	Romi Park	Deborah Sale Butler
Captain Gundam	Hiroshi Kamiya	Doug Erholtz
Bakunetsumaru	Susumu Chiba	Yuri Lowenthal
Zero	Mitsuki Saiga	Aliki Theofilopoulos
Guneagle,	Daisuke Namikawa	Dave Wittenberg
Gunbike	Eiji Yanagisawa	Paul St. Peter
Gundivers/Gunchoppers	Kazuya Nakai	
Gunpanzer	Eiji Yanagisawa	
Entengo	Kentaro Ito	Danny Katiana
Fenn		Doug Erholtz
Chief Haro, Mark	Takahiro Yoshimizu	Scott Jasper
Juli	Kaoru Morota	Kate Savage
Kao Lyn		Danny Katiana
Bell Wood	Isao Yamagishi	Aliki Theofilopoulos
Sayla	Akiko Nakagawa	Michelle Ruff
Nana	Akiko Nakagawa	
Keiko	Aya Hisakawa	Kate Savage
Mayor Margaret Gathermoon	Rei Sakuma	Philece Sampler
Leonardo	Takashi Nagasako	Paul St. Peter
Elmechu	Sawa Ishige	
Hogaremaru	Daisuke Namikawa	
Genkimaru	Yumiko Kobayashi	Wendee Lee
Daishogun of Perfect Virtue	Juurouta Kosugi	
Commander Sazabi, Zako Red	Shuichi Ikeda	Dominic Joseph
Zapper Zaku	Eiji Yanagisawa	Danny Katiana
Grappler Gouf	Mantaro Iwao	Doug Erholtz
Destroyer Dom	Hiroshi Matsumoto	Scott Jasper
Professor Gerbra/Madnug	Akio Ōtsuka	Michael McConnohie
Kibaomaru	Masayuki Tanaka	Jamieson Price
Tallgeese, Epyon	Taiten Kusunoki	Paul St. Peter
Deathscythe/Deed	Kentaro Ito	Dave Wittenberg
Ashuramaru	Katsuyuki Konishi	Dominic Joseph
Cobramaru	Kiyoyuki Yanada	
Zakos	Kentaro Ito, Takashi Nagasako, Hisanori Koyatsu, Daisuke Kita, Tamotsu Nishiwaki	Aliki Theofilopoulos, Doug Erholtz (Zaku Hour co-host)
Pawn Leos	Takayuki Kondou	
Zakerello Gate	Takashi Nagasako	Paul St. Peter
Patrol GM	Hiroshi Matsumoto	
Relehimana Miya De Lacroa	Miyu Matsuki	Kate Savage (first half), Kari Wahlgren (second half)
Nataku	Takayuki Kondou	
Battle	Tamotsu Nishiwaki	
Rock	Takuya Kirimoto	
Koah	Erino Hazuki	Michelle Ruff
Doah	Yū Sugimoto	Kate Savage
Noah	Kaori Matoi	Philece Sampler
Grey Doga		Dominic Joseph
Prio		Dominic Joseph
Young Train		Dominic Joseph

== Differences between English and Japanese versions ==
Although SD Gundam Force was designed with US standards in mind, subtle differences exist between the English- and Japanese-language versions of the show. These include:

- In the intro for the English version of episode 8 "A Princess, A Cake, and A Winged Knight", Shute begins his usual description for Neotopia, but instead calls it Ypsilanti, Michigan then laughs says he's "just kidding" and continues on with his usual intro.
- Various eyecatches are used in the Japanese version, while the English release uses only one. Examples of the differences in the Japanese version include one featuring Mayor Margaret with the various Neotopian Ball mecha, and subtle changes to the standard animation such as Bakunetsumaru tripping over, causing his helmet to fall off.
- The Japanese version has a set of specific OPs and EDs while the US version uses scenes/screenshots from the show. While the Japanese version uses similar for its OPs, the EDs are mostly new animation:

- OP 1 "Sunrise" by Puffy AmiYumi (eps. 1-13)
- OP 2 "Love & Peace" by Little by Little (eps. 14-26)
- OP 3 "Taiyou ni Kogarete" by Harebare (eps. 27-52)
- ED 1 "Shinjiru Chikara" by Whiteberry (eps. 1-13) - A Zako soldier steals Sayla's umbrella, prompting Shute to give chase. Initially unsuccessful, Captain convinces him not to give up and Shute finally manages to retrieve it.
- ED 2 "Kokoro Odoru" by nobodyknows+ (eps. 14-26) - Various members of the cast dancing.
- ED 3 "Kimi to Boku" by I WiSH (eps. 27-38) - The Gundamusai flying through the Minov Sea.
- ED 4 "Koishikute..." by Les.R (eps. 39-52) - Scenes of Princess Rele.

- In the episode "Cobramaru's Tears", Cobramaru attempts ritual suicide to repent for failing his master Kibaomaru. As the issue of attempted suicide in a children's show would be controversial in most English-speaking countries, the dialogue in the English-language version was changed to imply that Kibaomaru is ordering Cobramaru to kill himself and/or go into exile.
- In the Japanese version, certain characters are voiced by the voice actors of the past Gundam characters they are referencing. As the Gundam dubs have used various voice acting casts this homage was not used in the English-language version.

== Adaptations & spinoffs ==
=== Manga ===
SD Gundam Force has two manga adaptations. These include: a serialized retelling of the show, SD Gundam Force, and a sidestory manga, Superior Defender Gundam Force Gaiden.

Similar to most TV-to-manga adaptations, the 3-volume adaptation makes various subtle but notable changes for pacing reasons. Examples include: the complete absence of Gunbike/Gunpanzer, and Madnug managing to override his brainwashing, only to be killed by Zeong for his betrayal.

The sidestory manga presents stories of Captain Gundam, Bakunetsumaru, Zero, Zapper Zaku, Grappler Gouf and Destroyer Dom that cover untold additions to the show as well as character backstories.

=== Video games ===
Two games have been released based on the show: a side scrolling platform game for the Game Boy Advance (GBA) and a 3D action adventure game for the PlayStation 2. The GBA game retells the story of the first 26 episodes of the show and allows players to play as either Captain Gundam, Bakunetsumaru, or Zero the Winged Knight. Characters can be switched at any time (for the cost of one bar from the special attack meter) and players need to use each character's strengths to successfully complete the game.

The PS2 title was a much grander affair, presenting a brand new story. The mysterious Dimensional Halo appears in Neotopia and creates mirror versions of Neotopia, Lacroa and Ark. The Gundam Force are forced to battle their way through these copy dimensions and even face their own evil doppelgangers to reach De Scar Road and defeat the Dimensional Halo. Each Gundam Force member has a variety of new forms they can achieve including one super secret form for each which can only be unlocked by a code. The code was presented on a Japanese trading card and eventually filtered to the Western fandom. The game eventually allows the player to play as a Zako soldier.

The Dimensional Halo and its minions were based on the weapons of the Zanscare Empire in Victory Gundam. The game also features further references to the earlier UC, FC and AC timeline in the form of new villains to populate the mirror dimensions.

The second track used in the series' closing credits, Kokoro Odoru by nobodyknows+, featured in the 2005 Nintendo DS rhythm action game Osu! Tatakae! Ouendan.

=== The Ride ===
During the show's run in Japan, a limited time attraction was opened. Titled SD Gundam Force: Destructive Daishogun Appears!!Zako?, the twenty-minute show used a special theater to present a whole new SD Gundam Force adventure with which the audience could interact. Seemingly set in between episodes 26 and 27, although overall it is best treated as being non-canon, the stars of the show are the Zakos who have been forced to become the SDG's cleaning crew. The Lacroan villain Da Jarle Knight of the Hammer, and the Ark Destructive Daishogun Hakaimaru, seek to unify the world with the mysterious Zakarello Mobile. Da Jarle is able to change the appearance of others and Hakaimaru has a bath fetish that leads him to create a 'Super Bathhouse' command station. The audience and the Zakos join the Gundam Force as they attempt to stop this new alliance.

Original characters were created for the show by Masato Ichishiki, author of the SD Gundam Musha Maruden/SD Gundam Force Emaki Musharetsuden/SD Gundam Musha Banchō Fūunroku manga. Motion capture data was taken from Japanese pro-wrestler Shinya Hashimoto for Hakaimaru's movements. While Hakaimaru appears to be a generic Musha Gundam, Da Jarle resembles an OZ-12SMS Taurus.

The video portion of this attraction is included as an extra on the complete Japanese SD Gundam Force DVD box set.

== Reception ==
Season 1 of the series aired in the U.S. four months ahead of the Japanese release and was the first Gundam series to do so. However, despite its success in the US, Season 2 was not broadcast in North American markets due to the first season's disappointing ratings in Japan when it premiered later.

Also, at the time it was aired, SD Gundam Force was the least-watched Gundam title in Japan, having averaged a 2.1% TV rating in the Kantō region during its broadcast.

Preceded by Mobile Suit Gundam SEED	Gundam metaseries (production order); 2004	Succeeded by Mobile Suit Gundam MS IGLOO
