= List of Code Geass characters =

Code Geass: Lelouch of the Rebellion (コードギアス 反逆のルルーシュ, Kōdo Giasu: Hangyaku no Rurūshu) and its sequel series Code Geass: Lelouch of the Rebellion R2 (コードギアス 反逆のルルーシュR2, Kōdo Giasu Hangyaku no Rurūshu Āru Tsū) are Japanese anime made by Sunrise, directed by Gorō Taniguchi and written by Ichirō Ōkouchi. The series is focused around a former prince of the Holy Britannian Empire, Lelouch Vi Britannia, who obtains a mysterious power known as Geass and uses this power to destroy the Holy Britannian Empire, a superpower that controls one third of the world and has recently conquered Japan, and to discover the truth behind his mother's death, as well as the various people that he encounters as he heads toward those goals.

This is a list of characters, minor and major, appearing in both Code Geass: Lelouch of the Rebellion, its sequel series, and/or the core series' spin-offs and products. The fictional characters in Code Geass: Lelouch of the Rebellion were designed by the manga studio Clamp.

== Creation and conception ==
During early planning stages, director Gorō Taniguchi contacted the noted manga artist group Clamp, being the first time Clamp had ever been requested to design the characters of an anime series. Clamp signed onto the project early during these development stages and provided numerous ideas, which helped develop the series' setting and characters. Clamp's finalized original character design art, illustrated by its lead artist Mokona, was subsequently converted into animation character designs for the series by Sunrise's character designer Takahiro Kimura, who had previously spent "every day" analyzing Clamp's art and style from their art-books and manga series. In working on the animation character designs, he focused on designing them so as to enable the series' other animators to apply them without deviating from Clamp's original art style.

== Main characters ==
=== Lelouch Lamperouge ===
Voiced by: Jun Fukuyama (Japanese); Johnny Yong Bosch (English)
Young Lelouch
Voiced by: Sayaka Ohara (Japanese); Michelle Ruff (English)

Lelouch Lamperouge (ルルーシュ・ランペルージ, Rurūshu Ranperūji) is the protagonist of Code Geass. Originally born as Lelouch vi Britannia (ルルーシュ・ヴィ・ブリタニア, Rurūshu vi Buritania), he is the Eleventh Prince of the Britannian Imperial Family and seventeenth in line for the throne. His father is the Britannian Emperor, Charles zi Britannia and his mother was Marianne vi Britannia. For questioning his father's cold apathy towards his mother's assassination and his sister Nunnally's disablement, Lelouch and Nunnally were sent to Japan as political hostages. Taken into the residence of the Prime Minister of Japan, Lelouch and Nunnally soon formed a strong friendship with the Prime Minister's son, Suzaku Kururugi. When Britannia invaded Japan, he went into hiding with his sister, taking refuge with the Ashford family. Seven years later he discovers C.C., who grants him a Geass that allows him to command any person to follow his subsequent order. Seeking to build a peaceful world for his sister even though all she wants is to be with him, he begins to orchestrate a revolution, pursuing the destruction of Britannia under the guise of his masked alter-ego, Zero. As Zero, he creates a military force known as the Black Knights, formed from the members of a group originally known as the Japanese Resistance.

=== Suzaku Kururugi ===
Voiced by: Takahiro Sakurai (Japanese); Yuri Lowenthal (English)
Young Suzaku
Voiced by: Akeno Watanabe (Japanese); Laura Bailey (English)

Suzaku Kururugi (枢木スザク, Kururugi Suzaku) is Lelouch's childhood friend and son of Japan's last prime minister, Genbu Kururugi. He murdered his father when he was a child in the belief that it would end the war between Britannia and Japan, but only paved the way for Japan's conquering. Traumatized, he also begins to find a way to liberate Japan. However, in stark contrast to Lelouch, he claims to support reformism and that achieving results by wrong or illegal methods is meaningless, wanting to change Britannia from within. As such, he is aligned against Zero's Black Knights, but nevertheless intent on changing the Britannian Empire for the better. In reality, however, this is an illusion, as Suzaku actually wishes to be KIA in order to atone for his father's death. Suzaku is an Honorary Britannian and part of the Britannian army, later becoming the pilot of the experimental Knightmare Frame Lancelot as a member of the R&D Division. In the second season, Suzaku is granted a position in the Knights of the Round by the Emperor for his capture of Zero. At the same time, however, he becomes a repeatedly hypocritical anti villain, focusing on publicly exposing and killing Lelouch in an attempt to avenge the death of Euphemia, and is not above murdering and torturing others to get his way. Over the course of the second season, he slowly starts to see the error in his ways, and eventually becomes part of the Zero Requiem.

=== C.C. ===
Voiced by: Yukana (Japanese); Kate Higgins (English)

C.C. (シー・ツー, Shī Tsū; pronounced "C2") is the main female protagonist of the series. She is an immortal "witch" who bestows the power of Geass upon Lelouch under the condition he grants her greatest wish, later revealed to be for Lelouch, let alone anyone, to kill her. She oversees Lelouch's activities and assists in his plans in order to ensure that he remains alive to fulfill their contract. Lelouch often refers to her as the witch and himself as the "demon lord". She is seen to be quite close to Lelouch and advises him whenever he is feeling lost. C.C. often comes to get Lelouch out of a tough situation when his identity is about to be revealed. Despite this, she routinely gets on his nerves, often sneaking out without his permission or ordering Pizza Hut (which sponsors Code Geass in Japan) with his credit card.

=== Kallen Kouzuki ===
Voiced by: Ami Koshimizu (Japanese); Karen Strassman (English)

Kallen Stadtfeld (カレン・シュタットフェルト, Karen Shutattoferuto) is a half-Britannian, half-Japanese teenage girl. Her father is Britannian and her mother is an Eleven; her father comes from a prestigious Britannian family, known as the Stadtfeld family, which Kallen benefits from. She attends the Ashford Academy, where she pretends to be a sickly, milquetoast student to explain her prolonged absences and changes in her appearance. She later becomes a member of its student council and one of the school's most outstanding students. In school, she is known by her legal name but she prefers her mother's maiden name and goes by the alias Kallen Kōuzuki (紅月カレン, Kōzuki Karen) during her revolutionary activities. Kallen is initially a member of a Japanese resistance cell led by Ohgi, using her brother's death as motivation, and later joins Zero's Black Knights. She is the group's most talented pilot and on par with the Knights of the Round. Throughout the series, her devotion to Zero is unmatched among any of the other members of the Black Knights, almost being Lelouch's female counterpart. Conversely, she dislikes Lelouch, despite constant remarks from others about intimacy in their relationship, and is dismayed when her Knightmare rival, Suzaku, reveals that Lelouch and Zero are the same people. However, when she learns more about Lelouch's noble desires via C.C. and Nunnally, she helps protect his identity and ultimately develops feelings for him.

== Ashford Academy ==
From left to right: Rivalz, Arthur (the black cat on the bike), Kallen, Sayoko, Suzaku, Lelouch, C.C., Shirley, Milly, Nina, and Nunnally.

Ashford Academy (アッシュフォード学園, Asshufōdo Gakuen) is a Britannian private academy in Tokyo, owned and operated by the Ashford Foundation (アッシュフォード財団, Asshufōdo Zaidan), a philanthropic organization involved predominantly in the supply of educational services, founded by the formerly noble Ashford House. It is attended by Lelouch and Nunnally, who, owing to their mother's past relationship with the Ashfords, have been granted free residence within the campus's Student Government Clubhouse. In the manga, it is implied that the academy itself was once Japanese owned and operated.

=== Nunnally Lamperouge ===
Voiced by: Kaori Nazuka (Japanese); Rebecca Forstadt (English)

Nunnally Lamperouge (ナナリー・ランペルージ, Nanarī Ranperūji) is Lelouch's younger sister, originally born as Nunnally vi Britannia (ナナリー・ヴィ・ブリタニア, Nanarī vi Buritania). Injured in her mother Marianne's brutal assassination, she uses a wheelchair and is blind from psychological trauma. It is on her behalf that Lelouch pursues the destruction of Britannia and the forging of a peaceful world. Following her return to the Imperial Family in the second season, she retakes her birth name, Nunnally vi Britannia, and is at her own request appointed Viceroy of Area 11.

=== Shirley Fenette ===
Voiced by: Fumiko Orikasa (Japanese); Amy Kincaid, Laura Bailey (child) (English)

Shirley Fenette (シャーリー・フェネット, Shārī Fenetto) is a friendly girl and is a member of the swimming club. She has a habit of giving people pet names, such as calling Lelouch "Lulu". When she was a freshman, she disliked Lelouch, but after witnessing him, who was with Rivalz, discreetly humiliate a road-raged driver that was abusing an elderly couple without taking any credit, she became curious about him and eventually fell madly in love with him. Consequently, she jealously believes that he and Kallen are romantically linked (due to awkward exchanges between them), and is constantly teased about it by Milly, unaware she is merely jealous of the fact she can choose who she loves. After the Black Knights, led by Lelouch's alter ego Zero, indirectly cause the death of her father, the distressed Shirley discovers that Lelouch is Zero, and shoots Villetta Nu to protect his secret. She tries to write a letter about her feelings on the situation to Lelouch, only to throw it aside. Mao then uses his mind-reading Geass to manipulate her into killing Lelouch for him, but she cannot bring herself to do so. To alleviate her suffering, Lelouch uses his Geass to erase Shirley's memories of him. Shirley rediscovers her letter near the end of the first season, but cannot confront Lelouch about it because of the rebellion that takes place.

In the second season, Shirley's memories, along with the rest of Ashford's Student Council, have been rewritten by the Emperor, while her affection for Lelouch has returned as an apparent consequence. Her memories are inadvertently restored by Jeremiah Gottwald's Geass Canceler. Despite this and traumatic illusions of masks that come as a result, she decides to forgive Lelouch and tries yet fails to get Suzaku to do the same. Shirley then tries to ally with Rolo, but he uses his Geass and fatally shoots her in the stomach with a gun she is holding when she shows knowledge of Nunnally's existence, and she eventually dies after professing love to a devastated Lelouch. Her death is justified by Rolo as being because she wanted to kill Lelouch in her trauma, yet is ruled a suicide publicly.

In the recap film trilogy, her fate is avoided by having her not go into a depressed state following the death of her father, with Diethard being the one to shoot Villetta instead of her. As a result, she never has her memories altered by Lelouch, and ultimately does not have the experience of regaining her memories. This leads her to survive past the Zero Requiem.

=== Nina Einstein ===
Voiced by: Saeko Chiba (Japanese); Kim Mai Guest (English)

Nina Einstein (ニーナ・アインシュタイン, Nīna Ainshutain) is introduced as a bookish member of the student council at Ashford Academy. For unspecified reasons, Nina demonstrates an acute xenophobic reaction to Elevens and is immediately intimidated by Suzaku when he arrives in the school. Because of this, she develops a deep lesbian obsession with Third Princess Euphemia after she helps her during a traumatizing hostage incident at the Lake Kawaguchi Convention Center Hotel, and not only calls her a "goddess" and thinks she can rely on her for emotional support, but even goes as far as to masturbate over her picture, all while unaware of Euphemia's pro-Japanese intentions. Lloyd Asplund is interested in Nina's personal research regarding the possibility of using Uranium-235 as a fuel. Following Euphemia's death, Nina becomes emotionally and mentally unstable. In a misguided attempt to avenge Euphemia, she arms the Ashford's Ganymede Knightmare Frame with a prototype nuclear bomb and intends to detonate it to kill Zero, but it fails to explode and she is arrested.

In the second season, Nina becomes an antagonist and is recruited by Second Prince Schneizel as chief of his "In Vogue" research team headquartered in Dallas, Texas. Under him, she eventually creates a working bomb, F.L.E.I.J.A. (Field Limitary Effective Implosion Armament, pronounced "flaya"), that vaporizes everything within a specific radius. When Schneizel sets it up so that Suzaku detonates over Tokyo, Nina is shocked and devastated by the destruction caused by her own weapon, which causes more than 35 million casualties when Suzaku's Geass causes him to fire it on Tokyo Settlement. Nina is forced to go into hiding shortly thereafter within Ashford Academy, as she is considered a criminal for her connection with the development of F.L.E.I.J.A. Lelouch enlists her aid in creating a countermeasure to F.L.E.I.J.A., learning that Schneizel made it even more deadly. She is later seen as a prisoner of Emperor Lelouch, along with the rest of the Black Knights and several Lelouch supporters, though she's not slated for execution, and after Lelouch's death is able to overcome her xenophobia and mania.

=== Sayoko Shinozaki ===
Voiced by: Satomi Arai (Japanese); Kim Mai Guest (English)

Sayoko Shinozaki (篠崎 咲世子, Shinozaki Sayoko) is a kind-hearted Japanese woman who serves as a maid to the Lamperouge siblings in their residence. She was originally Milly Ashford's personal maid, but was reassigned to Lelouch and Nunnally when they were placed under the Ashfords' care. Her relatively benign appearance contrasts with her position as the 37th successor of the Shinozaki School (篠崎流, Shinozaki-ryū) of martial arts. She is a highly skilled martial artist, carrying smoke bombs and a number of kunai strapped to her thighs, and has matching athletic talents. Lelouch reveals his secret identity to her in the second season, and she poses as his double at Ashford while he is away. Though she is able to play the part somewhat convincingly, she portrays him as a womanizer. During the second battle of Tokyo, she leads a mission with Rolo to secure Nunnally, and is almost caught in the blast radius of the F.L.E.I.J.A. bomb. However, both she and Nunnally manage to escape in the ship and are taken to Schneizel. Sayoko escapes, though wounded, and returns to Lelouch to warn him about Schneizel's plan. When the Avalon is boarded by the Black Knights, Lelouch had her release the U.F.N. hostages under the guise of betraying him. She is later imprisoned alongside Rakshata, Nina, and Cécile but is set free after Zero Requiem.

=== Milly Ashford ===
Voiced by: Sayaka Ohara (Japanese); Julie Ann Taylor (English)

Milly Ashford (ミレイ・アッシュフォード, Mirei Asshufōdo) is the granddaughter of the school superintendent, and president of the Student Council. Milly enjoys teasing Shirley and is eager to discover Lelouch's weaknesses. Milly is aware of Lelouch's identity as a former prince of Britannia, her family having supported Empress Marianne. Marianne's assassination led to the family's nobility status being stripped. Consequently, the Ashfords arrange for Milly to marry Earl Lloyd Asplund to restore it. After the events of the first season, Milly remains a student on campus because she failed her examinations, although it is noted that she did so on purpose to remain on campus with her friends. In the second season, she eventually earns enough credits to graduate and after graduating she becomes a reporter on the local TV news and breaks off her engagement with Lloyd in an effort to become more true to herself.

=== Rivalz Cardemonde ===
Voiced by: Noriaki Sugiyama (Japanese); Brian Beacock (English)

Rivalz Cardemonde (リヴァル・カルデモンド, Rivaru Karudemondo) is one of Lelouch's friends, usually driving Lelouch around on his motorbike as an ante for their bets on chess games. He has a part-time job as a bartender/waiter and carries unrequited love for Milly Ashford, especially when it is announced that she is going through a marriage interview. Shown in-series and in the DVD-exclusive bonus material, Rivalz forms a fast friendship with Suzaku after he joins the student council at Lelouch's request. Rivalz's real surname is not Cardemonde, which is his mother's maiden name that he uses after his parents became estranged.

=== Arthur ===
Voiced by: Kikuko Inoue (Japanese); Michelle Ruff (English)

Arthur (アーサー, Āsā) is a stray cat which Third Princess Euphemia befriends after she arrives in Area 11. Arthur is later chased throughout the school grounds by the entire student body after wandering into the Lamperouge residence and escaping with Lelouch's Zero mask stuck on his head. The student council adopts her and builds a cat house in the council room. A running gag in the series involves Arthur constantly biting Suzaku in various places. Despite this they are still very affectionate towards each other, to the point where Suzaku took her when he joined the Knights of the Round. He is last seen mourning at Suzaku's grave, and is later adopted by Anya.

=== Rolo Lamperouge ===
Voiced by: Takahiro Mizushima (Japanese); Spike Spencer (English)

Rolo Lamperouge (ロロ・ランペルージ, Roro Ranperuji) is introduced in the second season as an assassin posing as Lelouch's brother, placed there to observe Lelouch following his memory rewrite at the end of the first season. Rolo pilots the Vincent Prototype, and possesses a Geass power in his right eye that allows him to temporarily freeze the subjective experience of time for all persons within a given range. Whenever Rolo uses this power, his heart stops until the effect ends. He is manipulated by Lelouch into supporting the Black Knights and seems to become dependent on Lelouch over time. He is however aware of Lelouch's manipulation due to past manipulations but still loves him as a brother and later sacrifices his life to save Lelouch from the Black Knights. Lelouch accepts him as his brother and gives him a funeral.

== The Black Knights ==
Various members of the Black Knights, from left to right: Inoue, Yoshida, Ohgi, Kallen, Sayoko, Diethard, Zero, C.C., Kaguya, Rakshata, Tohdoh, Tamaki, Kento, and Yoshitaka.

The Black Knights (黒の騎士団, Kuro no Kishidan) are a group of revolutionaries created by Lelouch (under the guise of Zero) in his campaign to overthrow Britannia. He introduces the group to the world as an organization which protects those without power from those who have it. Under his leadership, the Black Knights grow in strength exponentially, becoming a force rivaling the Britannian army. Ultimately, the Black Knights gain legitimacy when the newly formed United Federation of Nations contracts the Black Knights (re-organized as a private military company) to become their military force, in exchange for funding, manpower, and support.

The core members of the Black Knights are the remnants of a resistance cell led by Kaname Ohgi, which Lelouch becomes involved with early in the first season. Also among its upper echelon are the Japan Liberation Front (日本解放戦線, Nippon Kaihō Sensen), the largest anti-Britannia resistance group prior to the appearance of the Black Knights, consisting predominantly of former Japanese military personnel. Among these ranks are the Four Holy Swords (四聖剣, Shisei-ken), an elite unit consisting of Kyoshiro Tohdoh and four of his most devoted followers. After Cornelia takes over as Viceroy of Area 11, her campaigns all but wipe out the Japan Liberation Front. Tohdoh is captured by Britannian forces, and after he is rescued by the Black Knights at the Four Holy Swords' behest, his group joins them in their activities. Finally, the Six Houses of Kyōto (キョウト六家, Kyōto Rokka), called Kyōto for short, a secret society of former Japanese elite aligned against Britannia, also provide support for the Black Knights in particular by supplying equipment, weapons, and Knightmare Frames. The Sumeragi House (represented by young Kaguya) leads the organization. As per the organization's official title, six families hold seats in the administrative council. After the failed Black Rebellion, all but Kaguya are executed as accomplices to terrorism.

After the second battle of Tokyo in the Second Black Rebellion, a Britannian envoy carrying Schneizel el Britannia lands on the Black Knights' flagship, the Ikaruga. In a meeting with a majority of the Black Knights' core members, Schneizel reveals Zero's true identity and Geass as well as insinuating that Lelouch has used his Geass to make them nothing more than his pawns. This, along with Villetta and Ohgi's testimony further drives a wedge among the Black Knights. Following Ohgi's suggestion, the Black Knights decided to betray Lelouch in exchange for the liberation of Japan. Diethard convinces the others to announce that Zero died of injuries sustained in battle, as no one would believe the truth and they would be stripped of their positions if they tried to explain it. Kallen later takes the role temporarily.

Ohgi is forced to reveal the truth to Kaguya and Xingke when Lelouch causes a rebellion within the Emperor's forces. A month later, the Black Knights are stunned when Lelouch takes the Britannian throne for himself. After Lelouch conquered Japan and took the UFN leaders hostage, they allied themselves with Schneizel's forces to oppose Lelouch.

After the Black Knights were defeated by Lelouch, Suzaku took up the mantle of Zero. He proceeded to kill Lelouch in order to complete the Zero Requiem. Afterwards, Suzaku has become the new leader of the new incarnation of the Black Knights and protector of Empress Nunnally to lead peace and justice.

=== Kaname Ohgi ===
Voiced by: Mitsuaki Madono (Japanese); Kirk Thornton (English)

Kaname Ōgi (扇 要, Ōgi Kaname) is the leader of the original resistance cell. He took over leadership following the death of Kallen's older brother, Naoto Kouzuki (紅月ナオト, Kōzuki Naoto), leaving his teaching job to do so. He is a somewhat reserved individual who lacks self-confidence, often questioning his ability to lead. However, he is also fairly perceptive, recognizing Zero's intentions to a degree and even deducing some of the things he keeps secret from the organization. When Zero reorganizes the Black Knights, he appoints Ōgi as deputy commander.

Following a battle in which the Japan Liberation Front is all but wiped out, Ōgi finds Villetta Nu left for dead at a ship dock. He nurses her back to health, and lets her live with him when she cannot remember who she is. Though he knows she has seen Zero's face, he cannot bring himself to kill her or use Refrain to recover her memories. Over time, he falls in love with her. During the Black Rebellion, Ōgi is shot by Villetta, who has regained her memories.

Despite being captured in the Black Rebellion, Ōgi maintains his faith in Zero, knowing that Zero alone can liberate Japan. During the opening ceremony for the second Special Administration Region in Japan, he prevents Villetta from being shot. She suspects it is him, but he doesn't confirm her suspicions and bids her farewell. Later, Villetta arranges a meeting with Ōgi, intending to kill him to erase her links to the Elevens. Ōgi comes knowing full well what she intends to do, and confesses his love for her. Villetta is captured during an altercation with Sayoko and held hostage by Diethard to ensure Ōgi's loyalty, but is set free shortly after the second battle of Tokyo is cut short. She and Ōgi believe and lead on the leaders of the Black Knights that Schneizel's claims are valid. However, Ōgi adamantly insists that Japan be freed if they betray Zero, feeling that he couldn't forgive himself if any less came of it. Diethard notes that it is in Ōgi's nature to protect, not lead, and considers his new leadership role a "miscast". During the battle against Lelouch, he has Villetta stay on Horai Island as she is pregnant. He then orders the operators of the Ikaruga to evacuate. The battle is lost and he is captured and scheduled for public execution, but is saved when Lelouch is killed by Suzaku dressed as Zero. He marries Villetta at the end of the second season, and is elected Prime Minister of Japan.

=== Shinichirō Tamaki ===
Voiced by: Kazunari Tanaka (TV series), Nobuyuki Hiyama (films) (Japanese); Michael Lindsay (TV series), Christopher Bevins (film) (English)

Shinichirō Tamaki (玉城 真一郎, Tamaki Shin'ichirō) is the leader of the second special squadron of the Black Knights. He is hot-headed, carefree and the self-proclaimed best friend of Zero, quick to cheer others on when not doing the fighting but rash and impulsive when he is on the front lines. His rashness is shown to border on recklessness, as he orders the execution of the Ashford Academy student council against Zero's wishes, though extenuating circumstances prevent his orders from being carried out. He pilots a standard Knightmare during battles, but is rather inept at that; his frame is the first to be destroyed by Suzaku's Lancelot in the first season and in all encounters after that, Tamaki is rather comically dispatched very early in battle, which ends up hurting his pride in the end of the second season.

Tamaki dreams of being a bureaucrat, and states that if he did not have his dream to aim for, he would probably have become a Refrain user. He is initially skeptical about Zero, but comes to be one of his most vehement supporters, particularly after the Specially Administrated Zone of Japan fails. Tamaki also complains about his own lack of an official position in the second season, wanting to be in charge of finances in some way. With the formation of the United Federation of Nations and the Black Knights' appointment as its unified army, Tamaki is made the Internal Cleaning Supporter. When Lelouch is exposed as Zero, Tamaki takes it the hardest, being the last to accept that Zero could have manipulated them all this time. At the end of the series, Tamaki opens his own bistro alongside Sugiyama, Minami, and Villetta.

=== Four Holy Swords ===
The Four Holy Swords are a group of soldiers that serve as the primary fighting force of the Japan Liberation Front, the country's strongest yet very exclusive resistance group. After the Front is repeatedly attacked by Cornelia and eventually wiped out by a sakuradite explosion orchestrated by Lelouch (in an attempt to divert Cornelia's attention, framing their deaths as a suicide), the Four Holy Swords, not knowing that Lelouch killed them, join the Black Knights as the last surviving members. Eventually, most of them are killed as well.

==== Kyoshiro Tohdoh ====
Voiced by: Yūji Takada (Japanese); Steve Blum (English)

Kyoshiro Tohdoh (藤堂 鏡志朗, Tōdō Kyōshirō) is the head of the Black Knights' military operations, and an extremely talented fighter in his own right. He earned the nickname Tohdoh of Miracles (奇跡の藤堂, Kiseki no Tōdō) for his singular defeat of the otherwise undefeated Holy Britannian Empire during the invasion of Japan, managing this feat without the use of Knightmare Frames. This event would later be known as the Miracle of Itsukushima. He was a childhood instructor to Suzaku Kururugi, and is one of the few Japanese people who understands his ideals.

Tohdoh is initially a member of the Japan Liberation Front, and resigns himself to death when the organization is wiped out. Zero convinces him to join the Black Knights in order to fulfill the promise of victory created by the Miracle of Itsukushima. He later leads Black Knight forces in liberation operations throughout the Chinese Federation and the Middle East before being named Chief of Staff of the newly reorganized Black Knights which serve as the national army of the UFN. Asahina's last transmission about Zero's massacre helps fuel his doubts about trusting Zero, which influences him when Schneizel reveals Zero's identity to them. He battles against Suzaku who works as Lelouch's knight, but is defeated. Tohdoh and the remaining Black Knights are made prisoner and later taken away for public execution along with Schneizel and the U.F.N representatives. When Suzaku assassinates Lelouch as the last part of the Zero Requiem, a shocked Tohdoh appears to realize what has happened.

==== Nagisa Chiba ====
Voiced by: Saeko Chiba (Japanese); Laura Bailey (English)

Nagisa Chiba (千葉 凪沙, Chiba Nagisa) is the only female member of the Holy Swords of Kyoto. She is arguably one of the most strong willed and tough characters in the entire show. After Zero leaves during the first Black Rebellion she begins to harbor resentment towards Zero. During the second season she rejoins the Black Knights after being freed By Zero. However she still clearly has trust issues after the first rebellion. After learning about Lelouch and Geass she takes part in the betrayal against him and fight against Lelouch when he takes power. It is hinted she is attracted to Tohdoh.

==== Shōgo Asahina ====
Voiced by: Atsushi Kisaichi (Japanese); Steve Staley (English)

Shōgo Asahina (朝比奈 省悟, Asahina Shōgo) is a male member of the Four Holy Swords. He wears glasses and has a distinctive scar down the right side of his face. He is the leader of the first squadron of the Black Knights and tends to tease Chiba about her crush on Todoh. Like Chiba, he develops a distrust for Zero following the Black Rebellion, questioning his tendency to keep secrets and bring on new members such as Rolo and Jeremiah with no discussion. During the second battle of Tokyo, he is killed in the blast from Nina's F.L.E.I.J.A. bomb, but not before transmitting information about Zero's massacre of the Geass Order to prove Zero can not be trusted.

==== Ryoga Senba ====
Voiced by: Yuu Shimaka (Japanese); Joe Romersa (English)

Ryōga Senba (仙波 崚河, Senba Ryōga) is the oldest member of the Holy Swords of Kyoto and the Black Knights. Like the rest of the Holy Swords he makes his first appearance in episode 9 trying to repel the Britannian attack on the JLF headquarters. Senba, Chiba, Urabe, and Asahina later help to free Tohdoh along with the Black Knights after which they join the group. He was captured after the failed first rebellion rejoining the Black Knights after being freed by Zero. He is killed by Gino in episode 6 of the second season.

==== Kosetsu Urabe ====
Voiced by: Issei Futamata (Japanese); Jason C. Miller (English)

Kosetsu Urabe (卜部 巧雪, Urabe Kōsetsu) is a male member of the Holy Sword of Kyoto and later the Black Knights. He is the first to accept Zero and is one of the few to escape being captured following the failed first rebellion. At the start of Season 2 he is still with the Black Knights and knows about Lelouch's identity, but probably not Geass. When Rolo attacks the Black Knights he sacrifices himself to let his comrades escape.

=== Taizō Kirihara ===
Voiced by: Shinpachi Tsuji (Japanese); Steve Bulen (English)

Taizō Kirihara (桐原 泰三, Kirihara Taizō) is the founder of Kirihara Industries (桐原産業, Kirihara Sangyō) and leader of the Kyōto House. He is an elderly industrialist who built his wealth upon the mining of sakuradite. During the Kururugi administration, he used his considerable influence to support the government as a behind-the-scenes administrator and was even powerful enough to withhold the news of Genbu Kururugi's death for a time from the nation. Kirihara also assigned Tohdoh to be Suzaku's sensei when Suzaku was young. He was regarded as a traitor to the Japanese people following the Britannian invasion for his public role as an accomplice to imperial colonization. Secretly, however, he manages resistance movements against the colonial government. He came to know both Lelouch and Nunnally while they were living at the Kururugi Shrine. When Lelouch reveals his identity to Kirihara, he grants the Black Knights vital funding and weapons. After the Black Rebellion, he is executed for supporting the Black Knights.

=== Kaguya Sumeragi ===
Voiced by: Mika Kanai (Japanese); Stephanie Sheh (English)

Kaguya Sumeragi (皇 神楽耶, Sumeragi Kaguya) is the 14-year-old head mistress of the Kyōto House, and a supporter of the Black Knights. Kaguya is Suzaku's cousin, and met Lelouch and Nunnally during their childhood at the Kururugi Shrine. She is the representative of Sumeragi Concern (皇コンツェルン, Sumeragi Kontserun), a large conglomerate founded by the Sumeragi House. Despite her age and physique, she possesses a strong will and is highly influential amongst the Houses. Kaguya has admired Zero since his debut, and wishes to have his hand in marriage. She claims to be his future wife in the second season, though she admits that they are only husband and wife in name, and even refers to herself, C.C., and Kallen as Zero's harem.

Kaguya is the only living member of Kyōto following the Black Rebellion, having managed to escape to the Chinese Federation until Zero's return one year later while the others were executed. With the formation of the United Federation of Nations, she is made the Supreme Council Chairwoman and the representative of the United States of Japan. After Lelouch installs himself as Emperor the following month, she chairs Britannia's entrance into the U.F.N. She and the others easily see through the fact that Britannia's large population would give it a super majority vote in the U.F.N., effectively giving Lelouch control of the organization, and try to get him to limit his vote. Lelouch instead takes her and everyone else present hostage. However, she is eventually freed with the rest of the hostages. Because of this, she sees Lelouch's true nature. After the final conflict, Kaguya is captured and slated for public execution along with the other leaders of the U.F.N. and the Black Knights. They are all released when Lelouch is killed by Suzaku.

=== Rakshata Chawla ===
Voiced by: Masayo Kurata (Japanese); Laura Bailey (English)

Rakshata Chawla (ラクシャータ・チャウラー, Rakushāta Chaurā; Hindi: राक्शाता चावला) is an Indian scientist who secretly backed the Kyoto Group before becoming the head of the Black Knights' research and development team. She has extensive experience in medical cybernetics, and though she is not fond of speaking of the past, Rakshata is known to have studied at the Imperial Colchester Institute. She is fairly laid back in most situations, usually seen laying on a couch when not actively working, and is never seen without her tobacco pipe. She is visibly enraged, a contrast to her normal demeanor, upon learning that Lloyd and Cécile modified the Guren without her consent. Upon the formation of the UFN and the reorganization of the Black Knights as its military force, Rakshata is designated as the Chief of Science, similar to her previous position within the Black Knights. She reacts to the Black Knights' betrayal of Zero with apathy, more concerned with the aftermath. She is captured and imprisoned along with the rest of the Black Knights after the fall of Schniezel. Rakshata is the creator of the Guren Mk-II and its radiant wave surger (輻射波動, fukushahadō; lit. radiation surge) weapon. She also developed the Gefjun Disturber (ゲフィオンディスターバー, Gefion Disutābā), a force field generator that disables all sakuradite-powered technology within its area of effect. Rakshata also creates the Shinkirō for Zero in season two.

=== Ayame Futaba ===
Voiced by: Fumiko Orikasa (Japanese); Peggy O'Neal (English)

Ayame Futaba (双葉綾芽, Futaba Ayame) is one of the new volunteer members of the Black Knights introduced in the second season. She serves aboard the Ikaruga and appears to run its defensive systems. She wears her hair as a pair of purple mid-length curls.

=== Diethard Ried ===
Voiced by: Jouji Nakata (Japanese); Jamieson Price (English)

Diethard Ried (ディートハルト・リート, Dītoharuto Rīto) is the head of information, espionage, and public relations for the Black Knights. A graduate of the Imperial Britannia Central University's Faculty of Law, Diethard is a former producer and member of the press staff at Hi-TV, a Britannian television station. Following the appearance of Zero and the announcement of his goals, Diethard joins the Black Knights, wishing to witness and document Zero's campaign to overthrow Britannia. He harbors contempt for the Britannian Imperial Family and its supporters, on occasion commenting to Rakshata Chawla that "Britannia is a finished product" and that he would rather take part in creating something new.

Despite possessing some knowledge of who Lelouch is and of his power, Diethard remains loyal. Only when Lelouch is exposed in front of the leaders of the Black Knights does he betray him. He claims that he would rather have watched Zero topple Britannia, but will settle for a hero's death instead. When finding Lelouch proves difficult following his escape, Diethard suggests reporting him as dead, noting that even if Zero came back he would have no credibility without support. He defects to Schneizel following this. When Schneizel is placed under Lelouch's control, Schneizel fatally shoots him in the heart before he could shoot Lelouch.

== Holy Britannian Empire ==
Left to right: Claudio Darlton, Andreas Darlton, Guilford, Cornelia, Euphemia, Suzaku, Lloyd, Cécile, Jeremiah, Villetta, and Kewell.

Flag of the Holy Britannian Empire. Before Japan was conquered by Britannia, it used the same flag used by the real-life Japan and is also used by the Japan Liberation Front as a symbol of resistance against Britannia.

The Holy Britannian Empire (神聖ブリタニア帝国, Shinsei Buritania Teikoku) is an international superpower that controls about one-third of the world at the beginning of the series, increasing to two thirds by the mid-second season. Based in North America, from the imperial city of Pendragon, the territories under Britannian rule include the entire Western Hemisphere, Japan, New Zealand, and parts of the Middle East. Contrary to its name, it does not control the British Isles, having lost them to other European powers during the 19th century. Britannia's flag features the St. George Cross, and crest of arms of a lion and snake intertwined, representing "king" and "death and rebirth", respectively.

=== Britannian Imperial Family ===
Britannia is an absolute monarchy ruled by its Emperor, who traditionally hands out power and administrative control to the members of the imperial family, thus family members usually hold the highest political and military positions within the Empire. The prince and princesses are ordered by number, which is determined by the status of their mothers, the imperial consorts. For example, Clovis is the Third Prince while Lelouch is the Eleventh Prince. The numbering of the imperial princes and princesses is sorted by gender. For example, Euphemia is the Third Princess and Clovis is the Third Prince. The princes and princesses use the same surname prefix as their mother. Members of the imperial family are able to elect a personal guardian called a "Knight", who are given authority and placed directly under their command, with their own unit. Cornelia's Knight is Guilford who, along with her, commands a unit of Gloucesters.

==== Charles zi Britannia ====
Voiced by: Norio Wakamoto (Japanese); Michael McConnohie (English)

Charles zi Britannia (シャルル・ジ・ブリタニア, Sharuru ji Buritania), at first only referred to as The Emperor of Britannia (ブリタニア皇帝, Buritania Kōtei), is Lelouch's father, the 98th Emperor of the Holy Britannian Empire, and the main antagonist of the series. He has 108 different consorts. A strong proponent of Social Darwinism, he views equality as an evil that must be dispelled, and to this end he encourages class conflict and military expansionism so as to maintain social evolution and progress. He also suffered a horrific childhood of his family murdering each other for succession, so he forged a pact with his brother V.V. to create a world without lies. Acquiring allies in Marianne and C.C., Charles created the Sword of Akasha, a weapon designed to facilitate the Ragnarök Connection, remaking the world into a place without lies by killing "God", which is the collective individual unconsciousness of all humankind.

However, when V.V. murdered Marianne and denied his part in her death, Charles was forced to alter the memories of Nunnally before sending her and Lelouch to Japan as political hostages. Since then, the Emperor focused more on his goals while having his remaining children deal with Britannian matters. Eventually after taking V.V.'s code to become immortal, Charles starts up the final preparations of the Ragnarök Connection, revealing the entire truth and that C.C.'s code is the last piece to complete the plan. However, Lelouch sees Charles' ideal world to be nothing more than stagnation that would doom humankind rather than save it, and he uses his Geass to break collective unconsciousness from the connection while having his father dissolve into nothingness. With his last breath, Charles warns Lelouch his rejection of the world he envisioned would only allow Schneizel's to become a reality.

==== Marianne vi Britannia ====
Voiced by: Asako Dodo (Japanese); Kari Wahlgren (English)

Marianne vi Britannia (マリアンヌ・ヴィ・ブリタニア, Mariannu vi Buritania) is the fifth wife of Charles, Emperor of Britannia, and the mother of Lelouch and Nunnally, titled the 98th Empress of the Holy Britannian Empire. Despite being a commoner, she was the only one of Charles' wives that he actually loved. She is nicknamed "Marianne the Flash" for her piloting skills, having been the test pilot for the Ganymede Knightmare Frame with the support of the Ashford Foundation, which was then a contender in the development of the first Knightmare Frame prototypes. When Lelouch was a child, she was assassinated by a stream of bullets within the Aries Imperial Villa, purportedly by terrorists, and the culprits were never found; Nunnally was also paralyzed by the same bullets, and her and Lelouch's subsequent exile led the latter to assume that Charles was involved with the murder.

It is eventually revealed that the culprit was V.V., who killed Marianne in the middle of the night out of seeing her as a hindrance to their plan, as well as out of jealousy for the attention Charles paid to her. He then arranged a cover up with Nunnally as a witness. However, Marianne made a pact with C.C. prior, giving her a Geass ability that allowed her to project her consciousness onto people's minds. She activated it as she was dying, transferring her mind into the body of the witness Anya Alstreim. From there, Marianne contacted C.C. via a form of telepathy, though the viewer only hears C.C.'s side of the conversation. When Charles begins the final steps of his plan, Marianne takes control over Anya's body to take herself and C.C. to Kamine Island. Once there, Marianne discards her host and returns to her original body to aid Charles in triggering Ragnarök as they planned. However, she dissolves when Lelouch destroys the connection and turns the world's collective unconsciousness on her and Charles, thereby truly dying.

==== Odysseus eu Britannia ====
Voiced by: Jin Yamanoi (Japanese); Peter Emshwiller (English)

Odysseus eu Britannia (オデュッセウス・ウ・ブリタニア, Odyusseusu u Buritania) is the First Prince of the Holy Britannian Empire. Though he is the Crown Prince and first in line to succeed the throne, his performance in many areas is quite plebeian compared to that of his younger siblings. He also appears to be fairly indecisive, unable to figure out what to do in the face of the Black Knights' open rebellion in Area 11. He is described as mediocre.

In the second season, he is engaged to Tianzi, the much younger Empress of the Chinese Federation, in a marriage of political convenience orchestrated by Schneizel in order to peacefully seize the Federation's territory. When the marriage fails as a result of a coup d'etat instigated by Li Xingke and furthered by the Black Knights, Odysseus is not offended by the broken engagement. Instead, he shows more concern regarding the continuing war with the E.U. and is reluctant to begin hostilities with the Chinese Federation while engaging in the E.U. campaign. Lelouch uses his Geass to compel Odysseus, along with the rest of the royal court, to accept him as the new emperor. Afterward, he is recruited into the Britannian military as a regular foot soldier.

==== Schneizel el Britannia ====
Voiced by: Norihiro Inoue (Japanese); Troy Baker (English)

Schneizel el Britannia (シュナイゼル・エル・ブリタニア, Shunaizeru eru Buritania) is the Second Prince of the Holy Britannian Empire and the Prime Minister of Britannia. Though he appears only a few times in the first season, he serves as the primary antagonist in the last part of the second season. Schneizel is a strategist on par with Lelouch, as he is the only person whom Lelouch was unable to beat in chess as a child. Schneizel is ruthless and cold, willing to sacrifice lives, innocent or not, without a second thought to achieve his ends. In R2 he arranges a marriage between Odysseus and Tianzi, as a way to annex the Chinese Federation without shedding a single drop of blood. Conversely, he is seemingly very charismatic and caring toward his subordinates. When Lelouch becomes Britannia's 99th Emperor, Schneizel, alongside the Black Knights and other soldiers opposing Lelouch, confront him, with Schneizel planning to take the throne from there. However, Schneizel is defeated and Lelouch uses his Geass on him to make him follow Zero's orders. He is present at the Zero Requiem as a prisoner and remains under this Geass (now following Suzaku) even after Lelouch's death.

==== Cornelia li Britannia ====
Voiced by: Junko Minagawa (Japanese); Mary Elizabeth McGlynn (English)

Cornelia li Britannia (コーネリア・リ・ブリタニア, Kōneria ri Buritania) is the Second Princess of the Holy Britannian Empire and Commander-in-Chief of the Imperial Army. Extremely skilled in Knightmare Frame combat, she establishes Britannian rule in the Middle Eastern Area 18 shortly before her appointment as Viceroy of Area 11 following Clovis's death. She has a strong distrust of foreigners, even those with Honorary Britannian status, and prefers to win without their help. Though she is decisive and straightforward in most situations, she has a soft spot for her sister Euphemia, such that she prioritizes Euphemia's safety over the completion of her objectives. Her personal Knight is Gilbert G.P. Guilford, who commands the Glaston Knights.

Upon arriving in Area 11, Cornelia launches a military campaign against Zero's Black Knights and the other rebel factions, crushing all but the Black Knights. After Euphemia's death, she learns that Zero is Lelouch. In the aftermath of the Rebellion, Cornelia is labeled MIA by Britannia, as she goes underground to expose the existence of Geass in order to clear Euphemia's name. However, upon infiltrating the Geass Order and learning of her father's ties to it, Cornelia is captured by V.V. until the Black Knights' assault on the Order allow her to break out of her cell. Following V.V.'s death, she is taken prisoner by Lelouch, but manages to escape in the aftermath of the Second Battle of Tokyo, joining Schneizel when he arrives as an envoy and telling him everything she learned relating to the Geass Order.

She joins his faction in Cambodia after Lelouch becomes Emperor. When she learns of Schneizel's plan to position the Damocles in such a way that it could strike all over the world at the same time, she tries to stop him, only to be gunned down. She is taken from the Damocles to Horai Island, where she is treated for her wounds. Two months later, after the culmination of Lelouch's plans, she is shown leading a small resistance group. They take advantage of Lelouch's assassination to restore order. She is not present in the manga adaption, with the position of Viceroy going to her sister, Euphemia.

==== Clovis la Britannia ====
Voiced by: Nobuo Tobita (Japanese); Sam Riegel (English)

Clovis la Britannia (クロヴィス・ラ・ブリタニア, Kurovisu ra Buritania) is the Third Prince of the Holy Britannian Empire and former Viceroy of Area 11. He is timid and narcissistic, as well as unaccustomed to failure. He and Lelouch would often play chess during their childhood; despite consistently losing, Clovis viewed Lelouch as a friendly rival. He went to Area 11 in honor of Lelouch. Clovis was apparently involved in the research on C.C. and others like her, and he feared that his involvement might get him disowned were it made public. When C.C.'s capsule is stolen by Japanese resistance fighters under the mistaken belief that it contains poison gas, Clovis is quick to order the eradication of the Shinjuku ghetto to disguise his secret project. Once Lelouch is given the power of Geass, he organizes the resistance to defeat Clovis's forces and confront his brother, killing him after extracting what little information Clovis has about his mother's death.

==== Euphemia li Britannia ====
Voiced by: Omi Minami (Japanese); Michelle Ruff (English)

Euphemia li Britannia (ユーフェミア・リ・ブリタニア, Yūfemia ri Buritania) is Lelouch's half-sister and the Third Princess of the Holy Britannian Empire. She is a kindhearted and open-minded woman who despises conflict in any form. She is also a very optimistic person unlike many of her siblings. Unlike her brother Lelouch, she is a pacifist and in many ways Suzaku's female counterpart; however, she is also the closest sibling to Nunnally and Lelouch, who once admits to Euphemia that she was his "first love". Euphemia joins her older sister Cornelia in governing Area 11, becoming the Sub-Viceroy. In the process, she meets Suzaku and begins a relationship with him after he becomes her Knight, or bodyguard. Toward the end of the first season, she deduces Lelouch's identity but after getting marooned with him for two days also ends up discovering his plans for change. Wanting to help Zero and instill trust in him for the civilian populace, she announces her intent to form the Special Administrative Zone of Japan in the region under Mount Fuji, giving the Japanese people their name and country back, and govern it alongside Zero. During the administration changeover ceremony, she falls under the accidental influence of Lelouch's Geass, and is reluctantly compelled to kill the Japanese people. She is fatally shot in the stomach by Zero to end the chaos and dies from her injuries unaware of what has happened, sparking the Black Rebellion and provoking Suzaku to desire to kill Zero, who himself is grieving over what he had to do. Britannia officially declares Euphemia responsible for the massacre, and she comes to be known as the "Massacre Princess" (虐殺皇女, Gyakusatsu Kōjo; "Princess Massacre" in the English dubs) to the general public. Once Lelouch becomes Emperor, he intends to shed enough blood to make the name of Princess Massacre be forgotten, allowing his culpability for the event to become exposed in order to direct the hatred of the entire world upon himself.

=== Knights of the Round ===
The Knights of the Round, from left to right: Luciano Bradley (top), Anya Alstreim (bottom), Suzaku Kururugi, Gino Weinberg, Monica Kruszewski, Bismarck Waldstein, and Nonette Enneagram. Dorothea Ernst is absent.

The Knights of the Round (ナイトオブラウンズ, Naito Obu Raunzu) is a unit of twelve elite soldiers under the direct command of the Britannian Emperor himself, each holding a rank from one to twelve. They operate outside the normal command structure of the Britannian Military, and take orders only from the Emperor. The Knights of the Round each pilot a unique Knightmare, maintained by a personal support unit. All of the Knights of the Round's Knightmares are named after the Knights of the Round Table. Knights of the Round are treated as nobility within the Empire. Their ranks do not seem to have any particular bearing on their skill level or dominance over other Knights, except for the Knight of One, who is universally acknowledged as the strongest warrior in the Holy Britannian Empire. The Knight of One may request governance of an Area of his choice from the Emperor. Only eight of the twelve seats are filled (as the Code Geass novels explain).

In R2, Suzaku Kururugi is inducted into the Knights of the Round, as the Knight of Seven. Marianne vi Britannia was also the Knight of Six prior to her apparent death. Also of note is that, in the Renya of Darkness manga (set in the 1860s), there existed a Knight of Thirteen, Barbaros.

==== Bismarck Waldstein ====
Voiced by: Soumei Uchida (TV series~Glorification),Takanori Hoshino(Responsibilities from 2022 onwards) (Japanese); Lex Lang (English)

Bismarck Waldstein (ビスマルク・ヴァルトシュタイン, Bisumaruku Varutoshutain) is a man who bears the title of the Knight of One under Charles, the strongest amongst the Knights of the Round, having previously been the Knight of Five. He pilots the Knightmare Frame Galahad, and keeps his left eye sewn shut. Despite his status and combat abilities, he believes that war should be used as a last resort, and also sees strength without restraint as needless violence. Following the death of the Emperor and Lelouch's accession to the throne, Bismarck leads three of the remaining Knights of the Round and a squadron of Knightmares in an attempt to remove Lelouch from power. Bismarck opens his hidden eye and reveals his Geass, which allows him to see a few seconds into the future. However, he is killed in combat by Suzaku.

==== Gino Weinberg ====
Voiced by: Sōichirō Hoshi (Japanese); Dave Wittenberg (English)

Gino Weinberg (ジノ・ヴァインベルグ, Jino Vainberugu) is the Knight of Three, a seventeen-year-old ace pilot of noble descent. Gino comes from a very wealthy upbringing, and as such does not quite understand how the real world works. However, his cheerfulness and friendly demeanor earn him many friends. He is very good friends with Suzaku and Anya; the cause being close in age. He pilots the transformable Knightmare Frame Tristan. He enrolls in Ashford Academy with Anya to learn what it is like to live as a regular person.

After Lelouch becomes Emperor, he joins the assault to remove him from power. Suzaku disables the Tristan without killing Gino, leaving him to question what he is fighting for if he intends to fight the very country that he swore to fight for. After the Black Knights join Schneizel in order to defeat Lelouch, Gino offers his aid to them. He engages Suzaku in combat, refusing to accept the new Britannia and ending their friendship, but is defeated. After Kallen narrowly defeats Suzaku, losing consciousness and leaving her Guren completely inoperable in the process, Gino manages to catch her as she falls. After the battle, he is scheduled for execution along with many others who rebelled against Lelouch and is subsequently saved due to the latter's assassination. In an OVA, it is revealed that he still attended Ashford Academy.

==== Dorothea Ernst ====
Voiced by: Kikuko Inoue (Japanese); Peggy O'Neal (English)

Dorothea Ernst (ドロテア・エルンスト, Dorotea Erunsuto) is the Knight of Four. She is described as being as heroic as Bismarck. She joins Bismarck and the other Rounds members against Lelouch but is the first to be killed by Suzaku in the Lancelot Albion.

==== Anya Alstreim ====
Voiced by: Yūko Gotō (Japanese); Stephanie Sheh (English)

Anya Alstreim (アーニャ・アールストレイム, Ā'nya Ārusutoreimu) is the Knight of Six, a girl of few expressions and lacking in common sense. She pilots the heavy assault Knightmare Frame, Mordred. Anya appears uninterested in the world around her, and appears to have little motivation where anything other than combat is concerned. She holds the distinction of being the youngest individual ever appointed to the Knights of the Round at the age of 15, and she shares a friendship with the similarly young Suzaku and Gino.

Seeking to be remembered, Anya regularly uses her camera phone to update her blog. She does this because she does not trust her own memories, as she has a nine-year-old diary which she does not remember writing, as well as other diary and blog entries that do not match up with her memories. The reason behind Anya's inconsistent memories is that as an apprentice for proper etiquette at the Aries Palace, she unwittingly became the sole witness of Marianne's murder by V.V., the former using her Geass to conceal her consciousness within Anya and the Emperor later using his own to alter Anya's memories and conceal the truth. She is sent to Area 11 along with Suzaku and Gino in the second season's premier. When facing Lelouch's forces, she confronts Jeremiah Gottwald. He realizes that she is under the influence of Geass and uses his Geass Canceler to restore her memories. She later becomes one of the rebels who are taken to public execution by Lelouch, but is released after his death. In the epilogue, she and Jeremiah are seen tending to an orange farm together.

==== Nonette Enneagram ====
Voiced by: Satomi Arai

Nonette Enneagram (ノネット・エニアグラム, Nonetto Eniaguramu) is the Knight of Nine. She attended military school with Second Princess Cornelia, who considers Nonette her senior. An upbeat and cheerful woman, she is one of the few people Cornelia actually fears. Her first and last names contain the Latin and Greek prefixes for 9, non- and ennea- respectively. Her last name may also be a reference to the Enneagram of Personality. She mainly appears in the PSP/PS2 video game, Code Geass: Lost Colors, her only speaking role.

==== Luciano Bradley ====
Voiced by: Atsushi Kisaichi (Japanese); Vic Mignogna (English)

Luciano Bradley (ルキアーノ・ブラッドリー, Rukiāno Buraddorī) is the Knight of Ten and is known as the "Vampire of Britannia". A violent and confrontational man, he is fond of antagonizing others and attacking without provocation; several of the Knights of the Round appear to dislike him. He shows little care for the lives he ends, be they friend or foe, as long as he can cause destruction. In fact, he fights battles specifically because it allows him to freely kill people in public, even attempting to sacrifice his allies for a fleeting tactical advantage. Though fiercely loyal to the Empire, he does as he pleases most of the time, even around members of the Imperial family. He pilots the Knightmare Frame Percival. Kallen kills him after she finishes off all four of the Valkyrie pilots during the Second Battle of Tokyo.

==== Monica Kruszewski ====
Voiced by: Yūko Gotō (Japanese); Dorothy Fahn (English)

Monica Kruszewski (モニカ・クルシェフスキー, Monika Kurushefusukī) is the Knight of Twelve and a gentle-looking woman. She is stationed aboard the Emperor's flagship, the Great Britannia. During the attack on Kaminejima, the Emperor leaves her to deal with Schneizel and the Black Knights. She is killed by Suzaku during an attempt to remove Lelouch from power.

=== Valkyrie Squadron ===
The Valkyrie Squadron was an elite Britannian division under the command of the Knight of Ten, Luciano Bradley. Its members pilot Vincents in a custom light pink/dark pink paint scheme. Two of its members include Marika Soresi (マリーカ・ソレイシィ, Marīka Sorēshī), sister of the late Kewell Soresi, and her close friend, Liliana Vergamon (リーライナ・ヴェルガモン, Rīraina Berugamon). Both of them were soldiers once under Princess Cornelia's command and originally appeared in Code Geass's novelisation as new characters to act as foils to elaborate Cornelia. Despite not appearing in Code Geass's first season, they were added as members of the Valkyrie Squad as a nod towards the novels.

In the series, they serve alongside Luciano at the Battle of Kagoshima, wherein they eliminate an entire Black Knights ambush force at Nagasaki, and at the Second Battle of Tokyo, once more at Luciano's side. In that battle, they are instrumental in capturing Zero, and almost succeed in killing him in tandem with Luciano. However, Kallen ultimately interferes in the stolen Guren Seiten, and strikes down all four members of the unit in one swift motion, freeing Zero and killing the quartet (save Marika) in the process.

=== Britannian Army ===
The largest military in the world, Britannia's armed forces are the primary antagonists of the series, divided into many hundreds of ground troops, Knightmare frames, Hoverships and specialized Knight groups. Zero's constant harassment of the military have earned him many personal enemies, and several researchers, soldiers and commanders have become significant characters.

==== Bartley Asprius ====
Voiced by: Katsuhisa Hōki (Japanese); Peter Spellos (English)

Bartley Asprius (バトレー・アスプリウス, Batorē Asupuriusu) is a portly and balding Britannian general who commands the Code R research team. After the assassination of Clovis, he is stripped of his rank by Jeremiah and sent back to Britannia as a prisoner. He subsequently returns to the military under the command of Prince Schneizel. He oversees Jeremiah Gottwald's transformation into a cyborg and tries in vain to stop Jeremiah when he wakes up prematurely. After V.V. recruits Jeremiah, Bartley is ordered by the Emperor to help finish Jeremiah's modifications, which he does not seem happy about. After completing his task, he expresses his desire to leave, knowing that the Emperor's plans could mean the end of the world. During the Black Knights' assault on the Geass Order stronghold, Bartley is killed in the attack. Before his demise, he sees C.C. and laments to the deceased Prince Clovis that they should never have captured her.

==== Andreas Darlton ====
Voiced by: Kiyoyuki Yanada (Japanese); Travis Willingham (English)

Andreas Darlton (アンドレアス・ダールトン, Andoreasu Dāruton) is a confidante and loyal subordinate to the Second Princess Cornelia. Darlton is an extremely tall, well-built man with a diagonal scar running across his face. He does not particularly care for the rampant racism that plagues the Britannian military, and makes it clear to Suzaku that effectiveness in serving a purpose is equivalent to merit in his eyes. He is also one of the few Britannians who actually approve of Suzaku's accession to knighthood. He is wounded attempting to prevent Euphemia's massacre, and later is put under the influence of Lelouch's Geass as part of a plan to capture Cornelia. During the Battle of Tokyo, Darlton disables Cornelia's Knightmare Frame and is subsequently killed by the Gawain's Hadron Cannons. In the Code Geass picture book 8.75, Darlton is revealed to have multiple adopted sons, five of whom became the Glaston Knights.

==== Jeremiah "Orange" Gottwald ====
Voiced by: Ken Narita (Japanese); Crispin Freeman (English)

Jeremiah Gottwald (ジェレミア・ゴットバルト, Jeremia gottobaruto) is an elite Knightmare Frame pilot deeply concerned with the maintenance of Purist supremacy within Britannian society. He is somewhat overconfident and passionate about furthering his goals, both qualities that tend to make him rash and impulsive in battle. He was formerly a part of Empress Marianne's guard, and he is deeply affected after failing to stop her assassination. Jeremiah is further disgraced after failing to get Suzaku Kururugi to his trial when Lelouch, as Zero, uses his Geass to compel Jeremiah to help them escape. Lelouch hides his Geass by pretending to blackmail Jeremiah using his connection to "orange", a conspiracy that does not actually exist. Rumors of Jeremiah's connections to "orange" lead to his demotion and even an attempted assassination by his own men (only to be saved by Suzaku and Euphemia), and eventually causing him to believe that killing Zero will restore his honor. His impatient and impulsive action when trying to find Zero leads to his quick defeat at the hands of Kallen Stadtfeld, who has recently acquired the Guren Mk-II, when he tries to fight Zero at the Battle of Narita. He is officially listed as killed in action after this because everything suggesting otherwise was lost along with his Knightmare's signal. In reality, Jeremiah manages to escape and staggers on to the street, where he is found by scientists. Jeremiah is subjected to a number of experiments by the scientists, now under Prince Schneizel's patronage, who enhance his body with various cybernetic devices, such as a neural interface and a cybernetic left eye. The latter also comes with the Geass Canceler, a blue, inverted form of the Geass with about the same capabilities as Rolo's Geass that nullifies any effects done onto a person by the Geass, thereby making them able to experience Geass again but also allowing them to no longer feel its previous effects.

As the Black Knights take over of China is nearly complete, Jeremiah is sent to Japan by V.V. to eliminate Lelouch. However, while confronting Lelouch in a train station and resisting the Gefjun Disturber trap laid out for him, Jeremiah reveals he had a hidden motive for coming, demanding to know the reason why Lelouch became Zero and betrayed their people. When Lelouch reveals his true name and intent to avenge his mother's death, Jeremiah swears his loyalty to Lelouch in order to redeem his failure to protect Marianne by revealing the location of the Geass Order and aiding in its destruction. In the end, he assists in the Zero Requiem and retires as, ironically, a content orange farmer along with Anya.

==== Gilbert G.P. Guilford ====
Voiced by: Yoshiyuki Kono (Japanese); Roger Craig Smith (English)

Gilbert G.P. Guilford (ギルバート・G・P・ギルフォード, Girubāto. G. P. Girufōdo) is bespectacled man who was once known as the "Spearhead of the Empire". He is a confidante and personal knight to the Second Princess Cornelia (who he's in love with), and commands her Glaston Knights. Though he initially pilots a Gloucester, he switches to the more advanced Vincent model in the second season. In the first-season finale, he aids in putting down the Black Rebellion with the help of the Glaston Knights. Following Cornelia's disappearance during the rebellion, he remains in Area 11, dutifully awaiting her return. After Viceroy Carales is killed in the second season, Guilford serves as a temporary replacement. During the battle for Japan, Lelouch uses his Geass to make Guilford believe that he is actually Cornelia, turning Guilford to his side; however, this causes Guilford to eventually sacrifice himself to save Lelouch from the FLEIJA explosion. He later manages to reunite with Cornelia after somehow escaping.

==== Glaston Knights ====
- Alfred: Voiced by: Ryuzo Hasuike (Japanese); Darrel Guilbeau (English)
- Bart: Voiced by: Noriaki Sugiyama (Japanese); David Markus (English)
- Claudio: Voiced by: Yasuyuki Kase (Japanese); Sam Riegel (English)
- David: Voiced by: Soichiro Hoshi (Japanese); Bryce Papenbrook (English)
- Edgar: Voiced by: Mitsuaki Madono (Japanese); Bryce Papenbrook (English)

Named in part for Glastonbury Tor in Arthurian legend, the Glaston Knights are a group of elite Knightmare Frame pilots under the command of Gilbert G.P. Guilford. All five are the adopted sons of Andreas Darlton; their names are Alfred G. Darlton, Bart L. Darlton, Claudio S. Darlton, David T. Darlton, and Edgar N. Darlton. They dress in identical red uniforms and wear visors resembling the faceplate on Gloucesters. The Glaston Knights pilot Gloucesters equipped with missile launchers, but switch to the newer Gareth models prior to the Black Knights' attack on Japan. Their middle initials spell out the consonants of the word 'Glaston'.

The Glaston Knights are introduced in episode 21, having just arrived from the mainland, and are instrumental in defeating the Black Knights during their attempted rebellion in the first-season finale. In the second season, Alfred and Bart are killed during an attempted execution of the Black Knights captured during the rebellion; Bart's Gloucester is crushed by a G-1 Mobile Base, while Kallen kills Alfred. In the same skirmish, Lelouch uses his Geass on David to stage an attack on Rolo. David and Edgar are killed during the second battle of Tokyo by Chiba (with assistance from Kallen) and Tohdoh respectively. Claudio escapes when the F.L.E.I.J.A. bomb detonates, making him the only surviving member.

==== Kanon Maldini ====
Voiced by: Kōzō Mito (Japanese); Adam Bobrow (English)

Kanon Maldini (カノン・マルディーニ, Kanon Marudīni) is a subordinate of Schneizel el Britannia, serving as a political and military adviser who went to school with Schneizel and Lloyd. While celebrating Tianzi's marriage to Prince Odysseus, he makes a joke to Milly Ashford about being Schneizel's assistant in both public and private matters, only to wave it off shortly thereafter.

Kanon follows Suzaku to the Kururugi Temple in order to capture Zero; while there, he obtains conclusive evidence not only of the masked terrorist's identity, but also of the existence of Geass. This evidence proves essential in convincing the leaders of the Black Knights to betray Zero. When Schneizel decides to stage a coup d'état, Kanon notes that he's finally made the decision, but seems apprehensive about it. During the battle above Mount Fuji, he is appalled by Schneizel's decision to use the F.L.E.I.J.A. warhead to destroy the Damocles as a means of killing Lelouch; he is also surprised by Schneizel's willingness to sacrifice Nunnally. He is taken captive by a Britannian officer under the control of Geass, and he looks on as Schneizel himself is taken under control by Lelouch. He is present when Lelouch announces his intention to control the world, and he is last seen being taken to execution along with the others who rebelled against Lelouch.

==== Villetta Nu ====
Voiced by: Akeno Watanabe (Japanese); Megan Hollingshead (English)

Villetta Nu (ヴィレッタ・ヌゥ, Viretta Nū) is an elite Knightmare Frame pilot and subordinate of Jeremiah Gottwald, though she is more collected than Jeremiah in battle. She is not of noble blood, but she supports Jeremiah and the Purebloods because she believes she can earn a title of nobility through them.

Shortly after gaining the power of Geass, Lelouch uses it to make Villetta relinquish her Knightmare to him, leaving her confused about what happened. Though she dismisses it at first, she begins to suspect Lelouch after Jeremiah experiences similar memory loss after odd behavior. When Jeremiah is supposedly killed during the Battle of Narita, Villetta steps up her attempts to find the connection between Lelouch and Zero with the help of Shirley Fenette. After discovering that Lelouch is Zero, Shirley shoots Villetta to protect Lelouch, giving Villetta amnesia. She is found by Kaname Ohgi, with whom she lives for a time. He names her Chigusa (チグサ) since she cannot remember her real name. The two fall in love, but after unexpectedly regaining her memory at the end of the season, Villetta is disgusted at the thought that she ever loved an Eleven. She confronts him during the Black Rebellion and reveals her true identity, then shoots him in the stomach. This, however, does not kill him.

In the second season, her knowledge of Zero's identity and of his Geass has earned her a title of nobility. She is employed by Britannian Intelligence to observe Lelouch for contact with C.C. at Ashford Academy, using the cover identity of a gym teacher. Villetta still seems to have feelings for Ohgi, breathing a sigh of relief when he is saved from his execution before quickly regaining her normal composure. After discovering their previous relationship, Lelouch uses the knowledge to blackmail her into hiding the fact he has recovered his memories. When Lelouch leaves to attack the Geass Order, Villetta goes to the Chinese Federation to confront Ohgi, intending to kill him to eliminate her links to the Elevens. She hesitates when Ohgi admits he loves her. She is captured after an altercation with Sayoko, but is eventually released and leads Ohgi to believe Zero cannot be trusted. She remains with the Black Knights following this. It is revealed that she is pregnant with Ohgi's child and at the end of the series, she is married to Ohgi. Even though she doesn't earn the title of nobility, she earns the title as the prime minister's wife and a mother.

In the manga adaptation of the series, Villetta doesn't appear until the second season storyline, and, unlike the anime, she does not have a relationship with Ohgi. Instead of Villetta, it is Jeremiah who is shot by Shirley. Also, since Knightmares didn't exist, Villetta was given a different Geass command by Lelouch: to look over at him and Rolo's irregular things. Also, Villetta is the one possessed by Marianne vi Britannia instead of Anya Alstreim. Conversely, in the recap film canon, Villetta has an identical arc to her mainstream counterpart, but is shot by Diethard instead of Shirley due to the latter never losing her father.

==== Kewell Soresi ====
Voiced by: Yasuyuki Kase (Japanese); Keith Silverstein (English)

Kewell Soresi (キューエル・ソレイシィ, Kyūeru Sorēshī) is an officer of the Britannian Army. Kewell belongs to the Purebloods and stands by Jeremiah's side in scapegoating Suzaku Kururugi. When Jeremiah's incomprehensible actions lead to Suzaku's escape with Zero, he leads the rest of the Purebloods in an unsuccessful attempt to kill Jeremiah. He is later unceremoniously killed by Kallen in the Battle of Narita. He has a younger sister named Marika (マリーカ) who has a cameo appearance as one of the Valkyrie Squadron pilots in the second season and is also killed by Kallen; her story (and by extension, Kewell's) is expanded in Code Geass: OZ the Reflection.

=== Others ===
==== Lloyd Asplund ====
Voiced by: Tetsu Shiratori (Japanese); Liam O'Brien (English)

Lloyd Asplund (ロイド・アスプルンド, Roido Asupurundo) is an earl of the Britannian nobility and the head of the scientific research team Camelot, which is responsible for the development of the elite Knightmare Frame Lancelot. He has a tendency to mock others and is often rebuked for this behavior by Cécile Croomy, his assistant. Prior to joining the military, he attended high school with Schneizel and Kanon, and later the Imperial Colchester Institute with Jeremiah. Lloyd's research organization, Camelot (キャメロット), is an irregular division of the Britannian Military that has permission from Prince Schneizel to operate outside the command structure and regulations of the regular Britannian armed forces. Rakshata refers to Lloyd as the Earl of Pudding (プリン伯爵, Purin Hakushaku), as pudding is his favorite food. He is engaged to Milly Ashford in the first season, having agreed to the union mostly in the hope that he might obtain the designs of the Knightmare Frame Ganymede. Milly breaks off the engagement after she graduates in order to become more true to herself. Towards the conclusion of the series, he willingly joins Lelouch's new regime. He works with Nina and Cécile to create a countermeasure to F.L.E.I.J.A. and assists Sayoko during the rescue of the hostages on board the Avalon according to Lelouch's orders so they are spared from the repercussions of his actions.

==== Cécile Croomy ====
Voiced by: Kikuko Inoue (Japanese); Deborah Sale Butler (English)

Cécile Croomy (セシル・クルーミー, Seshiru Kurūmī) is Lloyd's subordinate in Camelot and one of the Lancelot's developers. She is a capable scientist in her own right, having designed the energy wing system used on the Guren Seiten and the Lancelot Albion, and also a capable Knightmare Frame pilot. Prior to joining Lloyd in the military, she studied at the Imperial Colchester Institute. A kind-hearted woman and a good friend to Suzaku, Cécile often helps him with homework. She also acts as Lloyd's conscience, not hesitating to scold him or physically punish him for his unintentionally rude remarks or treating Suzaku as a "part" of a machine. Following Lelouch's accession to the throne, she willingly joins Lelouch's new regime. C.C. deduces that Cécile's reason for doing so was because she had fallen in love with Suzaku, Lelouch's Knight of Zero. A recurring joke that Cécile is a bad cook, though no one who eats it (e.g. Lloyd) points that out to her.

==== Alicia Lohmeyer ====
Voiced by: Akeno Watanabe (Japanese); Dorothy Elias-Fahn (English)

Alicia Lohmeyer (アリシア・ローマイヤ, Arishia Rōmaiya) is an aide and advisor assigned by Britannia to observe Nunnally upon her appointment as the new Viceroy of Area 11. A quintessential Britannian, she regards Nunnally's pro-Eleven political stance with frigid opposition, but dutifully obeys regardless. When Zero engineers the exile of one million Japanese during a second attempt at forming the Special Administrative Zone of Japan, she nearly starts a second massacre by firing upon the crowd; Suzaku disarms her to prevent it from happening again. She becomes more resentful as Nunnally begins to assert herself in the workings of the government, and even orders Kallen's execution while Nunnally is being evacuated from the second battle of Tokyo. Alicia dies when the decoy ship she entered is consumed in the blast from the F.L.E.I.J.A. bomb.

== Chinese Federation ==
Flag of the Chinese Federation.

The Chinese Federation is an imperial monarchy that spans the Asian and Pacific regions, including parts of South Asia, and the majority of Southeast Asia. Its political structure and organization appears to resemble Imperial China. The Emperor of the Federation was formerly an office that held absolute political power, but it has since been reduced to an effectively symbolic figurehead posting, "a symbol of the state and the unity of the people". As with the Emperor of Japan, the individual who holds the title is regarded as a living divinity whose sovereignty is entirely ceremonial. True control of the nation lies with the governmental organization known as the "High Eunuchs" (大宦官, Daikangan; pinyin: Dà Huàn'guān). Following the overthrow of the Eunuchs, the Chinese Federation becomes part of the newly formed United Federation of Nations, renaming itself the United States of China.

=== Li Xingke ===
Voiced by: Hikaru Midorikawa (Japanese); David Vincent (English)

Li Xingke (黎星刻（リー・シンクー）, Rī Shinkū; pinyin: Lí Xīngkè) is a military officer in the Chinese Federation, said to equal Lelouch in strategy and Suzaku in strength; however, he is limited by a deadly disease that causes him hemoptysis. The son of a low-ranked official, Li climbed his way through the ranks of the government with the intent to transform it. He is fiercely loyal to the young Empress of the Chinese Federation; his devotion stems from when she insisted on sparing his life when he was supposed to be executed for giving medicine to a prisoner. Years later, he was forced to leave the Forbidden City to attend a military academy, but promised the Empress that he would fulfill her wish to see the world beyond the Forbidden City. Xingke is extremely skilled in swordsmanship and constantly carries a sword by his side. He also pilots the Shen Hu Knightmare Frame.

Li Xingke arrives in Area 11 as a bodyguard to the Federation's consul, Gao Hai. When Gao Hai, under the influence of Lelouch's Geass, declares loyalty foremost to Zero rather than the Empress, Li kills him for committing lèse-majesté. C.C. realizes his ambitions, and that his agreement to aid the Black Knights is to use the Black Knights to further own plans for China. With a marriage of convenience set up for Prince Odysseus of Britannia and the Empress, Li stages a coup d'état that is interrupted by Zero taking the Empress hostage and escaping. For the sake of Tianzi, he allies with Zero, who engineers a general uprising within the Chinese Federation. The High Eunuchs lose their support from Britannian forces, and Li personally executes all of the High Eunuchs for treason on the spot.

After the United Federation of Nations is formed, Li is appointed as Commander-in-Chief of the Black Knights and leads the initial attack on the Kagoshima coastline as a distraction for the infiltration of Tokyo Bay, engaging the Knight of One in combat. After Lelouch becomes Emperor and takes the U.F.N. council hostage, Li is forced to concede command of the Black Knights to Prince Schneizel in order to ensure that the hostages on board the Avalon are not killed. Once Lelouch has control of the Damocles, Li is arrested along with the rest of the U.F.N. representatives but is freed after Lelouch's death.

=== High Eunuchs ===
The High Eunuchs are a group of eight men who use the Empress' power to control the Federation, leaving its people poor and starving while they live in opulence. All eight are executed for lèse majesté against the Empress by Li Xingke, though not all at the same time.

The first Eunuch introduced is Gāo Hài (高亥（ガオ・ハイ）; voiced by Nobuaki Sekine/Dave Wittenberg), a pale-skinned and young-looking man who is sent as the Federation's consul to Area 11. Under the influence of Lelouch's Geass, he grants asylum to the Black Knights within the grounds of the Federation's consulate. Li Xingke executes him when he claims Zero is more important than the Empress.

The other seven are introduced after the Black Knights are exiled, plotting to give up much of the Federation's territory to Britannia in exchange for being made nobles. They are Zhào Hào (趙皓（ジャオ・ハオウ）, Jao Haou), the only overweight member and the only one with a unique skin-tone; Xià Wàng (夏望（シャ・ワン）, Sha Wan), a tall man with light-brown skin that wears glasses; Chéng Zhōng (程忠（チェン・ジョン）, Chen Jon), a short, older-looking man; Xiàng Shèng (項勝（シャン・シェン）, Shan Shen), another pale-skinned man somewhat shorter than Gao Hai but apparently around the same age; Cài Lì Shì (蔡力士（サイ・リ・シ）, Sai Ri Shi), a shorter man with light-brown skin and a few wrinkles; Tóng Lún (童倫（トン・ルン）, Ton Run), a man around the same height as Sha Wang but with paler skin; and Huáng Qiān (黄遷（フアン・シェン）, Fuan Shen), the oldest of the group with a prominent chin and many wrinkles. They attempt to kill the current Tianzi and install a puppet Emperor in her place after her kidnapping by Zero, but they are tricked into admitting their deception to the public, causing a civilian uprising. Once they are abandoned by the Britannians for losing the faith of their people, Li kills them.

=== Jiang Lihua (Tianzi) ===
Voiced by: Tamaki Matsumoto (TV series), Saori Sudō (films) (Japanese); Jessica Straus (English)

Jiang Lihua (蒋麗華（チェン・リーファ）, Chen Rīfa; pinyin: Jiǎng Lìhuá) is the young Empress of the Chinese Federation, although she has thus far been referred to only by the traditional title attributed to the Chinese Emperor: Tianzi (天子, Tenshi; pinyin: Tiānzǐ), "the Child of Heaven". She is referred to as a "puppet princess" by the Eunuchs, who use her youth and lack of resolve, effectively allowing the Eunuchs to control the proceedings within the Chinese Federation. In practice, she was effectively a prisoner within her own palace, never seeing the world outside the Forbidden City, which she disliked. As a young child, she rescued a young Li Xingke from execution for giving some medicine to a prisoner, and in return he promised to take her outside the palace walls.

In exchange for the titles of Nobles within Britannia for the Eunuchs, Schneizel is able to arrange a political marriage between Tianzi and Britannia's First Prince Odysseus. However, the ceremony is interrupted by Li Xingke and the Black Knights, who instigate a coup d'état and place her back in control of the Federation, making them Lelouch's first allies in his global alliance. After Lelouch becomes Emperor, he kidnaps Tianzi along with the other delegates of the UFN as political hostages in the war against Schneizel. After Lelouch abandons the Avalon, in essence releasing the hostages, she is rescued by Xingke and asserts that Sayoko, Cécile, and Lloyd saved her along with the other U.F.N. delegates. However, she and Xingke are both captured by Lelouch and are freed upon his death.

== United Republic of Europia ==
The United Republic of Europia, also referred to as Europia United or the E.U., was created around the time of the Industrial Revolution, following Napoleon Bonaparte's successful invasion and occupation of the British Isles, causing the British royal family to be exiled to their American colonies, which would later become the Holy Britannian Empire after George Washington's failed rebellion. Due to the export of revolution and war throughout Europe, Napoleon managed to seize much power and authority. After Napoleon attempts to form an empire with himself as emperor, republican revolutionaries overthrow and execute him via guillotine. This was the turning point of Europe's history, and with this the E.U became a democratic superpower.

The capital of E.U. is Paris, led by three presidents, and managed by the Council of Forty, all of whom are democratically elected by the people. The Council of Forty is based on the parliamentary system established after the French Revolution, and currently has over 200 members. With a declaration of war from the Holy Britannian Empire, the Council of Forty has to take charge of national defense and military matters as well.

While they have been mentioned in the Lelouch of the Rebellion series, Europia has only made its full appearance in the Akito the Exile OVA series.

Europia United's collective military forces are divided into individual national armed forces referred to as "state armies", though the exact nature of these armed forces is not clear. From what is shown, the only Knightmare Frames that the E.U. use are the Gardmare, Panzer-Hummel and Panzer-Wespe, along with the Alexander model specific to the W-0 unit.

=== Wyvern Squad ===
==== Akito Hyuga ====
Voiced by: Miyu Irino (Japanese); Micah Solusod (English)
Young Akito
Voiced by: Ryōka Yuzuki (Japanese); Apphia Yu (English)

Akito Hyuga (日向アキト, Hyūga Akito) is the protagonist of Akito the Exiled, a 17-year-old soldier who has lost his hometown. He is an officer in E.U. military with the rank of lieutenant from a unit consisting of teenagers from Area 11 called W-0. During the year 2017 a.t.b., Akito takes part in a military operation on the European battlefront as a Knightmare Frame pilot. Like Suzaku, Akito has a Geass command that he controls at will, allowing him to savagely kill his enemies in the battlefield, thus was given the title "Hannibal's Ghost". Akito can also see spirits of his fallen comrades as he revealed he died once.

==== Ryo Sayama ====
Voiced by: Satoshi Hino (Japanese); Ricco Fajardo (English)

Ryo Sayama (佐山リョウ, Sayama Ryō) is a 17-year-old man and the leader of a particular group that opposes the Mafia. He was recruited by Leila after he and his group fail to kidnap the E.U. general, Gene Smilas, and is part of the "W-0" group and pilot a Special Forces Unit, Alexander Type-02.

==== Ayano Kosaka ====
Voiced by: Yōko Hikasa (Japanese); Elizabeth Maxwell (English)

Ayano Kosaka (香坂アヤノ, Kōsaka Ayano) is a 15-year-old girl who is also in Ryo's group. She is constantly practicing katana.

==== Yukiya Naruse ====
Voiced by: Yoshitsugu Matsuoka (Japanese); Aaron Dismuke (English)

Yukiya Naruse (成瀬ユキヤ, Naruse Yukiya) is a 16-year-old boy who belongs to Ryo's group. He excels at collecting data and handling explosives.

=== W-0 unit ===
Since the war with Britannia began, The Council of Forty began recruiting a unit of non-EU citizens to fight in the front line, to prevent more casualties and deaths being inflicted on their troops. The Elevens (Japanese) population from Île de la Cité, an Island in Paris where they have been exiled by Britannia, were recruited by the EU with the condition that they and their families would be granted EU citizenship if they join the military.

The existence of this unit is unknown to the public and EU members and scientists are tasked at supervising them, while they participate in suicide missions that often sends pilots to their deaths. Akito was recently the only survivor in his last missions before Ryo and his group joined. Their main Knightmares are the Alexanders.

==== Leila Malcal ====
Voiced by: Maaya Sakamoto, Sumire Morohoshi (child) (Japanese); Jeannie Tirado (English)

Leila Malcal (レイラ・マルカル, Reira Marukaru) is a former Britannian aristocrat and a military officer in the E.U. Army. As Akito Hyuga's superior, she is promoted to the next rank, as the Lieutenant Colonel and the new commander of the W-0 Unit. In her childhood, she received a Geass from C.C., though rather than entering into a contract with her, she was given a choice of whether or not she would use it, and if she did not use it before adulthood, the power would disappear. Due to laying dormant for so long, it possesses a unique blue color, with its power being to connect minds. Leila is also said to have feelings for Akito in which she comforted him in the 3rd episode of Akito the Exiled; in the fifth and final episode, her feelings are confirmed when she kisses Akito.

==== Oscar Hammel ====
Voiced by: Showtaro Morikubo (Japanese); Chuck Huber (English)

Oscar Hammel (オスカー・ハメル, Osukā Hameru) is the vice captain of the Guard Troops in Castle Weisswolf, which is in the "W-0" base.

==== Sophie Randle ====
Voiced by: Yūko Kaida (Japanese); Terri Doty (English)

Sophie Randle (ソフィ・ランドル, Sofi Randoru), a civilian brain science expert who was recruited from the private sector to work with the military group, "W-0."

==== Claus Warwick ====
Voiced by: Keiji Fujiwara (Japanese); Ian Sinclair (English)

Claus Warwick (クラウス・ウォリック, Kurausu Uorikku) is Leila Malcal's aide-de-camp and lieutenant in the E.U. military's Special Forces Unit "W-0."

==== Joe Wise ====
Voiced by: Shinji Kawada (Japanese); Jim Foronda (English)

Joe Wise (ジョウ・ワイズ, Jō Waizu) is an assistant researcher of Sophie Randle who loves sweets. He joins the "W-0" on a mission.

==== Anna Clément ====
Voiced by: Ai Kayano (Japanese); Bryn Apprill (English)

Anna Clément (アナ・クレメント, Ana Kuremento) is a genius scientist and the developer of the Alexander. She is a childhood friend of Leila Malcal. She has the rank of captain in the E.U. army.

==== Hilda Fagan ====
Voiced by: Saori Hayami (Japanese); Anne Beyer (English)

Hilda Fagan (ヒルダ・フェイガン, Hiruda Faygan) is an assistant to Anna Clément. She calls Anna "boss" during their conversations.

==== Chloe Winkel ====
Voiced by: Nao Tōyama (Japanese); Jamie Marchi (English)

Chloe Winkel (クロエ・ウィンケル, Kuroe Uinkeru) is an assistant to Anna Clément. She accompanies for the military operation of W-0.

==== Sarah Danes ====
Voiced by: Natsumi Takamori (Japanese); Janelle Lutz (English)

Sarah Danes (サラ・デインズ, Sara Deinzu) is an Operator working with W-0. She has a businesslike attitude towards her work.

==== Ferilli Baltrow ====
Voiced by: Asami Seto (Japanese); Monica Rial (English)

Ferilli Baltrow (フェリッリ・バルトロウ, Ferirri Barutorou) is one of Sophie Randle's subordinates and co-workers from the Private Sector.

==== Olivia Reuel ====
Voiced by: Mariya Ise (Japanese); Morgan Garrett (English)

Olivia Reuel (オリビア・ロウエル, Oribia Roueru) is an Operator who works for W-0. Unlike Chloe Winkel and Hilda Fagan, she was originally in the European Union Army.

==== Kate Novak ====
Voiced by: Mikako Komatsu (Japanese); Dawn M. Bennett (English)

Kate Novak (ケイト・ノヴァク, Keito Novuaku) is a medical subordinate trained under Sophie Randle.

==== Gene Smilas ====
Voiced by: Unshō Ishizuka (Japanese); Christopher R. Sabat (English)

Gene Smilas (ジーン・スマイラス, Jīn Sumairasu) is a general of the E.U. Army., who was Leila Malcal's superior.

== Euro Britannia ==
=== Knights of St. Michael ===
==== Shin Hyuga Shaing ====
Voiced by: Masaya Matsukaze (Japanese); Alex Organ (English)
Young Shin
Voiced by: Junko Minagawa (Japanese); Terri Doty (English)

Shin Hyuga Shaing (シン・ヒュウガ・シャイング, Shin Hyūga Shaingu) is a Britannian knight of the Britannian Military and the leader of the Knights of St. Michael. He has a Geass which makes those he loves kill themselves or others, although he seems to not be aware of this limitation.

==== Jean Rowe ====
Voiced by: Mariya Ise (Japanese); Jad Saxton (English)

Jean Rowe (ジャン・ロウ, Jan Rou) is a Britannian knight who works for Shin Hyuga Shaing.

==== Michele Manfredi ====
Voiced by: Kenta Miyake (Japanese); Chris Rager (English)

Michele Manfredi (ミケーレ・マンフレディ, Mikēre Manfuredi) was the Grand Master of the Knights of St. Michael, and a former member of the Knights of the Round, once holding the position of the Knight of Two.

=== Augusta Henry Velaines ===
Voiced by: Takayuki Sugō (Japanese); Jason Douglas (English)

Augusta Henry Velaines (オーガスタ・ヘンリ・ハイランド, Ōgasuta Henri Hairando) is the Britannian Archduke of Verance, who serves as suzerain overseeing the European territories of Britannia.

=== Andrea Farnese ===
Voiced by: Takehito Koyasu (Japanese); Aaron Roberts (English)

Andrea Farnese (アンドレア・ファルネーゼ, Andorea Farunēze) is the Grand Master of the Knights of St. Raphael.

=== Michael Augustus ===
Voiced by: Fumihiko Tachiki (Japanese); Mark Stoddard (English)

Michael Augustus (ミヒャエル・アウグストゥス, Mihyaeru Augusutusu)

=== Gaudefroy du Villon ===
Voiced by: Taketora (Japanese); Barry Yandell (English)

Gaudefroy du Villon (ゴドフロア・ド・ヴィヨン, Godofuroa do Viyon) is the Grand Master of the Knights of St. Gabriel.

=== Raymond du Saint-Gilles ===
Voiced by: Hikaru Miyata (Japanese); Charlie Campbell (English)

Raymond du Saint-Gilles (レーモンド・ド・サン・ジル, Rēmondo do San Jiru) is the Grand Master of the Knights of St. Uriel.

=== Alice Shaing ===
Voiced by: Kaori Ishihara (Japanese); Bryn Apprill (English)

Alice Shaing (アリス・シャイング, Arisu Shaingu) is the Britannian, adoptive, little sister of Shin.

=== Maria Shaing ===
Voiced by: Mamiko Noto (Japanese); Jamie Marchi (English)

Maria Shaing (マリア・シャイング, Maria Shaingu) is the Britannian, adoptive mother of Shin.

=== Ashley Ashra ===
Ashley Ashra (アシュレイ・アシュラ, Ashurei Ashura; voiced by Takuma Terashima (Japanese), Joel McDonald (English)), is a Knight of St. Michael that loves war.

Asura Team members are Johanne Fabius (ヨハネ・ファビウス, Yohane Fabiusu; voiced by Nobunaga Shimazaki (Japanese), Stephen Fu (English)), blonde haired, sacrificed member; René Laurent (ルネ・ロラン, Rune Roran; voiced by Ryōta Ōsaka (Japanese), Nazeeh Tarsha (English)), red haired and dark skinned; Jan Manes (ヤン・マーネス, Yan Mānesu; voiced by Kaito Ishikawa (Japanese), Donald Shults (English)), purple haired and wears glasses; Simon Mericourt (シモン・メリクール, Shimon Merikūru; voiced by Yūichi Iguchi (Japanese), Apphia Yu (English)), black long haired; Kuzan Montoban (クザン・モントバン, Kuzan Montoban; voiced by Natsuki Hanae (Japanese), Austin Tindle (English)), bald and equips earrings; Alan Necker (アラン・ネッケル, Aran Nekkeru; voiced by Genki Muro (Japanese), Alex Eding (English)), turquoise haired and eye covered; Franz Vallo (フランツ・ヴァッロ, Furantsu Vuarro; voiced by Yūki Ono (Japanese), Alejandro Saab (English)), brown haired and the only overweight member.

== Zilkistan ==
Introduced in Code Geass: Lelouch of the Resurrection, the Kingdom of Zilkhstan was founded three centuries before the events of the series through the support of the Farlaf organization were previous a part of the Geass Order. This allowed Zilkistan to possess knowledge of C's World, developing the Aramu Gate to access it. Despite its lack of natural resources, the country employs its soldiers whom the Britannian Army considered troublesome. However, the peacetime caused by Lelouch's death threatens Zilkistan's livelihood as they kidnap Nunnally and use her to manipulate the collective unconsciousness for their own ends.

=== Shalio ===
Voiced by: Ayumu Murase (Japanese); Jared Gilmore (English)

Shalio (シャリオ, Shario) is the King of Zilkistan and Shamna's younger brother. He is a fierce opponent in a knightmare.

=== Shamna ===
Voiced by: Keiko Toda (Japanese); Elizabeth Maxwell (English)

Shamna (シャムナ, Shamuna) is Zilkistan princess and priestess whose Geass allows her to send her soul six hours into the past every time she dies, giving her a chance to change the outcome of coming events.

=== Bolvona Forgner ===
Voiced by: Akio Otsuka (Japanese); Patrick Seitz (English)

Volvona Forgner (ボルボナ・フォーグナー, Borubona Fōgunā) is the commander-in-chief of Zilkistan. He was nicknamed "The Sun-kissed Rampart" for his defense of an impregnable fortress.

=== Sheesthal Forgner ===
Voiced by: Nobunaga Shimazaki (Japanese); Rich Sommer (English)

Sheesthal Forgner (シェスタール・フォーグナー, Shesutāru Fōgunā) is the Captain of Priestess Shamna's elite guard. Cmdr. Forgner's son. He has pride in his country.

=== Belq Batoum Bitool ===
Voiced by: Wataru Takagi (Japanese); Christopher Sabat (English)

Belq Batoum Bitool (ベルク バトム ビトゥール, Beruku Batomu Bituuru) is the warden of a large prison. A former bandit, he's rowdy and loves to pick fights.

=== Swaile Qujappat ===
Voiced by: Kenjiro Tsuda (Japanese); Gabe Kunda (English)

Swaile Qujappat (スウェイル・クジャパット, Suwairu Kujapatto) leads a team of assassins, he is a cruel-man who used to be with the Geass Cult.

== Neo Britannia ==
Introduced in Code Geass: Rozé of the Recapture, The Neo Britannian Empire is a nation formed by Britannian remnants seeking to restore the former Holy Britannian Empire in Charles' vision.

=== Nameless Mercenaries ===
==== Sakuya Sumeragi ====
Voiced by: Reina Ueda (Japanese); Suzie Yeung (English)

Rozé

Voiced by: Kōhei Amasaki (Japanese); Luca Padovan (English)

Sakuya Sumeragi (皇 サクヤ, Sumeragi Sakuya) is the protagonist of Rozé of the Recapture, the current princess of the United States of Japan who assumed the alias Rozé (ロゼ, Rozé) following Neo Britannia's invasion of Japan. As Rozé, she is part of the Nameless Mercenary (ナナシの傭兵, Nanashi no yōhei) duo and acts as the younger brother of Ash while her friend and lookalike Sakura Haruyanaginomiya assumes her role as a double. Like Kallen, she is Britannian-Japanese, as it was revealed that her mother Sherry me Britannia left the imperial family long ago and married a Japanese royal, thus secretly making her the 20th in line to be Empress of Britannia. Through her paternal family, she is a cousin to Kaguya Sumeragi.

She receives a geass from Lelouch (as L.L.) during her early run from Neo Britannia, presumably as a sign of Lelouch's assistance on her rebellion. Similar to Lelouch, her geass gives her "The Power of Absolute Obedience", allowing her to plant commands within a person's mind with her voice a manner comparable to hypnosis, though instead of manifesting from her eyes, activation of her Geass is visually represented by the Geass Sigil appearing over her throat while being suppressed by her choker, which acts as voice changer and changes her eye color. Possessing a formidable intellect, she acts as the tactician and strategist of the Nameless Mercenaries and pilots the Zi-Artemis Knightmare Frame, which can combine with the Zi-Apollo to form the Zi-Ortygia.

==== Ash Phoenix ====
Voiced by: Makoto Furukawa (Japanese); Cory Yee (English)

One of the protagonists of Rozé of the Recapture. Ash Phoenix is the older brother of the Britannian mercenary duo known as the "Nameless Mercenary". He possesses exceptional physical abilities and is also highly skilled in piloting KMFs (Knightmare Frames). His prowess allows him to engage on equal footing or even surpass the knights of the Neo-Britannian Empire's "Einberg." Because of this, he has followed the strategies devised by his younger brother, Rozé, and has achieved numerous victories. His beloved KMF in battle is the Zi-Apollo.

Ash is a Britannian who has had his memories and emotions rewritten by Sakuya's geass. He and his true younger brother, Nichol, were orphans adopted by Norland von Lunebelg, and trained as soldiers and assassins. Ash's accomplishments later granted him the elite rank of Knight of Thirteen in Britannia's Knights of the Round. When the brothers separately failed the same mission, Nichol attempted to take the blame and was killed by Norland. Nichol's death traumatized Ash and he tried to kill Norland, leading to Ash's imprisonment where he met Sakuya's father Jugo Sumeragi. Ash eventually escaped but blamed himself for failing to stop Jugo's execution. Sakuya mistakenly believed that Ash killed Jugo, and therefore planned to kill Ash after he completes the mission of saving Sakura. Her geass made Ash believe that Rozé, a fictional brother created by Sakuya, is his real brother. Although they are unrelated by blood, he is consumed by the emotion of prioritizing his "brother" and willing to undertake any mission for Rozé.

Outwardly cold and professional, Ash's kinder side is through the stray animals he finds and cares for. He falls in love with Raspberry, a waitress at cafe Shumari, and is unaware she is actually Sakuya out of disguise until after his geass is lifted and Sakuya reluctantly admits the truth.

=== Neo Britannian Empire ===
==== Norland von Lunebelg ====
Voiced by: Hiroki Yasumoto (Japanese); Dan Green (English)

Norland von Lunebelg is the prime antagonist of Code Geass: Roźe of the Recapture, a sequel to Code Geass: Lelouch of the Resurrection. A former Knight of Round who defected following the restructuring of the Holy Britannian Empire and seized control over the Hokkaido block in Japan, he established the Neo-Britannian Empire as leader of the Einberg order of knights while placing Callis al Britannia as a figurehead. He is eventually revealed to be a clone of Charles zi Britannia that the emperor commissioned to be a replacement body to transfer his mind in the event of the his death.

Believing himself to be superior to humans, Norland planned a mass-genocide of humanity with the mass-produced LOKI Knightmare Frame drones. He figured Roze's identity as his genetic template's granddaughter, Sakuya me Britannia, and murders Callis as he attempts to force Roze to become the 101st empress to legitimize Neo-Britannia. Norland is eventually killed off when he activates his Foulbout's self-destruct in an attempt to take Sakuya and Ash Phoenix with him after they overpowered him.

==== Sakura Haruyanaginomiya ====
Voiced by: Reina Ueda (Japanese); Xanthe Huynh (English)

Sakura Haruyanaginomiya (春柳宮 サクラ, Haruyanaginomiya Sakura) is the best friend and body double of Sakuya Sumeragi. While fleeing the Einberg knights, Sakura was captured and mistaken as Sakuya. To protect Sakuya, Sakura has maintained the impersonation and allowed herself to be a political prisoner of Neo-Britannia under Sakuya's identity. Following the assassination of Callis al Britannia, Neo-Britannia declares Sakuya as the next empress. Aware that Neo-Britannia intends for Sakuya to be an empress in name only, Sakura subverts their plans by acting as more than a powerless puppet ruler.

== Other characters ==
=== Genbu Kururugi ===
Voiced by: Kazuhiko Kishino (Japanese); John Snyder (English)

Genbu Kururugi (枢木 ゲンブ, Kururugi Genbu) is Suzaku's late father, the last Prime Minister of Japan prior to Ohgi's instatement, and host for both Lelouch and Nunnally Lamperouge during their exile as political hostages seven years prior to the start of the series. When Britannia began its invasion of Japan, Genbu refused to surrender, preferring unending resistance against Britannia. In an argument over whether to stop the war against Britannia he was murdered by his own son, Suzaku. In the immediate aftermath of the incident, the truth behind Genbu's death was covered up by his associates, who are later known as the Kyoto Group, and reported as seppuku, noble suicide.

In Suzaku of the Counter attack, Genbu is secretly working with Britannia to undermine Japan's leadership. Suzaku overhears his conversation with the Emperor and is forced to kill Genbu. In the Nightmare of Nunnally he decides to kill both Lelouch and Nunnally but before he can C.C. kills him with Suzaku witnessing the act.

=== Mao ===
Voiced by: Takeshi Kusao (Japanese); Ezra Weisz (English)

Mao (マオ) is a Chinese orphan who was given the power of Geass by C.C. at the age of six. His power allows him to hear the surface thoughts of anyone within a 500-meter radius, regardless of obstructions or eye contact. Mao's Geass, as a result of continued use, is present in both eyes, and permanently active; as a result, the constant influx of thoughts from all around him drove him insane. C.C. claims she abandoned him because he was not able to fulfill his part of their contract. In order to compensate for his uncontrolled power, Mao wears sunglasses to disguise his eyes and headphones which repeatedly play recorded words of encouragement and gratitude from C.C. in an attempt to block out the thoughts of those around him.

As a result of his lack of human contact, Mao is a fairly childish person, a fact only amplified by his insanity. The inability to read C.C.'s mind allows Mao to find solace in her, eventually developing into a childish form of love. He refuses to accept that C.C. doesn't love him in return and pursues her relentlessly to the point of obsessive love. When Mao finds C.C. in Area 11, she tries to get rid of him after Lelouch argues that killing Mao would have been more humane. However, she fails and Lelouch saves her, using his Geass to use the local law enforcement, and make them shoot Mao. Mao survives with the help of Britannia's advanced medicine. After escaping custody, he then kidnaps and holds Nunnally hostage in the lower levels of the Ashford Academy, hoping to lure out and eliminate Lelouch in an elaborate game. Lelouch collaborates with Suzaku and devises a strategy to rescue Nunnally resulting in Lelouch Geassing Mao to never speak again. As Mao tries to escape, C.C. fatally shoots him in the neck with a silenced pistol.

=== Naoto Kozuki ===
Naoto Kouzuki (紅月ナオト, Kouzuki Naoto) is the brother of Kallen Kozuki and a member of the Resistance forces intent on liberating Japan from Britannia. He was killed before the start of the series, which spurred Kallen into taking up the fight against Britannia. Prior to his death, he was in charge of the Resistance cell being led by Kaname Ohgi at the start of the series. His death caused Ohgi to leave his job as a schoolteacher in order to lead the resistance cell and realize Naoto's dream of an independent Japan.

=== V.V. ===
Voiced by: Kazato Tomizawa (2007-2012), Eisuke Kawashiro (2018) (Japanese); Cindy Robinson (English)

V.V. (ヴイ・ツー, Vi Tsū; pronounced "Vee Two") is Charles zi Britannia's older twin, but looks much younger because he has gained immortality through a Code at the age of ten. After C.C.'s separation from Marianne and Charles, V.V. succeeds C.C. as the leader of the Geass Order, a secret organization that studies and produces Geass users. As with C.C., he can grant Geass contracts and gave both his brother and Rolo Lamperouge their Geass abilities, among others in the Geass Order. His intent is to complete the contract with his brother to "kill God" in order to stop humans from fighting among themselves while remaining true to each other. However, V.V. murdered Marianne when he saw her as a hindrance for his brother and sets up the official assassination, breaking his promise of mutual honesty between him and Charles when he lied of his part in Marianne's death.

Immediately prior to the First Decisive Battle of Tokyo, he appears before Suzaku and explains the nature of Geass, using Euphemia's uncharacteristic actions during the establishment of the Special Administrative Zone of Japan and his own insubordination at Shikine island to entice him. He subsequently kidnaps Nunnally, resulting in Lelouch's sudden abandonment of the Black Knights mid-battle, causing their defeat. In the second season, V.V. starts to work behind the Emperor's back. During Lelouch's assault on the Geass Order, he pilots the Siegfried against the Black Knights, but is defeated by Lelouch and Cornelia. Heavily wounded, V.V. manages to reach the Twilight Gate to the Thought Elevator in the Order's complex only to have his Code taken by Charles, causing him to succumb to his wounds.

The real name revealed in the Japanese smartphone game "Code Geass Genesic Re;CODE" is Victor zi Britannia (ヴィクトル・ジ・ブリタニア, Vikutoru Ji Buritania).

== Spin-off characters ==
These are characters present only in the spin-off media, such as the Nightmare of Nunnally manga and the video games.

=== Video game characters ===
==== Castor rui Britannia ====
Castor rui Britannia is a character exclusive to the Nintendo DS video game and a member of the Britannian Imperial Family. His twin brother is Pollux rui Britannia. He pilots the Knightmare Frame Aquila. Castor possesses a Geass that allows for both telepathic communication with his brother, and making other people suffer headaches.

==== Pollux rui Britannia ====
Pollux rui Britannia is a character exclusive to the Nintendo DS video game and a member of the Britannian Imperial Family. His twin brother is Castor rui Britannia. He pilots the Knightmare Frame Equus. Pollux possesses the same Geass ability as Lelouch, though when brought against one another his seems to be inferior. He is frequently mistaken for his brother, much to his annoyance.

==== Rai ====
Rai (ライ; Rai is the default name; the player can rename him at their discretion) is the protagonist of the PlayStation 2/PlayStation Portable video game, Code Geass: Lost Colors. He possesses the same Geass ability as Lelouch, but it uses sound as a medium instead of eye contact. The effect is represented as a red wave like Rolo's Geass. Suffering from amnesia, Rai is discovered by Milly and Lelouch at Ashford Academy, where he fell unconscious after escaping a Britannian facility. He is taken in as a temporary student, while trying to recover his memories. Although his face is never seen, he appears to be fairly young, has blue eyes and has grey hair worn in a similar style as Lelouch's.

Rai's father is eventually revealed to be a member of Britannian royalty while his mother was a Japanese woman from the Sumeragi clan, the same clan Kaguya Sumeragi belongs to. His mixed-blood status resulted in ill treatment from his other siblings. Hundreds of years ago, in order to protect his mother and younger sister, he bound himself in a Geass contract with an unidentified individual and his Geass ability allowed him to ascend to power. However, during a war with a neighboring country, while he was only trying to raise the fighting spirit of his people in a speech, he lost control of his Geass and accidentally ordered the people to fight to the death against the enemy. This order caused not only his people, but his mother and sister who he had wished to protect, to charge to their deaths, leaving him with nothing. In his loneliness and sadness, he used his power on himself to make him forget all of this and put himself into a deep sleep inside a ruin similar to that found on Kaminejima. He was discovered by General Bartley, who put him in the same facility in Area 11 where C.C. was held captive by Britannia. When he awoke, Rai used his power of Geass to escape the facility, ending up at Ashford Academy.

Rai also appears as the protagonist of the second Nintendo DS game, Code Geass: Lelouch of the Rebellion R2: Geass Theater of Upper Board. Along with the male design used in Lost Colors, a female design for Rai was made available. The character has a different role in the game, being a transfer student attending Ashford Academy for a month and lacking the Geass ability present in Lost Colors.

=== Suzaku of the Counterattack characters ===
==== Mariel Lubie ====
Mariel Lubie (マリエル・ラビエ, Marieru Rabie) takes Cécile Croomy's place as Lloyd Asplund's assistant in the Suzaku of the Counterattack manga. She had recently graduated from university prior to her recruitment to the military. Mariel quickly develops a close friendship with Suzaku and is often seen with him.

==== Lenard Lubie ====
Lenard Lubie (レナルド・ラビエ, Renarudo Rabie) is Mariel's father. Unlike most Britannians, he greets Suzaku like any other person without questioning his lineage. Lenard was preparing to leave Area 11 and requested Suzaku to take care of Mariel while he's gone. Like Mariel, he was targeted a renegade Black Knights faction before Suzaku saved them. He is critically injured in an explosion and later dies.

=== Nightmare of Nunnally characters ===
==== Alice ====
Alice (アリス, Arisu) is a tomboyish girl who is Nunnally's best friend and classmate, but is secretly an agent of the Irregulars assigned to the surveillance of Milly Ashford under the cover identity of a middle school student. Alice's normal physical abilities have been augmented with cells originating from C.C., giving her a Geass ability called "The Speed", which allows her to hyperaccelerate all objects within a given radius by manipulating gravitational pull. Designated by her unit to pilot a Knightmare Frame customized to exploit this ability, Alice serves as a highly effective point man on the field of battle. When her ability is active, a Geass sigil appears on her forehead. Alice's blood contains a chemical suppressant that minimizes the activity of C.C.'s biological matter, which has a tendency to strain and overtax the human body. A neutralizer for the suppressant may be administered to temporarily boost the effect of "The Speed" in battle, enabling movement of sufficiently high speed that it resembles teleportation.

==== Dalque ====
Dalque (ダルク, Daruku) is a dark-skinned girl who serves as point man for the Irregulars. She possesses a Geass ability known as "The Power", which augments her physical strength by exaggerating the magnitude of macroscopic forces. When her ability is active, a Geass sigil appears upon her forehead. Her Knightmare Frame cockpit is installed with synchronization receptors that allow expression of this ability as a highly effective frame strength enhancer.

==== Lucretia ====
Lucretia (ルクレティア, Rukuretia) is a pale-haired girl who is a member of the Irregulars. She possesses a Geass ability known as "The Land", which accurately maps three-dimensional terrain within a given range. The results of her perceptions are instantly submitted to her Knightmare Frame via a cockpit neuroimaging device and collated with GPS data before being distributed to her team for tactical purposes. When her ability is active, a Geass sigil appears upon her forehead. She is typically partnered with Sancia, whose tracking Geass ability complements her own.

==== Mao (Nightmare of Nunnally) ====
In the sidestory Nightmare of Nunnally, Mao a young Chinese girl who deserts the Irregulars. Like them, she has a Geass ability granted by an infusion of cell matter from C.C. A Geass sigil lights up in her left eye when she uses it. Her Geass ability is known as "The Refrain", which allows her to read and manipulate the minds of others through eye contact. In addition to ordinary mind-reading, it allows her to render her victim catatonic by forcing them to relive past experiences, similar to the drug in the anime it is named after. Because C.C.'s cell matter causes cellular breakdown, she seeks to steal Nunnally's bond with Nemo, which she believes to be a possible cure. After Alice breaks Mao's remaining suppressants, Mao lets herself die.

==== Nemo ====
Nemo (ネモ) is a protagonist of the manga spin-off Nightmare of Nunnally along with Nunnally herself. Nemo is a mysterious energy life-form developed under Code R using a sample of C.C.'s cells. She is referred to by the Britannian military as a magical device (魔導器, madōki). Shortly after being released alongside C.C. in the Shinjuku Ghetto, she encounters and enters into a contract with Nunnally, granting her a Geass ability that allows sight of "the lines of the future", effectively giving her precognition. She assumes an appearance resembling an albino Nunnally upon contract finalization, and the two of them come to share a single mind. Nemo's personality remains distinct from Nunnally and is said to be an expression of Nunnally's unconscious anger and hostility. Normally disembodied and visible only to Nunnally, Nemo possesses Nunnally's body and temporarily restores it to a functioning state upon summoning the Knightmare Frame Mark Nemo, which they pilot as one. Their piloting style is thought by Cornelia to closely resemble that of the late Marianne. Nemo means "nobody" or "no one" in Latin, which may refer to her shadowy and enigmatic nature.

==== Sancia ====
Sancia (サンチア, Sanchia) is a dark-haired woman who serves as a field captain for the Irregulars. She possesses a Geass ability known as "The Order", which accurately identifies the positions of targets within a given range and precisely calculates their probable movement trajectories based on all known variables. The results of her calculations are instantly submitted to her Knightmare Frame via a cockpit neuroimaging device and collated with radar information before being distributed to her team for tactical purposes. When her ability is active, a Geass sigil appears upon her forehead. She is typically partnered with Lucretia, whose terrain-mapping Geass ability complements her own. She is older than her subordinates.

==== Rolo vi Britannia ====
Rolo vi Britannia (ロロ・ヴィ・ブリタニア, Roro vi Buritania) is Lelouch's twin brother, though his existence is unknown to Lelouch and Nunnally. In reality, he is not Lelouch's twin, but rather a clone created from the DNA of Charles and Marianne, and then brainwashed into believing he was the twin brother of Lelouch. Rolo is involved with the Geass Order and known as The Cardinal. He pilots his very own customized Vincent Knightmare Frame. Like Nunnally and Lelouch, Rolo has access to Geass powers; his Geass, "The Ice", possesses the ability to halt one's experience of time and encases its victims in a layer of ice. He is driven to find Nunnally, who has become key to obtaining the true power of the Geass through her connection to Nemo. By killing Nunnally and Lelouch, Rolo intends to take their powers to become the true Demon King and overthrow the Emperor.

=== Renya of Darkness characters ===
==== Renya ====
Renya (蓮夜) is a seventeen-year-old boy from the Edo period with a mechanical left arm. Residing in a hidden village, he studies academic subjects alongside the arts of ninjutsu and has been chosen by the village's late leader Kouga to be his successor. Despite his poor academic standings and his lack of sword skills, Renya has been shown to be a capable fighter with shuriken and through his resourcefulness and sheer determination. When Renya's village is attacked by outsiders, he is approached by C.C., who offers Geass to save his friends. However, Renya receives a curse that gives his prosthetic the power to absorb people's energy. Despite having difficulties to control it, Renya decides to use it to protect his friends. It has recently been revealed that Renya can no longer survive off consuming food and water and must continue to absorb the life energy from others to survive.

==== Claire li Britannia ====
Introduced as Carla (カルラ, Karura), an intellectual girl who cares deeply for Renya and wants him to succeed so he can remain in the village, she often tries to help Renya improve his poor mathematical skills, but is usually refused and her methods insulted by Renya. Most of their friends suspect she has a crush on Renya. When the village is attacked by a group of samurai led by Isshin Sumeragi, Carla and her friends are captured. When Renya arrives to save them, Isshin Sumeragi's collaborator Alto Weinberg reveals that Carla is actually Claire li Britannia (クレア・リ・ブリタニア, Kurea ri Buritania), the next intended Empress of Britannia. Her parents had originally sent her to Japan due to unrest within the Britannian Imperial Family, where she adopted the role of Carla within the hidden village and befriended Renya and his friends. Because she has become the target of the Knightmares, she reluctantly accepts Lord Weinberg's suggestion to return to Britannia, though with the company of her friends.

==== Anji ====
Anji (アンジ) is Renya's childhood friend. Ever since Renya was made successor to the village leader, Anji has called him "Master", though Renya has unsuccessfully told him not to. Unlike Renya, Angie is quite skilled in swordsmanship. He faithfully accompanies Renya after being reunited with him after the attack on the hidden village.

==== Misuzu ====
Misuzu (美鈴) is one of Carla's friends, a girl who frequently expresses doubt in the effectiveness of Carla's methods to improve Renya's academic standing. She teases Carla about having a crush on Renya. Misuzu, along with the rest of the group except for Renya, are captured after escaping the attack from their village. After being freed, she remains with Renya's group as they reluctant following Lord Weinberg's suggestion to go to Britannia.

==== Shiori ====
Shiori (栞) is one of Carla's friends, the youngest of the group. She often has a playful side when Anji mentions Carla's feelings for Renya and often teases her with Misuzu. Like the rest of the group, she too is captured after escaping the attack from their village led by Isshin. She remains with Renya's group after Carla is saved from Isshin and Mesh the Mish.

==== Alto Weinberg ====
Alto Weinberg (アルト・ヴァインベルグ, Aruto Vainberugu) is a Britannian soldier who demonstrates considerable skill in combat and wields twin swords. Though he is able to speak Japanese fluently, his unfamiliarity with the language often results in using the wrong terms when speaking. Lord Weinberg arrived in Japan with C.C. in order to find Claire li Britannia, collaborating with the Sumeragi group in order to do so. However, Lord Weinberg is dismayed to discover the unnecessary bloodshed and violent treatment towards the villagers taken hostage. Among the hostages, he recognizes that Carla is the missing Claire li Britannia. When Renya arrives to save his friends, Alto develops an interest in Renya's abilities. After Mesh takes Claire, Alto joins Renya's group to rescue her and subsequently remains with them in order to protect Claire. It is implied that Lord Weinberg's reasons for accepting a mission to find Claire are related to redeeming his honor in some way.

==== Isshin Sumeragi ====
Isshin Sumeragi (皇 一心, Sumeragi Isshin / Sumeragi Katsumune), the samurai who leads the attack on Renya's hidden village, finds pleasure in fighting against opponents he deems worthy. Isshin's name suggests a connection to the Sumeragi family and he has been working with C.C., displaying a great deal of trust in her. He reveals to Renya and his friends that the hidden village has secretly gathered supposedly deceased members of fallen noble families and overthrown lords in order to conceal their identities since the remnants of these families could possibly become powerful in the future, regardless of their lack of actual political connections. During the attack, Isshin fights Renya's teacher and survives the explosion from the teacher's suicide attack. When he goes to find C.C., he finds Renya and dies when Renya drains his life away.

==== Futaba Sumeragi ====
Futaba Sumeragi (皇 二葉, Sumeragi Futaba) is the half-sister of Isshin Sumeragi who is driven to avenge her half-brother after learning that Renya was responsible for his death. While she is serious regarding matters involving the Sumeragi family and is an agile fighter in the ninjutsu arts, she often finds herself in unexpectedly comic situations. During her first encounter with Renya, she witnesses the power of his left arm when he uses it to kill the warthog pursuing her. Shocked by his power, she believes that Renya is some sort of demon.

==== Mesh the Mish ====
Mesh the Mish (メッシュ・ザ・メッシ, Messhu za Messhi) is a Knightmare, an individual with super-enhanced abilities and does not appear to be human. By order of Sir Dash, he kidnaps Carla after Lord Weinberg identifies her as Claire li Britannia. Mesh has been shown to possess an ability to control the wind and is able to fly, but for a limited amount of time. He is described by the Japanese villages as a Karasu Tengu (烏天狗, Crow Demon). He is apparently killed by the combined efforts of Renya and Arturo

==== Dash ====
Dash (ダッシュ, Dasshu) is a Britannian noble and the apparent leader of the Knightmares. He is responsible for sending Mesh the Mish to Japan to find C.C. and intends to inhibit her plans as she travels with Claire li Britannia. Dash possesses a strong resemblance to Lelouch from the original series.

=== Oz the Reflection characters ===
==== Orpheus Zevon ====
Orpheus Zevon (オルフェウス·ジヴォン, Orufeusu Jivon) is the male protagonist of the series and a mercenary terrorist under the codename "Oz", receiving and acting on requests across the world from the organization "Peace Mark" that controls and sends out terrorists. He possesses a Geass in his left eye, and eventually his other eye as well.

Orpheus was originally born into the Zevon noble family in Britannia along with his twin sister Oldrin Zevon. However, because of the Zevon family tradition of succeeding through the female line and, in the cases of twins, removing the male child from the family, he was thrown away and adopted by a commoner family at a very young age, with little to no knowledge of his birth and family.

Soon after, however, he was taken in by the Geass Order, and was given the "Geass of Transformation" by V.V. there. Thereafter, he spent an unknown number of years within the Order, where he was forced to serve as an experimental specimen and develop his Geass. The only thing that let Orpheus endure these "hellish" days was Euliya, a fellow Geass-user he met within the Order and fell in love with. Also during that period, he met Rolo Lamperouge, Toto Thompson and Clara Lanfranc (the latter would then develop a deep hatred to him.)

At some point, the two of them conspired to escape from the Order so as not to be used as Geass-users, and managed to run away to a small unmapped village in southern Hungary. There, they were accepted by the small community of villagers and managed to attain a poor yet fulfilling life, which Orpheus describes as the "happiest time of his life". However, eventually, the village was attacked by his uncle Oiaguro Zevon and his four subordinates from the "Pluton" organization, on orders from V.V. and Emperor Charles to erase the escaped Orpheus and Euliya. Using Knightmares to burn down the village, they killed all the villagers, except for Orpheus, who was protected by Euliya with her life. While dying in his arms, Euliya used her last breath to ask him to "live", a wish that Orpheus would strive to accomplish, despite his sorrow at her death.

After an unknown period of time, Orpheus would join the mercenary and terrorist-controlling group "Peace Mark", and learned the truth behind his birth and his blood connection with Euliya's killer, Oiaguro. Swearing to achieve revenge against his uncle and his four subordinates who attacked the village, Orpheus "retook" the surname of Zevon that he now despised in order to engrave his decision in his heart, and remained within Peace Mark as a terrorist-for-hire that rebels against Britannia, believing that he would surely one day encounter Oiaguro and Pluton again this way.

During the Glinda Knights' trip to Tokyo, Orpheus rescued princess Marrybell mel Britannia when she was surrounded by the remnants of Black Knights. After that, under the guise of his twin sister (whom he "stole" her identity by his Geass), Orpheus managed to kill Clara who was posing as "Clara Lamperouge" in Ashford Academy under the Office of Secret Intelligence's order.

==== Oldrin Zevon ====
Oldrin Zevon (オルドリン・ジヴォン, Oldrin Jivon) is the female protagonist of the series and serves as the head knight of the Britannian Military's anti-terrorism unit, the "Glinda Knights", which was formed to counter the terrorism that began to occur in greater frequency after the Black Rebellion ended in Area 11. She is good friends with the group's leader, Imperial Princess Marrybell mel Britannia, whom Oldrin has known since childhood.

She was born into the noble Zevon family, but left and joined the military when the family was about to be taken over by her uncle Oiaguro. As a traditional noble, she has a lot of noble pride, but she is also a hard-worker. It is thanks to her hard work that she can serve as the pilot of the Knightmare Frame, Lancelot Grail, a mass-production prototype that is too difficult for ordinary people to pilot.

She is conflicted between her aristocratic belief that "the people should be protected" and her duty of suppressing terrorism caused by those very people. However, her conviction to "protect the smiling faces of the weak" is enough of a reason for her to fight. Her goal is to become a "true knight".

After her disappearance, she is now going to a school called Pendleton School of Madrid, and now wears a new outfit. She also pilots a custom of the Akatsuki called the Amanecer.

She later makes a cameo alongside the other Glinda knights in Code Geass: Lelouch of the Re;surrection movie.

=== Star Chaser Aspal characters ===
Aspal
Voiced by: Ivan Shibata
Zoe
Voiced by: Hibiku Yamamura
