= Eiji Yanagisawa =

Japanese voice actor (1967–2024)

- 柳沢 栄治
- Born: August 22, 1967
- Died: November 12, 2024 (aged 57)
- Occupation: Voice actor
- Years active: 1990–2024
- Agent: Production Baobab

Eiji Yanagisawa (柳沢 栄治, Yanagisawa Eiji; August 22, 1967 – November 12, 2024) was a Japanese voice actor affiliated with Production Baobab at the time of his death. He was originally from Tokyo, Japan.

Yanagisawa died from a brain stem hemorrhage on November 12, 2024, at the age of 57. His death was announced on Production Baobab's website eight days later after his family held a private funeral.

== Voice roles ==
=== Anime television series ===
- Arc the Lad - Elk's Father
- Kenichi: The Mightiest Disciple - Kurokawa, Shimayama, additional voices
- The Melancholy of Haruhi Suzumiya - Kiyosumi Morimura, Okabe-sensei, Umpire
- Mobile Suit Gundam Seed - Prof. Ulen Hibiki
- Naruto - Genzō
- Gensomaden Saiyuki - Fake Gojyo
- SD Gundam Force - Zapper Zaku, Gunbiker
- The World of Narue - Kazuto's Father

=== Original video animations ===
- I'll CKBC - Shigeru Obata

=== Drama CDs ===
- Abunaii series 4: Abunai Campus Love

=== Dubbing ===
- Dagon, Ezequiel (Francisco Rabal)
- Dead Ahead: The Exxon Valdez Disaster, Jack Lamb (Timothy Webber)
- FlashForward, Aaron Stark (Brían F. O'Byrne)
- Platoon (1998 DVD edition), Rodriguez, Tony
- Titanic (Original dub), Frederick Fleet (Scott G. Anderson)
