= James Discovers Math =

1995 video game

- Developer: Broderbund
- Publisher: Brains
- Platform: Windows 95
- Release: 1995
- Genre: Edutainment
- Mode: Single-player

James Discovers Math is an educational video game that was developed in 1995 by Broderbund in association with Australian developer Brains.

== Summary ==
The video game teaches vital skills in mathematics and is aimed at children aged 3–6 (preschool through first grade).

Because the game was partially developed in Australia, the characters speak with Australian accents, and several Australian brands, such as Qantas, make an appearance. The main character is James, a 6-year-old boy who is based on an actual Australian boy named James. The highlight of the game is a story called "James Makes a Salad", in which James destroys several fruits that his mother has just bought. This is based on something that the real James had done.
