= Kate Savage =

South African judge

Justice of the Constitutional Court
- Incumbent
- Assumed office 1 May 2026
- Appointed by: Cyril Ramaphosa

Judge of the High Court
- In office 1 January 2015 – 30 April 2026
- Appointed by: Jacob Zuma
- Division: Western Cape

Judge of the Labour Appeal Court
- In office 1 January 2024 – 30 April 2026
- Appointed by: Cyril Ramaphosa

Personal details
- Born: Katharine Mary Savage; 10 January 1968 (age 58) Johannesburg, Transvaal Province, South Africa
- Education: Westerford High School
- Alma mater: University of Cape Town, University of Notre Dame

Katharine Mary Savage (born 10 January 1968) is a South African attorney and judge. On 10 April 2026 she was appointed to the Constitutional Court of South Africa by President Cyril Ramaphosa, with effect from 1 May 2026. Before appointment to the Constitutional Court she served on the Western Cape Division of the High Court and the Labour Appeal Court.

== Early life and education ==
Savage was born on 10 January 1968 in Johannesburg. She matriculated from Westerford High School and then attended the University of Cape Town, completing a BA degree in 1988 and an LLB in 1991. She was admitted as an attorney in 1994. In 1997 she completed an LLM at the University of Notre Dame in the USA.

== Legal career ==
During the 1994 general election, Savage worked as deputy director of mediation services at the Western Cape office of the Independent Electoral Commission. In 1995 she was employed as a legal researcher by the Constitutional Commission of the African National Congress during the negotiation of the Constitution of South Africa. In 1996 she joined the Legal Resources Centre as an attorney. From 1997 to 2000 she was a full-time commissioner of the Commission for Conciliation, Mediation and Arbitration, a tribunal which adjudicates labour disputes.

In 2000 Savage opened her own law firm, Katharine Savage Attorneys, now Haffegee Roskam Savage Attorneys. In 2008 she became a director of Bowman Gilfillan, before returning to Haffegee Roskam Savage in 2012.

== Judicial career ==
Savage served as an acting judge of the Labour Court in 2011, and nine terms as an acting judge of the Western Cape Division of the High Court from 2012 to 2014. She was appointed to a permanent seat on the bench of the Western Cape Division with effect from 1 January 2015.

During her time at the Western Cape Division, Savage also served at various times as an acting judge of the Labour Appeal Court and the Supreme Court of Appeal. She was appointed to a permanent position at the Labour Appeal Court with effect from 1 January 2024. During 2025 she served as an acting judge of the Constitutional Court.

In October 2025 Savage was interviewed by the Judicial Service Commission for a vacant seat on the Constitutional Court bench. On 10 April 2026, President Cyril Ramaphosa announced that Savage and Nambitha Dambuza were appointed to the Constitutional Court with effect from 1 May 2026.
