= Banjō Ginga =

Japanese actor, voice actor and narrator

- 銀河 万丈
- Born: Takashi Tanaka (田中 崇); Kofu, Yamanashi, Japan
- Occupations: Actor; voice actor; narrator
- Years active: 1970–present
- Agent: Aoni Production
- Spouse: Gara Takashima

Banjō Ginga (銀河 万丈, Ginga Banjō), sometimes credited as his real name Takashi Tanaka (田中 崇, Tanaka Takashi), is a Japanese actor, voice actor and narrator who was born in Kofu, Yamanashi. Ginga is affiliated with Aoni Production. He is married to voice actress Gara Takashima.

Known for his deep baritone voice, his most well-known roles include Gihren Zabi (Mobile Suit Gundam), Crocodine (Dragon Quest: Dai no Daibōken), Jean Paul Rocchina (Armored Trooper Votoms), Shōhei Harada (Touch), Souther (Fist of the North Star, original 1980s series), Babbo (MÄR), Bayman in the Dead or Alive series, Heihachi Mishima and the various models of Jack in the Tekken series, and Liquid Snake and Zero in the Metal Gear series.

On November 5, 2020, it was announced Ginga had tested positive for COVID-19. On November 16, 2020, it was announced that he had recovered.

== Filmography ==
=== Television animation ===
1975

- Grendizer - Zuril

1977

- Planet Robot Danguard Ace – Doppler

1978

- Daikengo – Doctor Gudda, Emperor Mazeran
- The Perrine Story – Theodor
- Muteki Kōjin Daitarn 3 – Neros

1979

- Entaku no Kishi Monogatari: Moero Arthur – Labick
- Mobile Suit Gundam – Gihren Zabi, Cozun Graham
- Koguma no Misha – Misha's Father
- Cyborg 009 – Geronimo Junior/005, Vishnu

1980

- Space Warrior Baldios – Alan, King Bado
- Astro Boy – Gallon
- Densetsu Kyojin Ideon – Damido Pecchi
- Mahou Shoujo Lalabel – Viscous
- Moero Arthur: Hakuba no Oji – Labick

1981

- Swiss Family Robinson – Edward
- Galaxy Cyclone Braiger – Rasputin
- Tiger Mask II – Antonio Inoki
- Taiyou no Kiba Dougram – Chico
- Dr. Slump – Mr. Kimidori
- Hello! Sandybell – Edward

1982

- Ai no Senshi Rainbowman – Heinz Shousa
- Ochamegami Monogatari Korokoro Poron – Poseidan
- Armored Fleet Dairugger XV – Caponero, Mack Chukker
- Galactic Gale Baxinger – Geruba Zorba
- The Kabocha Wine – Dekkin
- Space Adventure Cobra – Col. Velga
- Sentō Mecha Xabungle – Fatman Big, Narrator, Timp
- Fuku-chan – Mr. Arakuma

1983

- Genesis Climber Mospeada – Jonathan Wolf
- Armored Trooper Votoms – Jan Paul Rocchina, Narration
- The Super Dimension Century Orguss – Jabby, Narrator
- Nanako SOS – Dr. Ishikawa

1984

- Panzer World Galient – Council of Legislators
- Heavy Metal L-Gaim – Maph McTomin
- Fist of the North Star – Souther, Fake Yuda, Resistance Leader
- Star Musketeer Bismark – Zatola
- The Super Dimension Cavalry Southern Cross – Georges Sullivan
- Lupin III: Part III – Arnold Oosa
- Galactic Patrol Lensman – Ban Baskark

1985

- Konpora Kid – Shinryuu Kyoutou
- A Little Princess Sara – Ralph
- Touch – Shohei Harada
- Dancougar - Super Beast Machine God – Alan
- Hai Step Jun – Oohata-sensei

1986

- Ai Shoujo Pollyanna Monogatari – Pendelton
- Uchūsen Sagittarius – Ganre, Franken
- Ginga Nagareboshi Gin – Riki
- Sangokushi II: Tenkakeru Hideotachi – Xiahou Yuan
- Dragon Ball – Bora, Colonel Silver, Giran
- Bosco Adventure – Hoodman

1987

- Around the World with Willy Fog – Willy Fog
- ESPer Mami – Narrator
- City Hunter – Harukawa
- Saint Seiya – Cassios, Jango
- Transformers: The Headmasters – Scorponok/Mega Zarak
- Highschool! Kimengumi – Hitoma Rokujō
- Bug tte Honey – Analog Satan, King Juriden
- Mister Ajikko – Aji Shogun

1988

- Sakigake!! Otoko Juku – J
- Tatakae!! Ramenman – Hogan, Jinlong (Kinryū)
- Sonic Soldier Borgman – Gilbert Mesh
- Transformers: Super God Masterforce – Black Zarak
- Himitsu no Akko-chan – Ken'ichirou Gagami

1989

- Obocchama-kun – Kamemitsu Obō
- Jungle Book Shōnen Mowgli – Baloo
- Transformers: Victory – Clamp's Father
- Dragon Ball Z – Bora, King Vegeta, Moai
- Madō King Granzort – Giant

1990

- Pygmalio – Agnard
- Transformers: Zone - BlackZarak

1991

- Dragon Quest: Dai no Daibōken – Crocodine
- Nadia the Secret of Blue Water – Voice of the Red Noah
- Moero! Top Striker – Robson

1993

- Kenyū Densetsu Yaiba – Onick
- Tanoshii Willow Town – Narrator

1995

- Street Fighter II V – Sagat
- Sorcerer Hunters – Saj Torte, Narrator

1996

- Kaiketsu Zorro – Sabato
- The Vision of Escaflowne – Adelphos

1997

- Kindaichi Shounen no Jikenbo – Minamiyama

1998

- Eat-Man '98 – Senator Sharif
- Detective Conan – Tsuneaki Niikura
- Yu-Gi-Oh! – Doctor

1999

- Cowboy Bebop – "Mad Pierrot" Tongpu
- Himitsu no Akko-chan – Antonio Baba
- Master of Mosquiton '99 – Frankie Negger
- Blue Gender – Dice Quaid (Episode 7–9)
- One Piece – Axe Morgan

2000

- Cyborg Kuro-chan – Ahab

2001

- Vandread: The Second Stage – Kokopeli
- Noir – Remy Breffort
- Kirby: Right Back at Ya! – N.M.E. Sales Guy, eNeMeE
- Run=Dim – Sōichi Yagihara

2002

- Tenshi na Konamaiki – Megumi Amatsuka's father

2003

- Astro Boy – Police Inspector Tawashi

2004

- F-Zero Falcon Densetsu – Blood Falcon
- Onmyou Taisenki – Mikazuchi, Narrator
- Cromartie High School – Narrator (ep 23)
- Viewtiful Joe – Captain Blue
- Monster – Rosso
- Yugo the Negotiator – Ali

2005

- The Law of Ueki – Baron
- Onmyou Taisenki – Akagane no Itsumu
- GUNxSWORD – Narrator
- Gallery Fake – Professor Maruyama
- Eureka Seven – Greg "Dr. Bear" Eagan
- Shinshaku Sengoku Eiyū Densetsu - Sanada Jū Yūshi The Animation – Matabei Mototsugu Goto
- MÄR – Babbo

2006

- Ergo Proxy – Intelligence Bureau Chief
- 009-1 – Phantom
- Black Lagoon – Verrocchio
- Black Lagoon: The Second Barrage – Verrocchio
- Bartender – Ryuuichi Minegishi

2007

- Hero Tales – Keirō
- Deltora Quest – The Shadow Lord
- Bamboo Blade – Narrator (ep 11)

2008

- Black Butler – Damiano
- Kurozuka (novel) – Kurumasou
- Golgo 13 – Sabine Brother Elder
- Hell Girl: Three Vessels – Norisha Takasugi
- Scarecrowman – Ernest
- Psychic Squad – Elec Teru
- Hakaba Kitarō – Dr. Gamotsu

2009

- Kiddy Girl-and – Ascoeur (male)
- Gintama – Hōsen
- Chrome Shelled Regios – Ryuhou Gash
- Golgo 13 – Spartacus
- The Girl Who Leapt Through Space – Nerval
- Birdy the Mighty Decode:02 – Agrazume
- One Piece – Scarlet

2010

- Fairy Tail – Jude Heartfilia
- Beyblade: Metal Masters – African DJ

2011

- Ghastly Prince Enma Burning Up – Kan Tengu
- Toriko – Yosaku
- Nichijou – Narrator

2012

- Toriko – Baidan

2013

- Kyousougiga – God, Narrator
- Hayate the Combat Butler! Cuties – Armageddon
- Maoyu – Old Archer

2014

- La Corda d'Oro Blue Sky – Genichi Tōgane
- Space Dandy – Commodore Perry
- Marvel Disk Wars: The Avengers – Magneto
- D-Frag! – Narrator (ep 8)
- Hunter × Hunter – Isaac Netero (eps 122–126)
- Hero Bank – Sennen
- Momokyun Sword – Jakiō
- One Piece – Riku Dold III (eps 666+)

2015

- Mysterious Joker – Jason
- Blood Blockade Battlefront – Gilbert F. Altstein
- Food Wars! Shokugeki no Soma – Senzaemon Nakiri
- JoJo's Bizarre Adventure: Stardust Crusaders – Daniel J. D'Arby
- Seiyu's Life! – Himself
- Magical Somera-chan – General
- Fist of the North Star: Strawberry Flavor – Souther

2017

- Magical Circle Guru Guru – Deemon Lord Giri (ep 16, 23 - 24)

2018

- GeGeGe no Kitarō 6th series – Nanashi (eps 1 - 3, 11 - 12, 19, 25, 27, 35 - 37, 42, 47 - 48, )
- Baki - Dorian

2020

- Listeners – Robert

2021

- Night Head 2041 – Kyōjirō Mikuriya

2024

- Solo Leveling – Go Gunhee

2025

- #Compass 2.0: Combat Providence Analysis System – Thomas
- Teogonia – Valley God

2026

- Drops of God – Yutaka Kanzaki

=== Original video animation (OVA) ===
- Transformers: Scramble City (1986) – Ultra Magnus
- The Guyver: Bio-Booster Armor (1989) – Gaster
- 3×3 Eyes (1991–1992) – Steve Long
- Legend of the Galactic Heroes (1992) – De Villiers
- Konpeki no Kantai (1993) – Admiral Eisaku Takasugi
- Macross Plus (1994) – Raymond
- Mobile Suit Gundam: The 08th MS Team (1996) – Gihren Zabi
- Slayers (1996) – Randy's wizard
- Final Fantasy VII: Advent Children (2005) – Reeve Tuesti
- Mobile Suit Gundam: The Origin (2015) – Gihren Zabi
- Golden Kamuy (2019) – Kiichirō Wakayama

=== Theatrical animation ===
- Mobile Suit Gundam (1981) – Gihren Zabi
- Mobile Suit Gundam: Encounters in Space (1982) – Gihren Zabi
- Lupin III: The Plot of the Fuma Clan (1987) – Daisuke Jigen
- Neo Tokyo (1987) – Zack Hugh
- Dragon Ball: Mystical Adventure (1988) – Bora
- Dragon Ball Z: The Tree of Might (1990) – Armond
- Lupin III: Dead or Alive (1996) – Headhunting General
- Elmer's Adventure: My Father's Dragon (1997) – Tiger
- Doraemon: Nobita in the Robot Kingdom (2002) – Robbie
- Doraemon: Nobita's New Great Adventure into the Underworld (2007) – Demon King
- Crayon Shin-chan: The Storm Called: The Hero of Kinpoko (2008) – Sweat duct Dark
- The Mystical Laws (2012)
- Kingsglaive: Final Fantasy XV (2016) – Clarus Amicitia
- Dragon Ball Super: Broly (2018) – King Vegeta
- Crayon Shin-chan: Honeymoon Hurricane ~The Lost Hiroshi~ (2019)
- Gold Kingdom and Water Kingdom (2023) – Rastavan III
- Spy × Family Code: White (2023) – Snyder
- Detective Conan: The Million Dollar Pentagram (2024) – Brian D. Kadokura
- The Rose of Versailles (2025) – General Jarjayes

=== Video games ===
Year	Title	Role	Console	Source
1989	Ys: Book I and II	Darm	PC Engine CD-ROM²	
1990	Cosmic Fantasy: Bōken Shōnen Yū	Gaia	PC Engine CD-ROM²	
1991	Ys III: Wanderers from Ys	Demanicus/Narrator	PC Engine CD-ROM²	
1993	Ys IV: The Dawn of Ys	Darm	PC Engine CD-ROM²	
1994	Tekken	Heihachi Mishima, Ganryu, Jack, Prototype Jack	Arcade, PlayStation	
1995	Tekken 2	Jack-2, Prototype Jack	Arcade, PlayStation	
1996	Street Fighter EX	Cracker Jack	Arcade, PlayStation	
1997	Tekken 3	Gun Jack	Arcade, PlayStation	
1997	Tobal 2	Doctor V	PlayStation	
1998	Street Fighter EX2	Cracker Jack	Arcade, PlayStation	
1998	Soulcalibur	Astaroth	Arcade, Dreamcast, iOS, Xbox 360, Android	
1998	Metal Gear Solid	Liquid Snake	PlayStation, Microsoft Windows	
1999	Tekken Tag Tournament	Jack-2, Gun Jack, Prototype Jack	Arcade, PlayStation 2	
2000	Dead or Alive 2	Bayman	Arcade, Dreamcast, PlayStation 2	
2000	Street Fighter EX3	Cracker Jack	PlayStation 2	
2000	Super Robot Wars Alpha	Gihren Zabi	PlayStation, Dreamcast	
2000	Star Trek: Deep Space Nine: The Fallen	Worf (Japanese dub)	Microsoft Windows, Mac OS	
2000	Mobile Suit Gundam: Journey to Jaburo	Gihren Zabi	PlayStation 2	
2001	Eithéa	Vamoor	PlayStation	
2001	Super Robot Wars Alpha Gaiden	Fatman Big, Timp Sharon	PlayStation	
2001	Dead or Alive 3	Bayman	Xbox	
2001	Metal Gear Solid 2: Sons of Liberty	Liquid Snake	PlayStation 2	
2002	Kingdom Hearts	Clayton	PlayStation 2	
2003	Mobile Suit Gundam: Encounters in Space	Gihren Zabi	PlayStation 2	
2004	Ninja Gaiden	Murai	Xbox, PlayStation 3, PlayStation Vita	
2004	Shin Megami Tensei: Digital Devil Saga	Baron Omega	PlayStation 2	
2004	Tekken 5	Jack-5	Arcade, PlayStation 2	
2004	Metal Gear Solid 3: Snake Eater	Zero	PlayStation 2	
2004	Super Robot Wars GC	Gihren Zabi, MF McTobin	Nintendo GameCube, Xbox 360	
2005	Shin Megami Tensei: Digital Devil Saga 2	Colonel Terrence E. Beck	PlayStation 2	
2005	Saint Seiya: The Sanctuary	Cassios	PlayStation 2	
2005	3rd Super Robot Wars Alpha: To the End of the Galaxy	Damido Pechi	PlayStation 2	
2005	Shadow Hearts: From the New World	Frank Goldfinger	PlayStation 2	
2005	Hokuto no Ken: Shinpan no Sōsōsei Kengō Retsuden	Souther	PlayStation 2	
2005	Dead or Alive 4	Bayman	Xbox 360	
2006	Enchanted Arms	Infinity	Xbox 360, PlayStation 3	
2006	Dirge of Cerberus: Final Fantasy VII	Reeve Tuesti	PlayStation 2	
2006	The Legend of Heroes VI: Trails in the Sky	Don Capua	Android, iOS, Microsoft Windows, PlayStation Portable, PlayStation 3, PlayStation Vita	
2006	Metal Gear Solid: Portable Ops	Zero	PlayStation Portable, PlayStation Vita	
2007	The Legend of Heroes: Trails in the Sky the 3rd	Don Capua	Android, iOS, Microsoft Windows, PlayStation Portable, PlayStation 3, PlayStation Vita	
2007	Dragon Ball Z: Budokai Tenkaichi 3	King Vegeta		
2007	Final Fantasy IV DS	Fusoya, Kluya	Nintendo DS, iOS, Android, Microsoft Windows	
2008	Metal Gear Solid 4: Guns of the Patriots	Liquid Ocelot	PlayStation 3	
2008	Metal Gear Online	Liquid Ocelot	PlayStation 3, Arcade	
2008	Super Robot Wars A Portable	Science Minister Zuril	PlayStation Portable	
2008	Dragon Ball: Origins	Giran	Nintendo DS	
2008	Sands of Destruction	Azure Sea	Nintendo DS	
2008	Super Robot Wars Z	Fatman Big, Jabby, Timp Sharon	PlayStation 2	
2008	Phantasy Star 0	Dairon	Nintendo DS	
2009	Infinite Space	Valantin	Nintendo DS	
2009	Dragon Ball: Revenge of King Piccolo	Colonel Silver, Bora	Wii	
2010	Valkyria Chronicles II	Gilbert Gassenarl	PlayStation Portable	
2010	Heavy Rain	Scott Shelby (Japanese dub)	PlayStation 3, PlayStation 4, Microsoft Windows	
2010	Castlevania: Lords of Shadow	Cornell	Microsoft Windows, PlayStation 3, Xbox 360	
2011	2nd Super Robot Wars Z	Fatman Big, Timp Sharon	PlayStation Portable	
2011	Dead or Alive: Dimensions	Bayman	Nintendo 3DS	
2011	Tales of Xillia	Dillack Mathis	PlayStation 3	
2011	Saint Seiya: Sanctuary Battle	Cassios	PlayStation 3	
2012	Devil Summoner: Soul Hackers	Victor	Nintendo 3DS	
2012	Dead or Alive 5	Bayman	Xbox 360, PlayStation 3	
2012	Tales of Xillia 2	Dillack Mathis	PlayStation 3	
2013	Dynasty Warriors: Gundam Reborn	Gihren Zabi	PlayStation 3, PlayStation Vita	
2015	Dragon Quest: Heroes	King Dirk	PlayStation 3, PlayStation 4, Microsoft Windows, Nintendo Switch	
2015	One Piece: Pirate Warriors 3	Morgan	PlayStation 3, PlayStation 4, PlayStation Vita, Windows, Nintendo Switch	
2015	Metal Gear Solid V: The Phantom Pain	Zero	Microsoft Windows, PlayStation 3, PlayStation 4, Xbox 360, Xbox One	
2015	Saint Seiya: Soldiers' Soul	Cassios	PlayStation 3, PlayStation 4, Microsoft Windows	
2015	JoJo's Bizarre Adventure: Eyes of Heaven	Daniel J. D'arby	PlayStation 3, PlayStation 4	
2017	Fire Emblem Heroes	Duma	Android, iOS	
2017	Fire Emblem Echoes: Shadows of Valentia	Duma	Nintendo 3DS	
2017	Dragon Quest Rivals	Estark	Android, iOS, Nintendo Switch	
2018	Gintama Rumble	Housen	PlayStation 4, PlayStation Vita	
2019	Dead or Alive 6	Bayman	Arcade, Microsoft Windows, PlayStation 4, Xbox One	
2019	Super Kirby Clash	Parallel Nightmare	Nintendo Switch	
2020	Dragon Ball Z: Kakarot	Toolo	Microsoft Windows, Nintendo Switch, PlayStation 4, PlayStation 5, Stadia, Xbox One, Xbox Series X/S	
2020	Final Fantasy VII Remake	Reeve Tuesti	PlayStation 4	
2021	Super Robot Wars 30	MF McTomin	Microsoft Windows, Nintendo Switch, PlayStation 4	
2022	Live A Live	Odie O'Bright	Microsoft Windows, Nintendo Switch, PlayStation 4, PlayStation 5	
2022	Soul Hackers 2	Victor	Microsoft Windows, PlayStation 4, PlayStation 5, Xbox One, Xbox Series X/S	
2023	Ys Memoire: The Oath in Felghana	Narrator	Nintendo Switch	
2024	Solo Leveling: Arise	Kiyoomi Goto	Android, iOS, Microsoft Windows	
2024	Final Fantasy VII Rebirth	Reeve Tuesti	PlayStation 5	
2024	Emio – The Smiling Man: Famicom Detective Club	Site Foreman	Nintendo Switch	
2024	Metaphor: ReFantazio	Hythlodaeus V	Microsoft Windows, PlayStation 4, PlayStation 5, Xbox Series X/S	
2025	Raidou Remastered: The Mystery of the Soulless Army	Dr. Victor	Microsoft Windows, Nintendo Switch, Nintendo Switch 2, PlayStation 4, PlayStation 5, Xbox Series X/S	
2025	Metal Gear Solid Delta: Snake Eater	Zero	Microsoft Windows, PlayStation 5, Xbox Series X/S	
2025	Kirby Air Riders	Male Announcer & Narrator	Nintendo Switch 2	

- Ar tonelico: Melody of Elemia – Leard Barsett
- Ar tonelico II: Melody of Metafalica – Dr. Laude
- Blood Gear – Bey Eurct Degner
- Front Mission 5: Scars of the War – Morgan Bernard
- Granblue Fantasy – Eahta/Okto
- Gungrave – Zell Condorbrave
- Last Alert – Dr. Garcia
- Makeruna! Makendō 2 – Makenpo
- Rockman ZX Advent – Bifrost the Crocoroid
- Phantasy Star Online 2 – Schlegger Verun
- Shadow Hearts: From the New World – Frank Goldfinger
- Shadow the Hedgehog – Commander
- Shining Force EXA – Avalon
- Super Robot Wars Original Generations – Ruozorl Zoran Royell
- Tengai Makyō: Ziria – Gomon
- Crash Bandicoot N. Sane Trilogy — Koala Kong

=== Tokusatsu ===
- X-Bomber (1980) – Emperor Gelma, Kirara
- Choushinsei Flashman (1986) – Ley Baraki (ep 17 - 19)
- Kousoku Sentai Turboranger (1989) – Saint Beast Lakia (ep 2)
- Bakuryū Sentai Abaranger (2003) – Burstosaur Brachiosaurus (eps 1 - 17, 19 - 34, 36, 37, 39 - 50)
- Bakuryū Sentai Abaranger DELUXE: Abare Summer is Freezing Cold! (2003) – Burstosaur Brachiosaurus
- Bakuryū Sentai Abaranger vs. Hurricaneger (2004) – Burstosaur Brachiosaurus
- Ultraman Nexus (2004) - Dark Zagi/The Unknown Hand
- Tokusou Sentai Dekaranger vs. Abaranger (2005) – Burstosaur Brachiosaurus
- GoGo Sentai Boukenger (2006) – Gekkou of Illusion (eps 3, 5, 9, 12, 14, 17, 22, 25, 32, 35, 38, 40–42, 44, 46, 49)
- GoGo Sentai Boukenger The Movie: The Greatest Precious (2006) – Gekkou of Illusion
- Samurai Sentai Shinkenger vs. Go-onger: GinmakuBang!! (2010) – Pollution President Batcheed
- Kamen Rider OOO (2011) – Ika-Jaguar Yummy (ep 27 - 28)
- Kaizoku Sentai Gokaiger (2011) – Pollution President Babatcheed (ep 35 - 36)
- Kaizoku Sentai Gokaiger vs. Space Sheriff Gavan: The Movie (2012) – Gekkou of Illusion
- Kikai Sentai Zenkaiger (2021) - Zenryoku Zenkai Cannon (eps 30 - 49)

=== Dubbing roles ===
==== Live-action ====
- Michael Dorn
  - Star Trek: The Next Generation – Worf
  - Star Trek: Deep Space Nine – Worf
  - Star Trek: First Contact – Worf
  - Star Trek: Insurrection – Worf
  - Star Trek: Nemesis – Worf
  - Ted 2 – Rick
- Michael Clarke Duncan
  - The Green Mile (2002 Fuji TV edition) – John Coffey
  - See Spot Run – Murdoch
  - The Scorpion King – Balthazar
  - Sin City – Manute
  - CSI: NY – Quinn Sullivan
- Josh Brolin
  - Guardians of the Galaxy – Thanos
  - Avengers: Age of Ultron – Thanos
  - Avengers: Infinity War – Thanos
  - Avengers: Endgame – Thanos
- Delroy Lindo
  - Broken Arrow (1999 NTV edition) – USAF Colonel Max Wilkins
  - A Life Less Ordinary – Jackson
  - Romeo Must Die – Isaak O'Day
  - The Core (2005 TV Asahi edition) – Dr. Edward "Braz" Brazzelton
- Keith David
  - Marked for Death (1995 TV Asahi edition) – Max Keller
  - Article 99 – Luther Jermoe
  - The Quick and the Dead (1997 TV Asahi edition) – Sgt. Clay Cantrell
  - Armageddon (2002 Fuji TV edition) – General Kimsey
- Tony Todd
  - Final Destination – William Bludworth
  - Final Destination 2 – William Bludworth
  - Final Destination 3 – The Devil
  - Transformers: Revenge of the Fallen – The Fallen
- Cary-Hiroyuki Tagawa
  - Mortal Kombat – Shang Tsung
  - Tekken – Heihachi Mishima
  - Tekken 2: Kazuya's Revenge – Heihachi Mishima
- The Adventures of Huck Finn – Jim (Courtney B. Vance)
- A.I. Artificial Intelligence – Teddy (Jack Angel)
- Bad Boys – Fouchet (Tchéky Karyo)
- Best Sellers – Harris Shaw (Michael Caine)
- Blade II (2005 TV Tokyo edition) – Reinhardt (Ron Perlman)
- Bringing Out the Dead – Marcus (Ving Rhames)
- Chain Reaction (1999 TV Asahi edition) – FBI Agent Leon Ford (Fred Ward)
- The Day After – Billy McCoy (William Allen Young)
- Desperate Housewives – Ian Hainsworth (Dougray Scott)
- Dressed to Kill – Bobby (Michael Caine)
- Dumbo – Baritone Bates (Michael Buffer)
- Fearless Hyena Part II – Heaven Devil
- First Blood (1993 Fuji TV edition) – John Rambo (Sylvester Stallone)
- Game of Death – Hakim (Kareem Abdul-Jabbar)
- Get Shorty – Ray "Bones" Barboni (Dennis Farina)
- The Godfather (2001 DVD edition) – Virgil "The Turk" Sollozzo (Al Lettieri)
- Godzilla – Philippe Roaché (Jean Reno)
- The Great Escape (2000 TV Tokyo edition) – Flight Lieutenant Danny Welinski (Charles Bronson)
- The Hobbit: The Desolation of Smaug – Master of Lake-town (Stephen Fry)
- Holy Man – G (Eddie Murphy)
- Indiana Jones and the Last Crusade (2009 WOWOW edition) – Henry Jones Sr. (Sean Connery)
- It's Complicated – Adam Schaffer (Steve Martin)
- Jaws 2 (2022 BS Tokyo edition) – Mayor Larry Vaughn (Murray Hamilton)
- Live and Let Die (1988 TBS edition) – Baron Samedi (Geoffrey Holder)
- The Magnificent Seven (2013 Star Channel edition) – Harry Luck (Brad Dexter)
- The Man in the Iron Mask – Porthos (Gérard Depardieu)
- Moonraker (1984 TBS edition) – Jaws (Richard Kiel)
- Mortal Engines – Magnus Crome (Patrick Malahide)
- Nick of Time – Huey The Shoes Shine Man (Charles S. Dutton)
- Ocean's Twelve (2007 NTV edition) – Frank Catton (Bernie Mac)
- The Rainbow Thief (2017 Blu-ray edition) – Prince Meleagre (Peter O'Toole)
- Raw Deal (1988 TBS edition) – Sheriff Mark Kaminski / Joseph P. Brenner (Arnold Schwarzenegger)
- The Shawshank Redemption (1997 TBS edition) – Byron Hadley (Clancy Brown)
- Sherlock Holmes: A Game of Shadows – Mycroft Holmes (Stephen Fry)
- Sin City: A Dame to Kill For – Manute (Dennis Haysbert)
- Speed – Lieutenant "Mac" McMahon (Joe Morton)
- Spider-Man 2 – Otto "Doctor Octopus" Octavius (Alfred Molina)
- Spider-Man: No Way Home – Otto "Doctor Octopus" Octavius (Alfred Molina)
- Stealing Beauty – Alex Parrish (Jeremy Irons)
- Stuart Little – Crenshaw Little (Jeffrey Jones)
- Steel – John Henry Irons/Steel (Shaquille O'Neal)
- The Tiger: An Old Hunter's Tale – Chun Man-Duk (Choi Min-sik)
- Tortured – Archie Green (Laurence Fishburne)
- Twin Peaks – Sheriff Harry S. Truman (Michael Ontkean)
- Underdog – Dan Unger (Jim Belushi)

==== Animation ====
- Atlantis: The Lost Empire – Dr. Joshua Sweet
- Atlantis: Milo's Return - Dr. Joshua Sweet
- Batman: The Animated Series – Killer Croc
- The Boss Baby – Wizzie
- The Boss Baby: Family Business – Wizzie
- The Dark Crystal – General
- Hop – Mr. Bunny
- Lightyear – Emperor Zurg
- Minions & Monsters – Frank and Elwood
- Planes: Fire & Rescue – Skipper Riley
- The Secret Life of Pets – Pops
- The Secret Life of Pets 2 – Pops
- Small Soldiers – Chip Hazard
- The SpongeBob SquarePants Movie – King Neptune
- Tarzan – Clayton
- Transformers Animated (TV Tokyo dub) – Ultra Magnus
- What If...? – Thanos
- X-Men (TV Tokyo dub) - Omega Red

==== Other ====
- Teddy Ruxpin: Grubby
