= Panzer World Galient =

Japanese anime television series

- Cover of the Premium Blu-ray Box release, depicting the two titular mecha of the series. Top: Assault Galient. Bottom: Tetsukyojin.

機甲界ガリアン (Kikōkai Garian)
- Genre: High fantasy, Mecha, Steampunk, Military sci-fi
- Anime television series
- Directed by: Ryōsuke Takahashi
- Written by: Sōji Yoshikawa
- Music by: Tooru Fuyuki
- Studio: Nippon Sunrise
- Licensed by: Sentai Filmworks
- Original network: Nippon Television
- Original run: October 5, 1984 – March 29, 1985
- Episodes: 25
- Anime film series

Chapter of the Land and the Sky (compilation films)
- Directed by: Ryōsuke Takahashi
- Written by: Sōji Yoshikawa
- Music by: Tooru Fuyuki
- Studio: Nippon Sunrise
- Licensed by: Sentai Filmworks
- Released: January 21, 1986 – March 25, 1986
- Runtime: 70 minutes (each)
- Films: 2
- Original video animation

Crest of Iron
- Directed by: Masashi Ikeda
- Written by: Jinzo Toriumi
- Music by: Seiji Yokoyama
- Studio: Nippon Sunrise
- Licensed by: Sentai Filmworks
- Released: August 5, 1986
- Runtime: 55 minutes

Panzer World Galient (機甲界ガリアン, Kikōkai Garian) is a 1984 Japanese fantasy and science fiction anime television series produced by Sunrise. It was directed by Ryōsuke Takahashi and written by Sōji Yoshikawa with mechanical design by Kunio Okawara and Yutaka Izubuchi. It aired on Nippon Television in Japan from October 5, 1984, to March 29, 1985, lasted up to 25 episodes. It is the third installment of the Takahashi Mecha Trilogy, following both Armored Trooper Votoms and Fang of the Sun Dougram, respectively.

== Plot ==
Set in the medieval-looking fantasy world of Arst, Prince Jordy Volder takes up the fight against the conqueror Marder. Jordy uses the legendary giant robot "panzer" Galient, which is one of many panzers preserved underground for millennia. Using an army of advanced robot panzers, Marder is conquering Arst in preparation to dominate the Crescent Galaxy.

20,000 years ago, The Federation of Advanced Civilizations gave up violence, buried all their weapons beneath the planet Arst, and then teleported to another galaxy to live risk-free lives on artificial planets. The people became totally apathetic, not even caring about self-preservation, and mindlessly perform society's functions with no feeling at all. A handful of their citizens are Inspectors, people who monitor nonadvanced civilizations for trouble by going down to the surface covertly. About 12 years ago, Mardoul attempted an unsuccessful coup to try and rally the Lacplate people (of the Federation) to throw off their stupor and become a red-blooded conquering species again and was exiled with his followers to the now middle ages-style Arst.

Mardoul quickly conquers Arst with his advanced technology and digs up Arst looking for the buried weapons of yesteryear. Jordy Vorder, crown prince of the conquered Vorder Kingdom, trains under his father's top retainer to defeat Mardoul and retake his birthright. A chance discovery of the buried mecha Galient, most powerful of all the buried weaopns, This power lets Jordy defend the White Valley against repeated attacks by Mardoul's army. Hilmocha tricks Jordy into following her to Mardoul's digsite by kidnapping his love interest Chururu, where he learns more of Mardoul's conspiracy as well as meeting the thief Window. Hilmocha takes her findings to her Federation superiors, who decree she has violated a non-intervention law and plan on executing her. She escapes and continues to help the rebel army. Jordy discovers his mother is still alive, exactly how she was on the night of the conquest, and makes a failed attempt to rescue her. Mardoul asks Jordy to switch sides, Jordy successfully escapes.

Several failed all-out assault on the White Valley leaves Mardoul's forces vulnerable enough to counterattack, and more forces rally to White Valley's side to resist Mardoul's oppression. After failing to convert Jordy to his cause a second time and a failed coup attempt, Mardoul makes a panicked decision to enact his secret plan early: using a gravity manipulating artifact hooked up to the remains of his ship's power supply, Mardoul can teleport his castle to his homeworld and do as much violence as possible. He hopes to use violence to wake them up from their stupor and convert them into a new galactic empire for conquest. Rather than accept defeat, the Federation uses a gravity weapon to completely destroy the planet with emotionally-affected citizens. Realizing he has no chance of success, Mardoul throws himself into space. Jordy, Chururu, Hilmocha, Window, and the rest of the Arstians capture the castle and teleports it back to Arst before the planet is destroyed.

The final episode ended with a tighter daylight shot on the sword that pans to the handle. Prince Jordy's hand then pulls the sword from the sand and lifts it in the air and we see him embracing Chururu. The credits flash onscreen as the Prince and Chururu look at each other while the images of the prince's mother and friends appear onscreen with rose petals blowing in the wind completing the ending.

== Theme music ==
- Opening Theme: "The Galient World – Run For Your Life" by EUROX
- Ending Theme: "Hoshi no Ichibyō" (lit. "A Second of a Star") by EUROX

The show's opening and ending musical themes were composed and performed by EUROX, a Japanese progressive rock band formed in 1984 in Tokyo. They did English versions of both songs with mostly different lyrics. They also did a 2009 remake of both songs in both languages.

The ending theme was normally accompanied by nighttime shots of a sword stuck in the sand and images of the characters reflected on its blade as the credits flash with the ending showing the same sword now showered with rain (as reference to a line in the song about crying).
