= Aesop's World =

Japanese anime television series

- イソップワールド
- Genre: Anime, Adventure, Fantasy
- Developed by: Eiji Yamanaka
- Directed by: Masami Hata; Mitsuo Kobayashi
- Country of origin: Japan
- Original language: Japanese
- No. of episodes: 26

Production
- Producers: Hironori Nakagawa; Kinuyo Nozaki
- Production company: Sunrise

Original release
- Network: TXN (TV Tokyo)
- Release: April 5 – December 31, 1999

Aesop's World (イソップワールド, Isoppu Wārudo) is an anime series by Sunrise that aired on TV Tokyo.

The series' characters include Picco, Tocho, and Fufu, three animals who aim to recover the mystical scales of a fish, Aesop - that way Aesop will be able to fly again.

== Characters ==
The main characters in Aesop World include:

- Aesop - The main character of the series. It is a mysterious giant fish that flies in the sky. It used to fly around the world, but for many years it has become impossible to fly by dropping scales.
- Picco - a female hamster. Naughty at times, but she is curious and cheerful.
- Tocho - a male platypus. He is gentle and strong and good at swimming, but can be very gluttonous at times and motivated as soon as food is involved.
- Fufu - a male ferret. A little weak and nice. Knowingly, his head spins quickly and comes up with various strategies.
