= Ryōsuke Takahashi =

Japanese film director

Ryosuke Takahashi
- 高橋 良輔
- Born: 髙橋 良輔; January 11, 1943 (age 83); Adachi-ku, Tokyo, Japan
- Other names: Hannome no Wasohachi (奇数 和十八), et al
- Occupations: Animation director, scriptwriter, producer
- Years active: 1964–present
- Notable work: Armored Trooper VOTOMS; Fang of the Sun Dougram; Blue Comet SPT Layzner

Ryōsuke Takahashi (高橋 良輔, Takahashi Ryōsuke; born January 11, 1943) is a Japanese anime director, screenwriter, and producer. He has worked for Sunrise on many anime shows in the real robot genre, including Armored Trooper VOTOMS, Fang of the Sun Dougram, Panzer World Galient, and Blue Comet SPT Layzner.

== Works ==
Year	Title	Role	Notes	Refs
1965	W3	Script, Production		
1967	Gokū no Daibōken	Production		
1967	Princess Knight	Production		
1967–68	Oraa Guzura Dado	Production, Storyboard	1st TV series	
1968	Animal 1 ja:アニマル1	Production		
1969	Dororo	Production		
1971	Wandering Sun	Production、Storyboard		
1971	Kunimatsu-sama no Otoridai ja:国松さまのお通りだい	Production		
1973–74	Zero Tester series	Chief Director, ED1「愛する大地」Lyrics		
1975	Kum-Kum	Continuity		
1977	Manga ijin monogatari ja:まんが偉人物語	Production		
1979–80	Cyborg 009	Director	2nd TV series	
1980	Astro Boy	Script	1980 TV series	
1981	The Sea Prince and the Fire Child	Setting cooperation	Feature film	
1981	Akuma to Himegimi ja:悪魔と姫ぎみ	Production	Feature film	
1981–83	Fang of the Sun Dougram	Script, Director, Production、Storyboard, Original work		
1983–84	Armored Trooper Votoms	Original creator, Director, Script, Storyboard		
1983	Choro-Q Dougram	Draft	Feature film	
1983	Dougram: Documentary of the Fang of the Sun	Draft, Director, ED「さらばやさしき日々よ」Lyrics	Feature film	
1984–85	Panzer World Galient	Draft, Director		
1985	Armored Trooper VOTOMS: The Last Red Shoulder	Original creator, Director	OVA	
1985–86	Blue Comet SPT Layzner	Original creator, Chief Director, Director, Script, Storyboard		
1986	Panzer World Galient	Production	OVA "Part III"	
1986	Armored Trooper VOTOMS: Big Battle	Original creator, Director	OVA	
1986	Blue Comet SPT Layzner	Original work, Director	OVA "Act. III"	
1987–88	Oraa Guzura Dado	Production, Storyboard	2nd TV series	
1988	Armored Trooper VOTOMS: The Red Shoulder Document: Roots of Ambition	Original creator, Director	OVA	
1988–89	Ronin Warriors	Series configuration		
1988–89	Armor Hunter Mellowlink	Original work, Series configuration	OVA	
1991	Eiyu Gaiden Mozaika ja:英雄凱伝モザイカ	Director	OVA	
1992	Mobile Suit Gundam 0083: Stardust Memory	Writer	OVA eps. 8-10	
1993	The Cockpit	Director	OVA ep. 3	
1993–2003	Konpeki no Kantai	Script	OVA	
1994	Armored Trooper VOTOMS: Shining Heresy ja:装甲騎兵ボトムズ 赫奕たる異端	Original work, Director	OVA	
1996–98	The Silent Service	Director	TV special	
1997–98	The King of Braves GaoGaiGar	Producer		
1997–2002	Kyokujitsu no Kantai	Script	OVA	
1998–99	Gasaraki	Original creator, Director		
1999–2000	Blue Gender	Original creator, Co-Director, Co-Writer	Television	
2000	Carried by the Wind: Tsukikage Ran	Script		
2004–05	Morizo series モリゾーとキッコロ	Director	2 seasons	
2004	Phoenix	Director		
2006	Flag	Original work, Series Director	OVA	
2006–07	Intrigue in the Bakumatsu – Irohanihoheto	Series Director, Original creator		
2007–08	Armored Trooper VOTOMS: Pailsen Files	Original work, Director	OVA, also movie version 2009	
2010	Armored Trooper VOTOMS: Phantom Chapter	Original work・Director	OVA	
2011	Armored Trooper VOTOMS: Alone Again	Director	OVA	
2012	Ozuma	Series Director		
2021	Muteking the Dancing Hero	Chief Director		
2024–present	The Fable	Director	2 seasons	
