= Sunrise (studio) =

Japanese animation studio

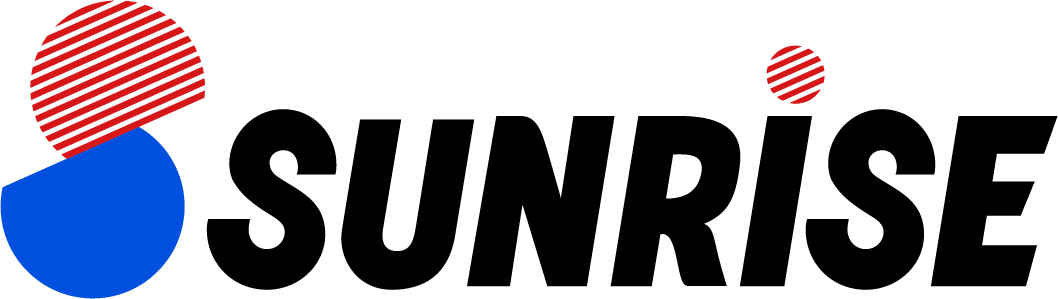
- Logo used since 2024

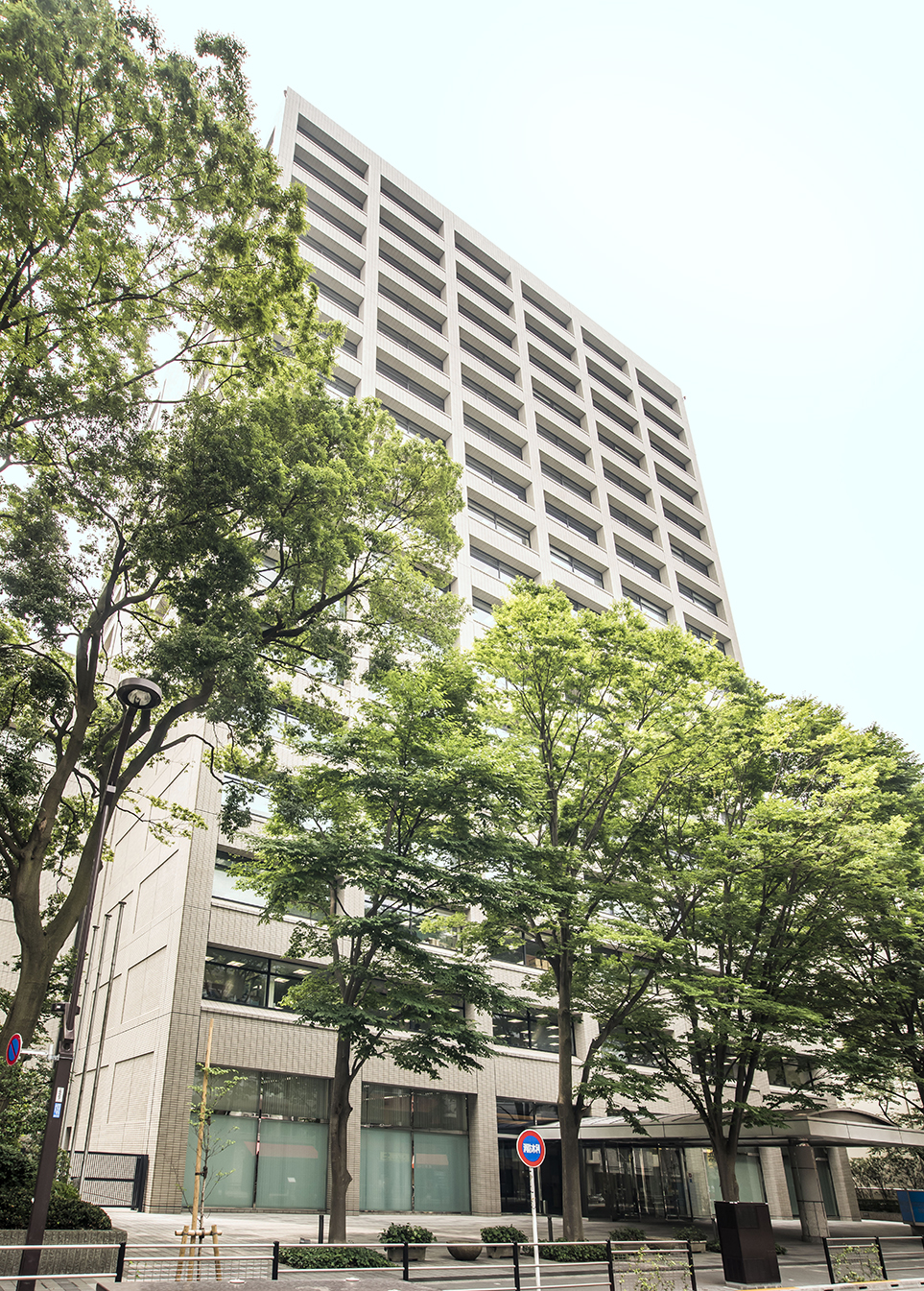
- Headquarters in Suginami, Tokyo
- Native name: サンライズ
- Romanized name: Sanraizu
- Formerly: Sunrise Studio (1972–1976); Nippon Sunrise (1976–1987)
- Type: Division
- Industry: Anime
- Founded: September 1972; 54 years ago
- Headquarters: Ogikubo, Suginami, Tokyo, Japan
- Owner: Bandai (1994–2005); Bandai Namco Holdings (2005–2022); Bandai Namco Filmworks (2022–present)
- Divisions: Sunrise Arte; Sunrise Animation School
- Website: sunrise-inc.co.jp

Sunrise (Japanese: サンライズ, Hepburn: Sanraizu; stylized in all caps and also branded as Sunrise Studios) is a Japanese animation studio, serving as the flagship division and the trade name for the IP Production Group unit of Bandai Namco Filmworks, a subsidiary of Bandai Namco Holdings. The division is responsible for the Sunrise label, focusing on animation production. Prior to 2022, Sunrise operated as a separate company with its production offices being under one roof. Sunrise started its operations as a company in September 1972 under the Sunrise Studio name. After its split from Shoeisha and film distributor Tohokushinsha in 1977, it was rebranded to Nippon Sunrise and took its current name in 1987. After 22 years as an independent studio, it was acquired by toy manufacturer Bandai in 1994 before merging with video game publishing company Namco to form Bandai Namco Holdings in 2005.

The studio has been involved in many critically acclaimed anime television series from original works to manga adaptations, including the Gundam series, the Mashin Hero Wataru series, the Brave and Eldran series, Code Geass, the City Hunter series, The Vision of Escaflowne, Aura Battler Dunbine, Blue Comet SPT Layzner, the Inuyasha series, the Love Live! series, Crest of the Stars among others.

Following the formation of Bandai Namco Filmworks in 2022, the Sunrise name was relegated to a division of the company (officially known as a "brand"), focusing on animation production while the general production offices were consolidated under BNF. The consolidation was structured as a rebrand of the existing Sunrise company.

Haro, from the Gundam series serves as the studio's mascot.

== History ==
=== Shoeisha/Tohokushinsha era ===
According to an interview with Sunrise members, the studio was founded by former members of Mushi Production in September 1972 as Sunrise Studio. Rather than having anime production revolve around a single creator (like Mushi, headed by Osamu Tezuka), Sunrise decided that production should focus on the producers. The market for mainstream anime (such as manga adaptations, sports shows, and adaptations of popular children's stories) was already dominated by existing companies, so Sunrise decided to focus on robot (mecha) anime, known to be more difficult to animate but which could be used to sell toys.

The founding members of Sunrise were seven people from Mushi Production's production and sales department: Yoshinori Kishimoto, Masanori Ito, Eiji Yamamoto, Yasuo Shibue, Masami Iwasaki, Kiyomi Numamoto, and Yasuhiko Yoneyama. However, when the anime production studio lacked funds for the new anime studio, Sunrise Studio sought investment from Japanese recording studio, film distributor & production company Tohokushinsha Film and planning and production company Shoeisha.

Although the founding members left Mushi Productions before its terminal bankruptcy, they also had insider knowledge of Mushi Production's internal affairs and structural problems. This corporate culture has served as a major lesson for the then-new anime studio's management. Specifically, Sunrise established a management policy that "creators should not be in management positions". As a result, while the company has maintained its own studios following the establishment, almost all actual production work, other than production progress management, has been outsourced to other Japanese animation studios.

While the studio's initial management team emphasized the quality of its anime productions, they also prioritized maintaining overall profitability and sound management through cost reductions, such as outsourcing as necessary, and various copyright revenues. Sunrise's system of integrating toy product planning as the starting point and core of its anime projects is another key characteristic that has shaped the company to this day. This stems from financial issues in the early days, such as Sunrise's inability to cover labor costs due to its small size and limited resources, and the inability to secure budget to own the adaptation rights to manga.

=== Split from Shoeisha and Tohokushinsha, Nippon Sunrise era ===
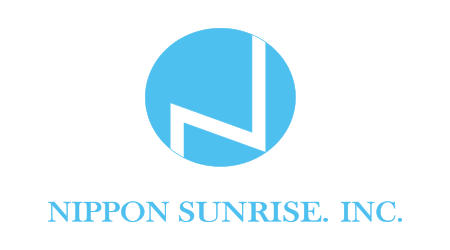
Nippon Sunrise logo, used from 1977 to 1987.

By November 1976, Shoeisha and Tohokushinsha decided to exit the animation production business by selling Sunrise Studio to its members through a management buyout, reorganizing themselves as an independent studio known as Nippon Sunrise Inc. (Note: Japanese: 株式会社日本サンライズ, Hepburn: Kabushiki-gaisha Nihōn Sanraizu) and started outsourcing animation production for several animated series produced by Toei and Tsuburaya Productions. According to one of Sunrise's members Masao Iizuka, all of its profits of Sunrise's productions like Reideen the Brave went to Sunrise's former parent Tohokushinsha.

In 1981, Nippon Sunrise's first president Yoshinori Kishimoto suddenly died due to poor health. Following Kishimoto's death, Masanori Ito became Nippon Sunrise's second president.

In 1985, Nippon Sunrise announced its entry into the Original video animation (OVA) operations. Although they were called OVAs, there were few completely original projects produced by the studio as they instead followed a basic policy of producing sequels to popular productions such as "Armored Trooper VOTOMS" or projects that were extensions like the OVA spin-off Armor "Hunter Mellowlink".

=== Sunrise era ===
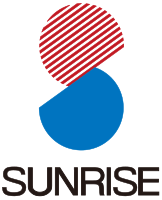
Logo used from 1987 to 1996.

In June 1987, the company changed its name by dropping the Nippon name from its branded and was renamed to simply "Sunrise" with the rebranded anime production studio appointing Eiji Yamaura as their new president. Following Nippon Sunrise's rebranding to Sunrise and the appointment of Yamaura as its new president, Sunrise started to shift away from its original focus on original projects and began to produce more animated programmes based on manga starting with the adaptations of Mister Ajikko and City Hunter.

=== Bandai ownership era ===
Logo used from 1996 to 2025, currently used as a secondary logo.

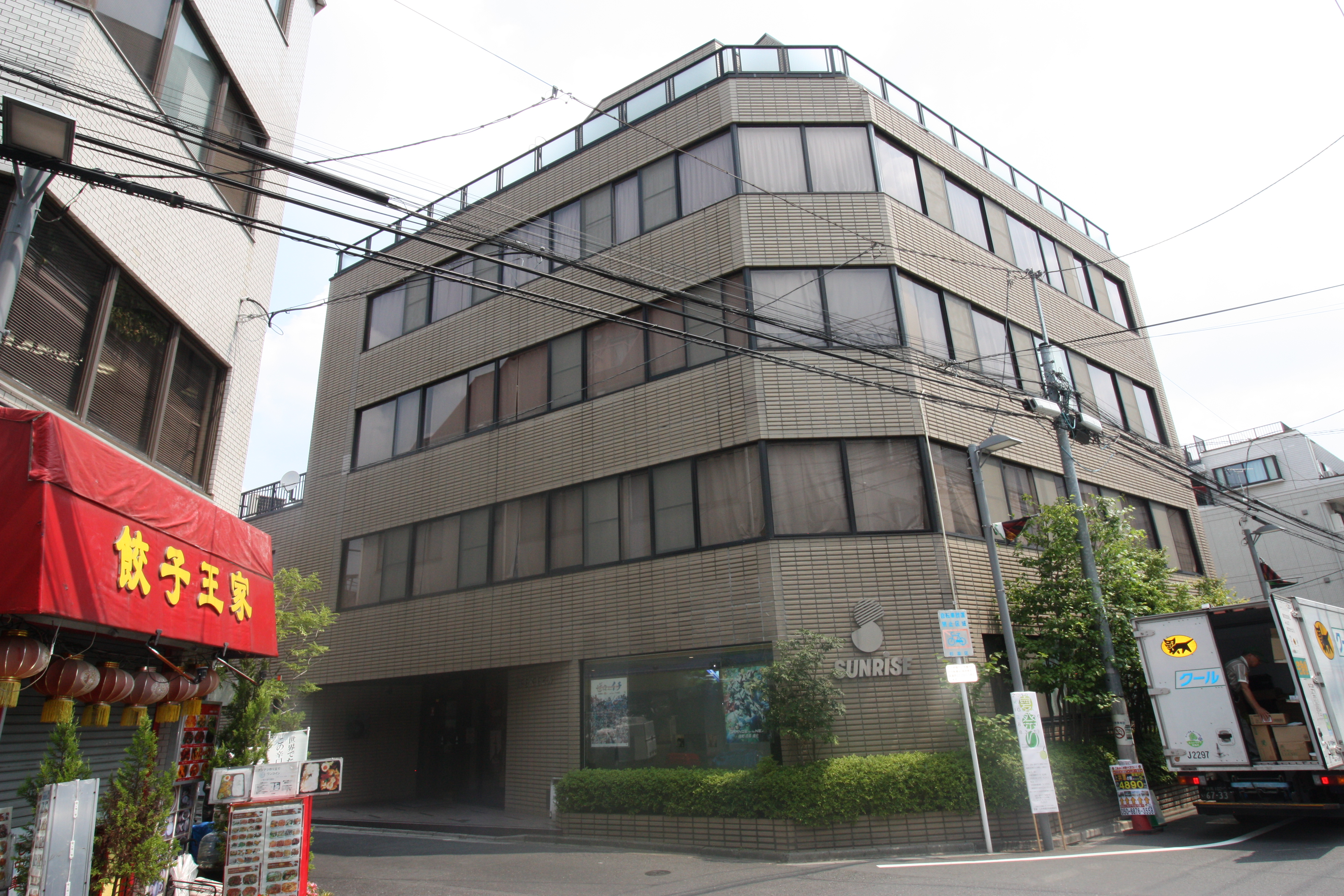
Former headquarters in Kami-Igusa, Suginami, Tokyo from 1996 to 2021.

In February 1994, multinational toy manufacturer & distributor Bandai had acquired Sunrise and effectively became part of the Bandai Group as toy manufacturer Bandai entered the film & television animation production business and gained an official animation studio with Bandai's management including Satoru Matsumoto joining the studio.

Later that year, Sunrise established its own CG production division called Digital Creation Studio (Sunrise D.I.D.), with the new division focusing on CG production. Since then, digital coloring and CG processing have been introduced to Sunrise's works. In the early stages of adoption, 3D-oriented expressions were used in Sunrise's prior shows through its eternal Studio 7 unit such as The King of Braves GaoGaiGar and DinoZone while digital coloring was used in some programs such as the Universal Century Extra video bonus for Mobile Suit Gundam: The 08th MS Team and Escaflowne. However it was not until 2003, nine years after the founding of Sunrise's CG production division, Sunrise started switching to full-scale digital ink-and-paint production for all of its future works, which was relatively late compared to other studios.

In October 1998, the Studio 2 team led by Masahiko Minami left Sunrise to establish a new studio Bones whom Sunrise would later co-produce Cowboy Bebop: The Movie with the new studio.

In June 2002, Sunrise launched their wholly-owned music publishing division, Sunrise Music Publishing that would manage all of Sunrise's music copyrights for music development.

=== Bandai Namco Holdings era, building consolidation and restructuring ===
In October 2005, Sunrise's parent company & toy manufacturer Bandai merged with multinational video game and entertainment company Namco to form Namco Bandai Holdings with Sunrise becoming Namco Bandai's animation production & entertainment company as they would expand its production activities with adaptations of several Bandai and Namco properties.

In February 2015, Sunrise's parent company Bandai Namco Holdings announced they were planning to spin-off some of Sunrise's production divisions including Sunrise's kids & family anime IP division and its interactive division alongside related program and character copyrights into a separate animation production company that would serve as a wholly-owned subsidiary of Sunrise called Bandai Namco Pictures which began its operations two months later in April of that year, as Sunrise will now specialize in the production of shows aimed at a high-quality audience and would focus on character licensing and IP businesses. The new Bandai Namco Pictures subsidiary was based in Nerima, Tokyo and will handle the intellectual property aimed at children and will plan to produce original IP with the company's representative director and president Yasuo Miyagawa overseeing the new production subsidiary under the same role.

At the start of March 2021, Sunrise entered the online website operations with the establishment of its own archival website dedicated to Sunrise's past productions (including works from Sunrise Beyond and excluding works that are now under Bandai Namco Pictures) called Sunrise World.

In October 2021, Sunrise announced that they were consolidating all of its units, including its in-house animation production studios alongside its subsidiaries Bandai Namco Pictures and Sunrise Beyond under one roof by moving its headquarters into a new office based in Ogikubo, Suginami, Tokyo that would bring all of Sunrise's production divisions & subsidiaries under one building. The new building, titled "White Base" named after the Pegasus battleship that appeared in Mobile Suit Gundam. Sunrise itself became the first that would move to the new headquarters during that month while Sunrise Beyond became the final studio to move into the new building by January of the following year with Sunrise Music, following suit five months later.

As part of Bandai Namco's major restructuring, it was announced on February 8, 2022, that Sunrise would merge with the home video unit of Bandai Namco Arts as well as the Bandai Namco Rights Marketing subsidiary to become Bandai Namco Filmworks. Sunrise would continue to exists as a label of the company for its animation studio, known officially as a brand with the changes taking effect by April 1 of that year.

== Studios ==
- Studio 1 was created when Sunrise was founded in 1972. Notable works include Mobile Suit Gundam, Space Runaway Ideon, Armored Trooper Votoms, Patlabor, and Inuyasha. It was also the studio responsible for various later Gundam installments: G, Wing, X, Turn A, Unicorn, Reconguista in G, Thunderbolt, Narrative, and Hathaway.
- Studio 2 was created around 1974–75, and some key members left to form Bones in 1998. Notable works include Aura Battler Dunbine and some installments of Gundam: including Zeta, ZZ, Victory, Char's Counterattack and F91. It also worked on The Vision of Escaflowne and Cowboy Bebop, co-producing a film adaptation of each with Bones.
- Studio 3 was created in 1975. Early works included Blue Comet SPT Layzner and City Hunter. It was responsible for many Gundam installments, including 0083, 08th MS Team, and TV series of the franchise: SEED Destiny, 00, AGE, Build Fighters, Build Fighters Try, Iron-Blooded Orphans and The Witch from Mercury.
- Studio 4 was created in 1979, and notable works include The Ultraman anime. The studio became inactive in 1987. The current Studio 4 began as support for Studio 2, and was known as Studio Iogi (井荻スタジオ) (named after the pseudonym of longtime Sunrise director Yoshiyuki Tomino). The studio's first major work was 1985's Dirty Pair, and other notable works include Planetes, s-CRY-ed and Code Geass.
- Studio 5 was also created in 1979. One of its producers was Mikihiro Iwata, a founder of A-1 Pictures. Notable works include Crest of the Stars, the InuYasha movies, Daily Lives of High School Boys, Aikatsu!, Good Luck Girl!, Gin Tama, Mobile Suit SD Gundam and Mobile Suit Gundam 0080: War in the Pocket.
- Studio 6 was created in 1983. Notable works include The Big O, Sgt. Frog, and Tiger & Bunny. they also provided animation to Batman: The Animated Series. Some members left to form Bridge in 2007.
- Studio 7 was created in 1985. Its first work, uncredited, was on the American cartoon series Centurions: Power Xtreme, and it is noted for Sacred Seven, s-CRY-ed and the Brave series. Some members left to form Manglobe in 2002.
- Established around 1995, Studio 8 is notable for My-HiME, Buddy Complex, Idolmaster: Xenoglossia, The Girl Who Leapt Through Space, Horizon in the Middle of Nowhere, Accel World and Love Live!.
- Studio 7's sister studio, Studio 9 was established in 1996. Notable works include Gasaraki, Infinite Ryvius, Mobile Suit Gundam SEED, Argento Soma and Battle Spirits.
- Studio 5's sister studio, Studio 10 was established around 1996. Notable works include Outlaw Star, Dinosaur King and Phi Brain: Puzzle of God.
- Studio 8's sister studio, Studio 11 was established in 2009 and worked on Kurokami and the SD Gundam Sangokuden Brave Battle Warriors series.
- Sunrise's CG production studio, D.I.D. helps creating CG for many of the company's shows (notably Tiger & Bunny, Zegapain, Cross Ange, Valvrave the Liberator, Gundam MS Igloo and Gundam The Origin). They also produce CG work for other animation studios, including Xebec's Space Battleship Yamato 2199.
- Formerly known as Ogikubo Studio (荻窪スタジオ) or Sunrise Emotion, Nerima Studio is best known for the Freedom Project, Valvrave the Liberator, the King of Thorn anime film and Cross Ange.
- Sunrise Origin Studio (サンライズオリジンスタジオ) is Sunrise's in-between animation studio that does in-between animation for other studios' anime titles such as My Hero Academia to The Boy and the Beast.
- White Base is a new studio that recently opened in November 2021 and is named after the famous battleship from the original Gundam.

== Works ==
=== TV animation ===
==== 1970s ====
No.	Title	Directors	Year(s)	Broadcast network(s)	Studios	Notes
1	Hazedon	Osamu Dezaki	October 1972–March 1973	Fuji TV	Studio 1	First work as Soeisha (studio name from 1972 to 1976).
2	Zero Tester	Ryōsuke Takahashi	October 1973–December 1974	Fuji TV	Studio 1	The studio's first mecha production before iconic Mobile Suit Gundam, for which it would become famous.
3	Brave Raideen	Yoshiyuki Tomino (#01–25); Tadao Nagahama (#26–50)	April 1975–March 1976	TV Asahi	Studio 1	In association with Tohokushinsha and Asahi Advertising.
4	La Seine no Hoshi	Masaaki Ōsumi (#1–26); Yoshiyuki Tomino (#27–39)	April 1975–December 1975	Fuji TV	Studio 2	In association with Unimax and MK Company.
5	Kum-Kum	Rintaro	October 1975–March 1976	TBS	Studio 1	In association with ITC Japan.
6	Chōdenji Robo Combattler V	Tadao Nagahama	April 1976–May 1977	TV Asahi	Studio 1	In association with Toei Doga.
7	Dinosaur Expedition Born Free	Koichi Takano	October 1976–March 1977	TV Asahi	Studio 1	In association with Tsuburaya Productions. First work as Nippon Sunrise (studio name from 1976 to 1987).
8	Robot Child Beeton	Masaaki Osumi	October 1976–September 1977	TBS	Studio 3	
9	Chōdenji Machine Voltes V	Tadao Nagahama	June 1977–March 1978	TV Asahi	Studio 2	In association with Toei Doga and Tohokushinsha.
10	Invincible Super Man Zambot 3	Yoshiyuki Tomino	October 1977–March 1978	TV Asahi	Studio 3	
11	Majokko Tickle	Takashi Hisaoka	March 1978–January 1979	TV Asahi	Studio 2	In association with Toei Doga, Neomedia and Kaze Productions.
12	Tōshō Daimos	Tadao Nagahama	April 1978–January 1979	TV Asahi	Studio 2	In association with Toei Doga and Tohokushinsha.
13	Invincible Steel Man Daitarn 3	Yoshiyuki Tomino	June 1978–March 1979	TV Asahi	Studio 1	
14	Cyborg 009	Ryōsuke Takahashi	March 1979–March 1980	TV Asahi	Studio 3	In association with Toei Doga.
15	Future Robot Daltanious	Katsutoshi Sasaki	March 1979-March 1980	TV Tokyo	Studio 2	In association with Toei Doga.
16	The Ultraman	Hisayuki Toriumi; Takeyuki Kanda	April 1979–March 1980	TBS	Studio 4	In association with Tsuburaya Productions.
17	Mobile Suit Gundam	Yoshiyuki Tomino	April 1979–January 1980	TV Asahi	Studio 1	
18	Scientific Adventure Team Tansar 5	Takao Yotsuji	July 1979–March 1980	TV Tokyo	Studio 5	In association with Tokyu Agency.

==== 1980s ====
No.	Title	Year(s)	Broadcast network(s)	Studios	Notes
19	Invincible Robo Trider G7	February 1980–January 1981	TV Asahi	Studio 2	
20	Space Runaway Ideon	May 1980–January 1981	TV Tokyo	Studio 1	
21	Strongest Robo Daiohja	January 1981–January 1982	TV Asahi	Studio 2	
22	Fang of the Sun Dougram	October 1981–March 1983	TV Tokyo	Studio 1	
23	Combat Mecha Xabungle	February 1982–January 1983	TV Asahi	Studio 2	
24	Aura Battler Dunbine	February 1983–January 1984	TV Asahi	Studio 2	
25	Armored Trooper Votoms	April 1983–March 1984	TV Tokyo	Studio 1	
26	Round Vernian Vifam	October 1983–September 1984	TBS	Studio 3	
27	Heavy Metal L-Gaim	February 1984–February 1985	TV Asahi	Studio 2	
28	Giant Gorg	April 1984–September 1984	TV Tokyo	Studio 4	
29	Panzer World Galient	October 1984–March 1985	Nippon TV	Studio 1	
30	Choriki Robo Galatt	October 1984–April 1985	TV Asahi	Studio 3	
31	Mobile Suit Zeta Gundam	March 1985–February 1986	TV Asahi	Studio 2	
32	Dirty Pair	July 1985–April 1988	Nippon TV	Studio 4	
33	Blue Comet SPT Layzner	October 1985–June 1986	Nippon TV	Studio 3	
34	Mobile Suit Gundam ZZ	March 1986–January 1987	TV Asahi	Studio 2	
35	Metal Armor Dragonar	February 1987–January 1988	TV Asahi	Studio 7	
36	City Hunter	April 1987–March 1988	Nippon TV	Studio 3	
37	Mister Ajikko	October 1987–September 1989	TV Tokyo	Studio 7	First work as Sunrise (studio name from 1987 to 2022).
38	Mashin Hero Wataru	April 1988–March 1989	Nippon TV	Studio 7	
39	Ronin Warriors	April 1988–March 1989	TV Asahi	Studio 2	
40	City Hunter 2	April 1988–July 1989	Nippon TV	Studio 3	
41	Jushin Liger	March 1989–January 1990	TV Asahi	Studio 2	
42	Madō King Granzort	April 1989–March 1990	Nippon TV	Studio 7	
43	Mobile Police Patlabor	October 1989–September 1990	Nippon TV	Studio 1	In association with Bandai and Tohokushinsha.
44	City Hunter 3	October 1989–January 1990	Nippon TV	Studio 3	

==== 1990s ====
No.	Title	Director(s)	Year(s)	Broadcast network(s)	Studios	Notes
45	Brave Exkaiser	Katsuyoshi Yatabe	February 1990–January 1991	TV Asahi	Studio 7	
46	Mashin Hero Wataru 2	Shuji Iuchi	March 3, 1990 – March 8, 1991	Nippon TV	Studio 7	
47	The Brave of Sun Fighbird	Katsuyoshi Yatabe	February 2, 1991 – February 1, 1992	TV Asahi	Studio 7	Also known as The Brave Fighter of Sun Fighbird co-production with Takara and Tokyu Agency
48	Future GPX Cyber Formula	Mitsuo Fukuda	March 15, 1991 – December 20, 1991	Nippon TV	Studio 7	co-production with Asatsu-DK and VAP
49	Matchless Raijin-Oh	Toshifumi Kawase	April 3, 1991 – March 25, 1992	TV Tokyo	Studio 5	
50	Armored Police Metal Jack	Hiroshi Matsuzono (first half); Kiyoshi Egami (second half)	April 8, 1991 – December 23, 1991	TV Tokyo	Studio 7	In association with Studio Deen.
51	City Hunter '91		April 1991–October 1991	Nippon TV	Studio 3	
52	Mama is a 4th Grader		January 1992–December 1992	Nippon TV	Studio 2	
53	The Brave Fighter of Legend Da-Garn		February 1992–January 1993	TV Asahi	Studio 7	
54	Genki Bakuhatsu Ganbaruger		April 1992–February 1993	TV Tokyo	Studio 5	
55	The Brave Express Might Gaine		January 1993–January 1994	TV Asahi	Studio 7	
56	Nekketsu Saikyō Go-Saurer		March 1993–February 1994	TV Tokyo	Studio 5	
57	Mobile Suit Victory Gundam		April 1993–March 1994	TV Asahi	Studio 2	
59	Iron Leaguer		April 1993–March 1994	TV Tokyo	Studio 3	
59	Brave Police J-Decker		February 1994–January 1995	TV Asahi	Studio 7	
60	Haō Taikei Ryū Knight		April 1994–March 1995	TV Tokyo	Studio 1	
61	Mobile Fighter G Gundam		April 1994–March 1995	TV Asahi	Studio 1	
62	The Brave of Gold Goldran		February 1995–January 1996	TV Asahi	Studio 7	
63	Historical Drama In a Moonless Night		February 19, 1995 – February 26, 1995	Nippon TV	New Business Department	
64	Wild Knights Gulkeeva		April 1995–September 1995	TV Tokyo	Studio 3	
65	Mobile Suit Gundam Wing		April 1995–March 1996	TV Asahi	Studio 1	
66	Mobile Suit Gundam: The 08th MS Team		January 1996–July 1999	TV Asahi	Studio 1	
67	Brave Command Dagwon		February 1996–January 1997	TV Asahi	Studio 7	
68	The Vision of Escaflowne		April 1996–September 1996	TV Tokyo	Studio 3	
69	After War Gundam X		April 1996–December 1996	TV Asahi	Studio 1	
70	Ganbarist! Shun		July 1996–March 1997	Nippon TV	Studio 5	
71	Raideen the Superior		October 1996–June 1997	TV Tokyo	Studio 8	
72	The King of Braves GaoGaiGar		February 1997–January 1998	TV Asahi	Studio 7	
73	Super Mashin Hero Wataru		October 1997–September 1998	TV Tokyo	Studio 6	
74	Outlaw Star		January 1998–June 1998	TV Tokyo	Studio 10	
75	Round Vernian Vifam 13		March 1998–October 1998	TBS	Vifam Studio	
76	Brain Powerd		April 1998–November 1998	WOWOW	Studio 1	
77	Sentimental Journey		April 1998–July 1998	TV Tokyo	Studio 6	
78	DT Eightron		April 1998–November 1998	Fuji TV	Studio 5	
79	Gasaraki		October 1998–March 1999	TV Tokyo	Studio 9	
80	Cowboy Bebop		October 1998–April 1999	WOWOW	Studio 2	
81	Crest of the Stars		January 1999–March 1999	WOWOW	Studio 5	
82	Betterman		April 1999–September 1999	TV Tokyo	Studio 7	
83	Aesop World		April 1999–December 1999	TV Tokyo	Aesop Studio	
84	Angel Links		April 1999–June 1999	WOWOW	Studio 10	
85	Turn A Gundam		April 1999–April 2000	Fuji TV	Studio 1	
86	Infinite Ryvius		October 1999–March 2000	TV Tokyo	Studio 9	
87	Seraphim Call		October 1999–December 1999	TV Tokyo	Studio 8	
88	The Big O	Kazuyoshi Katayama	October 13, 1999 – January 19, 2000	WOWOW	Studio 6	

==== 2000s ====
No.	Title	Director(s)	Year(s)	Broadcast network(s)	Studios	Notes
89	Mighty Cat Masked Niyandar	Tsutomu Shibayama	February 2000–September 2001	TV Asahi	Studio 8	
90	Banner of the Stars	Yasuchika Nagaoka	April 2000–July 2000	WOWOW	Studio 5	
91	Brigadoon: Marin & Melan	Yoshitomo Yonetani	July 2000–February 2001	WOWOW	Studio 7	
92	Dinozaurs: The Series	Kiyoshi Fukumoto	July 2000–November 2000	Fuji TV; Fox Kids (United States)	Studio 10	co-production with OLM Digital and Saban Entertainment
93	Gear Fighter Dendoh	Mitsuo Fukuda	October 2000–June 2001	TV Tokyo	Studio 10	co-production with Yomiko Advertising
94	Argento Soma	Kazuyoshi Katayama	October 2000–March 2001	TV Tokyo	Studio 9	
95	Inuyasha	Masashi Ikeda (1–44); Yasunao Aoki (45–167)	October 2000–September 2004	Nippon TV	Studio 1	Adaptation of the manga series by Rumiko Takahashi
96	Z.O.E. Dolores, I	Tetsuya Watanabe	April 2001–September 2001	TV Tokyo	Studio 6	co-production with Konami Computer Entertainment Japan; Based on the video game series "Zone of the Enders" by Konami
97	s-CRY-ed	Gorō Taniguchi	July 2001–December 2001	TV Tokyo	Studio 4	
98	Banner of the Stars II	Yasuchika Nagaoka	July 2001–September 2001	WOWOW	Studio 5	
99	Crush Gear Turbo	Shūji Iuchi	October 2001–January 2003	TV Asahi	Studio 10	
100	Witch Hunter Robin	Shūkō Murase	July 2002–December 2002	TV Tokyo	Studio 7	
101	Overman King Gainer		September 2002–March 2003	WOWOW	Studio 4	
102	Mobile Suit Gundam SEED		October 2002–September 2003	TBS	Studio 9	Ninth installment in the Gundam franchise
103	The Big O II		January 2003–March 2003	WOWOW	Studio 6	
104	Machine Robo Rescue		January 2003–January 2004	TV Tokyo	Sunrise D.I.D	
105	Crush Gear Nitro		February 2003–January 2004	TV Asahi	Studio 10	
106	Tank Knights Fortress		April 2003–March 2004	TV Tokyo	Studio 8	
107	Planetes		October 2003–April 2004	NHK	Studio 4	
108	Superior Defender Gundam Force		January 2004–December 2004	TV Tokyo	Sunrise D.I.D	
109	Sgt. Frog		April 2004–April 2011	TV Tokyo	Studio 6	
110	Onmyō Taisenki		September 2004–September 2005	TV Tokyo	Studio 10	
111	My-HiME		September 2004–March 2005	TV Tokyo	Studio 8	
112	Mobile Suit Gundam SEED Destiny	Mitsuo Fukuda	October 2004–October 2005	TBS	Studio 3	Tenth installment to the Gundam franchise
113	Yakitate!! Japan		October 2004–March 2006	TV Tokyo	Studio 1	
114	Majime ni Fumajime Kaiketsu Zorori		February 2005–January 2007	TV Asahi	Studio 5	In association with Ajia-do Animation Works.
115	GaoGaiGar Final -Grand Glorious Gathering-	Yoshitomo Yonetani	April 2005–June 2005	TV Tokyo	Studio 7	
116	Cluster Edge	Masashi Ikeda (#1–13); Hitoyuki Matsui (#14–25)	October 2005–March 2006	TV Tokyo	Studio 1	
117	My-Otome	Masakazu Obara	October 2005–March 2006	TV Tokyo	Studio 8	
118	Zegapain	Masami Shimoda	April 2006–September 2006	TV Tokyo	Studio 9	
119	Gintama	Shinji Takamatsu (1–105); Yōichi Fujita (100–201)	April 2006–March 2010	TV Tokyo	Studio 5	
120	Intrigue in the Bakumatsu – Irohanihoheto	Ryōsuke Takahashi (Note: Credited as Supervising Director (総監督).); Yoshimitsu Ōashi (Note: Credited as Chief Director (チーフディレクター).)	October 2006–April 2007	Animax	Studio 7	
121	Code Geass: Lelouch of the Rebellion	Gorō Taniguchi	October 2006–July 2007	TBS	Studio 4	
122	Kekkaishi	Kenji Kodama	October 2006–February 2008	Nippon TV	Studio 1	Adaptation of the manga series by Yellow Tanabe
123	Dinosaur King	Katsuyoshi Yatabe	February 4, 2007 – August 31, 2008	TV Asahi	Studio 10	co-production with Sega and ADK; Based on the video game by Sega
124	Idolmaster: Xenoglossia	Tatsuyuki Nagai	April 2, 2007 – September 22, 2007	AT-X	Studio 8	Based on the video game franchise The Idolmaster by Bandai Namco Entertainment
125	Mobile Suit Gundam 00		October 2007–March 2008	TBS	Studio 3	
126	Code Geass: Lelouch of the Rebellion R2		April 2008–September 2008	TBS	Studio 4	
127	Battle Spirits: Shounen Toppa Bashin		September 2008–September 2009	TV Asahi	Studio 9	
128	Tales of the Abyss		October 2008–March 2009	Tokyo MX	Studio 1	
129	Mobile Suit Gundam 00 Second Season	Seiji Mizushima	October 2008–March 2009	TBS	Studio 3	Eleventh installment in the Gundam franchise
130	The Girl Who Leapt Through Space	Masakazu Obara	January 2009–June 2009	TV Tokyo	Studio 8	
131	Black God	Tsuneo Kobayashi	January 2009–June 2009	TV Asahi	Studio 11	Based on the Japanese/South Korean manga by Lim Dall-young; published by Square Enix
132	Battle Spirits: Dan the Red Warrior		September 2009–September 2010	TV Asahi	Studio 9	
133	Inuyasha: The Final Act	Yasunao Aoki	October 4, 2009 – March 30, 2010	Nippon TV	Studio 1	Direct sequel to Inuyasha; Adaptation of the final 12 volumes of the manga series Inuyasha by Rumiko Takahashi

==== 2010s ====
No.	Title	Director(s)	Year(s)	Broadcast network(s)	Studios	Notes
134	SD Gundam Sangokuden Brave Battle Warriors	Kenichi Suzuki; Kunihiro Mori	April 3, 2010 – March 26, 2011	TV Tokyo	Nerima Studio	Adaptation of the SD Gundam model kit series BB Senshi Sangokuden
135	Battle Spirits Brave	Akira Nishimori	September 12, 2010 – September 11, 2011	TV Asahi	Studio 9	
136	Tiger & Bunny	Keiichi Sato; Kunihiro Mori (Chief, #14-25)	April 3, 2011 – September 18, 2011	BS11	Studio 6	
137	Gintama	Yōichi Fujita	April 4, 2011 – March 28, 2013	TV Tokyo	Studio 5	Known as Gintama: Enchōsen for season 2 Based on the Weekly Shōnen Jump manga series of the same name by Hideaki Sorachi and published by Shueisha
138	Sacred Seven	Yoshimitsu Ōhashi	July 3, 2011 – September 18, 2011	MBS	Studio 7	
139	Battle Spirits: Heroes	Akira Nishimori (ep 1-15); Masaki Watanabe (ep 16-50)	September 18, 2011 – September 2, 2012	TV Asahi	Studio 9	Fourth installment in the Battle Spirits franchise
140	Horizon in the Middle of Nowhere	Manabu Ono	October 1, 2011 – September 29, 2012	MBS	Studio 8	Adaptation of the light novel series by Minoru Kawakami
141	Mobile Suit Gundam AGE	Susumu Yamaguchi	October 9, 2011 – September 23, 2012	TBS	Studio 3	In association with Level-5; Twelfth installment in the Gundam franchise.
142	Phi Brain: Puzzle of God	Junichi Sato (season 1); Hirotaka Endo (seasons 2–3)	October 2, 2011 – March 23, 2014	NHK	Studio 10	
143	Daily Lives of High School Boys	Shinji Takamatsu; Ai Yoshimura (assistant)	January 9, 2012–March 26, 2012	TV Tokyo	Studio 9	Adaptation of the manga series of the same name by Yasunobu Yamauchi; published by Square Enix
144	Natsuiro Kiseki	Seiji Mizushima	April 6, 2012 – June 29, 2012	MBS	Studio 11	
145	Accel World	Masakazu Obara	April 7, 2012 – September 22, 2012	Tokyo MX	Studio 8	Adaptation of the light novel series of the same name by Reki Kawahara; In association with GENCO
146	Good Luck Girl!	Tomoyuki Kawamura; Yoichi Fujita	July 5, 2012 – September 27, 2012	TV Tokyo	Studio 9	Adpatation of the Jump Square manga series of the same name by Yoshiaki Sukeno.
147	Battle Spirits: Sword Eyes	Masaki Watanabe	September 2012–September 2013	TV Asahi	Studio 9	Fifth installment in the Battle Spirits franchise.
148	Aikatsu!		October 2012–March 2016	TV Tokyo	Studio 9 & Studio 5	Later animation provided by Bandai Namco Pictures.
149	Love Live! School Idol Project	January 6, 2013 – June 29, 2014	Takahiko Kyōgoku	Tokyo MX	Studio 8	First series in the Love Live! franchise.
150	Valvrave the Liberator	Kō Matsuo	April 12, 2013 – December 26, 2013	MBS/TBS	Nerima Studio	
151	Battle Spirits: Saikyou Ginga Ultimate Zero	Masaki Watanabe	September 22, 2013 – September 21, 2014	TV Asahi	Studio 9	Sixth and final installment in the Battle Spirits franchise to be produced by Sunrise. Future installments in the franchise will be produced by Bandai Namco Pictures.
152	Gundam Build Fighters		October 2013–March 2014	TV Tokyo	Studio 3	
153	Buddy Complex		January 2014–March 2014	Tokyo MX	Studio 8	
154	KERORO		March 2014–September 2014	Animax	Studio 6	
155	Mobile Suit Gundam-san		July 2014–September 2014	Tokyo MX	Studio 6	
156	Tribe Cool Crew		September 2014–October 2015	TV Asahi		In association with Ajia-do Animation Works.
157	Gundam Reconguista in G	Yoshiyuki Tomino	October 2, 2014 – March 26, 2015	MBS/TBS	Studio 1	Thirteenth installment in the Gundam franchise
158	Cross Ange: Rondo of Angels and Dragons	Yoshiharu Ashino	October 5, 2014 – March 29, 2015	Tokyo MX	Nerima Studio	co-production with PROJECT ANGE
159	Gundam Build Fighters Try	Shinya Watada	October 8, 2014 – April 1, 2015	TV Tokyo	Studio 3	Part of the Gundam franchise
160	Mobile Suit Gundam: Iron-Blooded Orphans	Tatsuyuki Nagai	October 4, 2015 – March 2, 2017	MBS	Studio 3	Fourteenth installment in the Gundam franchise.
161	Mobile Suit Gundam Unicorn RE:0096	Kazuhiro Furuhashi	April 2016–September 2016	TV Asahi		Re-edited version of the OVA Mobile Suit Gundam Unicorn by Kazuhiro Furuhashi; Part of the Gundam franchise Based on the novel and manga by Harutoshi Fukui
162	Love Live! Sunshine!!	Kazuo Sakai	July 2, 2016 – December 30, 2017	Tokyo MX	Studio 8	
163	Magic-kyun! Renaissance	Mitsue Yamazaki	October 2016-January 2017	Tokyo MX	Studio 8	
164	ClassicaLoid	Yoichi Fujita	October 2016–April 2017	NHK	Studio 5	
165	Gundam Build Divers	Shinya Watada	April 3, 2018 – September 25, 2018	TV Tokyo		A successor to Gundam: Build Fighters; Part of the Gundam franchise
166	Double Decker! Doug & Kirill	Jōji Furuta; Ryō Andō (Note: Series Unit Director (シリーズ演出))	September 30, 2018 – December 23, 2018	Tokyo MX		
167	Mobile Suit Gundam: The Origin - Advent of the Red Comet	Yoshikazu Yasuhiko; Takashi Imanishi	April 2019–August 2019	NHK General TV		A television recompilation of the OVA series Part of the Gundam franchise Based on the manga Mobile Suit Gundam: The Origin by Yoshikazu Yasuhiko; published by Kadokawa Shoten
168	SD Gundam World Sangoku Soketsuden	Takahiro Ikezoe; Touko Machida	July 26, 2019 – March 25, 2021	Tokyo MX		Part of the Gundam franchise

==== 2020s ====
No.	Title	Director(s)	Year(s)	Broadcast network(s)	Studios	Notes
169	Wave, Listen to Me!	Tatsuma Minamikawa	April 4, 2020 – June 20, 2020	MBS		
170	Yashahime: Princess Half-Demon	Teruo Sato (S1); Masakazu Hishida (S2)	October 3, 2020 – March 26, 2022	NNS		
171	Love Live! Nijigasaki High School Idol Club	Tomoyuki Kawamura	October 2020–June 2022	Tokyo MX		Third installment in the Love Live! franchise.
172	Scarlet Nexus	Hiroyuki Nishimura	July 2021–December 2021	Tokyo MX		Based on the video game of the same name by Bandai Namco Studios
173	Love Live! Superstar!!	Takahiko Kyogoku	July 11, 2021–December 22, 2024	NHK Educational TV		Fourth installment in the Love Live! franchise.
174	Mobile Suit Gundam: The Witch from Mercury	Hiroshi Kobayashi; Ryō Andō	October 2, 2022 – July 2, 2023	MBS/TBS	Studio 1, Studio 3	Fifteenth installment in the Gundam franchise.
175	Yohane the Parhelion: Sunshine in the Mirror	Asami Nakatani	July 2, 2023 – September 24, 2023	Tokyo MX		
176	Code Geass: Rozé of the Recapture	Yoshimitsu Ōhashi	June 21, 2024 – September 6, 2024	Disney+	Nerima Studio	A television re-edited adaptation of the film series of the same name.
177	Mobile Suit Gundam GQuuuuuuX	Kazuya Tsurumaki	April 9, 2025–June 25, 2025	NNS		Sixteenth installment in the Gundam franchise In association with Studio Khara.
178	Maebashi Witches	Junichi Yamamoto	April 6, 2025 – June 22, 2025	Tokyo MX		
179	My Status as an Assassin Obviously Exceeds the Hero's	Nobuyoshi Habara	October 7, 2025 – December 22, 2025	TV Tokyo		
180	Yoroi-Shinden Samurai Troopers	Yōichi Fujita	January 6, 2026	Tokyo MX		
181	Mao	Teruo Sato	April 4, 2026	NHK General TV		
182	Kindergarten Wars	Shinsuke Gomi	Q2 2027	TBA		Co-production with Felix Film

=== Films ===
Title	Year(s)	Distributor	Studios	Notes
Mobile Suit Gundam I	March 14, 1981	Shochiku	Iogi Studio	Also known as Mobile Suit Gundam: The Movie; First feature film in the Gundam franchise; Re-edited theatrical versions of the first 13 episodes.
Mobile Suit Gundam II: Soldiers of Sorrow	July 11, 1981	Shochiku	Iogi Studio	Second feature film in the Gundam franchise.
Mobile Suit Gundam III: Encounters in Space	March 13, 1982	Shochiku	Studio 3	Third feature film in the Gundam franchise.
The Ideon: A Contact	July 1982	Shochiku	Studio 3	co-production with Sanrio
The Ideon: Be invoked	July 1982	Shochiku	Studio 3	co-production with Sanrio
Crusher Joe	March 12, 1983	Shochiku Fuji	Studio 4	
Dougram: Documentary of the Fang of the Sun	July 9, 1983	Shochiku	Studio 1	
Choro-Q Dougram	July 9, 1983	Shochiku	Studio 1	
Xabungle Graffiti	July 9, 1983	Shochiku	Studio 2	
Arion	March 15, 1986	Toho	Studio 1	
Dirty Pair: Project Eden	November 28, 1986	Shochiku	Studio 1	
Bats & Terry	March 14, 1987	Shochiku	Studio 3	
Mobile Suit Gundam: Char's Counterattack	March 12, 1988	Shochiku	Studio 2	Fourth feature film in the Gundam franchise.
The Five Star Stories	March 11, 1989	Toho	Studio 2	
City Hunter: 357 Magnum	June 17, 1989	Studio 3		
Mobile Suit SD Gundam's Counterattack	July 15, 1989	Studio 5		
Gunhed	July 22, 1989			
Mobile Suit Gundam F91	March 16, 1991	Studio 2		
Mobile Suit Gundam 0083: The Last Blitz of Zeon	August 29, 1992	Studio 3		
Mobile Suit SD Gundam Festival	March 13, 1993	Studio 3 & Studio 1		
Gundam Wing: Endless Waltz -Special Edition-	August 1, 1998	Studio 1		
Mobile Suit Gundam: The 08th MS Team: Miller's Report	August 1, 1998	Studio 3		
Firefighter! Daigo of Fire Company M	July 27, 1999	Studio 5		
Escaflowne: A Girl in Gaea	June 24, 2000		Animation Production: Bones	
Pokémon 3: The Movie	July 8, 2000	Toho	CG assistance, Animation Production by: OLM, Inc.	
Cowboy Bebop: The Movie	September 1, 2001		Animation Production: Bones	
Inuyasha the Movie: Affections Touching Across Time	December 15, 2001	Studio 5		
Turn A Gundam: Earth Light	February 9, 2002	Studio 1		
Turn A Gundam: Moonlight Butterfly	February 10, 2002	Studio 1		
Crush Gear: Kaizaban's Challenge	July 20, 2002	Studio 10		
Inuyasha the Movie: The Castle Beyond the Looking Glass	December 21, 2002	Studio 5		
Inuyasha the Movie: Swords of an Honorable Ruler	December 20, 2003	Studio 5		
Steamboy	July 17, 2004	Nerima Studio		
Inuyasha the Movie: Fire on the Mystic Island	December 23, 2004	Studio 5		
Keroro Gunsō the Super Movie	March 11, 2006	Studio 6		
Kaiketsu Zorori: The Battle for the Mysterious Treasure	March 11, 2006	Studio 5	In association with Ajia-do Animation Works	
Keroro Gunsō the Super Movie 2: The Deep Sea Princess	March 17, 2007	Studio 6		
Chibi Kero: Secret of the Kero Ball!?	March 2007	Studio 6		
Keroro Gunso the Super Movie 3: Keroro vs. Keroro Great Sky Duel	March 2008	Studio 6		
Musha Kero: Debut! Sengoku Planet Ran Big Battle!!	March 2008	Studio 6		
Pailsen Files the Movie	January 2009	Sunrise D.I.D		
Keroro Gunso the Super Movie 4: Gekishin Dragon Warriors	March 2009	Studio 6		
Kero 0: Depart! Assembly of Everyone!!	March 2009	Studio 6		
Keroro Gunso the Super Movie: Creation! Ultimate Keroro, Wonder Space-Time Island	February 2010	Studio 6		
Chō Denei-ban SD Gundam Sangokuden Brave Battle Warriors	February 2010	Nerima Studio		
Gintama: The Movie	April 2010	Studio 5		
King of Thorn	May 2010	Nerima Studio		
Colorful	August 2010		Animation production by Ascension	
Mobile Suit Gundam 00 the Movie: A Wakening of the Trailblazer	September 2010	Studio 3		
s-CRY-ed: Alteration TAO	November 2011	Studio 4		
Sacred Seven: Wings of Gingetsu	January 2012	Studio 7		
s-CRY-ed: Alteration QUAN	March 2012	Studio 4		
Tiger & Bunny: The Beginning	September 2012	Shochiku	Studio 6	
Nerawareta Gakuen	November 2012	Studio 8		
Zorori's Big Big Big Big Adventure!	December 2012	Studio 5	In association with Ajia-do Animation Works	
Gintama: The Movie: The Final Chapter: Be Forever Yorozuya	July 2013	Studio 5		
Short Peace: Possessions	July 20, 2013	Shochiku	Nerima Studio	Received an Academy Award nomination for Best Animated Short Film for its segment Possessions (九十九)
Short Peace: Combustible	July 20, 2013	Shochiku	Nerima Studio	Received an Academy Award nomination for Best Animated Short Film for its segment Possessions (九十九)
Short Peace: Gambo	July 20, 2013	Shochiku	Nerima Studio	Received an Academy Award nomination for Best Animated Short Film for its segment Possessions (九十九)
Short Peace: A Farewell to Weapons	July 20, 2013	Shochiku	Nerima Studio	Received an Academy Award nomination for Best Animated Short Film for its segment Possessions (九十九)
Kaiketsu Zorori: Will Protect It! The Dinosaur Egg	December 2013	Studio 5	Final Kaiketsu Zorori film to be produced by Sunrise; future films would be produced by Bandai Namco Pictures; In association with Ajia-do Animation Works	
Tiger & Bunny: The Rising	February 8, 2014	Shochiku	Studio 6	Feature film sequel to the anime series.
Aikatsu! The Movie	December 2014	Studio 5		
Love Live! The School Idol Movie	June 15, 2015	Shochiku	Studio 8	co-production with Bandai Visual, Lantis, Bushiroad, Shochiku and ASCII Media Works; First film in the Love Live! franchise.
Accel World: Infinite Burst	July 23, 2016	Warner Bros. Pictures Japan	Studio 8	In association with GENCO
Zegapain ADP	October 2016	Studio 9		
Mobile Suit Gundam Narrative	November 2018	Shochiku	Studio 1	
Love Live! Sunshine!! The School Idol Movie: Over the Rainbow	January 4, 2019	Shochiku	Studio 8	Second film in the Love Live! franchise
City Hunter: Shinjuku Private Eyes	February 8, 2019	Aniplex	Studio 1	Second film in the City Hunter franchise since
Code Geass: Lelouch of the Re;surrection	February 2019			
Gundam Reconguista in G	November 2019–August 2022		Series of five films.	
Mobile Suit Gundam: Hathaway's Flash	June 2021–			
Mobile Suit Gundam: Cucuruz Doan's Island	June 2022	Shochiku		A theatrical remake of the fifteenth episode of the 1979 anime series Mobile Suit Gundam entitled "Cucuruz Doan's Island" by Hajime Yatate and Yoshiyuki Tomino; Part of the Gundam franchise
Sand Land	August 2023	Toho		In association with Kamikaze Douga and Anima; Based on the Weekly Shōnen Jump manga series by Akira Toriyama; published by Shueisha
City Hunter: Angel Dust	September 2023	Aniplex		co-production with The Answer Studio
Mobile Suit Gundam SEED Freedom	January 2024	Shochiku		A feature-length sequel to the anime series Mobile Suit Gundam SEED and Mobile Suit Gundam SEED Destiny.
Code Geass: Rozé of the Recapture	May 10, 2024 – August 2, 2024	Showgate		Series of four films.
Orbital Era	TBA			

=== OVAs/ONAs ===
Title	Directors	Year(s)	Studios	Notes
Round Vernian Vifam: Message from Kaute	Takeyuki Kanda	October 28, 1984	Studio 3	
Round Vernian Vifam: Gathered 13	Takeyuki Kanda	December 21, 1984	Studio 3	
Round Vernian Vifam: Missing 12	Takeyuki Kanda	February 25, 1985	Studio 3	
Armored Trooper VOTOMS: The Last Red Shoulder	Ryōsuke Takahashi	August 21, 1985	Studio 1	
Round Vernian Vifam: Kate's Memory	September 1985	Studio 3		
Dirty Pair: Affair of Nolandia	December 1985	Studio 1		
Panzer World Galient: Chapter of Ground	January 1986	Studio 1		
Panzer World Galient: Chapter of Sky	March 1986	Studio 1		
Armored Trooper VOTOMS: The Big Battle	Ryōsuke Takahashi	July 5, 1986	Studio 4	
Panzer World Galient: Chapter of Iron	August 1986	Studio 4		
Blue Comet SPT Layzner: Eiji 1996	August 1986	Studio 3		
Blue Comet SPT Layzner: Le Caine 1999	September 1986	Studio 3		
Blue Comet SPT Layzner: Engraved 2000	October 1986	Studio 3		
Heavy Metal L-Gaim: Pentagona Window + Lady Gablae	November 1986	Studio 2		
Heavy Metal L-Gaim: Farewell My Lovely + Pentagona Dolls	January 1987	Studio 2		
Dirty Pair: From Lovely Angels with Love	January 1987	Studio 4		
DOUGRAM vs ROUND-FACER	January 1987	Studio 1		
Heavy Metal L-Gaim: Fullmetal Soldier	March 1987	Studio 7		
Dead Heat	July 1987	Studio 2		
Original Dirty Pair	December 1987–April 1988	Studio 1		
Armored Trooper Votoms: Roots of Ambition	February 1988	Studio 7		
New Story of Aura Battler DUNBinE	February 1988–August 1988	Studio 1		
Mobile Suit SD Gundam	March 1988–August 1991	Studio 5 & Studio 3		
Starship Troopers	October 1988–December 1988	Studio 5		
Armor Hunter Mellowlink	November 1988–April 1989	Studio 1		
Crusher Joe: The Ice Prison	February 1989	Studio 1		
Mobile Suit Gundam 0080: War in the Pocket	March 1989–August 1989	Studio 5		
Ronin Warriors Gaiden	April 1989–June 1989	Studio 2		
Crusher Joe: The Ultimate Weapon: Ash	June 1989	Studio 1		
Shin Mashin Hero Wataru	August 1989–September 1989	Studio 7		
Ronin Warriors: Legend of the inferno Armor	October 1989–January 1990	Studio 2		
Dirty Pair: Flight 005 Conspiracy	January 1990	Studio 1		
SD Gundam Gaiden	March 1990–March 1991	Studio 5		
City Hunter: Bay City Wars	August 1990	Studio 3		
City Hunter: Million Dollar Conspiracy	August 1990	Studio 3		
Madō King Granzort: The Final Magical Battle	August 1990–September 1990	Studio 7		
Patlabor: The New Files	November 1990–April 1992	Studio 1		
Mobile Suit SD Gundam Scramble	March 1991–August 1991	Studio 5		
Ronin Warriors MESSAGE	March 1991–August 1991	Studio 2		
Mobile Suit Gundam 0083: Stardust Memory	May 1991–September 1992	Studio 3		
Madō King Granzort: The Mado Stone	March 1992–June 1992	Studio 7		
Raijin-Oh FinAL	September 1992–February 1993	Studio 5		
Future GPX Cyber Formula 11	November 1992–June 1993	Studio 7		
Mashin Hero Wataru: The Endless Story	October 1993–February 1994	Studio 7		
Dirty Pair Flash	February 1994–April 1996	Studio 2 & Studio 5		
Armored Trooper Votoms: Shining Heresy	March 1994–December 1994	Studio 5		
Future GPX Cyber Formula ZERO	April 1994–February 1995	Studio 7		
Ryū Knight: Adeu's Legend	July 1994–May 1996	Studio 1		
Iron Leaguer: Under of The Banner of Silver Light	November 1994–April 1995	Studio 3		
City Hunter: The Secret Service	January 1996	Studio 3		
The Silent Service	March 1996–January 1998	Studio 3 (VOYAGE.01 (March 1996)) → Studio 9 (VOYAGE.02 & VOYAGE.03 (September 1997–January 1998))		
Future GPX Cyber Formula EARLYDAYS RENEWAL	April 1996–June 1996	Studio 7		
Future GPX Cyber Formula SAGA	August 1996–July 1997	Studio 10		
City Hunter: Good-Bye My Sweetheart	April 1997	Studio 6		
Brave Command Dagwon: The Boy with Crystal Eyes	October 1997–December 1997	Studio 7		
GUNDAM Mission to the Rise	August 1998	Sunrise D.I.D		
Dinozaurs	December 1998	Sunrise D.I.D		
Future GPX Cyber Formula Sin	December 1998–March 2000	Studio 10		
Z-Mind	February 1999–July 1999	Studio 8		
City Hunter: Death of the Vicious Criminal Ryo Saeba	April 1999	Studio 8		
Gundam Wing: Operation Meteor	April 1999–May 1999	Studio 1		
Gundam Wing: Endless Waltz	May 1999–June 1999	Studio 1		
Aesop World	April 1999–December 1999	Studio 5		
The King of Braves GaoGaiGar Final	January 2000–March 2003	Studio 7		
Passage of the Stars - Birth	April 2000	Studio 5		
Crest of the Stars: SPECIAL	April 2000	Studio 5		
G-Saviour	December 2000	Sunrise D.I.D		
ZOE: 2167 IDOLO	March 2001	Studio 6		
Afro Ken	June 2001	Sunrise D.I.D		
Banner of the Stars: SPECIAL	July 2001	Studio 5		
Argento Soma: Alone and by myself	February 2002	Studio 9		
Kagero Kakun	May 2003		In association with TMS Entertainment	
Gundam Evolve	September 2003–January 2007	Sunrise D.I.D		
Mobile Suit Gundam SEED AFTER PHASE	March 2004	Studio 9		
Mobile Suit Gundam MS IGLOO	July 2004–April 2009	Sunrise D.I.D		
Mobile Suit Gundam SEED: Special Edition	August 2004–October 2004	Studio 9		
Mobile Suit Zeta Gundam: A New Translation	May 2005–March 2006	Studio 7		
Hotori - A Simple Wish for Joy	August 2005	Nerima Studio		
Banner of the Stars III	August 2005–September 2005	Studio 5		
Mobile Suit Gundam SEED Destiny: FinAL PLUS	December 2005	Studio 3		
The Wings of Rean	December 2005–August 2006	Nerima Studio		
Mobile Suit Gundam SEED Destiny: Special Edition	May 2006–January 2007	Studio 3		
Cluster Edge Secret Episode	September 2006	Studio 1		
Mobile Suit Gundam SEED C.E. 73: Stargazer	November 2006	Studio 3		
My-Otome Zwei	November 2006–August 2007	Studio 8		
Freedom Project	November 2006–May 2008	Nerima Studio		
SOS! Tokyo Metro Explorers: The Next	May 2007	Sunrise D.I.D		
Armored Trooper Votoms: Pailsen Files	October 2007–August 2008	Sunrise D.I.D		
Code Geass: Black Rebellion	February 2008	Studio 4		
My-Otome 0~S.ifr~	February 2008–November 2008	Studio 8		
Urusei Yatsura: The Obstacle Course Swim Meet	December 2008	Studio 8		
Code Geass: Zero Requiem	July 2009	Studio 4		
Mobile Suit Gundam 00 Special Edition	October 2009–February 2010	Studio 3		
Hipira: The Little Vampire	December 2009	Nerima Studio		
Black God: Tiger and Wings	December 2009	Studio 11		
My-HiME: The Black Dance	January 2010	Studio 8		
My-Otome: The Holy Maiden's Prayer	March 2010	Studio 8		
Armored Trooper Votoms: The Phantom Chapter	March 2010–October 2010	Sunrise D.I.D		
Mobile Suit Gundam Unicorn	March 2010–June 2014	Studio 1		
Model Suit Gunpla Builders Beginning G	August 2010–December 2010	Sunrise D.I.D		
Armored Trooper Votoms: Case;Irvine	November 2010	Studio 8		
Votoms Finder	December 2010	Sunrise D.I.D		
Armored Trooper Votoms: Alone Again	January 2011	Sunrise D.I.D		
Coicent	February 2011	Nerima Studio		
Five Numbers!	April 2011	Nerima Studio		
Code Geass: Nunnally in Wonderland	July 2012	Studio 4		
Code Geass: Akito the Exiled	August 2012–February 2016	Studio 4		
Accel World: Awakening of the Silver Wings	October 2012	Studio 8		
Mobile Suit Gundam: The 08th MS Team: Battle in Three Dimensions	February 2013	Studio 3		
Mobile Suit Gundam AGE: Memory of Eden	July 2013	Studio 3	In association with Level-5	
Buddy Complex: The Final Chapter	September 2014	Studio 8		
Mobile Suit Gundam: The Origin	February 2015–November 2016			
Mobile Suit Gundam Thunderbolt	December 2015-June 2016			
Gundam Build Fighters Try: Island Wars	August 2016	Studio 3		
Mobile Suit Gundam: Twilight Axis	June 2017			
Gundam Build Fighters: GM's Counterattack	August 2017			
Gundam Build Fighters: Battlogue	August 2017			
Isekai Izakaya ~Koto Aitheria no Izakaya Nobu~	April 2018–September 2018			
Gundam Build Divers Re:Rise	October 10, 2019 – August 20, 2020	Sunrise Beyond Inc.	Sequel to the anime Gundam Build Divers.	
Mashin Hero Wataru: The Seven Spirits of Ryujinmaru	April 10, 2020 – November 20, 2020			
Artiswitch	May 2021–September 2021			
Gundam: Requiem for Vengeance	October 2024		Co-production with SAFEHOUSE	
Fool Night	November 2026		Co-production with Shaft	

=== Television specials ===
Title	Year(s)	Broadcast network(s)	Studios	Notes
White Fang Story	May 5, 1982	TBS	White Fang Group	Based on the novel by Jack London.
Obatarian	April 1990	TV Asahi	Studio 3	
Hotori: Simply Wishing for Hope	August 25, 2005	Animax	Ogikubo Studio	
Mobile Suit Gundam Seed Destiny: Final Plus: The Chosen Future	December 25, 2005	TBS	Studio 3	Part of the Gundam franchise. Director's cut version of episode 50 "The Final Power"
Gundam Build Fighters Try: Island Wars	August 21, 2016	TV Tokyo	Studio 3	

=== Foreign production history ===
Title	Year(s)	Broadcast network(s)	Studios	Notes
Inspector Gadget	September 5, 1983 – November 13, 1985	Syndication	DIC Audiovisuel	Additional services for TMS Entertainment for the ink and painting process
Jayce and the Wheeled Warriors	September 1985–December 1985	Syndication	DIC Audiovisuel	
The Centurions	April 1986–December 1986	Syndication	Studio 7; Ruby-Spears Productions	
Batman: The Animated Series	September 5, 1992 – September 15, 1995	Fox	Studio 6; Warner Bros. Animation	
Exosquad	September 18, 1993 – November 3, 1994	Syndication	Universal Animation Studios	Season 2 Additional Storyboards
Street Fighter	October 21, 1995 – May 14, 1997	USA Network	Studio 1	Co-production with Capcom, Graz Entertainment, InVision Entertainment, Madhouse Studios, and USA Studios
Siegfried & Roy: Masters of the Impossible	February 19, 1996 – February 22, 1996	Fox	DIC Productions, L.P.	
Argai: The Prophecy	September 2000–March 2001		Carrere Groupe	Co-production with D'Ocon Films Productions and La Coloniale

=== Video game animation work ===
Title	Year(s)	Notes
Valis: The Fantasm Soldier	1986	
Suishō no Dragon	1986	
Blazing Lazers	1989	
SD Gundam Neo Batoringu	1995	
Brave Saga	1998	
Real Bout Fatal Fury Special: Dominated Mind	1998	
Sunrise Heroes	1999	
Brave Saga 2	2000	
Sunrise Heroes 2	2001	
Mobile Suit Gundam: Journey to Jaburo	2001	
Zone of the Enders: The Fist of Mars	2001	
Mobile Suit Gundam: Zeonic Front	2001	
Sunrise World War	2003	
Mobile Suit Gundam: Encounters in Space	2003	
Mobile Suit Gundam: Gundam vs. Zeta Gundam	2004	
Inuyasha: The Secret of the Cursed Mask	2004	
Brave Wars	2005	
Battle of Sunrise	2008	
Tales of the Heroes: Twin Brave	2012	
Zone of the Enders HD Collection	2012	
Xuccess Heaven	2015	
Starwing Paradox	2018	
Love Live! School Idol Festival All Stars	2019	
Scarlet Nexus	2021	
Tales of Luminaria	2021	Co-production with Kamikaze Douga
Saikyō Kamizmode: Burst Spirits	2024	

=== Miscellaneous ===
- Nagoya TV (1981–1987, The "Space Boy" mascot opening/closing credits)
- Pink Crows (did the animation and designs for this animated band and their music videos)
- Shadow of China (1989 live action movie)
- Cold Fever (1994, live action movie co-produced with Icelandic Film Corporation, Iciclefilm, Pandora Film, Zentropa Entertainments and George Gund III)
- Pop Team Epic (2020–2022, Series 1 Special Episode 1 1st half prologue skit and opening animation; Series 2 Episode 2 story part and ending animation)
- Cowboy Bebop (2021, live action TV series co-produced with Netflix, Midnight Radio and Tomorrow Studios)

== International distribution ==
Most anime produced by Sunrise and licensed by Bandai Visual in Japan was licensed and distributed in the United States by Bandai Entertainment and in Europe by Beez Entertainment, but both companies shut down in 2012 after Bandai Entertainment's restructuring. In North America, distributors such as Crunchyroll, Viz Media, Sentai Filmworks, NIS America and Aniplex of America, as well as Sunrise USA, have licensed Sunrise properties. In Europe, Anime Limited and Manga Entertainment (in the UK) and Kazé (in France) have begun to distribute titles distributed by Beez and other unreleased Sunrise productions. In Australia, Sunrise productions are licensed and distributed by Madman Entertainment. At Anime Boston 2013, Sunrise confirmed that they would begin licensing anime in North America and were negotiating with Sentai, Funimation, and Viz to distribute their titles on DVD and Blu-ray. Right Stuf agreed to distribute and re-release Mobile Suit Gundam Unicorn on DVD in North America. In 2014 the deal expanded, releasing the Gundam previously licensed by Bandai Entertainment (Mobile Suit Gundam, Turn A Gundam) and several works not released in North America (including Mobile Suit Gundam ZZ) in 2015.
