= Zero Tester =

Japanese anime television series

- Also known as: Zero Tester: Save the Earth! (season 2)
- ゼロテスター
- Genre: Mecha
- Created by: Yoshitake Suzuki
- Directed by: Kazuo Nakamura (#1–39); Ryosuke Takahashi (#40–66)
- Music by: Nayazumi Yamamoto
- Country of origin: Japan
- Original language: Japanese
- No. of seasons: 2
- No. of episodes: 66

Production
- Production companies: KTV; Soeisha

Original release
- Network: FNS (KTV, Fuji TV)
- Release: October 1, 1973 – December 30, 1974

Zero Tester (ゼロテスター, Zerotesutā) is a mecha anime series produced by Tohokushinsha and animated by Soeisha (later renamed as Nippon Sunrise).

It consists of 66 episodes and was originally broadcast on Fuji TV. The first 39 episodes tell the attempted invasion of the earth by Armanoid aliens, while the remaining 27 episodes, with the series retitled Zero Tester: Save the Earth! (Chikyu o Mamotte!), are about an attack by Gallos aliens.

According to Jonathan Clements and Helen McCarthy's The Anime Encyclopedia, it was "an early gathering of many of anime's future greats, particularly for the Gundam series".

== Production ==
This was the first directorial work by Ryosuke Takahashi. In response to the failure of Hazedon in the previous year, the second work of Soeisha changed the project content from marine adventure to science fiction.

"Thunderbird was a Japanese copyright," Tohokushinsha planning as a concept of "Japanese-made Thunderbird" was produced as the No. 2 work of creation Utsusha a subsidiary. In contrast to "Hazedon," which failed in terms of audience rating, this work succeeded in terms of audience rating.

Initially, the Zero Tester was also in a scenario that eventually led to battle in the incident investigation and rescue mission, but the battle color was strengthened by repeated route changes.

At the end of the next announcement, the line "Let's charge this channel again next week" was always included.

The credit for the mechanical design "John Dedowa", is actually a fictitious person. In reality Studio Nue, which was known as Crystal Art Studio at the time, was behind the designs.

== Cast ==
- Akira Kamiya as Shin Fubuki
- Iemasa Kayumi as Moebius
- Kiyoshi Kawakubo as Dr. Tachibana
- Noriko Ohara as Hiroshi
- Ryūsei Nakao as Gou Araishi
- Taichirō Hirokawa as Tsutomu Kenmotsu
- Yōko Asagami as Lisa

== Characters ==
=== Earth side (main characters) ===
==== Snowstorm/Blizzard Shin (吹雪 シン/ふぶき シン) ====
Voice - Akira Kamiya (神谷明)

Tester No. 1, Mark 1 pilot. He is called "Fubuki" in the play but is rarely referred to by name.

==== Araishi/Storm Go (荒石 ゴー/あらし ゴー) ====
Voice - Tomoharu Takeo (竹尾智晴) (Now known as Ryusei Nakao (中尾隆聖))

Tester No. 1, Mark 2 pilot. In the play he is called "Arashi" but is rarely referred to by name. In episode 49, it is revealed that he is from Jupiter's space colony and he lost his mother in an accident when he was a boy.

==== Lisa (リサ) ====
Voice - Yoko Asagami (麻上洋子) (Now known as Ichiryusai Harumi (一龍斎春水))

Tester No. 1, Mark 3 female pilot.

=== Earth side (others) ===
==== Yang (ヤン) ====
Voice - Shun Yashiro ( 八代駿)

A technician dedicated to the tester corps. He invents and develops various items used by the tester corps.

==== Hiroshi (ヒロシ) ====
Voice - Noriko Ohara (小原乃梨子)

Son of Dr. Tachibana.

==== Tsutomu Kenmochi (剣持勉) ====
Voice - Taichiro Hirokawa (広川太一郎)

==== Dr. Tachibana (タチバナ博士) ====
Voice - Kiyoshi Kawakubo (川久保潔)

The role of the chief executive officer of the tester corps.

==== Dr. Gao (ガオ博士) ====
Voice - Kosei Tomita (富田耕生)

A friend of Dr. Tachibana. The developer of Crusher 7, the battle robot in episode 50.

==== Kazemaki (風巻) ====
Voice - Ryoichi Tanaka (田中亮一)

A male member who was appointed as a Mark 3 pilot in place of Lisa in episode 54. Severely injured during the battle with Dragon Garros.

==== Ann (アン) ====
Voice - Mitsuyo Tobe (戸部光代)

Appeared in episode 60. Crew of a space surveillance ship. Died in the line of duty due to an attack by Specter Garos.

==== Joe Kelly (ジョー・ケリー) ====
Voice - Rokuro Naya (納谷六朗)

Appeared in Episode 64. Built by Kuronuma Dr. (actually Amanoido). He has enough fighting power to defeat the Zoomers alone. He carried a bomb activated by Kuronuma.

== Broadcast list ==
Episode Number	On-air date	Episode Title	Writer	Conte	Director	Appearing enemy mecha	Guest Voice
1	1973; October 1	The birth of Zero Tester	Fuyunori Gobu		Kazuo Nakamura	Armanoid Tank	
2	October 8	Hit the hurricane top!	Haruya Yamazaki		Kazuo Nakamura	Hurricane top	
3	October 15	Pit of the Universe	Satoshi Inoue		Kazuo Nakamura	Planetary Fortress, Bomb Robot	
4	October 22	SOS First Planet Base	Fuyunori Gobu		Kazuo Nakamura	Armanoid Robot	
5	October 29	Horror Human Remodeling Machine	Fuyunori Gobu		Kazuo Nakamura	Golem	
6	November 5	Dispatch Tester No. 3!	Haruya Yamazaki		Kazuo Nakamura	Submarine Bethbias	
7	November 12	Blow up the underground power plant!	Satoshi Inoue		Kazuo Nakamura	Armanoid bats	
8	November 19	Antarctic Operation	Hino Takamoto		Kazuo Nakamura	Whale-class submarine	
9	November 26	Fubuki! Zero life support	String Goro		Kazuo Nakamura	King (Pharaoh) Robot (Voice: Hisayoshi Yoshizawa), Prince Robot (Voice: Akira Kamiya)	
10	December 3	The Earth Burns	Haruya Yamazaki		Kazuo Nakamura	Machine Bird	
11	December 10	Protect the laser car!	Satoshi Inoue		Kazuo Nakamura	Monster Butterfly	
12	December 17	Hit the Space Fortress!	Ryosuke Takahashi		Kazuo Nakamura		
13	December 24	Armanoid Gifts	Yu Yamamoto * 1		Kazuo Nakamura		
14	December 31	Mobius's Counterattack	Fuyunori Gobu		Kazuo Nakamura		
15	1974; January 7	Close call! Three people aimed at	Haruya Yamazaki		Kazuo Nakamura	Lightning laser	
16	January 14	Scoop the Sun!	Satoshi Inoue		Kazuo Nakamura		
17	January 21	Aimed Undersea City	Yu Yamamoto		Kazuo Nakamura		
18	January 28	Space Jellyfish Polyp	Haruya Yamazaki		Kazuo Nakamura	Polyp	
19	February 4	Yousei Silver Bronco	Satoshi Inoue		Kazuo Nakamura		
20	February 11	Crazy Artificial Sun	Kenichi Matsuzaki; Masaaki Sakurai		Kazuo Nakamura		
21	February 18	The tanker spacecraft that was taken over	Gengoro		Kazuo Nakamura		
22	February 25	Fear of 10,000 km / s	Fuyunori Gobu		Kazuo Nakamura		
23	March 4	Shoot down the planetary machine	Yu Yamamoto		Kazuo Nakamura		
24	March 11	A space ghost appeared !!	Fuyunori Gobu		Kazuo Nakamura	Monster	
25	March 18	Break through the spider web barrier	Satoshi Inoue		Kazuo Nakamura	Arabella	
26	March 25	Monster Brain Mad	Fuyunori Gobu		Kazuo Nakamura	Mad	
27	April 1	Secret Tester Machine Z-1	Fuyunori Gobu		Kazuo Nakamura		
28	April 8	The artificial island was intimidated!	Fuyunori Gobu		Kazuo Nakamura		
29	April 15	Dr. Tachibana's Uragiri?	Haruya Yamazaki		Kazuo Nakamura	Ladybugs Rocket	
30	April 22	Fierce fight! Confrontation with Dekuninger	Yu Yamamoto		Kazuo Nakamura	Dekuninger	
31	April 29	Strong enemy! Robot Great Fortress	String Goro		Kazuo Nakamura	Dinosaur Robot Fortress	
32	May 6	Remodeled Barghis Counterattack	Fuyunori Gobu		Kazuo Nakamura	Remodeled Barghis	
33	May 13	Armanoid Deep Sea Trap	Yu Yamamoto		Kazuo Nakamura		
34	May 20	Captain Desperate Counterattack	String Goro		Kazuo Nakamura	Centipede Tank	
35	May 27	Appearance! Mecha Plant Dyler	Yoshiaki Yoshida		Kazuo Nakamura	Iron-eating Mushroom, Dyler	
36	June 3	Cryonic Humans!	String Goro		Kazuo Nakamura	Temperature Sensing Robot	
37	June 10	Target is Zero Tester	Yu Yamamoto		Kazuo Nakamura		
38	June 17	Zero Robot Appears	Yoshiaki Yoshida		Kazuo Nakamura	Phantom Fish Submarine	
39	June 24	The End of the Strong Enemy Bargis	Fuyunori Gobu	Noboru Ishiguro	Kazuo Nakamura	King Squid Gander	
40	July 1	Garos Seven People Appeared	Fuyunori Gobu	Yoshiyuki Tomino		(Credit) It has not been)	Garos Seven People, Decoy Robot
41	July 8	Invasion of Animal Garos	Gengoro	Yoshikazu Yasuhiko		(Credit) It has not been)	Animal Garos (Voice: Kiyoshi Kobayashi)
42	July 15	I'm here! Dinosaur Army	Ryosuke Takahashi	Yoshiyuki Tomino		(Credit) It has not been)	Dinosaur Garos (Voice: Shozo Iizuka)
43	July 22	Intense! Ashlanger	Yu Yamamoto	Seiji Okuda	Yuichiro Yokoyama	(Credit) It has not been)	Warrior Garos Ashlanger (Voice: Kenji Utsumi), Iron buffalo
44	July 29	Ambush of Fire Garos	Yu Yamamoto	Noboru Ishiguro	Kazunori Tanahashi	(Credit) It has not been)	Fire Garos (Voice: Shojiro Kihara)
45	August 5	Challenge of Esper Garos	Soji Yoshikawa	Yoshikazu Yasuhiko		(Credit) It has not been)	Esper Garos (Voice: Ikuo Nishikawa)
46	August 12	Yokai Gamagaros	Yoshiaki Yoshida	Yoshikazu Yasuhiko		(Credit) It has not been)	Gamagaros (Voice: Junpei Takiguchi)
47	August 19	Three-stage deformed Garos	String Goro	Hisashi Sakaguchi	Yuichiro Yokoyama	(Credit) It has not been)	Transformed Garos (Voice: Reizo Nomoto)
48	August 26	Fear of Mecha Ants	Yu Yamamoto	Yoshiyuki Tomino		(Credit) It has not been)	Black Demon (Voice: Shozo Iizuka)
49	September 2	Zero Flight of Trials	Soji Yoshikawa	Noboru Ishiguro	Kazunori Tanahashi	(Credit) It has not been)	Armageddon (Voice: Yoshihisa Kamo)
50	September 9	Advance! Crusher 7	Yu Yamamoto	Yoshikazu Yasuhiko		(Credit) It has not been)	Super Garos (voice: Mikio Terashima)
51	September 16	Transparent Garos Trap	Yu Yamamoto	Seiji Okuda	Yuichiro Yokoyama	(Credit) It has not been)	Transparent Garos (Voice: Kenji Utsumi)
52	September 23	Three Stars Launch	Yoshiaki Yoshida	Yoshiyuki Tomino		(Credit) It has not been)	Magmagaros (Voice: Shozo Iizuka)
53	September 30	Unit 2 Fortress Plan	Yu Yamamoto		Kazunori Tanahashi	Nobuyoshi Sasakado	Hydragaros
54	October 7	Deep Sea Zero Charge	Yoshikazu Yasuhiko		Yoshikazu Yasuhiko		Dragon Garos (Voice: Reizo Nomoto)
55	October 14	Shoot the Garos Bullet Train	Yu Yamamoto		Yuichiro Yokoyama	Kazuo Nakamura	
56	October 21	Phantom Zero Tester	Yu Yamamoto		Yoshikazu Yasuhiko		Introductory Garos (Voice: Teiji Omiya)
57	October 28	Underground Garos Sasoligula	Gengoro		Yoshiyuki Tomino	Kazuo Nakamura	Underground Garos Sasoligula (Voice: Uncredited)
58	November 4	Transform Zero Buggy!	Soji Yoshikawa		Kazunori Tanahashi	Nobuyoshi Sasakado	Bagindagaros (Voice: Toshihiko Kojima * 2)
59	November 11	Escape the Bomb Island	Yoshiaki Yoshida		Yuichiro Yokoyama	Saburo Sakamoto	Bomb Garos (Voice: Masashi Amenomori)
60	November 18	Devil's Specter Garos	Kazuo Terada		Kazuo Terada	Kazuo Nakamura	Specter Garos (Voice: Shozo Iizuka)
61	November 25	The Secret of Yuki Shonen Robot	Soji Yoshikawa		Yoshikazu Yasuhiko		Bison Garos (Voice: Rei Nomoto) three)
62	December 2	SOS! Robot Tournament	Masaaki Sakurai		Yoshiyuki Tomino	(Credit) It has not been)	Driller Garos (voice: Shozo Iizuka)
63	December 9	Laughter of Hell Garos	Yu Yamamoto	Yoshikazu Yasuhiko	Yuichiro Yokoyama	Nobuyoshi Sasakado	Hell Garos (voice: Mikio Terashima)
64	December 16	Horror Cyborg Plan	Soji Yoshikawa		Kazuo Terada	Saburo Sakamoto	Zoomer (Voice: Reizo Nomoto)
65	December 23	Armanoid Star Approaching	Yu Yamamoto		Yoshikazu Yasuhiko		Bangers
66	December 30	The end of the Armanoid star	Fuyunori Gobu		Yoshiyuki Tomino	Nobuyoshi Sasakado	Armanoid star, multi-warhead nuclear missile

* 1 The credit is misprinted as "Yu Yamamoto".
* 2 You are a racer with credit.
