= Fang of the Sun Dougram =

Japanese anime television series

- 太陽の牙ダグラム
- Genre: Mecha; Military Science Fiction
- Created by: Hajime Yatate (concept); Ryōsuke Takahashi (story); Hiroyuki Hoshiyama (story)
- Developed by: Hiroyuki Hoshiyama
- Directed by: Ryōsuke Takahashi; Takeyuki Kanda
- Music by: Toru Fuyuki
- Country of origin: Japan
- Original language: Japanese
- No. of episodes: 75

Production
- Producer: Masami Iwasaki
- Production company: Nippon Sunrise

Original release
- Network: TV Tokyo
- Release: 23 October 1981 – 25 March 1983

Related
- Anime film

Dougram: Documentary of the Fang of the Sun
- Directed by: Ryosuke Takahashi
- Produced by: Masami Iwasaki; Tetsuhisa Yamada
- Written by: Ryosuke Takahashi; Hiroyuki Hoshiyama; Yuji Watanabe; Sukehiro Tomita; Yoshitake Suzuki
- Music by: Tooru Fuyuki
- Studio: Nippon Sunrise
- Released: 9 July 1983
- Runtime: 80 minutes
- Anime film

Choro-Q Dougram
- Directed by: Masanori Miura
- Music by: Tooru Fuyuki
- Studio: Nippon Sunrise
- Released: 9 July 1983
- Runtime: 9 minutes
- Original video animation

Dougram vs. Round-Facer
- Studio: Nippon Sunrise
- Released: 21 January 1987
- Runtime: 24 minutes

Fang of the Sun Dougram (太陽の牙ダグラム, Taiyou no Kiba Daguramu) is a 75-episode anime television series, created by Ryosuke Takahashi and Sunrise, and aired in Japan from October 23, 1981, to March 25, 1983, on TV Tokyo. A 1983 full-length feature film, Dougram: Documentary of the Fang of the Sun, summarized the series.

== Plot ==
The series begins in a desert on the colony planet Deloyer, where the remains of a destroyed robot are resting as a red-haired woman is standing in front of it. The woman hallucinates what appears to be a group of armed soldiers alongside the robot in a non-destroyed state. A man named Rocky appears, leading to the woman running into his embrace where she cries tears of joy. After this, the series flashes back to an earlier time, in order to explain the circumstances leading up to the first episode.

Malcontents on the Deloyer colony agitate for the independence of their world from the Earth Federation. In an unexpected coup d'état, the elected Governor declares martial law and sets himself up as absolute dictator. With the approval of the Federation, he rules the planet with an iron fist. In reaction, a ragtag group (including the governor's estranged son) rises in open rebellion, using a powerful prototype Combat Armor: the Dougram. Their goal is the end of the dictatorship and total independence from the Federation's influence.

The story follows the actions of the guerilla freedom fighters known as "The Deloyer 7". The war is fought across the planet Deloyer as the Federation vigorously pursues the rebels. The series is noted for its realistic use of not just the combat armors and support vehicles, but also military tactics. The series also followed a wide range of characters and political intrigue, with many shady characters switching sides throughout the series.

Crinn Cashim is the show's main character. Son of Governor Donan Cashim, he becomes trained in piloting the Soltic Roundfacer by Jacky Zaltsev, a Federation Ace, because of his father's political connections. When his father appears to be overthrown by a coup led by Colonel Von Stein, he pilots a Roundfacer while Federation forces battle Garcia's forces. He is stunned to learn that his father has actually sided with Von Stein in a secret plan, and eventually becomes angry at his father's forces in how they deal with the rebellion following the coup. Following a meeting with Dr. David Samalin, who introduces him to a combat armor he has designed, the Dougram, Cashim and his friends form The Fang of the Sun and join the rebellion against the Federation.

== Voice actors ==
- Kazuhiko Inoue as Crinn Cashim
- Banjou Ginga as Chico Biento
- Eiji Kanie as Von Stein
- Eiko Yamada as Canary Donett
- Gara Takashima as Daisy Ohsel (also spelled Auxerre)
- Hirotaka Suzuoki as Gabor Zana
- Ikuya Sawaki as Soldier (Ep. 6)
- Issei Futamata as Aaron
- Issei Masamune as Hank, Rabin Cashim
- Kaneto Shiozawa as Royle Cashim
- Kazuyuki Sogabe as J. Locke
- Keiko Ozaki as Dalloway
- Kenichi Ogata as Nanashi, Watkins
- Kiyonobu Suzuki as Festa Bronco
- Kiyoshi Komiyama as Heckle G. Thompson
- Kōhei Miyauchi as Professor David Samalin
- Kōzō Shioya as Brink
- Masaaki Tsukada as Emond
- Masaharu Satō as Dirk
- Masaru Ikeda as Rick Boyd
- Masashi Hirose as Cole Destin
- Masato Yamanouchi as Donan Cashim, Narrator
- Nana Yamaguchi as Fina Cashim
- Osamu Kato as Hesse Carmel
- Ritsuo Sawa as Station Employee (Ep. 1)
- Ryōichi Tanaka as Rocky Andor
- Ryūsuke Ōbayashi as York
- Shigeru Chiba as Giorgio Giordan, Oppe
- Shigeyuki Hosoi as Bucks
- Shigezō Sasaoka as Brian (Eps. 38-39)
- Shingo Kanemoto as Dick Lertoff
- Shōzō Iizuka as Haman (Ep. 23)
- Tatsuyuki Jinnai as Helmut J. Lecoque
- Tesshō Genda as Vuldran Garcia
- Youko Kawanami as Rita Berette
- Yuji Fujishiro as Morrea Ohsel/Auxerre
- Yuri Nashiwa as Billy Bol
- Yusaku Yara as Jackie Zaltsev

== Combat Armors ==
The Dougram Combat Armor

In S.C. 140 (Dougram time system, meaning Space Century), the Federal military asked for an all-terrain heavy-weapon system to deal with the varied geographic conditions of the colony worlds. Only two companies made it through the extensive requirements testing: Abitate and Soltic.

Abitate's F44A "Crabgunner" was a 12-meter, 4-legged walking tank. Soltic's own H8 "Roundfacer" was humanoid, with a single pilot located in the head. The simpler Crabgunner became the mainstay of the early Federation forces, but it was the Roundfacer that would revolutionize mechanized warfare. As the rebellion grows in number, the Federation introduces new models of Combat Armors to oppose it, many of them designed to fulfill specific roles (desert fighting, cold weather deployment, etc.). Unlike other anime, these new machines are production models and rarely one-of-a-kind prototypes (the Dougram itself being the most notable exception). Combat Armors used by the Sun Fang rebels are marked with a gold-bordered red triangle. The Federation Occupation Forces use gold chevrons to indicate the division they are assigned to (1st, 2nd, or 3rd).

The following list showcases the machines seen in the show. The terms "Soltic" and "Abitate", actually represent the names of the companies that built the combat armors, not the names of the machines themselves. The "common names", if any, are given in quotes.

=== First Generation ===
- Abitate F44A "Crab Gunner": Height: 12.2 m. Weight: 34.621 tons. The first Combat Armor, its design nevertheless influences further designs, although its shortcomings become apparent in battles facing other Combat Armors. In terms of weapons it has a linear gun on its top, armed with a 12.7mm machine gun on the cannon's top, a 30mm machine gun on their front, and a 7-tube missile pod on each side of the body.
- Abitate F44B "Tequila Gunner": Height: 12.13 m. Weight: 35.001 tons. First introduced in by Locke, the Tequila Gunner is used in a support role, much of the time battling the Deloyer 7 team from a distance. In terms of weapons it has a linear gun on its top, armed with a 12.7mm machine gun on the cannon's top, a 30mm cannon in their front, and a 7-tube missile launcher on each side with two under the cockpit. Each side also had a balcony for gunmen. Once the Desert Gunner is developed, the Tequila Gunner is phased out.
- Abitate F44D "Desert Gunner": Height: 15.87 m. Weight: 35.914 tons. These six-legged armors are apt at negotiating treacherous sand banks in desert environments where bipedal mecha like Dougram, having more weight-per-inch ground pressure, are particularly clumsy and less effective. In terms of weapons it has a linear gun on its top, a 30mm machine gun on their front, and a 9-tube missile pod on each side of the body. Their judicious use by the veteran Garcia Company brings Dougram dangerously close to total defeat.

=== Second Generation ===
- Nicholiev AG-9 "Cabarov": Height: 9.36 m. Weight: 15.692 tons. A support Combat Armor that only appears near the end of series, and one of the few Combat Armors not designed by Abitate or Soltic. Unlike other models it is capable of 360 degree rotation at the waist. In terms of weapons it has a double linear cannon on the right side of the head, a 6-tube rocket pod on each hip, and three 30mm machine guns in each side of the head.
- Soltic H8 "Roundfacer": Height: 10.02 m. Weight: 20.965 tons. The mainstay of the Federation's Combat Armor forces, the Roundfacer is versatile and easy to produce. Its service runs right up to the final fight against the rebellion. In terms of weapons it has a 25mm chain gun in each wrist, a 9-tube missile pod on the right shoulder, and can wield either a hand linear gun which acts as a giant machine gun or a mag launcher which acts as a giant grenade launcher. The left shoulder is armed with a shield. Roundfacers can be stripped of their armor for a camouflage suit in heavy foliage terrain. For aerial assaults it can be given a giant hang glider.
  - Soltic H8-RF "Korchima Special" (24th Battalion Custom): Height: 10.09 m. Weight: 21.004 tons. This is an upgraded version of the Roundfacer, and only four of them are produced, and used by am elite Federation unit known as the Korchima Battalion. It incorporates a Laser on its forearm in-place of the Roundfacer's Linear Gun, and a powerpack for extended service. The Korchima Special is arguably more powerful than the Dougram, although Cashim's piloting skills gives him the upper-hand. Like standard Roundfacers these can be given a giant hang glider for aerial assaults.
- "Dougram": Height: 9.63 m. Weight: 20.120 tons. Exclusively developed by Samalin, the Dougram is based on the Federation's Roundfacer, and is able to use parts from salvaged Roundfacers to keep it running. During the series, the Dougram is customized for various missions, such as utilizing a Hang Glider like the Roundfacer, or a set of anti-aircraft guns to combat the Federation Duey helicopters that Cashim faces all-throughout the series. Its primary weapons consist of a linear gun on the right arm, a chaingun in the left arm, and can be given a turbopack for high jumping and has a large linear cannon that can be mounted on the left shoulder. The final version is known as the JAGD Type which replaces a set of smoke launchers on the sides of its head with a rocket pod similar to those mounted on the Roundfacer.
- Abitate T-10B "Blockhead": Height: 11.78 m. Weight: 31.102 tons. Really a prototype than a production model, this version of the Blockhead sports a red paint job and appears in a group of three that surprise the Deloyer 7 team. In terms of weapons it is armed with a mag launcher which acts like a giant grenade launcher or a double barreled anti-armor rifle, a 6-tube missile launcher on the left shoulder, and a double barreled machine gun turret on the head. Future Blockheads appear as the C Type.
  - Abitate T-10C "Blockhead": When the B Type proved successful, the Federation mass-produces the C Type, and it becomes one of the main weapons used by the Federation alongside its Roundfacer units.
- Soltic H-102 "Bushman": Height: 9.38 m. Weight: 18.951 tons. A light-weight Combat Armor originally designed for mountainous terrain. In terms of weapon it has a 6-tube bullet pod on each side of their head and a mag launcher which acts as a giant grenade launcher. The left shoulder is armed with a shield.
- Soltic H404S "Mackerel": Height: 8.7 m. Weight: 19.917 tons. The only amphibious Combat Armor shown in the series, and is used in conjunction with the Federation's Naval Fleets and during a massive D-Day type of landing against rebel forces. In terms of weapons it has a pair of 7-tube missile launchers in the abdomen and eight anti-armor guns in each wrist due to the arms being so large they could not operate normal combat armor firearms. It was capable of swimming up to 24 knots while underwater.

=== Third Generation ===
- Soltic HT-128 "Bigfoot": Height: 11.64 m. Weight: 27.043 tons. The largest and most powerful design of the Combat Armors developed by the Federation, it is used in winter conditions high up on the Kalnock mountain range. In terms of weapons they had a double barreled anti-armor rifle, a pair of smoke dispensers on each side of the neck base, and a 6-tube rocket pod on the left side of the head. While able to contribute to rebel losses, they were are unable to defeat the Dougram.
- Hasty F4X "Ironfoot": Height: 8.94 m. Weight: 29.963 tons. Originally a Federation design, the rebellion incorporates a number of them when an entire Federation army group switches sides during the conflict and joins the rebellion. In terms of weapons it had a linear gun on the right arm, a 9-tube missile pod on the left shoulder, and three smoke dispensers on the left side of the torso. It also goes by the nickname "Hasty".
- Abitate F35C "Blizzard Gunner": Height: 10.368 m. Weight: 29.65 tons. Deployed late in the series, the Blizzard Gunner becomes one of the main weapons used by the Federation in the region of Kalnock. In terms of weapons it has a linear gun on the main body, a 7-tube missile pod at the top, a 30mm cannon on the left side of their front, and three smoke dispensers on each side of the body.

== Influence ==
Dougram was one of the first successors to the "Real Robot" genre created by Mobile Suit Gundam. The popular mechanical designer Kunio Okawara produced the designs for both shows. Dougram featured a similar plot centered around a small team fighting a running battle with a powerful enemy, using an advanced giant robotic prototype combat armor. The show was a surprise success, especially considering the heavy emphasis on military tactics which slowed the pace of the story, and further confirmed that military 'giant robot' science-fiction was here to stay. Takahashi and Sunrise would go on create a follow-up series, Armored Trooper Votoms, which used similar styling and themes but was otherwise unrelated in plot, characters or setting.

== Merchandising ==
Toymaker Takara was the show's main licensee. They made a very successful plastic model kit series, a large number of diecast toys, and also released several strategy wargames set in the Dougram world. The latter included tiny, unpainted diecast combat armors as playing pieces; additional scale accessories were available separately.

The diecast toys were produced in three sizes. The 1:144 scale "Collection Series" featured a hollow diecast body and leg structure, with plastic detail parts. The "Dual Model Series" (in two scales, 1:72 and 1:48) featured a zinc-diecast endoskeleton upon which plastic armor pieces were attached. Although the imported toys were physically identical to the Japanese ones, the packages were modified for American shelves. The 1:144 scale boxes had sleeves to be hung from pegs, while the larger toys had English-language stickers glued over the original boxes.

Takara also produced a magnetically jointed Dougram and several soft-vinyl toys. Although the vinyls did not have specific scales, they appeared to be between 1:100 and 1:60 scale. Toy manufacturer Seven, a Takara spin-off devoted to low-end toys, produced several plastic and rubber Dougram toys as well.

Dougram appeared in the Harobots games alongside crab gunners and roundfacers. Dougram and both enemy combat armors reappeared in Brave Saga with more combat armors appearing in Brave Saga 2 including Desert Gunners, Cabarov, and Blockheads as well as MP-2 Dueys.

== Release outside Japan ==
Neither the film nor the television series were released in North America. However, plastic model kit manufacturer Revell released many of Takara's Dougram kits as characters in their Robotech Defenders series, and Takara sold much of their diecast toy line through American toy stores in the mid-1980s.

In the mid-1980s, American gaming company FASA Corporation used the vehicle designs of the show for its Battletech miniature wargame and role-playing game. The first edition, then named BattleDroids, actually included two Japanese 1/144 model kits from Dougram. FASA was later sued by Playmates Toys and Harmony Gold USA for using designs from Macross (for example, Valkyrie fighters renamed Stinger, Wasp and Phoenix Hawk). The lawsuit was settled and as a result, post-lawsuit Battletech products no longer feature the designs taken from Macross. However, in the years since, the designs from Macross, Dougram, and Crusher Joe have since been re-introduced, albeit with completely original artwork.

The Dougram tabletop battling game also came out in 1984, the same year Battletech (BattleDroids) was released in America.

== See also ==
- Dallos
