= Armored Trooper VOTOMS =

Japanese anime television series

- Cover for the third DVD Box Set, with an illustration of the ATM-09-ST Scopedog done by Kunio Okawara.

装甲騎兵ボトムズ (Sōkō Kihei Botomuzu)
- Genre: Mecha; Military sci-fi
- Created by: Hajime Yatate (concept); Ryōsuke Takahashi (story)
- Anime television series
- Directed by: Ryōsuke Takahashi
- Music by: Hiroki Inui
- Studio: Nippon Sunrise
- Licensed by: NA: Central Park Media (former); Maiden Japan
- Original network: MegaTON (TV Tokyo)
- Original run: April 1, 1983 – March 23, 1984
- Episodes: 52
Further information
Manga
Written by	Minoru Nonaka
Published by	Kodansha
Magazine	Comic BonBon
Original run	May 1983 – April 1984
Volumes	4
Original video animation
The Last Red Shoulder ~ The "Unknown" Red Shoulder
Directed by	Ryōsuke Takahashi
Written by	Sōji Yoshikawa
Music by	Hiroki Inui
Studio	Sunrise
Licensed by	NA: Maiden Japan
Released	August 21, 1985
Runtime	50 minutes
Original video animation
Big Battle ~ Battle of the Heterogeneous Species
Directed by	Ryōsuke Takahashi
Written by	Masanori Hama
Music by	Hiroki Inui
Studio	Sunrise
Licensed by	NA: Maiden Japan
Released	July 5, 1986
Runtime	60 minutes
Original video animation
Red Shoulder Document: Roots of Ambition
Directed by	Ryōsuke Takahashi
Written by	Sōji Yoshikawa
Music by	Hiroki Inui
Studio	Sunrise
Licensed by	NA: Maiden Japan
Released	March 19, 1988
Runtime	60 minutes
Original video animation
Armor Hunter Mellowlink
Directed by	Takeyuki Kanda
Written by	Ryōsuke Takahashi (story); Hiroshi Yamaguchi (screenplay)
Music by	Hiroki Inui
Studio	Sunrise
Released	November 21, 1988 – April 28, 1989
Runtime	25 minutes (each)
Episodes	12
Original video animation
Brilliantly Shining Heresy
Directed by	Ryōsuke Takahashi
Written by	Sōji Yoshikawa
Music by	Hiroki Inui
Studio	Sunrise
Licensed by	NA: Maiden Japan
Released	March 21, 1994 – December 21, 1994
Runtime	25 minutes (each)
Episodes	5
Original video animation
Phantom Arc
Directed by	Ryōsuke Takahashi
Written by	Fuyunori Gobu
Music by	Yasuaki Maejima
Studio	Sunrise
Licensed by	NA: Maiden Japan
Released	March 26, 2010 – October 27, 2010
Runtime	25 minutes (each)
Episodes	6
Original video animation
Case; Irvine
Directed by	Shishō Igarashi
Written by	Takuya Satō
Music by	Yoshihiro Ike
Studio	Sunrise
Licensed by	NA: Maiden Japan
Released	November 6, 2010
Runtime	50 minutes
Original video animation
Armored Trooperoid VOTOMS Finder
Directed by	Shigeta Atsushi
Written by	Masafumi Nishida
Music by	Kōtarō Nakagawa
Studio	Sunrise
Licensed by	NA: Maiden Japan
Released	December 4, 2010
Runtime	50 minutes
Original video animation
Alone Again
Directed by	Ryōsuke Takahashi
Written by	Masashi Ikeda
Music by	Tetsuro Oda
Studio	Sunrise
Licensed by	NA: Maiden Japan
Released	January 8, 2011
Runtime	50 minutes
Anime film series
Die Graue Hexe
Directed by	Mamoru Oshii
Written by	Ryōsuke Takahashi
Music by	Kenji Kawai
Studio	Sunrise
Released	November 20, 2026 – scheduled
Films	2
- OVA series
- Pailsen Files (2007–08)
- Games
- List of Armored Trooper Votoms games
- icon

Armored Trooper VOTOMS (Japanese: 装甲騎兵ボトムズ, Hepburn: Sōkō Kihei Botomuzu) is a Japanese military science fiction mecha anime series produced by Nippon Sunrise, created and directed by Ryosuke Takahashi and featuring mecha designs by Kunio Okawara. Following directly in the footsteps of Takahashi's previous series, Fang of the Sun Dougram, VOTOMS continued the trend towards hard science in the mecha anime subgenre.

The series was supplemented by numerous original video animation releases and also inspired several spin-off works whose media ranges from serialized light novels to video games. The TV anime was originally licensed by the now-defunct Central Park Media, which released the series on DVD and VHS. Currently, it is licensed by Maiden Japan, a unit of Section23 Films, which has also released all OVAs other than Armor Hunter Mellowlink.

== Synopsis ==
In the Astragius Galaxy, the Gilgamesh and Balarant nations had until recently been locked in a century-old galactic war whose cause was long ago forgotten. Now, the war is ending and an uneasy truce has settled. The main weapon of the conflict is the common Armored Trooper, a mass-produced humanoid combat vehicle piloted by a single soldier. Both the Armored Troopers and their pilots are also known as VOTOMS (Vertical One-man Tank for Offense & Maneuvers). However, since Armored Troopers have extremely thin armor, and use a highly combustible liquid in their artificial muscle, their pilots have a very low chance of survival and are commonly referred to instead as "Bottoms", the lowest of the low ("Votoms" and "Bottoms" are written and pronounced the same way in Japanese).

The series follows the protagonist, Sergeant Major Chirico Cuvie, a special forces Armored Trooper pilot and former member of the Red Shoulder Battalion, an elite force used by the Gilgamesh Confederation in its war against the Balarant Union. Chirico is suddenly transferred to a unit engaged in a suspicious mission, unaware that he is aiding in the theft of secrets from what appears to be his side. Chirico is betrayed and left behind to die, but he survives, is arrested by the Gilgamesh military as a traitor, and is tortured for information on their homeworld. He escapes, triggering a pursuit extending across the entire series, with Chirico hunted by the army and criminals alike as he seeks the truth behind the operation. He is especially driven to discover the truth of one of the objects he was assigned to retrieve in that operation: a mysterious and beautiful woman who would become his sole clue to unraveling the galactic conspiracy.

== Development ==
Ryōsuke Takahashi conceived of VOTOMS after watching the film Junior Bonner, in which the main character travels across towns performing rodeo shows, which gave Takahashi the idea of creating a story in a post-war setting, with mechs fighting each other for sport. Although several authors have noted similarities between Chirico and Steve McQueen, who played the main character in Junior Bonner, Takahashi stated that Chirico was not modeled after anyone in particular.

== Cast ==
- Hozumi Gōda as Chirico Cuvie
- Kazuko Yanaga as Fyana
- Kōsei Tomita as Bouleuse Gotho
- Yōko Kawanami as Coconna
- Shigeru Chiba as Vanilla Vartla
- Issei Masamune as Ru Shako
- Kyonosuke Kami as Ypsilon
- Yūsaku Yara as Maj. Gimual Iskui
- Kenichi Ogata as Maj. Serge Borough, Albert Killy
- Akio Nojima as Aaron Schmittel
- Issei Futamata as Gurran Schmittel
- Shunji Yamada as 2nd Lt. Kudal Conin
- Banjō Ginga as Cap. Jean-Paul Rochina

== Sequels and spinoffs ==
=== The Last Red Shoulder ~ The "Unknown" Red Shoulder ===
Armored Trooper Votoms: The Last Red Shoulder (装甲騎兵ボトムズ ザ・ラストレッドショルダー, Sōkō Kihei Botomuzu Za Rasuto Reddo Shorudā) is a one-shot 1985 50-minute OVA. Set between the Uoodo and Kummen arcs in the TV series, the OVA focuses on Chirico, who reunites with his former Red Shoulder squadmates.

=== Big Battle ~ Battle of the Heterogeneous Species ===
Armored Trooper VOTOMS: Big Battle (装甲騎兵ボトムズ ビッグバトル, Sōkō Kihei Botomuzu Biggu Batoru), is a 1986 60-minute OVA. Takes place near the end of the series. The storyline, set between the plot and the epilogue of the TV series' final episode, it features Chirico and his friends against one of Balarant's new ATs.

=== Red Shoulder Document – Roots of Ambition ===
Armored Trooper VOTOMS: Red Shoulder Document – Roots of Ambition (装甲騎兵ボトムズ レッドショルダードキュメント 野望のルーツ, Sōkō Kihei Botomuzu Reddo Shorudā Dokyumento Yabō no Rūtsu) is a 60-minute OVA released in 1988. The storyline serves as a prequel to the main series and The Last Red Shoulder. It details Chirico's time in the Red Shoulder elite military unit and his encounters with General Pailsen.

=== Armor Hunter Mellowlink ~ Leechers Army Merowlink ===
Armor Hunter Mellowlink (機甲猟兵メロウリンク, Kikō Ryōhei Merourinku) is a 1988 twelve episode anime science fiction action OVA series spinoff of the VOTOMS series. It takes place in the same universe (and time, and in some episodes, almost the same places) as VOTOMS, but the two stories are entirely independent of each other.

Mellowlink is the story of a soldier whose anti-armor infantry unit is sacrificed on the battlefield for reasons unknown. Although he was not meant to survive, the main character, Mellowlink Arity, manages to do so, only to be framed for a crime he did not commit. Mellowlink escapes his captors and begins hunting down his former commanding officers, both to avenge his dead platoon members and to find out the nature of the conspiracy that led to their deaths.

The series is available for download on Bandai Visual's official website and the Japanese DVD box set was released on December 6, 2006. The series was previously issued twice on LaserDisc, once as six individual volumes, and once as a three-disc box set along with the two soundtracks. It was released on Blu-ray as part of the Perfect Soldier Box on February 25, 2021.

=== Brilliantly Shining Heresy ~ The Defrost ===
Armored Trooper VOTOMS: Brilliantly Shining Heresy (装甲騎兵ボトムズ 赫奕たる異端, Sōkō Kihei Botomuzu Kakuyakutaruitan) is a 5-episode OVA series released in 1994. It is a sequel to the original TV series, set 32 years after.

=== Pailsen Files ===
Armored Trooper VOTOMS: Pailsen Files (装甲騎兵ボトムズ ペールゼン・ファイルズ, Sōkō Kihei Botomuzu Pēruzen Fairuzu) is a 12-episode OVA series that was released from October 26, 2007, to August 22, 2008. It was also released as a feature film on January 17, 2009. It is a prequel to the main series and a sequel to Roots of Ambition.

=== Phantom Arc ===
Armored Trooper VOTOMS: Phantom Arc (装甲騎兵ボトムズ 幻影篇, Sōkō Kihei Botomuzu Gen'ei-hen), is a 2010 six episode OVA series. It is a sequel to Shining Heresy. The OVA focuses on Chirico's friends from the TV series 32 years later.

=== Case; Irvine ===
Armored Trooper VOTOMS Case;Irvine (装甲騎兵ボトムズ Case;IRVINE) is a 2010 OVA shown as part of a preview screening in Japan. It focuses on Irvine Lester, a former Gilgamesh Confederation AT pilot who now competes in Battling as the masked fighter "The Dark."

=== Armored Trooperoid ~ Votoms Finder ===
Votoms Finder (ボトムズファインダー), an "alternate universe" 2010 OVA that centers around Aki Tesuno, a Bottoms guard for scrap salvagers and a pilot of a robotic mecha called an Altro (as opposed to VOTOMS's trademark Armored Trooper mecha).

=== Alone Again ===
Armored Trooper VOTOMS: Alone Again (装甲騎兵ボトムズ 孤影再び, Sōkō Kihei Botomuzu Koei Futatabi) is a 2011 50-minute OVA that is set between Brilliantly Shining Heresy and Phantom Arc. The OVA focuses on Chirico Cuvie and his reunion with his old friends.

=== Die Graue Hexe ===
In January 2026, Bandai Namco Filmworks announced a new anime project titled Armored Trooper VOTOMS: Die Graue Hexe (装甲騎兵ボトムズ 灰色の魔女, Sōkō Kihei Botomuzu Haiiro no Majo) (German for The Grey Witch) in commemoration of Sunrise's 50th anniversary and will be produced by Sunrise with production assistance by Production I.G, and will be part of a series of projects commemorating the studio's 50th anniversary to be released between 2026 and 2028. The director was announced to be Mamoru Oshii, and the music is composed by Kenji Kawai. It was later revealed to be a two-part film, with the first part is released on November 20, 2026, released by Bandai Namco Filmworks, and the second part is set to premiere in 2027. For the first part, the theme song is "Na mo naki Shjin no You ni" (名もなき詩人のように; lit. 'Like a Poet Without a Name') performed by Mika Nakashima.

== Games ==
=== Video games ===
VOTOMS has appeared in numerous video games since the series' original airing.

- X68000: Dead Ash
- PC8801: Black Unicorn
- PC-9801: Votoms: The Real Battle
- Super Famicom: Votoms – The Battling Road
- PlayStation: Blue Knight Berserga Story (also known as Blue Sabre Knights)
- PlayStation: Armored Trooper Votoms – Uoodo and Kummen
- PlayStation: Brave Saga (as a guest character)
- PlayStation: Armored Trooper Votoms Lightning Slash
- PlayStation: Armored Trooper Votoms Steel Force
- PlayStation: Brave Saga 2 (as a guest character)
- Dreamcast: Sunrise Eiyuutan (as a guest character)
- PlayStation 2: Sunrise Eiyuutan 2 (as a guest character)
- WonderSwan: Harobots (as a guest character)
- Game Boy Color: GB Harobots (as a guest character)
- Game Boy Color: Brave Saga Shinsou Astaria (as a guest character)
- PlayStation 2: Soukou Kihei Votoms / Armored Trooper Votoms
- PlayStation Portable: Super Robot Wars Z2: Hakai-Hen (as a guest character)
- PlayStation Portable: Super Robot Wars Z2: Saisei-Hen (as a guest character)
- PlayStation Portable: Super Robot Wars OE (as a guest character)
- PlayStation 3/PlayStation Vita: Super Robot Wars Z3: Jigoku-Hen (as a guest character)
- PlayStation 4/Nintendo Switch: Super Robot Wars T (as a guest character)
- PlayStation 4/Nintendo Switch/Personal computer: Super Robot Wars 30 (as a guest character)

For a limited time, the Armored Trooper Votoms – Uoodo and Kummen game included a Red Shoulder Custom model. Chirico also figures in the Sunrise Eiyuutan (Sunrise Heroes) game for the PlayStation 2.

=== Role-playing ===
VOTOMS was a direct inspiration for the Heavy Gear role-playing game. VOTOMS also has its own official role-playing game, Armored Trooper VOTOMS: The Roleplaying Game (1997), developed by R. Talsorian Games and using the Fuzion system.
