= List of mecha anime =

The following is a list of mecha anime, a genre of anime featuring giant robots.

music anime (music is integral part of the plot)

Year(s)	Name	Series	Type	Notes	Ref.
1963–66	Astro Boy	Astro Boy	TV series		
1963–66	Gigantor	Tetsujin 28-go	TV series		
1964	Mighty Atom: The Brave in Space	Astro Boy	Film	Compilation	
1966	Cyborg 009	Cyborg 009	Film		
1967	Cyborg 009: Monster Wars	Cyborg 009	Film		
1968	Cyborg 009	Cyborg 009	TV series		
1972–74	Science Ninja Team Gatchaman	—N/a	TV series		
1972–73	Astroganger	—N/a	TV series		
1972–74	Mazinger Z	Mazinger	TV series		
1973	Mazinger Z vs. Devilman	Mazinger	Film		
1973–74	Zero Tester		TV series		
1974–75	Getter Robo	Getter Robo	TV series		
1974	Mazinger Z vs. The Great General of Darkness	Mazinger	Film		
1974–75	Great Mazinger	Mazinger	TV series		
1975	Great Mazinger vs. Getter Robo	Getter Robo / Mazinger	Film		
1975–76	Brave Raideen	Raideen	TV series		
1975–76	Getter Robo G	Getter Robo	TV series		
1975	Tekkaman: The Space Knight	Tekkaman	TV series		
1975	Uchu Enban Daisenso	—N/a	Film		
1975	Great Mazinger vs. Getter Robo G: Kuchu Daigekitotsu	Getter Robo / Mazinger	Film		
1975–77	Grendizer	Mazinger	TV series		
1975–76	Steel Jeeg	Steel Jeeg	TV series		
1976	UFO Robot Grendizer vs. Great Mazinger	Mazinger	Film		
1976–77	Dino Mech Gaiking	Gaiking	TV series		
1976	Gowappa 5 Gōdam	—N/a	TV series		
1976–77	UFO Warrior Dai Apolon	—N/a	TV series		
1976–77	Chōdenji Robo Combattler V	—N/a	TV series		
1976–77	Groizer X	—N/a	TV series		
1976–77	Blocker Gundan 4 Machine Blaster	—N/a	TV series		
1976	Grendizer, Getter Robo G, Great Mazinger: Kessen! Daikaijuu	Getter Robo / Mazinger	Film		
1976–77	Magne Robo Gakeen	—N/a	TV series		
1977–79	Yatterman	Yatterman	TV series		
1977	Mechander Robo	—N/a	TV series		
1977–78	Wakusei Robo Danguard Ace	Danguard Ace	TV series		
1977	Chōgattai Majutsu Robo Ginguiser	—N/a	TV series		
1977–78	Voltes V	—N/a	TV series		
1977–78	Balatack	—N/a	TV series		
1977	Danguard Ace vs. Insect Robot Troop	Danguard Ace	Film		
1977–78	Dinosaur War Izenborg	—N/a	TV series		
1977–78	Invincible Super Man Zambot 3	—N/a	TV series		
1978	Danguard Ace: The Great Space War	Danguard Ace	Film	Compilation	
1978–79	Tōshō Daimos	—N/a	TV series		
1978–79	Invincible Steel Man Daitarn 3	—N/a	TV series		
1978–79	Uchū Majin Daikengo	—N/a	TV series		
1979–80	Cyborg 009	Cyborg 009	TV series		
1979–80	Future Robot Daltanious	—N/a	TV series		
1979–80	Mobile Suit Gundam	Gundam	TV series		
1979–81	Gordian Warrior	—N/a	TV series		
1980–81	Invincible Robo Trider G7	—N/a	TV series		
1980–81	Space Emperor God Sigma	—N/a	TV series		
1980–81	Space Runaway Ideon	Space Runaway Ideon	TV series		
1980–81	Space Warrior Baldios	Space Warrior Baldios	TV series		
1980–81	Astro Boy	Astro Boy	TV series		
1980–81	The New Adventures of Gigantor	Tetsujin 28-go	TV series		
1980	Cyborg 009: Legend of the Super Galaxy	Cyborg 009	Film		
1981–82	Saikyō Robo Daiōja	—N/a	TV series		
1981–82	Golden Warrior Gold Lightan	—N/a	TV series		
1981–82	Beast King GoLion	—N/a	TV series		
1981	Mobile Suit Gundam I	Gundam	Film	Compilation	
1981	GoShogun	GoShogun	TV series		
1981	Mobile Suit Gundam II: Soldiers of Sorrow	Gundam	Film	Compilation	
1981–82	God Mars	Mars	TV series		
1981–82	Galaxy Cyclone Braiger	J9 Series	TV series		
1981–83	Fang of the Sun Dougram	Dougram	TV series		
1981	Space Warrior Baldios	Space Warrior Baldios	Film		
1982–83	Combat Mecha Xabungle	Xabungle	TV series		
1982–83	Armored Fleet Dairugger XV	—N/a	TV series		
1982	Mobile Suit Gundam III: Encounters in Space	Gundam	Film	Compilation	
1982	GoShogun	GoShogun	Film	Compilation	
1982	Acrobunch	—N/a	TV series		
1982–83	Galactic Gale Baxingar	J9 Series	TV series		
1982	The Ideon: A Contact	Space Runaway Ideon	Film	Compilation	
1982	The Ideon: Be Invoked	Space Runaway Ideon	Film		
1982	Techno Police 21C	—N/a	Film		
1982–83	Once Upon a Time... Space	—N/a	TV series		
1982–83	Super Dimension Fortress Macross	Macross	TV series		
1982–83	Warrior of Love Rainbowman	—N/a	TV series		
1982	God Mars: The Movie	Mars	Film	Compilation	
1983–84	Akū Daisakusen Srungle	—N/a	TV series		
1983–84	Aura Battler Dunbine	Byston Well	TV series		
1983–84	Lightspeed Electroid Albegas	—N/a	TV series		
1983–84	Armored Trooper Votoms	Votoms	TV series		
1983–84	Galactic Whirlwind Sasuraiger	J9 Series	TV series		
1983–84	Super Dimension Century Orguss	Orguss	TV series		
1983	Psycho Armor Govarian	—N/a	TV series		
1983	Xabungle Graffiti	Xabungle	Film	Compilation	
1983	Dougram: Documentary of the Fang of the Sun	Dougram	Film	Compilation	
1983	Choro-Q Dougram	Dougram	Film		
1983–84	Genesis Climber MOSPEADA	—N/a	TV series		
1983–84	Special Armored Battalion Dorvack	—N/a	TV series		
1983–84	Ginga Hyōryū Vifam (Galactic Drifter Vifam, Round Vernian Vifam)	Ginga Hyōryū Vifam	TV series		
1984	Chō Kōsoku Galvion	—N/a	TV series		
1984–85	Heavy Metal L-Gaim	Heavy Metal L-Gaim	TV series		
1984–85	Video Warrior Laserion	—N/a	TV series		
1984	Giant Gorg	—N/a	TV series		
1984	God Mazinger	Mazinger	TV series		
1984	Super Dimension Cavalry Southern Cross	—N/a	TV series		
1984	Macross: Do You Remember Love?	Macross	Film		
1984	Mighty Orbots	—N/a	TV series		
1984–85	Voltron	—N/a	TV series		
1984–85	Choriki Robo Galatt	—N/a	TV series		
1984–85	Panzer World Galient	Panzer World Galient	TV series		
1984–85	Bismark	—N/a	TV series		
1984	Ginga Hyōryū Vifam: Kachua Kara no Tayori	Ginga Hyōryū Vifam	OVA film	Compilation	
1984	Ginga Hyōryū Vifam: Atsumatta 13-nin	Ginga Hyōryū Vifam	OVA film	Compilation	
1985	Ginga Hyōryū Vifam: Kieta 12-nin	Ginga Hyōryū Vifam	OVA film		
1985–86	Mobile Suit Zeta Gundam	Gundam	TV series		
1985	Robotech	Robotech	TV series		
1985	Megazone 23	Megazone 23	OVA film		
1985	Dancouga – Super Beast Machine God	Dancouga	TV series		
1985	Armored Trooper Votoms: The Last Red Shoulder	Votoms	OVA film		
1985	Ginga Hyōryū Vifam: "Kate no Kioku" Namida no Dakkai Sakusen!!	Ginga Hyōryū Vifam	OVA film		
1985–86	Blue Comet SPT Layzner	Blue Comet SPT Layzner	TV series		
1985–86	Ninja Senshi Tobikage (Ninja Robots)	—N/a	TV series		
1985–87	Fight! Iczer One	—N/a	OVA series		
1986	Panzer World Galient: Chapter of the Land / Chapter of the Sky	Panzer World Galient	OVA series	Compilation	
1986–87	Mobile Suit Gundam ZZ	Gundam	TV series		
1986	Transformers: Scramble City	Transformers	OVA film		
1986	Dancouga: Requiem for Victims	Dancouga	OVA film		
1986	M.D. Geist	—N/a	OVA film		
1986	Megazone 23 Part II	Megazone 23	OVA film		
1986	Project A-ko	Project A-ko	Film		
1986–87	Machine Robo: Revenge of Cronos	Machine Robo	TV series		
1986	Armored Trooper Votoms: The Big Battle	Votoms	OVA film		
1986	Robotech: The Movie	Robotech	Film		
1986	Gall Force: Eternal Story	Gall Force	Film		
1986	Panzer World Galient: Crest of Iron	Panzer World Galient	OVA film		
1986	Blue Comet SPT Layzner	Blue Comet SPT Layzner	OVA series		
1986–87	Heavy Metal L-Gaim	Heavy Metal L-Gaim	OVA series		
1986	Delpower X Bakuhatsu Miracle Genki!	—N/a	OVA film		
1987–88	Metal Armor Dragonar	—N/a	TV series		
1987–91	Bubblegum Crisis	Bubblegum Crisis	OVA series		
1987	God Bless Dancouga	Dancouga	OVA film		
1987	Project A-ko 2: Plot of the Daitokuji Financial Group	Project A-ko	OVA film		
1987	Machine Robo: Battle Hackers	Machine Robo	TV series		
1987	Super Dimension Fortress Macross: Flash Back 2012	Macross	OVA film		
1987	Black Magic M-66	—N/a	OVA film		
1987–88	Transformers: The Headmasters	Transformers	TV series		
1987	Robot Carnival	—N/a	OVA film		
1987	Dead Heat	—N/a	OVA film		
1987–88	Saber Rider and the Star Sheriffs	—N/a	TV series		
1987–89	Dangaioh	Dangaioh	OVA series		
1987	Gall Force 2: Destruction	Gall Force	OVA film		
1987	Relic Armor Legaciam	—N/a	OVA film		
1987	Ladius	—N/a	OVA film		
1987	Daimajū Gekitō: Hagane no Oni	—N/a	OVA film		
1987	Good Morning Althea	—N/a	OVA film		
1987	Metal Skin Panic MADOX-01	—N/a	OVA film		
1987	O-parts: Oman	—N/a	OVA film		
1988	Aura Battler Dunbine: The Tale of Neo Byston Well	Byston Well	OVA series		
1988	Dragon's Heaven	—N/a	OVA film		
1988	Mobile Suit Gundam: Char's Counterattack	Gundam	Film		
1988	Armored Trooper Votoms: The Red Shoulder Document – Origin of Ambition	Votoms	OVA film		
1988–89	Transformers: Super-God Masterforce	Transformers	TV series		
1988–89	Mashin Hero Wataru	Mashin Hero Wataru	TV series		
1988	Appleseed	Appleseed	OVA film		
1988–89	Patlabor (Mobile Police Patlabor)	Patlabor	OVA series		
1988–94	Dominion Tank Police	—N/a	OVA series		
1988	God Mars: The Untold Legend	Mars	OVA film		
1988	Project A-ko 3: Cinderella Rhapsody	Project A-ko	OVA film		
1988	Robotech II: The Sentinels	Robotech	OVA film		
1988–89	Gunbuster	Gunbuster	OVA series		
1988	Starship Troopers	—N/a	OVA series		
1988	Gall Force 3: Stardust War	Gall Force	OVA film		
1988–89	Armor Hunter Mellowlink	Votoms	OVA series		
1988–90	Hades Project Zeorymer	—N/a	OVA series		
1989	The Five Star Stories	—N/a	Film		
1989–90	Jushin Liger	—N/a	TV series		
1989	Transformers: Victory	Transformers	TV series		
1989	Mobile Suit Gundam 0080: War in the Pocket	Gundam	OVA series		
1989–90	Madö King Granzört	Madö King Granzört	TV series		
1989	Patlabor: The Movie	Patlabor	Film		
1989	Ariel Visual	Ariel	OVA series		
1989	Shin Mashin Eiyūden Wataru: Mashinzan-hen	Mashin Hero Wataru	OVA series		
1989	Megazone 23 Part III	Megazone 23	OVA series		
1989	Project A-ko 4: Final	Project A-ko	OVA film		
1989–90	Patlabor: The TV Series	Patlabor	TV series		
1989–90	Dancouga: Blazing Epilogue	Dancouga	OVA series		
1990–91	Brave Exkaiser	Brave series	TV series		
1990–91	Mashin Hero Wataru 2	Mashin Hero Wataru	TV series		
1990–91	Sol Bianca	—N/a	OVA series		
1990–91	NG Knight Ramune & 40	NG Knight Ramune & 40	TV series		
1990	Transformers: Zone	Transformers	OVA film		
1990	Madö King Granzört: The Last Magical War	Madö King Granzört	OVA series		
1990–91	Musashi, the Samurai Lord	—N/a	TV series		
1990–92	Patlabor: The New Files	Patlabor	OVA series		
1991	Ariel Deluxe	Ariel	OVA series		
1991–92	The Brave of Sun Fighbird	Brave series	TV series		
1991–92	Getter Robo Go	Getter Robo	TV series		
1991	Mobile Suit Gundam F91	Gundam	Film		
1991–92	Matchless Raijin-Oh	Eldran series	TV series		
1991	Armored Police Metal Jack	—N/a	TV series		
1991–92	Mobile Suit Gundam 0083: Stardust Memory	Gundam	OVA series		
1991	Bubblegum Crash	Bubblegum Crisis	OVA series		
1991	NG Knight Lamune & 40 EX	NG Knight Ramune & 40	OVA series		
1991–92	Detonator Orgun	—N/a	OVA series		
1991	Roujin Z	—N/a	Film		
1992–93	The Brave Fighter of Legend Da-Garn	Brave series	TV series		
1992–93	Tekkaman Blade	Tekkaman	TV series		
1992	Babel II	—N/a	OVA series		
1992	Madö King Granzört: An Adventure Story	Madö King Granzört	OVA series		
1992–93	Genki Bakuhatsu Ganbaruger	Eldran series	TV series		
1992–93	Tetsujin 28-go FX	Tetsujin 28-go	TV series		
1992–93	Genesis Survivor Gaiarth	—N/a	OVA series		
1992–93	K.O. Beast	—N/a	OVA series		
1992	Super Dimensional Fortress Macross II: Lovers Again	Macross	OVA series		
1992–98	Giant Robo: The Day the Earth Stood Still	Giant Robo	OVA series		
1992	Mobile Suit Gundam 0083: The Afterglow of Zeon	Gundam	Film	Compilation	
1992–93	Matchless Raijin-Oh	Eldran series	OVA series		
1992–93	D-1 Devastator	—N/a	OVA series		
1993–94	The Brave Express Might Gaine	Brave series	TV series		
1993	Moldiver	—N/a	OVA series		
1993–94	Nekketsu Saikyō Go-Saurer	Eldran series	TV series		
1993–94	Kishin Corps	—N/a	OVA series		
1993–94	Mobile Suit Victory Gundam	Gundam	TV series		
1993–94	Shippū! Iron Leaguer	Iron Leaguer	TV series		
1993	Patlabor 2: The Movie	Patlabor	Film		
1993–94	Ryūseiki Gakusaver	—N/a	OVA series		
1993–94	Mashin Eiyuden Wataru: Warinaki Toki no Monogatari	Mashin Hero Wataru	OVA series		
1993–95	Orguss 02	Orguss	OVA series		
1994–95	The Brave Police J-Decker	Brave series	TV series		
1994	Armored Trooper Votoms: Brilliantly Shining Heresy	Votoms	OVA series		
1994–95	Haō Taikei Ryū Knight	Haō Taikei Ryū Knight	TV series		
1994–95	Red Baron	—N/a	TV series		
1994	Yamato Takeru	Yamato Takeru	TV series		
1994–95	Mobile Fighter G Gundam	Gundam	TV series		
1994	Mars	Mars	OVA series		
1994–95	Haō Taikei Ryū Knight: Adeu's Legend	Haō Taikei Ryū Knight	OVA series		
1994–95	Tekkaman Blade II	Tekkaman	OVA series		
1994–95	Macross Plus	Macross	OVA series		
1994–95	Macross 7	Macross	TV series		
1994–95	Magic Knight Rayearth	Magic Knight Rayearth	TV series		
1994–95	Shippū! Iron Leaguer: Silver no Hata no Moto ni	Iron Leaguer	OVA series		
1995	Gulliver Boy	—N/a	TV series		
1995–96	The Brave of Gold Goldran	Brave series	TV series		
1995	Armitage III	—N/a	OVA series		
1995–96	Mobile Suit Gundam Wing	Gundam	TV series		
1995	Sailor Victory	—N/a	OVA series		
1995	Battle Skipper	—N/a	OVA series		
1995	Galaxy Fräulein Yuna	Galaxy Fräulein Yuna	OVA series		
1995–96	Neon Genesis Evangelion	Neon Genesis Evangelion	TV series		
1995	Macross 7 the Movie: The Galaxy's Calling Me!	Macross	Film		
1995	Macross Plus: Movie Edition	Macross	Film	Compilation	
1995	Ghost in the Shell	Ghost in the Shell	Film		
1995	Yamato Takeru: After War	Yamato Takeru	OVA series		
1995–96	Haō Taikei Ryū Knight: Adeu's Legend II	Haō Taikei Ryū Knight	OVA series		
1995–96	Macross 7: Encore	Macross	OVA series		
1996–99	Mobile Suit Gundam: The 08th MS Team	Gundam	OVA series		
1996–97	Brave Command Dagwon	Brave series	TV series		
1996–98	Power Dolls	—N/a	OVA series		
1996	The Vision of Escaflowne	Escaflowne	TV series		
1996	VS Knight Ramune & 40 Fire	NG Knight Ramune & 40	TV series		
1996	After War Gundam X	Gundam	TV series		
1996	Mobile Suit Gundam Wing: Operation Meteor	Gundam	OVA series	Compilation	
1996	Maze	Maze	OVA series		
1996–97	Martian Successor Nadesico	Martian Successor Nadesico	TV series		
1996–97	Raideen the Superior	Raideen	TV series		
1996–97	Galaxy Fräulein Yuna Returns	Galaxy Fräulein Yuna	OVA series		
1997	Gundam Wing: Endless Waltz	Gundam	OVA series		
1997–98	The King of Braves GaoGaiGar	Brave series	TV series		
1997	Neon Genesis Evangelion: Death & Rebirth	Neon Genesis Evangelion	Film	Compilation	
1997	Maze	Maze	TV series		
1997	Knights of Ramune	NG Knight Ramune & 40	OVA series		
1997	The End of Evangelion	Neon Genesis Evangelion	Film		
1997	Rayearth	Magic Knight Rayearth	OVA series		
1997	Ehrgeiz	—N/a	TV series		
1997–98	Cho Mashin Hero Wataru	Mashin Hero Wataru	TV series		
1997	Virus Buster Serge	—N/a	TV series		
1997	Brave Command Dagwon: The Boy with Crystal Eyes	Brave series	OVA series		
1997–98	Macross Dynamite 7	Macross	OVA series		
1997–98	Sakura Wars: The Gorgeous Blooming Cherry Blossoms	Sakura Wars	OVA series		
1998	Gekiganger III	Martian Successor Nadesico	OVA film		
1998	Ginga Hyōryū Vifam 13	Ginga Hyōryū Vifam	TV series		
1998–99	Beast Wars II: Super Life-Form Transformers	Transformers	TV series		
1998–99	Neo Ranga	—N/a	TV series		
1998	Brain Powerd	—N/a	TV series		
1998	Maze Bakunetsu Jikuu: Tenpen Kyoui no Giant	Maze	Film		
1998	Super Mobile Legend Dinagiga	—N/a	OVA series		
1998	Gundam Wing: Endless Waltz -Special Edition-	Gundam	Film	Compilation	
1998	Mobile Suit Gundam: The 08th MS Team – Miller's Report	Gundam	Film	Compilation	
1998	Martian Successor Nadesico: The Motion Picture – Prince of Darkness	Martian Successor Nadesico	Film		
1998–99	Getter Robo Armageddon	Getter Robo	OVA series		
1998–99	Gasaraki	—N/a	TV series		
1998–99	Steam Detectives	—N/a	TV series		
1998–99	Bubblegum Crisis Tokyo 2040	Bubblegum Crisis	TV series		
1998	Beast Wars II: Lio Convoy's Close Call!	Transformers	Film		
1999	Super Life-Form Transformers: Beast Wars Neo	Transformers	TV series		
1999	Z-Mind	—N/a	OVA series		
1999	Gundress	—N/a	Film		
1999	Betterman	Brave series	TV series		
1999	Dual! Parallel Trouble Adventure	Tenchi Muyo!	TV series		
1999–00	Turn A Gundam	Gundam	TV series		
1999	Cybuster	Super Robot Wars	TV series		
1999–00	Zoids: Chaotic Century	Zoids	TV series		
1999–01	Dangaizer 3	—N/a	OVA series		
1999–00	Dai-Guard	—N/a	TV series		
1999–00	Infinite Ryvius	—N/a	TV series		
1999–00	Blue Gender	Blue Gender	TV series		
1999–00; 2003	The Big O	—N/a	TV series		
1999–00	Sakura Wars: The Radiant Gorgeous Blooming Cherry Blossoms	Sakura Wars	OVA series		
2000	Pilot Candidate	—N/a	TV series		
2000–03	The King of Braves GaoGaiGar Final	Brave series	OVA series		
2000	Gate Keepers	—N/a	TV series		
2000	Platinumhugen Ordian	—N/a	TV series		
2000	Transformers: Robots in Disguise	Transformers	TV series		
2000	Sakura Wars	Sakura Wars	TV series		
2000	Escaflowne	Escaflowne	Film		
2000	Vandread	—N/a	TV series		
2000–01	Gear Fighter Dendoh	—N/a	TV series		
2000–01	Argento Soma	—N/a	TV series		
2000–01	Invincible King Tri-Zenon	—N/a	TV series		
2000–01	Hiwou War Chronicles	—N/a	TV series		
2000–01	De:vadasy	—N/a	OVA series		
2000–01	Shin Getter Robo vs Neo Getter Robo	Getter Robo	OVA series		
2001	Zoids: New Century	Zoids	TV series		
2001	Zone of the Enders: 2167 Idolo	Zone of the Enders	OVA film		
2001	Run=Dim	—N/a	TV series		
2001	Geneshaft	—N/a	TV series		
2001	Great Dangaioh	Dangaioh	TV series		
2001–02	Dennō Bōkenki Webdiver	—N/a	TV series		
2001	Z.O.E. Dolores, I	Zone of the Enders	TV series		
2001–07	Gundam Evolve	Gundam	OVA series		
2001–02	Mazinkaiser	Mazinger	OVA series		
2001	Zaion: I Wish You Were Here	—N/a	ONA series		
2001–02	Cyborg 009: The Cyborg Soldier	Cyborg 009	TV series		
2001	Kanzen Shouri Daiteioh	Eldran series	OVA film		
2001	Sakura Wars: The Movie	Sakura Wars	Film		
2002	Full Metal Panic!	Full Metal Panic!	TV series		
2002	RahXephon	RahXephon	TV series		
2002	Voices of a Distant Star	—N/a	OVA film		
2002	Turn A Gundam I: Earth Light	Gundam	Film	Compilation	
2002	Turn A Gundam II: Moonlight Butterfly	Gundam	Film	Compilation	
2002–03	MegaMan NT Warrior (Rockman EXE)	Mega Man	TV series		
2002	WXIII: Patlabor the Movie 3	Patlabor	Film		
2002	Daigunder	—N/a	TV series		
2002–03	Transformers: Armada	Transformers	TV series		
2002–03	Overman King Gainer	—N/a	TV series		
2002	Mega Man: Upon a Star	Mega Man	OVA series		
2002–05	Ghost in the Shell: Stand Alone Complex	Ghost in the Shell	TV series		
2002–03	Mobile Suit Gundam SEED	Gundam	TV series		
2002	Gravion	—N/a	TV series		
2002–03	Shinseikiden Mars	Mars	TV series		
2002–03	Kikou Sennyo Rouran	—N/a	TV series		
2002	Blue Gender: The Warrior	Blue Gender	Film	Compilation	
2002–04	Macross Zero	Macross	OVA series		
2003	Lime-iro Senkitan	—N/a	TV series		
2003–04	Machine Robo Rescue	Machine Robo	TV series		
2003	Gunparade March: The New March	Gunparade March	TV series		
2003	Stellvia	—N/a	TV series		
2003–04	Astro Boy	Astro Boy	TV series		
2003	Firestorm	—N/a	TV series		
2003	Gad Guard	—N/a	TV series		
2003	RahXephon: Pluralitas Concentio	RahXephon	Film	Compilation	
2003	Mazinkaiser vs. Great General of Darkness	Mazinger	OVA film		
2003–04	Superior Defender Gundam Force	Gundam	TV series		
2003	Immortal Grand Prix (microseries)	Immortal Grand Prix	TV series		
2003–04	Godannar (Marriage of God & Soul Godannar!!)	—N/a	TV series		
2003–05	Zoids: Fuzors	Zoids	TV series		
2004	Transformers: Energon	Transformers	TV series		
2004	Ghost in the Shell 2: Innocence	Ghost in the Shell	Film		
2004	Mars Daybreak	—N/a	TV series		
2004–05	AM Driver	—N/a	TV series		
2004	Burst Angel	—N/a	TV series		
2004	Tetsujin 28-go	Tetsujin 28-go	TV series		
2004	New Getter Robo	Getter Robo	OVA series		
2004	Panda-Z	—N/a	TV series		
2004	Appleseed	Appleseed	Film		
2004	Tristia of the Deep-Blue Sea	—N/a	OVA series		
2004	Kishin Houkou Demonbane	Demonbane	OVA film		
2004	Fafner in the Azure: Dead Aggressor	Fafner in the Azure	TV series		
2004	Mobile Suit Gundam MS IGLOO: The Hidden One Year War	Gundam	OVA series		
2004	Mobile Suit Gundam SEED: Special Edition	Gundam	TV special	Compilation	
2004	Kannazuki no Miko	—N/a	TV series		
2004–05	Mobile Suit Gundam SEED Destiny	Gundam	TV series		
2004–06	Diebuster	Gunbuster	OVA series		
2004-06	Super Robot Monkey Team Hyperforce Go!	—N/a	TV series		
2005	Jinki: Extend	—N/a	TV series		
2005	Transformers: Cybertron	Transformers	TV series		
2005	Genesis of Aquarion	Aquarion	TV series		
2005–06	Zoids: Genesis	Zoids	TV series		
2005	The King of Braves GaoGaiGar Final Grand Glorious Gathering	Brave series	TV series	Compilation	
2005–06	Eureka Seven	Eureka Seven	TV series		
2005	Super Robot Wars Original Generation: The Animation	Super Robot Wars	OVA series		
2005	Mobile Suit Zeta Gundam: A New Translation – Heir to the Stars	Gundam	Film	Compilation	
2005–06	Kirameki Project	—N/a	OVA series		
2005	Gun X Sword	—N/a	TV series		
2005	Full Metal Panic! The Second Raid	Full Metal Panic!	TV series		
2005–06	Guyver: The Bioboosted Armor	—N/a	TV series		
2005–06	Gunparade Orchestra	Gunparade March	TV series		
2005–06	Immortal Grand Prix	Immortal Grand Prix	TV series		
2005	Negadon: The Monster from Mars	—N/a	Film		
2005	Mobile Suit Zeta Gundam: A New Translation II – Lovers	Gundam	Film	Compilation	
2005–06	Gaiking: Legend of Daiku-Maryu	Gaiking	TV series		
2005–06	The Wings of Rean	Byston Well	ONA series		
2005	Fafner in the Azure: Right of Left	Fafner in the Azure	TV special		
2006	Mobile Suit Zeta Gundam: A New Translation III – Love is the Pulse of the Stars	Gundam	Film	Compilation	
2006	Zegapain	Zegapain	TV series		
2006	Mobile Suit Gundam MS IGLOO: Apocalypse 0079	Gundam	OVA series		
2006–07	Mobile Suit Gundam SEED Destiny: Special Edition	Gundam	TV special	Compilation	
2006	Kishin Houkou Demonbane	Demonbane	TV series		
2006–07	Flag	—N/a	ONA series		
2006	Mobile Suit Gundam SEED C.E. 73: Stargazer	Gundam	ONA series		
2006	Innocent Venus	—N/a	TV series		
2006	Ghost in the Shell: Stand Alone Complex – Solid State Society	Ghost in the Shell	Film		
2006	Gunbuster vs. Diebuster	Gunbuster	Film	Compilation	
2006–07	Super Robot Wars Original Generation: Divine Wars	Super Robot Wars	TV series		
2006	Gin'iro no Olynssis	—N/a	TV series		
2006–07	Code Geass: Lelouch of the Rebellion	Code Geass	TV series		
2006–07	Mega Man Star Force	Mega Man	TV series		
2006–07	Strain: Strategic Armored Infantry	—N/a	TV series		
2006–07	BALDR FORCE EXE Resolution	—N/a	OVA series		
2007	GR: Giant Robo	Giant Robo	TV series		
2007	Dancouga Nova – Super God Beast Armor	Dancouga	TV series		
2007	Reideen	Raideen	TV series		
2007	Tetsujin 28-go: Morning Moon of Midday	Tetsujin 28-go	Film		
2007	Gurren Lagann	Gurren Lagann	TV series		
2007	Heroic Age	—N/a	TV series		
2007	Idolmaster: Xenoglossia	—N/a	TV series		
2007	Engage Planet Kiss Dum	—N/a	TV series		
2007	Gigantic Formula	—N/a	TV series		
2007	Kotetsushin Jeeg	Steel Jeeg	TV series		
2007	Bokurano	—N/a	TV series		
2007	Genesis of Aquarion	Aquarion	OVA series		
2007	Sky Girls	—N/a	TV series		
2007	Evangelion: 1.0 You Are (Not) Alone	Neon Genesis Evangelion	Film		
2007	Genesis of Aquarion: Wings of Genesis	Aquarion	Film	Compilation	
2007–09	Mobile Suit Gundam 00	Gundam	TV series		
2007	Appleseed Ex Machina	Appleseed	Film		
2007–08	Armored Trooper Votoms: Pailsen Files	Votoms	OVA series		
2008–09	Yatterman	Yatterman	TV series		
2008	Macross Frontier	Macross	TV series		
2008	Code Geass: Lelouch of the Rebellion R2	Code Geass	TV series		
2008	Xam'd: Lost Memories	Xam'd: Lost Memories	TV series		
2008	Gurren Lagann the Movie: Childhood's End	Gurren Lagann	Film	Compilation	
2008–09	Linebarrels of Iron	—N/a	TV series		
2008–09	Mobile Suit Gundam MS IGLOO 2: Gravity Front	Gundam	OVA series		
2009	The Girl Who Leapt Through Space	—N/a	TV series		
2009	Viper's Creed	—N/a	TV series		
2009	Rideback	—N/a	TV series		
2009	Armored Trooper Votoms: Pailsen Files Movie	Votoms	Film	Compilation	
2009–10	Tenchi Muyo! War on Geminar	Tenchi Muyo!	OVA series		
2009	Asura Cryin'	—N/a	TV series		
2009	Basquash!	—N/a	TV series		
2009	Mazinger Edition Z: The Impact!	Mazinger	TV series		
2009	Eureka Seven: Good Night, Sleep Tight, Young Lovers	Eureka Seven	Film		
2009	Gurren Lagann the Movie: The Lights in the Sky are Stars	Gurren Lagann	Film	Compilation	
2009	Evangelion: 2.0 You Can (Not) Advance	Neon Genesis Evangelion	Film		
2009–10	Mobile Suit Gundam 00: Special Edition	Gundam	OVA series	Compilation	
2009	Macross Frontier the Movie: The False Songstress	Macross	Film		
2010–14	Mobile Suit Gundam Unicorn	Gundam	OVA series		
2010	Armored Trooper Votoms: Phantom Arc	Votoms	OVA series		
2010	Heroman	—N/a	TV series		
2010–11	SD Gundam Sangokuden Brave Battle Warriors	Gundam	TV series		
2010	Planzet	—N/a	Film		
2010	Broken Blade: The Time of Awakening	Broken Blade	Film		
2010	Broken Blade 2: The Path of Separation	Broken Blade	Film		
2010	Model Suit Gunpla Builders Beginning G	Gundam	OVA series		
2010	Mobile Suit Gundam 00 the Movie: A Wakening of the Trailblazer	Gundam	Film		
2010	Broken Blade 3: Scars from an Assassin's Blade	Broken Blade	Film		
2010–11	Super Robot Wars Original Generation: The Inspector	Super Robot Wars	TV series		
2010–11	Star Driver	Star Driver	TV series		
2010	Broken Blade 4: The Land of Calamity	Broken Blade	Film		
2010	Armored Trooper Votoms: Case; Irvine	Votoms	OVA film		
2010–11	Mazinkaizer SKL	Mazinger	OVA series		
2010	Votoms Finder	Votoms	OVA film		
2010	Fafner in the Azure: Heaven and Earth	Fafner in the Azure	Film		
2011	Infinite Stratos	—N/a	TV series		
2011	Armored Trooper Votoms: Alone Again	Votoms	OVA film		
2011	Broken Blade 5: The Gap Between Life and Death	Broken Blade	Film		
2011	Macross Frontier the Movie: The Wings of Farewell	Macross	Film		
2011–12	Little Battlers Experience (LBX)	—N/a	TV series		
2011	Broken Blade 6: Fortress of Lamentation	Broken Blade	Film		
2011–12	Appleseed XIII	Appleseed	OVA series		
2011	Appleseed XIII: Tartaros	Appleseed	Film	Compilation	
2011–12	Mobile Suit Gundam AGE	Gundam	TV series		
2011–12	Guilty Crown	—N/a	TV series		
2011	Appleseed XIII: Ouranos	Appleseed	Film	Compilation	
2011	Gattai Robot Atranger	—N/a	OVA film		
2011	Justeen	—N/a	OVA film		
2012	Symphogear	Symphogear	TV series		
2012	Lagrange: The Flower of Rin-ne	—N/a	TV series		
2012	Aquarion Evol	Aquarion	TV series		
2012	Eureka Seven: AO	Eureka Seven	TV series		
2012	Muv-Luv Alternative: Total Eclipse	Muv-Luv	TV series		
2012–16	Code Geass: Akito the Exiled	Code Geass	OVA series		
2012–13	Chōsoku Henkei Gyrozetter	—N/a	TV series		
2012–13	Robotics;Notes	—N/a	TV series		
2012	Macross FB 7: Ore no Uta o Kike!	Macross	Film		
2012	009 Re:Cyborg	Cyborg 009	Film		
2012	Evangelion: 3.0 You Can (Not) Redo	Neon Genesis Evangelion	Film		
2013	Star Driver: The Movie	Star Driver	Film	Compilation	
2013	Majestic Prince	Majestic Prince	TV series		
2013	Bakujū Gasshin Ziguru Hazeru	—N/a	TV series		
2013–16	Tetsujin 28-go Gao!	Tetsujin 28-go	TV series		
2013	Gargantia on the Verdurous Planet	Gargantia on the Verdurous Planet	TV series		
2013	Valvrave the Liberator	—N/a	TV series		
2013–15	Ghost in the Shell: Arise	Ghost in the Shell	OVA series		
2013–14	Transformers Go!	Transformers	OVA series		
2013	Symphogear G	Symphogear	TV series		
2013	Robotech: Love Live Alive	Robotech	OVA film		
2013	Mobile Suit Gundam AGE: Memory of Eden	Gundam	OVA series	Compilation	
2013–14	Tenkai Knights	—N/a	TV series		
2013–14	Gundam Build Fighters	Gundam	TV series		
2013–14	Chou Zenmairobo: Patrasche	—N/a	TV series		
2014	Buddy Complex	Buddy Complex	TV series		
2014	Nobunaga the Fool	—N/a	TV series		
2014	Captain Earth	—N/a	TV series		
2014	Daimidaler: Prince vs Penguin Empire	—N/a	TV series		
2014	Broken Blade	Broken Blade	TV series	Compilation	
2014	Dai-Shogun – Great Revolution	—N/a	TV series		
2014–15	Knights of Sidonia	Knights of Sidonia	TV series		
2014	M3: The Dark Metal	—N/a	TV series		
2014	Argevollen	—N/a	TV series		
2014–15	Aldnoah.Zero	—N/a	TV series		
2014	Appleseed Alpha	Appleseed	Film		
2014–15	Gargantia on the Verdurous Planet: Far Beyond the Voyage	Gargantia on the Verdurous Planet	OVA series		
2014	Buddy Complex: Into the Skies of Tomorrow	Buddy Complex	TV special		
2014–15	Gundam Reconguista in G	Gundam	TV series		
2014–15	Cross Ange	—N/a	TV series		
2014–15	Gundam Build Fighters Try	Gundam	TV series		
2014	Expelled from Paradise	—N/a	Film		
2015	Doamayger-D	—N/a	TV series		
2015	Q Transformers: Return of the Mystery of Convoy	Transformers	TV series		
2015	Fafner in the Azure: Exodus	Fafner in the Azure	TV series		
2015–18	Mobile Suit Gundam: The Origin	Gundam	OVA series		
2015	Knights of Sidonia	Knights of Sidonia	Film	Compilation	
2015	Ghost in the Shell: Arise – Alternative Architecture	Ghost in the Shell	TV series	Compilation	
2015	Ghost in the Shell: The New Movie	Ghost in the Shell	Film		
2015	Aquarion Love	Aquarion	OVA film		
2015	Aquarion Logos	Aquarion	TV series		
2015	Symphogear GX	Symphogear	TV series		
2015	Q Transformers: Saranaru Ninkimono e no Michi	Transformers	TV series		
2015	Comet Lucifer	—N/a	TV series		
2015–17	Mobile Suit Gundam: Iron-Blooded Orphans	Gundam	TV series		
2015–17	Mobile Suit Gundam Thunderbolt	Gundam	ONA series		
2016	Active Raid	—N/a	TV series		
2016	BBK/BRNK	—N/a	TV series		
2016	Schwarzesmarken	Muv-Luv	TV series		
2016	Undefeated Bahamut Chronicle	—N/a	TV series		
2016	Macross Delta	Macross	TV series		
2016	Mobile Suit Gundam Unicorn RE:0096	Gundam	TV series	Compilation	
2016	Kuromukuro	—N/a	TV series		
2016	Mobile Suit Gundam Thunderbolt: December Sky	Gundam	Film	Compilation	
2016	RS Project -Rebirth Storage-	—N/a	TV special		
2016	Regalia: The Three Sacred Stars	—N/a	TV series		
2016	Gundam Build Fighters Try: Island Wars	Gundam	TV special		
2016	Zegapain ADP	Zegapain	Film		
2016	Majestic Prince: Genetic Awakening	Majestic Prince	Film		
2016	Cyborg 009: Call of Justice	Cyborg 009	Film		
2017	ID-0	—N/a	TV series		
2017	Tomica Hyper Rescue Drive Head Kidō Kyūkyū Keisatsu	Tomica	TV series		
2017	Mobile Suit Gundam: Twilight AXIS	Gundam	ONA series		
2017	Symphogear AXZ	Symphogear	TV series		
2017	Knight's & Magic	—N/a	TV series		
2017	Gundam Build Fighters: Battlogue	Gundam	ONA series		
2017	Gundam Build Fighters: GM's Counterattack	Gundam	ONA film		
2017	Eureka Seven: Hi-Evolution 1	Eureka Seven	Film		
2017	Code Geass: Lelouch of the Rebellion I – Initiation	Code Geass	Film	Compilation	
2017	Mazinger Z: Infinity	Mazinger	Film		
2017	Mobile Suit Gundam Thunderbolt: Bandit Flower	Gundam	Film	Compilation	
2017	Mobile Suit Gundam: Twilight AXIS Red Trace	Gundam	Film	Compilation	
2017	Full Metal Panic! 1st Section: Boy Meets Girl	Full Metal Panic!	Film	Compilation	
2018–19	Shinkansen Henkei Robo Shinkalion	Shinkalion	TV series		
2018	Darling in the Franxx	—N/a	TV series		
2018	Full Metal Panic! 2nd Section: One Night Stand	Full Metal Panic!	Film	Compilation	
2018	Full Metal Panic! 3rd Section: Into the Blue	Full Metal Panic!	Film	Compilation	
2018	Macross Delta the Movie: Passionate Walküre	Macross	Film	Compilation	
2018	Code Geass: Lelouch of the Rebellion II – Transgression	Code Geass	Film	Compilation	
2018	Last Hope	—N/a	TV series		
2018	Gundam Build Divers	Gundam	TV series		
2018	Space Battleship Tiramisu	—N/a	TV series		
2018	Full Metal Panic! Invisible Victory	Full Metal Panic!	TV series		
2018	Code Geass: Lelouch of the Rebellion III – Glorification	Code Geass	Film	Compilation	
2018–19	Zoids Wild	Zoids	TV series		
2018	Planet With	—N/a	TV series		
2018	Tomica Hyper Rescue Drive Head Kidō Kyūkyū Keisatsu Movie	Tomica	Film		
2018	SSSS.Gridman	Gridman Universe	TV series		
2018	Anemone: Eureka Seven Hi-Evolution	Eureka Seven	Film		
2018	Mobile Suit Gundam Narrative	Gundam	Film		
2019	The Price of Smiles	—N/a	TV series		
2019	Revisions	—N/a	TV series		
2019	Code Geass Lelouch of the Re;surrection	Code Geass	Film		
2019	Mobile Suit Gundam: The Origin – Advent of the Red Comet	Gundam	TV series	Compilation	
2019	Promare	—N/a	Film		
2019–21	Fafner in the Azure: The Beyond	Fafner in the Azure	Film		
2019	Granbelm	—N/a	TV series		
2019	Symphogear XV	Symphogear	TV series		
2019–21	SD Gundam World Sangoku Soketsuden	Gundam	ONA series		
2019–20	Zoids Wild Zero	Zoids	TV series		
2019–20	Gundam Build Divers Re:Rise	Gundam	ONA series		
2019	Gundam Reconguista in G I: Go! Core Fighter	Gundam	Film	Compilation	
2019–20	Obsolete	—N/a	ONA series		
2019	Shinkansen Henkei Robo Shinkalion: Mirai Kara Shinsoku no ALFA-X	Shinkalion	Film		
2020	Gundam Reconguista in G II: Bellri's Fierce Charge	Gundam	Film	Compilation	
2020	Sakura Wars: The Animation	Sakura Wars	TV series		
2020	Listeners	—N/a	TV series		
2020–21	Tomica Bond Combination Earth Granner	Tomica	TV series		
2020	Mashin Eiyuuden Wataru: Shichikon no Ryuujinmaru	Mashin Hero Wataru	ONA series		
2020–22	Ghost in the Shell: SAC_2045	Ghost in the Shell	ONA series		
2020	Gundam Build Divers: Battlogue	Gundam	ONA film		
2021	Back Arrow	—N/a	TV series		
2021	Evangelion: 3.0+1.0 Thrice Upon a Time	Neon Genesis Evangelion	Film		
2021	SSSS.Dynazenon	Gridman Universe	TV series		
2021	SD Gundam World Heroes	Gundam	ONA series		
2021–22	Shinkansen Henkei Robo Shinkalion Z	Shinkalion	TV series		
2021–22	86: Eighty Six	—N/a	TV series		
2021	Knights of Sidonia: Love Woven in the Stars	Knights of Sidonia	Film		
2021	Mobile Suit Gundam: Hathaway's Flash	Gundam	Film		
2021	Getter Robo Arc	Getter Robo	TV series		
2021	Gundam Reconguista in G III: Legacy from Space	Gundam	Film	Compilation	
2021–23	Megaton Musashi	—N/a	TV series		
2021–22	Amaim Warrior at the Borderline	—N/a	TV series		
2021–22	Muv-Luv Alternative	Muv-Luv	TV series		
2021	Sakugan	—N/a	TV series		
2021	Macross Delta the Movie: Absolute Live!!!!!!	Macross	Film		
2021	Ancient Girl's Frame	—N/a	ONA series		
2021	Rumble Garanndoll	—N/a	TV series		
2021	Gundam Breaker Battlogue	Gundam	ONA series		
2021	Ghost in the Shell: SAC_2045 – Sustainable War	Ghost in the Shell	Film	Compilation	
2021	Eureka: Eureka Seven Hi-Evolution	Eureka Seven	Film		
2022	Mobile Suit Gundam: Cucuruz Doan's Island	Gundam	Film		
2022	Gundam Reconguista in G IV: Love That Cries Out in Battle	Gundam	Film	Compilation	
2022	Gundam Reconguista in G V: Beyond the Peril of Death	Gundam	Film	Compilation	
2022–23	Mobile Suit Gundam: The Witch from Mercury	Gundam	TV series		
2023	Fafner in the Azure: Behind the Line	Fafner in the Azure	Film		
2023	SSSS.Gridman	Gridman Universe	Film	Compilation	
2023	SSSS.Dynazenon	Gridman Universe	Film	Compilation	
2023	Gridman Universe	Gridman Universe	Film		
2023	Bullbuster	—N/a	TV series		
2023	Gundam Build Metaverse	Gundam	ONA series		
2023	Ghost in the Shell: SAC_2045 – The Last Human	Ghost in the Shell	Film	Compilation	
2024	Metallic Rouge	—N/a	TV series		
2024	Brave Bang Bravern!	—N/a	TV series		
2024	Mobile Suit Gundam SEED Freedom	Gundam	Film		
2024–25	Shinkalion: Change the World	Shinkalion	TV series		
2024	Code Geass: Rozé of the Recapture (part 1)	Code Geass	Film		
2024	Code Geass: Rozé of the Recapture (part 2)	Code Geass	Film		
2024	Code Geass: Rozé of the Recapture (part 3)	Code Geass	Film		
2024	Grendizer U	Mazinger	TV series		
2024	Code Geass: Rozé of the Recapture (part 4)	Code Geass	Film		
2024	Zegapain STA	Zegapain	Film		
2024	Gundam: Requiem for Vengeance	Gundam	ONA series		
2025	Aquarion: Myth of Emotions	Aquarion	TV series		
2025	Mashin Creator Wataru	Mashin Hero Wataru	TV series		
2025	The Red Ranger Becomes an Adventurer in Another World	—N/a	TV series		
2025	Mobile Suit Gundam GQuuuuuuX: Beginning	Gundam	Film	Compilation	
2025	Mobile Suit Gundam GQuuuuuuX	Gundam	TV series		

== See also ==
- BattleTech
- Gundam
- Megas XLR
- Symbionic Titan
- Super Robot Wars
- List of Sakura Wars media
- List of Transformers animated series
