= Gorō Taniguchi =

Japanese anime director

- Born: October 18, 1966 (age 59); Nisshin, Aichi, Japan
- Occupations: Anime director, writer, producer and storyboard artist
- Notable work: S-CRY-ed; Code Geass; Planetes; One Piece Film: Red

Gorō Taniguchi (谷口 悟朗, Taniguchi Gorō; born October 18, 1966) is a Japanese anime director, writer, producer and storyboard artist, who is among Sunrise's noted directors. He was born in Nisshin, Aichi, Japan.

== Works ==
=== Anime television series ===
- Zettai Muteki Raijin-Oh (storyboards, episode direction, background production; 1991)
- Genki Bakuhatsu Ganbaruger (storyboards, episode direction; 1992)
- Nekketsu Saikyo Gozaurer (storyboards, episode direction; 1993)
- Mobile Fighter G Gundam (storyboards, episode direction; 1994)
- Jūsenshi Gulkeeva (storyboards, episode direction; 1995)
- New Mobile Report Gundam Wing (storyboards; 1995)
- Brave Command Dagwon (storyboards, episode direction; 1996)
- After War Gundam X (storyboards; 1996)
- Reideen the Superior (storyboards, episode direction; 1996)
- The King of Braves GaoGaiGar (storyboards, episode direction; 1997)
- Kochira Katsushika-ku Kameari Kōen-mae Hashutsujo (storyboards; 1997)
- Gasaraki (assistant director, storyboards, episode direction; 1998)
- Infinite Ryvius (director, storyboards, episode direction; 1999)
- Yu-Gi-Oh! Duel Monsters (storyboard for episode 15; 2000)
- s-CRY-ed (director, storyboards, episode direction; 2001)
- Daigunder (storyboards, 2002)
- Shinkon Gattai Godannar: 1st (storyboards of ep. 3; 2003)
- Planetes (director, storyboards management, episode direction; 2003)
- Mai-HiME (creative producer; 2004)
- Honey and Clover (storyboards of ep. 5; 2005)
- Gun x Sword (director, storyboards; 2005)
- SoltyRei (planning coordinator; 2005)
- Code Geass: Lelouch of the Rebellion (director, original story, storyboards management; 2006)
- Bamboo Blade (guest appearance; 2007)
- Code Geass: Lelouch of the Rebellion R2 (director, original story; 2008)
- Linebarrels of Iron (creative producer; 2008)
- Dogs: Stray Dogs Howling in the Dark (production assistance; 2009)
- Yu-Gi-Oh! Zexal (storyboards for episodes 3 and 9; 2011)
- Fantasista Doll (creative producer; 2013)
- Space Dandy (storyboards for episodes 7 and 14; 2014)
- Maria the Virgin Witch (director; 2015)
- Active Raid (chief director; 2016)
- ID-0 (director; 2017)
- Revisions (director; 2019)
- Back Arrow (director, co-creator; 2021)
- Skate-Leading Stars (chief director; 2021)
- Estab Life: Great Escape (original concept, creative supervision; 2022)
- Dark Machine: The Animation (creative producer; 2026)

=== Anime films ===
- Jungle Taitei - Yūki ga Mirai o Kaeru (director, 2009)
- Code Geass Lelouch of the Re;surrection (director; 2019)
- One Piece Film: Red (director, storyboard; 2022)
- Bloody Escape (original concept, director, screenplay; 2024)
- Paris ni Saku Étoile (original concept, director; 2026)

=== Original video animations ===
- One Piece: Defeat The Pirate Ganzack (director; 1998) (special production of Super Jump Anime Tour)
- Kanzen Shōri Daitei Ō (storyboards; 2001)

=== Manga ===
- Code Geass: Jet-Black Renya (original script; 2010–2013)
- Atrail - Nisekawiteki Nichijou to Senmitsu Element (original script; 2015–2018)

=== Video games ===
- Estab Life: Unity Memories (original concept, creative supervision; TBA)
