= Kenji Uchida =

Japanese film producer

Kenji Uchida (内田 健二, Uchida Kenji) is a Japanese anime producer. He is a noted anime studio Sunrise's president.

Debuting in 1980, with Muteki Robo Trider G7, among Sunrise's first works in the 1980s, Uchida has gone on to produce numerous of Sunrise's works, such as various iterations of the Gundam universe and other Sunrise anime productions. In April 2008, Uchida was promoted to being Sunrise's president, previously having been the studio's managing director.

== Works ==
Anime television series

- Muteki Robo Trider G7 (1980–1981; production development)
- Saikyō Robo Dai-ōjo (1981–1982; production head)
- Sentō Mecha Xabungle (1982–1983; production desk)
- Sei Senshi Dunbine (1983–1984; production desk)
- Jū Senki L-Gaim (1984–1985; production desk)
- Mobile Suit Zeta Gundam (1985–1986; producer)
- Mobile Suit Gundam ZZ (1986–1987; producer)
- Mister Ajikko (1987–1989; producer)
- Eldran series (1991–1994; producer)
  - Zettai Muteki Raijin-Oh (絶対無敵ライジンオー, Zettai Muteki Raijinō) 1991
  - Genki Bakuhatsu Ganbaruger (元気爆発ガンバルガー, Genki Bakuhatsu Ganbarugā) 1992
  - Nekketsu Saikyo Gozaurer (熱血最強ゴウザウラー, Nekketsu Saikyō Gōzaurā) 1993
- The Big O (1999-2003; executive producer)
- Overman King Gainer (2002-2003; planning)
- Planetes (2003; planning)
- Zegapain (2006; planning)
- Code Geass: Lelouch of the Rebellion (2006–2008; planning)
- Intrigue in the Bakumatsu – Irohanihoheto (2006-2007; planning)

OVA and anime movies

- Dead Heat (1987; producer)
- Mobile Suit Gundam: Char's Counterattack (1988; producer)
- Mobile Suit SD Gundam (1988–1993; producer)
- Mobile Suit Gundam 0080: War in the Pocket (1989; producer)
- Mobile Suit Zeta Gundam movies: A New Translation (2005–2006; planning)
- Keroro Gunsō the Super Movie (2006; planning)
