= Armored Trooper VOTOMS: Pailsen Files =

Japanese OVA series

装甲騎兵ボトムズ ペールゼン・ファイルズ
- Genre: Action, Mecha, Science fiction
- Created by: Hajime Yatate; Ryōsuke Takahashi
- Original video animation
- Directed by: Ryōsuke Takahashi
- Written by: Sōji Yoshikawa
- Music by: Hiroki Inui; Yasuaki Maejima
- Studio: Sunrise; The Answer Studio
- Licensed by: NA: Maiden Japan
- Released: October 26, 2007 – August 22, 2008
- Episodes: 12
- Novel
- Written by: Sotsukasa Yoshikawa
- Published by: Hobby Japan
- Published: January 17, 2009
- Anime film

Armored Trooper VOTOMS: The Pailsen Files Movie
- Directed by: Ryosuke Takahashi
- Studio: Sunrise
- Released: January 17, 2009
- Runtime: 118 minutes

Armored Trooper VOTOMS: Pailsen Files (装甲騎兵ボトムズ ペールゼン・ファイルズ, Sōkō Kihei Botomuzu Peruzen Fairuzu) is a 12-episode OVA series from the Armored Trooper Votoms franchise that was released from 2007 to 2008. Set after the 1988 OVA movie The Red Shoulder Document: Roots of Ambition and months before the events of the VOTOMS television series, Pailsen Files explores the origins of Chirico Cuvie as explained by the Red Shoulder Battalion's now-disgraced commander, Col Yoran Pailsen.

The series is also notable for its use of 3D computer graphics, which have never been done in the history of the franchise.

== Premise ==
A few weeks after the Gilgamesh Confederation's victory over the Balarant Union at the desert planet Sunsa, the Melkian Space Force High Command arrests Red Shoulder Battalion commander Col Yoran Pailsen. He undergoes a court-martial over his management of the now-disbanded unit and his obsession with the supposed Perfect Soldier, Chirico Cuvie.

After being the only survivor in a botched operation, Cuvie is evacuated and reassigned to a five-man team of AT pilots that are seemingly as invulnerable as him.

=== Episode list ===
No.	Title	Original release date
1	"River Crossing Operation" (Japanese: 渡河作戦)	October 26, 2007
Chirico Cuvie joins the Gilgamesh Confederation army as it launches an amphibious invasion of a Balarant Union stronghold in the Taibas River on planet Lowmes. The Balarant defense holds the line and Chirico is the only survivor among the 1,500 Scopedogs and Diving Beetles that land. He is later evacuated to the planet Galeade. Meanwhile, in Melkia, a court-martial is convened for Red Shoulder Battalion commander Col Yoran Pailsen. The colonel does not reply to a military prosecutor's questions about the unit's operations and its supposed defiance of authority, especially during the Red Shoulders' recent uprising at its base on planet Odon. As the trial drags on, Melkian Information Ministry Undersecretary Fedok Wockam intervenes and presents new evidence while proposing that the proceedings be stopped. Pailsen suddenly suffers a mental breakdown, prompting Wockam to assume custody of him.
2	"Galeade" "Gareade" (Japanese: ガレアデ)	October 26, 2007
Chirico arrives at Galeade and recuperates on frontline base M7, where he meets AT pilots Garry Godan, Nol Berkhoff, and Glenborash Droka Zaki. He avoids Zaki's attempts to kill him. All four men are organized into one squad under Berkhoff's command - even as a mysterious sniper takes potshots at Chirico and Godan. The squad is transferred to base X2. M7 commander Yugunt, vice-commander Fuller and Army Sgt Maj Wapp are curious as to what Chirico is doing on the base and why the group was brought together.
3	"Squad" (Japanese: 分隊)	December 21, 2007
Berkhoff's team gets a fifth man, Dare Kochak, who proves to be much of a nuisance. The team is assigned to a night-time airdrop on a Balarant fortress balanced in the middle of Manid Gorge. The mission is vital; an elite Gilgamesh Army division is also passing through the gorge as part of a major offensive in the planet. The base defenders are alerted as the team lands and takes them out. Kochak is assigned to take out all Balarant Fatty ATs inside the base.
4	"The Valley of Death" (Japanese: 死の谷)	December 21, 2007
As the team takes a break, one Fatty located deep in the base is revealed to have survived Kochak's shooting spree. It angers Godan enough to punch Kochak for not making sure all were killed. The Fatty pilot activates the base's main gun. Despite Chirico and Zaki working together to stop the cannon, it fires at the canyon walls to force a cave-in and decimate much of the Gilgamesh Army division that is already passing through the gorge. Balarant fighters carpet-bombing the gorge add to the chaos, with at least 1,500 men dead or missing in action. The team escapes the collapsing base, but Chirico wonders why they were not reprimanded for the debacle. At a special facility run by the Melkian Information Ministry Intelligence Department on the planet Kuzsuk, Wockam brings out Pailsen for a friendly chat about the material in a disk called the "Pailsen Files."
5	"Examination" (Japanese: 尋問)	February 21, 2008
At the Kuzsuk facility, Wockam starts to talk to Pailsen about his past with the Red Shoulders, but Pailsen's silence prompts him to be hooked up to the MRC, a device that inhibits the body's self-defense mechanisms and makes the subject more susceptible to interrogation. Pailsen breaks down under the torture and starts to talk about his work with Chirico (which was first revealed in Roots of Ambition) and the fact that Chirico may be an "abnormal survivor," meaning he will not die under all circumstances. Back at base M7, Berkhoff's team undergoes maintenance exercises, but an accident occurs during a polymer ringer liquid (PRL) fueling drill, which douses Chirico and sets him ablaze. He survives the accident and Godan is elated at having switched places with Chirico moments before. Wapp implies that the accident may have been engineered by bitter survivors of the Manid Gorge disaster. The team are later harassed by masked men all over the base. The base command declares an alert to take down the team, but Kochak, who is revealed to be Yugunt and Fuller's mole on the team, is not concerned.
6	"Abnormal Skills" (Japanese: 異能)	February 21, 2008
The M7 forces mobilize to stop Berkhoff's team, but they find ways to get out of a tough scrape and capture one masked man who may have dark secrets about Godan's origins. When the team is trapped in the base's PRL tank farm, the security forces plant bombs all over the area. The potential damage from such a huge amount of PRL prompts the team to commandeer two Scopedogs stashed as security units and douse them with fire-retardants to at least withstand the high temperatures of the exploding fuel. Pailsen is hooked up again to the MRC and explains the potential of Chirico's "abnormal survivor" ability to change the environment around him. It is proven true as the PRL tank farm explodes and the team survives the conflagration, which creates a huge mushroom cloud reaching into the upper atmosphere. Seeing that Galeade no longer has any value in the war effort, Wockam's aide, Cotta Ruske, orders Yugunt to have all Gilgamesh military forces evacuate the planet immediately. Kochak later kills Fuller and Yugunt.
7	"Sniping" (Japanese: 狙撃)	April 25, 2008
Berkhoff's team is ordered to redeploy to the Army's base near the north pole, but their transport plane goes down on the way. Snipers from the so-called "Gilgamesh Purification Committee" (GPC) demand that the team surrender Godan, who is revealed to be a war criminal named the "Shirasko Reaper." The team work out a way to make the plane launch and deploy their ATs in the process, but not before Godan accidentally kills the co-pilot, a GPC agent who sabotaged the plane's flight controls to make it crash. The team's Scopedogs finally deploy and Godan massacres the GPC snipers before pushing ahead with their trek.
8	"Frozen Prison" (Japanese: 冷獄)	April 25, 2008
The M7 base's new commander, Logwood, gives Wapp a field commission to lieutenant and assigns him to take charge of the Arctic base while investigating Yugunt and Fuller's deaths. A GPC agent also gives Wapp a mission folder on the Berkhoff team. As the team arrives at the base four days late, another complication arises; the explosion at the PRL tank farm and the mushroom cloud it caused will blot out the atmosphere and create extremely strong cold fronts in addition to temperatures dropping to -185 degrees Celsius. When Wapp meets the team, he sets Berkhoff aside and blackmails him with information about his demotion from first lieutenant to find Yugunt and Fuller's killer. After the team intercepts a Balarant patrol, Berkhoff asks everybody to get back to base and to hunker down for extreme cold weather. All the while, a much larger Balarant force descends on the base.
9	"Down Burst" "Daunu Barusuto" (Japanese: ダウン・バースト)	June 25, 2008
Wapp activates the base's automated defenses while he gets angry at Berkhoff for not following his orders - and when he does reveal the truth, no one pays attention. Kochak, who was formerly a member of the military's AT research department, enlists the team's help in a special equation for making a PRL mix that can withstand extreme cold temperatures of at least -250 degrees. As the cold downburst falls and the Balarant forces are caked in permafrost, the team huddles together to keep warm. Wapp pilots a Standing Tortoise to confirm the team's deaths, but his AT explodes as he gloats about his survival. The special PRL in the team's Scopedogs light up once again, confirming Wockam's assumptions that the five men are indeed "abnormal survivors."
10	"Strategic Motion" (Japanese: 戦略動議)	June 25, 2008
Wockam convenes a meeting at the Supreme State Strategic Conference Building in Melkia and proposes "Operation Z0-5" - a major assault on the Balarant fortress planet Monad, designed to help the Gilgamesh Confederation have the upper hand in secret peace talks with the Balarant Union. Defense Secretary Noidod, who is connected to the meeting via video-conference, dies when his helicopter crashes on the way, prompting suspicions about Wockam being the instigator. Seeing that the Berkhoff team survived Galeade, Wockam brings them to Kuzsuk for three days' vacation leave and apologizes to Pailsen for putting him through so much pain, returning his disk at the same time. Wokkam informs them that they have been assigned under the Intelligence Department's ISS special operations command, promising cushier benefits. With around 120 million soldiers assigned to the Monad operation, the military leadership expresses concerns over the operation draining much of the Gilgamesh Confederation's economy in just four days. It is the least of their worries as the Gilgamesh forces finally launch the attack.
11	"The Immortal Unit" (Japanese: 不死の部隊)	August 22, 2008
The Gilgamesh forces fight their way past the Balarant's Monad defense network as the ISS' AT squadrons penetrate into the planet's central core in an attempt to take over its control systems. However, as they implant the control devices at the core's energy extractor, Berkhoff's squad suddenly crashes through a black void, hear mysterious screams, and appear in the middle of another AT battle somewhere in Monad before they plunge into another junk pit. Subsequent arguments between all members result in Zaki finally revealing Chirico's origins as a Red Shoulder and they deduce that the previous incidents were all Wockam's doing to discover more abnormal survivors. The fact that they all survived together so far reinforces such belief and they rejoin the fight ... until Kochak is badly hit from a surprise attack by two Fattys.
12	"Monad" "Monado" (Japanese: モナド)	August 22, 2008
Despite being hit, Kochak still fights on and his Scopedog is totally destroyed. His death reminds the team of their mortality as Wockam begins to bask in the success of his plan. Balarant Fattys continue to engage them, with Godan's Scopedog wrecked from two bazooka hits. Godan passes away from his wounds in the cockpit after Berkhoff administers painkillers. Tremors are detected all over Monad, and Chirico learns that all Balarant forces have been ordered to leave the planet. Chirico, Zaki and Berkhoff try to find an intact launch catapult while fighting off Balarant troops just as desperate to get out; Berkhoff dies in a suicidal charge to buy time for Chirico and Zaki's escape. As they secure an escape pod, Monad's energy core goes haywire and the entire planet explodes, killing Gilgamesh and Balarant forces in the immediate vicinity. Stunned by the carnage, Gilgamesh Army command orders the Intelligence Department complex sealed off and has Wockam arrested, but he and Ruske escape in time. Aboard the escape pod, Chirico tries to talk to Zaki about ignoring any mental programming to kill him. Zaki asks Chirico to kill the man who brainwashed him before killing himself. At Kuzsuk, Wockam is surprised to see Pailsen in good health and in uniform. The colonel explains that the man who operated the MRC on him was one of his associates, and Wockam fully believed all the fake data in the Pailsen Files disk. As Pailsen leaves, Wockam tries to kill him but Ruske shoots Wockam instead and offers to work for the colonel. Chirico places Zaki's corpse in a body bag before he sedates himself to sleep.

== Characters ==
- Chirico Cuvie – A former member of the Red Shoulder Battalion, Cuvie is known for his uncanny ability to dive into extremely dangerous situations and always come out alive. By the time of the Pailsen Files, he has been reassigned back to the Army after the fiasco in Roots of Ambition. Voiced by: Hozumi Goda
- MSgt Noll Berkhoff – A 32-year-old AT pilot skilled in meteorology, Berkhoff was demoted to sergeant from first lieutenant for desertion before the events of the series. He redeems himself in the final episode by single-handedly taking on the Balarant. Voiced by: Takashi Nagasako
- MSgt Dare Kochak – An obese 34-year-old man, Dare is ridiculed for his timidity and weight, but proves his worth in the operations at the Arctic base. Voiced by: Tetsuo Goto
- MSgt Garry Godan – The burliest in the group, Godan is known for his vicious battle abilities. It is revealed that he killed comrades as they tried to escape the battlefield. Voiced by: Hisao Egawa
- Cpl Glenborash Droka Zaki – An artificially-created Perfect Soldier, Zaki is 16 years old. He was brainwashed to kill Chirico but commits suicide in the final episode. Voiced by: Masahito Yabe
- Col Yoran Pailsen – The former commander of the Red Shoulder Battalion. Pailsen is arrested based on the information Virgil Carson was able to send to the Gilgamesh military intelligence service during the events of Roots of Ambition. Over the course of the series, Pailsen explains the data in his Pailsen Files disk, but reveals that everything he shared is fake. Voiced by: Chikao Otsuka
- Fedok Wockam – The undersecretary of the Melkian Information Ministry's Intelligence Department. Wockam is intrigued by reports of Chirico's infamous survival ability and interrogates Pailsen to learn more. Voiced by: Unshou Ishizuka
- Cotta Ruske – Wockam's deputy in the Intelligence Department. He kills Wockam in the final episode. His cryptic words in the finale imply that he is television series character Jean-Paul Rochina. Voiced by: Banjo Ginga, who is also the series narrator.
- Sgt Maj Wapp – A non-commissioned officer at Galeade base M7, Wapp relishes putting the Berkhoff squad through hardships. Voiced by: Masashi Hirose

== Releases ==
=== Home media ===
The episodes were released on six DVDs starting from October 26, 2007, until August 22, 2008. Each DVD package contains two episodes.

=== Movie version ===
Released on January 17, 2009, Armored Trooper VOTOMS: Pailsen Files The Movie is a feature-length version of the OVA series. The movie contains many of the series' important moments, plus new footage:

- An introductory scene where Red Shoulder Battalion Scopedog Turbo Custom ATs at their Odon base assemble in formation for Pailsen, who receives a Gilgamesh Army military police detail that serves him an arrest warrant. The Scopedogs draw their weapons at the arresting team, but Pailsen signals them to hold their fire, implying that he is turning himself in.
- A closing scene where Chirico and Zaki's escape pod reaches an unknown planet, with a cover of the classic VOTOMS intro theme song Honoo No Sadame (Destiny of the Flames) playing in the background. After the pod crashes on the surface, Chirico buries Zaki and walks away.

=== Books ===
- Armored Trooper Votoms Pailsen Files (novel) by Soji Yoshikawa, published by: Hobby Japan, released on January 17, 2009 ISBN 978-4894257573
- Pailsen Files Votoms VISUAL BOOK Published by: Hobby Japan, released on September 16, 2008 ISBN 978-4894257627

=== Toys/Models ===
TakaraTomy produced ATs from the series as part of its Arctic Gear line of three-inch action figures. The Berkhoff squad Scopedogs are pre-packaged with the first five Pailsen Files DVDs while the sixth DVD contains a special Scopedog Turbo Custom painted in the dull gray colors of the Melkian Information Ministry's ISS special operations command. The other figures in the line include two-pack reissues of previously released units (such as the Scopedog, Fatty, and Diving Beetle with Spring Bobbin carpet track system), Wapp's Standing Tortoise, and the Berkhoff squad Scopedog Turbo Customs in ISS and arctic camouflage colors, plus an ISS Dog Carrier transport with free ISS Scopedog Turbo Custom. Each figure comes with a file card. The arctic camouflage units also have special snowshoe attachments.

Model kit companies Wave and Bandai also released kits of ATs as they appeared in the series.

== Theme songs ==
Opening: Lullaby of Iron
Ending: Bye-Bye Brother

Performed By: George Yanagi

== Reception ==
Chris Guanche of Mecha and Anime HQ rated the movie at 4/5, stating that the absence of several scenes, including those of Yugunt and Fuller, improved the movie's pacing. He added that the concentration of important scenes can also be lessons for future Gundam compilation films. Andy Hanley of UK Anime Network summarized the film version: "The bare bones of a decent story are here, but they're buried beneath an incredibly clumsy theatrical adaptation which feels awkward, disjointed and often confusing."
