= Eldran series =

Japanese media franchise

The Eldran series (エルドランシリーズ, Erudoran shirīzu) is a toy and Japanese anime franchise owned by the animation studio Sunrise (known for its mecha series, most notably Gundam) and mainly funded and sponsored by Tomy.

== Series overview ==
- Zettai Muteki Raijin-Oh (絶対無敵ライジンオー, Zettai Muteki Raijin Ō) (April 1991–March 1992)
- Genki Bakuhatsu Ganbaruger (元気爆発ガンバルガー, Genki Bakuhatsu Ganbarugā) (April 1992–February 1993)
- Nekketsu Saikyō Go-Saurer (熱血最強ゴウザウラー, Nekketsu Saikyō Gōzaurā) (March 1993–February 1994)
- Kanzen Shouri Daiteioh (完全勝利ダイテイオー, Kanzen Shōri Daitei Ō) (2002, cancelled)

Kanzen Shouri Daiteioh was planned to be made into a TV series, but instead only a pilot episode OVA and a manga based on the pilot was made. However, this series appears in Super Robot Wars NEO.

=== Series summaries and context ===
Every year, whenever kinds of evil attempt world domination, the patron saint "Eldran" entrusts main robots and auxiliary robots to only elementary school children regardless of grade, class and how many of the children in the class should there be if in the case, 18 children (usually in the case of Raijin-Oh and Gosaurer), 19 children (in the case of Daiteioh), or 100 or more children. This is because adults cannot fight the evil alone and are incapable of piloting the Eldran Robots (usually, General Takeda believes that adults save the world). They control the robots by co-operating, and confront different types of evil organizations who attempt to take over the Earth. The idea was that a school (or in the case of Ganbaruger, Revolger and Gekiryuger, it's various places in a large town) could house the large transforming robots and their base would be the school that the kids would go to.

=== Similarities with Yūsha ===
When the Eldran series was conceived by Tomy, Takara (who would later merge with Tomy) had begun making the Brave series (Yūsha series in Japan). The robots in each series would combine in certain ways to become a powerful robot and later new robots would be introduced that could combine with the title robot. When Takara and Tomy merged into TakaraTomy, the similarities between the two franchises led to Raijin-Oh being featured in the PlayStation 2 video game Brave Wars alongside several Brave characters.
