= Matchless Raijin-Oh =

1991 Japanese television anime

- 絶対無敵ライジンオー
- Genre: Adventure, Mecha
- Created by: Hajime Yatate
- Written by: Hideki Sonoda
- Directed by: Toshifumi Kawase
- Music by: Kohei Tanaka
- Country of origin: Japan
- Original language: Japanese
- No. of episodes: 51

Production
- Producers: Shinsuke Kurabayashi (TV Tokyo); Toshihiko Fujinami (Yomiko); Kenji Uchida (Sunrise)
- Production companies: TV Tokyo; Yomiko Advertising; Sunrise

Original release
- Network: TXN (TV Tokyo)
- Release: April 3, 1991 – March 25, 1992

Related
- Original video animation

Raijin-Oh Final
- Directed by: Toshifumi Kawase
- Written by: Hideki Sonoda
- Music by: Kohei Tanaka
- Studio: Sunrise
- Released: August 5, 1992 – February 24, 1993
- Runtime: 30 minutes
- Episodes: 4

Matchless Raijin-Oh (絶対無敵ライジンオー, Zettai Muteki Raijin-Oh; lit. Absolutely Invincible Raijin-Oh) is a 51 episode Japanese anime television series, and the first generation Eldran franchise funded by Tomy and produced by Sunrise. It aired in Japan from April 3, 1991, to March 25, 1992, and later be succeeded by the second generation of the Eldran series Genki Bakuhatsu Ganbaruger. The story revolves around a group of elementary school children who are given command of a mecha named Raijin-Oh and their efforts to defend the Earth from the evil Jaaku (evil) Empire. There is also a four-episode OVA sequel.

Anime Midstream, Inc. announced in December, 2008, that it acquired the license for and planned to release the anime series Matchless Raijin-Oh in the U.S. sometime in 2009 as their first anime release. The company began selling the first volume of the series direct from their website, as well as several other online retailers as of late December 2009. The first volume contained episodes 1–5. The second volume, containing episodes 6–10, was released in September 2010, and translated the title beginning with this volume (and current printings of the first volume are now also marketed under that title). The third volume was released on July 12, 2011, containing episodes 11–15. Each volume contains English and Japanese audio, as well as special features such as music videos, clean openings/closings, voice bloopers, and the third volume contains an audio commentary with several of the English voice actors. Two more volumes were released on June 30, 2012, for volume four and July 1, 2013, for volume five.

The rest of the series was released as a five-disc boxset; the Season 2 Collection, released on September 30, 2014. However, this set is in Japanese with English subtitles only.

== Plot ==
Prior to Ganbaruger arriving to Earth, an evil organization which was named the Evil Empire (ジャーク帝国, Jāku Teikoku) comes to Earth with the intent to conquer and despoil it. From their fortress they launch a missile that will flood the world with (Akudamas (アークダーマ, Ākudama)), eggs of darkness which hatch into evil monsters called (Evil Beasts (邪悪獣, Jāku Jyū)) based on things that annoy or frustrate humans.

The "guardian of light" Eldran appears, an Ultraman-like entity who is sworn to protect the universe and Earth in particular then appears. Using the heroic robot Raijin-Oh, Eldran attempts to thwart the Evil Empire by preventing a missile from striking Earth. What happens instead is that the missile detonated against Eldran, throwing Raijin-Oh down to Earth. The robot crashes into Japan's Hinobori city (日昇町 (Hinobori Chō)) a neighboring town to Aozora and Harukaze, elementary school Hinobori Academy.

Eldran must leave to continue protecting the Earth, so he leaves the duty of defeating the Evil Beasts to a 5th grade classroom full of children, Earth Defense Class (地球防衛組, Chikyuu Bouei Gumi) in the school where he crashed. He entrusts the children with Raijin-Oh, granting each child a different role to perform in either operating or supporting Raijin-Oh. Eldran also transforms their school itself, so it can transform into a command center when Raijin-Oh is needed. Jin, Asuka and Kouji are chosen to lead Raijin-oh, but every day they have many amusing experiences in the school. Jin does not want to study, while his friends do and force him to do it by tickling him. Whenever Belzeb and Taida obtain Jaku Satan and power up the Evil Beasts into Super Evil Beasts, the auxiliary robot Bakuryuu-Oh will show up and both mecha will form into God Raijin-Oh and must use their forces to defeat the Evil Empire Emperor Warusa and defeat the organization once and for all.

== Characters ==
=== Earth Defense Class (地球防衛組, Chikyuu Bouei Gumi) ===
Jin Hyuga (日向 仁, Hyuuga Jin)

Voiced by: Rica Matsumoto

Jin Hyuga is the main pilot of Ken-oh and Raijin-Oh and God Raijin-Oh. He is brash, a braggart, and very good at sports. He has spiky hair, is boss of the kids, and has a strong sense of justice. His student number is the eighth. He often quarrels with Maria, but they trust each other. His father, Chuutarou Hyuuga and his wife run a sake shop, the Hyuga Store, which is used as a front for the Hyuga home. Jin's room is on top of the Hyuga Store. His cousin's name is "Youtarou Hyuuga".

Asuka Tsukishiro (月城 飛鳥, Tsukishiro Asuka)

Voiced by: Rie Iwatsubo

Asuka Tsukishiro is the main pilot of Hou-oh, and flight and altitude controller for Raijin-Oh, God Raijin-Oh. He is a handsome, smart, rich, realist, but a vain and timid boy. He is very popular with girls in the class, and has his own fan club. His student number is seventh. Hiryu Tsukishiro is his cousin, who is the pilot of Ryu-Oh. His father takes him skiing every winter and his mother's name is called Ayako.

Koji Hoshiyama (星山 吼児, Hoshiyama Kouji)

Voiced by: Mari Maruta

Koji Hoshiyama is the main pilot of Jyu-oh, also the power controller for both Raijin-Oh and God Raijin-Oh, and all-weapon controller. He is kind-hearted, timid but courageous, has a pair of binoculars, and he believes in UFOs and aliens. His student number is ninth.

Maria Shiratori (白鳥 マリア, Shiratori Maria)

Voiced by: Konami Yoshida

Maria Shiratori is a commander in the Earth Defense Class, and the main pilot of Bakuryu-oh. She is smart, strong-willed, daring, has a ponytail, and is half Japanese and half French.

Tsutomu Kojima (小島 勉, Kojima Tsutomu)

Voiced by: Bin Shimada

Tsutomu Kojima is the advisor in the Earth Defense Class, and computer operator. Tsutomu is a smart, polite, stubborn, and a typical nerd with bobbed hair and thick glasses who likes to study and research. He has done an analysis of the robots of Eldran. The mad scientist of the Saurers, Takako Kojima is Tsutomu's relative and cousin, who he respects her.

Kirara Haruno (春野 きらら, Haruno Kirara)

Voiced by: Kyoko Minami

Kirara Haruno is mainly an operator with the outside. Kirara is an honest, frank, fluffy long-haired girl, and is a broadcasting committee member. She wants to be a newscaster, and is Asuka's fan club president.

Akira Imamura (今村 あきら, Imamura Akira)

Voiced by: Kyoko Minami

Akira Imamura is an operator of core robots's starting system and weapon selector of Bakuryu-oh. Akira is a pretentious sore loser and a punk boy who wants to be a rock star, and had put the mesh in his hair.

Reiko Ikeda (池田 れい子, Ikeda Reiko)

Voiced by: Saori Suzuki

Reiko Ikeda is mainly an operator with Raijin-Oh. Reiko is a lively, curious, big almond-shape eyed girl who is a big wrestling fan, and she troubled with the fact that she's the shortest student in the class. She is in love with Tsutomu. Her parents run a gas station in Hinobori.

Miki Mano (真野 美紀, Mano Miki)

Voiced by: Saori Suzuki

Miki Mano is the energy gauge manager, launcher of Bakuryu Cutter fire, and safety manager of Bakuryu-oh's weapons. Miki is diligent, but quickly gives up, and is a member of the breeding committee. She was once afraid of dogs, but after Shippo was found at school, she adopted him and welcomed him into the family.

Hiroshi Takamori (高森 ひろし, Takamori Hiroshi)

Voiced by: Mami Matsui

Hiroshi Takamori is a vice-commander in the Earth Defense Class, safety manager of Raijin-Oh's weapons, and sub pilot of Bakuryu-oh. Hiroshi is the male representative of the class, and is usually inconspicuous, but trusted. He's in love with Cookie, his childhood friend.

Orie Ishizuka (石塚 織絵, Ishizuka Orie)

Voiced by: Mami Matsui

Orie Ishizuka, known as "Potato", is Hou-oh's all sensor systems monitor, and Raijin-oh's damage counter. Orie is a generous, strong-willed, chubby girl who loves potato chips.

Yoko Kuriki (栗木 容子, Kuriki Youko)

Voiced by: Rie Iwatsubo

Yoko Kuriki, known as "Cookie", is Raijin-oh's radar operator. Cookie is a short, big-eyed girl who likes adorable things, but has strong dependence on others and can't do anything on her own. Her own teddy bear turns into an evil beast in episode 11.

Yoshiaki Ogawa (小川 よしあき, Ogawa Yoshiaki)

Voiced by: Tomoe Sato Voiced by:Brandy Luttrell (English Dub)

Yoshiaki Ogawa, known as "Yoppa" is Ken-oh's circuit-based monitor, and Bakuryu-oh's transformation manager. 'Yoppa' is an own-pacer, lacking in cooperation, fat boy with spiky hair, who's somehow lovable. He lives with his parents and his grandfather operates a one man plane.

Tokie Sakai (坂井 ときえ, Sakai Tokie)

Voiced by: Tomoe Sato

Tokie Sakai is Jyu-oh's sensor systems monitor, and Bakuryu-oh's damage counter manager. Tokie wears overalls, meddles, and likes super heroes. She became friends with Osekkaizar, the evil beast from episode 36. Her parents run an izakaya.

Hidenori Kondo (近藤 ひでのり, Kondo Hidenori)

Voiced by: Konami Yoshida

Hidenori Kondo is Raijin-oh's radar operator. Hidenori is a super-rich, small, kind-hearted, polite, shy boy.

Daisuke Sato (佐藤 大介, Satou Daisuke)

Voiced by: Kozo Shioya

Daisuke Sato is Ken-oh's circuit system monitor, launcher of Bakuryu Cannon fire, and main mechanic of robots. Daisuke is the tallest and biggest student in the class, but a gentle, shy boy, and the eldest son of large family. He has learned to take care of his siblings whenever his parents are away anytime.

Yu Izumi (泉 ゆう, Izumi Yuu)

Voiced by: Megumi Hayashibara

Yu Izumi is a commander in Earth Defense Class, and main pilot of Bakuryu-oh. Yu is sickly, shy, timid, and has braided hair. She is the tallest girl in the class. Her sister, Ruriko Izumi is a first grader who hates vegetables, but after an incident with a Jaku Beast, she starts to accept vegetables at lunch.

Aiko Shimada (島田 愛子, Shimada Aiko)

Voiced by: Ai Sato, Rica Matsumoto(since episode 37)

Aiko Shimada, known as "Love" is Ken-oh's sensors system monitor, and Bakuryu-oh's pulse checker. Aiko is a mature, tall girl who is good at sports, and is a physical education committee member.

=== Other ===
Shuntaro Shinoda (篠田 俊太郎, Shinoda Shuntarou)

Voiced by: Kiyoyuki Yanada

The 25-year-old Homeroom teacher of 5th Grade Class 3 in Hinobori Elementary School, known as the Earth Defense Class. Mr. Shinoda is a young passionate teacher who loves the students, but he has often been disturbed a lesson by Evil Beasts.

Ruruko Himeki (姫木 るる子, Himeki Ruruko)

Voiced by: Megumi Hayashibara

A 23 year old kind, beautiful public health doctor in Hinobori Elementary School. Mr. Shinoda has a crush on her.

Eikichiro Yazawa (矢沢 永吉郎, Yazawa Eikichirou)

Voiced by: Toshiro Ishii

The 65-year-old principal of Hinobori Elementary who is a good supporter for 5th Grade Class 3. he's master of Tai Chi, also adviser of Kenpo club. He has a pet goat that is named Carol.

Carol (キャロル, Kyaroru)

The Goat of Hinobori School who eats grass in the schoolyard every day. She is the exceptional pet of Eikichiro Yazawa.

General Takeda (武田長官, Takeda Choukan)

Voiced by: Tomomichi Nishimura

General of the Defense forces. He had objected to the children fight but cooperates with them later. In Genki Bakuhatsu Ganbaruger, he has a daughter who went by the name of Katsura. He appears in all of the Eldran franchise when the years went on progressing, such as dealing the cases of The Demon World in Aozora, the Mechanization Empire in Harukaze and the Onigashima in Gokuraku.

Eldran (エルドラン, Erudoran)

Voiced by: Bin Shimada

Eldran is Earth's guardian. 400 years ago prior to Raijin-Oh, Ganbaruger, Gosaurer and Daiteioh's appearances, Eldran has sealed Gokuark and had been fighting against Gokuark but it results into transforming into a white dragon at the demon world. He is the warrior of light who gave Raijin-oh to the Earth Defense Class in order to defeat the Evil Empire. He also later gives out Ganbaruger in Aozora, Gosaurer in Harukaze as he was fighting the Mechanization Empire in the dinosaur era about 64 million years ago and Daiteioh in Gokuraku as the years progress one by one.

=== Jark Empire (ジャーク帝国, Jāku Teikoku) ===
Emperor Warusa (皇帝ワルーサ, Koutei Wruusa)

Voiced by: Shigezō Sasaoka

Ruler of the Jark Empire, that exists in the five dimensions.

Belzeb (ベルゼブ, Beruzebu)

Voiced by: Kiyoyuki Yanada

Commander in Jark Empire, also main pilot of Jark Satan. Belzeb is a handsome, quick temper, strict warrior with long purple hair. The creatures in five dimension are able deform their own bodies like the amoeba, and have the power of teleportation.

Falzeb (ファルゼブ, Faruzebu)

Voiced by: Megumi Hayashibara

Belzeb's Alter ego, Falzeb is small woman look-like fairy with silver-haired and kimono. living in sub-space in Belzeb's chest, Falzeb turns devil face at the time irradiation the Jark Power.

Taidar (タイダー, Taidaa)

Voiced by: You Yoshimura, Mahito Tsujimura(since episode 39)

Belzeb's subordinates. Taidar is a happy-go-lucky, leisurely, faithfulness, bearded plump man with punk fashion. He often gets an outburst of anger from Belzeb and Falzeb. Taidar is hired at Hyuga Store later, he appeared as a minor character also Genki Bakuhatsu Ganbaruger frequently.

Gokudo (ゴクドー, Gokudoo)

Voiced by: Akio Ōtsuka

Appears at the OVA during the Genki Bakuhatsu Ganbaruger arc, a new evil guy from Jark Empire.

== The Robots ==
=== Ken-Oh (剣王, Ken-Oo) ===
- Specs
  - Height: 15.4 meters
  - Weight: 10.0 tons
  - Top Speed: 420 kilometers per hour
  - Power Output: 5,500 metric horsepower (4,000 kW)

Ken-Oh (literally "Sword King") is a humanoid robot, piloted by Jin, the leader of the trio. It has a sword called the Ken-Oh Blade, which protrudes from the shield on Ken-Oh's back when needed. It forms the torso of the Raijin-Oh.

=== Hou-Oh (鳳王, Hou-Oo) ===
- Specs
  - Length: 35.7 meters
  - Weight: 15.5 tons
  - Ground Movement Speed: 80 kilometers per hour
  - Top Flying Speed: Mach 9
  - Power Output: 38,000 metric horsepower (28,000 kW)

Hou-Oh (literally "Phoenix King") resembles a phoenix. It is piloted by Asuka, and is the fastest of the trio. Hou-Oh forms the arms and wings of Raijin-Oh.

=== Juu-Oh (獣王, Juu-Oh) ===
- Specs
  - Length: 30.5 meters
  - Weight: 28.5 tons
  - Top Speed: 640 kilometers per hour
  - Power Output: 99,000 metric horsepower (73,000 kW)

Juu-Oh's (literally "Beast King") appearance is that of a lion, and is controlled by Kouji. It forms the legs of the Raijin-Oh and the lion head is used as a shield which contains the Raijin Sword. Juu-Oh is the strongest of the trio.

=== Raijin-Oh (ライジンオー/雷神王, Raijin-Oo) ===
- Specs
  - Height: 25 meters
  - Weight: 54 tons
  - Ground Movement Speed: 880 kilometers per hour
  - Top Flying Speed: Mach 10
  - Power Output: 200,000 metric horsepower (150,000 kW)

Raijin-Oh (literally thunder god king) is the first Eldran robot before Ganbaruger was the second. If the enemy becomes too powerful for the trio to handle individually, all three robots will combine, and they form into Raijin-Oh, a large humanoid robot with wings. In the early parts of the series, Raijin-Oh will trap its opponent with a beam from the Raijin Shield and finish it off with the Raijin Sword.

=== Bakuryu-Dragon (バクリュウドラゴン, Bakuryuu-Doragon) ===
- Specs
  - Length: 58 meters
  - Weight: 70 tons
  - Ground Movement Speed: 130 kilometers per hour
  - Top Flying Speed: Mach 20
  - Power Output: 380,000 metric horsepower (280,000 kW)

After the evil commander Belzeb (short for Beelzebub or Satan) was given a giant crystal robot named Jaaku Satan by Emperor Warza (literally "evil emperor") to assists the Jaaku Beasts in destroying Raijin-Oh, the Raijin-Oh soon realized that it was unable to defeat its enemies alone. At the brink of defeat, the Earth Defense Class managed to uncover one last robot, Bakuryu-Dragon bears the appearance of a dragon but can transform into a humanoid robot, Bakuryu-Oh.

=== Bakuryu-Oh (バクリュウオー, Bakuryuu-Oh) ===
- Specs
  - Height: 27.5 meters
  - Weight: 62 tons
  - Ground Movement Speed: 800 kilometers per hour
  - Top Flying Speed: Mach 14
  - Power Output: 320,000 metric horsepower (240,000 kW)

Bakuryu-Dragon's humanoid form. As strong as Raijin-oh, its arsenal includes a cannon and a shield.

=== God Raijin-Oh (ゴッドライジンオー, Goddo Raijin-Oo) ===
- Specs
  - Height: 41 meters
  - Weight: 116 tons
  - Ground Movement Speed: 1,200 kilometers per hour
  - Top Flying Speed: Mach 22
  - Power Output: 830,000 metric horsepower (610,000 kW)

The Raijin-Oh and Bakuryu-Oh can further combine to form the ultimate robot, God Raijin-Oh. In the early parts of its appearance, God Raijin-Oh finishes off Jaaku Beasts with a cannon. Soon after the God Raijin-Oh Sword is discovered and is used since then to defeat Super Jaaku Beasts (Jaaku Satan combined with a powered-up Jaaku Beast).

== Cultural impact ==
Raijin-Oh was a tremendously popular series at the time of its release, spawning two similar sequels and OVAs. This led to waves of similar TV shows in the early 90s, where a child or children were made into the pilots of giant robots. This was a significant change of pace for the mecha genre, which usually pursued an older demographic and used teenage or adult characters as pilots.

Raijin-Oh success would inspire future shows like Gear Fighter Dendoh, Machine Robo Rescue, Tomica Hyper Rescue Drive Head Kidō Kyūkyū Keisatsu, and Shinkansen Henkei Robo Shinkalion. The spiritual successors contain many plot elements that directly similar to Raijin-Oh's premise, characters, but, with the exception of not having a school to house the robots or an Eldran-like being to create them. Otherwise, Raijin-Oh had little worldwide impact, despite some success in Southeast Asian countries like China and Taiwan.

Raijin-Oh was featured in the New Century Brave Wars game, along with several of the Yuusha series robots, also created by Sunrise at around the same time. The reason for this was likely to have been the similarities between the Yuusha series and the Eldran trilogy, that and both series were animated by Sunrise. The toy company which made the Yuusha series, Takara would later merge with Tomy and thus both companies had access to each other's toy ideas, hence why Raijin-Oh was part of the video game. However the other two Eldran series, Genki Bakuhatsu Ganbaruger and Nekketsu Saikyo Go-Saurer were not included; in fact, a few of the Yuusha series robots were also left out of the game. Raijin-oh, Ganbaruger, and Gosaurer may have been included in the Brave Saga New Asteria game.

Raijin-Oh has appeared in several installments of Banpresto's Super Robot Wars series of games. It has appeared in Super Robot Wars GC and its remake, Super Robot Wars XO, Super Robot Wars NEO, and Super Robot Wars BX. This is in part due to the fact that the Super Robot Wars series largely concerned itself with '70s and '80s series at the time the game series began in the early '90s. As of 2009, Raijin-Oh is nearly 20 years old and therefore old enough to be nostalgic to adult gamers. It is not clear why Raijin-Oh had only appeared in the 3D Super Robot Wars games that appear on Nintendo consoles, as opposed to the more popular 2D games that appear on PlayStation systems and Nintendo handhelds until the release of BX.

== Episode list ==
No.	Title	Original release date
1	"Raijin-Oh arrives!"	April 3, 1991
2	"We are the Earth Defense Class"	April 10, 1991
3	"Test is how big an annoyance!?"	April 17, 1991
4	"Protect the field of flowers!"	April 24, 1991
5	"Decision! Unrivaled dragon tail"	May 1, 1991
6	"Survive the traffic war!"	May 8, 1991
7	"Taking care of drunkard"	May 15, 1991
8	"Absolute union of friendship!"	May 22, 1991
9	"Blowing away moldy feelings"	May 29, 1991
10	"The town where gasoline vanished"	June 5, 1991
11	"Cookie's nightmare"	June 12, 1991
12	"The pool is too hot"	June 19, 1991
13	"Get back the baby!!"	June 26, 1991
14	"Final match! Baseball"	July 3, 1991
15	"Fly at Mach 9!"	July 10, 1991
16	"Crash course in returning the shot!"	July 17, 1991
17	"Teacher is a Jaaku beast!?"	July 24, 1991
18	"Presentation! Earth Defense Class' secrets"	July 31, 1991
19	"Seaside School is in chaos!!"	August 7, 1991
20	"Maria has disappeared!"	August 14, 1991
21	"The enemy is Raijin-Oh!?"	August 21, 1991
22	"Departure! The invincible warrior"	August 28, 1991
23	"Come forth! Absolutely Invincible Union!!"	September 4, 1991
24	"Dog/cat panic plan!"	September 11, 1991
25	"Getting the scoop!!"	September 18, 1991
26	"Great African battle!"	September 25, 1991
27	"Defeat the earthquake"	October 2, 1991
28	"Garuma's competition of fear!!"	October 9, 1991
29	"Appear! Super Jaaku beast"	October 16, 1991
30	"Jaaku beast is a friend?"	October 23, 1991
31	"Fierce battle! Channel war"	October 30, 1991
32	"Adventure in the haunted house"	November 6, 1991
33	"Terror! Dancing Jaaku beast"	November 13, 1991
34	"Skiing is too cold"	November 20, 1991
35	"Vanished Commander"	November 27, 1991
36	"Jaaku beast is an ally of justice!?"	December 4, 1991
37	"Graffiti revolt"	December 11, 1991
38	"Psychic Jin"	December 18, 1991
39	"The celebration is a troubling thing"	December 25, 1991
40	"Belzeb's great approach"	January 8, 1992
41	"Kidnapping of the absolutely invincible"	January 15, 1992
42	"Protect the secret of the school!"	January 22, 1992
43	"Super Giant Reiko Appears!"	January 29, 1992
44	"Decisive micro-battle!"	February 5, 1992
45	"Broadcast! Earth Defense Class facts!!"	February 12, 1992
46	"Taida becomes an Earthling"	February 19, 1992
47	"Adult to child chaos!?"	February 26, 1992
48	"Transformation! Black Taida"	March 4, 1992
44	"Appear! Jaaku Empire"	March 11, 1992
50	"Defeat Emperor Warza!"	March 18, 1992
51	"Our dream is absolutely invincible!"	March 25, 1992

== OVA List ==
OVA number	Title	Original release date
1	"5 Nen 3 Kum 3 Memorial Page! (Room 5 Class 3?)"	August 26, 1992
2	"Epic War for First Love!"	September 30, 1992
3	"Story of the Nobori Castle Robot of Light Daydream"	December 16, 1992
4	"Everyone is the Earth Defense Class"	February 24, 1993

== Game appearances ==
The series first appeared on Sunrise Eiyuutan for the Dreamcast. Later on, it was included on Super Robot Wars GC for the GameCube and again in Super Robot Wars XO for the Xbox 360.

Raijin-Oh is again included as an entry in the Super Robot Wars series of video games, beginning with Super Robot Wars NEO for the Wii along with the other 3 Eldran robots.

It also appeared in New Century Brave Wars on the PlayStation 2 in Japan to establish the first official connection between the Eldran and Yuusha series, following the merger of Takara and Tomy.

It would later appear as one of the various Sunrise animated robots as a playable character in the RPG Battle of Sunrise, to celebrate the studio's 30th anniversary, released on the PlayStation 2.

There also exists a Game Boy fighting game published by Tomy in 1991, which has been translated into English through a fan-made patch.

Raijin-Oh, once again, is included in the Super Robot Wars series in Super Robot Wars OE and Super Robot Wars BX. BX is notable to be the first time Raijin-Oh appeared in a 2D Super Robot Wars game.

== External links and references ==
- Eldran's official website (Japanese)
- Sunrise's introduction page(Japanese)
- Matchless Raijin-Oh (anime) at Anime News Network's encyclopedia
- foxdragon's introduction page

Preceded by —	Matchless Raijin-Oh; 1991–1992	Succeeded by Genki Bakuhatsu Ganbaruger
