= Genki Bakuhatsu Ganbaruger =

Japanese anime television series

- 元気爆発ガンバルガー
- Genre: Adventure, Mecha, Comedy, Henshin Hero, Magical Boy
- Created by: Hajime Yatate
- Developed by: Kenichi Kanemaki
- Directed by: Toshifumi Kawase
- Music by: Tomoki Hasegawa
- Country of origin: Japan
- Original language: Japanese
- No. of episodes: 47

Production
- Producers: Tomoyuki Ikeda (TV Tokyo); Toshihiko Fujinami (Yomiko); Kenji Uchida (Sunrise)
- Production companies: TV Tokyo; Yomiko Advertising; Sunrise

Original release
- Network: TXN (TV Tokyo)
- Release: April 1, 1992 – February 24, 1993

Genki Bakuhatsu Ganbaruger (元気爆発ガンバルガー, Genki Bakuhatsu Ganbarugā; lit. "Energetic Explosion Ganbaruger" also known by the dub name Energy Bomb and Rocket Kidz) is a 47 episode animated shōnen mecha television series, and the second generation Eldran franchise funded by Tomy right after Matchless Raijin-Oh and produced by Sunrise. It aired on TV Tokyo from April 1, 1992, to February 24, 1993, and it is succeeded by the third generation of the Eldran series Nekketsu Saikyō Go-Saurer. The series takes a year after the events of Matchless Raijin-Oh and it was the first season to introduce helmets, signature colors and signature vehicles as well as another additional auxiliary robot and a super robot formed by three robots.

== Plot ==
Ever since God Raijin-Oh had defeated the Evil Empire, peace has returned to Hinobori. In Aozora City (a neighboring town to Hinobori City where Jin and his friends lived), Toubei is trying to train his son Kotaro in the art of the ninja, but a bomb accidentally releases Gokuark, a great demon king of The Demon World (大魔界, Daimakai) that Eldran had been keeping contained. Eldran manages to contain him, but one of his servants manages to escape as well, and now attempts to free his master.

Eldran grants Raijin-oh's (mainly Ken-Oh, Hou-Oh, Juu-Oh) three new successor mechas named Go Tiger, King Elephant, and Mach Eagle to Kotaro and his two friends, Yosuke and Rikiya, as well as pilot suits that grant each of them a superpower. However, there are also cursed and each of them can turn into a dog when their identity is known to others by a dark wizard, Yaminorius III. Later in the series, Bakuryuu-Oh's successor auxiliary mechas, Revolger and Gekiryuger appear and all form into God Raijin-Oh's successor super robot, Great Ganbaruger.

Unless Yaminorius, the Demon Lords and the evil monsters Devil Beasts (魔界獣, Makai jyuu) must be defeated, the second generation of the Eldran pilots and the Earth Defense Class' successor, Miracle Ninja Ganbar Team (ミラクル忍者ガンバーチーム, Mirakuru Ninja Ganbaa Chiimu) must keep their identities until Nekketsu Saikyou Gosaurer's debut a year later while Kotaro's father; Toubee has been turned into a dog by the curse and the Earth Defense Class and Raijin-Oh deals with Gokudo and Jaku Lucifer, from the 5th dimension.

== Characters ==
=== Ganbar Team (ガンバーチーム, Ganbaa Chiimu) ===
Ganbar Team and Gon

Kotaro Kirigakure (霧隠 虎太郎, Kirigakure Kotarou)

Voiced by: Ai Orikasa

Kotaro Kirigakure is the son of a kindergarten principal and a ninja and is also a fourth grader in Aozora Elementary who has a great sense of ability and is thoughtful as well as being the second generation Eldran pilot. He is being trained as a ninja by his father Toubei but he often skips it well. As Yellow Ganbar (イエローガンバー, Ieroo Ganbaa) with Ganbare Suit, he gains super-speed. His "Ride On" vehicle is the Ganbar Bike, a tiger-motif motorcycle, and he pilots Go Tiger, as well as being the main pilot of Ganbaruger and Great Ganbaruger. Kotaro puts his favorite sweet; banana daifuku ahead of his transformation item, abusing his own superpowers in the last episode. Unlike his predecessor Jin and later his successor Kenichi, he is a naughty juvenile delinquent who always pranks Aozora's population for the fun of it which leads to everyone into keeping on hating him even more and more and his mischievousness still never ends for his whole life even in his maturity. He's the one resident in Aozora in which everybody hates him the most.

Yousuke Kazamatsuri (風祭 鷹介, Kazamatsuri Yousuke)

Voiced by: Omi Minami

Yousuke Kazamatsuri is the geek/nerd of the group, a shy, sometimes unexpected-acting, curious boy who is troubled by his grade-conscious mother, and crush on Yurika, do anything for her. As Blue Ganbar (ブルーガンバー, Buruu Ganbaa), he is the first to discover their superpowers in the Ganbare Suits, which in his case is super-senses. He flies the Ganbare Jet (which is actually a prop-driven plane) and Mach Eagle. After he protects the egg containing it, he becomes the pilot of Gekiryuger as well.

Rikiya Ryuzaki (流崎 力哉, Ryuuzaki Rikiya)

Voiced by: Bin Shimada

Rikiya Ryuzaki is a caring, diligent, loving brother and hard worker who wants to become a professional baseball player. He has the most sense of duty in Gambar team, getting angry with Kotaro's sloppiness. As Red Ganbar (レッドガンバー, Reddo Ganbaa), Rikiya Ryuzaki gains super-strength. His vehicle is the Ganbar Buggy, which looks like a red go-cart, and like the other two vehicles become part of the cockpit for his mech, in this case, King Elephant. He is the son of the owner of the ramen restaurant. When anyone needs more help, he ends up becoming the pilot of Revolger as well.

=== Friends and Allies ===
Toubei Kirigakure (霧隠 藤兵衛, Kirigakure Toubei) (Gonzales)

Voiced by: Kenichi Ogata

Kotaro's father. Toubei is a great ninja who is ninja dojo's master but has no pupils, However, early on Yaminorius turns him into a dog when he attempts to battle him, a form he stays in for most of the rest of the series, called Gonzales (ゴンザレス, Gonzaresu), or Gon for short. Under his doghouse is a secret ninja training chamber. Eventually, he is returned to human form in time for the final battle. He had disguised as "Shinobi Ganbar" once, and destroyed Devil Beast as a main pilot of Ganbaruger, Great Ganbaruger instead of Kotaro.

Kasumi Kirigakure (霧隠 かすみ, Kirigakure Kasumi)

Voiced by: Miki Ito

Kotaro's older sister. Kasumi is a strong-willed, sense of justice, unyielding 2nd year student in Aozora Junior High who is an ace player of badminton club, whom she often fights and argues with the juvenile Kotaro. In episode 33, Kasumi was (accidentally) turned into an evil wizard, Kasumirius by the Yaminorius's evil magic once and defeated Yaminorius and fights with Ganbaruger in which she was defeated by the latter and returns to normal.

Yayoi Kirigakure (霧隠 やよい, Kirigakure Yayoi)

Voiced by: Rika Fukami

Kotaro and Kasumi's mother. Yayoi is a laid-back, gentle principal in Aozora Kindergarten that has been managed, Yayoi and Kasumi believe Toubei went to the training of ninja.

Aiko Tachibana (立花 亜衣子, Tachibana Aiko)

Voiced by: Miki Ito

The homeroom teacher of the 4–1 class in Aozora Elementary. Ms. Aiko is a strict teacher but is gentle and loves students, and is a judo master, can fling even a thugs and Makai Beast. On the later, Ms. Aiko fell in love with Mr. Yamino, Yaminorius's human form when he lost memories, she was deeply shocked when his true identity was revealed. However, she decided to make Yaminorius good, to begin persuade Yaminorius with a megaphone to make good him when Yaminorius and Demon Beasts appears.

Chinatsu Yuuki (結城 千夏, Yuuki Chinatsu)

Voiced by: Yuri Shiratori

Kotaro's counterpart and the school newspaper's photographer, Chinatsu wants to be a journalist, is always raving about finding the next "Great Scoop" even though she is only a 4th year elementary student like the Ganbar guys. Chinatsu is a childhood friend of Kotaro and always quarrels with him, but she's Yellow Ganbar's fan since being saved by him.

Yurika Komaki (小牧 百合香, Komaki Yurika)

Voiced by: Ikue Otani

Yousuke's counterpart. Yurika is a quiet, serious and ladylike, her home is a hospital, and also has violin lessons with him despite Yousuke's failed attempts at violin. Yurika has romantic feelings to Blue Ganbar since being saved by him.

Katsura Takeda (武田 桂, Takeda Katsura)

Voiced by: Rika Fukami

Rikiya's counterpart and the daughter of Defense Force's General Takeda. Katsura is a stubborn, prim, fangirl, and class committee members same with Rikiya. Katsura had hated Ganbar Team, but get soft a little by little since being saved by Red Ganbar. In Nekketsu Saikyo Gosaurer, she appears in a cameo with her father in the Takeda residence.

Tetsuya Ryuzaki (流﨑 哲哉, Ryuuzaki Tetsuya)

Voiced by: Ikue Otani

Rikiya's little brother who is in Aozora Kindergarten and always acted with Akie. Tetsuya respects Rikiya but saying Red Ganbar is cooler than his brother since he saved by him, discouraging Rikiya.

Akie Yuuki (結城 秋絵, Yuuki Akie)

Voiced by: Rika Fukami

Chinatsu's little sister. Akie wants to be a journalist like her sister, and more reckless than her sister. Akie had combining the Great Ganbaruger only once.

Jun Araki (荒木 純, Araki Jun)

Voiced by: Ken Yamaguchi

The coach of the Little League Baseball team. He is a student who had failed the entrance exam. Jun has a crush on Aiko Tachibana, had disguised as "White Ganbar" and saved Aiko from Makai Beast. However, he has a broken heart.

Genzo Araki (荒木 源蔵, Araki Genzou)

Voiced by: Kenichi Ogata

Father of Coach Jun, Genzo is an owner of mom-and-pop candy store that suffer with Makai Beast well.

General Takeda (武田長官, Takeda-Choukan)

Voiced by: Tomomichi Nishimura

The general of the Defence Force. It seems as if the reason he does not show up as much in Matchless Raijin-Oh is because he was busy over in Aozora City with his daughter and Makaijuu (Hellbeast) attacks. He later returns in Nekketsu Saikyo Gosaurer, when the Saurers are dealing with the Mechanization Empire who attempt to mechanize the Earth with the forces of the Four Great Machine Kings and Kikaishin himself.

Eldran (エルドラン, Erudoran)

Voiced by: Bin Shimada

The guardian of the light of earth who gives out Raijin-Oh to Jin Hyuga and the Earth Defense Class one year prior. Now, he has entrusted Ganbaruger to the Ganba Team and sealed Gokuark once again. Eldran has sealed Gokuark at 400 years ago prior to Raijin-Oh's appearance and the formation of the Earth Defense Class as well as the other robots' appearances, and now, he has been fighting against Gokuark but the result is that he had transformed into a white dragon at demon world due to a powerful, evil curse. Later, he would entrust the third Eldran Robo Gosaurer to Kenichi Minezaki and the Saurers as he was fighting the Mechanization Empire in the dinosaur era and the fourth, Daiteioh to Tarou Oomomo and the Dankettsu Team when the Onigashima attacks Earth.

=== The Demon World (大魔界, Daimakai) ===
Yaminorius III (ヤミノリウスIII世, Yaminoriusu Sansei)

Voiced by: Kazuyuki Sogabe

Dark sorcerer and servant of Gokurark, also a kind of Demon Beasts. although Gokurark fails his first escape attempt, he slips Yaminorius out to work on freeing him. Yaminorius swears fidelity to demon world, and has greatest magic power but it's spoiled by his blunder and goofy personality. Possessed in a human skeleton model of Aozora Elementary's science prep room usually, will materialize with preparation room's equipments, and put on his head a flask filled with water that's same ingredients with devil world's atmosphere. His human form is young journalist Kyouji Yamino (闇野 響史, Yamino Kyouji) aka Mr. Yamino mainly. After his master's defeat (since he attacked his master falsely), embeds Gokuark's soul in himself, granting him more power and a slightly altered form. From this point on, until the other two demons free Gokuark from his body and restore Gokuark's power, he is able to convert pre-existing objects directly into Devil Beast. At the later, Yaminorius is loved by Ms. Aiko as human Mr. Yamino when lost memories; he showed own identity after a while, however, to shrink from Ms. Aiko to persuade to trying reform him always. Yaminorius succeeds in the revival of The Three Great Demons; in addition, he finally rebels and helps the Ganbar Team since Gokuaku began to destroy the earth; not rule it, and leaves somewhere after they defeated Three Kings. Yaminorius get away to somewhere, but returned as human Mr. Yamino to Ms. Aiko at ending.

==== Three Demon Kings (三大魔王, Sandai Maou) ====
Gokuark (ゴクアーク, Gokuaaku)

Voiced by: Masaharu Sato

The first of the three demon king of Demon World, originally sealed under a big rock in shrine at hill behind in Aozora City, so want to rules the entire universe. After his initial defeat by the Ganbar Team, he hides himself within Yaminorius, until his revived brothers pull him free once more.

Seiyark (サイアーク, Saiaaku)

Voiced by: Ken Yamaguchi

The second of the three demons. He had been sealed by the Christ the Redeemer statue in Rio de Janeiro, Brazil, until Yamino Ryuuse broke the master seal in Japan and freed him and Retsuark. Has control of Lightning.

Retsuark (レツアーク, Retsuaaku)

Voiced by: Bin Shimada

The last of the three demons. He had been sealed near the Great Pyramids of Giza until freed by the breaking of the combined seal in Japan. Has the power of demon summoning.

== Mechanics ==
=== Go Tiger (ゴウタイガー, Gou Taigaa) ===
- Specs
  - Animal Mode
    - Length: 20.8 meters
    - Weight: 18.2 tons
    - Top Speed: 1,180 kilometers per hour
    - Power Output: 78,000 metric horsepower (57,000 kW)
  - Fighter Mode
    - Height: 16.0 meters
    - Weight: 18.2 tons
    - Top Speed: 560 kilometers per hour
    - Power Output: 78,000 metric horsepower (57,000 kW)

The robot piloted by Yellow Ganbar, Kotaro. It typically launches from either underneath a park, or from a warehouse in a mall. In addition to its claws in beast mode, it has a pair of back cannons(Go Cannon), and fire breath that it only seems to use when executing the team attack Ganbar Ninpo with Mach Eagle and King Elephant. In robot mode, it wields the Go Saber. It forms the lower torso and upper legs of Ganbaruger.

=== King Elephant (キングエレファン, Kingu Erefan) ===
- Specs
  - Animal Mode
    - Length: 17.8 meters
    - Weight: 27.9 tons
    - Top Speed: 380 kilometers per hour
    - Power Output: 98,000 metric horsepower (72,000 kW)
  - Fighter Mode
    - Height: 15.6 meters
    - Weight: 35.5 tons
    - Top Speed: 470 kilometers per hour
    - Power Output: 98,000 metric horsepower (72,000 kW)

This is Rikiya/Red Ganbar's vehicle. Its main launch points are under an apartment building and under a highway overpass. It has the King Missile in its trunk in beast mode, besides crushing things with its feet, and using its tusks. In robot mode it uses the King Tomahawk. It forms the legs from the knees down of Ganbaruger.

=== Mach Eagle (マッハイーグル, Mahha Iiguru) ===
- Specs
  - Animal Mode
    - Length: 21.5 meters
    - Weight: 16.8 tons
    - Ground Movement Speed: 120 kilometers per hour
    - Top Flying Speed: Mach 9.4
    - Power Output: 58,000 metric horsepower (43,000 kW)
  - Fighter Mode
    - Height: 16.5 meters
    - Weight: 16.8 tons
    - Top Speed: 620 kilometers per hour
    - Power Output: 58,000 metric horsepower (43,000 kW)

The third of the original Ganbare Team robots, controlled by Yousuke aka Blue Ganbar. It can launch from either an intersection, or from under a toll road, just past the toll booths. In beast mode it has vulcans on the wings, and can twirl to create a tornado (Mach Cyclone), which is one of the parts of the Ganbar Ninpo team attack. In robot mode, it fires the Mach Arrow. It forms the arms, wings and chest of Ganbaruger.

=== Ganbaruger (ガンバルガー, Ganbarugaa) ===
- Specs
  - Height: 28.4 meters
  - Weight: 65.7 tons
  - Ground Movement Speed: 1,880 kilometers per hour
  - Top Flying Speed: Mach 12.5
  - Power Output: 380,000 metric horsepower (280,000 kW)

Raijin-oh's successor robot. When Koutaro activates the sequence for "Miracle Combine (ミラクル合体, Mirakuru Gattai)" the three above robots combine into Ganbaruger. Its attacks are:

- Ganbar Fire
  A stream of fire from the tiger head on the chest
- Ganbar Flare
  It is the same as above, but a single ball of fire
- Ganbar Missile
  It fires a missile form the trunk on the shield
- Ganbar Slugger
  It throws an energy boomerang created from the mohawk on the head
- Ganbar Flasher
  Two balls of light come flying from its sides(from the shoulders perhaps) and disintegrate the part of the Makaijuu they hit(arms both times it was used)
- Ganbar Sword
  It summons the Ganbare Sword
- Ganbar Final Attack
  The finisher. Energy bands launch from the tusks of the shield, holding the enemy in place while the Ganba sword is drawn out of the ground, after which it ignites. Ganbaruger then jets forward and cuts the Makaijuu into quarters, and after it explodes, extinguishes the sword with the shield's tusks.

=== Revolger (リボルガー, Riborugaa) ===
- Specs
  - Animal Mode
    - Length: 29.9 meters
    - Weight: 56.4 tons
    - Ground Movement Speed: 2,480 kilometers per hour
    - Top Flying Speed: Mach 10.2
    - Power Output: 320,000 metric horsepower (240,000 kW)
  - Fighter Mode
    - Height: 25.6 meters
    - Weight: 47.8 tons
    - Top Speed: 1,540 kilometers per hour
    - Power Output: 320,000 metric horsepower (240,000 kW)

The first of the two reinforcements. Its transforming command is "Miracle Change (ミラクル変形, Mirackuru Henkei)", as opposed to the "Miracle Change" of the previous robots(although later on they do use Miracle Change for it a few times). Its pilot is Red Ganbare, and the cockpit is close to what Rikiya is used to in King Elephant. It launches from underneath a railroad crossing. In beast mode it can use its claws and teeth to attack, as well as fire shots form the tail, and in robot mode it has:

- Head Bomber
  It fires shots from the "revolver" in the head
- Shot Blaster
  It fires blasts from its rifle

=== RevolBuster (リボルバスター, Riborubasutaa) ===
The gun mode. When the command "Miracle Bussou"is given, it transforms into a huge double-barrel gun. This mode is called the RevolBuster, and used for the finisher RevolBuster Last Fire.

=== Gekiryuger (ゲキリュウガー, Gekiryuugaa) ===
- Specs
  - Animal Mode
    - Length: 24.8 meters
    - Weight: 94.9 tons
    - Ground Movement Speed: 240 kilometers per hour
    - Top Flying Speed: Mach 15.4
    - Power Output: 430,000 metric horsepower (320,000 kW)
  - Fighter Mode
    - Height: 27.8 meters
    - Weight: 60.8 tons
    - Ground Movement Speed: 1,940 kilometers per hour
    - Top Flying Speed: Mach 15.4
    - Power Output: 430,000 metric horsepower (320,000 kW)

Gekiryuger is the last of the reinforcements, granted to Yuusuke. Besides its natural weapons it can fire shots from the tailguns(Back Shot) and duplicate the tornado that Mach Eagle creates(Gekiryu Hurricane). After it transforms with Miracle Henkei(and also Change later):

- Dragon Shot
  It summons and fires shots from its handheld rifle
- Gekiryu Cannon
  The first part of the major attack(and sometimes finisher). It summons two over-the-shoulder cannons and starts charging an energy blast between them.
- Dragon Thunder Crash
  The second part of the major attack. It launches the generated plasma ball at the enemy with a blast from the dragon head on the chest.
- There is also a nameless energy boomerang launched from the head crest.
- It can also join hands with Revolger and Ganbaruger for a team attack and part-time finisher called Ultra Ganbare Ninpo. They become a wheel of flame and roll through the enemy.

=== Great Ganbaruger (グレートガンバルガー, Gureeto Ganbarugaa) ===
- Specs
  - Height: 43.8 meters
  - Weight: 168.5 tons
  - Ground Movement Speed: 3,800 kilometers per hour
  - Top Flying Speed: Mach 32
  - Power Output: 1,600,000 metric horsepower (1,200,000 kW)

The final form. The main torso is Ganbaruger, though Revolger adds onto it, and forms the head, and lower arms at least. Gekiryuger becomes the legs, and wings. Its attacks are:

- Ganbar Breast Flash
  It fires an energy blast shaped like the symbol on its chest from its chest at the enemy.
- Final Ganbar Sword
  It summons the sword from a pillar of light between earth and sky. Note: It seems as if it can barely handle the weight of the sword!
- Great Final Attack
  The finishing move, firing an electric blast form the sword to immobilize the enemy, then jet forward and slash it in half.
- It can also swap the hand for a cannon and fire in a nameless attack.

== List of episodes ==
Original airdate	Episode number	Title
April 1, 1992	1	Robots Pending! (ロボットみ〜っけ!)
April 8, 1992	2	Great Discovery of Superpowers! (超能力を大はっけん!)
April 15, 1992	3	Our secret will be discovered! (秘密がばれちゃう〜!)
April 22, 1992	4	Duel! Violin battle (決闘!バイオリン合戦)
April 29, 1992	5	The cake ran away!? (ケーキが逃げた!?)
May 6, 1992	6	Flying teacher home-visit (とんでとんで家庭訪問)
May 13, 1992	7	The city turns a sandbox! (町が砂場に大変身!)
May 20, 1992	8	Crisis! Ganbaruger (ピンチ！ガンバルガー)
May 27, 1992	9	Superpowered miracle baseball (超能力でミラクル野球)
June 3, 1992	10	Squid and octopus brothers' visit! (イカタコ兄弟参上！)
June 10, 1992	11	Yosuke is Bzzt Human! (鷹介はビリビリ人間！！)
June 17, 1992	12	Aosora City is starting to walk around (青空町が歩き出す！？)
June 24, 1992	13	The password is ribbit (合言葉はケ～ロケロ)
July 1, 1992	14	Hell-whale flies through the air (魔界クジラが空を飛ぶ)
July 8, 1992	15	Come Forth! Revolger (出てこい！リボルガー)
July 15, 1992	16	Rikiya vs Ganbaruger (力哉対ガンバルガー)
July 22, 1992	17	Terror! Demon's trap holls (恐怖！魔界の落とし穴)
July 29, 1992	18	A dare to demon world (ドッキリ魔界肝だめし)
August 5, 1992	19	Run! Ramen reversal (走れ！逆転ラーメン)
August 12, 1992	20	That banana's great battle(そんなバナナ大決戦)
August 19, 1992	21	Gokuark's revival!(ゴクアーク復活！)
August 26, 1992	22	Birth! Gekiryuger(誕生！ゲキリュウガー)
September 2, 1992	23	Close call great combination(ききいっぱつの大合体)
September 9, 1992	24	Clash! Manga panic(激突！まんがパニック)
September 16, 1992	25	Surprise! Invisible Man(ビックリ！透明人間)
September 23, 1992	26	Devil Beast is a cook!(魔界獣はコックさん！)
September 30, 1992	27	Appear! Shinobi Ganbar(出た！シノビガンバー)
October 7, 1992	28	Troubled miracle athletic meet(大荒れミラクル運動会)
October 14, 1992	29	Magnetic-attractking!(磁石でクッツキング！)
October 21, 1992	30	Universe-sized great struggle!(宇宙サイズで大暴れ！)
October 28, 1992	31	Time travel: Aozora City(タイムスリップ青空町)
November 4, 1992	32	Airy balloon bus(風船バスでフ～ワフワ)
November 11, 1992	33	Kasumi vs Ganbaruger(かすみ対ガンバルガー)
November 18, 1992	34	Hell is mystified!? School play(魔界キッカイ！？学芸会)
November 25, 1992	35	Persevere! Catering alone(がんばれ！出前一人旅)
December 2, 1992	36	Koutaro're a lot!?(虎太郎がいっぱい)
December 9, 1992	37	Dead heat with a kotatsu(こたつでデッドヒート)
December 16, 1992	38	Justice's Yaminorius!?(正義のヤミノリウス！？)
December 23, 1992	39	Santa is the city's great robber!(サンタは町の大泥棒！)
January 6, 1993	40	The hero hates mochi!?(ヒーローはモチ嫌い！？)
January 13, 1993	41	My beloved person is the sorcerer(愛した人は魔法使い)
January 20, 1993	42	Surprise tough enemy! Great magician(驚き強敵！大マジック)
January 27, 1993	43	Perfect date plan(完全無欠のデート計画)
February 3, 1993	44	Daimakai's great secret!(大魔界の大秘密！)
February 10, 1993	45	Three devil kings, reborn!(三大魔王、大復活！)
February 17, 1993	46	We are a life-force explosion!(おれたちは元気爆発！)
February 24, 1993	47	Final last great decisive battle!(最終最後の大決戦！)

== Translation ==
This series was dubbed into English and was part of Cartoon Network's lineup in the Philippines. The only commercially available release of this English dub is a licensed set of four VCD boxsets which include the original Japanese track as well.

== Game appearances ==
Ganbaruger appeared in the Super Robot Wars video game series by Bandai Namco and Banpresto, starting with Super Robot Wars NEO for the Wii, along with the other 3 Eldran robots.

Preceded by Matchless Raijin-Oh	Genki Bakuhatsu Ganbaruger; 1992–1993	Succeeded by Nekketsu Saikyo Go-Saurer
