= Kanzen Shouri Daiteioh =

Japanese media franchise

完全勝利ダイテイオー (Kanzen Shōri Daiteiō)
- Genre: Mecha; School; Adventure
- Manga
- Published by: ASCII Media Works
- Magazine: Dengeki Hobby Magazine
- Original video animation
- Directed by: Akira Yoshimura
- Produced by: Chieo Ohashi; Koutaro Nakayama
- Studio: Sunrise
- Released: December 21, 2001
- Episodes: 1

Kanzen Shouri Daiteioh (完全勝利ダイテイオー, Kanzen Shōri Daiteiō; lit. Perfect Victory Daiteioh) is a Japanese media series and the fourth and final installment of the Eldran series, created by Sunrise. The series was co-created and funded by Dengeki Hobby Magazine. It introduces hats for the pilots and it is the first to feature more than 18 children in a classroom, which in this case, 19.

== Plot ==
A year after the defeat of the Kikaika's boss Kikaijin, Eldran, the spirit of the Earth is guarding the planet from villain organizations originating from space or other dimensions. Eldran gives several groups of kids special mechas which lets them protect the Earth for years. This peaceful time suddenly changed when a new evil organization known as the Onigashima attacked Earth. The Earth Defense Force, now in the 2nd year of middle school, the sixth grade Ganba Team and the middle school Saurers rush to the attack and start fighting. However, the Onigashima manage to easily defeat the Eldran Robots with the pilots inside, turning them into a giant golden sword. The golden sword appears from the sky and transforms the Gokuraku Elementary School into a base for Daiteioh.

Tarou Oomomo is a brash 5th grader of Class 5-3 along with Kakeru and Mai. The three students accept Eldran's mission. With Asuka's cousin, Hiryu, they fight side by side. With their battleship, the Gokuracruiser, the Dankettsu Team children from Class 5-3 are ready to help Jin and the others to fight the Onigashima.

== Characters ==
Tarou Oomomo (大桃タロウ, Ōmomo Tarō)
Voiced by: Yuuko Sanpei

A fifth grader who is the leader of the Dankettsu Team and pilot of Teioh, Daiteioh and Perfect Daiteioh. He is sometimes called "Momotaro" by his classmates. He is a brash young boy who is obsessed with the Ganba Team and is devoted to training with his broom likened to the Ganba Sword. After his encounter with the Onigashima and meeting Eldran, he pledged to protect the Earth against their threat. He also created Dentarun Ag out of his fear of the dentist. He shared his name with Taro Shirogane from the Saurers, which makes it common for Eldran pilots to share names.

Mai Oozora (大空マイ, Ōzora Mai)
Voiced by: Fumie Mizusawa

The second member of the Dankettsu Team, class president of Class 5-3 and the pilot of Kuuoh. Mai is the only female member of the team. She is liked by everyone despite her realist views. She admires the Earth Defense Team and was part of the group five years ago.

Kakeru Daichi (大地カケル, Daichi Kakeru)
Voiced by: Hiroyuki Yoshino

The third member of the Dankettsu Team and the pilot of Rikuoh. He has conflicts with Momotaro at some points because of his admiration of the Ganba Team. He admires the Saurers and is good at sports.

Hiryu Tsukishiro (月城ヒリュウ, Tsukishiro Hiryu)
Voiced by: Eri Miyajima

The fourth member of the Dankettsu Team and the pilot of both the Ryuoh and Dairyuoh. He is a transfer student and Asuka's cousin. He is calm, but did not participate in the team's actions until he acquired his own unit. He is the first Eldran pilot who transferred from another school.

== Development ==
During 2001, Sunrise worked with Dengeki Hobby Magazine on creating a new Eldran series for its 10th anniversary celebration by supplying them with the story board and images. Considered a one-shot series, it was originally adapted into a manga before an OVA is animated. Almost 8 years after the pilot episode aired, Daiteioh was included in Namco-Bandai and Banpresto's Super Robot Wars NEO. Sunrise and Starchild Records released a high definition remastered version of the original short video of the series with newly recorded voices, bundled in the Eldran Series Blu-ray Box.

Preceded by Nekketsu Saikyō Go-Saurer	Kanzen Shouri Daiteioh; 2001	Succeeded by None
