= Nekketsu Saikyō Go-Saurer =

Japanese anime television series

- 熱血最強ゴウザウラー
- Genre: Adventure, Mecha, School
- Created by: Hajime Yatate
- Directed by: Toshifumi Kawase
- Music by: Tomoki Hasegawa
- Country of origin: Japan
- Original language: Japanese
- No. of episodes: 51

Production
- Producers: Tomoyuki Ikeda (TV Tokyo); Keisuke Iwata (TV Tokyo); Toshihiko Fujinami (Yomiko); Kenji Uchida (Sunrise); Koji Takamori (Sunrise)
- Production companies: TV Tokyo; Yomiko Advertising; Sunrise

Original release
- Network: TXN (TV Tokyo)
- Release: March 3, 1993 – February 23, 1994

Matcheless Passion Go-Saurer (Japanese: 熱血最強ゴウザウラー, Hepburn: Nekketsu Saikyō Gōzaurā; Hot-Blooded Strongest Go-Saurer) is a 51-episode animated television series, and third generation Eldran franchise funded by Tomy after Genki Bakuhatsu Ganbaruger and produced by Sunrise. It aired in Japan from March 3, 1993, to February 23, 1994. The story for this entry is that a group of elementary school children are given command of the series' title mecha and their efforts to defend the Earth from the hands of the Mechanization Empire (Named the "Machine Empire" in the Filipino dubbed version) which was led by Kikaishin, the boss of this organization himself. It firstly introduces a female pilot, additional pilots who pilot auxiliary mecha and jet mode. In addition, it is the first season to start with four pilots, having all members having the same bracelet and introduce a super robot piloted by multiple pilots.

== Plot ==
A year has passed after the Three Great Demons are successfully defeated by Great Ganbaruger as well as Gokudo being defeated by God Raijin-oh and Jaku Satan. Jin Hyuga and the Earth Defense Class are now in the first year of middle school, and Kotaro and the members of the Ganba Team are now in the fifth grade of Aozora Elementary. But it is not long that a month has passed when the Mechanization Empire invades the Solar System in space, and in a matter of moments they take over and convert Neptune, Uranus, Saturn, Jupiter and Mars into mechanical forms, and now, the next planet they seek to mechanize is Earth. However, Earth's only ancient protector and soldier of light, Eldran, stands in their progress. To fight this new menace he gives the third generation of Eldran pilots – Kenichi Minezaki, Hiromi Tachibana and Shinobu Asaoka – a dinosaur-themed mecha each:

- Kenichi Minezaki: Mach Ptera
- Hiromi Tachibana: Land Stego
- Shinobu Asaoka: Thunder Brachio

...the three components of the series' title protagonist mecha, Gosaurer. Eventually, as this entry progresses, two auxiliary mecha – each assigned a pilot – later appear:

- Magna Tyranno, piloted by Taro Shirogane
- Grantops, piloted by Youji Hiyama

== Characters ==
=== Saurers (ザウラーズ, Zauraazu) ===
Kenichi Minezaki (峯崎 拳一, Minezaki Kenichi)

- Grade: 6
- Pilot of: Mach Ptera

Voiced by: Urara Takano

Kenichi Minezaki is the sixth-grade pilot of Mach Ptera and main pilot of Gosaurer. His parents run a sports store named "Minezaki Sports". He is an active and cheerful boy who likes to skateboard and is good at sports, but like his two Eldran predecessors, he is having academic problem issues. He is friends with Saneyasu and Kazutaka with whom he always plays soccer. However, he is the most annoying troublemaker who always causes lots of fights with Shinobu, Goro, Taro, or anyone else in school. He dreamed that a giant gear crashed onto his home which converted him very strangely after Great Ganbaruger saved Earth months prior. It was at this very one time that he was cursed by the Mechanical Empire into a mechanical cyborg for a few days temporarily for some time, but after a brief and bruised battle with the combined lifeforces and powers of the Four Great Machine Kings' new forme, the Machine Great King, he almost died and did return to being his human self with General Takeda's Matter Restoration Device, made by the Defense Force. After a harsher battle between themselves and the Emperor, the most powerful Kikaishin, he graduated from Harukaze Elementary along with the Saurers.

Hiromi Tachibana (立花 浩美, Tachibana Hiromi)

Voiced by: Megumi Hayashibara

- Grade: 6
- Pilot of: Land Stego

Hiromi Tachibana is the pilot of Land Stego who has a hobby for writing and drawing manga. His mother's name is Sayoko Tachibana, a klutzy doctor. His father is never revealed in this series and it could be possible he married Sayoko before Hiromi himself was born. It is revealed that he is good at cooking and it is believed that he has feelings for Kumiko Tanabe, whom he stalks as a subject for his manga drawing.

Shinobu Asaoka (朝岡 しのぶ, Asaoka Shinobu)

Voiced by: Yuri Amano

- Grade: 6
- Pilot of: Thunder Brachio

The first female Eldran pilot who operates Thunder Brachio. A tomboyish sixth-grade girl who often argues with Kenichi. She is learning kendo, and often spars with her grandmother (who is also an arcade gamer). Like with the case of Hiromi, her father is also never seen in this series.

Goro Ishida (石田 五郎, Ishida Gorō)

Voiced by: Noriko Uemura

- Grade: 6
- Pilot of: Saurer Jet

The very angry sixth-grade class president of class 6-2 who has a serious demeanor and a very dangerous and explosive temper, which causes him to go on a rampage at school and cause lots of fights with Kenichi and/or anyone else. At this time, his behavior seems to be quite rougher than a child could have in his lifestyle. Once, he was absolutely mad and made Taro, Yoji and Kenichi return to their usual robots by piloting all three by himself due to the three piloting the wrong robots (which was the case when Taro pilots Gosaurer, Yoji pilots Magnasaurer and Kenichi pilots Gransaurer because of an argument and strategy). He is the pilot of Kenichi's, Hiromi's and Shinobu's mecha's special vehicle transportation formation, Saurer Jet. In addition, he is the artilleryman of Thunder Brachio and is in the command room in charge of weapons.

Taro Shirogane (白金 太郎, Shirogane Tarō)

Voiced by: Bin Shimada

- Pilot of: Magna Tyranno

Also nicknamed at times as "Kinta" (金太). The judo club member who is refined, yet aggressive and the toughest. He lost in the finals to the same opponent for three consecutive years in judo tournaments since he was in the fourth grade when Raijin-Oh was fighting the Jark Empire, but in the last tournament he participated in the fight for the Saurers despite being in the middle of a match. He has feelings for Yuka Mizuhara when he was practising judo everyday in life. Kinta is the pilot of the series' first piloted auxiliary, Magna Tyranno.

Yoji Hiyama (火山 洋二, Hiyama Yōji)

Voiced by: Akemi Shinohara

- Pilot of: Grantops

An indecisive nerd and teacher's pet, who is a real bookworm and the heir to the elite Hiyama clan, whom all have the same type of hairstyle and glasses. Personally, he has a crush on the Class 6-3's homeroom teacher, Yuri Yayoi. He is the pilot of the Boueigar that soon, on the same episode of its appearance, permanently becomes Grantops, the second piloted auxiliary of the series.

Erika Kozu (光主 エリカ, Kouzu Erika)

Voiced by: Megumi Hayashibara

Also known as "Erie". The leader of the Saurers. Her own Saurer Brace is equipped with a "scramble" command function that instantly triggers the transformation of the Saurers' classroom and most of the school into the command centre and the Saurer Jet, and occupies the main command seat in the command center. She has a big ego, which leads to situations like dragging the Saurers into a movie production to fulfill her dreams of becoming an idol.

Takako Kojima (小島 尊子, Kojima Takako)

Voiced by: Ikue Otani

The "Professor" of the Saurers. Not only did she help develop Boueigar (Gransaurer) but she also writes the program for King Gosaurer. She is usually poised, but lashes out when she can't handle enough. She thinks failure can sometimes lead to success. Strangely enough, the code looks like Basic, so that may have helped. She also was the one who first worked out the functions of Gosaurer. She is the Kojima family cousin of Tsutomu Kojima, Jin Hyuga's classmate.

Shuzo Osada (長田 秀三, Osada Shuuzou)

Voiced by: Yuri Amano

A boy who is very good with mechanical things. He helped with the design and construction of Boueigar. He seems to possibly be more than a friend with Takako, often helping her make stuff. His father seems to have some type of job involving into fixing cars.

Saneyasu Mushanokoji (武者小路 叉音泰, Mushanokouji Saneyasu)

Voiced by: Akemi Shinohara

Also known as "Bon". The second of the "terrible trio" with Kazutaka and Kenichi who wears a blue cap. He is tall for his age.

Kazutaka Seki (関 和孝, Seki Kazutaka)

Voiced by: Mika Yanata

The third member of Kenichi's trio known as "Chobi". He has a shaved head, a round bald spot on the right side, a low back and buck teeth, and wears a striped shirt and shorts. He is a short troublemaker who is good at soccer in school. He belongs to the soccer club and often has a ball in his hand. He also has a quick escape, and has been a decoy for the mechanical four heavenly kings along with Kenichi and Saneyasu.

Yuka Mizuhara (水原 結花, Mizuhara Yuka)

Voiced by: Ikue Otani

The first of the female trio. She is more of a crybaby than Kumiko and Harue. She was quite short for a 6th grader, and it looks like that she has some sort of relationship between her and Taro.

Kumiko Tanabe (田辺 久美子, Tanabe Kumiko)

Voiced by: Urara Takano

Also known as "Kuuko". The second of the female trio. She was once stalked by Hiromi as a subject for art, but when he gets hurt she gets around her feelings to treat him, and in fact seems to possibly care about him after that. The nurse, as such, among the kids.

Harue Yamamoto (山本 春枝, Yamamoto Harue)

Voiced by: Megumi Hayashibara

The third member of the female trio, her timidity seems to be expressed in her introversion. She is the tallest one in the class, and while Bon seemed to have a crush on her due to her wearing a red raincoat during a very rainy day and so, in the end it appeared to have amounted to nothing, plausibly leaving her as the only one of the three likely not to have a potential boyfriend.

Akemi Sato (佐藤 明美, Satou Akemi)

Voiced by: Akemi Shinohara

Also known as "One". The bright first-born of the Sato twins who talks a lot.

Harumi Sato (佐藤 晴美, Satou Harumi)

Voiced by: Mika Yanata

Also known as "Two". The second-born of the Sato twins.

Masao Fujiyoshi (藤吉 雅夫, Masao Fujiyoshi)

Voiced by: Sanshiro Nitta

Also known as "Mabo". An overeater. During the Saurers' stay in the dinosaurs' era, he ends up for a short while adopting a baby dinosaur which hatched from the egg he was about to eat. In the end he has to leave it behind along with the dinosaurs.

Ikuyo Oyama (大山 育代, Ooyama Ikuyo)

Voiced by: Noriko Uemura

A heavyset girl. She takes care of the class's pet, an iguana named Dai, and is kind to animals in general. She even rescued a stray cat named Miko who got caught inside Gosaurer when a battle began. When she graduates from Harukaze Elementary, she allows Dai to live with her from now onwards.

== Mecha ==
Unlike the previous Eldran series, both Gosaurer and Magnasaurer transform from the school itself, rather than launch under the base of school/street, which means the facilities in school are usable, but also means that the armour are extremely weak.

=== Gosaurer ===
==== Saurer Jet (ザウラージェット, Zaurā Jetto) ====
- Pilot: Goro

This form is a special transportation formation of Mach Ptera, Land Stego and Thunder Brachio when the mecha are launched. The only weapons in operation in this formation are the Thunder Cannons and Jet Vulcan which supply only basic defence. Once the Saurer Jet reaches its destination, Goro triggers the Jet's "Saurer Formation" procedure which disassembles the formation into the components – Saurer Jet has served its purpose each time.

- Specs
  - Length: 48.0 meters
  - Weight: 124.0 tons
  - Top Flying Speed: Mach 7
  - Power Output: 530,000 metric horsepower (390,000 kW)

==== Mach Ptera (マッハプテラ, Mahha Putera) ====
- Specs
  - Height: 34.1 meters
  - Weight: 38.0 tons
  - Ground Movement Speed: 120 kilometers per hour
  - Top Flying Speed: Mach 4.8
  - Power Output: 88,000 metric horsepower (65,000 kW)
- People aboard/operating
  - Pilot: Kenichi
  - Support crew:
    - Masao
    - Yuka
    - Ikuyo
    - Takako
    - Yoji (Upon the entry of Grantops, Yoji transfers from the support crew to pilot Grantops)

The first of Gosaurer's components, it is the only flight-capable component of the three. It mounts a pair of Gatling guns on the wings called the Brit Vulcans and a pair of slicing blades called the Ptera Slicers. It forms the arms and back (and therefore the wings) of Gosaurer.

==== Land Stego (ランドステゴ, Rando Sutego) ====
- Specs
  - Height: 34.5 meters
  - Length: 20.5 meters
  - Weight: 40.5 tons
  - Ground Movement Speed: 200 kilometers per hour
  - Top Hovering Speed: 580 kilometers per hour
  - Power Output: 106,000 metric horsepower (78,000 kW)
- People aboard/operating
  - Pilot: Hiromi
  - Support crew:
    - Saneyasu
    - Erika
    - Kumiko
    - Harue
    - Taro (Upon the entry of Magna Tyranno, Taro transfers from the support crew to pilot Magna Tyranno)

The second of Gosaurer's components, it can attack with spinning back plates called the Fin Cutters and with missile launchers on the sides of the head called the Stego Launchers. Its support crew is Saneyasu, Erika, Kumiko, Harue, and Taro, until Magnasaurer was found in a volcano. It becomes Gosaurer's main body.

==== Thunder Brachio (サンダーブラキオ, Sandā Burakio) ====
- Specs
  - Height: 58.8 meters
  - Length: 35.0 meters
  - Weight: 59.8 tons
  - Ground Movement Speed: 160 kilometers per hour
  - Top Hovering Speed: 460 kilometers per hour
  - Power Output: 270,000 metric horsepower (200,000 kW)
- People aboard/operating
  - Pilot: Shinobu
  - Support crew:
    - Kazutaka
    - Shuzo
    - The twins, Akemi and Harumi
    - Goro

The third of Gosaurer's components, its weapons are the mouth-equipped Brachio Needle gatling cannon and the back-equipped Thunder Cannons. It can also withdraw the legs into the body and ram with hover jets. It becomes Gosaurer's legs.

==== Gosaurer (ゴウザウラー, Gōzauraa) ====
- Specs
  - Height: 44.8 meters
  - Weight: 120.0 tons
  - Ground Movement Speed: 960 kilometers per hour
  - Top Flying Speed: Mach 5.6
  - Power Output: 530,000 metric horsepower (390,000 kW)

The Hot-blooded Combination (熱血合体, Nekketsu Gattai) of Mach Ptera, Land Stego and Thunder Brachio triggered by Kenichi's Saurer Changer's combination function being initiated. Each component's pilots move to the head-based cockpit, where Kenichi seems to be the main pilot. The components' command centers form a single command center in the middle of Gosaurer's chest.

Weapons and abilities

- Weapons
  - Saurer Cannon
    Thunder Brachio's Thunder Cannons are employed as leg-mounted cannons after Gosaurer's formation
  - Saurer Bunker
    Mach Ptera's feet serve as wrist-mounted lined launching claws after Gosaurer's formation, flipping away from view when not yet in use
  - Saurer Shield
    Land Stego's back butterflies open to serve as a shield
  - Saurer Blade
    Gosaurer's sword
- Abilities
  - Saurer Magma Finish
    Gosaurer's finishing attack. If the Saurer Blade is not summoned before Kenichi triggers this ability with his Saurer Changer's finisher activation function, the Saurer Blade is summoned during this attack
    - Saurer Hold
      A special energy beam fired by the Saurer Shield over the course of Gosaurer's finishing attack that 'suspends' the target in an energy suspension so that they cannot move, suspending them long enough for the finishing attack to be landed
  - Water Beam
    A chest-crystal-fired energy beam which, as its name symbolizes, enhances in strength and power when used underwater
  - Saurer Bomber
    A chest-crystal-formed crystal punched at the target
  - Spin Boomerang
    The Saurer Shield is used as a boomerang

=== Magna Tyranno (マグナティラノ, Maguna Tirano) ===
- Specs
  - Height: 62.5 meters
  - Weight: 100.0 tons
  - Ground Movement Speed: 380 kilometers per hour
  - Power Output: 470,000 metric horsepower (350,000 kW)
- Aboard
  - Pilot: Taro
- Weapons and abilities
  - Weapons
    - Tyranno Smasher
      A pair of torso-mounted laser cannons
  - Abilities
    - Tyranno Fire
      A breath blast of fire
    - Tyranno Smash
      A body ram attack

When the Saurer Jet's Saurer Formation procedure is triggered and Taro's mecha is combined with the Jet at this time, Taro's mecha reshapes into Magna Tyranno. Its attacks are simple: Tyranno Fire fires a blast of fire from its mouth, Tyranno Smasher is a pair of torso mounted laser cannons, and it bodily rams the enemy when performing Tyranno Smash.

==== Magnasaurer (マグナザウラー, Magunazauraa) ====
- Specs
  - Length: 42.6 meters
  - Weight: 98.0 tons
  - Ground Movement Speed: 820 kilometers per hour
  - Top Flying Speed: Mach 4.7
  - Power Output: 470,000 metric horsepower (350,000 kW)
- Weapons and abilities
  - Weapons
    - Magna Blade
      Magnasaurer's sword
    - Magna Cannon
      An arm-mounted cannon for each arm
  - Abilities
    - Magna Shot
      A blast from each Magna Cannon
    - Magna Bomber
      A chest-crystal-formed crystal is thrown at the enemy like an American football

The Hot-Blooded Evolution (熱血進化, Nekketsu Shinka) of Magna Tyranno into a robot form. Magnasaurer is the first robot to have white hands.

==== Magna Buster (マグナバスター, Maguna Basutaa) ====
A special Hot-Blooded Armament (熱血武装, Nekketsu Busō) transformation of Magnasaurer into a back-mounted firing weapon used by Gosaurer, instantly forming Buster Gosaurer (バスターゴウザウラー, Basutaa Gouzauraa) – this is phase 1 of Magnasaurer's finishing attack, Saurer Big Buster; for phase 2, Taro, upon the Magna Buster being charged to fire, locks his Saurer Changer into a special firing-weapon-similar interface which allows Taro to fire the blast (Note: this finishing attack can be fired even without combining with Gosaurer, but this has been done only once in the anime), firing a huge blast from the cannons. It also is this mode initially during launch, as a part of the Saurer Jet. When it is not engaging in battles, it was the part of the school which the stairs, as well as the cookery located. With the introduction of Magna Tyranno, the Saurer Jet, when being launched, is now formed as the Super Saurer Jet (スーパーザウラージェット, Suupaa Zauraa Jetto) where Magna Tyranno is called as the Magna Buster during transportation.

=== Grantops (グラントプス, Gurantopusu) ===
- Specs
  - Height: 70.5 meters
  - Weight: 162.0 tons
  - Ground Movement Speed: 280 kilometers per hour
  - Power Output: 680,000 metric horsepower (500,000 kW)
- Aboard
  - Pilot: Yoji
- Weapons and abilities
  - Weapons
    - Tricera Horn
      The horns are launched and are attached to wires
    - Tricera Launchers
      A collection of various missile-launching ports which fire their ammunition in a spread
  - Abilities
    - Tricera Arrow
      Energy blast from the Tricera Horns
    - Tricera Fire
      A breath blast of fire

Yoji Hiyama is the single pilot who controls all of the three forms. This is the Dinosaur mode of Gransaurer, and the initial mode it is gained in. It has several attacks in this mode:

==== Gran Jet (グランジェット, Guran Jetto) ====
- Specs
  - Length: 50.3 meters
  - Weight: 148.0 tons
  - Top Flying Speed: Mach 8.2
  - Power Output: 680,000 metric horsepower (500,000 kW)
- Weapons and abilities
  - *Weapons
    - Gran Launcher
      All missile ports available for use for this mode are fired in a spread
    - Gran Cannon
      4 cannons split as two pairs mounted on the hull mounted with each cannon close to each other

Grantops' transportation mode when launched.

==== Gransaurer (グランザウラー, Guranzauraa) ====
- Specs
  - Height: 43.5 meters
  - Weight: 148.0 tons
  - Ground Movement Speed: 880 kilometers per hour
  - Top Flying Speed: Mach 5.2
  - Power Output: 680,000 metric horsepower (500,000 kW)
- Weapons and abilities
  - Weapons
    - Gran Launcher
      The Tricera Lanchers/Gran Launchers used by Grantops/Gran Jet are usable in this form, used in a spread launch
    - Big Lancer
      Gransaurer's bladed polearm
  - Abilities
- Gran Bomber
  A chest-crystal-formed crystal is thrown in a boomerang fashion at the enemy
- Saurer Grand Slash
  Gransaurer's finishing attack – when the Big Lancer is not summoned before Yoji's Saurer Changer triggers this attack, it is summoned during the attack itself; an energy-formed triceratops' mouth sends the Big Lancer to Gransaurer before flying to the sky and firing a special triangle-shaped energy-formed suspension shot to suspend the target long enough for the attack to be landed – Gransaurer rides the triceratops in the fashion of coming down with the triceratops scattering apart and Gransaurer gliding the rest of the way across the ground to make the attack

The Hot-Blooded Evolution of Grantops into a robot form.

=== King Gosaurer (キングゴウザウラー, Kingu Gouzauraa) ===
- Specs
  - Height: 70.8 meters
  - Weight: 366.0 tons
  - Ground Movement Speed: 1,620 kilometers per hour
  - Top Flying Speed: Mach 9.8
  - Power Output: 1,800,000 metric horsepower (1,300,000 kW)

The Super Hot-Blooded Combination (超熱血合体, Chō Nekketsu Gattai) of Gosaurer, Magnasaurer and Gransaurer. It requires all the Saurers to be on board. The pilots of all three units are transferred to a head-based single cockpit.

- Weapons and abilities
  - Weapons
    - King Launcher
      Grantops'/Gransaurer's Tricera Launchers/Gran Launchers form shoulder-to-upper-arm missile launchers that launch a swarm
    - King Cannons
      Gosaurer's Saurer Cannons, Magnasaurer's Magna Cannons and Gransaurer's Gran Cannons are now used either in a selection of which is used or a full blast of all of the Cannons in chorus
    - King Blade
      King Gosaurer's sword
  - Abilities
    - King Fire
      It releases fire from the Triceratops head on the chest, can also use an energy blast variant called the King Titan
    - King Shot
      Magnasaurer's Magna Shot is used as a foot-mounted attack
    - Saurer King Finish
      King Gosaurer's finishing attack

In the last episode it can further combine with the every part of the school which extra amour are placed on King Gosaurer, while the usable armaments are reduced to King Blade. The unit itself is called Gakuenger (ガクエンガー, Gakuengaa).

== Songs ==
=== Opening ===
KEEP ON DREAMING
by Seraphim – a special cast-performed "SAURERS Version" is played starting from the midway point onwards of the episodes

=== Inserts ===
==== Themes ====
READY GO! Hot-Blooded Strongest King Go-Saurer
by SAURERS

=== Ending ===
OUR GOOD DAY (僕らのGOOD DAY, Bokura no Guddo Dei)
by Megumi Hayashibara

== Game appearances ==
Go-Saurer debuted as an entry in the Super Robot Wars series of video games in Super Robot Wars NEO for the Wii along with the other 3 Eldran robots.

Preceded by Genki Bakuhatsu Ganbaruger	Nekketsu Saikyo Go-Saurer; 1993–1994	Succeeded by Kanzen Shouri Daiteioh
