= Michael McConnohie =

American voice actor

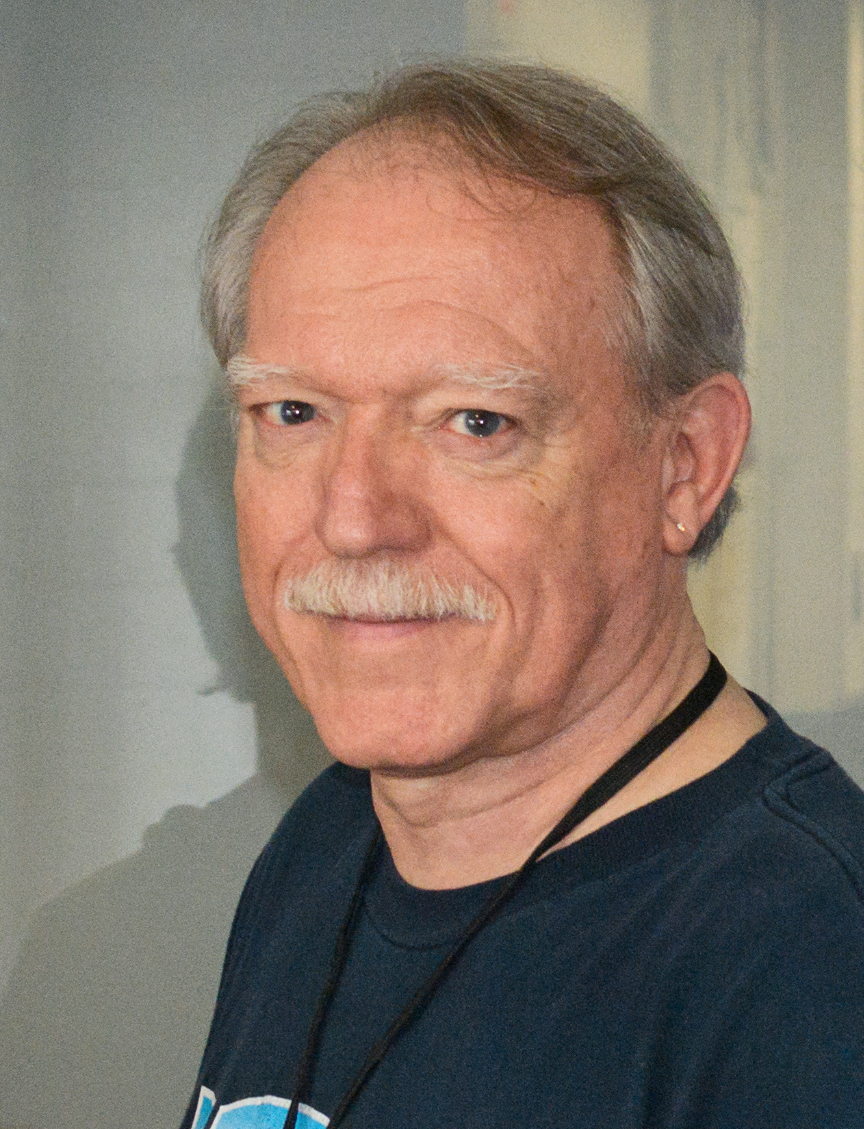
- McConnohie in 2015
- Occupations: Voice actor; writer; director
- Years active: 1978–present
- Height: 5 ft 11 in (1.80 m)
- Website: mcconnohie.com

Michael McConnohie is an American voice actor, writer, and director who has provided many voice roles in movies, anime, and video games. He and fellow actress Melodee Spevack run a production company called VoxWorks. For 20+ years, he has been the voice of the Lich King, Uther the Lightbringer, and Kel'Thuzad in the World of Warcraft iterations. Other notable career roles include the Narrator on both Bobobo-bo Bo-bobo and Hunter x Hunter, The Necromancer in Diablo II, Azulongmon, Cherrymon, and Seppikmon in Digimon, Gork in Masked Rider, Keiichi Ikari in Paranoia Agent, Rolf Emerson in Robotech, Manzou the Saw in Samurai Champloo, Cosmos and Tracks in Transformers, Hot Shot and Ironhide in Transformers: Robots in Disguise, D in Vampire Hunter D, Chief Inquisitor Margulis in Xenosaga, and Charles zi Britannia in Code Geass.

== Filmography ==
=== Anime ===
- 3×3 Eyes (Streamline Pictures dub) - Chou
- The Adventures of Manxmouse - Narrator
- Ajin - Teacher (Ep. 1)
- Aldnoah.Zero - Rayregalia Vers Rayvers
- Appleseed - General Edward Uranus III
- Argento Soma - Funeral Unit Commander, Dignitary A, General
- Babel II - Emperor Yomi
- The Big O - Schwarzwald/Michael Seebach
- Black Jack - Mangetsu Proprietor
- BlazBlue Alter Memory - Takamagahara
- Bleach - Chojiro Sasakibe, Ryūken Ishida, Kurodo, Shawlong Qufang, Toshimori Umesada, Danzomaru, Hiyosu, Shiroganehiko, Barragan Luisenbarn (episodes 216+)
- Blue Dragon - King of Jibral
- Blue Exorcist - Tatsumasa Suguro, Additional Voices
- Bobobo-bo Bo-bobo - Narrator, Bobopatchiggler
- Captain Harlock and the Queen of a Thousand Years - Captain Harlock
- Code Geass - Charles zi Britannia
- Coppelion - Gennai Ishikawa
- Cowboy Bebop - Hospital Guard, Gate Company Chairman, Yuuri Kellerman, Punch (Big Shot Host)
- Crimson Wolf - Cell Guard, Driver
- Daigunder - Additional Voices
- Digimon Tamers - Azulongmon, Vajramon, Additional Voices
- Digimon Frontier - Additional Voices
- Digimon Data Squad - Cherrymon
- Dirty Pair - Mughi
- Dragon Ball - General Pei
- Dragon Ball Super - King Kai (Bang Zoom! dub for Toonami Asia)
- Eureka Seven - Captain Jurgens
- Ergo Proxy - Husserl, Police Dog
- Fafner - Kouzou Minashiro
- Fate/stay night - Berserker, Sorcerer, Tokiomi Tohsaka
- Flag - Base Commander, Newscaster, Operator, Traffic Controller, Tson, UN Press Officer
- Gargantia on the Verdurous Planet - Captain Fairlock
- Gatchaman (1994) - Dr Nambu
- Geneshaft - Cummings
- Ghost Talker's Daydream - Detective Yamazaki
- Ghost in the Shell: Stand Alone Complex - SWAT Chief
- Golgo 13: The Professional - Leonard Dawson
- Grimm's Fairy Tale Classics - Puss in Boots
- Gungrave - Big Daddy, Deed, Scott
- Gun X Sword - Baron Mayor (Ep. 2)
- Gurren Lagann - Rossiu (20 Years Later), Father Magin
- Haibane Renmei - The Communicator, the Baker
- Haré+Guu - Elder
- Hello Kitty's Paradise - Various
- Hellsing Ultimate - Wild Geese
- Honeybee Hutch - Additional Voices
- Hunter x Hunter - Narrator, Ship Captain (episodes 1–2), Mr. Battera
- Ikki Tousen - Kaya, Narrator
- Ikki Tousen: Great Guardians - Shizonsui
- Ikki Tousen: Xtreme Xecutor - Narrator, Shisonzui
- Immortal Grand Prix (microseries) - Dimma
- Initial D (Tokyopop dub) - Yuichi Tachibana
- JoJo's Bizarre Adventure - Tonpetty, Messina
- JoJo's Bizarre Adventure: Stardust Crusaders - Impostor Captain Tennille
- Kamichu! - Prime Minister, God of Select-O-Vision, Oyadama Kaze, Sunfish Grandpa
- Karas - Chief of Police
- Kaze no Yojimbo - Kanehara
- Kekkaishi - Heisuke Matsudo, Yoki, Yumeji Hisaomi
- Kikaider - Golden Bat
- Knights of Sidonia - Council Member (episodes 1–2, 6), Hiroki Saito (Ep. 7), Old Man (episodes 1–2, 7), Play-by-Play Commentator (Ep. 3)
- Kyo Kara Maoh! - Maxine
- Last Exile - Duke Henry Knowles; Gale; Prime Minister Marius, Additional Voices
- Lensman - Van Buskirk
- Lensman: Secret of the Lens - Van Buskirk
- Lensman: Power of the Lens - Van Buskirk
- MÄR - Babbo
- Mahoromatic - Taiso Sakura, VESPER Leader (Yuichiro Konoe)
- Mao-chan - Rikushirou Onigawara
- Maple Town - Additional Voices
- Marmalade Boy - Cop; Master; Producer Takemura; Yoshimitsu Miwa
- Mars Daybreak - Poipoider, Niall Poe
- MegaMan Star Force - Wolf
- Melody of Oblivion - Bocca's father, Keiko's father, Mayor Sonada
- Mermaid Forest - Co-Worker, Old Gentleman
- Mermaid Saga - Rin's father
- Mirage of Blaze - Doctor, Kinue
- Mobile Suit Gundam (Movies I-III English Dub) - Ramba Ral
- Mobile Suit Gundam: The 08th MS Team - Norris Packard
- Mon Colle Knights - Various
- Monster - Dr. Boyer, Franz Bonaparta, Additional Voices
- Naruto - Enma
- Naruto: Shippuden - Hagoromo Ōtsutsuki
- Noein - Operator
- Noozles - Additional Voices
- Nura: Rise of the Yokai Clan series - Lord Sodemogi, Inugamigyōbu Danuki, Minagoroshi Jizo, Namahage
- Otogi Zoshi - Minamoto no Mitsunaka
- Outlaw Star - Fred's Bodyguard A
- Overman King Gainer - Yassaba Jin
- Paranoia Agent - Keiichi Ikari
- Phoenix - Old Masato
- Planetes - Dolf Azaria
- Please Teacher! - Minoru Edajima
- Rave Master - Lance of the Beast Sword
- Robotech - Rolf Emerson
- Robotech II: The Sentinels - T.R. Edwards
- Saint Tail - Mr. Kaido
- Saiyuki Gunlock - Demon, Head Priest, Villager
- Samurai Champloo - Manzo the Saw
- Scrapped Princess - Alec, Playhouse Owner, Customer
- s-CRY-ed - Unkei
- The Seven Deadly Sins - King Bartra Liones, Twigo, Denzel Liones
- Shinzo - Various
- Stellvia - Sergei Roskov, Umihito Katase
- Street Fighter Alpha: Generations - Goutetsu
- Tales of Phantasia: The Animation - Mars
- Teknoman - Lance, Ringo
- Texhnolyze - Kimata Motoharu
- The Melancholy of Haruhi Suzumiya - Okabe-sensei, Kiyosumi Morimura, Shamisen (Season 2)
- Transformers: Robots in Disguise - Hotshot, Ironhide
- Trigun - Chapel the Evergreen, Ingway
- Tenchi Muyo! GXP - Minami Kuramitsu, Mr. Kaunaq, Wau Shaman
- Tenchi Muyo! Ryo-Ohki - D3, Minami Kuramitsu
- Tsukihime, Lunar Legend - Makihisa Tohno, Doctor, Male announcer
- Ultra Maniac - Butler, Nina's Grandfather
- Vampire Hunter D - D, D's Left Hand
- Vampire Princess Miyu - Mr. Shigere
- Vandread - Hibiki's Grandfather
- Vandread: The Second Stage - Doyen, Man
- Windaria - King Draco
- Witch Hunter Robin - Cornelli / Professor / Kazuma Karata
- X - Kyogou Monou
- Ys - Slaff
- YS-II - Sada Hadat
- Zatch Bell! - Li-Akron the Crime Lord
- Zillion: Burning Night - Rick

=== Animation ===
- Avatar: The Last Airbender - Various
- Bureau of Alien Detectors - Ben Packard
- Creepy Crawlers - Additional Voices
- G.I. Joe: A Real American Hero - Cross-Country
- Inspector Mouse - Inspector Mouse
- Iznogoud - Genie
- Jin Jin and the Panda Patrol - Various
- RedHand Animation - Narrator
- Oliver Twist - Various
- The 13 Ghosts of Scooby-Doo - The Mirror Demon (ep. 4)
- The Real Ghostbusters - Steve Jennings
- The Return of Dogtanian - Narrator
- The Transformers - Cosmos, Tracks
- The Wisdom of the Gnomes - Narrator
- Visionaries: Knights of the Magical Light - Ectar, Lexor
- Walter Melon - Sneero (season 1)
- Zentrix - Emperor Jarad/Dark General/Quantum

=== Live-action ===
- Adventures in Voice Acting - Himself
- Black Lightning - Prof. Viktor Kuptsov (English dub)
- The Hallo Spencer Show - Poldi (voice, uncredited)
- Mighty Morphin Power Rangers - Gork (voice, uncredited), Repellator (voice, uncredited)
- Marseille - Robert Taro (Gérard Depardieu, English dub)
- Masked Rider - Gork (voice)
- Passions - Detective
- The District - "The Greenhouse Effect" - Max Cartwright
- Beetleborgs Metallix - Mole Monster (voice)
- Power Rangers: Turbo - Strikeout (voice, uncredited)
- Power Rangers: Lost Galaxy - Motor Mantis (voice)
- Power Rangers: Lightspeed Rescue - Mantevil (voice)
- Power Rangers: Wild Force - Narrator (Opening)
- VR Troopers - Fiddlebot (voice)
- Versus - Detective (English dub)
- Violetta - Herman (English dub)

=== Film ===
- Akira (Pioneer/Animaze) - Resistance Member 2
- A Turtle's Tale 2: Sammy's Escape from Paradise - Security Guard
- Cardcaptor Sakura: The Movie 2 - The Sealed Card - Fujitaka Kinomoto
- The Bike Squad - Stan Jackson
- The Castle of Cagliostro - Count Cagliostro (Streamline version)
- Cromartie High - The Movie - Shinichi Mechazawa, Narrator
- The Dog of Flanders - Mr. Cogetz
- Fate/stay night: Unlimited Blade Works - Berserker
- Little Big Panda - Mr. Teng
- Fist of the North Star movie - Shin
- Fly Me to the Moon - American Newscaster
- Frog-g-g! - Huntley Grimes
- G.I. Joe: The Movie - Cross Country
- Jungle Shuffle - Helms
- Lupin The 3rd: The Movie - The Secret of Mamo - Special Agent Gordon
- Little Nemo: Adventures in Slumberland - Etiquette Master
- The Little Polar Bear - Mika
- Naruto the Movie: Ninja Clash in the Land of Snow - Director Makino
- Redline - Machine Head
- Sakura Wars: The Movie - Yoritsune Hanakouji
- Scream Bloody Murder - Principal Burden
- Teenage Mutant Ninja Turtles/Teenage Mutant Ninja Turtles II: The Secret of the Ooze - Master Tatsu (voice)
- The Adventures of Panda Warrior - Captain
- Tiger and Bunny: The Rising - Johnny Wong
- Zeiram 2 - Kamiya

=== Video games ===
- .hack//G.U. series - Sirius
  - Vol.1//Rebirth
  - Vol.2//Reminisce
  - Vol.3//Redemption
- Ancient Quest of Saqqarah - Khufu
- Battleship - Commander Alan Colder
- Bleach: Soul Resurrección - Baraggan Louisenbairn
- Blue Dragon - Jiro's Father, Marumaro's Father, Yasato
- Boogerman: A Pick and Flick Adventure - Boogerman
- Call of Duty 3 - Narrator
- Castle of Shikigami III - Kagachi
- Crackdown trilogy (2007–2019) - Director Charles Goodwin
- Dead or Alive: Dimensions - Raidou
- Diablo II - Necromancer/Warrior/Warriv
- Diablo III - Rondal- Act 3 Soldier
- Supreme Commander - Berry - UEF Commander
- Eureka Seven Vol. 1: The New Wave - Captain Pete Saville (uncredited)
- Final Fantasy IV - FuSoYa, Cagnazzo
- Final Fantasy XI - Intro FMV Narrator
- Final Fantasy Crystal Chronicles: The Crystal Bearers - Jegran
- Hearthstone - Uther the Lightbringer, The Lich King, Kel'Thuzad (Archlich), Various minions
- Heroes of the Storm - Uther the Lightbringer, The Lich King, Kel'Thuzad (Archlich), Xul (Necromancer), Deathwing
- Infex - Kendall
- Lost Planet 2 - Additional voices
- Metal Gear Solid: Peace Walker - Soldiers/Extras
- ModNation Racers - Chief
- Mortal Kombat series
  - Mortal Kombat vs. DC Universe - Kano, Ganthet, Newscaster
  - Mortal Kombat - Kano, Ermac
  - Mortal Kombat X - Kano
- NCIS: The Video Game - Trevor Gates
- Ninja Gaiden 3/Ninja Gaiden 3: Razor's Edge - Ken Ishigami
- Phantasmat - The Hotel Owner
- Rave Master - Lance
- Red Faction: Guerrilla - Red Faction Commander
- Rune Factory: Tides of Destiny - Bacchus
- Sengoku Basara: Samurai Heroes - Shingen Takeda
- Seven Samurai 20XX - Kambei
- Shadow Hearts: Covenant - Minister Ishimura
- Star Ocean: First Departure - Ashlay Bernbeldt
- Street Fighter IV/Super Street Fighter IV/Super Street Fighter IV: Arcade Edition/Ultra Street Fighter IV - Seth
- Street Fighter V - Seth, Daigo Kazama
- The Last Remnant - Ludope
- Transformers: Armada The Game - Bruticus
- Warcraft III: Reign of Chaos - Uther the Lightbringer, Kel'Thuzad
- World of Warcraft - Kel'Thuzad
- World of Warcraft: The Burning Crusade - Epoch Hunter, Aeonus, Legionnaire 03, High Warlord Naj'entus
- World of Warcraft: Wrath of the Lich King - The Lich King, King Ymiron, Commander Kolurg, Uther the Lightbringer
- World of Warcraft: Cataclysm - Deathwing
- World of Warcraft: Mists of Pandaria - Sergeant Verdone
- World of Warcraft: Shadowlands - Uther the Lightbringer
- X-Morph: Defense - General
- Xenosaga Episode II - Margulis
- Xenosaga Episode III - Margulis

== Staff credits ==
=== Voice director ===
- Berserk
- Cyborg 009: Call of Justice
- Descent to Undermountain
- Seven Knights
- Star Trek: 25th Anniversary Enhanced
- Star Trek: Judgment Rites
- Stonekeep
- Transformers: Robots in Disguise

=== Script writer ===
- Aldnoah.Zero
- Around the World in 80 Dreams
- Beetleborgs Metallix
- Bleach
- Bob in a Bottle
- Bumpety Boo
- Chobits
- Creepy Crawlers
- Digimon: Digital Monsters
- Fate/stay night: Unlimited Blade Works
- Flint the Time Detective
- Gad Guard
- Grimm's Fairy Tale Classics
- Gulliver's Travels
- Hello Kitty's Paradise
- I'm Telling!
- Iznogoud
- Jin Jin and the Panda Patrol
- JoJo's Bizarre Adventure
- Jungle Tales
- Little Mouse on the Prairie
- Lunar Legend Tsukihime
- Maple Town
- Mars Daybreak
- Masked Rider
- Maya the Bee
- Mighty Morphin Power Rangers
- Mon Colle Knights
- Noozles
- Ox Tales
- Phoenix
- Princess Tenko
- Saban's Adventures of Peter Pan
- Saban's Adventures of Pinocchio
- Saban's Adventures of the Little Mermaid
- Samurai Pizza Cats
- Sandokan
- s-CRY-ed
- Shinzo
- The Littl' Bits
- The Seven Deadly Sins
- The Wisdom of The Gnomes
- Transformers: Robots in Disguise
- VR Troopers
- Wowser

=== Casting director ===
- Descent to Undermountain
- Star Trek: Judgment Rites
- Star Trek: 25th Anniversary Enhanced
- Stonekeep

=== Internet series ===
- Star Trek: Odyssey 1x05, "Keepers of the Wind" - Overseer Liendo
- Star Trek: The Helena Chronicles 1x03, "Letter of the Law" - Sidron

Preceded by Peter Cullen	Voice of Ironhide; 2001–2002	Succeeded by Matt Hill
