= List of Kirby: Right Back at Ya! episodes =

Kirby: Right Back at Ya!, known in Japan as Kirby of the Stars (星のカービィ, Hoshi no Kābī), is an anime series adapted from the video game series of the same title by Masahiro Sakurai. Produced by Studio Sign and directed by Sōji Yoshikawa with Mitsuo Kusakabe, the series was broadcast on TBS Television (Japan) and Chubu-Nippon Broadcasting, from October 6, 2001, to September 27, 2003. It follows the adventures of the titular character Kirby as he fights off monsters to his village's well-being.

Four pieces of theme music were used in the original Japanese version. The first opening theme, titled "Kirby★March" (カービィ★マーチ, Kābī★māchi), is performed by Xiang Qi, who also performed the first ending theme Kihon wa Maru (きほんはまる; "First You Draw a Circle"). The second opening and ending themes, used from episode 72 onwards, are "Kirby!" (カービィ!, Kābī!) performed by Hiroko Asakawa and Kirby☆Step! (カービィ☆ステップ!, Kābī☆suteppu) performed by Konishiki Yasokichi. 4Kids Entertainment used original music in their adaptation. The English dub used "Kirby Theme", a jazz song written by Norman J. Grossfeld and performed by Ralph Schuckett.

== Series overview ==
Season	Episodes	Originally aired			
Season	Episodes	First aired (Japan)	Last aired (Japan)	First aired (USA)	Last aired (USA)
1	26	October 6, 2001	March 30, 2002	September 14, 2002	September 16, 2006
2	25	April 6, 2002	October 5, 2002	December 7, 2002	September 23, 2006
3	25	October 12, 2002	March 29, 2003	September 6, 2003	October 16, 2004
4	24	April 5, 2003	September 27, 2003	October 23, 2004	November 4, 2006
Short	1	September 20, 2008	September 20, 2008	January 14, 2012	January 24, 2012

== Episodes ==
=== Season 1 (2001–02) ===
No.	Title (English dub title)	Episode No. Dubbed Version	Directed by	Written by	Original release date	American air date
1	"He's Here! The Pink Visitor" ("Kirby Comes to Cappy Town"); Transliteration: "Deta! Pinku no hōmonsha" (Japanese: 出た！ピンクの訪問者)	1	Mitsuo Kusakabe	Written by : Sōji Yoshikawa; Storyboarded by : Sōji Yoshikawa	October 6, 2001	September 14, 2002
The inhabitants of Cappy Town become frightened when their livestock start to disappear. Looking to the great sage Kabu for advice, he tells them of a prophecy that said a warrior named Kirby would save them in their time of need. Moments later, a short pink Star Warrior named Kirby crashes his starship nearby. The residents are unsure if he is the savior they had been hoping for, due to his harmless appearance and childlike behavior. However, he proves himself by defeating the monster that had been eating the sheep – a giant, fire-breathing octopus named Octacon. Copy Ability: Fire (debut)
2	"Oh No! Finding a Home for the Warrior" ("A Blockbuster Battle"); Transliteration: "Taihen! Senshi no o uchi sagashi" (Japanese: 大変！戦士のおうち探し)	2	Mitsuo Kusakabe	Written by : Sōji Yoshikawa; Storyboarded by : Mitsuo Kusakabe	October 13, 2001	September 14, 2002
King Dedede and Escargoon try to foil Tiff and Tuff's attempts to find Kirby a home, which leads them to ordering a monster named Blocky. Kirby is nearly defeated by Blocky, but with the support of Tiff, Tuff, and Meta Knight, the super-dense Blocky is sunk to the bottom of the ocean. Copy Ability: Stone (debut)
3	"What?! Battle with Sir Meta Knight?" ("Kirby's Duel Role"); Transliteration: "E! Metanaito kyō to taiketsu?" (Japanese: え！メタナイト卿と対決？)	3	Hiroyuki Yokoyama	Written by : Sōji Yoshikawa; Storyboarded by : Seiji Okuda	October 20, 2001	September 21, 2002
King Dedede commands a hesitant Meta Knight to challenge Kirby to a duel, but Meta Knight uses this duel to secretly instruct Kirby in swordsmanship, which Kirby uses to fight Bugzzy, Dedede's latest monster. Copy Ability: Sword (debut)
4	"The Secret of the Star Warrior" ("Dark and Stormy Knight"); Transliteration: "Hoshi no senshi no himitsu" (Japanese: 星の戦士のひみつ)	4	Masayuki Ōzeki	Written by : Sōji Yoshikawa; Storyboarded by : Masayuki Ōzeki	October 27, 2001	September 21, 2002
King Dedede summons a powerful storm monster called Kracko, which attacks all of the residents of Cappy Town and outmatches Kirby. Meanwhile, Tiff learns about NightMare Enterprises, the Star Warriors, the Warp Star, and Kirby's mysterious background from Meta Knight. Later, Kirby ventures into the heart of Kracko using the Warp Star, which gives Kirby energy and grants flight similarly to how a magic carpet would. Kracko is defeated and peace returns to Cappy Town. Copy Ability: Sword
5	"Rage! Whispy Woods" ("Beware: Whispy Woods!"); Transliteration: "Ikare! Wisupī uzzu" (Japanese: 怒れ！ウィスピーウッズ)	5	Yoshihisa Matsumoto	Written by : Sōji Yoshikawa; Storyboarded by : Mitsuo Kusakabe	November 3, 2001	September 28, 2002
Kirby and the gang get stranded in Whispy Woods, and King Dedede, who tricks Whispy into thinking Kirby and the bunch are out to destroy him, plans to chop the forest down to make a new country club. On the club's grand opening, Dedede tries to use Kirby as a golf ball, but Kirby spits out an apple that belonged to Whispy. Whispy is reborn and uses his own apples to regrow Whispy Woods and Dedede is foiled once again. NOTE: This is the first episode not to feature a copy ability.
6	"Check It Out! Channel DDD" ("Un-Reality TV"); Transliteration: "Miruzoi! Channeru DDD" (Japanese: 見るぞい！チャンネルDDD)	6	Yukio Takahashi	Written by : Sōji Yoshikawa; Storyboarded by : Masayuki Kojima	November 10, 2001	September 28, 2002
King Dedede uses the power of television to brainwash Cappy Town to turn against Kirby, filming and blaming a monster attack on his arrival to Cappy Town. Tiff, who is frustrated that everyone is glued to a screen, is not hypnotized. She saves Kirby from a Cappy mob and snaps her family out of the trance. Then, Tiff, Tuff, and Kirby sabotage Dedede's recording studio to show the monster attacks were faked. The Cappies then stop watching television and leading their usual lives again. Copy Ability: None
7	"Counterattack! Dyna Blade" ("Kirby's Egg-Cellent Adventure"); Transliteration: "Gyakushū! Daina bureido" (Japanese: 逆襲！ダイナブレイド)	7	Hiroshi Harada	Written by : Mariko Kunisawa; Storyboarded by : Hiroshi Harada	November 17, 2001	October 5, 2002
King Dedede tricks Kirby into eating the Dyna Blade's egg, but before Kirby can actually eat it, the egg hatches. But when Dyna Blade thinks Kirby did eat the egg, it attacks Kirby and all of Cappy Town, leading to Kirby battling it. However, when Dyna Blade's chick appears and is shown they befriend Kirby, Dyna Blade thanks Kirby, but is a bit disappointed that Kirby tried to eat the egg.
8	"Curio's Ancient Pupupu Civilization" ("Curio's Curious Discovery"); Transliteration: "Kyurio-shi no kodai pupupu bunmei" (Japanese: キュリオ氏の古代プププ文明)	8	Kiyoshi Egami	Written by : Kisuke Baba; Storyboarded by : Kiyoshi Egami	November 24, 2001	October 5, 2002
Ancient Dedede artifacts start appearing in a dig site, confirming King Dedede's right to the throne. However, Dr, Curio is caught planting these artifacts, so he confesses that he faked the artifacts to validate Dedede's royalty because Dedede bribed the archeologist to do so as his business was failing. Dedede then calls upon the Dedede stone, which transforms into a giant rock monster at the king's control, but it is no match for Stone Kirby, who destroys it. Copy Ability: Stone
9	"Lololo and Lalala, Melody of Love" ("The Fofa Factor"); Transliteration: "Rororo to rarara ai no merodi" (Japanese: ロロロとラララ愛のメロディ)	9	Masayuki Ōzeki	Written by : Ai Shitayoshi; Storyboarded by : Masayuki Ōzeki	December 1, 2001	October 12, 2002
Fololo and Falala learn of their origin while Kirby is temporarily divided into the helpless Kirby-A and Kirby-B by a monster called Slice n' Splice, who can divide and mismatch its enemies. Kirby is restored as Fololo and Falala selflessly give up their chance at being reunited, and Slice n' Splice is sliced in half by Kirby. Copy Ability: Cutter (debut)
10	"Reinstate Chief Borun" ("Hail to the Chief"); Transliteration: "Borun shochō o rinyuaru seyo" (Japanese: ボルン署長をリニュアルせよ)	10	Hiroyuki Yokoyama	Written by : Rima Nozoe; Storyboarded by : Masayuki Kojima	December 8, 2001	October 12, 2002
When King Dedede threatens to fire Chief Bookum for his laziness on the job, Tuff and friends create crimes to give the deposed Chief something to solve, accumulating to assuring Tuff's safety after the boy falls into a volcano as they await rescue, and he winds up a hero.
11	"Court Chef Kawasaki" ("The Big Taste Test"); Transliteration: "Kyūtei shefu Kawasaki" (Japanese: 宮廷シェフ・カワサキ)	11	Yoshihisa Matsumoto	Written by : Nobuaki Yamaguchi; Storyboarded by : Yoshihisa Matsumoto	December 15, 2001	October 19, 2002
The monster Popon comes to town disguised as Shiitake, the mentor of Chef Kawasaki, who is eager to impress his teacher. "Shiitake" claims to visit Cappy Town to critique the castle's cuisine, but reveals its true form upon exposure as a fake. Kirby then defeats it with help from his friends. Copy Ability: Cook (debut)
12	"The Ghost of Dedede Castle" ("Escargoon Squad"); Transliteration: "Dedede-jō no yūrei" (Japanese: デデデ城のユーレイ)	14	Tarō Iwasaki	Written by : Mariko Kunisawa; Storyboarded by : Tarō Iwasaki	December 22, 2001	October 26, 2002
When Escargoon takes a picture of King Dedede, a ghost named Urameshiya appears, which begins to scare everyone in the castle. Escargoon, having dealt with Dedede's numerous pranks, avenges them by rigging up the castle by making the drawbridge close when they try to get into the castle, disguise Kirby, Fololo and Falala as ghosts and trap him in a room, imprisoned with a swinging axe and skeleton props above him. Everyone finally figures out that N.M.E. was behind it all.
13	"Pupu Village Year-End Fireworks Display" ("Cappy New Year"); Transliteration: "Pupu birejji toshiwasure hanabi taikai" (Japanese: ププビレッジ年忘れ花火大会)	29	Tarō Iwasaki	Written by : Sōji Yoshikawa; Storyboarded by : Naoyuki Kuzuya	December 29, 2001	December 28, 2002
King Dedede orders Sasuke, a firework monster and excellent builder, and attempts to destroy Kirby and ruin Cappy Town's New Year's celebration. NOTE: This is the first Kirby with more than one copy ability. Copy Ability: Fire, Parasol (debut)
14	"The Dream Pillow Monster Shows Its Face" ("The Pillow Case"); Transliteration: "Yumemakura majū no kaomise" (Japanese: 夢枕魔獣顔見勢)	13	Mitsuo Kusakabe	Written by : Sōji Yoshikawa; Storyboarded by : Mitsuo Kusakabe	January 5, 2002	October 26, 2002
King Dedede orders magic pillows filled with Noddies that turn everyone's dreams into nightmares about Kirby which turn them against him.
15	"The Birth of Kirby's Little Brother?" ("Kirby's Pet Peeve"); Transliteration: "Tanjō? Kābī no otōto?" (Japanese: 誕生？カービィのおとうと？)	12	Hiroshi Harada	Written by : Rima Nozoe; Storyboarded by : Hiroshi Harada	January 12, 2002	October 19, 2002
Kirby receives a robotic toy dog as a present—but N.M.E. manufactured it. Kirby, unsure about the toy, begins to run away after it begins to chase him. However, after saving the dog from drowning, they grow a close relationship. Jealous, Tuff's friends and King Dedede try to capture the dog. Seeing how the dog has a defense system, Tuff's friends give up. Tiff warns Kirby that since the dog was manufactured by N.M.E., something bad will happen. Shortly after, the dog falls off a cliff and into the ocean, Kirby tries to save it, but Dedede captures it. Sadly, though the dog was set to explode.
16	"The Fish Who Loved Me" ("A Fish Called Kine"); Transliteration: "Watashi o aishita sakana" (Japanese: 私を愛したサカナ)	15	Jōhei Matsuura	Written by : Nobuaki Yamaguchi; Storyboarded by : Jōhei Matsuura	January 19, 2002	November 2, 2002
Kine, a fish, falls in love with Tiff; meanwhile, King Dedede tries to seize the Rainbow Coral Reef. Copy Ability: Tornado (debut)
17	"Pāmu and Mēmu's Ring Story" ("The Thing About the Ring"); Transliteration: "Pāmu to mēmu no yubiwa monogatari" (Japanese: パームとメームの指輪物語)	94	Hiroyuki Yokoyama	Written by : Mariko Kunisawa; Storyboarded by : Yoshihiro Takamoto	January 26, 2002	September 16, 2006
Sir Ebrum wants to present Lady Like with a ring, but Kirby accidentally loses it. A comedy of errors ensues.
18	"The Pink Ball in the Sleepy Forest" ("Flower Power"); Transliteration: "Nemuri no mori no pinku bōru" (Japanese: 眠りの森のピンクボール)	16	Yoshihisa Matsumoto	Written by : Kisuke Baba; Storyboarded by : Yoshihisa Matsumoto	February 2, 2002	November 2, 2002
Kirby swallows a Noddy and catches sleeping sickness, but only the evil Pukey Flower can save him. Copy Ability: Needle (debut)
19	"Here Comes Knuckle Joe!" ("Here Comes the Son"); Transliteration: "Nakkuru jō ga yattekita!" (Japanese: ナックルジョーがやって来た！)	17	Masayuki Ōzeki	Written by : Rima Nozoe; Storyboarded by : Masayuki Ōzeki	February 9, 2002	November 9, 2002
Knuckle Joe arrives in Cappy Town and tries to avenge his father's death from a star warrior, and King Dedede frames an innocent Kirby; Kirby "mirrors" Joe to make him realize his monstrous ways, and Meta Knight tells Joe the truth about his father. Copy Ability: Fighter (debut), Needle
20	"Goodbye, Snowman Chilly" ("Dedede's Snow Job"); Transliteration: "Sayonara, yukidaruma chirī" (Japanese: さよなら、雪だるまチリー)	18	Tarō Iwasaki	Written by : Naruhiko Tatsumiya; Storyboarded by : Tarō Iwasaki	February 16, 2002	November 9, 2002
The Ice Dragon brings winter to Cappy Town and Kirby befriends a snowman named Chilly. Copy Ability: Ice (debut)
21	"Princess Rona's Holiday" ("A Princess in Dis-Dress"); Transliteration: "Ōjo rōna no kyūjitsu" (Japanese: 王女ローナの休日)	19	Hiroshi Harada	Written by : Rima Nozoe; Storyboarded by : Hiroshi Harada	February 23, 2002	November 16, 2002
Tiff befriends Commander Vee (who is a visiting Princess Rona in disguise); Kirby fights Susshi after King Dedede duels Vee. Copy Ability: Sword
22	"Showdown on a Solitary Island: Old Soldiers Never Die!" ("Island of the Lost Warrior"); Transliteration: "Kotō no kessen rōhei wa shinazu!" (Japanese: 孤島の決戦・老兵は死なず！)	20	Jōhei Matsuura	Written by : Kisuke Baba; Storyboarded by : Jōhei Matsuura	March 2, 2002	November 16, 2002
A typhoon strands Kirby, Tiff, Tuff and crew on the island of Kit Cosmos, an old Star Warrior; Kirby vanquishes King Dedede's latest monster, Tornadon. Copy Ability: Tornado
23	"Stray Dyna Baby" ("The Empty Nest Mess"); Transliteration: "Maigo no dainabeibī" (Japanese: 迷子のダイナベイビー)	21	Masayuki Ōzeki	Written by : Mariko Kunisawa; Storyboarded by : Eizō Kojima	March 9, 2002	November 23, 2002
King Dedede kidnaps Dyna Chick with hopes of injecting it to make it a monster; Dyna Blade gets even.
24	"Ninja Benikage is Here!" ("Ninja Binge"); Transliteration: "Ninja, benikage sanjō!" (Japanese: ニンジャ、ベニカゲ参上!)	22	Yoshihisa Matsumoto	Written by : Nobuaki Yamaguchi; Storyboarded by : Seiji Okuda	March 16, 2002	November 23, 2002
An ancient scroll is Benikage's ninja report card; Kirby must battle Yamikage, a ninja and former Star Warrior hired by King Dedede. Copy Ability: Ninja (debut)
25	"Escargon's Mother Dearest" ("Like Mother, Like Snail" / "Escargoon Rules"); Transliteration: "Esukarugon, mabuta no haha" (Japanese: エスカルゴン、まぶたの母)	23	Hiroyuki Yokoyama	Written by : Mariko Kunisawa; Storyboarded by : Masayuki Kojima	March 23, 2002	November 30, 2002
Cappy Town pretends that Escargoon is King when his mom visits; King Dedede unleashes the Drifters to get even. Copy Ability: Parasol
26	"Loyalty! Sword and Blade" ("Sword and Blade, Loyal and True" / "Hour of the WolfWrath"); Transliteration: "Chūsei! Sōdo to bureido" (Japanese: 忠誠！ソードとブレイド)	24	Tarō Iwasaki	Written by : Rima Nozoe; Storyboarded by : Naoyuki Kuzuya	March 30, 2002	November 30, 2002
King Dedede orders WolfWrath, a fire-breathing wolf monster. It paralyzes Meta Knight, and his loyal followers Sword and Blade must now defeat him with Kirby's help. Copy Ability: Galaxia (debut)

=== Season 2 (2002) ===
No.	Title (English dub title)	Episode No. Dubbed Version	Directed by	Written by	Original release date	American air date
27	"Whispy Woods in Love" ("The Flower Plot"); Transliteration: "Koi ni ochita wisupī uzzu" (Japanese: 恋に落ちたウィスピーウッズ)	25	Hiroshi Harada	Written by : Nobuaki Yamaguchi; Storyboarded by : Takeru Yamazaki; Hiroshi Harada	April 6, 2002	December 7, 2002
Whispy's new flower friend, Lovely, is kidnapped by King Dedede and transformed into a monster that Kirby must defeat. Copy Ability: Cutter
28	"Dedede Factory of Terror" ("Labor Daze"); Transliteration: "Kyōfu no dedede fakutorī" (Japanese: 恐怖のデデデ・ファクトリー)	26	Kiyoshi Egami	Written by : Sōji Yoshikawa; Storyboarded by : Jōhei Matsuura	April 20, 2002	December 7, 2002
King Dedede tricks the Cappies into working at a factory, where they unwittingly assemble parts for the Ice Dragon Robot. Copy Ability: Ice
29	"Extra Spicy! Diner Wars" ("The Hot Shot Chef" / "A Spice Odyssey"); Transliteration: "Gekikara! Famiresu sensō" (Japanese: 激辛！ファミレス戦争)	27	Masayuki Ōzeki	Written by : Mariko Kunisawa; Storyboarded by : Kazuhito Kozu	April 27, 2002	December 14, 2002
King Dedede orders a monster chef, Goan, to out-spice Kawasaki; Goan tricks the Cappies into wanting to eat Kirby. Copy Ability: Cook
30	"Kirby's Mysterious Egg" ("Hatch Me if You Can"); Transliteration: "Kābī no nazo no tamago" (Japanese: カービィの謎のタマゴ)	28	Yukitaka Koyama	Written by : Ai Shitayoshi; Storyboarded by : Yoshihisa Matsumoto	May 4, 2002	December 14, 2002
Kirby raises a newborn called Baby Galbo; Baby must choose between Kirby and the evil, much larger Galbo monster. Copy Ability: Fire
31	"Viva! Welcome to DedeVegas!" ("Abusement Park"); Transliteration: "Biba! Dedebegasu e yōkoso" (Japanese: ビバ！デデベガスへようこそ)	30	Hiroyuki Yokoyama	Written by : Sōji Yoshikawa; Storyboarded by : Naoyuki Kuzuya	May 11, 2002	February 1, 2003
King Dedede transforms the castle into an amusement park and Kirby retaliates with a karaoke attack. Copy Ability: Mike (debut)
32	"A Story About Not Being Toothless" ("A Dental Dilemma"); Transliteration: "Ha nashi ni naranai hanashi" (Japanese: 歯なしにならないハナシ)	95	Tarō Iwasaki	Written by : Mariko Kunisawa; Storyboarded by : Tarō Iwasaki	May 18, 2002	September 23, 2006
King Dedede and Tuff suffer from toothaches and have to see Dr. Yabui and have their teeth drilled. Copy Ability: Tornado
33	"Huh?! The Space Garbage Dump" ("Junk Jam"); Transliteration: "Eeh! Uchū no gomisuteba" (Japanese: え～っ！宇宙のゴミ捨て場)	31	Hiroshi Harada	Written by : Chinatsu Hōjō; Storyboarded by : Ichizō Fukushima	May 25, 2002	February 1, 2003
A spaceship dumps interplanetary trash over Cappy Town and Fire Lion is supposed to incinerate it. Copy Ability: Fire
34	"Ultimate Iron Man, Cook Osaka" ("A Recipe for Disaster"); Transliteration: "Kyūkyoku tetsujin kokkuoosaka" (Japanese: 究極鉄人・コックオオサカ)	34	Shigeru Yamazaki	Written by : Rima Nozoe; Storyboarded by : Seiji Okuda	June 1, 2002	February 15, 2003
The real Chef Shiitake visits and Kirby makes "popcorn" out of King Dedede's monster, Cobgoblin. Copy Ability: Cook
35	"The Glorious Pupupu Grand Prix" ("The Kirby Derby"); Transliteration: "Eikō no pupupu guranpuri" (Japanese: 栄光のプププ・グランプ)	32	Masayuki Ōzeki; Kiyoshi Egami	Written by : Nobuaki Yamaguchi; Storyboarded by : Masayuki Ōzeki; Kiyoshi Egami	June 8, 2002	February 8, 2003
36	"The Glorious Pupupu Grand Prix" ("The Kirby Derby"); Transliteration: "Eikō no pupupu guranpuri" (Japanese: 栄光のプププ・グランプ)	33	Masayuki Ōzeki; Kiyoshi Egami	Written by : Nobuaki Yamaguchi; Storyboarded by : Masayuki Ōzeki; Kiyoshi Egami	June 15, 2002	February 8, 2003
King Dedede downloads an evil racecar to use in Cappy Town's Grand Prix; Kirby races, too. Kirby's vehicle is sabotaged by King Dedede and the Mayor is ultimately victorious. Copy Ability: Wheel (debut)
37	"Crush the Lunchtime Dedede-Wide!" ("Watermelon Felon"); Transliteration: "Ohiru no dededewaido o tsubuse!" (Japanese: お昼のデデデワイドをつぶせ！)	35	Yoshihisa Matsumoto	Written by : Chinatsu Hōjō; Storyboarded by : Yoshihisa Matsumoto	June 22, 2002	March 1, 2003
King Dedede uses Channel DDD and his personal newspaper to frame Kirby and propagate lies about him.
38	"Read It! The Amazing Million Seller" ("A Novel Approach"); Transliteration: "Yomuzoi! Kyōi no mirionserā" (Japanese: 読むぞい！驚異のミリオンセラー)	44	Hiroyuki Yokoyama	Written by : Sōji Yoshikawa; Storyboarded by : Masayuki Kojima	June 29, 2002	June 21, 2003
King Dedede's monster is an imposter author of the Pappy Pottey book who transforms into the Broom King. Copy Ability: Cleaning (debut)
39	"The Forgotten Escargon" ("Escar-Gone"); Transliteration: "Bōkyaku no esukarugon" (Japanese: 忘却のエスカルゴン)	36	Hiroshi Harada	Written by : Chinatsu Hōjō; Storyboarded by : Seiji Arihara	July 6, 2002	March 8, 2003
Escargoon swallows Erasem in his sleep and awakens to find that no one recognizes him anymore.
40	"Monster Hunter Knuckle Joe!" ("Monster Management"); Transliteration: "Majū hantā nakkuru jō!" (Japanese: 魔獣ハンター・ナックルジョー！)	37	Tarō Iwasaki	Written by : Rima Nozoe; Storyboarded by : Tarō Iwasaki	July 13, 2002	March 15, 2003
Knuckle Joe returns disguised as an evil N.M.E. agent, but he's actually a monster hunter after Masher. Copy Ability: Fighter
41	"Prophecies of Mabel" ("Prediction Predicament"); Transliteration: "Mēberu no daiyogen" (Japanese: メーベルの大予言)	38	Shigeru Yamazaki; Masayuki Ōzeki	Written by : Sōji Yoshikawa; Mariko Kunisawa; Storyboarded by : Seiji Okuda; Hiroshi Aoyama	July 20, 2002 (part 1); July 27, 2002 (part 2)	March 22, 2003 (part 1); March 29, 2003 (part 2)
42	"Prophecies of Mabel" ("Prediction Predicament"); Transliteration: "Mēberu no daiyogen" (Japanese: メーベルの大予言)	39	Shigeru Yamazaki; Masayuki Ōzeki	Written by : Sōji Yoshikawa; Mariko Kunisawa; Storyboarded by : Seiji Okuda; Hiroshi Aoyama	July 20, 2002 (part 1); July 27, 2002 (part 2)	March 22, 2003 (part 1); March 29, 2003 (part 2)
A giant asteroid is about to hit Cappy Town, and everyone is scrambling to come up with ideas to deflect it. Copy Ability: Fire
43	"Rebellion of the Sheep" ("Sheepwrecked"); Transliteration: "Hitsuji-tachi no hangyaku" (Japanese: ヒツジたちの反逆)	40	Akira Toba	Written by : Chinatsu Hōjō; Storyboarded by : Takaaki Ishiyama	August 3, 2002	April 5, 2003
Amon turns a mindless flock of sheep into a herd of wolves who seek revenge on all of Cappy Town. Copy Ability: Needle
44	"Acore, Friend of Whispy Woods" ("War of the Woods"); Transliteration: "Wisupī Uzzu no Tomo Akoru" (Japanese: ウィスピーウッズの友・アコル)	41	Akira Mano	Written by : Nobuaki Yamaguchi; Storyboarded by : Shinji Sakai	August 10, 2002	April 12, 2003
Whispy's friend, Acore, is in danger until some animal friends help Kirby and friends fight the forces of nature. Copy Ability: Cutter
45	"A Midsummer Night's Scream!" ("Scare Tactics"); Transliteration: "Manatsu no yoru no yūrei!" (Japanese: 真夏の夜のユーレイ！)	52	Hiroyuki Yokoyama; Hiroshi Harada	Written by : Mariko Kunisawa; Storyboarded by : Masayuki Kojima; Seiji Arihara	August 17, 2002	October 25, 2003
46	"A Midsummer Night's Scream!" ("Scare Tactics"); Transliteration: "Manatsu no yoru no yūrei!" (Japanese: 真夏の夜のユーレイ！)	53	Hiroyuki Yokoyama; Hiroshi Harada	Written by : Mariko Kunisawa; Storyboarded by : Masayuki Kojima; Seiji Arihara	August 24, 2002	November 1, 2003
The Cappies plan a fun Spook-Out in Whispy Woods, but King Dedede uses the opportunity to get rid of Kirby by scaring them himself. When a storm arrives, Kirby, Tiff, Tuff, Dedede and Escargoon take shelter in a haunted house designed by N.M.E. and have to survive the terrors inside. Note: In Japan, there was a contest held by CBC that encouraged viewers of the show to design new guest characters that they wanted to see in future episodes of the show. The winning entry (a blue, bubble-breathing ghost named Shaabon) was featured in this special. The contest was first announced in the "Pupupu Tsushin" segment at the end of the Japanese version of "Hatch Me if You Can", and entries were solicited from May 4 (the day of said broadcast) to 31, 2002, with the winner announced in the "Pupupu Tsushin" segment of "War of the Woods". Copy Ability: Fire
47	"Come Home, Dear Waddle Dee" ("Pink-Collar Blues"); Transliteration: "Kaere, aishi no wadorudi" (Japanese: 帰れ、愛しのワドルディ)	42	Yoshihisa Matsumoto	Written by : Rima Nozoe; Storyboarded by : Tarō Iwasaki	August 31, 2002	April 19, 2003
King Dedede fires the Waddle Dees and orders a Domestic Servant Robot; but the Waddle Dees are still loyal to him by protecting his vault. Copy Ability: Stone
48	"Pupupu Land Sightseeing Tour" ("Tourist Trap"); Transliteration: "Pupupu rando kankō tsuā" (Japanese: プププランド観光ツアー)	43	Shigeru Yamazaki	Written by : Nobuaki Yamaguchi; Storyboarded by : Seiji Okuda	September 14, 2002	April 26, 2003
King Dedede wants to put on a show for the tourists, so he downloads Flame Feeder meant to destroy Kirby. Copy Ability: Fire, Ice
49	"New Animated Series: Dedede of the Stars" ("Cartoon Buffoon"); Transliteration: "Anime shinbangumi hoshi no dedede" (Japanese: アニメ新番組・星のデデデ)	47	Tarō Iwasaki	Written by : Sōji Yoshikawa; Storyboarded by : Mitsuo Kusakabe	September 21, 2002	September 20, 2003
Inspired by Tiff's flipbook, King Dedede opens an animation studio in order to produce a TV program that stars himself as the main character and Kirby as the villain.
50	"Save Up! The Cursed Piggy Bank" ("Don't Bank on It"); Transliteration: "Tameruzoi! Noroi no chokin-bako" (Japanese: 貯めるぞい！のろいの貯金箱)	48	Masayuki Ōzeki	Written by : Chinatsu Hōjō; Storyboarded by : Hiroshi Aoyama	September 28, 2002	September 27, 2003
King Dedede distributes Dedede Dolls fashioned in his likeness to brainwash Cappies, but the plan backfires.
51	"Sentimental Kirby" ("Kirby Takes the Cake"); Transliteration: "Senchimentaru kābī" (Japanese: センチメンタル・カービィ)	49	Akira Mano	Written by : Chinatsu Hōjō; Storyboarded by : Akira Mano; Seiji Arihara	October 5, 2002	October 4, 2003
It is Kirby's one-year Anniversary of landing in Cappy Town, but he and King Dedede are unaware about it being a surprise. Copy Ability: Bomb (debut)

=== Season 3 (2002–03) ===
No.	Title (English dub title)	Episode No. Dubbed Version	Directed by	Written by	Original release date	American air date
52	"Devil's Chocolate Capsules!" ("Snack Attack"); Transliteration: "Akuma no choko kapuseru!" (Japanese: 悪魔のチョコカプセル！)	45	Hiroyuki Yokoyama; Yoshihisa Matsumoto	Written by : Mariko Kunisawa; Storyboarded by : Masayuki Kojima; Yoshihisa Matsumoto	October 12, 2002	September 6, 2003
53	"Devil's Chocolate Capsules!" ("Snack Attack"); Transliteration: "Akuma no choko kapuseru!" (Japanese: 悪魔のチョコカプセル！)	46	Hiroyuki Yokoyama; Yoshihisa Matsumoto	Written by : Mariko Kunisawa; Storyboarded by : Masayuki Kojima; Yoshihisa Matsumoto	October 19, 2002	September 13, 2003
A candy-toy craze is sweeping Cappy Town when N.M.E. sells a line of 3 Color Fighters disguised as Chocolate. Kirby ends up taking on King Dedede's rare fighter models in a battle tournament. Copy Ability: Fighter
54	"Quixano the Over-the-Top Knight!" ("One Crazy Knight"); Transliteration: "Yarisugi no kishi! Kihāno" (Japanese: やりすぎの騎士！キハーノ)	54	Akira Toba	Written by : Rima Nozoe; Storyboarded by : Sumio Watanabe	October 26, 2002	November 8, 2003
A crazy knight crashes near Cappy Town and attacks Kirby, thinking he is a monster. Copy Ability: Mirror (debut)
55	"Dedede's Certain Love" ("Sweet & Sour Puss"); Transliteration: "Aru ai no dedede" (Japanese: ある愛のデデデ)	55	Hiroshi Harada	Written by : Chinatsu Hōjō; Storyboarded by : Seiji Arihara	November 2, 2002	November 15, 2003
An accident happens while King Dedede tries to order a monster that turns him from bad to good. Copy Ability: Needle
56	"Scarfy the Selfish Pet" ("Dedede's Pet Threat"); Transliteration: "Wagamama petto, sukāfi" (Japanese: わがままペット、スカーフィ)	56	Shigeru Yamazaki	Written by : Nobuaki Yamaguchi; Storyboarded by : Seiji Okuda	November 9, 2002	November 22, 2003
King Dedede's new pet Scarfies go on a hungry rampage after he ditches them in the woods. Copy Ability: Hammer (debut)
57	"He Who Makes Fun of Pie Will Cry at Pie!" ("A Half-Baked Battle"); Transliteration: "Pai o warau mono wa pai ni nakuzoi!" (Japanese: パイを笑う者はパイに泣くぞい！)	57	Tarō Iwasaki	Written by : Chinatsu Hōjō; Storyboarded by : Tarō Iwasaki	November 16, 2002	November 29, 2003
When King Dedede gets hit in the face with a giant pie, he gets humiliated cause the whole town gets into a pie fight. Copy Ability: Bomb
58	"The Monster Teacher Shall Punish You!" ("eNeMeE Elementary"); Transliteration: "Majū kyōshi de oshioki yo!" (Japanese: 魔獣教師でお仕置きよ！)	58	Masayuki Ōzeki	Written by : Junya Yoshida; Storyboarded by : Hiroshi Aoyama	November 23, 2002	December 6, 2003
When all the kids start making fun of King Dedede by painting silly pictures of him on the walls, he decides to start a school for young children to learn to respect him. Copy Ability: Fighter
59	"The Greatest Show Strikes! Evening Meals" ("The Meal Moocher"); Transliteration: "Saikyō bangumi, chokugeki! Ban-gohan" (Japanese: 最強番組、直撃！晩ごはん)	59	Akane Inoue	Written by : Rima Nozoe; Storyboarded by : Seiji Arihara	November 30, 2002	December 13, 2003
When King Dedede gets tired of the same meals over and over, he starts a cooking show that haves him going to Cappy Town's homes to eat their meals. Copy Ability: Cook
60	"The Treasured Sword Galaxia!" ("Crusade for the Blade"); Transliteration: "Hōken gyarakushia!" (Japanese: 宝剣ギャラクシア！)	60	Hiroyuki Yokoyama	Written by : Nobuaki Yamaguchi; Storyboarded by : Naoyuki Kuzuya	December 7, 2002	February 7, 2004
Sirica comes down to Cappy Town in her spaceship and attempts to steal Galaxia from Meta Knight in order to avenge her mother's death by the hands of the great beast, Kirisakin. Copy Ability: Sword, Galaxia
61	"Weight Disaster! Snack Junkies" ("Fitness Fiend"); Transliteration: "Hisan! Sunakku jankī" (Japanese: 肥惨！スナックジャンキー)	61	Yoshihisa Matsumoto	Written by : Mariko Kunisawa; Storyboarded by : Masayuki Kojima	December 14, 2002	February 14, 2004
When King Dedede and Kirby get fat from eating too much snacks, Dedede hires a fitness instructor from N.M.E. to thin them out. Copy Ability: Mike
62	"It's Only Fortune-Telling, But It's Still Fortune-Telling" ("Mabel Turns the Tables"); Transliteration: "Takaga uranai, saredo uranai" (Japanese: たかが占い、されど占い)	62	Hiroshi Harada	Written by : Mariko Kunisawa; Storyboarded by : Seiji Arihara	December 21, 2002	February 21, 2004
When Mabel stars on King Dedede's latest program, her fortunes start coming true. Copy Ability: Tornado
63	"December Colds are Hard to Deal With!" ("Something to Sneeze At"); Transliteration: "Shiwasu no kaze wa tsuraizoi!" (Japanese: 師走のカゼはつらいぞい！)	63	Hiroshi Kimura	Written by : Chinatsu Hōjō; Storyboarded by : Akitoshi Shimazu	December 28, 2002	February 28, 2004
When everyone catches a cold before the new year, King Dedede tries to catch one because of a rumor. Copy Ability: Mini (debut)
64	"New Year! Kirby Quiz Show" ("The Kirby Quiz"); Transliteration: "Shinshun! Kābī kuizu shō" (Japanese: 新春！カービィ・クイズショー)	64	Tarō Iwasaki	Written by : Sōji Yoshikawa; Storyboarded by : Mitsuo Kusakabe	January 4, 2003	March 6, 2004
Everyone kicks off the new year by having a quiz show featuring clips from previous episodes. Copy Ability: Ice, Stone, Fire, Needle, Cook, Mike, Tornado, Sword, Galaxia (flashbacks)
65	"Knuckle Joe on the Run!" ("Masher 2.0"); Transliteration: "Nigete kita nakkuru jō" (Japanese: 逃げてきたナックルジョー)	65	Masayuki Ōzeki	Written by : Rima Nozoe; Storyboarded by : Masayuki Ōzeki	January 11, 2003	March 13, 2004
An injured Knuckle Joe arrives after trying to defeat the revived Masher, who also came to defeat him. Copy Ability: Fighter
66	"Wandering Pengis" ("The Chill Factor"); Transliteration: "Samayoeru pengī" (Japanese: さまよえるペンギー)	66	Akira Mano	Written by : Mariko Kunisawa; Storyboarded by : Seiji Arihara	January 18, 2003	March 20, 2004
Winter comes yet again when wandering Pengis visit Cappy Town. Copy Ability: Ice
67	"Monster Teacher 2" ("The School Scam"); Transliteration: "Majū kyōshi 2" (Japanese: 魔獣教師2)	67	Hiroyuki Yokoyama	Written by : Sōji Yoshikawa; Storyboarded by : Masayuki Kojima	January 25, 2003	March 27, 2004
King Dedede hires some punks to blame Tiff for bad education in Cappy Town. Copy Ability: Fighter
68	"Achieve Victory! The Age of Delivery" ("Delivery Dilemma"); Transliteration: "Kachinuke! Deribarī jidai" (Japanese: 勝ち抜け！デリバリー時代)	68	Yoshihisa Matsumoto	Written by : Chinatsu Hōjō; Storyboarded by : Yoshihisa Matsumoto	February 1, 2003	April 3, 2004
Kawasaki starts a delivery service for his restaurant, but Kirby is sorely tempted to eat his food. Copy Ability: Jet (debut)
69	"Whispy Forest Ecotour" ("Trick or Trek"); Transliteration: "Wisupī no mori no ekotsuā" (Japanese: ウィスピーの森のエコツアー)	69	Hiroshi Harada	Written by : Nobuaki Yamaguchi; Storyboarded by : Seiji Arihara	February 8, 2003	April 10, 2004
While on a hike through Whispy Woods, King Dedede and Escargoon set fire to the forest. Copy Ability: Tornado
70	"The Legend of Lord Tokkori" ("Buccaneer Birdy"); Transliteration: "Tokkori kyō no densetsu" (Japanese: トッコリ卿の伝説)	70	Tameo Kohanawa	Written by : Chinatsu Hōjō; Storyboarded by : Tameo Kohanawa	February 15, 2003	April 17, 2004
After the Villagers get tired of having Tokkori around, they find out he's a royal bird. Copy Ability: Mirror
71	"Close Up! Whale Watching" ("A Whale of a Tale"); Transliteration: "Mitchaku! Hoēru wotchingu" (Japanese: 密着！ホエール・ウォッチング)	71	Tarō Iwasaki	Written by : Satoshi Yumi; Storyboarded by : Tarō Iwasaki	February 22, 2003	April 24, 2004
King Dedede organizes a whale-watching cruise, but he really wants to use it to catch a whale.
72	"Waddle Dees for Sale" ("Waddle While You Work"); Transliteration: "Wadorudi urimasu" (Japanese: ワドルディ売ります)	72	Masayuki Ōzeki	Written by : Rima Nozoe; Storyboarded by : Masayuki Ōzeki	March 1, 2003	September 18, 2004
After Customer Service demands for money, King Dedede sells all of his Waddle Dees in order to pay N.M.E. back.
73	"Spin the Sushi-Go-Round" ("Dedede's Raw Deal"); Transliteration: "Maware kaitensushi" (Japanese: まわれ回転寿司)	73	Akane Inoue	Written by : Sōji Yoshikawa; Storyboarded by : Seiji Arihara	March 8, 2003	September 25, 2004
N.M.E. Salesman has a new lunch spot, so King Dedede orders Chef Kawasaki to turn his restaurant into a sushi bar. Copy Ability: Spark (debut)
74	"Mothgaber Strikes Back!" ("Caterpillar Thriller"); Transliteration: "Mosugabā no gyakushū!" (Japanese: モスガバーの逆襲！)	74	Hiroyuki Yokoyama	Written by : Sōji Yoshikawa; Storyboarded by : Hiroshi Hata	March 15, 2003	October 2, 2004
N.M.E. gives King Dedede two captive twins from Popstar's South Sea in order to get rid of Kirby. Meanwhile, a giant caterpillar is giving everyone in Cappy Town hay fever.
75	"Dream Dino Heaven!" ("Fossil Fools"); Transliteration: "Yume no kyōryū tengoku!" (Japanese: 夢の恐竜天国！)	75	Yoshihisa Matsumoto; Hiroshi Harada	Written by : Mariko Kunisawa; Storyboarded by : Yoshihisa Matsumoto; Seiji Arihara	March 22, 2003	October 9, 2004
76	"Dream Dino Heaven!" ("Fossil Fools"); Transliteration: "Yume no kyōryū tengoku!" (Japanese: 夢の恐竜天国！)	76	Yoshihisa Matsumoto; Hiroshi Harada	Written by : Mariko Kunisawa; Storyboarded by : Yoshihisa Matsumoto; Seiji Arihara	March 29, 2003	October 16, 2004
After finding out that dinosaurs have been extinct for millions of years, King Dedede and Escargoon order a mad scientist from N.M.E. to create their own. Everyone ends up swarmed by scientific mosquitos after escaping Dedede's treacherous amusement park – and their DNA samples are used to help the mad scientist create the ultimate dinosaurs. Copy Ability: Crash (debut)

=== Season 4 (2003) ===
No.	Title (English dub title)	Episode No. Dubbed Version	Directed by	Written by	Original release date	American air date
77	"Royal AcaDededemy" ("Dedede's Monsterpiece"); Transliteration: "Roiyaru akadededemī" (Japanese: ロイヤル・アカデデデミー)	77	Tameo Kohanawa	Written by : Sōji Yoshikawa; Storyboarded by : Tameo Kohanawa	April 5, 2003	October 23, 2004
King Dedede opens his own art museum, but he dislikes the imported paintings, so he orders a monster to make his own. Copy Ability: Paint (debut)
78	"Launching Escargon Robo!" ("Right Hand Robot"); Transliteration: "Hasshin! Esukarugon robo" (Japanese: 発進！エスカルゴン・ロボ)	78	Tarō Iwasaki	Written by : Chinatsu Hōjō; Storyboarded by : Tarō Iwasaki	April 19, 2003	October 30, 2004
After being worked into the ground too hard by King Dedede, Escargoon creates Escar-droid, a robot made to do his duties for him, but Dedede uses it to go after Kirby, leading it to be constantly destroyed and forcing Escargoon to rebuild it multiple times. Copy Ability: Bomb
79	"Bonkers is Here!" ("Goin' Bonkers"); Transliteration: "Bonkāsu arawaru!" (Japanese: ボンカースあらわる！)	79	Akira Mano	Written by : Chinatsu Hōjō; Storyboarded by : Akira Mano; Shinichi Tsuji	April 26, 2003	November 6, 2004
After King Dedede discovers that Bonkers, a runaway circus ape, wants to train with Kirby, he turns Bonkers into a monster. Copy Ability: Hammer
80	"Tonic! Drink Rhapsody" ("Power Ploy"); Transliteration: "Kyōsō! Dorinku kyōsōkyoku" (Japanese: 強壮！ドリンク狂想曲)	80	Masayuki Ōzeki	Written by : Yurie Tomonaga; Storyboarded by : Masayuki Ōzeki	May 3, 2003	November 13, 2004
King Dedede orders a drink to power up himself and the Cappies, but after seeing the effects and their consequences, Escargoon orders a drink to poop them out. Copy Ability: Stone
81	"Eep! The Untidy Woman" ("A Trashy Tale"); Transliteration: "Doki! Katazukerarenai onna" (Japanese: ドキッ！かたづけられない女)	81	Hiroyuki Yokoyama	Written by : Mariko Kunisawa; Storyboarded by : Masayuki Kojima	May 10, 2003	November 20, 2004
When King Dedede and Escargoon discover that Chief Bookem and Buttercup's house is a pigsty, they use this opportunity to humiliate them on public television. Meanwhile, so as not to deal with Dedede's own trashy habits, N.M.E. sends a trash-spitting monster to expel all of Dedede's garbage (whom he had sent to N.M.E.) onto Cappy Town. Copy Ability: Cleaning
82	"Combined Robot Cooker Z!" ("Cooking Up Trouble"); Transliteration: "Gattai robo ryourigā Z!" (Japanese: 合体ロボ・リョウリガーZ！)	82	Yoshihisa Matsumoto	Written by : Rima Nozoe; Storyboarded by : Yoshihisa Matsumoto	May 17, 2003	November 27, 2004
After Sir Ebrum cooks a delicious meal for his kids and Kirby, King Dedede starts a cooking contest for Male Cappies, and tricks them into buying parts made to build the SlicerDicer. Copy Ability: Spark
83	"Monster Teacher 3" ("Teacher's Threat"); Transliteration: "Majū kyōshi 3" (Japanese: 魔獣教師3)	83	Hiroshi Harada	Written by : Sōji Yoshikawa; Storyboarded by : Seiji Arihara	May 24, 2003	December 4, 2004
A new teacher comes to Cappy Town to teach at the Dedede Academy, but he's actually a contract monster. Copy Ability: Sword
84	"Curio's Hidden Treasure?" ("Mumbies Madness"); Transliteration: "Kyurio-shi no hihō?" (Japanese: キュリオ氏の秘宝？)	84	Tarō Iwasaki	Written by : Yurie Tomonaga; Storyboarded by : Tarō Iwasaki	May 31, 2003	December 11, 2004
King Dedede tricks Mr. Curio into opening a jar containing mummy-like creatures called Mumbies, which run rampant in Cappy Town before targeting Kirby. Copy Ability: Bomb
85	"Phantom Ultraviolet Rays!" ("A Sunsational Surprise" / "A Sunsational Puzzle"); Transliteration: "Maboroshi no Shigaisen!" (Japanese: まぼろしの紫外線！)	85	Masayuki Ōzeki	Written by : Sōji Yoshikawa; Storyboarded by : Masayuki Ōzeki	June 7, 2003	December 18, 2004
King Dedede buys air conditioners from N.M.E. to cool off the town when it gets too hot. Later, an ozone layer monster appears. Copy Ability: Jet, Bomb
86	"Disciple Showdown! Cook Nagoya" ("A Chow Challenge"); Transliteration: "Deshi taiketsu! Kokku nagoya" (Japanese: 弟子対決！コックナゴヤ)	86	Tameo Kohanawa	Written by : Chinatsu Hōjō; Storyboarded by : Tameo Kohanawa	June 14, 2003	May 28, 2005
A classmate of Kawasaki's past comes to visit him, but finds out that his cooking is sorely poor. Later, King Dedede holds a contest between Kawasaki and Nagoya, where the winner gets to keep Kawasaki's restaurant. Copy Ability: Cook
87	"Charge! The Selfish Army of Crows" ("Waste Management"); Transliteration: "Shūgeki! Karasu no katte gundan" (Japanese: 襲撃！カラスの勝手軍団)	87	Hiroyuki Yokoyama	Written by : Mariko Kunisawa; Storyboarded by : Aoi Kurihara	June 21, 2003	June 4, 2005
King Dedede hires a flock of crows to eat his garbage, but later they betray them and tell the crows to get lost. Later, the leader of the crows is turned into a monster, and returns to get revenge. Copy Ability: Wing (debut)
88	"Escargon Naked" ("Shell-Shocked"); Transliteration: "Hadaka no esukarugon" (Japanese: はだかのエスカルゴン)	88	Akira Mano	Written by : Chinatsu Hōjō; Storyboarded by : Yoshihiro Takamoto	June 28, 2003	June 11, 2005
King Dedede wants to see what's under Escargoon's shell, so he cracks it open with his hammer. After Tiff demands him to fix it, N.M.E. sends a monster shell over, turning Escargoon into Maimaigoon. Copy Ability: Hammer Note: The initial airing of this episode in the United States was preempted by This Week in Baseball by many Fox-affiliated stations, which make up the majority of stations carrying 4Kids TV. The episode was aired by many of these stations at another time that day or during the following week.
89	"Geek Cartoon! Fūmu of the Stars" ("Tooned Out"); Transliteration: "Otaanime! Hoshi no fūmutan" (Japanese: オタアニメ！星のフームたん)	89	Yoshihisa Matsumoto	Written by : Mariko Kunisawa; Sōji Yoshikawa; Storyboarded by : Yoshihisa Matsumoto	July 5, 2003	June 18, 2005
King Dedede and Escargoon order a trio of "professional animators" called otakings from N.M.E. to make a cartoon show (possibly a second season of Dedede: Comin' at Ya! from "Cartoon Buffoon"). Unfortunately, the nerds instead get an "interest" in Tiff when they see her from a clip of the first episode of DCAY, and decide to resort to drastic measures to make the show about her instead. Copy Ability: Spark
90	"Mad Run! Dedede Race" ("Born to Be Mild"); Transliteration: "Bakusō! Dedede rēsu" (Japanese: 爆走！デデデ・レース前編)	90	Hiroshi Harada; Tarō Iwasaki	Written by : Rima Nozoe; Storyboarded by : Takeru Yamazaki; Tarō Iwasaki	July 12, 2003	June 25, 2005
91	"Mad Run! Dedede Race" ("Born to Be Mild"); Transliteration: "Bakusō! Dedede rēsu" (Japanese: 爆走！デデデ・レース前編)	91	Hiroshi Harada; Tarō Iwasaki	Written by : Rima Nozoe; Storyboarded by : Takeru Yamazaki; Tarō Iwasaki	July 19, 2003	July 2, 2005
King Dedede befriends a biker gang terrorizing Cappy Town, who are looking for a mysterious old biker named Steppenwolf (revealed to be Melman at the end of the special). Dedede ultimately decides to hold a race to determine if the gang stays. Before he can race, Gus is kidnapped and locked in Castle Dedede's dungeon, forcing Gengu to race in his place. When Gengu (and later Gus, who is eventually freed and reluctantly joins the race) are struggling, Steppenwolf steps in. Copy Ability: Wheel
92	"Waddle Dees' Cuisine Revolution" ("Hunger Struck"); Transliteration: "Wadorudi no shokubunka daikakumei" (Japanese: ワドルディの食文化大革命)	92	Masayuki Ōzeki	Written by : Ai Shitayoshi; Storyboarded by : Masayuki Ōzeki	July 26, 2003 (original); July 30, 2003 (rerun)	July 30, 2005
When King Dedede finds out that his Waddle Dees' meals are costing him a fortune, he makes them eat less, resulting in a rebellion until he orders a cooking monster. Note: When this episode originally aired, the last ten seconds of the episode before the credits were cut out by a breaking news interruption about an earthquake that struck Japan. A rerun of the episode aired uncut on most TBS-affiliated stations between July 30 and August 1 that year. Copy Ability: Cook
93	"Kirby Appreciation Day!" ("D'Preciation Day"); Transliteration: "Kābī kansha no hi!" (Japanese: カービィ感謝の日！)	93	Hiroyuki Yokoyama	Written by : Yurie Tomonaga; Storyboarded by : Aoi Kurihara	August 2, 2003	August 6, 2005
King Dedede is upset by the fact that practically no one likes or appreciates him, and when Kirby flubs up an attempt to give him a present of appreciation (a watermelon which he half-ate), he lashes out by cancelling all the other appreciation days, replacing them with "Dis Days" (days devoted to attacking the person the Dis Day is devoted too), and getting revenge on Kirby by playing a prank involving explosive watermelons. This leads to the residents deciding that Dedede has gone too far, and teaching him a lesson by tricking him into thinking Kirby has died and holding a funeral for the latter. Copy Ability: Parasol
94	"Escaped Monster PhanPhan" ("Cowardly Creature"); Transliteration: "Dassō majū fanfan" (Japanese: 脱走魔獣ファンファン)	96	Tameo Kohanawa	Written by : Satoshi Yumi; Storyboarded by : Tameo Kohanawa	August 9, 2003	October 28, 2006
Escaped monster Phan Phan comes to Cappy Town, and Kirby becomes friends with it. Later King Dedede finds out about it and orders a trainer monster to turn PhanPhan into a real monster. Copy Ability: Throw (debut)
95	"Devil Kirby!" ("Frog Wild"); Transliteration: "Debiru kābī!" (Japanese: デビル・カービィ！)	97	Akira Mano	Written by : Chinatsu Hōjō; Storyboarded by : Seiji Arihara	August 16, 2003	November 4, 2006
Kirby becomes possessed by a Demon Frog who uses his powers to cause chaos in Cappy Town. Copy Ability: Fire
96	"Warp Star Crisis!" ("Air-Ride-in-Style"); Transliteration: "Wāpusutā no kiki!" (Japanese: ワープスターの危機！)	50	Hiroshi Harada; Yoshihisa Matsumoto	Written by : Sōji Yoshikawa; Mariko Kunisawa; Storyboarded by : Seiji Arihara; Yoshihisa Matsumoto	August 23, 2003	October 11, 2003
97	"Warp Star Crisis!" ("Air-Ride-in-Style"); Transliteration: "Wāpusutā no kiki!" (Japanese: ワープスターの危機！)	51	Hiroshi Harada; Yoshihisa Matsumoto	Written by : Sōji Yoshikawa; Mariko Kunisawa; Storyboarded by : Seiji Arihara; Yoshihisa Matsumoto	August 30, 2003	October 18, 2003
King Dedede kidnaps Tiff and Kirby is attacked by a gang of Air Riders. Kirby battles them while acquiring many abilities as well. N.M.E. is poised and ready to take out Kirby with the Air Ride machines. Note: In Japan, there was a contest held by CBC that encouraged viewers of the show to design their own copy ability concepts for the show, with the winning abilities (which are listed below) being featured as part of this episode. The contest was first announced in the "Pupupu Tsushin" segment at the end of the Japanese version of "Caterpillar Thriller", and entries were solicited from March 15 (the day of said broadcast) to April 25, 2003, with the winners announced in the "Pupupu Tsushin" segments of both "D'Preciation Day" and the first half of this special. Copy Ability: Baton (debut), Water (debut), Iron (debut), Top (debut), Crash
98	"Take Off! Battleship Halberd" ("Cappy Town Down"); Transliteration: "Hasshin! Senkan harubādo" (Japanese: 発進！戦艦ハルバード)	98	Tarō Iwasaki	Written by : Sōji Yoshikawa; Storyboarded by : Mitsuo Kusakabe	September 13, 2003	November 25, 2006
Meta Knight reveals his secret weapon, Battleship Halberd, and, with the aid of several Cappies, begins the journey to N.M.E.'s fortress. Copy Ability: Crash
99	"Destruction! Nightmare's Great Fortress" ("Combat Kirby"); Transliteration: "Gekimetsu! Naitomea daiyōsai" (Japanese: 撃滅！ナイトメア大要塞)	99	Hiroyuki Yokoyama	Written by : Sōji Yoshikawa; Storyboarded by : Aoi Kurihara	September 20, 2003	December 2, 2006
Kirby battles Nightmare's powerful Heavy Lobster to protect Halberd, and the Halberd, aided by three friendly Destrayers piloted by past friends, begins its assault. Copy Ability: Cook, Ice
100	"Fly! Kirby of the Stars" ("Fright to the Finish"); Transliteration: "Tobe! Hoshi no kābī" (Japanese: 飛べ！星のカービィ)	100	Masayuki Ōzeki	Written by : Sōji Yoshikawa; Storyboarded by : Naoyuki Kuzuya	September 27, 2003	December 9, 2006
Kirby falls asleep in Nightmare's realm and battles him once and for all. Copy Ability: Bomb, Fire, Star Rod (debut)

== Short (2008) ==
An 8-minute short episode, produced wholly in 3D computer animation, was initially released in 2008 as a 4D feature at the Tokyo Dome City Toys Kingdom. It was then released worldwide via Nintendo Video on Nintendo 3DS in 2012, split into two parts.

No.	Title (English dub title)	Directed by	Written by	Storyboarded by	Original air date	American air date
101	"Kirby of the Stars: Take it Down! The Crustacean Monster Ebizou" ("Kirby 3D"); Transliteration: "Hoshi no Kābī Taose! Kōkaku Majū Ebizō" (Japanese: 星のカービィ 倒せ！甲殻魔獣エビゾウ)	Sōji Yoshikawa	Sōji Yoshikawa	Sōji Yoshikawa	September 20, 2008	January 14, 2012 (part 1); January 24, 2012 (part 2)
Kirby battles Lobzilla. Copy Ability: Fire, Kabuki (debut)
