= Sōji Yoshikawa =

Japanese anime director

- 吉川 惣司
- Born: February 22, 1947 (age 79); Tokyo, Japan
- Occupations: Animation director; Scriptwriter; Storyboard artist; Animator; Character designer; Stage director; Novelist
- Years active: 1963–present
- Known for: Lupin the 3rd: The Mystery of Mamo; Kirby: Right Back at Ya!

Sōji Yoshikawa (吉川 惣司, Yoshikawa Sōji; February 22, 1947 in Tokyo) is a Japanese anime director, scriptwriter, animator, character designer, as well as a stage director and novelist. He has occasionally worked under the aliases Kazumi Takahashi (高橋 和美, Takahashi Kazumi), Kyōdō Oda (小田 経堂, Oda Kyōdō), and Haruka Kyō (京 春香, Kyō Haruka).

His best known works as a director are Lupin the 3rd: The Mystery of Mamo and Kirby: Right Back at Ya!, as a scriptwriter are Future Boy Conan and Armored Trooper Votoms, and as a character designer is Fang of the Sun Dougram.

He has played most of the roles in anime production, from animator, episode director, storyboard artist, scriptwriter to director, and has directed each production process. In addition to anime, he also created the original story, wrote the script, directed the play, and served as general director for the Theater Company Hikōsen. This began when Masaaki Ōsumi, the director of the 1969 anime TV series Moomin, asked him to help out with the troupe. He also worked as a novelist, mainly on novelizations and spin-offs of animation works.

In an interview with Yasuo Ōtsuka for the Lupin III Perfect Book: Complete Collector's Edition, he cites Yoshikawa as a representative member of the Japanese anime world, along with Hayao Miyazaki, Isao Takahata, and Osamu Dezaki.

== Early life ==
He was a big anime fan from the beginning, making animation with an 8mm camera. He was also a fan of manga artist Osamu Tezuka. He has been a fan of science fiction since he read Shōnen Shōjo Sekai Kagaku Bōken Zenshū by Kodansha when he was a kid.

== Career ==
A fan of Osamu Tezuka's works, when Yoshikawa was a sophomore in high school, he saw a "Mushi Production's first batch of animators wanted" news article and applied for the job, which led him to enter the anime industry. He originally planned to go to art school, but dropped out of high school to join Mushi Productions. He then worked as an animator on Japan's first anime television series Astro Boy.

In 1964, Yoshikawa participated in the founding of Art Fresh with Gisaburō Sugii and Osamu Dezaki. After becoming independent, he continued to participate as an animator in Mushi Production's Works, which Art Fresh was involved in, such as Gokū no Daibōken. After that, he began to participate not only in works produced by Mushi Productions, but also in works produced by Tokyo Movie and A Production, where Hayao Miyazaki and Isao Takahata worked. He has worked as an episode director and storyboard artist on works directed by Tadao Nagahama, Masaaki Ōsumi, Dezaki, Miyazaki, etc., including Star of the Giants, Moomin, Ashita no Joe, Lupin the 3rd Part I, and Future Boy Conan, and made his directorial debut with Tensai Bakabon.

In 1978, at the age of 31, he directed the first Lupin III film, The Mystery of Mamo. While Miyazaki's second Lupin film, The Castle of Cagliostro suffered at the box office when it was released, this film was a huge hit with distribution revenue (Note: The distribution revenues are different from the box office revenue common in Japan today. It is the share of the distribution company that remains after subtracting the share of the film exhibition company from the box office revenue.) of 900 million yen. However, due to the low social status of animation in Japan at the time, this hit did not lead to an increase in his subsequent work. Later, with the rise in popularity of Miyazaki and Cagliostro, this film became neglected, but with the spread of the Internet, the film began to be reevaluated through word-of-mouth and gained a reputation equal to that of Cagliostro.

Yoshikawa participated in and provided scripts for many Sunrise robot animations directed by Yoshiyuki Tomino and Ryōsuke Takahashi in the late 1970s and 1980s. He was initially scheduled to take over as director for Combat Mecha Xabungle. However, he requested to step down due to his busy schedule, and only participated in writing the script, with Tomino taking his place as director. He was deeply involved in the story as the main writer for Armored Trooper Votoms. In an interview, Yoshikawa said that he wanted to do what he left undone in The Mystery of Mamo. According to Takahashi, the main character, Chirico Cuvie, reflects quite a bit of Yoshikawa's personality.

Yoshikawa was the chief director of Kirby: Right Back at Ya!, an anime version of the game Kirby series, which aired from 2001 to 2003. The anime was produced by A-Un Entertainment (later renamed Dyna-Method Inc.), a CG studio where Yoshikawa was a senior director and board member. One of the reasons that the 100th episode of the Kirby: Right Back at Ya! anime contained some problems, inconsistencies, and heavy-handedness in the plot and development is that Yoshikawa, who wrote the final episode, learned that his wife was in critical condition at the time and had to rush through the script and leave it in incomplete form in order to be present for her dying moments.

== Works ==
=== Anime television series ===
- Astro Boy (1963 TV series) (1963-1966) - Animation
- Shin Takarajima (1965) - Animation
- Son Gokū ga Hajimaruyō Kōfū Daimaō no Maki (1966) - Animation
- Gokū no Daibōken (1967) - Animation
- Fight Da!! Pyūta (1968) - Episode director/Animation
- Star of the Giants (1968-1971) - Episode director/Storyboard
- Moomin (1969 TV series) (1969-1970) - Storyboard
- Ashita no Joe (1970-1971) - Episode director
- Tensai Bakabon (1971 TV series) (1971-1972) - Director of the first half of the series
- Lupin the Third Part I (1971-1972) - Storyboard (ep. 1 (Note: As Kazumi Takahashi.) and the last ep. 23)
- Kunimatsu-sama no Otoridai! (1971-1972) – Episode director
- Anime Documental: Road to Munich (1971-1972) - Animation director
- Doraemon (1973 TV series) (1973) – Storyboard
- Little Wansa (1973) - Episode director
- Kōya no Shōnen Isamu (1973-1974) - Storyboard
- Zero Tester (1973-1974) - Script
- Karate Master (1973-1974) - Storyboard
- Aim for the Ace! (1973 TV series) (1973-1974) - Storyboard
- Samurai Giants (1973-1974) - Storyboard
- Hoshi no Ko Chobin (1974) - Script
- La Seine no Hoshi (1975) - Script
- Gamba no Bouken (1975) - Script
- Time Bokan (1975-1976) - Script
- The Adventures of Pepero (1975-1976) - Script (Note: As Kyōdō Oda.)
- Gaiking (1976-1977) - Script
- UFO Warrior Dai Apolon (1976) - Script
- Blocker Gundan 4 Machine Blaster (1976-1977) - Script
- Paul's Miraculous Adventure (1976-1977) - Script
- Robokko Beeton (1976-1977) - Script
- Ore wa Teppei (1977-1978) - Script
- Wakusei Robo Danguard Ace (1977-1978) - Script
- Chogattai Majutsu Robo Ginguiser (1977) - Script
- Invincible Super Man Zambot 3 (1977-1978) - Script
- Invincible Steel Man Daitarn 3 (1978-1979) – Script
- Future Boy Conan (1978) - Script
- The Rose of Versailles (1979-1980) - Storyboard
- The Ultraman (1979-1980) - Script
- Cyborg 009 (1973 TV series) (1979-1980) - Script/Storyboard
- Marco Polo no Bōken (1979-1980) - Script
- Fang of the Sun Dougram (1981-1983) - Character design/storyboard (Note: As Haruka Kyō.)
- Belle and Sebastian (1981-1982) - Script
- Shiroi Kiba: White Fang Story (1982) - Director/storyboard
- Game Center Arashi (1982) - Script
- Combat Mecha Xabungle (1982-1983) - Script
- The Mysterious Cities of Gold (1982-1983) - Script
- Armored Trooper Votoms (1983-1984) - Script
- The Yearling (1983-1985) - Script
- Galactic Patrol Lensman (1984-1985) - Script
- Panzer World Galient (1984-1985) - Script
- Bosco Adventure (1986-1987) - Script
- Kissyfur (1986-1988) - Japanese side Director/Script
- City Hunter (1987-1988) - Script
- Star Street: The Adventures of the Star Kids (1989-1990) - Japanese side Director
- The Wonderful Galaxy of Oz (1992-1993) - General director/Character design supervisor/Head writer
- E.Y.E.S. of Mars (1993) - Script
- Bit the Cupid (1995-1996) - Head writer/Script (all episodes)
- Monkey Magic (1999-2000) - Head writer/Script (all episodes)
- Kirby: Right Back at Ya! (2001-2003) - General director/Head writer/Script/Storyboard

=== Anime films ===
- Lupin the 3rd: The Mystery of Mamo (1978) - Director/Script/Storyboard/Character design (partial)
- Lensman (1984) - Script
- Mother: Saigo no Shojō Eve (1993) - Script

=== Short anime films ===
- Garon (2013) - Director/Script

=== OVA ===
- Armored Trooper Votoms: The Last Red Shoulder (1985) - Script
- Armored Trooper Votoms - The Red Shoulder Document: Roots of Ambition (1988) - Script
- Umi no Yami, Tsuki no Kaze (1989) - Dramatization
- Armored Trooper Votoms: Shining Heresy (1994) - Script (all episodes)
- The Silent Service (1995-1998) - Script
- Armored Trooper Votoms: Pailsen Files (2007-2008) - Head writer/Script

=== Stage ===
- Star Guardian (1986) - Original story/Script/General director
- Tanoshii Moomin Ikka - Script
- Snow White and the Seven Dwarfs - Script
- The Wonderful Wizard of Oz - Director/Script

== Bibliography ==
- Sci-Fi New Century Lensman (Novelization of anime film)
- Galactic Patrol Lensman 2: Valeria planet rescue operation (Novelization of TV anime series)
- Armored Trooper Votoms The First Red Shoulder (Novelization of OVA)
- Armored Trooper Votoms The Last Red Shoulder (Novelization of OVA)
- Armored Trooper Votoms: Pailsen Files (Novelization of OVA)
- Mother: Saigo no Shojō Eve - Original Story (Novelization of anime film)
- Mearī Aningu no Bōken Kyōryūgaku wo Hiraita Onna Kasekiya (メアリー・アニングの冒険 恐竜学をひらいた女化石屋, The Adventures of Mary Anning: The female fossil digger who paved the way for dinosaur studies) (co-authored with Michiko Yajima)
