= Galactic Patrol Lensman =

Science fiction anime television series based on Lensman by E. E. Smith

GALACTIC PATROL レンズマン
- Created by: E. E. Smith
- Anime television series
- Directed by: Hiroshi Fukutomi
- Written by: Masaki Tsuji; Sōji Yoshikawa; Haruya Yamazaki; Kō Takashina; Mitsuru Majima; Seiko Watanabe
- Music by: Comsos
- Studio: MK Company; Madhouse
- Original network: ANN (ABC)
- Original run: October 6, 1984 – March 30, 1985
- Episodes: 25
- Anime film

Lensman: Power of the Lens (American film adaptation)
- Directed by: Ahmed Agrama
- Produced by: Frank Agrama
- Written by: Carl Macek
- Music by: Peter Davison
- Licensed by: Harmony Gold USA
- Released: 1987
- Runtime: 100 minutes
- Other versions
- Lensman: Secret of The Lens (1984)

Galactic Patrol Lensman (GALACTIC PATROL レンズマン, GALACTIC PATROL Renzuman) is a Japanese anime television series based on the Lensman novels by E. E. Smith. The 25-episode series aired from October 6, 1984 to August 8, 1985 in Japan.

Harmony Gold USA created an English dubbed compilation of episodes 1–3 and 5–6 in a heavily edited form, which they released under the title Lensman: Power of the Lens. The other episodes were never dubbed into English. This compilation is no longer available on video, although it was available in the UK on a prerecorded PAL-VHS cassette in the late 1980s. A Catalan dubbed version of the series was broadcast in Catalonia, Spain by TV3 in 1994.

Despite sharing the names of characters and organizations, as well as central themes common to the books, the artistic freedom resulted in a final product completely different from the source material. Although it was produced with the knowledge and consent of Smith's estate, the executors were displeased with the result that for several years they rejected any other suggestions of adaptation.

== Characters ==
- Admiral Haynes: Voiced by: Hidekatsu Shibata (Japanese); Mike Reynolds (English)
- Kimball Kinnison: Voiced by: Toshio Furukawa (Japanese); Kerrigan Mahan (English)
- LaVerne Thorndyke: Voiced by: Kaneto Shiozawa (Japanese); Dave Mallow (English)
- Sol: Voiced by: Tomiko Suzuki (Japanese); Theodore Lehmann (English)
- Peter VanBuskirk: Voiced by: Banjō Ginga (Japanese); Michael McConnohie (English)
- Worsel of Velantia: Voiced by: Keiichi Noda (Japanese); Steve Kramer (English)
- Clarissa MacDougall: Voiced by: Mami Koyama (Japanese); Melanie McQueen (English)
- Henry Henerson: Voiced by: Hideyuki Hori
- Fritz von Hohendorff: Voiced by: Masaharu Satō
- Tregonsee: Voiced by: Naoki Tatsuta
- Lord Helmuth: Voiced by: Seizō Katō
- Romulon: Voiced by: Eiji Kanie
- Flick: Voiced by: Hiroko Emori
- Zelda: Voiced by: Hiromi Tsuru
- Morou: Voiced by: Hiroshi Ōtake
- Neizel: Voiced by: Kouji Totani
- Rana: Voiced by: Mari Keiko
- Thomas: Voiced by: Michitaka Kobayashi
- Diane: Voiced by: Mika Ishizawa

== Production ==
Vintage: October 6, 1984 to August 8, 1985
Original creator: E. E. Smith
English version: Harmony Gold USA, Inc. (1987)
Executive producer: Sōji Yoshikawa
Director: Hiroshi Fukutomi
Key animation: Shinya Ohira, Yasuomi Umetsu
Theme song performance:

Opening theme: "On The Wing" by Eri Kojima
Ending theme: "Paradise (パラダイス)" by Yudai Suzuki

== Reception ==
The Encyclopedia of Science Fiction described Galactic Patrol Lensman as a moderately entertaining but largely unmemorable space opera, provided viewers were willing to overlook its substantial departures from E. E. Smith's original Lensman novels. It highlighted the adaptation's deliberate resemblance to Star Wars, including changes to the characters' ages, appearances and roles, and the greater prominence of a cute robot sidekick. The encyclopedia also noted that the series was an alternative retelling rather than a sequel to the 1984 Lensman film, with a different origin story for Kimball Kinnison and greater emphasis on the conflict between the Arisians and Eddorians. It observed that the series was commercially unsuccessful, and was cancelled with only 25 of its planned 39 episodes produced.
