= Kirby: Right Back at Ya! =

2001 anime television series

- Japanese promotional poster
- 星のカービィ
- Created by: Masahiro Sakurai
- Directed by: Sōji Yoshikawa (chief); Mitsuo Kusakabe (animation)
- Series composition: Sōji Yoshikawa
- Character designer: Miyuki Shimabukuro
- Music by: Akira Miyagawa
- Country of origin: Japan
- Original language: Japanese
- No. of episodes: 100 (list of episodes)

Production
- Studio: Studio Sign
- Producers: Satoru Iwata; Taihei Yamanashi; Seiichi Hirano; Takeyuki Okazaki
- Production companies: Chubu-Nippon Broadcasting; Dentsu; A-UN Entertainment

Original release
- Networks: JNN (CBC, TBS)
- Release: October 6, 2001 – September 27, 2003

Kirby: Right Back at Ya! (Note: Known in Japan as Kirby of the Stars (Japanese: 星のカービィ, Hepburn: Hoshi no Kābī)) is a Japanese anime television series based on HAL Laboratory's Kirby franchise. Produced by Chubu-Nippon Broadcasting, Dentsu and A-UN Entertainment and animated by Studio Sign, it was directed by Sōji Yoshikawa, who also handled anime composition, and Mitsuo Kusakabe, with Miyuki Shimabukuro as character designer, Kazuo Iimura as chief animation director and Akira Miyagawa as music composer. The anime aired on CBC and TBS in Japan from October 2001 to September 2003, with 100 episodes. In the United States, the anime aired on FoxBox from September 2002 to December 2006, with episodes being released in Europe on the Kirby TV Channel for the Wii and on Kirby's Dream Collection, also for the Wii.

The anime follows Kirby, who possesses the ability to temporarily gain magical powers by sucking up their owners. After crash-landing on the planet of Popstar and befriending siblings Tiff and Tuff, Kirby and his friends fight to bring down the evil emperor Nightmare while evading King Dedede and his assistant Escargoon, who seek to eliminate Kirby using monsters provided by NightMare Enterprises.

== Plot ==
Long ago, the emperor of darkness known as Nightmare created armies of monsters and sent them across the universe in order to conquer it, but over time, some began to rebel against him. Star Warriors, which included Sir Meta Knight, fought for good and formed the Galaxy Soldier Army to fight against evil and defeat Nightmare. Despite their efforts, they were unable to defeat his endless supply of monsters, and the surviving Star Warriors retreated to the edges of the universe, where they still sought to defeat Nightmare. Nightmare established the corporate empire NightMare Enterprises (Holy Nightmare Co. in the Japanese version), which created monsters and expanded its power by selling them to villains and avaricious people throughout the universe.

Some time later, Kirby was born as part of the next generation of Star Warriors, intended to gain the strength needed to fight Nightmare while sleeping in a spaceship. However, the spaceship has the ability to automatically travel to the planet where monsters are located. After detecting the presence of monsters on the planet of Popstar, Kirby's spaceship awakens him 200 years ahead of schedule and crash-lands in Cappy Town (Pupu Village in the Japanese version), where Kirby befriends siblings Tiff and Tuff (Fumu and Bun in the Japanese version) and the residents of Cappy Town. With their help, he fights the monsters to one day defeat Nightmare. As in the games, Kirby can inhale enemies to temporarily gain their powers and transform into forms such as Fire Kirby and Sword Kirby.

The ruler of Dream Land, King Dedede, is suspicious of Kirby, and, along with his right-hand man Escargoon, often attempts to eliminate him with monsters provided by the company. Nightmare is ultimately defeated when Kirby and Tiff confront him in a dream and Kirby swallows the Warp Star to become Star Rod Kirby, using the Star Rod to defeat him.

== Characters ==
Kirby (カービィ, Kābī)
Voiced by: Makiko Ohmoto (Japanese); Amy Birnbaum (certain lines) (English)
Kirby is a young Star Warrior spoken of in legend as Kirby of the Stars, as a Star Warrior's ship is designed to go where monsters are. Although he was supposed to sleep in a spaceship to gain the strength needed to face Nightmare, his ship detects the presence of monsters on the planet of Popstar and crashlands there, causing him to be awakened 200 years earlier than planned. As a result of being awakened prematurely, he is a child and does not speak, mainly saying "poyo". However, he can speak simple words, such as the names of people and food. Kirby can inhale enemies to temporarily gain their powers and transform into various forms: twenty-four are from the games and five, Baton, Water, Iron, Top and Kabuki, were created for the anime.
Tiff (フーム, Fūmu)
Voiced by: Sayuri Yoshida (Japanese); Kerry Williams (English)
Tiff is the 12-year-old daughter of the Cabinet Minister who has lived in Dedede's castle her whole life because of her parents' wealth. She is intelligent for her age, with most of her interest being in the environment and her favorite subject being marine biology, but can be short-tempered. She is the only one who can summon Kirby's Warp Star when he is in danger, as Meta Knight states that Kirby cannot keep it safe himself and she can control it because she truly cares for him.
Tuff (ブン, Bun)
Voiced by: Rika Komatsu (Japanese); Kayzie Rogers (English)
Tuff is Tiff's 8-year-old younger brother who is the polar-opposite of her, preferring to play outside rather than read books. Although Tuff often causes trouble with his mischief, he is well-meaning.
Tokkori (トッコリ)
Voiced by: Fujiko Takimoto (Japanese); Kevin Kolack (English)
Tokkori is a bird that lives near Kirby's house and was believed to be a descendant of the royal bird Lord James Coleet, who belonged to the pirate Captain Kick, but this is later discovered to be false.
King Dedede (デデデ大王, Dedede Daiō)
Voiced by: Kenichi Ogata (Japanese); Ted Lewis (English)
King Dedede is the self-proclaimed ruler of Dream Land, who is greedy and jealous of Kirby and often attempts to eliminate him using monsters purchased from NightMare Enterprises. While he initially seeks to defeat Kirby, he later focuses more on trying to banish him from Cappy Town or ruin his reputation. Despite this, he is gentle at heart.
Escargoon (エスカルゴン, Esukarugon)
Voiced by: Naoki Tatsuta (Japanese); Ted Lewis (English)
Escargoon is an anthropomorphic snail who lived on a farm with his mother before leaving to make it big and began working for Dedede as his assistant. He truly cares for him, despite the harsh treatment he receives from him. While he usually goes along with what Dedede wants and helps him with his schemes, he is implied to be acting evil out of a desire to get his approval.
Customer Service (カスタマーサービス, Kasutamā Sābisu)
Voiced by: Banjō Ginga (Japanese); Dan Green (English)
The public face of NightMare Enterprises, who handles much of its sales and advertising from Nightmare's Fortress. His portrayal differs between the original Japanese version and the English dub. In the original Japanese version, he is depicted as being a polite Japanese salesperson who often uses honorific language, even when insulting customers, while in the English dub, he acts like a stereotypical "slimy used-car salesman" and often uses slang.
Meta Knight (メタナイト, Meta Naito)
Voiced by: Atsushi Kisaichi (Japanese); Eric Stuart (English)
Meta Knight is among those who work for King Dedede along with his followers Sword Knight and Blade Knight. However, it is later revealed that he is a Star Warrior like Kirby and one of the sole survivors of the war with Nightmare. He wields the sacred sword Galaxia, which only a select few can wield, and is the second strongest Star Warrior in the galaxy after Kirby. Despite working for Dedede, he is an ally of Kirby and his friends, but until the third episode is portrayed as being neither friend nor foe.
Nightmare (ナイトメア, Naitomea)/eNeMeE
Voiced by: Banjō Ginga (Japanese); Andrew Rannells (English)
Nightmare is the main antagonist of the anime and president of NightMare Enterprises, who previously attempted to conquer the universe with his monstrous armies until the Star Warriors began to oppose him in a war that killed most of them, with Meta Knight being among the survivors. Nightmare appears in shadow for most of the anime, appearing in his full form only in the penultimate episode and the anime finale. He thrives on suffering, creating monsters to sell in his company and using them in his armies to continue his conquest of the universe.

== Episodes ==
Season	Episodes	Originally aired			
Season	Episodes	First aired (Japan)	Last aired (Japan)	First aired (USA)	Last aired (USA)
1	26	October 6, 2001	March 30, 2002	September 14, 2002	September 16, 2006
2	25	April 6, 2002	October 5, 2002	December 7, 2002	September 23, 2006
3	25	October 12, 2002	March 29, 2003	September 6, 2003	October 16, 2004
4	24	April 5, 2003	September 27, 2003	October 23, 2004	November 4, 2006
Short	1	September 20, 2008	September 20, 2008	January 14, 2012	January 24, 2012

== Production ==
The original creator of the franchise, Masahiro Sakurai, was in charge of supervising the anime, with planning and production beginning around 2000, coinciding with the development of Super Smash Bros. Melee. In an interview with Famitsu, Sakurai stated, "I've had a lot of involvement in the production of the animation. We aim to create an anime that both parents and children can enjoy just as much as the games. In the beginning, Kirby started out as a game that even beginners could enjoy. I think that spirit has been carried over to the anime as well." He became friends with the cast and staff, and they held a birthday party for him when the day of voice recording for the final episodes happened to coincide with it.

Chief director Sōji Yoshikawa spoke about the challenges faced by the anime's creators, expressing concern that most anime adaptations of video games did not work well, but felt that it could be successful. He added that it was difficult to have a main character who did not speak, as well as creating unique settings and characters. Kirby was unusual because it had no humans in the cast, and he likened it to the Finnish anime Moomins, which was popular in Japan.

Initially, the anime' background music was original music composed by Akira Miyagawa. However, from episode 33 onwards, music from previous Kirby games was used, mainly from Kirby's Dream Land and Kirby Super Star, as well as Kirby Air Ride around the time of its release, arranged to fit the anime' style. Kirby Air Ride also featured some songs from the anime, with the song "Checker Knights" later appearing in Super Smash Bros. Brawl, with Miyagawa credited. Some arranged songs were included on the Kirby & the Amazing Mirror Sound+ music CD. After the anime ended, some of its character and copy ability-related traits were later used in the games.

The anime used 3DCG rendering for characters such as Kirby, King Dedede and Escargoon, which was created in Softimage 3D and handled by A-UN Entertainment, with employees from Overlord Inc. moving to A-UN to help with production. By applying the advanced synthesis technology developed by Nintendo and HAL Laboratory in the development of video game software to the production of the anime, they were able to better combine hand-drawn and 3DCG animation. For some episodes that Studio Comet aided in the production of as animation production support, Studio Comet's CG department produced some of the 3DCG segments independently. While many anime use digital technology primarily to save money and shorten production time, the anime used it to give the characters more expressiveness. In the ending credits of the final episode, the names of most of the people involved in A-UN's 3DCG production up to that point appeared in the 3DCG-related staff section.

Before the anime aired on TV, a short episode was produced as a pilot film produced prior to the start of the anime's production, with a DVD including it distributed as a supplement in the game magazine Famitsu Cube+Advance (a now defunct sister magazine to Famitsu) to celebrate the release of Kirby Air Ride in Japan. The episode was animated entirely in 3DCG, except for the backgrounds and some effects, and used Kirby's design from the Kirby's Adventure era. Compared to the main anime, it was more faithful to the original games, featuring boss characters from the games that did not appear in the main anime and Meta Knight as an enemy.

=== 4Kids adaptation ===
The English dub often removed any visible text.

The anime was dubbed into English for North America under the title Kirby: Right Back at Ya! and it was licensed by 4Kids Entertainment. The official English website featured a manga based on the anime, reminiscent of American comics at the time. In the adaptation process, the series was heavily re-edited: text and scenes were edited or removed to remove content deemed inappropriate for American and Canadian audiences. The dub also changed names of characters, such as the soldiers of the Galaxy Soldier Army being referred to as Star Warriors, and replaced the Japanese score with music produced locally and independently at 4Kids, including songs from anime that had previously aired on 4Kids TV. The final episodes, episodes 96 to 100 in Japan, were not aired on TV until late in the anime's run, and were instead released on DVD as the film Kirby: Fright to the Finish!

Some episodes were aired out of their original order, sometimes to air a holiday-themed episode closer to that holiday or to coincide with an event happening at the time. For example, "A Novel Approach", which parodied Harry Potter, was moved to coincide with the release of one of the books. Some episodes were aired earlier to promote new Kirby games, such as episodes 96 and 97, "Crisis of the Warp Star", which were aired near the middle as the television special "Air Ride in Style" to promote Kirby Air Ride. Since these episodes were at a major climax in the anime, some scenes were edited to make it appear as if Tiff and Kirby were having a "prophetic dream" rather than the events actually happening. However, the episodes were placed in the original order and unedited on the Kirby: Fright to the Finish! DVD.

Michael Haigney stated in an interview that the Fox Network refused to air the episode "A Dental Dilemma" because it depicted dentists in a bad light and could scare children, despite being meant to encourage them to brush their teeth and go to a dentist if they thought they had a cavity. This applied to all other countries that used the 4Kids dub. The episode was eventually dubbed, but aired as part of the third season along with other episodes in the line-up.

=== Broadcast history ===
The anime aired on CBC and TBS from October 6, 2001, to September 27, 2003, with 100 episodes. After a preview on September 1, 2002, 4Kids aired the anime on 4Kids TV, formerly known as FoxBox, from September 14, 2002, to late 2006.

The anime began rebroadcasting in Japan on June 28, 2007, on the Tokyo MX station and in the US on June 21, 2008, ending along with all other 4Kids shows on December 27, 2008. On June 6, 2009, Kirby, along with Teenage Mutant Ninja Turtles: Fast Forward, was rebroadcast in the US on The CW4Kids. The anime was available on 4Kids's video on demand service and www.4Kids.tv, but was removed from the 4Kids TV website in October 2009, as 4Kids Entertainment held the rights to the anime until September 2009. A moderator on the 4Kids forums stated in November 2009 that 4Kids no longer held the license. Since May 21, 2009, the Tokyo MX website had stated that the anime was removed from the air.

Since 2009, the anime was available for streaming via the Wii no Ma channel for the Wii in Japan, with each episode worth 100 Wii Points, but on April 30, 2012, Nintendo terminated broadcast of the Wii no Ma channel. On June 23, 2011, the anime was made available in Europe and Australia audiences on the Wii as the Kirby TV Channel, which expired on December 15, 2011. This service returned in April 2012. A special CG animated episode, "Take it Down!! The Crustacean Monster Ebizou" (倒せ!!甲殻魔獣エビゾウ, Taose!! Kōkaku Majū Ebizou), was released for the Wii no Ma service in Japan on August 9, 2009. A stereoscopic 3D version of the episode was streamed internationally in two parts on the Nintendo 3DS' Nintendo Video service in January 2012, under the title "Kirby 3D". Three episodes were included in the Kirby 20th anniversary compilation game Kirby's Dream Collection for Wii.

=== Theme songs ===
Japanese

- Openings
1. "Kirby★March" (カービィ★マーチ, Kābii★māchi)
  - October 6, 2001 – February 22, 2003
  - Lyricists: Shinji Miyake & Jian Hong / Composer & Arranger: Akira Miyagawa / Singer: Xiang Qi
  - Episode Range: 1-71
2. "Kirby!" (カービィ！, Kābii!)
  - March 1 – September 27, 2003
  - Lyricist: Shōko Fujibayashi / Composer: Kazuto Satō / Arrangers: Hiromi Suzuki & Yasumasa Satō / Singer: Hiroko Asakawa
  - Episode Range: 72–100
- Endings
1. "First You Draw a Circle" (きほんはまる, Kihon wa maru)
  - October 6, 2001 – February 22, 2003
  - Lyricist: Miwako Saitō / Composer: Akira Miyagawa / Arranger: Yō Shibano / Singer: Xiang Qi
  - Episode Range: 1-71
2. "Kirby☆Step!" (カービィ☆ステップ！, Kābii☆suteppu!)
  - March 1 – September 27, 2003
  - Lyricist: Yuka Kondō / Composer & Arranger: Akira Miyagawa / Singer: Konishiki Yasokichi
  - Episode Range: 72–100

English
"Kirby Kirby Kirby!" (Also used in the North American version of Donkey Konga as "Kirby: Right Back At Ya!")
- Composed by Ralph Schuckett, Manny Corallo, Wayne Sharpe, John VanTongeren, Louis Cortelezzi, Rusty Andrews, Peter Scaturro, Norman J. Grossfeld, Anne Pope, Liz Magro, John Sands, John Siegler, and Jonathan Lattif

== Home video releases ==
=== Japan ===
Throughout 2002–2004, all 100 episodes were released for rental on VHS and DVD by Avex Mode.

On March 14, 2023, HAL Laboratory self-distributed a digitally remastered 10-disc Blu-ray boxset containing all 100 episodes in Japan. Bonus features include the English dub for the first episode, the original pilot, and creditless openings and closings, while the set included a booklet containing interviews with the voice cast and storyboards for the first episode. The set was exclusively sold on the official Kirby online store for a limited time.

=== North America ===
The anime was released on DVD and VHS in the United States by 4Kids Entertainment Home Video and distributed by Funimation. The companies first released the anime in three volumes on VHS and DVD (alongside a fourth volume that was cancelled), each containing three episodes:

Release name	Episodes	Release date	Source
Kirby Comes to Cappy Town	"Kirby Comes to Cappy Town" "A Blockbuster Battle" "Kirby's Duel Role"	November 12, 2002	
A Dark and Stormy Knight	"A Dark and Stormy Knight" "Beware of Whispy Woods" "Un-Reality TV"	January 7, 2003	
Kirby's Egg-Cellent Adventure	"Kirby's Egg-Cellent Adventure" "Curio's Curious Discovery" "The Fofa Factor"	November 4, 2003	

In June 2005, 4Kids and Funimation released an edit of the last five episodes of the anime combined into a movie, called Kirby: Fright to the Finish!!.

Release name	Release date	Source
Kirby: Fright to the Finish!!	June 14, 2005	

Also in 2005, 4Kids and Funimation released two DVDs as part of 4Kids' "DVDouble-Shot" anime, which each contained two episodes. For Kirby, each DVD focused on a specific copy ability:

Release name	Episodes	Release date	Source
Ice Kirby	"The Chill Factor" "Dedede's Snow Job"	November 14, 2005	
Cook Kirby	"Hot Shot Chef" "The Big Taste Test"	November 14, 2005	

In 2008, 4Kids and Funimation released two seven-episode DVDs which altogether made up the first fourteen episodes of the anime.

Release name	Episodes	Release date	Source
Kirby's Adventures in Cappy Town	"Kirby Comes to Cappy Town" "A Blockbuster Battle" "Kirby's Duel Role" "A Dark & Stormy Knight" "Beware: Whispy Woods!" "Un-Reality TV" "Kirby's Egg-cellent Adventure"	February 19, 2008	
Cappy New Year & Other Kirby Adventures	"Curio's Curious Discovery" "The Fofa Factor" "Hail to the Chief" "The Big Taste Test" "Escargoon Squad" "Cappy New Year" "The Pillow Case"	December 9, 2008	

=== Other ===
On May 6, 2010, the first season was released on DVD in Taiwan.

Three episodes from the anime ("Kirby Comes to Cappy Town", "Crusade for the Blade", and "Waddle While You Work") were included in the 2012 video game compilation Kirby's Dream Collection.

== Reception ==
David Sanchez from GameZone found the anime "awesome" and specifically praised Escargoon, whom he called "one of the best contributions to the Kirby franchise thanks to his dimwitted attitude and obvious stupidity" and suggested should be in the fourth Super Smash Bros. game. However, Common Sense Media described the English dub as "a stab at educational value, but really all about fighting monsters", Christina Carpenter from THEM Anime described the anime as "more pandering kiddy fluff from the Fox Box". Bamboo Dong of Anime News Network cited Kirby: Right Back at Ya! as one of several examples of anime that "exist only to be made fun of" and stated that "the anime really isn't that good at all" and would only be enjoyed by loyal Kirby fans.
