= Seth (Street Fighter) =

Street Fighter character

- Street Fighter character
- Artwork by Tamio illustrating the original Seth from Street Fighter IV and the feminine Seth from Street Fighter V.
- First game: Street Fighter IV (2008)
- Created by: Yoshinori Ono
- Voiced by: EN: Michael McConnohie; JA: Akio Ōtsuka

In-universe information
- Species: Android

Seth (Japanese: セス, Hepburn: Sesu) is a character in Capcom's Street Fighter fighting game series. First introduced in Street Fighter IV, he is the main antagonist and final boss of the game and its subsequent updates. He is the chief executive officer of the Shadaloo Intimidation Network (S.I.N.), the weapons division of the Shadaloo terrorist organization in the game's narrative. His body has been heavily modified using advanced technology, with a device installed in his abdomen called the "Tanden Engine". Other appearances by Seth include Project X Zone and Street Fighter V. Seth is voiced by Akio Ōtsuka in Japanese, and Michael McConnohie in English.

As a boss character in Street Fighter IV, Seth is not particularly popular with video game journalists, and had been criticized for the lack of originality behind his character design as well as unfair difficulty. On the other hand, Seth's return in Street Fighter V along with the character's visual overhaul has been received more positively.

== Creation and conception ==
The character is named after Seth Killian, Capcom's former senior manager. Killian explained in an interview dated April 2009 that it was not his idea to have the character named after himself, though he felt honored as a Street Fighter fan for being part of the series' history. In an interview with Eurogamer to promote the release of Street Fighter IV, series producer Yoshinori Ono explained that Seth is a new character who has connections to other major characters in the game's narrative, in particular recurring series antagonist M. Bison and his Shadaloo organization who were presumed to have met their demise at the end of Street Fighter II. Ono drew attention to his vacant facial expression, strange skin coloration, and the Tanden Engine device embedded in his stomach as visual markers indicating his "unique-looking" visual design and that he is clearly not an ordinary human being.

At the conclusion of the 2019 edition of Capcom Cup, Ono and professional wrestler Kenny Omega appeared on stage to announce the unveiling of Seth as the 40th and newest addition to the Street Fighter V: Champion Edition roster, the full version of which will be released on February 14, 2020. For the character's redesign, the development team began with an "antique/old-fashioned" concept, as the goal was to make the "First" Seth. The team was also exploring the idea of an apprentice character for Gen at the time, and eventually decided to combine that idea with Seth's look in Street Fighter IV. The design direction then began to shift toward the character's finalized appearance in Street Fighter V, with a hair knot replacing the character's bald head, and inspiration for the character's silhouette drew from fierce Buddhist statues like Kongo Rikishi and Nio statues. Seth's physiology is based on the idea of a human-like being found by some organization who would "continue evolving" by absorbing the DNA of other individuals. The developers also explored the idea of Seth's arms and legs transforming in the manner seen in Steampunk-themed movies and books, and fans would be added to the character's back to suggest a cooling down mechanism is in place to prevent overheating issues during battle. Small Tanden Engines are also implemented to work as spherical joints; when the character's epidermis expands, the power flow from the Tanden Engine becomes visible.

== Appearances ==
In Street Fighter IV, Seth is presented as the CEO of the weapons corporation S.I.N., and has altered himself using highly advanced technology, which has changed him on a seemingly structural level and made him much more than human. Having collected data on some of the world's best fighters, Seth borrows moves from a number of different characters to create a fighting style of his own. Seth is intent on completing BLECE (Boiling Liquid Expanding Cell Explosion), which spurs the creation of a new fighting tournament. Seth is a non-playable final boss in the arcade version of Street Fighter IV, but is selectable in the home console version. In the character's ending, Seth is revealed to be "Number 15", one of many androids created by Bison which are intended to be a replacement body for him. Number 15 rebels against his programming, tries to overthrow Bison and pursue his own agenda. Another major character introduced in the game, Abel, is also revealed to be a prototype of Seth's model.

Seth appears in Street Fighter V as a post-launch DLC character for the game's season 4, and is included with the Champion Edition update. It is revealed that Seth has survived the events of IV after transferring his consciousness from his damaged original body into "Doll Unit 0", a feminine body type used in Bison's Doll Program. An updated version of Seth's original design from Street Fighter IV is available as an alternate costume for the character.

Outside of the Street Fighter series, Seth appears as a rival unit in Project X Zone, interacting with Alisa Bosconovitch, Juri, Ryu and Jin Kazama.

=== Gameplay ===
Within the Street Fighter universe, Seth is created using fighting data from the world's best fighters, which enables him to copy techniques used by other characters, such as Guile's Sonic Boom and Zangief's Spinning Piledriver. Ryota Niitsuma, assistant producer of the arcade version of Street Fighter IV, acknowledged that Seth was overpowered and was stronger than Capcom had anticipated following the launch of Street Fighter IV, and later updates for the game would tweak him to be more balanced.

For Street Fighter V, Seth is given a completely new moveset, but maintains his ability to mimic his opponents; Capcom USA employee Dan Louie explained that this is intended to make Seth "feel familiar and fresh at the same time" to players. His playstyle in each match differs not only based on the V-Skill or V-Trigger the player chooses, but will also be different based on their opponent in the case of Seth's V-Skill I. Seth is capable of stealing moves from all 40 characters in the roster of Street Fighter V as of season 4, meaning he can even steal a special move from another Seth. Seth also uses the Tanden Engine for a special move, his super combo, and both of his ultra combos.

== Critical reception ==
Seth received mixed reception since their debut in Street Fighter IV, particularly for his design which many compared to the Watchmen character Dr. Manhattan, but also his gameplay. VideoGamer.com's Wesley Yin-Poole described him as "not only cheap to fight against but a lazy effort on Capcom's part". They added that the combination of Seth's "silly name" and moves taken from existing characters made him a disappointment. Simon Parker from Eurogamer expressed similar sentiments, and disapproved of the character's "near-unblockable and weak Ultra move" in particular. On the other hand, Lucas White of Siliconera considered Seth to be "an awesome boss with impossible powers", and argued that the character was "an excellent measuring stick" for the influx of new players attracted to Street Fighter IV and that his moveset served the game's purpose of "onboarding" well. White welcomed Seth's return to the series in Street Fighter V, and appreciated that their moveset has retained a doppelgänger gameplay archetype.

Gavin Jasper of Den of Geek stated that Seth was easily the lamest of the series' villains, adding that while the character brought some interesting ideas to the table he was inferior to characters such as M. Bison, Gill and Sagat. Pointing out that even though his design was unique, "he's just a cover version of Bison", carrying out a similar plotline through an offshoot of Bison's organization. However, despite his criticism he felt Seth's gameplay was his one saving grace, noting that while many of the attacks were borrowed his use of them was creative, incorporating some together in a powerful presentation. Despite this praise, Jasper further emphasized that Seth never came across as anything more than another villain in the series, and was ultimately usurped by Bison again. Becky Chambers and Amanda LaPergola of The Mary Sue voiced similar sentiments, but further added that they felt he suffered from trying to be too many things at once as a character, a trait they felt he shared with C. Viper who was also introduced in the same game. They further felt that much of his gameplay was designed to be more frustrating than anything, stating that the "second stage of his fight was a royal pain in the ass" and that everyone rightfully hated him.

Seth's redesign as a feminine character in Street Fighter V also generated discussion. Bruno Galvão from the Portuguese edition of Eurogamer and Ozzie Mejia from Shacknews expressed bemusement at Seth's redesign, as the character occupies a feminine body who still speaks with a masculine voice, while Keith Mitchell of The OuterHaven described it as "Rule 34 Seth" and stated they were unsure why Capcom chose this particular route with the character over more requested fighters. Jonathan Toyad of Kakuchopurei stated that while some aspects of Seth combination of traits were "all sorts of Freudian if robots actually have genders", he appreciated it as an interesting approach that he felt brightened up a roster and enabled developers to get creative with character designs, citing a long history of similar characters in fighting games.

Others discussed Seth's redesign in the scope of queer representation and transgender themes in video games. Ariel Litwak in an article for The Michigan Daily felt Seth served as a positive example of such added to gaming by a character redesign, stating that the "androgynous presentation" alongside their altered moveset and general playstyle made the character one of their favorites. Noting that both aspects helped Seth's overall popularity in Street Fighter V, she argued such helped pave the way for two characters in Arc System Works fighting game Guilty Gear Strive, Testament and Bridget, to be similarly redesigned as nonbinary and transgender respectively. Ashley Schofield writing for TheGamer also voiced praise and favoritism towards the redesign, appreciating not only how it helped paint a "considerable change in their self-actualisation", but also in how the masculine voice reflected dysphoria issues transgender people face regarding their voice and 'passing' as their chosen gender.
