= E.Y.E.S. of Mars =

1993 Japanese science fiction animated film

- Directed by: Iku Suzuki
- Screenplay by: Sōji Yoshikawa
- Story by: Ikuko Senaga; Shigekazu Takagi
- Starring: Kotono Mitsuishi; Tsutomu Kashiwakura; Hiromi Tsuru; Michiko Neya; Shizuka Ishikawa; Takkō Ishimori; Rika Nakano; Shinya Ōtaki
- Music by: Naoki Nishimura
- Production company: Toei Animation
- Distributed by: Mother Project
- Release date: 26 December 1993
- Country: Japan
- Language: Japanese

E.Y.E.S. of Mars, originally released in Japan as Mother: Saigo no Shōjo Eve (MOTHER 最後の少女イヴ), is a 1993 Japanese science fiction anime film produced by Toei Animation and directed by Iku Suzuki. Commissioned by the environmentalist M.O.T.H.E.R. Project, it opened in Japanese cinemas on 26 December 1993 and was released on home video in the United States in 1997.

Set on a polluted Mars, the story follows a girl with psychic abilities who discovers that humanity has already destroyed another planet. The film draws on the legend of Atlantis and warns of the consequences of environmental destruction and dependence on technology.

Critics faulted the film's heavy-handed environmental message, thin characterization and narrative inconsistencies, although they differed in their assessments of the animation. Scholars have discussed it alongside Nausicaä of the Valley of the Wind (1984) and Please Save My Earth, examining its environmental themes and its treatment of humanity's relationship with nature.

== Plot ==
In the distant past, humanity inhabits a technologically advanced but severely polluted civilization on Mars. Most of the surviving population lives in a domed city, while a group of girls at the E.Y.E.S. training centre are taught to develop psychic abilities. The centre is surrounded by what appears to be a pristine forest, although the environment has been artificially created underground. The girls' memories have been erased, leaving them unaware of conditions outside the centre. One of the students, Eve, has recurring dreams of her world's destruction.

Dew, a boy involved with a resistance movement opposing the city's authorities, infiltrates the centre and persuades Eve to leave with him. She discovers the devastated environment outside and is reunited with her parents. The resistance hopes that her psychic powers will enable her to awaken a mysterious entity known as the Messenger.

The Messenger reveals humanity's forgotten history. Humans originally inhabited Atlas, a fifth planet in the Solar System, but destroyed its environment through warfare and technological development. The survivors migrated to Mars, where their civilization repeated the same mistakes. The Messenger urges humanity to restore its relationship with nature instead of seeking refuge on another planet. The city's mayor accepts this advice, but the security chief DeCardin attempts to evacuate part of the population aboard a spacecraft intended to reach Earth.

The launch ends in disaster, destroying the city as Eve had foreseen. Eve and other inhabitants nevertheless survive as disembodied spirits and migrate to Earth, where the film connects their arrival with the beginnings of human civilization and the subsequent development of Atlantis.

== Production and release ==
The film was produced by Toei Dōga (later renamed Toei Animation) and directed by Iku Suzuki. Sōji Yoshikawa wrote the screenplay, based on an original story by Ikuko Senaga and Shigekazu Takagi. Shūichi Seki designed the characters, Jirō Kōno was responsible for the art, and Naoki Nishimura composed the music. Shigeaki Saegusa was credited with the theme music.

The film was commissioned by the M.O.T.H.E.R. Project, an environmentalist organization. Animation historian Fred Patten thought its visual style appeared closer to American animation than conventional Japanese anime, although he could not determine whether it had been intended for an American audience.

The film was released theatrically in Japan on 26 December 1993, with Mother Project as its distributor. Celebrity Home Entertainment released it in the United States on VHS on 9 September 1997 under the title E.Y.E.S. of Mars. It was also broadcast on the Sci-Fi Channel around that time. In his 2016 filmography of Mars-related films, Thomas Kent Miller listed the film's running time as 80 minutes and its aspect ratio as 1.37:1; however The Encyclopedia of Science Fiction gives the film running time as 70 minutes.

== Voice cast ==
The principal Japanese voice cast was:

- Kotono Mitsuishi as Eve (イヴ)
- Hiromi Tsuru as Sarah (サラ)
- Tsutomu Kashiwakura as Dew (デュー)
- Michiko Neya as Meiza Dōsun (メイザドースン)
- Shizuka Ishikawa as Nellie Shinji (ネリー・シンジ)

== Themes and analysis ==
Julie Ha Tran compared E.Y.E.S. of Mars with Hayao Miyazaki's Nausicaä of the Valley of the Wind (1984). She regarded both as warnings about the ecological damage caused by industrialization and warfare, but also examined how they portray nature as a nonhuman "Other". In her reading, the films question the distinction between humanity and the natural world, a recurring concern in Japanese science fiction.

Tran drew a contrast between the films' use of flight. In Nausicaä, flying allows the characters to explore, communicate and imagine alternatives to their present circumstances. In E.Y.E.S. of Mars, the attempted evacuation by spacecraft instead represents humanity's desire to escape the consequences of environmental destruction. The spacecraft and the Martian city are destroyed, leaving the question of whether technological progress and space colonization can solve ecological problems or simply postpone them.

Tran also examined the treatment of the psychically gifted girls at the E.Y.E.S. centre. Although they possess extraordinary abilities, their memories have been erased and they are kept apart from the devastated world outside their artificial forest. Their powers make them useful to the military, which treats them as instruments rather than individuals. Tran contrasted their exploitation with the conduct of the military leadership, whose willingness to sacrifice others in order to escape Mars calls into question which characters can be considered truly humane.

She further interpreted the names Eve and Dew as references to nature, linking Eve to the biblical Garden of Eden and Dew to water. Eve's empathy and concern for the environment, despite her supposedly abnormal powers, challenge the distinction between ordinary humans and those considered different. For Tran, the film presents humanity in terms of its relationships with nature and other beings, rather than biological identity alone. She saw a similar treatment of the boundaries between human and nonhuman existence in Nausicaä.

Anime scholar Patrick Drazen discussed E.Y.E.S. of Mars alongside Please Save My Earth as an example of environmentalist anime. He noted that its humans have already destroyed their original planet before repeating the process on Mars, ultimately sending their souls to Earth.

== Reception ==
Steven Pearce, writing for The Encyclopedia of Science Fiction, and Carlos/Giancarla Ross of THEM Anime Reviews both criticized the film's environmental message, finding it heavy-handed. Pearce found its treatment of science largely hostile and relying on clichés, with technology portrayed as harmful and nature as uniformly benevolent. Ross similarly objected to the film's simplistic division between good nature and bad technology, describing its environmentalism as excessively moralistic. Thomas Kent Miller similarly characterized the film as "preachy", describing it briefly as "a cautionary tale of the dangers of being careless about ecology".

Pearce and Ross were also critical of the characters and plot. Pearce argued that the short running time left too little room to develop the characters and numerous plot elements, resulting in one-dimensional or inconsistent characterization. Ross found the characters similarly shallow and considered the ending an unconvincing deus ex machina. Ross also questioned the film's scientific plausibility, particularly the conditions on Atlas and Mars, the inhabitants' technological capabilities, and the use of the Atlantis myth. The reviewer noted that Eve ultimately fails to save Mars, with humanity instead moving on to Earth.

Patten, writing for Cartoon Research, likewise raised questions about the plot and its environmental message. He wondered how the underground forest could survive without extensive technological support despite the film's rejection of technology. He also pointed to an apparent continuity problem involving Eve's parents appearing in spacesuits above Mars, and noted that the meaning of the acronym E.Y.E.S. is never explained.

The reviewers differed somewhat in their assessments of the animation. Pearce considered its quality reasonably good, despite his reservations about the film's narrative. Ross was less impressed, arguing that the animation was poor for a production released in 1993 and deteriorated toward the conclusion; also criticizing the English-language dub, finding the voice performances indifferent and lacking emotion.
