= List of Tsukihime, Lunar Legend episodes =

The cover of the first DVD compilation released by Geneon Entertainment in North America.

Tsukihime, Lunar Legend (真月譚 月姫, Shingetsutan Tsukihime) is an anime television series. The episodes are directed by Katsushi Sakurabi, animated by J.C.Staff, and produced by the Tsukihime Production Committee, which included Geneon Entertainment, Movic, Tokyo Broadcasting System, and J.C.Staff. The English adaptation of the episodes has been licensed by Geneon Entertainment. The episodes are based on the visual novel Tsukihime by Type-Moon and adapt the source material with twelve episodes. The series follows a high school boy and a female vampire on a quest to kill a male vampire.

The episodes aired in Japan from October 10 to December 26, 2003, on BS-i. The episodes received their international premiere on the anime television network Animax, who have also later aired the series across its respective networks worldwide in Southeast Asia and South Asia, and its other networks in East Asia, South America and other regions under the title Lunar Legend Tsukihime.

Two pieces of theme music are used for the episodes; one opening theme and one ending theme. The opening theme is "The Sacred Moon" by Toshiyuki Omori, and the ending theme is "Rinne no Hate ni" (輪廻の果てに) by Fumiko Orikasa.

Six DVD compilations, each containing two episodes, have been released by Geneon Entertainment in Japan. The first was released on December 10, 2003, and the sixth on May 13, 2004. Geneon Entertainment has released three DVD compilations, each containing four episodes, in North America, with the third released on February 22, 2005.

== Episode list ==
No.	Title	Original release date
1	"Inverted Impulses"; Transliteration: "Hanten Shōdō" (Japanese: 反転衝動)	October 10, 2003
At a young age, Shiki Tohno saw the lines and can destroy anyone or anything. He received a pair of glasses blocking the lines from his sight by a mysterious sorceress, and he continued to live a normal life. Years later, he moves back into the house of his sister, Akiha, after the death of their father. After talking about the strange serial killings in the city with his friends at school, he sees a woman on his way home, and after falling into a dreamlike sequence, kills her. He awakens at the house, but on his way to school the next day, he sees the woman again.
2	"Black Beast"; Transliteration: "Kuroi Kemono" (Japanese: 黒い獣)	October 17, 2003
Shiki flees from the woman, until they reach the alley. As she approaches him, they are ambushed by a pair of demonic hounds, whom the woman kills. She identifies herself as Arcueid Brunestud, a vampire who is hunting another one in the city. The same hounds begin to attack the hotel they visit, and Arcueid, weakened due to needing to regenerate after Shiki killed her, meets the vampire Nrvnqsr Chaos. After Shiki and Arcueid leave the hotel, they plan to work together.
3	"Mystic Eyes of Death Perception"; Transliteration: "Chokushi no Magan" (Japanese: 直死の魔眼)	October 24, 2003
Shiki awakens in the apartment, and Arcueid explains the difference between the True Ancestors and the Dead Apostles, and how her mission was to slay the latter. Arcueid implores into the nature of Shiki's power, which she identifies as the Mystic Eyes of Death Perception, enabling him to see the fated destruction of an object, and erase it from existence. As a result, she employs a trap using herself as bait for Nrvnqsr and Shiki hides in a tree. As Nrvnqsr arrives, Shiki attacks him, but is quickly repelled. However, Nrvnqsr's overconfidence allows Shiki to bypass his guard and kill him. As Shiki collapses, Arcueid congratulates him.
4	"Garden of a Cradle"; Transliteration: "Yurikago no Niwa" (Japanese: 揺籠の庭)	October 31, 2003
Shiki awakens in the Tohno household, and is scolded over breakfast by Akiha for being late the previous night. At school, Shiki is relieved to see that Satsuki Yumizuka, who he had previously believed to be in the hotel when Nrvnqsr attacked, is safe. Shiki is given a party by Akiha, who formally welcomes her brother into the Tohno household. Shiki talks to Kohaku, one of the maids, and learns that Akiha, despite her stoic demeanor, is pleased by Tohno's presence. That evening, Shiki has a dreamlike sequence where Arcueid comes, craving for his blood. The next day at school, Arcueid arrives and finds Shiki.
5	"A Bow of the Sky"; Transliteration: "Sora no Yumi" (Japanese: 空の弓)	November 7, 2003
Arcueid convinces Shiki to continue hunting vampires. They agree on a meeting time, and Shiki leaves home with the aid of Hisui, the other maid. After meeting Arcueid, she explains that she is hunting a vampire named Roa, who reincarnates by transferring his soul from one host body to another when he dies. Shiki and Arcueid are confronted by a pair of zombies led by Roa, and Arcueid dispatches them. The next day, Ciel tells Shiki to be wary of Arcueid. Arcueid treats Shiki to dinner, but quickly leaves after seeing his blood.
6	"White Dream"; Transliteration: "Shiroi Yume" (Japanese: 白い夢)	November 14, 2003
Shiki overhears at school that three students went missing the previous night while they were in the city. As he returns home, he spends time with Akiha and allows him to have a television, although she dislikes noisy objects. Shiki leaves home to accompany Arcueid, who reveals she had been working to get money. They notice the three supposedly missing students, whom Arcueid identifies as being under Roa's control. Arcueid dispatches the two, and Shiki defeats the third one. Afterwards, Shiki takes Arcueid through the city, and promises to go on a date together.
7	"Blue Sin Mark"; Transliteration: "Aoi Toga Ato" (Japanese: 蒼い咎跡)	November 21, 2003
Shiki and Akiha invite their friends to an amusement park, where they later accompany Arcueid. The group enjoys the rides, although Shiki becomes exhausted. As the group squabbles over where to go next, Yumizuka breaks the animosity between Ahika, Arcueid and Ciel, and the group ends up going to an onsen. Once there, Yumizuka divulges her envy about Arcueid, but Arcueid replies that she cannot have a significant relationship with Shiki because she is not human. Akiha leaves the amusement park in disgust, after talking to Ciel.
8	"Origami"; Transliteration: "Origami" (Japanese: 檻髪)	November 28, 2003
After returning home, Shiki discovers Akiha collapsing shortly. Kohaku claims she will be fine, and Shiki stays with her through the night. The next day, he is strangely asked by Ciel to allow things to stay normal longer. At home, he sees Akiha taking blood from Kohaku. Arcueid later reveals that Roa reincarnates in the bodies of families with inhuman characteristics, and Shiki learns that Akiha is Roa. That evening, Shiki discovers Akiha, whose hair magically turn red. Shiki accompanies Arcueid, but after leaving her, he is attacked by Roa, a man seeing the same lines like him, and Shiki is cut across the chest. As Roa flees, Shiki collapses with the wound.
9	"Death"; Transliteration: "Shi" (Japanese: 死)	December 5, 2003
Shiki is sent home and watched by Akiha through the night. The next day, Kohaku reveals that the Tohno family carries inhuman characteristics, and the one with those characteristics designated the head of the family. With Akiha absent, Hisui allows Shiki into Akiha's study, where he finds a key. Trying doors throughout the house, he opens one leading to a dungeon cell with "Help Me" written in blood on the wall. Shiki recalls how there was another boy in his childhood resembling him and how he had killed him. Akiha, furious at him discovering this knowledge, reprimands the maids.
10	"Crimson Red Moon"; Transliteration: "Ake no Kōgetsu" (Japanese: 朱の紅月)	December 12, 2003
As Shiki rests, Arcueid asks him to go on a date. After visiting several locales, Aruceid asks Shiki to visit the school. There, Arcueid expresses her fear that should she go to sleep again, she will awaken and Shiki will be gone. Shiki makes a promise with her that after the events ended, he will go on another date with her. Afterwards, they visit the tea room, and Shiki inquires about Ciel. Arcueid reveals that Ciel was Roa's host. The two are ambushed by Roa's minions, but after Arcueid dispatches them, Shiki collapses. The sight of his blood awakens Arcueid's vampire nature, and she is separated from Shiki by a sword sent by Ciel.
11	"Misfortunate Night"; Transliteration: "Magatsu Yoru" (Japanese: 凶つ夜)	December 19, 2003
Arcueid flees, and Ciel explains that Arcueid was the White Princess of the True Ancestors, until Roa offered her a rose with blood for her to undergo a cycle, where she would awaken for brief periods to kill Roa and go to sleep once more. Shiki discovers Akiha confronting Roa. Ciel arrives and rescues the siblings, forcing Roa to retreat. At home, Shiki finds that he was adopted, and that he swapped places with the real one after he went berserk. Shiki makes love with Arcueid at the apartment. When he awakens, he finds a note that Arcueid left.
12	"Lunar World"; Transliteration: "Gessekai" (Japanese: 月世界)	December 26, 2003
Shiki accompanies Ciel and they finalize the plan. Shiki is horrified by seeing Roa kill Arcueid at the school. He then challenges him to avenge Arcueid. Although initially outmatched, Shiki destroys the entire walkway and kills Roa, distracted by Ciel. She disappears, with no person in the school besides Shiki having any memory of her. Shiki goes to the same tree he visited as a child and thanks the same sorceress he saw, Aoko Aozaki. While waiting for Arcueid at school, Shiki sees her, and she thanks him for fulfilling his promise before disappearing.
