= Fight Da!! Pyūta =

Japanese anime television series

Fight Da!! Pyūta (Japanese: ファイトだ!!ピュー太, lit: It's a fight!! Pyūta) is a Japanese monochrome anime series created by Murotani Tsunezo that was broadcast on NET (now: TV Asahi) from April 6, 1968 to September 28, 1968. It was a joint production of Mainichi Broadcasting System and Broadcast Animation Production. It was sponsored solely by Megmilk Snow Brand. It consisted of 26 episodes. The broadcast time was every Saturday from 19:30 to 20:00 (Japan Standard Time). It was a black and white series. It was later rebroadcast on various Japanese local televisions until the early 1970s.

== Synopsis ==
Pyūta Konno, the son of a genuis grandfather, develops genius gadgets for his grandfather Dr Tsururi in each episode. Each episode, he goes head-to-head with rival inventor Walther VII and his assistant, Brake.

== Characters ==
Pyūta Konno (今野ピュー太)

Voice: Makiko Ito

The protagonist. A boy who loves inventing, is proactive, and has a strong sense of justice. He aspires to become a great inventor like his grandfather.

Dr. Tsururi (ツルリ博士)

Voice: Keiroku Seki

Pyuta's genius grandfather. He runs a research institute called "Tsururi Research Institute" on the roof of a building. He is self-conscious about his thinning hair, and aside from using it as his only research subject, he spends his days napping on the sofa.

He was once a supergenius scientist who was said to be "a sure bet for the Nobel Peace Prize" in 1921, however he lost that prize to Albert Einstein, and he was so shocked that he fell down the stairs and became blurry.

*Walther Gang

Walther VII (ワルサー7世)

Voice: Kyoji Kobayashi

A wicked genius scientist from a prestigious family. Following the Walther family tradition, he targets Dr. Tsururi and his team's inventions and plots to misuse them. He is very cunning but also foolish. He has a fear of mice.

Brake (ブレーキ)

Voice: Sagami Takeshi

Walther VII's number one sidekick, however, he is even more clumsier than Walther himself.
