= List of Outlaw Star chapters =

Outlaw Star (星方武侠アウトロースター, Seihō Bukyō Autorō Sutā; lit. 'Starward Warrior Knight Outlaw Star') is a seinen manga series written and illustrated by Takehiko Itō and his affiliated Morning Star Studio. The series is a science fiction Space Western that takes place in the "Toward Stars Era" universe in which spacecraft are capable of traveling faster than the speed of light. The plot follows protagonist Gene Starwind and his motley crew of an inherited ship dubbed the "Outlaw Star", as they search for a legendary, outer space treasure trove called the "Galactic Leyline".

The manga was serialized in the monthly Japanese Shueisha magazine Ultra Jump between 1996 and 1999. A total of 21 chapters were published, and 17 of these chapters were compiled among three tankōbon (collected volumes), released between August 1997 and January 1999. Each volume also contains information on the series' universe; detailed spaceship and planet descriptions; and character profiles. A Chinese version of the manga was published in Hong Kong by Sharp Point Press. The series has also been published in German and Italian by Planet Manga. No official English translation of the Outlaw Star exists, though Morning Star Studio's official website suggests that a release in the United States was planned at one time.

== Volume list ==
No.	Title	Release date	ISBN
1	1st Star: Fire & Ice	August 1997	4-08-875555-3
Chapters; 1. "Fire & Ice"; 2. "Night of Sentinel"; 3. "Kaizoku"; 4. "Caster"; Toward Stars Era: Outlaw Star Press Vol. 1
2	2nd Star: Grappler Ship	May 1998	4-08-875644-4
Chapters; 5. "Treasure of Pirate"; 6. "Grappler Ship"; 7. "Zero-Range Attack"; 8. "The Promise"; 9. "Let's Do It"; 10. "Cross Road Blues"; Toward Stars Era: Outlaw Star Press Vol. 2
3	3rd Star: Loud Minority	January 1999	4-08-875754-8
Chapters; 11. "Honky Tonk Women"; 12. "My Soul"; 13. "Open Your Eyes"; 14. "Last Train Form"; 15. "Like Someone in Love"; 16. "Spiritual"; 17. "Loud Minority"; Toward Stars Era: Outlaw Star Press Vol. 3

== Not released in tankōbon format ==
- 18. "Intermission"
- 19. "Intermission II"
- 20. "Sacred Ground"
- 21. "Chaser"
