= 108 Stars =

108 Stars may refer to:

- 108 Stars of Destiny, featured in the Chinese classic Shui Hu Zhuan
- 108 Stars of Destiny (Suikoden)
- A group of Tao magic user characters in Outlaw Star
