= Angel Links =

Japanese anime television series

- Region 1 DVD cover

星方天使エンジェルリンクス (Seihō Tenshi Enjeru Rinkusu)
- Genre: Action, Adventure, Comedy, Science fiction
- Created by: Hajime Yatate; Takehiko Itō
- Manga
- Written by: Takehiko Itō
- Illustrated by: Rikako Enomoto
- Published by: Kadokawa Shoten
- Magazine: Dragon Jr.
- Published: January 12, 1999
- Volumes: 1
- Light novel

Hoshi Hou Yuugeki Tai Angel Links
- Written by: Ibuki Hideaki
- Published by: Fujimi Shobo
- Imprint: Dragon Magazine
- Published: April 1998 – August 1999
- Volumes: 4
- Anime television series

Seihō Tenshi Angel Links
- Directed by: Yūji Yamaguchi
- Produced by: Atsushi Sugita; Naotake Furusato
- Written by: Masaharu Amiya
- Music by: Toshihiko Sahashi
- Studio: Sunrise
- Licensed by: Crunchyroll
- Original network: Wowow
- Original run: April 7, 1999 – June 30, 1999
- Episodes: 13
- Related works
- Outlaw Star

Angel Links (星方天使エンジェルリンクス, Seihō Tenshi Enjeru Rinkusu; lit. "Angels of the Stars: Angel Links") is a Japanese anime television series produced by Sunrise. It was originally aired across the Japanese Wowow television network from April 7 to June 30, 1999. It is a spin-off of the manga Outlaw Star by Takehiko Itō.

A series of light novels titled Hoshi Hou Yuugeki Tai Angel Links (星方遊撃隊エンジェルリンクス), written and illustrated by Ibuki Hideaki, began publication prior to the anime series. A short one-volume manga adaptation loosely retells the story.

The anime was released in the U.S. by Bandai.

== Origins ==
It is a spin-off of the manga Outlaw Star by Takehiko Itō. The characters Duuz and Valeria debuted in an episode of Outlaw Star titled "Law and Lawlessness", and in Angel Links work for Meifon.

== Premise ==
The story follows the 16-year-old protagonist, Meifon Li, who becomes the head of a corporation dedicated to saving transportation companies in outer space from pirates for free, as per her grandfather's dying wish. As the series progresses, she learns a terrifying secret about her grandfather and the reason for his wish.

== Characters ==
Meifon Li (李 美鳳, Ri Meifon; Hanyu Pinyin: Lǐ Měifèng)
The protagonist and leader of the pirate-fighting service known as Angel Links. She is an excited and romantic teenager who takes her job seriously, but shows a relaxed side when she's not on duty. Meifon's most noteworthy trait is her large bust, and is often the subject of fanservice because of it. Her partner in battle is Taffei, who hides in her cleavage until Meifon calls for his help (Taffei transforms into a unique blade that has the visual qualities of angelic and demonic).Meifon excels at both martial arts and swordsmanship. She has a hotblooded side, and like Duuz she enjoys a good fight. Meifon is plagued with a strange past that unveils itself as the anime moves forward.

Meifon is voiced by Ryoka Yuzuki in Japanese and Mariette Sluyter in English.

Kosei Hida (飛田 鴻星, Hida Kōsei)
Meifon's left-hand man and the one in charge of various departments such as the payroll for the company. On ship, he usually takes a passive role as Meifon's advisor. He also prepares tea occasionally during a relatively minor battle. Kosei originally served Meifon's grandfather Chenho Li, which explains his willingness to always assist Meifon. Generally a well-mannered young man who is popular with women because of his attractive appearance, Kosei strives to do everything in a just and timely method. When it comes to battle, Kosei does not show much participation, but has some skill with a number of firearms.

Kosei is voiced by Hikaru Midorikawa in Japanese and Tommy Campbell in English.
Valeria Vertone (ヴァレリア・ベルトーネ, Vareria Berutōne)

Originally appeared in Outlaw Star as a member of a pirate-fighting group called Angel Links, Valeria Vertone is the ship's tactician. Most of the time, when the enemies are nothing too serious for the crew, Valeria is calmly relaxing in her seat, painting or filing her fingernails. She used to be a tactician for the Einhorn Empire and was their top strategist despite being so young at the time, but was put on trial for disobeying orders and getting most of her fleet killed during one mission. She also had a lover named Lawrence during her time in Einhorn, but had to drop the relationship when she was exiled. When Meifon is not present on the ship, Valeria assumes role as commander.
Valeria wields a tonfa as well as kickboxing (in which she also trains when she is off duty). In contrast to her Outlaw Star appearance, the major differences are her hair (which is far more wild-looking, including a more defined red streak which can only be seen in her final scene in "Law and Lawlessness" and on the opposite side) and her personality (which is more relaxed in comparison to being so "by-the-book" in Outlaw Star). She is also the only character among the crew who could be considered Duuz's friend, out of respect for one another's battle talents and perhaps because they are closer in age than the other crew members, who are teenagers to young adults.

Valeria is voiced by Atsuko Tanaka in Japanese and Elizabeth Stepkowski in English.
Duuz Delax Rex (ドゥーズ・デラクス・レクス, Dūzu Derakuzu Rekusu)

Originally appeared in Outlaw Star as a stubborn, hotheaded officer of a pirate-fighting group called Angel Links. He is much more relaxed than his Outlaw Star incarnation and tends to view humans as very inferior to his people. Duuz is the ship's Platoon Commander.
Known for being the most powerful among his people (called Dragonites in Angel Links rather than Saurians), he is unmatched in swordsmanship and barehanded combat. Highly powerful and deadly, Duuz fights battles alone (though he is assisted by Meifon, Kosei and Valeria occasionally) and never seems to suffer any kind of damage. He is so skilled that he can deflect bullets with his sword. Incidentally, like Valeria, he is often the most calm member of the entire crew, silently polishing his cherished sword on the ship or doing crossword puzzles. He is also wise and contemplative, and is able to read the enemies' moves with little trouble as well as give advice like a "wise dragon" would. Duuz is a vegetarian, and does not like seafood.

Duuz is voiced by Kenji Utsumi in Japanese and Dave Kelly in English.

== Media ==
=== Publications ===
Angel Links was first drafted as a light novel series titled Hoshi Hou Yuugeki Tai Angel Links, penned by Ibuki Hideaki and published under the Fujimi Shobo Dragon Magazine label. A total of four novels were produced and published between April 1998 and August 1999.

A single-volume manga based on the Angel Links anime series was published by Kadokawa Shoten on January 12, 1999. An art book titled Seihō Tenshi Enjeru Rinkusu: All About Meifon (星方天使エンジェルリンクス -ALL ABOUT MEIFON-) was published by Gakken in Japan on July 27, 1999. Another artbook covering illustrations by character designer Asako Nishida features the artist's contributions to the Outlaw Star and Angel Links series.

=== Anime ===
The 13 episodes that comprise the Angel Links anime series originally aired on Japan's Wowow television network from April 7 to June 30, 1999. Bandai Visual released the series on DVD in Japan in seven separate volumes from August 25, 1999, to March 25, 2000. A DVD box set containing the entire series was published on July 28, 2006. Yet another box set titled "Emotion the Best: Seihō Tenshi Angel Links" was released in Japan on September 24, 2010. The anime was later licensed for English language distribution in North America by Bandai Entertainment. It was initially released in this region on DVD in four separate volumes and was later compiled into a "Complete Collection" box set on July 1, 2003. Finally, the series was re-released in a box set as part of Bandai's "Anime Legends" label on April 25, 2006. Following the closure of Bandai Entertainment in 2012, Sunrise announced at their panel at Otakon 2013, that Funimation has picked up Angel Links, along with a handful of other former Bandai Entertainment titles.

=== CDs ===
The musical score of Angel Links was composed by Toshihiko Sahashi. The series features one opening theme, "All My Soul" by Naw Naw, and one closing theme, "True Moon" by Riwako Miyawara. The official soundtrack for the series totalling 62 songs was released in Japan on two albums from May 21, 1999, to July 21, 1999. CD singles for the opening and closing themes have also been released by Bandai.

== Reception ==
The anime was reviewed for THEM Anime Reviews, where the reviewer awarded it 4 stars out of 5, commending the show's "fast paced action, bouncy anime heroines, and smooth colorful animation". The first episodes (DVD vol.1) also received a 91% rating from the reviewer at the AnimeFringe magazine.

The show was also reviewed for Anime News Network. The reviewer was not impressed, concluding that "It's a very average sci-fi adventure show, and everything here has been done better elsewhere".

The anime entry in The Encyclopedia of Science Fiction notes it received a mixed reception. Meifon's portrayal as a young CEO turned altruistic space adventurer, and her arc in the show's bittersweet ending, were reasonably well received, though her visual presentation undercut the attempt at empowerment. Critics noted the show's heavy reliance on fan service: Meifon's overtly sexualized design and the frequent space battles led some to deride it as an example of "big ships and big breasts" aesthetics, an evident bid for adolescent attention. Sunrise's animation and the action sequences were generally praised. The entry concludes that despite occasional ideas hinted at unrealized potential – from the very concept of a charity hunting pirates to notions like living ships – Angel Links remains a decorative, lightweight footnote in late-1990s space opera: visually competent, conceptually thin, and overshadowed by other similar shows of its time.
