= Minowa =

Minowa may refer to:

== People ==
- Minowa (surname)

== Places ==
- Minowa, Nagano (箕輪町, Minowa-machi), town in Kamiina District, Nagano Prefecture, Japan
- Minowa Dam (箕輪ダム), dam in Nagano Prefecture
- Minowa Castle (箕輪城, Minowa-jō), castle in Takasaki, Gunma Prefecture, Japan
- Minowa Station (三ノ輪駅, Minowa-eki), train station in Taitō, Tokyo, Japan

== Other uses ==
- 7068 Minowa, main-belt asteroid
