= THEM Anime Reviews =

Anime news website

- Website type: News and database
- Available in: English
- Headquarters: United States
- Creator: Arizona State University students
- Website: www.themanime.org
- Commercial: No
- Registration: Required for use of forums or contributing information
- Launched: September 9, 1996; 30 years ago
- Current status: Active

THEM Anime Reviews, otherwise known as THEM or T.H.E.M. Anime Reviews, is an anime review website that writes about current and past anime in any form, including OVAs and ONAs. The website offers reviews, editorial content and hosts forums.

== History ==
THEM was founded in 1993 by Arizona State University Honors College students as a school club for fans of science fiction and fantasy. It became an anime review website, named THEM Online, in 1996, and Carlos Ross, who later became one of the editors in chief of the website, became a writer in 1999. By 2007, Ross would be part of Arizona State University's College of Liberal Arts & Science. In June 2000, the current domain name of the website was registered. At the time, the site was using ASU servers, which were later changed.

In the first six years of the site, from 1996 to 2002, only one guest review was accepted and all "submissions from non-THEM members" were not accepted. At the time, Ross's wife, Christine (also known as Christi), was the web designer and assistant reviewing editor, joined by fellow reviewers Raphael See, Jason Bustard, Eric Gaede, and many others. In October 1999, THEM hosted awards for anime they found specifically notable or enjoyed, working with Anime Cafe. See was instrumental in getting the awards to happen. Bustard worked for Anime Club Reviews, and Gaede, the son of Bill Gaede, became famous on YouTube as Asalieri, with the site later cutting off contact with him due to the devotion by him, and his father in "disseminating crackpot pseudoscience".

In June 2002, the ASU-hosted site was last used, with a transition over to a new site for reviews, which is still used to this day. In the following year, those who were not part of THEM began contributing content while Pete Harcoff worked on the web design, which allowed the site to continue. That year THEM presented a "team game show for fans of Japanese animation", hosted by Angel Hungerford, Carlos Ross, and Christina Ross at LepreCon29 in 2003 in Tempe, Arizona. The same year, in September, the new, and current look, of THEM's website premiered. As late as 2004, THEM still defined itself as "a science-fiction/fantasy society" based at ASU.

In January 2005, Janet Crocker, the content editor for Animefringe, described the website as a "great low-frills and old anime review site". She also noted that the website has various types of reviews, has a separate section for adult content, and called it a frequent stop for her to "get honest and to-the-point opinions".

In March 2005, the website was profiled by the Phoenix New Times. Ross, and his wife, Christina, were described as "anime fanatics", who ran the website, preparing for an anime convention known as AniZona 01. Ross and Christina described their love for anime, and what it meant to them.

In March 2006, Ross was interviewed on G4's Attack of the Show!, talking about Diamond Daydreams, Samurai Gun and Azumanga Daioh. In October of the same year, Ross retired from being editor-in-chief of the site, with the duty taken up by Stig Høgset.

In November 2009, Bradley C. Meek, a writer for the website and for anime3000.com, showed up on ANNCast, a podcast hosted by Zac Bertschy and Justin Sevakis of Anime News Network, to discuss anime he had been watching. One month later, Scott Green's Ain't It Cool News recommended the THEM, calling its reviews "worth checking out". In January 2010, Meek, a writer for THEM, was a guest writer on the blog of freelance writer Tim Maughan.

As of 2020, the website has over 1500 full-length reviews, and currently has staff of reviewers from across the globe.

== Features ==
THEM Anime Reviews regularly posts anime reviews, has a list of editorials, and forums. The website has, since 2005, had a section specifically about adult anime. Currently, Enoch Lau, Melissa Sternenberg, Robert Nelson, Stig Høgset, and Tim Jones, are some of the reviewers on the site. Sternenberg is also a professional voice actress who has voiced characters in various visual novels and animations. One of the active reviewers of the website is Nicole MacLean, a musician and geoscience educator, while Robert Lu is the site's convention reporter, along with being reviewer and editor of an anime review site, Animesou. Additionally, Jason Huff, one of the website contributors, runs his own site, called The Anime Review.
