= Uchuu Eiyuu Monogatari =

Japanese science fiction comic book series

宇宙英雄物語 (Uchuu Eiyuu Monogatari)
- Genre: Space opera, Science fiction
- Manga
- Written by: Takehiko Itō
- Published by: Kadokawa Shoten; Shueisha
- Magazine: Comic Comp; Ultra Jump
- Published: 1988–1992; 1995–1996
- Volumes: 8

Uchuu Eiyuu Monogatari (宇宙英雄物語; lit. 'Space Hero Story'), with English: Future Retro Hero Story on the Japanese book cover, or called Space Hero Tales by some English sources, is a Japanese manga series by Takehiko Itō. It was Ito's first serialized manga work, and second published work after his one-shot manga Good Morning Althea. Many of its themes and concepts would be reused by Ito in his later work Outlaw Star, which takes place in the "Towards Star Era" universe, a continuity began in and shared by Uchuu Eiyuu Monogatari.

== Plot ==
Uchuu Eiyuu Monogatari follows the story of a young man named Juji Thomas Godoh, the grandson of the legendary Captain Roger Fortune, who dreams of becoming a hero and traveling into space. A transfer student from America, Juji attends the Fixed Star Academy where he meets a religious young woman named Sakumi Shiihara and contemptuous teacher named Kohryu. When a villain named Star King Brass attacks the school, Juji inadvertently becomes the successor of his grandfather's legacy as a hero through a series of deceptive ploys.

== Background ==
Uchuu Eiyuu Monogatari was initially serialized in Kadokawa Shoten's Comic Comp from 1988 to 1992, but was prematurely canceled when the magazine discontinued publication. It was later resumed in 1995 when Shueisha picked it up for publication in Ultra Jump, allowing it to resume and complete its run in 1996.

The series has never been licensed for publication in English and remains obscure, despite its connection to Outlaw Star, which would come to far outstrip it in popularity.
