= Zegapain =

Japanese anime television series

- ゼーガペイン
- Genre: Mecha, romance, action, Sci-Fi
- Created by: Hajime Yatate; Takehiko Itō
- Developed by: Mayori Sekijima
- Directed by: Masami Shimoda
- Voices of: Shintarō Asanuma; Kana Hanazawa; Ayako Kawasumi; Romi Park
- Music by: Ayako Ōtsuka
- Country of origin: Japan
- Original language: Japanese
- No. of episodes: 26 (list of episodes)

Production
- Producers: Yoshikazu Beniya; Norio Yamakawa; Fumikuni Furusawa; Shintarō Kogake
- Production companies: TV Tokyo; Dentsu; Sunrise

Original release
- Network: TXN (TV Tokyo)
- Release: April 6 – September 28, 2006

Related
- Video game

Zegapain XOR
- Developer: Cavia
- Publisher: Namco Bandai Games
- Genre: Action
- Platform: Xbox 360
- Released: JP: July 27, 2006
- Video game

Zegapain NOT
- Developer: Cavia
- Publisher: Namco Bandai Games
- Genre: Action
- Platform: Xbox 360
- Released: JP: December 6, 2006
- Anime film

Zegapain Adaptation
- Directed by: Masami Shimoda
- Written by: Masami Shimoda
- Music by: Ayako Otsuka
- Studio: Sunrise
- Licensed by: NA: Discotek Media
- Released: October 15, 2016
- Runtime: 117 minutes
- Anime film

Zegapain STA
- Directed by: Masami Shimoda
- Written by: Katsuhiko Takayama
- Music by: Ayako Ōtsuka
- Studio: Sunrise
- Licensed by: NA: Discotek Media
- Released: August 16, 2024
- Runtime: 90 minutes

Zegapain (ゼーガペイン, Zēgapein) is a Japanese anime television series created by Takehiko Itō. Produced by Sunrise, it is directed by Masami Shimoda, with Mayori Sekijima handling series scripts, Akihiko Yamashita designing the characters and Ayako Ōtsuka composing the music. The series premiered in Japan on April 6, 2006, on TV Tokyo and later BS Japan and AT-X. As part of the 10th anniversary of the series, a compilation theatrical film with new scenes, titled Zegapain Adaptation (ゼーガペインADP), was released in Japanese theaters by Shochiku on October 15, 2016. A sequel film, titled Zegapain STA, was released by Sunrise's parent company, Bandai Namco Filmworks, on August 16, 2024.

On October 2, 2007, Bandai Entertainment released the first Region 1 volume of Zegapain with the last volume released on August 5, 2008. Following the 2012 closure of Bandai Entertainment, Sunrise announced at Otakon 2013, that Sentai Filmworks has rescued Zegapain, along with a handful of other former BEI titles. However, it was never released. In August 2025, it was announced Discotek Media had rescued the anime and will be releasing it on Blu-ray alongside the films.

== Plot ==
Kyo Sogoru, a high school boy living in a city called Maihama, leads a normal life of school, romance, and the swim club. Kyo's life changes when he sees a beautiful girl, Shizuno Misaki, at the pool one day and discovers he is initially the only person who can see her. In order to keep his high school's swimming club open by recruiting more members, Kyo hopes to enlist Shizuno to appear in a promo video shot by Kyo's close friend, Ryoko. Shizuno agrees, but on the condition that he does something for her in exchange – pilot a mecha for an organization known as Cerebrum.

Agreeing to her request, Kyo is drawn into a world of fighting giant robots in a game-like world that he must save from Deutera Areas formed by aliens known as Gards-orm that threaten to destroy the earth. However, Kyo soon comes to realize that the world that he is living in might not even be real at all and begins to find that everything he is doing is strangely familiar. As he questions the nature of the reality he lives in, Kyo must continue to fight in order to protect the lives of those important to him.

== Characters ==
Kyo Sogoru (十凍 京, Sogoru Kyō)
Voiced by: Shintarō Asanuma (Japanese); Bill Lemas (English)
The protagonist, Kyō discovers the world he lives in is an illusion and must fight to save the real world and protect the people who still live within the illusory world. He is an enthusiastic and talented pilot and serves as the Altair Zegapain's Gunner.
Ryōko Kaminagi (守凪 了子, Kaminagi Ryōko)
Voiced by: Kana Hanazawa (Japanese); Tiffany Barrett (English)
Kyo's childhood friend, Ryōko is cheerful girl who dreams of becoming a film director and is a member of the high school Video Club. She is perceptive and is the first of Kyo's friends to "awaken" to the real world with a much easier transition than Kyo; as a Celebrant, she desires to protect things irreplaceable to her. Ryōko cares deeply for Kyo and doesn't want him to carry too many burdens by himself.
Shizuno Misaki (三崎 紫雫乃, Misaki Shizuno) / Yehl (イェル, Ieru)
Voiced by: Ayako Kawasumi (Japanese); Sandra Jacobs (English)
Shizuno is an elegant girl who knew and loved Kyo in his past life, before he was reborn. She acts as the Wizard of the Altair Zegapain, but later becomes Chris' partner after Arque's death. Shizuno is an expert of data salvage and saved Kyo, Ryoko, Toga, and many other Celebrants.
Shima (シマ)
Voiced by: Tomohiro Tsuboi (Japanese); Patrick Seitz (English)
Shima serves as President of the Student Council at Kyo's school and is the commander of the Oceanus, the base of operations for Kyo, Shizuno, and other Celebrants, and the leader of Celebram.
Minato (ミナト)
Voiced by: Marina Inoue (Japanese); Lisa Enochs (English)
Originally from the Sydney server, Minato serves as vice-president of the Student Council and Shima's second-in-command on board the Oceanus. She is generally cheerful and helpful towards Shima, who saved her when the Sydney server was being destroyed, but often left out of the loop concerning Shima and Shizuno's plans. Her true name is Emma Springrain; vice-commanders of Oceanus-class ships are code-named after words meaning port or wharf.
Kenta Kawaguchi (カワグチ ケンタ, Kawaguchi Kenta)
Voiced by: Hiroyuki Yoshino (Japanese); Chris Ogden (English)
One of Kyo's friends, Kawaguchi is member of the Swim Club. He and Kyo have not been on good terms because the latter broke up their old swim team and they frequently end up in fights.
Takeru Ushio (ウシオ タケル, Ushio Takeru)
Voiced by: Masayuki Katō (Japanese); Ryan Coughlin (English)
Ushio is of Kyo's friends who is a member of the Swim Club. He rejoins it when Hayase does since he actually had forgiven Kyo, but stayed away from him because of Kawaguchi and Hayase. He later dates Mizuki until the Maihama server is reset.
Toya Hayase (ハヤセ トウヤ, Hayase Tōya)
Voiced by: Hiroshi Kamiya (Japanese); Marcus Junkin (English)
Hayase is of Kyo's friends and a member of the Swim Club. He chooses to rejoin the Swim Club after accepting Kyo's apology and deciding that his desire to swim again is more important than past feelings.
Kei Tomigai (トミガイ ケイ, Tomigai Kei)
Voiced by: Akeno Watanabe (Japanese); Julie Ann Taylor (English)
Tomigai is Kyo and Ryoko's friend who willingly participates in most of Ryoko's film projects.
Mizuki Tachibana (タチバナ ミズキ, Tachibana Mizuki)
Voiced by: Yukana (Japanese); Jennifer Sekiguchi (English)
Ryōko's friend, a member of the Theatre Club, tennis club, and the volleyball team. She initially has feelings for Hayase, but was rejected when she confessed to him at the summer festival. Mizuki later happily dates Ushio until the server is reset.
Hayato Kuroshio (クロシオ ハヤト, Kuroshio Hayato)
Voiced by: Takanori Ōyama (Japanese); Sam Andrews (English)
A member of the Student Council, Kuroshio is a Celebrant and serves as an operator on the Oceanus. He originally came from the Shizuoka server and previously acted as a Zegapain Gunner.
Ayaka Irie (イリエ アヤカ, Irie Ayaka)
Voiced by: Ryōko Ono (Japanese); Bernadette Zita (English)
A member of the Student Council, Irie is a Celebrant and acts as an operator on the Oceanus. She previously served as a Zegapain Wizard and originally came from the Shizuoka server.
Sen'ichi Kurashige (クラシゲ 船一, Kurashige Sen'ichi)
Voiced by: Yasunori Matsumoto (Japanese); C. David Fries (English)
Kurashige is Kyō's science and homeroom teacher at Maihama Minami High School. He is the sponsor for the Swim Club, and is nicknamed "Kurage" by Kyo.
Mizusawa (ミズサワ)
Voiced by: Rina Satō (Japanese); Sandra Jacobs (English)
The nurse at Kyō's school who seems to be close to Kurashige and later accepts a marriage proposal from him. Kyo appears to go to Mizusawa when he needs advice or to discuss matters concerning school. She has noticed abnormalities with the world they live in, but has not shown any indication of awakening.
Koji Kaminagi (守凪 浩司, Kaminagi Kōji))
Voiced by: Hiromi Ōtsuda (Japanese); Hayden Rhone (English)
Ryoko's younger brother.
Misaki Sogoru (十凍 未沙季, Sogoru Misaki)
Voiced by: Aya Endo
Kyo's younger sister, a junior high school student.
Sachiko Tsumura (津村 さち子, Tsumura Sachiko)
Voiced by: Hiromi Ōtsuda
Sachiko is a Celebrant and third year student at school who was dating Hayase. Due to damage to her Meta-body data, she does not appear in the server, resulting in Hayase being unable to meet her in person. She has an expanded role in Zegapain ADP as a former gunner and wizard for the Oceanus.
Tōru Kanō (河能 亨, Kanō Tōru)
Voiced by: Tetsuya Kakihara
Tōru is a Celebrant who recorded the real Maihama on the "last day" before all of humanity was converted into Meta-Bodies shortly before he returned to the Maihama server. As the president of the Video Club, he was a friend of Ryoko. He was the previous vice-commander Minato for the Oceanus. He appears in Zegapain ADP.
Funaberi (フナベリ)
Voiced by: Yuko Kaida
The principal of South Maihama High School. Previously a quantum computer researcher, she is deeply involved in the development of the phantom form of humanity and the quantum server. Funaberi watches the movements of the Celebrants from within the Maihama server, but does not participate in their battles. She appears in Zegapain ADP.
Natsumi Kohakura (コハクラ ナツミ, Kohakura Natsumi)
Voiced by: Haruka Tomatsu
An older former junior high classmate of Kyo mentioned in passing as Kyo's unrequited crush. While said to have transferred to Okinawa, her meta-body appears as a phantom in the Maihama server. She has an unwavering trust in Kyo. She appears in Zegapain ADP.

=== Celebrant ===
Mao Lushen (マオ ルーシェン, Mao Rūshen)
Voiced by: Romi Park (Japanese); Michael Irish (English)
Lushen is the Gunner of the Garuda, a young man originally from Shanghai. Generally calm and level-headed, Lushen suspects that Shizuno knows more about the Gards-orm than she is willing to openly admit.
Jen May-Yu (美雨, Mei Ū)
Voiced by: Yui Makino (Japanese); Jenny Powell (English)
May-Yen's older twin sister, she is one of the Garuda's Wizards, who is also originally from Shanghai. She is also capable of acting as a Gunner in a limited capacity for the Oceanus' Caladrius unit.
Jen May-Yen (美炎, Mei Yen)
Voiced by: Akeno Watanabe (Japanese); Elizabeth Ginnett (English)
May-Yu's younger twin sister, she is one of the Garuda's Wizards, but occasionally works as the Wizard for Chris after Arque's death.
Chris Avenir (クリス アヴニール, Kurisu Avunīru)
Voiced by: Hiroshi Yanaka (Japanese); Doug Erholtz (English)
Chris is of the Hræsvelgr's pilots (the Gunner) and Arque's husband. He and Arque love each other very much.
Arque Avenir (アーク アヴニール, Āku Avunīru)
Voiced by: Aya Hisakawa (Japanese); Sarah Sido (English)
Arque is one of the Hræsvelgr's pilots (Wizard) and Chris' wife. She and Shizuno became friends when the Paris server still existed. She suffers from severe wet damage, which has damaged her memories.
Isola (イゾラ, Izora)
Voiced by: Kazusa Murai (Japanese); Jeni Good (English)
Isola is the commander of the Dvārakā, a ship like the Oceanus.
Toga Vital (トガ ヴィタール, Toga Vitāru)
Voiced by: Takahiro Sakurai
Toga is Altair's Gunner under Isola's command. He is the main character of the spin-off game, Zegapain XOR.
Sarah (サラ, Sara)
Voiced by: Miki Nagasawa
One of the Altair's Wizards under Isola's command, Sarah is partnered with Toga Vital and also appears in Zegapain XOR.
Meivelle Transferre (メイヴェル トランスフェイル, Meiveru Toransufeiru)
Voiced by: Omi Minami
One of the Altair's Wizards under Isola's command, Meivelle was originally rescued from a sinking warship. She is considered a genius of electronic warfare.
Mio Readiness (ミオ レディネス, Mio Redinesu)
Voiced by: Yui Horie
One of the Altair's Wizards under Isola's command, Mio seems to have a crush on Toga. She is also seen acting as the Hræsvelgr's Wizard for Muelle.
Saw Verbbinski (ソー バーヴィンスキー, Sō Bāvinsukī)
Voiced by: Kenichi Suzumura
The Garuda's Gunner who is under Isola's command, Saw also pilots the Dvaraka's Caladrius unit as Gunner.
Muelle (ムエージェ, Muēje)
Voiced by: Hikaru Midorikawa
The vice-commander of the Dvaraka and the Hræsvelgr's Gunner, Muelle appears frequently alongside Isola and seems to have a close relationship with her.
Insel (インゼル, Inzeru)
Voiced by: Atsushi Ono
Insel is the commander of the Corduax.
Dao-Yu (タオ ユウ, Tao Yū)
Voiced by: Tarou Yamaguchi
Dao is the commander of the Cagayan.
Île (イル, Iru)
Voiced by: Tomohiro Tsuboi
Île is the commander of the Deukalio.
Ostrova (オストロバ, Osutoroba)
Voiced by: Rina Satou
Ostrova is the commander of the Rwenzori.
Nisos (ニソス, Nisosu)
Nisos is the commander of the Ogiges.

=== AI ===
Lemures (レムレス, Remuresu)
Voiced by: Shinpachi Tsuji (Japanese); Tom Shelton (English)
Lemures is of the Oceanus class ship's AI captain.
Tarbo (タルボ, Tarubo)
Voiced by: Fumihiko Tachiki (Japanese); C. David Fries (English)
Tarbo is of the Oceanus class ship' AI units who serves as secondary commander.
Fosetta (フォセッタ)
Voiced by: Junko Okada (Japanese); Julie Ann Taylor (English)
Fosetta is of the Oceanus class ship' AI units. She mainly supports transferring the Zegapain, but is also responsible of monitoring interior sensors onboard Oceanus.
Ricerca (リチェルカ, Richeruka)
Voiced by: Mai Kadowaki (Japanese); Rachel Kempel (English)
One of the Oceanus class ship' AI units, Ricerca supports transferring the Zegapain and is capable of controlling the Caladrius as a Gunner or a Wizard.
Dita (ディータ, Dīta)
Voiced by: Eri Nakao (Japanese); Natasha Baker (English)
One of the Oceanus class ship' AI units, Dita monitors and directs the management and strategic functions of the Zegapain.
Rupa (ルーパ)
Voiced by: Misaki Kuno
Rupa is a character introduced in Zegapain ADP. Unlike other AI units, she can appear in the Maihama server.
Zega AI (ゼーガAI)
Voiced by: Mai (Japanese); Jeni Good (English)
Zega AI programming the conveys the conditions of the Zegapain to the flight crew (Gunner and Wizard).

=== Gards-orm ===
Abyss (アビス, Abisu)
Voiced by: Masayuki Katou (Japanese); Bill Lemas (English)
Abyss is one of the people with "light" who are constantly launching assaults on those without "light" in Anti-Zegapain ships in order to destroy servers.
Sin (シン, Shin)
Voiced by: Yukana (Japanese); Kelly Early (English)
Sin is Abyss' female partner who is as strong as he is.
Naga (ナーガ, Nāga)
Voiced by: Tomohiro Tsuboi
Naga is CEO of iAL Corporations, who advocated limitless human evolution through quantum servers, where humanity lives forever.
The priest (僧, Sō)
Voiced by: Susumu Chiba
Shima's original Meta-Body who Naga's aide and initially supported his technology.
Toga Dupe (トガ デュープ, Toga Dyūpu)
Voiced by: Takahiro Sakurai
Toga Dupe is a Gards-orm replica of Toga Vital created from his lost character and memory data salvaged by Gards-orm. He is the main character of Zegapain NOT.
Calm (カーム, Kāmu)
Voiced by: Rie Kugimiya
Calm is a Wizard for the Gards-orm, who is skilled in close range combat and appears in Zegapain NOT.
Nemmon (ネモン, Nemon)
Voiced by: Atsuko Enomoto
Nemmon is a test Wizard for the Gards-orm who appears in Zegapain NOT.
Klarca (クラルカ, Kurarika)
Voiced by: Mai Nakahara
Taciturn and dedicated to her duty, Klarca is a Gards-orm Wizard who appears in Zegapain NOT. She excels in the processing of information and reconnaissance missions.
Nahusha (ナフシャ, Nafusha)
Voiced by: Unshō Ishizuka
Nahusha is the commander of the Oceanus class ship Larnax on Gards-orm side who first appears in Zegapain NOT. Serving the Gards-orm as an intelligence officer, he specializing in seizing and analyzing enemy technology. He holds a deep grudge against the Celebrants and humanity.
Coraggio (コラッジオ, Korajjio)
Voiced by: Kazuya Nakai
Coraggio is a gunner for the Gards-orm who is harsh and righteous. He appears in Zegapain NOT.
Nimbus (ニンバス, Ninbasu)
Voiced by: Maaya Sakamoto
Nimbus is a gunner for the Gards-orm and a member of the Gards-orm's S.D. Elite posted at Uenomiya who appears in Zegapain NOT.
Vabol (ヴァボル, Vaboru)
Voiced by: Joji Nakata
A Gards-orm soldier introduced in Zegapain ADP. Though physically intimidating in appearance, he has a scholarly nature.
Neve (ネーヴェ, Neve)
Voiced by: Ai Kobayashi
A Gards-orm soldier introduced in Zegapain ADP.

== Anime ==
The anime television series was compiled and released on nine DVD sets from 2006 to 2007. The series was released on Blu-ray boxset in September 2010.

=== List of episodes ===
No.	Title	Directed by	Written by	Original release date
1	"Entangle"; Transliteration: "Entanguru" (Japanese: エンタングル)	Junichi Watanabe	Mayori Sekijima	April 6, 2006
Kyo Sogoru finds that he is the only one who can see Shizuno Misaki, a beautiful girl who invites him to play a game where he must save the world.
2	"Cerebrum"; Transliteration: "Sereburamu" (Japanese: セレブラム)	Masahito Otani	Akira Okeya	April 13, 2006
Kyo finds that strange things are happening in his world – like his friends disappearing from sight and Shizuno appearing only when he is alone. He agrees to continue helping her if she will appear in a film he and his friend, Ryoko Kaminagi, are filming.
3	"Deutera Zone"; Transliteration: "Defutera Ryōiki" (Japanese: デフテラ領域)	Katsuichi Nakayama	Sadayuki Murai	April 20, 2006
As Kyo plays a game given to him by Student Council President Shima, he begins to ask what reality he lives in.
4	"Shanghai Server"; Transliteration: "Shanhai Sābā" (Japanese: 上海サーバー)	Masakazu Hishida	Masashi Kubota	April 27, 2006
May-Yu, May-Yen, and Lu Sheng are determined to save the corrupted Shanghai Server with help from Kyo and Shizuno. When the server is destroyed, Kyo discovers the truth behind what is reality and what is a dream. Zegapain Caladrius is sacrificed in the mission.
5	"Déjà Vu"; Transliteration: "Deja Byu" (Japanese: デジャビュ)	Masato Miyoshi	Sadayuki Murai	May 4, 2006
Kyo convinces himself that Maihama and all of his friends are real. However, in his increasing confusion, he fails to appear for battle when the Oceanus needs him most. The Cerebrants must defend themselves against the enemy who appears at last, Abyss.
6	"Meta‐Body"; Transliteration: "Gentai" (Japanese: 幻体)	Hiroaki Kudō	Mayori Sekijima	May 11, 2006
Kyo tries to prove that what he feels and experiences within his world are real, but instead becomes temperamental as he realizes that even his friends may be nothing more than illusions. When he tries to leave Maihama to affirm the reality of his world, Shizuno finally explains the truth. The Oceanus is joined by Chris and Arque Avenir. Zegapain Garuda suffers massive damage, requiring it to be reconstructed.
7	"Lost Soul"; Transliteration: "Mayoeru Tamashī" (Japanese: 迷える魂)	Masahito Otani	Masashi Kubota	May 18, 2006
Finally convinced that Maihama is an artificial illusion, including those cares most about, Kyo spends the day with Ryoko at the aquarium, who notices he has changed despite how he acts otherwise.
8	"On the Other Side of the Water"; Transliteration: "Mizu no Mukōgawa" (Japanese: 水の向こう側)	Masato Miyoshi	Akira Okeya	May 25, 2006
Memories that Kyo does not recall and off-hand comments from his comrades hint that Kyo's past is more complex than he realizes. Accompanied by May-Yu, he goes to see the real Maihama so he will experience the pain of reality and know why he must continue to protect his illusory world.
9	"Wet Damage"; Transliteration: "Wetto Damēji" (Japanese: ウエットダメージ)	Masakazu Hishida	Katsuhiko Takayama	June 1, 2006
Chris reveals to Kyo that while the data of bodies can be reconstructed, memories that are lost can never be recovered – Arque has lost a great deal of hers from wet damage. Kyo and Ryoko get into a disagreement and Kyo questions the pain he feels from emotion.
10	"Again, Summer Comes"; Transliteration: "Mata, Natsu ga Kuru" (Japanese: また、夏が来る)	Hiroaki Kudō	Sadayuki Murai	June 8, 2006
Ryoko uses a video tape from Tōru Kanō to create a new film, not realizing that it is a sign she may "awaken" to the real world soon. She and Kyo make up during the Summer Festival.
11	"Lingering Illusions"; Transliteration: "Nokoru Maboroshi" (Japanese: 残るまぼろし)	Masahito Otani	Mayori Sekijima	June 15, 2006
Arque spends her last days making lasting memories with Chris, Kyo, Shizuno, and Ryoko. Sin and Abyss return and Ryoko begins to "awaken".
12	"The Awaken"; Transliteration: "Mezameru Mono-tachi" (Japanese: 目覚める者たち)	Seiki Takuno	Akira Okeya	June 22, 2006
The crew of the Oceanus survey potential Cerebrant candidates, which include Ryoko, Hayase, and Tomigai. Ryoko fully awakens and she spends the day with Kyo and asks to see the real world someday with him.
13	"A New Wizard"; Transliteration: "Aratanaru Wizādo" (Japanese: 新たなるウィザード)	Naomichi Yamato	Masashi Kubota	June 29, 2006
Ryoko joins the crew of the Oceanus and goes around filming the real world as she wished. She becomes Kyo's new Wizard and proves to be an exceptionally skilled pilot. However, tragedy strikes when the Zegapain Altair is struck by Sin in the Anti-Zegapain Coatlicue and Ryoko's apparition data is destroyed.
14	"Memories of Destruction"; Transliteration: "Horobi no Kioku" (Japanese: 滅びの記憶)	Masakazu Hishida	Akira Okeya	July 6, 2006
Kyo must overcome his grief over Ryoko's loss while Lu Sheng reveals what caused humanity to be stored within servers in the first place. Shizuno desperately searches through the raw combat data of the Altair and finds Ryoko's data compressed in the mecha's memory.
15	"Reincarnation"; Transliteration: "Ri'inkānēshon" (Japanese: リインカーネーション)	Masahito Otani	Katsuhiko Takayama	July 13, 2006
Things seem to be going right for Kyo – Ryoko will come back, he's finally made up with Kawaguchi, and his friends are happy. But the world itself is acting strange and Kyo finally discovers the server can only simulate a limited time period before resetting itself. Zegapain Hraesvelgr is heavily damaged in the mission in a failed attempt to defeat Anti-Zegapain Coatlicue.
16	"Battlefield of Rebirth"; Transliteration: "Fukkatsu no Senjō" (Japanese: 復活の戦場)	Hiroaki Kudō	Mayori Sekijima	July 20, 2006
The Maihama server resets and the summer school term starts again. Ryoko returns to the server, but is hospitalized and comatose. Kyo discovers that Ryoko can only exist as herself within the Altair, which causes pain for them as well as those around them.
17	"The Reconstructants"; Transliteration: "Fukugen Sareshi-mono" (Japanese: 復元されし者)	Naomichi Yamato	Masashi Kubota	July 27, 2006
While Shima and Shizuno go on an excursion on the repaired Zegapain Caladrius, Minato and the crew of the Oceanus must defend themselves against Sin, who has successfully infiltrated the ship to ask about the Cerebrants' reasons for fighting the Gards-orm. Pleased upon receiving Ryoko's answer, Sin restores Ryoko's damaged data.
18	"With False Wounds, Pain Withers"; Transliteration: "Itsuwari no Kizu, Itami wa Karete" (Japanese: 偽りの傷、痛みは枯れて)	Akira Yoshimura	Katsuhiko Takayama	August 3, 2006
Ryoko's data is repaired thanks to Sin's data transplant, but her emotional data component is locked within the Altair so she is seemingly emotionless in the server. She and Kyo explore the real world, where he affirms that while he and Ryoko are only apparitions, they will some day be able to touch the real world.
19	"Last Supper"; Transliteration: "Rasuto Sapā" (Japanese: ラストサパー)	Shinya Watada	Akira Okeya	August 10, 2006
A suspicious Lu Sheng confronts Shizuno over dinner in the Maihama server concerning her recent actions and her identity as "Yehl". Kyo and Ryoko attempt to defend the Maihama server from Sin and Abyss in the Anti-Zegapain Coatlicue, but are devastated when it is destroyed, unaware that Lu Sheng and Shizuno are still somehow alive along with everyone else.
20	"Yehl, Shizuno"; Transliteration: "Ieru, Shizuno" (Japanese: イェル、シズノ)	Masahito Otani	Sadayuki Murai	August 17, 2006
Shizuno and Shima reveal that the Maihama server is safe because it was moved on to the moon a while back by the previous Kyo with Shizuno and Shima. Shizuno and Kyo work together again and she reveals how they initially met and that he was the one who named her "Shizuno Misaki".
21	"Warriors..."; Transliteration: "Senshi-tachi..." (Japanese: 戦士たち。。。)	Hiroaki Kudō	Mayori Sekijima	August 24, 2006
Shima reveals Cerebrum's plan for the final battle against the Gards-orm and for the resurrection of humanity. When Kuroshio believes the best option would be to become Gards-orm instead of gaining a true body and leaving the server, Shima attempts to reveal the real nature behind their enemies only to collapse from dry damage.
22	"G-Phaetus"; Transliteration: "Jifeitasu" (Japanese: ジフェイタス)	Naomichi Yamato	Masashi Kubota	August 31, 2006
Shizuno takes care of Shima, revealing that he is actually a clone of the real Shima, a Gards-orm who turned against his own kind to bring back humanity. Minato takes his place as the commander of the Oceanus and the Cerebrants begin to execute their Final Plan: Project Resurrection. The Gards-orm begin expanding their destructive Deutera Areas on earth.
23	"The Unsinking Moon"; Transliteration: "Shizumanai Tsuki" (Japanese: 沈まない月)	Shinya Watada	Katsuhiko Takayama	September 7, 2006
The Altair and Garuda successfully infiltrate the Gards-orm base after fighting Abyss and Sin, only to enter the Gards-orm's quantum computer and be confronted by Naga and his views on the nature of life and humanity.
24	"A Drop of Light"; Transliteration: "Hikari no Hitoshizuku" (Japanese: 光の一滴(ひとしずく))	Masahito Otani	Akira Okeya	September 14, 2006
Kyo, Ryoko, Lu Sheng, and May-Yu meet the real Shima, who waited for them and believes that they may not be able to execute Project Resurrection. The Altair and Garuda fight back against Sin and Abyss' Anti-Zega unit while the rest of the Oceanus' crew bid a final goodbye to Shima.
25	"Is the Maihama Sky Blue?"; Transliteration: "Maihama no Sora wa Aoi ka" (Japanese: 舞浜の空は青いか)	Katsuichi Nakayama	Sadayuki Murai	September 21, 2006
Forced to abandon the Oceanus, its crew returns to the Maihama server and believes they have failed to recover the Maihama server and the resurrection system; however, a parting gift from Shima brings new hope. The battle between the Gards-orm and the Cerebrants enters the Maihama server and Sin is finally defeated. Shizuno's true nature as "Yehl" is revealed while Kyo confesses his love to Ryoko before he and Shizuno leave to finish off the Gards-orm once and for all.
26	"All Things in Nature"; Transliteration: "Ari to Arayuru Mono" (Japanese: 森羅と万象(あらゆるもの))	Hiroaki Kudō	Mayori Sekijima	September 28, 2006
After destroying G-Phaetus, Kyo and Shizuno race to stop the expanding Deutera Areas on Earth by destroying their orbital base while carrying the Maihama server and the resurrection system's data compressed in the Altair. Kyo finally defeats Abyss, while Shizuno stabilizes the system and eliminates the Deutera Areas with help from Minato and the other crew members. Humanity's resurrection and restoration of the world finally begins.

=== Films ===
A compilation film, Zegapain Adaptation, was released in 2016 to celebrate the series' tenth anniversary. Using footage from the TV series interspersed with new animation and characters, Zegapain Adaptation uses the concept of the server "loops" in telling its story, and is revealed by the end of the film to be a prequel to the events of the first episode of Zegapain.

A sequel film, titled Zegapain STA, was released by Sunrise's parent company, Bandai Namco Filmworks, on August 16, 2024. The film is divided into two arcs - Reminiscence Arc, which recaps the events of the series and Zegapain ADP, and the Olta Moda Arc, which focuses on events after the series and the appearance of a new threat to Kyo and his friends.

== Video games ==
Two Xbox 360 games based on the anime have been released in Japan. The first, Zegapain XOR, was released in July 2006. The second, Zegapain NOT, a follow-up to Zegapain XOR, was released on December 7, 2006. Both titles were developed by Cavia and published by Bandai Namco Games.

The first game, published by Bandai, is called Zegapain XOR and was released in Japan on July 27, 2006. The game is similar in nature to Zone of the Enders. A mech action game, the player controls Cerebrant Toga Vital and the plot runs parallel to the events of the anime. Zegapain XOR is set on the Oceanus-class ship Dvaraka and commanded by Isola, a recurring character in the anime series. Several characters who appear in the game make brief appearances in the anime series.

A second game, titled Zegapain NOT, was released on December 7, 2006, in Japan. Also based on the anime series, Zegapain NOT is a sequel and companion to Zegapain XOR and continues the storyline of the previous game. The game features a special online mode that allows for cross-disc online play, enabling players with Zegapain XOR to play against players with Zegapain NOT. The game has over 3,000 ways to customize your character.

The main character is Toga Dupe, Toga Vital's lost character and memory data salvaged by Gards-orm, who controls the Anti-Zega Coatlicue. The story is set and told from the point of view of the Gards-orm, the antagonists to the heroes in the anime and Zegapain XOR.

== Other media ==
=== Manga ===
The manga adaptation by Gou Yabuki, Zegapain Gaiden: AI AlWAYS, was serialized in the monthly magazine Dengeki Daioh from August 2006 to October 2006. A second manga based on the events of Zegapain XOR, Side-B N, appears on the official site for Zegapain XOR. It has nine chapters available for preview. Both were compiled into tankōbon format in Japan.

=== Radio drama ===
The radio drama Zegapain audio drama OUR LAST DAYS was released on October 25, 2006, in Japan.

Episode 1: "The Children of OCEANUS"
Episode 2: "entanglement 13.3"
Episode 3: "our last days"

=== Guidebooks ===
Zegapain Visual Fan Book, a guide recording the Zegapain material and plotline, was released on March 13, 2007, in Japan. The guide features illustrations, articles on character, setting, and mechanics, conception of the story and how the setting was chosen, as well as staff interviews, which director Masami Shimoda and series creator Takehito Ito, and voice actors Shintaro Asanuma (Kyo) and Kana Hanazawa (Ryoko).

Another guidebook, Zegapain File Salvage, was released on November 10, 2010, in Japan. Zegapain File Salvage includes information on creation and conception of the series's plot and setting, initial and final designs for characters and mecha, and exclusive illustrations by various artists. The guide also includes interviews by Shintaro Asanuma, Kana Hanazawa, Ayako Kawasumi (Shizuno); mecha designers Rei Nakahara, Sunrise DID, and Kozo Yokota; and staff members Masami Shimoda and Hiroyuki Hataike.

=== Novels ===
Two novels were written for Zegapain and are side-stories to the anime series and video games. The first was published in June 2009 and features a recently awakened Cerebrant, Kurou Hayate, who finds Regina, a girl with an unusual meta-body, during an energy supply run aboard a Zega-tank; the story follows how they struggle to learn how they are irreplaceable even as data. The second novel was published in December 2011 and focuses on Mao, a young man with amnesia, who finds himself fighting monsters in order to escape from a town in the desert and suddenly awakens as a Cerebrant.
