= Minowa (surname) =

Minowa (written: 箕輪 or 美濃輪) is a Japanese surname. Notable people with the surname include:

- Ikuhisa Minowa (美濃輪 育久) (born 1976), Japanese mixed martial artist and professional wrestler
- Yoshinobu Minowa (箕輪 義信) (born 1976), Japanese footballer
- Yutaka Minowa (箕輪 豊), Japanese animator
- Craig Minowa, (born 1973), American musician (nee Craig Richardson)
- Sachi Minowa, (born 1996), Filipina-born Japanese volleyball player (real name Alyja Daphne "Jaja" Santiago)
