= Lord of Lords: Ryū Knight =

Japanese anime television series

- Promotional TV Tokyo poster featuring the main cast
- Also known as: Lord of Lords: Ryū Knight

Japanese name
- Kana: 覇王大系リューナイト
Transcriptions
- Revised Hepburn: Haō Taikei Ryū Naito
- Genre: Fantasy, mecha
- Created by: Takehiko Itō; Hajime Yatate
- Developed by: Hiroyuki Hoshiyama
- Directed by: Toshifumi Kawase
- Music by: Michiru Ōshima; Toshihiko Sahashi
- Country of origin: Japan
- Original language: Japanese
- No. of episodes: 52

Production
- Producers: Hideyuki Tomioka (TV Tokyo); Masakatsu Kozuru (Sotsu Agency); Noriko Kobayashi (Sunrise)
- Production companies: TV Tokyo; Sotsu Agency; Sunrise

Original release
- Network: TXN (TV Tokyo)
- Release: April 22, 1994 – March 28, 1995

Related
Further information
Manga
Written by	Takehiko Itō
Published by	Shueisha
Magazine	V Jump
Original run	1994 – 1995
Volumes	3
Original video animation
Adeu's Legend
Directed by	Masashi Ikeda
Produced by	Hideyuki Tomioka
Written by	Katsuyuki Sumisawa
Music by	Keiichi Oku; Toshihiko Sahashi
Studio	Sunrise
Released	July 21, 1994 – September 25, 1995
Episodes	13
Original video animation
Adeu's Legend II
Directed by	Tsukasa Dokite
Produced by	Hideyuki Tomioka
Written by	Akemi Omode
Music by	Jun'ichi Kanezaki; Toshihiko Sahashi
Studio	Sunrise
Released	December 18, 1995 – May 25, 1996
Episodes	4

Lord of Lords: Ryū Knight (覇王大系リューナイト, Haō Taikei Ryū Naito) is a Japanese anime television series created by Takehiko Itō, produced by Sunrise and directed by Toshifumi Kawase that aired in Japan from April 5, 1994 to March 28, 1995. Two OVA series comprising 17 episodes total, as well as two video games and a manga adaptation by Itō was published in Shueisha's V-Jump magazine from 1994 to 1995.

Both the anime and manga were planned simultaneously as a media mix project.

== Plot ==
Ryū Knight tells the story of Adeu, a boy who lives his life by the "Ethos of Chivalry" (a code of conduct similar to the Knightly Virtues). He is on a quest to seek the Earth's Blade, a gigantic sword which is capable of reaching the sky from the ground. Along the way, he meets Paffy, who is a princess, and her two escorts: Sarutobi, a ninja, and Izumi, a priest. Together, they partake on an adventurous journey in which he comes across many villains, at first composed of thieves and bandits who are after the Ryu mechs, which are far stronger than the normal mechs (henceforth referred to as Solids). The plot expands as the series progresses.

== Characters and their Ryū Units ==
- Adeu Waltham: Ryū Knight Zephyr; with Spirit Stone, class-changes to Ryū Paladin Lord Zephyr
- Sarutobi: Ryū Ninja Bakuretsumaru; with Spirit Stone, class-changes to Ryū Ninja Master Bakuretsumaru
- Izumi: Ryū Priest Baurus; with Spirit Stone, class-changes to Ryū High Priest Baurus
- Paffy: Ryū Mage Magidora; with Spirit Stone, class-changes to Ryū Wizard Magidora
- Katze: Ryū Gunner Derringer (also spelled as Delingar), class-changes to Ryū Wyatt Derringer
- Hittel: Ryū Gunner Derringer (both Katze and Hittel, as brother and sister, can control Derringer), class-changes to Ryū Wyatt Derringer
- Gesshin: Ryū Samurai Hayatemaru; class-changes to Ryū Kaiden Hayatemaru
- Gratches: Ryū Chief Shinebaram; class-changes to Ryū Grand Chief Shinebaram
- Galden: Dark Knight Steru; class-changes to Rune Knight Steru

== Songs ==
=== TV Version ===
Opening themes:

1. "Good-bye Tears" by Yumiko Takahashi (episodes 1–28)
2. "RUN ~Kyou ga Kawaru Magic~" (Run 〜今日が変わるMagic〜) by Hitomi Mieno (episodes 29–52)

Ending themes:

1. "Hitomi ni Diamond" (瞳にDiamond) by Hitomi Mieno (episodes 1–28)
2. "Owaranai Natsu" (終わらない季節(なつ)) by Hitomi Mieno (episodes 29–52)

=== Adeu's Legend ===
Opening theme:

1. "Wing of Wind" (風の翼) by Hitomi Mieno

Ending theme:

1. "Point 1" (ポイント1) by Yumiko Takahashi

=== Adeu's Legend II ===
Ending theme:

1. "Yume ni Stay" (夢にSTAY) by Hitomi Mieno

== Media ==
=== Anime ===
The 52-episode Haō Taikei Ryū Knight anime series was produced by Sunrise and aired on TV Tokyo from April 22, 1994 to March 28, 1995. The anime was released in an official DVD box set by Bandai Visual.

=== Manga ===
A manga adaptation by Takehiko Itō was serialized monthly in Shueisha's V-Jump beginning in 1994. A total of three tankōbon chapter collections released in Japan from 1994 to 1995. Although no official English translation exists, the manga was published in Spanish by Planeta DeAgostini and in Italian by Planet Manga.

=== OVAs ===
Three OVAs were produced by Sunrise during and after the airing of the television series. They were:

- Lord of Lords: Ryū Knight — Adeu's Legend (覇王大系リューナイト アデュー・レジェンド, Haō Taikei: Ryū Naito – Adyū Rejendo), was released in 13 episodes from July 21, 1994 to September 25, 1995.
- Lord of Lords: Ryū Knight – Adeu's Legend II (覇王大系リューナイト アデュー・レジェンドII, Haō Taikei: Ryū Naito – Adyū Rejendo Tsū), subtitled as Adeu's Legend Final (アデュー・レジェンド・ファイナル, Adyū Rejendo Fainaru) in the last episode, was released in 4 episodes from December 18, 1995 to May 25, 1996.

=== Video game ===
Two video games related to the series were released:

- Lord of Lords: Ryū Knight – Road of Paladin (覇王大系リューナイト ロードオブパラディン, Haō Taikei: Ryū Naito – Rōdo Obu Paradin), an RPG developed by Japan Art Media and published by Bandai for the Super Famicom in 1994.
- Earthtia Saga: Larthur's Legend (アースティアサーガ ラーサーレジェンド, Āsutia Sāga: Rāsā Rejendo), an action point-and-click adventure game developed by Emotion Digital Software and published by Bandai for Mac OS and Windows in 1995.
