= Yutaka Minowa =

Japanese animator

- 箕輪 豊
- Occupations: Character designer, animation director

Yutaka Minowa (箕輪 豊, Minowa Yutaka) is a character designer and animation director who works with Madhouse, a Japanese animation company. His work is recognised in the Yoshiaki Kawajiri movies he has designed characters for, among them Ninja Scroll and Vampire Hunter D: Bloodlust. He also did the character design and animation direction for the short "Program" in The Animatrix.

== Works ==
List of works in anime
Year	Series	Crew role	Notes	Source
1989	The Five Star Stories	Assistant Animation Director		
1990–91	Record of Lodoss War	Sub character designer	OVA	
1993	Ninja Scroll	Character design, animation director	film	
1998	Outlaw Star			
2001	Vampire Hunter D: Bloodlust	Character design, animation director	film	
2003	The Animatrix	Animation director, character design	Ep. "Program"	
2007	Devil May Cry: The Animated Series	Character design, animation director, "Devil" Design		
2011	Blade	Prop design		
2013	Space Pirate Captain Harlock	Concept Character Design	film	
