= List of Outlaw Star characters =

The crew of the Outlaw Star (left to right): Melfina, Aisha, Gene, Jim, Suzuka

The following is a list of characters from the Japanese manga and anime Outlaw Star.

== Protagonists ==
Gene, Jim and Melfina are the regular crew of the Outlaw Star. Suzuka and Aisha are more independent and are part-time crew-members.

=== Gene Starwind ===
Voiced by: Shigeru Shibuya (Japanese); Bob Buchholz (English)

Gene Starwind (ジーン･スターウインド, Jīn Sutāuindo) is a 20-year-old bounty hunter and the main protagonist of the series who developed a fear of space flight and a hatred of pirates during an attack when he was 14. This attack resulted in his father's death at the hands of a band of mercenaries led by Ron MacDougall. Gene was thrown into an escape pod moments before their ship exploded, and landed on Sentinel III where he would remain until the beginning of the series. While on Sentinel III, Gene met the much younger Jim Hawking and the two went into business, forming a company called Starwind and Hawking Enterprises. It is in this capacity that Gene comes into possession of the bio-android, Melfina, and the revolutionary XGP spaceship which he christens the "Outlaw Star." This ultimately brings him into conflict with the forces of the tyrannical Kei Pirate chieftain, Lord Hazanko, and the cutthroat MacDougall Brothers.

Gene is a reckless thrill-seeker and lecherous womanizer who shamelessly flirts with almost every woman he meets. He would rather try to achieve his goals with a minimum of effort, and his brash attitude proves a continuous source of frustration to his partner, Jim. Despite his arrogant and immature nature, Gene does have a caring side to his personality and has proven himself capable of great acts of courage. After realizing Melfina had no recollection of her purpose or function, Gene promises to help her find her past and protects her from the various individuals in pursuit of her. Throughout the course of the series, he begins to develop feelings for Melfina, but is reluctant to open up to her for fear of making himself vulnerable.

Upon finally arriving at the Galactic Leyline, Gene comes to terms with his feelings with Melfina after she is forcibly removed to the center of the Leyline by its central computer. After being fatally wounded in a confrontation with Lord Hazanko, the Leyline transports his body to cyberspace so he can recover. There, he is reunited with Melfina who offers to grant him whatever his heart desires. Gene replies that there is nothing that the Leyline can give him and all he really wants is for her to come back with him. When he asks Melfina what she desires, she joyfully tells him that she too wants to return with him and be by his side forever. Subsequently, the two share a long and passionate kiss before preparing to leave the Leyline. However, their happiness is cut short when both learn Hazanko is also leaving the Leyline upon being granted all the power he desired. Realizing Hazanko now poses an existential threat to the universe, the two leave cyberspace and rejoin the Outlaw Star's crew to fight him to the death. In an intense battle on the outskirts of the Galactic Leyline, Gene ultimately manages to destroy Hazanko for good with the aid of the Outlaw Star and Melfina. Following the events at the Leyline, Gene returns to Sentinel III where he and Melfina are ultimately revealed to be in a romantic relationship. The series ends with him returning to deep space with the rest of the Outlaw Star's crew to seek out new adventures.

Gene is well armed with a variety of weapons, including a pistol, grenade launcher, knife, rocket launcher, etc. His special weapon, a Caster gun, fires special Caster shells; magic bullets that are effective against Tao priests and other entities protected against normal weaponry. Caster shells are projectile capsules containing a spell cast by a wizard that has been contained, allowing non-magic users to fire the spell from a gun. Caster shells are also numbered by power level (although not incrementally), the three most powerful being 4, 9, and 13. Caster shells are considered antiques, however, and are difficult to acquire. Some of the effects of the caster shells include opening up small controlled black holes in order to absorb an opponent, as seen by the shell being used effectively against Hamushi and ineffectively against Hazanko. Gene reserves these particular caster shells only for powerful opponents, since they carry the extreme danger of killing him if he uses them consecutively.

Gene's ear piercings are also incredibly useful to him, as they possess a communication device that serves like a two-way radio which allows him keep in contact with Jim, who holds the other communicator piercing. Although he openly voices his distrust of Aisha and Suzuka in Episode 21 he nonetheless cares about their safety as in Episode 18 he expresses gladness when he sees that they are OK during the ensuing inferno of the tournament building.

Gene bears many scars all over his body, a testament to the hardships that he has endured over his lifetime. The most noticeable are the two on his left cheek, just below his eye. These were all probably made after his father's ship was destroyed and he crashed on Sentinel III. In addition, Gene's name could be an oblique reference to Gene Roddenberry, the creator of Star Trek.

=== James "Jim" Hawking ===
Voiced by: Rica Matsumoto (Japanese); Brianne Siddall (English)

James "Jim" Hawking (ジム･ホーキング, Jimu Hōkingu) is an 11-year-old business partner and best friend of Gene Starwind, though how they met is unknown. He is the son of a famous computer hacker known as the "Computer Wizard." Jim serves as the team's computer expert, hacker, strategist, and back-up. Unlike Gene, he is responsible, concerned, and worries about the team's finances and plans, preferring to earn money the hard way rather than to take risks. Jim becomes good friends with fellow Outlaw Star crew member Aisha Clan Clan, who is in some ways his opposite: Jim gets treated like a child even though he acts like an adult, while Aisha, though an adult, acts like a child. Jim also looks up to the android Melfina as a mother figure (whom he occasionally has to protect from Gene's lecherous advances), and gets along well with the Outlaw Star's on-board computer, Gilliam II. Jim has trouble, however, trusting strangers such as Hilda, who first approaches him and Gene under false pretenses, and Suzuka, who tries to kill Gene and whose motives are unclear. Episode 20 of the anime tells the story of Jim's first love, a young girl named Hanmyo who, unknown to the crew, is a combat pilot charged with destroying the Outlaw Star and its crew. His name could be a nod to Jim Hawkins of Robert Louis Stevenson's Treasure Island. Despite his small stature he is also quite capable of firing advanced firearms with a frightening degree of accuracy including ones that are even bigger, and heavier, than he is, as evidenced in Episode 17. It is also shown in various episodes that Jim can drive vehicles with surprising skill for his age.

Jim modifies one of the Gilliam maintenance robots, changing its color from blue to pink and adding silly eyebrows. He says that he just felt like making one of them special. After this is done, he carries that one with him and uses it as his own personal link to Gilliam.

=== Melfina ===
Voiced by: Ayako Kawasumi (Japanese); Emily Brown (English)

Melfina (メルフィナ, Merufina) is a bio-android created by Professor Nguyen Khan when the Kei Pirates came to him and asked him to decode genetic engineering data found by them at the ancient ruins known as Grave of the Dragon, which the crew of the Outlaw Star also visited in episode 21. Due to the knowledge dating back to 30,000 years ago, the complexity of the information was so vast that even a great mind like his couldn't understand it all. Some time after she was created, both Melfina and the Outlaw Star were stolen from the Kei pirates by the outlaw Hilda, who intended to use them to find the Galactic Leyline. Melfina's appearance is of a petite and slender young woman with shoulder length black hair and large brown eyes. While her physical age appears to be eighteen, her real age is that of only two. She has no recollection of her past or why she was created, which often troubles her throughout the series. Later, on the planet holding the ruins of the Grave of the Dragon, she sings a mysterious song (the ending song for episodes 1-13) which possibly signifies the weight of the questions about her existence that she wants answered. Despite being an artificial humanoid, Melfina possesses both free will and human emotions as well as the physical need for food and rest (although for some unexplained reason she lacks the ability to dream). Her personality is sweet-natured, with a polite and loving -albeit generally naive- demeanor, and because of this Jim thinks of her as a mother figure. She's noted as having a natural talent for cooking, and serves as the Outlaw Star's official chef in addition to being ship's navigator.

After the death of Hilda, Melfina travels with Gene after he promises to find her purpose, and gradually begins to develop feelings for him. Later in the series, it is revealed that she was created to navigate to the Galactic Leyline, and is the only one able to act as a medium to access its vast powers. Because of this, the pirates referred to her as the "Maiden of the Leyline". In the last episode, the part of her spirit which was created to be the Maiden of the Leyline departs from her and relocates with the Leyline itself, meaning that Melfina is no longer bound to the Leyline and her past, and is subsequently freed from a forced destiny. While on the Leyline, Melfina and Gene finally admit their love for each other where they kiss and become a couple, and she later joins him in exploring space aboard the Outlaw Star.

Melfina navigates the Outlaw Star from within a cylindrical chamber on the bridge that rises from the floor and fills with a clear, liquid-like substance, supposedly to help her link with the ship. The liquid is most likely a stabilizing agent to help ensure that her link is static-free, and because of this she has to navigate without wearing any clothes. She covers herself with her arms across her chest in a formation resembling angel wings, and her lower area is obstructed by the chamber's outer retractable metal coverings. As part of Cartoon Network's editing, the show has her portrayed as wearing tight black shorts and a strapless bra.

=== Aisha Clanclan ===
Voiced by: Yūko Miyamura (Japanese); Lenore Zann (English)

Aisha Clanclan (エイシャ･クランクラン, Eisha Kurankuran?) is an 18-year-old Ctarl-Ctarl officer with a considerable ego and superhuman strength. She is also far more durable than any human; in episode 5, Gene shoots her at near-point blank range with a Caster shell that mimics a lightning bolt-type spell leaving Aisha merely stunned, while in episode 23 she is shown comfortably bathing in what seems to be molten lava. She also claims to have the best ears in the universe. While it is unknown if they are the best, she is shown to be able to hear small noises that no one else on the crew can. In episode 5, she claims to be immortal, but it is unknown whether or not this is based in fact or is merely Aisha's immense ego and racial pride. Even if it is true, it is more likely a reference to how difficult Ctarl-Ctarls are to kill than to an increased life-span. As with all Ctarl-Ctarl, Aisha has access to an ability referred to in the dub as "Beast Strength", where she taps into the primeval powers of her racial ancestors. This allows her to increase her strength and possibly her speed and durability, but is extremely energy-draining; Aisha burns a lot of calories by using this ability, and is always depicted as eating massive quantities of food afterwards. This ability is somehow tied to lunar bodies, both their presence and their phase, though it is unclear if these make it easier for her to access the ability, or if they reduce the amount of energy it drains. Using Beast Strength makes Aisha more animalistic in form and, apparently, in mentality; at less than full power, her fingernails elongate into claws, and she sprouts a tail, while at full power she assumes the form of a feline-like creature that resembles a white tiger with elongated ears.

Aisha was originally in charge of locating the Galactic Leyline for the Ctarl-Ctarl Empire, but after she unknowingly allowed Hot Ice Hilda to escape, her government ordered her to stay behind on Blue Heaven to look for clues as punishment. Aisha finds out that Gene Starwind is connected to Hilda and tries to pump him for information. However, Gene knows nothing of the Galactic Leyline, and eludes her by stunning her with a Caster and leaving her to pay the considerable restaurant bill she racked up. Later in the series, Aisha was able to trick Gene into letting her on board the Outlaw Star during the Space Race, where she finds out that the MacDougall Brothers have more information on Hilda than they do. Aisha then decides to join the crew, since they are the ones who were indirectly responsible for her demotion in the first place.

During the series, Aisha entered the universe's strongest woman tournament whilst under the guise of a wrestler called "Firecat" (the real Firecat had been captured by Aisha, and was kept tied up and gagged in a locker.) The Ctarl-Ctarl were banned from the tournament five years before when one transformed into her beast form and, after being reprimanded and disqualified for biting off her opponent's ear, went berserk and killed over nine hundred people with thousands injured. In the final fight with Iraga of the Anten Seven, Iraga transformed into a wolf, forcing Aisha to transform into a tiger. Aisha eventually defeated Iraga and secured her place as the strongest woman in the universe. As Ctarl-Ctarl were banned from the competition, it is unknown whether Aisha was crowned the universe's strongest woman or simply disqualified after the final fight.

Aisha can be rather absent-minded at times, acting on rash impulse and not really caring about anyone other than herself, and she tends to act like a child. She does have a closer relationship with Jim over the course of the series, and starts to concern herself with his well-being, acting like an older sister to him in many ways. In spite of her brash, impulsive, carefree, childlike attitude she has shown that she is quite religious as in Episode 19 she recites what appears to be a prayer in her own native language of the Ctarl-Ctarl when it seems that Duuz has died. It is implied that she finds Gene and his shameless recklessness, thrill-seeking lecherousness and womanizing flirtatiousness nature amusing as in episode 23 she teases him by squeezing her bare naked breasts out from between her arms saying how he "came all this way here just to see if he can get a sneak peek look at ol' Aisha naked in her birthday suit" to him.

=== "Twilight" Suzuka ===
Voiced by: Sayuri Yamauchi (Japanese); Wendee Lee (English)

"Twilight" Suzuka (黄昏の鈴鹿, Tasogare no Suzuka) is a female Ultra Class A ninja-assassin who only kills when the sun is setting. Her preferred weapon of choice is a bokken, or wooden sword, which through secret, semi-mystical swordplay can be used to slice metal like a cleaver (in her premiere episode, she sliced through a delivery truck that nearly ran her over), and smash concrete. On the next stroke, however, it will land only a knockout blow on her opponent. She uses a wooden sword instead of a metal one to prevent it from being identified by metal detectors as a weapon. She first appears when she tries to kill Gene Starwind's friend Fred Luo as part of her contract with a rival weapons seller. Gene is able to outsmart her and force her to consent to come after him before she kills Fred as part of her pride. However, in her next appearance, Suzuka saves Melfina from a Kei Pirate and decides to help the group against the Kei Pirates, mainly to go after a member of the Anten Seven named Hitoriga, who killed her family. Surprisingly, Suzuka seems to know more about the Kei Pirates than the rest of the crew. Among the various members on Gene's ship, Suzuka could best be considered the lone wolf, relying very little on outside help to accomplish her goals. To add to her already enigmatic demeanor, she frequently disappears at ports to take care of "business." She is quiet and pensive, and once tells Gene that she 'sticks around' only because she finds him interesting, much to his chagrin. Throughout the series, there are only three known battles that she has lost; once in the past to Hitoriga (who killed her family), once to Gene, and once to Shimi (possibly due to a meal Aisha had cooked rather than lack of skill).

Much about Suzuka's past is unknown, such as why the Kei pirates would target her family, how she survived, and who trained her. Even her age is never really mentioned during the run of the series, though she is estimated to be around Gene's age. All that is known is that her pursuit of the Kei Pirates is of personal nature, particularly towards the assassin Hitoriga. Near the ending of the series, it is implied that she has feelings for Gene. During her fight with Hitoriga, he says, "Well wonders never cease. I'm surprised that you would even consider a partner (referring to Gene Starwind). So Suzuka, are you in love with him?" She responded by telling him that he will hear her answer after she kills him, as a sort of gift in order to see him off to the after life. After the fight and Suzuka wins, she never tells Hitoriga her true feelings for Gene so the nature of her feelings for him have been left unresolved. It is likely that this was due to her awareness of Gene's feelings for Melfina, who tells him on the crew's way to rescue Melfina (after Gene asks Suzuka why she joined them on this mission) that he needs to come to terms with his own feelings, causing Gene's eyes to widen. Despite her distant demeanor she genuinely cares for the crew of the Outlaw Star, Gene in particular. This is evident in Episode 21 when she and Gene have a conversation in the ruins of The Way of the Dragon. Gene confides in Suzuka, telling her he made a promise to Melfina to find out about her past and who she was, but since that he hadn't found out anything is unsure if he can keep it. Suzuka then consoles him, saying that it isn't true and that he came all the way to a place like The Way of the Dragon to investigate it.

When Gene, Melfina, and Jim venture into space after returning to Sentinel III following the final battle with Hazanko, Suzuka (along with Aisha) unexpectedly rejoins them on the Outlaw Star, having hitched a ride with a repairman who fixes the ship after it breaks down in space. Although aware that Gene, Jim, and Melfina are traveling to places that she has been to before, Suzuka explains that she rejoined them because she thought it would be quite interesting to travel with them again.

Cartoon Network heavily edited references to Suzuka being an assassin on the first episode she appeared in (Episode 6) when this show aired on Toonami, though some references managed to slip by.

== Supporting characters ==
=== "Hot Ice" Hilda ===
Voiced by: Toshiko Fujita (Japanese); Mary Elizabeth McGlynn (English)

"Hot Ice" Hilda (熱き氷のヒルダ, Atsuki Kōri no Hiruda) is an Outlaw who, for unknown reasons, has a problem with the Kei Pirates. Not much is known about Hilda from before she met Gene. She is responsible for taking out one of the Pirate Guild's leaders at the cost of an arm and an eye. In retaliation, she stole the XGP. After being pursued by pirates, she came to Sentinel III, where she witnessed Gene and Jim kill the assassin 'Death' Rob. She hired the two, under the name Rachel Sweet, to perform jobs for her. When the pirates caught up with them, her true identity was revealed. She tried to kill Gene, but he was able to overpower her, and at gunpoint she revealed the existence of Melfina. Escaping with Gene, Jim, and Melfina, they made their way to Blue Heaven where, while resting, they were attacked by outlaws sent by the MacDougall Brothers. After kicking one of her pursuers in the groin, they escaped to the Farfallas system's sun, where the XGP was being held in an orbiting asteroid. The pirates used a Tao Spell to track them down and, thanks to the MacDougall brothers, Hilda's ship Horus was destroyed. Hilda escaped and tried to reach the XGP by climbing the pirate's grappling cable. However, the cable snapped, sending Hilda, the Tao Master, and her ship into the sun. Hilda stopped the Tao Master from making a final attack on the XGP by grabbing on to her leg and detonating a bomb hidden in her tooth, killing both of them. Her final words to Gene were that "Outlaws never go down easy, no matter what happens to them." In memory of her, Gene named the ship the Outlaw Star.

After Hilda dies, Gene has several visions of her, mainly at times when he is scared and believes that he is going to die (Episodes 15 and 25). This possibly suggests that there was more to their relationship than meets the eye, although he could just feel guilty for his powerlessness when he was unable to rescue her from Farfallas' gravity well. The two were hinted at having spent the night together in Blue Heaven. In the manga version however, it is revealed they did have a physical relationship.

Cartoon Network removed the scene in when Hilda commits suicide by detonating the bomb hidden in her tooth during the time it was running on Toonami, and instead made it seem that Hilda and the Tao Master died by sinking into Farfallas' sun.

=== Gilliam II ===
Voiced by: Takaya Hashi (Japanese); Peter Spellos (English)

The XGP's artificial intelligence system, Gilliam II (ギリアムII, Giriamu Tsu) is just as much a personality on board the Outlaw Star as any member of its crew. Primarily communicating through speakerphones, an interface on the bridge, and a seemingly limitless number of miniature maintenance robots, Gilliam is a constant companion of the crew, and assists them in all areas of the ship's upkeep – even including the kitchen-duty. Sporting a wryly sarcastic, if soft-spoken and humble, personality, Gilliam has been referred to as an "old man," and indeed, is almost always engaged in reminding the crew of their personal duties and responsibilities, much as a father-figure or a butler might. This often irritates Gene, who would rather sleep late and shirk chores, and Gilliam, as a result, is frequently compelled to confront Gene about his laziness and inadequacy. Gilliam also regularly voices concern over his "future prospects" due to the brash nature of Gene's captaining.

When first activated, Gilliam seems hesitant to allow Hilda, Gene or Jim access to the XGP, noting that a large portion of memory has been deleted from the ship's data bank – no doubt a result of the hacking used to divorce the ship from its previous owners. However, upon being ordered, Gilliam enlists them as the crew, and remains unquestioningly loyal to them and their cause afterwards.

Always boastful on the topic of the XGP's prowess and sure to proclaim it "the greatest ship in the galaxy" at any given opportunity, Gilliam is nevertheless burdened by a programming limitation, which disallows him to question the nature of his existence. A technical safeguard against rebellious and sentient AI, Gilliam is still sentient of the restriction, and so while unable to contemplate his own purpose in life, he can contemplate, and does lament, his inability to ask such a profound question. As such, he greatly empathizes with Melfina's quest to discover her identity (a task that he could never begin to attempt in regards to his own origin), and is always willing to exert himself to the fullest in her assistance. As much as he combs online databases available to him, however, he is never able to uncover any information that would help her.

As previously stated, Gilliam has a seemingly endless number of tiny maintenance robots to allow him to repair the Outlaw Star. While the majority of these robots are colored blue, Jim Hawking decides to paint one of them pink on a whim, and in subsequent episodes, Gilliam uses this pink robot as a means of speaking face-to-face with the crew more often than with the blue robots.

=== Fred Luo ===
Voiced by: Toshihiko Seki (Japanese); Ezra Weisz (English)

Fred Luo (フレッド・ロー, Fureddo Rō) is a 20-year-old arms dealer who, at some point in the past, hired Gene for a job, kicking off their friendship. He is known to be flamboyant and openly gay. After acquiring the XGP-15-A II spaceship, Gene seeks out Fred in the hopes of outfitting the newly christened Outlaw Star, with weapons and ammunition. Gene has no money, and attempts to impose upon his friendship with Fred, offering to repay him for outfitting the ship when he (Gene), "makes it big." Fred initially rejects Gene's offer, but agrees to outfit the ship, as a loan, after Gene saves Fred from Twilight Suzuka's assassination attempt. Fred discounts the final cost by 30%, roughly the equivalent cost of hiring an Ultra Class-A assassin like Suzuka.

Some time later, Fred agrees to pay the entry fee for Gene to enter the Heifong space race. He also loans Gene additional funds for expenses which Fred offers to comp if Gene finishes in the top-3. Ultimately, the Outlaw Star finishes in 4th place, overall, but places 1st among the privateer ships. Reasonably satisfied with their performance, Fred comps half of the money loaned to Gene for the race.

Fred is of ambiguous sexual orientation, and while he isn't shy about aggressively expressing a physical attraction to Gene, he shows that he is bi-sexual when he taken by Melfina's appearance at first sight and even suggests a flashy dress for her to wear during the Heifong space race. He is betrothed to a professional prize fighter named Reiko Ando, but told her he would not marry her unless she won the Strongest Woman in the Universe competition five times in a row. Reiko loses to Iraga on the verge of winning her 5th straight title, sparing Fred from having to marry her. In this same episode, Fred agrees to loan Gene money for a third time, bringing Gene's total debt to over 1.2 million wong (the Toward Stars Galaxy's currency).

Fred sometimes acts as an information broker to Gene when he is abroad. On several occasions, he passes on useful information to the crew of the Outlaw Star, free of charge.

At the conclusion of the series, it's implied that Fred loans Gene even more money to assist with the upkeep of the Outlaw Star. Gene prepares to set off on a new adventure, having never paid off a cent of the debt he owes to Fred.

Fred appears briefly with his two bodyguards in Angel Links.

=== Swanzo ===
Voiced by: Takeshi Aono (Japanese); Doug Stone (English)

Swanzo is a Corbonite and the chief mechanic at Blue Heaven. A short humanoid creature with amphibian features, Swanzo is unable to survive in a human environment and must wear a special containment suit outside his quarters. He was saved by Hilda when his ship was attacked by Ban pirates. His suit's translator has been known to glitch, and will occasionally speak in Corbonese. He says that he had a rather "hot relationship" with Hilda, although he never talked about anything specific.

After Farfallas, Gene returns to Blue Heaven and informs him of Hilda's death. As payback for what he still owed Hilda, Swanzo decides to give the Outlaw Star a free paint job and a registration number, which greatly assists the crew by legitimizing them as the ship's owners, a fact which allows them to overcome many technical hurdles in future business and governmental transactions.

=== Mikey ===
Voiced by: Katsuyuki Konishi (Japanese); Chip Nickey (English)

Mikey is Swanzo's human partner at Blue Heaven. He does not like to work for free. He also apparently had some dealings with Fred Luo and doesn't like the young merchant one bit.

=== Clyde ===
Voiced by: Toshihiko Nakajima (Japanese); Richard Plantagenet (English)

Clyde is the owner of Gene's favorite bar on Sentinel III. He and the waitress are friends of Gene and like to check in from time to time. He also seems to know about many bounties and acts as Gene and Jim's source of job information. He doesn't mind when Gene wrecks up the bar in a fight, as business always picks up once word gets out.

=== Iris ===
Voiced by: Akiko Kimura (Japanese); Rebecca Forstadt (English)

Iris is the waitress at Clyde's bar with unrealized romantic interests in Gene. Their relationship is comically unconsummated, very similar to that between Moneypenny and James Bond: although he is never involved with her, Gene is not above flirting with Iris and occasionally rubbing her rear end (this was cut from Cartoon Network airings). Likewise, Iris has feelings of envy when she sees Gene with other women, such as Hilda or Melfina. Her last appearance in the series is in the final episode, when she goes to the spaceport with Clyde to say goodbye to Gene before he sets off into space with Melfina and Jim.

Iris also appears in brief scenes alongside her boss, Clyde, in episode 5 of Angel Links, a spin-off of Outlaw Star. Iris gets excited at seeing Angel Links member Kosei, hugging him and pinching his cheeks, asking why he hasn't called her, and afterwards invites him and Jesia (a pirate girl trying to win Kosei's affections, whom Iris thinks might be a new girlfriend of Kosei's) to eat at a nearby restaurant.

== Antagonists ==
=== Ronald "Ron" MacDougall ===
Voiced by: Kazuhiro Nakata (Japanese); John Snyder (English)

Ronald "Ron" MacDougall (ロン･マクドゥーガル, Ron Makudūgaru) is the elder MacDougall Brother (35 years old). Calculating and calm under fire, he is the mastermind behind the MacDougall Brothers' entire mercenary operation and (by extension) one of the series' main antagonists alongside the Kei Pirate chieftain, Lord Hazanko. Ron has a past with Hilda. He uses a caster gun like Gene, but it is basically the barrel of a Caster fashioned in the style of a Shakujo, the staff often carried by Buddhist monks. Ron is a man who will take on any job so long as the money is right and he ends up finishing ahead of where he started. Be it pirates, Space Forces, or private contractors, he will consider anything viable and carry out the job only as it is stipulated, and no further than that. This is demonstrated by the fact that as soon as his contract with the Kei pirates that were pursuing Hilda was up, he immediately turned on them, attempting to kill both the pirates and Hilda, as well as destroying the XGP.

Gene accuses Ron of being the man who killed his father, and, as such, the MacDougalls are major antagonists throughout the first half of the show as Gene attempts to track them and exact revenge. Although Gene remembers seeing the El Dorado destroy his father's ship, however, Ron doesn't recall anything of the sort, noting that he has taken on so many similar jobs over his lifetime that he couldn't possibly remember them all. His ignorance of the incident only infuriates Gene more, but, because he possesses rare knowledge of the Galactic Leyline, Gene is always forced to hesitate when given a chance to finally kill him.

Despite his amoral personality, Ron is fiercely protective of his younger brother, Harry, who he considers his only family. At the Leyline, after Harry is mortally wounded by Hazanko, Ron becomes mad with grief and rage and subsequently attacks both Gene and Nguyen Khan. Gene counters Ron's caster attack with a powerful #9 shell, however, which propels him off the stone walkway and down into the sepia-colored Noise (video) like void below which leaves him severely wounded. He only lives because Harry, who had copied his memory and personality into the Shangri La's (the El Dorado was destroyed after Harry's duel in the asteroid field) Main Computer, is able to rescue and rejuvenate him inside of the ship. Both brothers defeated, they decide to temporarily retreat, although they vow that it isn't the last Gene will hear from the MacDougall Brothers.

=== Henry "Harry" MacDougall ===
Voiced by: Tsutomu Kashiwakura (Japanese); Steve Cannon (English)

Henry "Harry" MacDougall (ハリー･マクドゥーガル, Harī Makudūgaru) is the younger of the MacDougall Brothers (18 years old). Similar to Melfina, he is also a synthetic human, a test tube baby created in a lab using genetic material from that of another individual who had earlier died. Though usually calm and arrogant, he is prone to intense fits of rage and insanity.

In Harry's first confrontation with the crew of the Outlaw Star, he tries to hack into its systems. As a defensive measure, Gilliam shuts down and Harry encounters Melfina for the first time (Melfina was navigating the ship and thus was connected to its mainframe when the systems were shut down). From then on he developed an obsessive infatuation with her; claiming whenever they meet that they are one and the same and are the only ones capable of understanding each other and even tells Melfina directly at the Leyline that he loves her. However, his attempts to make Melfina fall in love with him all fail as his emotionally unstable personality frightens her, while Melfina harbours feelings for Gene. In episode 17, Harry even beats Melfina unconscious after she refuses to accompany him. Over the course of the series, Harry's body goes through numerous cybernetic enhancements, the first of which replaced his right arm with a mechanical prosthetic that allowed him greater strength and hacking capabilities. In the ruins of the Grave of the Dragon, Harry is nearly killed by one of Gene's caster shells which requires most of his body to be replaced with bio-android prosthetics that empower him with superhuman strength and speed as well as weapons in his arms and shoulders. The cybergenic upgrades also allow him to completely control and navigate the Shangri La (the El Dorado was destroyed after Harry's duel in the asteroid field, the Shangri La was the identical ship belonging to the MacDougalls) and pass through the outer barriers of the Galactic Leyline. Harry meets his end trying to defend Melfina from Hazanko at the gate to the Leyline. Although dying, the backup life support system kept him alive just long enough to delete the protective barriers created by Hazanko at the doors of the Leyline and tell Melfina a final 'Goodbye', fading away just before he got a chance to kiss her. Harry returns from cyberspace, close to death and stricken with grief. Before dying, Harry unlocks the entrance to where Melfina is being held and asks Gene to ask Melfina to sing the song she sang back at the Grave of the Dragons for him. Having seemingly made peace with his rival, Gene promises Harry to do that for him.

It is later noted that before departing to the Leyline he integrated himself with the mainframe computer of the Shangri La and created a "backup" of himself in case something happened to him while on the journey to the Leyline. The backup version of Harry is quoted as saying "...almost as good as the original" and is unaware of any of the events or experiences of that of the original Harry that took place in the Leyline, as evident when he asks Ron (who he has placed in the original Harry's chamber to heal) what happened to "my original" (Ron sadly replies "something too horrible to mention"). The copy of Harry then flies them away from the Leyline, promising that their conflict with Gene isn't over, and vowing revenge against the Outlaw Star crew for "crossing the MacDougall brothers."

=== Lord Hazanko ===
Voiced by: Seizō Katō (Japanese); Tom Wyner (English)

Lord Hazanko (破斬公, Hazankō) is a tyrannical Kei Pirate chieftain and one of the main antagonists of the series alongside the MacDougall Brothers. Due to his expertise in Tao Magic as well as the extent of his influence in both the 108 Suns and 108 Stars pirate guilds, he is greatly feared among the other guild leaders. Prior to the events of the series, Hazanko and the Space Forces oversaw the construction of the XGP and the bio-android, Melfina, as part of a top-secret project to find the legendary Galactic Leyline. However, the infamous Outlaw, "Hot-Ice" Hilda, stole both of the aforementioned items from their possession, thereby resulting in a galactic manhunt. While ultimately dying in combat against Hazanko's underlings, Hilda is able to pass on the XGP and Melfina to a young outlaw named Gene Starwind before her demise. Thereafter, Lord Hazanko and the forces under his command devote the rest of the series toward hunting down Gene and reclaiming their lost property by any means necessary.

Driven by his insatiable greed and ambition, Lord Hazanko seeks the Galactic Leyline at all costs in order to gain enough power to overthrow the current Kei Pirate leadership and conquer the universe. An extremely powerful Tao Master, he can deflect virtually any attack and use Tao magic to utterly lethal effect with little visible effort. At one point in the series, he demonstrates the vast extent of his power by reversing the fatal effects of a #4 Caster Shell and reemerging seemingly unscathed out of thin air. Upon having his wish for omnipotence granted by the Leyline, Hazanko transforms into a monstrous behemoth that poses an existential threat to all life in space. However, he is ultimately destroyed by Gene Starwind with the help of the Outlaw Star and Melfina.

=== Professor Nguyen Khan ===
Voiced by: Takeshi Aono (Japanese); Milton James (English)

Professor Nguyen Khan (グエン・カーン, Guen Kān) was one of the leading scientists on the Leyline Project. He has an odd personality, often speaking to himself, thinking out loud and repeating the same phrases multiple times in a row. A hyper-intellectual, his communication and personal deficiencies evidence a mentality pushed near if not into a mild form of insanity by information-overload. Khan's goal in life is to gain ultimate knowledge, which drives him to find the Galactic Leyline, a "machine-god" created by an extinct alien race that acts as a catalog for all of existence.

Khan first appears as a judge for the Heifong Space Race, recognizing the XGP as soon as it appears as an entrant in the competition. Afterwards he somewhat stalks Gene and his crew, going to extreme lengths to track them and their ship down. A shameless opportunist, Khan's only allegiance is to himself, and he is willing to use every conceivable ploy to achieve his goal of reaching the Leyline and attaining ultimate knowledge, switching sides and backstabbing practically every member of the cast. Later on in the series, it is revealed that he was the scientist who decrypted some of the ancient biotechnology found in the Grave of the Dragon ruins that led to Melfina's creation. He was also responsible for the development of the XGP15A-II and was a major factor in the Leyline Project. Aside from Hazanko, Khan is the only person in the series shown to have knowledge of voice recognition codes which tap into Melfina's hidden powers related to the Leyline. By uttering "It was you who broke my Meissen plate" in Melfina's presence, Khan shuts her down and forces Gene to infiltrate a high-security prison and retrieve the Leyline's coordinates from a prisoner being held there, threatening never to revive her unless Gene complies with his demands. After Gene begrudgingly fulfills his half of the deal, Khan is knocked unconscious after reviving Melfina, with the phrase "Breakfast is signalled with a silver spoon", and is subsequently abandoned by the crew.

Nevertheless, by siding with the MacDougall brothers Khan gains entrance to the Leyline, riding as a passenger in their ship after repairing Harry's damaged body with prosthetic enhancements. When Harry is mortally wounded in battle, however, Ron double-crosses and threatens to kill Khan, whose life is only spared by Gene's timely entrance. Afterwards, both Gene and Khan gain access to the Leyline's center when Harry, using the last of his automated suit's energy, hacks through the defenses of the Leyline's encrypted final portal.

Khan's goal for ultimate knowledge is fulfilled when he reaches the center of the Leyline shortly after Gene and Hazanko, making him the third and last member of the cast to do so alive. After that, he thanks Gene and Melfina before being entirely converted into the very concept of information itself: "I am data, and data is me."

=== Kei Pirates ===
The Kei Pirates (北旗（ケイ）の海賊, Kei no Kaizoku) are a group of Chinese space pirates who uses Tao magic led by the mysterious Tendo King. The only branches referenced in the series are the 108 Suns and 108 Stars.

The pirate guild most frequently referenced in the series are the 108 Suns, a Kei Pirate branch from the Hoppo system and recurring antagonists throughout the series. Centered around the Tendo King, the Kei Pirates' leader, the 108 Stars operate in smaller groups of 10 or 20, with the leaders of these groups acting as independents, pursuing their own interests. In the series, the group that pursues Gene Starwind and the rest of the crew of the Outlaw Star is led by a man named Hazanko. The members of said group possess a great power known as Sunjutsu (pronounced soon-joot-su), which is based on feng shui. They hunt Gene and his companions relentlessly, eventually sending the Anten Seven after them. The Seven and Hazanko are eventually defeated, yet the 108 Suns and the Kei Pirates as a whole live on.

The Anten Seven (暗天七人衆, Anten Nanajinshū or Anten Shichi), led by Hazanko, are an elite team of Tao masters and assassins within the 108 Stars who take their names from a variety of Japanese beetles. They were sent after Gene and the crew of the Outlaw Star. Each member has their own particular area of expertise, and they utilize their techniques according to whatever obstacles need to be overcome. Up until the discovery of the Galactic Leyline, it seems that they had worked alone. Four of them seem to be Tao masters and the rest are skilled in different fields.

==== Shimi ====
Voiced by: Yūsaku Yara (Japanese); Steve Bulen (English)

"A warrior whose skill is such, that there is no one in the Pirate Guild who has never heard of him."

Shimi (シミ), whose real name is Leilong (レイロン, Reiron), is the first assassin of the Anten Seven to be dispatched after Gene. Shimi initially sends his protege to deal with Gene. The night before the duel is set to take place, Shimi approaches Gene at a bar, introducing himself as Leilong. The two share a drink while discussing matters of life and death. Before leaving, Leilong confesses that he has been forced to kill people in the past, but always finds a way to show respect for his opponents. The next day, Gene manages to defeat Shimi's flunky, and only then does Leilong emerge and reveal himself to be the true assassin known as Shimi. In the ensuing battle, Leilong manages to overwhelm Gene and all his teammates who subsequently intervene on his behalf. Realizing that Gene is too injured to offer any further resistance, Leilong offers to settle things in a traditional Old West-style one-shot duel. Gene appears to win the duel only to find that Leilong's gun backfired, dealing him a mortal injury. Before seemingly dying, Leilong informs Gene that six other assassins are after him and he must remain vigilant. After having his body buried by Gene and the others, he digs himself out of his grave revealing that he rigged the gun to backfire in order to fake his own death, thereby freeing himself from the Kei Pirates and the life of an assassin

Shimi carries an immense backpack around with him, which is full of an assortment of weapons, including a sword, pistols, rockets, and a top-of-the-line Space Forces light shield. His footwear is equipped with miniature thrusters, allowing him to quickly move about and jump great distances. Despite being an experienced contract killer, Leilong is not without humanity as evidenced by the visible remorse he shows for his past deeds as well as the nonlethal incapacitation of Gene's allies in combat. Shimi is the only member of the Anten Seven that ultimately survives the events of the series.

==== Lady Iraga ====
Voiced by: Chiyako Shibahara (Japanese); Barbara Goodson (English)

"A werewolf with miraculous life force."

Lady Iraga (イラガ, Iraga) is the second assassin of the Anten Seven encountered by Gene and his crew. Defying Lord Hazanko, she entered into an intergalactic fighting tournament which decides the strongest woman in the universe. She is a member of the Hoke Shadow Boxing team, displaying incredible feats of strength and power enabling her to defeat Reiko Ando, the four-year consecutive strongwoman champion in under thirty seconds.

Iraga and Aisha (disguised as Firecat) face each other in the championship round of the tournament. Iraga's superhuman strength is revealed when she is able to break an arm bar submission hold applied by Aisha. Iraga then transforms into her werewolf state and turns to attack Gene. Aisha intercedes and transforms into her own beast form which is revealed to be a white tiger. She eventually manages to kill Iraga.

==== Hanmyo ====
Voiced by: Tomoko Kawakami (Japanese); Rebecca Forstadt (English)

"A prodigy of space combat with the use of cats."

Hanmyo (ハンミョウ, Hanmyō) is the youngest member of the Anten Seven and travels with her two cats, Kemi and Mata. She pilots an advanced ship, the Torarato, which separates into three subsections, each equipped with its own grappler and weapons. These smaller ships are controlled by her cats, who she communicates with through a mental link. She is also an expert in martial arts, as seen when Jim initially spots her training near a water fountain on Symka 5. She easily proves to be a match for the Outlaw Star on their first encounter, forcing Gene and the crew to escape and dock at the satellite station Symka 5 for repairs.

She has a brief romantic involvement with Jim (never knowing he is part of Gene's crew, and Jim never discovering that she is a Kei Pirate). After their initial meeting, Jim arranges to go on a date with her and brings her a bouquet of flowers. The two kids make plans to have a second date, but Jim is forced to leave the space station when he returns to find that the repairs to the Outlaw Star have been completed.

Hanmyo launches a second attack on the Outlaw Star but is defeated by a new combat technique devised by Jim. Her ship explodes, leaving behind one of the flowers Jim had given to her. The Outlaw Star is forced to return to Symka-5 for further repairs after the battle, and Jim is overjoyed believing he will get to see Hanmyo again. He is heartbroken when she doesn't show up for their date.

==== Hamushi ====
Voiced by: Mako Hyōdō (Japanese); Dorothy Elias-Fahn (English)

"A beauty who captivates men purely by her sex appeal." (Changed to "A beauty who captivates men purely by her good looks" on Cartoon Network)

Hamushi (ハムシ) is a female assassin of the Anten Seven who uses her sex appeal to seduce her targets before killing them. A skilled Tao magic-user, she is able to effortlessly deflect or negate several of Gene's lesser caster shells. Only when Gene uses the rare number #4 shell is she defeated: in exchange for a portion of his life energy, the shell dismantles her organic structure into a flailing mass of wiry fibers of flesh before absorbing her into a miniature black hole. The black hole has been rumored to "compress" the target of the rare caster shell (e.g.: compressed data into a saving device), this would explain why a similar caster shell could not contain Hazanko (his power produced data too large for the caster shell to contain). She appears to be the commander of Hazanko's personal ship the Geomancer.

==== Tobigera ====
Voiced by: Hikaru Midorikawa (Japanese); Michael Lindsay (English)

"A master of disguise and the tools of killing." (Changed to "A master of disguise and the tools of battle" on Cartoon Network)

Tobigera (トビゲラ) is a master of disguise. Mainly used for comic relief in the Hot Springs Planet episode, he attempts to assassinate Gene a number of times using a claw with three long blades on his right arm while dressed as a tourist, but is always thwarted by several random, yet highly comedic deus ex machina, all whilst Gene fails to realize any danger. Nevertheless, he is still the last member of the Anten Seven to be defeated, having been absorbed into the Geomancer along with Hazanko who was granted ultimate power by the Leyline in the show's final episode. After assisting Hazanko in the last grappler fight, Tobigera meets his death when a clawed arm growing from the Outlaw Star impales him through the face.

==== Jukai ====
Voiced by: Masashi Ebara (Japanese); Doug Stone (English)

"His abilities are shrouded in mystery."

Jukai (ジュウカイ, Jūkai) is presumably the oldest member of the Anten Seven. He speaks with a very raspy voice, although his face is never seen and little is known about him. He is wrapped from the neck down in a straitjacket with a spiked back, and wears a mask with a stylised number six on it. Jukai's specialty appears to be manipulation of hydrogen/oxygen particles in the air around him, as seen when he teleports Hazanko to the Leyline's gate. He attacks by turning into a giant whirlwind, appearing to be made of water, and ramming into his opponents. When defeated by Aisha at the Leyline, he deflates like a popped water-balloon, streams of liquid spurting from his many wounds. Though his arms and hands are pretty much restrained in the jacket he can still cast spells by shaking his body from side to side while chanting.

==== Hitoriga ====
Voiced by: Kiyonobu Suzuki (Japanese); Barry Stigler (English)

"A man advanced in the martial arts much like the leader of the Anten Seven."

Hitoriga (ヒトリガ) is an assassin much like Suzuka, and not much is known about his past except for the fact that he was responsible for killing Suzuka's entire family as part of a contract. A swordsman himself, when he battled Suzuka in the past he was able to defeat her, making him the only person to have ever done so in a sword-fight. Afterwards, he altered his face and body to look precisely like hers, giving him the bizarre appearance of a doppelganger, but normally wears a bag like mask with painted eyeholes and a toothy grin. He states he did this because he is in love with Suzuka and wanted to at least see her face since he knew he could never have her. When he confronted Suzuka again in the Galactic Leyline's maze, he was finally defeated by her Crimson technique, which she had devised specifically to kill him.

== Minor characters ==
=== Lord Ark Manaf ===
One of the few remaining "wizards" in the Toward Stars Galaxy, Lord Ark bears the title of "12th Head Priest". He journeyed with Lord Hadoun and Urt to the planet of Tenrei. With the galaxy's supply of the mystical power of "mana" waning, Lord Ark spends his days selling souvenirs at the temple on Tenrei's Mt. Nantai. Gene visits the temple in search of caster shells, and is met by Lord Ark who tries to sell him tchotchkes.

In exchange for acquiring nude footage of Urt, Lord Ark gives Gene a single #13 caster shell, the most powerful among all 20 shells that exist. He also provides Gene with a warning that the shells given to him by Urt, Hadoun, and himself will require a catalyst when used: draining a portion of Gene's life force after he fires them.

=== Lord Hadoun ===
An enfeebled elderly wizard who can make the #9 caster shell, the second most powerful shell behind Lord Ark's #13. Hadoun is senile and lecherous and greatly desires to see Urt naked, commenting after he does that he "can die happy."

=== Urt ===
A priestess and one of the last surviving wizards in the galaxy along with Ark and Hadoun, Urt is responsible for transforming the planet Tenrei into a tourist Mecca renowned for its many resorts based around the planet's plethora of natural hot springs.

Urt runs a women's-only retreat located at the summit of Mt. Nyotai which is concealed beneath a layer of snow. After Gene defeats her in a game of ping-pong, she gives him a gift of two #4 caster shells, the third most powerful shell in existence behind the #9 and #13. She also agrees to shoot provocative footage of herself so that Gene will be able to exchange it for the #9 and #13 shells. This proves to be a ruse, however, as she rigs the video tape to cause a massive explosion, destroying Lord Ark and Hadoun's temple on Mt. Nantai.

When Gene departs from Tenrei, Urt sits alone watching the Outlaw Star blasting off and muses, "Is this important? Will the universe be met with another disaster?"

=== Old Man/Gramps ===
An elderly outlaw bearing an eyepatch, as well as a prosthetic arm, and leg who enlists Gene and Jim to salvage a treasure buried deep within a planet made up entirely of water.

As they approach the sunken ship containing the treasure, Gramps reveals to Gene and Jim that the planet is populated by an aggressive and powerful species of primitive life forms which he refers to as, "demons". He also reveals that the demons are responsible for wiping out his entire family.

The crew of the Outlaw Star manages to salvage the treasure, which turns out to be a large store of dragonite (a rare crystalline substance that makes FTL travel possible), but is caught by the patriarch of the demons as they are attempting to escape. The creature causes severe damage to the Outlaw Star, notably tearing off the grappler arms but is destroyed when Gramps embarks on a suicide mission, piloting a mini-submarine into the creature's maw and detonating a bomb concealed in his prosthetic arm.

The money obtained from the dragonite proves to be far less than expected, and is entirely used up on repairing the ship, and paying the various other bills that have been piling up.

=== Saio Wong ===
An inmate at the notorious Gehenna Prison located on the high-gravity planet of Hecatoncheires. Wong is reputed to know the coordinates to the Galactic Leyline and Nguyen Kahn blackmails Gene into infiltrating the prison in order to obtain this information.

Although Wong is initially adversarial toward Gene, he agrees to work with him to attempt a daring jailbreak. Once successful, Wong willingly hands over the data he has on the Galactic Leyline.

=== McCoy ===
A pudgy and boorish outlaw with whom Hilda is acquainted, McCoy offers to assist Hilda as she makes her preparations with Gene to retrieve the XGP-15-A II. Hilda coldly refuses McCoy's offer, saying she's only interested in hiring people who have skill. A brief altercation ensues, with Hilda tasing McCoy and his two cohorts before they can react.

McCoy is then hired by Ron MacDougall to detain Hilda and Gene at their hotel, but is defeated a second time.

As Hilda prepares to depart Blue Heaven, McCoy and his associates make a third attempt to hinder her, and is placed under arrest by the Ctarl-Ctarl empire on the orders of Aisha Clan Clan. Aisha claims that McCoy will face execution later, but is stripped of her rank shortly thereafter for allowing Hilda to escape. Thus, McCoy's fate is ultimately unknown.

=== Rob Kane ===
AKA: Death Rob

A criminal of some renown, he claims to have killed a dozen men, a fact which does not impress Gene in the least. Kane shows up at Clyde's bar in the premiere episode seeking to kill Gene in retribution for Gene collecting the bounty on Rob's brother, Butch. With Jim's assistance, Gene easily takes down Kane and earns a 4,000 wong bounty.

=== Zomba ===
A "legendary" wanted man who dresses in the garb of a Christian preacher, and is rumored to be worth 10,000 wong. Gene tracks him down while journeying to Heifong. The two duel in the ruins of a nearby church. They initially agree to fight with edged weapons, but Gene guns down Zomba after he is revealed to be a cyborg.

Zomba's dying words are, "Not very sportsman-like," to which Gene replies, "Sorry about that, but I never hold myself back when fighting cyborgs."

Gene only manages to collect a 2,000 wong bounty due to the fact that he didn't kill the real Zomba, but rather a cyborg clone. It is then revealed that Suzuka killed the real Zomba and collected the 10,000 wong bounty. She later uses the reward money to bet on the Outlaw Star during the Heifong space race, but loses when the ship comes in 4th place.

=== Maiden of the Leyline ===
Melfina's alternate personality, she becomes activated only when connected to the Galactic Leyline and the phrase, "Leyline Project Command: It was you who broke my mason plate," is uttered. This suspends Melfina's normal personality and makes her the liaison through which people can interact with the Leyline and have their wishes granted.

At the conclusion of the series, the Maiden of the Leyline is separated from Melfina's normal personality, informing her that the Leyline will be moved to a new location, and the part of Melfina that was connected to the Leyline will move along with it, leaving Melfina on her own, and able to simply be herself for the first time.

=== Horace ===
The name of Hilda's ship as well as the ship's integrated AI personality. Horace has a laconic and monotone delivery which sometimes serves as a dry sense of humor. When Gene comments that he might puke all over the weapons console, Horace intones, "Warning: that may cause a short-circuit."

Horace is destroyed at Farfalas when the ship is unable to break free of the star's gravity well. When Hilda informs it that she must abandon ship, Horace's final words to her are, "I understand. Good-bye, Hilda."

=== Crackerjack ===
A professional thief and terrorist who ensnares the crew of the Outlaw Star as part of a scheme to rob a high-end jewelry store.

In a plot reminiscent of Die Hard Crackerjack poses as a left-wing militant demanding independence for Heifong in order to misdirect the authorities from his true purpose: a smash-and-grab robbery operation.

With the help of Aisha and Suzuka, Gene manages to figure out Crackerjack's true intentions and thwart his plan just as he is making his escape.

=== Valyria ===
An intelligence officer who works for a private security force known as Angel Links, which patrols areas on the frontier of space. She comes across the Outlaw Star just outside of Heifong after Gene has just defeated a pirate ship and is preparing to loot its weapons and cargo.

Mistaking the Outlaw Star for a pirate ship, she places Gene and his crew under temporary arrest pending an investigation.

When the space force's security ship falls victim to a Trojan Horse attack, Gene and his fiends seize the opportunity to escape in the Outlaw Star. However, Gene decides to aid Valyria and her crew in fighting off the attackers, for which he receives a case of dragonite, and is allowed to depart peacefully. Valyria also reveals to Gene that she discovered his ship is actually the XGP-15-A II, and that it has a counterfeit registration. At Douze's insistence, she agrees to look the other way.

Valyria appears only briefly in the spinoff Angel Links series.

=== Douze ===
A product of genetic engineering, Douze is a very large, intimidating, and prideful dinosaur-humanoid hybrid who serves as a counter-terrorism expert for the private security forces. He believes in strict adherence to the law and views outlaws as nothing more than common criminals.

He gets into a physical altercation with Gene when Gene accuses him of being a "fascist lizard-man." However, when Gene finds Douze pinned down beneath a collapsed portion of ceiling, Gene insists on freeing him, proving Douze's prejudices regarding outlaws wrong.

In return, Douze convinces Valyria to ignore the fact that they discovered Gene's ship had a phony registration and is, in fact, the XGP-15-A II.

=== Reiko Ando ===
Voiced by: Yuriko Yamaguchi (Japanese); Mary Elizabeth McGlynn (English)

Fred Luo's betrothed, Reiko is the reigning champion of the Strongest Woman in the Universe competition for 4-years running. Believing the feat to be impossible, Fred told Reiko that she must win the tournament 5 times in a row before he will consent to marry her. As Reiko prepares to go for a 5th consecutive win, Fred fears no one can beat her and enlists Gene to help him in exchange for a large sum of cash. Fred also agrees to loan Gene more money in exchange for simply taking the job.

Gene initially plans to have Aisha enter the tournament and win, only to find that the Ctarl Ctarl are banned from participating due to an incident five years previous where a Ctarl Ctarl competitor became enraged and killed nearly a thousand spectators.

Gene is persuaded to enter the tournament himself (dressed in drag) under the name, "Jenny Starwind" and is matched up against Reiko in the very first round. Realizing that he cannot compete with her directly, Gene attempts to wear Reiko down through a combination of psychological taunts and dodging her attacks. However, Reiko catches him and delivers a German Suplex knocking Gene out cold and winning the match in less than a minute.

Reiko is eventually defeated in the semi-finals by Iraga, a member of the Anten Seven who is tasked with killing Gene.

Reiko encounters Fred as he is departing from the arena and Fred, with mock disappointment, says that he has nothing to say to her. Reiko vows to train harder than ever and embark upon a fresh attempt to win 5 tournaments in a row. Fred agrees to these terms, and is rewarded with a bone-crushing embrace that sends him to the hospital.
