= Outlaw Star =

Japanese anime television series

- First tankōbon volume cover, featuring Gene Starwind

星方武侠アウトロースター (Seihō Bukyō Autorō Sutā)
- Genre: Adventure; Space opera; Space Western
- Created by: Hajime Yatate, Takehiko Itō
- Manga
- Written by: Takehiko Itō
- Published by: Shueisha
- Magazine: Ultra Jump
- Original run: September 20, 1996 – May 20, 1999
- Volumes: 3
- Anime television series
- Directed by: Mitsuru Hongo
- Produced by: Shinjirō Yokoyama; Naotake Furusato
- Written by: Katsuhiko Chiba
- Music by: Kow Otani
- Studio: Sunrise
- Licensed by: Crunchyroll: BI: Anime Limited
- Original network: TV Tokyo
- English network: BI: CNX; PH: GMA Network; US: Cartoon Network/Adult Swim (Toonami)
- Original run: January 8, 1998 – June 25, 1998
- Episodes: 26
- Light novel

Outlaw Star Ginga no Ryuu Myaku Hen
- Written by: Tiba Katsuhiko
- Illustrated by: Saitou Takuya
- Published by: Shueisha
- Imprint: Super Dash Bunko
- Original run: October 1998 – February 1999
- Volumes: 2
- Light novel

Unkai no El Dorado Seihō Bukyō Outlaw Star
- Written by: Miho Sakai
- Illustrated by: Saitou Takuya
- Published by: Shueisha
- Imprint: Super Dash Bunko
- Published: July 14, 2000
- Spin-off
- Angel Links
- icon

Outlaw Star (星方武侠アウトロースター, Seihō Bukyō Autorō Sutā; lit. 'Starward Warrior Knight Outlaw Star') is a Japanese media mix primarily consisting of an anime television series produced by Sunrise and a corresponding manga series written and illustrated by Takehiko Itō. The series takes place in the "Toward Stars Era" universe in which spacecraft are capable of traveling faster than the speed of light. The plot follows protagonist Gene Starwind and his motley crew of an inherited ship dubbed the Outlaw Star, as they search for a legendary outer space treasure trove called the "Galactic Leyline".

Planned by Sunrise (under the Hajime Yatate pseudonym) and Itō, Outlaw Star first appeared as a manga originally serialized in Shueisha's monthly seinen manga magazine Ultra Jump between 1996 and 1999 for a total of 21 chapters. Three volumes of collected chapters were published in Japan between August 1997 and January 1999. Although no official English version of the manga exists, it has been published in Chinese, German, Italian, and Spanish. Sunrise produced a 26-episode anime adaptation that was directed by Mitsuru Hongo and aired on the Japanese station TV Tokyo in early 1998. The animated series has since been translated and broadcast worldwide. This includes an English version from Bandai Entertainment that received an edited airing on the North American Cartoon Network blocks Toonami in early 2001 and later on Adult Swim in early 2002. Outlaw Star has been licensed for release in Australia and New Zealand by Madman Entertainment and in Europe by Beez Entertainment. A few Japanese-exclusive audio CDs and light novels have been spawned since the start of the manga's publication.

Critical reception for Outlaw Star has been mostly positive. Many reviewers praised the anime series, particularly its animation style and its balance of dramatic and comedic elements. However, some found fault with the show's pacing, believing that the storyline quality begins to wane after the first few episodes. Sunrise produced a spin-off television series titled Angel Links (星方天使エンジェルリンクス, Seihō Tenshi Enjeru Rinkusu; lit. 'Starward Angels Angel Links'), which aired in Japan in 1999. Preliminary plans were made to create a direct sequel in the form of a single-episode (OVA) called Sword of Wind, but production never began.

== Plot ==
Outlaw Star is a space opera/space Western set in the fictional "Towards Stars Era" (到星歴, Tōseireki) universe. During its past, an asteroid containing a material known as "dragonite" crashed in the fictional Arashon desert of northern China. Scientists found that the dragonite contained properties related to "ether", an energy source that would allow spacecraft to travel faster than the speed of light, and thus traverse large distances of the universe in a short time. As new colonies were formed throughout the vast reaches of outer space, pirates, assassins, and outlaws began to threaten humanity's new frontier. To create order, the Earth Federation established four empires: USSA, Einhorn, Piotr, and Tenpa. However, internal power struggles within the factions and conflicts amongst one another become abundant, leading to inevitable lawlessness. The storyline starts shortly after an infamous outlaw named "Hot Ice" Hilda flees from the Kei Pirates, a branch of the Tenpa. Hilda has stolen from them a highly-advanced prototype ship dubbed the XGP15A-II and a suitcase containing a bio-android called Melfina, the only being capable of interfacing with the ship.

Outlaw Star opens on the backwater planet Sentinel III, on which the protagonist Gene Starwind and his 11-year-old business associate and best friend James "Jim" Hawking run a small jack-of-all-trades business. After the two take a job as bodyguards for a disguised Hilda and engage in a brief skirmish with the Kei Pirates, Gene and Jim find themselves the owners of the XGP15A-II (which they nickname the "Outlaw Star") and the caretakers of Melfina, though Hilda is killed in the process. Hilda reveals that the ship's true purpose is to locate the "Galactic Leyline" (銀河の龍脈, Ginga no Ryū Myaku; lit. 'Galactic Dragon Vein'), a place which popular claims say is a holder of immense treasure, knowledge, and power. Throughout the course of the series, the crew grows to include the kimono-garbed contract killer "Twilight" Suzuka and the Ctarl-Ctarl alien catgirl Aisha Clanclan.

The Outlaw Star manga series and animated television series are paced differently. The anime episodes often involve Gene and his comrades taking on various jobs or missions to fund their ship's massive maintenance costs. Throughout their travels, the crew often encounters Ronald MacDougall and Harry MacDougall, a pair of bounty hunters responsible for the death of Gene's father. Ronald acts as a rival to Gene, while Harry wishes to form a bond with Melfina, a bio-android like himself, who instead develops strong feelings for Gene. The crew also contends with others that learn of the Outlaw Star's connection to the Galactic Leyline. They are Nguyen Khan, a scientist wishing to gain omniscience through the Leyline; and Lord Hazanko, the leader of the ruthless assassin organization the Anten Seven that seek the Leyline to gain ultimate power. The series climaxes when all parties meet on the physical plane of the Leyline. In the end, Ron MacDougall retreats, saved by a computer copy of his brother Harry (who is killed trying to protect Melfina from Hazanko), Khan is integrated into the Leyline as data, Gene reveals to Melfina that he is in love with her and frees her from the Leyline by making it their shared wish to be together forever, and Hazanko is eventually defeated by the Outlaw Star crewmembers. Once the conflict comes to a close, Gene and his friends return to Sentinel III and go their separate ways, but ultimately reunite to continue their adventures together.

== Production ==
Outlaw Star was created by Morning Star Studio. Takehiko Itō was the manga's director, writer, and chief artist. Itō was aided in his duties by Hajime Yatate, a pseudonym of writers at Sunrise. Others who contributed to the work include producer Kenzoh Tomita; starship designer Shōji Kawamori; character concept and imageboard illustrators Yutaka Minowa and Hajime Jinguji; and a team of production designers and assistant artists. Outlaw Star takes place in the Toward Stars Era, the same universe as Itō's Uchuu Eiyuu Monogatari (宇宙英雄物語, lit. 'Space Hero Story'), a pulp-science fiction manga that was first serialized by Kadokawa Shoten in 1988. Itō has described this earlier work as "something out of boy's dream" and took a much more mature, scientific approach when writing Outlaw Star. The author also referenced aspects of Chinese culture when creating Outlaw Star.

The animated television series of Outlaw Star was produced by Sunrise and directed by Mitsuru Hongo, whose previous credits include the comedy Crayon Shin-chan and the magical girl series Shamanic Princess. The script was chiefly written by Katsuhiko Chiba, who wrote about three-quarters of the episodes. Character designs were handled by Hiroyuki Hataike (Detonator Orgun, Armored Trooper Votoms) and Takuya Saito. The show's vehicles were designed by Juniya Ishigaki and Macross and Gundam mecha artist Shōji Kawamori, the latter of whom designed the Outlaw Star ship itself. Kow Otani composed the musical score for the Outlaw Star anime. The series features the opening theme "Through the Night" written and performed Masahiko Arimachi, and two closing themes, "Hiru no Tsuki" (昼の月; lit. 'Daytime Moon') and "Tsuki no Ie" (月の家; lit. 'House of the Moon'), both written and performed by Akino Arai. "Through the Night" was chosen for the opening among several candidate songs. Itō and Sunrise agreed that the theme should be one that had not been used in a recent animation and that it should feature male vocals. Arimachi wrote the song to resemble a story, took into account its long-term impact, and felt it fit Outlaw Star perfectly.

== Media ==
=== Manga ===
Outlaw Star was serialized in Japan's monthly Shueisha magazine Ultra Jump between 1996 and 1999. A total of 21 chapters were published, and 17 of these chapters were compiled among three tankōbon (collected volumes), released in Japan from August 1997 to January 1999. Each volume also contains information on the series' universe; detailed spaceship and planet descriptions; and character profiles. A Chinese version of the manga was published in Hong Kong by Sharp Point Press. The series has also been published in German and Italian by Planet Manga. No official English translation of the Outlaw Star exists, though Morning Star Studio's official website suggests that a release in the United States was planned at one time.

=== Anime ===
Outlaw Star was edited by Cartoon Network (bottom) to cover up instances of nudity featured in the Japanese version (top).

The 26-episode anime adaptation of Outlaw Star began broadcasting in Japan on TV Tokyo from January 8, 1998, and ended on June 25, 1998, though the broadcast began on January 9, as it was in a 1:15 A.M. time slot. The series was licensed by Bandai Entertainment. The English version was produced by ZRO Limit Productions and was aired on the evening Toonami block beginning on January 15, 2001 and ended on February 21, 2001. This broadcast of the show was heavily edited due to its adult content. Profanity was removed, scenes with violence and lewd behavior were cut or toned down, and many scenes containing nudity were altered by digitally inserting clothing onto characters. Episode 23, in which the Outlaw Star crew visits a hot spring planet, was not aired due to nudity and suggestive themes. However, some instances of adult language were not removed for the anime's initial run. Toonami's creative director Sean Akins claimed that Cartoon Network made all of their own edits to their licensed properties during this time period, which they did "in a way that preserves the story". The role of Fred Luo, a recurring homosexual character, was considerably toned down. Cartoon Network had no specific editing policy with regard to gay characters, but that "overt sexuality or implied sexuality of any kind are not allowed". Outlaw Star was also aired on the late night Adult Swim block throughout 2002. However, the broadcast was cancelled late in the year and (according to Akins) the network allowed its rights to the anime to expire by 2003. Outlaw Star was aired in the United Kingdom on CNX in October 2002.

Bandai released the first 13 episodes of Outlaw Star on DVD in Japan on August 25, 1999, and the remaining 13 episodes on November 25, 1999. A Japanese "remastered" DVD boxset containing the entire series was published by Bandai on September 22, 2006. Yet another DVD boxset, Emotion the Best: Seihō Bukyō Outlaw Star, was released in Japan on September 24, 2010. Bandai released the series uncut in North America in three DVD collections on September 1, 2000, February 14, 2001, and March 6, 2001. The Outlaw Star Perfect Collection Box Set, a DVD compilation of the entire series, was released on September 10, 2002. The series was again re-released on March 28, 2006, as the Outlaw Star Complete Collection. Outlaw Star additionally received DVD releases in Australia and New Zealand by Madman Entertainment on June 23, 2004, and in the United Kingdom by Beez Entertainment on April 25, 2011. Following the closure of Beez, the show was re-licensed by Anime Limited who would re-release the series in 2013. At Otakon 2013, Funimation (later Crunchyroll, LLC) and Sunrise had announced that they have rescued Outlaw Star, along with a handful of other former BEI titles. In October 2014, the entire series was released in Japan for the first time on Blu-Ray, with the set including such features as staff commentary, an art gallery board, book breaks of Gene and Melfina, and various songs.

On March 16, 2017, Funimation announced that Outlaw Star would be released in North America in both standard and Collector's Editions on June 13, 2017. Each edition includes a DVD and Blu-ray copy of the series, while the Collector's Edition comes in a metallic chipboard artbox designed after the XGP-15A2 and includes a 100-page artbook. Following Funimation's acquisition of the series, it aired again on Cartoon Network as part of Adult Swim on the Toonami programming block starting on August 20, 2017, and concluding on March 18, 2018. Due to its late night broadcast on Adult Swim, the anime was aired with fewer edits and included the U.S. television premiere of episode 23.

=== CDs ===
The opening theme and the two closing themes of Outlaw Star were published in Japan in 1998 as CD singles by Victor Entertainment and JVC respectively. Victor Entertainment published a two-volume original soundtrack for the series on March 31, 1998, and June 24, 1998. The CDs consist of a total of 61 background and vocal music tracks. Another two-disc album containing several drama tracks, Seihō Bukyō Outlaw Star Sound & Scenario Tracks (星方武侠アウトロースター サウンド&シナリオトラック), was released on August 21, 1998.

=== Light novels ===
A series of light novels based on Outlaw Star has been released in Japan by Shueisha under its Super Dash Bunko label. Outlaw Star Ginga no Ryū Myaku Hen (OUTLAW STAR 銀河の龍脈編; lit. 'Outlaw Star: Chapter of the Galactic Dragon Vein'), was written by Katsuhiko Tiba (千葉 克彦 Chiba Katsuhiko), illustrated by Takuya Saitou (斎藤 卓也 Saitō Takuya), and released in two volumes in October 1998 and February 1999. The two books are an adaptation of the anime series, retelling the early events that trigger Gene and company's search for the Galactic Leyline. Another light novel, Unkai no El Dorado Seihō Bukyō Outlaw Star (雲海のエルドラド 星方武侠アウトロースター; lit. 'El Dorado Covered With Clouds: Starward Warrior Knight Outlaw Star'), was written by Miho Sakai, illustrated by Takuya Saitou, and released as a single volume on July 14, 2000. The novel features an original plot involving the Outlaw Star crew pursuing a serial killer named Billy McAglen in a mining town called El Dorado.

=== Other merchandise ===
A hardcover guidebook titled Muhōmono no Kioku – Seihō Bukyō Outlaw Star (無法者の記録―星方武侠アウトロースター; lit. 'Outlaw Record – Starward Warrior Knight Outlaw Star') was published by Fujimi Shobo as part of its Dragon Magazine imprint in November 1998. The guide contains summaries of the manga and anime, character profiles, sketches, animation cels, and interviews with the production staff. In 2001, Bandai released an Outlaw Star action figure set as part of a line based on its licensed anime franchises. The set contains the Outlaw Star ship and the characters Gene and Melfina. Asako Nishida, one of the show's animation directors, compiled her contributions to the Toward Stars Era franchise in a 2009 art book.

== Reception ==
Critical reception for Outlaw Star has been favorable. Eric Luce, Ivevei Upatkoon, and Michael Poirier of EX.org all gave similarly positive reviews for the Japanese manga, Japanese anime, and English anime versions of Outlaw Star respectively. Luce was complimentary of the manga's "raw" yet "good and distinctive" artwork, detailed backgrounds, and good placement of characters among one another. However, he was annoyed that all the women have a "disturbing tendency to all have the same silicone stiffened chests" and that characters typically wear mad grins. Upatkoon found the artwork of the anime version to be good, and he particularly enjoyed the opening sequence, but took issue with the occasionally inconsistent character designs. He also appreciated the show's dichotomy between serious and humorous subject matter, shown by the titular ship in its grappler mode and how it communicates with the crew. Poirier found the main protagonist Gene to be the anime's best characterization: "Gene Starwind is a sly, sharp-shooting hero whose success with his gun (and with the ladies) is matched only by his propensity to get space-sick. Imagine that: the star of a space-faring series has to continually worry about vomiting onto his control panel. This sort of ironic comedy can be found throughout Outlaw Star, creating excellent segues between the fantastic action sequences and the delightful characters." Poirier was intrigued by its other characters as well, and was impressed by the "sharp but fluid" animation style and the spaceship designs. Mania.com's David Owens appreciated the artistic style specifically for the characters, nearly all of which he incidentally found likeable. Jacob Churosh of THEM Anime Reviews additionally noted high animation quality throughout. Although he proclaimed the vehicle designs of Outlaw Star to be superb, Protoculture Addicts writer Martin Ouellette judged the animation and character designs to be "less lucky" and lacking in "the special aura" of Sunrise's acclaimed 1998 series Cowboy Bebop. Jonathan Clements and Helen McCarthy, authors of The Anime Encyclopedia agreeably denoted Outlaw Star as "no competition for Cowboy Bebop in terms of style, content, or execution".

Critical reception for the plot of Outlaw Star has been mixed. Churosh found that though the series features many clichés of 1990's science fiction anime, Outlaw Star manages to transcend them as well. "Maybe it doesn't go anywhere that other series haven't already been", the reviewer stated. "But boy, does it have a damn good time getting there." Upatkoon observed that the plot "[takes] off with a bang at the beginning" and then begins to drag. Keith Dawe of Animerica also noted this about the anime's pacing, stating that even as the first few episodes do well to begin the narrative, the show's writers rely too heavily on inertia to advance it. He went on to remark that the series suffers from "unfocused scripting" and that "one has to endure the occasional cheesy episode to reap the rewards of a show that is clever, pragmatic and amusing". However, Dawe did regard the English script writing and voice acting, and called the over-the-top introductory narration for each episode a reminder that the show should be enjoyed for what it was. Owens commented that the plot will not seem very original, but that it does seem to have direction, despite said direction not being very clear.

Outlaw Star has received very modest commercial success and miscellaneous viewer recognition. The initial shipment of the manga's first volume sold out nationwide in Japan. According to Morning Star Studio's English website, the Outlaw Star manga has sold 250,000 copies, though the anime series was less successful. The Outlaw Star television series was aired in Japan during a late night timeslot because it was not likely to obtain more than one or two percent viewership like prime time shows. Outlaw Star was voted as the 20th best anime of 1999 in the Japanese Animage Anime Grand Prix. During a summer 2001 online poll to determine which show would return to Toonami, Outlaw Star received approximately two-thirds of the more than 150,000 votes cast. In August 2002, Cartoon Network announced that the late-night Adult Swim Outlaw Star received a Nielsen rating of 0.9, up 125 percent for that same time slot and a delivery of 414,000, up 135 percent for the 18–34 age range. The Outlaw Star Complete Collection was the 21st best-selling anime DVD in the United States in 2006 and the 25th in 2007. In 2012, Bandai's North American division, Bandai Entertainment, listed Outlaw Star as one of its top five most successful anime properties. Josh Pool of IGN listed Outlaw Star at number six on its "Top Ten Anime Themes and Soundtracks of All-Time", noting a stark polarity between the opening and ending themes.

== Legacy ==
In 1999, Sunrise produced a spin-off television series titled Angel Links (星方天使エンジェルリンクス, Seihō Tenshi Enjeru Rinkusu; lit. 'Angels of the Stars: Angel Links'). Outlaw Star and Angel Links take place in the same universe; characters from both series appeared in an episode of Outlaw Star, but the two have little else in relation. Morning Star Studio also drafted a proposed sequel to Outlaw Star in the form of a single-episode OVA special titled Outlaw Star 2: Sword of Wind on its official website with character designs and a plot outline. Set three years after the events of Outlaw Star, it was to continue the adventures of Gene Starwind in his new starship named "Sword of Wind". Due to the lack of the franchise's popularity in Japan and the busy schedule of animation director Mitsuru Hongo, no production date was set. In October 2001, Takehiko Itō commented that his team only had static, preliminary plans for the sequel series and that they could perhaps continue the manga series in the future.
