= Takehiko Itō =

Japanese manga artist

- 伊東岳彦
- Born: Kitami, Hokkaido, Japan
- Other name: Hiroyuki Hataike
- Occupation: Manga artist
- Known for: Outlaw Star; Lord of Lords: Ryu Knight

Takehiko Itō (伊東 岳彦, Itō Takehiko) is a Japanese manga artist best known for his work on the manga Outlaw Star from his affiliated Morning Star Studio. He was also the primary creative mind behind other works of fiction set in the Toward Stars universe including the Uchuu Eiyuu Monogatari manga and Angel Links anime series.

== Career ==
Before founding Morning Star Studio in his late 20s, Itō studied planning and editing at the design office Shindosha. He began work as a manga editor, but found the job dull and began drawing manga himself. Some of his earliest works, including Good Morning Althea (グッドモーニング アルテア), were created under the pen name "Black Point". Many of Itō's animation works are credited to the name Hiroyuki Hataike (幡池裕行, Hataike Hiroyuki). Under this name he designed a transforming toy that would later become Unicron.

Itō's science fiction manga Uchuu Eiyuu Monogatari (宇宙英雄物語; lit. 'Future-Retro Hero Story') started serialization in the monthly Kadokawa Shoten magazine Comic Comp in 1988 with five tankōbon (collected volume) releases between 1989 and 1991. During that time, Itō came up with initial concept of the anime television franchise NG Knight Lamune & 40. His next major manga series, Haō Taikei Ryū Knight (覇王大系リューナイト; lit. 'Lord of Lords: Ryu Knight'), was serialized in the Shueisha magazine V Jump beginning in 1993. Three tankōbon were published between 1994 and 1995. Uchuu Eiyuu Monogatari was shortly thereafter picked up by Shueisha and was published in a total of eight volumes throughout 1996. He is also known as the creator of Outlaw Star (星方武侠アウトロースター, Seihō Bukyō Autorō Sutā; lit. 'Starward Warrior Knight Outlaw Star'), a manga and anime television series set within the "Toward Stars Era" universe of Uchuu Eiyuu Monogatari.

Itō was eventually offered a job at Marvel Comics, but he was unsure he would be able to fit it into his schedule. However, Itō joined Marvel after talking with C.B. Cebulski in 2002.

== Works ==
=== Manga ===
- Good Morning Althea (1986, serialized in C-Live)
- Uchuu Eiyuu Monogatari (1988–1992, serialized in Comic Comp; 1995–1996, serialized in Ultra Jump)
- Haō Taikei Ryū Knight (1994–1995, serialized in V Jump)
- Outlaw Star (1996–1999, serialized in Ultra Jump)
- K.O. Seiki Beast Sanjushi Gaiden: Birth of the V-Bi-DARN (1999, published by Kadokawa Shoten)
- Ohma ni Doki Doki! (2002, published by Kadokawa Shoten)

=== Anime ===
- Good Morning Althea (1987, original creator)
- Gunbuster (1988, set designer)
- New Story of Aura Battler Dunbine (1988, character designer)
- Patlabor: The Movie (1989, mechanical designer)
- Assemble Insert (1989–1990, guest character designer)
- NG Knight Ramune & 40 (1990–1991, original creator)
- Detonator Orgun (1991–1992, mechanical designer)
- K.O. Beast (1992–1993, character designer)
- D-1 Devastator (1992, mechanical designer)
- Haō Taikei Ryū Knight (1994–1995, original creator)
- The Vision of Escaflowne (1996, design assistant)
- Agent Aika (1997, guest character designer)
- Outlaw Star (1998, original creator)
- Angel Links (1999, character designer)
- Zegapain (2006, original creator)
- Yu-Gi-Oh! 5D's (2008–2011, design assistant, episodes 1-26 + special 1)

=== Video games ===
- Galaxy Fraulein Yuna (1992, art designer)
- Alisia Dragoon (1992, character designer)
- Thousand Arms (1998, character designer)
- SF Adventure Zero One SP (2004, character designer)
- Zwei Worter (2007, art designer)

=== Book illustrations ===
- Ao no Kishi Beruzeruga Monogatari
- Hijiri El Crusaders Saint
- Nangoku Sentai Shureio
- Uchuu Goukai Daizappa
- Watashino Yuusha Sama
- Avenir Wosagashite
- Wolf Zone
- A Kun (17) no Sensou
- Hijiri Koku 1092
- Famikon Hisshoubon
- Sword World RPG Replay Part 2
