= Animefringe =

Online anime and manga magazine

Animefringe: Online Anime Magazine (also, sometimes referred to as Anime Fringe) was a free, independent English-language online anime and manga webzine aimed at the anime and manga fandom, published monthly from 2000 to 2005 in the United States. It featured issues featuring news, reviews, interviews, features, editorials, polls, and other content related to anime, manga, Japanese pop culture, and related media.

The magazine was active for 6 years (from 2000 to 2005), and published 72 monthly issues in six yearly volumes. Its editor-in-chief was Adam Arnold.

The magazine had the ISSN 1705-3692.

Alongside websites like Anime News Network, Animefringe was one of the first English-language platforms that begun reviewing anime.
