= Hirokazu Hisayuki =

Japanese animation director

- 久行 宏和
- Born: January 31, 1967 (age 59); Tokuyama, Yamaguchi, Japan
- Occupations: Character designer, animation director
- Notable work: Brave, Queen's Blade, My-Hime, My-Otome

Hirokazu Hisayuki (久行 宏和, Hisayuki Hirokazu) is a Japanese character designer and animation director for Sunrise. His major works include the Queen's Blade game series (which was later made into an anime adaptation), the My-Hime and My-Otome series, and numerous titles from the Brave mecha series.

== Filmography ==
Year	Series	Crew role	Notes	Source
1990	Brave Exkaiser			
1991	The Brave Fighter of Sun Fighbird	Animation Director (Nakamura Pro; ep 47), Key Animation (Nakamura Pro; eps 24, 29, 47–48)		
1992	The Brave Fighter of Legend Da-Garn	Animation Director (Mecha; Nakamura Pro; Nakamura Pro; eps 5, 10, 16, 21, 25, 29, 34, 39), Key Animation (Nakamura Pro; eps 5, 10, 16, 21, 25, 29, 34)		
1993	The Brave Express Might Gaine	Animation Director (Nakamura Pro; eps 3, 9, 14, 25, 31, 36, 41, 47), Key Animation (Nakamura Pro; eps 9, 14, 19, 25, 31, 36, 41, 47)		
1994	Brave Police J-Decker	Animation Director (Nakamura Pro; Nakamura Pro & Chara; eps 5, 10, 15, 21, 27, 31, 37, 42, 47), Guest Character Design (eps 14–15, 21, 31, 37, 42), Key Animation (Nakamura Pro; eps 5, 10, 15, 21, 23, 27, 31, 37, 42, 47), Opening Animation		
1996	Future GPX Cyber Formula Saga	Character Design, Chief Animation Director		
1998	Future GPX Cyber Formula SIN	Character Design, Chief Animation Director		
2000	Gear Fighter Dendoh	Character Design		
2001	Crush Gear Turbo	Animation director		
2004	My-HiME	Character Design, Animation Director		
2005	My-Otome	Character Design, Animation Director		
2006	My-Otome Zwei	Character Design, Animation Director		
2008	My-Otome 0~S.ifr~	Director, Character Design		
2010	Armored Trooper Votoms: Case Irvine	Character Design, Animation Director, Mechanical design		
2012	Battle Spirits: Sword Eyes	Storyboard director		

=== Video games ===
Year	Series	Crew role	Notes	Source
1998	Brave Saga	Character design		
2008	Soulcalibur IV	Character design for Kamikirimusi		
2015	Xuccess Heaven	Animation Director, Character designer		

== Other works ==
- Queen's Blade game books – Character design
- Queen's Blade Perfect Visual Collection (art book) – Character art (contributor)
