= List of My-Otome episodes =

This article is a list of episodes produced for the My-Otome anime series, the second season of the My-HiME anime series. The series has twenty six main episodes, nine omake episodes, and a four-part OVA series. The television series aired on TV Tokyo from October 6, 2005, to March 30, 2006. Although billed as the second season of My-HiME, it takes place in a new setting with different main characters. Most My-HiME characters make reappeances in different roles. The episodes were later released on nine DVDs. Like My-HiME, My-Otome also has omake included with each DVD release that provide supplementary information about the show. Unlike the My-HiME omake, the My-Otome omake are fully animated, with some material taken from the TV episodes and some new animated content. There are nine omake episodes, one on each DVD. My-Otome Zwei is a four-part OVA series set a year after the series. A prequel to My-Otome entitled My-Otome 0: S.ifr is also released. The first episode was released on February 22, 2008.

== TV episodes ==
No.	Title	Original release date
1	"Dreamy ☆ Arika"; Transliteration: "Yume no ☆ Arika" (Japanese: ユメノ☆アリカ)	October 6, 2005
Young Arika Yumemiya travels to the Kingdom of Windbloom in search of her mother and in order to become an Otome. She soon becomes acquainted with Garderobe student Nina, Nina's foster father Sergay, and the rebellious princess Mashiro. A monster known as a Slave attacks Arika, Nina and Mashiro, but Meister Otome Shizuru Viola easily defeats it, impressing Arika and inspiring her to become an Otome.
2	"A Gust Running Through the Garden of Otome"; Transliteration: "Otome no Sono o Kakeru Shippū!?" (Japanese: 乙女の園を駆ける疾風!?)	October 13, 2005
Deeply impressed after witnessing Shizuru's power, Arika is more determined than ever to become a real Otome and attend the school of Garderobe. Sneaking out of the infirmary and evading the students pursuing her, she reaches the room where the council is discussing the previous incident and Nina's punishment, and declares her intent to join.
3	"First T-i-m-e"; Transliteration: "Hajimete no Ke-i-ke-n" (Japanese: はじめてのケ·イ·ケ·ン)	October 20, 2005
In order to acquire permission to attend the Otome school of Garderobe, inexperienced Arika must face Nina in an exhibition battle during the coronation ceremony of Mashiro, knowing that if Nina loses, she will be expelled. Nina gains the upper hand in the match, but a mysterious knight attacks during the ceremony, and Arika catches a falling airplane, holding it long enough for Brigadier General Haruka Armitage, a Meister Otome, to throw it to safety.
4	"The Blazing Transfer Student!!"; Transliteration: "Honō no Tennyūsei!!" (Japanese: 炎の転入生!!)	October 27, 2005
After a safe conclusion to the crisis of the previous episode, Arika is admitted to Garderobe and receives some important lessons on the way. She earns some new friends as well as some new enemies.
5	"The Academy, the Uniform and Me ♪"; Transliteration: "Gakuen to Seifuku to Atashi ♪" (Japanese: 学園と制服とあたし♪)	November 3, 2005
Arika's studentship is put in jeopardy when her uniform appears in a store, as she is in need of money to attend. To prove that she did not sell the uniform, Arika places her trust in her new friends to uncover the true culprit, and leads appear to point to Mashiro's cat Mikoto. Unbeknownst to her, a fellow student stole the uniform in order to try to sabotage her. Meanwhile, an unknown individual who knew Arika's mother starts sending her money and letters.
6	"Nina Entangled... orz" Transliteration: "Nina, Makareru... orz" (Japanese: ニナ、まかれる...orz)	November 10, 2005
Upperclassman Shiho's jealousy towards Nina reaches catastrophic heights, as she decides to sabotage the school's swimming pool during sports class by planting a Gelle Anguille in it. After Nina almost drowns, they try to use salt to expose it, but because someone switched the labels of salt and sugar, they end up increasing its size. Pearl student Juliet Nao Zhang intervenes, and shortly thereafter, Arika becomes her room attendant alongside Nina.
7	"The Blue Dance/Oath of the Maiden"; Transliteration: "Ao no Mai / Otome no Chigiri" (Japanese: 蒼の舞/乙女の契り)	November 17, 2005
While helping with the reconstruction of the royal palace, Arika hears a rumor about Mashiro. Arika and Mashiro find a mysterious machine beneath the castle, which shatters Arika's Coral GEM. When a Slave attacks, Arika and Mashiro make a contract, and Arika manages to defeat the Slave with the Blue Sky Sapphire's power.
8	"Burden of Destiny"; Transliteration: "Unmei no Kubiki" (Japanese: 運命の軛)	November 24, 2005
Arika is now responsible for finding a way to cancel her contract, while keeping it secret. In order to learn more, Arika and her friends break into the Mausoleum of Garderobe. They learn that Otomes are loyal to their masters above all else, even if they must fight their friends. Arika, however, resolves to find a way to change it.
9	"The Ocean - Swimsuit + Disaster = ?"; Transliteration: "Umi − Mizugi + Sōnan = ?" (Japanese: 海ー水着+遭難=?)	December 1, 2005
As a part of the Otome training, Arika's Coral class begins a 100 km hiking trip through Aries. With randomly chosen pairs, the students enter into wilderness, when things start to go wrong for Arika and her partner Erstin. A snake bites Erstin, the nanomachines within her fail, and the bracelets used to call for help break down. A mysterious figure attacks Arika.
10	"A Serious Otome Matter"; Transliteration: "Sore ga Otome no Ichdaiji" (Japanese: それが乙女の一大事)	December 8, 2005
Garderobe, Aries, Windbloom, and Artai move to rescue the two lost Coral students, as a mysterious group, Aswad, moves through the area.
11	"HAPPY ☆ BIRTHDAY" (Japanese: HAPPY ☆ BIRTHDAY)	December 15, 2005
Nina and Arika are sent to escort Mashiro to a meeting with royal guests from a neighbouring country. To avoid an international conflict when Mashiro runs away, Windbloom comes up with a hasty substitute.
12	"Masquerade?"; Transliteration: "Kamen Butō kai?" (Japanese: 仮面舞踏かい?)	December 22, 2005
Arika impersonates the missing Mashiro and meets the foreign prince Takumi, while Nina pretends to be Arika. Meanwhile, Mashiro takes the name of Nina and ends up in the slums of Windbloom, where she meets a foreign boy, who turns out to be the real prince Takumi, who came in search of his sister.
13	"In the Crimson Sky..."; Transliteration: "Akane Iro no Sora ni..." (Japanese: 茜色の空に...)	January 5, 2006
Arika realizes she has developed feelings for Sergay, and is having hard time trying to choose between the fate of an Otome and finding a love of her life. Around this time, Akane Soir, the top Pearl student, is offered a chance to serve as Florence's Meister Otome, but this will separate her from her boyfriend Kazuya forever. At the last second, she decides to elope with Kazuya. Elsewhere, two Meister Otomes from different countries battle against each other.
14	"Otome's SOS"; Transliteration: "Otome no Esu-Ō-Esu" (Japanese: オトメのS·O·S)	January 12, 2006
Arika's friends become concerned over her strange behavior. Meanwhile, Shizuru investigates the boiling Otome conflict between the two countries of Romulus and Remus.
15	"Arika, Crying"; Transliteration: "Arika, Naku." (Japanese: アリカ、泣く.)	January 19, 2006
Sergay rescues Arika from a dangerous situation, allowing her a chance to act on her feelings, but he pushes her away realizing that she may be the true princess of Windbloom. Arika later talks to a similarly distressed Mashiro, promising to see whether Arika can become a Meister Otome first, or Mashiro can become a queen who will make everyone happy.
16	""It's a promise!"" Transliteration: ""Yakusoku da yo!"" (Japanese: 「約束だよ!」)	January 26, 2006
Arika, Nina and Erstin all promise to become Meister Otomes together. However, Nagi de Artai and Schwarz begin a coup against Windbloom and Garderobe.
17	"The Blue Dance/When Dreams Fall"; Transliteration: "Ao no Mai / Omoi, Chiru Toki" (Japanese: 蒼の舞/想い、散るとき)	February 2, 2006
With hostile forces invading the capital of Windbloom, all Otomes are summoned into battle. But an enemy plan causes the source of the Otome technology to shut down. Arika learns that Erstin is an agent of Schwartz, who intends to capture Princess Mashiro, and they are forced to fight against each other. Sergay, trying to protect Arika, reveals himself as her benefactor, and admits that she may be the true princess, causing Nagi to realize that Sergay has withheld information. Nina, greatly upset by Sergay seemingly favored Arika, attacks Arika, but Erstin blocks the attack with her Slave and dies telling her friends she most wanted to be with them. Arika and Nina clash, creating a large explosion.
18	"Whiteout"; Transliteration: "Howaitoauto" (Japanese: ホワイトアウト)	February 9, 2006
Three days after the disastrous raid against Windbloom, Mashiro is forced to join refugees fleeing from their homeland. Nina now serves as the Meister Otome of Nagi. Getting to know her exiled people better, Mashiro learns the painful truth about her leadership qualities as the poor people of Windbloom, forced out by Nagi's occupation, threaten Aoi for her loyalty to Mashiro. Aoi refuses to tell the mob where Mashiro is, falling off a cliff instead, and a grief-stricken Mashiro flees.
19	"Fateful 17-year-old" Transliteration: "Shukumei no Jū Nana Sai" (Japanese: 宿命の17歳)	February 16, 2006
Mashiro wakes up in the village of Aswad and is reunited with Arika. Elsewhere, Natsuki and Nao make their way toward the Republic of Aries in order to request help.
20	"Don't Call me Ni-na"; Transliteration: "Nīna to Yobanaide" (Japanese: ニーナと呼ばないで)	February 23, 2006
Being distanced from her old friends, Nina is drawn ever more closer to her foster-father Sergay. Natsuki's request for aid is turned down in Aries, so she is forced to seek help from Cardair, where the king has just sent his Otome to claim valuable data from the village of Aswad.
21	"When the White Princess Awakens"; Transliteration: "Shiroki Hime, Mezameru Toki" (Japanese: 白き姫、目覚めるとき)	March 2, 2006
Nagi discovers that the true heir to the throne might be Nina. Mashiro feels compassion for her exiled people and asks Aswad to take them in. Sergay forms a plan to capture Mashiro with the assistance of the Valkyrie unit.
22	"Song of Destruction"; Transliteration: "Horobi no Uta" (Japanese: ホロビノウタ)	March 9, 2006
Aswad attacks Cardair in retribution for their betrayal. Back at the village, Sergay and the Valkyries arrive to take Mashiro and Arika by force. Meanwhile, Nagi has Nina activate the true power of the Harmonium.
23	"Arika of the Mysterious Valley"; Transliteration: "Fushigi no Tani no Arika" (Japanese: 不思議の谷のアリカ)	March 16, 2006
Arika, Mashiro and Miyu end up in the Black Valley, where they encounter the long-missing Mai and Mikoto the Cat Goddess. Arika learns that she is the daughter of Lena Sayers, the Otome for the Kingdom of Windbloom, and that Nina is the true princess. Natsuki and Nao later join them. The title of the episode is a reference to Nausicaä of the Valley of the Wind.
24	"For Your Sake..."; Transliteration: "Anata no Tame ni..." (Japanese: あなたのために....)	March 23, 2006
While plans to liberate Windbloom are underway, Sergay puts his life on the line in order to protect Nina and destroy the source of the power of the Slaves and Valkyries, but is shot instead. Nina is forced to operate the Harmonium, a weapon capable of destroying entire cities, in order to keep him alive.
25	"Maiden of the Blue Sky"; Transliteration: "Sōten no Otome" (Japanese: 蒼天の乙女)	March 30, 2006
Nina operates the Harmonium in order to save the fatally wounded Sergay. Meanwhile, Operation Liberate Windbloom is put into full action, with rival armies squaring off against each other and the Otome attempting to gain their powers back. The system powering the Valkyries, powered by Lena's corpse, hinders the Otomes, but Arika destroys her mother's body.
26	"Dream ☆ Wing ~ Whereabouts of a Dream"; Transliteration: "Dream ☆ Wing ~ Yume no Arika" (Japanese: Dream ☆ Wing 〜夢の在処)	March 30, 2006
The Otomes face off against Nagi and the power of the Harmonium, and Arika comes into conflict with Nina in a final battle, having unlocked the true power of the Blue Sky Sapphire. Arika tells Nina that it is not too late to make up for her mistakes, and manages to defeat her even as the Harmonium takes possession of her, destroying the Ultimate Black Diamond. Some time later, Mashiro addresses her people and Sergay awakens from the coma under Nina's care.

== DVD Omake ==
No.	Title	Original release date
1	"The Great Fuka Battle My-HiME THE MOVIE"; Transliteration: "Fūka Taisen Mai-HiME THE MOVIE" (Japanese: 風華大戦 舞-HiME THE MOVIE)	January 27, 2006
This is a joke trailer for a My-HiME movie, supposedly taking place after the events of the My-HiME series.
2	"This Week's Armitage" (Japanese: This Week's Armitage)	February 24, 2006
Explaining events that took place after the incident in episode 3, this special features a broadcast from Aries television, dedicated to their Meister Otome.
3	"Juliet's Conspiracy"; Transliteration: "Jurietto no Inbō" (Japanese: ジュリエットの陰謀)	March 24, 2006
Taking place after episode 8, Nina narrates the embarrassing story of what happens to those indebted to Nao.
4	"Shiho Spirals"; Transliteration: "Shiho Maki Maki no Maki" (Japanese: シホまきまきの巻)	April 26, 2006
The "real" culprit behind the disasters that occurred during the Otome field trip in episodes 9 and 10 is revealed.
5	"By the Red Sky"; Transliteration: "Akane Iro no Sora no Kanata" (Japanese: 茜色の空の彼方)	May 26, 2006
This special reveals what happened to Akane and Kazuya after their elopement in episode 13 up until episode 24.
6	"Graduation Memories: Erstin Ho's Last Smile"; Transliteration: "Erusutin Hō Saigo no Hohoemi" (Japanese: エルスティン·ホー最後の微笑み〜)	June 23, 2006
Knowing the inevitable battle is coming, Erstin tries to enjoy her last days with her friends to the fullest.
7	"In the Village of the Aswad ~ Midori and her pleasant companions ~"; Transliteration: "Asuwado no Mura nite: Midori to Yukai na Nakama-tachi" (Japanese: アスワドの村にて〜ミドリと愉快な仲間達〜)	July 28, 2006
After the events of episode 17, Midori and Mikoto the cat both reveal their secrets.
8	"The Legend of the Fire String Ruby ~ The Truth of Meister Mai ~"; Transliteration: "Enju no Kōgyoku no Densetsu: Maisutā Mai no Shinjitsu" (Japanese: 炎綬の紅玉の伝説〜マイスター·マイの真実〜)	August 25, 2006
An extension of the hot springs scene from episode 23, Mai reveals the truth behind her disappearance and the legend of the Tragic Otome.
9	"My-Otome VS My-HiME"; Transliteration: "Mai-Otome Bāsasu Mai-Hime" (Japanese: 舞-乙HiME VS 舞-HiME)	September 22, 2006
Arika is confronted by Mai about how much her series was not a happy show full of moe. This special is also a teaser trailer for My-Otome Zwei.

The tenth special "Otome no Inori" was released 26 March 2010. It is a picture drama included in the new Blu-ray release.

== My-Otome Zwei ==
No.	Title	Original release date
1	"The Dream Continues"; Transliteration: "Yume no☆Tsuzuki" (Japanese: ユメノ☆ツヅキ)	November 24, 2006
One year after the defeat of Nagi, a powerful new enemy threatens the world, turning its victims into stone. While Meister Arika is ready to protect the people, an argument between her and Queen Mashiro could prove to be her undoing, as it prevents Arika from tapping into her Materialize Zwei form. During a battle, before Mashiro and Arika can settle things, the Black Valley disappears and with it Mashiro and Mai.
2	"Premonition of a Storm"; Transliteration: "A-ra-shi no Yokan" (Japanese: ア·ラ·シの予感)	February 23, 2007
Arika takes a trip to Aries to search for Mashiro. However, she becomes involved in a bus hijacking by former Artai soldiers. To make matters worse, a mysterious type of Slave known as a "CHiLD" appears along with the shadowy entity that attacked Garderobe, with said entity petrifying Haruka Armitage in a battle. It is revealed that Nagi knows something about the new enemy.
3	"The Striped Dance/Labyrinth of the Maiden"; Transliteration: "Shima no Mai/Otome no Meikyū" (Japanese: 縞の舞/乙女の迷宮)	May 25, 2007
Nao and Nina are investigating some hidden ruins that may hold the key to ending the current crisis. There they discover a book of importance. However the shadow entity is intent on stopping them at all costs and preventing the book from leaving the place; Nao manages to defeat the Child, but gets petrified. Creatures like the ones encountered in Airies appear all over the world. Nina then finds herself in the Black Valley.
4	"Connecting Dreams"; Transliteration: "Tsunagaru Yume" (Japanese: つながるゆめ)	August 24, 2007
Leaving her past behind, Nina regains the powers of an Otome to help Arika in the final face off against the mysterious entity, a creature known as Yuma that threatens to destroy the entire world. The other Otomes aid by trying to stop Childs that have spawned across the world. Mashiro and Arika reconcile, and Arika and Nina manage to defeat the entity by combining their attacks. Included is a teaser trailer for My-Otome 0: S.ifr.

== My-Otome 0: S.ifr ==
No.	Title	Original release date
1	"You'll Die If You Look Away"; Transliteration: "Yosomishiteru to Shinimasu yo" (Japanese: よそ見してると死にますよ)	February 22, 2008
Sifr is rescued from kidnappers by Rena and some Meister Otome, as Rena's master Bruce has been sent to retrieve Sifr by her uncle. However, the Five Columns plan on killing her if she is captured by Schwartz. Sifr starts to suspect that Rena may be an Otome too due to her skillful actions although Rena denies it, until another kidnapping attempt on Sifr forces Rena to reveal her powers. Rena defeats her enemies, but an android known as M9 proves more than a match for her, and she overloads her GEM trying to defeat it, falling into the desert.
2	"A HiME and an Otome"; Transliteration: "Hime to Otome" (Japanese: ヒメとヲトメ)	July 25, 2008
Rena survives her fall into the desert with a pair of golden wings, and meets a researcher names Shiro. She is initially conflicted about what to do now that the GEM controlling her power is gone, but with Shiro's encouragement, and the new gem the Blue Sky Sapphire, she becomes willing to fight again and rescue Sifr. Elsewhere, Sifr learns that she is a Weaver, one who can awaken lost technology, and a princess of Windbloom. When Bruce and his companions arrive for a rescue mission, she confronts them about this, but he reassures her as M9 covers Schwartz's escape with her onto a space shuttle.
3	"I Want to Live"; Transliteration: "Watashi wa Ikitainoyo" (Japanese: わたしは生きたいのよ)	November 21, 2008
