= Naomi Shindō =

Japanese voice actress (born 1972)

- 進藤 尚美
- Born: November 9, 1972 (age 53); Kyoto Prefecture, Japan
- Occupation: Voice actress
- Years active: 1999–present
- Agent: Aoni Production

Naomi Shindō (進藤 尚美, Shindō Naomi; born November 9, 1972) is a Japanese voice actress who works for Aoni Production. She is best known for her voice roles as Shizuru Fujino (Mai-hime) (as well as her alternate universe counterpart, Shizuru Viola in Mai-Otome), Jane Diethel in Shaman King, Risai in 12 Kingdoms, Elias "Ace" Hono in Shitsugeki! Machine Robo Rescue and Cagalli Yula Athha (Gundam Seed/Gundam Seed Destiny). She was born in Kyoto Prefecture, and her nickname is "Cindy" (シンディー).

In 2023, it was revealed that Nanako Mori will be replacing Shindō as Cagalli in Mobile Suit Gundam SEED Freedom, which released in January 2024.

== Notable voice roles ==
=== Television animation ===
Year	Title	Role	Notes	Reference
2000	Gear Fighter Dendoh	Hokuto Kusanagi		
2001	Beyblade	Kathy Glory		
2001	Crush Gear Turbo	Kuroudo Marume		
2001	PaRappa the Rapper	Dorothy		
2002	GetBackers	Young Ban Mido		
2002	Gun Frontier	Katarina, Sanae		
2002	Twelve Kingdoms	Risai		
2002	Mobile Suit Gundam SEED	Cagalli Yula Athha, Eileen Canaver, Torii		
2002	Pocket Monsters: Advanced Generation	Kinji		
	Shaman King	Jane Diethel		
2003	Bobobo-bo Bo-bobo	Heppokomaru		
2003	Bokurano	Misumi Tanaka		
2003	Machine Robo Rescue	Arias "Ace" Honoo		
2003	Sonic X	Danny, Lindsey Thorndyke		
2003	Stellvia of the Universe	Leila Barthes		
2003	Tenchi Muyo! Ryo-Ohki	Noike Kamiki Jurai		
2004	Fantastic Children	Conrad, young Sess		
2004	Mobile Suit Gundam SEED Destiny	Cagalli Yula Athha, Torii		
2004	My-HiME	Shizuru Fujino		
2005	Ah! My Goddess	Shohei Yoshida		
2005	Blood+	Young Haji	(episode 22)	
2005	Gaiking Legend of Daiku-Maryu	Naoto Hayami		
2005	My-Otome	Shizuru Viola		
2005	One Piece	Kalifa, Domino, Koza (Young)		
2006	Bakumatsu Kikansetsu Irohanihoheto	Ichimura Tetsunosuke		
2006	Binbou Shimai Monogatari	Echigoya Kinko		
2006	My-Otome Zwei	Shizuru Viola		
2006	Pururun! Shizuku-Chan Aha!	Midoriko-san		
2007	Darker than Black	Havoc		
2007	Dennō Coil	Aiko		
2007	Idolmaster: Xenoglossia	Chikako Minamoto		
2007	Kouchuu Ouja Mushiking Super Battle Movie: Yami no Kaizou Kouchuu	Popo		
2008	Kanokon	Tamamo		
2008	Valkyria Chronicles	Irene Ellet		
2009	Sora Kake Girl	Nina Stratoski		
2010	Asobi ni Ikuyo: Bombshells from the Sky	Durel		
2010	Fairy Tail	Ikaruga		
2010	Fullmetal Alchemist: Brotherhood	Rebecca Catalina		
2010	Heroman	Vera, Narration		
2010	Pocket Monsters: Best Wishes!	Dr. Araragi / Professor Juniper		
2011	Bakugan: Gundalian Invaders	Lena Isis		
2011	Appleseed XIII	Dia		
2011	Astalotte no Omocha!	Enja Níuhali		
2012	Magi: The Labyrinth of Magic	Elizabeth, Ekaterina		
2012	Saki Episode of Side A	Harue Akado		
2012	Hyōka	Shouko Yuasa		
2012	Mobile Suit Gundam AGE	Yuu, Ally Rain		
2013	Beyond the Boundary	Ayaka Shindō		
2013	Hyakka Ryōran Samurai Girls	Kojirō Sasaki		
2013	Pocket Monsters: Best Wishes! Season 2: Episode N	Dr. Araragi / Professor Juniper		
2013	Pocket Monsters: Best Wishes! Season 2: Decolora Adventure	Dr. Araragi / Professor Juniper		
2014	Marvel Disk Wars: The Avengers	Rachel Leighton / Diamondback		
2014	No Game No Life	Miko		
2016	Cardfight!! Vanguard G Stride Gate	Tokimi Shindou		
2017	Dragon Ball Super	Dercori, Maji=Kayo		
2018	Laid-Back Camp	Mineko Inuyama		
2018	Katana Maidens ~ Toji No Miko	Shuuko Yanase		
2019	A Certain Magical Index III	Elizalina		
2019	King of Prism: Shiny Seven Stars	Non Saionji		
2021	Suppose a Kid from the Last Dungeon Boonies Moved to a Starter Town	Rol		
2022	Shinobi no Ittoki	Ayaha Tsuge		
2022	Delicious Party Pretty Cure	Botan Kasai		
2024	Welcome Home	Aki Fujiyoshi		
2024	Senpai Is an Otokonoko	Kyoko Sato	Ep.10	
2026	The Seven Knights of the Marronnier Kingdom	Hyrokkin		

=== Anime film ===
Year	Title	Role	Note
2021	Pretty Guardian Sailor Moon Eternal: The Movie	Ami's mom	2-Part film, Season 4 of Sailor Moon Crystal (Dead Moon arc)

=== Original net animation ===
Year	Title	Role	Notes	References
2021	The Way of the Househusband	Miku's Mother		

=== Games ===
- Another Century's Episode 2 (Marina Carson)
- Another Century's Episode 3 (Marina Carson)
- Battlefield Valkyria: Gallian Chronicles (Irene Ellet)
- God Eater 3 (Player (Female))
- Hokuto Musou (Mamiya)
- Kid Icarus: Uprising (Medusa)
- Mobile Suit Gundam: Extreme Vs. Full Boost and Maxi Boost (Cagalli Yula Athha)
- Mobile Suit Gundam SEED: Rengou vs ZAFT (Cagalli)
- Mobile Suit Gundam SEED Destiny: Rengou vs ZAFT II (Cagalli)
- Mobile Suit Gundam SEED Battle Destiny (Cagalli)
- Samurai Warriors (Ranmaru Mori)
- Samurai Warriors 2 (Ranmaru Mori, Tachibana Ginchiyo)
- Samurai Warriors: Spirit of Sanada (Ranmaru Mori, Ginchiyo Tachibana)
- SD Gundam G Generation Cross Rays (Cagalli)
- Shin Megami Tensei: Digital Devil Saga 2 (Fred)
- Spartan: Total Warrior (Electra)
- Super Robot Wars Alpha 3 (Cagalli Yula Athha, Tori)
- Tales of Zestiria (Forton, Atakk)
- Tokimeki Memorial Girl's Side: 2nd Kiss (Tatsuko Todou)
- Valkyria Chronicles (Irene Ellet)
- Warriors Orochi 3 (Ranmaru Mori, Ginchiyo Tachibana)
- Warriors Orochi 4 (Ranmaru Mori, Ginchiyo Tachibana)
- Xenoblade Chronicles 2 (Tsuki)
- Xenosaga Episode I: Der Wille zur Macht (Dr. Juli Mizrahi)
- Xenosaga Episode II: Jenseits von Gut und Böse (Dr. Juli Mizrahi)
- Xenosaga Episode III: Also Sprach Zarathustra (Dr. Juli Mizrahi)

=== Dubbing roles ===
- Secret Invasion - Sonya Falsworth (Olivia Colman)
- Superman & Lois - Lana Lang (Emmanuelle Chriqui)
- Thomas the Tank Engine and Friends - Jack the Front Loader (Season 6 only)

=== Drama CDs ===
- Fruits Basket: Audio Manga DVD: Day of Departure, Again (Mayuko Shiraki)
- Hayate X Blade (Maki Kamijou)
- Mai-HiME drama CDs (Shizuru Fujino)
- Mai-Otome drama CDs (Shizuru Viola)
- Queen's Blade drama CD 3 (Analista)

=== Radio personality ===
- Okki - Shindi no Bakukarinaito! (April 2007 - March 2008)
- Shindō Naomi no Hanageki Rajiwo (January - July 2012)
- Shindō Naomi to Takemoto Eiji no Hanageki Rajiwo (August - September 2012) - with Eiji Takemoto

=== Radio drama ===
2006

- Goshūshō-sama Ninomiya-kun - Ryouko Ninomiya

=== Web drama ===
2011

- Hanageki - Chiaki Kagura

== Character image songs ==
=== Character singles ===
#	Title	Release date	Anime information
1	Katakoi Enka (片恋艶歌, The Entrancing Flower of Unrequited Love)		Image single of Shizuru Fujino from My-HiME Character & Vocal Album - Hatsukoi Houteishiki ~ Dai 2 Gakushou CD
2	Sakura no hana, sakukoro (The Time When the Cherry Blossoms Bloom)		Shizuru Fujino from My-HiME Drama CD
3	Precious Rose (プレシャス ローズ, Pureshasu Rozu)		Cagalli Yula Athha image song from Gundam SEED Suit CD vol.2 ATHRUN x CAGALLI
