= Yōko Matsuoka =

Japanese actress

- 松岡 洋子
- Born: Tokyo, Japan
- Occupations: Actress; voice actress; narrator
- Years active: 1973–present
- Agent: 81 Produce

Yōko Matsuoka (松岡洋子) is a Japanese actress, voice actress and narrator from Tokyo. She is affiliated with 81 Produce.

== Filmography ==
=== Television animation ===
1970's

- The Adventures of Hutch the Honeybee (1974) (Denta)
- Wakakusa no Charlotte (1977) (Jim)
- Anne of Green Gables (1979) (Laurette Bradley)
- Mobile Suit Gundam (Jill Ratokie, Tachi)
- Manga Sarutobi Sasuke (Sasuke Sarutobi)

1980's

- Ai no Gakko Cuore Monogatari (Antonio)
- GoShogun (Kenta Sanada)
- Belle and Sebastian (Maria)
- Dash Kappei (Todo)
- City Hunter 2 (1988) (Keiko Kashiwagi)
- Moeru! Oniisan (1988) (Kenji Kokuho)
- Madö King Granzört (1989) (Haruka Daiichi)
- Jungle Book Shōnen Mowgli (1989) (Akru)

1990's

- Future GPX Cyber Formula (1991) (Karl Richter von Randoll)
- Kinnikuman: Scramble for the Throne (1991) (Sayuri Kinniku, Konita, Phoenix Shizuko)
- Sailor Moon (1992) (ep.5 Iguara)
- GeGeGe no Kitaro (fourth series 1996) (Kitarō)
- Himitsu no Akko-chan (third series 1998) (Ganmo's Mother)
- One Piece (Alvida)

2000's

- Gear Fighter Dendoh (Ginga Izumo)
- Zoids: Chaotic Century (Mother)
- Crush Gear Turbo (Heinrich Gang)
- Digimon Tamers (Curly)
- Hikaru no Go (Kōsuke Ochi)
- Ojamajo Doremi (MajoVanilla)
- Ashita no Nadja (2003) (Zabii's mother)
- Kaleido Star (2003) (Jerill Robins)
- Zatch Bell! (2004) (Pamūn)
- My-Otome (2005) (Maria Graceburt)
- Kinda'ichi Case Files (2007) (Ikuko Futagami)
- Golgo 13 (2008) (Peggy)
- Full Metal Alchemist Brotherhood (2009) (Madame Christmas)

2010's

- Danchi Tomoo (2013) (Komatsu)
- Sailor Moon Crystal (2014) (Queen Metaria)
- Spiritpact (2017) (Obaa-sama)

=== Original video animation ===
- AD Police Files (1990) (Gina Marceau)
- Sol Bianca (1990) (Feb Fall)
- Tsuki ga Noboru made ni (1991) - Farmer as a young boy
- My-Otome 0~S.ifr~ (2008) (Maria Graceburt)

=== Animated films ===
- Futari wa Pretty Cure Max Heart: The Movie (2005) (Square)

=== Dubbing roles ===
- The Core (Dr. Talma "Stick" Stickley (Alfre Woodard))
- A Dog's Journey (Hannah Montgomery (Marg Helgenberger))
- A Dog's Purpose (Adult Hannah (Peggy Lipton))
- ER (Dr. Amanda Lee (Mare Winningham))
- Legally Blonde (Mrs. Windham-Vandermark (Raquel Welch))
- A Little Princess (Amelia (Rusty Schwimmer))
- Morning Glory (Colleen Peck (Diane Keaton))
- The Soloist (Jennifer (LisaGay Hamilton))
- Something's Gotta Give (Erica Barry (Diane Keaton))
- Star Trek: Voyager (Kathryn Janeway (Kate Mulgrew))
- Twin Peaks (Norma Jennings (Peggy Lipton))
