= Naotake Furusato =

Japanese anime producer

Naotake Furusato (古里 尚丈, Furusato Naotake; born May 3, 1961) is a Japanese anime producer from Shichinohe, Aomori Prefecture. Furusato produced Crush Gear Turbo and Gear Fighter Dendoh, and conceived and planned of Xuccess Heaven (ザクセスへベン, Zakusesu Heben), a Japanese multimedia project produced by Bandai Namco and Sega Networks. The project launched as an "animation RPG" for smartphones, considered the first of its kind, and later expand to multiple platforms and media in the future. Hirokazu Hisayuki, Yōhei Sasaki, Shō Matsui, Yukiko Akiyama, and Hisashi Hirai work on the project's character design. The opening song is by iRis and Yumemiru Adolescence.

Formerly a producer at Sunrise Studio 8, Furusato established his own company, Odd Eye Creative, in February 2011.

== Works ==
=== TV anime ===
- Mīmu Iro Iro Yume no Tabi (1983) - Production assistant
- Mister Ajikko (1988) - Setting production
- Brave Exkaiser (1990) - Setting production
- The Brave of Sun Fighbird (1991) - Production desk
- The Brave Fighter of Legend Da-Garn (1992) - Production desk
- The Brave Express Might Gaine (1993) - Production desk
- The Brave Police J-Decker (1994) - Production desk
- The Brave of Gold Goldran (1995) - Assistant producer
- Outlaw Star (1998) - Producer
- Angel Links (1999) - Producer
- DinoZaurs: The Series (2000) - Project producer
- Gear Fighter Dendoh (2000) - Producer
- Crush Gear Turbo (2001) - Producer
- Machine Robo Rescue (2003) - Producer
- My-HiME (2004) - Producer
- My-Otome (2005) - Producer
- Idolmaster: Xenoglossia (2007) - Producer
- The Girl Who Leapt Through Space (2009) - Producer
- Phi Brain: Puzzle of God (2011–2013) - Animation producer
- Cross Ange (2014) - Project producer
- Revue Starlight (2018) - Project cooperation

=== Movies ===
- Castle in the Sky (1986) - Production assistant
- Crush Gear Turbo the Movie: Kaiservern's Ultimate Challenge (2002) - Producer
- Fukkō Ōen Masamune Datenicle Gattaiban+ (2021) - Planning, producer

=== OVA ===
- Future GPX Cyber Formula SAGA (1996) - Producer
- Future GPX Cyber Formula SIN (1998) - Producer
- My-Otome Zwei (2006) - Producer
- My-Otome 0: S.ifr (2008) - Producer

=== Web anime ===
- Megohime Animation (2019) - Associate producer

=== Games ===
- Xuccess Heaven (2015) - Planning, original creator

=== Magazine projects ===
- Megami Magazine: Hōkago no Lucky Risupōn (2019) - Original idea, original creator
