= Gear Fighter Dendoh =

Japanese anime television series

- GEAR戦士(ファイター)電童
- Genre: Mecha, Action, Drama
- Created by: Hajime Yatate
- Developed by: Chiaki Morosawa
- Directed by: Mitsuo Fukuda (chief)
- Music by: Toshihiko Sahashi
- Country of origin: Japan
- Original language: Japanese
- No. of episodes: 38 (list of episodes)

Production
- Producers: Naotake Goshima (TV Tokyo); Kazunori Takagi; Naotake Furusato
- Production companies: TV Tokyo; Yomiko Advertising; Sunrise

Original release
- Network: TXN (TV Tokyo)
- Release: October 4, 2000 – June 27, 2001

GEAR Fighter Dendoh (GEAR戦士(ファイター)電童, Gia Faitā Dendō) is a Japanese robot anime television series produced by TV Tokyo, Yomiko Advertising and Sunrise. It was directed by Mitsuo Fukuda, with Chiaki Morosawa handling series scripts, Hirokazu Hisayuki designing the characters and monsters, Satoshi Shigeta serving as mechanical animation director and Toshihiko Sahashi composing the music. The series ran for 38 episodes, from October 4, 2000, to June 27, 2001, on the TV Tokyo network and its affiliates.

The series features many of the production staff and main cast members that worked on the Future GPX Cyber Formula series that concluded in 2000, including Fukuda, Hisayuki, Morosawa, and Shigeta, and many of them went on to participate in the later Mobile Suit Gundam SEED series as well. The production period of the anime was a transitional period in which the production environment for animated works was shifting from the traditional cel coloring and film compositing to coloring and editing on computers, and the percentage of computer production increased in the latter half of the series. Although 3D computer graphics with cel shading were used, they were limited to a small portion of stock shots due to the limited processing power of computers at the time, lack of technical expertise, and budgetary constraints.

== Summary ==
One day, a shiny object crashed from outer space and burst into flames, from where six colored lights flew away. On the opposite shore, a girl with blue hair staggered along the beach. She had run out of strength and collapsed, but there were two mobile terminals beside her, and a figure came to her aid.

17 years later, the giant fortress "Spiral Castle" of Galfa, a mechanical life form that plans to exterminate the human race, flies to the moon one day. From the fortress, the "mecha-beasts," robots under its command, begin their march toward the earth. Hokuto Kusanagi, a boy who has moved to Hoshimi Town, meets Ginga Izumo, a boy practicing kenpō in the schoolyard of his elementary school. Soon after that, a number of mecha-beasts, which have taken up interceptor satellites, fly in and begin attacking the town. Worried about their families, they hurry home, but on the way they find a lost little girl crying and try to save her. Just as a mecha-beast sets its sights on them and attacks, a giant blue robot breaks through the floor and appears, welcoming the startled pair into its chest cockpit. It is the "Gear Fighter Dendoh," the hope of mankind.

== Characters ==
Ginga Izumo (出雲 銀河, Izumo Ginga)
Voiced by: Yōko Matsuoka
A fifth grader at Hoshimi Elementary School, he is an active boy who prefers to act rather than think. When the Galfa attacked the earth, he and Hokuto were chosen as Dendoh pilots and he was entrusted with the blue Gear Commander. At first, he was proud of being chosen as a Dendoh pilot and underestimated the battle against Galfa. However, as he experienced defeats and setbacks, he matured and awakened to his mission to protect the earth. Although he and Hokuto often clashed, they gradually came to recognize each other.
Hokuto Kusanagi (草薙 北斗, Kusanagi Hokuto)
Voiced by: Naomi Shindō
A fifth grader at Hoshimi Elementary School, he is an intelligent boy who is both thoughtful and decisive. On the day he moved to Hoshimi Town with his family, he encountered an attack by Galfa. He and Ginga are chosen as Dendoh pilots and he is entrusted with the black Gear Commander. Although he is perplexed at having to bear the fate of the earth on his shoulders, he becomes more and more aware of his role as a Dendoh pilot as he witnesses the crisis on the earth. Although he and Ginga, who have opposite personalities, sometimes disagree with each other, they gradually build a relationship of trust.
Vega / Orie Kusanagi (ベガ / 草薙 織絵, Bega / Kusanagi Orie)
Voiced by: Kotono Mitsuishi
The second-in-command of GEAR, an earth defense organization, she was initially scheduled to be Dendoh's pilot. She was an advisor to combat command and supported Dendoh's battles by standing on the front lines herself. She is also an expert in combat, with a number of special weapons, and is skilled enough to go toe-to-toe with the black knight Arthea. One of the people deeply involved in the creation of GEAR, she has a wealth of knowledge about Dendoh, data weapons, and Galfa. Her costume is made of the latest technological materials.
Arthea (アルテア, Arutea)
Voiced by: Kazuhiro Nakata / Kenji Nojima (childhood)
A Knight Ogre pilot with a white gear commander sent from the main planet of Galfa to capture data weapons. He is the elite guard of Emperor Galfa, who holds the title of Black Knight, and his rank is equal to that of Spiral Castle. He has an outstanding fighting sense, and has tormented Dendoh many times.
Elise Willamette (エリス・ウィラメット, Erisu Wirametto)
Voiced by: Tomoko Ishimura
A prodigy girl who graduated from M.I.T. (Massachusetts Institute of Technology) at the age of 10. With a PhD in electronics, she was recruited by GEAR as the youngest person ever. She was initially working on data weapon research at GEAR's U.S. branch, but was selected as the chief data weapon analyst and transferred to the Japan headquarters. After arriving in Japan, she transferred to Hoshimi Elementary School as a chaperone of Ginga and his friends.
Galfa Emperor (ガルファ皇帝, Garufa kōtei)
Voiced by: Show Hayami
A mechanical life form that reigns at the top of the mechanical empire of Galfa. He seeks to eliminate mankind from all the stars and become the king of the universe itself, and sends Spiral Castle to Earth as his sentinel. He treats his subordinates as disposable pawns, and is ruthless and merciless in his treatment of those who fail him.
Subaru (スバル)
Voiced by: Kenichi Suzumura
The son of Emperor Galfa, in the position of Prince of the Galfa Empire. Like Arthea, he is qualified to control the Ogre. After the failed invasion of Earth by the Spiral Castle, he was assigned to search for the 7th Data Weapon and visited Earth with Zero. He loves Galfa as his brother and hates Hokuto, the Ogre pilot who took him away from him. However, as he exchanged feelings with the brainwashed Hokuto, he began to realize that feelings of joy and loneliness had been born within him, and he began to be puzzled.

== Gear Machines ==
=== Gear Fighter Dendoh (Gear 戦士電童, Gia Faitaa Dendou) ===
- Spec
  - Height 24.5 meters
  - Weight 399.8 tons

=== Knight Gear Oger (騎士 Gear 凰牙, Naito Gia Ouga) ===
- Spec
  - Height 28.5 meters
  - weight 401.0 tons

=== Unicorn Drill ===
- Spec
  - Height 23.0 meters

=== Viper Whip ===
- Spec
  - Height 58.0 meters

=== Leo Circle ===
- Spec
  - Height 15.0 meters

=== Bull Horn ===
- Spec
  - Height 16.0 meters

=== Dragon Flare ===
- Spec
  - Height 27.0 meters

=== Gatling Boar ===
- Spec
  - Height 12.0 meters

=== Chojuuoh Kiba ===
- Spec
  - Height 17.4 meters

=== Phoenix Alae ===
- Spec
  - Height 20.4 meters

== Galfa Empire ==
Seventeen years before the events of the series, Emperor Galfa was a biological manager program from planet Alktos that sought to destroy human life due to how they can and have easily destroyed nature. In an effort to save the environment from human intervention, he created a vast empire of machines to exterminate human life and named the empire after himself. In the final episode Galfa reveals his true form as a six headed mechanical dragon, possibly a reference to The Beast From The Sea or Orochi. After conquering the planet he created a large moon-sized satellite resembling the Death Star that emits an energy barrier that shields the entire planet and not only houses all of his forces, but also is armed with a gravitational cannon that can destroy planets.

=== Main Forces ===
- Spiral City: flight, green lasers, underside drill, storage, an energy barrier, and an AI terminal program of the same name capable of emitting electricity.
- Galfa Sotai: First appear in episode 1. Powers include flight, assimilating beak and hand claws, purple energy bolts from the forehead, beak lasers, and a purple laser pistol. They are often translated as Galfa Soldiers and Robot Beasts.
- Witter: First appears in episode 1. Powers include a probe called a chip in his own image that is composed of liquid metal and is armed with a laser pistol, flight, an EMP field that can shut down electronics save for larger mechanical enemies and can slowly drain their energy, a segmented body that can be used as projectiles, pink finger lasers, and can reform as long as his head is intact. He fights Dendoh in episode 21.
- Absolute: First appears in episode 1. Powers include a probe called a chip in his own image that is composed of liquid metal and is armed with a laser pistol, a liquid metal body, and speed. He fights Dendoh in episode 26.
- Gourmet: First appears in episode 1. Powers include a probe called a chip in his own image that is composed of liquid metal and is armed with a laser pistol, flight, a pink mouth beam that can damage objects as large as the Aldebaran, a super electromagnetic net strong enough to disrupt the use of data weapons, back missiles, and extendable arms. He fights Dendoh in episode 25.
- Capture Machine Beast: First appear in episode 2. Powers include flight, a capture tentacle in each of its four underside spikes with them able to create a pink force field, and yellow lasers from the underside.
- Aldebaran: Appears in episode 11 and episodes 21 to 25. Powers include light speed flight, an underside tractor beam, and Galfa Guard storage. It serves as Emperor Galfa's space cruiser later commanded by Altiar.
- Lagou: Appears in episodes 15 to 19. Powers include flight, super speed, fangs, talons, consuming metal to regenerate, flames from his right head mouth, blue energy balls from his left head mouth, a whip tail, and virus spikes on the fin on his chest. It is not a machine rather it is the cyborg pet of Emperor Galfa. According to Meteo in episode 16 he is 22.2 meters tall, has a 57.5 meter wingspan, and weighs 955.5 tons.
- Galfa Guard: Appear in episodes 24 and 25. Powers include flight and green palm and scalp beams.
- Zero: First appears in episode 27. Powers include flight, an extendable metal staff, thirty eight green lasers around his body, holograms of his human form, and indefinite reformation. In human form he also possesses flight and his staff while also having a high resistance to projectiles, can hack into computers with little effort, can quickly move underwater, is armed with ball-like grenades as well as bombs capable of rivaling atomic blasts, and an extremely high resistance to explosions. He can combine with Vector to become Vector Zero.
  - Vector: First appears in episode 27 although it does not return until episode 35. Powers include flight, a pair of blue lasers on the underside, and indefinite reformation. It is actually an automated suit of armor that Zero can combine into to become Vector Zero.
  - Vector Zero: Appears in the final episode. Powers include flight, blue shoulder beams, a double sided spear version of Zero's staff, green finger lasers, and indefinite reformation.
- Emperor Galfa: Although he appears early in the series his true form is not seen until the final episode. Powers include an energy shield-like seal, six gigantic heads each being over 200 meters in length, circular energy fields that protect the jaws, and mouth flames that rival napalm.

=== Machine Beasts ===
- Orbiton: Appears in episode 1. Powers include flight, green laser cannons from the right shoulder, and pelvis missiles. Unlike other machine beasts this is mass-produced as eighteen separate creatures instead of just one.
- Bloodon: Appears in episode 2. Powers include purple lasers from its four eyes and palms, saw fingers, and extendable arms.
- Palaboon: Appears in episode 3. Its only known power is yellow heat beams from the satellite dish on its back.
- Scoodas: Appears in episode 5. Its only known power is speed. It can execute a Triple Stream Attack, a homage to the Jet Stream Attack of the Black Tri-Stars from Mobile Suit Gundam.
- Mobiluz: Appears in episode 5. Powers include speed and bombs. It can execute a Triple Stream Attack, a homage to the Jet Stream Attack of the Black Tri-Stars from Mobile Suit Gundam.
- Camioon: Appears in episode 5. Powers include speed and bombs. It can execute a Triple Stream Attack, a homage to the Jet Stream Attack of the Black Tri-Stars from Mobile Suit Gundam.
- Fightersu: Appears in episode 6. Powers include flight, dual torso machine guns, and extendable jawed arms armed with missiles in the mouths.
- Siglight: Appears in episode 7. Although it showed no powers in the series it had extendable arms in the game.
- Crane: Appears in episode 7. Powers include an extendable claw crane and purple lasers from the top of its body.
- Tangil: Appears in episode 7. Powers include floating on top of water, missile pods on the top side, purple lasers from the many eyes on top of the bow and sides,
- Zonbel: Appears in episode 8. Powers include a pair of spiked discs that act like saws on its shovel claw and twin triple barreled machine guns.

=== Professional Machines ===
- Virus: Appears in episodes 9, 10, and 11. Powers include swimming, flight, very powerful red energy balls from the torso, can morph into a fighter that flies at super sonic speeds, and an energy bladed green laser gun with shots that rival napalm. In episode 37 it is depicted that Virus was one of Emperor Galfa's earliest minions.
- Lock: Appears in episodes 9, 10, and 11. Powers include flight, a large chest harpoon, swimming, and an extremely high body temperature.
- Error: Appears in episodes 9, 10, and 11. Powers include flight, extendable arms, pincer claw hands, and swimming.
- Bug: Appears in episodes 9, 10, and 11. Powers include flight, twin energy swords, swimming, a rainbow beam from its head cone, and emitting lightning pillars that can go on for several miles. In episode 37 it is depicted that Bug was one of Emperor Galfa's earliest minions.
- Crash: Appears in episodes 9 and 10.Powers include flight, strength, arm missiles, and dual shoulder energy cannons strong enough to destroy small islands. Although it was destroyed before pursuing Dendoh underwater, it is assumed it has the ability to swim like the other five members of Altair's platoon.
- Hang: Appears in episodes 9, 10, and 11. Powers include flight, a sword, a red club, a javelin, and swimming. In episode 37 it is depicted that Hang was one of Emperor Galfa's earliest minions. In the game it was also armed with floating mines orbiting it.
- Rom: Appears in episodes 21 and 22. Powers include flight, double sided spear that fires pink energy bolts, white energy nets, and a blue forehead beam that amplifies gear commanders.
- Ram: Appears in episodes 21 and 22. Powers include flight, a spike ended hammer that fires pink energy bolts, white energy nets, and a red forehead beam that amplifies gear commanders.
- Red Bit: Appears in episode 27. Powers include flight, a capsule form armed with a green laser at the top, a purple head laser, an ax tail, and light bending speed.
- Black Bit: Appears in episode 27. Powers include flight, a capsule form armed with a green laser at the top, a pink head laser, an ax tail, and light bending speed.
- Jel: Appears in episode 28. Powers include flight and a sphered transparent energy field that fires pink lasers and can fuse with pieces of destroyed machine professionals.
  - Jam: Appears in episode 28. Powers include flight, four extendable arms with pincer claws, two launchable chest harpoons, arm missiles, and can morph into a fighter armed with pink energy balls fired from the wings. It is actually Jel after combining with the remains of Virus, Lock, Error, Bug, Crash, and Hang in Siberia.
- Trag: Appears in episode 29. Powers include flight, an energy beam from the chest, a green rapid-fire head laser, and can make its body tough enough to withstand a single final attack.
- Fritz: Appears in episode 29. Powers include swimming, flight, elephant tusks, and green explosive acid from its elephant-like trunk that can morph into energy balls while underwater.
- Diles: Appears in episode 31. Powers include disguising itself as a rock, swimming, flight, an extendable blade-like whip tail, and a sickle for each arm.
- Jack: Appears in episode 32. Powers include flight and twin red boomerangs.
- Legacy: Appears in episode 32. Powers include flight, head horn lightning, can morph its right hand into a sword by retracting the fingers, and a self-destruct system armed with a pair of restrainer belts in the sides that explodes at 20 kilometers above sea level.
- Bias: Appears in episodes 33 and 34. Powers include flight, a 14-tube rocket pod in each pectoral, a pink laser cannon on each hip, speed, and a resistance to energy based attacks.
- Worm: Appears in episodes 33 and 34. Powers include burrowing, whip-like arms when not in drill mode, and flight.
- Lance: Appears in episode 36. Powers include zweihander sword, and shield, and flight.
- Mace: Appears in episode 36. Powers include a long ax, a shield, and flight.

=== Heavy Machines ===
- Spear: Appears in episode 13 although its presence is known at the end of episode 12. Powers include flight, four red spear arms, and green energy beams from the upper section.
- Scissors: Appears in episode 13. Powers include flight, launchable crushing beetle mandibles on the head on a tread, and a red heat ray from each wing,
- Elecideath Probe: Appear in episode 14. Powers include spear legs, burrowing through ice, a high resistance to cold, and purple eye beams.
- Elecideath: Appears in episode 14. Powers include flight, satellite hacking mines, summoning probes, burrowing through ice, a high resistance to cold, orange and purple head lasers, and can swim at 500 kilometers per hour.
- Filla: Appears in episode 15. Powers include flight, stinger tipped tendrils, tiny mines from its leaves, and purple lasers from each shoulder.
- Skasha: Appears in episode 16. Powers include flight, mouth rockets, pink lasers from its four arms, and can split itself in half and use both halves to entrap enemies in a yellow electrical field as it crushes them with its body.
- Defender: Appears in episode 17. Powers include flight, four remote pink energy barrier generators, and a pair of turbines that fire liquid nitrogen.
- Diver: Appears in episode 18. Powers include flight at 5000 knots, swimming as far down as ten kilometers underwater at 131 kilometers per hour, sharp teeth armed with laser cannon at each very end of the mouth, and a powerful tail. According to Dendoh's data it is 308.5 meters long although in actual length comparison it is barely over 100 meters.
- Azaroth: Appears in episode 19. Powers include flight and dual green laser cannons.
- Babulto: Appears in episode 20. Powers include flight, crab claw arms armed with flamethrowers, and explosive foam from its mouth.

== Episode list ==
No.	Title	Directed by	Written by	Storyboarded by	Original release date
1	"The First Day - Dendoh Launches -"; Transliteration: "Hajimari no hi ― Dendō shutsugeki ―" (Japanese: 始まりの日―電童出撃―)	Masakazu Obara	Sukehiro Tomita	Masakazu Obara	4 October 2000
2	"It Appears! Unicorn Drill"; Transliteration: "Shutsugen! Yunikōndoriru" (Japanese: 出現！ユニコーンドリル)	Tetsuya Watanabe	Sukehiro Tomita	Masamitsu Hidaka	11 October 2000
3	"Knight Ogre Attacks!"; Transliteration: "Naito Ōga raishū!" (Japanese: 騎士凰牙 来襲！)	Masahiro Hosoda	Masaharu Amiya	Keisaku Asuka	18 October 2000
4	"The Trembling Spiral Castle"; Transliteration: "Senritsu no rasen-jō" (Japanese: 戦慄の螺旋城)	Yasuhiro Minami	Hiroyuki Yoshino	Yasuhiro Minami	25 October 2000
5	"Explosion! Viper Whip"; Transliteration: "Sakuretsu! Baipā Wippu" (Japanese: 炸裂！バイパーウィップ)	Masakazu Obara	Yasuko Kobayashi	Masakazu Obara	1 November 2000
6	"Leo Circle's Courage"; Transliteration: "Reo Sākuru no yūki" (Japanese: レオサークルの勇気)	Masahiro Hosoda	Yasuko Kobayashi	Susumu Yamaguchi	8 November 2000
7	"Assault! Bull Horn"; Transliteration: "Totsugeki! Buruhōn" (Japanese: 突撃！ブルホーン)	Tetsuya Watanabe	Masaharu Amiya	Tetsuya Watanabe	15 November 2000
8	"A New Companion"; Transliteration: "Atarashī nakama" (Japanese: 新しい仲間)	Yasuhiro Minami	Hiroyuki Yoshino	Yasuhiro Minami	22 November 2000
9	"The Missing Data Weapons"; Transliteration: "Kieta Dēta Wepon" (Japanese: 消えたデータウェポン)	Shigeki Takagi	Masaharu Amiya	Eiji Yamanaka	29 November 2000
10	"Zero Seconds Before Dendoh's Destruction"; Transliteration: "Dendō hakai 0-byō mae" (Japanese: 電童破壊0秒前)	Manabu Ono	Hiroyuki Yoshino	Masamitsu Hidaka	6 December 2000
11	"Decisive Match! Dendoh vs. Ogre"; Transliteration: "Kessen! Dendō tai Ōga" (Japanese: 決戦！電童対凰牙)	Masakazu Obara	Yasuko Kobayashi	Susumu Yamaguchi	13 December 2000
12	"Omen of Crisis"; Transliteration: "Kiki no yokan" (Japanese: 危機の予感)	Masahiro Hosoda	Chiaki Morosawa	Masahiro Hosoda	20 December 2000
13	"Ginga's Father Comes Home"; Transliteration: "Ginga no chichi, kaeru" (Japanese: 銀河の父、帰る)	Shigeki Takagi	Chiaki Morosawa	Masamitsu Hidaka	27 December 2000
14	"No Power!"; Transliteration: "Denki ga nai!" (Japanese: 電気がない！)	Yasuhiro Minami	Hiroyuki Yoshino	Yasuhiro Minami	10 January 2001
15	"Ghost Story! The Data Weapons in School"; Transliteration: "Kaidan! Gakkō no Dēta Wepon" (Japanese: 怪談！学校のデータウェポン)	Manabu Ono	Shōji Tonoike	Yū Kō	17 January 2001
16	"The Demon from the Moon"; Transliteration: "Tsuki no akuma" (Japanese: 月の悪魔)	Naoki Hishikawa	Yasuko Kobayashi	Naoki Hishikawa	24 January 2001
17	"Lagou's Teeth"; Transliteration: "Ragō no kiba" (Japanese: ラゴウの牙)	Shigeki Awai	Shōji Tonoike	Gorō Taniguchi	31 January 2001
18	"8000 Meter Deep Battle"; Transliteration: "Shindo 8000 M no tatakai" (Japanese: 深度8000Mの戦い)	Yasuhiro Minami	Hiroyuki Yoshino	Mitsuo Fukuda; Yasuhiro Minami	7 February 2001
19	"Resurrected Life"; Transliteration: "Yomigaeru inochi" (Japanese: よみがえる命)	Masakazu Obara	Hiroyuki Yoshino	Masakazu Obara	14 February 2001
20	"Burn Up, Ginga!"; Transliteration: "Moero! Ginga!!" (Japanese: 燃えろ！銀河！！)	Shigeki Takagi	Masaharu Amiya	Yū Kō	21 February 2001
21	"Revived Black Knight!"; Transliteration: "Kuro kishi fukkatsu!" (Japanese: 黒騎士復活！)	Naoki Hishikawa	Yasuko Kobayashi	Naoki Hishikawa	28 February 2001
22	"Mother's Secret"; Transliteration: "Haha no himitsu" (Japanese: 母の秘密)	Manabu Ono	Shōji Tonoike	Manabu Ono	7 March 2001
23	"Locked Memories"; Transliteration: "Tozasareta kioku" (Japanese: 閉ざされた記憶)	Yasuhiro Minami	Chiaki Morosawa	Mitsuo Fukuda; Shigeki Takagi; Yasuhiro Minami	14 March 2001
24	"Long Night"; Transliteration: "Nagai yoru" (Japanese: 長い夜)	Hiroshi Kawashima	Shōji Tonoike	Shigeki Takagi; Masakazu Obara	21 March 2001
25	"In Midst of Flames"; Transliteration: "Honō no naka de" (Japanese: 炎の中で)	Masakazu Obara	Masaharu Amiya	Susumu Yamaguchi	28 March 2001
26	"The Day Spiral Castle Falls"; Transliteration: "Rasen-jō no ochiru hi" (Japanese: 螺旋城の落ちる日)	Shigeki Takagi	Hiroyuki Yoshino	Masamitsu Hidaka	4 April 2001
27	"Stealthy Shadow"; Transliteration: "Shinobi yoru kage" (Japanese: 忍びよる影)	Naoki Hishikawa; Masahiro Takada	Yasuko Kobayashi	Hiroshi Kawashima	11 April 2001
28	"Subaru's Challenge"; Transliteration: "Subaru no chōsen" (Japanese: スバルの挑戦)	Manabu Ono	Masaharu Amiya	Manabu Ono; Mitsuo Fukuda	18 April 2001
29	"Hokuto in Danger!"; Transliteration: "Hokuto no kiki!" (Japanese: 北斗の危機！)	Yasuhiro Minami	Shōji Tonoike	Naoki Hishikawa; Yasuhiro Minami	25 April 2001
30	"The Greatest Rival!"; Transliteration: "Saidai no teki!" (Japanese: 最大の敵！)	Shigeki Takagi	Hiroyuki Yoshino	Mitsuo Fukuda; Masamitsu Hidaka	2 May 2001
31	"Hokuto's Cries, Ginga's Tears"; Transliteration: "Hokuto no sakebi, ginga no namida" (Japanese: 北斗の叫び、銀河の涙)	Masakazu Obara	Hiroyuki Yoshino	Masakazu Obara; Susumu Yamaguchi	9 May 2001
32	"Fly, Subaru!"; Transliteration: "Tobe! Subaru!" (Japanese: 飛べ！スバル！)	Naoki Hishikawa; Masahiro Takada	Tomoya Asano	Naoki Hishikawa	16 May 2001
33	"GEAR's Destruction!"; Transliteration: "GEAR kaimetsu!" (Japanese: GEAR壊滅！)	Manabu Ono	Shōji Tonoike	Manabu Ono; Mitsuo Fukuda	23 May 2001
34	"Zero Attack!"; Transliteration: "Zero atakku!!" (Japanese: ゼロ・アタック！！)	Yasuhiro Minami	Noboru Kimura	Manabu Ono; Shigeki Takagi	30 May 2001
35	"Takeoff to Space!"; Transliteration: "Hasshin! Sora e" (Japanese: 発進！宇宙へ)	Shigeki Takagi	Tomoya Asano	Yasuhiro Minami; Naoki Hishikawa; Mitsuo Fukuda	6 June 2001
36	"Sea of Storms"; Transliteration: "Arashi no umi" (Japanese: 嵐の海)	Masakazu Obara	Noboru Kimura	Masakazu Obara; Mitsuo Fukuda; Yasuhiro Minami	13 June 2001
37	"The Truth About Arktos"; Transliteration: "Arukutosu no shinjitsu" (Japanese: アルクトスの真実)	Naoki Hishikawa; Masahiro Takada	Hiroyuki Yoshino	Naoki Hishikawa; Susumu Yamaguchi	20 June 2001
38	"The Legend of the Stars - And the Day of Beginnings -"; Transliteration: "Hoshi no densetsu ― Soshite, hajimari no hi ―" (Japanese: 星の伝説―そして、始まりの日―)	Mitsuo Fukuda; Manabu Ono	Chiaki Morosawa	Yasuhiro Minami; Manabu Ono; Mitsuo Fukuda	27 June 2001

== Video game ==
GEAR Fighter Dendoh has spawned one platform title for the PlayStation. It was released in 2001.

Dendoh was also featured in the Super Robot Wars series of Japanese simulation games. It has appeared in 2002's Super Robot Wars R for the Game Boy Advance and Super Robot Wars MX for the PlayStation 2 and its PSP version.

== Homage Weapons ==
In episode 24 of the series, Dendoh is forced to fight without the aid of data weapons, forcing it to use an arsenal of weapons that are homages to various early mecha anime. This incarnation has been dubbed as Full Armor Dendoh.

- 3-Tube Cannon and 9-Tube Missile Launcher: On the left and right shoulders, respectively; these weapons are a homage to Xabungle, specifically its full armor mode.
- Beam Rifle: On the right hand; this weapon is a homage to the original Gundam's beam rifle.
- Bow and Energy Encased Arrows: On the left wrist; this weapon is a homage to Raideen.
- 3-Barrel Missile Launcher: On the right ankle; this weapon is a homage to the Zaku 2 from the original Mobile Suit Gundam.
- Super Dendoh Yo-Yos: Stored on the hips; these weapons are a homage to Combattler V.
- Double Tomahawk: Stored on back; these weapons are a homage to Getter Robo G's form of Getter Dragon.
- Dendoh Sword: Stored on the back of the waist; this weapon is a homage to Voltes V.
