= Naotake =

- Gender: Male

Origin
- Origin: Japanese
- Meaning: Different meanings depending on the kanji used

Naotake (written: 直剛, 尚武 or 尚丈) is a masculine Japanese given name. Notable people with the name include:

- Naotake Furusato (古里 尚丈; born 1961), Japanese anime producer
- Naotake Hanyu (羽生 直剛; born 1979), Japanese footballer
- Naotake Satō (佐藤 尚武; 1882 1971), Japanese diplomat and politician
