= List of My-HiME episodes =

The following is a list of episodes from the anime My-HiME. The opening theme is Shining☆Days by Minami Kuribayashi, which is also used as the ending theme in the final episode. The ending theme is You were the Sky (君が空だった kimi ga sora datta^{?}) by Aki Misato, though episode 15 uses It's only the fairy tale by Yuko Miyamura.

== List of episodes ==
| No. | Title | Original release date |
|---|---|---|
| 1 | "A Girl's Most Important Event"; Transliteration: "Sore wa Otome no Ichidaiji" (Japanese: それは☆乙女の一大事) | September 30, 2004 |
Mai Tokiha and her brother Takumi are on a boat trip when a girl with a sword, Mikoto Minagi, is found in the water. They pull her aboard, but are attacked by Natsuki Kuga. The boat is destroyed in the battle between Mikoto and Natsuki, and Mai shows strange abilities.
| 2 | "After-School Secrets?"; Transliteration: "Himitsu no Hōkago?" (Japanese: ヒミツの放課後?) | October 7, 2004 |
Mai and Takumi go to their first day at school. Mai skips class and bonds with Mikoto over a bowl of ramen. Takumi is attacked by a monster, and Mai and Natsuki put aside their differences to fight it.
| 3 | "Dance of Flames/Star's Oath"; Transliteration: "Honō no Mai / Hoshi no Chikai" (Japanese: 炎の舞/星の誓い) | October 14, 2004 |
Mai calls forth Kagutsuchi and defeats the Orphan. Later, Mashiro Kazahana explains to Mai that she is a HiME and that she is needed to fight Orphans. Mikoto becomes Mai's roommate.
| 4 | "Mischief of the Wind"; Transliteration: "Kaze no Itazura" (Japanese: 風のイ·タ·ズ·ラ) | October 21, 2004 |
Orphans are causing trouble at school. Mai, Mikoto and Natsuki join forces to stop them.
| 5 | "Rain — Tears..."; Transliteration: "Ame — Namida..." (Japanese: 雨――.涙......) | October 28, 2004 |
An Orphan is attacking city buses, but Mai has her own problems. The stress of taking care of her ailing brother gets to her, and Yuuichi Tate comforts her.
| 6 | "The Passionate Age of 17 (^^;)"; Transliteration: "Moeru Jūnana-sai (^^;)" (Japanese: もえる十七歳(^^;)) | November 4, 2004 |
Yuuichi and Shiho Munakata enlist Mai, Takumi and Mikoto to help them prepare for a wedding. Shiho worries that Yuuichi likes Mai, and makes Mai root for her love of Yuuichi. Midori Sugiura turns out to be a HiME and ends up as a teacher at the school.
| 7 | "Lost Kittens"; Transliteration: "Maigo no Koneko-tachi" (Japanese: 迷子の仔猫たち) | November 11, 2004 |
Mikoto falls under the influence of Nao Yuuki who uses her powers to steal. Mikoto has second thoughts, and the other HiME put a stop to it.
| 8 | "Precious Thing."; Transliteration: "Taisetsu na Mono." (Japanese: たいせつなもの.) | November 18, 2004 |
The school holds a festival. Akane Higurashi fights an Orphan to protect her boyfriend, Kazuya Kurauchi, but Miyu Greer kills Akane's Child, and Kazuya dies. Nagi Homura explains that the life of the person who is most important to the HiME is forfeit, not the HiME's life as Akane thought. Mai fights with Kagutsuchi for the second time, and reveals her powers to Reito.
| 9 | "The Sea, The Maidens, and Natsuki's Secret"; Transliteration: "Umi to Otome to Natsuki no Himitsu" (Japanese: 海とオトメとなつきのヒミツ♪) | November 25, 2004 |
Mai's relationships with Reito Kanzaki and Tate continue to develop. Natsuki takes Mai and Mikoto on an information gathering mission at an abandoned First District building. Natsuki explains she is trying to destroy it.
| 10 | "Cake Wars!!!"; Transliteration: "Kēki Taisen!!!" (Japanese: ケーキ大戦!!!) | December 2, 2004 |
Mai and her friends have their cake baking contest organizaed by Midori Sugiura but the contest is interrupted by an Orphan. Takumi is attacked by another Orphan and it turns out Akira Okuzaki is a HiME — and a girl. She saves Takumi, who throws a birthday party for Mai.
| 11 | "Dance of Light and Darkness"; Transliteration: "Hikari to Yami no Rondo" (Japanese: 光と闇の輪舞(ロンド)) | December 9, 2004 |
A vampire is stalking the campus and seeking out the HiMEs. Nagi tells Mai not to get involved with it, since there appears to be another group looking to use the HiME. The school's nun, Yukariko Sanada, turns out to be a HiME and defeats it.
| 12 | "The Smile of an Angel"; Transliteration: "Tenshi no Hohoemi" (Japanese: 天使のほほえみ) | December 16, 2004 |
Joseph Greer, Miyu Greer, and Alyssa Searrs are working for the Searrs Foundation. They kidnap Natsuki, and Yukino Kikukawa, who is a HiME, uses her powers to find her. Mai and Mikoto go to rescue her, and save her from Miyu and Alyssa Searrs. In the end, Alyssa takes over control of the operation from Greer.
| 13 | "~Night of the Tamayura~"; Transliteration: "~Tamayura no Yoru~" (Japanese: 〜たまゆらの夜〜) | December 23, 2004 |
The school hosts a romantic festival, and Mai and Reito go on a date. They are about to kiss when Tate interrupts, angering Shiho. Alyssa and Miyu test out Alyssa's powers, and Natsuki investigates District One.
| 14 | "The Targeted Academy"; Transliteration: "Nerawareru Gakuen" (Japanese: ねらわれる学園) | January 6, 2005 |
Alyssa destroys a bridge with a shot from heaven, and the Searrs group sends in its personal army and takes over the school, looking for HiMEs. Nagi and Mashiro then gather the HiMEs in a cavern.
| 15 | "A High School Girl ﾐ☆ Soars To the Heavens"; Transliteration: "Ama Kakeru ﾐ☆ Jōshikōsei" (Japanese: 天翔ける ﾐ☆ 女子高生) | January 13, 2005 |
The HiMEs defeat the Searrs soldiers and rush to confront Alyssa. Alyssa attempts to destroy the school (and students) with a blast from her Child, but Mai intercepts the beam with Kagutsuchi, seemingly killing her. Alyssa and Miyu escape, but Joseph Greer shoots Alyssa and Miyu kills him.
| 16 | "Parade ♪" (Japanese: Parade ♪) | January 20, 2005 |
Mai shows up late for class, to Mikoto's delight. Midori organizes the HiMEs into the HiME Force, and takes them out to karaoke to bond. Takumi discovers Akira's true identity and she must kill him. Afterwards, Nagi tells them that there will be no more Orphans; now they must fight each other's Children. The HiME's Carnival had just begun.
| 17 | "Deceitful Lips"; Transliteration: "Usotsuki na, Kuchibiru" (Japanese: うそつきな、唇) | January 27, 2005 |
Nagi informs the HiME Force that an evil star is coming, and the only one who can save the world is the HiME who defeats all other HiMEs. Tate tells Mai that he must stay with Shiho, because he caused her to be injured. Takumi is accepted for a transplant at a US hospital.
| 18 | "――The Beginning."; Transliteration: "――Hajimari." (Japanese: ――はじまり.) | February 3, 2005 |
A mysterious ghost-like, flute-playing HiME attacks Mai. Mikoto protects her, but Mai tells her not to fight. Yukariko betrays the group, and causes Natsuki to fight Nao, saying Nao attacked her.
| 19 | "Labyrinth of the Heart"; Transliteration: "Kokoro no Meikyū" (Japanese: こころの迷宮) | February 10, 2005 |
The HiMEs start to turn on each other; Yukino is blackmailed into attacking Mai. Takumi worries about being a burden to Mai, and makes plans to go to America alone. Akira grows more devoted to Takumi, putting him in danger. Shiho kisses Tate in front of Mai to hurt her.
| 20 | "Dance of Flames/Tears of Destiny"; Transliteration: "Honō no Mai / Namida no Unmei" (Japanese: 炎の舞/涙の運命) | February 17, 2005 |
A crow-like Child, the Child of the flute-playing HiME, causes Mikoto to fight and kill Akira's Child. Mai arrives in time for Takumi to evaporate in her arms. She and Mikoto then battle, while Mikoto flashes back to how her brother is the Obsidian Lord.
| 21 | "The Obsidian Prince Awakens"; Transliteration: "Kuroki Kimi, Mezameru Toki" (Japanese: 黒き君、目覚めるとき) | February 24, 2005 |
Nao attacks Natsuki, and Shizuru Fujino reveals herself to be a HiME while saving Natsuki. We also find out that Reito is the Obsidian Prince. Meanwhile, Mashiro and Fumi go to confront the Obsidian Prince, who turns out to be Reito. Mikoto fights for Reito and defeats Mashiro and Fumi.
| 22 | "Collapse"; Transliteration: "Kuzureyuku" (Japanese: くずれゆく......) | March 3, 2005 |
A large portion of the students are missing after the last battle. Haruka and Yukino look for Shizuru, and find her with Natsuki. Mai goes in search of the Obsidian Prince to learn if killing the other HiME's Children will give her the power to bring back Takumi.
| 23 | "Love and Friendship, Heartlessness"; Transliteration: "Aijō to Yūjō, Hijō" (Japanese: 愛情と友情、非情) | March 10, 2005 |
Midori wakes up Miyu with the key given to her by Mashiro. Mikoto tries to stop her, and Mai learns that Mikoto works for Reito now. Meanwhile, Shizuru defeats Yukino and Haruka evaporates. Yuuichi learns from Natsuki that Mai has feelings for him and goes in search of her.
| 24 | "Love is a Battle"; Transliteration: "Koi wa Tatakai" (Japanese: コイ·ハ·タタカイ) | March 17, 2005 |
Shizuru destroys Nao's Child, killing Nao's hospitalized mother. Shiho turns out to be the mysterious flute-playing HiME and attacks Mai. Mikoto kills Shiho's Child, and Yuuichi evaporates as Mai tries to explain that she loves him.
| 25 | "The Moment of Destiny"; Transliteration: "Unmei no Koku e" (Japanese: 運命の刻へ) | March 24, 2005 |
Shizuru and Natsuki battle and then both evaporate as each is the other's most precious person. Miyu goes to kill the Obsidian Prince. Mai goes after the Obsidian Prince as well, but Mikoto shows up to stop her with her Child.
| 26 | "Shining ☆ Days" (Japanese: Shining ☆ Days) | March 31, 2005 |
Miyu wakes up Mashiro from a frozen block of ice. Mashiro then revives all the people who had evaporated. Yuuichi comes to rescue Mai and Mikoto defeats Reito. The Obsidian Prince is revealed in true form later defeated by Kagutsuchi and everything returns to normal. Reito and Yuuichi want Mai, and Mikoto does not want to share.
