= Bandai Namco Filmworks =

Japanese entertainment company

Bandai Namco Filmworks Inc.

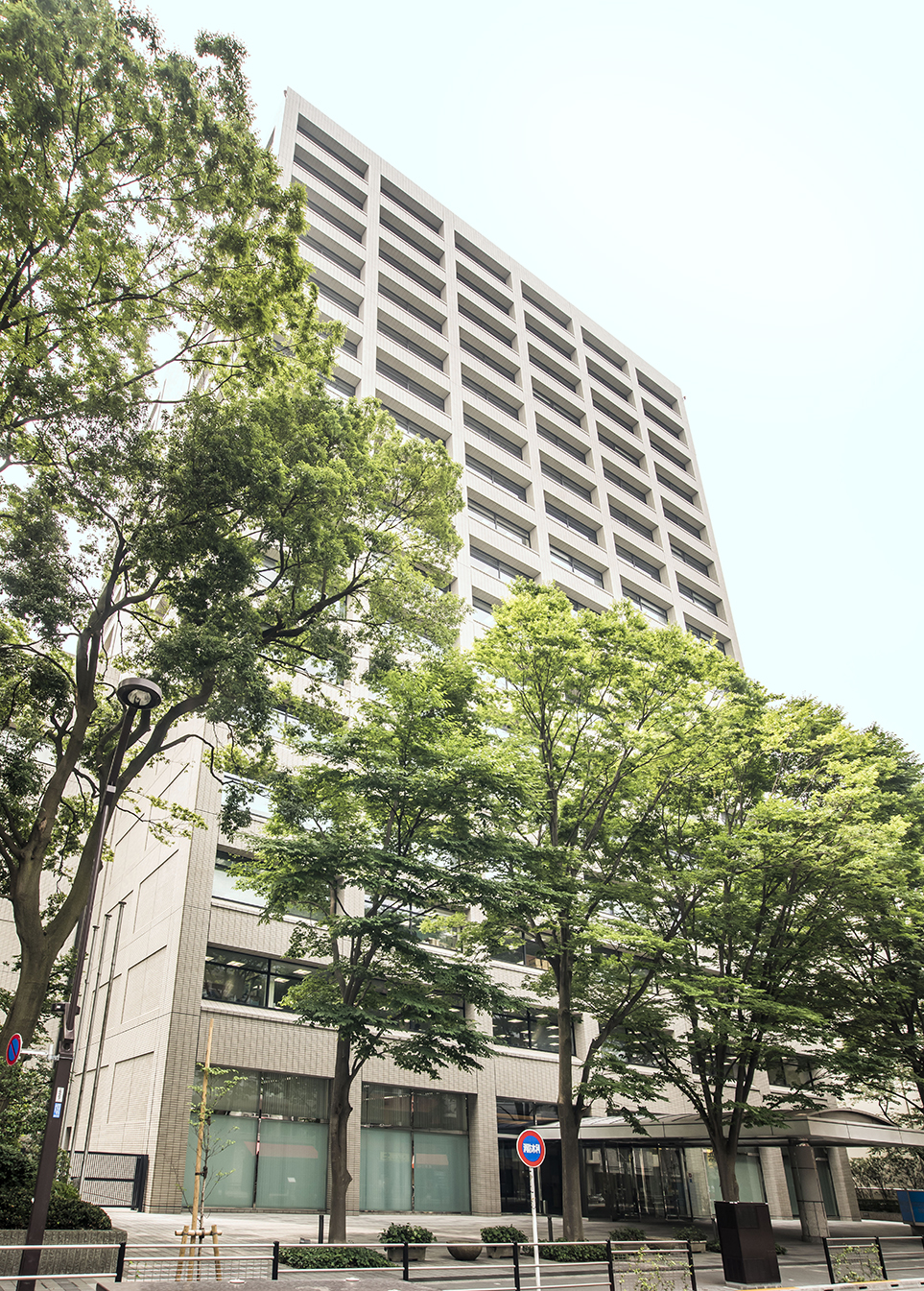
- Headquarters in Suginami, Tokyo
- Native name: 株式会社バンダイナムコフィルムワークス
- Romanized name: Kabushiki gaisha Bandai Namuko Firumuwākusu
- Formerly: Sunrise Studio, Limited (1972–1976); Nippon Sunrise Inc. (1976–1987); Sunrise Inc. (1987–2022)
- Type: Subsidiary
- Industry: Anime; Film distribution Home entertainment Character licensing
- Predecessors: Bandai Namco Arts (anime/live-action production and home video division); Bandai Namco Rights Management
- Founded: September 1972; 54 years ago (as Sunrise); April 1, 2022; 4 years ago (as Bandai Namco Filmworks)
- Headquarters: Ogikubo, Suginami, Tokyo, Japan
- Key people: Makoto Asanuma (Chairman and CEO); Satoshi Kono (President and CEO)
- Number of employees: 770 (as of April 1, 2026)
- Parent: Bandai Namco Holdings
- Divisions: Sunrise (IP Production Group); Bandai Visual/Emotion; Bandai Channel
- Subsidiaries: Bandai Namco Pictures; Actas; Eight Bit; Sotsu; Echoes; Bandai Namco Filmworks America; Sunrise (Shanghai)
- Website: bnfw.co.jp

Bandai Namco Filmworks Inc. (Note: Japanese: 株式会社バンダイナムコフィルムワークス, Hepburn: Kabushiki gaisha Bandai Namuko Firumuwākusu; BNF) is a Japanese entertainment company owned by Bandai Namco Holdings with its business focused on the planning, production, distribution, and management of anime and live-action films and television series, as well as character licensing. It was founded in September 1972 by former Mushi Production staff as Sunrise Studio, Limited, (Note: 有限会社サンライズスタジオ, Yugen-kaisha Sanraizu Sutajio) the animation studio branch of Shoeisha Co., Ltd. (Note: 株式会社創映社, Kabushiki-gaisha Shoeisha) In 1977, it gained independence from Shoeisha and Tohokushinsha and rebranded itself to Nippon Sunrise Inc. (Note: 株式会社日本サンライズ, Kabushiki-gaisha Nihon Sanraizu) In 1987, the studio rebranded to Sunrise Inc., (Note: 株式会社サンライズ, Kabushiki-gaisha Sanraizu) a name that would remain in use for over 35 years. In 1994, the company was acquired by toy and entertainment company Bandai and was integrated into Namco Bandai Holdings in 2005.

In 2022, as part of a major group restructuring of the Bandai Namco Group, the company would merge with the home video division of Bandai Namco Arts and Bandai Namco Rights Marketing to form Bandai Namco Filmworks. As part of this restructuring, Sunrise would continue to operate as a division within the company (officially known as a "brand") with the changes taking effect on April 1, 2022.

Its current divisions include Sunrise (animation production), Bandai Visual (including its Emotion label, home video distribution), and Bandai Channel (streaming services) and currently owns other studios, such as BN Pictures, Actas, Eight Bit, the advertising agency Sotsu and the manga production company Echoes. It also holds international subsidiaries such as Bandai Namco Filmworks America, which handles distribution, licensing and marketing

== History ==
From its establishment in 1972 until 2022, the company served as the legal operating entity for the Sunrise studio, acting as a full production company specializing in animation production and character licensing.

On April 1, 2022, Bandai Namco Holdings adopted a new logo that had been initially revealed in October 2021. As a result, a major restructuring occurred, with Sunrise Inc. subsuming the anime and home video division of Bandai Namco Arts, which was dissolved that same day and rebranded to Bandai Namco Music Live with its music division, Sunrise Music being subsumed into Bandai Namco Arts' music operations, including Lantis in the process. Following this, the company adopted the same logo as its parent, and took the name Bandai Namco Filmworks. As of August 2023, the Sunrise name has been kept as one of the major brands of the company as an animation production division.

On March 1, 2024, Bandai Namco Filmworks announced the acquisition of anime studio Eight Bit, making it a wholly owned subsidiary.

On May 14, 2024, the company established a business partnership with animation studio Tsumugi Akita Animation Lab to jointly create further works and intellectual property (IP).

On June 3, 2024, the company entered into a business partnership with LandQ Studios to strengthen further 3DCG animation production capabilities.

On February 4, 2025, Bandai Namco Holdings USA announced the establishment of Bandai Namco Filmworks America to handle the company's licensing and brand management activities within the Americas, which will take effect on April 1. The announcement coincided with the start of the co-financing and co-production of the Gundam film with Legendary Pictures.

On October 7, 2025, it was announced that the company would streamline its planning, production, and copyright management businesses as well as management of the Gundam series, that are currently overlapped within BNF and its subsidiary, Sotsu. As part of this, Sotsu would transfer its Gundam series-related businesses and its IP planning and production businesses to BNFW with the transfer being completed by April 1, 2026.

In November 2025, Bandai Namco Filmworks announced a new "human resource strategy" for 2025–2027 in which it would train creators at its in-house animation schools, like "Sunrise Drawing School" and the "Sunrise Art School", to help combat Japan's shortage of animators.

== Main divisions ==
=== Sunrise ===
Sunrise (Note: サンライズ, Sanraizu), also known as Sunrise Studios, the trade name of the company's IP Production Group division, is an animation studio founded in September 1972 and is based in Ogikubo, Tokyo. Its former names were also Soeisha, Sunrise Studio and Nippon Sunrise.

The studio is renowned for critically praised and popular original anime series such as the Gundam series, Cowboy Bebop, Space Runaway Ideon, Armored Trooper Votoms, The Big O, the Mashin Hero Wataru series, Yoroiden Samurai Troopers, the Future GPX Cyber Formula series, Crush Gear Turbo, The Vision of Escaflowne, the Love Live! series, Witch Hunter Robin, My-HiME, My-Otome, the Code Geass series, and Cross Ange: Rondo of Angel and Dragon, as well as its numerous adaptations of acclaimed light novels including Crest of the Stars, Dirty Pair, Horizon in the Middle of Nowhere and Accel World, and manga such as the City Hunter series, Inuyasha, Yashahime, Outlaw Star, Angel Links, Yakitate!! Japan, Planetes, and Kekkaishi. Their productions usually feature fluid animation and action sequences and many fans refer to the quality of their work as "Sunrise Smooth".

Most of their work are original titles created in-house by their creative staff under a collective pseudonym, Hajime Yatate. They also operated a defunct video-game studio, Sunrise Interactive. Sunrise launched a light-novel publisher, Yatate Bunko Imprint, on September 30, 2016, to publish original titles and supplement their existing franchises with new materials.

=== Bandai Visual ===
Bandai Visual (Note: バンダイビジュアル, Bandai Bijuaru) alongside its Emotion (Note: エモーション, Emōshon; stylized in all caps) brand is the home video division of Bandai Namco Filmworks. The label focuses on releasing video content for most of its works from the Sunrise brand alongside works from other companies. Prior to 2015, Bandai Visual operated as a separate company within BNHD with the company absorbing Lantis that year and changing its name to Bandai Namco Arts. This changed when Bandai Namco's 2022 restructuring moved the video division of Bandai Namco Arts to Bandai Namco Filmworks and Bandai Namco Arts rebranding itself to Bandai Namco Music Live.

=== Bandai Channel ===
Bandai Channel (Note: バンダイチャンネル, Bandai chaneru) serves as the video distribution service of the group that hosts mainly anime works through the internet via its titular streaming service which is available only in Japan. The service hosts content from the BNFW libraries as well as other studios and distributors.
