= Crush Gear Turbo =

Japanese anime television series

- Logo from the opening of Crush Gear Turbo

クラッシュギア (Kurasshugia)
- Created by: Hajime Yatate
- Anime television series
- Directed by: Shūji Iuchi
- Produced by: Naotake Furusato; Shun Hiraguchi; Hirokazu Honmyo
- Written by: Fuyunori Gobu; Hiroaki Kitajima
- Music by: Kenichi Sudo; Yogo Kono; JAM Project
- Studio: Sunrise
- Original network: ANN (Nagoya TV, TV Asahi)
- Original run: October 7, 2001 – January 26, 2003
- Episodes: 68
- Manga
- Written by: Hisashi Matsumoto
- Published by: Kodansha
- Magazine: Comic BomBom
- Original run: October 2001 – January 2003
- Volumes: 4
- Anime film

Crush Gear Turbo the Movie: Kaiservern's Ultimate Challenge
- Directed by: Nobuhiro Kondo
- Written by: Hiroaki Kitajima
- Music by: Kenichi Sudo; Yogo Kono; JAM Project
- Studio: Sunrise
- Released: July 20, 2002
- Anime television series

Crush Gear Nitro
- Directed by: Tetsurō Amino
- Written by: Ryōta Yamaguchi
- Music by: Takayuki Negishi
- Studio: Sunrise
- Original network: ANN (Nagoya TV, TV Asahi)
- Original run: February 2, 2003 – January 25, 2004
- Episodes: 50
- icon

Crush Gear, known in Japan as Gekitou! Crush Gear Turbo (Japanese: 激闘!クラッシュギアTURBO, Hepburn: Gekitō! Kurasshugia Tābo), is a Japanese anime television series created by Sunrise. It aired from October 2001 to January 2003, with 68 episodes.

A standalone sequel titled Crush Gear Nitro (クラッシュギアNitro, Kurasshugia Naitoro) aired from February 2003 to January 2004.

== Premise ==
Crush Gear is a fictional sport where two pocket-sized cars called "Gears" go head-to-head in a match. The players are somehow able to drive the Gears at will which eliminates the need of RC control. The object is to either knock the opponent's Gear out of the arena, flip over the opponent's Gear in such a way that it does not get back on its wheels on time, or, controversially, shatter the opponent's gear to pieces. When not in a match, the Gears appear in traditional animation as with the series itself. But when the vehicles are in a match, the Gears appear in CGI.

Gekitou! Crush Gear Turbo tells the story of Kouya Marino, an eleven-year-old boy who is a member of the Tobita Club, a Japanese Crush Gear team led by his late older brother, Yuhya Marino—the Asian Cup champion who was qualified for the World Cup finals—, who died in a tragic accident four years ago. Kouya's skills are nowhere near his brother's, and is nearly disqualified when he arrived late at the clubhouse for an elimination match. Yuhya's former teammate, Takeshi Manganji quits the team and forms a club of his own, forcing the rest of the members to join his new group, the Manganji Club. As the Tobita Club is facing the threat of extinction, Kouya refuses to give up and comes to inherit a Crush Gear from his late brother, the Garuda Eagle. Kouya must find a way to reinstate the Tobita Club back to its former glory. With the help of his new teammates, he eventually develops his techniques in Gear Fighting and comes to feel that Crush Gear is an important friend, leading him to victory. By recognizing the same feelings in his opponent, he becomes friends even with his rival.

== Characters ==
=== Main characters ===
Kouya Marino (真理野 コウヤ, Marino Kōya)
Voiced by: Megumi Matsumoto
Gear: Garuda Eagle ⇒ Garuda Phoenix
The series' protagonist and the captain of the Tobita Club, Kouya is a young Gear Fighter who aims to be the number one in the world of Crush Gear.
Naotake Furusato, producer of Crush Gear Turbo, said that the creators "lost a lot of sleep over" trying to name the main character. Furusato credits director Shūji Iuchi with the final naming. The creators decided to use "Kouya" as the name "had a ring to it like brothers would have and that made it kind of realistic" and that the name literally means "wilderness" and "sounded right for a main character". Furusato added that the name "Kouya" made him want to see the character "grow up big and strong".
Jirou Oriza (織座 ジロウ, Oriza Jirō)
Voiced by: Masato Amada (Michael Shitanda)
Gear: Raging Bull ⇒ Raging Bullet
A Gear Fighter and member of the Tobita Club, Jirou is a former baseball pitcher who likes to eat red-bean buns. He is Kouya's closest teammate and friend. Jirou also has a crush on the team's deputy owner, Lilika.
Kyousuke Jin (迅 キョウスケ, Jin Kyōsuke)
Voiced by: Chika Sakamoto
Gear: Dino Spartan ⇒ Dino Phalanx
A Gear Fighter and member of the Tobita Club, Kyousuke is known as a genius Gear Master, a mechanic with superior skills in tuning, maintaining and customizing Crush Gears. He was Kuroudo's former teammate in Team Griffon.
Kuroudo Marume (丸目 クロウド, Marume Kurōdo)
Voiced by: Naomi Shindoh
Gear: Shooting Mirage ⇒ Shooting Phantom
A Gear Fighter and member of the Tobita Club, Kuroudo is a kendo swordsman with an excellent sense of hearing. He was Kyousuke's former teammate in Team Griffon.
Furusato said that Kuroudo's name originates from a samurai in the Edo period.
Kaoru Hanano (華野 カオル, Hanano Kaoru)
Voiced by: Akemi Kanda
Kouya's childhood friend and the manager of the Tobita Club team, Kaoru often provides information about various Gear Fighters to her teammates.
Takeshi Manganji (万願寺 タケシ, Manganji Takeshi)
Voiced by: Akira Sasanuma
Gear: Gaiki
The leader of the Manganji Club and Kouya's rival, Manganji is a powerful Gear Fighter who comes from a wealthy family that runs their own business company.
Furusato described the name "Manganji" as having "an image of wealth" – He added that "Japanese people are suckers for names that end in "ji"! (laughs)"
Lilika Tobita (飛田 リリカ, Tobita Ririka)
Voiced by: Michiko Neya
A key member of the Tobita Club serving as the team's deputy owner, Lilika is managing the group alongside Kaoru and is watching over the members.

=== Recurring characters ===
Yuhya Marino (真理野 ユウヤ, Marino Yūya)
Voiced by: Kenji Nojima
Gear: Garuda Eagle
A genius Gear Fighter and Kouya's deceased older brother, Yuhya was the late former captain of the Tobita Club and former champion of the Asia Cup tournament. Four years prior to the start of the series, he was killed in an unfortunate accident just before the final match of the World Cup tournament. Yuhya often appears in flashbacks.
Furusato said that Yuhya's name was decided on early in the production.
Marimo Marino (真理野 マリモ, Marino Marimo)
Voiced by: Chiharu Tezuka
Kouya and Yuhya's mother, who runs a café called La Mére du Marino.
Tateo Marino (真理野 タテオ, Marino Tateo)
Voiced by: Ken Narita
Kouya and Yuhya's father and Marimo's husband.
Gou Manganji (万願寺豪, Manganji Gō)
Voiced by: Hiroomi Sugino
Manganji's father, who is the president of the Manganji Group corporation.
Shinnosuke Gomano (胡麻野シンノスケ, Gomano Shin'nosuke)
Voiced by: Kanako Tateno
Manganji's loyal sidekick and a member of the Manganji Club.
Daikichi Momita (揉田ダイキチ, Momita Daikichi)
Voiced by: Mika Matsuoka
Manganji's loyal sidekick and a member of the Manganji Club.
Nobiru Koike (小池ノビル, Koike Nobiru)
Voiced by: Minako Tsutsu
Gear: Thunder Horn
A Gear Fighter and member of the Central Club, a team consisting of Gear Fighters from central Japan.
Chota Aida (相田チョータ, Aida Chōta)
Voiced by: Wasabi Mizuta
Gear: Hammer Willow
A Gear Fighter and member of the Central Club team.
Futoshi Harano (原野フトシ, Harano Futoshi)
Voiced by: Yasuhiro Takato
Gear: Shellnite
A Gear Fighter and member of the Central Club team.
Fuuko Nagidori (凪鳥フウコ, Nagidori Fūko)
Voiced by: Sanae Kobayashi
Shingo's younger sister and Kouya's classmate.
Shingo Nagidori (凪鳥シンゴ, Nagidori Shingo)
Voiced by: Tomohiro Tsuboi
Gear: Winning Dagger
A Gear Fighter and former member of the Tobita Club during Yuhya's generation, and Fuuko's older brother.
Burning Octopus (バーニングオクトパス, Bāninguokutopasu)
Voiced by: Sachi Matsumoto (as Tarou and Saburou), Reiko Takagi (as Jirou and Shirou)
Gear: Tentakol
A team of mischievous Gear Fighters from the Kansai region, consisting of quadruplet brothers Tarou Takoyama (多古山太郎, Takoyama Tarō), Jirou Takoyama (多古山次郎, Takoyama Jirō), Saburou Takoyama (多古山三郎, Takoyama Saburō), and Shirou Takoyama (多古山四郎, Takoyama Shirō).
Eddie Kobayashi (エディ小林, Edi Kobayashi)
Voiced by: Kousuke Okano
Gear: Break Nine
A snooker player and underground Gear Fighter who is a member of the Mighty Gears, a team by the Manganji Club consisting of Gear Fighters exceling in their own field in sports. Eddie is Kuroudo's rival.
Taki Hiroomi (滝ヒロオミ, Hiroomi Taki)
Voiced by: Yuu Asakawa
Gear: Aero Rider
A skateboarder and one of the Gear Fighters of the Mighty Gears team. Taki is Jirou's best friend and former baseball catcher.
Kishin Ōkawa (大川キシン, Ōkawa Kishin)
Voiced by: Makiko Ohmoto
Gear: Hishōkaku
An intelligent shogi (chess) player and one of the Gear Fighters of the Mighty Gears team. Kishin is Kyousuke's arch-nemesis.
Satoru Todoroki (轟サトル, Todoroki Satoru)
Voiced by: Shigeru Shibuya
Gear: Mach Turbo
A GPX kart racer and one of the Gear Fighters of the Mighty Gears team.
Ichidou Takekura (武蔵一道, Takekura Ichidō)
Voiced by: Minoru Inaba
A kendo master from Hokkaido.
Mitsuki Ohmori (大森 ミツキ, Ōmori Mitsuki)
Voiced by: Yumi Kakazu
Gear: Griffon Nova
A Gear Fighter and the captain of Team Griffon, who is a former teammate of Kuroudo and Kyousuke.
Kazuya Shishigawa (獅子川カズヤ, Shishigawa Kazuya)
Voiced by: Mika Matsuoka
Gear: Hard Stag
A Gear Fighter and member of Team Griffon.
Hiroshi Washida (鷲田ヒロシ, Washida Hiroshi)
Voiced by: Kanako Tateno
Gear: Hard Beat
A Gear Fighter and member of Team Griffon.
Sougen Manganji (万願寺宗玄, Manganji Sōgen)
Voiced by: Takkō Ishimori
Manganji's grandfather, who is a renowned calligrapher.
Kurosaki (黒崎, Kurosaki)
Voiced by: Daisuke Ishikawa
Manganji's trusted bodyguard.
Wang Hu (王虎, Wan Fū)
Voiced by: Sayaka Aida
Gear: Tigeraid
A cheerful, outgoing Gear Fighter and member of the Si Xing Hu Tuan, a team consisting of Chinese Gear Fighters. Wang Hu is Kouya's close friend and rival.
Lan Fang (蘭芳, Ranfang)
Voiced by: Akiko Nakagawa
Gear: Tiger Flare
A Gear Fighter and the only female member of the Si Xing Hu Tuan team, Lan Fang is Wang Hu's adoptive older sister and Kyousuke's love interest.
Ma Liang (馬良, Māryan)
Voiced by: Takehiro Murozono
Gear: Tiger Commander
A Gear Fighter and the captain of the Si Xing Hu Tuan team.
Li Chun (李春, Rīchun)
Voiced by: Kanako Tateno
Gear: Tiger Force
A Gear Fighter and member of the Si Xing Hu Tuan team.
Ming Wu (明呉, Min Ū)
Voiced by: Hidenari Ugaki
The antagonistic coach of the Si Xing Hu Tuan team and Wang Hu's adoptive father, Ming Wu is ambitious, radical, and manipulative.
Dan Midou (御堂 ダン, Midō Dan)
Voiced by: Hiroki Takahashi
Gear: Gougetsu Reishiki
A Gear Fighter and member of the Manganji Dreams, an elite team by the Manganji Club consisting of gifted Gear Fighters with special training from the Manganji Laboratory.
Rai Shinomiya (篠宮 ライ, Shinomiya Rai)
Voiced by: Takayuki Yamaguchi
Gear: Sougetsu
A Gear Fighter and member of the Manganji Dreams team, who is Rin's twin brother.
Rin Shinomiya (篠宮 リン, Shinomiya Rin)
Voiced by: Kanako Tateno
Gear: Shigetsu
A Gear Fighter and member of the Manganji Dreams team, who is Rai's twin sister.
Brad Fincher (ブラッド・フィンチャー, Buraddo Finchā)
Voiced by: Takako Honda
Gear: Stealth Jiraiya
A young Hollywood movie star and the arrogant Gear Fighter of the Star Brad team, who becomes Jirou's arch-nemesis.
Alex Borg (アレックス・ボーグ, Arekkusu Bōgu)
Voiced by: Hiroaki Ishikawa
Gear: Beo Fenrer
A Gear Fighter and former member of the Tobita Club during Yuhya's generation, and Jirou's mentor and old friend. Alex is also a Gear Master (mechanic) who was responsible for creating Garuda Eagle and Raging Bull.
Gallen Connellheim (ガレン・コンネルヘイム, Garen Kon'neruheimu)
Voiced by: Daisuke Hasegawa
Gear: Grifeed
A Gear Fighter and the captain of the Euro Griffon team, Gallen is a strict coach whose training methods pushes the team members too hard.
Gina Firestein (ジーナ・ファイアスティン, Jīna Faiasutein)
Voiced by: Akiko Nakagawa
The chairwoman of the Gear Fight Association (GFA).
Carlos Ferrein (カルロス・フェラン, Karurosu Ferran) / U-YA (ユーヤ, Yūya)
Voiced by: Omi Minami
Gear: Black Garuda Eagle
A mysterious Gear Fighter and member of Quo Vadis, a team consisting of Brazilian Gear Fighters. Carlos is the boy who was saved by Yuhya Marino before his death four years ago.
Takaya Tobita (飛田 タカヤ, Tobita Takaya)
Voiced by: Hitoshi Bifu
The coach of Quo Vadis team and Lilika's father. He was originally the founder and former coach of the Tobita Club during Yuhya's generation.
Shane Firestein (シェーン・ファイアスティン, Shēn Faiasutein)
Voiced by: Tetsuya Iwanaga
A 22-year-old Gear Master (mechanic) who befriended Kouya in San Francisco, and Kane's mentor. Unbeknownst to everyone else, Shane is Gina Firestein's older brother and the legendary Gear God.
Crusher Kane (クラッシャー・ケイン, Kurasshā Kein)
Voiced by: Ayaka Yamashita
Gear: Vort Grenade
A Gear Fighter who participated in Gear Pancratium, an illegal underground competition that shows the destruction of Crush Gears in battle.
Heinrich Gang (ハインリッヒ・ガンク, Hainrihhi Ganku)
Voiced by: Yōko Matsuoka
Gear: Blitz Vogel
A gifted Gear Fighter and former champion of the Europe Cup tournament, Heinrich was a former member of the Weiss Ritters, a team consisting of German Gear Fighters. Four years prior to the start of the series, he quit from Gear Fighting after his rival Yuhya Marino died in the day of the World Cup finals match.

=== Other characters ===
Taikan Mizumori (水守 タイカン, Mizumori Taikan)
Voiced by: Yōsuke Akimoto
The owner of a kendo dojo where Kuroudo attends.
Ryouichi Ebata (江畑リョウイチ, Ebata Ryōichi)
Voiced by: Hiroko Oyamada
Gear: Wild Stag
An arrogant member of the Manganji Club.
Q (キュー, Kyū)
A chimpanzee at the zoo where the father of Nagidori siblings works. Q knows how to play Gear Fighting.
Kouji Hanano (花野コウジ, Hanano Kōji)
Voiced by: Takeharu Onishi
Kaoru's uncle, who lives in Hokkaido.
God Voice (ゴッドボイス, Goddoboisu)
Voiced by: Kazuya Ichijō
The host of the Illusion Cup tournament.
Taka Shibuya (渋谷タカ, Shibuya Taka)
Voiced by: Jun Fukuyama
Gear: Dorikin
A Gear Fighter and member of Club 4649 (Yoroshiku).
Momo Yamanoki (山野木モモ, Yamanoki Momo)
Voiced by: Tomoko Kawakami
Gear: Cuty Tiger
A Gear Fighter and the captain of Pink Lips, an all-female team.
Koume Aida (愛田コウメ, Aida Kōme)
Voiced by: Kanako Tateno
Gear: Cuty Zebra
A Gear Fighter and member of the Pink Lips team.
Crush Mary (クラッシュ・メェリー, Kurasshu Merī)
Voiced by: Kanako Tateno
A female Crush Gear sportscaster.
GFA-kun (ジーファくん, Jīfa-kun)
Voiced by: Mika Matsuoka
The official mascot of the Gear Fight Association (GFA).
Kim Yong-dae (金 龍大, Kimu Yonde)
Voiced by: Sanae Kobayashi
Gear: Assault Panzer
A South Korean Gear Fighter and member of Team Kim, who is Yong-sun's younger brother.
Kim Yong-sun (金 龍乗, Kimu Yonsun)
Voiced by: Yasuyuki Kase
The coach of Team Kim and Yong-dae's older brother. Four years prior to the start of the series, Yong-sun was the opponent of Yuhya Marino in the finals of the Asia Cup tournament for 23 rounds.
Tomba Giriran (トンバ・ギリラン, Tonba Giriran)
Voiced by: Takayuki Fujimoto
Gear: Tradisi
A Singaporean Gear Fighter and member of Team Kemenangan.
Lennard Firestein (レナード・ファイアステイン, Renādo Faiasutein)
Voiced by: Hitoshi Bifu
The founder and former chairman of the Gear Fight Association (GFA), who is Shane and Gina's father.
Steve Douglas (スティーブ・ダグラス, Sutību Dagurasu)
Voiced by: Kanako Tateno
A member of the Star Brad team and Brad's friend.
Crush Gordon (クラッシュ・ゴードン, Kurasshu Gōdon)
Voiced by: Tomohiro Tsuboi
The host of the Crush Gear World Cup tournament.
Alberto Schweiger (アルベルト・シュバイガー, Aruberuto Shubaigā)
Voiced by: Showtaro Morikubo
Gear: Ein Horn
A Gear Fighter and member of the Weiss Ritters team.
Ralf Wenders (ラルフ・ヴェンダース, Rarufu Vendāsu)
Voiced by: Susumu Chiba
Gear: Jagd Horn
A Gear Fighter and member of the Weiss Ritters team.
Rudolf Steiner (ルドルフ・シュタイナー, Rudorufu Shutainā)
Voiced by: Takahiro Mizushima
Gear: Kugel Geist
A Gear Fighter and member of the Weiss Ritters team, who is Michael's older brother.
Michael Steiner (ミハエル・シュタイナー, Mihaeru Shutainā)
Voiced by: Asami Sanada
Gear: Sturm Winkel
A Gear Fighter and member of the Weiss Ritters team, who is Rudolf's younger brother.
Mohamed Ramzy (モハメド・ラムジー, Mohamedo Ramujī)
Voiced by: Masahito Yabe
Gear: King Pharaon
An Egyptian Gear Fighter and member of the Heliopolis team.
God Mama (ゴッドママ, Goddomama)
Voiced by: Tetsu Inada
The host of the illegal Gear Pancratium competition.
Richard Firestein (リチャード・ファイアステイン, Richādo Faiasutein)
Voiced by: Hiroshi Naka
An old mechanic who lives in the woods of Black Forest with a pet dog called Zeus. Richard is Shane and Gina's grandfather.
Nina Maier (ニナ・マイヤー, Nina Maiyā)
Voiced by: Rio Natsuki
Heinrich's personal maid.

=== Film-only characters ===
Jake Groundstein (ジェイク・グランドシュタイン, Jeiku Gurandoshutain) / Gear Emperor (ギア・エンペラー, Gia Enperā)
Voiced by: Jun Fukuyama
Gear: Kaiservern
Manganji's old friend and the son of the president of the Groundstein Group, a rival company of the Manganji Group. Jake is responsible for stealing the Kaiservern, the first Crush Gear created in the world.
Gear God (ギアゴッド, Gia Goddo)
Voiced by: Jūrōta Kosugi
A mysterious man at the GFA headquarters who holds a golden front weapon, Goldblade.

== Production ==
Planning for Crush Gear Turbo began in March 2001, with intent to begin airing in October 2001. Naotake Furusato, producer of Crush Gear Turbo, received a toy car prototype that used two AA batteries and a motor. The toy car operated in circles instead of straight lines, and operators could cause them to collide with one another. Furusato used this concept to develop Crush Gear Turbo. According to Furusato the show was the first Sunrise production to "genuinely adopt the use of 3D graphics". Furusato added that the 3D rendering allowed the animators to "brilliantly express the stage presence of the Gear Fights" and incorporate effects not in real-life toy gears such as fireworks and smoke. According to Furusato 3D Production Chief Mitsuo Fukuda (福田 己津央, Fukuda Mitsuo) told Furusato that, because there are some elements that may only be expressed in 3D, the series ought to use 3D "to full effect". Furusato concluded that this caused the battle scenes to appear "a little bit unique". Furusato credited the customization and element attributes in each gear to Sunrise's "already well-established know-how". In addition the producer credited his own experience on Gear Fighter Dendoh and director Shūji Iuchi's experience on Mashin Hero Wataru in the formation of Crush Gear Turbo.

Furusato intended for the creators of the series to "encourage children to think and place on value on things like friendship and trust in others" and for the series to express deepening human relationships. He added that the series "got kind of a Heisei Era [1989-2019] "Kyojin no Hoshi" and "Ashita no Joe" feeling to it" and that the current generation of children "are fundamentally a more cheerful lot and go in for a bit of a slapstick flavor".

== Media ==
=== Anime ===
Gekitou! Crush Gear Turbo, directed by Shūji Iuchi and produced by Sunrise's internal "Studio 10" division alongside Tokyu Agency, premiered in Japan on October 7, 2001, and concluded on January 26, 2003, after 68 episodes on Nagoya TV and TV Asahi. Atsuo Tobe is the character designer for the anime series, with Shinji Aramaki, Susumu Imaishi and Mitsuru Owa as the mechanical art designers. The musical score is composed by Kenichi Sudo and Yogo Kono. The series features two pieces of theme music and one insert song, all performed by JAM Project: the opening theme is "Crush Gear Fight!!", and the ending theme is "Ai dayone!! -Gear wo Tsunagou-" (愛だよねっ!! ～ギアをつなごう～, lit. 'It's Love!! ~Let's Connect Gears~'), while the insert theme is "Kaze no Eagle" (風のEAGLE, lit. 'Wind Eagle') featuring Hironobu Kageyama. A Filipino dub of the series premiered on ABS-CBN in the Philippines on April 21, 2003.

==== Film ====
Crush Gear Turbo the Movie: Kaiservern's Ultimate Challenge (激闘！クラッシュギアTURBO カイザバーンの挑戦, Gekitō! Kurasshugia Tābo Kaizabān no Chōsen) is a 20-minute short film that was released in Japan on July 20, 2002, as part of Toei Animation Summer 2002 Animation Fair. In this movie, Kouya and Manganji team up against a Gear Emperor who is controlling the world's first gear, Kaiservern. JAM Project performed two pieces of theme music: the insert song is "Get Up Crush Fighter!", and the ending theme is "Alright now! (Movie Re-mix ver.)" featuring Rika Matsumoto.

=== Manga ===
The manga adaptation is illustrated by Hisashi Matsumoto. The manga version featured original elements and unique developments, and the Gear Fighting is slightly more realistic than in the anime. It was serialized in Kodansha's magazine, Comic BomBom from October 2001 to January 2003, and released in tankōbon (book) format in four volumes from February 2002 to March 2003. The manga also included three bonus chapters.

The English-language version was licensed in Singapore by Chuang Yi.

==== Volume list ====
| No. | Release date | ISBN |
|---|---|---|
| 1 | February 4, 2002 | 978-4-06-323938-6 |
| 2 | June 4, 2002 | 978-4-06-323946-1 |
| 3 | November 2, 2002 | 978-4-06-323960-7 |
| 4 | March 4, 2003 | 978-4-06-323967-6 |

=== Video games ===
Two video games have been produced based on the series, both published by Bandai and released only in Japan. The PlayStation version of Gekitou! Crush Gear Turbo was first released on July 25, 2002. Gekitou! Crush Gear Turbo: Gear Champion League was released for WonderSwan Color on August 10, 2002.

=== DVD release ===
In Australia, the English dub of Crush Gear Turbo was released by Magna Pacific. Volumes one and two of the series were released on July 1, 2004; volumes three and four were released on September 8, 2004; volume five was released on October 6, 2004; volume six was released on November 10, 2004; and volume seven was released on January 19, 2005.
