= Masakazu Obara =

Japanese anime director

Masakazu Obara (小原 正和, Obara Masakazu) is a Japanese anime director. He worked as a storyboarder for the 1998 anime series Outlaw Star.

== Filmography ==
=== Anime television series ===
- My-HiME (2004)
- My-Otome (2005)
- My-Otome Zwei (2006)
- The Girl Who Leapt Through Space (2009)
- Accel World (2012)

=== Anime films ===
- Accel World: Infinite Burst (2016)
