= My-Otome 0: S.ifr =

Japanese original video animation series

- Episode 1 DVD cover

舞-乙HiME 0~S.ifr~ (Mai-Otome 0 Shifuru)
- Genre: Action, Drama Magical girl
- Original video animation
- Directed by: Hirokazu Hisayuki
- Written by: Tatsuto Higuchi
- Music by: Kuniaki Haishima
- Studio: Sunrise
- Licensed by: NA: Crunchyroll
- Released: February 22, 2008 – November 21, 2008
- Episodes: 3

My-Otome 0: S.ifr (舞-乙HiME 0~S.ifr~, Mai-Otome 0 Shifuru) is a 2008 anime OVA produced by Sunrise and directed by Hisayuki Hirokazu, the former My-Otome character designer. It was developed as a prequel to the other My-Otome anime of the time. The peculiar name "0~S.ifr~" relates to the number zero.

"Sifr" (صفر) is the Arabic word for the number 0 (zero), also the origin for the word "cipher". It is also the name of a main character, Sifr Fran.

In the promotional teaser trailer for My-Otome 0, included in episode 4 of the My-Otome Zwei OVA, the title was written as My-Otome S.ifl (舞-乙HiME S.ifl). However, the spelling "S.ifr" is consistent in all other sources.

This is the prequel of My-Otome, whose events predate those of the My-Otome series. In this series, it focuses upon the origins of Lena Sayers, the mother of Arika Yumemiya and former bearer of Lofty Crimson Jade/Blue Sky Sapphire GEM, and Sifr Fran, the biological mother of Nina Wáng and the former queen of Windbloom Kingdom, as well as the origins of Schwartz, Aswad, and the Garderobe Academy and its Five Columns. The kidnapping of Sifr and the powerful revelation of Lena's GEM fatefully determine the outcome of the future for themselves and the others around them.

In contrast to all previous shows from the Mai metaseries, the music for S.ifr was the first of the Mai series to not be written by Yuki Kajiura. Instead, the music is provided by Kuniaki Haishima.

In July 2010, Bandai Entertainment announced that they had licensed the series. At Otakon 2013, Funimation Entertainment had announced that they have rescued My-Otome 0: S.ifr, along with a handful of other former BEI titles. They also announced at the 2017 New York Comic Con that they will release My-HiMe, My-Otome, and a My-Otome Zwei + My-Otome 0: S.ifr pack, all on Blu-Ray + DVD combo packs on January 8, 2018. They started pre-orders on October 15, 2017.

== Characters ==
- Sifr Fran (シフル・フラン, Shifuru Furan): Future queen of Windbloom and mother of Nina Wáng. Una Shamrock, the Headmaster of Garderobe, wanted her to be assassinated upon being captured by Schwartz because of her power as a Weaver. (Voiced by: Ami Koshimizu)
- Lena Sayers (レナ・セイヤーズ, Rena Seiyāzu): Meister Otome (Lofty Crimson Jade/Blue Sky Sapphire) and mother of Arika Yumemiya. Uses the alias "Lena Yumemiya". She bears a HIME-like mark on her chest, which makes her a true HIME, so she has manifested a true child and element Artemis. On top of that, she is a family member of the Searrs Family, which gives Miyu reason to protect her as inheritor of Alyssa's bloodline. She has manifested a set of golden wings, similar to Miyu's visions of her ancestor, Alyssa Searrs. She has broken more than one GEM due to power overload. (Voiced by: Aya Endo)
- Bruce Windbloom (ブルース・ヴィントブルーム, Burūsu Vintoburūmu)/Bruce Blan de Windbloom II, King of Windbloom. Uses the alias "Bruce Wallece (ブルース・ワレス, Burūsu Waresu)". (Voiced by: Ryotaro Okiayu)
- Raquel Major (ラケル・マヨール, Rakeru Mayōro): Meister Otome (Bound Dragons Rhodonite) serving Sister Zion.(Voiced by: Minori Chihara)
- Zion Margaret (シオン・マーガレット, Shion Māgaretto): Sister Zion (シスター・シオン), Raquel's master and a traveling priestess. (Voiced by: Eri Kitamura)
- Elliot Chandler (エリオット・チャンドラー, Eriotto Chandorā): Meister Otome (GalacticaMarine), Column I. Lena's good friend, also graduated the same year from the Otome Academy. She has a not-so-secret attraction toward Lena. (Voiced by: Yūko Sanpei)
- Shiro (シロー, Shirō): A young biologist researching desert species. He rescued Lena after her fight with M-9. Lives in the village of Oswald. Believed to be the father of Arika Yumemiya in the anime.(Voiced by: Souichiro Hoshi)
- Reito (レイト): Shiro's younger brother. (Voiced by: Akiko Kimura)
- Miyu (ミユ): An android who has been protecting Lena. She has set out to destroy her sister android, M-9. (Voiced by: Asai Kiyomi)
- John Smith (ジョン・スミス, Jon Sumisu): The public figure of Schwartz. (Voiced by: Osamu Saka)
- Kid (キッド): The future John Smith. (Voiced by: Tetsuya Kakihara)
- Una Shamrock (ウーナ・シャムロック, Ūna Shamrock): Headmistress of Garderobe, Meister Otome (Bewitching Smile Amethyst), Column II. She has some suspicions and doubts about Schwartz's activities and Sifr's mysterious origins. Hence, she gives Eliot Chandler an order of assassination upon Sifr, but only under extreme circumstances as a last resort. Una is shown at the end of the series leaving Garderobe Academy; Maria Graceburt states that she has been removed from the Headmistress position by the Galderobe Council. Una might be the possible mother or grandmother of Meister Otome Shizuru Viola. (Voiced by: Houko Kuwashima)
- M-9: Miyu-9, an android found by Schwartz. She reacted to the blood of Sifr Fran, and defeated Lena Sayers with extraordinary power that exceeds the Otomes. M-9, stated by Miyu, has the battle power of Shinso Fumi, which explains why she is so powerful. MIYU also referred to M-9 as her 'sister', so she may also be a product of the Searrs Foundation. She has the ability to upgrade after fights to become stronger, and using the opponent's abilities. (Voiced by: Yuka Iguchi)
- Rei Juckernaut 「レイ ジャガーノート」, Column III (Intensely Playing Peridot – 奏凛の橄欖石)
- Irma van de Velde 「イルマ バンデベルド」, Column V (Ice Silver Crystal – 氷雪の銀水晶)
- Kyoko Tsumabuki 「キョウコ シマブキ」, Column IV (Whirlwind Rose Quartz – 旋風の紅水晶)
- Sakura Hazakura (ハザクラ・サクラ, Hazakura Sakura): Meister Otome. Her master is Archduke Bel Glan Artai. In this era Artai is in an alliance with Taiyuan and as a result, they have switched Otomes. So Artai has Sakura as Otome, who is a princess from Taiyuan. (Stormy Sakura Chrysoberyl – 桜嵐の金緑石) (Voiced by: Yukana)
- Archduke Bel Glan Artai: Bel Glan is a very lewd man and has 6 wives, fathering above 10 children. After his death, Artai enters a state of disorder. Is aparence suggest that he may be the biological father of the future Queen Mashiro.
- Maria Graceburt (マリア・グレイスバート, Maria Gureisubāto): Meister Otome (Eternal Recurrence Jasper – 久遠の碧玉).

== Episodes ==
1. You'll Die If You Look Away (よそ見してると死にますよ, Yosomishiteru to Shinimasu yo)
2. Princess and Maiden (ヒメとヲトメ, Hime to Otome)
3. I Want to Live (わたしは生きたいのよ, Watashi wa ikitai no yo)

== Theme Songs ==
- "Finality Blue" by Minami Kuribayashi (Episode 1)
- "Heart All Green" by Minami Kuribayashi (Episode 2)
- "Koko ni Atta ne" (ここにあったね) by Minami Kuribayashi (Episode 3)
