= My-Otome Zwei =

2006 original video animation

- Cover of My-Otome Zwei Volume 1

舞-乙HiME Zwei
- Original video animation
- Directed by: Masakazu Obara
- Written by: Hiroyuki Yoshino
- Music by: Yuki Kajiura
- Studio: Sunrise
- Licensed by: NA: Crunchyroll
- Released: November 24, 2006 – August 24, 2007
- Episodes: 4

My-Otome Zwei (舞-乙HiME Zwei) is a Japanese OVA anime series, created by Sunrise. Directed by Masakazu Obara and written by Hiroyuki Yoshino, it consists of four episodes, which were released across three-month intervals and is the sequel to the original My-Otome anime series. It is published in Japan by Bandai Visual and North America initially by Bandai Entertainment. At Otakon 2013, Funimation Entertainment had announced that they have rescued My-Otome Zwei, along with a handful of other former BEI titles. They also announced at the 2017 New York Comic Con that they will release My-HiMe, My-Otome, and a My-Otome Zwei + My-Otome 0: S.ifr pack, all on Blu-Ray + DVD combo packs on January 8, 2018. They will start pre-orders on October 15, 2017.

Similar to its predecessors My-HiME and My-Otome, the title is a pun, which derives from the visual similarity of the Latin letter "Z" (from the German word zwei "two") to the kanji "乙", the first of the two characters in the word 乙女 otome "maiden". On the logo, the two similar glyphs are shown superimposed on one another.

== Plot ==
My-Otome Zwei takes place one year after the events of My-Otome. Arika is now a full-fledged Otome (though still under the tutelage of Miss Maria as she has not yet received enough credits to graduate) and Nagi is incarcerated in a prison somewhere in Aries. The various nations are at peace with one another and plan to hold S.O.L.T. (Strategic Otome Limitation Talks) to discuss limiting the numbers of Otome.

A mission to destroy a meteor threatening to collide with Earl sets into motion a chain of events which result in a mysterious shadowy figure attacking Garderobe and several Otome as well as a new, more powerful version of Slave appearing across the planet. To make matters worse, Queen Mashiro disappears following an argument with Arika. The series follows Arika's search for Mashiro as well as Garderobe's attempts to uncover the truth behind the shadowy figure.

== Release information ==
Each release is available in two versions; a standard edition containing only the 30-minute episode on DVD and a limited edition Special Package.

Each Volume's Special Package contains:

- A DVD containing the 30-minute episode
- A 3-track music CD containing the episode's ending song, its off vocal version and an audio commentary (Volume 4 had a drama track of My-HiME★DESTINY instead of the audio commentary)
- A figurine (Volume 1: Mini Mikoto cat, Volume 2: Meister Arika, Volume 3: Blue Sky Robe Arika and Volume 4: Neptune Robe Nina)
- A picture label

The Volume 1 Special Package also included an illustration book.

The first volume was released November 24, 2006, the second volume was released February 23, 2007, the third volume was released May 25, 2007, and the fourth and final volume was released August 24, 2007.

== Theme songs ==
Ending themes

- Believe ~Eien no Kizuna~ (Believe ~永遠の絆~) by Mika Kikuchi (Episode 1)
- Storm by Ami Koshimizu (Episode 2)
- Egao no Iro wa Niji no Iro (笑顔の色は虹の色) by Yukana (Episode 3)
- Otome wa DO MY BEST desho? 2007Ver. (乙女はDO MY BESTでしょ? 2007Ver.) by Mika Kikuchi, Ami Koshimizu, Yukana, Mai Nakahara, Saeko Chiba and Ai Shimizu (Episode 4)

== Manga ==
In 2007, My-Otome Zwei was serialized as a single-volume manga in Champion RED. The art was done by Chako Abeno. Having nothing to do with the original My-Otome manga, it followed the storyline of the OVA at first but later diverged.

== See also ==
- My-HiME
- My-Otome
- My-Otome 0: S.ifr
