= Future GPX Cyber Formula =

Japanese anime television series

- 新世紀GPX(フューチャーグランプリ)サイバーフォーミュラ
- Created by: Hajime Yatate
- Directed by: Mitsuo Fukuda
- Series composition: Hiroyuki Hoshiyama
- Character designers: Mutsumi Inomata (original character designs); Takahiro Yoshimatsu
- Machine designer: Shōji Kawamori (Studio Nue)
- Music by: Kow Otani
- Opening themes: "I'll Come"; by G-Grip
- Ending themes: "Winners"; by G-Grip
- Country of origin: Japan
- Original language: Japanese
- No. of episodes: 37 + SP (list of episodes)

Production
- Producers: Hibiki Itō (NTV); Shin'ichirō Maeda (NTV); Yuko Sagawa (Asatsu); Yōichi Ikeda (Sunrise)
- Planning and production: Nippon Television
- Production companies: Asatsu; Sunrise

Original release
- Network: NTV
- Release: March 15 – December 20, 1991

Related
Further information
Original video animation
Future GPX Cyber Formula 11
| Directed by | Mitsuo Fukuda |
| Music by | Kow Otani; Mari Onishi |
| Studio | Sunrise |
| Licensed by | SA/SEA: Medialink |
| Released | November 1, 1992 – June 1, 1993 |
| Runtime | 30 minutes (each) |
| Episodes | 6 |
Original video animation
Future GPX Cyber Formula ZERO
| Directed by | Mitsuo Fukuda |
| Music by | Kow Otani; Mari Onishi |
| Studio | Sunrise |
| Licensed by | SA/SEA: Medialink |
| Released | April 1, 1994 – February 1, 1995 |
| Runtime | 30 minutes (each) |
| Episodes | 8 |
Original video animation
Future GPX Cyber Formula SAGA
| Directed by | Mitsuo Fukuda |
| Music by | Toshihiko Sahashi |
| Studio | Sunrise |
| Licensed by | SA/SEA: Medialink |
| Released | August 1, 1996 – July 2, 1997 |
| Runtime | 30 minutes (each) |
| Episodes | 8 |
Original video animation
Future GPX Cyber Formula SIN
Original video animation
Future GPX Cyber Formula: Early Days Renewal
| Directed by | Mitsuo Fukuda |
| Written by | Mitsuo Fukuda |
| Music by | Kow Otani |
| Studio | Sunrise |
| Released | April 1, 1996 – June 1, 1996 |
| Runtime | 60 minutes (each) |
| Episodes | 2 |
Anime film
Future GPX Cyber Formula: Early Days Renewal - Movie Edition
| Directed by | Mitsuo Fukuda |
| Written by | Mitsuo Fukuda |
| Music by | Kow Otani |
| Studio | Sunrise |
| Released | February 19, 2027 |
Anime film
Future GPX Cyber Formula Asurada
| Directed by | Mitsuo Fukuda |
| Written by | Mitsuo Fukuda |
| Studio | Sunrise |
| Released | February 19, 2027 |

Future GPX Cyber Formula (Japanese: 新世紀GPX(フューチャーグランプリ)サイバーフォーミュラ, Hepburn: Fyūchā Guranpuri Saibā Fōmyura) is a Japanese futuristic motorsports anime television series produced by Asatsu and Sunrise. The series originally aired between March 15 and December 20, 1991, on Nippon Television and was later followed by four OVA (Original Video Animation) sequels respectively titled: Double One, Zero, Saga, and Sin. The series has also been adapted into multiple games, art-books, toys, audio dramas, and novels.

Outside of Japan, the series has aired in the Philippines by ABS-CBN for Hero TV, and in Italy on Italia 1. An English-subtitled DVD boxset of the TV series has also been released by Bandai Entertainment in North America in 2003. Medialink licensed the full series across Asia-Pacific in 2021.

== Summary ==
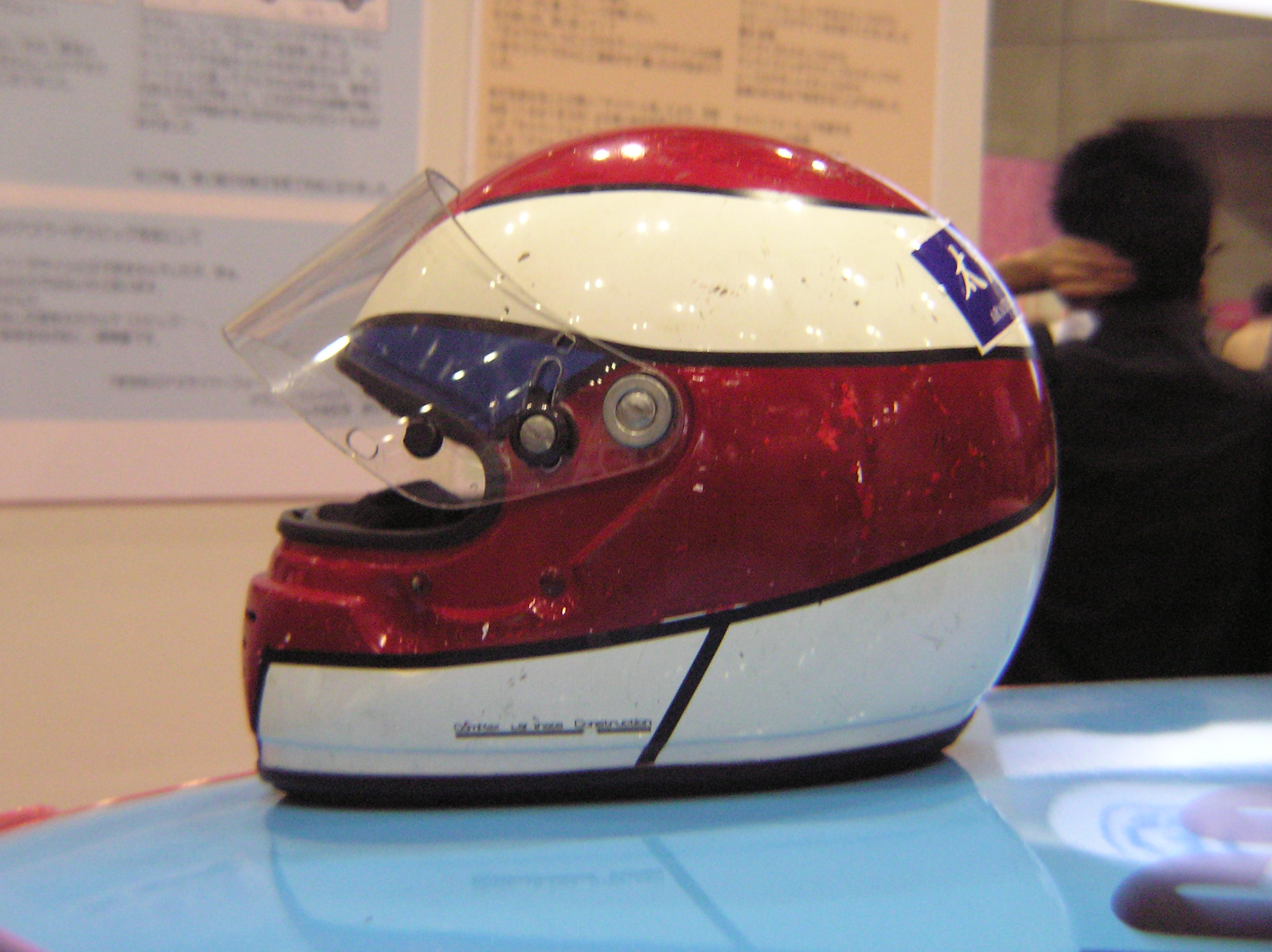
The replica helmet of protagonist Hayato Kazami (by Getwin).

A replica of the Ogre AN-21 featured in the OVA.

Some time in the near future, Cyber Formula, an automobile race in a different category from Formula One, is gaining popularity. It features cars equipped with pollution-free engines such as hydrogen engines and room-temperature superconducting motors, and artificial intelligence for navigation. A young driver, Hayato Kazami, is accidentally registered as a driver of Asurada, a Cyber Formula machine developed by his father. He enters the Cyber Formula Grand Prix, and in seasons one and two, a cycle of setbacks and triumphs present obstacles.

The TV series, which aired in 1991, is set in 2015, and the sequel OVAs 11 (Double One) through SAGA is set in the years 2016–2020, mainly from the perspective of Sugo Asurada (later Sugo Grand Prix and Sugo Winners), one of the teams competing in the 10th-15th Cyber Formula World Grand Prix, with Hayato as the main character.

The OVA SIN (Future GPX Cyber Formula SIN (新世紀GPXサイバーフォーミュラSIN, Fyūchā Guranpuri Saibā Fōmyura Shin)) is set in the 16th–17th Cyber Formula World Grand Prix in 2021–2022, and features Bleed Kaga (Jōtarō Kaga) as the main character in a fierce life-or-death struggle with Hayato, who has come to be known as the young emperor of the circuit.

Although non-canon, the 18th (2023) Cyber Formula tournament can be played in the game Future GPX Cyber Formula: Road to the Infinity 2 for PlayStation 2, and in Future GPX Cyber Formula: Road to the Infinity 3, in addition to the 18th tournament, the 19th (2024) tournament can be played in the Scenario Mode. Although the production staff of the original anime cooperated in the creation of these games, the publisher, Sunrise Interactive, has adopted the stance that these games are "non-canon sequels".

== Production ==
Future GPX Cyber Formula was produced by Sunrise, and was aired on early Friday mornings from March 15 to December 20, 1991, on Nippon TV. The series was Mitsuo Fukuda's directorial debut. When the project was first planned, it was largely intended for children, and the style was that cars with artificial intelligence would run through strange places in an obstacle race-like manner, clashing with each other along the way. It was planned to be like Speed Racer, and the races in the TV series were described as a triathlon of motor sports, as they were not only on circuits and city courses, but also on gravel surfaces and ice. However, the F1 boom led to a change to a full-fledged racing series. The futuristic car designs were done by Shōji Kawamori, known for his Valkyrie designs in the Macross series.

Red Company was involved in the production of the TV series, as it was with Mashin Hero Wataru, and the company's Chōji Yoshikawa was responsible for directing the series structure handled by Hiroyuki Hoshiyama. According to Yoshikawa, the sponsor, Takara, wanted to show races on Friday's broadcast and release the winning car as a toy on Saturday. However, Yoshikawa decided to limit the number of races to one per month, as car racing required more artistic ability than an average robot anime, and thus the number of races was limited to 10 per year. Who would win where, and the final standings were created first.

Jun'ichi Kanemaru was chosen to play the role of Hayato, the main character of the TV series, in his first starring role, but at the time of the audition, few anime had male voice actors playing 14-year-old boys, and since Mayumi Tanaka had played the role of Wataru, the main character in the previous show, Mashin Hero Wataru, it was assumed that Shinobu Adachi, another female voice actor, would also play the role of Hayato. However, there was a suggestion from within Sunrise to have Kanemaru, a male voice actor, participate in the tape audition, and although there were initial objections within the company, Kanemaru was ultimately selected through the audition.

== Media ==
The series aired on Nippon Television from March 15 to December 20, 1991.

=== OVA ===
Four sequel OVAs based on the TV series were produced. The first OVA, Future GPX Cyber Formula 11 (Double One), was released in 6 episodes between November 1, 1992, and June 1, 1993. The second, Future GPX Cyber Formula ZERO, was released in 8 episodes between April 1, 1994, and February 1, 1995. The third, Future GPX Cyber Formula SAGA, was released in 8 episodes between August 1, 1996, and July 2, 1997. The fourth and final OVA, Future GPX Cyber Formula SIN, was released in 5 episodes between December 21, 1998, and March 17, 2000.

An additional two-episode OVA, Future GPX Cyber Formula: Early Days Renewal, was released between April and June 1996. The OVA recaps the events of the TV series with new scenes and voice acting, as well as some story changes.

=== Short anime and compilation movie ===
On April 15, 2026, a promotional video for the series' 35th anniversary was posted on the series' official YouTube channel which ended with a fully-animated shot from an upcoming short anime project in the series. It was later revealed to be a double feature with a new remastered compilation film titled Future GPX Cyber Formula: Early Days Renewal - Movie Edition (Japanese: 『新世紀GPX(フューチャーグランプリ)サイバーフォーミュラ EARLYDAYS RENEWAL』 MOVIE EDITION, Hepburn: Fyūchā Guranpuri Saibā Fōmyura EARLYDAYS Rinyūaru: Mūbī Edishon) with the short film being titled Future GPX Cyber Formula: Asurada (Japanese: 新世紀GPX(フューチャーグランプリ)サイバーフォーミュラ ASURADA(アスラーダ), Hepburn: Fyūchā Guranpuri Saibā Fōmyura ASURADA) with the double feature being released in Japanese cinemas via Bandai Namco Filmworks on February 19, 2027.

=== Novels ===
A spinoff novel titled Future GPX Cyber Formula 1: Black Asurada (Japanese: 新世紀GPX(フューチャーグランプリ)サイバーフォーミュラ1 ブラックアスラーダ, Hepburn: Fyūchā Guranpuri Saibā Fōmyura 1 Burakku Asurāda) was published by Tairiku Shobo on July 1, 1992, written by the screenwriter of the TV series Toshirō Ōyama and illustrated by series character designer Takahiro Yoshimatsu. The novel depicts what happened after the first half of the TV series regarding Smith's plot against Asurada. A novel depicting Bleed Kaga's past, including the reason for the scar on his forehead, titled Future GPX Cyber Formula: Jaguar's Emblem (新世紀GPX(フューチャーグランプリ)サイバーフォーミュラ 黒豹(ジャガー)のエンブレム, Fyūchā Guranpuri Saibā Fōmyura Jagā no Enburemu) and written by series director Mitsuo Fukuda, was announced to be released by the same publisher in November 1992, but was cancelled due to Tairiku Shobo going bankrupt.

A novelization of the Saga arc of the OVA sequel series, written by Fukuda and illustrated by series original character designer Mutsumi Inomata, was published by Shogakukan on April 1, 1998. The novelization covers the first half of the story up to episode 4 of the 8-episode OVA, although there are differences in the depiction of some details. A sequel covering the second half of the OVA was supposed to be written, but it was never completed.

=== Video games ===
The series has been adapted into several video games, including an eponymous sugoroku game for the Game Boy (Barrier, February 28, 1992), an eponymous top-down racing game for the Super Famicom (Takara, March 19, 1992, released in North America as Cyber Spin), and a choice-based adventure game for the PlayStation titled Future GPX Cyber Formula: New Challenger (新世紀GPX(フューチャーグランプリ)サイバーフォーミュラ 新たなる挑戦者, Fyūchā Guranpuri Saibā Fōmyura Aratanaru Chōsensha) (VAP, March 18, 1999) where players take on the role of an original character, Seiichirō Shiba, a rookie driver, and enter a special race across the American continent called "Extreme Speed". The series has also been adapted into the Road to the Infinity series of real-time racing games published by Sunrise Interactive for the PlayStation 2, GameCube and PlayStation Portable between 2003–2008, and the Sin Cyber Grand Prix series of Sunrise-approved doujin PC games published by Project YNP between 2003–2018. Another video game in the series, titled Future GPX Cyber Formula: Spiral is in development.

== Staff ==
All series/arcs were animated by Sunrise and directed by Mitsuo Fukuda.

| Year | Title | Series composition | Character designer | Composer | No. of episodes |
|---|---|---|---|---|---|
| 1991 | Cyber Formula | Hiroyuki Hoshiyama | Mutsumi Inomata | Kow Otani | 37 |
| 1992 | Cyber Formula 11 | Hiroyuki Hoshiyama | Mutsumi Inomata | Kow Otani & Mari Onishi | 6 |
| 1994 | Cyber Formula ZERO | Takeshi Ashizawa | Mutsumi Inomata | Kow Otani & Mari Onishi | 8 |
| 1996 | Cyber Formula SAGA | Chiaki Morosawa | Hirokazu Hisayuki | Toshihiko Sahashi | 8 |
| 1998 | Cyber Formula SIN | Chiaki Morosawa | Hirokazu Hisayuki | Toshihiko Sahashi | 5 |

== Reception ==
The TV series won the Animage Anime Grand Prix in 1991.
