= My-Otome =

Japanese anime television series

- 舞-乙HiME
- Genre: Supernatural Magical girl
- Created by: Hajime Yatate
- Developed by: Hiroyuki Yoshino
- Directed by: Masakazu Obara
- Music by: Yuki Kajiura
- Country of origin: Japan
- Original language: Japanese
- No. of episodes: 26 + 10 specials (list of episodes)

Production
- Producers: Naotake Furusato; Hisanori Kurisaki
- Production companies: Sunrise; Bandai Visual

Original release
- Network: TV Tokyo, TVO, TVA
- Release: October 6, 2005 – March 30, 2006

Related
- Original video animation

My-Otome: The Holy Maiden's Prayer
- Studio: Sunrise
- Released: March 26, 2010
- Related works
- My-HiME; My-Otome Zwei; My-Otome 0: S.ifr; My-Otome (manga)

My-Otome (舞-乙HiME, Mai-Otome) is a Japanese anime television series produced by Sunrise. Directed by Masakazu Obara and written by Hiroyuki Yoshino, it is a spinoff of the My-HiME anime series and as such My-Otome takes place in a new setting with new main characters.

The series originally premiered on TV Tokyo from October 6, 2005, to March 30, 2006. An OVA sequel to the series, My-Otome Zwei, has been made and released in Japan, and a prequel, My-Otome 0: S.ifr, has been completed. The series was licensed for North American distribution by Bandai Entertainment. Zwei leaves the story open for future sequels, and Sifr for future prequels. At Otakon 2013, Funimation Entertainment had announced that they have rescued My-Otome, along with a handful of other former BEI titles. They also announced at the 2017 New York Comic Con that they will release My-HiMe, My-Otome, and the My-Otome Zwei + My-Otome 0: S.ifr pack, all as Blu-Ray + DVD combo packs on January 8, 2018. They will start pre-orders on October 15, 2017.

A new series was announced in June 2008, later announced as the My-HiME EXA manga.

== Story ==
My-Otome's story takes place in the distant future on the planet Earl, colonized by immigrants from Earth centuries ago. "Old technology" has survived in the form of nanomachines that allow female virgins to take the role of Meister Otomes - bodyguards, attendants and warriors that serve the royalty of various kingdoms.

Arika Yumemiya has come to Windbloom Kingdom in search of her mother, whom Arika knows was an Otome. On her arrival she meets the top Coral Otome student, Nina Wáng, and Windbloom's heir to the throne, Mashiro Blan de Windbloom. The series follows Arika's progress as a student at Garderobe Academy and the machinations of those desiring the destructive power of the old technology for themselves.

== Characters ==
- Arika Yumemiya

Arika is first introduced in the first episode where she travels through the desert to Windbloom to find out more information about her mother, whom she was told was an Otome. After seeing the power of the 3rd Column, Shizuru, she decides to follow her mother and become an Otome. She is sometimes nicknamed Anty (Arinko-chan in Japanese) because her name, Arika, could be "蟻か" in Japanese, which means ant. The way her head turns into an ant's head is a way to show how she feels when someone calls her this nickname (which must have followed her all her life). She is cheerful and optimistic, but lacks the sophistication and "common sense" to deal with the royalty (due to her being a country bumpkin). She quickly gets acquainted with the other Corals and Pearls in Garderobe and becomes good friends with most of them, mainly Nina Wáng and Erstin Ho, her roommates.

- Nina Wáng

Nina Wáng the top student in the Coral class and also one of Arika's roommates. She hails from Artai, a poorer kingdom than Windbloom with no Otome of its own. She and Nao are intended to fill this void and serve their country after graduating. Her father is Sergay Wáng, Nagi's right-hand man who is also part of the military. Arika found out that Nina was very sensitive to being tickled, which she enjoys exploiting. Nina is serious, determined and hard working because she wants to win the love of her adoptive father Sergay. Nina holds mixed feelings towards Arika. She is jealous of Arika's connections with Sergay and often annoyed with her cluelessness, but she shows friendship towards her on occasion. Nina's friend, Erstin Ho, was also her roommate who was in love with her.

- Mashiro Blan de Windbloom

In My-Otome, Mashiro Blan de Windbloom is the princess (and later Queen) of Windbloom. Her personality is completely opposite to her My-HiME incarnation. Rather than the polite, selfless and reserved attitude of the former, Mashiro Blan de Windbloom is boisterous, selfish, and arrogant. There are doubts on whether she is the true ruler - doubts which prove correct when the true ruler of Windbloom is discovered by Sergay Wáng. Mikoto the cat is her pet. She has a love-hate relationship with Nagi, leaning more towards the 'hate' end of the spectrum. It was never made clear in My-HiME what her true age was but in My-Otome it is explicitly said that she is 14 years old and later turns 15.

She first met Nina and Arika when she was evading her palace guards by attempting to jump to the next building's roof. When she fell the two rushed to her aid. Believing the guards to be kidnappers, they then helped her escape. Arika, who was raised in the country, was completely clueless as to Mashiro's arrogant attitude toward her, even when she showed them that she was the princess in which Nina apologized for their ignorance.

As time passed, Mashiro pushed the people around her harder and harder. She would repeatedly shirk her responsibilities as queen in order to visit Garderobe and laugh at Arika's clumsy attempts at Otome training. When the date of her birthday drew near, she increased the taxes to raise more money for the rebuilding of her castle and her own birthday celebration. As Sergay Wáng noted, the city was suffering from increasing unemployment. Small glimpses of her past revealed that when Mashiro was young, she was completely spoiled as a child, being given virtually anything she wanted on demand. When she overheard some of the rumors that she was not the true princess, Mashiro's behavior worsened due to her highly increased feelings of insecurity and inadequacy.

During an emergency, she formed a contract with Arika to save their lives. Unfortunately for the two, the search for ways to break the contract yielded no answers. While Mashiro and Arika were initially very opposed to their contract, its life-binding conditions actually created a break in the tension between them, and they slowly began to bond.

- Miyu

A mysterious traveler who watches over Arika. Her uniform is similar to her Searrs "Mithril Dress" from My-HiME except it has long pants instead of shorts. Overtime, she would stay with Mai Tokiha and the Crystal Princess, Mikoto, in the Black Valley.

== Related works ==
The My-Otome manga follows an alternate storyline; in it, Mashiro Blanc de Windbloom is actually a male imposter attending classes at Garderobe as a replacement for the real Mashiro after she was "killed" but later it is revealed that he is Mashiro's twin brother and the true heir. The manga was serialized in Shōnen Champion.

A spin-off manga titled My-Otome Saga: Ryū to Otome no Namida (舞-乙HiME列伝(マイオトメ・サガ) 竜と乙女の涙, Mai-Otome Retsuden: Ryū to Otome no Namida; lit. 'My-Otome Saga: The Dragon and the Maiden's Tear'), set 100 years into the past of the My-Otome anime, was serialized in MediaWorks' Dengeki G's Magazine between February 2007 and July 30, 2007, containing five chapters. The manga is accompanied by a novel based on the same premise and characters but with a different title, My-Otome Saga: Ayane Kōrin♥Hen (舞-乙HiME列伝(マイオトメ・サガ) アヤネ降臨♥篇, Mai-Otome Retsuden: Ayane Kōrin♥Hen; lit. 'My-Otome Saga: Ayane's Descent♥Chapter'), which is being published by Tokuma Shoten under their Tokuma Dual Bunko label. This novel and manga are part of the My-HiME Big Bang Project, a plan to release a large amount of products related to My-HiME and My-Otome in Japan in the year 2007. As of now, only six products within this project have been revealed so far.

There is also a spin-off manga called My-Otome Arashi (舞‐乙HiME嵐, Mai-Otome Arashi), which takes place immediately after the events of My-Otome.

In addition, there's also a PlayStation 2 Game called My-Otome: Otome Butōshi!! (舞-乙HiME 乙女舞闘史!!, Mai-Otome: Otome Butōshi; lit. "My-Otome: Otome Dance Fight Chronicles!!")), which narrates all the main story outline of My-Otome, and highlights all the Dance Fights between Otomes.

== Theme songs ==
Opening themes

- "Dream☆Wing" by Minami Kuribayashi (Ep. 1–15)
- "Crystal Energy" by Minami Kuribayashi (Ep. 16–25)
- "Fierce Sky/Raging Earth" (猛る空/揺らぐ大地, Takeru Sora/Yuragu Daichi) by Yuki Kajiura (Ep. 26)

Ending themes

- "Otome wa DO MY BEST desho?" (乙女はDO MY BESTでしょ?) by Mika Kikuchi and Ami Koshimizu (Ep. 1–26)

Insert songs

- "Kaze to Hoshi ni Dakarete..." (風と星に抱かれて...) by Minami Kuribayashi (Ep. 24)
- "Hoshi ga Kanaderu Monogatari" (星が奏でるものがたり) (4th Stanza) by Ami Koshimizu (Ep. 22)
