= My-HiME =

Japanese anime television series

- 舞-HiME
- Genre: Slice of life; Supernatural; Magical girl
- Created by: Hajime Yatate
- Developed by: Hiroyuki Yoshino
- Directed by: Masakazu Obara
- Music by: Yuki Kajiura
- No. of episodes: 26 + 26 DVD-only shorts (list of episodes)

Production
- Producers: Hisanori Kunisaki; Naotake Furusato
- Production companies: Sunrise; Bandai Visual

Original release
- Network: TXN (TV Tokyo)
- Release: September 30, 2004 – March 31, 2005

Related
- Related works
- My-HiME (manga); My-Otome; My-Otome Zwei; My-Otome 0: S.ifr
- Original video animation

My-Hime: The Black Dance/The Last Supper
- Studio: Sunrise
- Released: January 27, 2010

My-HiME (舞-HiME, Mai-Hime) is a Japanese anime produced by Sunrise. Directed by Masakazu Obara and written by Hiroyuki Yoshino, it premiered in Japan on TV Tokyo from September 2004 to March 2005. The series focuses on the lives of Himes, girls with the capacity to materialize photons, who gather at Fuka Academy for secret purposes.

The series was licensed for North American distribution by Bandai Entertainment and European distribution by Bandai's European subsidiary, Beez, with the first American DVD released in March 2006. Bandai released the Complete Collection DVD set in America on October 7, 2008. It is also shown on iaTV in the mid-2000s and on Comcast's Anime Selects on Demand for a limited time. At Otakon 2013, Funimation had announced that it acquired the series, along with a handful of other former BEI titles. They also announced at the 2017 New York Comic Con that they would release My-HiMe, My-Otome, and a My-Otome Zwei + My-Otome 0: S.ifr pack, all on Blu-Ray + DVD combo packs on January 8, 2018.

== Plot ==
The series focuses on Mai Tokiha, a somewhat ordinary high school girl who has recently transferred to the prestigious Fuuka Academy with her younger brother, Takumi. The elite Fuuka Academy harbors numerous mysteries involving both fellow students and staff. As they arrive, Mai finds herself bound to a Child, a half-spiritual, half-mechanical creature that can only be summoned and controlled by girls with the Hime mark.

Mai is told that she is one of twelve girls who have the aforementioned mark, and that they must use their powers to protect everyone from Orphans, monstrous creatures with abilities similar to the Hime's Children. She is reluctant to become involved at first, because of her protective role towards her brother, but the other Himes quickly begin to manifest around her, each with very different motivations and goals for using her powers or not. As the Orphans become more numerous and aggressive, Mai joins the other Himes fighting against them to protect those around her, including her friends, who are even drawn into the conflict as well. However, Mai and the other Himes soon find out the Orphans are not the only kind of enemy they have to fight, and as the cause of all of this is revealed, they find themselves facing the dark secret about their destiny.

== Characters ==
Creator Masakazu Obara stated that he "wanted to reverse the roles that men and women usually play", making the actresses take leading roles.

Mai Tokiha (鴇羽 舞衣, Tokiha Mai)
Voiced by: Mai Nakahara (Japanese); Carol-Anne Day (English)
Mai is portrayed as a self-reliant person, hesitant to tell others about her problems. She is a first-year high school student who is Mikoto Minagi's roommate.
Mikoto Minagi (美袋 命, Minagi Mikoto)
Voiced by: Ai Shimizu (Japanese); Caitlynne Medrek (English)
Mikoto is a third-year middle school student who behaves like a cat. She loves to be with Mai, often at her side or clinging to her. Mikoto also has a problem with spicy foods, and consuming it will often send her into rampages while looking for water.
Natsuki Kuga (玖我 なつき, Kuga Natsuki)
Voiced by: Saeko Chiba (Japanese); Cheryl McMaster (English)
Natsuki is a serious high school student. She does not work with Mikoto or Mai, but the three become friends as the series progresses.
Akira Okuzaki (尾久崎 晶, Okuzaki Akira)
Voiced by: Sanae Kobayashi (Japanese); Annika Odegard (English)
Akira is the roommate of Mai Tokiha's younger brother Takumi Tokiha and attends the Fuka Middle school with him. Akira's strong-willed and forceful personality contrasts with Takumi's kind and (relatively) feminine attitude and is extremely private, setting up a curtain and strict boundaries for the room. Akira is also a student of Ishigami, the art teacher.

Akira in My-Hime

Alyssa Searrs (アリッサ・シアーズ, Arissa Shiāzu)
Voiced by: Yuko Miyamura (Japanese); Wendy Morrison (English)
Alyssa debuts in the Fuuka Academy choir, where she is well-known around the school for her wonderful singing voice and is commonly dubbed the "Golden Angel". Mikoto Minagi and Mai Tokiha encounter her on a hillside singing with Miyu Greer during a day off, where they exchange a few words. Alyssa is frequently seen clinging to Miyu, and rarely speaks unless spoken to, coming off as very shy and timid.

== Related media ==
A manga titled My-HiME EXA (舞-HiME EXA) was developed by Sunrise. It was first serialized in Dengeki Daioh in 2010.

=== My-HiME Destiny ===
My-HiME Destiny

My-HiME Destiny (舞-HiME Destiny, Mai-HiME Destiny) is a light novel series published in Hobby Japan's monthly magazine, Novel Japan. It is the third universe established by the My-HiME Project. Like the My-Otome universe that went before it, it uses many elements from the My-HiME anime and manga series, such as the same character names and designs (My-Otome changed parts of the names to reflect a more European setting) but with different lead characters and a different premise (HiME are absent and are instead replaced by MiKO and psychic characters). Currently thirteen chapters have been released.
