= 2nd Okinawa International Movie Festival =

2010 film festival in Naha, Japan

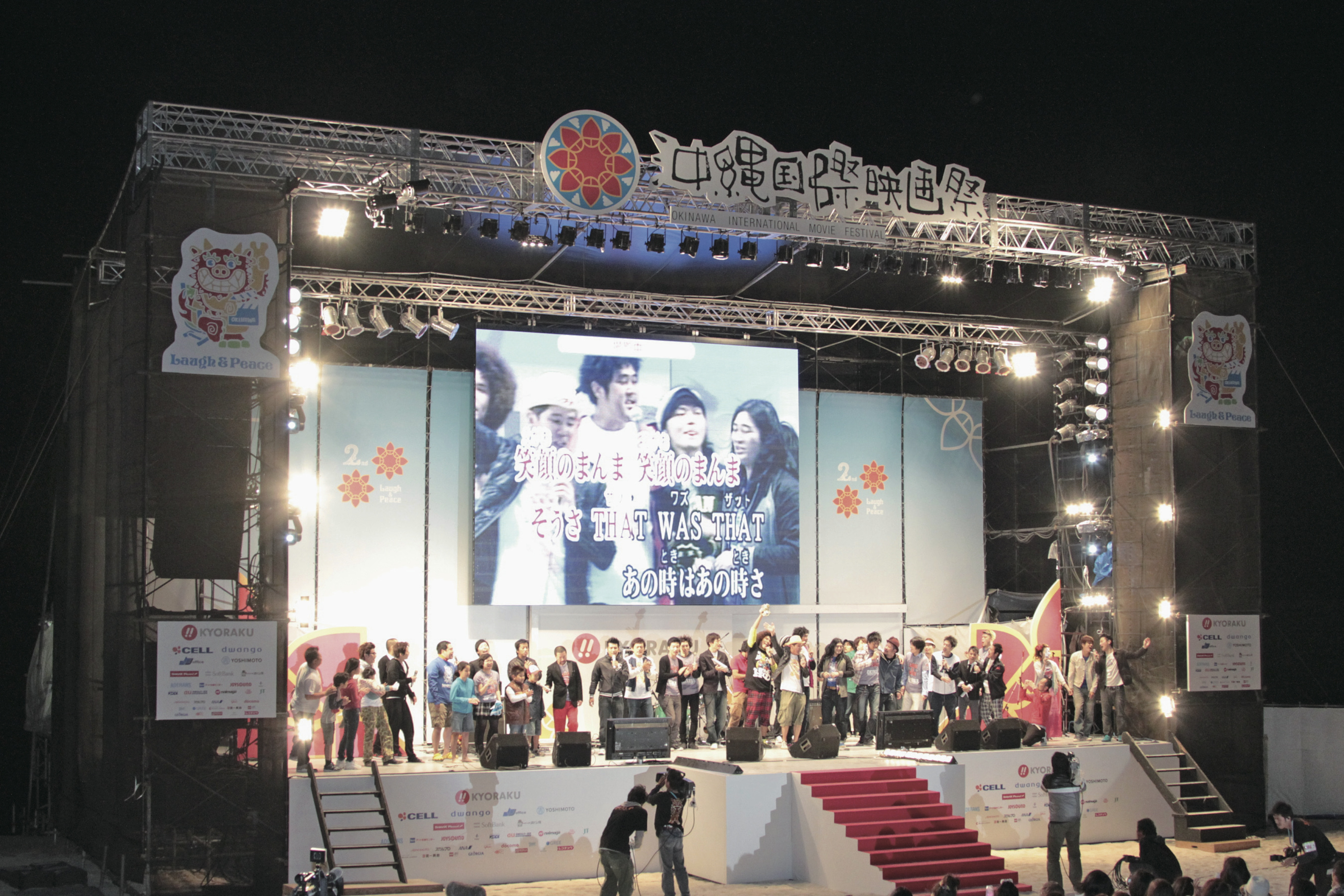
- Main stage of 2nd Okinawa International Movie Festival
- Opening film: Furimun in Okinawa
- Closing film: Saraba Itoshi no Daitouryou
- Location: Okinawa Island, Japan
- Founded: 2009
- Awards: Golden Shisa Award (Miss Kurosawa Film)
- Festival date: March 20 – 28, 2010
- Website: http://www.oimf.jp

The 2nd Okinawa International Movie Festival was held from March 20 to March 28, 2010, and took place at the Okinawa Convention Center in Ginowan City and Sakurazaka Theater in Naha, owned and run by Japanese director Yuji Nakae. Attendance was recorded as 380,000, with 194 official guests. The Golden Shisa was awarded to Taku Watanabe for his Miss Kurosawa Film.

Japanese J-Pop singer Namie Amuro was a special guest on the Okinawa International Movie Festival red carpet on March 24. Other guests included Korean actor Kang Ji-hwan, Chinese director Ing Sheng, Korean-American actor Steve Seungjun Yoo, Taiwanese Director Fu Tien-Yu and Adisorn Tresirikasern, a director from Thailand.

== Official selection ==
The official selection of films was broken into two categories, "Laugh" and "Peace". The former focuses on comedy films, while the latter includes dramas and documentaries with elements of comedy.

== Competition ==
=== Laugh Category ===
The following films were selected as In Competition for the Laugh Category:

English title	Original title	Director(s)	Production country/countries
A.D. Girl - Things She Must Do Tomorrow	明日やること ゴミ出し 愛想笑い 恋愛	Ryuta Agari	Japan
Selfish Planet!	宇宙で1番ワガママな星	Hiroaki Ito	Japan
Stay The Night at The Grave	お墓に泊まろう！	Takayuki Ito	Japan
Miss Kurosawa Film	クロサワ映画	Taku Watanabe	Japan
Saraba Itoshi no Daitoryo	さらば愛しの大統領	Daisuke Shibata & Atsumu Watanabe	Japan
Zebraman 2: Attack on Zebra City	ゼブラーマン ゼブラシティの逆襲	Takashi Miike	Japan
Close Encounters Of The Stupid ~Tales of Rossy Stardust & Junior From Mars~	無知との遭遇 CLOSE ENCOUNTERS OF THE STUPID	Takanobu Goda	Japan
Miracle Girls: Neva-da Stop Dreaming	矢島美容室 THE MOVIE ～夢をつかまネバダ～	Shinya Nakajima	Japan
Watashi no Yasashikunai Senpai	私の優しくない先輩 '	Yutaka Yamamoto	Japan
My Girlfriend is an Agent	7급 공무원 '	Shin Tae-Ra	South Korea
On His Majesty's Secret Service	大内密探灵灵狗 (Da Nei Mi Tan Ling Ling Gou) '	Wong Jing	Hong Kong
The Hangover (film)	—N/a	Todd Phillips	United States
Fanboys (film)	—N/a	Kyle Newman	United States

=== Peace Category ===
The following films were selected as In Competition for the Peace Category:

English title	Original title	Director(s)	Production country
Solanin	ソラニン	Takahiro Miki	Japan
My Darling is a Foreigner	ダーリンは外国人	Kazuaki Ue	Japan
Sunshine Ahead	てぃだかんかん ～ 海とサンゴと小さな奇跡～	Toshio Lee	Japan
A Song of Gondola	ニライの丘 ～A Song of Gondola～	Naoya Oshiro	Japan
The Hero Show	ヒーローショー	Kazuyuki Izutsu	Japan
Wararaifu!!	ワラライフ!!	Yuichi Kimura	Japan
Little Big Soldier	大兵小将 (Da bing xiao jiang)	Sheng Ding	China
Bangkok Traffic Love Story	รถไฟฟ้า..มาหานะเธอ (Rot Fai Faa..Maa Haa Na Ter)	Adisorn Trisirikasem	Thailand
Somewhere I Have Never Traveled	帶我去遠方	Tien-Yu Fu	Taiwan
A Match Made in Heaven*	Rab Ne Bana Di Jodi	Aditya Chopra	India
A Town Called Panic (film)	Panique au village	Stephane Aubier & Vincent Patar	Belgium, France, Luxembourg
The Missing Lynx	El Lince Perdido	Raul Garcia & Manuel Sicilia	Spain
Hipsters (film)	Стиляги (Stilyagi)	Valery Todorovsky	Russia

=== Out of Competition ===
The following films were screened out of competition:

"Special Screening Feature on Okinawa Movie"

English title	Original title	Director(s)	Production country
Furimun in Okinawa	南の島のフリムン	Gori (comedian)	Japan
Sachiko Nakada: The Queen of Okinawan Comedy	オバアは喜劇の女王～ 仲田幸子 沖縄芝居に生きる ～	Yasunari Izuma	Japan

== Jury ==
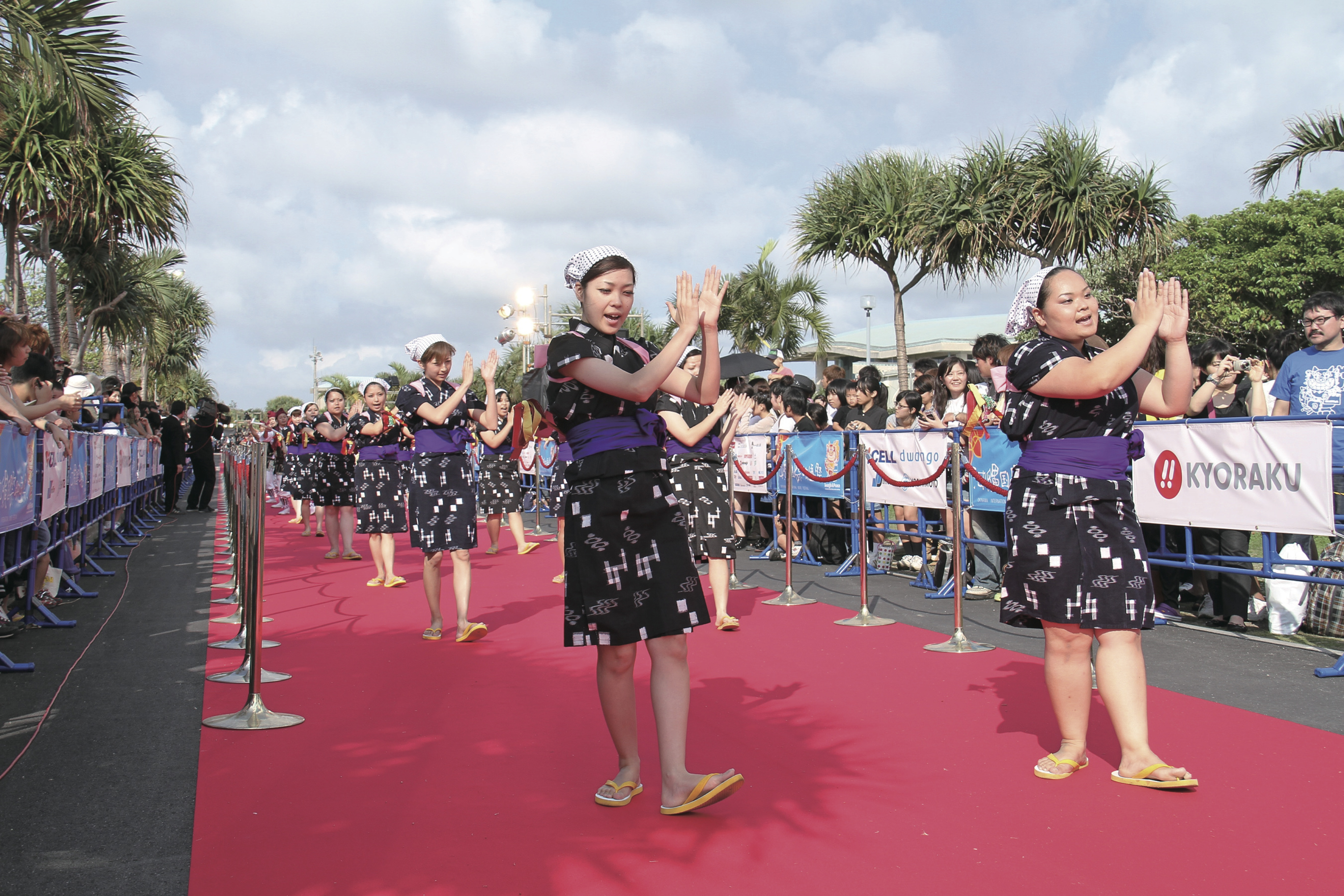
Red carpet at 2nd Okinawa International Movie Festival, 2010

Competition

- Kim Dong Ho, Executive Chairman of Pusan International Film Festival
- Lee Chi Ngai, Hong Kong director
- Lee Khan, Taiwanese filmmaker
- Christoph Terhecte, Director International Forum of New Cinema Berlin
- Eiki Matayoshi, Japanese novelist

== Awards ==
=== Official selection ===
In Competition

The Golden Shisa Award was won by the Japanese-language film Miss Kurosawa Film directed by Taku Watanabe.

The Laugh Category Uminchu Prize Grand Prix went to Miss Kurosawa Film directed by Taku Watanabe.

The Peace Category Uminchu Prize Grand Prix was won by Indian film A Match Made in Heaven by Aditya Chopra.

== See also ==
- Okinawa International Movie Festival
