= Okinawa International Movie Festival =

Annual film festival in Japan

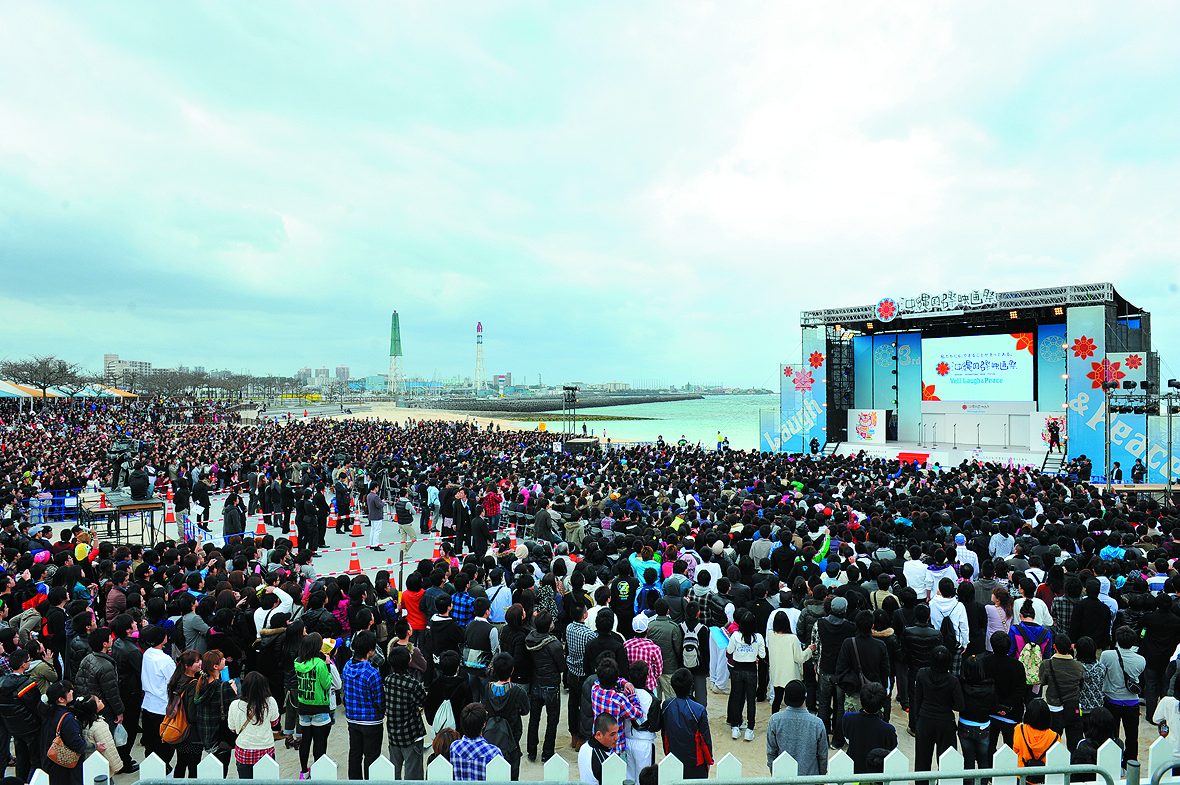
- Main stage at the 3rd Okinawa International Movie Festival, 2011
- Location: Okinawa Island, Japan
- Founded: 2009
- Language: International
- Website: http://www.oimf.jp

The Okinawa International Movie Festival is an annual film festival held in Ginowan City and Naha City on the Japanese island of Okinawa Island. The festival was founded by Japanese century-old comedy-entertainment giant Yoshimoto Kogyo in 2009 and focuses on comedy films from around the world, with the theme of "Laugh & Peace".

It is held each year at the Okinawa Convention Center and Sakurazaka Theater with indoor and outdoor screenings of film premieres and recent movies from Japan and abroad. It also hosts fashion, music and trade shows and has been likened to a Japanese matsuri in atmosphere.

The most prestigious award given out at the Okinawa International Movie Festival is the Golden Shisa Award for the best film, selected by a jury.

The 8th Okinawa International Film Festival was held from April 21, 2016 until April 24, 2016.

== History ==
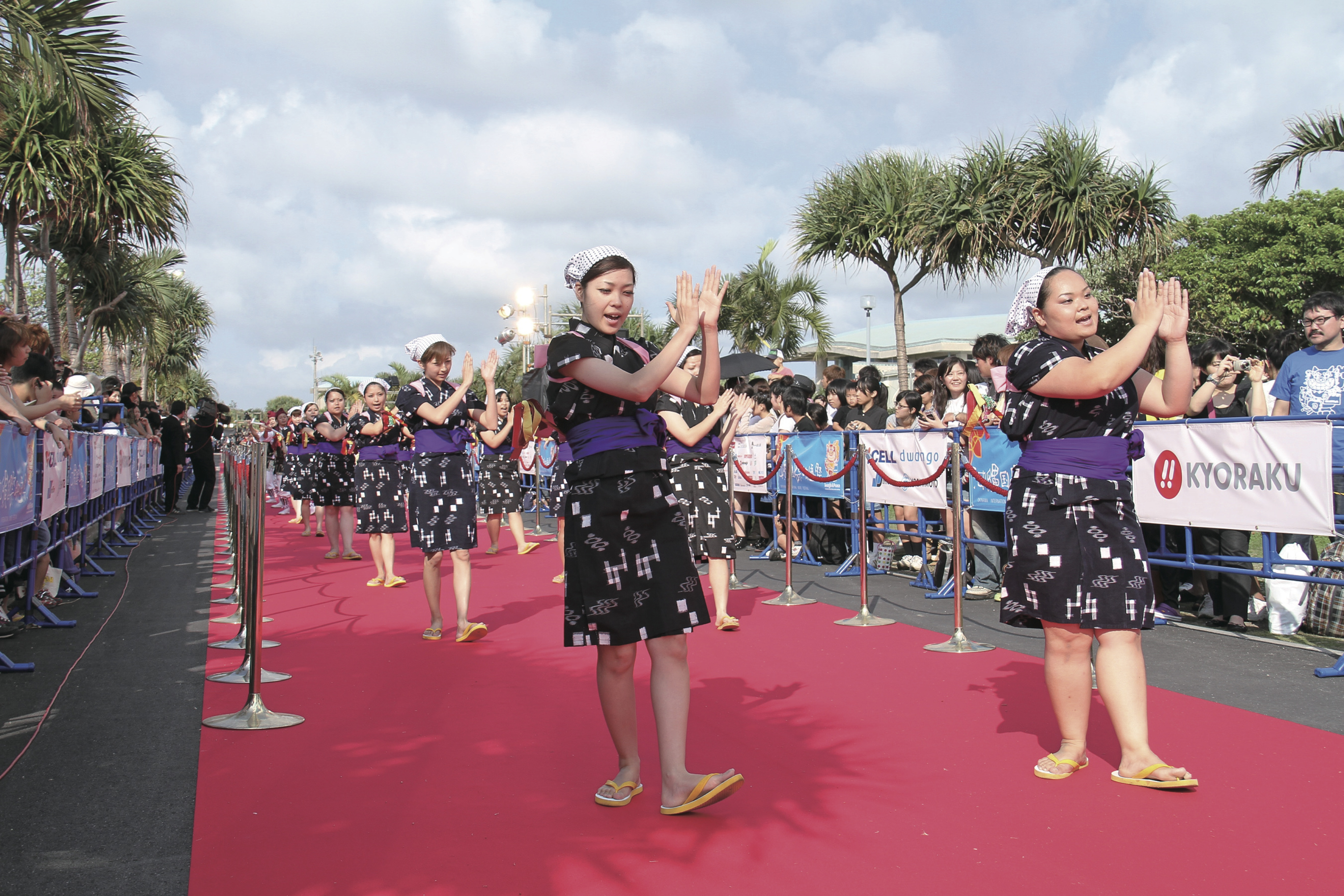
Local performers on the red carpet at the 2nd Okinawa International Movie Festival, 2010

The concept for the festival was inspired by a visit to Cannes Film Festival by Yoshimoto Kogyo CEO Hiroshi Osaki. While watching the premiere of Hitoshi Matsumoto's Dai Nipponjin he considered that the cost of making a film was higher than of putting on a festival, and so to allow people to enjoy watching films, perhaps his company could arrange their own.

Yoshimoto Kogyo, which was started by Sei and Kichibei Yoshimoto in 1912 with a rakugo theater in the grounds Tenmangu Shrine in Osaka, had been expanding throughout the 2000s with hundreds of new comedians graduating each year from New Star Creation, Yoshimoto's entertainment school. In addition it had spread out to manage athletes, producers and musicians, and two theatres in each of Tokyo and Osaka.

With Busan Film Festival director Kim Dong-ho as a patron for the Okinawa International Movie Festival, he was able to give valuable advice while other staff brought expertise from Tokyo International Film Festival. The 1st Okinawa International Movie Festival took place over four days from March 19–22, 2009 at the American Village at Mihama Chatan-cho in Okinawa City.

The location of Okinawa was selected for its natural beauty by the sea in order to replicate the atmosphere of Cannes, but with comedy at its heart.

Before each screening, every film is introduced by one of comedy agency giant and organizer Yoshimoto Kogyo's comedians.

The festival's largest screen is shipped over from Sweden and placed directly on the beach at Okinawa Convention Center. It measures just under 30m wide and 15m tall.

== Programmes ==
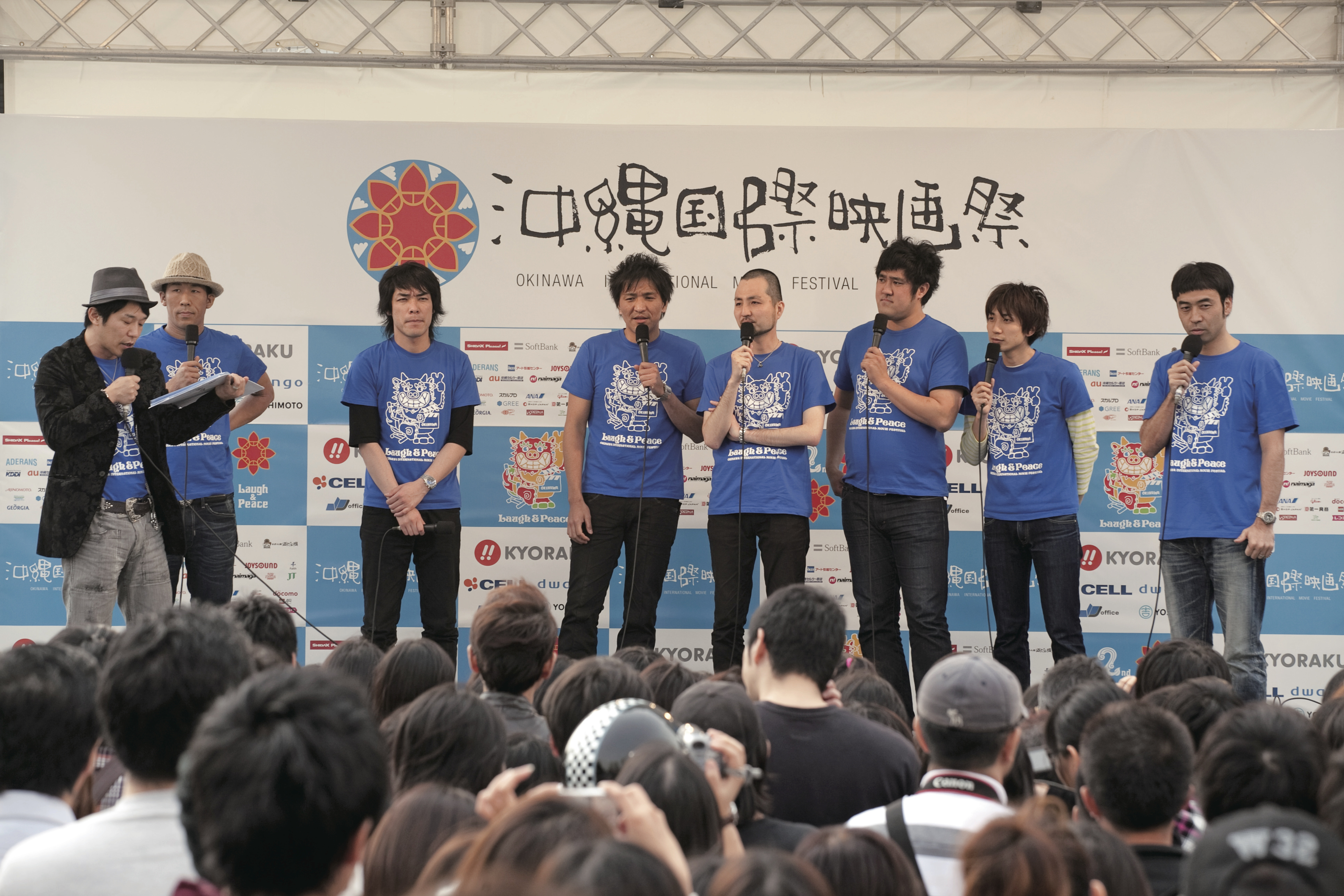
Comedians and guests on stage at the 2nd Okinawa International Movie Festival, 2010

The Okinawa International Movie Festival is organised into two main sections:

- Laugh – The first half is a selection of comedy films from around the world.
- Peace – The second half includes dramas and documentaries.

== Juries ==
Prior to the beginning of each event, the Festival's board of directors appoints the juries who hold sole responsibility for choosing which films will receive a Cannes award. Jurors are chosen from a wide range of international artists, based on their body of work and respect from their peers.

- Feature Films – An international jury composed of a President and various film or art personalities, who determine the prizes for the feature films in Competition.

== Awards ==
The most prestigious award given out at the Okinawa International Movie Festival is the Golden Shisa Award for the best film.

In addition the Uminchu Prize Grand Prix is awarded to the best film in each of the two categories.

- Competition
  - Laugh Category Uminchu Prize Grand Prix
  - Peace Category Uminchu Prize Grand Prix

== Festivals By Year ==
- 1st Okinawa International Movie Festival (2009)
- 2nd Okinawa International Movie Festival (2010)
- 3rd Okinawa International Movie Festival (2011)
- 4th Okinawa International Movie Festival (2012)
- 5th Okinawa International Movie Festival (2013)
- 6th Okinawa International Movie Festival (2014)
- 7th Okinawa International Movie Festival (2015)
- 8th Okinawa International Movie Festival (2016)

== See also ==
- Yoshimoto Kogyo
