= 4th Okinawa International Movie Festival =

2012 film festival in Japan

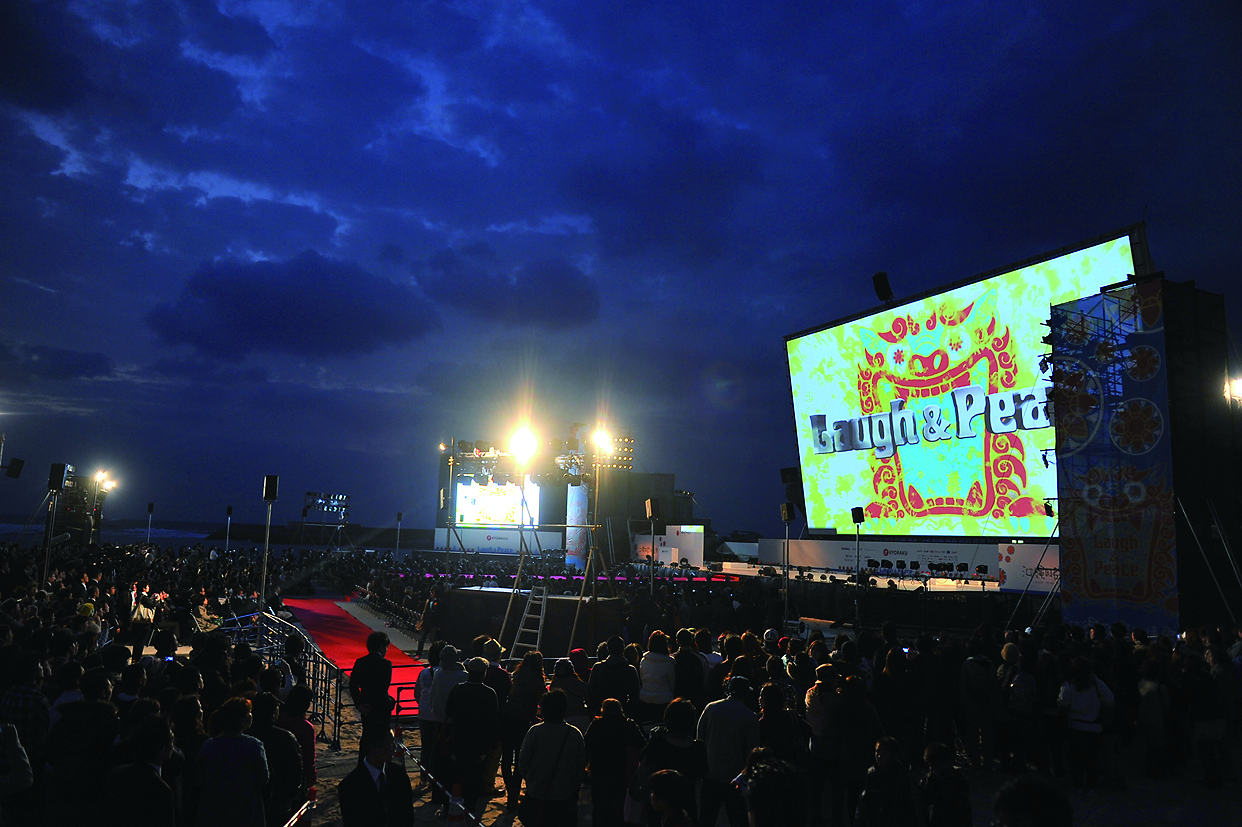
- Main stage of 4th Okinawa International Movie Festival, 2012
- Opening film: Ultraman Zoffy: Ultra Warriors vs. the Giant Monster Army
- Closing film: A Simple Life
- Location: Okinawa Island, Japan
- Founded: 2009
- Awards: Golden Shisa Award (A Simple Life)
- Festival date: March 24 – 31, 2012
- Website: http://www.oimf.jp

The 4th Okinawa International Movie Festival was held from March 24 to March 31, 2012 and took place at the Okinawa Convention Center in Ginowan City and Sakurazaka Theater in Naha, owned and run by Japanese director Yuji Nakae. Total attendance was 410,000.

The fourth Okinawa International Movie Festival also included 'Okinawa Contents Land', in which 50 companies from around Asia showcased their products and services. Other events included the Pachinko Movie Awards for gamblers, a fashion show led by model and singer Anna Tsuchiya, live music and comedy from Okinawan artists Rimi Natsukawa and Begin, and the Okinawa Elementary School Movie Festival, which nurtures filmmakers of the future.

26 films were screened in competition, The Golden Shisa Award going to A Simple Life by director Ann Hui from Hong Kong.

== Official selection ==
The official selection of films was broken into two categories, Laugh and Peace, each with 13 entrants. The former focuses on comedy films, while the latter includes dramas and documentaries with elements of comedy. Organizers focused on Asian films for this edition of the festival. Before each screening, every film was introduced by one of Yoshimoto Kogyo's comedians. 102 films in total were shown.

== Competition ==
=== Laugh Category ===
The following films were selected as In Competition for the Laugh Category:

English title	Original title	Director(s)	Production country/countries
All's Well, Ends Well 2012	八星抱喜	Hing Ka Chan & Janet Chun	Hong Kong
Ah! Minister!	あぁ...閣議	Daiya Goriki	Japan
The Bridal Night and The Lotus Root!	初夜と蓮根	Masahiro Yamaguchi	Japan
Endless Stage	営業100万回	Koichi Hamatani	Japan
Go Ahead of the Limit	ロケみつTHE MOVIE このさきのむこうに	Hiroshi Arimoto	Japan
Nasi Lemak 2.0	辣死你妈	Namewee	Malaysia
Hi-Zai	ハイザイ 神さまの言うとおり	Shuhei Fukanaga	Japan
Penny Pinchers	티끌모아 로맨스	Kim Jung-hwan	South Korea
Private Benjamin	The Unkabogable Praybeyt Benjamin '	Wenn Deramas	Philippines
SuckSeed	SuckSeed ห่วยขั้นเทพ '	Chayanop Boonprakob	Thailand
Tabakoi: The Love Story that Begins with Cigarettes	タバコイ ～タバコで始まる恋物語～ '	Michinari Nakagawa	Japan
Bridesmaids	—N/a	Paul Feig	United States
Ready	রেডি '	Anees Bazmee	India

=== Peace Category ===
The following films were selected as In Competition for the Peace Category:

English title	Original title	Director(s)	Production country
Blazing Famiglia	莫逆家族 バクギャクファミーリア	Kazuyoshi Kumakiri	Japan
Dream in the Rising Sun	ヒノマル♪ドリーム	Yuji Gobuichi	Japan
Love Is Not Blind	失恋33天	Teng Hautao	China
Joyful Reunion	饮食男女2012 (Yin Shi Nan Nv 2012)	Jui-Yuan Tsao	Taiwan, China
A Letter to Momo	ももへの手紙	Hiroyuki Okiura	Japan
Potechi	ポテチ	Yoshihiro Nakamura	Japan
Signal	シグナル 月曜日のルカ	Masaaki Taniguchi	Japan
A Simple Life	桃姐 (Tao Jie)	Ann Hui	China, Hong Kong
Working Holiday	ワーキング・ホリデー	Koichi Okamoto	Japan
The Artist*	The Artist	Michel Hazanavicius	France
Attack the Block	—N/a	Joe Cornish	United Kingdom
Café de Flore	—N/a	Jean-Marc Vallée	Canada
Hysteria	—N/a	Tanya Wexler	United States, United Kingdom

=== Out of Competition ===
The following films were screened out of competition:

Panoramic Screening

English title	Original title	Director(s)	Production country
Grap Freeter Toki	グラッフリーター刀牙	Kenichi Fujiwara	Japan
Empty	からっぽ	Shogo Kusano	Japan

== Jury ==
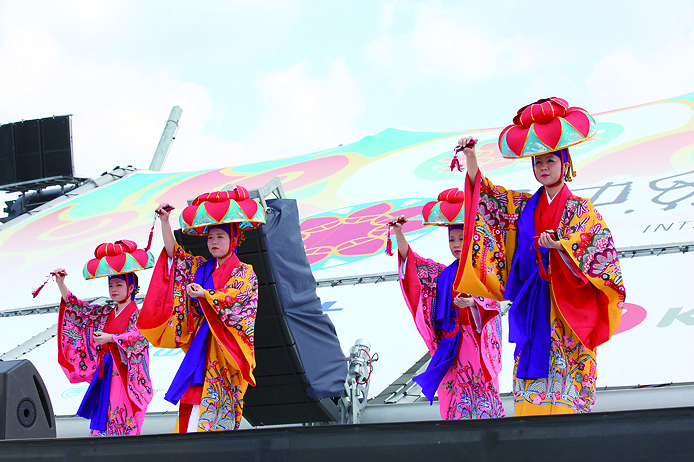
Performers at the 4th Okinawa International Movie Festival, 2012

Competition

- Qiu Fu-Sheng, Taiwanese producer
- Hu Mei, Chinese filmmaker
- Michael Hui, Hong Kong comedian and filmmaker
- Cho Young-Jeung, Busan International Film Festival programmer
- Masahide Ota, Former governor of Okinawa

== Awards ==
=== Official selection ===
In competition

The Golden Shisa Award was won by A Simple Life directed by Ann Hui.

The Laugh Category Uminchu Prize Grand Prix went to Thai musical drama SuckSeed directed by Chayanop Boonprakob.

The Peace Category Uminchu Prize Grand Prix was won by A Simple Life directed by Ann Hui.

== See also ==
- Okinawa International Movie Festival
