= 3rd Okinawa International Movie Festival =

2011 film festival in Japan

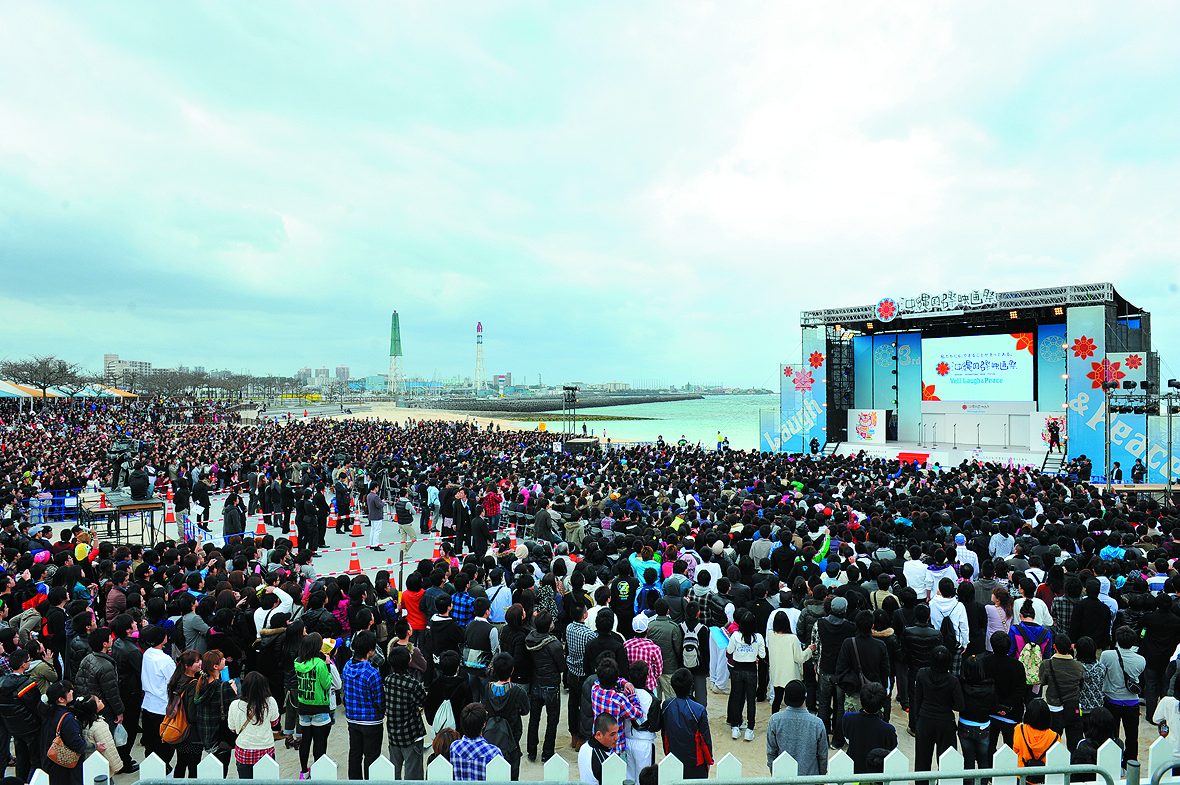
- Main stage of 3rd Okinawa International Movie Festival,
- Opening film: Manzai Gang
- Closing film: Forgotten Silver
- Location: Okinawa Island, Japan
- Founded: 2009
- Awards: Golden Shisa Award (Hankyū Densha)
- Festival date: March 18 – 27, 2011
- Website: http://www.oimf.jp

The 3rd Okinawa International Movie Festival was held from March 18 to March 27, 2011 and took place at the Okinawa Convention Center in Ginowan City and Sakurazaka Theater in Naha, owned and run by Japanese director Yuji Nakae.

This was the first Okinawa International Movie Festival to include the 'Contents Bazaar' to promote co-productions between U.S. and Japanese TV companies, though due to the Tohoku earthquake and tsunami Yoshimoto's Hollywood partners CAA did not to send representatives.

In addition, the festival also launched two new elements in 2001, The Local Origination Project for films made in locations around Japan, from Niigata to Okinawa, and the Jimot CM Competition which received ideas for TV commercials with the aim of publicizing local products and attractions from a round Japan. From 565 ideas, 10 were selected as finalists with the winner receiving a ¥470,000 prize and a terrestrial TV screening. Live music was provided by Rimi Natsukawa, Kariyushi 58 and Begin at Ginowan Seaside Park.

The Golden Shisa was awarded to Japanese director Yoshishige Miyake for his film Hankyū Densha.

== 2011 Tōhoku earthquake and tsunami ==
The festival was scaled back as a result of the March 11 Tohoku earthquake and tsunami with many guests cancelling their visits and attendance down on the previous year from 380,000 to 310,000. Only British comic writer Tony Hawks and Taiwanese director Yeh Tien-lun attended from abroad. The event was instead turned into a fundraiser raising more than US$1 million, including ¥10,949,189 (approx. US$125,000) collected by 550 staff during the event itself. Organizers Yoshimoto Kogyo had a history of assisting in the face of such disasters having set up Osaka's first FM radio network following the Great Hanshin earthquake in Kobe in 1995.

The festival started with a minute's silence held on the main stage with Yoshimoto President Hiroshi Osaki, Chairman Isao Yoshino, Okinawa Governor Hirokazu Nakaima and Ginowan City Mayor Yoichi Iha addressing the crowd.

All of the ¥6,470,000 in prize money was donated to the Japanese Red Cross Society.

== Official selection ==
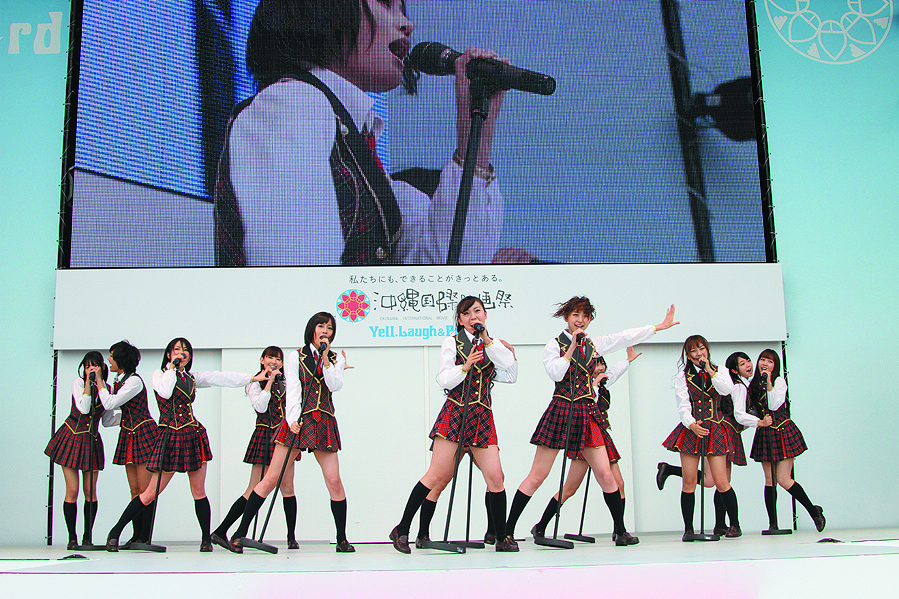
Performers included girl groups NMB48 and AKB48

The official selection was announced at a press conference on Tuesday 22 February 2011, with Hiroshi Shinagawa's "Manzai Gang" as the opening film, one of three directed by Yoshimoto Kogyo talent. A further seven were co-produced by Yoshimoto. 15 foreign titles were announced, including several premieres such as Ivan Reitman's comedy No Strings Attached (film) starring Natalie Portman and Ashton Kutcher.

== Competition ==
The official selection of films was broken into two categories, Laugh and Peace, each with 12 entrants. The former focuses on comedy films, while the latter includes dramas and documentaries with elements of comedy. The Chinese film Aftershock by Feng Xiaogang was dropped out of respect for the 2011 Tōhoku earthquake and tsunami.

=== Laugh Category ===
The following films were selected as In Competition for the Laugh Category:

| English title | Original title | Director(s) | Production country/countries |
|---|---|---|---|
| Omelette Rice | オムライス | Yuichi Kimura | Japan |
| Miss Kurosawa Film 2 | クロサワ映画2 | Taku Watanabe | Japan |
| Mask of Moonlight | 月光ノ仮面 | Itsuji Itao | Japan |
| The Pot of Good Fortune | 幸運の壺 Good Fortune | Michihito Ogawa | Japan |
| High School Debut (film) | 高校デビュー | Tsutomu Hanabasa | Japan |
| Karate-Robo Zaborgar | 電人ザボーガー | Noboru Iguchi | Japan |
| Mistaken | ミステイクン | Takayuki Ito | Japan |
| A Little Thing Called Love | สิ่งเล็กๆ ที่เรียกว่า...รัก | Puttipong Pormsaka Na-Sakonnakorn and Wasin Pokpong | Thailand |
| The Last Godfather | 라스트 갓파더 | Shim Hyung-rae | South Korea |
| Love Police | ラブポリス～ニート達の挽歌～ | Yoshihiro Sakata | Japan |
| Night Market Hero | 鸡排英雄 (Ji pai ying xiong) | Tien-Lun Yeh | Taiwan |

=== Peace Category ===
The following films were selected as In Competition for the Peace Category:

| English title | Original title | Director(s) | Production country |
|---|---|---|---|
| With the Dog Tag and the Croquette | 犬の首輪とコロッケと | Seiki Nagahara | Japan |
| Ghostwriter Hotel | ゴーストライターホテル | Hiroaki Ito | Japan |
| Tsugaru | 津軽百年食堂 | Kazuki Ōmori | Japan |
| TSY | TSY | Michinari Nakagawa | Japan |
| Hankyū Densha | 阪急電車 片道15分の奇跡 | Yoshishige Miyake | Japan |
| Fly! | FLY！～平凡なキセキ～ | Masahiro Kondo | Japan |
| Bruce Lee, My Brother | 李小龍 | Raymond Yip & Manfred Mann | Hong Kong |
| Skyline (film) | —N/a | Greg Strause & Colin Strause | United States |
| I Hate Luv Storys | आई हेट लव स्टोरी | Punit Malhotra | India |
| Round Ireland with a Fridge | —N/a | Ed Bye | United Kingdom |
| Simple Simon | I rymden finns inga känslor | Andreas Ohman | Sweden |
| Six Degrees of Celebration | Ёлки | Timur Bekmambetov | Russia |

=== Out of Competition ===
The following films were screened out of competition:

Special Screening "Okinawa Presentation"

| English title | Original title | Director(s) | Production country |
|---|---|---|---|
| A Yell from Heaven | 天国からのエール | Chikato Kumazawa | Japan |

Project of Local Areas "Films from Local Areas"

| English title | Original title | Director(s) | Production country |
|---|---|---|---|
| When You Wish Upon A Star | ほしのふるまち | Koji Kawano | Japan |

== Jury ==
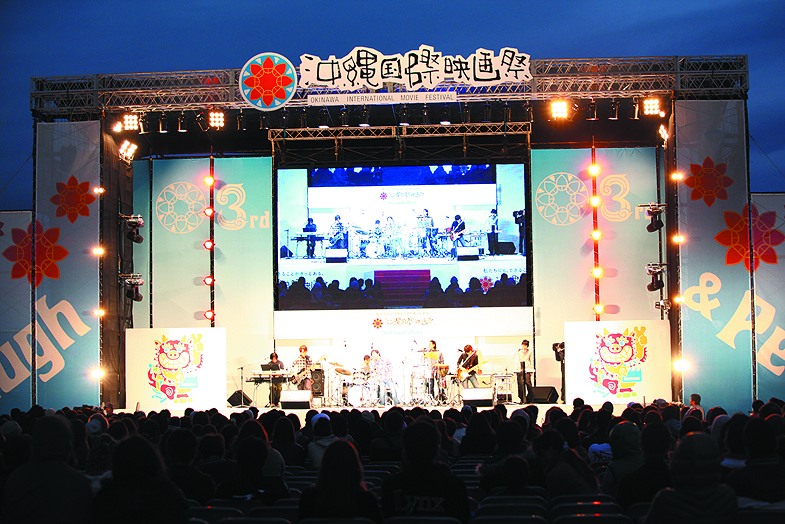
Main stage of 3rd Okinawa International Movie Festival, 2011

Competition

- Lee Yong Kwan, Chairman of Busan International Film Festival
- Wang Rugang, Chinese comedy actor
- Chu Yu-ning, Taiwanese filmmaker
- Kiyota Oshiro, Japanese Pointillist

== Awards ==
=== Official selection ===
In Competition

The Golden Shisa Award was won by the Japanese-language film Hankyū Densha directed by Yoshishige Miyake.

The Laugh Category Uminchu Prize Grand Prix went to "A Crazy Little Thing Called Love" from Thailand, directed by Puttipong Pormsaka Na-Sakonnakorn and Wasin Pokpong.

The Peace Category Uminchu Prize Grand Prix was won by Hankyū Densha by Yoshishige Miyake.

The Jimot CM competition Grand Prix Award went to Masako Suzuki. The Grand Prix Award winner in the World Wide Laugh short-film was "Balloon Man the Challenge" by TBS.

== See also ==
- Okinawa International Movie Festival
