= 1st Okinawa International Movie Festival =

2009 film festival in Japan

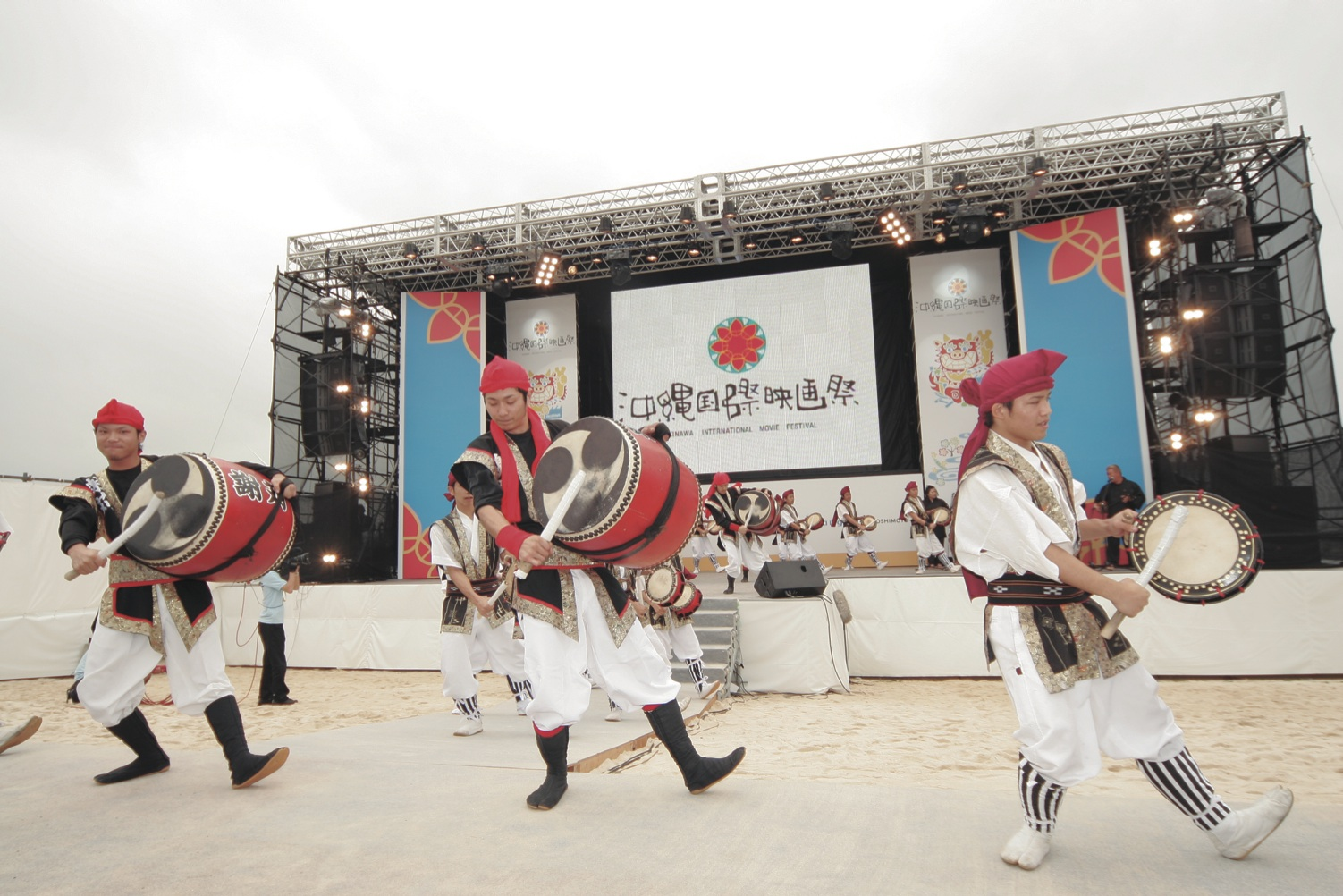
- Local performers on the main stage of the 1st Okinawa International Movie Festival
- Opening film: Goemon
- Closing film: Burn After Reading
- Location: Okinawa Island, Japan
- Founded: 2009
- Awards: Competition Grand Prix (Battle League Horumo)
- Festival date: March 19 – 22, 2009
- Website: http://www.oimf.jp

The 1st Okinawa International Movie Festival was held from March 19 to March 22, 2009, and took place at American Village in Mihama, Chatan, Okinawa. The inaugural events saw 38 films being shown and was supported by the Ministries of Economy, Trade and Industry, and Foreign Affairs, along with the Cabinet Office in Okinawa.

Most of the films for the first Okinawa International Movie Festival were shown free of charge, with a few priced at ¥800/ ¥400 for adults/ children. Sunset Beach in Chatan Town also hosted performances by Okinawan artists Rimi Natsukawa and the Rinken Band.

The Competition Grand Prix was awarded to Japanese director Katsuhide Motoki for his film Battle League Horumo.

== Official selection ==
The official selection of films shown in competition included three domestic films out of eight in competition, all of which were given their world premiers. The five competing foreign films were given their Japan premier at the festival.

=== Competition ===
The following films were selected as In Competition:

| English title | Original title | Director(s) | Production country/countries |
|---|---|---|---|
| Battle League Horumo | 鴨川ホルモー | Katsuhide Motoki | Japan |
| Guardian Angel | 守護天使 | Yuichi Sato | Japan |
| Baby, Baby, Baby! | ベイビィ ベイビィ ベイビィ！ | Kazuyuki Morosawa | Japan |
| Sunshine Cleaning | —N/a | Christine Jeffs | United States |
| A Fiancé For Yasmina | Un novio para Yasmina | Irene Cardona | Spain, Morocco |
| My Stars | Mes stars et moi | Laetitia Colombani | France |
| Simply Actors | 戲王之王 | Hing-Ka Chan & Patrick Leung | Hong Kong |
| Unstoppable Marriage | 못말리는 결혼 | Seong-wook Kim | South Korea |

=== Out of Competition ===
The following films were screened out of competition:

Special Invitation

| English title | Original title | Director(s) | Production country |
|---|---|---|---|
| Goemon (film)* | GOEMON | Kazuaki Kiriya | Japan |
| Oppai Volleyball* | おっぱいバレー | Yuichi Sato | Japan |
| Yes Man (film) | —N/a | Peyton Reed | United States |
| The Summit: A Chronicle of Stones to Serenity | 劔岳 点の記 | Daisaku Kimura | Japan |
| Burn After Reading | —N/a | Joel & Ethan Coen | United States |
| Crows Zero 2 | クローズZERO II | Takashi Miike | Japan |
| Beverly Hills Chihuahua* | —N/a | Raja Gosnell | United States |
| Gloss | Глянец | Andrei Konchalovsky | Russia |
| If You Are the One | 非诚勿扰 (Fei Cheng Wu Rao) | Xiaogang Feng | China |
| Painted Skin* | 画皮 (Hua Pi) | Gordon Chan | China |

Special Screening

| English title | Original title | Director(s) | Production country |
|---|---|---|---|
| Ah Single | あゝ独身 | Yoshiyuki Kuroda | Japan |
| Otosan wa Ohitoyoshi | お父さんはお人好し | Torajiro Saito | Japan |
| Tokyo Kid | 東京キッド | Torajiro Saito | Japan |
| No Problem | 無問題 | Alfred Cheung | Hong Kong, Japan |
| The Circus (1928 film) | —N/a | Charlie Chaplin | United States |
| The Gold Rush | —N/a | Charlie Chaplin | United States |
| Drunken Master | 醉拳 | Woo-Ping Yuen | Hong Kong |
| French Cancan | French Cancan | Jean Renoir | France, Italy |
| Feature on Osamu Tezuka | 手塚治虫特集 | Osamu Tezuka | Japan |
| Feature on Fujio Akatsuka | 赤塚不二夫特集 | Fujio Akatsuka | Japan |
| Feature on Mikio Igarashi | いがらしみきお特集 | Mikio Igarashi | Japan |
| Feature on Tatsuo Yoshida | 吉田竜夫（タツノコプロ）特集 | Tatsuo Yoshida | Japan |
| Feature on Walt Disney | ウォルト･ディズニー特集 | Walt Disney | United States |
| Airplane! | —N/a | Jim Abrahams, David Zucker, Jerry Zucker | United States |
| Tough Guys! | Tough Guys! | Shintaro Kishimoto | Japan |
| Mutenkadesuyo! The Movie | 無添加ですよ！ザ・ムービー | Jiro Nishida | Japan |

Yoshimoto Special Presentation (all world premieres)

| English title | Original title | Director(s) | Production country |
|---|---|---|---|
| King of the Escape | 板尾創路の脱獄王 | Itsuji Itao | Japan |
| Drop | ドロップ | Hiroshi Shinagawa | Japan |
| Nisesatsu | ニセ札 | Yuichi Kimura | Japan |
| Furimun in Okinawa | 南の島のフリムン | Gori (comedian) | Hong Kong, Japan |

== Jury ==
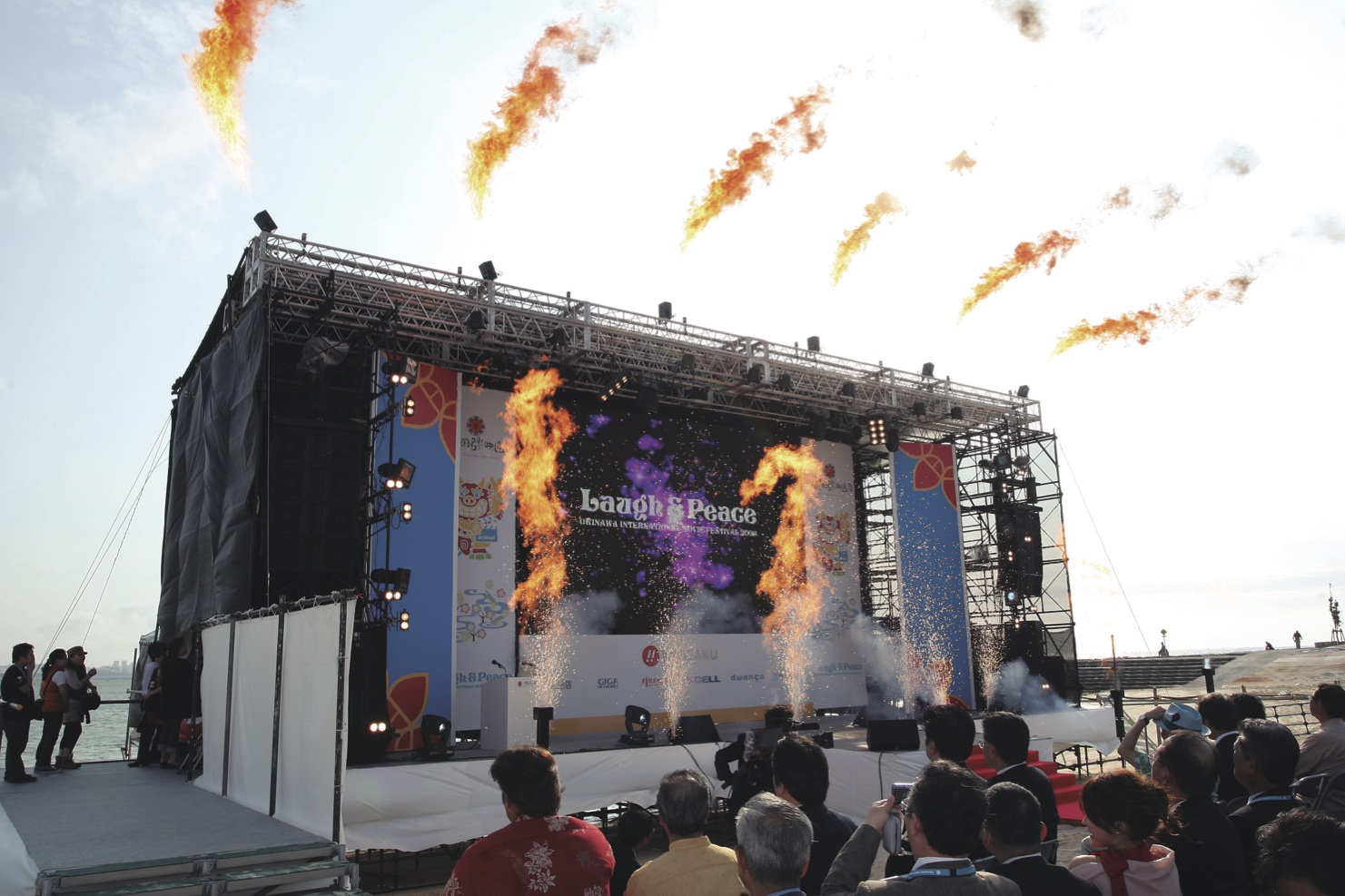
Main stage of OIMF 2009

Competition

- Kim Dong Ho, Executive Chairman of Pusan International Film Festival
- Jerry Zucker, Writer & director from the United States
- Somemaru Hayashiya, Comic storyteller
- Gordon Chan, Hong Kong filmmaker
- You (actress), Japanese actress
- Bokunen Naka, Woodblock artist

== Awards ==
=== Official selection ===
In Competition

The Okinawa International Movie Festival "Laugh & Peace" Competition Grand Prix was won by the Japanese-language film Battle League Horumo directed by Katsuhide Motoki.

== See also ==
- Okinawa International Movie Festival
