= Tengoku Kara no Yell =

- Film poster advertising Tengoku Kara no Yell in Japan
- Directed by: Makoto Kumazawa
- Written by: Masaya Ozaki, Kimiko Ueno
- Produced by: Yoshiko Makabe, Keiichi Shigematsu, Hirohisa Mukuju
- Starring: Hiroshi Abe, Nanami Sakuraba, Win Morisaki
- Cinematography: Masato Kaneko
- Music by: Nobuhiro Mitomo, Yūsuke Hayashi
- Production companies: Django Film, Asmik Ace Entertainment
- Distributed by: Asmik Ace Entertainment
- Release dates: 27 March 2011 (Okinawa International Movie Festival); 1 October 2011 (Japan)
- Running time: 114 minutes
- Country: Japan
- Language: Japanese

A Yell from Heaven (天国からのエール, Tengoku kara no ēru) is a 2011 Japanese drama film that was inspired by the true story of the late Hikaru Nakasone. Hikaru Nakasone is an Okinawan altruist who founded the "Ajisai Ongaku Mura", a music village that is open for all to use, and his story was featured in a NHK documentary broadcast in 2009. Actor Hiroshi Abe plays the role of Hikaru Oshiro, whose character is based closely on Nakasone. Actress and idol Nanami Sakuraba also stars in the film, playing the role of a student who aspires to be a singer and guitarist.

Tengoku Kara no Yell was first screened at the 3rd Okinawa International Movie Festival on 27 March 2011. It was subsequently released in Japanese cinemas on 1 October 2011.

== Plot ==
Hikaru Oshiro, noticing that there was a lack of music studios catering to high school students aspiring to become musicians, decided to build one studio under his bento shop. He allows high school students to use the studio for free, but he required them to be respectful and empathetic to others, and also do well academically in their schools.

== Cast ==
- Hiroshi Abe plays Hikaru Oshiro, a man who builds a music studio in the basement of his shop when he learned that a group of high school students had no place to properly practice as a band. He allows youth use the place for free, on condition that they are respectful, empathetic to others, and do well in school.
- Mimura as Hikaru Oshiro's wife.
- Nanami Sakuraba as Aya Higa, a student who is an aspiring singer and guitarist.
- Masato Yano as Yuuya Makishi
- Win Morisaki as Kai Inoha
- Shuhei Nomura as Kiyoshi Nakamura
- Taeko Yoshida as Chiyo Oshiro
- Reira Zyasiki
- Keita Tanabe as Seijun Akamine
- Higarino as Miki
- Ruri Yoshida
- Hitomi Kiyan as Aiko Makishi
- Tazuko Tamaki
- Ma-chan
- Eri Maehara as a reporter from the "Town" magazine
- Tamaki Mitshiru
- Masayuki Tahara

== Production ==
The main cast of the film Tengoku no Yell was announced on 20 October 2010. Tengoku Kara no Yell is based on the true story of Okinawan Hikaru Nakasone, who had founded the music village Ajisai Ongaku Mura. This music village is sited on the same street as Okinawa's popular Churaumi Aquarium, and it caters to high school students who aspire to become musicians, providing them with a practice studio for free and monetary loans to help them start up. Nakasone was diagnosed with kidney cancer in August 2005, and he died in November 2009 at 42 years old. His life story was featured in a 2009 NHK documentary, and was also compiled into a book entitled Our Song was Born in a Bento Shop: Yell (僕らの歌は弁当屋で生まれた YELL, Bokura no uta wa bentō-ya de umareta YELL).

Nakasone is depicted in this film as Hikaru Oshiro, who is played by actor Hiroshi Abe. Hiroshi Abe has previously starred in films like the 2007 film HERO and the 2011 film I Wish. Hiroshi Abe said that he thought this was a "dream story" and that he was very impressed with the passion of the high school students displayed.

In addition, actress Mimura, who previously starred in the 2011 NHK television series Gō, stars in this film as Hikaru's wife. Actress and idol Nanami Sakuraba will also be starring in this film, playing the role of Aya Higa, a high school student who aspires to become a musician.

The filming of Tengoku Kara no Yell began soon after the cast announcement on 20 October 2011. The main scenes of this film were entirely shot at the location of "Ajisai Ongaku Mura", the place where this film was based on. Before the filming, interviews with people familiar with Nakasone was conducted for the cast to better understand him and to portray him more realistically.

The film poster of Tengoku Kara no Yell was unveiled on 5 May 2011.

Tengoku Kara no Yell was then showcased at a preview announcing the completion of the filming of this film on 6 July 2011. When interviewed at the preview, lead actor Hiroshi Abe said that he was "under heavy pressure during the filming of this film, but he had received help from various people. Separately, actress Nanami Sakuraba revealed that she played a guitar for the first time in the filming of this film, described the experience as "fun, but my hands are shaking a lot".

=== Theme song ===
The film's theme song Arigato (ありがとう, Arigatō) is performed by the Okinawan rock band Stereopony. This was announced by the film's production committee on 25 March 2011. Stereopony named this song "Arigato", which means "thank you" in Japanese, in expression of their thanks to the late Hikaru Nakasone. Stereopony members were influenced by Mr Hikaru Nakasone's teachings while they were at the music village he created.

Arigato was released as the title track of a single album on 28 September 2011. It was released in a Limited Edition 'A' version and an ordinary 'B' version. The 'A' version come a DVD containing special footage of this film. Actor Hiroshi Abe appears on the front cover of the 'B' version of this single.

== Release ==
Tengoku Kara no Yell was first released at the 3rd Okinawa International Movie Festival on 27 March 2011. It was subsequently released in Japanese cinemas on 1 October 2011.
