= Chiaki Morosawa =

Japanese anime screenwriter

Chiaki Morosawa (両澤 千晶, Morosawa Chiaki; 28 March 1959 – 19 February 2016) was a Japanese anime screenwriter and the creator of the fictional universe of "Cosmic Era", the setting for the anime Mobile Suit Gundam SEED (for both of which she was the head writer) and its related series. She was born in Urawa, Saitama, in the Kantou Region of Japan. An older sister of film director Kazuyuki Morosawa, she was the wife of animation director and scriptwriter Mitsuo Fukuda, and the mother of their children.

== Family ==
She was the older sister of Kazuyuki Morosawa (両沢 和幸, Morosawa Kazuyuki; born 24 November 1960), who is the film director and a screenwriter for movies Dear Friends and Baby, Baby, Baby! He is also the screenwriter for the 2003 Atashin'chi movie.

== Life ==
She first met Mitsuo Fukuda during their school days when she was an amateur doujin artist and writer. They enrolled in different high school, but participated in the doujin fandom community, and remained friends after their graduation.

Even though she later graduated from the junior college with her child care (保育科) academic degree she would later become an office worker, while he joined Sunrise in 1979, at the age of 19.

They eventually married, and she retired from scriptwriting to become a housewife. As of April 2008, she had two children with him.

== Career ==
Although she did not write for an anime until Future GPX Cyber Formula Saga, her husband consulted with her since the beginning of the Future GPX Cyber Formula, the first anime series that he directed.

She is the creator of the fictional universe of "Cosmic Era", the setting for the anime Mobile Suit Gundam SEED, Mobile Suit Gundam SEED Destiny (in which she was the head writer) and its related series. It would later be used by other writers, like in the spin-offs Mobile Suit Gundam SEED Astray and Mobile Suit Gundam SEED Stargazer.

In 2002, after the end of Mobile Suit Gundam SEED production, her medical diagnosis revealed the presence of ovarian cyst and uterine fibroid. Although she managed to complete the outline for the plot for Gundam Seed Destiny, the requirement of continuous treatment for her illness led to her handing over the actual writing duties to other staff members at Sunrise, and resultantly the postponement of the Mobile Suit Gundam SEED movie.

In 2014, she scripted a series of drama CD's featuring Mobile Suit Gundam SEED characters for the "Mobile Suit Gundam SEED Destiny HD Remaster Blu-ray Box". They were entitled "Omake Quarters".

== Death ==
She died on 19 February 2016, at the age of 56, from aortic dissection.

== Works ==
- Future GPX Cyber Formula
  - Future GPX Cyber Formula Saga
  - Future GPX Cyber Formula Sin
- Outlaw Star, Episode 9
- Gear Fighter Dendoh
- Mobile Suit Gundam SEED
- Mobile Suit Gundam SEED Re:
- Mobile Suit Gundam SEED: Special Edition
- Mobile Suit Gundam SEED Destiny
- Mobile Suit Gundam SEED Destiny: Special Edition
- Mobile Suit Gundam SEED Freedom (posthumous credit)
- Mobile Suit Gundam SEED Freedom Zero (posthumous credit)
