= List of Outlaw Star episodes =

Box art of the first DVD compilation released by Bandai Entertainment

The Outlaw Star anime is the adaptation of the manga series of the same name by Takehiko Ito. The plot follows the protagonist Gene and his crew in their outer space adventures on board their advanced spacecraft named the Outlaw Star.

The anime, which was produced by Sunrise and directed by Mitsuru Hongo, aired on Japan's TV Tokyo from January 8, 1998, to June 25, 1998, for a total of 26 episodes. The anime was later licensed for English language distribution in North America by Bandai Entertainment. The series originally aired on Toonami from January 15, 2001, to February 16, 2001. Episode 23 was not aired during this run due to scenes of extensive female nudity and sexually suggestive humor/themes; it was finally broadcast 17 years later, on February 25, 2018, during the revived Toonami block on Adult Swim.

Bandai released the series on DVD in Japan in two halves with the first 13 episodes released on August 25, 1999, and the remaining 13 episodes released on November 25, 1999. A Japanese "remastered" DVD boxset containing the entire series was published by Bandai on September 22, 2006. Bandai also released the series in North America in three DVD collections on September 1, 2000, February 14, 2001, and March 6, 2001. The Outlaw Star Perfect Collection Box Set, a DVD compilation of the entire series, was released on September 10, 2002. The series was again re-released on March 28, 2006, as the Outlaw Star: Complete Collection. Outlaw Star additionally received a Region 4 DVD release in Australia by Madman Entertainment on June 23, 2004.

The music for Outlaw Star was composed by Kow Otani. The series has three pieces of vocal music, one opening and two endings. The opening theme is "Through the Night" performed by Masahiko Arimachi. The two endings themes are "Hiru no Tsuki", used in the first 13 episodes, and "Tsuki no Ie", used in the remaining 13 episodes. Both endings are sung by Arai Akino.

== Episodes ==
No.	Title	Directed by	Written by	Original release date	English air date
1	"Outlaw World"; Transliteration: "Muhō no Hoshi" (Japanese: 無法の星)	Takeshi Ashizawa	Katsuhiko Chiba	January 8, 1998	January 15, 2001
Gene Starwind and James "Jim" Hawking are hired by a woman named Rachel to protect and escort her as she services farm equipment. When they are attacked by Kei Pirates, they learn Rachel is really "Hot Ice" Hilda, an outlaw in search of treasure. After the pursuing pirates are defeated, Hilda shoots Gene and forces Jim to fetch a large container. The container is opened, revealing a naked girl inside.
2	"World of Desires"; Transliteration: "Yokubō no Hoshi" (Japanese: 欲望の星)	Naoyoshi Kusaka	Katsuhiko Chiba	January 15, 1998	January 16, 2001
The girl in the container is Melfina, who wakes up from suspended animation. Escaping from the Kei Pirates in a drop-ship, Gene, Jim, Hilda, and Melfina go into space. They then take Hilda's spaceship Horus to Blue Heaven, an outlaw hangout. A Corbonite named Swanzo is enlisted to repair and resupply Horus. While Jim takes Melfina shopping, Gene and Hilda go to a bar and get into an altercation with McCoy and his lackeys. As a result, they are attacked that night in their bedroom.
3	"Into Burning Space"; Transliteration: "Moeru Uchū e" (Japanese: 燃える宇宙へ)	Naoyoshi Kusaka	Katsuhiko Chiba	January 22, 1998	January 17, 2001
Gene and Hilda defeat McCoy, and the protagonists then escape into space ahead of his men. They get into a game of chicken with a Ctarl-Ctarl ship led by Aisha Clanclan, who ends up destroying their pursuers in a fit of rage after losing. Aisha is demoted after letting the Horus escape and is left behind on Blue Heaven. When the Horus reaches an agreed upon rendezvous point, Hilda finds that the Kei Pirates have killed all her friends. The crew escapes the pirates and they set a course for Farfallus.
4	"When the Hot Ice Melts"; Transliteration: "Atsuki Kōri no Tokeru Toki" (Japanese: 熱き氷の溶けるとき)	Takahiko Hoshiai	Katsuhiko Chiba	January 29, 1998	January 18, 2001
The Horus arrives at Farfallus and docks on an asteroid containing the XGP15A-II, an advanced spaceship. Hilda turns on Gilliam II, the computer of the XGP15A-II, which registers the four as its crew. Melfina displays her ability to link her mind with the ship while the Kei Pirates arrive and attempt to gain control of the XGP15A-II. Gene, Jim, and Melfina later escape the star's gravity well, by breaking out of the asteroid, while Hilda sacrifices herself to protect them from the Kei Pirates. Gene names the ship the Outlaw Star in Hilda's honor.
5	"The Beast Girl, Ready to Pounce!"; Transliteration: "Machibuseru Kemono Musume" (Japanese: 待ち伏せる獣娘)	Shinichi Shōji	Katsuhiko Chiba	February 5, 1998	January 19, 2001
The crew of the Outlaw Star travels back to Blue Heaven and Swanzo agrees to paint and outfit the ship with a registration ID in order to pay a past debt to Hilda. Aisha, now broke and homeless, shows up and demands the coordinates of the Galactic Leyline, which Gene is unable to provide. After Aisha persistently tries to fight them, the crew takes her out to dinner, seemingly out of pity, but Gene ends up shooting her and leaving her with the restaurant bill.
6	"The Beautiful Assassin"; Transliteration: "Uruwashiki Ansatsusha" (Japanese: 麗しき暗殺者)	Naoyoshi Kusaka	Katsuhiko Chiba	February 12, 1998	January 22, 2001
Gene and Jim meet up with an old friend, a wealthy businessman named Fred Luo, who has become the target of a female assassin named "Twilight" Suzuka. Gene agrees to protect Fred in exchange for munitions, and ends up beating Suzuka in a duel. Suzuka agrees to leave Fred alone as long as Gene is alive, and vows to kill him instead.
7	"Creeping Evil"; Transliteration: "Shinobiyoru Mashu" (Japanese: 忍び寄る魔手)	Takeshi Ashizawa	Katsuhiko Chiba	February 19, 1998	January 23, 2001
Gilliam II runs simulations to try to teach Gene how to take off in the Outlaw Star, but Gene repeatedly crashes. Jim gets his car out of impound and goes to work as mechanic while Melfina learns to cook and Gene works on the ship. A Kei Pirate attacks Melfina but Suzuka intervenes, killing him. Meanwhile, Gene's fight with another Kei Pirate leaves him poisoned. The crew then meets up on the Outlaw Star and Suzuka asks to help out because of her dislike towards the Kei Pirates.
8	"Forced Departure"; Transliteration: "Udezuku no Hasshin" (Japanese: 腕ずくの発進)	Mitsuru Hongō	Katsuhiko Chiba	February 26, 1998	January 24, 2001
Gene becomes unconscious due to his previous battle with the Kei Pirate, who offers an antidote in exchange for their ship. Gene wakes up and declines the offer and Melfina purges the poison by taking Gene into the navigator booth of the spaceship. The Kei Pirate and his robots then attack the Outlaw Star, and Gene and Suzuka defeat them, only to be confronted by three more Kei Pirate grappler ships.
9	"A Journey of Adventure! Huh?"; Transliteration: "Bōken no Tabi...e?" (Japanese: 冒険の旅...え?)	Naoyoshi Kusaka	Chiaki Morosawa	March 5, 1998	January 25, 2001
Gene does not take Jim seriously concerning the maintenance of the ship as well as their freelance business. Gene and Jim take on a contract to find and kill a man named Zomba in exchange for 10,000 wong, but they find a cyborg duplicate of this man instead, only being rewarded 2,000 wong as a result. They resolve to find the real Zomba and collect the full reward, but find out that the real Zomba has already been killed by Suzuka.
10	"Gathering for the Space Race"; Transliteration: "Uchū Rēsu ni Tsudou" (Japanese: 宇宙レースに集う)	Naoyoshi Kusaka	Katsuhiko Chiba	March 12, 1998	January 26, 2001
The Outlaw Star reaches Heifong and the crew enters the Thirteenth Annual Heifong Space Race, with some financial help by a sponsorship from Fred's company, in an attempt to promote Gene and Jim's business, and for Gene to gain more information about the El Dorado, the ship piloted by Ronald "Ron" MacDougall and Henry "Harry" MacDougall.
11	"Adrift in Subspace"; Transliteration: "Akūkan Hyōryū" (Japanese: 亜空間漂流)	Megumi Yamamoto	Katsuhiko Chiba	March 19, 1998	January 29, 2001
Gene makes a daring dive into the first checkpoint and avoids the space wave. Aisha abandons her ship and is brought on board, and after finally being convinced that Gene knows nothing about the Galactic Leyline, she decides to stay on the Outlaw Star. The crew finishes the race in fourth place, but first place in the privateer class, and they break even in their deal with Fred.
12	"Mortal Combat with the El Dorado"; Transliteration: "Eru Dorado-gō to no Shitō" (Japanese: エルドラド号との死闘)	Hiroshi Nishikiori	Katsuhiko Chiba	March 26, 1998	January 30, 2001
After the race is over, Gene contacts Harry, who challenges him to a duel between the Outlaw Star and the El Dorado in an asteroid field. The El Dorado later infiltrates the Outlaw Star, and Harry tries to hack into Gilliam II and has interest in Melfina. But it is later found out that Ron is piloting another ship, bringing Harry back with him.
13	"Advance Guard from Another World"; Transliteration: "Isei Yori no Senpei" (Japanese: 異星よりの尖兵)	Naoyoshi Kusaka	Katsuhiko Chiba	April 2, 1998	January 31, 2001
Gene and Jim set up a business on Heifong, and the crew members take on various jobs around the city, which all come together in a confrontation with a mind-controlling cactus and its giant insect servant.
14	"Final Countdown"; Transliteration: "Fainaru Kauntodaun" (Japanese: ファイナルカウントダウン)	Akihiko Nishiyama	Mitsuyasu Sakai	April 9, 1998	February 1, 2001
The Outlaw Star is performing a transport job, when the advertising ship they are pushing latches onto them and takes control of their computer. The culprit turns out to be a terrorist named Crackerjack, who threatens to blow up a bomb he has placed on the ship unless Heifong is given independence. While Gene looks for a way to disarm the bomb on the ship, Aisha and Suzuka work on tracking down Crackerjack to save the others on Heifong. (Coincidentally, the typeface for the English version of this episode's title card [and the other episodes' as well], Xoireqe, was used as the font for the lettering on The Final Countdown album, released by Swedish hard rock band Europe in 1986)
15	"The Seven Emerge"; Transliteration: "Shichininshū Arawaru" (Japanese: 七人衆現わる)	Yūji Yamaguchi	Mitsuru Hongō	April 16, 1998	February 2, 2001
Lord Hazanko gathers six of the Anten Seven together and explains that they will have to kill Gene Starwind. The seventh member, Shimi, later arrives at Starwind and Hawking enterprises and challenges Gene to a duel. Gene meets Leilong at a bar, having a friendly drink together. The following day, Gene realizes that Leilong is actually Shimi, after killing one of his lackeys. The other crew members try to interfere, but to no avail. After a one-shot duel, Gene unexpectedly wins and Shimi seemingly dies.
16	"Demon of the Water Planet"; Transliteration: "Umi no Hoshi no Akuma" (Japanese: 海の星の悪魔)	Akihiko Nishiyama	Takeshi Ashizawa	Not aired	February 5, 2001
Gene, Jim, and Melfina are contracted by an old man to recover a shipment of dragonite ore from a ship that crashed on the water planet Heifong VII, which together with Aisha leads to a battle with the creature guarding the ship and its ore. Once the dragonite ore had been loaded onto the ship, the old man sacrifices himself to the creature in order for the crew to safely escape from the planet.
17	"Between Life and Machine"; Transliteration: "Seimei to Kikai no Hazamade" (Japanese: 生命と機械の間で)	Akihiko Nishiyama	Katsuhiko Chiba	April 23, 1998	February 6, 2001
An unknown client, later found out as Ron MacDougall, contacts the crew of the Outlaw Star and asks Gene to meet him at a restaurant to discuss about the Galactic Leyline with its ties to the Outlaw Star and Melfina. Outside the restaurant, Gene, along with Jim, Aisha, and Suzuka are faced against Ron and his dog-like weapons. Meanwhile, Harry attempts to seduce Melfina and steal the Outlaw Star, but to no success.
18	"The Strongest Woman in the Universe"; Transliteration: "Uchū Saikyō no Onna" (Japanese: 宇宙最強の女)	Kazu Yokota	Takeshi Ashizawa	April 30, 1998	February 7, 2001
In exchange for a substantial loan of money from Fred, the Outlaw Star crew enters the Universal Strongman Tournament to stop Fred's fiancee, Reiko Ando, from winning as the strongest woman in the universe, and thus prevent a marriage between the two. Gene, forced to dress up as a woman, enters in the tournament under the name "Jenny", but is quickly knocked out by Reiko. Aisha, forbidden from competing on the basis of her being a Ctarl-Ctarl, also enters the tournament under the guise of a masked wrestler named "Firecat". She later fights against and triumphs over a Kei Pirate named Lady Iraga, revealed to be from the same tribe as her. Afterwards once Fred agrees to pay the money for accepting the job, the crew leaves Heifong to search for the Galactic Layline.
19	"Law and Lawlessness"; Transliteration: "Hō to Muhō" (Japanese: 法と無法)	Akihiko Nishiyama	Takehiko Itō	May 7, 1998	February 8, 2001
The Outlaw Star and its crew is captured by private security forces and Gene confronts their leader, a Saurian named Duuz, accompanied by his colleague, Valeria. The security forces attempt to help an injured civilian ship, but it turns out to be a Trojan horse. The Outlaw Star and its crew save the security forces and are rewarded with dragonite.
20	"Cats and Girls and Spaceships"; Transliteration: "Neko to Shōjo to Uchūsen" (Japanese: 猫と少女と宇宙船)	Mitsuru Hongō	Mitsuru Hongō	May 14, 1998	February 9, 2001
The Outlaw Star battles a mysterious ship and retreats, docking at a nearby outpost for repairs. Jim encounters a pair of cats in a park and follows them to their owner, a girl named Hanmyo, and he goes on a date with her. What Jim does not realize is that the girl is the pilot of the ship that attacked them, and the cats are her co-pilots.
21	"Grave of the Dragon"; Transliteration: "Ryū no Bohyō" (Japanese: 龍の墓標)	Akihiko Nishiyama	Katsuhiko Chiba	May 21, 1998	February 12, 2001
The crew searches for information about the Galactic Leyline in some ruins on a deserted planet. Harry tries to seduce and kidnap Melfina again, but he is rebuffed by Gene. Meanwhile, Ron attacks the others, only to be interrupted by an earthquake. Later at an outpost, Professor Nguyen Khan puts Melfina to sleep with code words and tells Gene to go to a prison for information on the Galactic Leyline.
22	"Gravity Jailbreak"; Transliteration: "Jūryoku Datsugoku" (Japanese: 重力脱獄)	Naoyoshi Kusaka	Mitsuyasu Sakai	May 28, 1998	February 13, 2001
Gene, taking his position as a prisoner, meets Saiyo Wong, who has the coordinates for the Galactic Leyline. They escape and the man gives Gene a device which he says contains the coordinates. Professor Khan wakes Melfina up, and Gene then kicks Khan off the ship.
23	"Hot Springs Planet Tenrei"; Transliteration: "Onsen Wakusei Tenrei" (Japanese: 温泉惑星天鈴)	Yūji Yamaguchi	Katsuhiko Chiba	June 4, 1998	February 25, 2018
The group goes to the vacation world Tenrei so Gene can look for caster shells to prepare for their trip to the Galactic Leyline. The crew relaxes in the hot springs and Gene meets with two priests, Ark and Hadul. They give him the caster shells in exchange for lewd footage of a third female priest named Urt. A side story includes a Kei Pirate named Tobigera, who repeatedly fails to assassinate Gene. NOTE: This episode was pulled from Cartoon Network's daytime Toonami and Adult Swim line-ups back in the early 2000s due to the extensive amount of female nudity and sexually suggestive content. Nearly seventeen years later, the episode has aired on February 25, 2018 as part of Adult Swim's revived Toonami line-up, albeit with a TV-MA rating and a minor edit to remove Aisha's nipples during the scene of Aisha ranting about the hot spring not being hot enough for her.
24	"Cutting the Galactic Leyline"; Transliteration: "Ryūmyaku Totsunyū" (Japanese: 龍脈突入)	Kazu Yokota	Katsuhiko Chiba	June 11, 1998	February 14, 2001
The Outlaw Star, the MacDougall brothers with Khan, and Hazanko and his crew all struggle to make their way into the Galactic Leyline, where they see a cylindrical figure covered in black and gold. Melfina is transported away as a disembodied voice asks them the reason for their return as well as for the thing they most desire.
25	"Maze of Despair"; Transliteration: "Zetsubō e no Meikyū" (Japanese: 絶望への迷宮)	Akihiko Nishiyama	Katsuhiko Chiba	June 18, 1998	February 15, 2001
Suzuka, Gene, and Aisha confront and defeat Hitoriga, Hamushi, and Jukai, respectively. Harry finds Melfina at the gate, but is severely wounded by Hazanko, who commands Melfina to open the gate. When Khan also enters the gate, Gene confronts and overpowers Ron near there, which triggers his memory of his childhood when his parents were alive. Gene later tells Jim to gather Aisha and Suzuka back onto the ship. Harry helps Gene and Khan by opening the portal before passing away.
26	"Return to Space ( Series Finale )"; Transliteration: "Sora e Kaeru" (Japanese: 空へ還る)	Mitsuru Hongō	Katsuhiko Chiba	June 25, 1998	February 16, 2001
Gene's caster shell and Hazanko's Tao magic cancel each other out, killing both of them. They are transported into the heart of the Leyline with Melfina and Khan where they are revived and have their wishes granted. Khan acquires all the knowledge in the universe and merges with the Leyline, while Hazanko receives ultimate power. Gene and Melfina wish to simply be together, whereupon Melfina's body is freed from the Leyline. Gene and Melfina combine their strength with Aisha, Jim, Suzuka and the Outlaw Star, itself, and defeat Hazanko inside the spiral of the Galactic Leyline and the Galactic Leyline moves to a new location afterwards. In the aftermath, Aisha and Suzuka have departed, but reunite with the crew of the Outlaw Star when the ship breaks down in deep space. The group heads out to another region of the galaxy, to find new adventures.
