= Hankyū Densha =

Hankyu Densha
- Film poster
- Directed by: Yoshishige Miyake
- Written by: Yoshikazu Okada
- Based on: Hankyu Densha by Hiro Arikawa
- Produced by: Takako Oki
- Starring: Miki Nakatani; Erika Toda; Kaho Minami; Tetsuji Tamayama; Nobuko Miyamoto
- Cinematography: Hidetaka Ikeda
- Edited by: Shinichi Fushima
- Music by: Ryo Yoshimata
- Production companies: Cocoon Co., Ltd.
- Distributed by: Toho
- Release dates: 23 April 2011 (Kansai, Japan); 29 April 2011 (Other regions of Japan)
- Running time: 119 minutes
- Country: Japan
- Language: Japanese

Hankyū Densha (Japanese: 阪急電車 片道15分の奇跡, Hepburn: Hankyū densha katamichi 15-fun-no kiseki; lit. Hankyu Railways - A 15-Minute Miracle) is a 2011 Japanese film. It is based on the novel Hankyū Densha by Hiro Arikawa and directed by Yoshishige Miyake. It was released in cinemas in the Kansai region of Japan on April 23, 2011, and then in other regions of the country from April 29.

The stage for the story is the commuter railway Hankyū Imazu Line in Hyōgo Prefecture, Japan.

== Cast ==
- Miki Nakatani as Shoko Takase, an office lady in her 30s. She was engaged to her boyfriend when she entered the company, but he was stolen away by a younger co-worker.
- Erika Toda as Misa Morioka, a college student with a good-for-nothing boyfriend.
- Kaho Minami as Yasue Ito
- Tetsuji Tamayama as Ryuta Toyama
- Nobuko Miyamoto as Tokie Hagiwara, a traditional old woman and the grandmother of Ami. The young Tokie was played by Mei Kurokawa.
- Kasumi Arimura as Etsuko Kadota
- Mana Ashida as Ami Hagiwara, Tokie's suffering granddaughter. Ashida was selected for this role because she is from Nishinomiya, Hyogo, and is able to speak naturally in the Kansai dialect.
- Mikahoa Mina as a housewife who is part of a circle of women who have a rich husband.
- Ryo Katsuji as Keiichi Kosaka
- Yū Koyanagi as Katsuya
- Suzuka Morita as Etsuko's friend
- Mitsuki Tanimura as Miho Gondawara
- Saki Aibu as Mayumi
- Tsutomu Takahashi as Kengo

== Film festival ==
This film was featured in the 3rd Okinawa International Movie Festival in the "Peace" category.
