= Hoshi no Furumachi (film) =

- Poster advertising this movie in Japan
- Directed by: Koji Kawano
- Written by: Hiroko Kanasugi, Koji Kawano
- Story by: Hidenori Hara
- Produced by: Chikako Nakabayashi
- Starring: Aoi Nakamura, Rio Yamashita
- Cinematography: Jun Fukumoto
- Distributed by: Toho
- Release date: 2 April 2011 (Japan)
- Running time: 120 minutes
- Country: Japan
- Language: Japanese

When You Wish Upon A Star (ほしのふるまち, Hoshi no Furumachi) is a 2011 Japanese film directed by Koji Kawano and based on the manga of the same name. It was debuted at the 3rd Okinawa International Movie Festival and was released in Japanese cinemas on 2 April 2011.

== Cast ==
- Aoi Nakamura as Kotaro Tsutsumi
- Rio Yamashita as Nagisa Ichinose
- Satomi Tezuka as Kotaro's mom
- Rie Shibata as Nagisa's mom
- Michiko Hada
- Manami Azechi
- Matsunosuke Shofukutei
- K.G. as Masaki
- Kinuyo Kodama as Minako Kurita

== Production ==
Over 800 people auditioned for a role in the film Hoshi no Furumachi, of which 46 made it to the final stage. The final audition was held at the Toyama Prefecture city hall on 31 January 2010. The list was narrowed down to 14 people, and the successful people were revealed on 2 February 2010.

Previously, on 30 January 2010, the governor of Toyama Prefecture declared his full support for the film Hoshi no Furumachi. In addition, he also announced the creation of a support committee for this film.

On 1 April 2010, it was announced that actress Rio Yamashita will be playing the role of Ichinose Nagisa, the main heroine in the manga. It was also announced that actor Aoi Nakamura will play the hero of the film. Other cast members announced that day includes Satomi Tezuka, Rie Shibata, K.G. and Kinuyo Kodama.
