= Somewhere I Have Never Traveled =

- Poster f
- Directed by: Fu Tian-yu
- Screenplay by: Fu Tian-yu
- Produced by: Wu Nien-jen
- Starring: Austin Lin; Yu Shin; Li Yun-yun; Mei Fang i Yung-feng; Lin Mei-hsiu; Wasir Chou
- Cinematography: Chou Yi-wen
- Edited by: Liu Yue-xing
- Music by: Chen Chien-chi
- Distributed by: Good Film Co.
- Release date: 11 September 2009
- Running time: 96 minutes
- Country: Taiwan
- Languages: Taiwanese; Mandarin; English

Somewhere I Have Never Traveled (帶我去遠方) is a 2009 Taiwanese film about the lives of and relationship between two teens, a high school-aged boy and his younger niece. The movie begins by showing the nature of their relationship to each other, their family, and what makes them kindred spirits. It then jumps ahead about five years, when the boy discovers there is more to life than basketball and working in the family's candy store, but his niece is not so sure she likes the new complication.

The film stars Austin Lin as Ah-hsian, Yu Shin as high school Ah-gui, and Li Yun-yun as child Ah-gui, Mei Fang as the Grandmother, Li Yung-feng as Ah-guì's Father, and Lin Mei-hsiu as the travel agent. (Ah- in Chinese is similar to the diminutive in English of John to Jonnie, Don to Donnie, Joan to Joanie, etc.)

Somewhere I Have Never Traveled received nominations in the Asian Film Festival circuit, and was recognised by the San Francisco Film Society. The movie was featured at the Karlovy Vary International Film Festival.

== Plot ==
In a small lazy southern Taiwan port town, two lonely youths are desperate to escape their drab existence. The first half of the movie is humorous at times, with the child Ah-gui seemingly intent on being killed or maimed. Her father brings home naked mannequins in his drunken stupor, to replace the wife who left him. Ah-gui's world has always been different, and the adults around her don't know why. Her grandmother takes her to see a local shaman to find out why. The shaman says her spirit has gone, but it will return when she grows up. To Ah-gui the world is black, gray, and white and full of constant frustration. Testing at her school finally determines that she is completely color blind.

The person she looks up to is her cousin Ah-hsian. In his mind Ah-hsian travels the world with the help of his bookshelf full of travel guides. A great story teller, Ah-hsian takes Ah-gui on imaginary journeys. The journeys take her away from their drab little town into a world full of odd people, strange customs, and unbelievable wonders. When asked why she has to be so different, Ah-hsian replies that wouldn't the world be boring if everyone was the same? Ah-hsian finds his feelings of being different make sense after a meeting a Japanese tourist who is traveling alone. Ah-hsian brings Ah-gui along when he takes some mosquito repellant to the visitor who is staying overnight in an extra room at the local school. When she goes to find her cousin who is taking a long time, she witnesses part of the intimate encounter between the two. The next day when the tourist departs, we seem to see a new Ah-hsian. So does Ah-gui.

Some years later, Ah-gui is still having a difficult time dealing with her life. She is now going to cosmetology school, a frustrating effort considering her disability. Instructors berate her and even Ah-hsian teases her. Ah-gui and Ah-hsian still dream and plan that one day they will go away to a place where they will not be different. Ah-hsian it turns out, is not only a dreamer, but also a hopeless romantic: the most important goal in his life is 'True Love'. Ah-hsian invites Ah-gui along on an all-night date in the harbor with his new boyfriend. Ah-gui reluctantly goes along and pretends to be asleep as she listens to the discussion. The next day she shows her anger by hacking the hair from her practice head. She attempts to borrow a thousand dollars from Ah-hsian to replace the mannequin. However, when he demands that she pay him back because apartments in New York are expensive, she tells him to keep his money. While delivering dinner to her uncle, she finds her money in one of her uncle's hiding places. Soon after, Ah-gui consults a travel agent for help in planning a trip. A pilgrimage to a certain small island in the Pacific where, according to her cousin, she will fit right in because almost everyone there is born color-blind.

Both Ah-hsian and Ah-gui soon discover that no matter how carefully you plan and dream, if you are careless with your feelings, life can be unbearably painful. Ah-gui witnesses Ah-hsian's boyfriend with another, the fight that follows, and Ah-hsian apparently crying for hours in the church confessional. In almost perfect English, a soliloquy by Ah-hsian of the passionate love sonnet Somewhere I have Never Traveled by E. E. Cummings portends a sad ending. Ah-qui wakes one night to someone banging on the door, yelling "Come quick, Ah-hsian has killed himself." After racing to the hospital on her bike Ah-gui tells her comatose cousin how disappointed she is; how chicken his is; and asks who is he going to take her away now? The movie ends with Ah-gui visiting Ah-hsian who is still in a coma. She tries to get him to play some games they used to play as children and continues asking him to wake up. Later at home with her grandmother who makes umbrellas, grandmother ask her to give her a yellow umbrella, she gives her a blue one and takes the yellow for herself to twirl. Looking off into the distance she tells her grandmother, "Look a rainbow."

== Cast ==
Somewhere I Have Never Traveled was director Fu Tien-yu's first film. She also wrote the screenplay. She is a prolific TV writer; she has received several awards for writing, including a Golden Bell Award for best screenplay. This was the first film appearance for three of the young people who play lead roles: Lín Bo-hong, Yu Shin, and Li Yun-yun. At the time the director began casting, Lin Bo-hong was competing as a singer in a Taipei TV show similar to American Idol. This was one factor in the movie's being delayed; the choice of shooting locations was another. A year later Fu still had not found an actor to play the role, but now Lin Bo-hong was available and ready to try movies.

One of the few professional actors in the movie, Wasir Chou plays two characters: the Japanese tourist and Ah-hsian's boyfriend, whom the script refers to as the "Coast Guard Boy". He is hard to notice because as the Japanese tourist he wore long hair and had a beard; as the "Coast Guard Boy" he had short hair and was clean shaven.

- Austin Lin as Ah-hsian
- Yu Shin as high school Ah-gui
- Li Yung-Feng as Ah-Gui's father
- Hsin Li as Ah-gui (youth)
- Li Yun-yun as Ah-gui (child)
- Lin Mei-hsiu as Travel agent
- Lín Bo-hong as Ah-Hsien (youth)
- Mei Fang as Grandma
- Wasir Chou as Japanese tourist also as Ah-hsian's boyfriend (2 roles)

== Production ==
The film spent over two years in production due to the problems in casting and in finding locations, which were spread all across Taiwan. The ornate Catholic church with the Chinese style murals was in Tainan County in the southwest of Taiwan. The house where the family life was shot belonged to a former Taiwanese actress. The sea front house is located near Gongliao. Gongliao is located in a small cove on the northeast Taiwan coast. The view of the lonely horizon was exactly what the director wanted. Most of the remaining scenes seem to have been shot in or near the south coast seaport of Kaohsiung.

== Soundtrack ==
Somewhere I Have Never Traveled

Film score by Chen Chien-chi
- Released: September 11, 2009
- Genre: Piano background
- Length: 38:00
- Label: Mr. Wing Productions
- Producer: Wu Nien-jen

So much mention was made of the music that the director and producer decided to release a soundtrack album. Chen Chien-chi composed the entire score for Somewhere I Have Never Traveled. Unfortunately not included in the sound track album is the closing credit song Start originally written and recorded solo by Kay Huang. It was rerecorded as a duet by Lin Bo-hong and Yu Shin. Lin Bo-hong was no stranger to singing, the singing competition he had entered was one of the reasons the movie was delayed. But for Yu Shin it was her first time to sing professionally and in a recording studio. Fortunately, Kay Huang and the producer were acquainted and Wu Nien-jen managed to procure the rights to record the song.

Somewhere I Have Never Traveled (OST) track list

Track	Title	Time
1	Crystal Babies	1:57
2	Rainbow Market	1:26
3	Hello	1:12
4	Ocean 1	0:36
5	Bubble Sea	1:18
6	If Everyone Were the Same	0:56
7	Stone Eater	1:45
8	Colorful Glasses	1:42
9	Can Anyone Speak English?	1:00
10	Encounter	3:13

Track	Title	Time
11	Depart	2:59
12	Color Blind Island	0:57
13	Staring	2:52
14	Determination	1:30
15	Somewhere I Have Never Traveled	5:22
16	Willing	1:48
17	Ocean 2	2:23
18	Spitting	1:22
19	Remotion	3:42

== Release ==
The film premiered in Taipei September 11, 2009, hosted by Executive Producer Wu Nien-jen. Also attending were friends and families of the actors, and former Premier Su Jeng-tsang and his wife.

== Home media ==
A Taiwan version of the home DVD is available. The Taiwan version has the following specifications:

Release Date:	9 February 2010
Subtitles:	English, Traditional, and Simplified Chinese
Copy protection:	Regions 3– South East Asia (including Hong Kong, S. Korea and Taiwan)
Format:	NTSC
Sound:	Dolby Digital 2.0
Publisher:	SKY Digi Entertainment Co.

== Award and nominations ==
- 2009 Taipei Film Festival, Lin Bo-hong was nominated for the Rising Stars Award.
- 2009 Taipei Film Festival, Somewhere I Have Never Traveled was nominated for the Taipei Award.
- 33rd Hong Kong International Film Festival, Somewhere I Have Never Traveled was nominated for the FIPRESCI Award for Young Asian Cinema.
- 33rd Hong Kong International Film Festival, Somewhere I Have Never Traveled was nominated for the SIGNIS Award.
- 2nd Okinawa International Movie Festival in the Peace Category.
