= List of Future GPX Cyber Formula episodes =

Future GPX Cyber Formula (新世紀GPX(フューチャーグランプリ)サイバーフォーミュラ) is an anime series produced by Sunrise that aired in Japan from March 15 to December 20, 1991, on Nippon Television with 37 episodes. The TV series was followed by four OVA titles that were produced from 1992 to 1998 with a total of 27 episodes. The opening and ending themes of the TV series are "I'll Come" and "Winners," performed by G-GRIP.

== Episodes ==
=== Future GPX Cyber Formula (TV series) ===
No.	Title	Directed by	Written by	Storyboarded by	Original release date
1	"The Day Destiny was Decided"; Transliteration: "Unmei o kimeta hi" (Japanese: 運命を決めた日)	Satoshi Nishimura	Hiroyuki Hoshiyama	Mitsuo Fukuda	March 15, 1991
Sugo Asurada, a weak team, plans to introduce a new machine "Asurada G.S.X." for Fujioka Qualifying, where they will compete for the right to participate in the All Japan Grand Prix. However, while transporting the machine, they are suddenly attacked by a mysterious helicopter. Hayato Kazami, who was accompanying the team on his motorcycle, is forced to deliver Asurada to Fujioka Circuit by himself under the tense situation. As a novice driver, Hayato struggles to handle the cyber machine, but he manages to arrive just in time for the inspection deadline. However, as the race is about to start the next day, Hayato discovers that he has been registered as a driver for Asurada.
2	"The Birth of the Youngest Racer"; Transliteration: "Sainenshō rēsā tanjō" (Japanese: 最年少レーサー誕生)	Mihiro Yamaguchi	Hiroyuki Hoshiyama	Kazuki Akane	March 22, 1991
Asurada's driver registration system is so complicated that it takes at least a week to try to deactivate it. With the race just around the corner, Akira Hiyoshi, the team's official driver, is no longer able to compete with Asurada. The team is left to decide whether to give up on their dream of winning the All-Japan Grand Prix and abandon the race, or whether Hayato, an amateur driver, will compete. But the Cyber Formula Grand Prix is not so lenient as to allow an amateur to win. Hayato is deeply depressed due to causing trouble for his team members, even if it was only an accident. Asurada tells Hayato that although his chances of winning are very low, they are not zero. With these words in mind, Hayato finally decides to participate in the race.
3	"Burn, Hayato!"; Transliteration: "Moero! Hayato" (Japanese: 燃えろ！ハヤト)	Yoshitaka Fujimoto	Tsunehisa Itō	Yoshitaka Fujimoto	March 29, 1991
Hayato is about to take on the challenge of his first race. However, the unexpected G-forces on his body and the frustration of not being able to control the car as he wants wear him down both mentally and physically. In contrast to Hayato, Naoki Shinjō of Aoi Formula shows amazing driving in his first race. When Hayato encounters Shinjō on the course, he becomes furious and chases after him, causing a near-crash. However, Maki, who analyzed the driving line at the time of contact, reveals that Hayato unknowingly performed a gas pedal turn, one of the techniques used on a motorcycle. Hayato, who had always wanted to be a motorcycle racer, applies the sensation of riding a motorcycle and gradually gets the hang of operating the Cyber Formula and passes the qualifying round despite coming in last.
4	"Fujioka Grand Prix Finals"; Transliteration: "Fujioka guranpuri kesshō" (Japanese: 富士岡グランプリ決勝)	Jōhei Matsuura	Michiru Shimada	Jōhei Matsuura	April 5, 1991
Finally, the finals began. However, Hayato, who was pointed out by Aoi's owner, Kyōko Aoi, that his driving was not up to par, was unable to get going. In a normal racing manner, a lapped car must give up the line to the leader, but Hayato, who is so engrossed in the battle for last place, does not give up the line to Shinjō, but instead, rolls into him and runs off the course. Shinjō, who was trying to regain the lead, was closing in on the top position at a tremendous pace. Hayato, watching from the pit, has Asurada trace Shinjō's lean driving line and attempts to make a major comeback.
5	"Aim for the All-Japan Grand Prix!"; Transliteration: "Mezase! Zen'nihon guranpuri" (Japanese: 目指せ！全日本グランプリ)	Takeshi Ashizawa	Toshirō Ōyama	Yukihiro Shino	April 12, 1991
The Sugo team heads overland to Hokkaido to compete in the All Japan Grand Prix at the Niseko Circuit. The trip goes smoothly, but at a service area they stop along the way, they happen to find a girl who is the victim of a kidnapping that was reported in a news flash. Hayato's group succeeds in seizing the man they believe to be responsible for the kidnapping, but the man, Bleed Kaga, is not the real kidnapper. Taking advantage of the confusion, the kidnapper escapes in Kaga's suspected car with the girl as a hostage. Hayato pursues them with Asurada. Kaga also gets in the passenger seat of Asurada to retrieve his own machine. However, Kaga's machine, Proto Jaguar, is a formidable machine even for an amateur driver. Kaga, impatient with Hayato's conservative driving, obtains data from Asurada and gives him driving instructions one after another, and succeeds in bringing the car to a halt. Hayato is told that the driving techniques advised by Kaga were from the crash race.
6	"The Nature Boy from Hokkaidō"; Transliteration: "Hokkaidō no shizen-ji" (Japanese: 北海道の自然児)	Satoshi Nishimura	Yoshimasa Takahashi	Satoshi Nishimura	April 19, 1991
Pei, Maki, and the other crew members were eagerly practicing tire changes. Maki, who specializes in data analysis, was completely out of his field of expertise, but with the current manpower shortage, he had to make do with the crew he had on hand. Hayato, inspired by Maki's late-night, singlehanded efforts to improve his time, went out to practice to overcome his weakness in cornering. However, as if waiting for them, a mysterious army of vehicles attacks Hayato and Asurada. Hayato desperately tries to escape, but his lax cornering puts him in a tough spot. Then, Jōji Ōtomo, whom Hayato had just met that morning, appears in his Albatrander and advises Hayato on the timing of cornering. It worked, and Hayato was able to successfully shake off the pursuing vehicles and overcome the cornering.
7	"A License to the World"; Transliteration: "Sekai e no raisensu" (Japanese: 世界へのライセンス)	Yoshitaka Fujimoto	Hiroyuki Hoshiyama	Yoshitaka Fujimoto	April 26, 1991
Hayato performs well in the qualifying round of the All Japan Grand Prix. However, Edelhi Bootsvorz stands in his way as a new assassin. He is determined to crush Hayato and take Asurada. After the race starts, Hayato is immediately attacked by Bootsvorz, and an intense dogfight develops on the circuit. Ōtomo, who told Hayato that the tires will change the outcome of the race, enters the pit stop as early as the second lap. Hayato also ignored Asurada's opposition to enter the pit stop, and had Miki and her teammates prepare rain tires. The pit crew was perplexed by this disadvantageous action, which could only result in a loss of position, especially in a situation where the weather conditions were not worsening. However, as soon as they switched to rain tires, the rain began to fall. It was a victory for Ōtomo's sensitivity to read nature and for Hayato's faith in his ability to do so. With the rain tires that he switched to just in time, Hayato rapidly improved his position in the standings.
8	"Rainy Niseko Finals"; Transliteration: "Ame no Niseko kesshō" (Japanese: 雨のニセコ決勝)	Yutaka Takeda	Tsunehisa Itō	Yukihiro Shino	May 10, 1991
The circuit was in turmoil due to the sudden downpour. With the other cars entering the pit stop at the drop of a hat, Hayato and Ōtomo, who were the first to do so, took advantage of the situation. While the two were far ahead of the others, Shinjō was the only one who calmly sensed the situation and boldly made a one-lap pass to change to rain tires. Bootsvorz's interference did not go his way, and he retired from the race. Jackie Gudelhian and Franz Heinel, who were expected to be invited to the race, also retired, and they had a fight instead of racing, making for a rough race. Despite being one lap behind, Shinjō overcame the pit stop chaos and kept his 3rd place position with a smooth tire change. He was able to keep up with Ōtomo in 1st place and Hayato in 2nd place. Shinjō's driving technique and a one-step early change to slick tires helped him to jump up even further. Finally, he overtakes Hayato and Ōtomo to take the top position. Hayato's fighting spirit was also on fire as he knew that he would be able to compete in the World Grand Prix if he finished in the top three and won the Super License. In a desperate attempt to finish in third place, he boosted his car and even burst the front tire, forcing his way to the finish line. Hayato succeeds in landing 3rd place on his own.
9	"Stormy Departure"; Transliteration: "Arashi no tabidachi" (Japanese: 嵐の旅立ち)	Jōhei Matsuura	Toshirō Ōyama	Jōhei Matsuura	May 17, 1991
To save money, Sugo takes the sea route by boat to the Grand Canyon in the U.S., the stage of the first round of the World Grand Prix. Hayato and his friends enjoy a relaxing sea trip. There, Hayato and Asuka Sugō confide their concerns to each other. Hayato's parents are unreachable, and Asuka's brother, Osamu, has disappeared. As the team's tension gradually increases in preparation for the first round, Pei is injured while performing maintenance. Moreover, the blood needed for the transfusion was of a special type, so the team had to go to the U.S. military base, which was two hours away one way, to get it. Pei's life is in danger. Hayato decides to transport Pei by sea in Asurada, and has Miki and the others convert Asurada into a water-powered vehicle, which Pei is then loaded onto. In the rough seas, Hayato sprints to Pei's rescue. The fight pays off, and Pei survives.
10	"The World Grand Prix Opens"; Transliteration: "Wārudoguranpuri kaisai" (Japanese: ワールドグランプリ開催)	Takeshi Ashizawa	Hiroyuki Hoshiyama	Jun Fukuda	May 24, 1991
The Sugo team arrives at the Grand Canyon in the United States. Hayato and his team decided to have dinner at a drive-in and were excited about tomorrow's race. Knight Schumacher, a masked British racer, was staring at them from a table far away. Schumacher looks as if he has known Hayato and Asuka for a long time. Unbeknownst to Hayato and the others, the situation was progressing. Hayato returns from his meal and starts working. Asuka was about to offer something to Hayato when she spotted a mysterious figure in the shadows of a tree, asking about the situation. A tense atmosphere enveloped Hayato. In addition, a mysterious phone call came in telling Hayato that he absolutely had to win the Grand Prix, which heightened the tension between Hayato and the others. Meanwhile, the Grand Prix opened its doors and the battle of the qualifying rounds was about to begin.
11	"U.S.A. Round 1 Finals"; Transliteration: "Amerika dai 1-sen kesshō" (Japanese: アメリカ第1戦決勝)	Tetsuya Nakamura	Yoshimasa Takahashi	Motosuke Takahashi	May 31, 1991
The first round of the Cyber Formula World Championship was finally held at the Grand Canyon in the United States. Hayato shows tremendous enthusiasm as it is his first time to compete in the world championship, a big stage. He showed a brilliant performance that was hard to believe for a beginner, and jumped to the top in a commotion right after the start of the race. The Sugo crew was happy to get off to a good start in the Grand Prix, but Hayato was given a 60-second penalty for his false start. Hayato is eager to catch up, but his rivals put him under pressure to catch up. The 60-second penalty leads to further tragedy.
12	"The Glorious Racer"; Transliteration: "Eikō no rēsā" (Japanese: 栄光のレーサー)	Kazuki Akane	Michiru Shimada	Kazuki Akane	June 7, 1991
The disappointing loss in the first round shook the team's relationship of mutual trust. The conflict between Hayato and his crewmates heats up as Hayato insists on his own legitimacy, and finally, unable to admit his own faults, he runs away from the team. Hayato wanders the streets without a place to return to, and gets tangled up with a customer at a bar and passes out. The man who tangled with Hayato is former CF World Champ John Cleeve. The next morning, Hayato wakes up in John's house, and John tries to teach him a lesson, saying that a man who has run away from the racing world cannot understand his own feelings, but Hayato lashes out at him. However, when Hayato learns the real reason for John's retirement, he rushes to the venue of the bicycle race in which John is competing. Hayato is moved by John's struggle and realizes how naïve he has been.
13	"Survival Race"; Transliteration: "Sabaibaru rēsu" (Japanese: サバイバルレース)	Yoshitaka Fujimoto	Toshirō Ōyama	Yoshitaka Fujimoto	June 14, 1991
Kaga suddenly appeared in front of Hayato and his teammates to scout for Hayato as a partner to participate in a "farce race," which is not a regular race run by FICCY. His teammates are vehemently opposed to participating in a crash race with no rules, but with Kurumada's permission, Hayato is allowed to participate in the crash race. Gray and his team of mechanics were a group of ruffians, and the race was so fierce that the slightest carelessness could result in death. Hayato is overwhelmed by the surprises, and Kaga encourages him. Hayato takes Kaga's advice and gradually learns the tricks of the race.
14	"Youthful Scrap"; Transliteration: "Seishun sukurappu" (Japanese: 青春スクラップ)	Satoshi Nishimura	Tsunehisa Itō	Satoshi Nishimura	June 21, 1991
Since the second round was expected to be a tough rally race, Miki and Pei upgraded Asurada to a rally type. During the test run, Asurada seemed to be behaving strangely when cornering. However, there was nothing out of the ordinary, and Asurada itself was judged to be fine, but Hayato was the only one who felt something strange about the car's frame. Pei and Hayato are at odds with each other, refusing to budge on their respective claims. At one point, Kurumada tells Pei that he had a similar experience when he was a mechanic, and the loupe that Kurumada received from his mentor helps Pei regain his initial resolution, which he had almost forgotten.
15	"A Promise to a Girl"; Transliteration: "Shōjo to no yakusoku" (Japanese: 少女との約束)	Jōhei Matsuura	Toshirō Ōyama	Jōhei Matsuura	June 28, 1991
The second round is held in Peru. Hayato and Asuka take a walk around the venue before the main event and meet a girl in a wheelchair, Rita, who says she is a fan of Cyber Formula. Rita is already able to walk without a wheelchair, but she is too anxious to accept this fact and is unable to let go of her wheelchair. Hayato wants to help Rita, so he goes around to each of the racers to ask for their autographs. Hayato also promised to finish third on Rita's birthday, which falls on the same day as the race. Hayato is determined to show his fighting spirit to Rita, who has promised to walk if he finishes in the top three.
16	"Peru Round 2 Finals"; Transliteration: "Perū dai 2-sen kesshō" (Japanese: ペルー第2戦決勝)	Hiroyuki Itō	Michiru Shimada	Tsuneo Tominaga	July 5, 1991
The second round in Peru, divided into the first and second parts. During the race, Hayato hums a song for Rita's birthday. The momentary lapse is intercepted by Bootsvorz, who has been after Asurada for some time, and Hayato and Asurada fall down a cliff. Hayato steps out of the car to restore the cyber system, but he slips and falls further down, temporarily losing his sight. Everyone predicted Hayato's retirement, but Asurada, trying to let him know where he was, tactfully sang a song he had just learned. Influenced by Hayato's passionate spirit, who made a spectacular comeback and made an amazing catch-up, Rita finally rises to her feet in the midst of cheering.
17	"The Concert of Friendship"; Transliteration: "Yūjō no konsāto" (Japanese: 友情のコンサート)	Takeshi Ashizawa	Hiroyuki Hoshiyama	Yukihiro Shino	July 12, 1991
The third round was held in Brazil. This course was famous as one of the fastest circuits in the world. The Sugo team adjusts Asurada to high-speed specifications. Miki gave up a concert by her favorite girl band "G-GRIP" for the maintenance. Before joining Sugo, Miki had a dream of becoming a mechanic, and when she could not get a good response from any team, she was encouraged by G-GRIP's songs. When Hayato, Maki, and the other teammates learn of this, they devise a plan to help Miki. Hayato, Maki, and Asuka, posing as press, entered the concert hall and began to videotape the event. Watching the tape presented to her, Miki was deeply moved by the kindness of her teammates.
18	"A High-Speed Trap"; Transliteration: "Chō kōsoku no wana" (Japanese: 超高速の罠)	Kazuki Akane	Tsunehisa Itō	Kazuki Akane	July 19, 1991
The third round of the season opens in Brazil. Hayato and his teammates are reunited with Hiyoshi, the driver who left Sugo at Fujioka. Meanwhile, Smith, who is targeting Asurada's cyber system using Bootsvorz, has issued a new sabotage order. Taking advantage of a squall that begins to fall in the middle of the race, Bootsvorz takes a swing at Asurada. Schumacher notices this earlier and tries to save Hayato by putting his body on the line, causing both of them to crash. Hayato tries to run up to him, but Schumacher holds him back, and he takes his feelings into consideration and returns to the race.
19	"Brazil Round 3 Finals"; Transliteration: "Burajiru dai 3-sen kesshō" (Japanese: ブラジル第3戦決勝)	Tetsuya Nakamura	Yoshimasa Takahashi	Motosuke Takahashi	July 26, 1991
The race had been yellow-flagged earlier due to the accident between Schumacher and Bootsvorz. While his rivals are heating up with fighting spirit, Hayato was the only one who was unable to concentrate because he was worried about Schumacher, who had abandoned the race to save him. Kurumada, in response, urges Hayato to run his own race, and says that this is the only way he can repay Schumacher. Hayato felt a sense of guilt toward Hiyoshi as well, but now that it was important to focus on the race, he concentrated on his goal of getting to the top.
20	"Memories of the Pendant"; Transliteration: "Pendanto no omoide" (Japanese: ペンダントの思い出)	Hiroyuki Itō	Yoshimasa Takahashi	Tsuneo Tominaga	August 2, 1991
The Sugo team enters Canada, where Round 4 will be held. Asuka is given one day of free time by Kurumada to visit "Wish Waterfall," a place she remembers visiting with her family when she was a child. Asuka tells her life story to Schumacher, who shows up by chance. Schumacher suggests that they go to an amusement park together. Meanwhile, Smith has found out Schumacher's true identity. He says that he is Osamu Sugō, a Japanese racer who used to belong to the same team as Bootsvorz. Asuka begins to feel that Schumacher, who spent the day with her, is actually her brother Osamu who disappeared.
21	"Schumacher's Real Identity"; Transliteration: "Shūmahha no shōtai" (Japanese: シューマッハの正体)	Yoshitaka Fujimoto	Tsunehisa Itō	Yoshitaka Fujimoto	August 9, 1991
Smith ordered Bootsvorz to assassinate Schumacher, an obstacle to his own ambitions. However, Bootsvorz refuses the order and vows not to be a part of Smith in any way from now on. He then challenges Schumacher to a serious match as a racer. Hayato and Asuka were watching the battle, following it with Asurada. However, just before the finish line, Smith's helicopter suddenly attacked near the observatory. Bootsvorz, who had escaped the predicament by a hair's breadth with Asurada, crashed his own machine into the helicopter. The helicopter crashed along with Smith. Asuka rushes to Schumacher, who is knocked down by the attack, and sees her brother under the broken sunglasses.
22	"The Secret of Asurada"; Transliteration: "Asurāda no himitsu" (Japanese: アスラーダの秘密)	Takeshi Ashizawa	Hiroyuki Hoshiyama	Takeshi Ashizawa	August 16, 1991
Kōjirō, Asuka's father, and Junko, Hayato's mother, rushed to the hospital alongside their children to visit Osamu. There, Hayato and the others learn of the death of his father, Hiroyuki. Osamu also told them that Hiroyuki had been assassinated by Smith when he tried to smuggle Asurada to Japan, fearing military misuse of its cyber system, and that he had become Schumacher in an attempt to foil Smith's ambitions while Junko had hidden herself to fend off Smith's pursuit. Upon learning all of this, they were all at a loss for words, and Hayato could only sob bitterly at the unexpected death of his father.
23	"Canada Round 4 Finals"; Transliteration: "Kanada dai 4-sen kesshō" (Japanese: カナダ第4戦決勝)	Yasumi Mikamoto	Hiroyuki Hoshiyama	Kazuki Akane	September 6, 1991
Bootsvorz apologized to Hayato for his past conduct and vowed to play fair from now on. Upon learning of his father's death, Hayato acted unnaturally cheerful. Seeing this, Kurumada advised Hayato to abstain, but he insisted on competing. The qualifying round 4 in Canada began. Hayato got off to a good start, but during the race he had a vision of his father, and ignoring Asurada's instructions, boosted acceleration on a corner. He went off course and Asurada was wrecked, while Hayato broke down in tears. Having put their feelings to rest, Hayato and the Sugo team travel to England to acquire the new machine left behind by Hiroyuki.
24	"Reborn! The New Machine My Father Left"; Transliteration: "Tanjō! Chichi no nokoshita nyūmashin" (Japanese: 誕生！父の遺したニューマシン)	Satoshi Nishimura	Toshirō Ōyama	Satoshi Nishimura	September 13, 1991
When the team arrived in England, they found a new machine in the Kazami family garage that Hiroyuki had originally wanted to install Asurada. There were traces of a house search that must have belonged to Smith, but fortunately, the machine had been left untouched before the system was installed. The team immediately began implanting the cyber system part of Asurada's main body, but access was denied by security. They used a disk in Junko's possession at the time of Hiroyuki's death, but it required a password. Every keyword he can think of is tried, but none are recognized. That night, Hayato talks with his mother for the first time in a while, and suddenly remembers something his father used to say. Hayato reaffirms his father's dream and feels a burning sensation in his heart.
25	"Intense Driving! Super Asurada"; Transliteration: "Gekisō! Sūpā Asurāda" (Japanese: 激走！スーパーアスラーダ)	Hiroyuki Itō	Yoshimasa Takahashi	Motosuke Takahashi	September 20, 1991
Round 5 is a special circuit at Postbridge Airport in England. Osamu and Asuka, who had been delayed due to injuries, were finally about to arrive in England. However, the passenger plane carrying them has a wheel failure and has to make a dangerous fuselage landing. Hayato proposed to catch up with the airliner with the boost of the Super Asurada and hit the radar satellite to bring the wheels down. Under difficult circumstances in terms of timing and ejection angle, Hayato successfully hit the hatch in coordination with Asurada. At the qualifying round held the next day, people are more interested in Hayato for saving the plane crash than in Shinjō, the Canadian GPX winner. Shinjō, not amused, tries to show the difference in their abilities, but is beaten to the punch, and Hayato takes his first pole position.
26	"The 27-Second Challenge! Round 5 Finals"; Transliteration: "27-Byō ni kakero! Dai 5-sen kesshō" (Japanese: 27秒にかけろ！第5戦決勝)	Yoshitaka Fujimoto	Tsunehisa Itō	Yoshitaka Fujimoto	September 27, 1991
Hayato started the race well, winning his first pole. However, during the race, Hayato felt something strange in Asurada. Apparently, the cyber system was not yet matched to the chassis. Furthermore, a large hailstorm that fell halfway through the race hit the hydraulic cylinder of Asurada, causing the variable system to stop responding. In this race, where off-road, on-road, and high-speed courses are combined, the inability to change the system was an overwhelming disadvantage. Hayato was resourceful and came up with the idea of transforming the system during boost. With the constant danger of engine burst, Hayato continued his tightrope driving and improved his position. He went on to win his first championship.
27	"Confrontation! The 14-Year-Old White Prince"; Transliteration: "Taiketsu! 14-Sai no shiroi kikōshi" (Japanese: 対決！14才の白い貴公子)	Kazuki Akane	Michiru Shimada	Kazuki Akane	October 4, 1991
As a reward for winning his first race, Hayato was given tickets to watch the Cyber Bikers. However, Karl Lichter von Randall, a boy of only 14 years old who won that race, dismisses Cyber Formula as not even worth trying. Unexpectedly, Asuka lashes out at Randall. For Randall, who grew up in a rich family, Asuka was the first girl of her type he had ever met. Randall likes her and invites her to his home. However, Randall sees the deep trust between Hayato and Asuka there and gets jealous, so he challenges Hayato to a one-on-one match at a circuit later. After losing the match, Randall recognizes Hayato as his rival and decides to enter Cyber Formula.
28	"Mortal Combat On Ice! Round 6 Finals"; Transliteration: "Hyōjō no shitō! Dai 6-sen kesshō" (Japanese: 氷上の死闘！第6戦決勝)	Takeshi Ashizawa	Toshirō Ōyama	Takeshi Ashizawa	October 11, 1991
Round 6 was held on an ice-covered circuit in Norway. Randall, making his first entry in this round, wins pole position with an astonishing lap time that surpasses even Shinjō, who is challenging in his new machine, Fire Superion. The rivals were astonished at the appearance of the genius newcomer, who did not give off the impression of a first-time entrant. However, Randall's haughty attitude puts them on the edge of their seats. The main competition finally begins, and Randall shows off his skills. Heinel and Gudelhian, who are antagonistic toward Randall, play rough with Randall in an attempt to greet him in a crude manner, a good teamwork play that shows no sign of their usual cat-dog relationship. Randall, however, was in no hurry to get past them and passed the leaders Shinjō and Hayato to take the win.
29	"Challenge! Fireball"; Transliteration: "Chōsen! Faiābōru" (Japanese: 挑戦！ファイアーボール)	Yasumi Mikamoto	Hiroyuki Hoshiyama; Juttoku Yoshida	Katsuma Kanazawa	October 25, 1991
A girl who calls herself Elena appears before Hayato and his friends. Elena asks Hayato for his help to participate in the Fireball race organized by her father, Gabin. Fireball is a public road race with no rules. Elena wants to wake up her father, who has made even the exchange of life a gamble, and Hayato readily agrees to participate. Miki offers Hayato the GSX that she has been gradually repairing. When Hayato arrives at the venue, he is reunited with a familiar face. When it comes to farce races, it is this man, Bleed Kaga, who excels at them. Kaga promises to let Hayato win the race in exchange for half of the prize money. With Kaga as a reassuring friend, Hayato takes on the dangerous race. The Fireball battle is about to begin.
30	"Fireball Close Call!"; Transliteration: "Faiābōru Kikiippatsu!" (Japanese: ファイアーボール 危機一髪！)	Satoshi Nishimura	Hiroyuki Hoshiyama; Juttoku Yoshida	Satoshi Nishimura	November 1, 1991
The Fireball was a tougher race than expected. Machines specially modified for this race attacked relentlessly. Gabin, who was watching the race, notices that his daughter Elena is participating and pleads with the organizers to cancel the race, but none of them agree. Elena, who is frail by nature, suffers a seizure during the race. Hayato has the cyber-wheel HSR-III come to pick Elena up in the nick of time and take her to the hospital, while he continues to race. Toward the end of the race, Kaga, who was covering for Hayato, crashes his car. Hayato himself is unable to move forward due to obstructions from the car in front of him just before the finish line. At that moment, Kaga took control of a scrapped Proto Jaguar and kicked out the rival car that was blocking Hayato's way. Hayato was able to finish in the top position.
31	"Round 7: Enter Bleed Kaga!"; Transliteration: "Dai 7-sen Burīdo Kaga kenzan!" (Japanese: 第7戦 ブリード加賀見参！)	Hiroyuki Itō	Yoshimasa Takahashi	Motosuke Takahashi	November 8, 1991
Kenya, the stage of the 7th round. Kyōko started a new team, Aoi ZIP Formula, from this round. Bleed Kaga is the driver of the team, and experts from Shinjō's team are selected as the crew. Shinjō is treated as a de facto minor league driver, and he is rough on the new crew, finding fault with all of them. As expected, he is unable to show his ability in the race, and he makes a steering error and collides with Kaga, getting stuck in the muck in the process. He refuses Hayato's offer of help and escapes safely, but finishes in last place. Beaten and exhausted, he returns to the motor home, only to find none of his crew waiting for him there.
32	"Round 7: A Tenacious Finish Line"; Transliteration: "Dai 7-sen shūnen no gōruin" (Japanese: 第7戦 執念のゴールイン)	Yoshitaka Fujimoto	Toshirō Ōyama	Yoshitaka Fujimoto	November 15, 1991
When Miki, who knew Shinjō in his debut days, rebukes that he was much better in his F3 days, Shinjō finally realizes his mistake and sincerely apologizes to Katagiri and his crew, and builds a relationship of trust with them. In the race, in order to catch up, Shinjō raises the machine's power to the limit and proceeds to use a lot of boost, but runs out of fuel. Everyone expected him to retire, but Shinjō did not give up. He began to push the machine by hand, aiming for the goal that was right in front of him. In the end, he missed the victory right in front of him and finished in 5th place, but he recovered completely as a racer. Miki offered Shinjō a rice ball for his efforts.
33	"The Miraculous 8th Round! Mortal Combat on the Big Wave"; Transliteration: "Kiseki no dai 8-sen! Ōnami no shitō" (Japanese: 奇跡の第8戦！大波の死闘)	Kazuki Akane	Michiru Shimada	Kazuki Akane	November 22, 1991
Round 8 was held at the Spanish maritime circuit. After the qualifying round, Randall encounters Asuka on his way shopping in the city. Asuka talks about Hayato all the time, and Randall, burning with rivalry, unilaterally decides that he will get Asuka's kiss if he beats Hayato in the main race. Hayato hears about it on the day of the race, and he fights against Randall by driving without budging an inch. They both drive with boost acceleration even on the Mermaid Straight, where a huge wave comes at them from above and they are right on the edge of the sea. At Cerberus Corner, where the course splits into two halves, the two drivers plunged into the merge point at almost the same time. Just as they were about to collide, Hayato dodged Randall and continued on to the finish line. Randall, who made a driving error, fell into the sea, and Hayato won the race.
34	"Hayato vs. Asurada! Round 9 Finals"; Transliteration: "Hayato tai Asurāda! Dai 9-sen kesshō" (Japanese: ハヤト対アスラーダ！第9戦決勝)	Yoshitaka Fujimoto	Toshirō Ōyama	Motosuke Takahashi	November 29, 1991
Round 9, the pre-last race of the season, is set at a German circuit inside a dome that uses a cyber system. Ōtomo, who was camping near the circuit as usual, invites Hayato and Shinjō, who had come for a preliminary inspection, to his tent. Shinjō is worried about Ōtomo's poor performance in the earlier qualifying round, and Ōtomo confesses that he does not like this circuit, which is controlled by the cyber system. In the finals, Hayato was in great shape, partly due to the support of his trusted Asurada. However, he mistakenly believes that Ōtomo's somewhat unstable driving was an attempt to yield the course to him, and they end up making contact. Ōtomo, who did not trust the cyber system, had turned the system off, causing a major crash. Hayato believes that Asurada's instructions were the cause of Ōtomo's accident, and his distrust of Asurada grows.
35	"The Wounded Racer"; Transliteration: "Kizu-darake no rēsā" (Japanese: 傷だらけのレーサー)	Takeshi Ashizawa	Tsunehisa Itō	Takeshi Ashizawa	December 6, 1991
Ōtomo is taken to the hospital after being seriously injured in a major crash in Round 9. Hayato's suspicions grow that Asurada was the cause of Ōtomo's accident. When Hayato returns to the motor home from the hospital, Maki, who was analyzing the accident, explains that nothing is wrong with Asurada, but Hayato is still not convinced. However, when Hayato learns that Ōtomo's condition is poor and that even if he recovers, it is hopeless for him to return to Cyber Formula, he finally loses patience and attempts to destroy Asurada, but is subdued by the crew members who rush to the scene. When Ōtomo eventually regains consciousness, he tells Hayato that neither Hayato nor Asurada are responsible for anything. Hayato reaffirms the bonds within the team, the trust between him and Asurada, and his mental state, and heads for Japan to challenge the final battle.
36	"The Top 3 Head-On Confrontation! The Japan Grand Prix"; Transliteration: "Sankyō gekitotsu! Nihon guranpuri" (Japanese: 三強激突！日本グランプリ)	Satoshi Nishimura	Hiroyuki Hoshiyama	Satoshi Nishimura	December 13, 1991
With the final decisive battle coming up, all the teams are fully prepared and their fighting spirit is ignited. However, the Sugo team had not fully repaired their Super Asurada since the crash at the last German Grand Prix. Hayato therefore suggested that they drive the GSX from Hokkaido, the starting point of the race, to Urawa, two-thirds of the way through the course, with no mistakes and no refueling. Finally, the final race was about to get underway. Despite his old machine, Hayato had been doing well on the course, but before the first maintenance point, he sustained damage to his radiator. Hayato heads for Urawa, where his friends are waiting for him, but suffers a tire burst just before reaching the first maintenance point, and slides in with sparks flying and running just barely out of time. The waiting crew hurriedly transfers the cyber system to Super Asurada. After receiving advice from Osamu via international phone call, Asuka sends him off and Hayato gets into Super Asurada.
37	"Glorious Winners"; Transliteration: "Eikō no uināzu" (Japanese: 栄光のウイナーズ)	Mitsuo Fukuda	Hiroyuki Hoshiyama	Mitsuo Fukuda	December 20, 1991
Hayato quickly improved his position in Super Asurada, which was set to a higher power output to match the distance traveled. By the time they arrived at Aokigahara, they were within the top contenders. Kaga, who was also battling for the top position, retires before Fujioka, rebelling against unjust instructions from Kyōko. The World Champion was then to be contested by Shinjō, Randall, and Hayato. Finally, the battle is brought to the Fujioka Circuit, where a dead heat develops. Hayato, remembering Osamu's advice, drives through the "Tornado Bank," a difficult section of the circuit where the car is subjected to 6Gs of load, without easing off the gas pedal even though he suffers a "blackout phenomenon" that causes a temporary loss of visibility. The battle between the three had fans from all over the world glued to their seats. With a large crowd watching, the decisive battle now comes to an end. Hayato overtook Shinjō at the Tornado Bank. At that moment, Hayato's consciousness flies out of his body. At the same time, the checkered flag is waved. Hayato crosses the finish line at the top and wins the glory of World Champion. The youngest champion in the history of Cyber Formula was born.
SP	"Future GPX Cyber Formula: Graffiti"; Transliteration: "Fyūchā GPX saibā fōmyura gurafiti" (Japanese: 新世紀GPXサイバーフォーミュラ グラフィティ)	Mitsuo Fukuda	Yūichirō Oguro	N/A	August 5, 1992
A compilation of scenes edited together by Asurada for each driver, looking back on the 10th event in which Hayato won his first championship.

=== Future GPX Cyber Formula 2 (OVA series) ===
Future GPX Cyber Formula 2 is divided into four parts titled 11 (Double One), Zero, Saga and Sin.

==== Future GPX Cyber Formula 11 ====
No.	Title	Directed by	Written by	Storyboarded by	Original release date
1	"The Car Number of Glory"; Transliteration: "Eikō no kānanbā" (Japanese: 栄光のカーナンバー)	Mitsuo Fukuda	Hiroyuki Hoshiyama	Satoshi Nishimura	November 1, 1992
2	"Revival! The Supersonic Knight"; Transliteration: "Fukkatsu! Chōonsoku no kishi" (Japanese: 復活！超音速の騎士)	Mitsuo Fukuda	Mitsuo Fukuda	Mitsuo Fukuda	December 1, 1992
3	"The Birth of the New Asurada"; Transliteration: "Nyū Asurāda tanjō" (Japanese: 新(ニュー)アスラーダ誕生)	Mitsuo Fukuda	Hiroyuki Hoshiyama	Satoshi Nishimura	February 1, 1993
4	"Full Throttle! Inertial Drift"; Transliteration: "Zenkai! Ināsharu dorifuto" (Japanese: 全開！イナーシャルドリフト)	Mitsuo Fukuda	Hiroyuki Hoshiyama	Shōji Kawamori	March 1, 1993
5	"Morning of the Decisive Battle"; Transliteration: "Kessen no asa" (Japanese: 決戦の朝)	Mitsuo Fukuda	Hiroyuki Hoshiyama	Satoshi Nishimura	April 25, 1993
6	"Forever in These Moments..."; Transliteration: "Kono shunkan yo eien ni..." (Japanese: この瞬間よ永遠に･･･)	Mitsuo Fukuda	Mitsuo Fukuda	Mitsuo Fukuda	June 1, 1993

==== Future GPX Cyber Formula ZERO ====
No.	Title	Directed by	Written by	Storyboarded by	Original release date
7	"The Limited Area Nightmare"; Transliteration: "Akumu no genkai ryōiki" (Japanese: 悪夢の限界領域)	Mitsuo Fukuda	Mitsuo Fukuda	Mitsuo Fukuda	April 1, 1994
8	"In the Sunny Place..."; Transliteration: "Hidamari no naka de..." (Japanese: 陽だまりの中で･･･)	Kiyotaka Ōhata	Hiroyuki Hoshiyama	Kiyotaka Ōhata	April 25, 1994
9	"Back to the Circuit"; Transliteration: "Futatabi sākitto e" (Japanese: 再びサーキットへ)	Shinichiro Kimura	Hiroyuki Hoshiyama	Shinichiro Kimura	July 1, 1994
10	"When Pegasus Takes Flight"; Transliteration: "Pegasasu no habataku toki" (Japanese: 天馬（ペガサス）の翔くとき)	Mitsuo Fukuda	Takeshi Ashizawa	Mitsuo Fukuda	August 1, 1994
11	"The Closed Tomorrow"; Transliteration: "Tozasareta ashita" (Japanese: 閉ざされた明日)	Kiyotaka Ōhata	Mitsuo Fukuda	Kenichi Maejima	October 1, 1994
12	"Only for Victory..."; Transliteration: "Tada shōri no tame ni..." (Japanese: ただ勝利の為に･･･)	Mitsuo Fukuda	Takeshi Ashizawa	Mitsuo Fukuda	November 2, 1994
13	"Prelude to the Deadly Battle"; Transliteration: "Shitō e no jokyoku" (Japanese: 死闘への序曲)	Takeshi Ashizawa	Takeshi Ashizawa	Satoshi Nishimura	December 21, 1994
14	"To Our Futures"; Transliteration: "Sorezore no mirai e" (Japanese: それぞれの未来へ)	Mitsuo Fukuda	Mitsuo Fukuda	Mitsuo Fukuda	February 1, 1995

==== Future GPX Cyber Formula SAGA ====
No.	Title	Directed by	Written by	Storyboarded by	Original release date
15	"No Title"	Akira Yoshimura; Mitsuo Fukuda	Chiaki Morosawa	Mitsuo Fukuda	August 1, 1996
16	"Fired!"	Masamitsu Hidaka	Chiaki Morosawa	Masamitsu Hidaka	September 1, 1996
17	"Critical Days"	Akira Yoshimura; Mitsuo Fukuda	Chiaki Morosawa	Masamitsu Hidaka	October 2, 1996
18	"Evening Calm"	Takeshi Ashizawa	Chiaki Morosawa	Masamitsu Hidaka	December 1, 1996
19	"Burning!!"	Masayuki Ōzeki; Takeshi Ashizawa	Chiaki Morosawa	Mitsuo Fukuda	February 1, 1997
20	"Lifting Turn"	Hiroshi Nishikiori; Takeshi Ashizawa	Chiaki Morosawa	Hiroshi Nishikiori	March 20, 1997
21	"Lose His Way"	Takeshi Ashizawa	Chiaki Morosawa	Mitsuo Fukuda	June 1, 1997
22	"Never"	Mitsuo Fukuda	Chiaki Morosawa	Mitsuo Fukuda	July 25, 1997

==== Future GPX Cyber Formula SIN ====
No.	Title	Directed by	Written by	Storyboarded by	Original release date
23	"Undefeatable Legend"; Transliteration: "Fuhai shinwa" (Japanese: 不敗神話)	Mitsuo Fukuda	Chiaki Morosawa	Mitsuo Fukuda; Satoshi Shigeta	December 21, 1998
24	"The Time of Revival"; Transliteration: "Fukkatsu no toki" (Japanese: 復活の刻)	Mitsuo Fukuda	Chiaki Morosawa	Mitsuo Fukuda	February 21, 1999
25	"The Cry of Ogre"; Transliteration: "Ōga no sakebi" (Japanese: 凰呀の叫び)	Mitsuo Fukuda	Chiaki Morosawa	Mitsuo Fukuda; Satoshi Shigeta	July 7, 1999
26	"Winner's Terms"; Transliteration: "Shōsha no jōken" (Japanese: 勝者の条件)	Mitsuo Fukuda	Chiaki Morosawa	Mitsuo Fukuda	September 16, 1999
27	"All in the Midst of Time..."; Transliteration: "Subete wa toki no naka ni..." (Japanese: 全ては時の中に･･･)	Mitsuo Fukuda	Chiaki Morosawa	Mitsuo Fukuda; Satoshi Shigeta	March 17, 2000

=== Future GPX Cyber Formula: Early Days Renewal ===
No.	Title	Directed by	Written by	Storyboarded by	Original release date
1	"Challenger"	Mitsuo Fukuda	Mitsuo Fukuda	April 1, 1996	
A summary of the first half of the TV series with new scenes, re-recorded voice acting, and some story changes.
2	"Winners"	Mitsuo Fukuda	Mitsuo Fukuda	June 1, 1996	
A summary of the second half of the TV series with new scenes, re-recorded voice acting, and some story changes.
