= Kamogawa Horumo =

Kamogawa Horumō
- DVD cover
- Directed by: Katsuhide Motoki
- Written by: Maruo Kyozuka (screenplay); Manabu Makime (novel)
- Starring: Takayuki Yamada; Chiaki Kuriyama
- Cinematography: Shoji Ehara
- Edited by: Isao Kawase
- Music by: Yoshikazu Suo
- Distributed by: Viz Pictures (USA)
- Release date: April 18, 2009
- Running time: 113 minutes
- Country: Japan
- Language: Japanese

Battle League Horumo (Japanese: 鴨川ホルモー, Hepburn: Kamogawa Horumō) is a Japanese fantasy-action-comedy film directed by Katsuhide Motoki.

== Story ==
A group of Kyoto University students known as the “Kyoto University Azure Dragons”, participate in a game called "Horumo". It is an ancient game in which players control shikigami called “oni” and pit them against the oni of rival teams, reminiscent of Pokémon. Akira Abe is a freshman student who falls in love with a classmate named Kyoko, and blindly joins the club and plays the game to be closer to her. Ironically, Kyoko is interested in another club member, while Akira gains the attention of Fumi. The mysterious game started over 1,200 years ago in the Heian Period. Soon the 2,000 oni wage wars battles in the city of Kyoto.

== Cast ==
- Takayuki Yamada as Akira Abe
- Chiaki Kuriyama as Fumi Kusunoki
- Gaku Hamada as Koichi Takamura
- Sei Ashina as Kyoko Sawara
- Takuya Ishida as Mitsuru Ashiya
- Yoshiyoshi Arakawa as Makoto Sugawara
- Tamiyasu Cho as Akahito Kakimoto
- Renji Ishibashi as Berobero Bartender
- Papaya Suzuki as Gensai Suzuki
- Takayo Mimura as Tomiko Ryuzoji
- Megumi Sato as Mika Tachibana
- Masato Wada as Hitoshi Kiyomori
- Keita Saito as Miyoshi Younger Brother
- Shota Saito as Miyoshi Older Brother
