= Okinawa Convention Center =

Convention center in Okinawa, Japan

Coordinates: 26°16′47″N 127°43′59″E

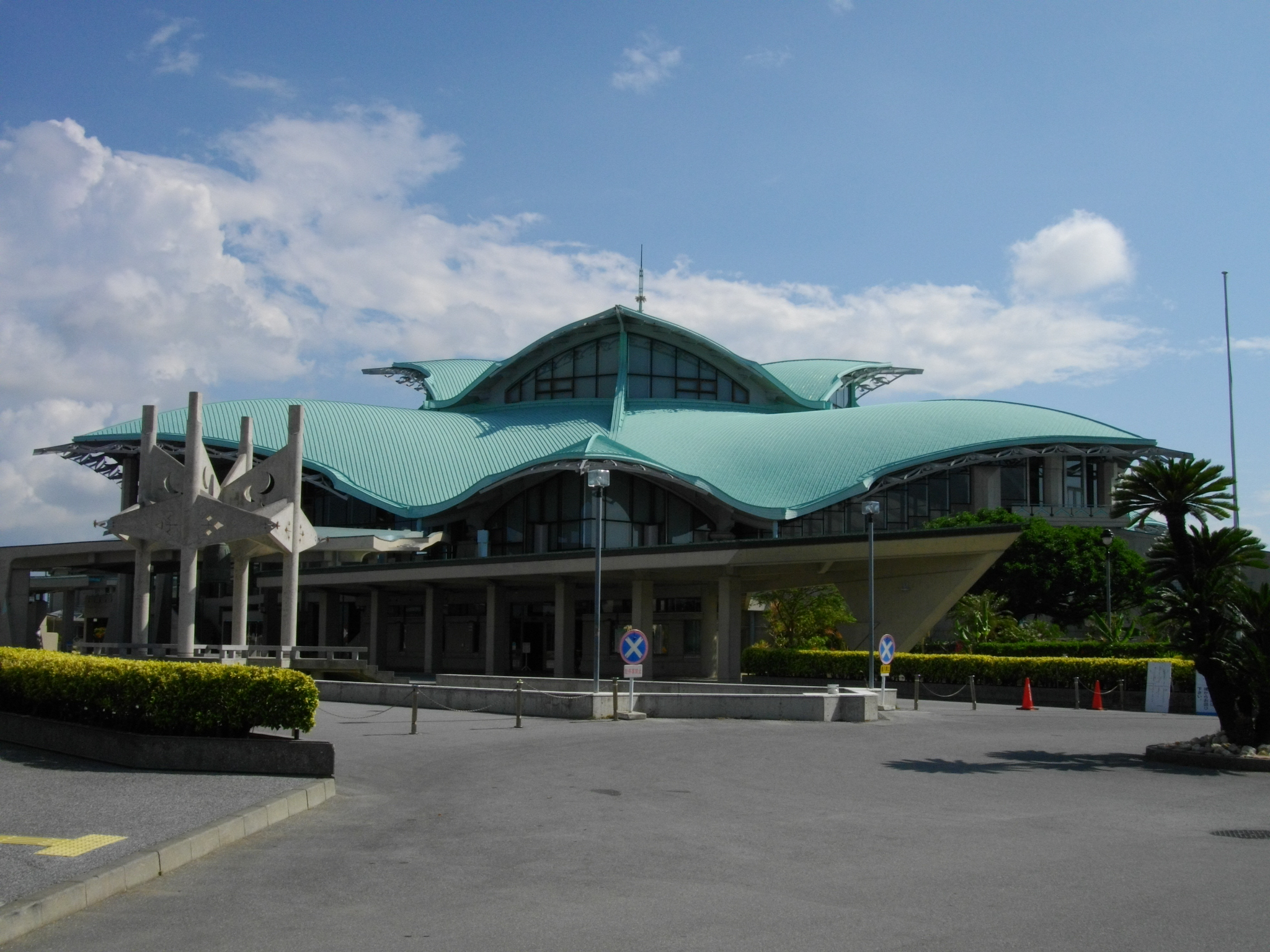
- Interactive map of Okinawa Convention Center
- Full name: Okinawa Convention Center
- Location: Ginowan, Okinawa, Japan
- Owner: Okinawa Prefecture
- Operator: Okinawa Prefecture
- Capacity: 4,120 (arena); 1,709 (theater)

Construction
- Opened: 1987
- Cost

Tenant
- Ryukyu Golden Kings (2007–2016)

The Okinawa Convention Center (沖縄コンベンションセンター, Okinawa Konbenshon Senta) is a multi-purpose convention center in the city of Ginowan, Okinawa Prefecture, Japan. The center was opened in 1987. It has a capacity of 5,000. It is the former home arena of the Ryukyu Golden Kings basketball team.
