= Sugo (disambiguation) =

Sugo is a 2005-2006 Philippine television series.

Sugo may also refer to:

- Sugo Station, a railway station in Takizawa, Iwate, Japan
- Sportsland SUGO, a motorsports facility in Murata, Miyagi, Japan
- Sugo Corporation, a fictional company in the Japanese anime series Future GPX Cyber Formula
  - Asuka Sugō, a fictional character in the series
  - Osamu Sugō, a fictional character in the series
- Sugo, a 1976 album by Eugenio Finardi
- Sugó, the Hungarian name for Șugău village, Sighetu Marmației city, Maramureș County, Romania
- Sugo, an Italian word that sometimes refers to tomato sauce

People with the surname

- Takayuki Sugō (born 1952), Japanese voice actor
- Masaki Suda (born 1993, as Taisho Sugo), Japanese actor
