= Chimpui =

1985 manga created by Fujiko F. Fujio

- Volume 1 of the Chimpui manga

チンプイ
- Manga
- Written by: Fujiko F. Fujio (Note: Previously credited under the name Fujiko Fujio until 1988.)
- Published by: Chūōkōron-sha
- Imprint: F. F. Land Special
- Magazine: Fujiko Fujio Land
- Original run: June 1985 – February 1991
- Volumes: 4
- Anime television series
- Directed by: Mitsuru Hongo (chief)
- Produced by: Junichi Kimura (TV Asahi); Yoshiaki Koizumi (TV Asahi); Yasuo Kameyama (Asatsu); Sōichi Besshi; Hitoshi Mogi
- Music by: Kohei Tanaka
- Studio: Shin-Ei Animation
- Original network: ANN (TV Asahi)
- English network: SEA: Disney Channel
- Original run: November 2, 1989 – April 18, 1991
- Episodes: 56
- Anime film

Chinpui: Eri-sama Katsudō Daishashin
- Directed by: Mitsuru Hongo
- Written by: Akira Okeya
- Music by: Kohei Tanaka
- Studio: Shin-Ei Animation
- Released: March 10, 1990
- Runtime: 40 minutes
- Anime film

Chinpui: Eri-sama no Good Luck
- Directed by: Nobutaka Yoda
- Written by: Azusa Serikawa
- Music by: Zo Zhit
- Studio: Shin-Ei Animation
- Released: May 21, 2025

Chimpui (Japanese: チンプイ, Hepburn: Chinpui) is a Japanese manga created by Fujiko F. Fujio in 1985. It tells the story of two aliens that come to Earth to find the girl who will marry their prince of planet Mahl and find one in sixth grade named Eri. It was subsequently adapted into an anime.

Chimpui is the last children's manga to be created by Fujiko F. Fujio.

== Characters ==
- Chimpui (チンプイ), a mouse-like alien, who tells about the prince's marriage to a girl named Eri. Sometimes he tries to convince Eri to marry the prince and helps Eri on Earth or while on Mahl. He is voiced by Junko Hori.
- Eri Kasuga (春日エリ, Kasuga Eri), a 12-year-old Chinese-Japanese (via her ancestor, Kukuru from Doraemon: Nobita and the Birth of Japan) sixth grade tomboy and also Chimpui's best friend. She is a healthy person. She is voiced by Megumi Hayashibara.
- Wanderyu (ワンダユウ, Wandaryu) a dog-like alien, who is Chimpui's sidekick. He also helps Eri, but sometimes she hates him. Eri calls him "Grandpa Wada". He is voiced by Jōji Yanami.
- Uchiki Sho (内木翔, Sho Uchiki) is a sixth grade student who is good at studies but is weak at sports. He is Eri's best friend and Eri has a crush on him. He dreams of becoming an astronaut one day. He is voiced by Sasaki Nozomu.
- Sunemi Koganeyama (小金山スネ美, Koganeyama Sunemi) is Eri's friend who comes from a wealthy family.
- Masao Oeyama (大江山政男, Oeyama Masao) is a strong-willed sixth grade student who is good at sports and bullies Uchiki. He is voiced by Daiki Nakamura.
- Masao Koyama (小山政夫, Koyama Masao) is a sixth grade schoolboy who has a similar-looking name like Masao Oeyama. He is voiced by Jun'ichi Kanemaru.
- Hotaru Fujino (藤野ほたる, Fujino Hotaru) and Sayaka Hata (秦さやか, Hata Sayaka) are Eri's classmates.
- Prince Lulealv (ルルロフ殿下, Rururofu) is a unseen prince who only appears in Eri's dreams.

== Media ==
=== Anime ===
The series premiered on TV Asahi from November 2, 1989, to April 18, 1991, then aired in Europe and Asia in 1991 into multiple languages. It also aired on Disney Channel Asia.

EP#	English title	Synopsis
1	The game is about to begin (エリさま、おめでとう) / Enjoying with friends (おもちゃもラーメンを食べる)	Chimpui and Wanderyu break into Eri's house to help her. Later, a salesman arrives and convinces Eri to buy the audio tapes but Eri later realise the man was a thug and seeks help from Chimpui / Eri seeks help from Chimpui in cleaning. She introduces Chimpui to Uchiki. Later, Eri introduces Chimpui to her mother as her new toy, so that she could keep Chimpui at home.
2	Watching a film (エリさま、花のように) / Is it a dream or reality? (御先祖は日本王?)	Wanderyu searches for a TV to show Eri Planet Mahl and finds out that Mrs Kasugi has been busy watching her program. Chimpui finds out ways to divert Mrs Kasugi's attention, so that they Eri can watch Planet Mahl through TV / Wanderyu continues to convince Eri and her father to meet the prince. Later, Mr Kasugi questions her about Wanderyu, but Eri tells him it was just a dream.
3	Having fun with Chimpui / Helping in the household chores.	Eri seeks help from Chimpui to clean the garden and escapes to play. Chimpui, Eri and Uchiki visit an island and spend a great time together. They return with snaps to show Sunemi ma'am but misplace the camera / Chimpui gives Eri some magical powers to complete the household chores. But Eri misuses them. After the power fades, Eri is forced to do all the work by herself.
4	True friendship can never be parted / Chimpui's fear of cats	Wanderyu blackmails Uchiki to convince Eri to go to planet Mahl and gives him a magical sweet. Uchiki refuses to eat the sweet as he didn't want to lose Eri / Chimpui and Eri get invisible with magical powers and bring home a cat. Chimpui feels sad and decides to go away as he is afraid of cats. Later, Eri finds Chimpui at Uchiki's place and reconciles with him.
5	Treasure hunt / Eri! A baker.	Chimpui and Eri find ways to search money, to eat something. While they go in search of money, they come across a thief and get him arrested. Later, they find some money in their house / Eri burns the cookies while baking, so she decides to bake them again. Wanderyu gives Eri's cookies to Uchiki. Next day, Eri gets very happy to hear that Uchiki found the cookies delicious.
6	Let the toys do the work / Annual day performance.	Chimpui installs a computer chip in Eri's toy to get her homework done. Eri uses the chip in all her stuff toys to make them powerful and get her work done, but later gets into trouble / Eri participates in the school play for the annual day. Wanderyu threatens Chimpui to let Eri play the main lead in the drama, Chimpui uses his magical powers and makes Eri and Uchiki the prince and princess.
7	Parents wedding anniversary / Eri becomes responsible.	Eri and Chimpui fulfil Mrs Kasugi wish of getting a magazine and a ring on her wedding anniversary by using a magical paper given by Wanderyu / Eri decides to weave a muffler for Uchiki. Next morning, Eri gifts Uchiki the muffler she weaved and gets a gift from her parents for being responsible.
8	Do not fight at home / Christmas celebration.	A detective sets a plan against Eri and her mother so that they fight. In anger, Eri leaves her house and goes to Uchiki's place. Uchiki makes her understand and asks her to return home / Chimpui fulfils Eri's wish by making her the Santa Claus, and invites all her friends for Christmas party. Wanderyu surprises the kids by creating artificial snow. They all enjoy the Christmas celebration.
9	The original and duplicate game / Difficulties because of dreams.	Wanderyu asks Chimpui to click a picture of Eri so he could show it to the people of his planet. While Eri troubles Oeyama, Chimpui clicks good pictures of Eri and gives it to Wanderyu / Eri gets worried about her dream and decides to not let it come true. Later, Eri and Chimpui find out that the dream was Wanderyu's plan and decides that he was going to get the taste of his medicine.
10	Participating in the drawing competition / Malchino's new plan.	Eri gets worried about participating in the drawing competition but Wanderyu appreciates Eri's painting and makes her happy. She presents her drawing in the competition and wins a prize / As Eri leaves from home, Malchino takes advantage of the situation and gives her some magical powers but she gets into trouble while using them. Chimpui manages to save Eri at the right time.
11	Eri and her brother / Health checkup.	Chimpui fulfils Eri's wish of having a brother by giving her a device. While on a walk, Eri's brother saves Uchiki from Oeyama / The prince sends a doctor to examine Eri's health but she chases him away. While going out for a movie, Eri finds out that her father is sick and seeks help from the doctor in getting him well.
12	Eri's struggle for a new dress / Eri and Uchiki's space tour.	Eri promises Yuri Kasugi that she will do the household chores, to get a dress for herself. On seeing Eri complete her homework and household chores, Mrs Kasugi decides to buy a new dress for her / Wanderyu thinks of ideas to stop Eri from meeting Uchiki. As Eri's movie plan gets cancelled, Wanderyu sends Eri and Uchiki on a space tour in the egg to make her happy.
13	Eri! The super heroine / Guest at home.	Eri takes help from Chimpui and becomes a super heroine to save Uchiki. Eri finds out various reasons to save Uchiki but always reaches late at the place / After Eri leaves for school, Tharusa breaks in Eri's room in search of evidence against her. Tharusa tries all possible ways to harm Eri but Chimpui saves her. Later, Eri decides to let Tharusa be the princess.
14	Leaning to ski / Let's create a doll house.	An alien guest helps Eri in learning to ski with the help of his techniques. Eri enjoys herself and has a great time. After reaching home, Mr and Mrs Kasugi take Eri along for skiing / Eri buys a male doll from a shop with the money that her uncle gifts her. Wanderyu surprises Eri with a big male doll, but she refuses to accept the gift. She creates a doll house with the help of Chimpui.
15	Eri saves Uchiki from trouble / Cloud that gets your sadness away.	As Uchiki and Chimpui get trapped in Wanderyu's magical cards, Eri gets into the cards and saves them as a warrior. And Wanderyu clicks Eri's picture to show to the prince / Wanderyu presents Eri with a cloud to get rid of her sadness. As Hotaru feels sad, she rests on the cloud and goes into the air. Eri and her friends get worried in search of Hotaru, but feel happy on seeing Hotaru happy.
16	Returning to the planet / Love! The biggest problem.	Wanderyu invites Chimpui and Eri for a celebration on behalf of the prince, Uchiki joins them. While enjoying, Eri realises that they have to return home immediately / After Eri's parents leave, Maniro and Kiki visit Eri's place to meet Chimpui. Maniro and Kiki insist Eri to show them her town, so that they could spend time together and click pictures to show the prince.
17	Feeding Pio Pio / Problem solved by tuning.	Pio Pio visits earth to meet Eri, but Eri refuses to feed them. When Mr Kasugi goes to give food in charity, Wanderyu and Chimpui take the food bag from him and gives to Pio Pio on behalf of Eri / Eri and Chimpui manage to fnd an owner for the dog they find. Later, Shosei tells Eri that the owner of the dog wants the dog back. With Wanderyu's help, Eri returns the dog to the actual owner.
18	Carrot! A problem / Will the prince speak to his princess?	Wanderyu and Chimpui decide to teach Eri the benefits of carrots. A chef prepares various carrot dishes for Eri, but she dislikes them. Later, Eri goes to Uchiki's place and unknowingly, eats carrot cake and loves it / Wanderyu installs a satellite so that the prince can speak to Eri, but fails to watch Eri as Mrs Kasugi sits to watch her program. Wanderyu gets upset as his plan fails.
19	Eri and Chimpui's company / Difficulties in clicking pictures.	Mrs Kasugi denies Eri money to watch a movie, so Chimpui and Eri decide to start their own company to earn some money. They try all means to start their own company but fail in their plan / Wanderyu threatens Chimpui to get a picture of Eri. So, Chimpui takes Eri and Uchiki to the beach. While they enjoy themselves, Chimpui's friend succeeds in clicking Eri's pictures.
20	Eri becomes detective / Eri loves reading.	Eri uses a truth speaking machine to find out who robbed the boy's car. Eri searches like a detective and finds the lost car with the boy, who blames Uchiki for robbing it and proves Uchiki innocent / When Eri helps her mother in the household chores, Chimpui gives Eri a time machine. Eri sees Shosie backbiting about her to Uchiki and decides to get the issue sorted between Uchiki and her.
21	Education is life / Wanderyu's plan.	Wanderyu threatens Chimpui to hand over the gift to Eri given by the prince. Chimpui finds the right situation and time and gives Eri the gift / To get back Chimpui to planet earth, Eri decides to wear the royal shoes brought by Wanderyu. Just then, Chimpui reaches and discloses Wanderyu's plan. Later, they teach Wanderyu a lesson.
22	Everyone loves Eri / The love is annoying.	Eri gets scolding from her mother for wasting money on comic books. Wanderyu decides to help Eri by giving her some magical powers so that she is being loved by her near and dear ones / Eri gets a lot of love from everyone. As days pass by, the loving behaviour starts annoying her. So, she requests Chimpui and Wanderyu to make her normal like before.
23	Being troubled for a picture / A cat from another planet.	Oeyama and his friends call the reporters to get hold of the aliens, but Uchiki changes the UFO pictures with the help of Chimpui's magical powers / Wanderyu threatens Chimpui to convince Eri to come to their planet. A big cat comes and tells Eri that Chimpui works for him. She takes Wanderyu's help and sends the big cat away to help Chimpui.
24	Round! Double trouble / Fearless Chimpui.	Wanderyu installs a gadget on Eri's roof that makes Eri think and see everything round. She finds everything round around her and gets irritated. Chimpui destroys the device and helps Eri / Eri uses a device to kill Chimpu's fear of cats. She decides to strike Uchiki so that he falls in love with her, but Wanderyu gets hit with it. Later, she strikes another arrow and sends Wanderyu away.
25	Who showers maximum love? / A new friend in life.	Eri wishes to see Uchiki as a successful person, so she makes him study hard and practise baseball as well. She gets emotional and begins to cry when she sees Uchiki working hard to win her heart / Eri, Chimpui and Uchiki go on a hill to see the stars closely. On her way home, Eri sees a Panda fall off the tree. Eri takes him home and treats him as a friend without letting her parents know.
26	Meet with a celebrity / Clicking pictures for a competition.	An alien comes through a UFO to meet Eri and helps Uchiki and Chimpui and her to meet the celebrity singer. Shosei too gets shocked when she sees the singer sing and play the guitar in Eri's room / Eri gets upset and feels afraid of losing the picture clicking competition as she is not a great photographer. Wanderyu helps Eri to click good pictures with the help of a device.
27	Value your friends / Never forget true friendship.	Chimpui dreams about Zorashi (the big cat) trying to threaten him. So, he uses the magical rocket and sends Zorashi back. But later, as Eri scolds Chimpui, he realizes Zorashi's true friendship / Eri permits Hotaru to take Chimpui along with her. Eri realizes the value of true friendship after Wanderyu succeeds in his plan of making her realize.
28	Duplicate Wanderyu / Eri takes care of a child.	Tharusa uses her magical powers to separate Uchiki and Eri. She creates a duplicate Wanderyu, but Chimpui manages to help Eri. Later, the real Wanderyu reveals the fake one / Wanderyu and Chimpui bring a child for Eri to fulfil her wish of adopting a child. Eri takes care of the child as a mother. Later, Wanderyu takes the child back to the planet.
29	Visit to a Planet / Let's make the planet beautiful.	With the help of Chimpui's powers and device, Uchiki, Eri and Chimpui go to a different planet to find out about the life there. Wanderyu uses the device and send Eri's friends too, to the other planet / Chimpui uses his powers and brings life to the planet. While playing, Oeyama and his friend turn the lively land in to barren. But, they all get together and create a fertile planet again.
30	Lady love's magic / Visit to the past.	Wanderyu calls the love lady to use her magic over Uchiki but Wanderyu comes in the way and falls in love with the love lady / With the help of Chimpui's help, Eri, Uchiki and Chimpui go on a tour in the past through the time machine. They get trapped by the soldiers there, but a man helps them hide in his house. After returning, Eri and Uchiki fall in the same hole dug by Oeyama and his friend.
31	Eri's bodyguard / House of plants.	Wanderyu sends an alien bodyguard to protect Eri, but she refuses to take help. So, the alien gives his power to Uchiki, who protects her / Eri waters the plants and waits for them to grow. Wanderyu uses the magical light and his powers to grow the plants faster. Wanderyu forgets to switch off the magical light and the plants spread all over the house. At the end, the plants go back.
32	Eri's wish of going on a holiday / Uchiki's new friend.	Eri wishes to go on a holiday with her parents. So, Wanderyu gives her a wish diary. She writes her wish on it and soon, she gets good news from her father / Tharusa enters Eri's room and uses her things. She listens to the prince's audio and gets jealous, so she decides to befriend Uchiki. On knowing about this, Eri gets angry.
33	Eri's noble deed / Uchiki, the army leader.	Eri helps her father find his book from the scrap and gets the CD that she wished for, as a return gift for her noble deed / Wanderyu organises a fighting competition between Uchiki and Oeyama for the selection of an army leader. Uchiki and Oeyama fight and try to defeat one another. At the end, Uchiki wins the title.
34	How deep is Eri's love? / Princess Eri.	When Chimpui falls ill, Eri takes care of him and showers all her love. Wanderyu uses a device and measures Eri's love, as asked by the prince / Eri gets to know from the astrologer that she will be a Princess when she grows up. She gets upset on knowing that her parents won't join her in the future. Uchiki explains to Eri that astrologers are fraudulent. She then feels relieved.
35	The magical mic / An angel's visit.	Chimpui uses a karamatic mic to help Uchiki, Oeyama and Eri get what they want from others. At the end, Eri uses the mike and makes Wanderyu promise to never return to trouble her / A girl visits Eri's as her sister and spends time with her, and helps her in doing her home work. Later, Chimpui and Wanderyu realize that the girl has come from another planet. She leaves after finishing her task.
36	Driving a car / Eri's caring nature.	As Eri's father is a beginner in driving a car, Chimpui uses a device and makes the entire city small, including Shosei's car, so that he can practice to drive. But Eri's father drives rough and meets with accidents / An alien cat spies on Eri to collect evidence against her. On returning home, he meets with an accident. Eri takes the alien cat to her house and treats him with love.
37	Uchiki turns Prince / Eri's visit to planet Mahl.	Wanderyu gives Uchiki all the powers of a Prince. Eri feels very happy to be with Uchiki. He spends time with Eri and protects her in many instances / Eri decides to meet the Prince to see his face. So, she goes to the other planet with the help of Chimpui machine. She meets the Prince and notices that he doesn't have a face and returns home.
38	The controlling watch / Oeyama's realization.	Wanderyu instils a software in the wrist watch to controls Eri's actions. To take revenge, Eri and Chimpui make changes in the software and control Wanderyu / As Oeyama threatens the students to help him in the exams, Wanderyu uses his power to make Oeyama realize his mistake. In the results, Oeyama scores 100 out of 100 amongst all the children. He punishes himself.
39	Chimpui's Christmas gift / Christmas celebration with friends.	Zorashi decides to not return to earth as Chimpui burns her. But later, Eri realizes that Zorashi has brought Christmas gift for Chimpui / Eri goes to the other planet to celebrate Christmas. She has fun there but misses Uchiki. Later, they meet together in the house and have a celebration.
40	Solving the puzzle / Treasure hunt.	Oeyama and his friend hide Uchiki's book and gives him a hint to find it. After Eri, Uchiki and Chimpui find Uchiki's book, they find another puzzle in a bottle and get excited about treasure being there / Chimpui uses his tricks and finds a lot of gold in the river that belonged to a man. They leave the treasure with the man and return home.
41	Invisible magical cap / Multiple Eri's.	Chimpui gives Eri an invisible magical cap to avoid being caught by her mother. Eri hides the cap in her book. She gets shocked after finding out that her mother has sold the book and it has reached Oeyama / To help Eri do the household work, Chimpui creates replicas of Eri, does Eri's housework. Wanderyu hypnotises Eri to take her to his planet but Chimpui and Uchiki save Eri.
42	Will Wanderyu stay with Eri? / Visit to a beach.	Wanderyu decides to serve Eri and send Chimpui back to planet Mahl. Chimpui brings a dress for Eri sent by the prince. Wanderyu gets jealous and allows Chimpui to stay back with Eri / As Eri wishes to visit the beach, Chimpui's friend fulfils it with the help of a device sent by the prince. Eri, Uchiki and Chimoui visit a place with the help of Chimpui's magic and spend a great time together.
43	School on the moon / Travelling the Universe.	Wanderyu sends Eri and her friends to the moon. They explore and learn new things. They find it difficult to return as it was Wanderyu's plan and stay stranded on the planet / Wanderyu arranges for an object to travel to the Moon to save Eri and her friends, but Wanderyu fails to, so Chimpui helps everyone return to the earth with the help of his magic.
44	Importance of food / Friendship day celebration.	Wanderyu challenges Eri to stay hungry for a day so that she realizes the importance of food, but she finds it difficult to stay hungry. Later, as her hunger increases, Eri realises its importance / Wanderyu gives Eri and Uchiki magical chocolates to separate them. Uchiki and Eri eat the chocolates and begin to fight, but later get back to normal and celebrate friendship day.
45	Finding love in anger / Chimpui's signature campaign.	Wanderyu brainwashes Eri to leave the house, but Uchiki makes Eri realise her mistake. Wanderyu comes with a changed look to take Eri, but Chimpui reveals Wanderyu's identity / To let Chimpui stay, Eri and her friends come up with a signature campaign. Wanderyu takes his signature to the prince and returns with good news of letting Chimpui stay back.
46	Agent from another planet / Things don't turn out the way we want it to.	An agent comes from another planet to trouble Eri and Uchiki. He tries various tricks over Eri and her friends but gets trapped in his own trick and goes away / Eri gets excited to go out with Mrs Kasugi but doesn't find her home. After Eri's mother returns, Wanderyu does all the housework in exchange for a gift from the prince. In the evening, Mrs Kasugi takes Eri out for a stroll.
47	The Guru's visit / Mr Kasugi goes back to childhood.	As Eri has a skating competition, Wanderyu creates a robot of Eri, so that the Guru can meet Eri. Later, the Guru reveals to Chimpui and Wanderyu that he already knew their plans / While Eri was out, Chimpui and Wanderyu play a game with Mr Kasugi and turn him a child. Later, Wanderyu uses his powers and changes the child back to the grown up Mr Kasugi.
48	People turned into animals / Saving trees.	Wanderyu's boss sprays gas all over the city and turns people into animals, so that Eri decides to come to Planet Mahl. However, Wanderyu uses a hammer and turn animals back to people / A tree visits Eri and complains to her about deforestation. Chimpui, Eri and Uchiki take the tree to a shady place so that it bears fruit. A hungry man eats the fruit and requests people to grow more plants.
49	Wanderyu brings a guest / Impossible to break Eri and Uchiki's friendship.	Wimpui comes with Wanderyu to meet Eri and challenges Chimpui's powers. Wimpui makes Hotaru, Eri and Sayaka tiny, but Wanderyu stops Wimpui and brings them back to normal / Wanderyu decides to break Eri and Uchiki's friendship. He ties a magical thread in Sayaka and Uchiki's finger to unite them, but Chimpui reveals Wanderyu's plans and helps Eri cut the thread with scissors.
50	A gift for daddy / Changing a prisoner's life.	Eri and Chimpui decide to gift Mr Kasugi a gift, but falls short of money. Later, she takes a painter's help and gifts her father a beautiful painting / Eri finds a prisoner, who has run away from planet Mahl. Eri feeds him food and saves him from the cops. Eri gives the prisoner some money to start a new business and sends him back home.
51	Space competition (レッツゴー銀河レース) / The prince meets Eri. (はじめまして、ルルロフです)	Eri and Uchiki go into space for a competition. Wanderyu and Chimpui also decide to join them. They face a lot of obstacles in the race but finish it with the help of the prince / Prince Lulealv comes to planet earth to take Eri. He takes the form of Uchiki and meets her. After prince Lulealv reveals his identity, Eri tells him that she will not leave Uchiki, so the prince decides to leave. However, the people of Mahl accepted the friendship of Eri with Uchiki and Prince continue to send gift and love her.
