= List of Hell Teacher: Jigoku Sensei Nube characters =

This is a list of characters from Hell Teacher: Jigoku Sensei Nube.

== Doumori Elementary School staff ==
Meisuke Nueno (鵺野 鳴介, Nueno Meisuke)

Voiced by: Ryōtarō Okiayu, Fujiko Takimoto (1996 series, young), Shun'ichi Toki (2025 series, young)
Portrayed by: Ryuhei Maruyama
Also commonly known as Nūbē (ぬ〜べ〜), is a 25-year-old man with two jobs. Firstly, he is a powerful exorcist who deals with the affairs between humans and yōkai in his adopted home of Doumori. Secondly, he is the teacher of class 5-3 at Doumori Elementary, both guiding and protecting them from the spiritual encounters they face. Both jobs are equally important to him: he chooses to protect the innocent and punish the wicked, both human and yōkai, focusing primarily on those still young and innocent enough to need a guardian, as his teacher had done before her death.
Nūbē is trained as an exorcist and has many means of facing his encounters with yōkai. The most powerful of these tools is the Demon Hand (鬼の手, Oni no Te), the result of a battle with a powerful oni at his former school where he teaches. When the Oni attacks one of his pupils, Nūbē is forced to seal its power within the stump where his left hand should be. This grotesque appendage is sealed within a black glove on his left hand. If unsealed, it allows him to use his own spiritual energies combined with the powers of the Oni to attack evil opponents and for other purposes, such as communicating with other yōkai or freeing spirits. While Nūbē typically can control the power, he can only use a fraction of its true powers and abilities, as the Oni is so powerful that Nūbē himself cannot fully control it and it can consume his body and will if he becomes overwhelmed. The Oni is actually being held by Nūbē's Sensei, who died being consumed by the Oni when trying to save Nūbē. Nūbē's teacher was also a powerful exorcist, and her ultimate sacrifice, which led to her death, is the reason Nūbē wanted to become both a teacher and an exorcist.
Other than the demon hand, Nūbē employs various other spiritual artifacts in his battles. The Sutra of the White-Robed Goddess (白衣観音経, Byaku E Kanon Kyou), a white paper-like sutra, is used by Nūbē to surround and seal certain yōkai phenomena, either to restrain them or to exorcise them without the need for the Demon Hand, as in the case of a blind ghost child. He also possesses a crystal ball that can render certain spirits and phenomena visible to the human eye, such as when he spotted something on one of his students, as well as a set of prayer beads that he can use for attacks or as part of his summoning. Additionally, he eventually creates his own kudagitsune, a product of another kudagitsune he borrows from the itako-girl Izuna, along with his demon hand. Nūbē has also mastered several spiritual techniques, including the "youshin jutsu" (a technique that allows him to create a separate spiritual body that can move independently when he is asleep or meditating) and the ability to separate his physical body and spirit in order to transcend into other realms, such as when he challenges the ghost of a swimmer.
Personality-wise, Nūbē can exhibit both a jovial, fun-loving demeanor and a serious, focused attitude, depending on the context. When it comes to matters of spiritual or educational importance, he is a dedicated individual committed to carrying out his responsibilities flawlessly. This seriousness enables him to effectively handle one yōkai crisis after another and also drives him to ensure that his students receive the education they need without any distractions or oversights, despite the challenges posed by some of his underachieving male students. Outside of his professional duties, however, Nūbē reveals a more carefree, almost happy-go-lucky side, characterized by numerous faults. He frequently pursues romantic interests, particularly women with voluptuous figures, and often spends his limited funds on activities like pachinko. He regularly experiences financial difficulties, eagerly awaiting payday while subsisting on the school cafeteria's offerings or whatever freebies he can acquire, and occasionally devises schemes to get rich quick, even if it means resorting to the demon hand. Throughout it all, he endeavors to avoid the scorn and trouble stirred up by his rivals. Despite his occasional discontent with the teaching profession, Nūbē acknowledges that it does have its rewards.

Ritsuko Takahashi (高橋 律子, Takahashi Ritsuko)

Voiced by: Michiko Neya (1996 series), Aya Endō (2025 series)
Portrayed by: Mirei Kiritani
Is a head teacher of class 5-2 at Doumori Elementary regarded as the "madonna" of the school—a term referring to a beautiful unmarried woman. She is deeply committed to her role as a teacher, displaying seriousness and dedication in her work. However, she also exhibits nervousness and overt fear when confronted with the unknown, particularly the spirits and yōkai that frequently manifest at the school. This aspect of her personality presents a dilemma for Nūbē: while he is attracted to her beauty and fantasizes about her, he enjoys teasing her incessantly about her sensitivity to the supernatural and her reactions to his artifacts, often facing her subsequent wrath.
Initially, Ritsuko appears to be the least likely person for Nūbē to form a romantic relationship with. Despite his attempts to win her affection, she rebuffs him due to her apprehension about his spiritual preoccupations. However, as the series progresses, she gradually gains the courage to confront the yōkai threats, leading her to recognize Nūbē's altruistic efforts in assisting those in need, including the students. As her feelings for the male teacher develop, she endeavors to establish a closer bond with him. This progression draws the ire of Yukime, a yuki-onna who considers herself to be Nūbē's true love. The ensuing love triangle between the two teachers and the spirit girl becomes a central theme in the latter part of the manga, as Nūbē is compelled to navigate his emotions and decide whom he truly wants to spend his life with.

Ishikawa (石川先生)

Voiced by: Yoshiyuki Kouno (1996 series), Takahiro Sumi (2025 series)
Is a teacher frequently seen among the 5th Grade staff, likely serving as the gym teacher for that grade. Often sporting a jumpsuit and characterized by his disheveled hair, beard, and glasses, he occasionally offers advice and shares spiritual knowledge based on his own experiences. However, he also possesses some unsavory habits, such as carrying cards for various adult shops in his jumpsuit, a fact inadvertently revealed when they spill out of a borrowed suit in front of Nūbē. Although it remains unclear whether he is officially a 5th Grade teacher, Ishikawa is commonly seen in the company of the other 5th Grade teachers. Additionally, he has a peculiar aversion to showers, sometimes going without one for more than a month, and harbors a fetish for wearing women's undergarments—an interest that proves problematic for Nūbē when Minki, the sister of the demon hand (Bakki), arrives from hell to reclaim them.

Yoshihiko Ōtsuki (大月良彦, Ōtsuki Yoshihiko) Voiced by: Yasunori Masutani (1996 series) Kento Shiraishi (2025 series)

Is the fiery leader of class 5-1 at Doumori Elementary, and another unique blend of exorcist and teacher. Unlike Nūbē, however, he attributes all phenomena to plasma rather than spiritual power. This fundamental difference in belief often pits the two teachers against each other in heated debates over the true nature of the various problems plaguing the school. Consequently, students in both classes find themselves divided based on their loyalty to their respective homeroom teacher's beliefs. Armed with his scientific knowledge and research, Ōtsuki utilizes an array of devices and inventions to investigate and combat these threats—a method reminiscent of the scientific research and technology employed in Ghostbusters. While Ōtsuki initially plays a prominent role in the story, he gradually recedes into the background as the manga progresses.
In the 2025 anime adaptation, his name is changed to Terakawa (寺川) who doesn't wear a glasses.

Principal (校長, Kōchō)

Voiced by: Ginzō Matsuo (1996 series), Yasuhiko Kawazu (2025 series)
Is an administrative head of the elementary school, the principal diligently strives to maintain order and efficiency despite the numerous bizarre spiritual occurrences happening under his jurisdiction. Whether or not he was aware of Nūbē's dual roles as an exorcist and a teacher when he joined the school, he quickly recognizes it as a valuable asset to his staff and the overall well-being of the institution.

Vice Principal (教頭, Kyōtō)

Voiced by: Masaharu Satō (1996 anime)
Portrayed by: Toshiya Toyama
Not much is known about this flat-topped, glasses-wearing administrator, aside from his role as an associate working alongside the principal to manage Doumori Elementary. He is often seen in the background with his boss and the other teachers and staff of the school.

Mami Kuroi (黒井 まみ, Kuroi Mami)

She is one of the newer teachers at Doumori Elementary, heads the first-grade class of 1–3. However, unlike Nūbē's exorcisms, her interests and studies lie in the occult and witchcraft. She pursued her studies in a German university and across Europe to enhance her knowledge and skills in such areas. Despite her youthful appearance, she is actually 28 years old, several years older than the more experienced Nūbē. Nūbē disapproves of her obsession with the dark arts and often reprimands her for practicing them. The fact that her 1st-grade classroom is located two floors below his 5th-grade class occasionally exposes him to the influence of her magic unknowingly, until he intervenes to stop her antics. Some of her various magical skills include casting curses, devil's summoning, performing transformations, creating voodoo dolls, and even flying on her own little broomstick, not to mention wearing a flat-top hat that transforms into a witch's hat whenever she performs her magic.
Upon her arrival at the school, Kuroi becomes infatuated with her male colleague and decides to use her magic to try and win him over, even going as far as sealing his demon hand inside a cute handmade glove. However, after repeatedly being scolded by Nūbē, and possibly observing the romantic pursuits of both Ritsuko and Yukime, she resorts to summoning her own demonic love slave in the form of the "Western Devil" Beberububu.

== Students ==
=== Class 5-3 ===
Hiroshi Tateno (立野広, Tateno Hiroshi)

Voiced by: Toshiko Fujita (1996 series), Ryoko Shiraishi (2025 series), Yūto Uemura (adult, 2025 series)
Portrayed by: Taishi Nakagawa
He is the main male student character in the series and one of Nūbē's most active supporters. A transfer student who arrives at Doumori Elementary at the beginning of the manga, he initially doubts his teacher's claims about exorcisms but eventually becomes convinced after being saved from one spiritual problem after another. Typical of many young shōnen leads in manga and anime, Hiroshi is the courageous, heroic male of the class who always stands up to fight against any obstacle, whether human or yōkai, regardless of whether it makes sense. His favorite pastime is playing soccer for the school. However, Hiroshi's downside is his own stupidity: he has some of the worst grades in Nūbē's class and once set a record for receiving a hundred consecutive 0s on his tests. This lack of academic prowess causes him to make outlandish comments on simple ideas and leads him into many of his yōkai-related problems. He even wet his pants once after being scared by a ghost in a restroom. His character's name pays tribute to the main male lead of The Gutsy Frog, a classic 1970s Weekly Shōnen Jump series that Shou and Okano used as an influence for "Nūbē".

Kyōko Inaba (稲葉郷子, Inaba Kyōko)

Voiced by: Rumi Kasahara (1996 series), Aya Suzaki (2025 series)
Portrayed by: Airi Matsui
She is possibly the student who trusts and likes the teacher the most. Her first encounter with him actually happened several years earlier when Nūbē, then a college student, saved Kyōko, then a little girl, from an inari spirit (though it is suggested they may have met earlier in a past life). She is regarded as one of the most caring characters, often looking after Nūbē and the rest of the class and displaying an emotional attachment to them whenever something happens to someone she cares about. Despite appearing cute and innocent at first, Kyōko can have a violent temper that can drive her friends and even her teacher a bit crazy, although it does tone down later on. Initially, she cannot stand Hiroshi when he joins the class, but she gradually develops hidden romantic feelings towards him as the series progresses. Conversely, she consistently has a love/hate rivalry with her closest friend, Miki Hosokawa, typically over physical matters such as her flat chest, big butt, and Sailor Moon-esque pigtails. Her name pays homage to the female lead of Dokonjyou Gaeru, where, not coincidentally, this Kyōko is also in love with a Hiroshi.

Miki Hosokawa (細川美樹, Hosokawa Miki)

Voiced by: Miina Tominaga (1996 series), Tomoyo Kurosawa (2025 series)
Portrayed by: Hinako Sano
She is possibly the biggest troublemaker in Nūbē's class, she is best known for her outspoken nature, extensive knowledge of the spiritual realm, and ample bosom. Initially, Miki was merely a tattletale, incessantly gossiping about various rumors, especially those involving Nūbē. However, after a near-fatal encounter with a tattletale yōkai that falsely accused her of spreading hurtful rumors and then attempted to harm her, she begins to moderate her chatter and focuses more on spiritual matters. Miki delves into consistent research on various spirits and yōkai, becoming a go-to source even for her teacher on subjects he may not be familiar with. While much of her knowledge is purely academic, she frequently seeks supernatural means to further her gossip mill or to make a quick buck.
One of her most significant spiritual developments is gaining the ability to transform into a rokurokubi, allowing her to spiritually elongate her head and neck to go undercover wherever she pleases. Extremely proud of her physical appearance, Miki takes great pride in her expanding bust (which grows from a B-cup to an F-cup over the course of the series) and showcases it whenever possible. Her name, as well as her hairstyle and physical attributes, pay homage to the tragic Miki Makimura, the main heroine in another of Nūbē's primary influences: Go Nagai's classic horror series Devilman.

Katsuya Kimura (木村克也, Kimura Katsuya)

Voiced by: Kazunari Tanaka (1996 series), Ryōta Iwasaki (2025 series)
Portrayed by: Ryo Yoshizawa
He is the "juvenile delinquent" of the class, often presents a tougher facade than his true nature towards Nūbē and his classmates. Initially depicted as a loner, Katsuya's demeanor stems from being misunderstood by his peers, his own insecurities, or engaging in delinquent behaviors such as smoking or stealing for charitable causes. However, as the series progresses, he gradually confronts his inner struggles and integrates himself into Nūbē and his friends' circle, eventually becoming one of the main members of the class. Katsuya is a huge pervert towards sexy females, an attribute that gets him into a huge idolation of Miki. Although she treats him like her dog, he also consistently finds himself with the worst grades in class, alongside both Hiroshi and Makoto. Despite being perceived as a coward and a troublemaker, he surprisingly demonstrates qualities of a loving, caring, and protective big brother towards his younger sister, Manami.

Makoto Kurita (栗田まこと, Kurita Makoto)

Voiced by: Megumi Urawa (1996 series), Shiho Kokido (2025 series), Shimba Tsuchiya (adult, 2025 series)
Portrayed by: Yuri Chinen
While he is the same age as all of his classmates, he is perhaps the youngest in heart and spirit of class 5–3. At the start of the series, this bowl-haired boy finds himself the most emotional of the students, running and screaming away from any scary phenomenon. But with Nūbē's guidance and the assistance of his friends, he slowly learns to face his fears and grow up in certain ways. One of Makoto's greatest strengths is his kind and friendly nature, allowing him to try and remain cheerful in the face of both human and yōkai threats. However, he remains the most childlike of Nūbē's students, both in stature (though he is small, he is constantly hoping for the day he will "grow up") and his love of kiddy pastimes like keeping pets or watching sentai series. (His most favorite being Chou Kiken Sentai Kakukaku Ranger which is a slight parody in name of the series Ninja Sentai Kaku Ranger, but translates as Extremely Dangerous Sentai Nuclear Ranger) While he also receives horrible grades like Hiroshi and Katsuya, he actually puts in effort to try to improve himself in any way possible. His name and the model for his character design are both inspired from the Kazuo Umezu manga series Makoto-chan.

Akira Yamaguchi (山口晶, Yamaguchi Akira)

Voiced by: Michiyo Yanagisawa (1996 series), Natsumi Fujiwara (2025 series)
Portrayed by: Kazuki Shimizu
One of the smartest students in Nūbē's class, undergoes a slight character change as the series progresses. At the start, Akira is merely a bright but slightly unlucky boy who tries his best but can never achieve what he is capable of. His run of bad luck stems from a near-death experience at the Sanzu River, where a yōkai consistently obstructs anyone attempting to complete their tasks. After Nūbē exorcises this spirit, Akira finds a bit more luck but remains a more generic character. However, later in the series, Akira's modest personality shifts towards that of being the "mad scientist" of the class, consistently using technology to bridge the gap between humans and yōkai and showing off in order to do so. Originally, Akira was part of the main set of students allied with Nūbē, alongside Hiroshi, Kyoko, Makoto, and Miki. However, due to his earlier "plain" personality, he fell out of favor compared to more dynamic characters like Katsuya. Nonetheless, he remains a semi-major character throughout the manga's entire run. Like Miki, Akira's name is based on the main male lead Akira Fudo in Go Nagai's Devilman.

Shuichi Shirato (白戸秀一, Shirato Shuichi)

Voiced by: Junichi Kanemaru (1996 series), Ayahi Takagaki (2025 series)
Portrayed by: Gaku Sano
The richest and most snobbish member of Nūbē's class, he is the son of the owners of one of the finest restaurants in Doumori. Because of his privileged background, this "classy" boy often mocks Nūbē's personal tastes, both in cuisine and in his lack of material possessions. Despite Nūbē's occasional frustration with his arrogant attitude, he consistently finds a way to help Shuichi whenever he finds himself caught in a yōkai situation. In a slight deviation from his teacher and classmates, Shuichi shows interest in more scientific aspects of the supernatural, such as aliens and cryptozoology, attempting to demonstrate that there are phenomena beyond yōkai. However, he consistently turns to Nūbē for assistance in these matters. Nonetheless, Shuichi is not inherently evil; he also genuinely loves animals, to the extent of being willing to risk his life to stop an angry yōkai that was once a puppy.

Masaru Kaneda (金田勝, Kaneda Masaru)

Voiced by: Ginzou Matsuo (1996 series), Shōji Inoyama (2025 series)
Portrayed by: Takeaki Shima
He is the self-proclaimed "class bully" of 5–3, constantly trying to intimidate weaker students, such as Makoto, and clashing with anyone who opposes him. However, his schemes are consistently thwarted by Hiroshi, who stands up to him, and the yōkai that haunt him when he disturbs them. His biggest annoyance is when his name is mispronounced as "Kintama Saru," which means "testicle monkey" in Japanese. While he typically acts alone, he occasionally has two lackeys in the class whom he bosses around.

Noriko Nakajima (中島法子, Nakajima Noriko)

Voiced by: Machiko Toyoshima (1996 series), Nao Tōyama (2025 series)
Portrayed by: Kaho Mizutani
She is the sweet, cute, and perhaps most "normal" girl in class 5-3 compared to some of her classmates. Unlike the others, Noriko never seeks trouble, but it often finds her nonetheless. Initially a "background character" early on (often seen with her best friend Shizuka), "Noro-chan" gradually becomes one of the more prominent members of the class and a consistent target for spiritual activity. Miki, in particular, has a grudge against her: with her cute face, shoulder-length pink hair, and the second-largest bust in the class, the buxom blonde always gets upset whenever Noriko steals the spotlight away from her (often exclaiming Noro-chan no kuse ni!!, or "That Noro-chan!") While she appears docile and quiet, Noriko occasionally reveals a wilder and more playful side (usually in response to certain yōkai phenomena). She is also known as a bookworm and a rather clever tactician; once she played a key role in resolving a creepy case involving the ghost of the school library and a series of kidnappings related to the ghost's favorite book, which incidentally was the same book Noriko was fond of.

Shizuka Kikuchi (菊地静, Kikuchi Shizuka)

Voiced by: Emi Uwagawa (1996 series), Yui Makino (2025 series)
Portrayed by: Sara Takatsuki
Another of the more prominent "background characters," she was initially introduced as a one-joke character. During a class on the Ichimatsu Doll, Nūbē uses a cute girl with long black hair (Shizuka) as part of a joke to dispel a possession. Apart from this early joke, Shizuka is typically found in the background, either participating in activities with the rest of the class or spending time with her best friend, Noriko. However, while she appears innocent in the background, a later chapter reveals that this allows her to easily inform on her classmates to Nūbē, driven by a strong sense of justice that she prioritizes over her friendships (which nearly gets her into trouble with a dangerous team of yōkai).

Ayumi Kinoshita (木下あゆみ, Kinoshita Ayumi)

She is a quiet and studious member of class 5–3, possesses a unique spiritual ability that has enabled her to overcome her physical limitations. Originally bedridden due to illness, Ayumi was taught the "youshin jutsu" by Nūbē while she was still in college. This ability allows her to separate her spiritual body from her physical one, granting her the appearance of mobility and allowing her to attend school like any other student. Despite her condition, Ayumi joined Nūbē's class when she reached 5th grade. However, her youshin abilities are not fully developed, as they dissolve when she comes into contact with water. Ayumi's favorite pastime is reading, and she often immerses herself in books during class or leisure time, paying little attention to the activities of her classmates. Although she typically uses her youshin abilities to lead a normal school life, Ayumi can also utilize them to alter her physical form or clothing for various purposes. Additionally, she may harbor a small crush on Kaneda, possibly influenced by her newfound interest in literature, and he may be one of the few individuals, aside from Nūbē, who knows about her true nature.

=== Students in other classes ===
Mamoru Kazama (風間守, Kazama Mamoru)

Voiced by: Mari Maruta (1996 series), Mana Hirata (2025 series)
Another football prodigy from Doumori Elementary, alongside his best friend Hiroshi Tateno, he is a student in Ritsuko Takahashi's class 5–2.

Ai Shinozaki (篠崎愛, Shinozaki Ai)

Voiced by: Hitomi Oikawa (1996 series)
Portrayed by: Yurika Nakamura
Considered one of the most talented students at Doumori Elementary, she is a sixth-grader in class 6–5, one year ahead of Nūbē's class. A member of the Shinozaki zaibatsu, she is a beautiful girl who looks older than she really is (she is tall and slender, with a big bust that rivals Miki's and Ritsuko-sensei's), and she has mastery of several musical instruments including the violin and piano. In the anime, her episode occurs right after she wins a violin contest, showcasing her musical talent. Additionally, she is fluent in three foreign languages other than Japanese. However, beneath this perfect exterior, this spectacle-wearing female has many problems of her own.
Ai grows tired of consistently practicing under the pressure of her family to succeed, detests being treated as a goddess by others who only befriend her to boost their own status, and also struggles with occasional shoplifting to fulfill her desires without paying for them. According to her, she developed this habit to reassure herself that she was a normal person with flaws. It is these problems that attract occasional yōkai, who illuminate her personal struggles and lead her to Nūbē and the right path.
In one instance, Ai was possessed by a demon that manifested itself as tell-tale eyes appearing on her hand and later on her whole body. This possession persisted until she openly confessed to Nūbē and Makoto, her only friend at the time, that she was a shoplifter and revealed the reason behind her actions.
Despite Ai's seemingly solitary life, she has befriended Makoto and may harbor romantic feelings for him, although he remains oblivious to any such sentiments and would rather use her musical talents to sing the theme songs of his favorite sentai shows. Ai's name is connected to a series of horror films involving another set of children named "Ai and Makoto," which may explain her connection to him.

Manami Kimura (木村 愛美, Kimura Manami)

Voiced by: Tomiko Suzuki (1996 series), Miyuri Shimabukuro (2025 series)
She is Katsuya Kimura's younger sister and attends the same Domori Elementary School as her brother (2nd grade). Katsuya takes care of her on behalf of her parents who both work.

Izuna Hazuki (葉月いずな, Hazuki Izuna)

Voiced by: Chieko Honda (1996 series)
Portrayed by: Mizuki Yamamoto
Is a student at Doumori Middle School. She is a hot-blooded and reckless apprentice-level Itako, often overestimating her abilities and getting herself into trouble. She tends to use her powers in exchange for money, a habit that frequently earns her scolding from Nūbē. Additionally, she is an expert kudagitsune tamer.

== Yōkai ==
=== Oni ===
The Oni within Nūbē are extremely powerful demon creatures that originate from the depths of hell to wreak havoc and destruction upon our world. Unlike many depictions of oni in popular Japanese culture, these oni are a hybrid combination of the classic horned loincloth-wearing beings and Western devilish beasts, possessing claws, horns, immense strength, and demonic powers. All of the oni, particularly the Oni no Te and its connections, originate from an eight-tiered hell, where various devils and demonic beings become more powerful the deeper one goes. The demon trio originates from the 6th tier of this hell, known as Shonetsu (焦熱, which translates to "scorching heat", but in the combination 焦熱地獄, shonetsu jigoku, can signify Inferno or Burning Hell). Each oni has ascended through the upper levels of hell until finding a passage into the human world, near a spinning sphere in the playground of Doumori Elementary.

Bakki (覇鬼, Baki)

Voiced by: Hisao Egawa (1996 series), Hiroki Yasumoto (2025 series)
Portrayed by: Shinobu Sakagami
The first and perhaps most powerful of the oni encountered is the being residing within Nūbē's left hand since the beginning of the series. Sealed under a black glove, this entity is unleashed whenever the teacher requires it, granting him access to a greater extent of his spiritual power through this demonic limb. Initially appearing under Nūbē's control, the Oni gradually starts asserting its own autonomy and unleashing its tremendous full power. Despite Nūbē's skills as an exorcist, he cannot control the oni on his own, risking being controlled and devoured by it. The key to this control lies within the oni itself, housing the spirit of his former teacher, Minako-sensei, who sacrificed herself tragically to save her former student. She utilizes her spiritual power to restrain the Oni, enabling Nūbē to harness its power without being consumed. As she is crucial for keeping the beast at bay, Nūbē constantly seeks a dual solution: to finally control the Oni and free his former teacher from her imprisonment within the creature that has become his left hand. Later in the series, it is revealed that he is the eldest (and least intelligent) brother of a trio of oni siblings, still exceptionally powerful when left to his own devices.
By the end of the series, he undergoes a transformation, embracing goodness after experiencing numerous positive deeds.

Zekki (絶鬼)

Voiced by: Hikaru Midorikawa (3rd OVA)
Portrayed by: Ryosuke Yamada
The middle brother of the Oni trio, Zekki is one of the most cruelest and heartless beings that Nūbē and his allies encounter. Despite his appearance as a young teenage male, he is an incredibly powerful and dangerous entity who takes pleasure in killing anyone who crosses his path, regardless of age or gender. His notable characteristic is his use of musical terms, including a baton, to describe the carnage and destruction he inflicts.
Zekki arrives in the human world after three years of climbing in search of the man who now possesses his brother, Baki: the exorcist-teacher Nūbē. After effortlessly defeating Izuna Hazuki, the Itako girl, he easily overpowers Nūbē, Yukime, and Tamamo in his quest to uncover the hidden 'power' that supposedly sealed Baki in Nūbē's hand. Upon realizing that Nūbē did not seal his brother alone, instead relying on Minako's control from within the oni, Zekki decides to no longer hold back. The battles between the trio and Zekki intensify, with Nūbē at a disadvantage despite the assistance of a true demon-sealing bracelet. Following sacrifices made by Nūbē's students, Yukime and Tamamo, Nūbē voluntarily unseals the oni within his hand, seemingly consumed by Baki. However, he retains his human heart and, after defeating Zekki, is revived by the mermaid Hayame.

Minki (眠鬼)

She is the youngest but equally destructive—and annoying—sister of the oni family. Though she possesses power and abilities similar to her older brothers Baki and Zekki, the source of her (and possibly all the oni's) power lies in a pair of panties she wears. (According to legend, most of an oni's spiritual power comes from their underwear or loincloth) When she accidentally loses her panties in the human world, she is forced to cross over to get them back, even if it means making Class 5-3 nude in the process. Although she manages to retrieve them (they were being worn by the perverted Ishikawa-sensei), Nūbē confiscates them and, in a peculiar move, enrolls the Oni-girl in his class. He believes that beyond her panty-powers, Minki is a quiet, nice girl who needs to learn a few things. Initially seeming strange, Minki eventually reveals a protective, kinder side, even defending her classmates like Nūbē does. However, upon retrieving her panties, Minki regains her full, demonic power and attitude, confronting her teacher and displaying particular animosity towards the male students. At the climax of her rampage, just as she prepares to destroy her teacher and the school, her panties fall off once again, causing her to abandon her attack and nearly destroying herself in the process. Despite this, Nūbē saves her, believing her to be different from the other Oni, and offers her a second chance in the human world.
After nearly destroying the school and Nūbē, Minki becomes a valuable student and a key ally in his battle to protect his students and fight against intruding enemies and yōkai. Although she doesn't possess all of her Oni power as she did with her panties, she still has enough to occasionally play naughty tricks on her friends and classmates. While she slowly seems to accept them as friends, she struggles due to her own circumstances. Additionally, she assists her teacher in a valuable way: when he faces enemies that force the Oni no Te away from him, Minki can fuse with Nūbē, allowing him to utilize her Oni power. A significant difference between her and Baki's arrangement is that the teacher can use a fuller extent of Minki's power because theirs is a conscious partnership. Beyond battles, Minki views Nūbē not only as her teacher but also as her "big brother," as her 'real' big brother is sealed in his hand. This leads to some rather awkward situations regarding the meaning of being a human sibling versus being an Oni sibling.
As a final note, Minki is the only member of the Oni siblings who does not have a full demonic form. Although she can exhibit an Oni appearance, such as her scantily clad appearance and demonic hands and feet, this form appears more human than either Zekki or Baki. This difference could possibly show an influence from the American comic series Witchblade. Just as peculiarly, two horn-like protrusions that allow for the formation of her long pigtails remain visible in both her "human" and "Oni" forms.

=== Kitsune ===
Long known as prominent yōkai, the kitsune are a group of animal spirits typically associated with foxes. While any fox can be considered a kitsune, there are special foxes known as yōko, some of the most spiritually powerful beings in existence. Yōko possess various abilities, including the creation and manipulation of illusions and fire, as well as the use of a special "transformation jutsu" to blend in with humans, often causing chaos and mischief. Additionally, kitsune and yōko are linked with inari, playing an integral role in local harvest festivals in Japan.

Tamamo (玉藻)

Voiced by: Toshiyuki Morikawa
Portrayed by: Mokomichi Hayami
Also known as Kyōsuke Tamamo (Tamamo Kyōsuke 玉藻京介) in his human form, is a central figure among the yōko in the manga series. He is a powerful being who serves as both Nūbē's ally and ultimate rival. Initially appearing at Doumori Elementary as a charismatic and attractive male teacher, he quickly gains the admiration of his students and colleagues. However, his true motive is to obtain the skull of Nūbē's student, Hiroshi Tateno, which he considers to be the perfect vessel for his transformation into a human. When Nūbē intervenes to protect Hiroshi, a fierce battle ensues, revealing Tamamo's true form as a golden fox-creature. Despite nearly defeating Nūbē, Tamamo is ultimately thwarted by Hiroshi's bravery.
Despite this setback, Tamamo remains intrigued by Nūbē's powers, particularly how they are amplified when he fights for his students. Recognizing the power of the human heart, Tamamo seeks to understand it better by observing Nūbē and creating situations that force him to fight. In a significant departure from his initial guise, Tamamo later assumes the role of a doctor at Doumori Hospital, utilizing his 400 years of accumulated knowledge to heal others. He sees this as an opportunity to gain insights into humanity and further his understanding of the human heart.
Having honed his spiritual powers over centuries, Tamamo has mastered various abilities even without perfecting his "transformation jutsu". He excels in "illusion jutsu", capable of manipulating perceptions to project convincing illusions, even generating clones from video game screens. In combat, he employs "yōko foxfire jutsu", conjuring and controlling potent fire-based attacks with escalating power. Additionally, he possesses skills akin to Nūbē's, aiding in spiritual energy manipulation and the "youshin jutsu".
His primary physical weapon is a paw-like neck catcher, primarily used to extract suitable skulls for his "transformation jutsu". However, it can also be disassembled to create a barrier, encasing himself and adversaries for more formidable attacks. In the manga, it is revealed that the skull he currently utilizes was obtained from a deceased mountain climber, a prosperous college student. His encounter with the climber's fiancée serves as a pivotal moment in Tamamo's character development.
At the outset of the series, Tamamo appears as a formidable yōkai driven by selfish motives, manipulating and engaging in combat. However, as he fights alongside Nūbē and class 5-3, resolving numerous yōkai-related issues, he gradually develops a deepening fondness for humanity. This sentiment culminates when he utilizes "Megido," his most potent fire-based ability, to thwart Zekki, Nūbē's Oni no Te's younger brother.
Tamamo's growing attachment to humans becomes evident when he refrains from seizing Hiroshi's skull, despite the opportunity arising later on. His exposure to the complexities of the human heart renders him incapable of such a ruthless act. However, this poses a dilemma for him, as without a suitable skull, his mental and physical faculties would deteriorate over time, leaving him as but a mere shell of his former self.
In the manga liner notes for Volume 2, the author stated that Tamamo was meant to be a direct descendant of the Nine-Tailed Kitsune notorious as Tamamo no Mae. However, the fox, appearing later in the story, was less than fond of Tamamo, thus suggesting that the name was likely an allusion, perhaps out of respect.

==== The Golden Nine-Tail Kitsune ====
Considered one of the most powerful yōkai in existence, The Golden Nine-Tail Kitsune (Konmougyokumen Kyūbi no Kitsune 金毛玉面九尾の狐) is one of the few beings capable of overpowering even the Oni. In ancient times, this kitsune journeyed across India and China to Japan, where it last appeared 800 years ago as Tamamo no Mae, the wife who enchanted Emperor Toba. Nestled within a chamber beneath the Sesshou Stone in Nasuno, Tochigi Prefecture, it harbors immense hatred for humans and desires either their demise or avoidance of these "lower beings." Nūbē is compelled to undergo various trials from this powerful 3000-year-old yōkai when Tamamo gradually deteriorates due to his inability to master his "transformation jutsu" abilities. Apart from its profound skills in illusion, transformation, and fire manipulation, it can summon a special "Trial Jar" for its yōko followers to test their worthiness by escaping without resorting to their powers. Eventually, the fox also becomes intrigued by Tamamo's growing fondness for humanity and grants him enough power to sustain his current form.

Tsuwabukimaru (石蕗丸)

Voiced by: Makoto Koichi (2025 series)
He emerges when Tamamo falls seriously ill, reminding him of the imperative to master his "transformation jutsu" to avoid being reduced to ashes. He is a young kitsune who deeply admires Tamamo and is determined to prevent his demise. Lacking an understanding of Tamamo's evolving relationship with humans, Tsuwabukimaru initially seeks Hiroshi's skull and is only dissuaded at the last moment by Tamamo himself. He holds Nūbē responsible for Tamamo's decline into weakness and eventual deterioration, although he ultimately agrees to guide the teacher to the Nine-Tailed Kitsune. Tsuwabukimaru adopts the attire and demeanor of a ninja, wielding two sharp blades affixed to his arms and moving with remarkable agility. Despite his masculine name, there are implications that the skull he uses to assume human form may belong to a female, as Nūbē teases Tamamo upon his arrival. While he possesses a straightforward and determined personality, Tsuwabukimaru also exhibits a degree of naivety and airheadedness.

=== Mountain Yōkai ===
In the northern Tohoku region of Japan, a myriad of yōkai is intertwined with the local elemental essences of rock, wind, snow, and ice. Overseeing these yōkai is a potent mountain deity whose spiritual decree reigns supreme, compelling obedience under the threat of dire consequences. Possessing a detached demeanor akin to the chilling winds of their domain, these beings lead an emotionless existence, merely coexisting with humanity while whimsically determining their fates. However, the relationship between these mountain yōkai and humans would be challenged by a yuki-onna and the man she loves...

Yukime (ゆきめ/雪姫)

Voiced by: Yuri Shiratori (1996 series), Ai Kakuma (2025 series)
Portrayed by: Kang Ji-young
One of the yōkai hailing from the mountains of northern Japan, she is a 16-year-old yuki-onna whose life is complicated by her love for Nūbē. Their connection began five years earlier when Nūbē, lost while skiing, rescues her from a hunter intent on killing her to prevent her from posing a threat to his village as she matures.
Yukime pledges to find Nūbē eventually so they can be together "in eternal love." The significance of this promise becomes apparent when she descends to Doumori, determined to preserve him in ice "for eternity." Despite her affectionate nature, she is dissuaded from taking him to the mountains thanks to the efforts of Nūbē's students. Although she initially attempts to attack them, Nūbē urges her to depart. However, she returns to Doumori and takes up a role as an ice skating coach at the local rink, endeavoring to capture Nūbē's heart.
Yukime possesses several powers and weaknesses stemming from her connection to snow, ice, and the cold. Her primary ability lies in the creation of snow or ice from her body, which she can employ to freeze any target within her line of sight. This freezing power proves useful in offensive attacks, constructing roadblocks to halt larger targets, and even focusing light like a magnifying glass. Additionally, Yukime has a slight healing ability, and her affinity with the cold grants her a natural talent for figure skating. Despite these powers, Nūbē humorously remarks that the only practical use of Yukime's abilities is in making shaved ice.
Being a snow yōkai comes with its weaknesses: Yukime cannot tolerate intense heat. Additionally, she struggles to prepare hot foods and is unable to wear certain black clothing for fear of melting parts of her body. However, Yukime has an adorable solution to temperature-related issues: when she becomes overheated, she envelops her entire body in a snowman form to cool herself down, much to Nūbē's chagrin when she emerges from it... completely naked. While many of these heat-related challenges were eventually resolved later in the series, Yukime still occasionally faces difficulties in hotter temperatures.
While Yukime becomes both a valuable ally and a nuisance in Doumori, it is her relationship with Nūbē that drives most of her character development throughout the series. After her initial appearance, she develops a love/hate relationship with the teacher, with several of her attempts to win Nūbē's affections resulting in some acknowledgment but further frustration for both of them. Adding to the complexity is the presence of the beautiful and ultra-sensitive Ritsuko-sensei, whom Nūbē initially desires and who eventually begins to reciprocate some of his feelings, just as Yukime is starting to make progress with him.
Yukime is tricked into capturing the teacher, believing that sacrificing Ritsuko is necessary to make her human. However, she cannot bring herself to kill Ritsuko due to pity, which serves as a test to determine if she still possesses the heart of a cold yuki-onna. Nūbē eventually saves them both, apologizing to Yukime and confessing his love for Ritsuko. Unfortunately, it is too late, as a severely injured Yukime uses the last of her powers to help destroy the yōkai and turns into snowflakes in Nūbē's arms.
While Nūbē believes her to be dead, her snowflakes are carried away to her mountains, where the Mountain god uses them to create another yuki-onna in her place, with the same appearance and name. However, this new Yukime has a cold heart and does not hesitate to kill. Nūbē encounters her during a school trip, where she lures him away from his class to attack him. He allows her to do so, but not without invoking memories of the original Yukime. Confused, the "new" Yukime flees.
Yukime returned to Doumori later to seek closure for her conflicting feelings. Realizing she loved Nūbē, she decided to stay and reconcile the two halves of herself. Although she did not remember much of her life before, it was implied that Yukime eventually recovered all of her memories. Her personality also shifted from the aggressive yuki-onna youkai to a balanced blend of her childish former self and assertive new identity.
The last chapter of the manga depicts Nūbē and Yukime's wedding. Originally planned at a typical Japanese wedding venue, Nūbē's delay due to a yōkai intervention forces them to improvise. They opt to hold the ceremony on the primary school playground where Nūbē teaches, with Yukime crafting a chapel of ice. Instead of a Catholic priest, a recurring Buddhist priest character from the series officiates the ceremony.
In the anime, an alternate world is depicted within Kyouko's dreams and subconscious, shaped by a yōkai that had possessed her during sleep. In this alternate reality, Yukime had evolved into a full-fledged yuki-onna and remained at Doumori. However, she was no longer with Nūbē, who had fallen into a catatonic state after narrowly escaping murder by another yōkai. (Note: Although this chapter existed in the manga, Yukime was absent from the original version as she had not yet returned to Doumori at that point.)

Mountain God (山の神, Yama no Kami)

Voiced by: Hisao Egawa (1996 series)
The kami presides over an unnamed mountain in an undisclosed province, serving as Yukime's creator. He embodies nature's essence, transcending human comprehension. His paramount concern is maintaining the equilibrium of nature, leading him to disapprove of Yukime's desire to reside in the human world with Nūbē. From his perspective, Yukime's purpose is to bring snow and harmony to the mountain's winters, and her departure disrupts this delicate balance. The Mountain God dispatched servants to retrieve her, but their defeat by Nūbē only fueled his displeasure, manifested grotesquely by afflicting nearby villagers with tree branches sprouting from their skin. Despite Yukime and Nūbē's efforts to appease him, their attempts failed, and they faced the prospect of death from the Mountain God's wrath. However, Nūbē's father intervened, sacrificing himself as a human pillar to contain the kami's fury, enabling his son to pursue a life of happiness.
The Mountain God's form resembles a colossal human visage and hands carved into a towering rock cliff. Trees flourish above him, while pools of magma bubble beneath his feet.

==== Servants of the Mountain God ====
After Yukime defies the Mountain God's directive regarding Nūbē, the deity dispatches several other mountain yōkai to thwart her and her beloved, employing various tactics to separate them:

Ippon Datara (一本ダタラ)

This yōkai takes the guise of a disfigured, one-legged monk. He approaches Yukime, asserting that the only means for her to win the affection of a human is by transforming into one herself, achieved through freezing the body of a beautiful woman (who, in this instance, turns out to be Ritsuko-sensei). Utilizing the power of his lone eye, he abducts the female teacher, leaving her partially frozen for Yukime to complete the task. However, his true motive is to prompt Yukime to commit murder, thereby restoring her lost cold-heartedness and reverting her to a true yuki-onna, eligible to reunite with the Mountain God. Yukime releases Ritsuko-sensei, but Datara retaliates by freezing her and impaling her with icicles as punishment for her defiance. Despite Nūbē and Yukime's eventual triumph over him, she is left severely weakened by the encounter, her life force dwindling. Nonetheless, as she fades away, she finally receives Nūbē's acknowledgment of his love.

Kodama Mice (こだまねずみ, Kodama Nezumi)

Originally hailing from Akita Prefecture, these diminutive spies infiltrate Yukime's satchel upon her return to Doumori following her resurrection. Observing Yukime until the opportune moment, they possess the ability to inflate themselves like balloons until they eventually burst, resulting in the demise of anyone who has transgressed the laws of the Mountain God. Although they nearly decimate Yukime, Nūbē, and his class, Nūbē manages to rescue everyone through the timely recitation of a sutra just before the explosion.

Tsurara (つらら)

Despite her outward appearance as a mature, well-endowed woman with black hair, Tsurara is actually Yukime's identical twin sister. During their youth, the two sisters spent ample time together, with Tsurara frequently playing practical jokes on her white-haired yuki-onna sibling, often resulting in her reform or dispersal into snowflakes. When she confronts her sister and Nūbē, it is in the capacity of a messenger from the Mountain God, dispatched to either peacefully retrieve Yukime or eliminate her, under the belief that her presence among humans will only bring misfortune to Nūbē. Tsurara possesses the ability to manipulate ice, specializing in the creation of ice replicas of any object she encounters, which function as lifelike models (including machinery and animals). Ultimately, Yukime prevails over her by fashioning a colossal ice magnifying glass, sapping Tsurara's ice-manipulating abilities to the point of rendering them ineffectual. Unlike the other messengers, however, Tsurara manages to evade capture.

Iwatengu (岩天狗)

An exceedingly potent yōkai composed entirely of stone, he stands as the ultimate and most formidable of the Mountain God's servants, relentlessly pursuing Nūbē long after his master's demise. Following Nūbē and Yukime's engagement, he stalks the prospective groom on the eve and day of his wedding, employing illusions through his "Anxiety Wind" to instill in the teacher the dread of marrying a yuki-onna. By subjecting Nūbē to a sleepless night, he nearly drives him to his demise, until the intervention of Baki (the Oni no Te, who by this time has forged a more cooperative alliance with the teacher) saves his life. Despite augmenting his wind-based powers by elongating his nose and unleashing his ultimate gust abilities, the tengu ultimately meets his downfall when Baki reaches full power, as Nūbē comes to the realization that he can indeed find happiness with Yukime.

Yukibe (ゆきべ~)

Voiced by: Chika Sakamoto (1996 series)
Yukibe was a child who bore a striking resemblance to both Yukime and Nūbē, leading everyone to presume that he was the product of their union. However, his true origin was solely attributed to Yukime's powers. It was revealed that as a yuki-onna reaches maturity, she gains the ability to create a snow-child (Yuki-Warashi) to play with before it eventually departs into the mountains, thus bringing winter to the world. Possessing the same freezing abilities as Yukime, Yukibe caused considerable havoc before finally departing, leaving behind snow in Doumori. Although this is Yukibe's only appearance, Nūbē is frequently reminded of him whenever he envisions the notion of having a real child with Yukime, which only serves to deepen his unease about the relationship between a human and a yuki-onna.

=== Other Yōkai ===
While numerous yōkai make appearances in Nūbē, either as threats or aids to the class and the citizens of Doumori, some have multiple appearances and maintain a consistent connection with the series' characters.

Zashiki-Warashi (座敷わらし)

Voiced by: Ayana Taketatsu (2025 series)
She is a small, childlike yōkai known for bringing good luck to anyone in its vicinity. Merely being near it grants a bit of luck, but befriending it can result in extended periods of good fortune. Usually, it cannot be seen by ordinary people.
Nūbē first encounters this yōkai after experiencing a particularly lucky streak at a pachinko parlor (though it's unclear if the yōkai caused his good fortune; it's suggested he may have been using his powers to win). After feeding it some senbei, it follows him back to school, where it brings good fortune to the students in his class one after another even Hiroshi manages to score an 80 on his test, which is remarkable given his lack of academic prowess). Nūbē tries to convince the yōkai that they don't need its help, scaring it away, but it returns to save Hiroshi from a potentially fatal accident. In another incident, Zashiki Warashi demonstrates the power to reverse fortunes, causing the yuki-onna Yukime to experience a series of disasters, the most notable of which is witnessing a date between Nūbē and Ritsuko-sensei.
Zashiki Warashi's last major appearance revealed that there was more to the yōkai than originally suggested. She was revealed to be the spirit of a poor young girl named Haroku (春子) who had lived fifty years ago. Despite having little herself, the girl cared deeply for others and often helped them. She eventually fell ill with pneumonia and, even on her deathbed, wished for the health and happiness of those around her rather than for herself. In gratitude for all she had done, Nūbē and his class held a party to thank Zashiki Warashi and even arranged for her to see her mother one more time. However, Zashiki Warashi's work is never done.

Kuchisake-onna (口裂け女)

Is a legendary yōkai with mysterious origins, even within the world of Nūbē. According to some legends, she is the result of a gruesome dental surgery performed 80 years ago, leaving her with a gaping mouth and jagged teeth. She roams various towns wearing bandages to conceal her mouth, asking children if she is pretty before revealing her terrifying visage and frightening them away. However, in reality, the Kuchisake-onna is the product of animal possession, stemming from an encounter with the vengeful spirit of an inugami, which bestowed upon her its demonic mouth. When the students of Nūbē's class encounter a Kuchisake-onna after hearing the legend, they attempt to defend themselves using pomade to repel her. However, the teacher intervenes, using the Oni no Te to dispel the spirit and unveil the beautiful woman hidden beneath the monstrous facade. This particular Kuchisake-onna, later identified as Honomi, is revealed to be the youngest of three Kuchisake sisters, who reside together and occasionally find themselves in trouble due to their notoriety and association with the legends surrounding their mouths.

Hayame (速魚)

Voiced by: Wakana Yamazaki (PS1 game)
She is a sweet but extremely ditzy mermaid who occasionally assists Nūbē, although he usually ends up regretting it. She typically appears in one of two forms: either as a typical mermaid, nude with her long green hair covering her bosom and an orange fin on the bottom, or in a human form achieved by magically transforming her fin into two human legs. However, the transformation often results in her inadvertently revealing her privates, much to the embarrassment of any nearby males. Like the mermaids of Japanese legend, she has the ability to grant immortality to anyone who eats her flesh, as well as the ability to reverse this immortality by consuming her liver. Additionally, her blood possesses potent healing properties: a single drop can instantly heal any wound, even fatal ones. However, there is a drawback to Hayame's healing abilities: the recipient of her blood becomes temporarily unintelligent after being healed. Furthermore, Hayame can control and manipulate people's emotions through singing, akin to the mythical sirens.
Hayame became connected to Nūbē through strange circumstances: introduced as the mummified corpse of a mermaid possessed by the priest Oshō, the teacher ends up imbuing it with some of the spiritual power of his Oni no Te when the foolish priest forces him to attempt its revival. Although the project initially appeared to fail after Nūbē spent thirty minutes channeling spiritual energy into it, the corpse miraculously revived overnight. Grateful to the teacher, the awakened female mermaid chose to express her gratitude by offering him the gift of immortality. Initially mistaking the living Hayame for a crazed, overworked student on the brink of a breakdown due to cram school stress, Nūbē eventually realized the truth. He apologized upon discovering that Hayame had been mummified after being stranded away from the sea for two hundred years following her attendance at a festival. Although he declined her offer of immortality, Nūbē ultimately found himself saved by her intervention after nearly sacrificing his life to rescue a child.
Although Hayame eventually returns to the sea after this incident, she consistently finds ways to drop into Dōmori, leading to Nūbē getting stuck with her time and again. Many of her actions make her appear more like a juvenile teenager than the long-lived yōkai she is. She gets caught by scientists when all she wants to do is buy a CD player, and she even considers using her singing abilities to audition for a local talent show. Despite her faults, Hayame continues to exhibit a caring, helpful personality, always ready to assist those in need, even if her efforts sometimes end up causing more trouble than help.

Kudagitsune (くだ狐)

Are small, elongated animal yōkai native to the Tohoku region, often dwelling in tubes, and commonly associated with itako spiritualists like local spiritualist Izuna Hazuki. Invisible to average humans, they perform various tasks for their controllers, including gathering information, facilitating communication, and even entering human bodies to retrieve thoughts. While typically loyal to their birth or raising masters, they can be influenced by beings of greater power, such as Tamamo, who can control them due to their simpler nature compared to his.
In Nūbē's world, most kudagitsune belong to Izuna, serving as both helpers and servants. Housed in her apartment in various shapes and sizes, they assist her with chores and upkeep until needed for other tasks. Izuna stores her duty-bound kudagitsune in small lipstick vials, releasing them as required. Nūbē himself also employs a kudagitsune named Baco, created when the energies of a kudagitsune combined with those of the Oni no Te, resulting in a demonic-looking yōkai that aids the teacher when not residing in a pen. Villainous Priest Kanran is another user, keeping several kudagitsune, including his most powerful one, in his left eye socket.
The most legendary kudagitsune in the series is Gedo, a massive yet somewhat dim-witted being with immense power potential. Born once every 300 years within a Tohoku mountain, Gedo holds the ability to unlock the "True Treasure" of one's greatest desire. Unexpectedly coming into Izuna's possession, she must protect Gedo from the nefarious Kanran, who seeks the treasure Gedo may unveil.

Kesaran Pasaran (ケサランパサラン)

Although it initially appears as a small white fuzzball, it is an immensely useful and lucky yōkai for anyone who encounters it. Its origin is unknown, though one legend suggests it may be a gift from angels. Kesaran Pasaran is renowned for bringing good luck and happiness to those who encounter it. Intriguingly, the number of fuzzballs can multiply rapidly if kept near face powder for a period: the more Kesaran Pasaran, the greater the good luck.
The yōkai is first encountered by Miki during a Christmas party. She initially uses its luck abilities and multiplication trick to fulfill her desires but ultimately ends up saving her friends and bringing joy to the entire town in the process. Later, Kesaran Pasaran is revealed to be the "yōkai of ultimate good," rescuing both Dōmori and, ultimately, the world from the unleashed power of the ultimate evil yōkai: Yamato no Orochi.
