= Jun'ichi Kanemaru =

Japanese voice actor

- 金丸 淳一
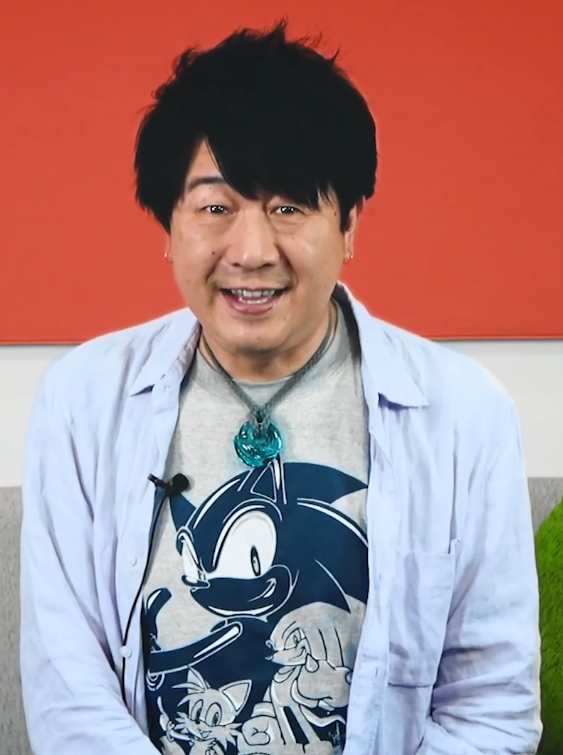
- Kanemaru in 2021
- Born: October 27, 1963 (age 62); Kōfu, Yamanashi Prefecture, Japan
- Other names: Junkun (淳くん); Junbow; Junnii (じゅんにい); Jun (ジュン)
- Occupations: Voice actor, singer-songwriter
- Years active: 1985–present
- Agent: 81 Produce
- Notable credits: Sonic the Hedgehog as Sonic the Hedgehog; Future GPX Cyber Formula as Hayato Kazami; Digimon Tamers as Ryo Akiyama
- Height: 184 cm (6 ft 0 in)
- Website: JK-EXPRESS

Jun'ichi Kanemaru (金丸 淳一, Kanemaru Jun'ichi; Kōfu, born October 27, 1963) is a Japanese voice actor and singer. He joined 81 Produce in 2003. He voiced Hayato Kazami in Future GPX Cyber Formula, Ryo Akiyama in Digimon Tamers and has been the Japanese voice of Sonic the Hedgehog in the eponymous series since 1998. He came in eighth in the Seiyū Grand Prix in 1994.

== Early life ==
While studying child psychology, Kanemaru worked part-time at the Far East Network in Yokota Air Base, and at a department store as a studio DJ in Shinjuku.

== Career ==
Kanemaru landed his first role in Urusei Yatsura. He later took part in several of Fuji TV's Saturday evening shows such as High School! Kimengumi, Tsuide ni Tonchinkan, and Meimon! Dai San Yakyūbu. At the time, he was employed by Beniya 25-Ji and Dojinsha Production. He got his first lead role in 1991's Future GPX Cyber Formula, where he played Hayato Kazami. He found out about it the day before the recording, when he heard an answering machine on his trip, and rushed home to read the script on the day of the recording. When he appeared in Cyber Formula, he was also working as an English tutor, and one of his students' parents leaked information about him, causing a huge commotion in the adjacent shopping district as anime fans rushed to the place where he was teaching.

During the dubbing of an American television sitcom Growing Pains, a Sega official who came to look for the role of Sonic heard Kanemaru's performance in the waiting room and cast him for the role starting from Sonic Adventure. This established a role for Sonic, who could freely switch between English and Japanese, and also led to Kanemaru's role. His performance in the Sonic series also led to offers from Disney to record children's programs. For the live-action film adaptation for the Sonic series, Kanemaru was replaced by Taishi Nakagawa. At the time the film was released, Kanemaru took to Twitter to express his thoughts and support the crew for the film.

In an interview with Animate Times in 2016, Kanemaru recalled that Cyber Formula helped him get used to singing, as the series had monthly album releases at the time. He was the first in the voice acting industry to be allowed to cover "Ue o Muite Arukō" and recorded it with an a cappella chorus. On his 1993 album Inspired Colors, he also wrote and composed the song "12-Gatsu no Fairy Tale", as well as English covers of "Video Killed the Radio Star" and Kazumasa Oda's "Love Story wa Totsuzen ni" under the title "Suddenly" (using the lyrics from Rita Coolidge's version). He has also tried his hand at standard jazz and has performed several live shows with several fellow voice actors, and his jazz numbers mixed with English and Japanese lyrics written himself are well received by all ages.

== Filmography ==
=== Anime series ===
List of voice performances
Year	Title	Role	Notes	Source
1985	Urusei Yatsura	Super Delicious Kid, Pupil	Debut role	
1985–1986	Touch	Yūji Narita, Manabu Ōgawara, Eiichirō Kashiwaba (as second-year high school student)		
1985	Ninja Senshi Tobikage	Kanji		
1985	High School! Kimengumi	Torio Tanokin, Keio Waseda, Shigeo Nagatsura, Tōru Iitomo, Kenichi Otonari		
1986	Mobile Suit Gundam ZZ	Chimatta		
1986	Anmitsu Hime	Shirataki		
1987–1988	Mami the Psychic	Young man, head of newspaper department		
1987	Tsuide ni Tonchinkan	Chinpei Hatsuyama (Green)		
1988	Tsurupika Hagemaru	Masaru Kondo		
1988	ja:名門!第三野球部	Koji Ishii		
1989	Shin Bikkuriman	Shapan		
1989	Blue Sonnet	Male pupil	OVA	
1989–1990	Yawara!	Kawano, student B		
1989	Chimpui	Masao Koyama (Konsaburō Kozune)		
1990–1992	Chibi Maruko-chan	English teacher, little boy		
1991	Getter Robo Go	Yuji Mutoh		
1991–2000	Future GPX Cyber Formula series	Hayato Kazami	TV, OVA	
1991	21 Emon	Man B, pupil A, delivery robot, Pollin		
1991	Otaku no Video	Inoue	OVA	
1991	Honō no Tōkyūji: Dodge Danpei	Yuji Takeda, Kazami		
1992	Mama wa Shōgaku 4 Nensei	Mario Vittori		
1992	The Bush Baby	Andrew Rose		
1992	Tekkaman Blade	Watts		
1992	Oi! Ryoma	Taisuke Inui		
1992	Tottoi	Reinhart		
1992	My Patrasche	Passerby, villager B		
1993	Ocean Waves	Okada		
1993	Sonic Soldier Borgman II: New Century 2058	Ken Minai	OVA	
1994–2010	Crayon Shin-chan	Carpenter, Kazama's father		
1994	Marmalade Boy	Ginta Suou		
1994	Sailor Moon S	Asai Tsutomu	Ep. 100	
1994	Tonde Burin	Tamio Kitagawa	Ep. 31	
1994	Magical Circle Guru Guru	Prince Zabun		
1994	Magic Knight Rayearth	Zazu Torque		
1995	World Fairy Tale Series	Prince		
1995–present	Nintama Rantarō	Raizo Fuwa, Quayle Castella, samurai, soldier		
1995	Nurse Angel Ririka SOS	Foggy	Ep. 6, 15	
1995	Saint Tail	Toru Ijuuin	Ep. 17	
1996	Rurouni Kenshin	Chris		
1996	Dragon Ball GT	Kukan Sugoroku		
1996	Sailor Moon: Sailor Stars	DJ Jack	Ep. 189	
1996	Hell Teacher Nube	Shuichi Shirato		
1996	Blue Seed 2	Man (Criminal)	OVA	
1996	Kiko-chan's Smile	Michael		
1997	Ninpen Manmaru	Momosuke		
1998	Sexy Commando Gaiden: Sugoi yo!! Masaru-san	Okometsubu Fujiyama (Fūmin)		
1998	Trigun	DJ		
1999	Shukan Storyland ja:週刊ストーリーランド	Yoshiki Hayashi		
2000	Ceres, Celestial Legend	Man		
2001	Earth Maiden Arjuna	English teacher		
2001	Digimon Tamers	Ryo Akiyama		
2001	Hikaru no Go	American person		
2002	G-On Riders	Foreigner		
2003–2005	Sonic X	Sonic the Hedgehog		
2004	Hamtaro とっとこハム太郎 はむはむぱらだいちゅ！	Gaijin man		
2004	Samurai Champloo	American soldier		
2004–2006	Pokémon: Advanced Generation	Harley		
2005	Glass Mask	Peter Hamill		
2005	Mushiking: The King of Beetles	Bu		
2005	Speed Grapher	Child soldier		
2006	Zenmai Zamurai	Merchant Pierre, Kawara Banban, et al		
2006	.hack//Roots	Ochi		
2006	Kirarin Revolution	Chairperson		
2007	Yes! PreCure 5	Michel Kasugano		
2007	Saint Beast: Kouin Jojishi Tenshi Tan	Supreme God Zeus		
2009	Hetalia: Axis Powers	Narrator	ONA	
2009	Gokyōdai Monogatari ご姉弟物語	Alan		
2010	Doraemon	Ayao Itotori	Episode: "I'll Be the King of String Finger World"	
2011	Hunter × Hunter	Buhara	2011 TV Series	
2014	Akatsuki no Yona: Yona of the Dawn	Ik-Su		
2017	The Reflection	Male counselor		

=== Anime films ===
List of voice performances
Year	Title	Role	Notes	Source
1986	Captain Tsubasa: Sekai Daikessen!! Jr. World Cup	Shun Nitta		
1986	Touch 2: Goodbye Gift	Manabu Ōgawara		
1990	Chinpui: Eri-sama Katsudō Daishashin	Masao Koyama (Konsaburō Kozune)		
1995	Slam Dunk: Shohoku's Greatest Challenge!	Ichiro Katsumi		
1996	Hell Teacher: Jigoku Sensei Nube	Shuichi Shirato		
2002	Digimon Tamers: Runaway Locomon	Ryo Akiyama		
2006	Gunbuster vs. Diebuster	Representative		
2008	Night of the Werehog	Sonic the Hedgehog		
2009	Pyu to Fuku! Jaguar:Ima, Fuki ni Yukimasu	Kiyohiko "Piyohiko" Saketome		
2009	Evangelion: 2.0 You Can (Not) Advance	Narrator		
2011	Gekijō-ban Anime Nintama Rantarō Ninjutsu Gakuen Zenin Shutsudō! no Dan	Raizo Fuwa		
2011	Suite Precure The Movie: Take it back! The Miraculous Melody that Connects Hearts!	Natural		
2024	Nintama Rantarō: Invincible Master of the Dokutake Ninja	Fuwa Raizo		

=== Video games ===
List of voice performances
Year	Title	Role	Notes	Source
1997	Hell Teacher: Jigoku Sensei Nube	Shuichi Shirato	PS1/PS2	
1997	Farland Story: Yottsu no Fuuin	Arc	PS1/PS2	
1998	G.A.S.P!! Fighters' NEXTream	Kai Himuro	Nintendo 64	
1998	Atelier Elie: The Alchemist of Salburg 2	Douglas McClain	PS1/PS2	
1998–present	Sonic the Hedgehog	Sonic the Hedgehog	starting from Sonic Adventure	
1999	Shinseiki GPX Cyber Formula: Aratanaru Chousensha	Kazami Hayato	PlayStation	
1999	Kuroi hitomi no noa: Cielgris Fantasm ja:黒い瞳のノア	Disutin	PS1/PS2	
2001	Fatal Frame	Mafuyu Hinasaki	PS1/PS2	
2003	Atelier Viorate: The Alchemist of Gramnad 2	Bartholomaus Platane	PS1/PS2	
2005	Konjiki no Gash Bell!! Unare! Yūjō no Zakeru Dream Tag Tournament	Makoto Raiku	Other	
2008–present	Super Smash Bros.	Sonic the Hedgehog	starting from Super Smash Bros. Brawl	
2010	Nintama Rantarou: Gakunen Taikousen Puzzle! no Dan	Raizo Fuwa	DS	
2011	Atelier Viorate: The Alchemist of Gramnad 2: The Memories of Ultramarine	Bartholomaus Platane	PSP	
2019	Atelier Nelke: The Alchemists and the New Earth	Bartholomaus Platane (Barthel)	PS4/PS Vita	

=== Radio ===
Year	Title	Role	Notes	Sources
1992	Youth Radimenia	Himself	Guest appearance on March 14.	
1995–1997	Picture Land Club II	Himself	Radio program broadcast on Kansai Radio. In 1999, a Christmas CD single, Picture Land Club 2.5 was released.	(In Japanese)
2005	Sunrise EX	Himself	Guest appearance on the Sunrise EX block of Sunrise Radio. Broadcast July 30 on KBC Radio, and July 31 on Tokai Radio and HBC Radio.	
2005	Youth Radimenia	Himself	Appearance on August 27, presenting a listener gift.	

=== Music CDs ===
Year	Title	Notes	Sources
1997	Midwinter Shooting Star	Only sung the eponymously-titled song as part of WITH YOU.	

=== Drama CDs ===
List of voice performances
Title	Role	Notes	Source
Houshin Engi	Shin Kouhyou	Drama CD	
Pyu to Fuku! Jaguar:Ima, Fuki ni Yukimasu	Kiyohiko "Piyohiko" Saketome	Drama CD	
Dragon Quest IV	Rei (Hero)	Drama CD	
Shout Out Loud!	Shino Hasae	Drama CD	
Innocent Size	Nanase Hiroto	Drama CD	
Dousei Ai	Chisato Kanemaki	Drama CD	
Futaba Rhapsody	Futaba Hanazono	Drama CD	
Mainichi Seiten!	Shuu Asuoo	Drama CD	
Koiki na Yatsura	Susumu Manabe	Drama CD Note: Not to be confused with the manga of the same name about a pair of female criminal twins.	
Lesson XX	Ichitarou Sakura	Drama CD	
Katakoi Paradise	Natsuhiko Ikegami	Drama CD	
Yebisu Celebrities	Leon (English)	Drama CD	
Tokyo Amatoria	Keiji Yoshikawa	Drama CD	
Akuma to Odore	Sasha	Drama CD	
C Kara Hajimaru Koi mo Ii	Hiromu Toujou	Drama CD	
Original CD Drama Naughty Boy	Masanori Yamada	Drama CD	
Reiko the Zombie Shop	Ideto Tanii	Drama CD	
The Young Magician Eyes of Destruction ACT.2	Ipuki	Drama CD	

=== Tokusatsu ===
List of voice performances
Year	Title	Role	Notes	Source
2003	Bakuryū Sentai Abaranger	Trinoid #5: Hakkarasniper		
2007	Kamen Rider Den-O	Chameleon Imagin		

=== Dubbing ===
List of dub performances in overseas productions
Title	Role(s)	Notes	Source
Captain Sindbad	Taran		
Clifford the Big Red Dog	Casey Howard		
Dora the Explorer	Swiper, father, Big Red Chicken, golden key, snow creatures		
Star Wars: Ewoks	Widdle	DVD version only	
Full House	Ricky		
Fraggle Rock	Additional voices	NHK dub	
Growing Pains	Bobby		
The Christ of Nanjing	Youngster		
Insektors	Fulgor		
Handy Manny	Pat, Elliot, Fast Eddie, et al		
Honey, I Blew Up the Kid	Nick	Original VHS/DVD dub	
The Legend of the Lone Ranger	Jack	TV Tokyo dub	
Wreck-It Ralph	Sonic the Hedgehog		
Ralph Breaks the Internet	Sonic the Hedgehog		
Sonic Boom	Sonic the Hedgehog		
Sonic Prime			
Thomas & Friends	Henry, Porter, Carlos, Owen	Succeeded Henry from Ryō Horikawa	
West Side Story	Rico	1990 TBS edition	
