= Karamatić =

Karamatić is a Croatian surname. Notable people with the surname include:

- George Karamatic (1917-2008), American football running back
- Žarko Karamatić (born 1988), Serbian football forward
- Tin Karamatić (born 1993), Croatian football defender
- Mateo Karamatic (born 2001), Austrian football defender
