= List of Future GPX Cyber Formula characters =

Characters From Anime Series Future GPX Cyber Formula

The following is a list of characters from the anime series Future GPX Cyber Formula, including all the characters in the TV series, the OVAs, and the games.

== Drivers ==
Hayato Kazami (風見 ハヤト, Kazami Hayato)
Voiced by: Jun'ichi Kanemaru, Shinobu Adachi (childhood) (Japanese); Paul Pistore (English)
National team: Japan
Affiliated team(s): Sugo Asurada (2015–2017) ⇒ Sugo Winners (2018–2019) ⇒ Sugo Grand Prix (2020–2021) ⇒ Sugo GIO Grand Prix (2022–)
The protagonist of the series. He is 152 cm tall in 2015 and grows up to 168 cm in 2022. His main nickname is "Ushiwakamaru," and he was born on March 28, 2001, with type A blood. His special skill is that he can make friends with anyone (according to him), and his hobby is riding motorcycles.
He was registered as an Asurada driver by accident due to an incident during transportation and entered the Grand Prix (TV series). He won the 5th round of the 10th World Championship in 2015, the British GP, and took his first win with a pole-to-win. In the following year, 2016 (11), he fell into a slump in the early stages due to the pressure of being the defending champion, and even after recovering from the slump, he was in a fierce battle with Schumacher from the middle of the season onward, but he won the overall championship and became the double-one champion. In the British GP (the beginning of ZERO), he stepped into the "Zero Zone" and crashed heavily with Randall, seriously injuring him, and temporarily retired, but returned the following year in the 5th round of the French GP, and overcame the Zero Zone through the fight with Kaga. In 2020 (SAGA), he overcame the Al-Zard incident and won the overall championship for the third time in four years. The following year, in 2021, he won again, showing his invincible strength, and was even called "the young emperor of the circuit." In 2022 (SIN), he fought a fierce one-on-one battle with Kaga, but narrowly lost.
From the TV series to 11, he is a bright and active boy, with his airheadedness being particularly prominent in the CD dramas, but after overcoming serious injuries in ZERO, he gradually developed a more relaxed personality. However, he is passionate about racing and hates to lose, and when his performance is poor, he is a bit selfish, lashing out at those around him. His drawback was that he was too conscious of his opponents, but by SIN, he has overcome this problem and matured both mentally and physically, becoming an absolute champion. In terms of romantic attraction, he is indifferent to everyone except Asuka, and he marries her at the end of SIN.
Osamu Sugō / Knight Schumacher (菅生 修 / ナイト・シューマッハ, Sugō Osamu / Naito Shūmahha)
Voiced by: Show Hayami (Japanese); Mark R. Kaufmann (English)
National team: (United Kingdom) Great Britain
Affiliated team(s): Union Savior (2015) ⇒ Aoi ZIP Formula (2016) ⇒ Sugo Grand Prix (Manager) (2017–)
Nicknamed "Supersonic Knight," he was born in Japan on August 9, 1994, is 182 cm tall, and has a blood type of B. His special skill is giving domineering advice, and his hobby is disguising.
Formerly an F1 driver for Missing Link, he joined Cyber Formula to conceal his true identity. He won his debut race in the opening round in the U.S., and finished second in the following round in Peru, making him a contender for the championship, but he was injured between the third and fourth rounds and was forced to withdraw. Realizing that he had little time left to live as a racer, he returned to CF from the fifth round of the British Grand Prix in 2016 (11) in order to teach Hayato the rigors of being a racer. Despite only competing from the 5th round, he wins 4 races in 5 rounds and joins the championship contenders. In the final race of the season in Japan, due to his optic nerve reaching its limit, he had to drive with his eyes closed for the last part of the race, relying only on the voice guidance of the cyber system.
He has many accomplishments as a racer and is a very confident person. When he reappeared in 11 as Schumacher, he often exasperated Hayato with his high-handed provocations. His skills as a racer are considerable, and he showed all kinds of moves, not only in frontal attacks, but also in the dirty side, such as obstructing the qualifying against Randall and feinting at the start, which Hayato must surpass to become a true racer. He retired after the final race of 2016 in 11 and became the manager of the Sugo team in ZERO. His eyesight, which at one point was reduced to the verge of blindness, has greatly improved thanks to subsequent advances in medical technology. In SAGA, his eyesight recovered enough to allow him to serve as a test driver while also serving as a manager, and he drove the Garland himself, taunting Hayato with techniques that belied his blanks, even though it was a test run.
In the cassette/CD dramas, he was made fun of for his well-timed phone calls and his preaching habits. The sunglasses from his time as Schumacher (a reference to his name) often appear in ZERO and later, worn by players from the Union under pseudonyms (but not serving to conceal their true identities). When he saw it, he became uncharacteristically agitated and showed a comical side.
His alias was named after Michael Schumacher. In the last part of the TV series, he is depicted as being at Benetton Formula, Schumacher's team at the time of the broadcast.
Naoki Shinjō (新条 直輝, Shinjō Naoki)
Voiced by: Hikaru Midorikawa (Japanese); Mark R. Kaufmann (English)
National team: Japan
Affiliated team(s): Aoi Formula (2015–2019) ⇒ Union Savior (2020–2022) ⇒ Aoi ZIP Formula (2023–)
Born on October 28, 1998. He is 175 cm tall and his blood type is B. His nicknames have changed rapidly, ranging from "genius" to "humble genius," to "young warrior," to "fleeing soldier" (according to Henri). His special skills are tea ceremony (his family is the head of a tea ceremony school), skiing, and jet skiing.
Like Kazami, he made his debut in the 10th championship of the TV series. He was the most promising Japanese driver, and his first prize, first podium, and first win came one race earlier than Kazami's, respectively. However, after a series of self-destructive races in rounds 3, 5, and 6, in which he was on the verge of winning the championship, he was dropped by the B team in round 7, the Africa GP. He is an elite driver, and at first, he and Kyōko Aoi were always sarcastic towards the inexperienced Kazami, but this setback changed his character completely. He is a hard worker and has many ups and downs, and "Shinjō = hardship and misfortune" has become a standard. His pride is comparable to Randall's, and when he suffered the aforementioned setback, he repeatedly lost reckless races, blaming the mechanics and others around him, but he recovered after being scolded by Miki and Kaga. When Nagumo, the new owner of the Aoi team, fired him from the team before the start of the 15th championship in 2020 (early in SAGA), he recovered on his own and went to the United States with Miki for training. In the 11th round of the 15th championship in Japan, he returned from Union Savior and won the championship with a victory over Al-Zard, which was brought in by Nagumo, and since then he has been a regular on the podium.
He and Miki Jōnouchi, the chief mechanic of Sugo, become indispensable partners (as they call themselves) in both their private and public lives over the course of the series, and they have romantic feelings for each other.
Jōtarō Kaga / Bleed Kaga (加賀 城太郎 / ブリード加賀, Kaga Jōtarō / Burīdo Kaga)
Voiced by: Toshihiko Seki
National team: Japan
Affiliated team(s): Aoi ZIP Formula (2015, 2018–2020, 2022)
Nicknames include "wild child of the circuit," "migratory bird of the circuit," and "bird of paradise head" (according to Henri). Born on April 1, 1996, he is 172 cm tall and his blood type is A. His special skill is abacus level 1 and his hobby is waxing cars. He is the main character in SIN.
His hair is a primary color with a flamboyant, inverted style. He is a lone racer who is quite famous in crash racing, and he first meets Hayato in the kidnapping of a girl. After that, he was treated as a supporting character, but entered Cyber Formula from the 10th championship and 7th round of the Africa GP in 2015. However, disliking the ties, he intentionally retired in the final Japanese GP of the same year against Kyōko's instructions and moved on to Indy thereafter; after winning the championship two years in a row, he returned to CF in 2018 (ZERO) for his first full season. He battled with Hayato in the Zero Zone and became lifelong rivals; he fought to the death with Hayato in the 17th championship in 2022 (SIN) and overcame him to win the championship title. After that, he retired from CF and returned to Indy.
He has a rough and dirty driving style, but his skill is high. In 11, he set faster times than Hayato's Super Asurada AKF-11 while driving Super Asurada 01, and in ZERO, he supported Shinjō in the one race in which Shinjō's dismissal was on the line, and he manipulated the machine in such a way that all the top cars retired from the race. However, although at first glance he may appear to be a violent driver, he is the type of driver who knows where the game is going, and outside of SIN, he has shown a steady side, avoiding most reckless battles in which there is little chance of victory.
In the beginning of the TV series, he was often portrayed as a money-grubber, but later on he became less so. He was also shown playing dirty with turbulence and dust.
Despite his easygoing appearance, he is shy and rather reserved toward women, and while he teases Kyōko by calling her the queen of Aoi and keeping his distance from her, he unconsciously became aware of her as a woman, and at the end of SIN, he accepted Kyōko's feelings as she tried to keep him out of the race even if it meant destroying the Ogre.
He was traumatized by the crash with Eiji Aizawa, who had once entered the Zero Zone with Kaga, but he shook off the trauma. In a conversation with Aizawa's son Hokuto, he hints at a return to racing.
Karl Lichter von Randall / Prince Rosenkreuz (カール・リヒター・フォン・ランドル, Kāru Rihitā fon Randoru / Purinsu Rōzenkuroitsu)
Voiced by: Yōko Matsuoka (Japanese); Edward Choy Keng Choong (English)
National team: Austria
Affiliated team(s): Union Savior (2015–), appeared as Prince Rosenkreuz in 2018
Born on July 7, 2001. Height 158 cm (as of 2015). Blood type AB. Nicknamed "Amadeus of the Circuit" because of his artistic driving. His hobby is playing the violin.
He is a child prodigy who has repeatedly won all kinds of sporting competitions, only to get bored after a short period of time and look for the next one. He made a spectacular debut with a pole-to-win in his debut race, the first in the history of CF. He also won the next round in Africa, setting a record of two consecutive wins after his debut. Both records were surpassed by Fritz's "three in a row," but Fritz's record was later erased, so Randall is the only one to hold both records at this time. He also showed particular strength in the qualifying rounds in the early days, winning 8 times in 11 rounds since his debut, including 5 consecutive rounds (across the season).
His family are nobles linked to the Austrian imperial household, and Randall himself is a marquis with the Austrian Crown Prince as his cousin. His initial motivation for entering CF was that he fell in love with Asuka at first sight and saw Hayato as his rival. At that time, he was a gentleman to women but somewhat frivolous, as he regarded Hayato as a mediocre racer inferior to himself and raced with him to kiss Asuka. After losing, he became serious about CF while maintaining his feelings for Asuka. Asuka and Hayato later engaged and his feelings for her were never reciprocated, but he continued his aggressive approach to Asuka until later years. When Hayato was kidnapped, he managed hundreds of millions of dollars to find him, and as a reward, he kissed Asuka on the cheek.
In the beginning, he was a young master in his speech, mannerisms, and etiquette, and enjoyed his tea time at the pit stop during races at his own pace, but by the time of SAGA, he had become a little rough around the edges in his language, and he began to drink out of a cup and throw it away during his pit stop tea time.
Jackie Guderian (ジャッキー・グーデリアン, Jakkī Gūderian)
Voiced by: Bin Shimada
National team: United States
Affiliated team(s): Star Stampede (2012–2015) ⇒ Strozek Project (2016) ⇒ Stormzender (2017–)
Nicknames include "The Running Stars and Stripes" (design sheets only) and "The High-Tech Cowboy." Born on May 1, 1995, his blood type is O. His special skill is rodeo, and his hobbies include sports in general (especially horseback riding).
He is an American driver who specializes in wild riding. In 2016 (11), he joined Strozek at the invitation of his rival Heinel, and in 2019 (beginning of SAGA), he won the 14th championship of his dreams.
Jovial to the core, he is comical but a playboy and always has a woman with him, but is shunned by Aya and Luisa. He often fights with Heinel, but it is never serious because they trust each other. He has the longest experience in CF among the current drivers.
He calls Hayato "Samurai Boy." In ZERO, his simple personality is taken advantage of and he falls right into Henri's trap, accusing Hayato of being a dangerous driver who could get others into trouble and even gets into a brawl with Boutsvorsz, but after witnessing Hayato's ever-evolving driving style, he reaffirms his ability.
His trunks are decorated with the stars and stripes. His family owns a supermarket chain, where one can get Guderian's autograph when they earn enough points (not very well received).
He is modeled after Nigel Mansell, while his name is based on Maurício Gugelmin, a Formula 1 driver at the time.
Franz Heinel (フランツ・ハイネル, Furantsu Haineru)
Voiced by: Ryōtarō Okiayu
National team: Germany
Affiliated team(s): Unknown team (2011) ⇒ ZIP Racing (2012–2014) S.G.M. (2015) ⇒ Strozek Project (Manager and car designer, later driver, 2016–2019) ⇒ Stormzender (2020–2021) ⇒ retired as driver to concentrate on being a manager and car designer (2022–)
Born December 23, 1994, blood type AB. His special skills are languages, boxing and cooking, and his hobby is collecting pots.
He is the son of a prestigious family that owns the German car company Strobrahms. In the 10th tournament of the TV series in 2015, when he moved to S.G.M., an affiliate team of Strobrahms, he competed in the Silent Screamer Beta, a linear-wheeled car he designed himself, and won the third round of the survival race in Brazil, and was the points leader at the end of the fourth round in Canada. However, he was unable to add any points to his tally due to a series of retirements from the middle of the season, and finished the year in 5th place in the championship standings.
In 2016, he formed his own Team Strozek for the 11th round (11). With Guderian as his driver, he developed a rolling cockpit machine, the Stil. As he was the team's director and machine designer that year, he only drove as a spot driver in the final race in Japan as a substitute for Guderian, who was injured and had to miss the race. From the following year until his retirement at the 16th round in 2021 (beginning of SIN), he again competed as a driver for five years.
In the TV series, he was introduced as the "No. 1 finisher," based on his results up to the previous year, but he was surprisingly prone to hot temper and had many retirements in the story. He is also a competent driver, having surpassed Guderian in the rankings in some years, and was the points leader until the midway point in the 13th event, and was involved in a three-way battle for the championship with Kaga and Henri. But being a director, designer, and driver seems to be tough, and the later years were a bust. However, in 2019 (at the beginning of SAGA), Guderian, driving Heinel's Stil HG-165, won the championship at the 14th edition of the competition.
His hair usually stands on end, but when he rides his machine, he wears it down to put on his helmet. Although he was supposed to wear "window glass" lens glasses in the design sheets, the truth is unknown because he wears glasses or sports goggles (SAGA) even during races. He has a complex about his gentle looks, so he intentionally makes an intense face with his glasses and wrinkles between his eyebrows. He is overwhelmed by his sister, Lisa.
When not involved with Guderian, he has a calm and intelligent personality. When Henri tried to spread infamy about Hayato in ZERO, he took a neutral attitude and did not accuse Hayato.
He is an example of a man too versatile to stand out from the crowd. He has the advantage of being able to test the machines he builds himself, but he is not able to make the most of it.
As a fellow designer, he is interested in Claire, but he can't keep up with her thinking.
He is modeled after Alain Prost.
Jōji Ōtomo (大友 譲二, Ōtomo Jōji)
Voiced by: Kōsuke Yoshikawa (Japanese); Mark R. Kaufmann (English)
National team: Japan
Affiliated team(s): Albatross DDT (2014–2015) ⇒ retired from CF and became a rally driver after working as a commentator
Born January 1, 1997, blood type O. His hobby is professional wrestling.
He finished second in the 2015 All-Japan Grand Prix, which Shinjō won, and entered Cyber Formula from that year's 10th World Championship along with Shinjō and Kazami (TV series). He was strong on off-road courses and was nicknamed the "natural child of the circuit" and "off-road demon," but he did not perform well in the World Championship because he was reckless and did not rely on the cyber system. In the 9th round of the German GP, he and Kazami crashed together, and due to injuries all over his body, it became difficult for him to return to racing, and he withdrew from CF thereafter (the Albatross DDT team, which Ōtomo was a member of, also withdrew from CF in 2019).
After recovering, he worked as a reporter (due to the elimination of off-roading from the 11th CF), and after giving up CF, he returned as a rally driver. After participating in the Paris-Dakar Rally and competing for the title in the World Rally Championship, he has achieved great success.
In 11, he appears to give advice to Hayato, who is suffering from poor performance. In ZERO, he appears in the opening animation but does not appear in the main story, and has not appeared in any of the subsequent series.
He is from Hokkaido and always has food (dairy products) in his bag.
Edelhi Boutsvorsz (エデリー・ブーツホルツ, Ederī Būtsuhorutsu)
Voiced by: Naoki Tatsuta (Japanese); Mark R. Kaufmann (English)
National team: Russia
Affiliated team(s): Missing Link (2015–2022) ⇒ Sugo GIO Grand Prix (2023–)
Born on August 8, 1993, his blood type is O. His special skill is cooking (piroshki is his specialty), and his hobby is darts. He has a cat named Josephine.
He lost his left eye and left arm in an F1 racing accident, but returned as a racer with prosthetic parts. Because of this debt of gratitude, he helped Smith at Missing Link in his nefarious scheme to target Asurada in a crash disguised as an accident, but he failed at every attempt. After a match race with Osamu Sugō, he reforms and devotes himself to racing. Although his car Missionel has no outstanding new technology, inferior engine power, and is outperformed by other top teams, Boutsvorsz frequently finishes in the top positions, such as 4th place in the ranking at the 16th edition of the championship. He has always finished on the podium at least once every year, and in the 10th round of the 12th tournament (ZERO episode 1) in his home country of Russia, he took his first Grand Prix victory. Although he is the oldest driver in CF and a veteran, he is still only 29 years old at the time of the 17th tournament, and he has declared that he will drive until he is 40 years old (in 2033). He moved to Sugo from the 18th tournament onward. His nicknames include "Dokuganryū" and "Oxidized Silver."
At first, he had an eerie air about him, but since he and Smith parted ways, he has shown a calm presence as a veteran. In ZERO, he defends Hayato against Guderian's criticism of him by explaining that racing is always dangerous. In SAGA, however, his cyborg parts were replaced with the latest technology, and his appearance has been changed to look more natural.
He has been friends with Osamu and Claire since their F1 days, and at the end of SIN, he and Claire are wearing Schumacher sunglasses and teasing Osamu. He and Osamu have celebrated each other's birthdays across dates, as their birthdays are only one day apart. When drunk, he does a Cossack dance.
He is named after Thierry Boutsen, an F1 driver at the time.
Pitalha Lopes (ピタリア・ロペ, Pitaria Rope)
Voiced by: Tomomichi Nishimura
National team: Brazil
Affiliated team(s): ZIP Racing (2008) ⇒ Koh-i-Noor Formula (2009–2011) ⇒ A.G.S. (2012–2015) ⇒ retired and became manager of A.G.S. (2016–)
Born on April 7, 1985, blood type O. His special skills are 1,000 push-ups, and his hobby is collecting antiques.
He has been the champion in the 7th (2012) and 9th (2014) editions of the tournament, and is known as the "Star of Brazil" in his native Brazil.
In the 10th round of the TV series in 2015, he was the defending champion, and although he won the second round in Peru, he was outclassed by the performance of his machine from the midpoint of the race. He was still in with a chance of an upsetting successive championship until the final round in Japan, where he retired after a battle for third place with Kaga. He retired as a driver at the end of that year, and took over the helm of his team, A.G.S., with Hiyoshi as his successor. He later gave up on Hiyoshi and brought in Nina and Anderson, but Hiyoshi was still ahead of him in the rankings. Looking at the results of Nina and Anderson, he decided it was a mistake to cut Hiyoshi. Hiyoshi was not an outstanding driver either, but it was obvious that there were problems with the performance of the car after the 11th race, and by the 14th tournament, there were no points.
He is modeled after Nelson Piquet, the Brazilian hero in F1 at the time.
Henri Claytor (アンリ・クレイトー, Anri Kureitō)
Voiced by: Hiro Yūki
National team: France
Affiliated team(s): Theodolite T.T (2017) ⇒ Sugo Grand Prix (2018–2021) ⇒ Sugo GIO Grand Prix (2022) ⇒ Missing Link (2023–)
Born in France, June 6, 2003, blood type AB. His special skill is posing as someone he's not, and his hobby is sculpture.
He sees Hayato as an enemy due to childhood trauma, and is the cause of the big crash between Hayato and Randall at the 2017 12th round of the British GP (beginning of ZERO) (However, in this race, he finished 5th with a weak team, Theodolite, which until the previous year had been a regular failure to qualify. Theodolite withdrew from the race that year, but became the parent team of Sugou Winners, to which Kazami belonged for two years from the following year). He had a two-sided personality, which remained unchanged even after his transfer to Sugo, and caused many problems. With Kazami's support, he became the third Frenchman to win the championship title at the 13th tournament (ZERO) in his second year of debut, but he has been stagnant since then, and due to his personality problems, he was released from the team in 2022 and transferred to Missing Link. He has been in constant conflict with Leon since his days in Sugo.
Since he was a child, he and his father worked together to become the youngest CF champion, but when Hayato became the youngest champion before Henri, his father gave up on him. Because of his resentment, he sees Hayato as an enemy. When he is alone with Hayato, he speaks out of turn and spreads infamies about Hayato. He also has an extreme two-faced personality, acting as a meek boy on the surface but sneering at other people behind their backs. At the end of ZERO, Hayato reminds him of what he is racing for, and he changes his mind. After that, he clearly expresses his likes and dislikes. He is a docile boy to those he likes, and he does not hide his harsh attitude to those he dislikes. He is especially extreme toward those who approach Hayato, even if it is Asuka, and he interferes with them. He is always fighting with Megumi Shinohara over Hayato.
He enjoys sculpting and carves with resentment.
Off-season in 2019 (SAGA episode 1), he once missed a test due to measles, and in the 16th tournament, he missed the third round of the South African GP due to a broken bone from skiing.
Phil Fritz (フィル・フリッツ, Firu Furittsu)
Voiced by: Atsushi Kisaichi
National team: United States
Affiliated team(s): Aoi ZIP Formula (2020–) ⇒ retired as driver and became a mechanic
Born on February 14, 2001, his blood type is A. His special skill is patience, and his hobby is drawing.
He is a newcomer from the U.S., brought over from NASCAR by Nagumo in SAGA. In his debut race, the opening round of the 15th championship, he set a course record in qualifying for the U.S. Grand Prix, and went on to win the race with a pole-to-win finish. He continued his amazing run, winning 4 out of the 5 races, but this was due to the bio-computer installed in Al-Zard, which controlled Fritz's body with a new nervous system drug called "Alpha Neuro" (in the 4th round in France, he retired due to trouble with the Alpha Neuro). Fritz, who did not want to repeat the misery of his poor performance in NASCAR, rode Al-Zard as Nagumo told him to, but when Kazami and Kyōko found out about it, they persuaded him and he gradually began to question Nagumo and his actions. In the 11th round of the Japanese GP, when Nagumo abducted Kazami, he greatly contributed to the rescue of Kazami, and when Al-Zard triggered a program to destroy Asurada, he risked his life to stop it, and immediately after that, he drove the car himself, but the damage caused a serious crash, wrecking the car and seriously injuring Fritz himself. Aoi was disqualified from all races for this Al-Zard Incident, his driver's points were erased, and Fritz retired and returned to the United States. Thereafter, he began training as a mechanic under Gray Stanbeck, a close friend of Kaga's. In 2022 (SIN), he and Gray returned to Aoi as mechanics to support Kaga.
He is the first black driver among the main drivers in Cyber Formula, and he dyes his hair blonde.
At first he was taciturn and did not speak much, but after his reappearance in SIN, he is able to converse normally and has become a quiet and gentle young man.
Leon Earnhardt (レオン・アンハート, Reon Anhāto)
Voiced by: Nobutoshi Canna
National team: Spain
Affiliated team(s): Missing Link (2020–)
Born in Spain, May 18, 2001, blood type B. His special skill is retiring and his hobby is collecting figurines.
He made his debut with Missing Link as a teammate of Boutsvorsz in the 15th edition of the two-car team in 2020, and moved to CF as one of NASCAR's top drivers, but his driving was rough and he did not fulfill his lapping duties, which led to a pileup of crashes involving other cars. In his debut year, the 15th tournament, he retired from 10 consecutive races after his debut, and he became infamous for always involving someone else when he retired. Leon's moves that year were unpredictable even for the Zero Zone and Al-Zard, and Kazami, Kaga, and Fritz have all been retired by Leon (Randall and Claytor have also been hit by him once each). Kazami, in particular, was hit in three of the five races in which he participated in Garland, and had to retire in two of them, which contributed to his slump in the first half of the season.
In fact, he is reasonably fast, but after the 16th race, although not as fast as in the 15th, he still had many retirements and crashes, and could have been dismissed at any time, making Missing Link a very patient team. From the 18th tournament, he has Claytor as his new teammate, but they have not been able to come to terms since Claytor's time in Sugo.
He only listens to Boutsvorsz, the senior member of the team. He is as much of a womanizer as Guderian, and even Guderian is taken aback by his fondness for women.
He was a friend of Fritz's in NASCAR, and was surprised to see Fritz, who was a dropout, run solo in his debut race.
His last name is taken from one of NASCAR's leading drivers, Dale Earnhardt, Sr.
Akira Hiyoshi (日吉 明, Hiyoshi Akira)
Voiced by: Bin Shimada
National team: Japan
Affiliated team(s): Sugo Asurada (2014) ⇒ Koh-i-Noor Formula (2015, 2020–) ⇒ A.G.S. (2016–2019)
Born on August 21, 1997, his blood type is A. His special skill is cooking, and his hobby is watching movies.
He was originally scheduled to drive for Sugo in the Asurada, but due to a mistake, Kazami was registered, so he left the team and went to Brazil, where he was discovered by Lopes. Although he says that he had a very hard time, it was not that long ago that he entered CF through Koh-i-Noor in the third round of the Brazilian GP held in Brazil, where he had a good geographical advantage, and he was lucky to get 2nd place out of the gate, even though the race was rough. After moving to A.G.S. to replace the retired Lopes, he was pushed back by the top teams, partly due to the difference in performance of the machines, and his only podium finishes were two 3rd places in the 12th tournament.
He left A.G.S. after finishing with no points in the 14th tournament, and returned to Koh-i-Noor the following year. Although he finished with no points in the 15th tournament, he finished in the 16th and 17th events, showing his determination by not losing the ranking to his A.G.S. successors, Nina and Anderson.
Marie Albert Luisa (マリー・アルベルト・ルイザ, Marī Aruberuto Ruiza)
Voiced by: Masako Katsuki (CD dramas and video games only)
National team: Switzerland
Affiliated team(s): Sevenage RT (2016–2019) ⇒ K.A.M. Stampede (2020–2021) ⇒ Stormzender (2022–)
Born in Switzerland, August 11, 1997, blood type O. Her hobby is snowboarding.
She made her debut at the 11th event as the second female CF driver in 8 years. At first, she was called the queen of retirements, but from the 12th race onward, she often finished in the middle and lower positions, and showed that she could make up for it with her results. She was recognized for her success and moved to Stormzender to replace Heinel, who had retired, and struggled in the unfamiliar Spiegel circuit. Her best result in the finals was only 5th, but she finished more races than Guderian, so she must have contributed to the maturation of Spiegel. She had a license to run anything on land, and she said that she or Kaga were the champions of the types of races she ran.
She is mature for her age, and she makes light of Guderian. Her female rivalry with Gallagher is noteworthy.
Seiichirō Shiba (司馬 誠一郎, Shiba Seiichirō)
Voiced by: Akira Ishida (Road to the Evolution and Road to the Infinity 2–4 only)
National team: Japan
Affiliated team(s): Sugo Winners (2020) ⇒ Aoi ZIP Formula (2023–)
The main character of the PS1 game Future GPX Cyber Formula: A New Challenger. He is a Sugo test driver for 2020. He participated and won the "Extreme Speed" event (New Challenger) held after the World Championships in the same year from Sugo. He is Aoi's driver from the 18th championship onwards.
"Seiichirō Shiba" is his default name in A New Challenger and can be changed.
Sera Gallagher (セラ・ギャラガー, Sera Gyaragā)
Voiced by: Shiho Kikuchi (Road to the Infinity 2–4 only)
National team: (United Kingdom) Great Britain
Affiliated team(s): Union Savior (2023–)
Born in England. After passing Randall's test, she became a driver for Union Savior as Shinjō's replacement. She is the third female driver in CF history, and with the arrival of Sera, for the first time there are two female drivers in the race at the same time, along with Luisa.
Tōma Mikami (三神 刀真, Mikami Tōma)
Voiced by: Kenji Nojima
National team: Japan
Affiliated team(s): Phoenix Japan Racing (2024–) (Road to the Infinity 3–4 only)
The protagonist of the game Road to the Infinity 3. He is a hot-blooded man with a free-spirited and uninhibited vibe at first glance. He has a big mouth, but he also puts in the effort behind the scenes to match it. Driving the Advanced Phoenix, he creates a whirlwind in the CF world with his special "Comet Turn." 17 years old.
Rei Kanna (神奈 玲, Kanna Rei)
Voiced by: Miyuki Sawashiro
National team: Japan
Affiliated team(s): Phoenix Japan Racing (2024–) (Road to the Infinity 3–4 only)
She is the fourth female driver in CF history and the first Japanese racer.
Andrea Dibiano (アンドレア・ディビアーノ, Andorea Dibiāno)
Voiced by: Nobuyuki Hiyama
National team: Italy
Affiliated team(s): Team CF Ground (2024–) (Road to the Infinity 3–4 only)
A snobbish Italian. He is a cool, shrewd genius with a refined sense of style. 18 years old.
Mark Fernandez (マーク・フェルナンデス, Māku Ferunandesu)
Voiced by: Showtaro Morikubo
National team: Spain
Affiliated team(s): Team CF Ground (2024–) (Road to the Infinity 3–4 only)
A flippant racer. Not bad in character, but easily rattled. He is 18 years old and has an inseparable relationship with his teammate Andrea. He was born in the United States with Spanish roots.
John Cleeve (ジョン・クリーブ, Jon Kurību)
Voiced by: Kazuyuki Sogabe
National team: United States
Affiliated team(s): S.G.M. (2007–2010)
A legendary American driver who once won 21 championships in 42 races held from the 2nd to the 5th tournaments, becoming the first driver in history to win the championship two years in a row. He won the most championships of all time until he was surpassed by Hayato in the 15th tournament. In the off-season before the 6th tournament, he was seriously injured in an accident while trying to avoid a girl who ran out onto the road, but he retired without disclosing the accident out of concern for the girl's future. In 2015, he participated in a local bicycle race and showed indomitable fighting spirit, encouraging Hayato, who was desperate enough to leave the team temporarily.

== Team officials ==
=== Sugo (Asurada, Grand Prix, Winners, GIO Grand Prix) ===
Asurada (アスラーダ, Asurāda)
Voiced by: Kenichi Ono (Japanese); Paul Pistore (English)
A super-neurocomputer AI for cyber systems (CS) with advanced growth and learning capabilities developed by Hiroyuki Kazami, Hayato's father, and installed in Sugo cyber machines, or a generic name for the project to create such an AI. It was developed with the concepts of "creation of the ultimate racing car" and "true fusion of man and machine" in pursuit of ways for humans to master increasingly advanced and high-performance cars.
One of the features is the driver registration system incorporated to support the learning function. Hayato, who originally drove only to transport the machine, is registered as a driver because he was the first passenger.
What differentiates this cyber system from other CSs is that it has its own personality as a character, such as being able to speak and understand emotions. The machine is able to evolve as it grows by taking into account the skills and emotions of the driver, so there is no conflict between the machine and the driver as in the case of the Ogre.
In addition, Hiroyuki, who feared the use of CS Asurada for military purposes, protected it to prevent its implantation, and gave it system transfer software and the password "live to make your dream come true" to unlock it.
The combination of this system and the driver has room for evolution, so there is no limit to its speed, and even when it is surpassed, it immediately becomes faster than it was before, always maintaining top-class results.
Asuka Sugō (菅生 あすか, Sugō Asuka)
Voiced by: Kotono Mitsuishi (Japanese); Marian Elizabeth Spencer (English)
The heroine of the series. Born on March 14, 1999, her blood type is O. Her special skill is cooking (according to herself), and her hobby is shopping. She is not a good cook (though she is described as having improved in later years), and she is not a good driver.
She participates in the Sugo Asurada team in the capacity of deputy owner. In reality, however, she is the team's mascot, dressing up in grid girl-like tight-fitting costumes. She and Hayato have known each other since childhood, as her father, Kojirō, and Hayato's father, Hiroyuki, are best friends. She is worried about her brother, whom she has not heard from since he ran away from their parents' house a few years ago.
She spent 2015 (TV series) with the team, and as she experienced various things, she and Hayato developed a close relationship and became lovers by the end of the season; she supported Hayato's recovery from his serious accident in early 2017 (beginning of ZERO) and became engaged to Hayato during his rehabilitation, but was angry when he was forced to break his promise of retirement. She breaks off the engagement with Hayato, ending the relationship with him, and temporarily distances herself from him and the rest of the team, but with the advice of Miki and Claire, she begins to show up at races again. The day before the final race of ZERO, Hayato asks her to get engaged again, which she accepts. Although the timing of her entrance exam is unknown, she passes the transfer examination for Columbia University, and after the final race, she goes to the U.S. to pursue her career as a doctor. At the end of SIN, she finally married Hayato.
Her hair was long at first, but she cut it short in the middle of ZERO when her engagement broke off, and has grown it long again since SAGA, changing the shape of the hairstyle to a shaggy cut and other styles.
Tetsuichirō Kurumada (車田 鉄一郎, Kurumada Tetsuichirō)
Voiced by: Shōzō Iizuka, Kōzō Shioya (17 years old) (Japanese); Mark R. Kaufmann (English)
The manager of Sugo Asurada, born November 1, 1968, blood type O. His hobby is bonsai. He is also a former mechanic who in his younger days teamed up with Hiroyuki Kazami and Kōjirō Sugo to achieve success in Cyber Formula.
He felt responsible for Hayato's serious accident in early 2017 (beginning of ZERO) and temporarily retired, but in 2018 (ZERO) he returned as team manager in Sugo Winners, which he entered in conjunction with Hayato's return; from 2019 onwards he is a Sugo officer and does not appear from SAGA onwards.
Miki Jōnouchi (城之内 みき, Jōnouchi Miki)
Voiced by: Shinobu Adachi (Japanese); Marian Elizabeth Spencer (English)
Team(s): Sugo Asurada (2015–2017) ⇒ Sugo Winners (2018) ⇒ Aoi Formula (2019) ⇒ Union Savior (2020–2022) ⇒ Aoi ZIP Formula (2023)
Chief mechanic of the Sugo Asurada team. She communicates with the drivers and works on car setups, in effect playing the role of a race engineer. She is highly trusted by the team and drivers. She was born on November 5, 1998, and her blood type is AB. Her special skills are car maintenance and wrench juggling, and her hobby is listening to music (especially rock music).
She and Shinjō had an acrimonious relationship when they first met in 2015 (TV series), but they gradually grew closer and became romantically involved.
In the 2016 (11) season, she was overwhelmed by designer Claire Fortran's engineering abilities and considered leaving the team, but recovered, thanks in part to Shinjō's encouragement. When Sugo was suspended in 2017 (ZERO) due to Hayato's departure, Aoi Kyōko's concern for Shinjō led her to be recruited by Aoi for the following season, but she refused the transfer offer and stayed with Sugo to wait for Hayato's return. After fighting through the season with the returned Hayato, she moved to Aoi Formula to fight with Shinjō in the 2019 (ZERO ending) season.
After moving to Aoi, she and Shinjō cooperated with races, and even after Shinjō was fired from the team before the start of the 2020 season (SAGA, early part), they traveled to the U.S. to race together, and when he returned to CF from Union at the end of the season, she returned with Shinjō, and in 2023 (SIN ending), she moved to Aoi ZIP with Shinjō. Their relationship seems to have become more intimate since the time they moved to the U.S.
Ryōhei Sumi (角 良平, Sumi Ryōhei)
Voiced by: Tatsuya Matsuda (TV–ZERO), Naoki Tatsuta (SAGA–) (Japanese); Mark R. Kaufmann (English)
A mechanic since the time of the Sugo Asurada team. Small in stature, with a bandana as his trademark, he is affectionately known as "Pei." Born on May 17, 2000, his blood type is AB.
In the beginning, he often clashed with Hayato. He once aspired to be a racer, but had to give up on his dream because of his special blood type. After Miki Jōnouchi moved to Aoi, he became chief mechanic in charge of Hayato, and in the third round of the 2020 Canadian GP, he was unable to fix Garland's car trouble on his own and called Claire, who was not present, to consult with her, a mistake that infuriated Hayato.
Shinsuke Maki (牧 伸介, Maki Shinsuke)
Voiced by: Hiroshi Takemura
Telemetry staff since the time of the Sugo Asurada team. Mainly responsible for information analysis using computers. Born on July 12, 1996, his blood type is B. His hobby is designing computer games.
He is tall, soft-spoken, and speaks respectfully even to younger people.
At first, he could not get used to changing tires, so he trained by himself in the middle of the night until he got over it.
Kōjirō Sugō (菅生 幸二郎, Sugō Kōjirō)
Voiced by: Kazuhiko Kishino, Kōsuke Meguro (17 years old)
President of the car manufacturer Sugo and father of Osamu and Asuka, born on May 5, 1968, blood type O. As a young driver, he teamed up with Hiroyuki Kazami and Tetsuichirō Kurumada to achieve success in CF. He competed in the first and second (2006–2007) World GPs, but failed to achieve any results due to the thick walls of the world.
Claire Fortran (クレア・フォートラン, Kurea Fōtoran)
Voiced by: Yumi Tōma
A machine designer who created Asurada with Hiroyuki Kazami, born March 2, 1994, blood type AB. Her special skill is speed reading and her hobby is playing tennis. Osamu Sugō is her lover, but she seems to be tacitly aware that Osamu has other girlfriends besides her.
In 2015 (TV series) she was a member of the F1 team with Osamu, who returned to the team, but Osamu asked her to join Sugo Asurada in the middle of the 2016 (11) season. After joining the team, she built Super Asurada AKF-11 and contributed to winning the championship two years in a row. She also brought professional rigor to the team. After the season, she seemed to leave racing with Osamu, who retired, but after Hayato's accident in the 2017 season, she returned with Osamu and became an indispensable part of Sugo thereafter as a machine designer and engineer. Apart from the Asurada series, which she inherited from Hiroyuki Kazami, she also developed the Garland series on her own, and contributed greatly to Henri's overall victory in the 13th edition of the championship.
Megumi Shinohara (篠原 めぐみ, Shinohara Megumi)
Voiced by: Tomoko Ishimura
A poster girl for Sugo Grand Prix. She has a liking for Hayato and applied for the job in order to get close to him. However, Hayato, who is insensitive, is unaware of her affection.
Satsuki Nanase (七瀬 さつき, Nanase Satsuki)
Voiced by: Yuri Amano
A poster girl for Sugo Grand Prix. She applied and was selected for the purpose of stepping up her career in the entertainment industry.
Daisuke Amagi (天城 大介, Amagi Daisuke)
Voiced by: Kazuya Ichijō
An engineer at GIO Corporation, which supplies engines to Sugo from 2022 (SIN). He speaks in Kansai dialect.
V8 (ブイハチ, Buihachi)
A female Siberian Husky owned by Asuka. In 2017 (ZERO episode 1), she gave birth to five puppies, one of which, Shirohachi, would later be kept at Hayato's house. Born September 18, 2010.

=== Aoi (Formula, ZIP Formula) ===
Kyōko Aoi (葵 今日子, Aoi Kyōko)
Voiced by: Yuri Amano (Japanese); Marian Elizabeth Spencer (English)
The daughter of the president of the car manufacturer Aoi Automobile Industries and president of Aoi's racing company, she was born on September 30, 1995, and her blood type is B. She speaks English, German, French, Italian, and Chinese, and her hobby is scuba diving.
She has a high self-esteem, and is very particular about winning, immediately firing mechanics who make mistakes, treating the underperforming Aoi Formula as a sub-team, and treating the newly acquired Aoi ZIP as the number one team, assigning new cars and new drivers. The same is true for Shinjō, who was given a new car without regard to his wishes, and demoted to the number two team when his performance did not improve. However, her dictatorial, victory-oriented personality gradually rounded out, and as her feelings for Shinjō grew stronger, she began to protect Shinjō at all costs, including giving supportive instructions to Schumacher for Shinjō's victory, defending Shinjō at the cost of her own position when Shinjō was insulted by Aoi headquarters, and prioritizing Shinjō's victory over Kaga's.
In 2020, she handed over the presidency to Kyōshirō Nagumo before the season started (SAGA, early part), and although Shinjō was also fired, she remained with the company, investigating and prosecuting Nagumo and Al-Zard's secret. After Nagumo's arrest, she returned to the position of president and, after a one-year suspension, won the championship in 2022 (SIN) with Kaga, but left Aoi after the season. She had a long relationship with Kaga since 2015 (TV series), but she developed special feelings for Kaga, perhaps because they had shared a difficult time together since 2020, and Kaga accepted her feelings at the final race of the 2022 season.
Makoto Katagiri (片桐 誠, Katagiri Makoto)
Voiced by: Nobutoshi Canna
After the appearance of the new Aoi Formula team, he became the chief mechanic in charge of Shinjō, and after the departure of Shinjō, he became the mechanic in charge of Kaga.
Kyōshirō Nagumo (名雲 京志郎, Nagumo Kyōshirō)
Voiced by: Shūichi Ikeda
The replacement of Kyōko Aoi as president in 2020. Born November 8, 1994, blood type O, he is a key player in SAGA and SIN. His hobby is listening to music (classical).
In SAGA, he is the mastermind behind the Al-Zard Incident and puts Aoi in a tight spot. In SIN, he provides Kaga with the Ogre to save Aoi, which was sure to withdraw from CF if it did not win the championship.
His family owned an auto parts company, but it was taken over by Aoi, and his father committed suicide because of it. His own brother, Masashi Nagumo, used to be involved in the development of the Asurada, but after parting company with Hiroyuki Kazami due to a conflict of alignments, he committed suicide out of remorse for not only not having a driver who could drive the Ogre, which he had continued to develop independently, but also for causing his death. Because of his origins, Kyōko suspects that his motive for the Al-Zard Incident was revenge against Aoi, but he denies it and expresses his dislike for his own father and brother. On the other hand, he also explains the superiority of Al-Zard to Hayato, and when he wins the championship, he mumbles "big brother" without being noticed, and after all is said and done, he thanks Kaga.
In the initial drafts of the characters in SAGA, the designs of Nagumo and Fritz were reversed, but the designs were switched based on the character impressions of both of them.
Sōichirō Aoi (葵 走一郎, Aoi Sōichirō)
Voiced by: Kenichi Sakaguchi
The president of Aoi Automobile Industry. He is also a former CF driver and was ranked 6th in the 2nd (2007) championship. Since 2013, he has left team management to his only daughter, Kyōko, and oversees the entire Aoi Group from a higher position.
In 2020, due to the team's poor performance, Kyōko was demoted to vice president of Aoi ZIP Formula, and Nagumo was brought in as the new president. After the new organization took over, the team was satisfied with its string of wins, but Aoi was later ousted from his position as president due to the Al-Zard Incident that Nagumo caused.

=== Union Savior ===
George Grayson (ジョージ・グレイスン, Jōji Gureison)
Voiced by: Motomu Kiyokawa
Butler of the Randall family. He has a weakness for dogs.
At the end of 2016, he gave Randall a loud pep talk when Randall was thrown into a slump. When Randall made a spot appearance in 2018 as Prince Rosenkreuz, he appeared on the circuit as "Bishop," a mysterious butler in a black cape.

=== Stormzender (Strozek Project) ===
Lisa Heinel (リサ・ハイネル, Risa Haineru)
Voiced by: Akemi Okamura (CD dramas and video games only)
The younger sister of Franz Heinel, she is friendly and cheerful, unlike her brother, and has been on Strozek's staff since 2017, accompanying her brother and Guderian.

=== Missing Link ===
Smith (スミス, Sumisu)
Voiced by: Masato Hirano
Codenamed "Condor," he is the one who took the life of Hayato's father, with the goal of stealing Asurada's cyber system. He tried to kill Schumacher and Bootsvorz with a helicopter in Canada, but Bootsvorz fought back and Smith was killed in a crash.

=== FICCY ===
Rena Yūki (結城 レナ, Yūki Rena)
Voiced by: Ayako Kawasumi (Road to the Evolution and Road to the Infinity 2–3 only)
A childhood friend of Seiichirō Shiba, the main character of Future GPX Cyber Formula: A New Challenger. She is a high school girl who was chosen as a grid girl for the "Extreme Speed" race held after the 2020 World Championship (New Challenger).
She is the origin of Rena Yūki / Rena Sayers, a character in the My-HiME project created by Hirokazu Hisayuki, who also designed the characters for SAGA.

== Other characters ==
Hiroyuki Kazami (風見 広之, Kazami Hiroyuki)
Voiced by: Tatsuyuki Jinnai, Yasunori Matsumoto (17 years old) (Japanese); Paul Pistore (English)
Hayato's father and the developer of Asurada. He died after defending Asurada from the hands of Smith, who was after Asurada at the cost of his own life. He was born on August 28, 1968, and his blood type is A.
Junko Kazami (風見 純子, Kazami Junko)
Voiced by: Ai Satō
Hayato's mother, a world-renowned violinist. After losing her husband, she went into hiding to escape Smith's pursuit. Born October 4, 1971; blood type A.
Checker Sugimoto (チェッカー杉本, Chekkā Sugimoto)
Voiced by: Kōzō Shioya
From 2014 to 2018, he was in charge of the play-by-play for the CF broadcasts (footage of the previous year's broadcasts appeared in the TV series, and he was also in charge of the play-by-play in those broadcasts).
Jun Nakazawa (中沢 純, Nakazawa Jun)
Voiced by: Motomu Kiyokawa
He has been providing commentary for CF since Round 4 in 2016. Former Union mechanic.
He is modeled after Tetsuo Tsugawa, who worked as an F1 mechanic before becoming a commentator for F1 broadcasts, and Jun Imamiya, who was the absolute best F1 commentator at the time of production.
Dave Lombard (デイブ・ロンバート, Deibu Ronbādo)
Voiced by: Kiyomitsu Mizuuchi
The play-by-play announcer for CF coverage from 2019 onwards; he is the second CF play-by-play announcer.
Ninzaburō Furusato (古里 任三郎, Furusato Ninzaburō)
Voiced by: Kazumi Tanaka
An inspector in charge of the Al-Zard Incident in 2020. When he visited Aoi's pit during the race, he accepted Kaga's statement that the race was not over and that he wanted to settle it by driving through it, and waited until the end of the race to seize Al-Zard and arrest Nagumo.
He is modeled after producer of the SAGA series Naotake Furusato.
Aya Stanford (彩・スタンフォード, Aya Sutanfōdo)
Voiced by: Aya Hisakawa
A Cyber Formula photographer who has a crush on Kaga. Born September 26, 1998; blood type O.
Gray Stanbeck (グレイ・スタンベック, Gurei Sutanbekku)
Voiced by: Takeshi Watabe
Team(s): Aoi ZIP Formula manager (2022 only)
A mechanic who knows Kaga and is the new manager of Aoi. His real name is Gregory Stanbeck.
