= Kozue Yoshizumi =

Japanese voice actress

Kozue Yoshizumi (吉住 梢, Yoshizumi Kozue; born September 7, 1979) is a Japanese voice actress from Tokyo, Japan. She voices Mayu Tamano for the Rumbling Hearts visual novel and anime series as well as the web anime Ayumayu Gekijou. When voicing adult anime/games she has used a number of aliases, including "Kyouko Yoshida" (吉田 恭子, Yoshida Kyouko) and "Yui Katase" (片瀬唯, Katase Yui).

== Filmography ==
=== Anime ===
- Boogiepop Phantom (Rie Takai)
- Cyber Team in Akihabara (Suzume Sakurajosui)
- Eden's Bowy (Sakura)
- Futakoi (Ui Chigusa)
- Futakoi Alternative (Ui Chigusa)
- Geneshaft (Natasha)
- Hanaukyo Maid Team La Verite (Lemon)
- Himesama Goyōjin (Aoi Misuzu)
- Kaikan Phase (Yuko)
- Kamichama Karin (Himeka Karasuma)
- Rumbling Hearts (credited as Kyouko Yoshida; Mayu Tamano)
- Magic User's Club (Naomi)
- Ouran High School Host Club (Renge Houshakuji)
- Raimuiro Ryukitan X (Aya Nabeshima)

=== OVA ===
- Akane Maniax (Mayu Tamano)
- Magic User's Club (Naomi)
- Mizuiro (Mutsuki Shindo)
- Photon (Koro-chan)
- Denpa teki na Kanojo (Hikaru Ochibana)

=== Film ===
- Cyber Team in Akihabara - 2011 Summer Vacation (Suzume Sakurajosui)

=== Drama CDs ===
- Ze (Benio)

=== Web ===
- Ayu Mayu Gekijou (Mayu Tamano)

=== Video games ===
- Eiyuu Shigan (Kozue)
- Futakoi (Ui Chigusa)
- Glint Glitters (Miki & Tama)
- I/O (Masami Shinozuka, Mayumi Shinozuka)
- Kazoku Keikaku (Matsuri Kawahara)
- Little Lovers (Kazue Ikeda)
- Love & Destroy (Kiki)
- Mizuiro (Mutsuki Shindo)
- Muv-Luv Alternative (Yuuhi Koubuin & Yuuhi Mitsurugi)
- Star Ocean: Till the End of Time (Clair Lasbard)
- Tokyo Majin Gakuen Kenpucho (Sayo Hirasaka)
- Vampire Savior (Emily)
