= List of Muv-Luv books =

Three manga adaptations based on Muv-Luv and its sequel Muv-Luv Alternative have been serialized in MediaWorks's, and later ASCII Media Works's Dengeki Daioh manga magazine. The first adaptation, called Muv-Luv, was written and illustrated by Ukyō Takao and covers the Extra part of the first game. It was collected and republished in three volumes by MediaWorks. The second series is Muv-Luv Unlimited and covers the Unlimited portion of the first game. It ran for four volumes and was written and illustrated by Tomo Hiryokawa. The third series, Muv-Luv Alternative, was written and illustrated by Azusa Maxima and based on the second game of the same name. It began its serial run in the February 2007 issue of Dengeki Daioh. Seventeen compilation volumes have been published by ASCII Media Works.

The novel series Muv-Luv Alternative: Total Eclipse has also been adapted into a manga by Takashi Ishigaki and three compilation volumes have been published. Another novel series, Schwarzesmarken, detailing the events in East Germany during the BETA invasion in 1983, serialized in the magazine Tech Gian, replacing Total Eclipse. Seven volumes of Schwarzesmarken have been released, in addition to the light novel series Schwarzesmarken Requiem, of which two volumes have been released, and both series feature art by Carnelian.

== Manga ==
No.	Release date	ISBN	Muv-Luv
01	May 27, 2003	978-4-8402-2924-1	
02	July 27, 2004	978-4-8402-2649-3	
03	December 17, 2004	978-4-8402-2334-8	
Muv-Luv Unlimited
01	April 27, 2005	978-4-8402-3053-7	
02	February 27, 2006	978-4-8402-3369-9	
03	February 27, 2007	978-4-8402-3790-1	
04	March 27, 2007	978-4-8402-3832-8	
Muv-Luv Alternative
01	April 26, 2008	978-4-04-867049-4	
02	November 27, 2008	978-4-04-867442-3	
03	June 27, 2009	978-4-04-867866-7	
04	January 27, 2010	978-4-04-868369-2	
05	August 27, 2010	978-4-04-868896-3	
06	April 4, 2011	978-4-04-870406-9	
07	October 27, 2011	978-4-04-870982-8	
08	April 4, 2012	978-4-04-886569-2	
09	November 27, 2012	978-4-04-891190-0	
10	August 27, 2013	978-4-04-891846-6	
11	February 27, 2014	978-4-04-866295-6	
12	August 27, 2014	978-4-04-866844-6	
13	February 27, 2015	978-4-04-869210-6	
14	August 27, 2015	978-4-04-865298-8	
15	February 27, 2016	978-4-04-865716-7	
16	October 27, 2016	978-4-04-892368-2	
17	June 27, 2017	978-4-04-892967-7	
Muv-Luv Alternative: Total Eclipse
01	May 27, 2010	978-4-04-868623-5	
02	February 26, 2011	978-4-04-870327-7	
03	November 26, 2011	978-4-04-886095-6	
Muv-Luv Alternative: Total Eclipse Rising
01	November 27, 2012	978-4-04-891189-4	
02	July 27, 2013	978-4-04-891769-8	
03	March 27, 2014	978-4-04-866439-4	
04	December 20, 2014	978-4-04-869056-0	
05	September 26, 2015	978-4-04-865355-8	
06	July 27, 2016	978-4-04-892101-5	
Muv-Luv Alternative: Moonlight Over the Dark Night
01	July 27, 2013	978-4-04-891772-8	
Muv-Luv Alternative: Total Eclipse Imperial City
01	May 27, 2013	978-4-04-891687-5	

== Novels ==
No.	Title	Release date	ISBN
01	Muv-Luv 1: Extra: Unmei (マブラヴ 1 EXTRA 運命)	October 25, 2006	978-4-08-630323-1
02	Muv-Luv 2: Extra: Yūjō (マブラヴ 2 EXTRA 友情)	February 23, 2007	978-4-08-630344-6
03	Muv-Luv 3: Unlimited: Sensō (マブラヴ 3 UNLIMITED 戦争)	July 25, 2007	978-4-08-630371-2
04	Muv-Luv 4: Unlimited: Haiboku (マブラヴ 4 UNLIMITED 敗北)	November 22, 2007	978-4-08-630390-3
05	Muv-Luv 5: Alternative: Saiki (マブラヴ 5 ALTERNATIVE 再起)	March 25, 2008	978-4-08-630414-6
06	Muv-Luv 6: Alternative: Ruten (マブラヴ 6 ALTERNATIVE 流転)	November 21, 2008	978-4-08-630458-0
07	Muv-Luv 7: Alternative: Kessen (マブラヴ 7 ALTERNATIVE 決戦)	June 25, 2009	978-4-08-630488-7

No.	Title	Release date	ISBN
01	Muv-Luv Alternative: Total Eclipse 1: Oborozuki no Eji (マブラヴ オルタネイティヴ トータル・イクリプス 1 朧-の衛士)	December 25, 2007	978-4-7577-3920-8
02	Muv-Luv Alternative: Total Eclipse 2: Shukumei no Dōrin (マブラヴ オルタネイティヴ トータル・イクリプス 2 宿命の動輪)	May 30, 2008	978-4-7577-4234-5
03	Muv-Luv Alternative: Total Eclipse 3: Uromou no Orisei (マブラヴ オルタネイティヴ トータル・イクリプス 3 虚耗の檻穽)	December 26, 2008	978-4-7577-4521-6
04	Muv-Luv Alternative: Total Eclipse 4: Zangou no Senya (マブラヴ オルタネイティヴ トータル・イクリプス 4 懺業の戦野)	January 30, 2009	978-4-7577-4650-3
05	Muv-Luv Alternative Total Eclipse 5: Koshu no Sasabe (マブラヴ オルタネイティヴ トータル・イクリプス 5 吉宗鋼紀)	October 29, 2011	978-4-04-727615-4
06	Muv-Luv Alternative: Total Eclipse 6: Yocho no Hokage (マブラヴ オルタネイティヴ トータル・イクリプス 6 膺懲の火影)	March 30, 2013	978-4-04-728800-3

No.	Title	Release date	ISBN
01	Schwarzesmarken Volume 1 (シュヴァルツェスマーケン 1 神亡き屍戚の大地に)	May 30, 2011	978-4-04-727306-1
02	Schwarzesmarken Volume 2 (シュヴァルツェスマーケン 2 無垢なる願いの果てに)	September 30, 2011	978-4-04-727528-7
03	Schwarzesmarken Volume 3 (シュヴァルツェスマーケン 3 縹渺たる煉獄の彼方に)	March 30, 2012	978-4-04-727932-2
04	Schwarzesmarken Volume 4 (シュヴァルツェスマーケン 4 許されざる契りのために)	October 29, 2012	978-4-04-728419-7
05	Schwarzesmarken Volume 5 (シュヴァルツェスマーケン 5 紅蓮なる弔鐘の中で)	March 30, 2013	978-4-04-728802-7
06	Schwarzesmarken Volume 6 (シュヴァルツェスマーケン 6 儼たる相剋の嚮後に)	November 30, 2013	978-4-04-729297-0
07	Schwarzesmarken Volume 7 (シュヴァルツェスマーケン 7 克肖導く熾天の大地へ)	March 29, 2014	978-4-04-729528-5

No.	Title	Release date	ISBN
01	Schwarzesmarken Requiem Volume 1 (シュヴァルツェスマーケン Requiem -祈り- #1)	July 30, 2012	978-4-04-728214-8
02	Schwarzesmarken Requiem Volume 2 (シュヴァルツェスマーケン Requiem -願い- #2)	July 29, 2013	978-4-04-729014-3

No.	Title	Release date	ISBN
01	Schwarzesmarken Bernhard in the Shadow Volume 1 (シュヴァルツェスマーケン 隻影のベルンハルト1)	September 30, 2015	978-4-04-730693-6
02	Schwarzesmarken Bernhard in the Shadow Volume 2 (シュヴァルツェスマーケン 隻影のベルンハルト2)	January 1, 2016	978-4-04-734014-5
