= Schwarzes Marken =

Japanese video game and its adaptations

Schwarzesmarken
- Genres: Mecha
- Novel series
- Published by: Enterbrain
- Magazine: Tech Gian
- Original run: May 30, 2011 – March 29, 2014
- Volumes: 7
- Novel series

Schwarzesmarken Requiem
- Original run: July 30, 2012 – July 29, 2013
- Volumes: 2
- Novel series

Schwarzesmarken Bernhard in the Shadow
- Original run: September 30, 2015 – January 1, 2016
- Volumes: 2
- Video game
- Developer: âge
- Publisher: âge
- Genre: Visual novel
- Platform: Microsoft Windows
- Released: JP: November 17, 2015 (Note: Schwarzesmarken - Kouketsu no Monshou); JP: October 28, 2016 (Note: Schwarzesmarken - Junkyoushatachi)
- Anime television series
- Directed by: Tetsuya Watanabe
- Written by: Tatsuto Higuchi
- Music by: Evan Call (Elements Garden)
- Studio: ixtl Liden Films
- Licensed by: Crunchyroll
- Original network: TV Tokyo, TVO, TVA, AT-X
- Original run: January 10, 2016 – March 27, 2016
- Episodes: 12

Schwarzesmarken (Note: Japanese: シュヴァルツェスマーケン, Hepburn: Shuvarutsesumāken; nonstandard German for "Black Marches", the correct version of which would be "Schwarze Marken".) is a Japanese light novel created by Hiroki Uchida based on the "Muv-Luv" franchise.

== Plot ==
In 1983, the East German Army 666th TSF Squadron, “Schwarzes marken,” is a special-response force tasked with assaulting BETA forces. They target Laser and Heavy Laser class BETA to disable their enemy's firepower. This team's orders are given the highest priority, and they follow them so exactly that the 666th is known to ignore allied distress calls that would interfere with an ongoing mission, even if only for a moment. It is an unity with specials and unofficial missions.

It is a series set in the Germany of the Alternative Muv-Luv universe, during the early years of the BETA invasion in 1983. The protagonists are the 666th TSF squadron of East Germany, who fight both the BETA and opponents from the corrupt Stasi (Ministry of State Security).

== Characters ==
- Kenichi Suzumura : Theodor Eberbach
- Minami Tanaka : Katia Waldheim
- Nozomi Yamamoto : Irisdina Bernhard
- Yoshino Nanjō : Lise Hohenstein
- Kiyono Yasuno : Gretel Jeckeln
- Chika Anzai : Anett Hosenfeld
- Emiri Katō : Pham Thi-Rang
- Michiyo Murase : Sylvia Kschessinska
- Kenta Miyake : Walter Krüger
- Yukari Tamura : Beatrix Brehmer
- Ken Narita : Heinze Axmann
- Manami Numakura : Circe Steinhoff

== Media ==
=== Light novel ===
Schwarzesmarken replaced the Total Eclipse serialization in Tech Gian magazine. The series is written by Hiroki Uchida and features character designs and illustrations by CARNELIAN. The novel was compiled into seven volumes following a 41 chapter run from 2011 to 2014. The series was followed in Tech Gian by its prequel, Bernhard im Schatten.

A visual novel adaptation by âge was released in late 2015 for Microsoft Windows in two parts: Kouketsu no Monshou and Junkyoushatachi. Between the release of the two parts a Steam release and English localization of the visual novel was considered. However, despite this version of the game being approved via Steam Greenlight, it was ultimately not released.

=== Anime ===
On September 18, 2015, a teaser website announced that an anime television adaptation of the Schwarzesmarken novels by ixtl and Liden Films was scheduled to air in January 2016. The anime series began airing on January 10, 2016, on TV Tokyo, TV Osaka, TVQ Kyushu Broadcasting, TV Hokkaido, AT-X, TV Setouchi, TV Aichi and Nico Nico Douga in Japan. Outside of Japan, the series is available via streaming on Crunchyroll. In November 2017, Crunchyroll released dubs of the series in German, French, Spanish, and Portuguese. The first opening theme is "White Forces" by fripside, and the ending theme is "Kanashimi ga Jidai o Kakeru" (哀しみが時代を駆ける) by Zähre. The soundtrack is composed by Evan Call of Elements Garden.

=== Episodes ===
No.	Title (Note: The series was mainly available on Crunchyroll Latin America and France.)	Original release date
1	"#01"	January 10, 2016
An East German TSF squadron, the 666th or "Schwarzesmarken", enter the fight against the BETA with their Comrade Captain, Irisdina Bernhard. Pilot Anett Hosenfield suffers a nervous breakdown and, in the chaos it creates, pilot Inghild Bronikowski is mortally wounded. Irisdina administers a coup de grace rather than leave Inghild to die on the battlefield. She castigates Second Lieutenant Theodor Eberbach for failing to help Annett, and assigns him to continue the mission while Inghild's body is recovered. Later in the battle, Theodor finds a fallen TSF whose unconscious pilot causes him to have a flashback to a failed defection to the West and the loss of his adoptive sister, Lise. The pilot turns out to be West German Second Lituenant Katia Waldheim, and when she awakes, she asks to defect to East Germany and join the 666th Squadron. Irisdina, in consultation with party commissar Gretel Jackelyn, allows it and puts Theodor in charge of Katia, hoping to correct his earlier failure to help Anett. Theodor warns Katia to not trust anyone, especially the Stasi, telling her that Irisdina sold out her own brother to the Stasi as a traitor to further her own military career.
2	"#02"	January 17, 2016
After finishing training for laserjagd, the squadron's technique for hunting Laser-class BETA, the Stasi arrive. They demand to take Katia to clarify some things because she is from the West and was admitted to the 666th with unusual haste. Heinz Axmann, of the Stasi, also states that the rumors about Irisdina are true, adds that she will someday kill her squadron, and tells Katia that they will see her soon. Meanwhile, Theodor researches General Strachwitz at Katia's request and finds that names of Srachwitz's allies, as well as Theodor's father, have been blacked out of old newspaper microfilm. When Theodor reports this Katia and advises her to stop searching, she reveals that she is Strachwitz's daughter, sent to West Germany five years ago in hopes of uniting both nations against the BETA. However, the base spots a BETA advance and they head out for battle. During the battle, the 666th receives orders to dispatch Katia and another pilot, Pham Thi Lan, to reinforce Fort Neuenhagen. The squad recognizes this as an obvious ploy by the government to solve their Katia problem by sending her into a battle she is not expected to survive.
3	"#03"	January 24, 2016
Katia and the injured Pham are brought inside the besieged Fort Neuenhagen. Back at Bebersee Base, Gretel asks Theodor if he and Irisdina are plotting something. She reveals that five years earlier, a coup against the Stasi led by General Strachwitz was foiled, and the Stasi effectively erased him from history. Gretel also tells Theodor the story of Irisdina selling out her brother to the Stasi is almost certainly a lie. Armed with this information, Theodor arranges a meeting with Irisdina in an old church, where she admits her "dog of the Stasi" persona is a cover, and she's plotting to overthrow the Stasi herself, and recruits Theodor into her cause. She tells Theodor that Katia is their last hope, and allows him to fly to Neuenhagen and rescue Katia. As the fort begins to fall to the BETA onslaught, Theodor crashes through the roof and rescues Katia and Pham. As Theodor's TSF flies away, holding Katia in its hand, she sees the base explode, its ammunition piles deliberately set off by a mortally wounded soldier left behind. After returning to Bebersee, Katia encounters a transferring pilot who introduces herself as Lise Hoenstein, the same name as Theodor's long-lost sister.
4	"#04"	January 31, 2016
Irisdina introduces Lise to the squadron, to the shock of Theodor, who cannot believe he's been reunited with his sister after being separated three years ago. Irisdina and Gretel express concern Lise may have been brainwashed, sent as a spy against the National People's Army and the 666th specifically. Irisdina orders Theodor to figure out what Lise is up to. During a training exercise, they meet up with European Union forces, and join an operation to retake BETA-held territory in the former Poland with the goal of expanding a beachhead near Gdańsk. During the battle, the 666th is deep into the BETA position when they realize the EU forces have fired artillery in their direction; Katia tells them Western forces would never expect TSFs to advance so far. Irisina orders a retreat, which Gretel countermands because of the political embarrassment of admitting the Western strategy is superior. With bombardment underway, a West German TSF squadron provides cover for the 666th's escape, firing cruise missiles to finish the battle decisively, to Gretel's humiliation.
5	"#05"	February 7, 2016
In the recaptured Gdańsk base, West German Huckebein battalion leader Circe Steinhoff berates the Schwarzesmarken for needing to be rescued. She gets into a fistfight with Annett, which is broken up by Katia. Irisdina reveals to Theodor and Katia that the whole reason for the joint mission is to improve the military's stature relative to the Stasi, which explains Gretel's obsession with appearances. Facing a second wave of 40,000 BETA, the Warsaw Pact forces plan a response that will put the 666th in the greatest danger, but will also prove their mettle compared to the EU and US' conservative tactics. Prior to the mission, Lise asks Theodor if he plans to oppose the Stasi, which he denies. As the battle begins, the West's area-suppression tactics appear to succeed, until Circe's group encounters a second BETA echelon. Gretel takes command of the 666th and leads a laserjagd to eliminate the Laser-class BETA, which will allow for decisive bombardment of the main BETA horde. The 666th leads a group of American TSFs into battle with the Laser-class, but are surprised to find them protected by the enormous Fort-class BETA. The 666th defeat the Fort-class, but their TSFs are badly damaged and are ferried to safety after the battle by the grateful Huckebein pilots. Later, while the joint forces enjoy their victory, elsewhere Beatrix and a man she addresses as "Director Schmidt" execute Marai, assistant to the disappeared Major Hannibal and the last person left to protect the 666th from the Stasi.
6	"#06"	February 14, 2016
Back at base, Gretel and Irisdina grill Theodor about Lise's loyalties, and he asserts that she's loyal to him and not a Stasi plant. They also reveal that with the activation of a BETA hive in Minsk, East Germany will soon be overwhelmed with a new BETA assault. Along with all of this, the Stasi is on the verge of taking over the military, having arrested many NPA officials. Axmann arrives with a TSF squadron, briefly arresting Irisdina for "counterrevolutionary statements" during the earlier battle, and accusing Lise of being a Stasi spy. Later, Gretel reveals she's learned of a schism within the Stasi, between a "Moscow faction" loyal to the Soviet KGB and led by Beatrix and Major General Erich Schmidt, versus Axmann's "Berlin faction". Gretel and Theodor travel to Berlin to find anti-Stasi allies, where they are picked up by Major General Franz Heim, who is also leading an anti-Stasi faction. Heim warns them that the Stasi will use the immenent BETA attack as cover to launch a coup d'état. At Bebersee, Lise looks in Katia's locket, finding a picture of her father, and accuses her of plotting something in league with Theodor and Irisdina. Lise catches Theodor talking with Irisdina and begs him to believe she is loyal to him. Later, Lise lures Theodor to her quarters, where she seduces him.
7	"#07"	February 21, 2016
The BETA assault from Minsk is worse than expected, with 200,000 BETA headed towards Fort Seelow, where the army will make its final stand to protect Berlin. With doubts about Lise growing in the squad, Theodor asserts her innocence to Irisdina, and acknowledges he has begun a sexual relationship with Lise, his adoptive sister, in order to keep an eye on her. The BETA overwhelm artillery forces with the Heavy Laser-class, and the 666th is sent to engage them. In Berlin, Axmann sends his TSF squad to take over Parliament. On the battlefield, the 666th struggle with the Heavy Lasers and eventually gain the upper hand, but Irisdina is severely wounded. With news that the Stasi coup is underway, Lise begs Theodor to run away with her, but he refuses, pledging his loyalty to Irisdina. The 666th launch on a sortie to stop a second wave of Heavy Lasers, dangerously spearheading an attack from long-range missiles immediately behind them. Returning from the successful mission, the 666th is ambushed by Stasi loyalists. Theodor and Katia take refuge in his TSF cockpit, while Lise, finally revealing her Stasi affiliation, holds Irisdina hostage at gunpoint and demands they come out.
8	"#08"	February 28, 2016
Theodor and Katia escape the base, leaving the rest of the squad captured by Lise. In Berlin, where the Moscow faction of the Stasi has beaten Axmann's Berlin faction, Schmidt takes control of the government, vowing to unite all military forces under the Stasi. Beatrix arrives at Bebersee, where she re-inducts Lise to the Stasi's Werewolf battalion, and orders Lise to interrogate the captured members of the 666th. Katia and the dejected Theodor escape into the woods, where they are rescued by Gretel, who is now working with a resistance organization. Gretel, Katia, and resistance leaders meet with General Heim, who is skeptical of their chances now that Irisdina, potentially a heroic symbol of resistance, is in Stasi hands. He reveals that the West is prepared to accept a Stasi-led government for the sake of expediency in the coming battle with the BETA. As he prepares to leave, Katia reveals her true identity to Heim: Usula Strachwitz, daughter of war hero Alfred Srachwitz.
9	"#09"	March 6, 2016
General Heim accepts Katia as a figurehead of the resistance and plans an attack on the Stasi in Berlin. At Bebersee Base, Lise oversees the interrogation of the captured members of the 666th. Theodor and Gretel lead the rebels in an attack on Bebersee to free the captured members. At the end of the battle, Lise appeals to Theodor to come with her, but he refuses. When she attempts to take him in by force Pham hits her TSF from behind with a rocket-propelled grenade. Lise returns fire from her cannon, killing Pham instantly. With a chance to kill Lise in retaliation, Theodor hesitates, and is forced to flee by the return of Werewolf squadron.
10	"#10"	March 13, 2016
The West German government takes note of the Stasi coup d'etat and is prepared to recognize them as the new government, only so that the East will hold the line against the BETA. Circe heads to the east to rendezvous with the rebels, hoping to bring back some proof they can win. Lise, now embedded with Borkewald squadron, attacks the leaked location of a rebel leadership meeting in Neuruppin. They are met by the remnants of the 666th, and Theodor leads his sister into a trap, mortally wounding her. He tears open her cockpit and she pleads with him that the rebels are fools and are just using him and can't beat the Stasi, and that she can't understand why he's doing what he's doing and that all she wanted was to be with him. Apologizing for failing to protect her and letting her down, and thanking her for protecting him from the Stasi for all those years at the cost of her own suffering despite the fact that it should have been he who protected her instead as was his job to do as her older brother and as he had promised her he would, he then shoots the mortally wounded Lise in the head to make her death quick.
11	"#11"	March 20, 2016
Attempting to return to Berlin, the 666th and their resistance allies are met by Werewolf Squadron at the Havel River. Gretel is shot down, but is found by Axmann, who invites her to join his Berlin faction in the internal Stasi rivalry against the Moscow faction. As bait, he shows her the Stasi files. She refuses and calls in rebel troops to torch the secret facility, but is wounded by gunfire in the chaos. Another group of rebels sneaks Katia into Berlin. Elsewhere in the city, Beatrix reveals Schmidt to be a KGB agent from the Soviet Union, and he reveals his plan to nuke East Germany to make it a bulwark to protect the USSR from the BETA. He orders his guards to execute Beatrix, but they kill him instead.
12	"#12"	March 27, 2016
The rebels take over Berlin's broadcast tower and escort Katia inside. The 666th and the rebels engage Werewolf squadron over the streets of Berlin. During the battle, they hear Katia's speech, revealing herself to the nation as Usula Strachwitz, and appealing for the people to rise up against the Stasi. During the battle, Beatrix kills Sylwia and Walther. Axmann takes Irisdina from her holding cell in an automobile, but is trapped by street demonstrations, and walks her into a nearby forest instead. Still intending to win the power struggle within the Stasi, he indicates he has a new ally, which Irisdina realizes is the American CIA. As he prepares to shoot her, Anett finds them and throws Irisdina a pistol. She kills Axmann with a shot to the head, but is mortally wounded herself. In a TSF battle above the city, Theodor kills Beatrix. The BETA breach the city's final defenses, but the last-minute arrival of West German forces saves the day. Katia is greeted by the crowds as a hero, but Anett calls Theodor to aid the dying Irisdina. She asks to see the city one last time, and Theodor takes her in his TSF to see the sun rise over the city before she succumbs to her injuries. In an epilogue, the Berlin Wall is dismantled and reunification talks with West Germany begin. Katia becomes a politician and Theodor accompanies her by train to the West.

== See also ==
- List of anime releases made concurrently in the United States and Japan
