= Muv-Luv Girls Garden =

2025 video game

- Developers: EXNOA; KMS
- Series: Muv-Luv
- Platforms: Browser; PC; Android
- Release: 3 September 2025

Muv-Luv Girls Garden (Japanese: マブラヴ ガールズガーデン) is a 2025 idle RPG developed by EXNOA and KMS. It was launched on DMM GAMES on 3 September 2025, and is playable on their respective platforms. It is a part of the Muv-Luv franchise.

== Synopsis ==
The story takes place on the Zartum island, which hosts an mysterious gigantic space named the "Maze". In the prologue, the protagonist wakes up in the Maze, where he encounters a group of pilots riding on robots named Maze Guarder, abbreviated MG. The team, named Sirius Sugar works with the protagonist, nicknamed the commander through the story to first escape the space. After escaping, the commander becomes a part of the Zartum school, where pilots of MGs are trained. The pilots all belong to a team, each team working separately. The commander then encounters problems in the teams, such as the Sirius Sugar, and works together with the girls to solve the problems.

== Gameplay ==
The game's combat consists of a maximum of five pilots in their MGs, and enemies. Each encounter is automated, and the player cannot interfere with the battle once it starts. The pilots can be assigned to one of the six slots, which three are considered the front row and the other three are the back row. The pilots all have a set row where they perform as usual, and they will perform with a reduced stats if assigned a different row. In the main story part, several battles must be beaten in order to view the next story. In the story, the player is also given two different routes, with each route resulting in varying girls appearing as the main supporting character. Route selections cannot be reverted.

== Development ==
The concept of the game came from the first part of the visual novel Muv-Luv, titled Muv-Luv Extra. As scenarios based on schools was considered to be the starting point of the franchise by the producer of the franchise, the producer intended the game to be a bridge to the franchise to keep it going. KMS was picked for the developer by the producer of the game because "it was really good at crafting the characters' charms". The game, both the all-ages version and the rated-18 version was released on 3 September 2025.

== Reception ==
A reviewer from Famitsu positively rated the game character's appearances, noting fully automated nature of the combat as convenient. They also noticed several links to the standard Muv-Luv world settings. One of the reviewers who were able to access to pre-release version also noted refined settings of the Muv-Luv world, making the storyline easy for people new to the franchise to understand, while foreshadowing references to it. A reviewer from Dengeki Online left similar remarks about the storyline, while noting the absence of shocking scenes compared to Muv-Luv Alternative. They positively noted the game's graphics.
