= Minami Kuribayashi =

- 栗林 みな実
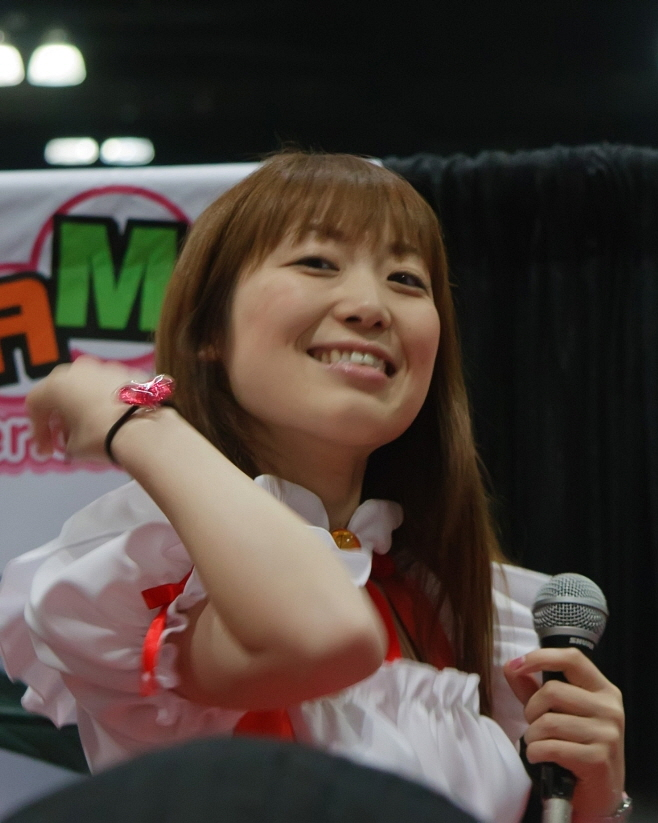
- Minami at Anime Expo 2010
- Born: Kumiko Murakami (村上 久美子); 11 June 1976 (age 50); Aoi-ku, Shizuoka, Japan
- Occupations: Singer; songwriter; lyricist; voice actress
- Musical career
- Genres: J-pop, Anison
- Instrument: Vocals
- Years active: 1997–present
- Labels: Lantis (2002–present); Avex Entertainment (2012–present)
- Formerly of: Wild 3nin Musume
- Website: kuribayashi-minami.jp

Minami Kuribayashi (栗林 みな実, Kuribayashi Minami; born June 11, 1976) is a Japanese singer, songwriter, lyricist and former voice actress from Shizuoka Prefecture. From 2016 to 2019, she performed under the stage name Minami.

Her involvement in the game and anime Kimi ga Nozomu Eien, where she voiced the role of one of the characters, Haruka Suzumiya and performed and penned the theme songs and other songs relating to the series, has brought her much attention. Her single "Precious Memories", used as the opening theme song for the series' animated version was a success; it had a peak ranking of 17th place on the Oricon charts and charted for 14 weeks. She has since performed songs for other games and anime, including series such as Muv-Luv, Chrono Crusade, My-HiME, My-Otome, Kure-nai, and School Days.

Kuribayashi has performed as part of the group Wild 3nin Musume, whose other present members are Joy Max (a.k.a. Joy Max Maximum) and Kisho Taniyama (a.k.a. Jackie Yang). She also once paired with Chiaki Takahashi to form the group exige, where Takahashi was known as CT. Veronica. Also, she is part of Sound Horizon.

== Filmography ==
=== TV animation ===
- Kimi ga Nozomu Eien (Haruka Suzumiya)
- Mai Otome (Erstin Ho)
- School Days (Minami Obuchi)

=== OVAs ===
- Akane Maniax (Haruka Suzumiya)
- Ayumayu Gekijou (Haruka Suzumiya, Kasumi Yashiro)
- Kimi ga Nozomu Eien ~Next Season~ (Haruka Suzumiya)
- My-Otome Zwei (Ribbon-chan)
- School Days ~Magical Heart Kokoro-chan~ (Minami Obuchi)

=== Internet animation ===
- Ayumayu Gekijou (Haruka Suzumiya, Kasumi Yashiro)

=== Games ===
- Age Maniax (Susie, Fumino)
- Kaseki no Uta (化石の歌) (Priere)
- Kimi ga Nozomu Eien (Haruka Suzumiya)
- School Days (Minami Obuchi)
- School Days L x H (Minami Obuchi)
- "Hello, world." (Haruka Tomonaga)
- Muv-Luv (Kasumi Yashiro)
- Muv-Luv Alternative (Kasumi Yashiro, Haruka Suzumiya)
- Muv-Luv Altered Fable (Kasumi Yashiro, Haruka Suzumiya)
- My-Otome: Otome Butoushi!! (Erstin Ho)

== Discography ==
=== Solo ===
==== Singles ====
#	Single details	Catalog No.	Peak Oricon chart position	Album	Sales	Notes
1st	"Muv-Luv (マブラヴ)": Released: 3 April 2002; Label: Lantis; Format: CD	LACM-4048	97	Overture	25,900	(Game Muv-Luv opening theme)
2nd	"Kaze no Yukue/Yours (風のゆくえ/yours)": Released: 5 February 2003; Label: Lantis; Format: CD	LACM-4084	62	Overture	28,600	(Game Kimi ga Nozomu Eien theme song)
3rd	"Precious Memories": Released: 29 October 2003; Label: Lantis; Format: CD	LACM-4107	17	Overture	55,000	(Kimi ga Nozomu Eien opening theme)
4th	"Tsubasa wa Pleasure Line (翼はPleasure Line)": Released: 21 January 2004; Label: Lantis; Format: CD	LACM-4110	17	passage	51,500	(Chrono Crusade opening theme)
5th	"Shining☆Days": Released: 3 November 2004; Label: Lantis; Format: CD	LACM-4157	18	passage	52,000	(My-HiME opening theme)
–	"beginning": Released: 23 February 2005; Label: Lantis; Format: CD	LACM-4183	55	passage	33,600	(OVA Akane Maniax opening theme)
6th	"Shining☆Days Re-Product&Remix": Released: 24 March 2005; Label: Lantis; Format: CD	LACM-4189	39	Non–album single	5,000	
7th	"Muv-Luv (2005 version) (マブラヴ(再録音版))": Released: 10 August 2005; Label: Lantis; Format: CD	LACM-4209	34	passage	34,400	(Game Muv-Luv opening theme)
8th	"Blue Treasure": Released: 24 August 2005; Label: Lantis; Format: CD	LACM-4205	37	passage	35,100	(Tide-Line Blue opening theme)
9th	"Dream☆Wing": Released: 2 November 2005; Label: Lantis; Format: CD	LACM-4227	19	passage	42,300	(My-Otome 1st opening theme)
10th	"Crystal Energy": Released: 22 February 2006; Label: Lantis; Format: CD	LACM-4247	15	fantastic arrow	38,700	(My-Otome 2nd opening theme)
11th	"Yell!": Released: 22 November 2006; Label: Lantis; Format: CD	LACM-4320	20	dream link	19,400	(Super Robot Wars Original Generation: Divine Wars ending theme)
12th	"United Force": Released: 22 May 2007; Label: Lantis; Format: CD	LACM-4364	23	dream link	20,800	(Kishin Taisen Gigantic Formula opening theme)
13th	"BUT,metamorphosis": Released: 26 December 2007; Label: Lantis; Format: CD	LACM-4447	79	dream link	12,500	(Cutie Honey: The Live ending theme)
14th	"Next Season/Sweet Passion": Released: 12 March 2008; Label: Lantis; Format: CD	LACM-4476	39	dream link	15,100	(OVA Kimi ga Nozomu Eien ~Next Season~ opening theme)
15th	"Love Jump": Released: 23 April 2008; Label: Lantis; Format: CD	LACM-4480	36	dream link	16,800	(Kure-nai opening theme)
16th	"unripe hero": Released: 23 July 2008; Label: Lantis; Format: CD	LACM-4514	33	mind touch	7,761	(Blassreiter opening theme)
17th	"Finality Blue": Released: 22 October 2008; Label: Lantis; Format: CD	LACM-4549	48	mind touch	6,116	(My-Otome 0~S.ifr~ opening theme)
18th	"Sympathizer": Released: 21 January 2009; Label: Lantis; Format: CD	LACM-4563	22	mind touch	10,446	(Kurokami The Animation opening theme)
19th	"Miracle Fly": Released: 22 April 2009; Label: Lantis; Format: CD	LACM-4606	33	mind touch	7,539+	(Sora Kake Girl ending theme)
20th	"earth trip": Released: 22 July 2009; Label: Lantis; Format: CD	LACM-4639	87	mind touch		(Game Grandia Online opening theme)
21st	"Unreal Paradise (あんりある♡パラダイス)": Released: 21 October 2009; Label: Lantis; Format: CD	LACM-4657	30	mind touch		(Kämpfer opening theme)
22nd	"Meiya Kadenrou (冥夜花伝廊)": Released: 27 January 2010; Label: GloryHeaven; Format: CD	LACM-4047	43	Non–album single		(Katanagatari opening theme)
23rd	"STRAIGHT JET": Released: 26 January 2011; Label: Lantis; Format: CD	LACM-4777	16	TIGHT KNOT		(Infinite Stratos opening theme)
24th	"Kimi no Naka no Eiyū (君の中の英雄)": Released: 9 November 2011; Label: Lantis; Format: CD	LACM-34900 (Artist Side) LACM-4900 (Animation Side)	14	TIGHT KNOT		(Mobile Suit Gundam AGE ending theme)
25th	"HAPPY CRAZY BOX": Released: 25 April 2012; Label: Lantis; Format: CD	LACM-34925 (Limited Edition), LACM-4925 (Regular Edition)	25	TIGHT KNOT		(Medaka Box opening theme)
26th	"signs~Sakutsuki Hitoyo~ (signs 〜朔月一夜〜)": Released: 22 August 2012; Label: Avex; Format: CD	AVCD-49734/B (Total Eclipse Edition), AVCD-49735/B (Artist Edition), AVCD-49736 (Regular Edition)	20	TIGHT KNOT		(Muv-Luv Alternative: Total Eclipse ending theme)
27th	"BELIEVE": Released: 24 October 2012; Label: Lantis; Format: CD	LACM-34015 (Limited Edition), LACM-14015 (Regular Edition)	35	TIGHT KNOT		(Medaka Box Abnormal opening theme)
28th	"Doubt the World": Released: 28 November 2012; Label: Avex; Format: CD	AVCD-49971/B (Total Eclipse Edition), AVCD-49972/B (Artist Edition), AVCD-49973 (Regular Edition)	28	TBA		(Muv-Luv Alternative: Total Eclipse opening theme)
29th	"ZERO!!": Released: 24 April 2013; Label: Lantis; Format: CD	LACM-34083 (Limited Edition), LACM-14083 (Regular Edition)	30	TBA		(The Devil Is a Part-Timer! opening theme)
30th	"True Blue Traveler": Released: 6 November 2013; Label: Lantis; Format: CD	LALM-4001 (Limited Edition), LALM-4003 (Regular Edition)	18	TBA		(Infinite Stratos (Season 2) opening theme)
31st	"moving soul": Released: 30 July 2014; Label: Lantis; Format: CD	LACM-34246 (Limited Edition), LACM-14246 (Regular Edition)	31	TBA		(Fate/kaleid liner Prisma Illya 2wei! opening theme)

==== Albums ====
===== Studio albums =====
Year	Album details	Catalog No.	Peak Oricon chart position	Certifications
2004	Overture: Released: 1 December 2004; Label: Lantis; Format: CD	LACA-5324	22	
2006	passage: Released: 26 April 2006; Label: Lantis; Format: CD	LACA-5501	12	
2006	fantastic arrow: Released: 21 December 2006; Label: Lantis; Format: CD	LACA-5588	33	
2008	dream link: Released: 27 August 2008; Label: Lantis; Format: CD	LASA-5802	24	
2010	mind touch: Released: 21 April 2010; Label: Lantis; Format: CD	LASA-15021	32	
2011	miracle fruit: Released: 9 March 2011; Label: Lantis; Format: CD	LACA-15102	30	
2013	TIGHT KNOT: Released: 29 May 2013; Label: Lantis; Format: CD	LACA-15305	32	

===== Best albums =====
Year	Album details	Catalog No.	Peak Oricon chart position
2011	stories: Released: 3 August 2011; Label: Lantis; Format: CD	LACA-9215/6	12

=== DVDs ===
- Kuribayashi Minami in BASXI Secret Live "Birthday eve"
- 2003-11-27: Kuribayashi Minami Music Clip "Precious Memories"
- 2008-02-27: Kuribayashi Minami 1st Live Tour 2007 "Fantastic Arrow"
