= Rumbling Hearts =

Japanese adult visual novel and its franchise

- Kimi ga Nozomu Eien
- Original visual novel cover featuring Haruka Suzumiya (left) and Mitsuki Hayase (right)

君が望む永遠
- Genre: Romance
- Video game
- Developer: Âge (Windows)
- Publisher: Acid (Windows); Alchemist (Dreamcast); Princess Soft (PS2)
- Genre: Eroge, Visual novel
- Platform: Windows, Dreamcast, PlayStation 2
- Released: Windows: JP: August 3, 2001; WW: August 24, 2024; Dreamcast: JP: September 26, 2002
- Anime television series
- Directed by: Tetsuya Watanabe
- Produced by: Katsuharu Nagata; Yoshiyuki Itō
- Written by: Ken'ichi Kanemaki
- Music by: Ken'ichi Sudō; Yoshiki Minami; Ado Torai
- Studio: Studio Fantasia
- Licensed by: AUS: Madman Entertainment; NA: Funimation; UK: Revelation films
- Original network: Chiba TV, Kids Station, Mie TV, Sun TV, TV Kanagawa, TV Saitama
- Original run: October 5, 2003 – January 4, 2004
- Episodes: 14
- Original video animation

Kimi ga Nozomu Eien: Next Season
- Directed by: Hideki Takayama
- Produced by: Takayuki Nagatani; Kensuke Kido; Jūkō Ozawa
- Music by: Ken'ichi Sudō; Yoshiki Minami; Ado Torai
- Studio: Brain's Base
- Released: December 21, 2007 – December 19, 2008
- Runtime: 30 minutes (each)
- Episodes: 4
- icon

Kimi ga Nozomu Eien (君が望む永遠; lit. "The Eternity You Desire"), or Kiminozo for short, is a Japanese adult visual novel developed by Âge and released on August 3, 2001, for Windows. It was later ported to the Dreamcast and PlayStation 2. The gameplay in Kimi ga Nozomu Eien follows a branching plot line which offers pre-determined scenarios with courses of interaction, and focuses on the appeal of the eight female main characters by the player character.

The game was adapted into a 14-episode anime television series, which aired between October 2003 and January 2004. Funimation licensed and distributed the anime in North America under the title Rumbling Hearts. The series was also licensed for release by Revelation Films in the United Kingdom and Madman Entertainment in Australia and New Zealand, under the title Rumbling Hearts: Kiminozo. It was one of the first anime shows to be officially made available for the iPod through the iTunes Store and is also available through Microsoft's Xbox Live Marketplace. A four-episode OVA series called Kimi ga Nozomu Eien: Next Season was released between December 2007 and December 2008. The OVA series follows an alternate ending that centers around Haruka.

== Gameplay ==
Screenshot of the gameplay. The player is presented with two options, and their choice can affect the direction of the plot.

Kimi ga Nozomu Eien is a romance visual novel in which the player assumes the role of Takayuki Narumi. Its gameplay requires little player interaction as much of the game's duration is spent on reading the text that appears on the screen, which represents the story's narrative and dialogue. The text is accompanied by character sprites, which represent who Takayuki is talking to, over background art. Throughout the game, the player encounters CG artwork at certain points in the story, which take the place of the background art and character sprites. When the game is completed at least once, a gallery of the viewed CGs becomes available on the game's title screen. Kimi ga Nozomu Eien follows a branching plot line with multiple endings, and depending on the decisions that the player makes during the game, the plot will progress in a specific direction.

There are eight main plot lines that the player will have the chance to experience, one for each heroine. Every so often, the player will come to a point where he or she is given the chance to choose from multiple options. Text progression pauses at these points until a choice is made. To view all plot lines in their entirety, the player will have to replay the game multiple times and choose different choices to further the plot to an alternate direction. The game is divided into two chapters, with the first one revolving around the events leading up to August 20 and the second chapter set three years later. It is in the second chapter that the game allows the player to choose to pursue one of the eight heroines and also has endings if the player chooses to pursue more than one of the girls at the same time. The updated version for Windows Vista, Kimi ga Nozomu Eien: Latest Edition, contains a third chapter. The original Windows edition has 14 endings, and the DVD version for Windows has two additional bad endings. In the adult versions of the game, there are scenes with sexual CGs depicting Takayuki and a given heroine having sex. Later, the consumer port versions were released without the adult content.

== Plot ==
Kimi ga Nozomu Eien's story revolves around the main protagonist Takayuki Narumi, a male high school student. The first chapter, which takes place between July 6 and August 20, 1998, serves as a prologue to the second chapter. Takayuki is set up with Haruka Suzumiya by their friends Mitsuki Hayase and Shinji Taira. Takayuki ends up in bed with a nude sprawled out Haruka, but their relationship is not consummated due to performance anxiety. Mitsuki stops Takayuki on her birthday and has him buy her a ring, which results in him being late for his date with Haruka. At the end of the chapter, caused by Takayuki not being able to arrive in time, Haruka ends up in a coma because of an accident. In chapter two, during the three years since the accident, Mitsuki has been taking care of Takayuki and they have formed a relationship. Takayuki has also taken a part-time job at the Daikuuji (Sky Temple) family restaurant. Haruka's sister contacts Takayuki to tell him that Haruka has come out of her coma and is asking to see him.

== Characters ==
Takayuki Narumi (鳴海 孝之, Narumi Takayuki)
Voiced by: Kishō Taniyama (Japanese); Kevin M. Connolly (English)
As the protagonist, Takayuki Narumi meets Haruka a year before Mitsuki sets them up during their third year of high school. When he witnesses the still fresh pool of blood next to Haruka's bloodied hair ribbons lying among the shattered glass of the phone booth, Later in the story, he works at a restaurant chain owned by the Sky Temple financial group called "The Family Restaurant", after having regressed in his studies resulting from the accident. In Haruka's absence, he gradually begins to develop a relationship with Mitsuki. In the game the player assumes this role and can choose to pursue and end up with most of the female characters.

Haruka Suzumiya (涼宮 遙, Suzumiya Haruka)
Voiced by: Minami Kuribayashi (Japanese); Carrie Savage (English)
Being a shy, timid girl, Haruka is set up with Takayuki by her friend, Mitsuki, while she is in high school. The two quickly become close, and develop an intimate relationship. She is involved in a serious accident and ends up in a coma. The main thrust of the story begins when she awakens three years later. She is afflicted with anterograde amnesia, and because of her delicate psyche, her family and Takayuki conceal the truth that three years have passed, which forms much of the tension in the series.

Mitsuki Hayase (速瀬 水月, Hayase Mitsuki)
Voiced by: Tomoko Ishibashi (Japanese); Colleen Clinkenbeard (English)
Mitsuki is friends with both Takayuki and Haruka, but secretly she has feelings for Takayuki. In high school she was a competitive swimmer, but shortly after Haruka's accident, she finds herself leaving swimming to tend to Takayuki. She finally reveals her feelings to Takayuki.

Akane Suzumiya (涼宮 茜, Suzumiya Akane)
Voiced by: Tomomi Uehara (Japanese); Leah Clark (English)
Haruka's younger sister initially treats both Takayuki and Mitsuki as older siblings until she finds out they have been seeing each other behind the comatose Haruka's back. While Haruka is in hospital, she visits her every day. She, like Mitsuki, is a competitive swimmer, but feels as if she can never match Mitsuki, who she initially looks up to. Later, there are hints given that Akane feels something more for Takayuki, but these are not explored fully in the anime television series.

Shinji Taira (平 慎二, Taira Shinji)
Voiced by: Makoto Aoki (Japanese); David Wilson-Brown (English)
Although being friends with Takayuki, Haruka and Mitsuki in high school, he drifts off from the group after graduation. However, he becomes an important character towards the end of the series. He sometimes presents a counter-balance to the drama of the rest of the characters, as his relationship with his girlfriend (who remains off-screen) seems to be going well.

Ayu Daikuuji (大空寺 あゆ, Daikūji Ayu)
Mayu Tamano (玉野 まゆ, Tamano Mayu)
Voiced by: Kiyomi Asai (Japanese); Luci Christian (English) (Ayu)
Voiced by: Kyōko Yoshida (Japanese); Monica Rial (English) (Mayu)
They are two waitresses who work at the same restaurant as Takayuki. Ayu is the surly daughter of the chief executive officer of the "Sky Temple" financial group, who owns and operates the restaurant chain. As such, she is permitted to work at the restaurant as part of a market study by the financial group on the condition she does not reveal her identity. She works in order to experience society. Mayu is a soft-spoken but well-meaning klutz who has lost her parents and older brother. While serving as love interests in the game, they provide the only comic relief in the anime. After the credits of several episodes in the anime television series, a 30-second short known as the "Ayu-Mayu Theater" shows them in a comical situation totally irrelevant to the main story with all characters super deformed.

Hotaru Amakawa (天川 蛍, Amakawa Hotaru)
Fumio Hoshino (星乃 文緒, Hoshino Fumio; Fumie in the Funimation English version)
Manami Homura (穂村 愛美, Homura Manami)
Voiced by: Satoko Kubota (Japanese); Alison Viktorin (English) (Hotaru)
Voiced by: Hitomi (credited as (Minami Hokuto) (Japanese); Jamie Marchi (English) (Fumio)
Voiced by: Amako Mari (Japanese); Amy Rosenthal (English) (Manami)
They are three nurses at the hospital. Hotaru and Fumio attended nursing school together and are very close friends. Hotaru Amakawa suffers from a terminal illness that stopped her physical development so that she looks like a very young girl. She is often referred to as "Fumio's child", as Hotaru has a very child like stature whereas Fumio has a very curvy and maternal stature. The two are inseparable. Manami, the green-haired nurse, is a student nurse who attended the same high school as Takayuki. Manami has a very strong mothering instinct with a desire to take care of people, hence her chosen profession. In the game, Manami is introduced in the first chapter and also is in love with Takayuki, but is also too shy to express her feelings for him. All three nurses are potential love interests in the game. The original Manami ending was so disturbing that fans wrote to the company calling to change it; DVD and PS2 versions of the game have a new ending for her route. In the anime, Manami's role is reduced to one line and several silent cameos. Hotaru is given several short scenes in the hospital, where she drops many sexual innuendos into her conversations with Takayuki.

Motoko Kōzuki (香月 モトコ, Kōzuki Motoko)
Voiced by: Mariko Kobayashi (Japanese); Stephanie Young (English)
She is the doctor in charge of Haruka. She is the elder sister of Mitsuko Kōzuki from Kimi ga Ita Kisetsu and Yūko Kōzuki from Muv-Luv.

== Development and release ==
Kimi ga Nozomu Eien is the fourth visual novel developed by Âge. The producer and head planner for Kimi ga Nozomu Eien was Hirohiko Yoshida, the executive director of Acid, the publishing company that Âge is under. The scenario was written by three people: Hayato Tashiro (under the name Kichikujin Tam), Ai Shibuya (under the name Maro Guts), and Hokuto Matsunaga (under the name Hanjūryoku Seimei Maa). Art direction and character design was done by Kai Sugihara (under the name Baka Ōji Persia). The music in the game was produced by Lantis and composed by Abito Watarai.

Kimi ga Nozomu Eien was released as an adult game on August 3, 2001, playable on Windows PC as a CD-ROM. It was re-released as a DVD on July 25, 2003, under the title Kimi ga Nozomu Eien: DVD Specification. The Kimi ga Nozomu Eien: Special FanDisk released on June 25, 2004 contains Kimi ga Nozomu Daiisshō (君が望む第一章; lit. 'The first chapter you desired'), a retelling of the first chapter of the game allowing for greater control over Takayuki's actions in the first chapter. The player is now allowed to prevent the accident or end up with someone else altogether. It also includes a collection of short stories featuring the game's various characters, a game version of True Lies from the Kimi ga Nozomu Eien Drama Theater vol. 4 Radio Special, the Kiminozo Radio Shucchōban (君のぞらじお出張版) radio special, a parody of Muv-Luv Extra featuring Kimi ga Nozomu Eien's characters called Muv-Nozo (マブノゾ), and a version of the puzzle game Marii no Okatazuke 2: Ayumayu Funtō-hen (マリーのおかたづけ2 あゆまゆ奮闘編)). A Vista-enhanced edition titled Kimi ga Nozomu Eien: Latest Edition was released on March 28, 2008. In addition to being built on an improved game engine and featuring improved graphics, the re-release also included the story content of the Special FanDisk and an all-new third chapter for selected heroines. An English version was released to crowdfunding backers on August 24, 2024, and on Steam on October 17.

The first consumer port of the game was released for the Dreamcast on September 26, 2002, by Alchemist. A PlayStation 2 port by Princess Soft was released on May 1, 2003, under the title Kimi ga Nozomu Eien: Rumbling Hearts.

== Adaptations ==
=== Print media ===
Two novels based on the visual novel, written by Mariko Shizimu, were published by Paradigm in February and April 2002. Three novels based on the anime adaptation, written by Kenji Nojima, were published by Media Factory between March and May 2004. An artbook for the visual novel titled Âge Official Kimi ga Nozomu Eien Memorial Art Book was published by MediaWorks on November 8, 2002. An artbook for the anime titled Kimi ga Nozomu Eien Visual Complete was published by Media Factory in April 2004. A picture book titled Mayauru no Okurimono (マヤウルのおくりもの, Mayauru's Gift), written by Ann Margaret Sawyer and illustrated by Teruyo Miyazaki, was published by Media Factory on March 25, 2004. A second picture book titled Hontō no Takaramono (ほんとうのたからもの, The Real Treasure), written and illustrated by Haruka Murakami, was published by Media Factory on September 25, 2004.

=== Radio shows ===
An original radio drama of Kimi ga Nozomu Eien aired on the radio program Chiyoren Channel (ちよれんちゃんねる♪) from July to December 2002 on Radio Osaka and NCB. Four CD compilation volumes of the radio drama titled "Kimi ga Nozomu Eien Drama Theater" (君が望む永遠 ドラマシアター, Kimi ga Nozomu Eien Drama Shiatā) were released between October 30, 2001, and December 22, 2002. A radio show titled Onsoku Hitomishiri Channel (音速♪ひとみしりちゃんねる) to promote the anime aired 13 episodes from July 2 to September 24, 2003, on Radio Osaka and TBS Radio. A radio show titled Kiminozo Radio (君のぞらじお) aired 78 episodes from October 4, 2003, to March 26, 2005, on Radio Osaka and TBS Radio. Kiminozo Radio became an Internet radio show on April 1, 2005, and broadcast until December 28, 2007, spanning 144 episodes. Additional Internet radio shows followed under the Kiminozo Radio name included: Kiminozo Radio: Next Season (君のぞらじお 〜Next Season〜), which aired 45 episodes between January 11, 2008, and January 5, 2009; Kiminozo Radio: Still I love you... (君のぞらじお Still I love you...), which aired 23 episodes between January 25 and June 27, 2008; and Kiminozo Radio: Silver Ring (君のぞらじお Silver ring), which aired 12 episodes between July 4 and September 26, 2008.

=== Anime ===
An anime television series based on the game which was animated and produced by Studio Fantasia first aired across Japan from October 5, 2003 to January 4, 2004. The plot consists of a blend of multiple storylines from the game, mostly the Mitsuki route with a bit of Haruka's route mixed with elements from the Akane route. The general fate of Amakawa is also disclosed through one scene between Fumio and Takayuki with a line by Fumio at the end of the final episode indicating she died. Manami is limited to one line at the very end and several dialogueless cameos. Materials not included in the game, due to its perspective being in first person, such as depictions of Mitsuki having sex with Shinji (in certain routes) and Haruka telling Mitsuki that she has a crush on Takayuki while walking home, are also included.

The anime was later licensed for American distribution by Funimation Entertainment under the title Rumbling Hearts: Kiminozo. It was originally released in three DVD volumes between December 2006 and March 2007, and was later re-released in a box set in August 2007. The writers for the English dub of the anime in the North American release received a mixed reception for taking a liberal approach while producing the script. This resulted in an interpretive script, which at several points reworks the dialogue. By contrast, the writers for the subtitle script in the North American release produced a script which is more faithful in its translation, going as far as including honorifics. In addition to the differences in dialogue, there is also a marked difference in the displayed level of affect between the Japanese and English voicework, though both were generally well received. For the most part, Takayuki's Japanese voice actor portrays him as severely emotionally numbed (dissociated), consistent with PTSD (one of the major themes). The English voice actor does not perform the role this way.

A four-episode original video animation (OVA) series, animated by Brain's Base and distributed by Bandai Visual, was released between December 21, 2007, and December 19, 2008, on DVD in regular and limited editions. The limited editions contained a bonus CD soundtrack with each DVD and a different cover artwork. The story of the OVAs follows Haruka's route, in contrast to the TV series' modified version of Mitsuki's route. Haruka Suzumiya awakens after a three-year coma. Time has deprived her of many important things, but one still remains: her love for Takayuki Narumi. They visit various places they remember, as if to recover the time that was lost. However, there is one place they refuse to visit: the phone booth in front of the Hiiragi-cho station, where Haruka had her accident three years ago.

A comedy ONA titled Ayumayu Gekijou that was broadcast from September to December 2006 on Kiminozo Radio's homepage with four episodes, and the remaining three episodes were included in the DVD, which was released in February 2007. The main characters are SD versions of Ayu and Mayu, and various other characters. Although it is technically a Kimi ga Nozomu Eien show, many characters and even a senjutsuki (type-00 Takemikazuchi, Meiya custom) from Muv-Luv show up. The series contains many references to Muv-Luv (for example, in the second episode, Ayu uses an S-11 SDS and Haruka is turned into a 00 Unit) and the fourth episode is more a parody of Muv-Luv Alternative. The series' main theme is "Koi no Bakudan de Ito" (恋の爆弾でいと; "Intended as a Love Bomb") by Uyamuya, while the song "Carry On" by Masaaki Endou is used as an insert song.

== Music ==
Kimi ga Nozomu Eien has two pieces of theme music: one opening theme and one ending theme. The opening theme is "Rumbling hearts" by Minami Kuribayashi and the ending theme is "Kimi ga Nozomu Eien" (君が望む永遠; "The Eternity You Desire") by Rino. Four cold open theme songs were added in subsequent releases of the game: "Yours" by Kuribayashi for the Dreamcast port, "Kaze no Yukue" (風のゆくえ; "The Direction of the Wind") by Kuribayashi for the PlayStation 2 port, "Blue tears" by Kuribayashi and Tomoko Ishibashi for Kimi ga Nozomu Eien: DVD Specification, and "Sweet Passion" by Kuribayashi for Kimi ga Nozomu Eien: Latest Edition. The ending theme "Omoide ni Kawaru made" (想い出に変わるまで; "Until It Becomes a Memory") by CooRie was added for chapter three in Latest Edition. Kimi ga Nozomu Eien: Special Fandisk features four ending themes for the first chapter: Haruka's theme is "Hitokoto dake no Yūki" (ひとことだけの勇気; "If Only I Had the Courage to Say Those Words") by Kuribayashi, Mitsuki's theme is "Silver Ring" by Ishibashi, Akane's theme is "Innocence" by Tomomi Uehara, and the theme for the normal ending is "Rumbling Hearts" by Kuribayashi.

The Rumbling Hearts anime television series has two main theme songs: the opening theme "Precious Memories", and the ending theme "Hoshizora no Waltz" (星空のワルツ; "Waltz of the Starry Sky"), which are both sung by Kuribayashi. Two additional songs by Kuribayashi were also used: "Kimi ga Nozomu Eien" as the ending theme of episode two, and "Nemuri Hime" (眠り姫; "Sleeping Princess") as an insert song. The ending theme for episode 14 is "Rumbling Hearts" by Rino. For Rumbling Hearts: Next Season, the opening theme is "Next Season" and the ending theme is "Eternity"; both songs are sung by Kuribayashi.

== Reception and legacy ==
Dreamcast Reviews

Review score
Publication	Score
Famitsu	7/10, 8/10, 8/10, 8/10

Four writers for Famitsu reviewed the Dreamcast version of the game. Two reviewers complimented on the presentation, with one saying how the character's expressions change even when they are speaking lines made the game more than just reading text and helped the story come to life. One reviewer said the unique style of the game and its plot twists would keep players engaged but cautioned that the game would not appeal to everyone.

The anime series was reviewed at Anime News Network, where reviewer Theron Martin commented that Rumbling Hearts "proves to be an involving and compelling look at how tragedy can impact matters of the heart." He also commented that the series' slow pacing, especially during the first two episodes, were a problem, comparing it to Saikano, although it worked better in later episodes. He also stated that the animation was not adequate, stating that "The character artistry looks good enough to support the story and offers a wide variety of physical appearances for its female characters, but often isn't fully integrated with the backgrounds and has a not-completely-refined quality about it in many scenes."

=== Appearances in other media ===
Mitsuki and Haruka as they appear in Muv-Luv Alternative

Characters from Kimi ga Nozomu Eien can be seen in other works by Âge. Akane is the main heroine in the Kimi ga Nozomu Eien spin-off and Muv-Luv prequel Akane Maniax. She also appears in Muv-Luv as a student in Hakuryou Hiiragi.

Several characters appear in the alternate world sequel to Muv-Luv, Muv-Luv Alternative.

Haruka, Mitsuki, and Akane are members of the special task force A-01, also known as the Isumi Valkyries, while Homura Manami is a nurse at the Yokohama base. Takayuki is also mentioned, but he was killed in action prior to the start of the game. In the epilogue, Haruka and Mitsuki can be seen walking around together near the station, Mitsuki with her pre-accident hairstyle. This suggests that the events of Kimi ga Nozomu Eien may be taken by future games to have never happened, allowing for Mitsuki and Haruka to show up as best friends in newer games as they did in Alternative.
