= Âge =

Japanese video game developer

âge
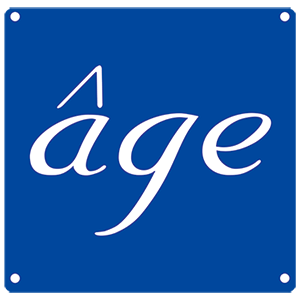
- Genre: Visual novels
- Founded: 1998; 28 years ago
- Products: Kimi ga Nozomu Eien; Muv Luv
- Parent: ACID Co.
- Divisions: âge, Mirage, Φâge
- Website: https://age-soft.co.jp

âge (アージュ, Āju) is a Japanese eroge brand attached to video games and visual novels owned by ACID Co.. They have also produced work under the names Mirage and Φâge.

âge was formerly known as Relic and developed video games for consoles. It gained fame following the release of its 2001 eroge visual novel Kimi ga Nozomu Eien. It was founded by Hirohiko Yoshida, Baka Prince Persia, Nanpuureima, Spin Drill, and Carnelian.

In 2011, Hirohito Yoshida created a rights management company for âge‘s content called "ixtl", subsequently a copyright transfer agreement was signed with ACID Co.

In 2017, Avex Pictures acquired ixtl, and later changed the company's name to aNCHOR

== List of developed games ==
=== âge ===
- Kimi ga Ita Kisetsu ~Primary~ (1997)
  Kimi ga Ita Kisetsu (2011 remake)
- Kaseki no Uta
- Âge Maniax
- Kimi ga Nozomu Eien (2001)
  - Kimi ga Nozomu Eien ~Special Fan Disc~ (2004)
- Muv-Luv (2003)
  Muv-Luv Supplement (Fandisc, 2004)
- Muv-Luv Alternative (2006)
  Muv-Luv Altered Fable (Fandisc, 2007)
- Muv-Luv Alternative - Total Eclipse (2013)
- Muv-Luv Alternative Chronicles 01 (2010)
  Muv-Luv Unlimited The Day After Episode 00
  Muv-Luv Alternative Chronicles Chicken Divers
  Muv-Luv Alternative Chronicles Rain Dancers
- Muv-Luv Alternative Chronicles 02 (2011)
  Muvluv Unlimited The Day After Episode 01
  Muv-Luv Alternative Chronicles Adoration
- Muv-Luv Alternative Chronicles 03 (2012)
  Muv-Luv Unlimited The Day After Episode 02
  Muv-Luv Alternative Chronicles Resurrection
- Muv-Luv Alternative Chronicles 04 (2013)
  Muv-Luv Unlimited The Day After Episode 03
  Muv-Luv Alternative Chronicles War Ensemble
  Muv-Luv Alternative Chronicles Last Divers
- Schwarzesmarken
  Schwarzesmarken: Kouketsu no Monshou (2015)
  Schwarzesmarken: Junkyousha-tachi (2016)

=== âge fan club titles ===
- Akane Maniax
- Critical Moment! Daikūji
- KimiNozo Duelist
- Âge FC Collection Bundle-ban Banban
- Ayu-Mayu Alternative
- Haruko Maniax

=== Mirage titles ===
- Soko ni Umi ga Atte
- Anonymous

=== Φâge titles ===
- Pikopiko: Koi Suru Kimochi no Nemuru Basho
- Owarinaki Natsu, Towa Naru Shirabe
- Shapeshifter

=== Third party titles ===
- Rasen Kairō (published by Rúf)
- Rasen Kairō 2 (published by Rúf)
- D: Sono Keshiki no Mukōgawa (published by PurePlatinum/Ocarina (K.T. Factory))
- School Days (sound production)
- Summer Days (Game engine - rUGP)
