= Kevin M. Connolly =

American voice actor, script writer and ADR director (born 1974)

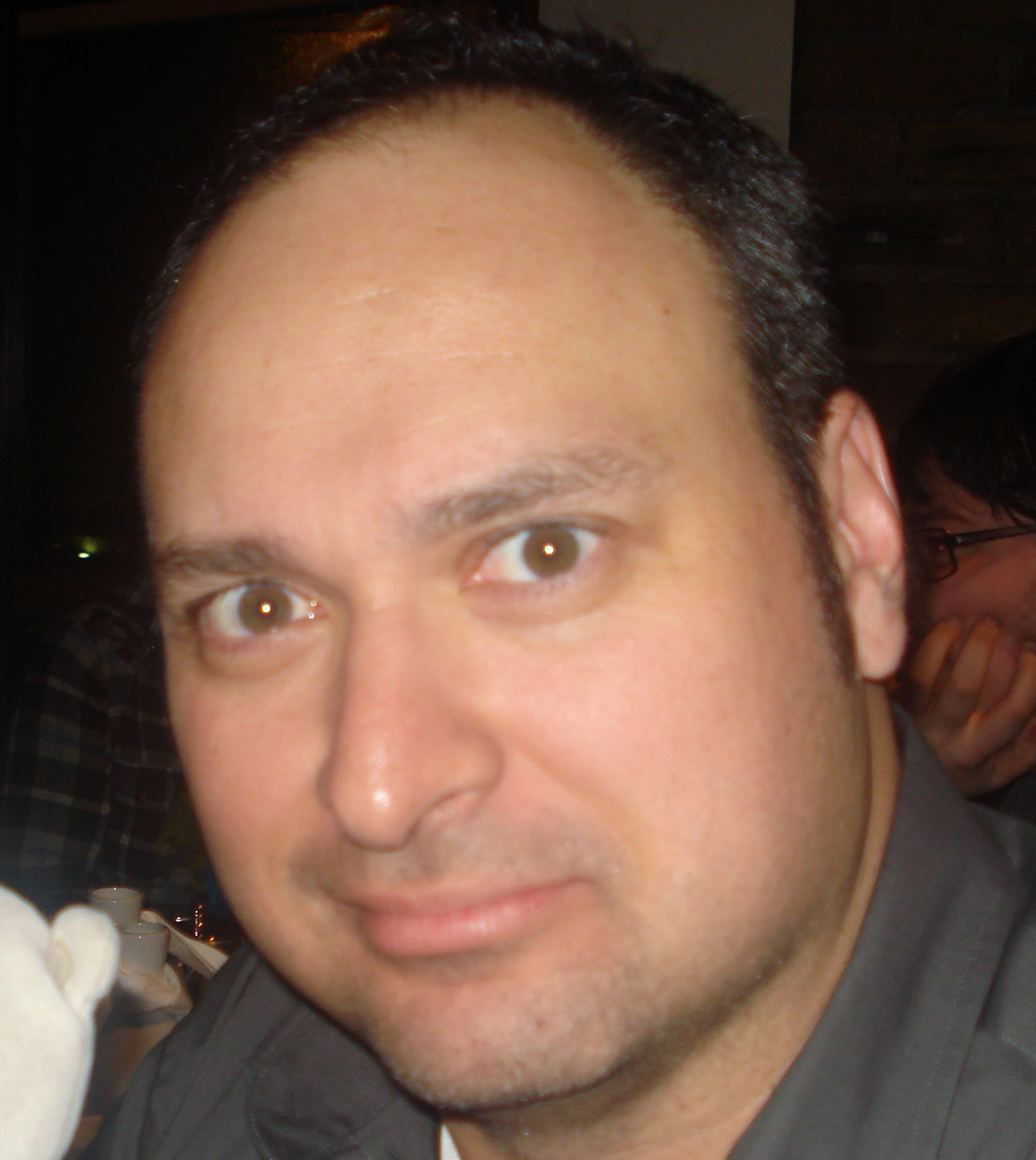
- Connolly in November 2009 during the Eirtakon after-con staff dinner.
- Born: Kevin Miguel Connolly; 1974 (age 51–52); Tucson, Arizona, U.S.
- Citizenship: USA, Ireland
- Education: University of the Incarnate Word; University of California, Los Angeles
- Occupations: Actor; Voice Over Artist; ADR director; Casting Director; script writer
- Years active: 1996 - Present
- Website: www.KevinMConnolly.net

Kevin Miguel Connolly (born 1974) is an American voice actor, ADR director, and script writer. He is known for anime dub voice acting for Funimation, and his first major anime role was Harley Hartwell in Case Closed. He has gone on to voice several major roles in Funimation anime titles, including Kain Fuery in the popular series Fullmetal Alchemist and the lead protagonist Takayuki Narumi in Rumbling Hearts. He has also done voice work for ADV Films, Bang Zoom! Entertainment, and Illumitoon Entertainment. He has since relocated to Los Angeles, California.

== Dubbing roles ==
=== Anime ===
- AM Driver – Roshette Keith
- BECK: Mongolian Chop Squad – Tanabe
- Beet the Vandel Buster – Cruss
- Big Windup! – Motoki Haruna
- Blue Exorcist – Nagatomo
- B't X – Prof. Kotaro 'Kit' Takamiya
- Case Closed (Funimation dub) – Harley Hartwell
- Darker Than Black – Alain (Ep. 1–2)
- Detective Conan: The Fist of Blue Sapphire – Leon Lowe
- Fullmetal Alchemist series – Kain Fuery
- The Galaxy Railways – Terry Goldman (Ep. 4)
- Guyver: The Bio-Boosted Armor – Officer Tsutomu Tanaka
- Hell Girl – Daisuke Iwashita (Ep. 3)
- Hunter x Hunter – Kastro
- Kodocha – Naozumi's Manager
- Mushishi – Kai (Ep. 18)
- Nura: Rise of the Yokai Clan – Demon Capital – Abe no Seimei
- One Piece (Funimation dub) – Pell, Zabo
- Ouran High School Host Club – Tomochika Sayko (Ep. 14)
- Pokémon Evolutions – Wyndon Stadium Announcer
- Ranking of Kings – Sorii
- Rumbling Hearts – Takayuki Narumi
- School Rumble – Shigeo Umezu
- Science Ninja Team Gatchaman (ADV dub) – MC (Ep. 66), Additional Voices
- Shin-Chan (Funimation dub) – Doyle
- Suzuka – Soichi Miyamoto
- Sword Art Online – Heathcliff
- The Saint's Magic Power is Omnipotent – Siegfried Salutania
- Tsubasa: Reservoir Chronicle – Fujitaka Kinomoto (Ep. 12, 17, 31)
- Witchblade – Yagi

=== Video games ===
- Ace Combat 7: Skies Unknown – AWACS Bandog
- Detective Conan: The Mirapolis Investigation – Harley Hartwell
- One-Punch Man: A Hero Nobody Knows – Additional voices
- Sengoku Basara: Samurai Heroes – Additional voices (warriors) Mobile Legends Bang Bang:- Alucard League of Legends:- Vladimir

== Staff work ==
=== English dubbing director ===
- Linebarrels of Iron – ADR Script
- One Piece – ADR Script
- Peach Girl – ADR Director
- School Rumble – ADR Director
