= Akane Maniax =

Japanese visual novel

- Jouji (left) and Akane (right)

アカネマニアックス〜流れ星伝説剛田〜 (Akane Maniax 〜Nagareboshi Densetsu Gouda〜)
- Genre: Drama, parody
- Video game
- Developer: âge
- Publisher: âge
- Genre: Visual novel
- Platform: Windows
- Released: May 1, 2002
- Original video animation
- Directed by: Tetsuya Watanabe
- Produced by: Katsuji Mizuta; Yoshiyuki Itō; Katsuyuki Kurasaki
- Music by: Yoshiki Minami; Ken'ichi Sudō; Ado Torai
- Studio: Silver
- Released: November 25, 2004 – August 26, 2005
- Runtime: 25 minutes each
- Episodes: 3

Akane Maniax 〜Nagareboshi Densetsu Gouda〜 (アカネマニアックス〜流れ星伝説剛田〜) is a visual novel released for the PC by âge in 2002. It was followed by a three-part video, simply titled Akane Maniax, which was released in 2004.

It is a prequel of sorts to Muv-Luv and side story to Kimi ga Nozomu Eien, and features Akane Suzumiya from Kimi ga Nozomu Eien as its main heroine. Like Muv-Luv Extra and unlike Kimi ga Nozomu Eien, it focuses more on comedy than drama.

The game starts several weeks after the end of Kimi ga Nozomu Eien and ends a day before Muv-Luv Extra starts. Most of the main characters from Muv-Luv can be seen in the game. It was originally released in parts with Tech GIAN without voice acting, but was later released as a game with full voice acting for members of âge's official fanclub.

There is also a three episode OVA roughly based on the game, with the first DVD released on November 25, 2004. The series was animated by Silver. Many characters in the game parody Tekkaman and Tekkaman Blade. The OVA mainly parodies robot shows such as Mazinger Z. Akane Maniax marked the first appearance of Gouda Jouji, who would later become a recurring gag character in âge's games.

== Plot ==
Jouji Gouda is a new transfer student at Hakuryo High School. On his first day of class, he fell in love at first sight for Akane Suzumiya and boldly proposed to her on the spot. The two characters conflict with each other greatly, but Jouji never gives up and would do anything to express his love towards Akane. Although his attempts to win Akane's love at first do nothing but anger Akane, he gradually starts to make an impression on her, inspiring Akane to be more honest about her own feelings.

There are two possible endings. In the good ending, Akane admits she might have developed feelings for Jouji—but confesses that she might be using him as a rebound guy since he reminds her of her sister's ex-boyfriend. He then finds a new true love in the form of Muv-Luv's Sumika, only to have his heart broken about a minute later when she goes running after Takeru. In the true ending, Jouji transforms into a hero called Dimension Knight Tekkumen (時空の騎士テックメン, "Jikuu no Kishi Tekkumen") and fights aliens. Either way, he is said to have transferred out of the school after being scouted for a baseball team in Muv-Luv Extra, which Kouzuki suggests might have been Meiya's doing.

In the ending of the later produced Akane Maniax OVA, Akane told Jouji that she has been accepted by an American university and will go there to further her studies. She still said it was nice to have met him. Later, after seeing Sumika running to Takeru, Jouji was taken away by Meiya and Tsukoyomi in their long limousine, presumably arranged to get some compensation and transfer to another school as a result.

== Characters ==
Jōji Gōda (剛田城二, Gōda Jōji); (Voiced by: Tomokazu Seki)
The main character of Akane Maniax. After being kicked out of his last school's baseball club, he transfers to Hakuryou with the intention of getting to the Koshien, paying no heed to the fact that he is a third-year student (i.e., he would never have another chance). He has a tendency to lose himself in his imagination, and is a bit of an idiot. He grows infatuated with Akane at first sight, and does whatever he can to get her attention. His character is a parody of Minami Jouji from Uchuu no Kishi Tekkaman, and in one of the endings he transforms into a parody of Tekkaman named Jikuu no Kishi Tekkumen. He first joins class 3-D, but is later dumped into class 3-B.
Akane Suzumiya (涼宮茜, Suzumiya Akane); (Voiced by: Kaori Mizuhashi)
From Kimi ga Nozomu Eien. The main heroine. In Akane Maniax, she starts off with the personality she had in Kimi ga Nozomu Eien, but gradually softens up to become the Akane seen in Muv-Luv. Student in class 3-D.
Andorō Umeda (梅田庵努朗, Umeda Andorō); (Voiced by: Yuuji Ueda)
A gym teacher sporting a yellow afro who is actually an alien. Has a mutant living in his afro. Based on Andlau (also pronounced Andorō) Umeda from Tekkaman. Only seen in the game.
Takeo Takeo (竹尾タケオ)
A Hakuryou student who looks like a fat nerd, but is in fact the robot Takesu. Student in class 3-D. Only seen in the game.
Chizuru Sakaki (榊千鶴, Sakaki Chizuru); (Voiced by: Masayo Kurata)
From Muv-Luv. Akane's friend and rival. Student of class 3-B.
Yūko Kōduki (香月夕呼, Kōduki Yūko); (Voiced by: Emi Motoi)
From Muv-Luv. Class 3-D's form teacher.
Marimo Jingūgi (神宮司まりも, Jingūji Marimo); (Voiced by: Minami Ayaka)
From Muv-Luv. Class 3-B's form teacher.
Kei Ayamine (彩峰慧, Ayamine Kei); (Voiced by: Yuuko Nagashima)
From Muv-Luv. Student in class 3-B. Jouji calls her "Psychic Gal".
Miki Tamase (珠瀬壬姫, Tamase Miki); (Voiced by: Minami Hokuto)
From Muv-Luv. Student in class 3-B. Jouji calls her "Ambassador of the Animal Kingdom".
Mikoto Yoroi (鎧衣尊人, Yoroi Mikoto); (Voiced by: Reiko Takagi)
From Muv-Luv. Student in class 3-B. Jouji calls him "Gaia's Messenger", or sometimes just Gaia. They seem to get along pretty well, but it does not take very long for Mikoto to forget who he is after he transfers out (in Muv-Luv Extra).
Sumika Kagami (鑑純夏, Kagami Sumika); (Voiced by: Hiroko Taguchi)
Muv-Luv's main heroine. Student in class 3-B.
Takeru Shirogane (白銀武, Shirogane Takeru); (Voiced by: Soichiro Hoshi)
The protagonist of Muv-Luv. Student in class 3-B.
Haruka Suzumiya (涼宮遙, Suzumiya Haruka); (Voiced by: Minami Kuribayashi)
From Kimi ga Nozomu Eien. Akane's older sister. Only seen in the OVA.
Meiya Mitsurugi (御剣冥夜, Mitsurugi Meiya; (Voiced by: Kazumi Okushima)
From Muv-Luv. Only seen in the OVA.
Mana Tsukuyomi (月詠真那, Tsukuyomi Mana); (Voiced by: Akiko Ueda)
From Muv-Luv. Only seen in the OVA.
Dimension Knight Tekkumen (時空の騎士テックメン)
Jouji after transforming via Tekku Setup. Looks like a cross between Tekkaman and a Gyan.
Takesu (タケス)
Takeo's true form, that of a robot. Based on Pegasu from Tekkaman Blade. Looks like a cross between Pegasu and a Zaku II. Serves as a mount for Tekkumen.

== Episodes ==
#	Title	Original release date
1	"Jouji Stands in Hakuryou" "Jouji Hakuryou ni Tatsu" (Japanese: 城二 白陵に立つ)	November 25, 2004
2	"Gouda Jouji, Join the Club" (Japanese: 剛田城二入部せよ)	March 25, 2005
3	"Farewell, Oh Beloved Jouji" (Japanese: さらば愛しき城二よ)	August 26, 2005

== Music ==
The game's normal route ending theme song is "Muv-Luv" (マブラヴ) by Minami Kuribayashi, and the true route ending theme song is Tekkumen no Uta (テックメンの歌) by Takayuki Miyauchi. For the OVA, the opening theme song is "Beginning" by Kuribayashi, the ending theme song for episodes 1 and 2 is "Arigato..." (ありがと...) by Kaori Mizuhashi, and the ending theme song for episode 3 is "Muv-Luv" by Kuribayashi.
