= Muv-Luv =

Japanese media franchise

- Original visual novel cover, featuring Meiya Mitsurugi (left) and Sumika Kagami (right)

マブラヴ (Mabu Ravu)
- Genre: Romantic comedy, Mecha, Eroge
- Video game
- Developer: âge
- Publisher: JP: âge (PC); JP: 5pb. (360, PS3, Vita); NA/EU: PQube (Vita); WW: aNCHOR (Steam, Switch); JP: NextNinja (mobile)
- Genre: Visual novel
- Platform: Microsoft Windows; Xbox 360; PlayStation 3; PlayStation Vita; Android, iOS; Nintendo Switch
- Released: February 28, 2003: Windows; JP: February 28, 2003 (Note: An all-ages version was released on September 22, 2006.); WW: July 15, 2016 Xbox 360; JP: October 27, 2011 PlayStation 3; JP: October 25, 2012 PlayStation Vita; JP: January 21, 2016; EU: June 8, 2018; NA: June 12, 2018 Android, iOS; JP: July 11, 2023 Nintendo Switch; JP: March 28, 2024; WW: July 11, 2024
- Manga
- Written by: Ukyou Takao
- Published by: MediaWorks
- Magazine: Dengeki Daioh
- Original run: 2003 – 2004
- Volumes: 3
- Manga

Muv-Luv Unlimited
- Written by: Tomo Hirokawa
- Published by: MediaWorks
- Magazine: Dengeki Daioh
- Original run: 2004 – 2007
- Volumes: 4
- Video game

Muv-Luv Alternative
- Developer: âge
- Publisher: JP: âge (PC); JP: 5pb. (360, PS3, Vita); NA/EU: PQube (Vita); WW: aNCHOR (Steam, Switch); JP: NextNinja (mobile)
- Genre: Visual novel
- Platform: Microsoft Windows; Xbox 360; PlayStation 3; PlayStation Vita; Android, iOS; Nintendo Switch
- Released: February 24, 2006: Windows; JP: February 24, 2006; WW: September 18, 2017 Xbox 360; JP: October 27, 2011 PlayStation 3; JP: October 25, 2012 PlayStation Vita; JP: January 21, 2016; EU: June 8, 2018; NA: June 12, 2018 Android, iOS; JP: July 11, 2023 Nintendo Switch; JP: March 28, 2024; WW: July 11, 2024
- Novel series
- Published by: Shueisha
- Imprint: Super Dash Bunko
- Original run: October 25, 2006 – June 30, 2009
- Volumes: 7
- Manga

Muv-Luv Alternative
- Written by: Azusa Maxima
- Published by: MediaWorks
- English publisher: âge
- Magazine: Dengeki Daioh
- Original run: August 21, 2007 – April 27, 2017
- Volumes: 17
- Video game

Muv-Luv Photonflowers* Muv-Luv Photonmelodies♮
- Developer: 5pb. Games âge
- Publisher: Mages (PS3); aNCHOR (PC)
- Genre: Visual novel
- Platform: PlayStation 3 Microsoft Windows
- Released: April 24, 2014 (Note: Muv-Luv Photonflowers*): PlayStation 3; JP: April 24, 2014 Windows; WW: August 2, 2019; August 28, 2014 (Note: Muv-Luv Photonmelodies♮): PlayStation 3; JP: August 28, 2014 Windows; WW: July 30, 2020
- Anime television series

Muv-Luv Alternative
- Directed by: Yukio Nishimoto; Hiroyuki Taiga (Note: Animation Director (アニメーションディレクター). Note: This credit refers to the person who acts as a middleman between the director and animation staff and, themselves, participates in series direction duties.)
- Written by: Tatsuhiko Urahata
- Music by: Evan Call
- Studio: Yumeta Company; Graphinica
- Licensed by: Crunchyroll; SA/SEA: Muse Communication
- Original network: Fuji TV (+Ultra)
- Original run: October 7, 2021 – December 22, 2022
- Episodes: 24
- icon

Muv-Luv (Note: Japanese: マブラヴ, Hepburn: Mabu Ravu) is a Japanese eroge visual novel developed by âge and originally released for Windows on February 28, 2003. Consisting of two parts, Muv-Luv Extra (Note: Japanese: マブラヴ エクストラ, Hepburn: Mabu Ravu Ekusutora) and Muv-Luv Unlimited, (Note: Japanese: マブラヴ アンリミテッド, Hepburn: Mabu Ravu Anrimiteddo) the interactive experience in Muv-Luv follows a branching plot line, which offers alternate scenarios and courses of interaction, focusing on the differing scenarios of the female main characters. Muv-Luv was followed by a sequel, Muv-Luv Alternative, (Note: Japanese: マブラヴ オルタネイティヴ, Hepburn: Mabu Ravu Orutaneitivu) which was released for Windows on April 24, 2006, and follows the storyline of Muv-Luv Unlimited.

The trilogy's story initially presents itself as a light-hearted romantic comedy (Extra), but changes into an alternate timeline coming-of-age story (Unlimited), and finally evolves into an alien invasion war epic (Alternative).

== Plot ==
The visual novel Muv-Luv is divided into two parts. The first part, titled Muv-Luv Extra, features playable character Takeru Shirogane (voiced by Sōichirō Hoshi, credited as Tsuyoshi Aiba in the Windows version) who wakes up one morning to find a beautiful young woman sleeping in his bed, just as an infuriated Sumika Kagami (voiced by Hiroko Taguchi, credited as Rika Fujiwara in the Windows version), Takeru's neighbor and childhood friend, comes to wake him up that morning. The young woman, Meiya Mitsurugi (voiced by Kazumi Okushima, credited as Aki Okuda in the Windows version), is the heiress to a financially powerful family and is determined to be Takeru's bride. As the story progresses, both girls compete for Takeru's affections while Takeru has recurring dreams about a marriage promise he made to a girl long ago. At first, he believes the girl was Sumika, but eventually realizes that it was actually Meiya. At the conclusion, Takeru must choose between which of the girls he truly loves. In addition, the player may also make decisions to choose between one of the three girls in the main supporting cast: Chizuru Sakaki (voiced by Masayo Kurata), Miki Tamase (voiced by Hitomi), and Kei Ayamine (voiced by Yūko Nagashima).

The second part, Muv-Luv Unlimited, starts with Takeru Shirogane waking up in his bed, reminiscent of the start of Muv-Luv Extra; however, Takeru quickly realizes that neither Meiya nor Sumika came to wake him that morning. Upon leaving his house, he finds his neighborhood destroyed and Sumika's house crushed under the wreckage of a large mecha. Takeru later learns that he is in an alternate world to Extra, where aliens called BETA (an acronym for "Beings of Extra Terrestrial origin which are Adversary of the human race") have invaded and mankind fights back against the alien aggressors with mecha called Tactical Surface Fighters, (戦術歩行戦闘機, Senjutsuhokōsentōki) usually referred to in Japanese as simply Senjutsuki (戦術機).

Muv-Luv Unlimited explains that the BETA first arrived on Earth in 1973 (in China and Canada) after arriving on the Moon in 1967 and being spotted on Mars in 1958. Subsequent battles with BETA resulted in the global population dropping to 2.4 billion with most of mainland Eurasia having been lost by the time the game starts in 2001. Most of the major characters from the Extra timeline are present in Unlimited, notably excluding the Unlimited world's Takeru, who is said to be dead, and Sumika, who does not seem to exist in the Unlimited timeline. The characters are mostly identical to their Extra counterparts, with the notable exception of Yoroi, Takeru's best friend in Extra who, for reasons unclear, is a girl in this reality.

In the sequel Muv-Luv Alternative, Takeru wakes up three years after the beginning of Unlimited to find himself back in his room. Although he first thinks that the events of Muv-Luv Unlimited were a dream, he soon feels that something is wrong, and leaves the house to find that he has been sent back in time to the beginning of the events in Unlimited. Unwilling to accept the events at the end of Unlimited, he decides to help Professor Kouzuki save the Earth and mankind by bringing the mysterious Alternative IV plan—cancelled at the end of Unlimited—to fruition.

== Gameplay ==
A typical conversation in Muv-Luv featuring the player character talking to Sumika

The gameplay in Muv-Luv requires little player interaction as most time is spent reading the text that appears on the lower portion of the screen, representing either dialogue between characters, narration, or the inner thoughts of the player character. Every so often, the player will arrive at a "decision point", and be required to choose between multiple options. Gameplay pauses and depending upon the player's choice, the plot will develop in a specific direction. There are multiple plot lines that the player can follow, one for each heroine in the story, and there are nineteen possible endings. To view all plot lines, the player must replay the game multiple times. The game can end in failure if the player makes the wrong decisions. When this occurs, the player can return to a previously saved spot to try again.

Muv-Luv is divided into two segments, or story arcs—Extra and Unlimited—which serve as different phases in the overall story. Initially, only the Extra arc is available to play, but once the player has completed the Extra scenarios for the two main heroines, Sumika Kagami and Meiya Mitsurugi, the Unlimited arc becomes accessible. The 2016 Steam release removes this lock and makes Unlimited available immediately, albeit with a warning that the player should experience Extra first.

== Development and release ==
=== Japanese releases ===
Muv-Luv was released on February 28, 2003, on Windows CD-ROM, and re-released on DVD-ROM on April 30, 2004. A fandisc, called Muv-Luv Supplement containing a number of short stories, computer wallpapers, audio clips, and a trailer for the upcoming Muv-Luv Alternative. The limited edition DVD was released on December 17, 2004, and the regular edition was released on December 24.

Muv-Luv Alternative is a sequel to Muv-Luv and taking place after the events of the Unlimited arc in the original game. The DVD version of the game was released on February 24, 2006, and the CD version was released on March 3, 2006. A Muv-Luv Alternative fandisc, Muv-Luv Altered Fable, was released on August 31, 2007, containing an alternate version of the Extra arc from Muv-Luv along with a radio drama, a Senjoki vs. BETA strategy RPG, computer wallpapers, and a Muv-Luv Alternative: Total Eclipse short story.

"All-age" versions of Muv-Luv and Muv-Luv Alternative with the eroge content removed were released simultaneously on September 22, 2006. In 2011, both games were ported to the Xbox 360 by 5pb. and simultaneously released on October 27, 2011. Both titles were also released for PlayStation 3 and PlayStation Vita in 2012 and 2016, respectively.

==== Sequel ====
In an October 2019 livestream producer Koki Yoshimune announced he was working on a new sequel to Alternative, called Muv-Luv INTEGRATE, but was not sure at that time what form the project would ultimately take or when it might be released.

=== English localizations ===
In the early 2010s, Mangagamer attempted to negotiate an English-language release of Muv-Luv and Muv-Luv Alternative, but talks broke down, and the translator unilaterally released an unofficial fan translation patch, effectively ending Mangagamer's efforts. In 2015, âge partnered with Degica to launch a Kickstarter campaign to officially release the Muv-Luv series in English. The campaign succeeded in late 2015 after raising over US$1.25 million, against an initial goal of $250,000. The campaign also met all of its stretch goals, including ports to PlayStation Vita and Android and English localizations of photonflowers* and photonmelodies♮ side-story collections. The English localization of the first Muv-Luv visual novel was released on Steam in July 2016, and Muv-Luv Alternative was released in September 2017. PS Vita versions of both games were released in June 2018. The English version of photonflowers* was released on Steam on August 3, 2019, and the English version of photonmelodies♮ was released on July 30, 2020. The English versions of Muv-Luv Unlimited: The Day After episodes 00 through 03 were released via Steam on February 5, 2021, marking the first English release of a Muv-Luv visual novel not directly funded by the 2015 Kickstarter. In addition to the crowdfunded Android version, the iOS port was also created. Mobile versions of Extra and Unlimited were planned to be released worldwide in Spring 2022, with Alternative set to release at a later date. They were all released as part of Japan-only mobile game, Muv-Luv Dimensions, on July 11, 2023.

== Related media ==
=== Manga and light novels ===
Muv-Luv and its sequel Muv-Luv Alternative have been adapted into three manga series by MediaWorks (later ASCII Media Works) and were serialized in the manga magazine Dengeki Daioh through 2018. In 2020, âge announced it would digitally self-publish an English translation of the Muv-Luv Alternative manga.

In addition, Shueisha has published a seven volume novel series based on Muv-Luv and Muv-Luv Alternative.

=== Anime ===
At the conclusion of an October 2019 live event, âge presented the on-screen title “Muv-Luv Alternative in Animation”, followed by a clip of new animation, seemingly indicating an anime adaptation of the original Muv-Luv Alternative visual novel. It was later announced that the new anime would be a television series. The series is animated by Yumeta Company and Graphinica, with production by Flagship Line, and is directed by Yukio Nishimoto, featuring Tatsuhiko Urahata handling the series' scripts, Takuya Tani designing the characters, and Evan Call composing the series' music. It aired from October 7 to December 23, 2021, on Fuji TV's +Ultra programming block. V.W.P performed the series' opening theme song "Rinne" (輪廻), while Stereo Dive Foundation performed the series' ending theme song "Tristar". Crunchyroll streamed the series. Muse Communication licensed the series in South and Southeast Asia.

At the end of the series' episode finale, a second season was announced. It aired from October 6 to December 22, 2022. (Note: Fuji TV lists the series premiere at 24:55 on October 5, 2022, which is effectively 12:55 a.m. JST on October 6.) JAM Project and Minami Kuribayashi performed the opening theme song "Akatsuki o Ute" (暁を撃て), while V.W.P performed the ending theme song "Saikai" (再会).

== Spin-offs ==
Muv-Luv has prompted many spin-offs, and is itself a spin-off of âge's Kimi ga Nozomu Eien and its sequel Akane Maniax, as it features several characters, locations, and story elements from those games. Muv-Luv Alternative also adds a character from âge's first visual novel, Kimi ga Ita Kisetsu.

=== Muv-Luv Alternative Chronicles ===
Muv-Luv Unlimited The Day After continues the story of Muv-Luv Unlimited, showing what happens after the end of that story and prior to Takeru's backward time-skip that begins Muv-Luv Alternative. Currently incomplete, TDA was released episodically (as episodes "00" through "03") as part of the Muv-Luv Alternative Chronicles series of side-story discs. In 2020, âge announced that it will release episodes 00 through 03 in English, and that work has begun on episode 04, which was subsequently retitled Muv-Luv Resonative.

=== Muv-Luv Alternative Total Eclipse ===
Muv-Luv Alternative Total Eclipse
- Cover art of volume 1
- Genres: Mecha
- Novel series
- Published by: Enterbrain
- Magazine: Tech Gian
- Original run: February 2007 – March 30, 2013
- Volumes: 6
- Manga
- Written by: Takashi Ishigaki
- Published by: MediaWorks
- Magazine: Dengeki Daioh
- Original run: 2009 – 2011
- Volumes: 3
- Anime television series
- Directed by: Takayuki Inagaki (1–2); Masaomi Andou (3–24)
- Written by: Takayuki Inagaki
- Music by: Seikou Nagaoka
- Studio: ixtl Satelight
- Licensed by: AUS: Hanabee; NA: Sentai Filmworks; UK: MVM Films
- Original network: TV Tokyo, TVO, TVQ, TVh, AT-X, TSC, TVA, Nico Nico Douga
- English network: NA: Anime Network
- Original run: July 2, 2012 – December 23, 2012
- Episodes: 24
- Video game
- Developer: 5pb. Games âge
- Publisher: Mages (PS3, 360); âge (PC)
- Genre: Visual novel
- Platform: PlayStation 3 Xbox 360; Microsoft Windows
- Released: PS3, Xbox 360: JP: May 16, 2013; Windows: JP: September 26, 2014; WW: July 20, 2022

Muv-Luv Alternative Total Eclipse is a spin-off story set parallel to Muv-Luv Alternative, following a new cast of characters while retaining the setting of the original visual novel. It focuses on the development of experimental TSF craft and the relationship between Yuuya Bridges, a Japanese-American test pilot and Yui Takamura, a leading figure in the development of a new generation TSF, which may be able to change the course of the war.

Enterbrain published Total Eclipse in its Tech Gian magazine. This was followed by a manga adaptation titled Total Eclipse published by ASCII Media Works. Muv-Luv Alternative: Total Eclipse was later adapted into the PlayStation 3 and Xbox 360 visual novel by âge and 5pb. in 2013. A Microsoft Windows version was released in 2014 in Japan, and was released worldwide in 2022.

On July 24, 2011, a teaser website announced that an anime television adaptation of the novels is in the works. Produced by ixtl and Satelight, it aired between July 2 and December 23, 2012. Crunchyroll has acquired the streaming rights for the series, with Sentai Filmworks licensing the anime for digital and home video release. The first 13 episodes were released on January 20, 2015, on Blu-ray and DVD.

=== Schwarzesmarken ===
Schwarzesmarken
- Cover art of volume 1
- Genres: Mecha
- Novel series
- Published by: Enterbrain
- Magazine: Tech Gian
- Original run: May 30, 2011 – March 29, 2014
- Volumes: 7
- Novel series

Schwarzesmarken Requiem
- Original run: July 30, 2012 – July 29, 2013
- Volumes: 2
- Novel series

Schwarzesmarken Bernhard in the Shadow
- Original run: September 30, 2015 – January 1, 2016
- Volumes: 2
- Video game
- Developer: âge
- Publisher: âge
- Genre: Visual novel
- Platform: Microsoft Windows
- Released: JP: November 17, 2015 (Note: Schwarzesmarken - Kouketsu no Monshou); JP: October 28, 2016 (Note: Schwarzesmarken - Junkyoushatachi)
- Anime television series
- Directed by: Tetsuya Watanabe
- Written by: Tatsuto Higuchi
- Music by: Evan Call (Elements Garden)
- Studio: ixtl Liden Films
- Original network: TV Tokyo, TVO, TVA, AT-X
- Original run: January 10, 2016 – March 27, 2016
- Episodes: 12

Schwarzesmarken (Note: Japanese: シュヴァルツェスマーケン, Hepburn: Shuvarutsesumāken; nonstandard German for "Black Marches", the correct version of which would be "Schwarze Marken".) is a series set in the Germany of the Alternative universe, during the early years of the BETA invasion in 1983. The protagonists are the 666th TSF squadron of East Germany, who fight both the BETA and opponents from the corrupt Stasi (Ministry of State Security).

Schwarzesmarken replaced the Total Eclipse serialization in Tech Gian magazine. The series is written by Hiroki Uchida and features character designs and illustrations by CARNELIAN. The novel was compiled into seven volumes following a 41 chapter run from 2011 to 2014. The series was followed in Tech Gian by its prequel, Bernhard im Schatten.

A visual novel adaptation by âge was released in 2015 for Microsoft Windows in two parts: Kouketsu no Monshou and Junkyoushatachi. Between the release of the two parts a Steam release and English localization of the visual novel was considered. However, despite this version of the game being approved via Steam Greenlight, it was ultimately not released.

On September 18, 2015, a teaser website announced that an anime television adaptation of the Schwarzesmarken novels by ixtl and Liden Films was scheduled to air in January 2016. The series began airing on January 10, 2016. Crunchyroll has acquired the rights to stream the anime outside of Japan.

=== Other ===
Several other prose spin-offs were published as short stories in Tech Gian magazine. In addition, two fandiscs were also released, Muv-Luv Supplement (Note: Japanese: マブラヴ サプリメント, Hepburn: Mabu Ravu Sapurimento) and Muv-Luv Altered Fable, (Note: Japanese: オルタード ALTERED FABLE, Hepburn: Mabu Ravu Orutādo Feiburu) containing alternate scenarios, short stories, computer wallpapers, and audio dramas. Other spin-off material appeared as short visual novels in re-releases of earlier games, and in the Muv-Luv Alternative Chronicles series. Some of these visual novel segments for PC were assembled into the collections photonflowers* and photonmelodies♮ for the PlayStation 3 in 2014, later ported to PC via Steam.

Aside from the visual novels, several other styles of games based on Muv-Luv have been released over the years. The browser game Muv-Luv Alternative: Next Answer launched in February 2015, and remained in operation for about a year. Muv-Luv Alternative: Strike Frontier, available initially as a browser game and later for iOS and Android, launched in September 2016, and shut down in July 2018. In October 2019, âge showed a demo of Project Mikhail: A Muv-luv War Story, a TSF-focused action game, released for Steam, iOS, and Android in October 2021, and available in Japanese, English, and Chinese.

Immortals: Muv-Luv Alternative, a free-to-play mobile action RPG developed by aNCHOR, was released in Japan on March 17, 2022, for both Android and iOS. Set in an alternative universe of Muv-Luv Alternative, the player plays as the director of the Immortals Private Military Company and leads a team of TSF mercenary pilots to battle the Beta. While the game has original characters, many of the characters from the Muv Luv franchise are also available to recruit which includes those from Muv Luv Alternative, Total Eclipse, Euro Front and Schwarzesmarken. Immortals was shut down approximately four hours after it was released due to an exploit, and was re-released on July 11, 2023, under the name Muv-Luv Dimensions. The game would later shutdown on June 30, 2025.

== Music ==
The opening theme of Muv-Luv is "Muv-Luv" (Note: Japanese: マブラヴ, Hepburn: Mabu Ravu) by Minami Kuribayashi. The closing theme for the Extra segment of Muv-Luv is "I Will" and the Unlimited segment's ending theme is "Harukanaru Furusato no Uta", (Note: Japanese: 遥かなる地球の歌; "Song of the Distant Homeland") both by Minami Kuribayashi. For the all ages version, the opening theme the Extra segment is "divergence" by Minami Kuribayashi. For the Unlimited segment, the opening theme is "Sion" (Note: Japanese: 紫音-sion-, Hepburn: Shion; "Violet Tone") by Masami Okui. The all ages version featured several ending themes depending on the ending, including "I will" by Minami Kuribayashi, "Kizu wa Kaseki ni Narenai Keredo" (Note: Japanese: 傷は化石にならないけれど; "This Wound Will Not Fossilize") by Aki Misato, "Astraea" by Miyuki Hashimoto, and "Little More" (Note: Japanese: リトル・モア) by CooRie.

The opening themes for the sequel Muv-Luv Alternative are "Asu e no Hōkō" (Note: Japanese: 未来への咆哮; "Roar Towards Tomorrow") by JAM Project for the original release and "NAME ~Kimi no Na wa~" (Note: Japanese: NAME ～君の名は～, Hepburn: Nēmu ~Kimi no Na wa~; "Name (Your Name Is)") by JAM Project for the all age release. The ending theme for both releases is "Muv-Luv (2005 ver.)" by Minami Kuribayashi. "Carry On" by Masaaki Endoh of JAM Project is used as an insert song in Alternative.

== Merchandise ==
The Muv-Luv franchise has prompted the creation of a wide variety of tie-in merchandise, including clothing, model kits, action figures, dakimakura (hug pillows), and more. Several tie-in books provide coverage of the franchise's lore, such as Muv-Luv Alternative Integral Works.

The Kickstarter campaign that funded the official English translation of the core trilogy commissioned new merchandise as rewards for backers. Unique items included a plush BETA toy, and Muv-Luv Alternative Codex, an English translation of most of Integral Works along with other material.

== Reception ==
Reception

Aggregate score
Aggregator	Score
Metacritic	PC: 76/100; Vita: 77/100; PC (Alternative): 83/100

In 2003, Muv-Luv was number one in national PC sales following its release. The sequel, Muv-Luv Alternative, released in 2006, was number three in sales during the first half of 2006.

Muv-Luv has received a median rating of 79 out of 100 on Erogamescape (EGS), while Muv-Luv Alternative has received a median rating of 93 out of 100, making it the third-highest rated visual novel on the website. On the Visual Novel Database (VNDB), Muv-Luv Alternative received an average rating of 9.13 (out of 10), making it the site's #1 visual novel by Bayesian ranking.

The English-language release of Muv-Luv has a Metacritic score of 76/100 based on reviews from four critics. RPGFan writer Don Kim gave the game a mixed review, writing "although Extra is nothing more than a glorified character introduction (and a terrible one at that), the game went far beyond my expectations in Unlimited, making the mediocrity of Extra almost forgivable."

Muv-Luv Alternative's English release has a Metacritic score of 83/100, based on reviews from six critics.

According to the manga author Hajime Isayama, his hit manga series Attack on Titan was inspired by Muv-Luv Alternative.
