= Carnelian (artist) =

Japanese manga artist

- Born: September 21, 1974 (age 51)
- Occupations: Visual novel character designer and illustrator
- Notable work: Moonlight Lady, Yami to Bōshi to Hon no Tabibito

Carnelian (born September 21, 1974) is a Japanese CG and dōjinshi artist. She had done artwork and character designs for various anime, products, visual novels, and regular novels. Some of her best-known visual novel games include Moonlight Lady, Yami to Bōshi to Hon no Tabibito, Day of Love, and Quilt. She established her own game company named Root, and occasionally draws dōjinshi.

== Works ==
=== Video games ===
List of works in video games
| Year | Title | Crew role | Notes | Source |
|---|---|---|---|---|
| 2000 | Day of Love | Original picture | Actress Company | |
| 2000 | Moonlight Lady | Character design and artist | | |
| 2000 | Yami to Bōshi to Hon no Tabibito | Original picture | | |
| 2005 | Quilt ja:きると | | | |
| 2007 | Toka Gettan | Original picture | | |
| 2015 | Schwarzesmarken | Character design and artist | | |

=== Anime ===
List of works in anime
| Year | Series | Crew role | Publisher, Notes | Source |
|---|---|---|---|---|
| 2003 | Yami to Bōshi to Hon no Tabibito | Character design draft | | |
| 2007 | Tōka Gettan | Character design draft | | |
| | The World God Only Knows | Ep. 2 end-card illustration | | |
| | Haganai | Ep. 4 end-card illustration | | |
| | Lagrange: The Flower of Rin-ne | Season 2, Ep. 1 end-card illustration | | |
| | Ace of Diamond | Eps. 1-70 end-card illustrations | | |
| 2016 | Schwarzesmarken | Character design | | |

=== Products ===
List of works in products
| Year | Series | Crew role | Notes | Source |
|---|---|---|---|---|
| | Aquarian Age: Sign for Evolution series | Character design and illustration | | |
| | Z/X series | Character design and illustration | | |
| | Hana Makura series 華枕 | Character design and illustration | | |
| | Aoki Lapis 蒼姫ラピス | Vocaloid character design and illustration | | |
| | Merli メルリ | Vocaloid character design and illustration | | |
| | ZOLA | Vocaloid character design and illustration | | |

=== Books ===
List of works in books
| Year | Title | Role | Notes | Source |
|---|---|---|---|---|
| | Carnelian Collection | Artbook | | |
| | Carnelian Museum-Orbit Works | Artbook | | |
| | Jewel Carnelian Artworks | Artbook | | |
| | Shosetsu Sashie Parareru (ぱられるロイド☆ヒトミ) | Novel illustrations | 2 volumes | |
| | Shakōkai engi: Chōshō wa hieta shitone o atatameru (社交界艶戯 寵妾は冷えた褥をあたためる) | Novel illustrations | | |
| | yoru chō wa kōreru koi no toriko (夜蝶は凍れる恋のとりこ) | Novel illustrations | | |
| | Misaki no ippatsugyakuten! (ミサキの一発逆転!) | Novel illustrations | 3 volumes | |
| | To na puri ōjo-sama no kyūjitsu (となプリ 王女様の休日) | Novel illustrations | | |
| | Purinsesu kontesuto (プリンセス コンテスト, Princess Contest) | Novel illustrations | | |
| | Gekka no miko (月下の巫女) | Novel illustrations | | |
| | MiX! series | Novel illustrations | Multiple volumes | |
| | Aruiwa nō no uchi ni sumu boku no kanojo (あるいは脳の内に棲む僕の彼女) | Novel illustrations | | |
| | Schwarzesmarken (シュヴァルツェスマーケン) | Novel illustrations | 7 volumes + 2 Requiem volumes | |
| | Shiinamachi-senpai no Anzenbi (椎名町先輩の安全日) | Novel illustrations | 4 volumes | |
