= Hiroko Moriguchi discography =

- Studio albums: 17 (Note: This includes the cover albums.)
- EPs: 1
- Compilation albums: 8
- Singles: 35
- Video albums: 11 (Note: This includes the music video compilation albums and concert DVDs.)
- Exclusive releases: 4

The discography of the Japanese singer-songwriter Hiroko Moriguchi consists of seventeen studio albums (including six cover albums), eight compilation albums, and thirty four singles released since 1985.

== Albums ==
=== Studio albums ===
Year	Information	Peak positions	
Year	Information	Oricon	Billboard Japan
1985	Mizu no Hoshi e Ai o Komete: Released: November 21, 1985 (LP); December 5, 1985 (CD); Label: Starchild; Formats: LP, CD, cassette	—	—
1989	Prime Privacy: Released: November 21, 1989; Label: Starchild; Formats: CD, cassette	—	—
1991	Tranquility -Yasashii Hoshi de-: Released: November 21, 1991; Label: Starchild; Formats: CD, cassette	—	—
1992	Hikkoshi wo Suru yo!: Released: September 16, 1992; Label: King Records; Formats: CD, cassette	—	—
1993	Issho ni Aruite Ikeru: Released: July 27, 1993; Label: King Records; Formats: CD, cassette	—	—
1993	Ashita Genki Nina are: Released: December 1, 1993; Label: King Records; Formats: CD, cassette	—	—
1994	Let's Go: Released: May 25, 1994; Label: King Records; Formats: CD, cassette	30	—
1995	Parade: Released: July 5, 1995; Label: King Records; Formats: CD, cassette	27	—
1996	Kitto Aitaku Narudeshō: Released: September 21, 1996; Label: King Records; Formats: CD, cassette	48	—
1997	Happy Happy Blue: Released: September 17, 1997; Label: King Records; Formats: CD, cassette	—	—
2021	Aoi Inochi: Released: August 4, 2021; Label: Sonic Blade; Formats: CD, CD+BD, digital	17	19
2025	Your Flower: Uta no Hanataba o: Scheduled: December 3, 2025; Label: King Records; Formats: CD, 2CD+BD, digital	14	TBA

=== Cover albums ===
Year	Information	Peak positions		Sales
Year	Information	Oricon	Billboard Japan	Sales
2019	Gundam Song Covers: Released: August 7, 2019; Label: King Records; Formats: CD, digital	3	5	JPN: 130,000
2020	Gundam Song Covers 2: Released: September 16, 2020; Label: King Records; Formats: CD, digital	2	4	
2022	Gundam Song Covers 3: Released: March 9, 2022; Label: Sonic Blade; Formats: CD, CD+BD, digital	3	3	
2023	Anison Covers: Released: May 24, 2023; Label: Sonic Blade; Formats: CD, CD+BD, digital	11	12	JPN: 6,492
2024	Anison Covers 2: Released: August 7, 2024; Label: Sonic Blade; Formats: CD, CD+BD, digital	8	6	
2025	Gundam Song Covers: Orchestra: Released: June 18, 2025; Label: Sonic Blade; Formats: CD, 2CD+BD, digital	7	—	
2026	Anison Covers 3: Released: December 16, 2026; Label: Sonic Blade; Formats: CD, CD+BD, digital	TBA	TBA	

=== Compilations ===
Year	Information	Oricon weekly peak position	Certifications
1989	Still Love You: Released: January 21, 1989; Label: Starchild; Formats: CD, cassette	—	
1991	Eternal Songs: Released: June 21, 1991; Label: King Records; Formats: CD, cassette	10	
1992	Eternal Songs II: Released: July 22, 1992; Label: King Records; Formats: CD, cassette	19	
1995	Best of My Life: Moriguchi Hiroko Single Selection: Released: November 22, 1995; Label: King Records; Formats: CD, cassette	18	RIAJ: Gold
1998	Kiseki: Best Selection: Released: February 21, 1998; Label: King Records; Formats: CD, cassette	—	
2000	All Singles Collection: Released: June 13, 2000; Label: King Records; Formats: CD	—	
2010	Single Best Collection: Released: July 7, 2010; Label: King Records; Formats: CD	100	
2013	Perfect Best: Released: October 2, 2013; Label: King Records; Formats: CD	—	

== Extended plays ==
Year	Information
1990	Vocal: Released: February 21, 1990; Label: Starchild; Formats: CD

== Singles ==
=== Regular singles ===
List of singles, with selected chart positions
Title	Date	Peak chart positions	Certifications	Album
Title	Date	Oricon Singles Chart	Certifications	Album
"Mizu no Hoshi e Ai wo Komete"	August 5, 1985	16		Mizu no Hoshi e Ai wo Komete
"Sumire no Kimochi -Try Me Again-"	February 21, 1986	87		Still Love You
"Still Love You"	April 21, 1987	—		Still Love You
"Kareha-iro no Smile"	November 21, 1987	—		Still Love You
"Endless Dream"	April 21, 1988; March 21, 1991	— 94		Still Love You
"Samurai Heart"	September 21, 1988	88		Prime Privacy
"Yume ni Aikagi"	August 21, 1989	—		Prime Privacy
"Koi wa Tahiti de Are-Are-A!"	August 21, 1990	32		Non-album single
"Eternal Wind (Hohoemi wa Hikaru Kaze no Naka)"	February 5, 1991	9	RIAJ: Gold	Eternal Songs
"Yasashii Hoshi de"	November 21, 1991	67		Tranquility -Yasashii Hoshi de-
"Yume ga Mori Mori"	May 21, 1992	50		Hikkoshi wo Suru yo!
"Speed"	September 24, 1992	15		Issho ni Aruite Ikeru
"Whistle"	June 9, 1993	10		Issho ni Aruite Ikeru
"Ai wa Yume no Tonari ni (Dear Formula 1 Pilot)"	October 21, 1993	25		Best of My Life: Moriguchi Hiroko Single Selection
"Let's Go"	February 16, 1994	13		Let's Go
"Yūwaku Shite yo ne Natsudakara"	June 22, 1994	37		Best of My Life: Moriguchi Hiroko Single Selection
"Lucky Girl (Shinjiru Mono wa Sukuwareru)"	November 3, 1994	30		Parade
"Motto Umaku Suki to Ietanara"	March 3, 1995	17	RIAJ: Gold	Parade
"Anata no Soba ni Iru Dake de"	June 21, 1995	20		Parade
"Anata to Itajikan"	September 21, 1995	17		Best of My Life: Moriguchi Hiroko Single Selection
"Shisen"	June 5, 1996	35		Kitto Aitaku Narudeshō
"Sono Mune no Naka de Zutto Zutto"	March 5, 1997	60		Happy Happy Blue
"Someday Everyday"	August 21, 1997	—		Happy Happy Blue
"Hitori ja Nai yo"	November 12, 1997	82		Kiseki: Best Selection
"Say Say Say"	November 6, 1998	—		All Singles Collection
"Ashita, Kaze ni Fukarete"	November 22, 2000	—		Non-album singles
"Yasashiku Naritai"	April 27, 2005	171		Non-album singles
"Mō Hitotsu no Mirai (Starry Spirits)"	November 28, 2007	23		Non-album singles
"Puzzle"	May 12, 2010	120		Single Best Collection
"I Wish (Kimi ga Iru Kono Machi de)"	June 17, 2015	43		Aoi Inochi
"Hoshi Yori Saki ni Mitsukete Ageru"	November 17, 2015	57		Aoi Inochi
"Sora no Kanata de"	November 16, 2016	58		Gundam Song Covers
"Torikago no Shōnen"	February 14, 2018	35		Aoi Inochi
"Akatsuki no Kuruma"	September 2, 2019	—		Gundam Song Covers 2
"Ubugoe"	June 1, 2022	10		Your Flower: Uta no Hanataba wo
"Eternal Days (Anata ga ite Yokatta)"	October 17, 2025	—		Your Flower: Uta no Hanataba wo
"—" denotes releases that did not chart.

=== Collaboration singles ===
List of singles, with selected chart positions
Title	Date	Peak chart positions	Album
Title	Date	Oricon Singles Chart	Album
"Izayuke Wakataka Gundan" (Collaboration with Full Monty)	March 26, 2003	—	Non-album single
"Knock!! Knock!! Knock!!" (Collaboration with Blooming Girls)	June 13, 2017	66	Knock!! Knock!! Knock!!
"Tsuioku Symphonia"/"Hatenai ano Sora e" (Collaboration with Mami Ayukawa)	October 23, 2019	11	Non-album single
"Soro Soro Fuyu desu nee" (As part of the unit Cutie☆MoriMori)	February 6, 2024	—	Digital single; billed individually under Moriguchi, Yu Hayami, and Iyo Matsumoto
"—" denotes releases that did not chart.

== Videography ==
=== Music video albums ===
List of media, with selected details
Title	Album details
Vitamines	Released: March 3, 1995; Label: King Records; Formats: LD, VHS

=== Live video albums ===
List of media, with selected details
Title	Album details
Hiroko Moriguchi 1st Concert: Baradoll Panic Hyû Hyû	Released: November 21, 1990; Label: Starchild; Formats: LD, VHS
Hikkoshi wo Suru kara Asobi ni Oide	Released: November 21, 1992; Label: King Records; Formats: LD, VHS
Heart Vitamine Tour '93: Tokidokidokidoki Shiyou yo	Released: September 22, 1993; Label: King Records; Formats: LD, VHS
Heart Vitamin Tour '95: Parade	Released: December 5, 1995; Label: King Records; Formats: LD, VHS
Hiroko Moriguchi Concert Tour '96: Sisen	Released: March 5, 1997; Label: King Records; Formats: LD, VHS
'05 Hiroko Moriguchi 20th Anniversary Concert: Deatte Kurete Arigatō	Released: July 2005; Label: King Records; Formats: DVD
'Hiroko Moriguchi 25th Anniversary Concert: Puzzle na Jikan	Released: December 2010; Label: King Records; Formats: DVD
'Hiroko Moriguchi 30th Anniversary Concert: I Wish (Kimi ga Iru Kono Machi de)	Released: October 28, 2015; Label: King Records; Formats: DVD
'Hiroko Moriguchi 35th Anniversary Concert: Aoi Inochi	Released: June 29, 2022; Label: Sonic Blade; Formats: Blu-ray

=== Exclusive releases ===
List of media, with selected details
Title	Album details
'97 Concert Tour Happy Happy Blue	Released: June 1998; Label: Club M (Hiroko Moriguchi Fan Club); Formats: VHS
'99 15th Anniversary Concert	Released: April 2000; Label: Club M; Formats: VHS
'01 New Year Live 2001: 21 Seiki e no Okurimono	Released: April 2001; Label: Club M; Formats: VHS
'02 Song for you Vol.1: tant tant tant	Released: 2003; Label: Club M; Formats: VHS

=== Other video releases ===
List of media, with details
Title	Album details
Idol Kogane Densetsu: Hiroko Moriguchi	Released: June 22, 2001; Label: Broadway; Formats: DVD
