= Gundam Song Covers 3 =

Studio album by Hiroko Moriguchi
- Released: March 9, 2022
- Recorded: 2021
- Genres: J-pop; jazz; pop rock; anison
- Length: 53:34
- Language: Japanese
- Label: Sonic Blade
- Producer: Daisuke Sohkawa

Hiroko Moriguchi chronology
Aoi Inochi (2021)	Gundam Song Covers 3 (2022)	Anison Covers (2023)

Alternative cover

Music video
- Gundam Song Covers 3 all songs digest on YouTube

Gundam Song Covers 3 is a cover album by Hiroko Moriguchi, released by Sonic Blade on March 9, 2022. The sequel to 2019's Gundam Song Covers and 2020's Gundam Song Covers 2, the album features Moriguchi's versions of 11 popular Gundam theme songs originally recorded by male vocalists. Musicians collaborating with Moriguchi in the album include pianist Kotaro Oshio, violinist Naoko Terai, Japanese choir VOJA, singer-songwriter Mami Ayukawa, guitarist Masayoshi Ōishi, Wagakki Band shakuhachi player Daisuke Kaminaga, pop duo Salt & Sugar, and rock band TM Network. The album cover, illustrated by Tsukasa Kotobuki, features Moriguchi cosplaying as Sayla Mass, with the RX-78-02 Gundam in the background.

The album is offered in CD only and CD with Blu-ray. In addition, two limited edition releases were offered. The first one was an LP-sized jacket with original stickers and an advanced lottery serial code to purchase a ticket to Moriguchi's "Starry People" concert at Hitomi Memorial Hall on May 3, 2022. The second limited release included a High Grade Universal Century 1/144 scale MSZ-006 Zeta Gundam Ver. Hiroko Moriguchi model kit. Fans who preordered the album received an A4-sized clear file and an illustrated box to store all three Gundam Song Covers CDs.

Upon its release, Gundam Song Covers 3 peaked at No. 3 on Oricon's Weekly Album Ranking on March 13, 2022.

== Track listing ==
All tracks are arranged by Kōichirō Tokinori, except 1 by Kenji Nishimura, 2 by Kotaro Oshio, 3 by Tetsuya Komuro, 4 by Satoru Shionoya, 6 by Masayoshi Ōishi and eba, and 7 by Naoki Kitajima.

CD
No.	Title	Lyrics	Music	Original series	Length
1.	"Tobe! Gundam (翔べ！ガンダム; "Fly! Gundam")"	Rin Iogi	Takeo Watanabe	Mobile Suit Gundam	4:16
2.	"G no Senkō (Gの閃光; "G's Flash")" (with Kotaro Oshio)	Iogi	Yūgo Kanno	Gundam Reconguista in G	3:39
3.	"Beyond the Time ~Möbius no Sora wo Koete~ (BEYOND THE TIME ～メビウスの宇宙を越えて～, BEYOND THE TIME ~Mebiusu no Sora o Koete~; "Beyond the Time ~Beyond the Möbius Universe~")" (with TM Network)	Mitsuko Komuro	Tetsuya Komuro	Mobile Suit Gundam: Char's Counterattack	5:36
4.	"Ikutsu Mono Ai wo Kasanete (いくつもの愛をかさねて; "With a Lot of Love")" (with Salt & Sugar)	Iogi	Motoyoshi Iwasaki	Mobile Suit Victory Gundam	5:33
5.	"Suna no Jūjika (砂の十字架; "Cross of Sand")"	Shinji Tanimura	Tanimura	Mobile Suit Gundam I	5:03
6.	"Stand Up to the Victory (To the Victory) (STAND UP TO THE VICTORY ～トゥ・ザ・ヴィクトリー～)" (with Masayoshi Ōishi)	Iogi; Reo Mikami	Tomohisa Kawagoe	Mobile Suit Victory Gundam	4:38
7.	"River" (with Naoko Terai)	Tatsuya Ishii	Ishii	Mobile Suit Gundam SEED	5:54
8.	"Meteor"	Akio Inoue	Daisuke Asakura	Mobile Suit Gundam SEED	4:24
9.	"Turn A Turn (ターンA ターン)" (with Daisuke Kaminaga of Wagakki Band)	Iogi	Asei Kobayashi	Turn A Gundam	5:28
10.	"Beginning (ビギニング, Biginingu)" (with VOJA)	Iogi	Daisuke Inoue	Mobile Suit Gundam III: Encounters in Space	4:01
11.	"Mobile Suit Zeta Gundam Medley (「機動戦士Ζガンダム」メドレー) (Bonus Track)" (with Mami Ayukawa • Zeta - Toki wo Koete (Z・刻をこえて; "Zeta - Transcending Times") • Mizu no Hoshi e Ai wo Komete (水の星へ愛をこめて; "From the Aqueous Star with Love"))	Iogi; Masao Urino	Neil Sedaka	Mobile Suit Zeta Gundam	4:56
Total length:					53:34

Blu-ray
No.	Title	Lyrics	Music	Length
1.	"Mizu no Hoshi e Ai wo Komete (with Naoko Terai)" (Music video)	Urino	Sedaka
2.	"Freesia (フリージア, Furījia) (with Satoru Shionoya)" (Music video)	Uru	Naoaki Iwami
3.	"Issenman-nen Ginga (一千万年銀河; "The Ten-Million-Year Galaxy") (with Satoru Shionoya)" (Music video)	Iogi	Hiroaki Serizawa
4.	"Kimi wo Mitsumete -The Time I'm Seeing You- (君を見つめて -The time I'm seeing you-; "Staring at You -The time I'm seeing you") (with Masato Honda)" (Music video)	Iogi; Yasuaki Shigemura	Shigemura
5.	"Tobe! Gundam" (Music video)	Iogi	Watanabe
6.	"Beginning (with VOJA)" (Music video)	Iogi	D. Inoue

== Personnel ==
- Yūki Muto – piano (track 1)
- Kōichi Tateno – guitar (track 1)
- Keito Hasegawa – bass (track 1)
- Kōhei Oe – drums (track 1)
- Shinsuke Tsujino – alto saxophone, soprano saxophone (track 1)
- Ryō Ogasawara – tenor saxophone (track 1)
- Kensuke Miyaki – baritone saxophone (track 1)
- Kenji Nishimura – trombone (track 1)
- Ryōta Sasaguri – bass saxophone (track 1)
- Hajime Gushiken – trumpet (track 1)
- Maaya Kawahara – trumpet (track 1)
- Kotaro Oshio – acoustic guitar (track 2)
- TM Network (track 3)

- Tetsuya Komuro – keyboards
- Takashi Utsunomiya – chorus
- Naoto Kine – chorus

- Shūta Nishida – acoustic guitar, electric guitar (track 3)
- Masayuki Akahori – bass (track 3)
- Salt & Sugar (track 4)

- Satoru Shionoya – piano
- Chikuzen Satō – vocals

- Kōichirō Tokenori – keyboards (tracks 5, 8, 10–11)
- Kenji Tsuneki – acoustic guitar, electric guitar (track 5)
- Park – bass (tracks 5, 10)
- Hiroshi Matsubara – drums (tracks 5, 10)
- Miho Nakamura – cello (tracks 5, 8, 10)
- Fumiko Aoki – viola (tracks 5, 9–11)
- Miho Shimokawa – violin (tracks 5, 8–11)
- Hiroko Imai – violin (tracks 5, 10)
- Shirō Sasaki – trumpet (track 5)
- Masayoshi Ōishi – guitar, chorus (track 6)
- Sonosuke Takao – piano (track 6)
- Eba – guitar (track 6)
- Naoki Kobayashi – bass (track 6)
- Akira Sakamoto – drums (track 6)
- Naoko Terai – violin (track 7)
- Naoki Kitajima – piano (track 7)
- Yusuke Nakaishi – bass (track 7)
- Ryō Arayama – drums (track 7)
- Yūichi Shima – acoustic guitar, electric guitar (track 8)
- Hiroyuki Deguchi – bass (tracks 8–9, 11)
- Haze – drums (tracks 8–9, 11)
- Akiko Seki – viola (tracks 8–9, 11)
- Moemi Harada – violin (tracks 8–9, 11)
- Daisuke Kaminaga – shakuhachi (track 9)
- Naoya Sasaki – guitar (track 9)
- The Voices of Japan (VOJA) chorus (track 10)
- Kenji Tsuneki – acoustic guitar, electric guitar (tracks 10–11)
- Mami Ayukawa – vocals (track 11)

== Charts ==
Chart (2022)	Peak position
Oricon Japanese Albums	3
Oricon Anime Albums	2
Billboard Japan Hot Albums	3
Billboard Japan Top Albums Sales	3
