= Your Flower: Uta no Hanataba o =

Studio album by Hiroko Moriguchi
- Released: December 3, 2025
- Recorded: 2022–2025; May 3, 2022 (Blu-ray)
- Venue: Hitomi Memorial Hall (Blu-ray)
- Studios: King Sekiguchidai Studio; Dutchmama Studio; Athor Studio; Onkyo House; Tomita Lab Studio
- Genres: J-pop; anison
- Length: 49:57
- Language: Japanese
- Label: King
- Producer: Daisuke Sohkawa

Hiroko Moriguchi chronology
Gundam Song Covers: Orchestra (2025)	Your Flower: Uta no Hanataba o (2025)	Anison Covers 3 (2026)

Singles from Your Flower: Uta no Hanataba o
- 1. "Ubugoe" Released: June 1, 2022; 2. "Eternal Days: Anata ga ite Yokatta" Released: October 17, 2025

Music video
- Your Flower: Uta no Hanataba wo all songs digest on YouTube

Your Flower: Uta no Hanataba o (Your Flower ～歌の花束を～; Your Flower: A Bouquet of Songs) is the 12th studio album by Japanese singer-songwriter Hiroko Moriguchi, released on December 3, 2025, through King Records as part of her 40th anniversary celebration. The album features the single "Eternal Days: Anata ga ite Yokatta", which is the sequel to her 1991 song "Eternal Wind (Hohoemi wa Hikaru Kaze no Naka)". Also included is "Ubugoe", the ending theme for the 2022 anime film Mobile Suit Gundam: Cucuruz Doan's Island.

== Background ==
To celebrate her 40th anniversary, Moriguchi reunited with several musicians who collaborated with her throughout her career, including former Princess Princess lead vocalist Kaori Kishitani, TM Network member Naoto Kine, and Kohmi Hirose, as well as songwriters Masao Urino, Yui Nishiwaki, Aki Hata, and Neil Sedaka.

The album is available in two editions: CD only and two-CD+Blu-ray combo, with the second disc featuring a remastered compilation of her greatest hits. The Blu-ray contains the music video for "Eternal Days: Anata ga ite Yokatta" and three live performances from Moriguchi's 2022 "Starry People" concert. In addition, King Records' "King e-Shop" website offers a special autographed box set, featuring a music box that plays "Eternal Wind (Hohoemi wa Hikaru Kaze no Naka)".

== Chart performance ==
Your Flower: Uta no Hanataba o peaked at No. 14 on Oricon's weekly albums chart.

== Track listing ==
All tracks are arranged by Kōichirō Tokinori, except where indicated.

CD
No.	Title	Lyrics	Music	Arrangement	Length
1.	"Eternal Days: Anata ga ite Yokatta" ((ETERNAL DAYS ～あなたがいてよかった～; "Eternal Days ~I'm Glad You're Here~"))	Yui Nishiwaki	Nishiwaki		4:21
2.	"Good Morning Good Night"	Airi Hiramatsu	Hiramatsu		4:10
3.	"Ganzo Baradol Nandamon!" (Ganzo Baradoru Nandamon! (元祖バラドルなんだもん!; "I'm the Original Variety Show Idol!"))	Kenichi Maeyamada	Maeyamada	Tomoyuki Otake	3:50
4.	"Forever and Ever and Ever and Ever..."	Kohmi Hirose	Hirose		5:45
5.	"Ubugoe"	Gorō Matsui	Doubleglass	Keiichi Tomita	6:16
6.	"Toshishita no Aitsu" ((年下のあいつ; "That Younger Guy"))	Kaori Kishitani; Hiroko Moriguchi	Kishitani		4:32
7.	"Doki ga Munemune ♡" ((ドキがムネムネ♡; "My Heart Is Pounding ♡"))	Moriguchi	Moriguchi	Yōichi Nozaki; Moriguchi	3:47
8.	"Pentas" (Pentasu (ペンタス))	Moriguchi	Yukie Nishimura	Nishimura	4:25
9.	"Seinaru Wakusei -Sanctuary-" ((聖なる惑星 -Sanctuary-; "A Sacred Planet -Sanctuary-"))	Masao Urino	Neil Sedaka		4:26
10.	"Eternal Wind (Hohoemi wa Hikaru Kaze no Naka) (Hiroko Moriguchi's 40 Voices a Cappella Version)" ((ETERNAL WIND ～ほほえみは光る風の中～ (40人の森口博子によるアカペラヴァージョン); "Eternal Wind ~Smile in the Shining Wind~"))	Nishiwaki	Nishiwaki; Yoko Orihara		4:$8
11.	"Magokoro Bouquet" (Magokoro Būke (真心ブーケ); "A Bouquet of Sincerity"))	Aki Hata	Naoto Kine		3:40
Total length:					49:57

Limited edition disc 2: Best Album
No.	Title	Lyrics	Music	Arrangement	Length
1.	"Mizu no Hoshi e Ai wo Komete" ((水の星へ愛をこめて ～35人の森口博子によるアカペラヴァージョン～; "From the Aqueous Star with Love"))	Urino	Sedaka	Kōji Makaino	3:42
2.	"Samurai Heart" (Samurai Hāto (サムライハート))	Yoshiko Miura	Yasuhiko Shigemura	Osamu Totsuka	4:23
3.	"Eternal Wind (Hohoemi wa Hikaru Kaze no Naka)"	Nishiwaki	Nishiwaki; Orihara	Satoshi Kadokura	4:46
4.	"Yume ga Mori Mori" ((夢がMORI MORI; "The Dream Is Mori Mori"))	Yasushi Akimoto	Toshiaki Matsumoto	Nobuhiko Kashiwara	4:13
5.	"Speed" (Supīdo (スピード))	Nishiwaki	Kaori Okui	Okui; Kashiwara	3:58
6.	"Whistle" (Hoissuru (ホイッスル))	Moriguchi; Nishiwaki	Okui	Okui	4:06
7.	"Lucky Girl (Shinjiru Mono wa Sukuwareru)" ((LUCKY GIRL～信じる者は救われる～; "Lucky Girl ~Those Who Believe Will Be Saved~"))	Hirose	Hirose	Hirose	4:55
8.	"Motto Umaku Suki to Ieta nara" ((もっとうまく好きと言えたなら; "If Only I Could Express My Feelings of Love More Effectively"))	Natsumi Watanabe	Michihiko Ohta	Akimitsu Homma	4:29
9.	"Anata to Itajikan" ((あなたといた時間; "The Time I Spent with You"))	Nishiwaki	Nishiwaki	Yasutaka Mizushima	4:34
10.	"Shisen" ((視線; "Line of Sight"))	Tetsuo Kudō	Hiromasa Ijichi	Mizushima	4:29
11.	"Someday Everyday"	Eri Hiramatsu	Hiramatsu	Nobuyuki Shimizu	3:32
12.	"Mō Hitotsu no Mirai (Starry Spirits)" ((もうひとつの未来～starry spirits～; "Another Future ~Starry Spirits~"))	Shinichirō Aoyama	Yasuyuki Tatō	Tatō	5:08
13.	"I Wish (Kimi ga Iru Kono Machi de)" ((I wish ～君がいるこの街で～; "I Wish ~In This City Where You Are~"))	Nishiwaki	Shintarō Itō	Itō; Tokinori	5:13
14.	"Hoshi Yori Saki ni Mitsukete Ageru" ((星より先に見つけてあげる; "I'll Find It Before the Stars for You"))	Hata	Kenichi Maeyamada	Maeyamada	3:56
15.	"Sora no Kanata de" ((宇宙の彼方で; "On the Other Side of Space"))	Yukinojo Mori	Takayuki Hattori	Hattori	5:37
16.	"Torikago no Shōnen" ((鳥籠の少年; "Boy in a Birdcage"))	Ryo	Masayoshi Kawabata	Kawabata	4:05
Total length:					71:00

Blu-ray
No.	Title	Lyrics	Music	Length
1.	"Eternal Days: Anata ga ite Yokatta" (Music video)	Nishiwaki	Nishiwaki
2.	"Speed" (Live)	Nishiwaki	Okui
3.	"Mizu no Hoshi e Ai wo Komete" (Live)	Urino	Sedaka
4.	"Kagirinaki Tabiji (限りなき旅路; "The Endless Journey") (with VOJA)" (Live)	Yuho Iwasato	Yoko Kanno

== Personnel ==
- Kōichirō Tokinori – keyboards and programming (1–2, 4, 6, 9–10)
- Tomoyuki Otake – keyboards and programming (3)
- Yōichi Nozaki – keyboards and programming (7)
- Yukie Nishimura – piano (8)
- Kenji Tsuneda – electric and acoustic guitars (1, 10)
- Yusuke Kokatsu – electric and acoustic guitars (2)
- Kenji Naruo – electric and acoustic guitars (4, 7, 9)
- Ryojirock – electric guitar (6)
- Shōta Moriguchi – bass (1–2, 7)
- Hiroyuki Deguchi (Monobright) – bass (6, 10)
- Hiroshi "Matsukichi" Matsubara – drums (1–2, 4, 6–7)
- Miho Shimokawa – violin (1, 4, 9)
- Emiko Ujikawa – violin (1, 4, 9)
- Akiko Seki – viola (1)
- Mikiyo Kikuchi – viola (9)
- Miho Nakamura – cello (1, 4, 9)
- Chieko Kinbara Strings – strings (5)
- Hideyo Takakuwa – flute (5)
- Michiyo Morikawa – flute (5)
- Hidehito Naka – clarinet (5)
- Yuka Takashi – clarinet (5)
- Otohiko Fujita – French horn (5)
- Akane Taki – French horn (5)
- Tomoyo Shoji – French horn (5)
- Naoto Kine – blues harp (10)

== Charts ==
=== Weekly charts ===
Weekly chart performance for Your Flower: Uta no Hanataba o
Chart (2025)	Peak position
Japanese Albums (Oricon)	14
Japanese Combined Albums (Oricon)	21
Japanese Download Albums (Billboard Japan)	61
Japanese Top Albums Sales (Billboard Japan)	13

=== Monthly charts ===
Monthly chart performance for Your Flower: Uta no Hanataba o
Chart (2025)	Position
Japanese Albums (Oricon)	42
