= Anison Covers 3 =

Studio album by Hiroko Moriguchi
- Released: December 16, 2026
- Recorded: 2026
- Genres: J-pop; anison
- Language: Japanese
- Label: Sonic Blade
- Producer: Daisuke Sohkawa

Hiroko Moriguchi chronology
Your Flower: Uta no Hanataba o (2025)	Anison Covers 3 (2026)

Alternative cover
- Blu-ray edition cover

Anison Covers 3 is an upcoming cover album by Hiroko Moriguchi, to be released by Sonic Blade on December 16, 2026. It is Moriguchi's third in a series of albums covering anime theme songs. The album is offered in two editions: CD only and CD with Blu-ray. A King Records Store exclusive set includes a 1/5 scale (approximately 30 cm.) acrylic stand of Moriguchi.

== Track listing ==
Anison Covers 3 track listing
No.	Title	Lyrics	Music	Original series	Length
1.	"Koi no Jumon wa Suki Tokimeki to Kiss (恋の呪文はスキトキメキトキス; "The Spell of Love is 'Suki Tokimeki no Kiss'")" (with Iyo Matsumoto and Yu Hayami)	Chinfa Kan	Izumi Kobayashi	Sasuga no Sarutobi
2.	"Cat's Eye" (with Marty Friedman)	Yoshiko Miura	Yuichiro Oda	Cat's Eye
3.	"Get Wild"	Mitsuko Komuro	Tetsuya Komuro	City Hunter
4.	"Itsumo Soko ni Kimi ga Ita (いつもそこに君がいた; "You Were Always There")"	Lou	Lou	Yawara!
5.	"Cobra"	Kayoko Fuyumori	Yuji Ohno	Space Cobra
6.	"Carnival Babel (カルナバル・バベル, Karunibaru Baberu)" (with Masayoshi Ōishi)	Miho Matsuba	Masaaki Iizuka	Blue Seed
7.	"Wind Climbing: Kaze ni Asobarete (Wind Climbing ～風にあそばれて～; "Wind Climbing: Toyed with by the Wind")" (with Mikio Sakai)	Aki Okui	Okui	Magical Circle Guru Guru
8.	"Boku de Aru Tame ni (僕であるために; "To Be Myself")"	Takashi Hamazaki	Flying Kids	You're Under Arrest
9.	"Soko ni Sora ga Aru kara (そこに空があるから; "Because the Sky Is There")"	Natsumi Watanabe	Kazumi Mitsume	Pokémon: Advanced
10.	"Chiisana Tenohira (小さなてのひら; "Small Palms")" (with Kotaro Oshio)	Jun Maeda	Maeda	Clannad: After Story

Blu-ray
No.	Title	Length
1.	"BS11 Anison Days Studio Live Selection: "Ru-Ru-Ru-Russian Roulette" (ロ・ロ・ロ・ロシアン・ルーレット) (from Dirty Pair); "Hajimete no Chū" (はじめてのチュウ; "My First Kiss") (from Kiteretsu Daihyakka); "19-sai" (19才; "19 Years Old") (from xxxHolic); "Tokimeki Tonight" (ときめきトゥナイト) (from Tokimeki Tonight); "Mōichido Aitai" (もう一度逢いたい; "I Want to See You Again") (from Mashin Hero Wataru); "Kasabuta" (カサブタ; "Scab") (from Zatch Bell!); "Himitsukichi" (秘密基地; "Secret Base") (from Eureka Seven); "Jajauma ni Sasenaide" (じゃじゃ馬にさせないで; "Don't Make Me Wild Like You") (from Ranma ½); "Hohoemi no Bakudan" (微笑みの爆弾; "The Smile Bomb") (from YuYu Hakusho); "Stay Alive" (from Taboo Tattoo)"
2.	"Get Wild" (Music video)

== Personnel ==
- Iyo Matsumoto – vocals (track 1)
- Yu Hayami – vocals (track 1)
- Marty Friedman – guitar (track 2)
- Masayoshi Ōishi – vocals (track 6)
- Mikio Sakai – piano (track 7)
- Kotaro Oshio – acoustic guitar (track 10)
