= Gundam Song Covers: Orchestra =

Studio album by Hiroko Moriguchi
- Released: June 18, 2025
- Recorded: 2025
- Genres: J-pop; anison
- Length: 44:50
- Language: Japanese
- Label: Sonic Blade
- Producer: Daisuke Sohkawa

Hiroko Moriguchi chronology
Anison Covers 2 (2024)	Gundam Song Covers: Orchestra (2025)	Your Flower: Uta no Hanataba wo (2025)

Alternative cover
- CD only release

Music video
- Gundam Song Covers: Orchestra all songs digest on YouTube

Gundam Song Covers: Orchestra is a cover album by Hiroko Moriguchi, released by Sonic Blade on June 18, 2025, to commemorate her 40th anniversary. The album features 10 covers of Gundam theme songs performed by Moriguchi and the Japan Pops Orchestra, including four new cover versions. It is offered in two editions: two-CD with Blu-ray set and CD only edition. The album cover, illustrated by Tsukasa Kotobuki, features Moriguchi cosplaying as Cecily Fairchild, with the Gundam F91 in the background.

Upon its release, Gundam Song Covers: Orchestra peaked at No. 7 on Oricon's Weekly Album Ranking on June 25, 2025.

== Track listing ==
CD
No.	Title	Lyrics	Music	Original series	Length
1.	"Eternal Wind ~Hohoemi wa Hikaru Kaze no Naka~ (ETERNAL WIND～ほほえみは光る風の中～; Eternal Wind ~Smile in the Shining Wind~)"	Yui Nishiwaki	Nishiwaki; Yoko Orihara	Mobile Suit Gundam F91	5:11
2.	"10 Years After"	Kyōko Asakura	Ichinen Miura	Mobile Suit Gundam: The 08th MS Team	4:29
3.	"Mizu no Hoshi e Ai wo Komete (水の星へ愛をこめて; From the Aqueous Star with Love)"	Masao Urino	Neil Sedaka	Mobile Suit Zeta Gundam	3:55
4.	"Tsuki no Mayu (月の繭; The Moon's Cocoon)"	Rin Iogi	Yoko Kanno	Turn A Gundam	5:15
5.	"Gin'iro Dress (銀色ドレス, Gin'iro Doresu; Silver Dress)"	Iogi	Kōji Makaino	Mobile Suit Zeta Gundam	4:12
6.	"Find the Way"	Mika Nakashima	Lori Fine	Mobile Suit Gundam SEED	5:22
7.	"Ai Senshi (哀 戦士; Soldiers of Sorrow)"	Iogi	Daisuke Inoue	Mobile Suit Gundam II: Soldiers of Sorrow	3:58
8.	"Flying in the Sky"	Yoshifumi Ushima	Ushima	Mobile Fighter G Gundam	3:44
9.	"Tōi Kioku (遠い記憶; A Distant Memory)"	Megumi Shiina	Shiina	Mobile Suit Gundam 0080: War in the Pocket	4:14
10.	"Meguriai (めぐりあい; Encounters)"	Iogi; Urino	Inoue	Mobile Suit Gundam III: Encounters in Space	4:26
Total length:					44:50

Disc 2 is an instrumental version of disc 1.

Blu-ray
No.	Title	Lyrics	Music	Length
1.	"Eternal Wind ~Hohoemi wa Hikaru Kaze no Naka~" (Music video)	Nishiwaki	Nishiwaki; Orihara
2.	"Eternal Wind ~Hohoemi wa Hikaru Kaze no Naka~" (Making of music video)

== Personnel ==
- Japan Pops Orchestra (Tacticart Orchestra)

- Natsuki Kishi – 1st violin
- Aoi Kurosawa – 1st violin
- Hiyori Kobayashi – 1st violin
- Momoko Sato – 1st violin
- Sako Nagasawa – 1st violin
- Arisa Nagashima – 1st violin
- Midori Hirota – 1st violin
- Rena Yamada – 1st violin
- Mizuka Ohashi – 2nd violin
- Akari Kajitani – 2nd violin
- Moe Hoshikawa – 2nd violin
- Juri Matsumoto – 2nd violin
- Kotono Yokoyama – 2nd violin
- Ayaka Wakayama – 2nd violin
- Aino Katayama – viola
- Kaho Sawada – viola
- Remi Sekine – viola
- Toko Tago – viola
- Julia Yamamoto – viola
- Hikari Okazaki – cello
- Suzu Onoguchi – cello
- Hibiki Sato – cello
- Sessyu Yagi – cello
- Ria Ashikawa – contrabass
- Shun Katayama – flute
- Yurino Uehata – flute
- Serena Hosaka – oboe
- Chihiro Ito – oboe
- Shigeya Watanabe – clarinet
- Yurie Shinotsuka – clarinet
- Riku Tsuboya – fagotto
- Yuka Nansai – fagotto
- Kisumi Ide – horn
- Ken Konno – horn
- Hajime Kudo – timpani
- Masataka Nagao – percussion
- Satoshi Ito – percussion
- Tomonori Imamura – piano
- Hiroshi "Matsukichi" Matsubara – drums
- Shota Moriguchi – bass
- Kenji Smith – electric guitar

== Charts ==
=== Weekly charts ===
Weekly chart performance for Gundam Song Covers: Orchestra
Chart (2025)	Peak position
Japanese Albums (Oricon)	7
Japanese Combined Albums (Oricon)	7
Japanese Anime Albums (Oricon)	1
Japanese Top Albums Sales (Billboard Japan)	8

=== Monthly charts ===
Monthly chart performance for Gundam Song Covers: Orchestra
Chart (2025)	Position
Japanese Albums (Oricon)	20
Japanese Anime Albums (Oricon)	3
