= Aoi Inochi =

Studio album by Hiroko Moriguchi
- Released: August 4, 2021
- Recorded: 2015–2021
- Studios: King Sekiguchidai Studio; Dutchmama Studio; Athor Studio; Bunkamura Studio; Sound City; Studio Magic Garden
- Genres: J-pop; anison
- Length: 36:00
- Language: Japanese
- Label: Sonic Blade

Hiroko Moriguchi chronology
| Gundam Song Covers 2 (2020) | Aoi Inochi (2021) | Gundam Song Covers 3 (2022) |

Singles from Aoi Inochi
- 1. "I Wish (Kimi ga Iru Kono Machi de)" Released: June 17, 2015; 2. "Hoshi Yori Saki ni Mitsukete Ageru" Released: June 16, 2016; 3. "Torikago no Shōnen" Released: February 14, 2018

Music video
- Aoi Inochi all songs digest on YouTube

Aoi Inochi (蒼い生命(あおいいのち); Blue Life) is the 11th studio album by Japanese singer Hiroko Moriguchi, released on August 4, 2021, through King Records (under the Sonic Blade label) as part of her 35th anniversary celebration. It is Moriguchi's first original studio album since her 1997 release Happy Happy Blue.

== Background ==
Following the success of her last two albums Gundam Song Covers and Gundam Song Covers 2, Moriguchi was motivated to record a new studio album. In June 2021, she announced the title of the album as Aoi Inochi, with its theme being Mother Earth and her connection with all living things. The album includes a new a cappella recording of her 1985 debut single "Mizu no Hoshi e Ai wo Komete", featuring 35 tracks of Moriguchi's vocals. Other tracks include "Torikago no Shōnen" (from the pachinko game CR Fever Mobile Suit Zeta Gundam), "Hoshi Yori Saki ni Mitsukete Ageru" (the ending theme of One-Punch Man), and "I Wish (Kimi ga Iru Kono Machi de)" (from the film Egao no Mukō ni).

The album is available in two editions: CD only and CD+Blu-ray combo. In addition, King Records' "Kinkuri-do" website offers a special autographed box set, featuring a music box that plays "Mizu no Hoshi e Ai wo Komete". The box set is limited to 350 units.

== Chart performance ==
Aoi Inochi peaked at No. 17 on Oricon's weekly albums chart, No. 19 on Billboard Japan's Hot Albums chart, and No. 16 on Billboard Japan's Top Album Sales chart.

== Track listing ==
CD
| No. | Title | Lyrics | Music | Arrangement | Length |
|---|---|---|---|---|---|
| 1. | "Aoi Inochi" ((蒼い生命; "Blue Life")) | Qoonie; Hiroko Moriguchi | Tomoari Taguma | Taguma | 4:21 |
| 2. | "Torikago no Shōnen" ((鳥籠の少年; "Boy in a Birdcage")) | Ryo | Masayoshi Kawabata | Kawabata | 4:02 |
| 3. | "I Wish (Kimi ga Iru Kono Machi de)" ((I wish ～君がいるこの街で～; "I Wish ~In This City Where You Are~")) | Yui Nishiwaki | Shintarō Itō | Itō; Kōichirō Tokinori | 5:13 |
| 4. | "Hidamari no Aru Basho" ((陽だまりのある場所; "A Place with a Sunny Day")) | Moriguchi | Satoru Kōsaki | Kōsaki | 5:06 |
| 5. | "Position" (Pojishon (ポジション)) | Moriguchi | Moriguchi; Tokinori | Tokinori | 4:43 |
| 6. | "Hoshi Yori Saki ni Mitsukete Ageru" ((星より先に見つけてあげる; "I'll Find It Before the Stars for You")) | Aki Hata | Kenichi Maeyamada | Maeyamada | 3:56 |
| 7. | "Inochi no Koe" ((生命の声; "Voice of Life")) | Moriguchi | Hiroshi Usami | Usami; Yuki Sekine | 4:45 |
| 8. | "Mizu no Hoshi e Ai wo Komete (Hiroko Moriguchi's 35 Voices a Cappella Version)" ((水の星へ愛をこめて ～35人の森口博子によるアカペラヴァージョン～; "From the Aqueous Star with Love")) | Masao Urino | Neil Sedaka | Tokinori | 3:51 |
| Total length: | | | | | 36:00 |

Blu-ray
| No. | Title | Length |
|---|---|---|
| 1. | "Aoi Inochi" (music video) |
| 2. | "Torikago no Shōnen" (music video) |
| 3. | "Hoshi Yori Saki ni Mitsukete Ageru" (music video) |
| 4. | "I Wish (Kimi ga Iru Kono Machi de)" (music video) |

== Charts ==
| Chart (2021) | Peak position |
|---|---|
| Oricon Japanese Albums | 17 |
| Billboard Japan Hot Albums | 19 |
| Billboard Japan Top Albums Sales | 16 |
