= Anison Covers =

Studio album by Hiroko Moriguchi
- Released: May 24, 2023
- Recorded: 2022–2023
- Genres: J-pop; jazz; pop rock; bossa nova; anison
- Length: 46:03
- Language: Japanese
- Label: Sonic Blade
- Producer: Daisuke Sohkawa

Hiroko Moriguchi chronology
Gundam Song Covers 3 (2022)	Anison Covers (2023)	Anison Covers 2 (2024)

Alternative cover
- Blu-ray edition cover

Music video
- Anison Covers all songs digest on YouTube

Anison Covers is a cover album by Hiroko Moriguchi, released by Sonic Blade on May 24, 2023. The album features 11 anime theme songs covered in jazz, acoustic, and bossa nova. It is offered in two editions: CD only and CD with Blu-ray.

Upon its release, Anison Covers peaked at No. 11 on Oricon's Weekly Album Ranking on May 31, 2023.

== Track listing ==
CD
No.	Title	Lyrics	Music	Original series	Length
1.	"Kanashimi yo Konnichi wa (悲しみよこんにちは; "Hello Sadness")" (with Mikio Sakai)	Yukinojo Mori	Kōji Tamaki	Maison Ikkoku	4:26
2.	"Sonomama no Kimi Deite (そのままの君でいて; "Stay Where You Are")" (with Satoshi Takebe)	Yuriko Mori	Ichirō Hada	Mobile Police Patlabor	4:12
3.	"Love Song"	Tomoko Tane	Akino Arai	Gasaraki	3:54
4.	"Romantic Ageru yo (ロマンティックあげるよ, Romantikku Ageru yo; "I'll Give You a Romantic Night")" (with Kotaro Oshio)	Takemi Yoshida	Takeshi Ike	Dragon Ball	3:54
5.	"Kaze no No Reply (風のノー・リプライ, Kaze no Nō Ripurai; "No Reply from the Wind")" (with Naoko Terai)	Masao Urino	Kyōhei Tsutsumi	Heavy Metal L-Gaim	4:01
6.	"City Hunter (Ai yo Kienaide) (CITY HUNTER ~愛よ消えないで~; "City Hunter ~Love Don't Disappear~")"	Yoshiaki Ōuchi	Osamu Totsuka	City Hunter	4:19
7.	"Egao ni Aitai (笑顔に会いたい; "I Want to See Your Smile")"	Miyu Yuzuki	Rie Hamada	Marmalade Boy	4:38
8.	"Ghost Sweeper" (with Marty Friedman)	Satomi Arimori	Toshiyuki Ōmori	Ghost Sweeper Mikami	4:07
9.	"Yume wo Shinjite (夢を信じて; "Believe in Your Dreams")" (with Satoshi Shionoya)	Hitoshi Shinohara	Hideaki Tokunaga	Dragon Quest	4:17
10.	"Happy Happy Dance (ハッピー²・ダンス, Happī² Dansu)" (with Yasuhiko Akasaka)	Yukinojo Mori	Ike	Cooking Papa	3:38
11.	"Samurai Heart 2022 (サムライハート ～2022～, Samurai Hāto 2022)" (Bonus Track)	Yoshiko Miura	Yasuhiko Shigemura	Yoroiden Samurai Troopers	4:32
Total length:					46:03

Blu-ray
No.	Title	Length
1.	"Kanashimi yo Konnichi wa (with Mikio Sakai)" (Music video)
2.	"Kanashimi yo Konnichi wa (with Mikio Sakai)" (Music video making)

== Personnel ==
- Naoko Terai – violin (track 1)
- Mikio Sakai – piano (track 2)
- Kotaro Oshio – acoustic guitar (track 3)
- Satoru Shionoya – piano (track 5)
- Satoshi Takebe – keyboards (track 6)
- Yasuhiko Akasaka (track 7)
- Marty Friedman – guitar (track 8)

== Charts ==
=== Weekly charts ===
Weekly chart performance for Anison Covers
Chart (2023)	Peak position
Japanese Albums (Oricon)	11
Japanese Combined Albums (Oricon)	15
Japanese Hot Albums (Billboard Japan)	12

=== Monthly charts ===
Monthly chart performance for Anison Covers
Chart (2023)	Position
Japanese Albums (Oricon)	29
