= Hiroko Moriguchi =

Hiroko Moriguchi 森口博子
- Born: Hiromi Hanamura (花村博美); June 13, 1968 (age 58); Fukuoka, Fukuoka Prefecture, Japan
- Genres: J-pop; anison; kayōkyoku
- Occupations: Singer; tarento
- Years active: 1982–present
- Label: King Records
- Website: www.mogeshan.net

Hiromi Hanamura (花村 博美, Hanamura Hiromi) (born June 13, 1968, in Fukuoka, Fukuoka Prefecture, Japan), better known by her stage name Hiroko Moriguchi (森口 博子, Moriguchi Hiroko) is a female Japanese singer and tarento. Moriguchi is affiliated with the talent agency NoReason Inc., where she also serves as Second Production Department Manager.

== Biography ==
The youngest of four sisters, Hiromi Hanamura (花村 博美, Hanamura Hiromi) lived with her mother after her parents divorced when she was eight years old. She graduated from Fukuoka City Takamiya Junior High School and Fukuoka Prefectural Fukuoka Chuo High School, then transferred to Horikoshi High School Performing Arts Course. Her classmates included Yōko Oginome, Kumiko Takeda, Miyuki Imori, Sayuri Iwai, Eri Murata, and Mie Takahashi. As a teenager, Hanamura performed as a backing singer in the Tokyo Music Academy performing arts group "School Mates" (スクールメイツ, Sukūrumeitsu). Before graduating from high school, she participated in several variety shows and quiz programs, also unsuccessfully auditioning for several idol singer competitions. Hanamura adopted the stage name "Hiroko Moriguchi" as a nod to musician Masaaki Hirao and female golfer Yuko Moriguchi.

After finishing second place in NHK's Winning Song Kayō Tengoku (勝ち抜き歌謡天国, Kachinuki Kayō Tengoku), Moriguchi signed with King Records and released her debut single "Mizu no Hoshi e Ai wo Komete", the second opening theme for the anime TV series Mobile Suit Zeta Gundam. The song reached No. 16 on Oricon's charts; her follow-up songs, however, failed to achieve the same success. In 1987, Moriguchi recorded the song "Kareha-iro no Smile" (枯葉色のスマイル, Kareha-iro no Sumairu; "Dead Leaf-Colored Smile") to promote the Kirin Lemon Whity drink. While the beverage sold well in Japan, the song did not make the Top 100 chart.

In 1988, Moriguchi recorded the song "Samurai Heart" (サムライハート, Samurai Hāto), the second opening theme for the anime series Yoroiden Samurai Troopers. That same year, Moriguchi also released her first gravure idol book and video Hiroko Moriguchi Photo Album (森口博子写真集, Moriguchi Hiroko Shashin-shū); her second gravure book, Wow!, was released in 1990.

In 1991, Moriguchi recorded "Eternal Wind ~Hohoemi wa Hikaru Kaze no Naka~" (ETERNAL WIND〜ほほえみは光る風の中〜; "Eternal Wind ~Smile in the Shining Wind~") for the anime film Mobile Suit Gundam F91. The song reached No. 9 on Oricon's charts and stayed in the Top 100 for 27 weeks. It also placed 47th in Oricon's annual ranking and consistently placed in NHK's Kōhaku Uta Gassen for six consecutive years, making it her biggest hit. She also recorded songs for the Fuji TV variety show Yume ga Mori Mori (夢がMORI MORI; "Dream Is Mori Mori") and was a mainstay during its run from 1992 to 1995. In 1995, an arcade game featuring Moriguchi called ''Moriguchi Hiroko no Quiz de Hyuu! Hyuu!'' (森口博子のクイズでヒューヒュー) was released. She released her third gravure book, Cool, in 1997. Throughout the 1990s, Moriguchi appeared in television commercials for companies such as Kao Corporation, National, Daihatsu, and Asahi Breweries.

In 2003, Moriguchi played Hiroko in the NHK TV series Teruteru Kazoku (てるてる家族; Teruteru Family) and made appearances in the TBS series Ai no Gekijō (愛の劇場; Theater of Love). In 2005, she was appointed as general manager of the Japan Amateur Baseball Association team Misaki Fukuoka Blossoms (福岡美咲ブラッサムズ, Misaki Fukuoka Burossamusu). However, she and co-manager Nobuyuki Kagawa resigned following a reorganization of the team, which has since been renamed Fukuoka Oceans 9 (福岡オーシャンズ9, Fukuoka Ōshanzu Nain).

On February 28, 2012, Moriguchi joined Yoko Minamino and Tomomi Nishimura to form the trio "Blooming Girls". Their debut single "Knock!! Knock!! Knock!!" peaked at No. 66 on Oricon's singles charts on June 13. In 2015, Moriguchi released the single "I Wish ~Kimi ga Iru Konomachi de~" (I wish〜君がいるこの街で〜; "I Wish ~In This Town Where You Are~") to commemorate her 30th anniversary in the music business. Since 2017, Moriguchi has been a participant in Nippon BS Broadcasting's Momoiro Uta Gassen (ももいろ歌合戦), held every New Year's Eve.

Moriguchi released Gundam Song Covers on August 7, 2019, to commemorate the 40th anniversary of the Gundam franchise. The album reached No. 3 on Oricon's Weekly Album Chart on August 16, making it her first top-10 album since 1991's Eternal Songs. On November 16, 2019, the album was announced as one of six recipients of the Planning Award at the 61st Japan Record Awards, which was held on December 30. Moriguchi's follow-up album Gundam Song Covers 2 was originally planned for release on June 10, 2020, but due to the ongoing COVID-19 pandemic, the release date was pushed to September 16, 2020.

In June 2021, Moriguchi announced the release of her 35th anniversary album Aoi Inochi (蒼い生命; Blue Life) on August 4. It was her first original studio release since her 1997 album Happy Happy Blue. Moriguchi also hosted a special concert at the Tokyo International Forum Hall C on October 3. In December 2021, Moriguchi announced the release of Gundam Song Covers 3 on March 9, 2022.

Following the release of Gundam Song Covers 3, Bandai Namco announced that Moriguchi would record "Ubugoe" as the theme song of the film Mobile Suit Gundam: Cucuruz Doan's Island. "Ubugoe" peaked at No. 10 on Oricon's charts, becoming her first top-10 since "Whistle" in 1993.

On March 4, 2023, Moriguchi announced the release of Anison Covers on May 24, an album featuring her covers of popular anime theme songs from the 1980s and 1990s.

In February 2024, Moriguchi, along with Yu Hayami and Iyo Matsumoto, released the single "Soro soro fuyu desu nee" (そろそろ冬ですネェ, It's almost winter, isn't it?) as part of the concert unit Cutie☆MoriMori, which she joined in 2017, replacing original member Chiemi Hori. The single was produced by Noritake Kinashi and written by George Tokoro. It was billed under each singer's individual discography, particularly on RecoChoku and Apple Music.

On August 7, 2025, as part of her 40th anniversary celebration, Moriguchi announced the release of the studio album Your Flower: Uta no Hanataba wo (Your Flower ～歌の花束を～; lit. Your Flower: A Bouquet of Songs) on December 3. The album featured collaborations with Kaori Kishitani, Naoto Kine of TM Network, Yukie Nishimura, and Aki Hata. In addition, the album included a new song composed by Neil Sedaka, marking his first collaboration with Moriguchi since "Mizu no Hoshi e Ai wo Komete" in 1985.

Moriguchi currently co-hosts the variety show Anison Days alongside singer/songwriter Mikio Sakai on BS11. She is also the host of her own radio show Kiss & Smile on Bay FM 78.

== Personal life ==
During the 1990s, Moriguchi suffered from cold sensitivity. Starting in 2000, she changed her diet and sleeping habits to remedy her condition.

== Discography ==
- Mizu no Hoshi e Ai o Komete (1985)
- Prime Privacy (1989)
- Tranquility -Yasashii Hoshi de- (1991)
- Hikkoshi wo Suru yo! (1992)
- Issho ni Aruite Ikeru (1993)
- Ashita Genki Nina are (1993)
- Let's Go (1994)
- Parade (1995)
- Kitto Aitaku Narudeshō (1996)
- Happy Happy Blue (1997)
- Gundam Song Covers (2019)
- Gundam Song Covers 2 (2020)
- Aoi Inochi (2021)
- Gundam Song Covers 3 (2022)
- Anison Covers (2023)
- Anison Covers 2 (2024)
- Gundam Song Covers: Orchestra (2025)
- Your Flower: Uta no Hanataba o (2025)
- Anison Covers 3 (2026)

== Bibliography ==
- Hiroko Moriguchi Photo Album
  (森口博子写真集, Moriguchi Hiroko Shashin-shū) (Fresh Scholar, 1988 May)
- Wow (Scholar, 1990 April)
- Cool (Bunkasha, 1997 June)
- Gekkan wa Kata ★ Rensai-chū
  (月刊はかた ★連載中) (2015 April)

== Filmography ==
=== TV ===
==== Kōhaku Uta Gassen appearances ====
Year / Broadcast	Appearance	Song	Appearance order	Opponent	Notes
1991 (Heisei 3) / 42nd	Debut	"Eternal Wind ~Hohoemi wa Hikaru Kaze no Naka~"	4/28	Smokey Mountain	
1992 (Heisei 4) / 43rd	2	"Speed"	1/28	SMAP	
1993 (Heisei 5) / 44th	3	"Whistle"	13/26	Takashi Hosokawa	Also performed a cover of "Moonlight Densetsu" with Fuyumi Sakamoto and Hikaru Nishida in a special segment.
1994 (Heisei 6) / 45th	4	"Let's Go"	6/25	SMAP	
1995 (Heisei 7) / 46th	5	"Anata to Itajikan"	7/25	Fumiya Fujii	
1996 (Heisei 8) / 47th	6	"Shisen"	17/25	Kenichi Mikawa	
