= TM Network: Live in Power Bowl =

1989 video game

- Cover art
- Developer: CBS Sony Group
- Publisher: CBS Sony Group
- Director: Ryotaro Hasegawa
- Producer: Tetsuji Yamamoto
- Designers: Headbad Kasahara; Muchiuchi Kodama
- Programmer: Parasol Tsunakawa
- Artists: Dark Kohjiro; Toboketa Okamoto
- Writer: Hiroyuki Nakada
- Composers: TM Network; Toshichan Zama; Tsukasa Masuko
- Platform: Family Computer
- Release: JP: December 22, 1989
- Genre: Adventure
- Mode: Single-player

TM Network: Live in Power Bowl (TMネットワーク ライブ イン パワーボウル) is a Japanese-only adventure game released for the Family Computer featuring the J-Pop group TM Network. The song used as the background music is "Come On Everybody" from their album Carol -A Day In a Girl's Life 1991- (using the 8-bit sound chip of the Family Computer). The game uses the Atlus Famicom/NES sound engine by Tsukasa Masuko.

== Story ==
A Soviet satellite launches nuclear weapons to South Korea, Japan, Taiwan, Hong Kong, and China on December 31, 1999.

The story starts on New Year's Eve in the year 1999 with the player lounging around in his room generally doing nothing early in the morning. After turning on his computer, he suddenly acquires information that the strategic defense satellite "Colosseum" has picked up some nuclear weapons being fired.

These nuclear weapons are being fired at a rapid pace between two forces (presumably the Americans and the Russians). Without knowing it, World War III is breaking out in front of the player. All the major cities in the world end up getting catastrophically damaged; including Paris, New York City and Washington, D.C. A nuclear blast mysteriously sends the player back to December 22, 1989; with only two days remaining until the official launch of the satellite system.

The nuclear war will not be prevented and civilization will destroy itself unless the player can manage to get the TM Network band to a concert for world peace even if he has to drive a truck to get them to their destination.

== Gameplay ==
Using his musical influence inspired by rock music, the player must persuade the world to declare global peace so that the nuclear war never happens. Using an interface that is utilized in graphic adventure games, the player interacts with the various members of the all-male band and various strangers. These people include the security guard, the office lady, and normal citizens of Japan. While some action components exist in the game, Live in Power Bowl: TM Network is mostly an adventure game in the vein of the classic time travel stories. However, the player has to watch how much information they let out. If he tells the wrong person that he is from 1999, then the game ends with him going to prison and the world is destroyed anyway due to World War III. Japanese literacy is required, as the entire game is in Japanese with only a few words of English spoken.

The game also includes a maze using 3D computer graphics (although not related to the BBC Micro and Acorn Electron game 3D Maze) and mini-games such as car chases.

Players can continue their game at any time using a 14-symbol password system consisting of common Japanese characters. They can also memorize telephone numbers from different sources (never actually shown on the screen) to use in an in-game telephone directory; it is possible to dial these numbers anytime while the game is in session.

An in-game picture of a Japanese prison, circa 1989. If the player tells the wrong person that he is from the year 1999, he will be locked up until the game ends.

== Characters ==
- Murata - The manager of the TM Network band who decides what the group has to do.
- Mark - The son of Mr. Guzausuki; one of the developers of the strategic defense satellite "Colosseum."
- Mitsuko - A journalist who ends up covering the world peace concert for the national media.
- The Hero - A nameless boy who travels back in time from 1999 with an Extreme Performance Computer called "MUE."
