= Mizu no Hoshi e Ai o Komete (album) =

Studio album by Hiroko Moriguchi
- Released: November 21, 1985
- Recorded: 1985
- Genre: J-pop; kayōkyoku; anison
- Length: 40:55
- Language: Japanese
- Label: Starchild

Hiroko Moriguchi chronology
Mizu no Hoshi e Ai o Komete (1985)	Still Love You (1989)

Singles from Mizu no Hoshi e Ai o Komete
- 1. "Mizu no Hoshi e Ai o Komete" Released: August 7, 1985

Mizu no Hoshi e Ai o Komete (水の星へ愛をこめて); From the Aqueous Star with Love) is the debut studio album by Japanese singer Hiroko Moriguchi, released through Starchild Records on LP on November 21, 1985, and on CD on December 5, 1985. The album's title track was co-written by Neil Sedaka and used as the second opening theme of the 1985 anime series Mobile Suit Zeta Gundam.

== Track listing ==
All tracks are arranged by Kōji Makaino.

Side A
No.	Title	Lyrics	Music	Length
1.	"Ryūsei wo Miteta Yoru" ((流星を見てた夜; "The Night I Saw the Meteor"))	Keiko Asō	Hideya Nakazaki	4:37
2.	"Hoshi ni Natta Koi" ((星になった恋; "The Love That Became a Star"))	Hiromi Mori	Hiroaki Sei	4:40
3.	"Winter Wink" (Uintā Uinku (ウィンター・ウィンク))	Asō	Kōji Makaino	3:57
4.	"Gin'iro Dress" (Gin'iro Doresu (銀色ドレス; "Silver Dress"))	Rin Iogi	Makaino	3:58
5.	"Slow Goodbye ga Kikoeru" (Surō Gubbai ga Kikoeru (スロウ・グッバイが聴こえる; "You Can Hear a Slow Goodbye"))	Asō	Masaaki Hirao	4:34
Total length:				21:46

Side B
No.	Title	Lyrics	Music	Length
1.	"Mizu no Hoshi e Ai o Komete (Instrumental)" ((水の星へ愛をこめて(インストゥルメンタル); "From the Aqueous Star with Love"))		Neil Sedaka	2:36
2.	"Smile Again"	Mori	Akihiro Yoshimi	3:44
3.	"Freeze"	Asō	Makaino	5:07
4.	"You (Itoshii, Hito)" ((YOU(愛しい、ひと); "You (A Lovely Person)"))	Mori	Makaino	4:03
5.	"Mizu no Hoshi e Ai o Komete" ((水の星へ愛をこめて; "From the Aqueous Star with Love"))	Masao Urino	Sedaka	3:39
Total length:				19:09

== See also ==
- 1985 in Japanese music
