= Gundam Song Covers 2 =

Studio album by Hiroko Moriguchi
- Released: September 16, 2020
- Recorded: 2019–2020
- Studios: Bellwood Records; Dutchmama Studio; King Sekiguchidai Studio; Sound Inn Studio; Victor Studio
- Genres: J-pop; jazz; pop rock; anison
- Length: 56:08
- Language: Japanese
- Label: King Records
- Producer: Daisuke Sohkawa

Hiroko Moriguchi chronology
Gundam Song Covers (2019)	Gundam Song Covers 2 (2020)	Aoi Inochi (2021)

Alternative cover

Music video
- Gundam Song Covers 2 all songs digest on YouTube

Gundam Song Covers 2 is a cover album by Hiroko Moriguchi, released in 2020 to coincide with the 35th anniversary of Moriguchi's music career. The sequel to 2019's Gundam Song Covers, the album features Moriguchi's versions of 10 popular Gundam songs, as voted on King Records' website from January to February 2020. It was released in two physical CD versions: a regular release and a limited edition release with an LP-sized jacket with a booklet and stickers. The album cover, illustrated by Tsukasa Kotobuki, features Moriguchi cosplaying as Cecily Fairchild, with the Gundam F91 in the background.

The album was originally planned for release on June 10, 2020, but due to the ongoing COVID-19 pandemic, the release date was pushed to September 16, 2020.

Upon its release, Gundam Song Covers 2 sold 33,000 copies and peaked at No. 2 on Oricon's Weekly Album Ranking on September 20, 2020, making it Moriguchi's highest charting album in her career.

== Track listing ==
All tracks are arranged by Kōichirō Tokinori, except 1 by Naoki Kitajima, 4 by Satoshi Takebe, 5 by Kotaro Oshio, and 8 by Satoru Shionoya.

No.	Title	Lyrics	Music	Original series	Length
1.	"Silent Voice (サイレント・ヴォイス, Sairento Voisu)" (with Naoko Terai)	Masao Urino	Hiroaki Serizawa	Mobile Suit Gundam ZZ	4:57
2.	"Gin'iro Dress (銀色ドレス, Gin'iro Doresu; Silver Dress)"	Rin Iogi	Kōji Makaino	Mobile Suit Zeta Gundam	4:25
3.	"Kimi wo Mitsumete -The Time I'm Seeing You- (君を見つめて -The time I'm seeing you-; Staring at You -The time I'm seeing you)" (with Masato Honda)	Iogi; Yasuhiko Shigemura	Shigemura	Mobile Suit Gundam F91	5:04
4.	"Itsuka Sora ni Todoite (いつか空に届いて; Reach Out to the Sky Someday)" (with Satoshi Takebe)	Megumi Shiina	Shiina	Mobile Suit Gundam 0080: War in the Pocket	4:12
5.	"Anna ni Issho Datta no ni (あんなに一緒だったのに; Although We Were Always Together)" (with Kotaro Oshio)	Chiaki Ishikawa	Yuki Kajiura	Mobile Suit Gundam SEED	4:19
6.	"Hoshizora no Believe (星空のBelieve; Believe in the Starry Sky)"	Machiko Ryū	Neil Sedaka; Phillip Cody	Mobile Suit Zeta Gundam	4:14
7.	"Dreams"	RO-M	RO-M	After War Gundam X	5:01
8.	"Issenman-nen Ginga (一千万年銀河; The Ten-Million-Year Galaxy)" (with Satoru Shionoya)	Iogi	Serizawa	Mobile Suit Gundam ZZ	4:04
9.	"Tsuki no Mayu (月の繭; The Moon's Cocoon)"	Iogi	Yoko Kanno	Turn A Gundam	5:20
10.	"Men of Destiny"	Yoshihiko Andō	Miki Matsubara	Mobile Suit Gundam 0083: Stardust Memory	4:06
11.	"Akatsuki no Kuruma (暁の車; Wheels of Dawn) (Bonus Track)"	Kajiura	Kajiura	Mobile Suit Gundam SEED	5:26
12.	"Kagirinaki Tabiji (限りなき旅路; The Endless Journey) (Bonus Track)" (with VOJA)	Yuho Iwasato	Kanno	Turn A Gundam	5:04
Total length:					56:08

== Personnel ==
- Naoko Terai – violin (track 1)
- Masato Honda – saxophone (track 3)
- Satoshi Takebe – piano (track 4)
- Kotaro Oshio – acoustic guitar (track 5)
- Satoru Shionoya – piano (track 8)
- The Voices of Japan (VOJA) – chorus (track 12)

== Charts ==
Chart (2020)	Peak position
Oricon Japanese Albums	2
Oricon Anime Albums	1
Billboard Japan Hot Albums	4
Billboard Japan Top Albums Sales	2
