= Anison Covers 2 =

Studio album by Hiroko Moriguchi
- Released: August 7, 2024
- Recorded: 2023–2024
- Genres: J-pop; anison
- Length: 46:53
- Language: Japanese
- Label: Sonic Blade
- Producer: Daisuke Sohkawa

Hiroko Moriguchi chronology
Anison Covers (2023)	Anison Covers 2 (2024)	Gundam Song Covers: Orchestra (2025)

Alternative cover
- Blu-ray edition cover

Music video
- Anison Covers 2 all songs digest on YouTube

Anison Covers 2 is a cover album by Hiroko Moriguchi, released by Sonic Blade on August 7, 2024. The album features 10 anime theme songs covered in jazz, acoustic, and bossa nova. It is offered in two editions: CD only and CD with Blu-ray.

Upon its release, Anison Covers 2 peaked at No. 8 on Oricon's Weekly Album Ranking and No. 6 on Billboard Japan's Hot Albums chart.

== Track listing ==
Anison Covers 2 track listing
No.	Title	Lyrics	Music	Original series	Length
1.	"Omoide ga Ippai (想い出がいっぱい; "Full of Memories")" (with Yūji Toriyama and Akira Jimbo)	Yoko Aki	Kisaburō Suzuki	Miyuki	4:10
2.	"Hohoemi no Bakudan (微笑みの爆弾; "The Smile Bomb")"	Hsiao-Lung Lee	Matsuko Mawatari	YuYu Hakusho	4:22
3.	"Ojamajo Carnival!! (おジャ魔女カーニバル!!, Ojamajo kānibaru!!)" (with Kanako Momota)	Shōko Ōmori	Takeshi Ike	Ojamajo Doremi	3:54
4.	"Tori no Uta (鳥の詩; "Bird's Poem")"	Jun Maeda	Shinji Orito	Air	6:09
5.	"Yume Ippai (ゆめいっぱい; "Full of Dreams")" (with Yūji Toriyama and Hiroki Kashiwagi)	Tomoko Aran	Tetsurō Oda	Chibi Maruko-chan	3:56
6.	"You Get to Burning"	Satomi Arimori	Toshiyuki Ōmori	Martian Successor Nadesico	4:04
7.	"Platinum (プラチナ, Purachina)"	Yūho Iwasato	Yoko Kanno	Cardcaptor Sakura	4:10
8.	"Be Free"	Yoshiko Miura	Yasuhiko Shigemura	Yoroiden Samurai Troopers	5:19
9.	"Blue Water (ブルーウォーター, Burū Uōtā)" (with Saburō Tanooka)	Etsuko Kisugi	Yoshimasa Inoue	Nadia: The Secret of Blue Water	4:43
10.	"Still Love Her (Ushinawareta Fūkei) (STILL LOVE HER(失われた風景); "Still Love Her (A Lost Landscape)")" (with Naoto Kine)	Tetsuya Komuro	Komuro; Naoto Kine	City Hunter 2	6:01
Total length:					46:53

Blu-ray
No.	Title	Length
1.	"Omoide ga Ippai" (Music video)
2.	"Omoide ga Ippai" (Music video making)

== Personnel ==
- Yūji Toriyama – guitar (track 1)
- Akira Jimbo – drums (track 1)
- Kanako Momota – vocals (track 3)
- Naoto Kine – guitar (track 10)

== Charts ==
=== Weekly charts ===
Weekly chart performance for Anison Covers 2
Chart (2024)	Peak position
Japanese Albums (Oricon)	8
Japanese Combined Albums (Oricon)	8
Japanese Hot Albums (Billboard Japan)	6

=== Monthly charts ===
Monthly chart performance for Anison Covers 2
Chart (2024)	Position
Japanese Albums (Oricon)	31
