= Mizu no Hoshi e Ai o Komete =

Single by Hiroko Moriguchi

from the album Mizu no Hoshi e Ai o Komete
- Language: Japanese
- English title: To the Aqueous Star with Love
- B-side: "Gin'iro Dress"
- Released: August 7, 1985
- Recorded: 1985
- Genre: J-pop; kayōkyoku; anison
- Length: 3:42
- Label: Starchild
- Songwriters: Neil Sedaka; Masao Urino

Hiroko Moriguchi singles chronology
"Mizu no Hoshi e Ai o Komete" (1985)	"Sumire no Kimochi -Try Me Again-" (1986)

Alternative cover
- Mobile Suit Zeta Gundam single cover

Music video
- "Mizu no Hoshi e Ai wo Komete" on YouTube

"Mizu no Hoshi e Ai o Komete" (水の星へ愛をこめて; lit. 'To the Aqueous Star with Love') is the debut single by Japanese singer Hiroko Moriguchi, released on August 7, 1985 under Starchild Records. The song was written by Neil Sedaka and Masao Urino, based on Sedaka's unreleased song "For Us to Decide". It is best known as the second opening theme of the 1985 mecha anime series Mobile Suit Zeta Gundam. The single peaked at No. 16 on Oricon's singles charts, making it Moriguchi's biggest single at the time until "Eternal Wind" charted at No. 9 in 1991.

In 2018, the song was ranked No. 1 on NHK's "Announcement! All Gundam Big Vote" (発表!全ガンダム大投票, Happyō! Zen Gandamu Dai Tōhyō). Moriguchi re-recorded the song for the 2019 album Gundam Song Covers. "Gin'iro Dress", the B-side, was ranked No. 2 on a 2020 poll hosted by King Records and was re-recorded by Moriguchi for the album Gundam Song Covers 2. An a cappella version of "Mizu no Hoshi e Ai wo Komete" was recorded for her 2021 album Aoi Inochi featuring 35 tracks of her voice. Moriguchi recorded another version of the song as part of the "Mobile Suit Zeta Gundam Medley" (alongside Mami Ayukawa's "Zeta - Toki wo Koete") on her 2022 album Gundam Song Covers 3. An orchestral remix of the song is included on the 2025 album Gundam Song Covers: Orchestra.

== Track listing ==
All music is arranged by Kōji Makaino.

No.	Title	Lyrics	Music	Length
1.	"Mizu no Hoshi e Ai o Komete" ((水の星へ愛をこめて; "To the Aqueous Star with Love"))	Masao Urino	Neil Sedaka	3:42
2.	"Gin'iro Dress" (Gin'iro Doresu (銀色ドレス; "Silver Dress"))	Rin Iogi	Makaino	4:00

== Charts ==
Chart (1985)	Peak position
Japan Oricon Singles Chart	16

== Cover versions ==
- Hiroshi Kumagai covered the song on the 1999 live album Mobile Suit Gundam Concert Special Live.
- Ikurō Fujiwara covered the song on the 2002 compilation album Eternal Love: Animation Healing Music 1.
- Yoko Ishida covered the song on the 2003 compilation album Best Max: The Power of New Animation Songs.
- Richie Kotzen recorded an English-language cover of the song titled "Blue Star" on his 2006 cover album Ai Senshi Z×R.
- Mikuni Shimokawa covered the song on her 2007 compilation Reprise: Shimokawa Mikuni Anison Best.
- MIQ covered the song on the 2007 compilation album The Best!! Super Robot Spirits -Girls Best Collection-.
- Chihiro Yonekura covered the song on her 2008 cover album Ever After.
- Yuko Suzuhana covered the song on her 2016 solo debut album Cradle of Eternity.
- Russian group Max Lux covered the song on their 2016 cover album Suna no Kajitsu: Fujiyama Paradise Tribute.
- Sugizo feat. KOM_I (Wednesday Campanella) covered the song as the second ending theme of the 2019 TV series Mobile Suit Gundam: The Origin - Advent of the Red Comet.

== See also ==
- 1985 in Japanese music
