= Kotaro Oshio =

Japanese guitarist (born 1968)

Kotaro Oshio (押尾 コータロー, Oshio Kōtarō, real name: 押尾 光太郎) is an acoustic guitarist from Japan. Born in Suita, Osaka, on February 1, 1968, he is best known for his work on the steel string guitar. Oshio is a part of Sony Music Japan's SME Records division. Oshio was voted the second greatest Japanese guitarist in a 2019 poll held by goo.

== Oshio's music ==
Oshio's music is classified within various categories including pop, new age, and jazz. Oshio's musical technique includes fingerpicking, tap harmonics, and a unique strumming style referred to as a "nail attack" in which he slaps the strings with the nails of his middle and ring fingers which is inspired by Michael Hedges. While his albums include mostly original material, Oshio is also known for his covers and movie soundtracks. His unique skill in interpretation and arrangement can be heard in tracks such as Merry Christmas, Mr. Lawrence from his album Starting Point.

== Oshio's career ==
Oshio released his first indie record in December 1999, which was followed by a second indie album in March 2001. In July 2002, he released his first major record label album Starting Point and performed at the Montreux Jazz Festival with B.B. King.

== Discography ==
- Kotaro Oshio (December 18, 1999)
- Love Strings (March 22, 2001)
- Starting Point (July 10, 2002)
- Dramatic (June 18, 2003)
- Be Happy (June 23, 2004)
- BOLERO!Be Happy Live (December 15, 2004)
- Panorama (September 7, 2005)
- Blue sky〜Kotaro Oshio Best Album〜 (September 29, 2006)
- Color of Life (November 29, 2006)
- Nature Spirit (Jan 1st, 2008)
- You & Me (Oct 1st, 2008)
- Tussie Mussie (Mar 11, 2009)
- Eternal Chain (Aug 5, 2009)
- Hand to Hand (Jan 12, 2011)
- Reboot & Collabo. (April 24, 2013)
- Pandora (July 30, 2014)
- Tussie Mussie II -Love Cinema- (November 25, 2015)
- KTRxGTR (November 9, 2016)
- PICK POP! 〜J-Hits Acoustic Covers〜 (September 19, 2018)
- Encounter (February 20, 2019)
- PASSENGER (September 30, 2020)
- 20th Anniversary "My Guitar, My Life" ( September 28, 2022)

As a featured artist

- Gundam Song Covers (August 7, 2019)
- Gundam Song Covers 2 (September 16, 2020)
- Gundam Song Covers 3 (March 9, 2022)
