= Mami Ayukawa =

Japanese singer (born 1961)

Mami Ayukawa 鮎川麻弥
- Born: Masami Katou (加藤雅弥); March 29, 1961 (age 65)
- Origin: Shinjuku, Tokyo, Japan
- Genres: J-pop
- Occupation: Singer
- Years active: 1984–present
- Labels: King Records; EMI Music
- Website: Mami Ayukawa

Mami Ayukawa (鮎川 麻弥, Ayukawa Mami; born on March 29, 1961) is a Japanese singer from Shinjuku, Tokyo, Japan.

== Theme songs ==
- Kaze no No Reply (風のノー・リプライ), second opening theme song from TV series Heavy Metal L-Gaim (1984)
- Zeta – Toki wo Koete (Z・刻をこえて), first opening theme song from TV series Mobile Suit Zeta Gundam (1985)
- Hoshizora no Believe (星空のBelieve), ending theme song from TV series Mobile Suit Zeta Gundam (1985)
- Yume Iro Chaser (夢色チェイサー), first opening theme song from TV series Metal Armor Dragonar (1987)
- Illusion wo Sagashite (イリュージョンをさがして), first ending theme song from TV series Metal Armor Dragonar (1987)

== Discography ==
=== Singles ===
- "Tsuioku Symphonia"/"Hatenai ano Sora e" (追憶シンフォニア/果てないあの宇宙へ; "Recollection Symphonia"/"To That Endless Universe") – Collaboration with Hiroko Moriguchi (October 23, 2019)

=== Albums ===
- 走Do愛 (1984)

Vinyl Side A
No.	Title	Length
1.	"Rolling Night Party"
2.	"Windy Sensation"
3.	"The Dream"
4.	"Personality"
5.	"Still Love You"

Vinyl Side B
No.	Title	Length
1.	"ガラスのBeat Way"
2.	"Stop! In The Name Of Love"
3.	"Take Off My Heart"
4.	"風のノー・リプライ"
5.	"ため息はピアニッシモで"

- Fifty Fifty (1985)

CD
No.	Title	Length
1.	"Who Is It?"	3:39
2.	"悲しきアウトロー"	4:45
3.	"Good Vibration"	3:17
4.	"愛はロマネスク You're My Heart, You're My Soul"	3:46
5.	"何も言わないで..."	4:38
6.	"Jump Up"	3:46
7.	"Rainy Magic"	4:49
8.	"Silver Moon - And They Played Our Song"	3:46
9.	"紫 Pain パープル"	4:08
10.	"All Together"	3:39

- Candy Game = キャンディ・ゲーム (1985)

CD
No.	Title	Length
1.	"キャンディ・ゲーム"	3:04
2.	"モザイクのクィーン"	3:41
3.	"潮風のディンギー"	3:38
4.	"宵やみはスローに･･････"	4:38
5.	"コバルトブルーの恋人"	4:50
6.	"シークレット･ラブ"	3:55
7.	"マニキュア"	3:26
8.	"幸福のセオリー"	5:04
9.	"Tenderness"	4:17
10.	"Z・刻をこえて"	3:33

- Face 鮎川麻弥 IV (1986)

CD
No.	Title	Length
1.	"Another Face"	4:25
2.	"Twi-a Twi-a"	4:27
3.	"銀の手鏡"	4:29
4.	"Good-bye To Love"	3:55
5.	"ルート134"	4:24
6.	"セピア色の情景へ -His Favorite Things-"	4:09
7.	"読みかけのミステリー"	4:10
8.	"My ア・ラ・カルト"	3:23
9.	"見えない翼"	4:20
10.	"陽炎 -Heat Wave-"	4:04

- Chase 鮎川麻弥 V (1986)

CD
No.	Title	Length
1.	"ジンクスは信じない"	4:23
2.	"Wのウィスパー"	3:42
3.	"冬のカーニバル"	4:56
4.	"Star Dust Blues"	5:14
5.	"ムーンアヴェニューの影になって"	4:40
6.	"アクセル On"	4:02
7.	"太陽少年"	4:20
8.	"クラクション"	3:39
9.	"Approach"	3:40
10.	"エピローグ -Dress Up The Night-"	5:48

- Mami Selection. Melting Point. (1987)

CD
No.	Title	Length
1.	"ハイヌーン ボディー"	4:08
2.	"愛はロマネスク"	3:49
3.	"夢色チェイサー"	3:33
4.	"Z・刻をこえて(ロングバージョン)"	4:56
5.	"イリュージョンをさがして"	3:31
6.	"風のノーリプライ"	3:32
7.	"とびきり Sexy Magic"	4:09
8.	"ワンダーランド"	4:41
9.	"Rainy Love"	3:41
10.	"星空の Believe"	3:30

- 新視界 (1987)

CD
No.	Title	Length
1.	"風が聴こえる朝"
2.	"45rpmのGod Bless You"
3.	"錆びたギャンブラー"
4.	"110km/hのハーバー・ライト"
5.	"雨のダイアリー"
6.	"Merry X'mas, Sorry X'mas"
7.	"キャンセルの余韻"
8.	"5分だけ待ってあげる"
9.	"週末の少年"
10.	"1 Second"

- Smile (1988)

CD
No.	Title	Length
1.	"Intense 情熱"	4:21
2.	"ねぇ きいてるの?"	4:05
3.	"プラスティックNight"	4:52
4.	"何処で逢っても泣かない"	4:35
5.	"Don't Worry"	4:50
6.	"True Love"	4:12
7.	"Smoky Townをさまよって"	3:52
8.	"その時 彼女は..."	4:04
9.	"あの頃にスマイル"	4:35
10.	"Remember"	5:05

- Restless Hearts (1989)

CD
No.	Title	Length
1.	"Be Mine"	4:59
2.	"Rose Iro No Kanata De"	4:36
3.	"My Restless Heart"	5:32
4.	"Cool Love"	4:17
5.	"I Love You"	5:28
6.	"Hey! You Buddy"	4:42
7.	"Babylonian Dream"	5:33
8.	"Long Distance #813"	5:34
9.	"Shimatsu No Irwin Shaw"	4:22
10.	"A Song For You"	3:58

- 101番目の恋 = Hundred And First Love (1990)

CD
No.	Title	Length
1.	"101番目の恋"
2.	"Trouble Makers"
3.	"土曜日の恋、日曜日の朝"
4.	"Moon Shadow"
5.	"思い出にならない"
6.	"夢見る頃を過ぎても"
7.	"Sleep Walker"
8.	"Too Late～手遅れの彼"
9.	"ぬくもりの時間"
10.	"Good-Bye Sweet Days"
