= Whistle (Hiroko Moriguchi song) =

Single by Hiroko Moriguchi

from the album Issho ni Aruite Ikeru
- Language: Japanese
- B-side: "Sora kara no Tegami"
- Released: June 9, 1993
- Recorded: 1993
- Genre: J-pop; pop rock
- Label: King Records
- Songwriters: Hiroko Moriguchi; Yui Nishiwaki; Kaori Okui
- Producer: Kaori Okui

Hiroko Moriguchi singles chronology
"Speed" (1992)	"Whistle" (1993)	"Ai wa Yume no Tonari ni ~Dear Formula 1 Pilot~" (1993)

"Whistle" (ホイッスル, Hoissuru) is the 13th single by Japanese singer Hiroko Moriguchi. Written by Moriguchi, Yui Nishiwaki and Kaori Okui, the single was released on June 9, 1993 under King Records.

== Background and release ==
"Whistle" was Moriguchi's second collaboration with Princess Princess lead vocalist/songwriter Kaori Okui. In addition, it was the first single that Moriguchi co-wrote. The song was selected as the theme song of the 1993 edition of the Fuji TV variety show Yume ga Mori Mori. Moriguchi performed the song on the 44th Kōhaku Uta Gassen that year.

The single peaked at No. 10 on Oricon's singles chart, becoming Moriguchi's second top-10 single. She did not return to the top-10 until 2022, when "Ubugoe" also peaked at No. 10.

== Track listing ==
All music is composed and arranged by Kaori Okui.

8 cm CD single
No.	Title	Lyrics	Length
1.	"Whistle" (Hoissuru (ホイッスル))	Hiroko Moriguchi; Yui Nishiwaki
2.	"Sora kara no Tegami" ((空からの手紙; "A Letter from the Sky"))	Nishiwaki
3.	"Whistle (Original Karaoke)" ((ホイッスル(オリジナル・カラオケ)))

== Chart position ==
Chart (1993)	Peak position
Japan Oricon Singles Chart	10
