= Gundam Song Covers =

Studio album by Hiroko Moriguchi
- Released: August 7, 2019
- Recorded: 2015–2019
- Studios: Bellwood Records; Dutchmama Studio; King Sekiguchidai Studio; Sound Inn Studio; Victor Studio
- Genres: J-pop; jazz; anison
- Length: 54:34
- Language: Japanese
- Label: King Records
- Producer: Daisuke Sohkawa

Hiroko Moriguchi chronology
Perfect Best (2013)	Gundam Song Covers (2019)	Gundam Song Covers 2 (2020)

Alternative cover

Music video
- Gundam Song Covers all songs digest on YouTube

Gundam Song Covers is a cover album by Hiroko Moriguchi, released on August 7, 2019, to commemorate the 40th anniversary of the Gundam franchise. The album features Moriguchi's versions of the 10 most popular Gundam songs, as voted on NHK's "Announcement! All Gundam Big Vote" (発表!全ガンダム大投票, Happyō! Zen Gandamu Dai Tōhyō). Her song "Sora no Kanata de" from Mobile Suit Gundam: The Origin is also included as a bonus track. It was released in two physical CD versions: a regular release and a limited edition release with an LP-sized jacket with a booklet and stickers. The album cover, illustrated by Tsukasa Kotobuki, features Moriguchi dressed in an A.E.U.G normal suit, with the MSZ-006 Zeta Gundam in the background.

To promote the album, Moriguchi released the music video for "Mizu no Hoshi e Ai wo Komete" in July 2019.

Upon its release, Gundam Song Covers sold over 25,000 copies, peaked at No. 3 on Oricon's Weekly Album Chart on August 19, 2019, and charted for 57 weeks, making it Moriguchi's highest-charting album in her career until Gundam Song Covers 2 hit No. 2 a year later. It was also her first top-10 album since Eternal Songs in 1991. As of September 16, 2020, the album has sold over 130,000 copies. The album was one of six recipients of the Planning Award at the 61st Japan Record Awards.

== Track listing ==
All tracks are arranged by Kōichirō Tokinori, except 1 by Naoki Kitajima, 2 by Kotaro Oshio, 5 by Saburō Tanooka, 6 by Satoru Shionoya, 7 by Ino Hidefumi, 10 by Kentarō Akutsu, and 11 by Takayuki Hattori.

No.	Title	Lyrics	Music	Original series	Length
1.	"Mizu no Hoshi e Ai wo Komete (水の星へ愛をこめて; From the Aqueous Star with Love)" (with Naoko Terai)	Masao Urino	Neil Sedaka	Mobile Suit Zeta Gundam	4:37
2.	"Ai Senshi (哀 戦士; Soldiers of Sorrow) (with Kotaro Oshio)"	Rin Iogi	Daisuke Inoue	Mobile Suit Gundam II: Soldiers of Sorrow	3:55
3.	"Eternal Wind ~Hohoemi wa Hikaru Kaze no Naka~ (ETERNAL WIND～ほほえみは光る風の中～; Eternal Wind ~Smile in the Shining Wind~)"	Yui Nishiwaki	Nishiwaki; Yoko Orihara	Mobile Suit Gundam F91	5:13
4.	"Beyond the Time ~Möbius no Sora wo Koete~ (BEYOND THE TIME ～メビウスの宇宙を越えて～, BEYOND THE TIME ~Mebiusu no Sora o Koete~; Beyond the Time ~Beyond the Möbius Universe~)"	Mitsuko Komuro	Tetsuya Komuro	Mobile Suit Gundam: Char's Counterattack	5:12
5.	"Arashi no Naka de Kagayaite (嵐の中で輝いて; Shine in the Storm)" (with Saburo Tanooka)	Natsumi Watanabe	Maoto Yumeno	Mobile Suit Gundam: The 08th MS Team	4:41
6.	"Freesia (フリージア, Furījia)" (with Satoru Shionoya)	Uru	Naoaki Iwami	Mobile Suit Gundam: Iron-Blooded Orphans	5:58
7.	"Just Communication" (with Ino Hidefumi)	Shiina Nagano	Kōji Makaino	Mobile Suit Gundam Wing	4:51
8.	"Meguriai (めぐりあい; Encounters)"	Iogi; Urino	Inoue	Mobile Suit Gundam III: Encounters in Space	4:21
9.	"Zeta – Toki wo Koete (Z・刻をこえて; Zeta – Transcending Times)"	Sedaka; Iogi	Sedaka	Mobile Suit Zeta Gundam	3:54
10.	"Re: I Am" (with Tsukemen)	Hiroyuki Sawano	Sawano	Mobile Suit Gundam Unicorn	6:15
11.	"Sora no Kanata de (宇宙の彼方で; On the Other Side of Space) (Bonus Track)"	Yukinojo Mori	Takayuki Hattori	Mobile Suit Gundam: The Origin	5:33
Total length:					54:34

== Personnel ==
- Naoko Terai – violin (track 1)
- Kotaro Oshio – acoustic guitar (track 2)
- Saburo Tanooka – accordion (track 5)
- Satoru Shionoya – piano (track 6)
- Ino Hidefumi – Fender Rhodes & all instruments (track 7)
- Tairiku (of Tsukemen) – viola (track 10)
- Suguru (of Tsukumen) – piano (track 10)
- Kenta (of Tsukemen) – violin (track 10)

== Charts ==
Chart (2019)	Peak position
Oricon Japanese Albums	3
Oricon Anime Albums	1
Billboard Japan Hot Albums	5
Billboard Japan Top Albums Sales	4

== Sequel ==
On January 23, 2020, Moriguchi and King Records announced that Gundam Song Covers 2 was being planned for a 2020 release. Fans had until February 16 to vote for which Gundam songs Moriguchi should cover on the new album. The official poll results were broadcast on the official Gundam YouTube channel on March 8, 2020. The album was originally planned for release on June 10, 2020, but due to the ongoing COVID-19 pandemic, the release date was pushed to September 16, 2020.
