= Yu Hayami =

Japanese singer and television personality (born 1966)

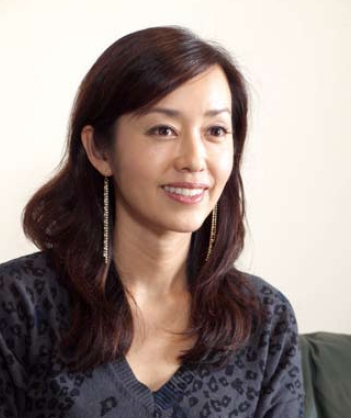
- Hayami in 2010
- Born: September 2, 1966 (age 59); Atami, Shizuoka, Japan
- Education: Sophia University
- Occupations: TV personality; singer; actress; YouTuber
- Children: 2

YouTube information
- Channel: Yu Hayami Channel
- Years active: 2021 -
- Subscribers: 22.6 thousand
- Views: 3.87 million
- Musical career
- Genres: Kayokyoku, J-pop
- Instruments: Vocals
- Years active: 1982–present
- Labels: Taurus Records; EMI Music Japan; Avex
- Last updated: 28 January 2025

Yu Hayami (Japanese: 早見 優, Hepburn: Hayami Yū; born 2 September 1966) is a Japanese singer and television personality. In 2011, the Japanese music television program Music Station listed her as the 50th all-time best-selling idol in Japan, with 2,850,000 records sold.

== Childhood and education ==
Hayami was born in Atami, Shizuoka, and was raised in Guam and Hawaii from the age of 3 to 14 years old. She was scouted by an agent at the age of 14 and soon moved back to Japan to start her career as a singer. After graduating from Horikoshi High School in 1986, she entered Sophia University and graduated, receiving a bachelor's degree in Comparative Culture.

== Career ==
In 1982, Hayami gained her J-pop singer's debut with the single "Isoide Hatsukoi" (ASAP, my first love!) after being scouted by a talent agent in a shopping mall's elevator in Hawaii in 1980 when she was only 14 years old. Named "Bilingual girl back from Hawaii" due to her ability to speak very fluent English because of her background, Hayami was instantly recognised and touted as one of the best newcomers to watch out for. She proceeded to win most of the major newcomers' awards by end of 1982.

She gained her first acting role in the 1982 film Santō Kōkōsei. Up till 2008, Hayami has appeared in 13 movies, including one produced and filmed entirely in Hong Kong in 1987.

In 1983, her fifth single, "Natsu Iro no Nancy" (Summer Coloured Nancy), was selected as a campaign song for a Coca-Cola commercial, and she became a cover girl of that. The single became Hayami's first big hit, making it to the top 10 of the Oricon Chart, winning countless awards. As a result of the success of the song, Hayami made her first appearance at the 34th edition of the year end NHK Red and White Song Festival. Hayami would later participate in that prestigious show for two more years.

In 1985, in order to shed off her "teen idol" image, Hayami began releasing euro beat dance music, and was well received.

In the early 1990s, when her pop music career began to decline, Hayami shifted her focus to become an actress and TV and radio presenter. Being able to speak fluent English, Hayami's hosted programs were all catered to English-speaking education materials and were all very popular. Hayami has continued her successful presenter's work, and can still be regularly seen on entertainment variety programs singing her signature songs from the early stage of her idol career.

In 2005, Hayami, along with Iyo Matsumoto and Chiemi Hori (all of whom debuted in 1982), formed the unit Cutie☆Mommy. They released a para para version of the Mickey Mouse March, which had significant success (ranking 72nd on the Oricon charts). It was featured in the Just Dance Wii 2 game for the Wii, and was also used on segments on the Disney Channel in the US.

Aside from releasing numerous hit singles and albums, Hayami has been very active in theater and in TV and films as well. In 2008, she starred as the Captain General in the Tokusatsu series Tomica Hero: Rescue Force.

Hayami is a co-host alongside Master Chef Tatsuo Saito on the NHK program Dining with the Chef, which airs internationally on NHK World. Together, they present the basics and importance of Japanese cuisine.

In 2017, the unit Cutie☆Mommy was renewed, this time with Hiroko Moriguchi replacing Chiemi Hori, and was renamed Cutie☆MoriMori. In February 2024, the unit released a new single, entitled "Soro Soro Fuyu desu nee" (It's almost winter, isn't it?), produced by Noritake Kinashi and written by George Tokoro. The single was billed to each singer individually (particularly on streaming sites such as RecoChoku and Apple Music).

Hayami proudly celebrated her 40th debut anniversary in 2022, by releasing a compilation album of her hit singles, as well as songs that have never been released in "Affection~Yu Hayami's 40th Anniversary album" in October 2022. She also held a live performance at Shibuya's Pleasure Pleasure in 2023. She has since steadily released new songs and is in collaboration with DJ Night Tempo.

== Personal life ==
Hayami is married and has two daughters.

== Discography ==
=== Singles ===
List of singles, with selected chart positions
Year	Single	Peak chart positions	Formats
Year	Single	JPN Physical	Formats
1982	"Isoide! Hatsukoi" （急いで!初恋）	36	CD, LP, Cassette, digital download, streaming
1982	"Love Light"	38	CD, LP, Cassette, digital download, streaming
1982	"Answer Song wa Aishuu" (アンサーソングは哀愁)	38	CD, LP, Cassette, digital download, streaming
1983	"Ano Koro ni Mou Ichido" （あの頃にもう一度）	27	CD, LP, Cassette, digital download, streaming
1983	"Natsuiro no Nancy" （夏色のナンシー）	7	CD, LP, Cassette, digital download, streaming
1983	"Nagisa no Lion" （渚のライオン）	10	CD, LP, Cassette, digital download, streaming
1983	"Lucky Lips" （ラッキィ・リップス）	10	CD, LP, Cassette, digital download, streaming
1983	"Daite My Love" （抱いてマイ・ラブ）	13	CD, LP, Cassette, digital download, streaming
1984	"Yuuwaku Kousen Kuraa!" （誘惑光線・クラッ!）	7	CD, LP, Cassette, digital download, streaming
1984	"Me☆Sailor Man" （Me☆セーラーマン）	9	CD, LP, Cassette, digital download, streaming
1984	"Aishuu Jyouku" （哀愁情句）	8	CD, LP, Cassette, digital download, streaming
1985	"Tonight"	9	CD, LP, Cassette, digital download, streaming
1985	"Stand Up"	10	CD, LP, Cassette, digital download, streaming
1985	"Passion"	10	CD, LP, Cassette, digital download, streaming
1985	"Clash"	12	CD, LP, Cassette, digital download, streaming
1986	"Seireki 1986" (西暦1986)	15	CD, LP, Cassette, digital download, streaming
1986	"NEWS ni Naranai Koi" (NEWSにならない恋)	9	CD, LP, Cassette, digital download, streaming
1986	"Love Station"	12	CD, LP, Cassette, digital download, streaming
1987	"Heart wa Modoranai" (ハートは戻らない)	15	CD, LP, Cassette, digital download, streaming
1987	"CARIBBEAN NIGHT"	19	CD, LP, Cassette, digital download, streaming
1987	"TOKIO EXPRESS"	18	CD, LP, Cassette, digital download, streaming
1987	"LONELY LIAR"	31	CD, LP, Cassette, digital download, streaming
1988	"GET UP"	36	CD, LP, Cassette, digital download, streaming
1988	"YESTERDAY DREAMER"	81	CD, LP, Cassette, digital download, streaming
1989	"BEAT LOVER"	35	CD, LP, Cassette, digital download, streaming
1989	"Yuubae no Naka de" (夕映えの中で)	84	CD, Cassette, digital download, streaming
1991	"Heaven ni Yoroshiku" (ヘップバーンによろしく)	-	CD, Cassette, digital download, streaming
1992	"Hohoemi Aeru" (ほほ笑みあえる)	-	CD, Cassette, digital download, streaming
1993	"Shooting Star" (released as BANILLA BLU)	-	CD, digital download, streaming
1995	"CHANCE: Meguriai wo, Hōseki ni kaete" (めぐりあいを、宝石にかえて)	86	CD, digital download, streaming
"—" denotes items which did not chart

=== Digital single ===
Year	Single	Reference
2021	"Dear Earth"	
2023	"Shampoo Night Tempo feat. Yu Hayami"	

=== Albums ===
List of albums, with selected chart positions
Title	Album details	Peak positions
Title	Album details	JPN Oricon
And I Love You	Released: 21 June 1982; Label: Taurus Records; Formats: CD, LP, Cassette tape, digital download, streaming	23
Image	Released: 21 November 1982; Label: Taurus Records; Formats: CD, LP, Cassette tape, digital download, streaming	15
Lanai	Released: 1 May 1983; Label: Taurus Records; Formats: CD, LP, Cassette tape, digital download, streaming	5
Colorful Box	Released: 21 November 1983; Label: Taurus Records; Formats: CD, LP, Cassette tape, digital download, streaming	6
Recess	Released: 1 March 1984; Label: Taurus Records; Formats: CD, LP, Cassette tape, digital download, streaming	5
Music	Released: 1 December 1984; Label: Taurus Records; Formats: CD, LP, Cassette tape, digital download, streaming	21
WOW!	Released: 1 May 1985; Label: Taurus Records; Formats: CD, LP, Cassette tape, digital download, streaming	18
Twin	Released: 30 November 1985; Label: Taurus Records; Formats: CD, LP, Cassette tape, digital download, streaming	29
Burning Illusion	Released: 22 May 1986; Label: Taurus Records; Formats: CD, LP, Cassette tape, digital download, streaming	29
Shadows of the Night	Released: 29 November 1986; Label: Taurus Records; Formats: CD, LP, Cassette tape, digital download, streaming	50
Get Down!	Released: 5 August 1987; Label: Taurus Records; Formats: CD, LP, Cassette tape, digital download, streaming	33
WHO'S GONNA COME?	Released: 25 March 1988; Label: Taurus Records; Formats: CD, LP, Cassette tape, digital download, streaming	58
Moments	Released: 4 December 1988; Label: Taurus Records; Formats: CD, LP, Cassette tape, digital download, streaming	-
"—" denotes items which did not chart

=== Live albums ===
List of live albums, with selected chart positions
Title	Album details	Peak positions
Title	Album details	JPN Oricon
HAPPY SIGN Live! 1984	Released: 30 June 1984; Label: Taurus Records; Formats: CD, LP, Cassette tape, digital download, streaming	26
Exciting You '85 Stand Up	Released: 21 June 1985; Label: Taurus Records; Formats: CD, LP, Cassette tape, digital download, streaming	45

=== EPs ===
List of EPS, with selected chart positions
Title	Album details	Peak positions
Title	Album details	JPN Oricon
Dear	Released: 21 August 1983; Label: Taurus Records; Formats: CD, LP, Cassette tape, digital download, streaming	7
Sincerely	Released: 2 September 1984; Label: Taurus Records; Formats: CD, LP, Cassette tape, digital download, streaming	9
YŪ	Released: 1 February 1986; Label: Taurus Records; Formats: CD, LP, Cassette tape, digital download, streaming	15
Delicacy of Love	Released: 25 August 2016; Label: Slenderie Records; Formats: CD, digital download, streaming	66

=== Compilation albums ===
List of compilation albums, with selected chart positions
Title	Album details	Peak positions
Title	Album details	JPN Oricon
You Best	Released: 1 November 1984; Label: Taurus Records; Formats: CD, LP, Cassette tape, digital download, streaming	7
Kids	Released: 31 August 1985; Label: Taurus Records; Formats: CD, LP, Cassette tape, digital download, streaming	7
You Best '85	Released: 28 September 1985; Label: Taurus Records; Formats: CD, LP, Cassette tape, digital download, streaming	17
YU "SINGLE A" BEST COLLECTION	Released: 20 December 1985; Label: Taurus Records; Formats: CD, LP, Cassette tape, digital download, streaming	7
YŪ's BEAT	Released: 28 November 1987; Label: Taurus Records; Formats: CD, LP, Cassette tape, digital download, streaming	63
YŪ's BEST	Released: 8 April 1989; Label: Taurus Records; Formats: CD, LP, Cassette tape, digital download, streaming	7
YŪ's GOODS	Released: 6 December 1989; Label: Taurus Records; Formats: CD, Cassette tape, digital download, streaming	49
SINCE 1982 MAIDEN VOYAGE: Best of Yu	Released: 7 March 1990; Label: Taurus Records; Formats: CD, Cassette tape, digital download, streaming	7
Hayami no American Kids	Released: 16 December 1992; Label: Taurus Records; Formats: CD, Cassette tape, digital download, streaming	-
Yu "Single A" Best Collection	Released: 25 November 1995; Label: Polydor Records; Formats: CD, digital download, streaming	-
Golden Best Yu Hayami Kyōhei Tsutsumi Pops Best	Released: 25 November 2003; Label: Universal Music Japan; Formats: CD, digital download, streaming	-
Idol Revival Greatest Hits Yu Hayami	Released: 17 January 2007; Label: Universal Music Japan; Formats: CD, digital download, streaming	-
Thank YU: 30th Anniversary Single Best	Released: 28 March 2012; Label: Universal Music Japan; Formats: CD, digital download, streaming	-
Golden Idol Yu Hayami	Released: 28 March 2014; Label: Universal Music Japan; Formats: CD, digital download, streaming	-
35th Anniversary Celebration: From Yu to You	Released: 18 April 2018; Label: Universal Music Japan; Formats: CD, digital download, streaming	152
Affection: Yu Hayami 40th Anniversary Compilation	Released: 22 October 2022; Label: Universal Music Japan; Formats: CD, digital download, streaming	75
"—" denotes items which did not chart

=== Box sets ===
List of box sets, with selected chart positions
Title	Album details	Peak positions
Title	Album details	JPN Oricon
82-85 BOKURA NO BEST YU HAYAMI CD-BOX	Released: 17 October 2002; Label: Pony Canyon; Formats: CD, LP, Cassette tape, digital download, streaming	-
Thank YU: 30th Anniversary Special Box	Released: 18 April 2012; Label: Universal Music Japan; Formats: CD, LP, Cassette tape, digital download, streaming	164
"—" denotes items which did not chart

=== Other appearances ===
List of non-studio album or guest appearances that feature Yu Hayami
Title	Year	Artist	Album/Single
"Right Here Right Now"	2020	Takashi Fujii	SLENDERIE ideal
