= Mobile Suit Gundam F91 =

- Japanese film poster
- Directed by: Yoshiyuki Tomino
- Screenplay by: Tsunehisa Ito; Yoshiyuki Tomino
- Based on: Gundam by Hajime Yatate and Yoshiyuki Tomino
- Starring: Kōji Tsujitani; Masaki Maeda; Yumi Tōma
- Music by: Satoshi Kadokura
- Production company: Sunrise
- Distributed by: Shochiku
- Release date: March 16, 1991
- Running time: 115 minutes
- Country: Japan
- Language: Japanese

Mobile Suit Gundam F91 (Japanese: 機動戦士ガンダムF91(フォーミュラ ナインティワン), Hepburn: Kidō Senshi Gandamu Fōmyura Nainti Wan, Mobile Suit Gundam Formula 91) is a 1991 anime film. It was Gundam creator Yoshiyuki Tomino's attempt to launch a new Gundam saga, set 30 years after Char's Counterattack (1988). He re-teamed with character designer Yoshikazu Yasuhiko and mecha designer Kunio Okawara for the occasion.

The film was first released in Japan on March 16, 1991.

== Plot ==
The film is set 30 years after the events of Mobile Suit Gundam: Char's Counterattack and features an all-new cast of characters.

In the year UC 0123, the military arm of Cosmo Babylonia, the Crossbone Vanguard, attacks the Earth Federation colony Frontier IV. Student mechanic Seabook Arno and his friend Cecily Fairchild are caught in the middle of the fighting as the Federation garrison is quickly overwhelmed. Seabook and Cecily lead a group of refugees into the lower levels of the colony, where they meet up with Seabook's father, Leslie. As the group boards a lifeboat, Seabook catches sight of Cecily's father, Theo, attempting to abduct her and tries to intervene. However, the Crossbone Vanguard arrives and takes Cecily, who is actually Berah Ronah, part of the Ronah family who are the leaders behind Cosmo Babylonia. Seabook is forced to retreat to the lifeboat while Leslie stays behind to help a lost child.

Cecily is taken to meet her real father, Carozzo, and grandfather, Meitzer, who both dream of overthrowing the corrupt Earth Federation and replacing it with a more just aristocracy. Cecily is reluctant to join them, but feels she has no choice. Meanwhile, the lifeboat manages to reach the neighboring colony Frontier I, but it is also under attack by the Crossbone Vanguard. Seabook's group then comes across the Space Ark, a Federation training ship carrying the inoperative Gundam F91. Due to the confusion caused by the Crossbone Vanguard's surprise attack, the Space Ark is run by a barely experienced skeleton crew with no available pilots. Pressed into Federation service, Seabook works on repairing the F91 and discovers it was developed by his mother, Monica. The crew is able to repair the F91 just in time to repel an assault by the Crossbone Vanguard, forcing them to retreat.

Seabook then uses the F91 to return to Frontier IV, where Cosmo Babylonia has already repaired most of the damage to the colony and has fully occupied it. He infiltrates the Ronah estate and makes contact with Cecily. However, he is forced to flee without her when the guards pursue him. Leslie helps Seabook escape Frontier IV, but he suffers a mortal head injury in the process and dies on the return trip to Frontier I. Cecily joins the Crossbone Vanguard under Zabine Chareux's command. He helps train Cecily to be a mobile suit pilot and warns her that there are several factions within Cosmo Babylonia working against each other's interests, with one faction working on a secret superweapon codenamed "Bug". Seabook returns to Frontier I, where he is again forced by the Federation to help defend the colony against an impending attack by the Crossbone Vanguard. Instead, Seabook and the crew of the Space Ark secretly decide to desert and flee to the Moon.

Cecily is assigned the advanced Vigna Ghina mobile suit and accompanies the Crossbone Vanguard as they break into Frontier I. After a brief but intense skirmish, the Crossbone Vanguard are once again forced to withdraw. Seabook encounters Cecily in battle and she decides to defect upon discovering her friends are still alive. Carozzo then arrives at Frontier I and deploys the Bugs, automated war machines designed to specifically hunt down humans. He believes that Earth's population must be purged to preserve its environment, and intends to use Frontier I as a testing ground for the Bugs. Seabook and Cecily work together to destroy the Bugs, with Cecily destroying their mothership. Angered, Carozzo deploys in his own mobile armor, the Rafflesia, and battles Seabook and Cecily. The Vigna Ghina is destroyed, ejecting Cecily into space, and Seabook destroys the Rafflesia in response. Zabine arrives on the scene, but decides to spare Seabook and the Space Ark due to his disagreement over Carozzo's use of the Bugs and Rafflesia. After a desperate search, Seabook is able to find and rescue Cecily as the Space Ark arrives to pick them up.

== Voice cast ==
Character	Voice actors	
Character	Japanese	English
Seabook Arno	Kouji Tsujitani	Steve Staley
Carozzo "Iron Mask" Ronah	Masaki Maeda	Tom Wyner
Cecily Fairchild / Berah Ronah	Yumi Touma	Michelle Ruff
Annamarie Bourget	Chie Koujiro	Kari Wahlgren
Zabine Chareux	Kiyoyuki Yanada	Jamieson Price
Leahlee Edaberry	Mari Yoko	Mari Devon
Reese Arno	Sayuri Ikemoto	Julie Maddalena
Dorel Ronah	Takeshi Kusao	Dave Wittenberg
Meitzer Ronah	Teppei Takasugi	Simon Prescott
Leslie Arno	Mikio Terashima	Tony Pope
Monica Arno	Miyoko Shoji	Julie Ann Taylor
Cosmo Eigesse	Takeshi Watabe	Bob Papenbrook
Theo Fairchild	Tamio Ōki	Michael Forest
Birgit Pirjo	Yoku Shioya	Derek Stephen Prince
Dwight Camry	Takehito Koyasu	Peter Doyle
Arthur Jung	Taiki Matsuno	Joshua Seth

== Development ==
Originally planned as a full-length television series to mark the tenth anniversary of the Gundam franchise, Gundam F91 hit a production snag due to staff disputes, and the project was stopped after the screenplays for the first thirteen episodes were written. It was then decided that what was made of the show would be condensed into a theatrical feature film.

A film adaptation in the Gundam franchise had not been created since Char's Counterattack. Gundam F91 was developed with the goal of presenting a new era and new characters, at a time when SD Gundam was the representative of Gundam in film theaters. Tomino commented apart from the actual announcement of the work that the theme of the film would involve family matters.

Yoshikazu Yasuhiko and Kunio Okawara returned to work on the film with Tomino to recreate the core team from the original Mobile Suit Gundam series. Yasuhiko hadn't done anything aside from character designs after Mobile Suit Gundam, but he participated on the condition that he would get to help create the story like he did in the original. In the end, however, he did not participate in the story's development, and instead arranged parts of the animation and designed and colored some elements, such as the normal suits (the space suits used in the film). Okawara returned from his design role in Mobile Suit Gundam ZZ to design every mobile suit that appeared in the film. The mobile suits he designed were ones that came from conversations with Tomino, much like how it was when they worked on the original series, but they found themselves disagreeing on how radically to change the design elements and theme. Okawara originally took care to keep the number of lines in his designs to a minimum, as the difficulty of animating them for a feature-length film would increase, but Sunrise requested that he use as many lines as he could.

The mobile suits for the film were designed to be smaller than usual—their sizes had been generally increasing up until Char's Counterattack, where the Gundam was 18 meters tall but the Nu Gundam was 22 meters. The average size was brought down to about fifteen meters in Gundam F91, with Tomino explaining that it would be easier for when the mobile suits were made into model kits, as they would be more easily posed with equally scaled human figures and easier to build dioramas around, the same reason he offered for another animation series he worked on, Aura Battler Dunbine. Tomino originally wanted to decrease the size to 10 meters, but it was set at 15 meters to meet the requirements of manufacturers.

In-universe, the shortening of mobile suits was explained as a way to combat the ever-growing costs of producing larger and larger mobile suits. In the same way, the model kits would also decrease in terms of manufacturing cost. In reality, however, as 1/144 scale model kits were becoming the norm instead of 1/100, the cost to develop new technology to color smaller kits and to create smaller, more articulated joints, among other things, actually drove the production cost up. However, this in-universe explanation met with dissatisfaction by fans of the franchise, especially the model kit fans, so after retaining the smaller size through Mobile Suit Victory Gundam, starting with Mobile Fighter G Gundam the mobile suits were gradually increased in size once again. By the release of Turn-A Gundam and G-Saviour, the titular mobile suits stood at 20 and 18 meters, respectively.

According to Tomino, the film was designed to be easier to understand than the somewhat confusing Char's Counterattack. The main character was a more easily understood hero, and the story ended on a happier note. The theme of Char's Counterattack involved Newtypes, but Gundam F91 chose to go with the easily relatable concept of "family problems" as its main focus, which also made it easier to understand for newer fans of the series. As a result, Tomino has said that "story-wise, the movie was a success." The first part of the film was presented in a clean, understandable way, but the second part got more chaotic, like Char's Counterattack, with situations only being explained with very brief dialogue – the layers of complicated story piled up, and in that sense it became a true successor to the Gundam film adaptations.

In the story, round, floating manslaughter weapons called "Bugs" were introduced in order to give more of a direct feel to the pain and violence depicted on screen than the poison gas used in Mobile Suit Gundam and Mobile Suit Zeta Gundam, though they had the same role of killing people. This is related to Tomino's strong belief at the time that children were "continuing to lose touch with real life."

Gundam F91 was Sunrise's first film that used wide-screen format materials for its production. Until then, all of Sunrise's film productions had used normal-sized paper, which was then cut off at the top and bottom in order to adapt it to widescreen.

== Release ==
After the film's release, the first six of eight of its film rolls smoothed out certain scenes, and about five minutes of footage was added to the last two rolls. They also had the voice actors re-dub the film, and finally released the "director's cut" on VHS as "Mobile Suit Gundam F91: The Complete Version". The later DVD release contained both the original film version and the complete version. However, rolls 1 through 6 on the film version are actually from the revised, complete version, so the original film version has never actually been released on home video.

== Theme songs ==
Ending:

- "Eternal Wind ~ Hohoemi wa Hikaru Kaze no Naka" (ETERNAL WIND〜ほほえみは光る風の中〜; "Eternal Wind ~Shine in the Smiling Wind") by Hiroko Moriguchi

Insert: (This song wasn't used in the movie itself, but it was present on an extended trailer for the movie).

- "Kimi wo Mitsumete -The Time I'm Seeing You-" (君を見つめて -The time I'm seeing you-; "Staring at You -The time I'm seeing you") by Hiroko Moriguchi

== Reception ==
In a NHK 2023 survey, respondents have rated F91 as the 18th most popular Gundam property.

== Legacy ==
In production notes it was said that they would "certainly" continue with a sequel to Gundam F91, but a project for a continuation never materialized. Later on, however, Tomino was involved with the writing of the manga Mobile Suit Crossbone Gundam, which followed the film's events to a certain extent.

== Media ==
=== Novels ===
Film director and writer Tomino wrote a two-part novelization that fleshed out more details of the story.

No.	Title	Author	Publisher	Date	ISBN
1	Mobile Suit Gundam F91 Crossbone Vanguard (first) (機動戦士ガンダムF91 クロスボーン・バンガード（上）)	Yoshiyuki Tomino	Kadokawa Shoten	29 January 1991	9784044101343
2	Mobile Suit Gundam F91 Crossbone Vanguard (final) (機動戦士ガンダムF91 クロスボーン・バンガード（下）)	Yoshiyuki Tomino	Kadokawa Shoten	21 February 1991	9784044101350

=== Video games ===
Gundam F91 has appeared in other games. The film was in Super Robot Wars II, III, EX, IV, F/Final, Alpha, Alpha 2, Compact, Impact, 64, X and X-Ω.

Preceded by Mobile Suit Gundam 0080: War in the Pocket	Gundam metaseries (production order); 1991	Succeeded by Mobile Suit Gundam 0083: Stardust Memory
Preceded by Mobile Suit Gundam: Hathaway's Flash	Gundam Universal Century timeline U.C. 0123	Succeeded by Mobile Suit Crossbone Gundam (manga); Mobile Suit Victory Gundam
