= Speed (Hiroko Moriguchi song) =

Single by Hiroko Moriguchi

from the album Issho ni Aruite Ikeru
- Language: Japanese
- B-side: "Mado Utsu Ame"
- Released: September 24, 1992
- Recorded: 1992
- Genre: J-pop; pop rock
- Label: King Records
- Songwriters: Yui Nishiwaki; Kaori Okui
- Producer: Kaori Okui

Hiroko Moriguchi singles chronology
"Yume ga Mori Mori" (1992)	"Speed" (1992)	"Whistle" (1993)

"Speed" (スピード, Supīdo) is the 12th single by Japanese singer Hiroko Moriguchi. Written by Yui Nishiwaki and Kaori Okui, the single was released on September 24, 1992 under King Records.

== Background and release ==
"Speed" was Moriguchi's first collaboration with Princess Princess lead vocalist/songwriter Kaori Okui. It was selected as the theme song of the "Super Kick Base" portion of the Fuji TV variety show Yume ga Mori Mori. Moriguchi performed the song on the 43rd Kōhaku Uta Gassen that year.

The B-side is "Mado Utsu Ame", which was later covered by Kaori Kishitani on her 2015 single "Dream".

The single peaked at No. 15 on Oricon's singles chart.

== Track listing ==
All music is composed by Kaori Okui; all music is arranged by Kaori Okui and Nobuhiko Kashiwara, except where indicated.

8 cm CD single
No.	Title	Lyrics	Arrangement	Length
1.	"Speed" (Supīdo (スピード))	Yui Nishiwaki
2.	"Mado Utsu Ame" ((窓打つ雨; "Rain Hitting the Window"))	Yasuharu Konishi
3.	"Speed (Original Karaoke)" ((スピード(オリジナル・カラオケ)))
4.	"Mado Utsu Ame (March Version)" ((窓打つ雨 (マーチ・バージョン)))		The Mori Mori Band

== Charts ==
Chart (1992)	Peak position
Japan Oricon Singles Chart	15
