= Mikio Sakai =

Japanese singer-songwriter

Mikio Sakai (酒井ミキオ, Sakai Mikio; born August 24, 1970 in Hokkaidō) is a Japanese singer-songwriter. His real name is Mikirō Sakai (酒井幹郎, Sakai Mikirō). He made his debut with the single Ima dake wa Kimi wo Hanasanai (今だけは君を離さない).

He has composed, written and performed numerous songs for several anime, including Fantastic Children, Tsubasa Chronicle, the Gorō Taniguchi-directed Sunrise productions, Planetes, s-CRY-ed, Code Geass, Date A Live, and Chivalry of a Failed Knight, as well as various other media.

== Discography ==
=== Singles ===
Toy's Factory

- Ima dake wa Kimi wo Hanasanai (今だけは君を離さない)

Released February 9, 1994

- Taisetsu na Kimi Heto (大切な君へと)

Released October 1, 1994

- something

Released May 10, 1995

- Zutto Zutto Dakishimetai (ずっとずっと抱きしめたい)

Released February 1, 1996

- Dear

Released June 1, 1996

- Soshite Kimi ha Jiyū ni Naru (そして君は自由になる)

Released November 1, 1996

- Regrets

Released June 1, 1997

Victor Entertainment

- Drastic my soul

Released August 22, 2001
Ending & opening theme to the anime s-CRY-ed

- Dive in the sky

Released November 21, 2003
Opening and ending themes to the anime Planetes

- Save the World

Ending theme for the anime adaptation of Date A Live

=== Albums ===
Toys Factory

- In Vogue

Released March 1, 1994

- scene

Released November 2, 1994

- Pieces

Released April 1, 1996

- Little Flowers

Released December 1, 1997

- my souls

Released March 28, 2012

=== Other ===
- Anime s-CRY-ed O.S.T.2

November 21, 2001
Performance of the insert songs Tabidachi no Kane ga Naru (旅立ちの鐘が鳴る) and Discovery

- Anime Planetes O.S.T.2

March 24, 2004
Performance of the insert song: Thanks my friend
