= Eternal Wind =

"Eternal Wind (Hohoemi wa Hikaru Kaze no Naka)"

Single by Hiroko Moriguchi

from the album Eternal Songs
- Language: Japanese
- English title: Eternal Wind (Smile in the Shining Wind)
- B-side: "Kimi wo Mitsumete -The Time I'm Seeing You-"
- Released: February 5, 1991
- Recorded: 1990
- Genre: J-pop; anison
- Length: 4:43
- Label: Starchild
- Songwriters: Yui Nishiwaki; Yoko Orihara

Hiroko Moriguchi singles chronology
| "Koi wa Tahiti de Are-Are-A!" (1990) | "Eternal Wind (Hohoemi wa Hikaru Kaze no Naka)" (1991) | "Yasashī Hoshi de" (1991) |

Music videos
- "Eternal Wind" on YouTube
- "Kimi wo Mitsumete -The Time I'm Seeing You" on YouTube

"Eternal Wind (Hohoemi wa Hikaru Kaze no Naka)" (ETERNAL WIND〜ほほえみは光る風の中〜; lit. "Eternal Wind ~Shine in the Smiling Wind") is the ninth single by Japanese singer Hiroko Moriguchi, released on February 5, 1991, under Starchild Records. Written by Yui Nishiwaki and Yoko Orihara, the song was used as the ending theme of the 1991 mecha anime film Mobile Suit Gundam F91. The single peaked at No. 9 on Oricon's singles charts and landed at No. 47 on Oricon's 1991 year-ending chart, making it Moriguchi's best-selling single. It was also certified Gold by the RIAJ. In addition, the song led to her debut on NHK's Kōhaku Uta Gassen that year.

In 2018, the song was ranked No. 3 on NHK's "Announcement! All Gundam Big Vote" (発表!全ガンダム大投票, Happyō! Zen Gandamu Dai Tōhyō). Moriguchi re-recorded the song in 2015 for her 30th anniversary single "I Wish (Kimi ga Iru Konomachi de) (I wish〜君がいるこの街で〜; "I Wish ~In This Town Where You Are~")"; this version is featured in the 2019 album Gundam Song Covers. "Kimi wo Mitsumete -The Time I'm Seeing You-", the B-side, was ranked No. 3 on a 2020 poll hosted by King Records and was re-recorded by Moriguchi for the album Gundam Song Covers 2. An orchestral version of "Eternal Wind" is included on the 2025 album Gundam Song Covers: Orchestra. Moriguchi recorded an a cappella version with 40 variations of her voice on the 2025 album Your Flower: Uta no Hanataba wo as part of her 40th anniversary celebration.

In 2019, the song was awarded the Movie Theme Song Award (映画主題歌賞, Eiga Shudaika-shō) for the years 1989 to 1999 at Sony Music Entertainment Japan's Heisei Anison Awards (平成アニソン大賞, Heisei Anison Taishō).

== Track listing ==
All music is arranged by Satoshi Kadokura.

| No. | Title | Lyrics | Music | Length |
|---|---|---|---|---|
| 1. | "Eternal Wind (Hohoemi wa Hikaru Kaze no Naka)" ((ETERNAL WIND〜ほほえみは光る風の中〜; "Eternal Wind ~Shine in the Smiling Wind")) | Yui Nishiwaki | Nishiwaki; Yoko Orihara | 4:43 |
| 2. | "Kimi wo Mitsumete -The Time I'm Seeing You-" ((君を見つめて -The time I'm seeing you-; "Staring at You -The time I'm seeing you")) | Rin Iogi; Yasuhiko Shigemura | Shigemura | 4:46 |

== Charts ==
| Chart (1991) | Peak position |
|---|---|
| Japan Oricon Singles Chart | 9 |

== Certification ==
| Region | Certification | Certified units/sales |
|---|---|---|
| Japan (RIAJ) | Gold | 200,000^{^} |
^{^} Shipments figures based on certification alone.

== Cover versions ==
- Mikuni Shimokawa covered the song on her 2003 compilation Review ~Shimokawa Mikuni Seishun Anison Cover Album~ and her 2007 compilation Reprise: Shimokawa Mikuni Anison Best.
- Shoko Nakagawa covered the song on her 2007 album Shokotan Cover Cover: Anison ni Ai o Komete!!.
- Yumi Matsuzawa covered the song on her 2007 album Anicapella.
- Hisayo Mochizuki covered the song on the 2007 Aniplex compilation album Hyakkaseiran: Josei Seiyū-hen.
- Ami Numakura covered the song on the 2009 compilation album THE IDOLM@STER RADIO Uta Dojo.
- Aki Misato covered the song on the 2009 compilation album Gundam Tribute from Lantis.
- Kumi Sakuma and Ryoka Yuzuki covered the song on the 2010 Aniplex compilation album Shin Hyakkaseiran: Josei Seiyū-hen.
- Rasmus Faber covered the song on his 2013 album Rasmus Faber Presents Platinum Jazz-Anime Standard-Vol.4.
- Nami Tamaki covered the song on her 2014 album NT Gundam Cover.
- SawanoHiroyuki[nZk]:Tielle covered the song as a bonus track on the 2016 soundtrack album Mobile Suit Gundam Unicorn RE:0096 Complete Best Limited Edition.
- Lia covered the song on her 2018 album REVIVES -Lia Sings beautiful anime songs-.
- Spira Spica covered the song on their 2019 EP Re:RISE -e.p.-.
