= TMNetwork =

Japanese rock/new wave/pop band

- Also known as: TMN; TM Network
- Origin: Tama, Tokyo, Japan
- Genres: New wave; synthpop; progressive rock
- Years active: 1983–1994; 1996; 1999–2008; 2012–2018; 2021–present
- Labels: Epic; True Kiss; Gaball Screen; Avex
- Members: Tetsuya Komuro; Takashi Utsunomiya; Naoto Kine

TMNetwork is a Japanese rock/new wave/pop musical band, made up by Tetsuya Komuro (keyboardist), Takashi Utsunomiya (vocalist) and Naoto Kine (guitarist). They became popular in Japan as the "futuristic pop songs with synthesizer" after the release of their 1987 single "Get Wild".

Tetsuya Komuro became a famous producer of dance-oriented J-pop singers in 1990s, and as such they are considered a prototype of the J-pop genre. However, their 2000 album Major Turn-Round was influenced by progressive rock.

== History ==
Vocalist Takashi Utsunomiya and guitarist and songwriter Naoto Kine were originally in a band together called Speedway during their school days. Keyboardist and songwriter Tetsuya Komuro would join for a few months before leaving to pursue solo activities. When he sent a demo tape he made to some friends he was encouraged to make new versions of the songs with a full band. In 1983 He contacted Utsunomiya and Kine about working together, and Speedway was abandoned in favor of this new group. They settled on the name TM Network. The name is commonly thought to stand for "Time Machine Network", supported by a statement by Tetsuya Komuro on a 1984 appearance on the show LiveG. However, on September 6, 2006, an episode of Trivia no Izumi claimed that TM actually stands for Tama, the district from Tokyo they all came from.

On August 22, 1983, TM Network took part in the "Fresh Sounds Contest" (フレッシュサウンズコンテスト) which was sponsored by Coca-Cola. They performed the song "1974", and the event was aired on TBS. This was their first step towards a record deal.

They made their record debut with single "Kin'yōbi no Lion (Take It to the Lucky)" (lit. "Friday's lion") and album Rainbow Rainbow on April 21, 1984.

They first became famous in Hokkaido. They later found success with the songs "Self Control", "Get Wild", "Beyond the Time", and others, becoming one of the most popular rock bands in Japan. In particular, in the anime world, "Get Wild", used as the first ending song of City Hunter, sold a combined 525,010 single in Japan. "Get Wild" has received a number of covers by many J-pop bands and singers, as well as Vocaloids. "Beyond the Time" was used as the ending theme the 1988 anime film Mobile Suit Gundam: Char's Counterattack.

Several musicians have supported them at their live shows as backing bands such as Tak Matsumoto (B'z), Daisuke Asakura (Access), and more.

They changed their name to TMN in 1990, and broke up in 1994. In 1996 Komuro and Utsunomiya got Kine to play on a song they did together and included it on a new compilation album. They fully reunited under their original name in 1999 and released three singles. Afterwards they signed with an independent label, Rojam Entertainment, which released the band's ninth album, Major Turn-Round in 2000. In 2004 the band would release their tenth album Easy Listening, which showed Komuro's interest in trance music. Once Komuro had finished touring extensively with globe he got Kine and Utsunomiya back together to make their eleventh album SPEEDWAY in 2007. The band then ceased activities following the fraud allocations against Komuro.

Following Komuro's return to music they resumed working together again. They them signed with avex Entertainment and released their twelfth album Quit30 in 2014. The band continued to tour regularly, but Komuro's withdrawal from public appearances in 2018 following revelations of infidelity to his wife, globe singer Keiko Yamada, once again put an end to the group's activities.

In 2021, the group reunited once more and began performing a series of virtual concerts titled How Do You Crash It? The first concert was streamed on October 9, 2021, the second streamed on December 11, and the third in February the following year. In the summer of 2022, avex released live CDs of all three concerts and a compilation Blu-Ray. The deluxe edition contained the CD single for the studio version of the song "How Crash?", which was performed for the first time during the concerts. Sony Music Japan later announced that their TM Network catalog would become available on all music download services worldwide. Shortly after this the band releases their next single "Please Heal the World" as NFT released exclusively through the messaging service Line.

In 2022 the band announced the "Fanks Intelligence Days" tour, which marked Komuro's first tour since news of his infidelity became public.

They collaborated with musicians such as Julio Iglesias Jr., Sheila E. and Leehom Wang for "Happiness×3 Loneliness×3" in 1999.

== Members ==
- Tetsuya Komuro (小室哲哉 Komuro Tetsuya, born November 27, 1958, in Fuchū, Tokyo) Keyboard, composition, arrangement, lyrics, producer, chorus.
- Takashi Utsunomiya (宇都宮隆 Utsunomiya Takashi, born October 25, 1957) Main vocals, chorus.

He is acting solo singer. And also, as an actor, performed in the musical Rent in Japan.

- Naoto Kine (木根尚登 Kine Naoto, born September 26, 1957) Guitar, composition, piano, harmonica, chorus.

He is acting solo singer-songwriter. And also, as an author, written many novels and other books.

== Video game ==
- TM Network: Live in Power Bowl, released in 1989 for the Famicom
