= Mobile Suit Zeta Gundam =

Japanese anime television series

- 機動戦士Ζガンダム
- Genre: Mecha; Military science fiction Space opera
- Created by: Hajime Yatate (concept); Yoshiyuki Tomino (story)
- Directed by: Yoshiyuki Tomino (chief)
- Music by: Shigeaki Saegusa
- Country of origin: Japan
- Original language: Japanese
- No. of episodes: 50 (list of episodes)

Production
- Producers: Toru Moriyama (Nagoya TV); Kuniaki Ohnishi (Sotsu Agency); Kenji Uchida (Nippon Sunrise)
- Production companies: Nagoya TV; Sotsu Agency; Nippon Sunrise

Original release
- Network: ANN (Nagoya TV, TV Asahi)
- Release: March 2, 1985 – February 22, 1986

Related
Further information
Manga
Written by	Kazuhisa Kondo
Published by	Kodansha
Magazine	Comic BonBon
Original run	March 1985 – February 1986
Volumes	3
Anime film series
Zeta Gundam: A New Translation
Directed by	Yoshiyuki Tomino
Produced by	Keiichi Matsumura; Satoshi Kubo
Written by	Yoshiyuki Tomino
Music by	Shigeaki Saegusa; Gackt
Studio	Sunrise
Licensed by	NA: Sunrise
Released	May 28, 2005 – March 4, 2006
Runtime	95 minutes (each)
Films	3
Manga
Mobile Suit Z Gundam Define
Written by	Hiroyuki Kitazume
Published by	Kadokawa Shoten
Magazine	Gundam Ace
Original run	June 25, 2011 – present
Volumes	21

Mobile Suit Zeta Gundam (Japanese: 機動戦士Ζガンダム, Hepburn: Kidō Senshi Zēta Gandamu) is a 1985 Japanese anime television series, the second installment in the Gundam franchise, and a sequel to the 1979 anime series Mobile Suit Gundam. The show was created and directed by Yoshiyuki Tomino, with character designs by Yoshikazu Yasuhiko, while the series' mechanical designs are split among Kunio Okawara, Mamoru Nagano, and Kazumi Fujita. The series was originally aired on Nagoya Broadcasting Network and its sister ANN stations between 1985 and 1986.

The plot is set in the futuristic "Universal Century" timeline and takes place eight years after the events of the original series. Zeta centers on a new conflict that is formed between two new factions – the Titans, a corrupt task force formed by the Earth Federation, and the Anti-Earth Union Group (AEUG), a rebel group that seeks to end the Titans. The show is told through the perspective of Kamille Bidan, a teenage member of the AEUG and pilot of the RX-178 Gundam Mk-II, and later the MSZ-006 Zeta Gundam. Several main characters from the previous Gundam series return in supporting roles, including Amuro Ray and his rival Char Aznable, the latter of which returns as a pilot for the AEUG under the new identity of Quattro Bajeena.

Often regarded as one of the best shows in the franchise, the series is praised for its dark themes, characters, and its improvements over its predecessor. Between 2005 and 2006, the series was reproduced and compiled into a film trilogy, Mobile Suit Zeta Gundam: A New Translation. Though still directed by Tomino, it involved many changes in the original storyline. The films were considered to be a success in Japan.

== Plot ==
Set in the year Universal Century (UC) 0087, eight years after the events of Mobile Suit Gundam (0079), and four years after the events of Mobile Suit Gundam 0083: Stardust Memory (0083 to 0084) the series follows a rebel group called the Anti-Earth Union Group (AEUG) as they try to defeat the Titans, an elite task force of the Earth Federation designed to hunt down Zeon remnants but which ruthlessly kills anyone demanding equal rights for the space citizens in cold blood.

The story of Zeta Gundam is told through the viewpoint of Kamille Bidan, a civilian teenager and amateur mobile suit pilot whose parents are engineers working for the Earth Federation and the Titans. While traveling to the Green Noa colony to meet his parents, Kamille is insulted by and strikes a Titans officer named Jerid Messa. Following an AEUG attack led by Quattro Bajeena on the colony to capture a trio of Gundam Mk-II mobile suits undergoing field tests, Kamille takes the opportunity to steal Messa's Mk-II to repel the attack and follows Quattro back to the AEUG mothership Argama. The Titans, under the order of Bask Om, take Kamille's parents in an attempt to force the return of the stolen Gundam Mk-IIs. Jerid, unaware of the hostage plot, mistakenly kills Kamille's mother. Because of this, and many other reasons, Kamille eventually joins the AEUG.

As the war escalates, Kamille encounters people from all sides of the conflict, including brainwashed Titans, artificial Newtypes, and the leaders of Anaheim Electronics, who are secretly funding the AEUG. The AEUG eventually launch a full-scale attack on the Earth Federation's assembly at Dakar, leading to an Earth Sphere civil war. Quattro reveals himself to be Char Aznable and presents evidence of the Titans' tyranny including using G3 nerve gas on a defenseless colony. The Earth Federation court soon rules the Titans' actions to be illegal and backs the AEUG in hunting down the Titans' leader Jamitov Hymem.

After losing the support of the Earth Federation, the Titans turn to their original enemy, remnants of the Principality of Zeon now known as the Axis Zeon, to form an alliance to regain control of the Earth Sphere. Axis Zeon's leader Haman Karn contacts the AEUG, using the civil war of the Earth Federation at hand to politically ask for the control of Side 3, the former Zeon colony.

Axis involvement and Jamitov's assassination by Jupiter Fleet commander Paptimus Scirocco soon lead to a battle over the colony headquarters of the Titans, Gryps, which has been modified to be a colony laser. The war ends when Kamille, piloting the titular mobile suit Z Gundam, kills Scirocco in battle and the AEUG sinks Scirocco's flagship and most of the Titans' fleet. As he is dying, Scirocco unleashes a mental attack on Kamille, leaving him mentally unstable with signs of memory lapse or insanity.

The series concludes with both the AEUG and Earth Federation, after suffering considerable losses over the course of the war, facing the full force of Axis Zeon, leading into Mobile Suit Gundam ZZ.

== Production ==
Director Tomino actually started planning for a Gundam sequel in February 1984. The first memo dated February 20 included themes related to staff work, such as "What is missing?/What do you really want to do?" From February to May is a period of trial and error, with the "Zeta Gundam" proposal set in the future U.C.0111 (Triple One) and the "Mobile Suit His Alpha Gundam" proposal set in the past U.C.0045. is written. In the "Zeta Gundam" proposal, there is an idea that goes beyond the Newtype, "Gather Stime", which allows one to gain the mental identity of others. Around the beginning of June, a story line close to its current form began to come together, and since then, it has been refined repeatedly based on it. On August 20, the basic background titled "Situation 7 years later..." and a plot memo for one course will be completed. In November 1984, it was officially announced.

Despite the considerable preparation period for a TV anime, the design decision and commercialization of the main character Z Gundam were delayed due to its complicated design and deformation mechanism. Due to the participation of multiple designers, the actual design work took an unexpectedly long time, and the appearance on the show was delayed until the third cour in the second half. For this reason, the need for a Gundam to play the leading role in the first two courses until the appearance of the Zeta Gundam arose, and the appearance of the Gundam Mk-II was decided. Under the order from Bandai that "Mk-II is a descendant of MSV", from RX-78 Full Armor Gundam and Heavy Gundam. which is downstream of the flow to and was designed with consideration for "movability".

Also, with an offer from Bandai saying, "Since the main Zeta Gundam won't appear until after episode 20, we'd like you to put out an MSV as a bridge between them", it was decided that the MSV, which until then had only been developed as a plastic model, would appear in the main story. In the first place, MSV was originally developed by Bandai because Sunrise was reluctant to make a sequel to Gundam.

In order to train the younger generation, which was one of Director Tomino's requests to "break Gundam's shell" and one of the challenges, the staff ended up with [Yasuhiko Yoshikazu], the character who was responsible for the world view of the previous work. While the mecha designed Kunio Okawara participated, it became a system where young people solidified around him.

For the first time in a Sunrise work, a mechanical animation director was appointed, and Yunhisa Uchida was adopted and credited in the program. Yoshikazu Yasuhiko, the designer of the previous game, was in charge of character design. Work began in September 1984, and based on the plot and memo sentences delivered by director Yoshiyuki Tomino, the design was given priority to the image. However, there were many misunderstandings in this method, and some were redrawn according to their roles after the design was completed. In later years, Yasuhiko said that in the previous work, he had a relationship that could be called a "comrade" with Tomino, but in this work, it changed completely and he only felt bad, and he was able to meet directly and have a meeting without an appointment. In addition, it was decided that Yasuhiko would only work on the design and not the drawing, and the pillar of the actual drawing was the three-dimensional drawing that contrasted with Yasuhiko, who has a soft pattern with nuances. It was Hiroyuki Kitazume who was influenced by Tomoken Kogawa with a solid pattern.

Yoshiyuki Tomino crammed his frustrations into Zeta Gundam. He created the anime with the idea of telling viewers "Hey, watch my new Gundam, youngsters. Why are you not so lively like them in Z?" Tomino has mixed feelings about Zeta Gundam. Tomino did not like the series and believes he should have ended the story in the first TV series. However, at the same time, he noted that thanks to Zeta the franchise became more popular.

=== Soundtrack ===
A majority of the series' background music was written by Japanese composer Shigeaki Saegusa. The melodies of the two opening themes and sole ending theme were written by American pop singer/songwriter Neil Sedaka. The first opening song used is called "Zeta – Toki wo Koete" (Z・刻をこえて, Zeta – Transcending Times) which was performed by Mami Ayukawa, and used for the first twenty-three episodes. "Zeta – Toki wo Koete" was based upon the song "Better Days are Coming" from Sedaka's 1972 album Solitaire. The second opening song used is entitled "Mizu no Hoshi e Ai wo Komete" (水の星へ愛をこめて, From the Aqueous Star with Love) and was performed by Hiroko Moriguchi, this second opening song is used in episodes twenty-four to fifty. The song "Mizu no Hoshi e Ai wo Komete" was derived from an unreleased song entitled "For Us to Decide".

The sole ending song used for the series is called "Hoshizora no Believe" (星空のBelieve, Believe in the Starry Sky) which was sung by Mami Ayukawa. "Hoshizora no Believe" was adapted from the song "Bad and Beautiful" from the 1976 album Steppin' Out. In addition to the opening/ending songs an insert song was also made called "Gin'iro Doresu" (銀色ドレス, Silver Dress). This song is sung by Hiroko Moriguchi and is used in episode twenty.

The opening and ending songs differed for the International release version, as well as Japanese streaming versions, as opposed to the original. The opening song used is called "Zeta no Kodō ~ Zeta Gund"' (Ζの鼓動～Ζガンダム, Zeta's Pulse~Zeta Gundam) which was composed by Saegusa, while the song used for the endings, "Gurīn Noa no Shōnen ~ Arata na Sekai" (グリーン・ノアの少年～新たな世界, Boy from Green Noa ~ A New World), was also written by Saegusa.

The songs used for the three films based on Mobile Suit Zeta Gundam were all performed by Gackt, and were compiled and released on his tribute album 0079-0088. The first film Heirs To The Stars uses two songs; "Metamorphoze" is used as the opening song while "Kimi ga Matteiru Kara" (君が待っているから, Because you're Waiting) is used for the ending. The second film Lovers features the ending song "Mind Forest", which was included on Gackt's album Crescent. The final film made, Love is the Pulse of the Stars, has two songs: "Love Letter" is used as an insert song, followed by the ending song "Dybbuk".

== International release ==
The show has been placed on rerun on the anime satellite television network, Animax, across Japan and later its respective networks worldwide, including East Asia, Southeast Asia, South Asia, and other regions.

In 2004, after almost two years of delays and failed television and merchandising deals, Bandai Entertainment released a limited edition Zeta Gundam boxset with dubbed English and original Japanese audio tracks. The box-set includes pencil sharpener collectibles and a 48-page booklet and poster. The English dub was done by Ocean Production's Blue Water Studio based in Calgary in Canada. Due to Bandai not having rights to the theme songs outside of Asia, the opening and closing sequences were altered.

The English subtitles were criticized as inaccurate and appeared to be based on the script for the English dub, rather than a direct translation of the original Japanese script. Bandai corrected the subtitles to a properly translated version for later DVD releases in 5 cases with two discs each. Each disc contained five episodes.

In 2006, Bandai Entertainment acquired the rights to the US release of the "A New Translation" film trilogy, originally slated for release on June 22, 2010, but was later changed to July 6. The series and films have been out of print, following the closure of Bandai Entertainment.

On October 11, 2014, at their 2014 New York Comic Con panel, Sunrise announced they would be releasing all of the Gundam franchise, including the Zeta Gundam TV series and films in North America through distribution from Right Stuf Inc., beginning in Spring 2015.

== Related media ==
=== Novels ===
No.	Title	Author	Publisher	Date	ISBN
1	Mobile Suit Zeta Gundam 1: Kamille Bidan (機動戦士Zガンダム 第一部 カミーユ・ビダン)	Yoshiyuki Tomino	Kodansha	February 1985	9784062018807
2	Mobile Suit Zeta Gundam 2: Amuro Ray (機動戦士Zガンダム 第二部 アムロ・レイ)	Yoshiyuki Tomino	Kodansha	June 1985	9784062021678
3	Mobile Suit Zeta Gundam 3: Cyber Newtype (機動戦士Zガンダム 第三部 強化人間)	Yoshiyuki Tomino	Kodansha	September 1985	9784062023658
4	Mobile Suit Zeta Gundam 4: Return of the Zabi Family (機動戦士Zガンダム 第四部 ザビ家再臨)	Yoshiyuki Tomino	Kodansha	January 1986	9784062026147
5	Mobile Suit Zeta Gundam 5: Where to go back (機動戦士Zガンダム 第五部 戻るべき処)	Yoshiyuki Tomino	Kodansha	February 1986	9784062026918

=== Manga ===
A manga adaptation of the series by Kazuhisa Kondo was released by Kodansha in Comic BomBom from March 1985 to February 1986 issues, and compiled into three volumes. A manga remake was also made entitled Mobile Suit Zeta Gundam Define (機動戦士Ζガンダム Define, Kidō Senshi Zēta Gandamu Define). This remake was written and illustrated by Hiroyuki Kitazume and began serialiation in Gundam Ace on June 25, 2011.

=== Compilation films ===
In celebration of Gundam's 25th anniversary (and also the 20th anniversary of Zeta Gundam), the 50-episode series was compiled into a film trilogy called Mobile Suit Zeta Gundam: A New Translation. According to Tomino, the films were created to fix some of the problems he identified in the television series and to bring it into a 21st-century context for a new generation now experiencing the increasingly commercialized series, such as Mobile Suit Gundam SEED. The first film, Heirs to the Stars, opened on May 28, 2005, followed by Lovers on October 29, 2005, and Love is the Pulse of the Stars on March 6, 2006.

The compilations digitally remastered the television series of Zeta Gundam with new footage. Around 33% of "Heir to the Stars" was newly animated footage, with 70% for "Lovers" and almost 80% for "Love is the Pulse of the Stars". However, several major plot events from the TV series were either edited or removed to allow the films to flow more smoothly, unlike Tomino's previous Gundam film compilations. Likewise, the fate of some characters in the television version was entirely changed, notably Kamille's – in the original, his final battle renders him into a vegetative state, while he remains physically and mentally fit by the end of the film trilogy. In addition, mobile suits belonging to the Gundam timeline, but designed after the television broadcast of Zeta Gundam, were also placed into the films.

Shigeaki Saegusa's musical score from the TV series was reused for the films, with the addition of new songs by Japanese singer-songwriter Gackt. A music video for the first film's opening theme "Metamorphoze" featured Gackt singing inside a mobile suit cockpit during battle.

The majority of the original TV voice cast returned to reprise their respective roles. Yō Inoue, who died in 2003 – was posthumously credited, as an archived recording of her voice was used for a cameo appearance of Sayla Mass in the third film. There were some changes to the voice cast – namely Yukana replacing Saeko Shimazu as Four Murasame, Satomi Arai replacing Miyuki Matsuoka as Fa Yuiry and a few others. This change sparked controversy among fans, who suspected that Yukana used her relationship with sound director Sadayoshi Fujino to land her role. The films were a box office success in Japan.

=== Games ===
In 1985, Bandai released a special board game based on the series. Designed for two to four players, Mobile Suit Gundam: Take Off MKII has a paper map and 12 miniatures of various AEUG and Titans mobile suits, plus game rules and mission files. Kidō Senshi Z-Gundam: Hot Scramble followed in 1986. The first Gundam video game for home consoles, Hot Scramble featured first-person and side-scrolling stages. This would be followed by a 3D-fighting game, Mobile Suit Z Gundam, for the Sony PlayStation in Japan in 1997. Featuring remastered cutscenes from the series, it is compatible with the PlayStation Analog Joystick (SCPH-1110) and comes on two discs, allowing players to experience the series from the viewpoints of Kamille and Char, as well as to play multiplayer on two consoles with separate displays using the PlayStation Link Cable, requiring only one copy of the game. Bandai later added the series' mobile suits as part of Gundam Vs. Zeta Gundam in 2004.

In addition, Tecmo Koei and Namco Bandai have co-published the Dynasty Warriors: Gundam franchise since 2007.

== Reception ==
=== Critical reception ===
Mobile Suit Zeta Gundam is praised by fans of the Universal Century sect of the franchise, with many lauding it for its bleak tone, character development, and its complicated expression of war. But even the series' director, Yoshiyuki Tomino, has expressed not liking the show.

The review website Mania.com gave the anime an overall 'B+' rating, regarding it as "one of Yoshiyuki Tomino's greatest works." They stated that the "lack of an A/A+ is that this is recommended for fans who are already familiar with the Universal Century storyline," recommending that audiences view "the original film trilogy" first before watching Zeta Gundam. The reviewer Chris Beveridge of Mania.com gave certain volumes of the series a full 'A' rating, describing the last ten episodes as being "the huge payoff episodes" where "you can almost feel the characters being rushed around a bit and moved through the paces. But at the same time, it all comes so fast that it's simply enjoyable to watch so much happen and change so quickly."

Beveridge would later review the Blu-Ray releases of the series for The Fandom Post, giving both sets of Blu-Rays an 'A−' rating. Beveridge writes in the review for the first set, "It's hard to believe that it's been almost ten years since I last saw this series as you realize just how much anime you consume. But it also makes you realize which ones truly stand out over the course of time and this one is definitely one of them." Beveridge found the second half of the series weaker, though still claims that the show "hits most things right".

While reviewing for the Blu-ray release of the series, Ollie Barder of Forbes gave the show a rave review, even titling it as "Possibly The Greatest 'Gundam' Series Ever Made". Barder praised the series' more realistic approach to war and its striking designs for the many different robots, though did find the transforming mechas out of place in Zeta's more grounded reality. Lauren Orsini of Anime News Network also praised the series in a review for the first Blu-ray release, giving the dub for the first set a 'B', praising it for its powerful storytelling. Orsini was more critical of the second half of the series, finding the plot too chaotic and calling it Gundam's "awkward coming-of-age". But Orsini still praised the second half for its mecha designs and strong emotional payoffs, ultimately giving the subtitle version of the series a 'B'.

Comic Book Resources listed Mobile Suit Zeta Gundam as the best Gundam anime in their 2020 list, and the series was later ranked as the highest-rated Gundam show on IMDb. Bluefin Brand, one of the biggest distributors of Gunpla model kits and other Japanese branded toys in the west, had Zeta Gundam the top show to watch in the franchise.

In the NHK's 2018 mega "All Gundam Poll", Mobile Suit Zeta Gundam was placed as the second-best anime in the Gundam franchise, only behind the original 1979 Gundam show. The Zeta Gundam mecha was voted as the second-best mobile suit in the same poll, only behind the RX-93 ν Gundam (also known as the Nu Gundam) from Char's Counterattack. The second opening song, Mizu no Hoshi e Ai wo Komete (水の星へ愛をこめて, From the Aqueous Star with Love), was also voted the best Gundam song in the franchise. Hiroko Moriguchi, the original singer of Mizu no Hoshi, re-recorded a new version of the song in Gundam Song Covers, along with the nine other songs in the top ten of NHK's poll. A music video of Moriguchi's new version of Mizu no Hoshi was released in 2019. The NHK reported that there was a total of 1,740,280 votes in the poll, with 46% of the votes for Zeta coming from voters between the ages 40 to 46.

== See also ==
- Mobile Suit Gundam
- Mobile Suit Gundam ZZ
- Kidou Senshi Z-Gundam: Hot Scramble
- Space Runaway Ideon
- Super Dimension Fortress Macross

== Sources ==
- グレートメカニックG 2018 SUMMER (in Japanese). Futabasha. June 2018. ISBN 9784575465099.
- グレートメカニックG 2018 WINTER (in Japanese). Futabasha. December 2018. ISBN 978-4575465136.
- グレートメカニックG 2020 WINTER (in Japanese). Futabasha. December 2020. ISBN 978-4575465259.

Preceded by Mobile Suit Gundam	Gundam metaseries (production order); 1985–1986	Succeeded by Mobile Suit Gundam ZZ
Preceded by Mobile Suit Gundam 0083: Stardust Memory	Gundam Universal Century timeline U.C. 0087–0088	Succeeded by Gundam Sentinel (novel), Mobile Suit Gundam ZZ
