= Clover (toy company) =

Japanese toy company

- Company type: Private (x–x); Subsidiary (x–x)
- Industry: Entertainment
- Founded: 1973
- Defunct: 1983; 43 years ago
- Fate: Filled for bankruptcy
- Headquarters: Japan
- Products: Robot toys

Clover was a Japanese toy company founded in January 1973 by a former head of Tsukuda Hobby. It closed in 1983.

Zaku Gundam toys made by Clover

Today it is mainly known as the sponsor of the original Gundam TV-series in 1979. As such, it was responsible for ending the season early because of lackluster toy sales. The show was mainly popular among older kids and young adults who did not buy toys, and sales suffered as a result. Also Clover's designs were not based on the finished version of the show and thus were not very accurate. Gundam ended up being very popular after it was re-edited into a film-trilogy, but Clover's toys were still not a hit.

Instead it was Bandai who capitalized on the show by selling model-kits that became extremely popular.

Gundam had started the Real Robot trend which changed the focus to "realistic" robots instead of the "super robots" which Clover were used to making. They tried to adapt to the new market by sponsoring shows such as Xabungle, Dunbine, and Srungle (the first 2 being directed by Gundam creator Yoshiyuki Tomino) but folded in 1983.
