= Gaia Gear =

Novel series by Yoshiyuki Tomino

- The original novel cover of Gaia Gear (volume 3, 1990)

ガイア・ギア (Gaia Gia)
- Genre: Drama, mecha, military science fiction
- Serial novel
- Written by: Yoshiyuki Tomino
- Illustrated by: Hiroyuki Kitazume, Mamoru Ito, Yoshinori Sayama
- Published by: Kadokawa Shoten
- Magazine: Newtype
- Original run: April 1987 – December 1991
- Volumes: 5
- Audio drama
- Written by: Akinori Endo
- Music by: Masahiro Kawasaki
- Studio: Bandai Visual
- Station: Nippon Cultural Broadcasting
- Original run: April 12, 1992 – October 4, 1992
- Episodes: 26

Gaia Gear is a series of novels created and written by Yoshiyuki Tomino. Part of the Gundam metaseries, but not part of the canonical Gundam storyline, it was later adapted into a 26-episode radio drama.

The character designer is Hiroyuki Kitazume, and the mechanical designer is Mamoru Ito (Yoshinori Sayama only for the pre-renovation Zorin Soul). Kenichi Onuki, Morifumi Naka, Masanori Nishii, Hideaki Anno and Yoshiyuki Sadamoto from GAINAX participated in the frontispiece drawing of the pocket books.

== Plot ==
=== Setting ===
Gaia Gear is a story set in the 0200s of the Universal Century, about 110 years after Mobile Suit Gundam: Char's Counterattack, and depicts the exploits of a young man named Affranchi Char who inherits the memories of Char Aznable. It is set in the future of the Universal Century timeline of the Mobile Suit Gundam anime universe, but is not treated as a canonical Gundam by Sunrise.

In this era, most people live on space colonies. In order to protect the environment and prevent pollution, the Earth is, in principle, completely uninhabitable, and the only people who are allowed to live on the planet are federal government employees who monitor the environment. In reality, however, a few privileged people and a large number of illegal residents remain on the planet. In addition, although officially denied, there are industrial production bases scattered throughout the world. In response to this, the MHA (Man Hunting Agency), a secret police, was established within the Earth Federation as a "manhunting unit" to detect illegal residents on Earth. However, the MHA, which was only an internal bureau of the Earth Federation, emerged as a private army based on a kind of elitism, and began to suppress people with anti-Earth Federation ideas.

On the other hand, the Metatron (Zee Zeon Organization), an anti-Earth Federation group in which Afflanchi participates, consist of supporters of Char Aznable. Some of them are followers of the Principality of Zeon, but the core of the group are people who are genuinely obsessed with the dream of carrying on Char's legacy. In order to shake the federal government with Char's charisma, they carried out "Char Continuation Operation" and created a "memory clone" with Char's memories, Afflanchi Char, and welcomed him as their leader.

Instead of "Mobile Suits" of the previous century, the main weapon is a humanoid mobile weapon called "Man Machines".

=== Story ===
U.C.203, a young man named Afflanchi Char, who grew up on an island in an environmental reserve in the South Pacific, decides to go into space according to the will of his foster parent, Gaba Su. As a memory clone who has inherited the memories of the former hero Char, he is elevated to the leader of the anti-Earth Federation group "Metatron". He boards the Man Machine "Gaia Gear Alpha" and fights against the Federation's secret police force "MHA". However, when Afflanchi refused to act as Char Aznable and continued to act as himself, the rift between him and the Metatron's leaders gradually widened.

== Copyright problem ==
As of 2026, Gaia Gear, both the novel and the CDs, are all out of print. The reason for this is that it is an original novel created by Yoshiyuki Tomino using the settings and world of Mobile Suit Gundam. Although Tomino later reconciled with Sunrise and was listed as the original author in the credits of the Gundam series, he sold his original author rights to Sunrise when the first Mobile Suit Gundam was produced. (Note: This was not an uncommon practice in those days.) Therefore, he had no right to start a new work belonging to the Gundam series on his own authority at that time. However, in the late 1980s when Gaia Gear was written, the Gundam series itself had not grown into the big business that it is today, and Sunrise initially tolerated Gaia Gear. However, with the subsequent success of the OVA series Mobile Suit Gundam 0080: War in the Pocket and Mobile Suit Gundam 0083: Stardust Memory and the release of sequel films such as Mobile Suit Gundam: Char's Counterattack and Mobile Suit Gundam F91 directed by Tomino, they gradually tightened their control. In fact, the title of this work was announced as Mobile Suit Gaia Gear: Char's Counterattack before the start of serialization in the Newtype magazine, but when serialization began, the title was changed first to Mobile Suit Gaia Gear (episodes 1 to 5 of the series), then to Newtype Saga Gaia Gear (episode 6 onwards), and when it was published as a pocket book, it was simply listed as Gaia Gear. When the radio drama was made into a CD, the package had two credits on it: "Gaia Gear (c) Yoshiyuki Tomino, Kadokawa Shoten, Newtype" and "Mobile Suit Gundam (c) Sotsu Agency, Sunrise". When Fukkan.com negotiated with Tomino to reissue the book, he refused to give permission because of the "quality" of the work.

After that, Sotsu, which owns the Gundam trademark, was acquired by Bandai Namco Holdings through a tender offer in 2019. Sunrise became a wholly owned subsidiary of Bandai in 1994 and was consolidated into Bandai Namco Filmworks in 2022 to become one of its brands.

== Characters ==
Affranchi Char (アフランシ・シャア, Afuranshi Shā)
The leader of Metatron, who has inherited the memories of Char Aznable.
An orphan with no memory of his childhood, he was raised on an environmentally protected island in the South Pacific by the island's elder, Gaba Su. At the age of 19, he decides to go to space following the will of his adoptive father, Gaba Su. As if guided by the sounds echoing in his head, he leaves the island despite the objections of his girlfriend, Everly Key.
He is a young man with blond hair reminiscent of a pure-blooded Caucasian, and his appearance closely resembles that of Char Aznable. He is in fact a clone of Char Aznable, artificially created as his successor, with a cell chip containing Char's memories implanted in his brain. However, Affranchi's personality is not that of Char, even though he has memories of Char and shares the same genetic traits as him.
The word "affranchi" means "freed slave" in French.
Everly Kee (エヴァリー・キー, Evarī Kī)
A brown-skinned, mixed-race woman who grew up on a southern island with Affranchi. She is Afflanchi's childhood friend, lover, and wife. She instinctively likes attention and knows how to show herself, but she is not aware of it. That's why she is lovely, Affranchi thinks.
She has a fierce temper and once accepts her fate to send Affranchi away, but she cannot give up and leaves the island after him.
Ul Urian (ウル・ウリアン, Uru Urian)
A preppy-looking young man that Afflanchi and the other members of Metatron meet on the space colony Hellas. He is actually a member of MHA who approached them accidentally on purpose, a pilot of Man Machine, and a second lieutenant. He has a handsome face and makes a good impression on others, but his true nature is ferocious and cunning.
He came from a poor background and worked hard to join the MHA, and finds favor in Dargol's eyes and stands out. He also agrees with Dargol's views and works as his advance guard, but gradually becomes frustrated about being forced to move at his will.
He has a strong rivalry with Afflanchi, who is born with excellent abilities and a blessed origin.
Krishna Pandent (クリシュナ・パンデント, Kurishuna Pandento)
A member of Metatron. She is a brown-skinned woman with a fraction of Indian blood and looks Indian, but she is a mixture of several ethnicities. She is a stark contrast to Affranchi, the iconic white purebred. Although she was not raised in a particularly Indian way or taught Hinduism, she prefers to wear saris on a regular basis and chant the names of Hindu deities when she meditates.
She is from the slums of the space colony Hellas, and is ashamed of that. She believed that a radical improvement in their environment would require a world-change through Metatron's activities. However, she finds a grain of truth in MHA member Ul Urian's remark that "there is a sense of white supremacy in the fishiness of Char Continuous Operation," and she realizes that she is wrong.
She realizes that Affranchi sees another woman, Everly's simulacrum in her and runs away to Ul Urian to get back at him and turns to the MHA. However, she despairs when she discovers Ul's true nature and the reality of MHA.
Miranda Howe (ミランダ・ハウ, Miranda Hau)
A member of Metatron who greeted Afflanchi and Everly as Baum Zegen's secretary in Hong Kong. She is a woman with the appearance of a successful career woman, with a mix of red hair and blonde hair, and brown eyes. Her father is a privileged official in the Earth Federation government, but her admiration for Char Aznable led her to join Metatron.
After joining up with Afflanchi, she begins to work with him as his assistant and advisor. However, when Afflanchi becomes dependent on her with everything, she softly refuses.
Kellan Mead (ケラン・ミード, Keran Mīdo)
A pilot belonging to Metatron. He is a strong, hasty, and easy to fire-up personality, but is a competent pilot. He is dogmatic and reckless, unable to see the big picture, but useful in emergencies, and is arrogant and rough, but also quick-witted.
He doesn't care where he belongs as long as he can make a living handling Man Machines, and he came to Metatron simply because he dislikes bureaucrats.
At first, he underestimated Affranchi as an amateur pilot, but after falling behind Affranchi's Gaia Gear α, he came to recognize his abilities.
Joe Suren (ジョー・スレン, Jō Suren)
A pilot belonging to Metatron. He is a slender young man, kind, sensitive, and serious, but also a bit dogmatic and inflexible.
He realizes he is in love with Krishna after she goes missing on Earth, but encounters Krishna accompanying Ul during a reconnaissance mission.
Benoit Rojak (ブノア・ロジャック, Bunoa Rojakku)
A female Man Machine pilot belonging to Metatron and the captain of a reinforcement unit. She was worried when she received an order to kill Affranchi from Metatron executives.
Madras Kalia (マドラス・カリア, Madorasu Karia)
A member of Metatron. Man Machine pilot, Captain of Air Force 1. He is well-liked, mainly as a leader in the field, and is an ally to Afransi. He is about 40 years old and has a mustache.
Memm Keiren (メンム・ケイレン, Menmu Keiren)
Captain of Mother Metatron (Thirty-One Square). He didn't have a favorable impression of Afflanchi, who refuses to act as Char Aznable, from the beginning, and was rarely on his side. Miranda looked relieved when he only took a cooperative attitude once.
Messer Met (メッサー・メット, Messā Metto)
A pilot belonging to Metatron. He was a member of the gang in Hellas, but Afflanchi assigned him to the Man Machine unit under his direct control.
He was born in one of the poorest areas of Hellas. Afflanchi believes that Metatron, a group of principled people, needs a "foreign body" like him to activate the organization.
Lae Sayers (レエ・セイアス, Rē Seiasu)
A female pilot belonging to Metatron. She was a member of the gang in Hellas, but Afflanchi assigned her to the Man Machine unit under his direct control.
She had no parents and lived in desperation with gang. She loved a simple, clear world where she did not have to use her imagination, where only power proved her position.
There is something decent about Messer, so she couldn't quite like him. However, when she found herself a talented pilot, learned to endure within the organization, and became familiar with Affranchi, who didn't let feel his suffering around him, she could also allow Messer to be naive.
Laserm Stack (レーザム・スタック, Rēzamu Sutakku)
A pilot belonging to Metatron. He was a member of the gang in Hellas, but Afflanchi assigned him to the Man Machine unit under his direct control.
Saez Consoon (サエス・コンスーン, Saesu Konsūn)
A pilot belonging to Metatron. He was a member of the gang in Hellas, but Afflanchi assigned him to the Man Machine unit under his direct control.
Tot Gehring (トット・ゲーリング, Totto Gēringu)
The gang boss in Hellas. He was forced to work on Earth as a political prisoner, but escaped and joined Metatron. He was the go-between for Affranchi and Messer and his associates.
Truth Stroger (トルース・シュトロンガー, Torūsu Syutorongā)
A watcher sent by Metatron. A drunken, middle-aged white man and white supremacist.
When Everly came after Affranchi, he slapped her for not being worthy of him.
Baum Segen (バアム・ゼーゲン, Bāmu Zēgen)
A middle-aged white man wearing a white top and bottom, serving as the president of a real estate company in Hong Kong. He was a member of the Zee Zeon Organization and managed the building that preserved Zorin Soul.
Jiang Wen Hu (ジャン・ウェン・フー, Jan Wen Fū)
A highly skilled pilot of Hong Kong MHA. He is an excellent military man and commander who works independently of politics and ideological beliefs. Dargol, rumored to be a white supremacist, appreciated his abilities but did not trust him.
Azariah Parrish (アザリア・パリッシュ, Azaria Parisshu)
An elderly man who is a founding member and the actual leader of Metatron.
Metatron, as originally planned, welcomed Afflanchi as its leader, but there was a gap in perception between Parrish, who wanted Afflanchi to be the second coming of Char, and Afflanchi, who believed he was not a copy of Char. Afflanchi refuses to act as Char and their relationship deteriorates.
Bijan Dargol (ビジャン・ダーゴル, Bijan Dāgoru)
The leader of MHA in the Hellas Administration. He has the appearance of a do-gooder man with hollow cheeks and almost transparent blue eyes. Not satisfied with the present situation, he wanted to control and lead the entire Maha.
He devised and implemented the "Earth Reverse Immigration Plan" in which space immigrants would return to Earth. He used the emigration to Earth to rally support, and succeeded in climbing to the top of MHA and overseeing the police system. He also succeeded in transferring command of all forces from the Earth Federation Forces to MHA. As a result, Dargol succeeded in making MHA independent from the Earth Federation government, and he intended to create his own empire on Earth, the Gaia Empire. He has adopted a policy of seclusion against the Space Colony Federation, and were trying to build a system that would eliminate incompetents and resistance groups, and only accept capable collaborators.
It is said that he was considering a policy of preferential treatment for whites, but he himself says that there is no racism in MHA.
He was fascinated by Wagner's aesthetics, and was particularly obsessed with the symbolic Neuschwanstein Castle.

== Media ==
=== Novel ===
This novel was first serialized in Newtype magazine from April 1987 to December 1991, and then published by Kadokawa Shoten under the Kadokawa Sneaker Bunko label with a total of five volumes.

No.	Title	Author	Publisher	Date	ISBN
1	Gaia Gear 1 (ガイア・ギア 1)	Yoshiyuki Tomino	Kadokawa Shoten	August 11, 1988	9784044101237
2	Gaia Gear 2 (ガイア・ギア 2)	Yoshiyuki Tomino	Kadokawa Shoten	August 4, 1989	9784044101244
3	Gaia Gear 3 (ガイア・ギア 3)	Yoshiyuki Tomino	Kadokawa Shoten	August 7, 1990	9784044101251
4	Gaia Gear 4 (ガイア・ギア 4)	Yoshiyuki Tomino	Kadokawa Shoten	January 28, 1992	9784044101268
5	Gaia Gear 5 (ガイア・ギア 5)	Yoshiyuki Tomino	Kadokawa Shoten	March 27, 1992	9784044101275

==== Volume summaries ====
===== Volume 1 =====
Affranchi Char is a 19-year-old man who was raised on an island in the Pacific Ocean. The "cell chips" inside his brain contain strange memories and information. Affranchi was raised by a man named Gaba Suu, one of the island's elders. On his deathbed, Gaba Suu tells Affranchi to go into space, but his lover Everly Key is strongly opposed. One day, a giant humanoid machine washes up on the island's shore, and Affranchi makes up his mind to leave.

One stormy night, Affranchi sneaks away in a canoe, intending to catch a ship for Hong Kong and go from there into space. While he is waiting for the ship, he meets and quarrels with a bigoted stranger who tells Affranchi that the white man is humanity's elite, destined to rule over the lesser races.

After Affranchi boards the ship, it is hijacked by pirates. Everly, who has followed Affranchi aboard, is taken hostage. Affranchi displays an uncanny prowess in the martial arts and defeats the hijackers.

Upon their arrival in Hong Kong, Affranchi and Everly are met by a waiting limousine. They are taken to meet the mysterious Berm Segen and his secretary Miranda Howe, who give Affranchi the antique "Man Machine" (Mobile Suit), the Zorin Soul. Suddenly, strangers burst in and kill Berm Segen, and our heroes flee in the Zorin Soul. Affranchi operates the machine with unnatural skill, returning Everly to her home island and then heading to Hong Kong.

In Hong Kong, Affranchi battles the forces of Maha, the Federation government's dreaded "Man-Hunting Agency." Formally known as the 13th Special Investigative Section of the Earth Federation Government Police Agency, this group is responsible for discovering illegal Earth residents and deporting them to the space colonies.

Affranchi is able to fight off the Maha forces and, with the help of Miranda Howe, he hijacks a space shuttle and loads the Zorin Soul on board. Miranda tells the shuttle pilot to set course for the Side 4 shoal zone. Here they rendezvous with the waiting transport ship Spacious, whose crew greet Affranchi as "Your Excellency Char Aznable." Among the crew is a beautiful young woman named Krishna Pandent.

The Spacious heads for the Side 2 colony Hellas, hiding Affranchi and Miranda in order to smuggle them into the colony. The ship makes its way through the colony to the factory block at the other end, along the way rescuing a young hang-glider named Ul Urian. The Spacious reaches the factory block and drops Ul Urian off, but the timing of his chance encounter with the Spacious strikes the crew as very suspicious.

===== Volume 2 =====
Affranchi, Miranda, and Krishna board an electric car and drive through the colony. They enter the Grenze district, which is a colossal slum, and a sudden attack by Maha's Minox craft forces them to flee into the tunnels in search of shelter. Affranchi is separated from his comrades and captured by the police.

After clashing with his cellmates, Affranchi befriends one of them, a giant named Todd Goering. Affranchi is then released, but the Maha agent Ul Urian has planted a transmitter in his stomach in order to track him. Ul Urian submits a report to his commander Bijan Dargol, and then goes to meet Krishna for a "date" with the intention of taking her prisoner.

Affranchi wanders the streets and encounters a gang of delinquents led by a man named Messer Mett, who turns out to be another friend of Todd Goering. Affranchi then runs into Miranda Howe and another Spacious crewmember named Joe Suren, who feed him a big dose of laxatives so he can get rid of the transmitter.

Meanwhile, Ul Urian meets Krishna at a French restaurant and begins quizzing her about the "Z Organization" for which she works and the whereabouts of its secret base "314." Krishna attempts to escape but is abducted by Ul Urian. Affranchi and friends begin pursuit, and Ul Urian summons his Minox, bringing Krishna aboard with him.

The Z Organization dispatches the Gaia Gear, operated by a pilot named Keran Mead, to engage the Minox. But since Krishna is aboard the Minox, the Gaia Gear is helpless to fight it. Fortunately, the Gaia Gear is protected by its barrier, and the Minox ends up losing control and crashing thanks to the shockwaves caused by its own attacks. Two Gussa man machines appear, and Keran's Gaia Gear knocks one to the ground, allowing Affranchi to board it and defeat the second enemy machine.

Affranchi, Keran, and their comrades escape the colony and board the Z Organization's warship "Thirty-One Square." Overruling the ship's captain, Affranchi orders the crew to rescue the captive Krishna. While he's at it, he renames the Z Organization "Metatron" and rechristens the Thirty-One Square as "Mother Metatron."

The Mother Metatron heads for Hellas, demanding that the colony government turn over its political prisoners. The Maha commander Bijan Dargol, meanwhile, readies his own military response.

===== Volume 3 =====
The Mother Metatron approaches Hellas, with Affranchi leading the charge in his Gaia Gear. Affranchi, impatient with the stalling of the colony government, orders the Mother Metatron to fire on the colony's agricultural blocks. Using this as a pretext, Bijan Dargol launches a preemptive attack on the Metatron forces.

Ul Urian launches from the Maha flagship Maha Gayjisu to lead the attack, piloting the new man machine Bromb Texter and carrying Krishna as a hostage. But just before he enters battle, Ul Urian sets Krishna adrift in space, with the intention of picking her up later. Affranchi easily defeats Ul Urian and then, sensing Krishna's whereabouts, goes to rescue her.

Having recovered Krishna and collected the colony's other political prisoners, the Mother Metatron heads for the secret base "Thirty-One Cubed." Among the released prisoners are the delinquent Messer Mett and his lackeys Rey Seias, Reyzam Stack, and Saez Konsoon, who decide to remain with Metatron and become combat pilots. However, they get along poorly with the rest of the crew and begin considering desertion.

Metatron learns that the Maha fleet is preparing to descend to Earth, an act of "reverse immigration" by which Maha will establish its own nation on Earth. The Mother Metatron likewise sets course for Earth in order to intercept the enemy fleet.

The Metatron forces deploy the shuttles Air Force 1 and Air Force 2, escorted by Affranchi's Gaia Gear. Ul Urian's Bromb Texter attempts to intercept the Gaia Gear, but Messer Mett and his comrades unexpectedly join the battle and attack the Bromb Texter. Reyzam's man machine Dochadi is shot down in the ensuing combat.

The fighting continues as both sides enter the atmosphere. Affranchi rams into Ul Urian's Bromb Texter, forcing the enemy pilot to retreat. The Maha Gayjisu deploys its Gussa forces, the Metatron shuttles launch their own man machines, and the Metatron forces are ultimately forced to withdraw. Messer and his two surviving henchmen desert during the battle.

Air Force 1 and Air Force 2 land in Hamar, Norway, where the Metatron members join forces with the local resistance. Messer and his comrades go to ground in Ireland, where they learn from a news broadcast that the main Maha fleet has arrived in Nouveau Paris. They decide to surrender to Maha, offering their man machines as gifts.

As they approach Nouveau Paris, Messer and his friends encounter a Federation Forces truck convoy. They begin negotiating their surrender, only to discover that their old comrade Todd Goering is among the prisoners being transported in the convoy. Instead of surrendering, they decide to rescue Todd and escape, but a Gussa team from Nouveau Paris is now in hot pursuit. Picking up Messer's distress signal, Air Force 1 and Affranchi's Gaia Gear launch to meet them, and an aerial battle begins over Denmark.

===== Volume 4 =====
Affranchi leads the Metatron forces to victory, repulsing Ul Urian's man machine team and successfully recovering Messer and friends. However, during the battle Krishna falls out of Air Force 1, and the Metatron forces have no time to search for her before they withdraw.

Back at Hamar, Todd tells Affranchi and the others what he learned about Maha's plans while toiling as a forced laborer. It appears that Maha intends to establish a "Gaia Empire" on Earth, governed by a chosen elite. For sentimental reasons, the Maha commander Bijan Dargol has chosen Bavaria as the heart of his new empire.

Krishna, meanwhile, has once again been picked up by Ul Urian, who has now been demoted to command of the support vehicle Bushing Nugg. Having used hypnotic interrogation to find out everything she knows about Metatron, Ul Urian is now keeping her around for his own amusement. Accepting her situation, Krishna decides to throw in her lot with Maha.

The two sides soon clash again at Liege, Belgium. After a gun battle in the city, the Metatron and Maha pilots run for their machines. Rey Seias, Saez Konsoon, and Keran Mead enter battle in Dochadis, but Saez and Keran are shot down by Ul Urian's Bromb Texter, and Rey's damaged machine crashes in the forest. Air Force 1 attacks the Bushing Nugg, but is shot down by Krishna's anti-air fire, and the crew are forced to escape.

Air Force 2 and Affranchi's Gaia Gear finally arrive, driving the Maha forces away. Rey and the Air Force 1 crew are rescued, but the Metatron forces have taken heavy losses and they are shocked by Krishna's betrayal.

The Mother Metatron begins bombarding Nouveau Paris with missiles, and Miranda Howe arrives with reinforcements in the form of Air Force 3. The Mother Metatron's bombardment inflicts considerable damage on the Maha forces, and the Maha Gayjisu withdraws from the city. The Metatron forces gather in Besançon, France, to establish a frontline base.

Even as Affranchi and his comrades battle Maha's ground forces in Besançon, they learn that a Maha fleet from Hong Kong is now approaching the Adriatic Sea. The Metatron forces engage the Hong Kong Maha fleet, but are overwhelmed by the performance of the new enemy machine Gids Geese.

===== Volume 5 =====
Affranchi returns to Besançon to find that Todd Goering has devised a new plan for their man machine forces. The Gaia Gear will now be entrusted to Messer, while Affranchi stands by at Besançon.

Messer sorties in the Gaia Gear to intercept an approaching Bromb Texter, and returns with Ul Urian as his prisoner. From the Bromb Texter's flight data, they determine that the Maha forces are gathering at Munich, and Metatron begins preparations for an attack.

As the attack preparations are underway, the Metatron member Joe Suren takes off in the Zorin Soul in order to look for Krishna. He is detected by Maha, and the attack on Munich is aborted.

The Hong Kong Maha launch another attack, but this time they are outnumbered by Affranchi's Gaia Gear, Messer's captured Bromb Texter, and a third wave of reinforcements dropped from the Mother Metatron. Meanwhile, Krishna is wandering in the woods near the battlefield, and is rescued by a mysterious young woman.

Joe Suren finally locates Krishna, and in the process he retrieves a floppy disk from a crashed man machine. According to this floppy disk, Benoit Rojak, the leader of the new Metatron reinforcements, has been given secret orders to assassinate Affranchi after Maha has been eliminated. As for the mysterious young woman who rescued Krishna, she turns out to be Affranchi's former lover, Everly Key.

Affranchi and his comrades relocate to Monfalcone, Italy, to prepare for the final confrontation with Maha. Benoit Rojak and her Gaiyas team are already on the scene. Affranchi proposes that they make it look as if Metatron is attacking Munich and Neuschwanstein Castle, splitting the Maha forces so they can ambush Bijan Dargol himself.

Joe, Krishna, and Everly rush to Monfalcone to warn Affranchi of Benoit's treachery, but they are detected en route by Ul Urian, who has returned to Maha and received a new Gids Geese man machine. Joe drops off Krishna and Everly, then attempts to draw Ul Urian's attention away from them, but his Zorin Soul is swiftly shot down. Ul Urian finds the women and takes Everly captive, leaving Krishna behind.

Just before the Metatron forces begin their attack, Todd discovers Krishna in the nearby woods, and she tells Affranchi of Benoit's treachery and Everly's predicament. Affranchi continues the operation regardless, and joins battle with the enemy flagship Maha Gayjisu. Ul Urian enters the battle in his Gids Geese, carrying Everly as a hostage, and uses his knowledge of the Bromb Texter's characteristics and weaknesses to shoot down Messer's captured machine.

The battle continues. Bijan Dargol attempts to defend Neuschwanstein Castle from Affranchi's forces. Benoit Rojak ambushes and destroys the Maha Gayjisu, and the ensuing explosion consumes many nearby man machines, including Benoit's own. Metatron begins mopping up the remaining Maha forces, and Rey Seias is hit by Ul Urian, forcing her to make an emergency landing at the castle. Affranchi confronts Ul Urian and, sensing that Everly isn't aboard the enemy machine, shoots him down.

Rey and Affranchi enter the castle, where they find Everly. Affranchi and Everly embrace as Rey succumbs to her injuries.

Afflanchi and Everly flew from Bavaria to England aboard the Gaia Gear. After crossing the Irish Sea, Gaia Gear ran out of fuel and was dumped into the sea. They then crossed Ireland on foot, with only the desire to get to where they could see the Atlantic Ocean. Their journey ended when they stood on a cliff overlooking the Atlantic Ocean.

=== Radio drama ===
The radio drama was jointly produced by Bandai, Kadokawa Shoten, and Nippon Cultural Broadcasting as part of the 40th anniversary of Nippon Cultural Broadcasting. It aired from April 12 to October 4, 1992, and was then released as Sound Theater Gaia Gear on five CDs from November 1992 to July 1993. Two soundtrack CDs were also released.

The storyline and ending, setting, and character personalities differ slightly from those of the novel.

==== Staff ====
- Original Story: Yoshiyuki Tomino
- Planning: Shin Unosawa, Yumiko Takanashi
- Screenplay and Series Composition: Akinori Endo
- Character Design: Hiroyuki Kitazume
- Mechanical Design: Mamoru Ito, Junya Ishigaki
- Sound Director: Naoko Asari
- Music: Masahiro Kawasaki
- Sound Production: Central Music
- Production: Nippon Cultural Broadcasting Co.
- Production: Bandai Visual
- Narration: Makoto Otake, Hideyuki Tanaka

==== Theme songs ====
All songs are sung by Yoko Ichikawa.

All lyrics are written by Hitoshi Shinohara; all music is composed by Katsuki Maeda and arranged by Takayuki Negishi.

CD
No.	Title	Length
1.	"VOICE OF GAIA" (opening theme)
2.	"STAY WITH YOU〜星のように〜" (ending theme)

== Toys/models ==
The only toys and models of Gaia Gear were the Gaia Gear α, Zorin Soul, and Gussa garage kits released by Build Up in 1991. (Note: No longer available.) When they were released, the modeling magazine Monthly Hobby Japan featured them for three consecutive months.
