= Combat Mecha Xabungle =

Japanese anime television series

- 戦闘メカ ザブングル
- Created by: Hajime Yatate (concept); Yoshiyuki Tomino (story); Yoshitake Suzuki (story)
- Directed by: Yoshiyuki Tomino
- Music by: Kōji Makaino
- Country of origin: Japan
- Original language: Japanese
- No. of episodes: 50

Production
- Producers: Toru Moriyama (Nagoya TV); Hiroshi Funairi (Sotsu Agency); Hironori Nakagawa (Nippon Sunrise)
- Production companies: Nagoya TV; Sotsu Agency; Nippon Sunrise

Original release
- Network: ANN (Nagoya TV, TV Asahi)
- Release: February 6, 1982 – January 29, 1983

Related
- Anime film

Xabungle Graffiti
- Directed by: Yoshiyuki Tomino
- Studio: Nippon Sunrise
- Licensed by: NA: Maiden Japan
- Released: July 9, 1983
- Runtime: 84 minutes

Combat Mecha Xabungle (Japanese: 戦闘メカ ザブングル, Hepburn: Sentō Meka Zabunguru) also called Blue Gale Xabungle in promotional media, is a Japanese mecha anime television series created by Nippon Sunrise and directed by Yoshiyuki Tomino. It was broadcast on the Nagoya TV and TV Asahi networks weekly from February 6, 1982, to January 29, 1983. Promotional toys were produced by Clover. There was also a compilation movie made called Xabungle Graffiti, which included new footage and a different ending to the series. The anime series is licensed by Maiden Japan. It was released on an SDBD set on December 18, 2018.

== Plot ==
A young man named Jiron Amos is found in the desert by a group of bandits known as the Sand Rats (Rag, Blume, Dyke and Chill). Jiron hopes to steal the Walker Machine Xabungle from the local trader Carrying Cargo to use it to take revenge against the Breaker who killed his parents, Timp Sharon. After kidnapping Carrying's daughter, Elchi, she agrees to help them steal a Xabungle from her father's landship, the Iron Gear. Timp convinces a rockman named Groggy to attack the Iron Gear, and during the attack Carrying is killed. Elchi takes charge of the Iron Gear and possession of the transporter's license that belonged to her father. Her father's top Breaker, Kid Horla hopes to marry Elchi and gain the license, but she rejects him and he flees.

Following orders from the Innocent, Timp recruits several other Breakers and traders to defeat the Iron Gear including Gavlet Gablae and Bigman but they all fail and are killed. Running low on supplies, the Iron Gear heads to an Innocent dome to exchange blue rocks, a form of currency, for supplies. Although they are initially rejected, an Innocent overseer named Biel appears and agrees to make the trade. Jiron and his pursuit of Timp leads to multiple battles inside the dome and during one such attack Jiron ends up destroying the dome, forcing Biel and the others to depart. During the battle, Timp fakes his own death causing Jiron to believe he has gotten revenge.

The Iron Gear comes under attack from Kid Horla, now working for Biel and in possession of a landship. Following passage over the Mud Sea, where the Iron Gear is confronted by the mysterious Hanawan, Elchi leaves the Iron Gear, falling in love with a man named El Condor who is soon killed in a battle with Horla. Rag also leaves the Iron Gear and falls in love with a subordinate of Horla's who also dies. Timp tricks a trader named Karas Karas to battle the Iron Gear and he is eventually killed although his wife Greta makes it out alive. The Iron Gear battles Biel, now living in another Innocent dome, and Jiron steals the Walker Machine Gallier, which he pilots for the rest of the series.

Jiron meets a woman named Toran Milan, and through her influence the Iron Gear and its crew start working with an organization named Solt that rebels against the Innocent. Around this time Elchi is captured by the Innocent. Biel delivers her to a fellow overseer named Billam, but is demoted and abandoned. Elchi is put under an intense level of brainwashing by the Innocent, who cause her to desire the Iron Gear's destruction and Jiron's death. Solt's power continues to grow, although Jiron frequently clashes with its leader, Katakam. Katakam's methods are not respected however, and when everyone believes him to have been killed, he disappears from view, enabling Jiron to take on leadership of Solt.

The Innocent continues to send Breakers after the Iron Gear, including Greta, Kid Horla, the returned Timp, and even Elchi herself who is provided with a land ship identical to the Iron Gear. During an attempt to rescue Elchi, Biel is killed, but not before revealing the truth about the Innocent to Jiron and the others. The Innocent have created the civilians as a race that will be able to live in the harsh environment on their planet. Jiron and Solt hope to meet up with Innocent leader Arthur Rank, although his influence has been significantly reduced through the efforts of the villainous Kashim King.

Jiron and the others are able to capture Arthur Rank, who agrees with them that it is now time for the Innocent to relinquish their control of the planet. He broadcasts this message to all of the Innocent. Kashim continues to attack the Iron Gear and Solt, hoping to kill Arthur. Elchi is captured by the Iron Gear and with the sacrifice of Arthur her original personality is restored. The Iron Gear and Solt lead one final attack on the Innocent's stronghold, X Point. During the battle Kashim launches a series of missiles that cause heavy damage to Solt's forces. However, the Iron Gear smashes through the dome and Elchi attacks Kashim in the Xabungle. Kashim fires off a missile that causes a chain reaction when another missiles topples over. Kashim and Billam are crushed. The resulting explosion blinds Elchi. Jiron has one final battle with Timp, who flees. With Kashim dead, the Innocent's grasp on the planet has ended. Elchi runs away, thinking she will be a nuisance to everyone, but Jiron catches up with her and convinces her to return.

In Xabungle Graffiti (the compilation movie for the series), Arthur Rank, who had died before the end of the series, returns (in new footage) on a hover bike to sweep Elchi up and take her away, leaving Rag to claim Jiron herself.

== Cast ==
- Jiron Amos: Susumu Kotaki
- Elchi Cargo: Mari Yokoo
- Rag Uralo: Saeko Shimazu
- Burume: Toshio Furukawa
- Dyke: Keisuke Yamashita
- Chill: Tarako
- Maria Maria: Sumi Shimamoto (until episode 9), Hiroko Nomura (from episode 9)
- Birin Nada: Satomi Majima
- Kotsett Memuma: Shingo Hiromori
- Timp Sharon: Banjō Ginga
- Fatman Big: Banjō Ginga
- Narrator: Banjō Ginga
- Kid Horla: Issei Futamata
- Geraba Geraba: Tomomichi Nishimura
- Karas Karas: Toshiya Ueda
- Greta Karas: Kazue Komiya
- Toron Milan: Asami Mukaidono
- Bigman: Masaru Ikeda
- Arthur Rank: Kaneto Shiozawa
- Biel: Katsuji Mori
- Viram Key: Kōji Totani
- Kashim King: Ken'ichi Ogata

== Production ==
- Chief Director: Yoshiyuki Tomino.
- Script: Soji Yoshikawa, Tsunehisa Ito, Yoshihisa Araki.
- Storyboard: Kazuhito Kikuchi, Masakazu Yasumaru, Mitsuko Kase, Osamu Sekida, Toshifumi Takizawa, Yasuhiro Imakawa, Yoshiyuki Tomino, Yuki Suzuki.
- Episode Director: Mitsuko Kase, Osamu Sekida, Ryoji Fujiwara, Yasuhiro Imagawa, Yuki Suzuki.
- Music: Kōji Makaino.
- Original creator: Hajime Yatate, Yoshiyuki Tomino.
- Character Design: Tomonori Kogawa.
- Animation director: Akihiro Kaneyama, Masanori Yamada, Saburo Sakamoto.
- Mechanical design: Kunio Okawara and Yutaka Izubuchi.

== Theme songs ==
Opening: Gale Xabungle (疾風ザブングル, Shippū Zabunguru)

- Vocals: Akira Kushida (串田アキラ, Kushida Akira)

Ending: Dried-up Earth (乾いた大地, Kawaita Daichi)

- Vocals: Akira Kushida (串田アキラ, Kushida Akira)

== Episode list ==
1. "I Live By Risking My Life!"
2. "We Got a Xabungle!"
3. "Everyone's Got It Wrong!"
4. "Why Do You Break the Law?"
5. "Three's a Crowd!"
6. "What Are You Up to, Jiron?"
7. "Those Who Believe Are Saved"
8. "Miss Never Misses!"
9. "In the Field Blooms A Flower Named Maria"
10. "Brave Women Are Frightening"
11. "Chase Me! Chase Me!"
12. "The Many Mysteries of the Innocent"
13. "A Great Destruction Leaving Nothing Behind"
14. "Timp's Futile Resistance"
15. "Covered in Mud and Desperate"
16. "Sorrowful Elegy"
17. "A Duel with Actors and Noh Theatre"
18. "What's Wrong with Running Away from Home?"
19. "Take Flight, Condor!"
20. "Akon the Stud?"
21. "Falling in Love, Being in Love"
22. "Rag Broken in Pieces"
23. "Rag, Come Back! To My Heart"
24. "A Fierce Death Machine! Crying Kara"
25. "A Big Battle of Two Reckless Fighters"
26. "Chaotic Battle with the Innocent"
27. "Sing the Song of the Warrior!"
28. "The Innocent's Weakness"
29. "Even the Innocent Can Get Desperate"
30. "If They Get the Head, We're Done For"
31. "Manipulating a Woman's Heart"
32. "My Convenience Is Your Convenience"
33. "Never Ending Troubles"
34. "Fatman's Feelings Fly Far"
35. "Military Unit Discovered!"
36. "Special Sneaking Mission!"
37. "A Kaleidoscope of Women"
38. "Dance, Elchi!"
39. "Going Solo Is No Go"
40. "Katakamn, Ragged into Bits"
41. "End of Katakam"
42. "Greta Howls"
43. "Desperately Seeking Yop"
44. "Take Care, Sir Arthur"
45. "Stand Up to Face the Sun"
46. "Sir Arthur Does His Best"
47. "Awaken, Elchi!"
48. "Once and Future Sir Arthur"
49. "Showdown at X Point"
50. "Everybody, Run!"
