= Tomonori Kogawa =

Japanese animator

Tomonori Kogawa (湖川友謙, Kogawa Tomonori; born January 3, 1950 in Engaru, Hokkaidō) is a Japanese animator and character designer, often noted for his work in the 1980s with noted anime studio Sunrise.

== Works ==
- Farewell to Space Battleship Yamato (1978) - Chief Animation Director
- Space Runaway Ideon (1980) - Character Designer, Animation Director
- Combat Mecha Xabungle (1982) - Character Designer
- Aura Battler Dunbine (1983) - Original creator, Character Design, Animation Director (ep. 1), Production Supervision
- Super Dimension Cavalry Southern Cross (1984) - Character Designer
- Heavy Metal L-Gaim (1984) - Animation Director
- Odin: Photon Sailer Starlight (1985) - Character Design
- Greed (1985) - Original Creator, Director, Character Design, Screenplay, Storyboard, Animation Director
- Cool Cool Bye (1986) - Director, Script, Original story, Character Design, Animation Director
- Legend of the Galactic Heroes (1988-1997) - Storyboard (eps 7, 20), Animation Director (ep 7), Guest Character Design (eps 6–7)
- Tekkaman Blade (1992) - Character Design (as TOIIIO), Animation Coordination
- Casshan: Robot Hunter (1993) - Character Designer
- Strahl (1993) - Character Design
- 4th Super Robot Wars (1995) - Main Character Designer
- Space Battleship Yamato: Resurrection (2009) - Character Design, Animation Director
- Folktales from Japan (2012-2013) - Storyboard (eps 33a, 60a, 68c), Episode Director (eps 33a, 60a, 68c), Character Design (eps 33a, 60a, 68c), Art (eps 33a, 60a), Animation Director (eps 33a, 60a, 68c), Background Art (eps 33a, 60a), Color setting (ep 60a), Finish Animation (ep 60a), In-Between Animation (eps 60a, 68c), Key Animation (eps 33a, 60a, 68c)
- You Don't Know Gunma Yet (2018) - Character Design, Chief Animation Director, Key Animation (eps. 1–2)
