= Garzey's Wing =

1996–1997 anime series

- North American DVD cover of Garzey's Wing

ガーゼィの翼
- Genre: Isekai, Sword and sorcery
- Original video animation
- Directed by: Yoshiyuki Tomino
- Written by: Yoshiyuki Tomino
- Music by: Shirō Sagisu
- Studio: J.C.Staff
- Licensed by: NA: U.S. Manga Corps
- Released: 21 September 1996 – 9 April 1997
- Runtime: 30 minutes per episode
- Episodes: 3

Tales of Byston Well: Garzey's Wing (バイストン・ウェル物語 ガーゼィの翼, Baisuton Weru Monogatari Gāzei no Tsubasa) is a three-episode anime OVA by Japanese director Yoshiyuki Tomino based on volumes 1 and 2 of the five-volume novels series by the same name.

== Plot ==
The protagonist, Chris, is abruptly whisked away to a parallel world called Byston Well, while his physical body remains in his home world. In Byston Well, Chris' spiritual manifestation is thrust into a rebellion. Chris is told that he has a mystical power called "Garzey's wing", which causes large wings made of light to come out of his ankles, allowing him to fly and run quickly.

Chris is told to fight against slave owners and the King's army as the slaves of the Metomeus tribe make their escape from the palace at Izumido. The Ashigaba army fights back with horses, bows, and dinosaur-like creatures called War Beasts. The series centers around the slaves' exodus, the conflict between the King's army and the slaves, as well as Chris' struggle to make sense of his convoluted situation.

Chris exists simultaneously in Byston Well and the real world, and the two can communicate to each other through a necklace they both wear. Real-world Chris feels the bruises and pain Byston Well Chris experiences while fighting soldiers, and training he does in the real world allow him to learn it in Byston Well. While one Chris is in Byston Well surrounded by 12th- and 13th-century foreigners and being chased by a real army, earth Chris must do Chi exercises to strengthen his mind.

In the end, Chris fights off the army and saves Byston Well, but his spirit remains there. Meanwhile, in the real world Chris gains the power of Garzey's wing himself.

== Characters ==
Christopher Senshu

Chris is the main character in the film. The story is based around him and his adventures in Byston Well. He is depicted as a regular half-Japanese, half-American boy who is trying to get into college but has already failed the college entrance exams twice now. He can turn into Garzey's Wing when he or someone that he cares about is in grave danger.

Rumiko Nakato

A close personal friend of Chris who helps him get through the rough times as he is fighting in Byston Well.

King Fungun

The ruthless king, who lives in a palace in the city of Izumido, which was built on the backs of the countless slaves he has. Aware of the great powers of the Baraju Tree, King Fungun lets the slaves escape in hopes that they will lead him to the tree, where he then will be able to take it over from the Metomeus by force.

Zagazoa

General of the War Beast Army Corps. Came back to assist the King after he caught wind of the attack while fighting the savage Western tribe.

Gelgog Aji

General of the Ashigaba who dies when a limestone cave collapses. He had a scruffy beard and shoulder length brown hair.

Leelince

A female warrior among the slaves. She takes a position of semi-leadership in the escape. She is able make contact with a hooded figure who is a valuable fighter for the cause. She also exemplifies an attitude of jealously towards the relationship between Chris and Hassan-san. She is able to overcome her jealousy in episode 3.

Hassan

The priestess who is able to summon Chris to Bryston Well, using the eight Earthenware bells made from special blue clay. It is questioned how such a devious mind can hide in such innocent beauty. A more serious indictment comes from the general of the War Beasts when he accuses Hassan-san of being a fake maiden. Whether or not these claims have any backing has the potential to tarnish an otherwise wholesome reputation.

Aishe and Tance

Aishe (pink hair) and Tance (green hair) are Hassan's children. They assist her with spiritual activities.

Ketta Keras

Supreme Commander of the Metomeus.

Philocres

Ketta Keras' loyal advisor. Often dispenses useful but somewhat cynical information. Initially displays an aversion to Falan Fa.

Chifchi

A Metomeus lieutenant.

Domon

A Metomeus lieutenant. Leader of the suicide squad.

Giant Tawrad

Leelince finds Giant Tawrad and he is able to come to the rescue of the Metomeus when all hope seems lost. He comes and goes in the latter part of the series, fighting the War Beasts because (like many other people) he is morally dissatisfied by the dictatorship in Byston Well. It is pointed out that he has distinctive facial features that are often associated with the Garode tribe in the North.

Ondel

Food gatherer leader for the Metomeus.

Kurino

Hassan's assistant. Covers the bells so they can bake, and provides firewood.

Sechuku

Hassan's guard.

Lord Tawazzan

He helps with Chris's inventions and has a bowl cut.

Chris' other friends

Chris' other friends show a true, genuine sense of friendship towards Chris. It is evident when they believe Chris and don't even question the possibility that Chris might be going crazy when he starts to feel sick and begins communicating with the Chris in Byston Well. One who is specifically named is Ms. Tarsier.

Falan Fa

The only Ferario depicted throughout the story, who guides Chris as he adapts to his new world. She is introduced when she gets tangled up in Chris's necklace as he is moving between the real world and Byston Well. She also provides sound advice to Chris and the others when faced with perilous situations.

Daragau

These are the most feared of the War Beasts, because of their size and vicious nature. They are about 30–35 feet tall, mainly brown and grey, with a large orange spike on their head to use in battle.

Dragorol

Reptilian creatures found in the Boundless Plains of Gabujuju.

Bandou-ran

Smaller pink creatures used by the War Beast Army Corps. Used for carrying single soldiers into close combat situations. Their descriptions are similar to those of dinosaurs commonly known as raptors.

== Cast ==
Garzey's Wing cast
Role	Japanese	English
Christopher Senshu	Tetsuya Iwanaga	Rik Nagel
Rumiko Nakato	Junko Iwao	Suzanne Savoy
Falan Fa	Maya Okamoto	Roxanne Beck
Hassan	Aya Hisakawa	Veronica Shea
Leelince	Yumi Tōma	Amanda Goodman
King Fungun	Seizō Katō	Keith Howard
Zaginis Zoa	Tōru Furusawa	Greg Stuhr
Gelgog Aji	Akio Ōtsuka	
Ketta Keras	Tesshō Genda	Lee Moore
Towazzan		John Knox
Philocres	Tomomichi Nishimura	Harry Peerce Epstein
Euforio	Tarou Arakawa	David Fuhrer
Hendock	Hidenari Ugaki	Ben Coates
Domon	Hideyuki Umezu	Vincent Bagnall
Chifchi	Kiyoyuki Yanada	Sahaj
Migira		Peter Patrikios
Ondel		Sy Springer
Reijirou		Timothy Breese Miller
Undo N'gau	Masashi Ebara	Michael Goldwasser
Chris's Grandmother	Seiko Tomoe	

== Theme songs ==
WINGS OF MY HEART (Ending Theme)
Performance: Magesty
Lyrics: Shiro Sagisu
Composer/Arranger: Shiro Sagisu

== Media ==
=== Novels ===
No.	Title	Author	Publisher	Date	ISBN
1	A Byston Well Story Garzey's Wing (バイストン・ウェル物語 ガーゼィの翼)	Yoshiyuki Tomino	Aspect Corporation (株式会社アスペクト)	May 1995	9784893663603
2	A Byston Well Story Garzey's Wing 2 (バイストン・ウェル物語 ガーゼィの翼2)	Yoshiyuki Tomino	Aspect Corporation (株式会社アスペクト)	August 1995	9784893663979
3	A Byston Well Story Garzey's Wing 3 (バイストン・ウェル物語 ガーゼィの翼3)	Yoshiyuki Tomino	Aspect Corporation (株式会社アスペクト)	March 1996	9784893664686
4	A Byston Well Story Garzey's Wing 4 (バイストン・ウェル物語 ガーゼィの翼4)	Yoshiyuki Tomino	Aspect Corporation (株式会社アスペクト)	September 1996	9784893665799
5	A Byston Well Story Garzey's Wing 5 (バイストン・ウェル物語 ガーゼィの翼5)	Yoshiyuki Tomino	Aspect Corporation (株式会社アスペクト)	March 1997	9784893666673

== Related ==
- Aura Battler Dunbine and its sequel OVA also occur in the fictional land of Byston Well (technically, many centuries in the past; the chronologies of ABD and this anime do not match up).
