= Mobile Suit Gundam: Char's Counterattack =

1988 film by Yoshiyuki Tomino

- Theatrical release poster
- Directed by: Yoshiyuki Tomino
- Screenplay by: Yoshiyuki Tomino
- Story by: Yoshiyuki Tomino
- Based on: Mobile Suit Gundam by Hajime Yatate and Yoshiyuki Tomino
- Produced by: Kenji Uchida
- Starring: Shūichi Ikeda; Toru Furuya; Hirotaka Suzuoki; Maria Kawamura; Nozomu Sasaki; Kōichi Yamadera; Mitsuki Yayoi
- Music by: Shigeaki Saegusa
- Production company: Sunrise
- Distributed by: Shochiku
- Release date: March 12, 1988
- Running time: 119 minutes
- Country: Japan
- Language: Japanese
- Box office: ¥1.16 billion

Mobile Suit Gundam: Char's Counterattack (Japanese: 機動戦士ガンダム 逆襲のシャア, Hepburn: Kidō Senshi Gandamu Gyakushū no Shā) is a 1988 Japanese anime science fiction film directed and written by Yoshiyuki Tomino. It is set in the Universal Century timeline of the Gundam franchise. Featuring the talents of Shūichi Ikeda, Toru Furuya, Hirotaka Suzuoki, Maria Kawamura, Nozomu Sasaki, and Kōichi Yamadera, among others, it focuses on Char Aznable's attempt of genocide on the planet Earth by pushing the asteroid called Axis into a collision with the planet. As a result, Char's rival from the Earth Federation Amuro Ray tries to defeat him in combat and avoid a slaughter in the process.

In addition to being the first original Gundam theatrical release, Char's Counterattack was also the first Gundam production to make use of computer graphics during a five-second shot of the Sweetwater colony rotating in space, being made at Toyo Links. Char's Counterattack was released in North America on DVD on August 20, 2002, and was broadcast on January 4, 2003, on Cartoon Network's Adult Swim programming block.

Upon release, the film made a gross of ¥1.16 billion in Japan. The film was praised for its production values, though the rivalry between the two leads earned mixed responses for being recycled from the original 1979 television series. Director Yoshiyuki Tomino also expressed doubts about the film he directed in retrospective. Nevertheless, Tomino wrote another novel known as Beltorchika's Children which focuses more on Amuro's personal life and was adapted into a manga series.

== Plot ==
In UC 0093, Char Aznable returns to prominence and leads Neo Zeon in battle against the Earth Federation, aiming to plunge Earth into a nuclear winter by dropping asteroids to progress humanity's evolution as Newtypes. A Federation task force called Londo Bell, which includes Bright Noa and Char's rival Amuro Ray, engages Neo Zeon during an asteroid drop operation at Fifth Luna. Amuro fights Char but is forced to withdraw due to Char's superior abilities in his MSN-04 Sazabi mobile suit, as Fifth Luna successfully collides with Lhasa.

On Earth, Federation Vice Minister Adenauer Paraya and his rebellious daughter Quess narrowly escape Fifth Luna's collision on a shuttle, bringing along Bright's son Hathaway who develops a crush on Quess. They rendezvous with Londo Bell's command ship, the Ra Cailum, and head for the space colony Londenion per Adenauer's request. During the journey, Amuro works with close friend and engineer Chan Agi to fine-tune the psycoframe of his custom mobile suit, the RX-93 v Gundam (pronounced "Nu Gundam"). Hathaway and Quess discuss Char's willingness to destroy Earth despite having allied with the Federation in the past, (Note: As depicted in Mobile Suit Zeta Gundam) and Quess resonates with his motives, leaving Hathaway skeptical.

Arriving in Londenion, Adenauer and the Federation secretly negotiate a peace treaty with Char, granting him the former mining asteroid Axis. (Note: Axis had been abandoned by Neo Zeon following the events of Mobile Suit Gundam ZZ) While relaxing in the colony with Quess and Hathaway, Amuro recognizes Char and attacks him. Quess betrays Amuro and leaves with Char, much to Hathaway's distress. Sensing her potential, Char begins manipulating Quess, learning that she is a powerful Newtype. Char announces to Neo Zeon that the treaty is a ruse to gain control of Axis and sets its trajectory for a collision with Earth. Neo Zeon ambushes and cripples a Federation fleet, which Quess participates in and kills Adenauer as her mental state further deteriorates.

With Londo Bell left to fend themselves, Bright leads the task force to stop Axis by any means necessary. Hathaway begs to join to save Quess, but Amuro stops him out of fear for his safety as he deploys in the hastily developed Gundam. Neo Zeon thwarts Londo Bell's attempts to destroy Axis, while an emotionally unstable Quess meets with Char, who instructs her to continue fighting. Quess descends into violence as she fights Londo Bell and the Gundam. Hathaway sneaks onto the battlefield and tries convincing Quess to stop fighting. Before Quess can aim her weapons at Hathaway, Chan kills her to protect him, causing a traumatized and enraged Hathaway to kill Chan in return.

As Londo Bell and Neo Zeon sustain heavy losses, Amuro and Char duel each other to settle their grievances, and Char reveals he secretly helped in contributing to the Gundam's psycoframe out of a desire to evenly match Amuro. Bright and the Ra Cailum land on Axis to plant explosive charges. Char attempts to stop Amuro inside Axis when Amuro is informed that the asteroid is rigged to blow. Both men escape in time as the charges detonate, tearing Axis in two. Amuro gains the upper hand and defeats the Sazabi, taking Char's escape pod captive. However, Londo Bell realizes that one half of Axis is still aiming for Earth.

Char ridicules Amuro's failure to stop Axis, though Amuro is determined to push the asteroid away using the Gundam. Amuro's refusal to give up hope is seen by the pilots of both sides, who respond by joining him in the attempt to stop Axis, but it is not enough. As Amuro and Char argue on their philosophies, a massive amount of energy emanating from the psycoframes of the Gundam and Char's escape pod is formed from the collective will of humanity. The psycoframes overload and release the energy, engulfing both men in a stream of light and successfully diverting Axis' descent. Amuro and Char vanish in the phenomenon, as Bright, Hathaway, and the people of Earth watch the resulting aurora in awe.

== Production and development ==
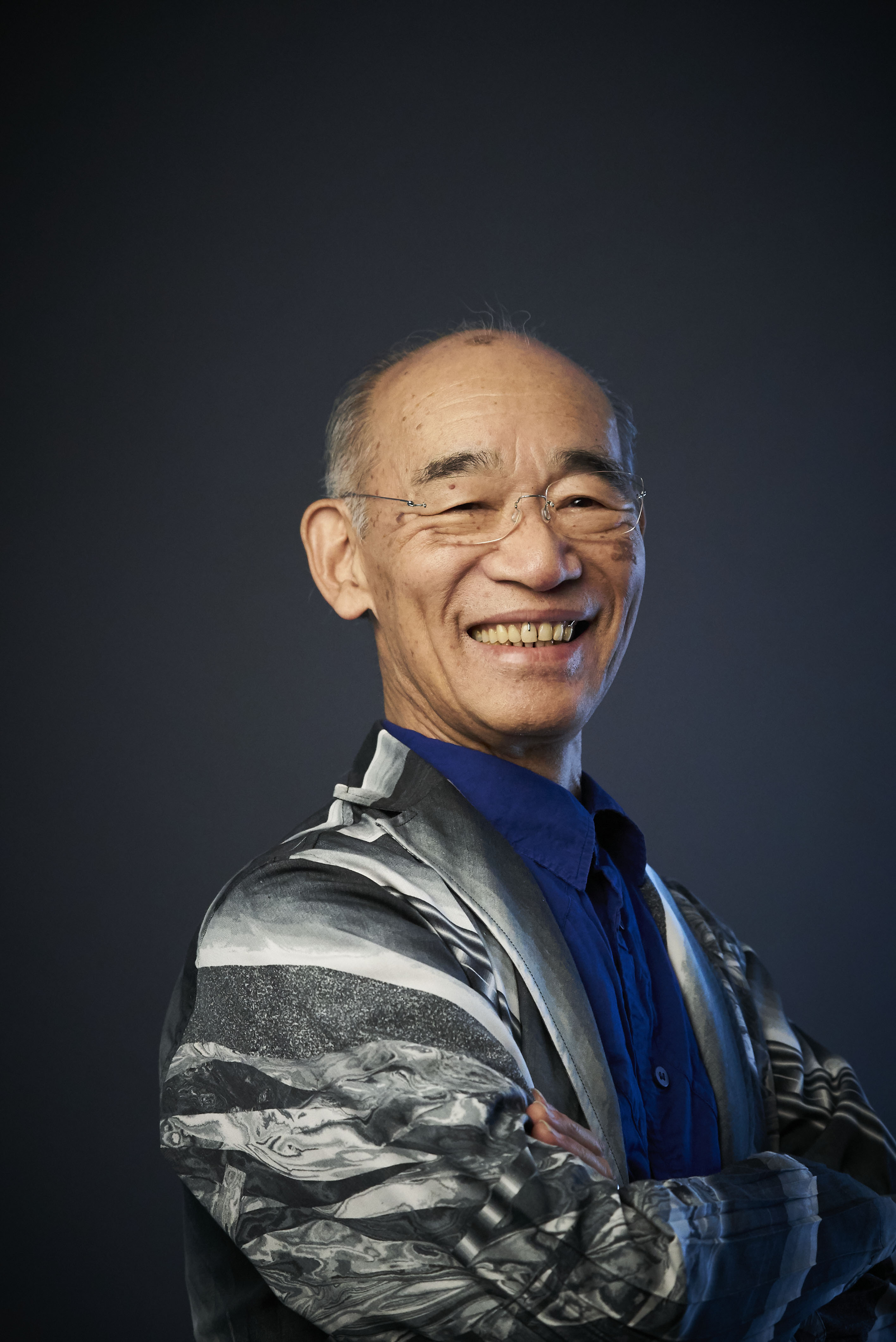
Director and writer Yoshiyuki Tomino

After the production of Mobile Suit Gundam ZZ, the movie was planned in response to fan desire for a conclusion to the rivalry between Amuro Ray and Char Aznable. The film was originally planned to be released in January 1988.

The movie was directed and written by Yoshiyuki Tomino. The first draft of the script was over two hours long and featured Beltorchika Irma, Amuro's partner from Zeta Gundam, now married to him. Concerns were raised over whether it was appropriate for a robot anime to have a married main character. In subsequent drafts, Beltorchika was removed and her role was filled by two new characters, Chan Agi and Quess Paraya. The character Mineva Lao Zabi, who had appeared in Zeta Gundam and Gundam ZZ, was also omitted as her presence would have made the story overly complicated. The original draft of the story was adapted by Tomino into a 1988 novelization entitled Mobile Suit Gundam: Char's Counterattack - Beltorchika's Children (機動戦士ガンダム 逆襲のシャア―ベルトーチカ・チルドレン, Kidō Senshi Gandamu: Gyakushū no Sha Berutoruchika Chirudoren). Notably, this novelization featured a new revision of the v Gundam design later dubbed the Hi-v Gundam (read "Hi-Nu" Gundam), and replaced Char's Sazabi with a new Mobile Suit named the Nightingale. The novelization itself lead to a trilogy of novels by Tomino entitled Mobile Suit Gundam: Hathaway's Flash released between 1989 and 1990.

Tomino began storyboarding in April 1987, one month behind schedule, and the final cut was completed on September 6.

=== Animation ===
CG animation was used to depict the Space Colony Side 1's Londenion and Side 5's Sweetwater, due to the structures' intricate detail and rotation. CG designer Hideki Nakano spent three months on the one-and-a-half minute scene to make sure that the immense size of the colony would be properly conveyed in theaters.

Original Mobile Suit Gundam character designer Yoshikazu Yasuhiko decided not to participate in the project, and the job was instead given to Mobile Suit Gundam ZZ designer Hiroyuki Kitazume. During the design process, he didn't have enough time to talk with Director Tomino, so it was decided that Director Tomino would select rough sketches of characters drawn by Kitazume. Tomino didn't give any specific instructions about the design, but said, "I want you to avoid becoming a manga in order to draw a human drama." Kitazume tried to create a design that could show human facial expressions, but even during the design, Director Tomino said that the length of the neck of the character as a whole should be designed with Western actors in mind, not Japanese, "The jaw line is below the shoulders."

Mechanical Design's design work includes Yutaka Izubuchi, Yoshinori Sayama, Masahisa Suzuki, and Kazunobu Nakazawa. The design of the mobile suit was competed in a competition similar to Mobile Suit Zeta Gundam and Gundam ZZ. In this work, gimmicks such as transformation and combination were not added to the MS, and the size itself was increased The flow of heavy armament that continued until the previous work has stopped, and simple humanoid aircraft are the center. Masahisa Suzuki and others submitted numerous rough designs for the main characters. ν Gundam, Re-GZ, Jegan, and other Earth Federation Forces mobile suits. Yutaka Izubuchi designed the Neo Zeon mobile suits. Director Tomino had two requests regarding the main character's ν Gundam: "I want to put a cape on the Gundam" and "I don't want the Gundam itself to transform or combine."

Initially, it was decided that Mamoru Nagano would be appointed as the main mechanical designer for this work. Director Tomino said, "It's not a TV series, so I'll entrust all the designs to you." He was in charge of almost all designs in the play, such as enemy and ally MS and ships, cockpits, MS control systems, and Psycommu helmets. It was considered under the condition that the mecha that appeared in the previous work (First Gundam, Z, ZZ) would not be used at all, but the design line proposed in response to Director Tomino's request. The Gundam was also progressing with a design line that overturned the so-called Gundam common sense was not liked by the client, and he himself clashed with the staff around him, so he had to drop out halfway through the previous work Gundam ZZ. For that reason, all the designs were redone at the stage of trial drawing to see if it would be reflected in the actual drawing, and although the concept was the same, Nagano's design itself did not appear in the work at all. In later years, Nagano said that he had quit the Gundam series three times in a row, including this one, saying, "There are so many things I don't want to remember."

The design of the mobile suit was quickly put into a competition format, and producer Shigeru Watanabe of Bandai Visual and Kenji Uchida of Sunrise (animation production brand Sunrise) called out to me. In addition to the aforementioned designers, Hidetoshi Omori, Hideaki Anno, Makoto Kobayashi and many other people participated. The designers drew many roughs without any particular restrictions, and as a result, it was decided that Yutaka Izubuchi would lead the design Most mechanics other than the MS were outsourced to Gainax. Gainax took over as a company, and the actual design was handled by Hideaki Anno for Neo Zeon and Shoichi Masuo for the Federation Forces., Cleanup was done by Seimi Tanaka. In addition, Yoshiyuki Sadamoto also participated in the design of the normal suit Anno also participated in the νGundam design competition, and submitted a Gundam that was almost identical to the cleanup manuscript of Yoshikazu Yasuhiko, the animation director of the first Gundam. proposed to reduce the amount of lines in MS. The work was almost completed around June 1987, and Hideaki Anno later interviewed and initially proceeded with the design to return to the taste of the first Gundam, but director Tomino decided to return to "Zeta Gundam" and "Gundam ZZ". He felt that the image of the design was evolving through the process, and revealed that he had a hard time resolving the gap himself. There were a number of requests, such as "to clearly show where the building is," and "to design with people living in mind at all times." Describes his impression of participating as a designer.

Yutaka Izubuchi, who joined in the middle of the production, had little time to work on this work, and although he could not do much adventure related to design, since the time of Aura Battler Dunbine, he has been a substitute hitter when he was in trouble. After prefaced that there was also a habit of being appointed, "We were able to provide material that felt different from the TV series," "We suppressed the expression method of the TV series and expressed it with an orthodox taste," and "The movements of the mobile suits were recreated in the days of the first Gundam. Aiming for a simple and beautiful design that can be endured.". In addition, when we adopted the elements of special effects heroes in some designs, Director Tomino liked it, and it was reflected in the normal suits of Char Aznable and Quess Paraya.

Yoshinori Sayama, who was only scheduled to participate in the mobile suit design cleanup, ended up being in charge of some mecha designs as well, but there was a rough sketch drawn by Yutaka Izubuchi, so that was the base. I was able to respond to the order for the supplementary mechanism. And after revealing that "the biggest harvest was being able to work with Mr. Izubuchi," he said that he learned the tricks of the design work and was a great reference. On the other hand, unlike the TV series, there are no restrictions, and at first I was confused by the design for the theater where there was NG in the Gundam-like design, and I had to design it by assimilating the world view of Gundam myself. On the other hand, Director Tomino demanded a versatile design that matches the place of use and demands. However, it was also a work that made me think about "what is the way to draw in terms of setting?" and made me realize that it is necessary to think about settings from the standpoint of animators who work on site.

Regarding the brightness of the stage, director Tomino said, "The story is dark, so make it brighter." The setting used in Mobile Suit Gundam ZZ, "The computer is making outer space look brighter," is also used in this work, and only the outer space projected from the cockpit is brightly projected. As for the space colony, avoiding future-oriented designs, it was designed as an artificial city with an atmosphere that would not cause frustration even if people lived a normal life. Specifically, Sweet Water is based on the old streets of New York that Ikeda visited for location scouting. Regarding this colony, Director Tomino also gave several instructions to make the mirror part white, but Ikeda insisted that "it looks like a mirror because it reflects the sun's light." Since Director Tomino accepted this, the colony's mirror in this work was set to reflect like a mirror. Also, at that time, it was customary for the art team to design the interior of the mecha, and Ikeda drew up the interior design of the Federation and Neo Zeon battleships. Regarding the battle bridge, Director Tomino told Ikeda that the actual battleship bridge is divided into navigation and combat, and it was set in this work.

Ikeda was asked by Director Tomino to create a profound feeling for this work, but he was concerned that setting the outer space displayed on the monitor bright would create a light impression, so he worked hard to create a contradictory setting of "bright and profound". Made up. Regarding the layout balance due to the difference in the frame size peculiar to the theatrical version (this work is Vista size), since the frame of the TV version has a lot of space, adjustments were made so that it would not be noisy.

=== Character designer ===
In response to Yoshikazu Yasuhiko's non-participation, Hiroyuki Kitazume, who also serves as character designer, and Hidetoshi Omori worked together as animation directors at first, but due to their lack of experience, the progress of the work quickly stalled, and production began. For four months from the start, not even one cut was raised, so new Nobuyoshi Inano, Mikio Odagawa, Takatsuna Senba, Shinichiro Minami, Yamada Kisaraka joined, and it became a situation where seven animation directors jointly named. Director Yoshiyuki Tomino, citing the fact that there was no animation director comparable to Yoshikazu Yasuhiko, explained that If the first four months were going well, the degree of perfection would have been higher. He said that he was guilty of not being able to see through the situation, and said, "I'm sorry for putting pressure on young people." 2400 shots were cut at the storyboard stage, but were reduced to 2100 shots at the time of completion.

Hiroyuki Kitazume, who was one of the animation directors, was in charge of animation supervision and layout checking for the key animation team he was in charge of, as well as retakes for the parts ordered from overseas subcontractors, but he himself did not draw a single key animation and was in charge of the work. Most of the time was spent on layout checks. During a meeting with Director Tomino, at the beginning there was only one layout for each scene, and it was pointed out that " can't understand the flow of the play with this," As a result of repeating a series of processes of submitting a rough drawing and sending it back with an order from Director Tomino, it took a lot of time, and Kitazume decided to do all the layout checks by himself.

Hidetoshi Omori, who was also one of the animation directors, was initially involved in the production as mechanical animation director, but was actually in charge of animation checks for natural phenomena such as weapon effects and vernier injection. Director Tomino's strong intentions are reflected in everything, Regarding the beam saber, it is not the conventional when the particles collide with each other due to interference, the particle with the weaker output generates a spherical effect. Specifically, the particles of the beam saber are made to shine with transmitted light, and a complicated expression method is used to blow a brush over it. Also, regarding the depiction of the rifle's beam, instead of light like a laser, I tried to depict fine particles with mass that pierce the target. In order to prevent this from happening, I made notes on drawing explosions and made them known to animators. In order to give an even greater sense of speed, the muzzle casts a shadow instead of a reflection when the beam is fired As for the funnel, Omori is in charge of all cuts, "It's the element that gives the most sense of speed and makes the scene interesting." As a monthly new type, P45, in order to create a sense of dynamism, in addition to depictions that move faster than mobile suit, α-Azieru's large funnel and ν Gundam's fin funnels and other vernier mechanisms have different movements and rotations.

In this work, Tomino directed the production of Oomoto, assisted by Toshifumi Kawase and Shinji Takamatsu. Specifically, Tomino presents a rough outline of the play as a storyboard, and after the director checks the original drawing that was drawn based on that, Kawase, the assistant director, makes fine color adjustments and adjusts the length of the dialogue. Takamatsu checked the shooting for each cut that combined the image and the background. Kawase, who was working on a theatrical work for the first time, was perplexed that the number of cels would take more than he expected. It didn't work at all, and it was Takamatsu's second theatrical work following Dirty Pair, but due to the adverse effects of getting used to the pace of the TV series, the picture with the movie version. Struggling with differences in production, animators also tended to draw close-up key animations with the feeling of the TV version, and there were many retakes of the pull size.

=== Music ===
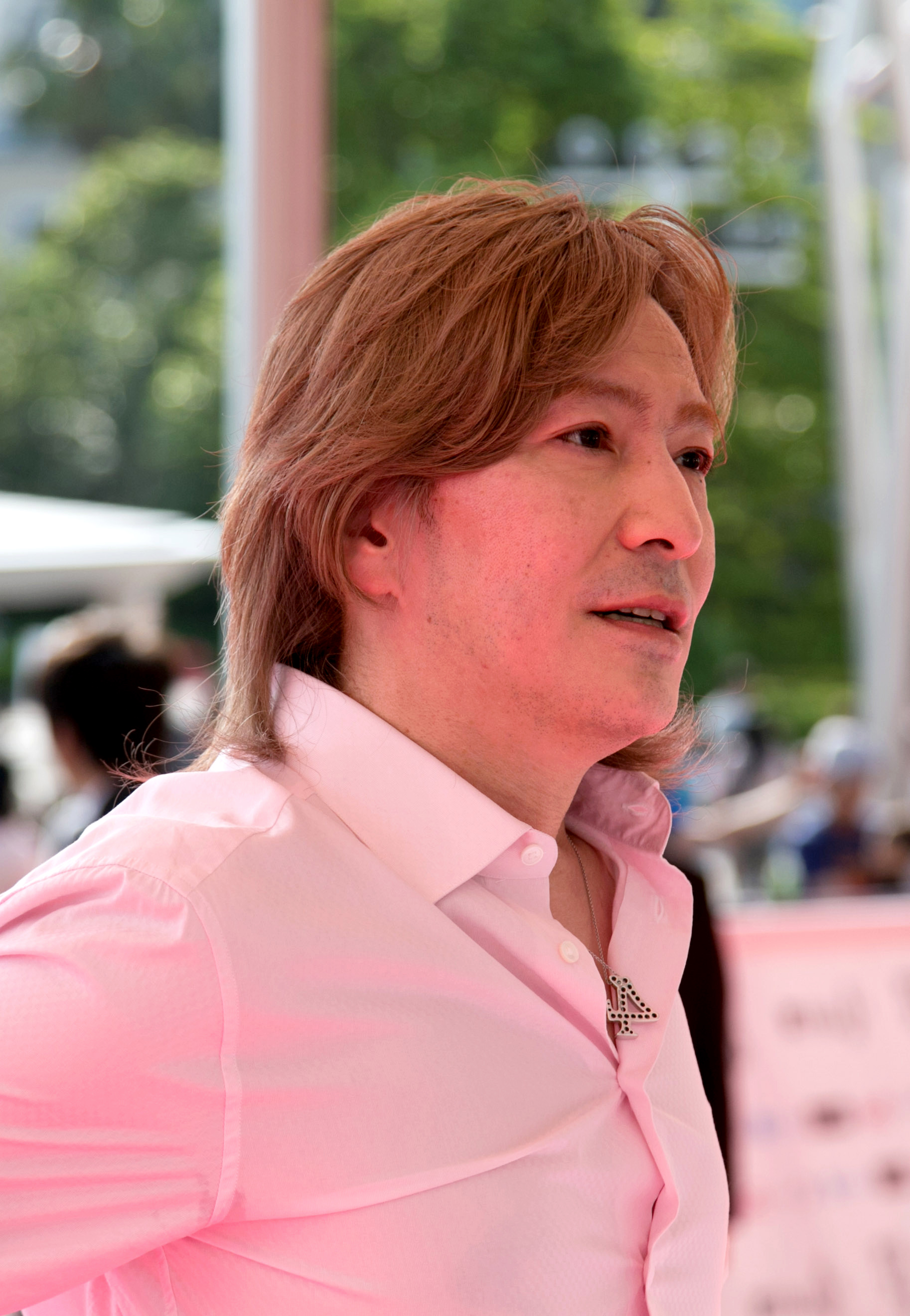
Komuro in 2014

Shigeaki Saegusa, who has pitched three consecutive titles since "Mobile Suit Zeta Gundam", said, "It's difficult to create an easy-to-understand melody in the world of Gundam, where right and wrong are not clearly defined." While stating the difficulty, in this work, I dared to try to make an easy-to-understand melody that I had avoided until now, and Char Aznable was a defender of Richard Wagner in the late romantic school, Ludwig II. The music was produced with the image of Char's Counterattack.

Ending:

- "Beyond the Time ~Möbius no sora wo koete~" (Beyond the Time ～メビウスの宇宙を越えて～, Beyond the Time ~ Mebiusu no sora wo koete; Beyond the Time ~Beyond the Möbius Universe~)
  - Lyrics: Mitsuko Komuro
  - Composition Arrangement: Tetsuya Komuro
  - Artist: TM Network (Tetsuya Komuro, Takashi Utsunomiya and Naoto Kine)

The recording was done during the tour "Kiss Japan TM Network Tour '87-'88" that was going on at the time, and was completed in September 1987, immediately after the tour ended. was released to. Komuro created a backtrack from the vague theme of "the dream of all mankind = something with a cosmic expanse", the lyricist Mitsuko Komuro watched the anime version of Gundam video given to him by a person involved, saying, "Humans repeat sins" and "Freedom and In the end, humans fight for "someone they personally love" rather than the just cause of "peace".

The single peaked at No. 4 on Oricon's singles chart. It was nominated for the Gold Award at the 30th Japan Record Awards. In 2018, the song was ranked No. 4 on NHK's "Announcement! All Gundam Big Vote" (発表!全ガンダム大投票, Happyō! Zen Gandamu Dai Tōhyō).

=== Casting ===
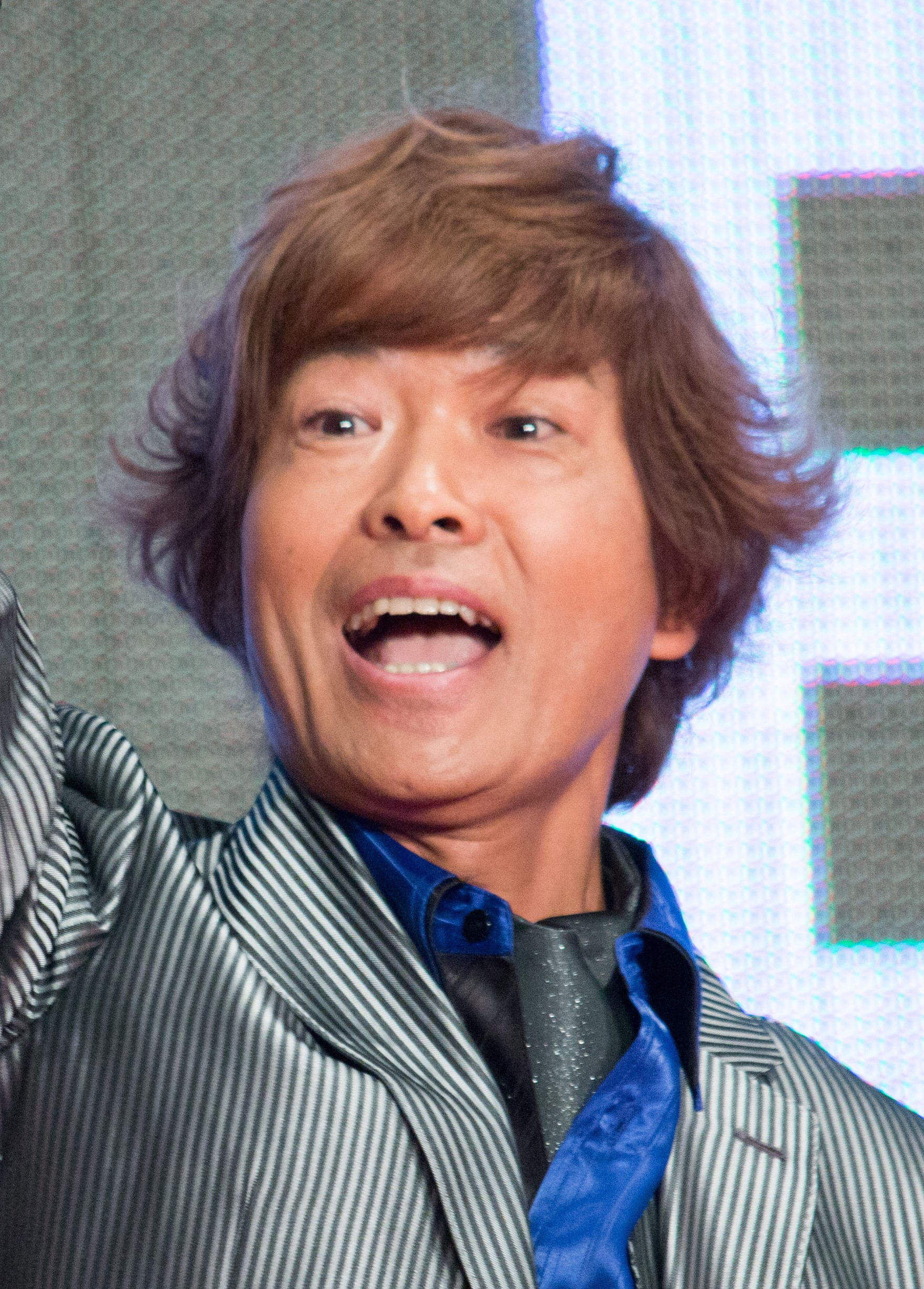
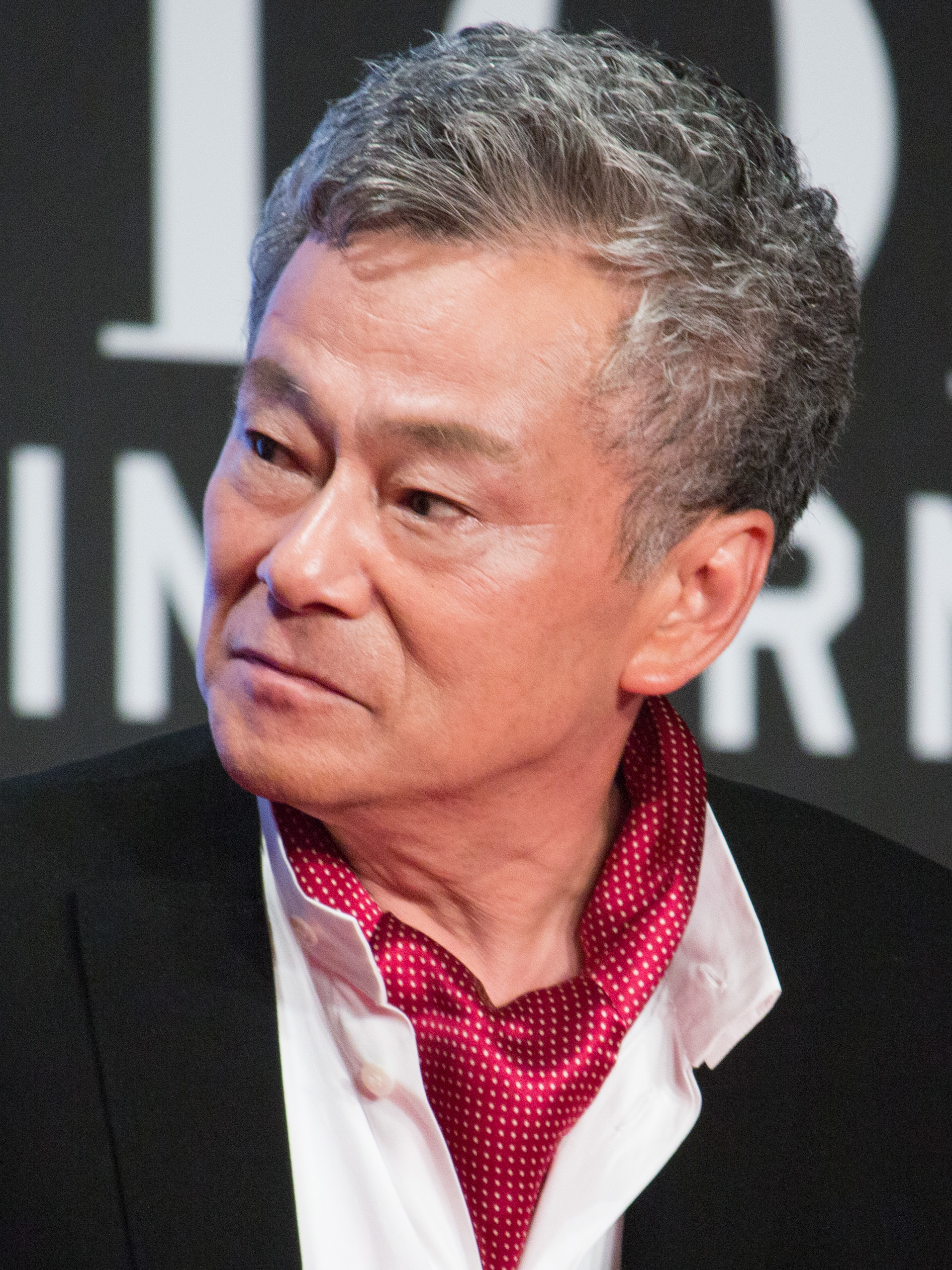
Toru Furuya (left) and Shuichi Ikeda (right) returned to voice Amuro and Char, respectively.

For the voice actors who will be in charge of the new characters in this work, the director Yoshiyuki Tomino actually listened to the audition tapes of more than 80 people and selected them. Together, for three days from January 22 to 24, 1988, recording was held at the 101AR studio of Tokyo Television Center in Hamamatsucho, Nihonbashi., but in reality, due to budget and guarantees, 3 days restraint is the limit, and voice actors perform similar performances.

Yoshiyuki Tomino said, "The range of voice actors has narrowed, and I realized that we have to create a world where we can work with actors with different characteristics." Also, for the voice actors on the day of dubbing, there was strong acting guidance for Maria Kawamura, who played the role of Quess Palaya, and Nozomu Sasaki, who played the role of Hathaway Noah. Toru Furuya, who played the role of Amuro Ray, Shuichi Ikeda, who played the role of Char Aznable, and Hirotaka Suzuoki, who played the role of Bright Noah.

Shuichi Ikeda, who plays Char Aznable, approached the recording with the feeling that this work was the culmination of the nine years of the Gundam series, and interpreted that Char died as the end of the story. Also, in a later interview, Ikeda said about his own play at the time of recording, "There was a momentum to finish everything because it was the last time.

Toru Furuya, who plays the role of Amuro Ray, is close to his own age (35 years old) at the time of recording (29 years old), so he tried to act like an adult with a sense of responsibility. Since Amuro had not yet appeared, it was unclear how his mental state in Zeta Gundam led to his resurrection in this work. It is said that until the recording of the scene involving Agi (the scene where Chan holds her knees in front of Amuro's room and waits while floating), he was dragging the youthful part of "Zeta Gundam". Furuya talks about Beltorchika Irma, Amuro's partner who ended up not appearing, and although she was a necessary existence for Amuro in the days of "Zeta Gundam", she was not an ideal partner and instead that Chan Agi is Amuro's ideal partner. In a later interview, he said that he interpreted it as a close existence, and that such feelings subconsciously appeared in the play.

Mitsuki Yayoi, who plays the role of Chan Agi, was troubled by the onomatopoeic expressions peculiar to voice actors in addition to being her second theatrical animation voice role following "Royal Space Force Honneamise no Tsubasa", and had to do retakes many times. Tōru Furuya, who played Amuro, went to support and helped with her recordings.

Character	Japanese voice actor	English dubbing actor (Bandai Entertainment, 2002)
Amuro Ray	Tōru Furuya	Brad Swaile
Char Aznable	Shūichi Ikeda	Michael Kopsa
Bright Noa	Hirotaka Suzuoki	Chris Kalhoon
Quess Paraya	Maria Kawamura	Jocelyne Loewen
Hathaway Noa	Nozomu Sasaki	Bill Switzer
Gyunei Guss	Kōichi Yamadera	Kirby Morrow
Nanai Miguel	Yoshiko Sakakibara	Jenn Forgie
Chan Agi	Mitsuki Yayoi	Nicole Leroux
Mirai Noa (née Yashima)	Fuyumi Shiraishi	Cathy Weseluck
Cheimin Noa	Mayumi Shō	Alaina Burnett
Cameron Bloom	Akira Murayama	David Mackay
Lalah Sune	Keiko Han	Willow Johnson

== Release ==
At the Japanese box office, the film sold 1.3 million tickets and grossed ¥1.16 billion.

The film made its American debut on August 20, 2002, on DVD and was later re-released during Sunrise's release of its One Year War properties (specifically Mobile Suit Gundam, 08th MS Team, 0080, and 0083).

As part of the 40th anniversary celebration of the Gundam franchise, Char's Counterattack played in select theaters in the U.S. on December 5, 2019.

=== Home media ===
Bandai released a DVD of the film on August 20, 2002. The product was a maroon slipcase edition embossed with the gold Neo Zeon logo. The DVD was later reissued as part of the Anime Legends line in 2006. Due to the closure of Bandai Entertainment, the film has been out of print for sometime. On October 11, 2014, at their 2014 New York Comic Con panel, Sunrise announced they will be releasing all of the Gundam franchise, including Gundam SEED: Special Edition in North America though distribution from Right Stuf Inc., beginning in Spring 2015.

By 2008, the film had sold 300,000 units on DVD.

=== Critical response ===
Allen Divers from Anime News Network found Amuro and Char's final duel the most important part from Char's Counterattack, the lack of resolution of their rivalry made the film unfulfilling. THEM Anime Reviews' Carlo Ross saw that while Amuro was overshadowed by Char, he is still an "earnest, well-meaning, and heroic character in his own right." On the other hand, J. Doyle Wallis criticized their rivalry in the film considering it a "rehash" of the events of the television series. In a later review, Anime News Network panned the handling of Quess being nearly an audience surrogate as most of her screetime is less entertaining than the one involving the protagonists and makes Char far more unlikable in the process for using a child soldier. Char manipulates Quess into becoming his soldier during disturbing regardless of request which gives his character a disturbing portrayal especially with the notorious agegap. Anime UK News did not find the film entertaining but instead sad for ending Amuro and Char's long stories despite being one of the most famous franchises ever with Bright's sub-plot coming across as unimportant in the process. FandomPost found Char's villain traits out-of-character as a result of how heroic he became in Zeta Gundam and, like other writers, criticized the handling of Quess.

Animerica enjoyed the continuous rivalry of the two leads, as they are quite iconic within the anime fandom despite having abandoned such rivalry in favor of a friendship during Mobile Suit Zeta Gundam. They also praised the production for giving Yutaka Izubuchi the "honor" of creating Amuro's RX-93 ν Gundam as well as the outsourcing to the Gainax studio for providing several new types of mechas and ships. By 2017, Anime News Network found that the animation of the film was highly appealing, especially with the handling of its Blu-ray release even if there are sometimes marks that show the difficulties the animators went through with creating the film. The Fandom Post found the animation as the film's biggest strength due to the focus on the key animation.

Paste listed the movie as the 31st best anime film of all time, labeling it as the best Gundam movie. The writer praised the animation and fight sequences, most notably the ones from Amuro and Char but lamented that non-fans would struggle to find something to invest themselves in.

While initially describing Amuro as a relatable character to general view of otaku, Journal of Anime and Manga Studies said the one from Char's Counterattack instead comes across as a war hero while still being popular. In Char's Counterattack, it is not until Amuro re engineers the RX-93 with the psycho frame system that he is able to battle Char on equal footing. This handling of Gundams was compared to that of Formula 1 drivers and their own race cars, a connection that still holds for the film. The macro-action of Char's Counterattack briefly pauses whenever pilots are forced to dock mid-battle in order to attend to repairs and refueling. Such specific attention to the details of the mobile suits in the movie simultaneously be re-created in the model kits that would be released after the film's debut. As one of the final installments from the Universal Century timeline created by Tomino, the impact of the narrative would result in several anime writers creating new characters that would attempt to recreate Amuro's legacy alongside fans.

In later years, when interviewed during the production of ∀ Gundam, director Yoshiyuki Tomino replied that he "has no recollection of making it as a movie". In addition, he was disgusted by the sight of Sunrise's management and investors such as Bandai looking at this work as content that could be sold in half a year. Even the words of Bandai's president, Makoto Yamashina, who expressed his impressions after the preview, made him feel "very lonely."

== Legacy ==
=== Novels ===
Two publishers each printed a different Char's Counterattack book version by writer and director Yoshiyuki Tomino before the release of the movie. The first was prepublished as Hi-Streamer in Animage starting its May 1987 issue, with Tomino initially attempting to separate it from the Gundam intellectual property, and later reedited as High-Streamer. The second one, published with the Beltorchika's Children subtitle, was based on the first draft of the movie.

No.	Title	Author	Publisher	Date	ISBN
1	Mobile Suit Gundam: Char's Counterattack First Chapter (機動戦士ガンダム 逆襲のシャア 前篇)	Yoshiyuki Tomino	Tokuma Shoten	December 1987	9784196695707
2	Mobile Suit Gundam: Char's Counterattack Middle Chapter (機動戦士ガンダム 逆襲のシャア 中篇)	Yoshiyuki Tomino	Tokuma Shoten	February 1988	9784196695752
3	Mobile Suit Gundam: Char's Counterattack Final Chapter (機動戦士ガンダム 逆襲のシャア 後篇)	Yoshiyuki Tomino	Tokuma Shoten	March 1988	9784196695783
4	Mobile Suit Gundam: Char's Counterattack - Beltorchika's Children (機動戦士ガンダム 逆襲のシャア ベルトーチカ・チルドレン)	Yoshiyuki Tomino	Kadokawa Shoten	February 2, 1988	9784044101091

=== Game ===
Bandai produced a Char's Counterattack 3D fighting game for the PlayStation in 1998 as part of the Big Bang Project for Gundam's 20th anniversary. The game featured scenes from the film that were remade with updated animation and CGI. The game also has stages featuring Amuro and Char's classic encounters in the original Mobile Suit Gundam series.

=== Toys/Models ===
A line of Gunpla models based on the film's mobile suits was released via Bandai, along with a Hobby Japan special. The model line had 1/144 kits of the Re-GZ, the Jegan, the Geara Doga, the Sazabi, Gyunei Guss and Quess Paraya's Jagd Dogas, and the ν Gundam (with and without Fin Funnel), a 1/550 α-Azieru, and a 1/100 ν Gundam. Bandai would re-release them plus the Hi-ν Gundam and a heavy weapons version of the ν Gundam, years later as part of the HGUC and Master Grade lines, the latter being featured in Bandai's Gundam Weapons line of mooks. Many of them are also available as part of the B-Club resin line. In 2011, a model kit manufacturer in China, MCModel, produced 1/144 scale kits of the ν Gundam and Hi-ν Gundam called "Gundooms" that are reportedly much more detailed than the same kits from Bandai based on their origins as retooled versions of resin conversion kits. Another company, Regulation Center, later followed suit with a 1/100 Nightingale kit. Bandai's special museum contained a 1/100 prototype of the Nightingale; the company went public at the 2014 Shizuoka Hobby Show with the announcement of a new RE/100 category of scale models, with the Nightingale as the first release in September 2014.

Veteran mechanical designer Hajime Katoki redesigned the MG version of the Sazabi, resulting in a slightly blockier appearance more suitable for modeling. Due to the substantial size and heft, it is one of the most expensive 1/100-scale Master Grade kits yet manufactured, trumped only by the enormous Perfect Zeong kit, released in 2004. The ν Gundam, Hi-ν Gundam, and Sazabi would be released as part of Katoki's Ver. Ka line of redesigned Gunpla model kits, their most noticeable design cues being splitting panels designed to show off the psycoframe in the v Gundam, and the internal frame structure in the Sazabi.

The ν Gundam and Sazabi were the first offerings in Bandai's "Formania" line of extensively detailed machine busts in September 2010.

Some of the film's units were also released as action figures, with the RX-93 and the Sazabi produced in various forms, the latest of which being under the Robot Spirits line. Bandai, in particular, produced an online-exclusive RX-93 equipment set featuring a second set of Fin-Funnels and a Fin-Funnel equipment set that includes effect parts to recreate the ν-Gundam's beam pyramid. A version of the ν-Gundam produced for the Taiwanese market has a special psycho-frame effect where parts of the body are molded in crystal green. Bandai released the Hi-ν in early 2014 and is slated to release the unit as part of the Metal Robot Spirits line, a version of regular Robot Spirits figures using diecast metal parts.

=== Manga ===
Two manga adaptations of the film were released, one by Toshiya Murakami in April and May 1988, and another by Kōichi Tokita from October 1998 to February 1999. A manga adaptation of Beltorchika's Children, illustrated by Sabishi Uroaki and Takayuki Yanase was published in Gundam Ace from June 2014 to March 2018 issues and compiled into seven volumes.

Denpa licensed the Beltorchika's Children manga in North America.

== Notes ==
Preceded by Mobile Suit Gundam ZZ	Gundam metaseries (production order); 1988	Succeeded by Mobile Suit SD Gundam
Preceded by Mobile Suit Gundam ZZ	Gundam Universal Century timeline U.C. 0093	Succeeded by Mobile Suit Gundam Unicorn
