= The Wings of Rean =

Japanese light novel and anime series

リーンの翼 (Rīn no Tsubasa)
- Genre: mecha steampunk science fantasy
- Light novel
- Written by: Yoshiyuki Tomino
- Published by: Kadokawa Shoten
- Original run: 1983 – 1986
- Volumes: 6
- Original net animation
- Directed by: Yoshiyuki Tomino
- Written by: Jiro Takayama; Yoshiyuki Tomino
- Studio: Sunrise
- Licensed by: NA: Bandai Visual
- Released: December 16, 2005 – August 18, 2006
- Runtime: 30 minutes
- Episodes: 6
- icon

The Wings of Rean (リーンの翼, Rīn no Tsubasa) is a light novel series by Yoshiyuki Tomino published from 1983 to 1986, and a six-episode ONA, released by Bandai Channel online from December 12, 2005, to August 18, 2006. It is an alternate story to another series, Aura Battler Dunbine, and is set in modern Japan and Byston Well in a timeline of its own. The characters were designed by Masashi Kudo. The ONA has an original plot but can be seen as a sequel to the light novels due to the return of their protagonist Shinjirō Sakomizu.

== Plot ==
Because his friends fired a rocket into the US Army camp, Suzuki was wanted by the US Army and the police. While he was running away the sea surface suddenly rose, and when a brilliant light appeared he saw a strange-looking battleship flying in the air. He was dumped into the sea and when he crawled onto the battleship there was a beautiful girl standing there. She said her name was Luxe, the princess of another world, and added "My father is Japanese, Shinjirou Sakomizu. Please help me, Suzuki".

== Characters ==
=== 2006 anime ===
Asap Suzuki (エイサップ鈴木)
Asap is the protagonist of the series, named after the acronym ASAP. Asap eventually finds his way to pilot the Aura Battler, Nanajin. He is also a Holy Warrior.
Voiced by: Jun Fukuyama
Luxe Sakomizu (リュクス·サコミズ, Ryukusu Sakomizu)
Luxe is the daughter of King Sakomizu in Byston Well, who took the Wings of Rean to the surface world.
Voiced by: Yu Shimamura
Shinjirō Sakomizu (サコミズ·シンジロウ, Sakomizu Shinjirō)
A former World War II Imperial Japanese Ohka pilot, he is the ruler of the Hōjō house in Byston Well. His personal Aura Battler is the Oukaou. He is the Holy Warrior who was given the shoes of Wings of Rean.
Voiced by: Rikiya Koyama
Elebos (エレボス, Erebosu)
A Mi Ferario from Warra Carren realm of Byston Well.
Voiced by: Yui Horie
Rouri Yahan (矢藩朗利, Yahan Rouri)
A friend of Asap's, he fired a rocket at an American army camp with his friend Kanamoto. He becomes a Holy Warrior after becoming the pilot of new Aura Battler model Shinden.
Voiced by: Hiroshi Tsuchida
Heiji Kanamoto (金本平次, Kanamoto Heiji)
A friend of Asap and Rouri's, he helped Rouri shoot at the American army camp with a bazooka. He becomes a Holy Warrior like Rouri after becoming the pilot of a new Aura Battler model Shinden.
Voiced by: Shingo Tanabe
Amalgam Rudol (アマルガン・ルドル, Amarugan Rudoru)
Leader of the rebel army who fights against Sakomizu's tyranny.
Voiced by: Yutaka Nakano
Kiki Attel (キキ・アッテル, Kiki Atteru)
Amalgam's subordinate in rebel army.
Hebe Gettel (ヘベ・ゲッテル, Hebe Getteru)
Amalgam's subordinate in the rebel army.
Voiced by: Junko Minagawa

== List of episodes ==
No.	Title
1	"Uninvited One" "Manekazaru mono" (招かれざるもの)
2	"The King of Houjou" "Hōjō no Ō" (ホウジョウの王)
3	"Groundling Aura Force" "Chijōbito no Ōra Chikara" (地上人のオーラ力)
4	"The King's Designs" "Ō no Kankei" (王の奸計)
5	"Above Tokyo Bay" "Tōkyōwan" (東京湾)
6	"Sakura Tempest" "Ōka Arashi" (桜花嵐)

== Media ==
=== Theme songs ===
"MY FATE" (ending theme)
Performance: Anna Tsuchiya
Lyrics: ANNA
Composer/Arranger: Ayumi Miyazaki

=== Novels ===
No.	Title	Author	Publisher	Date	ISBN
1	The Wings of Rean 1: A Byston Well story (リーンの翼1 バイストン・ウェル物語より)	Yoshiyuki Tomino	Kadokawa Shoten	17 January 1984	9784047762015
2	The Wings of Rean 2: A Byston Well story (リーンの翼2 バイストン・ウェル物語より)	Yoshiyuki Tomino	Kadokawa Shoten	18 April 1984	9784047762022
3	The Wings of Rean 3: A Byston Well story (リーンの翼3 バイストン・ウェル物語より)	Yoshiyuki Tomino	Kadokawa Shoten	15 November 1984	9784047762039
4	The Wings of Rean 4: A Byston Well story (リーンの翼4 バイストン・ウェル物語より)	Yoshiyuki Tomino	Kadokawa Shoten	15 April 1985	9784047762046
5	The Wings of Rean 5: A Byston Well story (リーンの翼5 バイストン・ウェル物語より)	Yoshiyuki Tomino	Kadokawa Shoten	15 November 1985	9784047762053
6	The Wings of Rean 6: A Byston Well story (リーンの翼6 バイストン・ウェル物語より)	Yoshiyuki Tomino	Kadokawa Shoten	18 February 1986	9784047762060
