= Yoshiyuki Tomino =

Japanese anime creator, songwriter, screenwriter & novelist

- 富野 喜幸
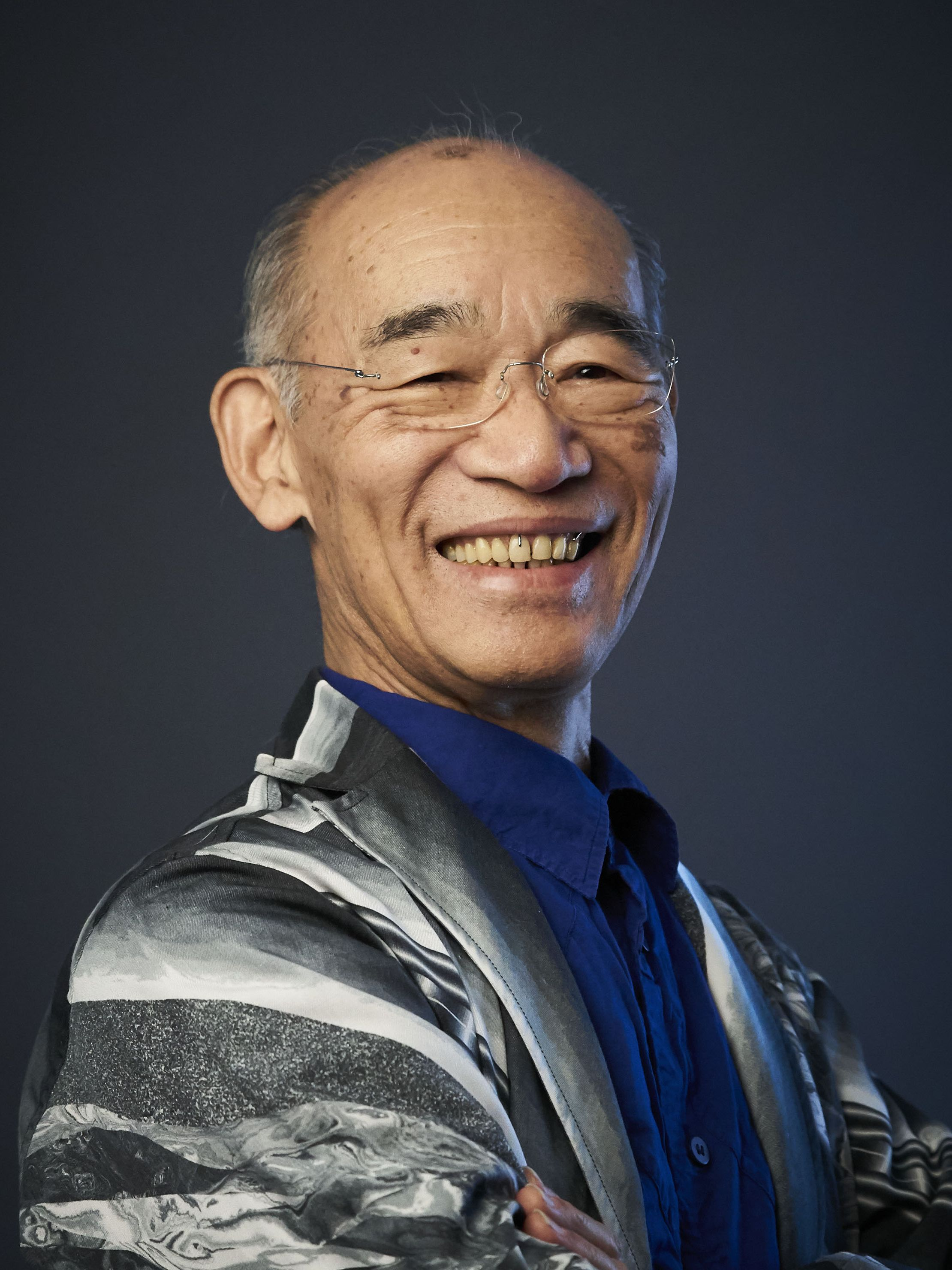
- Tomino in 2021
- Born: November 5, 1941 (age 84); Odawara, Kanagawa, Empire of Japan
- Other names: Rin Iogi; Minoru Yokitani; Minami Asa
- Education: Nihon University
- Occupations: Director, songwriter, screenwriter, novelist
- Years active: 1964–present
- Employer: Sunrise
- Known for: Gundam

Yoshiyuki Tomino (富野 由悠季, Tomino Yoshiyuki; born 富野 喜幸; November 5, 1941) is a Japanese anime director, screenwriter, songwriter and novelist best known for creating the Gundam anime franchise.

== Early life and family ==
Tomino was born on November 5, 1941, in Odawara, Kanagawa Prefecture, to an old family of regional landowners in Ōjima (in present-day Kōtō, Tokyo). His grandfather Kiheiji Tomino was the mayor of Ōjima and statutory auditor of Ōtsuka Rubber Works. His father Kihei Tomino was an employee at Japan Processed Fabrics, and his mother Sachiko was the daughter of town councillor and celluloid toy manufacturer Sakichi Tanaka. His uncle Kiheiji Tomino was a member of the Tokyo Prefectural Council.

Tomino's father Kihei aspired to become a photographer and studied art at the Nihon University. Kihei worked as a chemical engineer at the Odawara Arsenal developing pressurized suits for the Mitsubishi A6M Zero fighter plane during the Pacific War. Inspired by his father, Tomino dreamed of working in aerospace engineering, and later in engineering or mechanics. However, after failing the entrance exam to a technical high school, he was forced to switch to the humanities. He spent his senior year of high school studying the basics of story writing and practiced writing novels. He graduated from Sōyō High School.

Fascinated by the postwar influx of American science fiction films, he entered the film department of Nihon University College of Art.

== Career ==
Tomino joined Osamu Tezuka's company, Mushi Productions, on March 2, 1964, where he was originally a part of the production department and worked as a production assistant. One of Tomino's seniors was Hiroshi Wakao (later founder and CEO of Shaft), who had joined the company three months earlier; and it was Wakao who taught Tomino how to do jobs like collecting cut bags, filling out progress charts, and how to speak with the animators. Soon after, Tomino began drawing storyboards and writing screenplays for Astro Boy. He later became one of the most important members of the anime studio Sunrise, going on to direct numerous anime through the 1970s, 1980s and 1990s. Tomino is perhaps best known for his transformation of the "Super Robot" mecha anime genre into the "Real Robot" genre with 1979's Mobile Suit Gundam, the first in the Gundam franchise. He has also won numerous awards, including the "Best Director" award at the 2006 Tokyo International Anime Fair (for the 2005 film Mobile Suit Zeta Gundam: Heirs to the Stars). Two anime series directed by Tomino (Mobile Suit Gundam in 1979– 80 and Space Runaway Ideon in 1980) won the Animage Anime Grand Prix award.

Tomino is known for using numerous pseudonyms for miscellaneous staffing roles that he performs in his works, including Minami Asa (阿佐 みなみ, Asa Minami) and Minoru Yokitani (斧谷 稔, Yokitani Minoru), which are used to credit himself for screenplays and storyboards he creates, and Rin Iogi (井荻 麟, Iogi Rin), which he uses to credit himself for theme song lyrics he writes. Tomino has collaborated (as Iogi) with artists such as Yoko Kanno, Asei Kobayashi, MIO and Neil Sedaka.

Tomino is noted for directing several well-known anime series throughout his career, such as his most notable work, the Mobile Suit Gundam series, beginning in 1979, and which was later followed onto numerous sequels, spinoffs and merchandising franchises, Aura Battler Dunbine, Brave Raideen (in which he directed the first 26 episodes), and numerous others. His newer work includes Brain Powerd (1998), Turn A Gundam (1999), Overman King Gainer (2002) and most recently, Gundam Reconguista in G (2014).

=== 1970s ===
Tomino made his directorial debut with 1972's Triton of the Sea (海のトリトン, Umi no Toriton). This show, loosely based on Osamu Tezuka's manga Blue Triton, showed a different perspective than the traditional "good vs. evil" show. The star, Triton, a 10-year-old boy, is the last survivor of the Tritons, a tribe from Atlantis that was wiped out by the supposedly evil Poseidons. However the viewers learn later on that the story was not so black and white after all.

In 1975, Tomino worked on Brave Raideen, his first mecha work, in which he directed the first 26 episodes. Raideen was renowned and influential in its innovative portrayal of a giant machine of mysterious and mystical origins, and has gone on to inspire numerous other directors and series, including Yutaka Izubuchi's 2002 series, RahXephon. Tomino also later worked on 1977's Voltes V.

In 1977, Tomino directed Zambot 3. Certain sources cite this series as the origin of a nickname used by some anime fans, "Kill 'Em All Tomino" (皆殺しの富野, Minagoroshi no Tomino), due to the high number of character deaths (although Tomino had directed and worked in a number of series in which the vast majority of the protagonists survive).

In 1978, Tomino conceived, wrote and directed the successful Super Robot series Daitarn 3, which featured an unusual mix of spy adventure, drama, sci-fi and irony. The series introduced many "pastiche" elements which became popular in the Eighties. The lead character, Haran Banjo, is considered one of the most multi-layered and fascinating anime characters in history.

In 1979, Tomino directed and wrote Mobile Suit Gundam, which was highly influential in transforming the Super Robot mecha genre into the Real Robot genre. Mark Simmons discusses the impact of Gundam in his book, "Gundam Official Guide":

With its new, realistic approach to giant robots, Gundam changed the face of mecha anime and split the genre into two. Single-handedly inventing the "Real Robot" subgenre, Gundam forced all of its predecessors to be redefined as part of the "Super Robot" subgenre. Not surprisingly, Real Robots became all the rage after Gundam. Shows such as Combat Armor Dougram and Walker Machine Xabungle followed the trail Tomino had blazed.

In an interview published in Animerica magazine, Tomino discusses what he was trying to accomplish with Mobile Suit Gundam:

The bottom line is, I wanted to have a more realistic robot series - unlike a super robot – where everything is more reality-based, based on a humanoid robot. Right from the beginning, the roots of the mobile suit came from the worker robots that were building the space colonies back then, and they would become more technologically advanced, to the point of becoming a weapon, and that was the whole lineage of the robots I had in mind since the beginning. So the whole idea, my idea, of trying to have a robot series in space without it becoming a stupid story was based on wanting to make a story and surrounding it with reality – more realistic possibilities was the underlying concept.

Although the last quarter of the show's original script was canceled and it had to be completed in 43 episodes, its popularity grew after three compilation movies were released in 1981 and 1982. Mobile Suit Gundam was followed by numerous sequels, spin-offs and merchandising franchises, becoming one of the longest-running and most influential, popular anime series in history, being chosen as No. 1 on TV Asahi's "Top 100 Anime" listing in 2005.

=== 1980s ===
In 1980, Tomino directed Space Runaway Ideon, a series which like Mobile Suit Gundam was cancelled on its initial run, but featured movie versions later on. The series is known for its darker story elements. Tomino followed up with a more light-hearted series called Xabungle, but the darker nature of Ideon continued with 1983's Aura Battler Dunbine.

In 1984, Tomino released Heavy Metal L-Gaim. The following year, Tomino directed the first sequel to 1979's Mobile Suit Gundam, Mobile Suit Zeta Gundam. Tomino's involvement in the following Gundam series, 1986's Mobile Suit Gundam ZZ created an upbeat, comedic theme whereas the earlier Gundam's are of a darker theme. In 1988, Tomino concluded the saga begun in Mobile Suit Gundam with the Gundam motion picture Char's Counterattack.

=== 1990s and 2000s ===
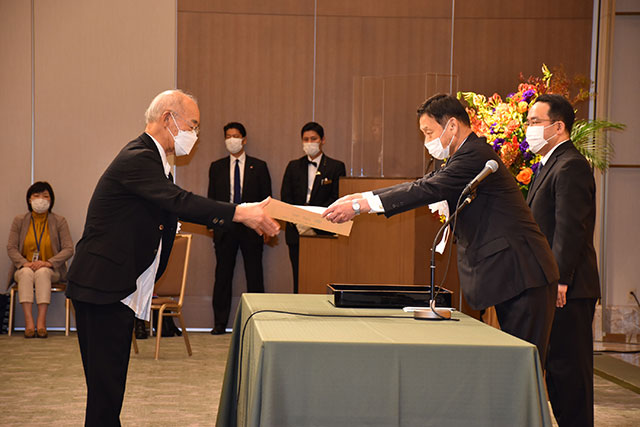
With Shinsuke Suematsu (Award Ceremony for the Persons of Cultural Merit, November 4, 2021)

Tomino directed an additional Gundam motion picture, Mobile Suit Gundam F91 in 1991. This movie, which took place 30 years after Char's Counterattack, re-launched the Gundam saga in a new direction by featuring a completely new cast.

In 1993, Tomino directed his next Gundam series, Victory Gundam, which (like F91 before) attempted to relaunch the Gundam saga with a completely new cast.

In 1996, Tomino wrote and directed Garzey's Wing, and in 1998 wrote and directed Brain Powerd. In 1999, he returned to Gundam with Turn A Gundam and in 2002, directed two compilations movies for it entitled Turn A Gundam I: Earth Light and Turn A Gundam II: Moonlight Butterfly. Also in 2002, he directed Overman King Gainer, and in 2005, Tomino directed 3 compilation movies summarizing the events of 1985's Zeta Gundam. His next major original work in the 2000s was the 6-episode OVA The Wings of Rean, which first premiered on the Internet across Bandai Channel, the broadcast beginning from December 12, 2005, with the final episode starting on August 18, 2006. Also in 2006, Tomino made a special cameo appearance in Shinji Higuchi's tokusatsu film Sinking of Japan.

At the 2009 CESA Developers Conference, Tomino used his keynote speech to criticize the gaming industry, citing that video games "bringing no productivity at all" and that "consoles are just consuming electricity", while stressing that game developers need to focus more on quality content rather than advanced technology, comparing it to the modern animation industry. His surprising remarks have sparked mass discussions online.

After working on the CGI short Ring of Gundam for Gundam's 30th anniversary in 2009, Tomino returned to the franchise again for its 35th anniversary in 2014 in a new work in which he wrote and directed, Gundam Reconguista in G.

The Anime Tourism Association, founded in 2016, has Tomino serving as its president.

Tomino was present at Gundam Factory Yokohama for the opening ceremony of the 18-meter "life-size" moving statue of Gundam in Yokohama.

== Filmography ==
=== Television ===
Year	Title	Creator	Director	Writer	Notes
1963–66	Astro Boy	No	Episode	Yes	Also storyboard artist
1965–66	Tatakae! Osper	No	Episode	No	Episode directorial debut
1968-69	Yuuyake Banchō	No	Episode	No	
1971	Wandering Sun	No	No	No	Storyboard artist
1972	Triton of the Sea	No	Yes	Yes	
1973–74	Neo-Human Casshern	No	Episode	No	Directed 9 episodes, also storyboard artist
1975	Reideen The Brave	No	Yes	No	Directed episodes 1–25
1975	La Seine no Hoshi	No	Yes	No	Directed episodes 27–39
1975–76	The Adventures of Pepero	No	Episode	No	Directed and storyboarded episodes 20, 23, and 25
1977–78	Voltes V	No	No	No	Producer
1977–78	Mechander Robo	No	Episode	No	Directed episode 9
1977–78	Invincible Super Man Zambot 3	Yes	Yes	Yes	
1978–79	Invincible Steel Man Daitarn 3	Yes	Yes	No	
1979–80	Mobile Suit Gundam	Yes	Yes	Yes	
1980–81	Space Runaway Ideon	Yes	Yes	No	
1982–83	Combat Mecha Xabungle	Yes	Yes	No	
1983–84	Aura Battler Dunbine	Yes	Yes	No	
1983–84	Ginga Hyōryū Vifam	No	No	No	Series is based on a draft written by Tomino
1984–85	Heavy Metal L-Gaim	Yes	Yes	No	
1985–86	Mobile Suit Zeta Gundam	Yes	Yes	Yes	
1986–87	Mobile Suit Gundam ZZ	Yes	Yes	Yes	
1993–94	Mobile Suit Victory Gundam	Yes	Yes	No	
1998	Brain Powerd	Yes	Yes	Yes	
1999–00	Turn A Gundam	Yes	Yes	No	
2002–03	Overman King Gainer	Yes	Yes	No	
2014–15	Gundam Reconguista in G	Yes	Yes	Yes	

=== Films ===
- Mobile Suit Gundam: The Movie (1981 – director, writer)
- Mobile Suit Gundam II: Soldiers of Sorrow (1982 – director, writer)
- Mobile Suit Gundam III: Encounters in Space (1982 – director, writer)
- The Ideon: A Contact (1982 – director)
- The Ideon: Be Invoked (1982 – director)
- Xabungle Graffiti (1983 – director)
- Mobile Suit Gundam: Char's Counterattack (1988 – director, writer)
- Mobile Suit Gundam F91 (1991 – director, writer)
- Turn A Gundam I: Earth Light (2002 – director, writer)
- Turn A Gundam II: Moonlight Butterfly (2002 – director, writer)
- Mobile Suit Zeta Gundam: A New Translation I – Heirs To The Stars (2005 – director, writer)
- Mobile Suit Zeta Gundam: A New Translation II – Lovers (2005 – director, writer)
- Mobile Suit Zeta Gundam: A New Translation III – Love is the Pulse of the Stars (2006 – director, writer)
- Sinking of Japan (2006 – actor)
- Ring of Gundam (2009 – director, writer)
- Gundam Reconguista in G Movie I Go! Core Fighter (2019 – director, writer)
- Gundam Reconguista in G Movie II Bellri's Fierce Charge (2020 – director, writer)
- Gundam Reconguista in G Movie III Legacy from Space (2021 – director, writer)
- Gundam Reconguista in G Movie IV Love That Cries Out in Battle (2022 – director, writer)
- Gundam Reconguista in G Movie V Beyond the Peril of Death (2022 – director, writer)

=== OVAs ===
- Heavy Metal L-Gaim (1986–87 – director)
- Garzey's Wing (1996–97 – director, writer)
- The Wings of Rean (2005–06 – director, writer)

== Bibliography ==
Novels

- Mobile Suit Gundam: Awakening, Escalation, Confrontation (1979–1981)
- The Wings of Rean (1983–1986)
- Mobile Suit Zeta Gundam (1985–1986)
- Mobile Suit Gundam: Char's Counterattack (1987–1988)
  - Mobile Suit Gundam: High-Streamer
  - Mobile Suit Gundam: Char's Counterattack: Bertochka Children (1988)
- Gaia Gear (1987–1991)
- Mobile Suit Gundam: Hathaway's Flash (1989–1990)
- Haran Banjō Series (1989–1992)
- Mobile Suit Gundam F91 Crossbone Vanguard (1991)
- Mobile Suit Victory Gundam (1993–1994)
- Look for Avenir (1995–1996)
- Secret Meeting: Amuro and Lala (1997)
- Brain Powerd (1998–1999, co-written)

Manga (written)

- Mobile Suit Victory Gundam (1993–1994)
- Mobile Suit Crossbone Gundam (1994–1997, concept)
- Brain Powerd (1998–2001)
- Overman King Gainer (2002–2009)

== Discography (as Rin Iogi) ==
- Mobile Suit Gundam
  - "Tobe! Gandamu (Fly! Gundam)" by Koh Ikeda (Series Opening Theme)
  - "Eien ni Amuro (Forever Amuro)" by Koh Ikeda (Series Ending Theme)
  - "Char ga Kuru (Char is Coming)" by Koichiro Hori
  - "Kirameki no Lalah (Shining Lalah)" by Keiko Toda
  - "Ima wa O-Yasumi" by Keiko Toda
  - "Kaze ni Hitori de (Alone in the Wind)" by Inoue Daisuke (Movie 2 Insert Song)
  - "Ai Senshi (Soldiers of Sorrow)" by Inoue Daisuke (Movie 2 Ending Theme)
  - "Beginning" by Inoue Daisuke (Movie 3 Insert Song)
  - "Meguriai (Encounters)" by Inoue Daisuke (Co-written with Maso Urino) (Movie 3 Ending Theme)
- The Ideon: A Contact: "Sailing Fly (Sailing Fly)" by Akiko Mizuhara
- The Ideon: Be Invoked: "Ummi ni Hi ni (Under the sun, on the sea)" by Akiko Mizuhara
- Aura Battler Dunbine: "Dunbine Tobu (Flying Dunbine, English version titled Dunbine Fire translated by J.C.Edward)" by MIO (Opening Theme)
- Heavy Metal L-Gaim: "Time for L-Gaim" by MIO (Opening Theme)
- Mobile Suit Zeta Gundam: "Zeta – Toki wo Koete (Zeta – Transcending Times)" by Maya Arukawa, composed by Neil Sedaka as Better Days Are Coming (First Opening Theme)
- Mobile Suit Gundam ZZ: "Issenman-Nen Ginga (The 10-million-year-old Galaxy)" by Jun Hiroe (Second Ending Theme)
- Mobile Suit Gundam F91: "Eternal Wind" by Hiroko Moriguchi (Ending Song)
- Mobile Suit Victory Gundam: "Stand up to the Victory" (First Opening Theme)
- Brain Powerd, composed by Yoko Kanno: "Ai no Field" by Kokia (First Ending Theme)
- Turn A Gundam, composed by Yoko Kanno
  - "Turn A Turn" by Hideki Saijou, composed by Asei Kobayashi (First Opening Theme)
  - "Century Color" by RAYS-GUNS (Co-written with You-mu Hamaguchi) (Second Opening Theme)
  - "Ojousan Naishobanashi desu (This is a private conversation, miss)" by Hideki Saijou
  - "Tsuki no Tama (Spirit of the Moon)" by RRET Team
  - "Tsuki no Mayu (The Cocoon of the Moon)" by Aki Okui (Second Ending Theme)
- Overman King Gainer: "King Gainer Over!" by Yoshiki Fukuyama (Opening Theme)
- Gundam Reconguista in G: "G no Senkō" by Daisuke Hasegawa (Ending Theme)

== Honours ==
- Person of Cultural Merit (2021)
- Order of the Rising Sun, 3rd Class, Gold Rays with Neck Ribbon (2026)
