= Aura Battler Dunbine =

Japanese anime television series

- 聖戦士ダンバイン
- Genre: Isekai, mecha, steampunk, science fantasy
- Creators: Hajime Yatate; Yoshiyuki Tomino
- Director: Yoshiyuki Tomino (chief)
- Character designer: Tomonori Kogawa
- Music: Katsuhiro Tsubonou
- Country of origin: Japan
- Original language: Japanese
- No. of episodes: 49

Production
- Producers: Toru Moriyama (Nagoya TV); Kuniaki Onishi (Sotsu Agency); Hiroto Nakagawa (Nippon Sunrise)
- Production companies: Nagoya TV; Sotsu Agency; Nippon Sunrise

Original release
- Networks: ANN (Nagoya TV, TV Asahi)
- Release: February 5, 1983 – January 21, 1984

Related
- Original video animation

Aura Battler Dunbine: The Tale of Neo Byston Well
- Directed by: Toshifumi Takizawa
- Written by: Yoshitake Suzuki
- Studio: Sunrise
- Released: February 25, 1988 – August 25, 1988
- Runtime: 25 minutes each
- Episodes: 3
- Related works
- Garzey's Wing (spin-off); The Wings of Rean (alternate story)

Aura Battler Dunbine (Japanese: 聖戦士ダンバイン, Hepburn: Seisenshi Danbain; lit. 'Holy Warrior Dunbine') is an anime television series created by Yoshiyuki Tomino and produced by Nippon Sunrise. Forty-nine episodes aired on Nagoya TV from February 5, 1983, to January 21, 1984. A three-episode anime OVA sequel entitled New Story of Aura Battler Dunbine (also known as The Tale of Neo Byston Well) was released in 1988. The series was later dubbed by ADV Films and was released on DVD in North America, along with the original Japanese version in 2003. It soon went out of print, and until 2018, was only available as a digital purchase from the now-defunct Daisuki site, then Sentai Filmworks licensed the series.

== Premise ==
The story is set in Byston Well, a parallel world that resembles the countryside of medieval Europe with kingdoms ruled by monarchs in castles, armies of unicorn-riding cavalry armed with swords and crossbows, and little winged creatures called Ferario, flying about offering help or hindrance depending on their mood.

The main draw to the series were the insect-like Aura Battlers, used by the population of Byston Well to fight their wars. These fighting suits are powered by a powerful energy called "aura" or "life energy." Certain people are strong enough with the aura-energy to act as power-supply to these mecha, making them Aura Warriors.

== Plot ==
The series followed Shō Zama, as he finds himself pulled into the world of Byston Well during a vehicular incident with one of his rivals. Byston Well is located in another dimension located between the sea and the land, and is populated with dragons, castles, knights, and powerful robots known as Aura Battlers. Once Shō is discovered to possess a formidable "aura", he is drafted into the Byston Well conflict as the pilot of the lavender-colored Dunbine.

As in other of Tomino's works, a young man is caught in the midst of an ongoing war that threatens to destabilize the world. There are romances that cut across battle lines, and the non-stop battles between elaborate fighting craft on land and in the air. Most of the cast pilot Aura Battlers, although there are many standard airships, smaller fighters, and large warships as well. Also, in typical Tomino style, a large number of named characters die tragically throughout the series.

== Characters ==
Shō Zama (ショウ・ザマ, Shō Zama)
Voiced by: Shigeru Nakahara (Japanese); Jay Hickman (English)
Shō is the young protagonist of the series. Before coming to Byston Well, he lived in Tokyo and enjoyed motocross racing. One night, as he was riding his motorcycle through the city, he was yanked to Byston Well in order to serve as a mecha pilot under the command of regional overlord Drake Luft. He soon discovers Luft's evil motives and switches sides, joining Nie Givun and his freedom fighters in their resistance to Luft's military advances. Over time (and through experience in battle,) Shō's Aura Power increases to near infinite levels, while control over his power correspondingly weakens. Also, during the series, he returns to Earth twice, but his already strained and dysfunctional relationship with his estranged parents (one of whom may be American) crumbles completely when they refuse to believe that he is not an impostor (he was believed dead during the 'accident' where he and his motorcycle disappeared—drawn to Byston Well). To further complicate matters, he comes to harbor intimate feelings for Marvel. However, the stresses of war prevent them from actively pursuing their relationship.
Marvel Frozen (マーベル・フローズン, Māberu Furōzun)
Voiced by: Mika Doi (Japanese); Christine Auten (English)
An attractive young woman whose wealthy parents own a large ranch near Dallas, Texas, Marvel was also brought to Byston Well to fight on the side of Drake Luft, but now works with Nie Givun to overthrow Luft. She and Shō Zama first meet as enemies, but, between her getting him to question his allegiance, and his guilt when House Luft attacks House Givun and kills Nie's mother, he soon allies with her. Her fighting abilities are on par with Shō, but she lags far behind him in Aura Power. When the battling armies of Byston Well are sent to Upper Earth by the Ferario, Marvel takes time to reconcile with her parents, and also to spend a few days visiting Hawaii with Shō. Though, early on, she seems to have some interest in Nie, Marvel falls deeply in love with Shō, and wishes that he would admit the feelings she knows he has for her.
Cham Huau (チャム・ファウ, Chamu Fau)
Voiced by: Maria Kawamura (Japanese); Kira Vincent-Davis (English)
A faerie companion of Shō's. Cham provides the emotional barometer to the group, and often finds herself more sensitive to the tensions in a situation. She is Shō's cheerleader, and vigorously defends him from enemies and naysayers alike.
Nie Givun (ニー・ギブン, Nī Gibun)
Voiced by: Makoto Ataka (Japanese); Vic Mignogna (English)
A somewhat embittered freedom fighter, Nie leads a small faction that opposes the military objectives of Drake Luft. Both of his parents are killed early in the war by Drake's forces, leaving him the sole survivor of the Givun family name. He commands the Aura ship, Zelana, and is harsh but dedicated to his crew. He also finds himself faced with a conflict during the war as he carries on a romance with Rimul Luft, Drake's daughter.
Keen Kiss (キーン・キッス, Kīn Kissu)
Voiced by: Yumi Takada (Japanese); Emily Carter (English)
The daughter of a noble house, Keen spends much of the earlier part of the series trying to prove herself. Her father, choosing to serve Drake to uphold the family name, is killed in combat against Nie's forces (Keen herself has to fight him.) Keen is a loyal, if not exactly skilled fighter, and is able to hold her own well enough until the final battle, even if she sometimes lets her want to prove herself get the better of her. While versed in the use of Aura Battlers, more often than not Keen serves as a support pilot, sortieing in the Fou fighter unit. She has feelings for Nie, but he does not seem to notice them.
Rimul Luft (リムル・ルフト, Rimuru Rufuto)
Voiced by: Kyōko Irokawa (Japanese); Hilary Haag (English)
Daughter of Drake Luft. While she does not seem to hate her father as a person, she shares no love for his actions and makes several efforts to aid Nie Givun's resistance forces. While her father does care about her, and, to that end, wishes to engage her to Burne, he fails to notice she is in love with Nie. She tries to escape her father to aid the resistance multiple times, but is repeatedly recaptured. Eventually, she escapes and joins Nie's group. Here, however, she's met with distrust by many, even after she proves herself in battle. A decent pilot, she does not get many chances to actively fight before she's taken back into custody. While she still seems to care for her father, she has no love for her mother, Luza. Unlike her father, she can see through her mother's schemes.
Todd Guinness (トッド・ギネス, Toddo Ginesu)
Voiced by: Hozumi Osaka (Japanese); John Gremillion (English)
Brought to Byston Well along with Shō, Todd means well enough but has the misfortune of making many poor decisions. Unlike Shō, who knows what he wants to fight for, Todd finds his motives changing throughout his time in the war. Initially believing Byston Well to be only a dream, he takes a very lax attitude to his new role, enticed by the prospect he could very well become a king in Byston Well. It is only after several defeats, and being faced with the prospect of being replaced by Drake, that he starts to become serious, now fighting for his pride. During one of these battles, he is taken down by Shō and left bed-ridden for some time. When he returns and finds he's been cast aside by Drake, he eagerly accepts an offer from one of Drake's compatriots, Bishot, as he sees an opportunity to get revenge on Shō for his disgrace. It is only when the armies are sent to Upper Earth that he finally finds a cause worth fighting for, believing if he can defeat Shō, Drake will not attack America, and thus he can protect his mother.
Burne Bannings (バーン・バニングス, Bān Baningusu)
Voiced by: Shō Hayami (Japanese); John Swasey (English)
Shō Zama's former commander. Throughout most of the series, he serves Shō's main rival. Commands extreme respect from his underlings, and grudging respect from his superiors. Burne oversees Drake's armies for a better part of the war. During the latter half of the series, however, he is defeated by Shō and left for dead. He then returns to Drake's army under the moniker of Black Knight. He is, for a time, engaged to Rimul, even though she does not hold mutual feelings for him.
Ciela Lapana (シーラ・ラパーナ, Shīra Rapāna)
Voiced by: Miki Takahashi (Japanese); Luci Christian (English)
The queen of the land of Na. She is rescued by Shō and encourages him to fight for not only the crew of the Zelana, but for all people of Byston Well. Later she rallies her army (including the powerful battleship Gran-Garan) and joins Shō's group in the fight against Luft. When the Dunbine is defeated in battle, it is her forces that provide Shō with the powerful new Billbine battler.
Drake Luft (ドレイク・ルフト, Doreiku Rufuto)
Voiced by: Shōji Oki (Japanese); Phil Ross (English)
The main antagonist of the series, Drake is the lord who initially orders Shō (and others) drawn into Byston Well. An ambitious man, Drake believes he is doing the right thing by forcefully uniting the people of Byston Well under his banner. His personal life is not much better, as, while he holds love for his daughter, Rimul, he fails to realize that she's been working against him. Similarly, he also remains oblivious to his wife's plotting behind his back with Bishot to have him eliminated. During the final battle, he commands the battleship Will-Wips.
Shott Weapon (ショット・ウェポン, Shotto Wepon)
Voiced by: Masahiko Tanaka (Japanese); Andy McAvin (English)
A brilliant, but shady man. Shott is responsible for inventing the Aura Battlers. Originally believed to be from Silicon Valley, the later episodes of the anime suggest there's more to his past than he's willing to let on. Nevertheless, along with being a skilled inventor, he proves a fierce opponent as he brings his own contributions into the final battle, including the battleship Spriggan.
Bishot Hate (ビショット・ハッタ, Bishotto Hatta)
Voiced by: Kazuyuki Sogabe (Japanese); Chris Patton (English)
One of Drake's comrades and, as far as Drake believes, an ally, Bishot is actually quite the opposite. Throughout much of the series, he and Luza are actually plotting behind Drake's back, presumably planning to seize power from him. He also provides a great deal of the force involved in the final battle, and he's the one who enlists Todd after he's dismissed by Drake. During the final battle, he commands the warship Gyre-Garing.
Elle Humm (エレ・ハンム, Ere Hanmu)
Voiced by: Run Sasaki (Japanese); Allison Sumrall (English)
Granddaughter of King Phaezon and the third major contributor to the resistance during the final battles. Commanding the armies of her grandfather and the immensely powerful warship Graon, Elle fights for those in her family who have lost their lives to the war. As the series progresses, she also begins to develop tremendous aura powers, even having the ability to influence pilots from a distance.
Jeryll Coochibie (ジェリル・クチビ, Jeriru Kuchibi)
Voiced by: Tomoko Otsuka (Japanese); Melissa Cybele (English)
After the failure of the trio from Upper Earth that included Shō and Todd, Drake has a second set brought over for his armies. Jeryll is easily the deadliest of these three. Violent, impulsive, and seemingly enjoying the carnage, her immense powers serve as a frightening mirror to what Shō could have become had he continued serving with Drake. She is also the first pilot to bring about 'hyper' mode (when a pilot experiences a great surge of aura power causing their battler to grow several times larger and become devastating as a result.)
Garalia Nyamhee (ガラリア・ニャムヒー, Gararia Nyamuhī)
Voiced by: Shinobu Adachi
Burne's follower, wants to fly an Aura Battler.

== Songs ==
Opening theme
"Dunbine Tobu" (ダンバイン とぶ, Danbain Tobu; "Dunbine Flies") performed by MIQ
Ending theme
"Mieru Darō Byston Well" (みえるだろうバイストン・ウェル, Mieru Darō Baisuton Weru; "Do you see Byston Well") performed by MIO
Insert songs
"Ao no Speech Balloon" (青のスピーチ・バルーン, Ao no Supīchi Barūn; "Blue Speech Balloon") performed by Hiromi Koide
"Mizuiro no Kagayaki" (水色の輝き; "Light Blue Glow") performed by Hiromi Koide

== Appearances in other media ==
=== Novels ===
No.	Title	Author	Publisher	Date	ISBN
1	Aura Battler War Chronicles 1 Love in the Country of A (オーラバトラー戦記 ①アの国の恋)	Yoshiyuki Tomino	Kadokawa Shoten	November 17, 1986	9784047762077
2	Aura Battler War Chronicles 2 Warrior Miina (オーラバトラー戦記 2戦士・美井奈(みいな))	Yoshiyuki Tomino	Kadokawa Shoten	May 15, 1987	9784047762084
3	Aura Battler War Chronicles 3 Garrow Run Sign (オーラバトラー戦記 3ガロウ・ラン・サイン)	Yoshiyuki Tomino	Kadokawa Shoten	June 17, 1988	9784047762091
4	Aura Battler War Chronicles 4 Guy theater (オーラバトラー戦記 4ギィ撃攘(げきじょう))	Yoshiyuki Tomino	Kadokawa Shoten	November 17, 1988	9784047762107
5	Aura Battler War Chronicles 5 Detachment (オーラバトラー戦記 5離反)	Yoshiyuki Tomino	Kadokawa Shoten	June 15, 1989	9784047762114
6	Aura Battler War Chronicles 6 Soft landing (オーラバトラー戦記 6軟着陸)	Yoshiyuki Tomino	Kadokawa Shoten	November 21, 1989	9784047762121
7	Aura Battler War Chronicles 7 Over Tokyo (オーラバトラー戦記 ⑦東京上空)	Yoshiyuki Tomino	Kadokawa Shoten	November 16, 1990	9784047762138
8	Aura Battler War Chronicles 8 Machine Proliferation (オーラバトラー戦記 ⑧マシン増殖)	Yoshiyuki Tomino	Kadokawa Shoten	June 24, 1991	9784047762145
9	Aura Battler War Chronicles 9 Aura destruction (オーラバトラー戦記 ⑨オーラ壊乱)	Yoshiyuki Tomino	Kadokawa Shoten	October 24, 1991	9784047762152
10	Aura Battler War Chronicles 10 time layers (オーラバトラー戦記 ⑩重層の刻(とき))	Yoshiyuki Tomino	Kadokawa Shoten	May 25, 1992	9784047762169
11	Aura Battler War Chronicles 11 Final volume Hyper Horizon (オーラバトラー戦記 ⑪完結編 ハイパー・ホリゾン)	Yoshiyuki Tomino	Kadokawa Shoten	September 25, 1992	9784047762176
1	Fau Fau Monogatari Jou (ファウ・ファウ物語 上)	Yoshiyuki Tomino	Kadokawa Shoten	August 13 , 1986	9784044101107
2	Fau Fau Monogatari Ge (ファウ・ファウ物語 下)	Yoshiyuki Tomino	Kadokawa Shoten	November 06 , 1987	9784044101114

=== Super Robot Wars ===
The Dunbine characters, mecha, and storyline elements make appearances in quite a few games in the Super Robot Wars series by Banpresto; most notably the "first" series. Banpresto has gone on to make spinoff series taking place in different universes such as the Alpha series and Impact. However, Dunbine has made few appearances in these latter titles, but has recently been making something of a comeback, first returning in UX, followed almost immediately after by Operation Extend and BX. Y gives the most recent use of the story.

=== Another Century's Episode ===
The Dunbine units have also appeared in the Another Century's Episode series. In the first sequel, Another Century's Episode 2, many more units from the Dunbine series are included compared to the amount in the first game, and they have a very large part in the plot. Shō and Marvel, piloting the Bilbine and Dunbine respectively, also acquire a unique team attack. In Another Century's Episode 3, through the story plot did not involve Dunbine's. But all the player unit continues appear, and Bilbine shares a combination attack with Nanajin from The Wings of Rean, which also having its world set up in Byston Well.

=== Video games ===
The first three games were produced by Family Soft for the MSX. The 2000 title was released for the PlayStation by Bandai.

- Seisenshi Dunbine (1991)
- Seisenshi Dunbine: Shou (1992)
- Seisenshi Dunbine: Shita (1992)
- Aura Battler Dunbine (2000)

== New Story of Aura Battler Dunbine ==
Cover art of the New Story of Aura Battler Dunbine OVA

New Story of Aura Battler Dunbine (also known as The Tale of Neo Byston Well), is a three episode anime OVA released in 1988. It is a sequel to the TV Series Dunbine set roughly 700 years after the events of the show. It is also the second show set in the fictional medieval land of Byston Well, and is followed by Garzey's Wing and The Wings of Rean.

It was directed by Toshifumi Takizawa (Samurai 7).

=== Plot ===
700 years have passed since the great war involving Aura Machines ended. In his attempt to conquer Byston Well, the Black Knight Rabaan kidnaps the princess of the nation Baran-Baran – a nation said to hold a legendary treasure. Rabaan also captures Shion, a young hunter.

Shion and the princess, Remul, escape from Rabaan's castle and return to their homeland. There, they find out that the Baran-Baran treasure is actually a powerful Aura Battler, Sirbine.

Riding the Sirbine, Shion fights against Rabaan's evil forces.

=== Characters ===
Shion Zaba (シオン・ザバ, Shion Zaba)
Voiced by Shigeru Nakahara
The protagonist of the story, Shion is a young man from Baran-Baran. After being captured by Rabaan, he and Remul escape with the help of a fairy, Silky Mau. He pilots the Sirbine, a powerful Aura Battler, against Rabaan's forces. He is actually the reincarnation of Shō Zama from the original TV series.
Remul Jilfird (レムル・ジルフィード, Remuru Jirufīdo)
Voiced by Yoshino Takamori
Princess of Baran-Baran, Remul's family were tasked with the job of guarding the Sirbine. She is the reincarnation of Rimul Luft.
Silky Mau (シルキー・マウ, Shirukī Mau)
Voiced by Keiko Yokozawa
Silky is a Ferario (faerie) which was captured by Shion at the beginning of the series, but decides to help him after he releases her. Silky was the Ferario captured and used by Drake Luft in the original Dunbine to draw aura warriors from Upper Earth.
Rabaan Zaramand (ラバーン・ザラマンド, Rabān Zaramando)
Voiced by Shō Hayami
The self-proclaimed "Black Knight", Rabaan rides the Aura Battler "Zwauth". He leads an army to conquest Byston Well. He is the reincarnation of Burne Bannings.
Beraana Gariaha (ベラーナ・ガリアッハ, Berāna Gariahha)
Voiced by Shinobu Adachi
A female warrior, she is a subordinate of Rabaan's. She's the reincarnation of Garalia Nyamhee.
The Northern Sage/Shott Weapon (ショット・ウェポン, Shotto Wepon)
Voiced by Masahiko Tanaka
A mysterious being who seems to have an ulterior motive. The only "survivor" in Byston Well from the original Dunbine series, seeking a means to die after spending 700 years as an immortal who aged normally.

=== Music ===
"Last No"
Performed by Midori Karashima. Used as ending theme for the 1st episode.
"Colored Monologue" (モノローグを染めて, Monorōgu o Somete)
Performed by Midori Karashima. Used as ending theme for second and third episodes.

=== Staff ===
- Original Creation - Yoshiyuki Tomino
- Director - Toshifumi Takizawa
- Writer - Yoshitake Suzuki
- Character Designer - Tomonori Kogawa
- Mecha Designer - Yutaka Izubuchi
- Animation Director - Moriyasu Tanikuchi
- Art Director - Eiji Hirakawa
- Sound Director - Sadayoshi Fujino
- Composer - Reijiro Koroku

== See also ==
- Gamera Rebirth
