= Masami Kikuchi =

Japanese voice actor and narrator (born 1960)

- 菊池 正美
- Born: April 24, 1960 (age 66); Tsukahara, Chino, Nagano, Japan
- Other name: Kikkun (きっくん)
- Occupation: Voice actor
- Years active: 1983–present
- Agent: Kenyu Office
- Notable credits: Tenchi Muyo! as Tenchi Masaki; Digimon Adventure as Joe Kido; Oh My Goddess! as Keiichi Morisato; Chibi Maruko-chan as Kazuhiko Hanawa; Zatch Bell! as Kanchomé; Hunter × Hunter as Wing; Grappler Baki as Baki Hanma; Sonic the Hedgehog as Sonic the Hedgehog
- Website: Official profile

Masami Kikuchi (菊池 正美, Kikuchi Masami; born April 24, 1960) is a Japanese voice actor and narrator from Nagano.

He was affiliated with Troubadour Music Office until March 2010. He then worked as a freelancer until he was employed in April 2011 by Kenyu Office.

He is most known for his anime voice roles such as the titular character in Tenchi Muyo!, Joe Kido in Digimon Adventure, Keiichi Morisato in Oh My Goddess!, Kazuhiko Hanawa in Chibi Maruko-chan, Kanchomé in Zatch Bell!, Wing in Hunter × Hunter, the titular character in Grappler Baki, and the titular character in the 1996 Sonic the Hedgehog OVA.

== Biography ==
After graduating from Nagano Prefectural Okaya Minami High School, he moved from Nagano to Tokyo and enrolled in the drama department at Japan Electronics College (now known as Nihon Kogakuin College).

After graduating from the college, he supported himself through part-time jobs while training at the Gekidan Haisho Talent Training School. He then went on to found and work with the theater company Gekidan Art Box.

=== Becoming a voice actor ===
Originally Kikuchi wanted to become an actor, but struggled to make a living as a freelancer. As he wondered what to do, he ran into a friend with a flyer for Troubadour Music Office. Kikuchi noticed Tarako's name as a singer and voice actress and thought, "Oh, it's not a sketchy agency after all" before laughing.

=== Career ===
He auditioned through an anime director’s introduction in Troubadour's training program and officially made his debut as a voice actor as the voice of Soldier A in Aura Battler Dunbine in 1983.

Since consecutively playing major roles with Mike Coil in Ninja Senshi Tobikage, Iino Abbav in Mobile Suit Gundam ZZ, Jordi in Panzer World Galient: The Crest of Iron, and Kaine Wakaba in Metal Armor Dragonar, he began to portray a wide range of characters from leads to supporting roles across many genres, with Kikuchi himself noting, "Originally, I aspired to work in movies and TV dramas, but as I continued doing anime, I came to realize the true appeal of voice acting."

He was affiliated with Troubadour Music Office until March 2010. After working as a freelancer, he has been affiliated with Kenyu Office as of April 2011.

== Filmography ==
=== Television animation ===
Year	Title	Role	Refs
1983	Aura Battler Dunbine	Soldier A	
1983–1985	Urusei Yatsura	Truck Driver	
1986	Mobile Suit Gundam ZZ	Ino Abbav	
1986	Animated Classics of Japanese Literature	Bunji, Kenji	
1987–1988	Metal Armor Dragonar	Kaine Wakaba	
1987–1988	Kimagure Orange Road	Yusaku Hino	
1990	Brave Exkaiser	Blue Raker, Ultra Raker	
1990	Chibi Maruko-chan	Kazuhiko Hanawa, Mimatsuya, Misawa, Negishi, Watanabe	
1990	Ranma ½	Copycat Ken	
1991	Jankenman	Janken Car	
1991–1992	Goldfish Warning!	Michael	
1992	Floral Magician Mary Bell	George	
1992	The Cobi Troupe	Jordi	
1993	Aoki Densetsu Shoot	Kazuhiro Hiramatsu	
1993	The Brave Express Might Gaine	Mitsuhiko Hamada, Bird Bomber, Jet Diver	
1995	Captain Tsubasa J	Shingo Aoi	
1995	Tenchi Muyo!	Tenchi Masaki	
1996	Rurouni Kenshin	Ryūzaburō Higashiyama	
1999	Hunter × Hunter	Wing	
1999–2000	Digimon Adventure	Joe Kido, Additional voices	
2000	Digimon Adventure 02	Joe Kido, Jim Kido, Daemon	
2001	Grappler Baki	Baki Hanma	
2001	PaRappa the Rapper	PJ Berri	
2001	Comic Party	Kazuki Sendō	
2001	Captain Tsubasa ~ Road to 2002	Gino Hernandez, Alan Pascal	
2001	Digimon Tamers	Dolphin	
2001	Groove Adventure RAVE	Sieg Hart	
2001–2005	The Prince of Tennis	Hiroshi Wakato	
2002	Digimon Frontier	Neemon	
2002	Daigunder	Howard	
2003	Cromartie High School	Ken Hirai	
2003	Zatch Bell!	Kanchomé	
2003	Maburaho	Taki	
2003–2004	Di Gi Charat Nyo!	Daifuku Ankoro	
2005	Oh My Goddess!	Keiichi Morisato	
2005	Comic Party Revolution	Kazuki Sendō	
2006	Air Gear	Onigiri	
2006	Digimon Savers	Akihiro Kurata, Belphemon	
2008	One Piece	Kelly Funk, Kabu, Pound, Donquixote Mjosgard, Charlotte Anglais, Mouse-Man, Doran	
2011	Digimon Xros Wars	Tuwarmon/Damemon	
2011	Hunter × Hunter	Zepile	
2013	Crayon Shin-chan	Takuzo Kaida, Teruo Mikashi, Mantaro Tawa	
2016	Dragon Ball Super	Monaka, Vermoud	
2017	Kado: The Right Answer	Naoki Sasauchi	
2018	One Piece: Episode of Skypiea	Aruyutayan V	
2020	Digimon Adventure	Neamon	
2021	Mewkledreamy Mix!	Suama's Grandfather	
2022	Digimon Ghost Game	Ryudamon	
2023	Butt Detective	Hatomura	
2024	Run for Money: The Great Mission	Phantom Claw	
2025	Digimon Beatbreak	GoldNumemon	

=== Original video animation (OVA) ===
Year	Title	Role	Refs
1989	Legend of the Galactic Heroes	Konrad von Modell	
1991	Otaku no Video	Miyoshi	
1992	Tenchi Muyo! Ryo-Ohki	Tenchi Masaki	
1993–1994	Oh My Goddess!	Keiichi Morisato	
1995	Kodomo no Omocha	Rei Sagami	
1996	Sonic the Hedgehog	Sonic the Hedgehog, Metal Sonic	

=== Films ===
Year	Title	Role	Refs
1986	Super Mario Bros.: The Great Mission to Rescue Princess Peach!	Prince Haru	
1989	The Venus Wars	Lob	
1994	Pretty Soldier Sailor Moon S	Kakeru Ōzora	
1996	Tenchi Muyo in Love!	Tenchi Masaki	
1996	Doraemon: Nobita and the Galaxy Super-express	Prince	
1999	Digimon Adventure	Joe Kido	
2000	Ah! My Goddess: The Movie	Keiichi Morisato	
2000	Digimon Adventure: Our War Game!	Joe Kido, Kinu	
2004	Konjiki no Gash Bell!! Movie 1: Unlisted Demon 101	Kanchomé	
2019	The Legend of the Galactic Heroes: Die Neue These Seiran	Boris Konev	

=== Tokusatsu ===
Year	Title	Role	Notes	Refs
2016	Doubutsu Sentai Zyuohger	Dorobozu	Episode 14	

=== Video games ===
Year	Title	Role	Notes
2000	Super Robot Wars Alpha		
2001	Super Robot Wars Alpha Gaiden		
2004	Tales of Rebirth	Saleh	
2004	Zatch Bell! 101st Devil	Kanchome	
2005	Konjiki no Gash Bell 2: Attack of the Mecha Vulcans	Kanchome	
2005	Super Robot Wars Alpha 3: To the End of the Galaxy		
2005	Another Century's Episode	Kaine Wakaba, Dunkel Cooper	
2006	Another Century's Episode 2		
2017	Super Robot Wars V		
2018	Super Robot Wars X		
2019	Super Robot Wars T		

=== Drama CDs ===
Year	Title	Role	Notes
1995	C Kara Hajimaru Koi mo Ii	Takenoshin	
1995	Abunai Campus Love	Harumi Okikura	Series 4
1995	My Sexual Harassment	Shun Kazami	Series 3
1995	Onegai Darlin'	Kouchirou Imada	
1996	Catch Me!	Shikyou Katayama	
1996	Eien no Midori ~Nochinoomohini~	Junya Shibasaki	
1997	Ourin Gakuen: Ikenai Seitokaishitsu	Shuuichirou Kazama	Series 1
2000	Koisuru Jewelry Designer 2	Yuutarou Mori	
2006	Koisuru Jewelry Designer	Yuutarou Mori	

=== Dubbing ===
Original Year	Title	Role	Original actor	Notes	Refs
1991	Doug	Skeeter Valentine	Fred Newman	1998 Japanese dub	
1993	VeggieTales	Bob the Tomato	Phil Vischer	U.S. direct-to-video 1993, 1998 Japanese dub	
1994	Serial Mom	Eugene Sutphin	Sam Waterston	2025 BS10 Star Channel edition	
