= Metal Armor Dragonar =

Japanese anime series

- 機甲戦記ドラグナー
- Genre: Mecha, Military Science Fiction
- Created by: Hajime Yatate
- Directed by: Takeyuki Kanda
- Music by: Toshiyuki Watanabe; Kentarō Haneda
- Country of origin: Japan
- Original language: Japanese
- No. of episodes: 48

Production
- Producers: Juichi Kamiya (Nagoya TV); Shin Imai (Nagoya TV); Mitsushige Inagaki (Sotsu Agency); Takayuki Yoshii (Sunrise)
- Production companies: Nagoya TV; Sotsu Agency; Sunrise

Original release
- Network: ANN (Nagoya TV, TV Asahi)
- Release: 7 February 1987 – 30 January 1988

Metal Armor Dragonar (機甲戦記ドラグナー, Kikō Senki Doragunā) is a 48-episode mecha anime series, created by Nippon Sunrise (later renamed Sunrise during production) and aired from 1987 to 1988. Devised shortly after the release of Mobile Suit Gundam ZZ, Dragonar was intended to be both a "starter" series to get new fans into mecha anime, and a potential successor to the Gundam franchise. In fact, its concept is to be the renewal of the first Gundam; and the mecha are designed by Kunio Okawara, the mechanical designer for most of the Gundam series.

Though the series enjoyed good ratings and earned a loyal fan following, it failed to surpass Gundam and ended up as a single series, probably due to its light, ZZ Gundam–like take on the real robot mecha genre. Game developer Banpresto had Dragonar appear in two of its popular franchises, Super Robot Wars and Another Century's Episode; fans responded positively, and Sunrise acknowledged them in 2005 by releasing a memorial DVD collection of the series, a remastered version of the previous two-part laserdisc box set releases years before.

== Story ==
Dragonar takes place in the year 2087 AD, when a military force called the United Lunar Empire Giganos has risen and captured the Moon. Their stated goal is the rebirth of mankind, but their primary intention by some of its members is the destruction of all those who dwell on Earth. To this end, the Empire uses humanoid battle machines called Metal Armors, as well as a gigantic mass driver cannon. Originally intended to send lunar material to Earth orbit for later retrieval, the Mass driver is reconfigured to launch small meteorites towards the home world. By the time the story takes place, many bombardments have already taken place.

The Earth Alliance became the Earth Federation military, unable to compete with the Giganos military might, manages to steal three prototype Metal Armors, called the Dragonars, with plans to reverse-engineer them with the help of exiled Giganos scientists. However, the ship carrying the Dragonars (posing as a refugee ship) is chased to a neutral colony by Giganos, and an attack is staged to retrieve them. Kaine, Tapp and Light, three teenaged friends and EFM trainees, are on the colony during the attack, and find a dying Giganos spy who gives them three disks. Chased by Giganos' weapons, the trio enters the colony's dock and finds the Dragonars.

Using the disks, they activate the machines and use them to protect the colony. However, since the Dragonars are keyed to only be operable by their initial user, the three friends find themselves forced to become the Earth Alliance military's first Metal Armor pilots, and it becomes the earth federation during the war faced against the advanced technology and veterans of the Giganos forces.

== Characters ==
Kaine Wakaba & Linda Plato

=== Earth Federation Military (formerly Earth Alliance) ===
Kaine Wakaba (ケーン・ワカバ, Kēn Wakaba) - The pilot of Dragonar-1 and the main protagonist of the story. A sixteen-year-old Earth Alliance trainee Now Earth Federation Military trainee who graduated in Japan, Kaine lives on Alucard with his mother, who helps manage the colony. His parents split up, and Kaine resents his father for putting his work before his family. When his mother is apparently killed in the attack on Alucard, he is more than willing to help fight Giganos. Voiced by Masami Kikuchi.

Tapp Oceano (タップ・オセアノ, Tappu Oseano) - One of Kaine's two best friends and the pilot of Dragonar-2. Tapp is a 16 year old African-American New Yorker and graduated from an American training academy and was transferred to the astronaut academy on Alucard. Tapp tends to be cheerful and laid back, even in situations where Kaine and Light are stressing out. Even so, he can be serious when the need arises. His family lives in Alliance/Federation occupied New York. Voiced by Hōchū Ōtsuka.

Light Newman (ライト・ニューマン, Raito Nyūman) - Another of Kaine's best friends and the pilot of Dragonar-3. A 17 year old native of the UK, Light's grandfather was in the Parliament and his father leads the Federation's European branch when the alliance became the federation during the war. However, he prefers to avoid positions of leadership, showing a natural aptitude for information-gathering and electronic warfare, which makes him the perfect pilot for Dragonar-3 (which he affectionately calls "D3-chan"). Voiced by Kenyuu Horiuchi.

Linda Plato (リンダ・プラート, Rinda Purāto) - Main heroine character Meio's younger sister, she becomes an enlisted member of the Alliance after the attack on the Alucard colony. Combined with her role as a communications officer/operator for the Earth Federation Military, she is very much an homage to Sayla Mass from Mobile Suit Gundam. Voiced by Kayoko Fujii.

Rose Pattenton (ローズ・パテントン, Rōzu Patenton) - Rose was born on the Moon and became a refugee when Giganos declared independence. She escapes to Alucard and later boards the Idaho before the colony is destroyed. At 16 she is a warm and charming personality who assists in supervising the refugee children. Her character is possibly a nod at Mobile Suit Gundam's Frau Bow. Voiced by Akiko Hiramatsu.

Ben Rooney (ベン・ルーニー, Ben Rūnī) - Kaine, Tapp and Light's direct superior, a gruff but caring soldier who takes the three trainees under his wing and instructs them in piloting. Often nicknamed 'Umiboozu' (sea monster) by Kaine because of his large size. Has a close relationship with Lt. Diane Lance, whom he marries at the end of the series. Voiced by Yuu Shimaka.

Diane Lance (ダイアン・ランス, Daian Ransu) - Diane was thought to be a refugee but turns out to be a Lt for the Earth Federation Military . She works in the information branch and is active in the 1st and 2nd arc but is later reassigned and only returns in the ending, which shows her marrying Ben Rooney.

Kenny Duncan

Yama

Douglas

Lang Plato

Genil

Soul Jirsett

Jim Austin - Kaine's father who left his family behind for the Earth Alliance/Federation military but he remained on extremely good terms with his wife and her family. He is an excellent pilot.

Aoi Wakaba - Kaine's mother, who administered the space colony Alucard and was initially presumed dead after a Giganos attack, but later found to be alive but captured by Giganos and used as a threat against Kaine Wakaba as part of their plan to bring down the Federation.

=== United Lunar Empire Giganos ===
Meio Plato - Giganos' top ace pilot, nicknamed the Blue Hawk (蒼き鷹, Aoki Taka). He gained fame piloting the Falguen and is fiercely loyal to Guiltorre. His father Lang Plato is the engineer who helped develop the Dragonars, and he has a younger sister, Linda, who opposes the war. Despite his calm nature and popularity with younger pilots, he is repeatedly looked down on by his superiors for failing to capture the Dragonars and begins to chaffe under Dorchenov's command, eventually being framed for the murder of Guiltorre by Dorchenov. In the end, he and Kaine set aside their differences and defeat Dorchenov by exploiting Dorchenov's machine's weakness and attacking with a volley of missiles and finished by a combination attack using their beam swords (which was recognised and implemented into Super Robot Wars). He is very much an homage to Char Aznable from Gundam. Voiced by Jūrōta Kosugi.

Dan Kruger Practice Squad member. Fiercely loyal to Meio Plato. Out of the Plato Squad Members, he is the only one to die, which happens while he protects Meio and the rest of the squadron from enemy fire as the rest escape to cover while their sensors were damaged earlier.

Welner Fritz Practice Squad member. Fiercely loyal to Meio Plato.

Karl Geiner Practice Squad member. Fiercely loyal to Meio Plato.

Marshal Guiltorre Marshal of the Giganos Empire. He was originally an officer of a certain country, but became concerned about the corruption of Earth, and led a rebellion by uniting the garrison forces of various countries stationed at bases on the moon, becoming the de facto leader of the "United Empire of Giganos."Although he is a dictator who rebelled against the Earth government, he has a strong love for his home planet, Earth, and is an upstanding person who values justice in matters.He was a close friend of Lang Praet, but they parted ways due to differences in ideology. He had complete confidence in his son, Maillot.They used mass drivers to attack key points of the Earth Alliance forces, but they prioritized the ideals of the war and refused to agree to an all-out attack until the very end. Although he was a noble man, he lacked the ruthlessness required of a politician, and was unable to stop the corruption at the core of the military, including that of Dorchenov.Not only did he allow dissatisfied young officers to rebel, but he also lacked the ruthlessness to punish them, which led to Dolchenov becoming more arrogant, and he was eventually shot by Lieutenant Colonel Dolchenov. He dies, mourning the fate of Earth, which will be damaged by the inevitable intensification of war. His last words are, "Do not attack the Mass Driver." Falsely accused of assassination, Meio uses these words as his final motivation to destroy the Mass Driver. In the novel version, his full name is given as "Messiah Guiltorre."

Chephov Giganos Lt. stationed on an abandoned satellite, who captured the three Dragonar but then began to train and befriend them. Shot by Meio Plato for refusing Guiltorre's orders that the Dragonar pilots be taken into his custody. Given a funeral ceremony by Kaine, Tapp, and Light.

Gon Jem Leader of the "Gon Jem Shittenoh" platoon and pilot of the YAMA-13 Geyzam, and later the YGMA-14 Gilgazamune. Ridiculed with the nickname of "Garbage of Giganos". Despite his infamy, he respects and values his subordinates Gold, Ganan, Zin and Min to the point of swearing revenge against the Dragonar Team for the death of the first three.

Lee Sue Min Gon Jem Shittenoh member, and pilot of the Stark Deins. Eventually joins Meio Plato's platoon when fighting against Dorchenov. Her machine is best known for the chainsaws attached to the arms, which makes her a deadly opponent when close-up.

Gol Gon Jem Shittenoh member, and pilot of the Stark Gewei. He is usually seen carrying a chaingun and is prone to fire it at random during fits of rage. Because of his savage nature, low level of intellect and size, he is nicknamed "Gorilla", something that he hates being called.

Ganan Gon Jem Shittenoh member, and pilot of the Stark Gan-Dolla. He is known for carrying a knife (or more) wherever he goes. His last words are a cry for help after Kaine slashes his unit in half with his laser sword, which destroys the robot unit and sends the motorcycle unit, with Ganan on board, crashing into a cliff, killing him instantly.

Zin Gon Jem Shittenoh member, and pilot of the Stark Dauzhen. The womanizer and somewhat more civilized one of the group. His weapon of choice is a pair of Sai. Zin's machine's unique attribute is the ability to generate holograms of itself to confuse the opponent, though it can be negated by D-3's jammers.

Mordel

Perkins

Dorchenov - Dorchenov is an ambitious officer of Giganos who, while not seen much early on, becomes the main villain of the series when he wages a coup d'état of the Empire and assassinates Guiltorre, and putting the blame on Giganos ace Meio Plato who also happens to be at the scene. Though mostly a political figure in Giganos, he is just as capable as a pilot in a Metal Armor.

=== Civilians ===
Martin

Jack

Danny

Betty

G UNIT

=== Metal Armor/Falk Armor ===
Dragonar Series

The Dragonar Series or so called "D-Weapons" These are Metal Armors were brought to the Earth Alliance by Dr. Lang Plato Developed mobile weapons an authority on metal armor in the Giganos Empire. While the frame which eliminated the primary armor was standardized different secondary armors and vetronics allowed for different specifications such as combat attack and electronic warfare .Additional parts were also available, making them suitable for both space and ground use. A mass-produced Dragoon based on the D-weapon was later developed, but this machine surpassed the prototype in materials and overall capabilities marking the end of the D-weapon's role. However as a general-purpose machine, the Dragoon did not fully utilize the new technology. Therefore, a plan was conceived to utilize a modified machine that maximized the technology as a symbol of the Earth Alliance and the D-1 and D-2 were upgrades.Pilots are required to register and registration is done by inserting a registration disk into the main computer and scanning data such as the pilot's voiceprint and physique. Deregistration can generally only be done at large bases. In the first of the anime series Kaine, Tapp, and Light accidentally pilot a D-weapons and register themselves to the machine becoming official pilots.

XD-01 Dragonar-1 (ドラゴナー-1, Doragonā - 1) - This Dragonar is an Metal Armor unit designed for Close Quarters Combat. pilot is Kaine Wakaba and It is also nickname as D-1. It has two radar receivers on the top of its head that also serve as communication antennas. Its dual eyes are image sensors with internal light-emitting elements .Its maneuverability is excellent but its fuel capacity and long-range attack capabilities are reduced accordingly, leading to the Cavalier 0. The secondary leg armor is equipped with Vetronics and the chest air intakes have a honeycomb structure for improved bullet resistance. The dorsal armor is equipped with booster nozzles. Normally two are used but at maximum acceleration, the armor deploys, exposing six. It also has an A.I navigation system called "Clara."

XD-01SR Dragonar-1 Custom (ドラゴナー1カスタム, Doragonā 1 kasutamu) - The D-1 was upgrade at the Chongqing base in China under the supervision of Dr. Lang Plato. It was developed as a prototype operational aircraft, leveraging new technologies that had not been fully utilized during the Dragoon development and as a symbol of the Allied forces incorporating the D-weapon into independent guerrilla units. The frame was improved by 20% during the modification. Parts that had progressed to metal fatigue were replaced and the thermonuclear reactor was replaced with a new model. As a result, although the weight increased, the maneuverability was comparable to that of the standard D1. In addition 100% of the secondary armor was replaced with a new material reducing both the thickness and weight. Meanwhile, the armor thickness was reduced by 25%, while maintaining its strength. The internal vetronics were also completely replaced. The flight unit was replaced with the standard equipment. Like the Lifter 1 it uses thermonuclear jets for atmospheric flight but these must be replaced in space.

XDFU-01 Dragonar Lifter-1 (ドラゴナーリフター-1, Doragonārifutā - 1) -

XD-02 Dragonar-2 (ドラゴナー2, Doragonā - 2) -

XD-02SR Dragonar-2 Custom (ドラゴナー2カスタム, Doragonā 2 kasutamu) -

XDFU-02 Dragonar Lifter-2 (ドラゴナーリフター2, Doragonārifutā 2) -

XD-03 Dragonar-3 (ドラゴナー3, Doragonā - 3) -

XDFU-03 Dragonar Lifter-3 (ドラゴナーリフター3, Doragonārifutā 3) -

XD-04 Dragonar-4 (ドラゴナー4, Doragonā - 4) -

== Theme songs ==
Opening themes

- "Dream-Colored Chaser" (夢色チェイサー, Yume-Iro Cheisā) (episodes #1–26)
  Performed by Mami Ayukawa
  Music by Kyōhei Tsutsumi
  Lyrics by Machiko Ryū
  Arrangement by Shirō Sagisu
- "Starlight Serenade" (スターライト・セレナーデ, Sutāraito Serenāde) (episodes #27–48)
  Performed by Mami Yamase
  Music by Daisuke Inōe
  Lyrics by Yukinojō Mori
  Arrangement by Kazuo Ōtani

Ending themes

- "Searching for an Illusion (イリュージョンをさがして, Iryūjon o Sagashite) (episodes #1–26)
  Performed by Mami Ayukawa
  Music by Kōji Makaino
  Lyrics by Machiko Ryū
  Arrangement by Shirō Sagisu
- "Shiny Boy" (episodes #27–48)
  Performed by Mami Yamase
  Music by Daisuke Inōe
  Lyrics by Yukinojō Mori
  Arrangement by Kazuo Ōtani

== Production ==
Much confusion had surrounded the early release of this series even before it went on the air. The Japanese anime magazine Animec for example, still hailed the title under the working name "Stillevar", not "Dragonar", despite the fact that the mecha and character designs were already approved.

== Video games ==
Though it had no dedicated licensed games of its own, Dragonar has appeared in several related games. Its earliest known game appearance is in the PlayStation game developed by Banpresto titled "Real Robots Final Attack", which is a third-person VS shooter similar to Sega's Virtual-On series, with the D-1 Custom representing the series. Later, the series appeared in the 2001 game Super Robot Wars A, in which Kaine and friends were (unwillingly) mentored first by Gundam Wing's Lucrezia Noin, then later by Gundam 0083's South Burning. The series would later appear in the 2004 game Super Robot Wars MX, where Giganos took center stage as the primary Real Robot antagonists, even usurping the Titans and Neo-Zeon from the so-called "Holy Trinity of Gundam" (Zeta, Double-Zeta, and Char's Counterattack).

A late 2004 release saw Dragonar in Super Robot Wars GC/XO, using Giganos as an ally to Zeon, with the Dragonar storyline being closely tied in with the original Mobile Suit Gundam; upon being disabled (i.e. having their head and limbs destroyed and their body crippled), mass-produced Giganos units can be captured by the player's mothership, and then be sold for money, broken down for money and parts, or assigned to any pilot from the series. Dragonar's next video game appearance was in the 2005 game Another Century's Episode, a 3D action game produced by the team of Banpresto and FromSoftware. The game allowed players to control the D-1, D-2, D-3 and, surprisingly, the Gilgazamune, but not the Falguen. The year 2006 brings about Another Century's Episode 2, which features the Custom versions of the Dragonars, as well as the ability to use Meio's Falguen MAFFU and Min's Stark Dyne, as well as Gon Jem's Gilgazamune from the first game. They are still in Another Century's Episode 3 and Another Century's Episode Portable. Although the original type of D-1, D-2, and D-3 are gone, Meio's Falguen Custom, which never appears in the anime, will be added into the game.

The series also appear in Harobots, because as Sunrise's series, this series' units can act as 'wild' units, or player's units.

== See also ==
Gundam - From The first Real Robot franchise consider predecessor of anime with drama story, War of conflict and Original Timeline Universe.

Buddy Complex - Next Real Robot with flying equipment as new successor of previous use.
