= List of Baki the Grappler characters =

Several major characters from the franchise, as seen in Baki. Clockwise from top; Kaoru Hanayama, Doppo Orochi, Goki Shibukawa, Baki Hanma and Kaio Retsu.

The manga series Baki the Grappler and its sequels feature a large cast of characters created by Keisuke Itagaki. It follows teenager Baki Hanma as he trains and tests his fighting skills against a variety of different opponents in deadly, no rules hand-to-hand combat. His goal is to eventually defeat his ruthless father Yujiro Hanma, who is touted as "the strongest being on earth" and whom he despises. Many of the characters are fighters trained in various forms of martial arts with skills that reach superhuman levels.

== Main characters ==
=== Baki Hanma ===
Voiced by: Masami Kikuchi (anime), Kappei Yamaguchi (OVA), Nobunaga Shimazaki (ONA) (Japanese); Robert McCollum (anime), Troy Baker (ONA; Netflix Dub), Blake Jackson (ONA; Sentai Filmworks Dub) (English)

Baki Hanma (範馬 刃牙, Hanma Baki) has been training in martial arts since the age of three, and has trained under various teachers and coaches throughout his life. At the age of thirteen, he decided to take his training into his own hands and left the coaches to perform more intense training in the footsteps of his father, Yujiro Hanma. He later meets with his father and becomes disillusioned as to his father's true character, and afterwards, aims to defeat and kill him. Baki first fought in the no-rules arena run by Mitsunari Tokugawa at fifteen, and went on to become its champion without losing once. Including techniques from many different martial arts, he does not adhere to any specific style. Fighting once a month, Baki thoroughly studies his opponent leading up to their match. He eventually develops the ogre/demon face on his back when fighting his brother, Jack Hammer, but manages to suppress it. Unlike Yujiro, Baki chooses to control his killing intent and fight his battles fair and honorably no matter what the outcome. Baki has encounters with all the escaped convicts in the second manga series. He is then faced with a new foe from the prehistoric era, Pickle the caveman, after Kaio Retsu and Katsumi Orochi are defeated by him. The outcome of the match between Baki and Pickle could be considered to have gone either way: Pickle was the one who was left standing after the fight with Baki, but inadvertently used a "weapon", in the form of a martial arts technique, to beat him. As stated by the onlookers a "weapon" is a tool used by the "weak" against the "strong", which would make Baki the true winner of the fight for having cornered Pickle. Subsequently, Baki's wish to have dinner with his father like a normal family is granted. Yujiro Hanma goes to his house and eats the dinner prepared by his son, dispensing never before seen knowledge with class and proper mannerisms. As thanks for preparing the meal, Yujiro invites Baki to a dinner "in his own style" at Tokyo's best restaurant. At one point during the dinner Baki asks Yujiro why he had to kill his mother; Yujiro refuses to explain his motives "to a resentful brat" and Baki grows confrontational. This triggers their final conflict, and the final part of the manga. The gruesome fight that ensues leaves Baki a broken mess despite using remarkable techniques that earn him the praise of his father. However, Yujiro recognizes Baki's unique fighting spirit and acknowledges that he can no longer be so selfish as to call himself the strongest being on Earth. To thank Baki he starts using imaginary cooking to prepare Miso soup. Baki plays along but says the soup is a little salty, which angers Yujiro, but when he "tastes" it himself he discovers that the miso was, in fact, salty. Baki claims the moral victory due to being able to get his father involved in his own fantasy. The conflict ends in a tie, both fighters recognizing each other's greatness. In the fourth manga, he is still seen participating in arena fights and engaging in regular intensive training, but has become bored with his day-to-day life.

=== Yujiro Hanma ===
Voiced by: Kenji Nomura (anime), Akio Ōtsuka (ONA) (Japanese); Matthew Tompkins (anime); Kirk Thornton (ONA) (English)

Yujiro Hanma (範馬 勇次郎, Hanma Yūjiro), nicknamed "Ogre" (オーガ, Ōga) and often called "the Strongest Being on Earth" (地上最強の生物, Chijō Saikyō no Seibutsu), is the father of Baki Hanma and Jack Hammer. A genius fighter, he is known to have mastered all styles of unarmed combat. His repertoire apparently includes all of the well-known fighting styles like karate, taekwondo, boxing, judo, ju-jitsu and wrestling, as well as some more esoteric ones such as the secret udondi style, passed onto only the eldest sons of the Ryukyu Kingdom royal family. He has been fighting on the battlefields, using only his bare hands, since the age of sixteen, when he fought against both American and Vietcong forces in the Vietnam War. Since then, it appears that he has obtained respect from the American forces even going so far as having them recognize him as his own national power, with each U.S. president swearing friendship to him. He is sadistic and referred to as a monster, even by Baki, who claims he can not go a day without hurting someone. When Yujiro flexes his back muscles, it appears to take the shape of a demon or ogre's face, increasing his strength and combat abilities. It is said that when he started fighting for pleasure rather than survival, the image of the demon's face appeared on his back. His many physical displays of sheer strength include: stopping an earthquake with a punch to the ground, being struck by lightning with no effect on health, ripping a wooden table into two and then those two pieces together into quarters, cutting a glass table in half only using his finger as if it were a diamond, drinking a whole bottle of high grade Brandy in one gulp with no intoxication. Since his fight with Baki went viral, Yujiro is annoyed to find that he has gained unwanted fans and public attention, and has referenced several young children asking for his autograph since the fight.

=== Doppo Orochi ===
Voiced by: Mugihito (anime), Shōzō Iizuka (OVA), Takayuki Sugō (ONA) (Japanese); Greg Dulcie (anime), Steve Blum (ONA) (English)

Doppo Orochi (愚地 独歩, Orochi Doppo), known by numerous nicknames such as the "God of Martial Arts" (武神), "Tiger Slayer" (虎殺し, Tora Koroshi) and "Man Eater Orochi" (人食いオロチ), is a 10th dan karate grand master and head of the Shinshinkai (神心会空) style of karate. Practicing martial arts for 50 years, he is one of the few people in the world able to stand toe-to-toe with Yujiro. Doppo has two scars on his face from when Yujiro jumped him ten years earlier. In their proper fight that takes place in the underground arena, Yujiro gouges Doppo's right eye out and kills him by stopping his heart. However, Doppo is revived by Kureha Shinogi. In the underground tournament, Doppo fights Richard Filth in round one and Yu Amanai in round two before facing another master, Goki Shibukawa, in round three, which he loses after a brutal match. After that loss, he decides to close down his dojo and start his training all over again. He eventually fights the escaped American convict Dorian in the second manga series. Dorian manages to cut off Doppo's hand with a strange wire-cutting technique in which he uses a wire blade projected from a lighter. Doppo later avenges this loss when he, Katsumi, and Retsu track Dorian down. Shortly after this however, Dorian escapes from the hospital and uses an explosive that is implanted into his hand to blow off part of Doppo's face. Doppo later returns to have a battle with Mohammad Alai Jr. Doppo is the star of the spinoff manga Baki Gaiden: Kenjin.

=== Kiyosumi Kato ===
Voiced by: Takehiro Murozono (anime), Kazumi Tanaka (OVA) (Japanese); Robbie Daymond (English)

Kiyosumi Kato (加藤 清澄) is a top student of Doppo Orochi who believes karate should be no-holds barred and fights attacking areas such as the eyes. Three years ago, he left Doppo's dojo and worked for the yakuza, honing his skills in fights against guns and knives. After both watching Baki, Doppo shows Kato the underground arena. Kato's attitude is best described as arrogant, but usually being the butt of a joke; especially around Doppo, Katsumi, Tokugawa, and Baki. However, it is shown that he truly admires and cares for Doppo. Kato's first opponent in the tournament is injured by Yasha Ape Jr. before the match, so he tries to fight the ape, but is also beaten and drops out due to injury. Kato shows up in the second manga series and fights against the convict Dorian in his secret underground hiding place. Kato has his face scarred horribly from a broken glass bottle and is announced "dead" upon his body being found by Retsu in the Shinshinkai building. It is later revealed that Kato is alive.

=== Atsushi Suedo ===
Voiced by: Yosikazu Nagano (anime), Kōji Totani (OVA) (Japanese); Liam O'Brien (English; Netflix Dub), Michael Wronski (English; Sentai Filmworks Dub)

Atsushi Suedo (末堂 厚) is a 3rd dan Shinshinkai karate student, who is defeated by Baki in a karate tournament. When Kato vandalized the Shinshinkai building, Suedo was one of many who tried to defeat him. Like the rest of his friends, he failed miserably. He later has a fight with Dorian in the convicts saga, to avenge Kato's defeat, but he fails and is nearly killed by falling from a rollercoaster. He reappears in the third manga, alive and well.

=== Mitsunari Tokugawa ===
Voiced by: Naomi Kusumi (anime), Naoki Tatsuta (OVA) (Japanese); Matthew Yang King (English)

Mitsunari Tokugawa (徳川 光成, Tokugawa Mitsunari) is an old man of very small stature who runs the underground arena beneath the Tokyo Dome, where fighters of any style compete in hand-to-hand combat with no rules. While not a fighter himself, he is very knowledgeable not only about martial arts, but about the fighters as well, such as their birthdays and family members. Tokugawa has the final say in each and every one of the battles that take place in his arena. While he usually prefers to keep every fight in order, he will sometimes bend the rules if it means amplifying the fight in some way, even going so far as to threaten one of his own doctors with a knife when they tried to stop a fight. In order to find the strongest alive, he decides to hold the underground tournament in arena. Tokugawa is close personal friends with Doppo and Antonio Igari, as well as acquaintances (though not exactly friendly) with Yujiro. He is one of the few people to ever outsmart Yujiro. When Yujiro attempted to upset the balance of his tournament, he had his snipers, who he had secretly stationed around the arena, to shoot him with enough tranquilizer to put down a blue whale. This gives him the very rare achievement of being the only person who has ever knocked Yujiro unconscious.

=== Izo Motobe ===
Voiced by: Masayuki Omoro

Izo Motobe (本部 以蔵, Motobe Izō) is an old Japanese jujutsu master, who starts training Baki for his fight against his former student Junichi Hanada, but it turns into a fight against Mount Toba. Having lost to Yujiro eight years ago, Motobe develops new techniques in order to fight Yujiro, but usually fails. Motobe participates in the tournament where he is beaten in the fourth match by sumo wrestler Kinryuzan. He continues to offer commentary for future fights and insight into various and often obscure techniques an example would be Baki's life like shadowboxing technique. He later appears again in the second manga, this time fighting against the convict Ryuuko Yanagi. After seeing Baki and Yujiro fight he takes his training even further, even claiming that he will "protect" Yujiro from Musashi.

=== Kosho Shinogi ===
Voiced by: Kazuhiro Tanaka (anime), Kaneto Shiozawa (OVA)

Kosho Shinogi (鎬 昴昇, Shinogi Kōshō) is a karate expert who fights using a style where the attacks are not blunt blows, but slashes that cut the opponent. His special technique allows him to cut his opponents' nerves, blood vessels, and lymph ducts, earning him the nickname "Cord Cutter Shinogi" (紐切り鎬). In his fight with Baki, Kosho disables Baki's right arm and blinds his right eye, but is knocked out. In the first round of the tournament, he fights his older brother Kureha, who gives up after seeing Kosho's resilience. In round two, he fights Goki Shibukawa and though he breaks Goki's fake eye he still loses. Kosho returns in the second manga series, and fights against the convict Doyle. Doyle uses an explosive device in his chest to defeat Kosho, and it is later shown that Kureha has been taking care of his burn wounds following the battle. He is shown putting himself through harsh training after seeing Baki and Yujiro fight.

=== Kureha Shinogi ===
Voiced by: Yukie Maeda (adult), Mitsuru Miyamoto (teenage) (Japanese)

Kureha Shinogi (鎬 紅葉, Shinogi Kureha) is the older brother of Kosho who is very narcissistic and trains to develop the perfect body. He claims to have the traits of several Olympic level athletes, the speed of a sprinter, the endurance of a marathon runner, the flexibility of an amateur wrestler and the reaction time and strength of a heavyweight boxer, yet he does not have any formal training in martial arts. Kureha is also a surgical genius able to do surgical wonders, such as restarting a heart barehanded without piercing the skin, but uses humans as test subjects. Kureha fights Baki and is essentially beaten in one final blow that rips his stomach. Ironically, he is saved by one of his victims when he needs a blood transfusion. In the tournament, he fights Kosho and, though he severely pummels him, Kureha decides to give up to let his younger brother continue in the tournament. During that match, despite losing his eyesight when Kosho severed two of his cords, he surgically fixed his nerves during his fight. He serves as tournament medic as the matches go on and tried to stop Jack Hammer from using any steroids only to be beaten by him. Later, he helps Jack develop new ways of getting stronger without the use of steroids. He decides to puts aside his medical profession and puts himself through harsh training after seeing Baki and Yujiro's fight.

=== Gerry Strydom ===
Voiced by: Hidetoshi Nakamura (Japanese); Mark Stoddard (English)

Gerry Strydom (ゲリー・ストライダム, Gerī Sutoraidamu) is a captain and later general in the US Army and Yujiro's companion and comrade-in-arms. He originally met Yujiro as an enemy in the Vietnam War, where he was nearly killed by him. He eventually developed an admiration for Yujiro, and now travels and fights alongside him on battlefields around the world. He somewhat understands Yujiro's mentality and mentions that he is the only person to bring the United States to its knees. He is also a friend and mentor of Baki's, who keeps him up to date on Yujiro's whereabouts.

=== Kaoru Hanayama ===
Voiced by: Masayuki Nakata (teenager), Takuya Eguchi, Motoko Kumai (child) (ONA) (Japanese); Kyle Hebert (anime), Greg Chun (ONA) (English)

Kaoru Hanayama (花山 薫, Hanayama Kaoru) is a teenage yakuza leader and strongman with a large X-shaped scar on his face. He has scars from multiple bullet wounds on his chest, and his full back tattoo looks like a jigsaw puzzle due to the many scars from blade wounds. When his father died he was adopted by his uncle who saw great potential in him. His code of honor is great as he chooses not to fall in battle even if it means his death; a family vow which has been held in a long tradition passed from generations and tied to his tattoo. His grip is so strong that if he grabs an opponent's arm he can cause it to explode from restricting the blood flow. As the strongest yakuza in Japan, Hanayama was hired at fifteen by Hitoshi Kuriyagawa to fight a thirteen-year-old Baki, which he states he lost. He is looked upon as an older brother figure to Baki. Four years later, Hanayama participates in the underground tournament, beating his first opponent, Bunnoshin Inagi, by breaking both his arms and backbone with one punch. Hanayama then fights Katsumi, where he is eventually declared the loser after taking three direct mach punches, despite the fact that he was still standing. Katsumi later admits that he lost the fight three times, despite officially winning the match. In the second manga series, Spec manages to place a handful of bullets into Hanayama's mouth and slam it shut, causing them to explode and create two large holes in Hanayama's mouth. Although Hanayama won the battle, he wears a facemask for most of the series. Later on, he is shown surgically treated. He reappears briefly in the third manga series, having a strength test with Pickle in the streets, interrupted by Baki. He also appears in the fourth, portrayed as one of the characters who has become bored with life. To relieve his boredom, he challenges Yujiro to a street fight, but is easily beaten. Hanayama is the star of two spinoff manga; Baki Gaiden: Scarface and Baki Gaiden: Kizuzura.

=== Katsumi Orochi ===
Voiced by: Keiji Fujiwara (teenager), Yuko Maekawa (child) (Japanese); Ray Chase (English)

Katsumi Orochi (愚地 克巳, Orochi Katsumi) is a 3rd dan Shinshinkai karate prodigy and Doppo's adopted son. The 20-year-old is Doppo's entrant into the tournament. He fights Roland Istaz in round one, defeating him easily. He then has a brutal match with Hanayama, which he wins after having to use the mach punch technique he was saving for Yujiro. In round three, he loses miserably to Retsu getting knocked out in one punch. Retsu was impressed that Katsumi could take one of his punches. A rematch in the second manga series is interrupted when the convict Dorian comes into the Shinshinkai building and attacks Katsumi. Katsumi also later trains the convict Doyle in Shinshinkai Karate. He has a fight with Pickle which he loses despite his new Mach Punch technique, and as a result he got his right arm torn off and several limbs broken. He is seen in hospital recovering from his wounds shortly after. But as a result of their fight, Pickle and Katsumi end up gaining a mutual respect for one another.

=== Goki Shibukawa ===
Voiced by: Hiroshi Naka (Japanese); Vic Mignogna (ONA, Season 1), Kyle McCarley (ONA, Season 2) (English)

Goki Shibukawa (渋川 剛気, Shibukawa Gōki) is a small and elderly master of aikido. His style makes use of the martial arts principle of aiki, which uses an opponent's attacks against themselves. In the tournament, he defeats Roger Harlon in round one, Kosho Shinogi in round two, where it is learned he has a glass eye, and Doppo in round three. Goki then loses to Jack Hammer in the fourth round. In the second manga series, he teams up with Baki to face the Japanese convict Ryukoh Yanagi. He also has a friendly sparring match with Biscuit Oliva and another match with Mohammad Alai Jr. When not fighting, he is quite eccentric (as well as a bit senile) as he lives the day and fears nothing. Goki is modeled after aikido master Gozo Shioda.

=== Kaio Retsu ===
Voiced by: Kunihiko Yasui, Rikiya Koyama (ONA) (Japanese); Kaiji Tang (English)

Kaio Retsu (烈 海王, Retsu Kaiō) is a Chinese kenpo practitioner who fights and easily beats Sergei Taktarov in his first match in the tournament. He beats Mount Toba in round two, and destroys Katsumi Orochi in round three. He then makes it to the semi-finals of the tournament and is pitted against Baki Hanma where Baki nearly kills him by breaking his neck. Despite his great knowledge in his style, there is one flaw in his system that Baki seems to possess. In the second manga series, he has encounters with the British convict Hector Doyle and American convict Dorian. Retsu brings Baki to China to cure his poisoned body and have him fight in a Chinese Tournament. He reappears in the third manga, during the Pickle arc, having a fight with the prehistoric man and losing it. He then gets his leg eaten by Pickle, as a "gift" for his victory. He later trains Katsumi so that he can become stronger before his fight with Pickle. Retsu later trains in boxing, making a name for himself in America. After his fight with Musashi, in which the use of weapons was allowed, his internal organs and spine were sliced open, resulting in his death. In the fifth series, Retsu's right arm is given to Katsumi as a replacement for the one he lost to Pickle.

=== Jack Hammer ===
Voiced by: Kōichi Sakaguchi, Kenta Miyake (ONA) (Japanese)

Jack Hammer (ジャック・ハンマー, Jakku Hanmā) is a Canadian pitfighter and Baki's half brother. He is the son of Yujiro and a Canadian United Nations operative who Yujiro met in Vietnam during the Vietnam War. Like Baki, he has since childhood wished to surpass his father in strength and martial ability. His obsession to defeat his father led to extreme overtraining at various fighting gyms which led to the deterioration of his body. He claimed he will never be able to defeat his father with normal training. After his encounter with the Yujiro-inspired scientist, he received from him steroids to match his overtraining and gained immense power in the process. One of his main techniques is biting, and he can bite hard enough to easily crush wood with his teeth. He fights Sergio Silva in round one, Misaki Kengo in round two, the undefeated Alexander Gallen in round three, and Goki Shibukawa in round four. He then fights Baki Hanma in the finals of the tournament where he congratulates his brother for a well fought victory. Afterwards, he takes on his father and is soundly defeated. In the second manga series, Jack battles Russian convict Sikorsky and Mohammad Alai Jr. He is treated by Kureha Kosho by having his limbs extended, making Jack even bigger than when he fought in the tournament. He reappears in the third manga, in the military base where Pickle is captive, along with seven other fighters. He fights Pickle in the underground area. First they do a "bite challenge", and Jack gets his jaw's flesh stripped off, leaving his teeth and muscles. It appears Jack has taken drugs once again, and he manages to hit Pickle many times while also getting his right ear bitten off. Then, he get a clean hit from Pickle with full power to the jaw, and get his jaw as well as his teeth and parts of his cranium broken. However, he choose to continue to fight, making Pickle run out of fear, but then Jack is knocked out once again, and tied to the flag of a building. Upon learning this, Jack has a mental breakdown. After being one of many witnesses to Baki's fight with Yujiro he trains even harder to beat his father with new found determination. After finishing all of his body modifications, he fought Motobe in a park and was thrashed, having all of his teeth knocked out. He would later obtain new teeth made of titanium.

=== Kozue Matsumoto ===
Voiced by: Sachiko Kojima (anime), Yumi Touma (OVA), Sora Amamiya (ONA) (Japanese); Cherami Leigh (English)

Kozue Matsumoto (松本 梢江, Matumoto Kozue) ia a girl from Baki's school, whose mother is Baki's landlord. Her father fought and died in the underground arena. She cares deeply for Baki, but denies when asked. Baki invites her to watch the tournament. Though she disapproves, Kozue better understands Baki's resolve after visiting Emi's grave site. After Baki's first tournament match, he reveals that he cares for Kozue. She becomes his love interest in the second series, and makes love with him just before his fight with Yanagi, allowing Baki to become a "full man". She also becomes the love interest of Alai Jr., and despite loving Baki, she develops a cheerful relationship with him. Kozue makes a brief appearance in the third series, after Baki's fight with Pickle. She walks Baki to school while reminiscing about Baki's fight with Alai Jr. In the final fight between Baki and Yujiro, Yujiro approves of her being Baki's lover and thanks her for making him strong.

== Baki the Grappler characters ==
=== Emi Akezawa ===
Voiced by: Yurika Hino (anime), Megumi Hayashibara (ONA) (Japanese); Wendy Powell (anime) (English)

Emi Akezawa (朱沢 江珠, Akezawa Emi) is Baki's very wealthy mother. She and her former husband, Eiichi Akezawa, witnessed Yujiro fight while on vacation. Angered by her infatuation with Yujiro, Eiichi hit her. Having noticed that Emi loves the sight of blood and people in pain, Yujiro breaks into their house, breaks Eiichi's neck, and claims Emi will bear him a child. However, Yujiro does not love her, he simply tasks her with raising Baki to be a warrior like himself. Emi never acts lovingly toward her son, believing loyalty to Yujiro to be more important than a motherly bond. However, seeing Baki being severely beaten by Yujiro in their fight, Emi has a sudden burst of maternal protection and attacks Yujiro herself. Although Baki survives, Yujiro kills Emi, breaking her back with a bearhug; she spends her final moments cradling her son. Delusional, Baki later walks through the city carrying her body on his back acting as if she is alive, before leaving her in a field wreathed in flowers.

=== Hitoshi Kuriyagawa ===
Voiced by: Masayuki Komuro (Japanese); R. Bruce Elliott (English)

Hitoshi Kuriyagawa (栗谷川 等, Kuriyagawa Hitoshi) is Emi Akizawa's personal assistant whose job is to keep an eye on young Baki and set up fights for him at her direction. Despite his age, he is a capable fighter himself. Despite working for Emi, he is still shocked at how she and Yujiro treat their son.

=== Kinuyo Matsumoto ===
Voiced by: Sanae Takagi (1994 OVA), Yurika Hino (anime), Miki Nagasawa (ONA) (Japanese); Lydia Mackay (anime), Colleen Villard (ONA) (English)

Kinuyo Matsumoto (松本 絹代, Matsumoto Kinuyo) is Kozue's mother and Baki's landlord. Her husband fought and died in the underground arena. For years she hid the truth from Kozue. Kinuyo admires Baki as he reminds her of her late husband.

=== Detective Kido ===
Voiced by: Naomi Kusumi

Detective Kido (木戸 刑事) is a neighborhood detective who turns a blind eye to young Baki's street fights because he knows he can not subdue him. He is off struck by Baki's nature and usually hangs out by Baki's house smoking a cigarette. He eventually learns why Baki is the way he is and is shocked by this revelation. Like Kuriyagawa, he serves as a father figure to Baki.

=== Kitazawa ===
Voiced by: Takuo Kawamura (Japanese); Mike McFarland (English)

Kitazawa (北沢) is a street thug from Baki's school, Kitazawa hates Baki because of his fighting skills. He even gathered 100 thugs to fight Baki, with 37 of them defeated before Kido broke it up. Hanayama threatens Kitazawa into telling him everything he knows about Baki. After Baki returns even stronger after training in the mountains, Kitazawa finally gives up. He even later helps Baki by hiring street fighters for training.

=== Kizaki ===
Voiced by: Jin Yamanoi (Japanese); Phil Parsons (English)

Kizaki (木崎) is Kaoru Hanayama's bodyguard and right-hand man, he does most of the talking for Hanayama. Kizaki was a friend of Kaoru's father and his sister adopted Kaoru after his father was killed. He's seen Kaoru's strength firsthand and has great confidence in him.

=== Reiichi Ando ===
Voiced by: Katsuhiro Kitagawa (Japanese); Jim Johnson (Netflix Dub), Michael Wronski (Sentai Filmworks Dub) (English)

Once a friend of Yujiro's, Reiichi Ando (安藤 玲一) is a giant man who lives as a hermit secluding himself deep in the woods of the Hida Mountains. In order to get strong enough to beat Yuri, Baki trains with Ando by eating a lot and chopping logs with his heavy ax. Ando is almost killed trying to save Baki from the Yasha Ape. He briefly reappears during Baki and Yujiro's fight, and four years later having brought Yasha Ape to the underground tournament. He appears in the second manga series, searching for a cure for Baki after he got poisoned by Yanagi, but fails and then Retsu brings Baki to the Dai Raitai Sai.

=== Yasha Ape ===
Voiced by: Eiji Yanagisawa (Japanese); Bob Carter (English)

While training in the Hida Mountains, Baki encounters a 2-meter tall Yasha Ape (夜叉猿, Yasha-zaru). Although he wanted to fight barehanded, Baki is forced to set the Yasha on fire to save Ando in their first fight. In the second three months later, Baki pokes its left eye, which the Yasha then pulls out and eats. Baki wins the fight, but the Yasha is able to walk away. As a sign of respect, Baki returns the skull of the Yasha's mate, who was previously killed by Yujiro, and likewise, the beast gives Baki one of his fangs. As Baki departs, it is revealed that he is raising three children on his own. Later, Yasha is decapitated by Yujiro, who then shows his head to Baki upon challenging him to a fight. Four years later, one of the Yasha's children is brought to the underground tournament where it injures several fighters including Kyosumi Kato, before being stopped by Katsumi Orochi.

=== Yuri Chakovsky ===
Voiced by: Masaya Takatsuka (Japanese); Chris Rager (English)

Yuri Chakovsky (ユリー・チャコフスキー) is a professional boxer and the first opponent to ever soundly defeat Baki. He is from a Mongolian tribe of fierce warriors. Yuri was a junior welterweight boxing champion when he beat Baki, before moving up to heavyweight. Due to Kuriyagawa bumping Yuri's rematch with Baki ahead of Hanayama's, Hanayama breaks Yuri's left arm. However, Yuri holds no grudge against Hanayama, and the two later help Baki train for his fight against Yujiro.

=== 1st Airborne Brigade ===
The 1st Airborne Brigade (第1空挺団) of the Japan Ground Self-Defense Force. An elite team of five men able to defeat over 50 cars and tanks without firearms. In order to prepare to fight his father in a month, thirteen-year-old Baki goes to a forest in Hokkaido to fight these soldiers at Strydom's suggestion. He first fights Sanada (真田), an expert in knife combat. Sanada's name is only given in the anime, where he is voiced by Dai Matsumoto. Baki's then immediately fights the grappler Kuraishi (倉石), from whom he learns how to fight "dirty." Kuraishi is voiced by Tōru Ōkawa in the Japanese version of the anime, and voiced by Daniel Penz in the English dub of the anime. The identical twin Chiba Brothers (千葉兄弟) fight Baki together. Chiba is a close combat and blade expert, while his brother, Sanada, is a wire and trap specialist. Their name is only revealed in the anime, where the older brother is voiced by Tomohiro Nishimura and the younger by Shinichi Namiki. After the brigade is defeated, they bond with Baki.

=== Gaia ===
Voiced by: Kouji Yuusa (Japanese); Chuck Huber (English)

Gaia (ガイア) is the leader of the 1st Airborne Brigade, who has multiple personality disorder. Once a reckless mercenary called Nomura (野村) who loved killing, after facing the "ultimate fear" when faced with a firing squad during the Ugandan Civil War, he lost his hair and gained supersensory ability. However, when it comes to jungle warfare, he is considered to be the king and is often called "Mr. War" (ミスター戦争). As Nomura he is best described as a weakling, but when the situation is right and his adrenaline starts pumping, the Gaia personality will manifest itself to fight. Said to be Yujiro's equal in combat, Gaia utterly despises Yujiro, stating he is nothing but a thrill seeker that fights for pleasure. He fights Baki in a brutal and unique fight, but ultimately loses. Before Baki's fight with his father, Gaia decides to fight Yujiro first, but is badly beaten. Gaia returns in the second manga series, replacing Jack during his fight with the Russian convict Sikorsky. He proceeds to defeat Sikorsky with ease, and terrorizes Sikorsky into admitting defeat. His three philosophies when fighting are one, take care of your body and give it rest; two, free your body from the control of your mind; and finally, use every part of your surroundings as a weapon. In the fourth series, Gaia no longer works for the JGSDF, and is seen working as a bodyguard for the new American president. He is the star of the spinoff manga Baki Gaiden: Gaia.

=== Shumei Kano ===
Voiced by: Kenichi Ono

Shumei Kano (加納 秀明, Kanō Shūmei) is the chief of security at the Tokugawa residence and a fighter in the underground arena. Kano has no particular style, but imitates his opponent's stance to anticipate their movements. He's a defensive fighter who rarely attacks, and thus his offense is not very strong. Kano is easily defeated by Baki after landing only a single punch. After defeating Kano and all of the other security, Tokugawa grants Baki's request to start fighting in underground arena from the lowest level.

=== Natsue Orochi ===
Voiced by: Ako Mayama

Natsue Orochi (愚地 夏恵, Orochi Natsue) is Doppo's wife and Katsumi's adoptive mother. She is very timid and, like Kozue, she always fears for her loved ones' safety. Unlike Kozue, however, she supports Doppo's violent lifestyle and always cheers for him calling him her Superman, it is unknown if she ever directly knew that Doppo had been killed by Yujiro or whether it was just that part of her knew something was terribly wrong. She appears frequently throughout the series, showing up to watch Doppo fight in the tournament vs The Bouncer and Yu Amanai (during this match Doppo completely ignored Amanai's opening monologue and yelled into the stands proclaiming his love for Natsuki and that he was going to win it for her). She was thought to be killed by Dorian during the escaped convict story but in fact, he left her unharmed. Later in Baki Son Of Ogre when Katsumi prepares to face off against Pickle, she appears before him saying she had contacted Katsumi's real mother to wish him luck before the fight, Katsumi embraced his adoptive mother thanking her for raising him and always supporting him at which point Natsuki bursts into tears of confusion saying she wasn't his real mother, in his head Katsumi says to himself he doesn't care what she says and that she has always been the best mother anyone could want being supportive and loving.

=== Dr. John ===
Voiced by: Yosikazu Nagano

Dr. John (ジョン博士, Jon Hakase) is an elderly doctor who is obsessed with using science to augment the human body. He was inspired by a chance encounter with Yujiro, whom he saw kill a polar bear with his bare hands ten years ago. Three years ago, John discovered Jack Hammer, who was frail and emaciated due to overtraining, but single-minded in his determination to continue. With his tolerance for pain and resolve to put his life on the line, Jack became the doctor's perfect test subject for his experimental drugs. After only a few weeks, Jack reached peak athletic performance, breaking world records in sprinting and weightlifting every day. However, John comes to believe that Jack has become too strong and crossed into the realm of the "demonic". Feeling remorse, John shoots himself in the head after writing a letter to Jack, who is competing in the underground tournament. In the English dub of the anime, his name is changed to "Dr. Buren".

=== Diane Neil ===
Voiced by: Yurika Hino

Diane Neil (ダイアン・ニール, Daian Nīru) is the Canadian mother of Jack Hammer. During the Vietnam War, she posed as "Jane" (ジェーン, Jēn) and acted as if she was attracted to Yujiro's fighting skills and fought with him against the American soldiers. However, Yujiro eventually reveals that he knows her real identity, that she works for the United Nations and that her romantic interest is part of a ploy to capture and kill him, and rapes her. Diane was imprisoned for failing her mission, as it resulted in many casualties, and gave birth to Jack while in prison. She reappears very briefly at the very end of the first series, watching as Jack is loaded into an ambulance after fighting Yujiro.

=== Tournament fighters ===
Mount Toba
Voiced by: Yū Shimaka (Japanese); Christopher R. Sabat (English)

Shohei Toba (斗羽正平, Toba Shōhei) is a veteran, giant professional wrestler known all over the world as "Mount Toba" (マウント斗羽). When fellow wrestler and Baki's upcoming opponent, Junichi Hanada, causes a locker-room incident, Toba badly beats him for disrespect and takes his place against Baki. It looks as if he is about to defeat Baki, but after 30 years of wrestling, Toba's right leg gives out. Baki lets Toba lose with honor by smashing his leg so he can not stand. He later fights in the underground tournament as a replacement when Yasha Ape Jr. injures two fighters. Toba goes up against Retsu and submits when Retsu nullifies an attack and causes him to hurt his own damaged leg. Like Antonio Igari, he also fights dirty; throwing his shirt over Retsu to bind him and kicking sand into his face. He later provides commentary for Igari's matches in the tournament. He is one of the stars of the Grappler Baki Gaiden manga, where he has a wrestling match with Igari. He appears to die at the end of the match and a grand funeral is held in his honor, but it is revealed that he faked his death. His appearance and name are based on Japanese professional wrestler Giant Baba.

Kanji Igari
Voiced by: Toru Okawa (anime), Kiyoyuki Yanada (ONA) (Japanese); Brice Armstrong (anime), DC Douglas (ONA) (English)

Kanji Igari (猪狩 完至, Igari Kanji) is a veteran professional wrestler known all over the world by his ring name "Antonio Igari" (アントニオ猪狩). In the tournament, he fights and defeats American kickboxer Rob Robinson in the third fight, and sumo wrestler Kinryuzan in the second, before losing to Baki in the third. Before the third match, he realizes he could lose and goes so far to kneel and cry, begging Baki to let him win but this is simply one of his means of psychological warfare to make Baki underestimate him. He is well known for fighting dirty; kicking Baki in the testicles, pretending to give up so he could sneak attack Baki, and even going so far as to hire an actress who looks enough like Baki's mother to try and psych Baki out further. He is one of the stars of the Grappler Baki Gaiden manga, where he has a wrestling match with Mount Toba. In the second manga series, Antonio is defeated two times and left for dead by Sikorsky who scars his face badly in the shape of a star. However he survives and reappears in helping transport Sikorsky to the Korakuen arena. At the end, he witnesses the shadow boxing fight that Baki visualizes against Yujiro. His appearance and name are based on Japanese professional wrestler Antonio Inoki.

Andreas Regan
Voiced by: Shinya Hashimoto

Andreas Regan (アンドレアス・リーガン) is a professional wrestler of immense size, he is 2.4 meters tall and weighs over 310 kilos. He is easily the biggest man in the tournament, second only to Alexander Gallen, and makes Mount Toba look small. Andreas easily loses to Baki in the first match of the tournament. Baki convinces him to use all of his might which surprises him because no one has ever asked him to use all his power.

Zulu
Voiced by: Takuo Kawamura

More of a beast than a man, Zulu (ズール) is a buff fighter from Brazil that uses Vale Tudo and never speaks. He beats Muay Thai kickboxer Dentoranee Jitpika in the second match, before fighting Baki. Zulu attacks before the match is officially begun and knocks Baki unconscious. He is declared the winner, with Tokugawa citing the 1991 match between Andy Hug and Francisco Filho as a comparable precedent. However, due to his animalistic nature, Zulu attacks Baki again as he sees the latter walking away. This time, Baki crushes one of Zulu's testicles and is officially declared the winner. Baki helps Zulu back to his feet to finish their trilogy, which Baki ultimately wins with another groin strike.

Kinryuzan
Voiced by: Takuo Kawamura (Japanese); Kyle Hebert (English)

Kinryuzan (金竜山) is a yokozuna in professional sumo wrestling. He beats Izo Motobe in the fourth match of the tournament, before accidentally breaking his own shoulder in the fight with Kanji Igari in round two, which results in his father/oyakata throwing in the towel. Kinryuzan's oyakata later notes that the position Igari had put the yokozuna in prior to his arm breaking would have resulted in a loss had the fight been a sumo match. Afterwards, Kinryuzan rips off his own topknot as a sign of disgrace and vows to start over from square one. This impresses Igari, who vows to win the tournament for him. Later, Kinryuzan almost has his back broken by Yujiro.

Sergei Taktarov

Sergei Taktarov (セルゲイ・タクタロフ) is a sambo fighter from Russia. Sergei breaks Andreas Regan's arm before his match with Retsu as a show of strength. He is easily beaten by Retsu in the fifth match when his neck is broken. He is brutally beaten again, this time by Alexander Gallen because he failed Russia.

Bunnoshin Inagi
Voiced by: Takuo Kawamura.

Bunnoshin Inagi (稲城 文之信, Inagi Bunnoshin) is a Nihon Kempo fighter, who faces Kaoru Hanayama in the first round. Before the match begins, he taunts Hanayama by offering him a face guard, which Hanayama promptly crushes and rolls into a ball. In turn, Inagi is offered a katana by Kaoru, which he breaks with his fist. During the match Inagi breaks his own leg blocking an uppercut from Hanayama, before breaking both arms and his spine attempting to block a single punch. He passes out from the back pain while trying to put Hanayama in a submission.

Roland Istaz
Voiced by: Eiji Yanagisawa (teenager), Akeno Watanabe (child)

Roland Istaz (ローランド・イスタス, Rōrando Isutasu) is a catch wrestler trained by Bill Riley, who once fought Doppo Orochi to a draw. Known as the "Joint Fetishist" (関節愛好家), Istaz has had a compulsion to dismantle anything he sees connected since childhood, be it electronics or human joints. After surpassing his master, he flew to Africa and successfully wrestled a lion, before Riley intervened. Istaz faces Doppo's son Katsumi in round one, where he loses despite managing to dislocate two of Katsumi's joints. He later fights and is choked out by Yujiro. Roland is modeled after Karl Gotch, whose real name was "Charles Istaz". In the anime, his surname is "Gustaf" (グスタフ, Gusutafu).

Moko Li
Voiced by: Yoshikazu Nagano

Moko Li (李 猛虎) is the taekwondo instructor of the Korean marines. He fights Iron Michael in round one. Although Li appears to be winning by kicking Michael's legs from outside of the boxer's danger zone, he is knocked out in one punch when Michael uses the arena wall as Li goes in for the finishing blow. Li later fights and is knocked out in one axe kick by Yujiro.

Iron Michael
Voiced by: Mitsuru Ogata

Iron Michael (アイアン・マイケル, Aian Maikeru) is a heavyweight boxing champion. He knocks out Moko Li in the first round and fights Chiharu Shiba in the second. In the fight against Shiba, one of Michael's hands is broken and his trainer throws in the towel in order to protect his boxing career. However, Michael chooses to keep fighting and eventually breaks the other hand, causing his trainer to run into the ring and restrain him. As a result, his decision is overruled and he loses. He is later knocked out by Yujiro with an uppercut. Baki encounters Michael inside the Arizona Prison. Michael had been trying to become the strongest convict - a dream he gives up on. Before he is released, he is beaten by Mouth, only to be rescued by Guevara. In the anime, his name is "Ian McGregor" (イアン・マクレガー) in Japanese, and "Olam McGregor" in the English dub.

Chiharu Shiba
Voiced by: Tomohiro Nishimura

Chiharu Shiba (柴 千春, Shiba Chiharu) is the captain of the Gandamu (巌駄無) bōsōzoku motorcycle racing gang. Although an untrained street fighter, he possesses an extreme level of guts and willpower, which seems to allow him to be unable to feel pain. Chiharu fights Kohei Hatanaka in round one, where his arm is quickly broken. He then proceeds to severely break it even further as a form of intimidation, before beating Hatanaka. In round two, he fights Iron Michael and wins by breaking both of Michael's hands with his skull. However, against his wishes, Chiharu is declared medically unable to continue and is replaced by Alexander Gallen. Later, he is struck in the throat by Jack Hammer and knocked out. He is last shown (still injured), riding with his gang. Shiba makes a surprise return in the third manga series. At the request of Kaoru Hanayama, Shiba is to be Baki's training partner for the upcoming fight with Yujiro. Kaoru says Shiba must be Baki's partner because Shiba is weak. Baki is reluctant to fight Shiba at first, but finds a reason of his own when Shiba keeps on attacking him at various times throughout the day.

Kohei Hatanaka
Voiced by: Daisuke Hirakawa

Kohei Hatanaka (畑中 公平, Hatanaka Kōhei) is an All-Japan judo practitioner who breaks Chiharu's left arm before being beaten senseless by him. He later fights Yujiro who destroys him again by using his own style of judo against him and throwing into the ground.

Kengo Misaki
Voiced by: Jin Yamanoi

Kengo Misaki (三崎 健吾, Misaki Kengo) is a Shorinji Kempo user who beats American professional wrestler Mike Quinn in round one with an armlock. In round two, his wrist and ankle are bitten into by Jack Hammer, before he is knocked out.

Richard Filth
Voiced by: Masayuki Nakata

Richard Filth (リチャード・フィルス) is an American bouncer who is undefeated in 2,000 fights. His style sees him intentionally take every attack thrown at him. Filth wears a tuxedo to the ring and Doppo Orochi complies by wearing a nice suit of his own. Doppo also imitates the bouncer's style in their fight, intentionally taking Filth's attacks. However, Doppo is forced to use a defensive stance before delivering the winning blow to defeat Filth. Filth later fights and loses to Yujiro after breaking his hand punching Yujiro in the head, and a groin kick that makes him fly away. In the English dub of the anime, his surname is changed to "Phyllis".

Roger Harlon

Roger Harlon (ロジャー・ハーロン) is an American Olympic wrestler who quickly loses to Goki Shibukawa in round one. He is also one of the many people Yujiro beats on his rampage by giving him a powerful belly-to-belly suplex. Harlon is shown to have much respect for Alexander Gallen.

Yu Amanai
Voiced by: Masaya Takatsuka

Yu Amanai (天内 悠) is Yujiro's apprentice, whom he met in America, where Amanai was serving as a bodyguard to the US president. Yujiro took him under his wing, and Amanai is able to enter the tournament after Yujiro incapacitates bare-nuckle Muay Thai fighter Jagatta Sherman. In contrast to Yujiro's style which is aggressive and based on rage, Amanai's style is based on love. He defeats shoot wrestler Minoru Yamamoto in the first round, before facing Doppo. After feeling as if he has won the fight, Amanai begs Doppo to concede and Tokugawa to declare him the winner for Doppo's safety. Yujiro then interupts Doppo's attack and nearly kills Amanai for displaying such "weakness". Doppo is ultimately allowed to advance in the tournament, as it is determined his attack would have won him the match.

Alexander Gallen
Voiced by: Eiji Yanagisawa

Alexander Gallen (アレクサンダー・ガーレン) is an extremely patriotic Greco-Roman wrestler from Russia, who is undefeated in 600 matches. He notably has not undergone any formal training, but possesses a natural talent for combat sports and immense size and strength. In order to prove his loyality to "Mother Russia", he requested his wrists be chained together, and single-handedly created a uranium mine in two years. Angered with Sergei Taktarov's failure in the tournament, Gallen replaces the injured Chiharu to prove the strength of the Russian people. He is beaten by Jack Hammer, who bites off two of his fingers and stabs his ribs into his heart. Gallen returns in the second manga, where he is nearly killed by the Russian convict Sikorsky. The character is based on Russian wrestler Alexander Karelin. In the Baki anime, his name is "Andreanov Garland" (アンドレアノフ・ガーランド) and is pronounced "Zeigan/Zargan" in the English dub.

== Baki characters ==
=== Dorian ===
Voiced by: Unshō Ishizuka (OVA), Banjō Ginga (ONA) (Japanese); Aaron LaPlante (English)

Dorian (ドリアン) is an American convict that escaped from Algardos prison after being hanged. In his youth, he was a Private in the United States Army shortly after World War II, and he was stationed in Japan where he presumably started learning martial arts. He became a practitioner of Chinese kenpo and learned from the same school, and reached the same rank of Sea King as Retsu, the first Western man in history to attain that title. Besides Chinese Kempo, he also knows a form of hypnosis to cloud his opponents' senses and allows Dorian to defeat them. He has memorable battles with Doppo Orochi and Kato where he nearly killed them. After being beaten by Doppo he is hospitalized where he escaped and goes to Doppo's house where he attacks him and blows part of Doppo's face off using a bomb located on his wrist. He is later defeated by Retsu and is mentally incapacitated, making him harmless. He is later seen, under the protection of Oliva, at the Chinese Tournament where he loses in the first match. He is briefly seen in the anime during the Maximum Tournament storyline, making a cameo as both the man who dug a cave overnight and the man who recommended Retsu for his title. Of all the five convicts, he is most notable for his use of a wide variety of tools in fights, such as flammable materials, lightweight wire, and even covering his knuckles in broken glass.

=== Hector Doyle ===
Voiced by: Wataru Hatano (OVA), Takehito Koyasu (ONA) (Japanese); Johnny Yong Bosch (English)

Hector Doyle (ヘクター・ドイル) is a British convict who escaped after surviving his execution on the electric chair. While not clearly stated, he was probably a soldier in the British Armed Forces since in Britain the death penalty only exists for treason and military law, and he had a soldier acquaintance who helped his escape to Japan. He attacked and severely injured Rob Robinson and later scares Baki at school, although they don't actually fight. He has fought with Biscuit Oliva, Shinogi, Katsumi Orochi, Retsu and later Doppo after Doyle used explosives to detonate the floor of the Shinshinkai dojo. After being stabbed in the eye by Retsu, he later befriends Katsumi and plans on escaping the country on a ship. Yanagi comes and nearly kills Doyle and blinds him before Doyle escapes. Doyle is later seen in a cave where Oliva finds and captures him. His fate remains unknown. He fights using metal blades implanted into his joints and controlled by his nervous system. He also has a generator where his heart is which boosts his strength. As a side note, he is presumed to be Scottish since he referred Ardbeg Scotch as being "a drink from my home country" during his conversation with Retsu.

=== Sikorsky ===
Voiced by: Daisuke Ono (OVA), Kenjiro Tsuda (ONA) (Japanese); Grant George (English)

Sikorsky (シコルスキー) is a Russian convict who escaped from Evans prison in Russia. To do this he had to climb up the smooth surface of a missile silo since the prison was converted from an old ICBM base. After escaping, he nearly killed Alexander Gallen. He fights with Baki, Oliva, and Jack Hammer and even teams up with Yanagi to try to defeat Baki. He is defeated by Gaia in the Maximum Tournament arena. Gaia uses his environmental battle method to beat up and terrorize Sikorsky, and forces him to surrender and admit his defeat. His fate afterward is unknown. Although it does not say if Sikorsky has a particular martial art, it seems he uses just strength and has extremely powerful fingers, capable of carving into his opponent's flesh with his raised knuckles.

=== Spec ===
Voiced by: Atsushi Imaruoka (OVA), Chafurin (ONA) (Japanese); Kyle Hebert (English)

Spec (スペック) is an American convict who escaped from a Florida state prison, located 200 feet underwater in a giant submarine. Spec kills the councilor, who came to see him in prison, before escaping and killing five more guards on the shore. After wanting to fight Baki he is arrested. Instead of yielding to the law, he decides to make the Japanese detention center his second home. Spec has quite possibly the bloodiest battle in the series with Hanayama Kaoru where they both inflict severe injuries on each other. He threw bullets into Hanayama's mouth and forced his jaw shut, setting them off and blowing two large holes in his face. Spec has his throat ripped out after their second fight, which ultimately kills him. He knows a technique called "The Apnea Rush" where he throws a hundred rapid punches, without breathing, that destroys an opponent by melting their bones. Spec used it to heavily damage the Statue of Liberty which was almost destroyed. After his defeat, he aged rapidly and it is found out he is actually 97 years old. This character is based on the real life serial killer Andrei Chikatilo and Richard Speck.

=== Ryukoh Yanagi ===
Voiced by: Hisao Egawa (OVA), Issei Futamata (ONA) (Japanese); Chris Edgerly (English)

Ryukoh Yanagi (柳 龍光) is a Japanese convict who escapes from being enclosed in rocket-proof special glass. The smallest of the convicts physically, he is later being shown as the most deadly. He is the only convict whose crime is known, that he killed a dozen men in prison as a test bed for his new skill. He uses a special martial art called Way of the Void. In this style, he practices Vacuum Palm, Whip of Mercury, Poison Hand and many others. He is seen to be an old acquaintance of Goki Shibukawa. He has fought with Shibukawa, Baki, Doyle and Izo Motobe. He is responsible for poisoning Baki with his Poison Hand technique and also for nearly killing Doyle and for destroying Shibukawa's eye preceding the storyline. He fights with Izo who uses kenjutsu to stab his leg and cut off his Poison Hand. Yujiro then comes and declared Yanagi the loser which Yanagi did not accept. As Yujiro was ready to leave he quickly spins and smashes Yanagi's face with a backhand, nearly killing him, and leaving the left side of his face disfigured. Yanagi's defeat ended the Escaped Convicts saga.

=== Morio Sonoda ===
Voiced by: John Eric Bentley (English)

Morio Sonoda (園田 盛男) is the Japanese inspector in charge of the escaped convicts. After the failure of the special forces of police, he hires Oliva to finish the job. He respects the grapplers fighting the convicts, since they do a better job than the police. However, he doesn't understand how powerful the fighters actually are.

=== Michael Holes ===
Michael Holes (マイケル・ホールズ) is the warden of The Arizona Prison. He arranged a fight between Iron Michael and "The Mouth", to ensure that Michael could not restart his boxing career.

=== Biscuit Oliva ===
Voiced by: Yusaku Yara (OVA), Hochu Otsuka (ONA) (Japanese); James C. Mathis III (English)

Biscuit Oliva (ビスケット・オリバ) is an assassin working for the US government as well as being a special jailer in the Arizona State Prison. He possesses an iron body and is almost invulnerable to anything. He and Yujiro crossed paths while he was sent to assassinate a drug cartel leader. At the same time, he ran into Yujiro. He refers to Yujiro as "Mr. Ogre" and tends to be polite and eccentric before fighting. Yujiro mentions to him that he should take time with his kills rather than being quick about it. Oly understands Yujiro's bloodlust but prefers to do his job than play around. His trademark is his punch which can go through his opponent's heart. Is brought in by the US government to track down and capture the escaped convicts in the Search For Our Strongest Hero manga series. He has just defeated "Che Guevara" in the Arizona Prison and was recently defeated by Baki Hanma in a brute force showdown. He doesn't seem to practice any form of martial arts, instead using his freakish strength and resilience to overcome threats. His various feats of strength and muscle control seen in the manga are doing an exercise in which he repeatedly pulls a Chinook helicopter towards the ground, withstanding multiple shotgun blasts and then squeezing out the shot by flexing, breaking through iron doors with ease in the Arizona prison (in one case by turning a locked handle until the metal twists and ruptures around it), and flinging the convict Hector Doyle by one ankle into the floor with such force that the entire building they are in shakes. He also has one bizarre technique in which he curls into a perfect sphere of muscle in which he is impervious to attacks, but can uncurl and seize his opponents, 'eating' them "like Pac-Man". He then crushes them with his muscles. He uses this on Baki, but fails the second time he tries to use it. He is then beaten unconscious, if briefly, by Baki when they abandon the use of techniques and simply pound each other with all their might without dodging or blocking. His appearance and name are based on former Mr. Universe and three-time Mr. Olympia Sergio Oliva.

=== Jeff Markson ===
Jeff Markson (ジェフ・マークソン) is a former NYPD cop, who used to threaten and extort from hippies, as a "secret side job". As a result of his corruption, Oliva was sent to hunt him down. Markson encountered Oliva while he was doing his usual side job, and Oliva destroyed every part of his body, "barely within a limit of not killing a human" according to Markson, leaving him in a hideously disfigured shape. Since then, Markson lived only thinking of avenging Oliva. 24 years later, he attacked and took control of a business building after setting a bomb, taking two dozen hostages. He demanded Oliva to face him in exchange of the life of the hostages, to which Oliva happily complied. He welcomed Oliva with several blasts of shotgun, but the bullet was stopped by Oliva's muscle. Markson then drew out a Japanese sword and attacked him, but again it had no effect on him. Oliva, disappointed by Markson's powerless attack, gave a punch into Markson's chest. The punch crushed his heart, killing him instantly and the force of the punch blasted Markson's body out of the building's window.

=== Master Kunimatsu ===
Master Kunimatsu (マスター国松) is Ryukoh Yanagi's sensei. He appears to be about Tokugawa's age, being very thin and old. His left arm is missing and he later divulges to Tokugawa that he had his left arm removed to prevent Yanagi from killing him with his poison hand technique. Yanagi keeps his teacher's rotten arm on display. Kunimatsu's dojo roster features students from across the globe, but none from Japan (Yanagi being the one exception).

=== Mohammad Alai ===
Mohammad Alai (マホメド・アライ) is a legendary boxer who dedicated his life in fighting for the weak and developing a perfect art of fighting. When he was still young, he encountered a young Yujirô with whom he had a fight, to see how his art of fighting is developed. Yujirô gained the upper hand, and the two legends have since kept a friendly relationship. He became catatonic after his son defeated him soundly, 5 years before the events of Baki. However, he finally retrieves his punch and starts training again, explaining his reason for doing so during an interview. He saved the life of his son during his fight with Baki, by punching him before he killed Alai Jr. He left his son crying after his defeat.

=== Mohammad Alai Jr. ===
Mohammad Alai Jr. (マホメド・アライJr.) is the son of the famous boxer Mohammad Alai. He possesses some of the fastest reflexes and has destructive power in his punches. He participated in the Chinese tournament alongside the Japanese/American team. During the tournament he showcased his amazing abilities as a fighter. He claims to have perfected a martial art that only involves punches. After the tournament he challenged Baki's friends to provoke Baki himself. He easily defeated Goki in match (Goki didn't take it as a life or death fight) and slightly struggled against Doppo Orochi (he wasn't taking Alai seriously, and Alai dominated in their match), but is then beaten senseless by Jack Hammer who never really shows mercy in any fights unlike Doppo and Goki. He is then seriously injured and totally defeated by Doppo and Goki in fights in which they do not hold back against Alai Jr. Despite this, he still challenges Baki to a fight in the Korakuen Underground arena, believing that his strength and style is better. However he has one major weakness: unlike every other fighter who has faced Baki, he was not prepared to face the possibility of his own death in the fight, which goes back to his losses against Goki and Doppo in the second matches he had against them. He loses to Baki without landing a single hit, and Baki almost kills him before Alai Sr. jumps into the ring and stops him.

=== Kaiou Ryuu ===
Voiced by: Mitsuru Ogata (OVA), Shozo Iizuka (ONA) (Japanese)

Kaiou Ryuu (劉 海王, Ryū Kaiō) is an aged warrior, though not as old as Kaku. Ryu challenged his students to reach the Sea King rank, but was disappointed by failure. He's encountered by Retsu Shaolong (having not yet achieved Sea King). Disillusioned with Retsu's past misdeeds, Ryu had no intention of letting Retsu become Sea King. However, Dorian recommended making Retsu a Sea King. Ryu obliged, stating that Dorian could never be mistaken. He is apparently 100 years old and has retained a massively muscled physique. He battles Yujiro in the Raitai's first battle, and loses badly. He fails to land a single hit, and has his face ripped off. He is able to stand and attack again despite this injury, but Yujiro dodges and kicks him square in the face again, taking him out for good. Retsu later learned that his master is still alive.

=== Kaiou Kaku ===
Kaiou Kaku (郭 海皇) is the Sea Emperor of the Sea Kings in Retsu's system of Chinese fist fighting, and current champion of the Raitai (the Chinese tournament of Sea Kings against Sea Kings), he is roughly 146 years old when first seen in the manga. He is a shrunken old man, even shorter than Baki, who is almost skeletally thin, has a severely receding hairline, and a fantastically wrinkled face, who requires glasses and gets around in a wheelchair when not fighting. Despite his advanced age, however, he is a phenomenally lethal and skilled fighter with an almost sociopathic ruthlessness and pride in Chinese fighting and culture, viewing all others in contempt. His skills, the result of over a century of training in Chinese martial arts, allow him to easily defeat a Muay Thai-using Sea King, who is a fifth his age, in less than ten seconds without sustaining injury. He can slice several human limbs off with a simple chop of his hand, and even injure and send flying Yujiro himself. Kaku's primary technique is called 'Shao-li' or hyposthenia punch, a form of bodily control that allows him to present zero resistance to oncoming blows. He absorbs the impact of attacks so perfectly that even Yujiro's punches at full force only give him a slightly bloody nose. This also allows him to put his entire body weight into his blows, along with the force of his opponent's own attacks. This allows his withered fists to blast craters in stone walls and injure Yujiro. It is Kaku who disrupts the structure of the Chinese tournament, turning it into a 'Chinese team vs Japanese/American team' match-up when the majority of other Sea Kings at the tournament prove disappointing and are easily defeated by Baki and his friends. He ends up battling Yujiro Hanma, and is shown to be one of the opponents that Yujiro respects. The match ends in a draw, and Kaku bestows the title of Sea King on Yujiro after the fight as well as a challenge to battle again in another hundred years. He surprisingly reappears in Baki: Son of Ogre, to help Katsumi in the fusion between the 500 years in karate and the 4000 years of Chinese martial arts.

=== Kaiou Jyaku ===
Kaiou Jyaku (寂 海王) is a bald Sea King with beard and glasses, and uses a fighting style which focuses on not harming the adversary. He joined the Stranger Team when the Raitai had his rules changed by Kaku, and was defeated by Retsu during a long fight, in which Jaku focused on defense and managed to take many hits without being so harmed. In the end, Retsu hits his vertebral column, and takes him down with one punch in the face, despite this, Jaku remains standing even when unconscious, which leads Retsu to declare him the victor. He reappears in Baki: Son of Ogre, in the military base, searching to fight Pickle. He also has a tendency to ask other fighters to return to Japan with him.

=== Kaiou Han ===
Kaiou Han (範 海王) is the brother of Li and part of the Chinese team, he fights Alai Jr. and gets his face slashed before being defeated in one hit.

=== Kaiou Ri ===
Kaiou Ri (李 海王) is the brother of Han and master of poisons, like Yanagi. He fights the poisoned Baki in the Raitai and manages indirectly to "heal" him with his poisoned hands, as a counter effect. He is then knocked out in two hits.

=== Kaiou Samwan ===
Kaiou Samwan (サムワン 海王) is a Thai-born Muay Thai user, who is 25 at the time of the Raitai tournament. He had apparently been spotted and trained by another former Sea King while playing with a live cobra in the streets. While his Muay Thai skills were impressive enough for him to be granted the title of Sea King in China and qualify for the Raitai, they aren't nearly enough against Kaku, who pulls off his pants and flicks his testicles, paralysing him with pain and defeating him in a profoundly humiliating manner. He later attempts to take out some of his anger and frustration on Yujiro, an ill-advised move that ends with his head smashed into the floor. He has little respect or even belief in the more philosophical or mystic side of martial arts, believing that "whoever uses his body better, wins". This is what leads to his downfall against the more logical or intellectual style of Kaku. Samwon, or a character who resembles him, is briefly seen in the Underground Tournament arc of the anime as a champion of Muay Thai. He tries to fight Yujiro, who labels him as a hollow champion. Samwon launches a fierce attack, but his blows are blocked only by Yujiro's finger. Yujiro knocks him out with a flick on the forehead.

=== Kaiou You ===
Kaiou You (楊 海王) is a Sea King specifically trained into having a "diamond body" (by a harsh training where he is hit by sticks, cars, torrents, rocks). He defeats Dorian and then tests his body against Oliva's strength, but he is crushed by one hand.

=== Kaiou Jo ===
Kaiou Jo (徐 海王) is a tall Sea King who fights again Alai Jr, he is rapidly defeated after not even landing a single hit.

=== Kaiou Son ===
Kaiou Son (孫 海王) ia a Sea King focusing on a style with fingers, he is defeated in an arm wrestling match (or finger wrestling match) against Retsu.

=== Kaiou Chin ===
Kaiou Chin (陳 海王) is a Sea King who fights Jaku and is distracted by his kindly nature, and is then beaten by having his arm twisted on the ground.

=== Kaiou Mou ===
Kaiou Mou (毛 海王) is a fat Sea King who doesn't fight all because he is knocked out by Kaku with one finger in the chin, because Kaku changed the rules of the Raitai in the Chinese vs Stranger team.

=== Shobun Ron ===
Shobun Ron (龍書文) is a user of Yami Kenpou (dark arts), an unbeaten fighter of the Chinese underground area hired by Kaku Sea King to make the Chinese team. He hardly speaks Japanese and is mainly silent. He fights Oliva and manages to wound him significantly with his Kiai (hidden stance) which focuses on a "pocket trick", mainly letting both hands in the pockets and then attacking (like a sword stance). However Oliva blocks him and defeats him with powerful headbutts.

=== Shunsei Kaku ===
Shunsei Kaku (郭春成), nicknamed "crazy beast", he was conceived when Kaku was 125 years old (He's his youngest son, 27 years old). He gets KO by Baki before even landing a single hit.

== Baki Hanma characters ==
=== Saman ===
Voiced by: Tesshō Genda (ONA)

Saman (サマン) is a leader of a special task force in Africa. He gathered many troops together to kill a raging elephant. The elephant was ten or more times bigger than a normal elephant. It was big enough to impale a lion with its tusks. Saman's weapons could not defeat it, and neither could anti-aircraft weapons. Yujiro came and killed the elephant without a weapon. Saman relayed this story to the news, only to be ridiculed.

=== Rumina Ayukawa ===
Rumina Ayukawa (鮎川ルミナ) is a grade-schooler who challenged Baki to become the strongest. Baki slapped him. Afterwards, Rumina was complimented for taking a blow. Baki then took Rumina to his home and demonstrated his shadow boxing.

=== Jun Guevaru ===
Jun Guevaru (純・ゲバル) is a former pirate of the high seas who went on to found his own sovereign nation of 'La Serna'. His appearance is nearly identical to the real Guevara as seen in the classic photograph, and he is one of the three strongest men in the entire world, along with Biscuit Oliva (the second) and Yujiro Hanma (the first). Much like the real-life version, this manga version of Guevara is notorious for his radical political philosophy, his anti-captitalist and more specifically anti-US stance (the crime he is presumably imprisoned for is that he broke into George W. Bush's house and threatened his family, after Bush considered using bullying military tactics against La Serna despite the warnings of his advisors), and his harsh discipline. It is this discipline that has made him so powerful, as he is described as 'one of the three men alive more powerful than a machine gun'. He uses a fighting style developed from the exclusive use of bare hands against all weapon types, and so is quite capable of killing someone in a single hit. He can defeat an opponent who has a gun to his head, or destroy several abnormally strong and/or skilled opponents at once. He is first encountered in the Arizona prison, as he has intentionally allowed himself to be captured and imprisoned there in order to battle Biscuit Oliva, a man he sees as representing the strength and arrogance of the United States. He puts up a good fight against Oliva, but loses in the end after enduring several hits from Oliva's full strength, Oliva noting that he is the first man in ages to be able to withstand his full strength. Apart from these obvious differences in personality and ability, this manga version of Guevara is also much younger than the real-life version would be, being about mid-thirties at the oldest, with the manga being set in current times. He goes back to his country after his defeat.

=== Chamomile Lessen ===
Voiced by: Kensho Ono (ONA) (Japanese); Israel Adesanya (English)

Chamomile Lessen (カモミール・レッセン) is one of Guevara's underlings. He infiltrated the secret service as a bodyguard of President Bush. While Bush was having a conference about military action in La Serna, Chamomile stopped him and informed him that Guevara's men have infiltrated every state.

=== Mouth ===
Mouth (マウス（口）) are a group of identical triplets, Lips (唇（リップ）), Teeth (歯（トゥース）) and Tongue (舌（タング), who have a knack for finishing each other's sentences. They are formidable soldiers sent to fight Iron Michael to ensure that he can't start his boxing career again. Fighting all at once, they beat Ian nearly to death, but Jun stops them. Jun urinated on Tongue, who unleashed much profanity before being beaten by Guevara. With a core member defeated, Lips and Teeth knew they could not win and retreated, to which Guevara casually said, "As usual, the Tongue was the only one who got dirty".

=== Maria ===
Maria (マリア) is a morbidly obese woman and the lover of Biscuit Oliva. Oliva is stunned by her beauty, so much that he says that a handkerchief from her hometown has the most intense scent. However, Maria constantly belittles and insults Oliva. She watches the Guevara/Oliva fight from atop her king-sized bed. It is later revealed she was once a slim and incredibly attractive woman, but an unknown disease and the drugs used to treat it caused her massive weight gain, possibly affecting her metabolism. Oliva continues to love her because her attitude and bearing never changed despite her hardship.

=== Pickle ===
Voiced by: Takeshi Kusao (ONA)

Pickle (ピクル) is a primitive form of man found perfectly preserved in a saline rock formation (hence he is 'pickled') this giant humanoid supposed lived originally in the Jurassic/Cretaceous era. He is revived from his long suspended animation in Baki 10.5, and is sent to Japan by Strydom after he defeats entire army battalions and even a high-tech exo-skeletal powersuit sent against him. Pickle does not resemble any form of primitive man (Neanderthal or Cro-Magnon) or even modern humans, standing taller than Jack Hammer and possessing a level of muscular development equivalent to Oliva, this has led some to believe Pickle is a missing link in the evolutionary chain. He possesses upper and lower exaggerated canines, giving him a 'fanged' appearance, and his nails resemble claws. His muscles are so developed and powerful that he withstands three 9 mm. shots to the stomach at point blank range, none of which penetrate his abs, and indeed he believes the man who shot him to be engaging in some sort of rough-house 'game'. He hunted, killed and ate T-Rexes without the use of weapons in his prehistoric life, and is one of the most blatantly superhuman characters in the entire manga. He has never been heard to speak intelligibly so far in the manga. His strength is shown in various occasions, being capable of withstanding a strength test with Yujiro himself, resisting a charge from Hanayama, sending Baki flying through the Korakuen arena with a single kick, chopping a leg from Retsu after beating him, and enduring Katsumi Orochi's attacks and taking his right arm, then praying over the severed limb to show his reverence and respect for Katsumi. When fighting Jack Hammer he lost his left ear to a bite attack after ripping off the flesh from Jack's jaw. He goes mad after this and beats Jack senseless. In Baki's battle against Pickle, Baki's adaption of dinosaur-like stances has led Pickle into believing that he's as dangerous as the giant dinosaurs that he used to fight against. He defeated Baki with a shoulder throw and began to roam the city freely, eventually interrupting Baki and Yujiro's fight in order to ask Baki for a rematch. Baki then kicked him with a roundhouse and stunned him, forcing him to sit and watch the fight from the sidelines. As time has gone on, Pickle has somewhat adjusted to civilization (i.e. wearing clothes and only killing animals that present a danger to others), though he prefers living alone in the sewers to living with other people.

=== Dr. Albert Payne ===
Dr. Albert Payne (アルバート・ペイン) is a nobel prize winner. He appears to be very knowledgeable about Pickle, whom he views as a treasure to the human race. Thus he harshly rebukes anyone who tries to defame Pickle, saying that his acts (i.e., sexually assaulting a female reporter, killing and eating an endangered tiger) are only natural to him in his time and thus is not wrong. He is based on Albert Einstein.
