= Kayoko Fujii =

Japanese actress and voice actress

Kayoko Fujii (藤井 佳代子, Fujii Kayoko, born April 21, 1961) is a Japanese actress and voice actress who is affiliated with Seinenza Theater Company.

== Performances ==
=== Filmography ===
1984

- Heavy Metal L-Gaim (Pamela Piloledge)
- Mīmu Iro Iro Yume no Tabi
- Urusei Yatsura

1985

- Mobile Suit Zeta Gundam (Rosamia Badam)

1986

- Animated Classics of Japanese Literature
- Dirty Pair: Project Eden (Secretary)
- Mobile Suit Gundam ZZ (Emary Ounce)
- Uchūsen Sagittarius

1987

- Grimm's Fairy Tale Classics (Snow White)
- Metal Armor Dragonar (Linda Plato)

1988

- Mashin Hero Wataru (Seiryuu-hime)
- Ronin Warriors (Kayura's mother)

1989

- Jushin Liger (Saeko Yagami)
- Madō King Granzort (Bus Guide)
- Mobile Suit Gundam 0080: War in the Pocket (Caster)

1990

- Mashin Hero Wataru 2 (Seiryuu-hime)

1991

- The Brave Fighter of Sun Fighbird

1992

- Jeanie with the Light Brown Hair (Linda)

1993

- Little Women II: Jo's Boys (Mary-Ann)
- The Wind in the Willows

1994

- Huckleberry Finn Monogatari (Sophia)
- Tico of the Seven Seas

1995

- Juu Senshi Garukiba (Melody; Miru Kamijou)
- Romeo's Blue Skies (Jessica)

1996

- Detective Conan (Kana Misaki)
- The Life and Adventures of Santa Claus

1997

- Detective Conan: The Time Bombed Skyscraper (Kana Misaki)
- Chūka Ichiban!

=== Game roles ===
- Another Century's Episode (Linda Plato)
- Final Fantasy X (Belgemine)
- Super Robot Wars series (Rosamia Badam, Emary Ounce)

=== Dubbing ===
- Backdraft
- Charmed (Patty Halliwell)
- Crazy Like a Fox
- Dae Jang Geum
- Diagnosis: Murder
- Henry Fool (Fay Grim)
- Nash Bridges
- The Mothman Prophecies
- What I Like About You (Lauren)
