= Another Century's Episode 2 =

2006 video game

- Developer: From Software
- Publisher: Banpresto
- Director: Tomohiro Shibuya
- Designer: Yui Tanimura
- Programmer: Yoshitaka Suzuki
- Writers: Kazuki Yamanobe; Yasuyuki Mochida
- Platform: PlayStation 2
- Release: JP: March 30, 2006
- Genre: Action
- Modes: Single-player, multiplayer

Another Century's Episode 2 (アナザーセンチュリーズエピソード 2, Anazā Senchurīzu Episōdo Tsu), abbreviated as A.C.E. 2, is a third-person mecha action video game produced by Banpresto and developed by From Software. It is the sequel to the popular 2005 game Another Century's Episode. It was released for the PlayStation 2 on March 30, 2006.

On November 29, 2007, Banpresto released A.C.E. 2 Special Vocal Edition as a follow-up to the heels of A.C.E. 2's sequel, Another Century's Episode 3: The Final. This version includes vocal theme songs for each of the featured animated series in the game.

== Plot ==
A.C.E.2 is not a direct sequel to its predecessor, as it involves its own original plot, as well as covering events that already happened in A.C.E., albeit differently. This is not an unusual occurrence, as Banpresto has done this with most entries in the Super Robot Wars franchise; most of the games in that series are not connected by an established continuity (exceptions include the Super Robot Wars Alpha games and the titles in the Super Robot Wars classic timeline), with remakes or updates abounding.

However, there are some links back to A.C.E. in the sequel. The Ark series, including the main character's Gunark, use as their power source the super-volatile substance E2, which was introduced in the first game. Additionally, most of the A.C.E. original enemies return, this time with a backstory, while in A.C.E. they were simply there to add to the challenge.

== System changes ==
- Faster Combat: A.C.E. 2 delivers and portrays high-speed mecha combat better than its predecessor.
- Pilot Cut-Ins: The game will feature the pilots in both 2D and cel-shaded 3D forms, while in A.C.E. their only presence was in sound bites played while launching and during certain battles.
- More Weapons: Each unit can also have up to seven weapons, which can be set by the player; this allows the player to separate the units primary ranged weapon and melee weapon, unlike the previous game.
- Improved Support: While A.C.E. allowed the player to have other units support him/her during a stage, their presence was limited to occasional voice clips. A.C.E. 2 will have the other units actually appear during the stage as computer-controlled allies.
- Combination Attacks: The player will be able to perform special combination attacks where their team members combine their skills with incredibly devastating (and cinematic) results. Certain combinations of characters will result in team-ups from the anime involved, such as Brain Powerd's Chakra Extension and Nadesico's Double Gekigan Flare. Some combinations of characters (such as the major characters from Macross and Endless Waltz) get new combinations. If the player uses three unrelated characters for a combination attack, they simply perform a generic all-out attack.
- Favorites System: Much like recent entries into the Super Robot Wars series (specifically MX and J), A.C.E. 2 features a system by which the player can designate one of the featured series as their favorite. The units from the favored series may be upgraded more than they would normally, potentially making them the strongest units in that player's game.

== Control types ==
Like the previous game in the series, A.C.E. 2 features two different set-ups for the controller: shift and select type. However, unlike A.C.E., neither of these set-ups will be a "simple mode" for first-time players. Instead, the two different set-ups will simply represent different ways of using the many weapons available to the player.

=== Flight controls ===
The player can also choose to modify the controls for plane-type units, such as the Re-GZ, the Valkyrie's Fighter Mode and the transformations of machines like Layzner MK II and L-Gaim MK II. Flight Mode is the standard control system, where the player controls roll and pitch with the Left Analogue Stick, and can bank with the L1 and R1 buttons. Easy Mode has the analogue stick control both roll and pitch. Flight Reverse Mode reverses the natural set-up for altitude, so that tilting the analogue Stick down causes the machine to dive, while holding it up makes the machine climb.

== Featured series ==
Six of the series from A.C.E. return in A.C.E. 2, joined by five new ones (although one of the new series, Endless Waltz, is the sequel to one of the series that did not return from A.C.E. and Gundam Wing). Additionally, three EX Series are included, although their involvement in the game's story is not as significant as the other series (excluding Wings of Rean, which is announced to join the series in later promotion video, and have its ONA released after the game). A grand total of 106 playable mecha from the fourteen anime represented, as well as the originals, are playable.

In addition to the fourteen series, A.C.E. 2 includes new original characters and mecha, designed by Takuya Saito and Junya Ishigaki, respectively. The heroes of the game are Tak Kepford (voiced by Daisuke Kishio) and Marina Carson (voiced by Naomi Shindou), and they pilot transforming mecha called Gun Arks.

- Mobile Suit Gundam: Char's Counterattack
  - Playable Mecha
    - RX-93 Nu Gundam (pilot: Amuro Ray)
    - RGZ-91 RE-GZ (pilot: Amuro Ray)
- Aura Battler Dunbine
  - Playable Mechas
    - Billbine (pilot: Sho Zama)
    - Dunbine (pilot: Marvel Frozen)
  - Non-Playable Mechas
    - Leprechaun (pilot: Jerryl Coochibi)
    - Wryneck (pilot: Todd Guinness)
    - Zwarth (pilot: Black Knight a.k.a. Bern Burnings)
    - Galava (pilot: Black Knight)
- Blue Comet SPT Layzner
  - Layzner (pilot: Eiji Asuka)
  - New Layzner (pilot Eiji Asuka)
  - Layzner Mk-II (pilot Eiji Asuka)
- Brain Powerd
  - Nelly Brain (pilot: Yuu Isami)
  - Hime Brain (pilot: Hime Utsumiya)
  - Yuu Brain (pilot: Yuu Isami)
  - Quincy Baronz (pilot: Quincy Issa)
- Metal Armor Dragonar
  - XDFU Dragonar-1 Lifter (pilot: Kaine Wakaba)
  - XD-01SR Dragonar-1 Lifter (pilot: Kaine Wakaba)
  - XD-01SR Dragonar-1 Custom (pilot: Kaine Wakaba)
  - XDFU-02 Dragonar-2 Lifter (pilot: Tapp Oceano)
  - XD-02SR Dragonar-2 Custom (pilot: Tapp Oceano)
  - XDFU-03 Dragonar-3 Lifter (pilot: Light Newman)
  - XDFU-03 Enhanced Dragonar Lifter-3 (pilot: Light Newman)
  - MAFFU-09 Falguen MAFFU (pilot: Meio Plato)
- Heavy Metal L-Gaim
  - L-Gaim (pilot: Daba Mylord)
  - Novel D.Sserd (pilot: Gaw Ha Leccee)
  - Batshuu
- The Super Dimension Fortress Macross
  - VF-1 Valkyrie (pilot: Hikaru Ichijyo)
  - VF-1J Armored Valkyrie (pilot: Hikaru Ichijyo)
  - SDF-1 Macross
- Macross: Do You Remember Love?
  - VF-1S Strike Valkyrie (pilot: Roy Focker)
  - VF-1A Valkyrie (pilot: Maximillion Jenius)
  - Queadluun-Rau (pilot: Millian Jenius)
- Martian Successor Nadesico
  - Aestivalis (pilot: Akito Tenkawa)
  - Aestivalis Custom (pilots: Ryoko Subaru, Izumi Maki, Hikaru Amano, Nagare Akatsuki)
  - Nadesico
- Mobile Suit Gundam 0083: Stardust Memory
  - RX-78GP01 Gundam "Zephyranthes" (pilot: Kou Uraki)
  - RX-78GP01Fb Gundam Full Vernian "Zephyranthes" (pilot: Kou Uraki)
  - RX-78GP02A Gundam "Physalis" (pilot: Anavel Gato)
  - RX-78GP03 Gundam "Dendrobium Orchis" (pilot: Kou Uraki)
  - AMA-002 Neue Ziel (pilot: Anavel Gato)
- Mobile Fighter G Gundam
  - GF13-017NJII God Gundam (pilot: Domon Kasshu)
- Gundam Wing: Endless Waltz
  - XXXG-00W0 Wing Gundam Zero (pilot: Heero Yui)
  - XXXG-01D2 Gundam Deathscythe Hell (pilot: Duo Maxwell)
  - XXXG-01H Gundam Heavyarms (pilot: Trowa Barton)
  - XXXG-01SR Gundam Sandrock (pilot: Quatre Rabera Winner)
  - XXXG-01S2 Altron Gundam (pilot: Chang Wufei)
  - OZ-00MS2B Tallgeese III (pilot: Milliardo Peacecraft)
- Martian Successor Nadesico: The Motion Picture – Prince of Darkness
  - Black Selena (pilot: Akito Tenkawa)
  - Aestivalis Custom (pilot: Ryoko Subaru)
  - Alstroemeria (pilot: Genichiro Tsukiomi)
  - Yatenkou (pilot: Hokushin)
- The Wings of Rean
  - Nanajin (pilot: Asap Suzuki)
  - Aka-Nanajin (pilot: Asap Suzuki)
  - Oukaou (pilot: Shinjiro Sakomizu)

== Music ==
The game's opening theme is "Glorious" by Rina Aiuchi; its ending theme, also performed by Aiuchi, is "Precious Place".

A.C.E. 2 follows the musical style of its predecessor, using remixes of themes from the featured anime along with several new songs composed for the game. However, A.C.E. 2 uses much more faithful remixes of the songs borrowed from anime, while A.C.E. used more rock and roll-styled remixes.

The theme songs for each series are:

- Aura Battler Dunbine - "Dunbine Tobu, Senka no Tsume Ato"
- Blue Comet SPT Layzner - "Melos no Youni ~Lonely Way~"
- Brain Powerd - "In My Dream"
- Gundam Wing: Endless Waltz - "White Reflection"
- Heavy Metal L-Gaim - "Kaze no No Reply"
- Macross: Do You Remember Love? - "Do You Remember Love?"
  - Note: Through Macross's "Do You Remember Love?" appears in the vocal version as a plot of story, it is not selectable by player.
- Martian Successor Nadesico - "You Get to Burning, Go! Aestivalis!"
- Martian Successor Nadesico: The Motion Picture – Prince of Darkness - "Main Motif Nadesico"
- Metal Armor Dragonar - "Yume Iro Chaser"
- Mobile Suit Gundam 0083: Stardust Memory - "The Winner, Assault Waves, Rising Operation Stardust"
- Mobile Suit Gundam: Char's Counterattack - "Sally"
- Mobile Fighter G Gundam - "Flying in the Sky, Moeagare Toushi, Waga Kokoro Meikyo Shisui"
- The Super Dimension Fortress Macross - "Dog Fighter, Destined Battle"
- The Wings of Rean - "Wings of Rean BGM"

The August 2007 issue of Famitsu announced a special vocal version of A.C.E. 2, which will be released on November 29, 2007. Like its sequel, A.C.E. 3, the theme songs of each respective series will be replaced by their original vocal themes.

- Aura Battler Dunbine - "Dunbine Tobu"
- Blue Comet SPT Layzner - "Melos no Youni ~Lonely Way~"
- Brain Powerd - "In My Dream"
- Gundam Wing: Endless Waltz - "White Reflection"
- Heavy Metal L-Gaim - "Time for L-Gaim"
- Macross: Do You Remember Love? - "Do You Remember Love?"
- Metal Armor Dragonar - "Yume Iro Chaser"
- Mobile Fighter G Gundam - "Flying in the Sky"
- Mobile Suit Gundam 0083: Stardust Memory - "Men of Destiny"
