= Blue Comet SPT Layzner =

Japanese anime television series

- 蒼き流星SPTレイズナー
- Genre: Mecha, Science fiction (alien invasion)
- Created by: Hajime Yatate (Note: Concept); Ryōsuke Takahashi (Note: Story); Tsunehisa Itō
- Directed by: Ryōsuke Takahashi
- Music by: Hiroki Inui
- Country of origin: Japan
- Original language: Japanese
- No. of episodes: 38

Production
- Producers: Seiichi Ginya (NTV); Takahiko Kimoto (Yomiko); Masuo Ueda (Nippon Sunrise)
- Production company: Nippon Sunrise

Original release
- Network: NNS (NTV)
- Release: October 3, 1985 – June 26, 1986

Related
- Original video animation

Act I & Act II (Compilation episodes)
- Directed by: Ryōsuke Takahashi
- Produced by: Masuo Ueda; Takahiko Kimoto
- Written by: Tsunehisa Itō
- Music by: Hiroki Inui
- Studio: Nippon Sunrise
- Released: August 21, 1986 – September 21, 1986
- Runtime: 60 minutes (each)
- Episodes: 2
- Original video animation

Kokuin 2000 (Alternative ending)
- Directed by: Ryōsuke Takahashi
- Produced by: Masuo Ueda; Takahiko Kimoto
- Written by: Tsunehisa Itō
- Music by: Hiroki Inui
- Studio: Nippon Sunrise
- Licensed by: NA: Discotek Media
- Released: October 21, 1986
- Runtime: 56 minutes

Blue Comet SPT Layzner (蒼き流星SPTレイズナー, Aoki Ryūsei Esu Pī Tī Reizunā), sometimes translated as Blue Meteor SPT Layzner, is a science fiction anime series produced by Nippon Sunrise between 1985 and 1986. It was originally written by Tsunehisa Itō with Ryōsuke Takahashi as series' director.

The series focuses on an alien invasion and subsequent totalitarian world occupation and resistance in a timeline where the Cold War continues.

== Premise ==
The story takes place in the year 1996, where humanity is advanced enough to develop long-range space travel, as well as bases on both the Moon and Mars. However, Cold War tensions between the United States and the Soviet Union have not ended; rather, they have escalated as both sides continue to militarize space, and the shadow of nuclear conflict looms over humanity both on and off Earth.

Meanwhile, on Mars, an exchange program created by the United Nations to promote peace and understanding is about to begin; the "Cosmic Culture Club"—consisting of 16 members, as well as their instructor Elizabeth—arrives at the UN Mars base, and are being welcomed by the staff. Among the passengers is Anna—a 14-year-old girl who serves as the narrator for the story.

Suddenly, four unidentified humanoid robots classified as Super-Powered Tracers are detected, engaged in fierce combat with each other. The UN base is caught in the crossfire and quickly destroyed, eliminating all but six members of the "Cosmic Culture Club"—Elizabeth, Arthur, Roan, David, Simone, and Anna—leaving them stranded on the barren planet that has suddenly become a battlefield. As the battle ends, the lone SPT standing lands next to the terrified group and opens up revealing a pilot, who simply announces to them, "The Earth has been targeted".

The robots who destroyed the UN base were the creation of the Grados, an alien race, from the Udoria system, who came to the Sol system for conquest, seeing an easy victory as the two superpowers raged against each other to exhaustion—however, this could also be described as an act of pre-emptive self-defense; the Gradosian supercomputers have determined that humanity will eventually cease its in-fighting and become powerful enough to spread through the galaxy, feigning a deadly threat to even the far off Grados.

However, there were two Grados opposed to the plan: human astronaut Ken Asuka, assumed lost during a deep space mission but discovered by the Grados, and his son Null Albatro (his "human" name being Eiji). As the Grados prepared their invasion fleet, Eiji stows away on board one of the ships and steals their most powerful and advanced weapon, the SPT-LZ-00X Layzner, before fleeing, seeking to warn humanity of its impending invasion. It was here where he was attacked. Aside from the Layzner, the surviving humans have now become very important to the Grados; as the only human passersby to the aliens and their power, the six are the only ones who can convince each belligerent power to stand down from destroying one another, and focus on the greater threat.

== Cast ==
- Albatro Null Eiji Asuka (アルバトロ・ナル・エイジ・アスカ, Arubatoru Naru Eiji Asuka) (Kazuhiko Inoue): Eiji is a hybrid with a human astronaut for a father and a Gradosian noblewoman for a mother. He grew up as a low-ranking Gradosian SPT pilot on the Empire's homeworld. A pacifist by nature, he still decides to take a more direct hand when he learns of the invasion of Earth. Unfortunately, he is torn between his beliefs and his loyalties towards the comrades of his homeworld, many of whom he considers to be his kindred. This forces Eiji to go to extreme lengths to not kill his opponents, an ideal made vastly difficult by the amoral AI aboard the Layzner.
- Anna Stephanie (Hiroko Emori): The youngest member of the Cosmic Culture Club at age 14, she is a quiet and reserved girl who is highly intuitive and empathetic, allowing her to see the good nature inside of all people. This allows her to be the first to befriend and trust Eiji in spite of his Gradosian heritage.
- David Rutherford (Hideyuki Umezu): The American member of the CCC, David is reckless, emotional, and headstrong: making him a very hot-blooded 17-year-old. However, this also makes him unable to deal with loss and fear. At first, had an intense hatred and distrust of Eiji stemming from the fact that he blamed the rebel for the death of his best friend Juno during Grados' initial raid on the CCC. Eventually he 'warms up' to Eiji through many trials and trusts him enough to become his wingman with the SPT-BB-02U Babel.
- Roanne Demitrich (Katsumi Toriumi): Aged 15 years and a native of Switzerland, Roanne is a genius and is by far the most mature member of the group: often displaying calm, observant level-headedness usually attributed to people well beyond his years. Usually the strategist of the CCC, he was found constantly evaluating the situations they found themselves in determining the best possible solutions from whatever options they had. The best friend of Arthur Cummings Jr., his intelligent maturity quickly endeared him to Eiji as well. Also eventually acted as Eiji's second wingman with the SPT-BD-03U Baldy.
- Simone Reflann (Fumi Hirano): At 16, Simone is the daughter of aristocracy being born of wealthy French and English parents. Initially appearing to be stubborn, cynical, and selfish she was at first opposed to engaging in guerrilla warfare against the Gradosian Empire. However, she eventually developed romantic feelings for Eiji and these allowed her to assist the rest of the CCC against Grados.
- Arthur Cummings Jr. (Yuji Shikamata): Tied with David at 17 to be the oldest surviving member of the CCC, Arthur was well-liked among the CCC and a chief confidant of Roanne despite his tendencies of weakness, cowardice, and a weak will that made him prone to emotional outbursts and ramblings. Since he harbors a deep crush on Simone she uses this to her advantage in order to get him to do whatever he wants, exploiting his "eager to please" nature.
- Dr. Elizabeth Clabery (Keiko Toda): The 24-year-old adult instructor and mentor of the Cosmic Culture Club, her controlled level-headedness allowed her to calm the frightened children during the first attack of the Super-Powered Tracers. Her main goal was to help Eiji and the surviving CCC members escape to the Earth in an attempt to warn its major superpowers about the impending Gradosian invasion.
- Mill Julia Asuka Albatro (Mari Yokoo): The older sister of Eiji, she was engaged to his best friend Gale, and the two were to wed in a matter of months. Julia refused to listen to her parents' pleas to help Earth and ran away from her family's home to live with Gale.
- Le Caine (Kaneto Shiozawa): Admiral Gresco's son, introduced in the second arc, Eiji's rival, and the main villain of the series. Appointed to Supreme Commander of Earth, he is ruthless and arrogant, believing in the ethnic superiority of the Gradosians. Although he tries to execute Julia for treason, he finds himself unable as he is strangely attracted to her spiritual force. He is determined to rule Earth and crush all resistance, but refuses to fight unfairly since he considers himself nobility.
- 'Rei' (Eriko Hara): The AI aboard the SPT-LZ-00X Layzner, its intelligence was so advanced that it developed an actual personality of its own which was nicknamed "Rei" by Eiji. Despite having feminine characteristics and the nature of a sweet child, Rei had no notion of morality and would usually recommend destroying the cockpit of an enemy SPT-instantly killing its pilot-rather than disabling its limbs as she believes that this is the most effective way to defeat an enemy. Often, she would seize controls of the Layzner herself in order to protect Eiji and the SPT from damage.
- Gosterro (Masashi Hirose): A senior officer and ace pilot of the Gradosian militia who considered himself a rival of both Eiji & Gale. Once having romantic interests in Julia, she immediately rebuffed him. A sadistic psychopath, Gosterro delights in killing to the extent where his lust for blood overpowers all needs and reason, forcing him to take the lives of his own wingmen. Deeply wishing to kill Eiji, he personally takes the assignment of stopping the rebel with his own SPT-BG-91U Bullgrenn.
- 'Fouron' (Eriko Hara): A hidden, recessive program deep within the SPT-LZ-00X Layzner capable of overriding Rei, this AI had the persona of an adult male yet still kept the amorality of its predecessor. Programmed by Ken Asuka as a way of conveying information about Grados to the Earthlings, it would be surfaced whenever the Layzner was critically damaged, or Eiji was in serious danger of dying; its trademark purple eyes marking its complete control over the SPT, even its V-MAX system.
- Admiral Gresco (Takeshi Watabe): Leader of the Gradosian fleet that invades Earth. He dies after being hit by V-MAX.
- 2nd Lieutenant Karla Egiel (Run Sasaki): A Gradosian ace pilot who flew in Gale's squadron with her SPT-DM-20C Dimarge, she secretly harbored feelings for her leader despite his own feelings for Julia.
- Manjuro (Kozo Shioya):
- Getey (Masaharu Sato):
- Bohn (Koichi Hashimoto):
- Lieutenant Ahmos Gale (Hideyuki Hori): Gale isn't only Eiji's friend, but also his future brother-in-law after he is engaged to Julia. A senior officer of the Gradosian militia aged 25, he is assigned to track down and stop the "traitor" Eiji after he turns against his own squadron and seeks to warn the Earth of its impending invasion. He pilots the SPT-GK-10U Greimkaiser.
- Commander Gueler (Yūji Mitsuya):
- Mash (Kazue Ikura):

== Media ==
=== Anime ===
Blue Comet ran for 38 episodes from October 3, 1985, to June 26, 1986. Episode 25 is a recap clip-show and episode 38 is replaced by the 3rd OVA, subtitled The Last Act: Re-recording 2000 (LAST ACT 刻印2000, Rasuto Akuto Kokuin Nisen), that remakes and expands on its events to conclude the show after it was canceled with only 2/3rd of the plot concluded. The first 2 OVAs, subtitled Act I: Eiji 1996 (ACT-1 エイジ1996, Akuto Wan Eiji Sen Kyūhyaku Kyūjū Roku) and Act II: Le Caine 1999 (ACT-2 ル･カイン1999, Akuto Tsū Ru Kain Sen Kyūhyaku Kyūjū Kyū), summarize episodes 1–24 (Act I) and 26–37 (Act II).

BC was known to have aired in Japan via AT-X, BS12 and on the Bandai Channel.

The anime had an OP and two ED songs. The OP was Melos no Yōni Lonely Way (Like Melos, Lonely Way), composed by Hideya Nakazaki and performed by Airmail from Nagasaki. The first ED song, which was for episodes 1–25, was Go-fun Dake no Wagamama (Just 5 Minutes of Selfishness), also composed by Hideya Nakazaki and performed by Seiko Tomizawa & Airmail from Nagasaki. The second ED song, which was for episodes 26–38, was La Rose Rouge (The Red Rose), composed by Tetsuji Hayashi and performed by Seiko Tomizawa.

Blue Comet's mech designs were done by Kunio Okawara.

In the summer of 2001, Bandai Entertainment announced plans to release the series in North America. However, as with Giant Gorg, the plan was scrapped. The complete series concluded the damaged, blue-tinted video masters from Sunrise, and were unable to acquire replacements. Bandai's license to this and Giant Gorg expired in 2005. In 2023, Discotek Media planned to release the series and the three accompanying OVAs on Blu-Ray, with fixed masters from the Japanese Blu-Ray release.

A Japanese Blu-Ray release was done on September 18, 2013, with the Blu-Ray Box and the Recollections 1996–2000 Blu-Ray Box version.

=== Video games ===
This series was included in Super Robot Wars J for the Game Boy Advance and Super Robot Wars GC for the GameCube. It was also featured in Shin Super Robot Wars (its debut) and Super Robot Wars 64 with a primary storyline role of all the Super Robot Wars it has appeared in. The anime also showed up in Super Robot Wars Operation Extend and Super Robot Wars DD.

The series also appears in the Another Century's Episode games, with the Layzner & Zakarl being playable in the first game and also the Greimkaiser & Bloodykaiser make appearances as CPU-only units. The sequel, Another Century's Episode 2, follows the basic plot of the series but adapts it to the setting produced by the combined plots of the anime involved. For example, Eiji's first appearance is just after the resolution of Martian Successor Nadesico, and the SDF-1 Macross's fold removes the heroes from Earth long enough for Grados to establish control over Manhattan. The heroes return in time to aid the resistance, and Eiji finally joins the team officially along with Domon Kasshu after they (and the player's current character) fight off the Demon Death Platoon and several Gundam Heads.

The series also appears in Harobots, since they're from Sunrise. Their units can act as 'wild' units or player units.
