= Takuo Kawamura =

Japanese voice actor

Takuo Kawamura (川村拓央, Kawamura Takuo) is a male Japanese voice actor from Saitama, Japan.

== Filmography ==
=== Anime ===
- Baki the Grappler as Gym Member B (ep 6); Naito
- Demonbane as Stone
- Detective Loki as Thief (ep 2)
- Fullmetal Alchemist as Examinee (ep 6)
- Happiness! as Hachisuke Takamizo
- Higurashi no Naku Koro ni as Katsuya Kumagai
- Hikaru no Go as Baseball Team member (ep 64); Chinese Pro (ep 67); Natsume
- Knight Hunters Eternity (eps 1,3,5,6)
- Kokoro Library as Gentleman (ep 2)
- Naruto as Shigure
- Please Twins! as Gonta
- Kimi ga Nozomu Eien as Coach
- Saiyuki as Guard
- Shrine of the Morning Mist as Blue Demon (eps 8–9)
- Sugar: A Little Snow Fairy as Neighbor (ep 15)

=== Drama CDs ===
- Danna-sama, Ote wo Douzo (Kunihiro Murata)

=== Video games ===
- Puyo Puyo Fever - Tarutaru, Hohow Bird
- Puyo Puyo Fever 2 - Tarutaru, Hohow Bird
- Puyo Puyo!! Quest - Tarutaru, Hohow Bird
- Puyo Puyo!! Quest Arcade - Tarutaru

=== Dubbing ===
- Black Hawk Down, PFC Todd Blackburn (Orlando Bloom)
- District 9, Fundiswa Mhlanga (Mandla Gaduka)
- John Q., Freddy B. (Keram Malicki-Sánchez)
- Saturday Night Fever, Joey (Joseph Cali)
