= Another Century's Episode =

2005 video game

- Developer: FromSoftware
- Publisher: Banpresto
- Director: Tomohiro Shibuya
- Designer: Yui Tanimura
- Programmer: Yoshiyuki Naito
- Writers: Yui Tanimura; Ayaka Ieki
- Series: Another Century's Episode
- Platform: PlayStation 2
- Release: JP: January 27, 2005
- Genre: Third-person shooter
- Modes: Single-player, multiplayer

Another Century's Episode (Note: Japanese: アナザーセンチュリーズエピソード, Hepburn: Anazā Senchurīzu Episōdo) is a 2005 third-person shooter video game published by Banpresto in Japan for the PlayStation 2. The player controls a mech from one of nine different anime robot franchises to destroy opposing forces before they steal a prized energy source for devious purposes. The game is divided into several different missions, where players use their mech and arsenal of weapons to fulfill mission objectives, ranging from destroying enemy machines to protecting a specific target.

Banpresto enlisted the help of FromSoftware, a Japanese developer known for its Armored Core series, to assist in the game's production. As Banpresto held the exclusive video game rights to several popular robot series, it envisioned the idea of a large crossover similar to Konami's Zone of the Enders games. It was designed by Yui Tanimura, who later directed Dark Souls II and co-directed Dark Souls III and Elden Ring, and incorporated music performed by singer Hitomi Shimatani.

Another Century's Episode was released to strong sales, and was one of the year's top-selling video games in Japan. Critics favorably compared its gameplay to Zone of the Enders, and enjoyed its wide selection of mechs and mission objectives. The game's success led many of the series represented, such as Metal Armor Dragonar, to see a renewal in popularity. It spawned a new franchise that includes soundtrack albums, merchandise, and four sequels.

== Gameplay ==
The player engaging in combat with an enemy

Another Century's Episode is a third-person shooter game. Players pilot a mecha from one of nine different anime series, each posing their own unique weapon loadouts and attack styles. Represented series include Aura Battler Dunbine, Mobile Suit Zeta Gundam, Brain Powered, and Blue Comet SPT Layzner. Its gameplay has been compared to the Zone of the Enders series; players fly their mecha around a large cubic environment and must complete a variety of mission objectives, each increasing in difficulty as they progress through the game. Objectives range from destroying formations of enemy mechas, to protecting a specific building from opposing forces, to clearing out a path of mines for a space shuttle.

Mechas can boost, or "dash", themselves forward. By dashing, players can avoid being hit by obstacles or enemy projectiles, however doing so drains the dash gauge and must recharge before it can be used again. Mechas can carry five different weapons or abilities, such as machine guns and other firearms. Most weapons need to recharge after every use, although some have limited ammunition and cannot be used once they are depleted. By firing the weapon close to a nearby enemy, players can perform a melee attack, which can be used to perform long chain reactions.

== Plot ==
In the future, mankind has rapidly advanced in technology, to the point where colonies orbiting Earth and Mars are constructed. However, political and economic strife have led to a recession that has affected the colonies the hardest. To deal with these issues, the multitude of Earth governments have united under the banner of the United Community of Earth (UCE). The attempted reorganization instead causes the formation of rebel forces, such as White Fang and the United Lunar Empire Gigano. To counter this, the UCE establishes a special task force, the Londo Bell, to eradicate them and similar groups.

During the same time frame, the UCE began the development of a new energy source called "E2", created in response to the global energy crisis affecting the Earth-orbiting colonies. Though powerful, E2 is also highly volatile, with many of the rebelling forces seeking to steal it for their own purposes. This leads to a worldwide war against the opposing groups, with the Londo Bell being sent out to stop them from stealing. The player assumes the role of a squad member working for the Londo Bell, teaming up with others to destroy those who seek to steal E2. In one mission, the Londo Bell destroys a shuttle fleet led by Char Aznable, carrying surplus amounts of E2. Undeterred, Aznable flees to the colonies orbiting Mars as the Londo Bell pursue him. A climactic battle ensues that leads to the destruction of the E2 energy and Aznable's defeat. However, using the refugee ship incident, hardliner Duke Dermail seizes power within the UCE government, replacing the pacifist Relena Peacecraft and foreshadowing the coming of a new war.

== Development and release ==
Another Century's Episode was developed as part of a collaboration between Banpresto and FromSoftware. A subsidiary of Bandai and the holder for the exclusive video game rights to several Japanese mecha franchises, Banpresto conceptualized a large crossover between them following the success of Konami's Zone of the Enders series. In addition to video games, Zone of the Enders expanded into other forms of media such as anime tie-ins, which is believed to have been what persuaded Banpresto to begin production of Another Century's Episode. To assist in the game's development, Banpresto enlisted the help of FromSoftware, a developer known for its Armored Core franchise. It was designed by Yui Tanimura, who would later direct the Dark Souls games, and directed by Tomohiro Shibuya. The game's opening and ending themes were performed by singer Hitomi Shimatani; she recalled the recording session having "high tension".

Banpresto announced Another Century's Episode on September 1, 2004, and demonstrated it during that year's Tokyo Game Show on September 24. The game was released in Japan on January 27, 2005. To commemorate its release, Enterbrain published a strategy guide that detailed its characters, mechas, and setting. On November 2, it was re-released under the PlayStation the Best budget label.

== Reception ==
Reception

Review score
| Publication | Score |
|---|---|
| Famitsu | 29/40 |

Another Century's Episode was a commercial hit for both FromSoftware and Banpresto. In its first week on the market, the game sold over 175,000 copies and became a best-seller for the platform. By the end of 2005, A.C.E. was one of the top-selling video games in Japan, with sales exceeding 254,000. It performed considerably better than FromSoftware's previous licensed game, the negatively-received Spriggan: Lunar Verse for the PlayStation.

The four reviewers from Famitsu magazine complimented the selection of playable mechas, their powerful attacks, and the attention to detail given to them. However, they were critical of the way they controlled, specifically while changing their altitude and orientation. Ollie Barder, a writer for GameSetWatch, likened its gameplay to Sega's Virtual On arcade fighter and its overall concept to Konami's Zone of the Enders series. He wrote that it felt like a spiritual successor to Virtual On in the way it controlled, believing that "in many ways it's a subtle change over Virtual On's initial implementation and more akin to the anime combat that inspired Sega's real robot franchise in the first place." Barder pointed out the flaws in its combat system, specifically its imperfect hit detection and slow game speed.

Retrospectively in 2012, Hardcore Gaming 101 writer Arshad Abdul-Aal favorably compared the gameplay and style of Another Century's Episode to Zone of the Enders, expressing his appreciation towards the variety of missions and solid selection of mechas. Abdul-Aal believed that the game's negative reputation online, likely due to the declining quality of its sequels, was undeserved, and concluded that it made for a fun and enjoyable game on its own accord.

== Legacy ==
Many of the mecha series represented in Another Century's Episode gained popularity as a result of its commercial success; for instance, Metal Armor Dragonar received a DVD box set and a line of art books after one of its mechas was featured in A.C.E.. This effect has been compared to Banpresto's Super Robot Wars series, which similarly increased the popularity of franchises that were represented in the games.

Another Century's Episode spawned a new franchise, consisting of merchandise, albums, and four sequels. The first of these, Another Century's Episode 2 (2006), does not continue the story of the first game as 2 has its own original plot, but has improved many of its faults, such as a refined melee combat system and faster pacing. Another Century's Episode 3: The Final (2007) was envisioned as the final installment, adding new features such as branching story paths and additional playable mechas. The fourth entry, Another Century's Episode: R (2010), was noticeably more plot-centric than previous installments, focusing primarily on an encompassing storyline and borrowing elements from role-playing games. Another Century's Episode Portable (2011), the last entry, omits the story entirely and instead focuses on completing a series of missions and destroying boss units. R and Portable were published by Namco Bandai Games, which in 2008 reorganized Banpresto into a toy company and absorbed its video game operations (although the games were published under the Banpresto brand).
