= Another Century's Episode 3: The Final =

2007 video game

- Developer: FromSoftware
- Publisher: Banpresto
- Platform: PlayStation 2
- Release: JP: September 6, 2007
- Genre: Action
- Modes: Single-player, multiplayer

Another Century's Episode 3: The Final (アナザーセンチュリーズエピソード 3 THE FINAL, Anazā Senchurīzu Episōdo Surī The Final), abbreviated as "A.C.E.3", is a mecha action video game produced by Banpresto and developed by FromSoftware. It was released for the PlayStation 2 on September 6, 2007.

Although it is subtitled "The Final", it is not the final entry in the A.C.E. series, which continued with the release of Another Century's Episode: R on the PlayStation 3 in August 2010.

== Plot ==
A.C.E.3 is set three years after the events of A.C.E. 2, during the final battle between the UCE and the Zentradi in A.C.E. 2 (the antagonists of Macross), known as The First Defensive War. It also mentions that the UCE forces has been reformed into the Earth Federation forces. The game's overall plot deals with the sudden appearance of a second, war-torn Earth from which new and more deadly enemies emerge. At the same time, enemies who survived the First Defensive War begin reappearing on the original Earth, further complicating matters.

The events of A.C.E. 3 are mainly centered on a device called the Baldora Drive, which was originally planned as a teleportation device for outer space travel in Earth A and the invasion of the space colonies in Earth B. Both sides abandoned the use of the Baldora Drive 18 years ago, but recently brought it back into service when they obtained the means to repair it. Through this device, a wormhole is created in space between the two Earths, which allows the protagonists to travel between them. However, as the wormhole expands due to the effect of the Baldora Charge (which is used to power the device) obtained from various sources of energy, the wormhole grows large enough to make the two earths collide with one another due to gravitational attraction, which will destroy all mankind on both Earths. In order to stop this, heroes from both sides must band together and find a way to stop the device before the wormhole fully expands.

The primary battleships in A.C.E.3 are the Gekko from Eureka Seven and the Nadesico B from The Prince of Darkness, with the latter eventually being replaced by the Nadesico C as per the movie's plot. Tower, the main ship from Getter Robo, also appears often in the game. The main ship of the Londo Bell (as well as the launching ship in A.C.E.), the Ra Cailum and its captain, Bright Noa, also appears in the game, but due to the death of Hirotaka Suzuoki (the voice actor for Bright) in 2006, most of his scenes in the game are cut, and his voiceovers reuse recorded material from A.C.E.

== Development ==
The game was shown to the public at the 2007 C3×HOBBY Chara-Hobby convention in Japan from August 18 to 20.

== Music ==
Hitomi Shimatani, who performed the opening and ending themes for the first A.C.E. game, returned to provide the themes for A.C.E. 3 as well. The opening theme is named "Shinku" ("深紅", "Scarlet"), and the ending theme is "Ai no Uta" (愛の詩, "Poem of Love"). The single containing both songs was released on September 5, 2007, one day before the game was released.

== Legacy ==
A sequel, Another Century's Episode: R, was released in Japan on August 19, 2010.
