= List of Brain Powerd episodes =

Cover of the first Perfect Box DVD boxset by Bandai Visual.

Brain Powerd is an anime television series created and directed by Yoshiyuki Tomino. The series is set on a future, decimated Earth after the discovery of a mysterious, alien spacecraft dubbed "Orphan". A group of researchers scour the planet for Orphan's disc plates using mecha called "Antibodies" in order to revive the craft, an event that would result in the utter destruction of all lifeforms on Earth. The protagonists Yu Isami and Hime Utsumiya must utilize a special Antibody called "Brain Powerd" to counter the Orphan plans and save humanity.

Brain Powerd was produced by Sunrise. The 26 episodes of the series aired weekly on Japan's satellite channel WOWOW from April 8 to November 11, 1998. The series also aired on the Japanese Animax and the Bandai Channel. Bandai first released the series on DVD in two halves on June 25, 1999, and September 25, 1999, as the Brain Powerd Perfect Box. Seven individual DVDs containing fewer episodes of the series each were released from July 25 to September 25, 2002. A "remastered" box set was released on August 24, 2007. Finally, Bandai released the entire series on DVD as Emotion the Best: Brain Powerd on April 7, 2011.

The English-dubbed version of Brain Powerd premiered on Animax in South Asia and Southeast Asia. In late 2000, Bandai Entertainment acquired the rights to distribute a dub in North America under the title Brain Powered. As with Silent Möbius, the first few episodes were released on VHS in the region as test marketing for the show. Three separate bilingual DVD sets were later released from May 21 to September 24, 2002. On April 26, 2006, the company released the entire series as Anime Legends: Brain Powered Complete Collection.

The music for Brain Powerd was composed by Yoko Kanno. The series features one opening theme, "In My Dream", written and performed by Eri Shingyōji, and one ending theme, "Ai no Fīrudo" (愛の輪郭(フィールド); lit. 'Field of Love'), composed and arranged by Kanno, with lyrics written by Rin Iogi (a pseudonym for Tomino), and performed by Kokia.

== Episode list ==
| No. | Title | Original release date |
|---|---|---|
| 1 | "Departing from the Ocean Depths"; Transliteration: "Shinkai wo Hasshite" (Japanese: 深海を発して) | April 8, 1998 |
It starts with a duo of reclaimers, Yuu and Kanaan piloting organic mechanized bots called anti bodies that do the job of gathering so called discs for their Orphan project, the aim of which is to use the discs to have more anti bodies towards resurfacing original Orphan alien mothership from the ocean deep beds. The discs being sentient, one flies away and starts wrecking a nearby city where after burying itself in the rubble, it gets found by the lead character Hime and chooses her to be the pilot of its anti body. Yuu and Kanaan with his anti bodies try to take it, as he deems her anti body a corrupted one, but cannot do much as it can neutralize his bot's attacks. He stops chasing the brain powerd one, as it is also carrying children. A full year later, Yuu, disillusioned by the earlier event, has seen the apocalyptic nature of this Orphan project and flees the base of operations with his own anti body, much to his family's dismay.
| 2 | "Fated Reunion"; Transliteration: "Unmei no Saikai" (Japanese: 運命の再会) | April 15, 1998 |
Yuu now getting chased by some of his previous comrades, gets saved by Hime's brain powerd and they have a bittersweet encounter. Yuu agrees with Orphan being the one behind his family's apathy towards the people's suffering so he goes on a lone quest to find some disc researchers, not knowing that Hime's party are tracking him. After finding a scientist, yuu wants to make her reveal her research about the anti body but she gives him the slip and tries to pilot the bot out of curiosity. Yuu tries to stop her, they have a scuffle around the bot and it nearly crash lands close to a children's refugee centre. Back at the Orphan base, Yuu's elder sister, Ikie, now calling herself Quincy Issa, vows to kill even her own brother to make sure the Orphan project does not get ruined.
| 3 | "Yuu's Battle"; Transliteration: "Yū no Tatakai" (Japanese: 勇の戦い) | April 22, 1998 |
Yuu's sister and Glenn, an arrogant guy and ex-mentor to Yuu, decide to mobilize a force of five anti bodies to go capture Yuu. But he anticipates them and starts building countermeasure in the form of microwave weapons and gathers the help of the scientists. While there the tracker team from Hime'a party come, along with Hime herself. Yuu and Hime have another out of the ordinary encounter. The tracker duo talk to him about being recruited to the other side, but he relents. Then when the attacking force from the Orphan project arrives, Yuu subdues with the microwave weapon. During the battle a tsunami surge approaches, because of Orphan activities, threatening to destroy Hime's childhood home and its inhabitants. So, then, Yuu heroically keeps the tsunami surge at bay until it loses its intensity.
| 4 | "The Hometown Flame"; Transliteration: "Kokyō no Honō" (Japanese: 故郷の炎) | April 29, 1998 |
While recuperating from the ordeal and rescuing people from the rubble, Yuu leaves the place and goes to his childhood home. There he meets his former comrade Kanaan, who gets urged by Yuu to leave the Orphan project, but she refuses, as from perspective, Orphan provides a sense of belonging, saving her from her abandonment issues. But she does not reveal Yuu's location, redirecting her teammate, Dain, away. Dain on the other hand, highly suspects Kanaan and questions her dedication. Yuu back at his grandmother Naoko's home. Takes a nap, after trying to find some useful info. Then Hime and others arrive there. Figuring why Yuu left Orphan project and meets Yuu there and also Granma Naoko who also got there. At that moment, Dain attacks the place with a doubtful Kanaan tagging along. Grandma Naoko takes shelter and stays safe there. Kanan sees Hime and remembers her from a year ago. After a cheap hit at his childhood home, Yuu finishes off Dain's robot with one strike and contemplates what to do next.
| 5 | "Friend or Foe"; Transliteration: "Teki ka Mikata ka" (Japanese: 敵か味方か) | May 6, 1998 |
Two new recruits join Hime's new party, Sazzie, a girl with no regard for ceremony and Komodo, a blue-eyed Yoruba girl and Ogun devotee. At the Orphan project base underwater, Glen decides to put Kannan on recon duty and designates Shiela to shadow her, still big time suspecting her. Kannan tracks the ship base of Hime's party, the Novis Noah ship, where she battles with Hime. Yuu is strictly put on standby. After the recon ends unceremoniously, Yuu sneaks away with his bot and follows Kanaan's trace. They meet at a town, where Yuu again strongly urges Kanaan to switch sides and not let her abandonment issues cause her to be a tyrannical party's lackey. Then Shiela attacks the town, trying to kill them both. Hime following them, joins the fight. Kanaan because of her indeterminateness, fails her bot, but barely gets saved by Yuu and they then mend their rift officially.
| 6 | "Double Revival"; Transliteration: "Daburu Ribaibaru" (Japanese: ダブル·リバイバル) | May 13, 1998 |
In this episode Kanaan and Yuu talk about the new experience switching sides can bring, Then the central command tracks down a whole bunch of plates/discs strewn about somewhere, so they just send Comodo as recon. She begrudgingly goes, but she sees that female scientist again, and an eight unit squadron of antibodies, approaching the site. After requesting backup, Hime goes and Yuu tags along, in the same bot. Also the tracker duo, taking with them Kanaan with Yuu's bot decides to aid them. Hime's bot, assisted by Comodo, engages the squadron and its leader Glenn near their ocean deep base. In the brawl, one disc slips away. Glenn's squadron do not want to bother picking it up, so they stop engaging Hime and go their way. The disc that got left starts reviving and it produces twin brain powerds for Hime and the others to see.
| 7 | "Rejection"; Transliteration: "Kyohihannō" (Japanese: 拒否反応) | May 20, 1998 |
Kanaan and Sazzie are trying to get in the new duo of brain powerd, but at that same time the Glenn and the others are plotting a re-assault on these new bots. Hime, Yuu and the others immediately start defending., with the air force giving assistance. One of the Orphan project commanders, Edgar, activates a bright red disc and immediately pursues the brain powerds with a bot just been born, a feat that is supposed to be dangerous. Although initially it appears to be a bit much to handle for the Hime's party, they still pull through it with Kannan and Sazzie duo performing a successful counterblow to this rampaging antibody.
| 8 | "At the Port of Call"; Transliteration: "Kikōchi de" (Japanese: 寄港地で) | May 27, 1998 |
Yuu and Hime escort the captain and other important officials to a financier meeting. There he gets frustrated with the financier's naivete and not heeding his call for more accurate action. Back at the base, Kanaan and Russ see Dain again as a spy collecting secret intel on the organic engine of Novis Noah. The pursuit to catch him fails and he flees with the help of Shiela's bot unit taking sensitive intel.
| 9 | "Jonathan's Sword"; Transliteration: "Jonasan no Yaiba" (Japanese: ジョナサンの刃) | June 17, 1998 |
Jonathan Glenn finally makes a bold move, posing as an associate of an Arab sheikh wanting to buy the entire ship, in exchange for financing the ship's military projects. He takes the captain, who gets revealed as his mother, grandma Naoko, lil' Kumazo, Geybridge and some other officials as his hostages. He aims to get to the B-plates using the hostages and other sensitive info about Novis Noah. He has Shiela and the others standing by, for getaway purposes. But the Captain activates the voice only protocol, which also lets the other crew know about this situation. Then Geybridge and others lure him to a place where b-plates are supposedly stored and lock out that place completely, ready for any consequences. Enraged, Glenn berates the captain for abandoning him, prioritizing her job, blaming her for conceiving him from a sperm donor, resulting in a lack of father figure. During that time, the other crew use the other children duo, go through a vent space and untie the others, while lil' Kumazo distracts Glenn. Then others disarm his weapon, Yuu comes in with wall strike, but Glenn still gets away with lil' Kumazo as hostage. Seeing his getaway is being thwarted by brain powerd units, he lets the boy go, but not before praising the boy's bravery.
| 10 | "Temptation of the Plates"; Transliteration: "Purēto no Yūwaku" (Japanese: プレートの誘惑) | June 24, 1998 |
Captain Anoa, in an emotionally wrecked state, takes up the duty of her captaincy after some time contemplating her failure as a mother. Back at the Neutria base, Glenn is convinced of Orphan's win as he has seen firsthand the collection of all plates in the ship, and as he has bombed the ships engine, does also think that the ship would not be much of a threat anymore. So, he steamrolls the process of finally getting a B-plate. But the b-plate itself seem to be following the ship itself, causing all forces of Novis Noah, to converge on that point to collect, including a desperate Captain, eager to get her honour as a captain. The sentient plate picks up on it, tempts the captain and consumes it. Thus ending the episode on a cliffhanger.
| 11 | "Sister and Brother"; Transliteration: "Ane to Otōto" (Japanese: 姉と弟) | July 1, 1998 |
In this episode, after the disappearance of the captain, the acupuncture lady is appointed as the new leader of the ship. And then the ship hosts a financier meeting, there Yuu's dad appears much to the chagrin of Yuu. Then a dual perspective outside of the conflict between Orphan project and Novis Noah discloses itself. As it turns out, there are people who want to support both the Orphan and Novis Noah, as they see it back up of each other. If the Orphan supposedly delivers on its energy toward cosmos promise, then all is well; but on the flip side if it is not then it is also a good plan to have Novis Noah as a shelter ship. Yuu's sister, Ikie, calling herself, Quincy Issa attacks the base, and she fights intensely with Yuu. Although it is still his sister deep down, she is too dedicated to the Orphan project to the point of not wanting to end hostilities with her brother. Exhausted by this family dynamic, Yuu leaves the Novis Noah for some contemplation.
| 12 | "Independent Course of Action"; Transliteration: "Tandokukō" (Japanese: 単独行) | July 8, 1998 |
After finding Yuu at a local restaurant while shopping, Hime with the other children start bickering with him. Then Yuu's father gets seen. Yuu follows him and sees him in a warehouse making some shady deal. The deal goes awry, Yuu saves his dad and then some of the discs connected to the deal gets scattered all over the town. Using this commotion, Yuu's dad flees again with Yuu following him. He tries to convince him to stop all this, but in vain. Yuu follows him with his bot, with lil' Kumazo tagging along. They get to an unexplored section of the Orphan ship, where Shiela catches lil' Kumazo sneaking along. Yuu then urges Shiela to give up Orphan's poisonous dream and not let her trauma to get used by. They have a scuffle. With the help of other brain powerd, Yuu and Kumazo escape the lair.
| 13 | "Stately Surfacing"; Transliteration: "Dōdōtaru Fujō" (Japanese: 堂々たる浮上) | July 22, 1998 |
The Orphan ship finally has started surfacing, causing grand tsunamis and killing many people. Then a plan to stop this gets afoot. Yuu is really saddened by the fact he could not stop all of this. To counter Novis Noah's plan, a grand battle unit led by Glenn finally starts an assault on it, with the bots from the other side defending the plan instruments. The climactic battle has begun.
| 14 | "Are Souls Solitary?"; Transliteration: "Tamashii wa Kodoku?" (Japanese: 魂は孤独?) | July 29, 1998 |
The battle is going on and the plan halt the Orphan ship from surfacing becomes a success. But before delivering the final blow the UN central command orders the Novis Noah ship to end this mission at that critical point. Yuu is distraught again as his rival Glenn just admitted to get intimate with both his sister and his mother, and used that to question his determinacy, which led to Yuu not able to fare better against him this time. Back at the station, Geybridge decides to not pay heed to the order to suspend the attack, rather keep on going to fully submerge or maybe destroy the Orphan ship.
| 15 | "Perfect Breakthrough"; Transliteration: "Itten Toppa" (Japanese: 一点突破) | August 5, 1998 |
Spearheaded by Yuu and Russ, Kanaan, Hime and couple others decide to make suicide run toward the Orphan ship. They get to know that, Orphan is not completely a unitary organic ship, it is actually composed of two opposing sides and the side they are supporting, the side that wants to kill Orphan mothership hopefully destroys also itself in the process. So, Geybridge trusts Irene to take the blame for this rogue operation as the flip side of it is world destruction. So, the charge begins, Yuu as a distraction decides to pinpoint, after taking care of Glenn, some explosive power directed to the top of the mothership structure, but he fails. Nonetheless, this helps with the distraction, and in actuality Russ, goes to the lower section, helped by the submarine fleet Kymelius sees a vulnerable part, then gets manipulated by his brain bot seeking revenge, repeats the same stuff Yuu tried, gets ejected, then a shocked Kanaan with her bot rescue him. With this, the Orphan finally stops rising up.
| 16 | "The Uninvited Guest"; Transliteration: "Manekarezaru Kyaku" (Japanese: 招かれざる客) | August 12, 1998 |
Orphan has turned into the size of an entire mountain range, creating its own atmosphere around it, sinking any ship that may be trying to escape its ensuing wrath. Novis Noah is trying to save as many people as possible. In an outing like this, Yuu and Hime decide to save an entire cruise ship. There, yuu sees a newcomer called Nayki, approaching the Orphan ship, with a suspicious manner. He actually came to the Novis Noah having his own intention, with the previous Arab sheikh Mr. Mohammad for arranging a financier deal targeted at increasing its refugee harbouring capabilities. Also supplying many necessary stolen and smuggled anti-bodies. Yuu having followed, sees his now crazed sister Quincy Issa/Issei, who in her mind must kill her sibling to survive in the Orphan ship. Nayki wants to help, but he does not fare well. Hime barely makes it to the battle, after saving the ship, only to see Yuu's pushed to the stratosphere by her sister's bot and the Orphan ship again started moving. With that, the episode concludes in a cliffhanger.
| 17 | "Beyond the Curtain"; Transliteration: "Kāten no Mukō de" (Japanese: カーテンの向こうで) | August 19, 1998 |
Yuu after that heavy pushing is stranded somewhere near the arctic circle, Alaska maybe, there a crazed Jonathan Glenn attacks him at his weakest with a new bot, to finally finish him off. But before anything, their fight is stopped by two figures, a girl named Nelly with her own bot and masked, caped figure called Barron Maximillien. Yuu goes with the girl and Glenn goes with the Barron, who apparently gave him the bot. Then Yuu spends time with the girl, getting attached to her, during a snowstorm. Come morning, they barely escape Glenn's attack, which destroys her hut. Yuu with his injured bot decides to defend her.
| 18 | "The Depths of Love"; Transliteration: "Ai no Fuchi" (Japanese: 愛の淵) | August 26, 1998 |
After defending against Glenn for some time, they again flee to a faraway place, talk some more, bond some more. Come morning Nelly bot is seen ice-skating in the nearby lake, they then decide to use the lake for finally defeating Glenn's assault. So Glenn comes, gets ambushed, does not work that well, so Nelly who has been near death all this time, finally decides to let Yuu be the pilot of a merge bot revival, and then welcomes death in the icy lake. Glen flees heeding the advice of the Baron begrudgingly, as this heartbroken Yuu would be terrifying in battle.
| 19 | "The Moving Mountain Range"; Transliteration: "Ugoku Sanmyaku" (Japanese: 動く山脈) | September 16, 1998 |
As the Orphan mother ship moves more and more, it creates tectonic disturbances all over the Pacific Ocean and coastal states surrounding it. The main culprit behind the Orphan project, the Governor, makes an arrangement with the US government to help each other. Yuu gets stranded again in a village and captured in gunpoint in Chinese pacific coastal territory, along with Nayki and Hime who were there to save him. They eventually get out of their bindings and flee the area with their bots before the thieving residents selling them to US troops stationed nearby. Back at the Orphan headquarters, Glenn sees the marking of Orphan's deal with the US everywhere and heavily dislikes it.
| 20 | "The Governor's Ambitions"; Transliteration: "Gabanā no Yabō" (Japanese: ガバナーの野望) | September 23, 1998 |
The Governor finally reveals himself and it turns out to be Commander Geybridge and Yuu's Grandma, who are both completely ok to make the deal for having a UN-Orphan partnership. They were supposed to be away for attending a US delegate, and it turned out this was their business. He immediately orders a whole fleet of US piloted Grand Cher's to Novis Noah ship to make it surrender. Spotting it Yuu, Hime, Nayki and newly piloting Kestner, decide to promptly stop the fleet's advance. They were not doing so good, then at that moment Orphan's consciousness itself decides to lend a hand, giving the US pilots hallucinatory images, leading them to target each other and destroy. Seeing it Hime takes it upon herself and others to have a talk with the Orphan's core conscious to find a common ground for peace.
| 21 | "A Problem of Hallucination"; Transliteration: "Genshi Sakusō" (Japanese: 幻視錯綜) | September 30, 1998 |
A US fleet has demanded to the Novis Noah to return all the kids it took as "refugees", allegedly, or else the fleet will take strict measure to force it, on a battleship full of refugee kids. Novis Noah personnel have only an inkling of a guess as to why the US maybe doing this: They want the Orphan mothership and would like to have the entirety of pacific coast, the governments of whom are in disarray. So for that, they would like to eliminate any threats like Novis Noah ship which could get in their way. Captain Irene starts focusing on the evacuation of all the kids and initiating the organic engine shield, knowing that the US will fire the moment they finish their end of bargain, which they do. Using the shield, the ballistic nuclear missile, is redirected to the Orphan mountain range, where a lot of people, refugees and military personnel get annihilated. Taking advantage of this, Gaybridge claims that it was the Novis Noah's nuclear strike toward the Orphan ship and broadcasts it thusly. So, all the other US fleet fires off multiple rounds of ballistic missile barrages of nuclear origin, which in the same manner gets sent off Orphan mothership again, but his time, Kestner, Nayki, Yuu, along with Glenn, Issei and Shiela join in to form a mass barrier to stop this onslaught and anyone else from getting killed. Meanwhile, mysteriously Hime has found the main alien entity disguising as a crying lil' girl after traversing through an ethereal plane and feints, along with others. The other brain bots venture there to save them.
| 22 | "All or Nothing"; Transliteration: "Kenkon Itteki" (Japanese: 乾坤一擲) | October 14, 1998 |
Yuu finds her sister Issei unconscious and really timid and submissive unlike before. He brings her to the ship, where the others have not come back. There Issei settles in, bonds with the kids and genuinely likes it there. But its robot, grand cher, does not so, It tries to get Issei out of the ship using its long nail like protrusions, except Yuu will not let it. So, the robot flees by itself followed closely by Higgin's and bot.
| 23 | "Sweet Memories"; Transliteration: "Suīto Memorīzu" (Japanese: スイート·メモリーズ) | October 21, 1998 |
Higgins follows Issei bot and finds herself trapped among multiple grand cher led by Shiela, who have her on the backfoot with their new battle tactics, like stun bars. Hime also joins her after being unconscious in Orphan and inform Higgins about the Governor's true identity which was disclosed to her there. They then get scattered to many different chambers by the sentient ship. Hime goes to womb like chamber where she sees her dead mother and how the actual Orphan ship collided with earth, which makes Hime think that Orphan at a conscious level is not much harmful as everyone says it is. She then gets ejected to outside, like Higgins and meets with Yuu and Kanaan to see the Orphan ship finally rising above the ground little bit little.
| 24 | "Tricking Memories"; Transliteration: "Kioku no Itazura" (Japanese: 記憶のいたずら) | October 28, 1998 |
Yuu and Hime comes back to the ship. No sooner than that, Issei/Ikie just hops on in Hime's bot and leaves for Orphan. An emotionally damaged Issei somehow controls the brain bot and tries to maneuver it to get it to Orphan followed closely by Yuu and Hime. But the bot somehow reaches her childhood home, where her bot appears followed by Glenn, who at that point had taken over Orphan leadership position defeating the governor. There, during her moving from Hime's bot to hers, she has a big flashback about her grandmother, about Isami family's connection with Orphan mothership for three generation. With that her bot upgrades to a higher level, and then she leaves to Orphan with Glenn.
| 25 | "Orphan's Hesitation"; Transliteration: "Orufan no Tamerai" (Japanese: オルファンのためらい) | November 4, 1998 |
A final showdown near Orphan finally begins. Kant, Yuu, Hime, Kanaan, Russ, Ranga, Comodo, Nayki start a final charge. They are met with US grand chers and old foes. They fight for some time until Orphan recalls all of the defenders. The gang then have to face Issei, who overpowers almost all of them with her skin flaying technique. Hime tries to take Orphan's control away from her, but she merges with the Orphan core to prevent it.
| 26 | "Flight"; Transliteration: "Hishō" (Japanese: 飛翔) | November 11, 1998 |
Yuu and Hime are at a flower field, there they are attacked by Baron Maximillien who himself as Jonathan Glenn's Mother, Captain Anoa. After she fails to kill Yuu, she becomes terribly exhausted and then she is taken away by Glenn. Then after sharing a passionate kiss, Yuu decides this time he'll talk to Orphan core to unmerge his sister which works, and then Orphan alien leaves the earth, since arriving there as a refugee. People only mistook because of the reclaimer's dirty narrative. And with that, the series meets somewhat of a conclusive ending.
