= Brain Powerd =

Japanese anime television series

- ブレンパワード
- Genre: Mecha; Science fiction
- Created by: Hajime Yatate; Yoshiyuki Tomino
- Directed by: Yoshiyuki Tomino (chief)
- Music by: Yoko Kanno
- Country of origin: Japan
- Original language: Japanese
- No. of episodes: 26 (list of episodes)

Production
- Producers: Hideyuki Tomioka; Masaki Kaifu; Kazuhiko Ikeguchi
- Production companies: Sunrise; WOWOW; Bandai Visual

Original release
- Network: WOWOW
- Release: April 8 – November 11, 1998

Related
- Manga
- Written by: Yoshiyuki Tomino
- Illustrated by: Yukiru Sugisaki
- Published by: Kadokawa Shoten
- English publisher: NA: Tokyopop
- Magazine: Monthly Shōnen Ace
- Original run: May 27, 1998 – January 29, 2001
- Volumes: 4
- Light novel
- Written by: Yoshiyuki Tomino, Akemi Mende
- Published by: Kadokawa Haruki Corporation
- Original run: December 15, 1998 – February 13, 1999
- Volumes: 3

Brain Powerd [sic] (Japanese: ブレンパワード, Hepburn: Buren Pawādo) is a Japanese anime television series produced by Sunrise. It was created and directed by Gundam series creator, Yoshiyuki Tomino and features mecha designs by Mamoru Nagano, character designs by Mutsumi Inomata, and music by Yoko Kanno. The 26 episodes of the series originally premiered on the satellite channel WOWOW between April and November 1998. The series was also aired across Japan on the anime network Animax, which also later broadcast the series across its respective networks worldwide, including its English language networks in Southeast Asia and South Asia. Animax aired Bandai Entertainment's localization, the series' English language television premiere. The anime series was licensed by Bandai and distributed across the region on DVD under the title Brain Powered.

The series is set on a future, decimated Earth after the discovery of a mysterious, alien spacecraft dubbed "Orphan." A group of researchers scour the planet for Orphan's disc plates using mecha called "Antibodies" in order to revive the craft, an event that would result in the utter destruction of all lifeforms on Earth. The protagonists Yu Isami and Hime Utsumiya must utilize a special Antibody called "Brain Powerd" to counter the Orphan plans and save humanity.

It was adapted into a manga, with art by Yukiru Sugisaki, which was serialized in Kadokawa Shoten magazine Shōnen Ace and later published in the United States in English by Tokyopop. A series of light novels, music CDs, and other merchandise relating to Brain Powerd also exist.

== Plot ==
Brain Powerd is set in a future time in which Earth has been afflicted by earthquakes and floods. The source of this is a traced to a gargantuan, alien spacecraft dubbed "Orphan," which sits deep beneath the Pacific Ocean. Scientists Kensaku Isami and Midori Isami work within Orphan in order to uncover its vast knowledge, reach the Earth's surface with the craft, and travel the galaxy, resulting in the annihilation of all lifeforms on Earth. Their agents, the "Reclaimers," pilot living organic mechas (or "Antibodies") in the army Grand Cher, and seek to retrieve Orphan's vital disc plates which are scattered across the planet. The series begins with the teenage lead Hime Utsumiya venturing upon such a disc plate, which revives into a unique Antibody, called "Brain Powerd," with which she forms a deep connection. Within a year, Hime joins a group wishing to counter the ideals of the Orphan researchers, stationed aboard the battleship Novis Noah. She is soon joined by Yu Isami, an ex-Reclaimer who leaves Orphan after learning of the catastrophe his parents seek to unleash. Hime and Yu soon enter upon an adventure which may decide the future of humanity.

== Production ==
Brain Powerd was produced by Sunrise and directed and written by Yoshiyuki Tomino, the creator of the long-running Gundam franchise. Brain Powerd is often compared to the Gainax's popular Neon Genesis Evangelion, a 1995 anime series with similar themes to Brain Powerd. He was enthusiastic about his first attempt at the "organic" mecha subgenre in place of the purely metallic robots he had worked with for so many years in his career. He wanted to write an interesting story for Brain Powerd in order to allow those who watched it to do so without "having a nervous breakdown" and to show fans "that there were often other things out there better than anime." Tomino has wished that more animators would see themselves as entertainers, though he admitted that he felt that Brain Powerd was not very entertaining and thus a failure in this regard.

Tomino was joined by a team of writers at Sunrise under the pseudonym Hajime Yatate. Other staff included The Weathering Continent and Windaria character designer Mutsumi Inomata; The Five Star Stories and Heavy Metal L-Gaim mecha designer Mamoru Nagano; and Macross Plus and The Vision of Escaflowne music composer Yoko Kanno. Nagano had also previously worked with Tomino Mobile Suit Zeta Gundam. Kanno described Tomino as "not detailed at all" when compared to other directors with which she worked. She found that he was concerned with human "age" in regards to each piece of music so that viewers of all ages would understand. The opening theme "In My Dream" was written and performed by Eri Shingyōji. The ending theme "Ai no Fīrudo" (愛の輪郭(フィールド); lit. 'Field of Love') was composed and arranged by Kanno, with lyrics written by Rin Iogi (a pseudonym for Tomino), and the song performed by Kokia.

== Media ==
=== Anime ===
The 26-episode Brain Powerd anime initially aired weekly on Japan's satellite channel WOWOW from April 8 to November 11, 1998. The series was also broadcast on the Japanese Animax and the Bandai Channel. Bandai first released the series on DVD in two halves on June 25, 1999, and September 25, 1999, as the Brain Powerd Perfect Box. Seven individual DVDs containing fewer episodes of the series each were released from July 25 to September 25, 2002. A "remastered" box set was released on August 24, 2007. Finally, Bandai released the entire series on DVD as Emotion the Best: Brain Powerd on April 7, 2011.

The English-dubbed version of Brain Powerd premiered on Animax in South Asia and Southeast Asia. In late 2000, Bandai Entertainment acquired the rights to distribute a dub in North America with the spelling Brain Powered. As with the licensed Silent Möbius, only the first few episodes were released on VHS in the region as test marketing for the show. The original opening sequence, which largely depicts nude women, was completely redone for the release. Three separate bilingual DVD sets totaling all 26 episodes were made available in North American retailers May 21 to September 24, 2002. The unedited opening sequences was restored for the DVD version. On April 26, 2006, the company compiled and released the entire series as Anime Legends: Brain Powered Complete Collection. Following the 2012 closure of Bandai Entertainment, Sunrise announced at Otakon 2013, that Sentai Filmworks has rescued Brain Powerd, along with a handful of other former BEI titles.

=== Manga and light novels ===
A manga prelude to the Brain Powerd television series, featuring the original story penned by Tomino and illustrations by Yukiru Sugisaki, was serialized monthly in the Japanese Kadokawa Shoten magazine Shōnen Ace beginning in the January 1998 issue. A total of four tankōbon chapter collections were released from May 27, 1998, to January 29, 2001. The original manga was licensed for English translation and publication by Tokyopop in early 2003, also with the spelling Brain Powered. All four volumes were published between June 17, 2003, and January 6, 2004. Tokyopop replaced the Japanese version's color pages with highly saturated monochrome for their English release. As of May 2, 2005, the manga is out-of-print in North America.

A series of three light novels written by Tomino and Akemi Mende were also published in Japan by Kadokawa Haruki Corporation:

No.	Title	Author	Publisher	Date	ISBN
1	Brain Powerd: Deep Origination (ブレンパワード 深海より発して, Brain Powerd Shinkai Yori Hasshi Te)	Akemi Mende	Kadokawa Haruki Corporation	December 15, 1998	978-4-89456-478-7
2	Brain Powerd: Behind the Curtain (ブレンパワード カーテンの向こうで, Brain Powerd Kāten No Mukou De)	Akemi Mende	Kadokawa Haruki Corporation	January 14, 1999	978-4-89456-486-2
3	Brain Powerd: Journey to Remember (ブレンパワード 記憶への旅立ち, Brain Powerd Kioku Heno Tabidachi)	Yoshiyuki Tomino (as Minoru Yokitani)	Kadokawa Haruki Corporation	February 13, 1999	978-4-89456-496-1

=== CDs and other merchandise ===
A two-volume soundtrack featuring a total of 38 background and vocal tracks from the Brain Powerd anime series was published by Victor Entertainment in Japan on August 5, 1998, and November 21, 1998. CD singles featuring the opening theme by Eri Shingyōji and the closing theme by Kokia have also been released.

A non-scale model kit of Hime's Brain Powerd mecha was released by Bandai shortly after the show's debut. A Brain Powerd line of colored plastic non-scale model kits was released starting in November 2022 under Good Smile Company's Moderoid line. The line includes You (Yu) Brain, Hime Brain, Quincy's Grand Cher, Jonathan's Grand Cher, and a generic Grand Cher.

A single artbook titled Brain Powerd Spiral Book was published by Gakken in Japan on June 28, 1999. Characters and mecha from Brain Powerd have been featured alongside other Sunrise properties in video games published by Banpresto including Another Century's Episode for the PlayStation 2 and PlayStation Portable, 2nd Super Robot Wars Alpha for the PlayStation 2, and Super Robot Wars J for the Game Boy Advance.

== Reception ==
Jonathan Clements and Helen McCarthy of The Anime Encyclopedia summarized Brain Powerd "as if Tomino and his crew were thrown in at the deep end and told to wing it," though they found it "curiously watchable, thanks largely to Yoko Kanno's wonderful music."
