= Bin Shimada =

Japanese actor (born 1954)

- 島田 敏
- Born: Satoshi Shimada; November 20, 1954 (age 71); Niigata, Niigata, Japan
- Education: Daito Bunka University
- Occupations: Actor; voice actor; narrator
- Years active: 1978–present
- Agent: Aoni Production
- Notable work: Dragon Ball Z as Broly; Fist of the North Star as Juda; Bismark as Richard Lancelot; Mobile Suit Zeta Gundam as Paptimus Scirocco
- Height: 164 cm (5 ft 5 in)
- Spouse: Kyoko Minami

Bin Shimada (Japanese: 島田 敏, romanized: Shimada Bin; born November 20, 1954) is a Japanese actor, voice actor, and narrator affiliated with the talent management firm Aoni Production.

== Filmography ==
=== Television animation ===
- Urusei Yatsura (1981), Tobimaro Mizunokoji
- Galactic Gale Baxingar (1982), Kay Malorn
- Bismark (1984), Richard Lancelot
- Fist of the North Star (1985), Yuda
- Mobile Suit Zeta Gundam (1985), Paptimus Scirocco
- Saint Seiya (1985), Merak Beta Hägen
- Ranma ½ (1989), Sentarō Daimonji, An-Man
- Moomin (1990), Anton
- Shima Shima Tora no Shimajirō (1993), Sota Midorihara, Dot
- Sailor Moon (1993–1995), Yuichiro Kumada – first, second, third, and fourth seasons
- Mahojin Guru Guru (1995), Yanban
- You're Under Arrest (1996; 2001; 2007), Ken Nakajima
- Dr. Slump (1998), King Nikochan – 2nd series
- Yu-Gi-Oh! (1998), Akaboshi
- One Piece (1999-), Wapol, Foxy, Shimotsuki Yasuie
- Inuyasha (2000), Kōtatsu the Hell Painter
- Kiddy Grade (2002), Mistelle
- Naruto (2002), Kamikiri
- The Galaxy Railways (2003), Leon
- Rumic Theater (2003), Mr. Fuha
- Angel Heart (2005), Doc
- Chibi Maruko-chan (2010), Tomozou Sakura Replaced Takeshi Aono
- Digimon Xros Wars (2010), Omegamon, Starmon, Jijimon, Tactimon
- Nyaruko: Crawling with Love (2012), Nodens
- Kaito Joker (2014), Silver Heart
- World Trigger (2014), Eizō Netsuki
- Dragon Ball Super (2017), Dispo, Kanpaari
- GeGeGe no Kitarō (2018), Konaki-Jijii and Nurikabe
- Wave, Listen to Me! (2020), Yoshiki Takarada
- Bleach: Thousand-Year Blood War (2022), Pernida Parnkgjas
- Tying the Knot with an Amagami Sister (2024), Chidori Amagami
- Rurouni Kenshin: Kyoto Disturbance (2025), Saizuchi

Unknown date

- Beet the Vandel Buster, Hazan
- Blue Gender, Ted
- Bomberman B-Daman Bakugaiden, Chibīdabon
- The Brave Fighter of Legend Da-Garn, Tadashi Nemoto, Big Lander, Land Bison
- Chōsha Raideen, Spectre
- Chūka Ichiban, Admiral Li's subordinate, adult Zhang, others
- Cyborg Kuro-chan, Būrusu
- Detective Conan, Atsuhiko Wakizaka, Mineto Kanaya
- Don't Leave Me Alone, Daisy, Kin-chan
- Dragon Ball GT, Suguro, Sonpara
- Dragon Ball Z, West Kaiō, Cell Jr.
- Dragon Ball Kai, Kami (after Takeshi Aono), Bobbidi
- F-Zero Falcon Legend, Silver Nielsen
- Firestorm, Steve Johnson
- Future GPX Cyber Formula, Jackie Gudelhian, Akira Hiyoshi
- Guardian Angel Getten, Producer
- Genesis Climber Mospeada, Stick Bernard
- Genji Tsūshin Agedama, Tsuriban, Kacchi, Modem, Akira Fukuzawa
- Genki Bakuhatsu Ganbaruger, (Rikiya Ryūzaki (Red Ganba), Erudoran
- Ginga Reppū Baxinger, Kei Malone
- Gintama, Gengai Hiraga – Enchousen onwards
- Heavy Metal L-Gaim, Anton, Chai Char, Muto, Mesh
- Hero Bank, Kurayasu Kōshō
- Highschool! Kimen-gumi, Ichirō Shinjitsu
- Infinite Ryvius, Luxen Hojo, Radan
- Itazura Na Kiss, Shigeo Aihara
- Jushin Liger, Doru Commando
- Kindaichi Case Files, Seiji Kobayashi
- Kirby: Right Back at Ya!, Quixano
- Kiteretsu Daihyakka, Kikunojō Hanamaru, Ryū, Rokusuke, Shiro Karasu
- Kūsō Kagaku Sekai Gulliver Boy, Baron Mangetsu
- Kyo kara Maoh!, Vinon
- Lassie, Hamilton, Carey-sensei
- Les Misérables: Shōjo Cosette, Mabeuf
- Marmalade Boy, Yōji Matsuura, Master
- Marude Dameo, Nūbō
- Mashin Eiyūden Wataru 2, Hanbunburugu Kyōdai (eldest brother), Ūrontī, Kamoshirēnu
- Metal Armor Dragonar, Karl Gainer, 1st Lt. Zin
- Mobile Suit Gundam ZZ, 2nd Lt. Niki, Nie Gihren
- Nanatsu no Umi no Tico, Enrico
- Nangoku Shōnen Papuwa-kun, Tōhoku Miyagi
- Nintama Rantarō, Hemu Hemu, others Replace by: Ginzō Matsuo
- Nekketsu Saikyō Go-Saurer, Tarō Shirogane, Toshio Takagi, Erudoran
- Petopeto-san, Tonio Fujimura
- Pokémon, Dr. Akihabara (episode Dennō Senshi Porygon)
- Robin Hood no Daibōken, Little John
- Robot Girls Z, Dr. Hell
- Saber Rider and the Star Sheriffs, Richard
- s-CRY-ed, Urizane, Biff(understudy)
- Sgt. Frog, 3M
- Shima Shima Tora no Shimajirō, Dot
- Slayers, Zangulus
- Sonic X, Bocoe, Chuck Thorndyke
- Space Runaway Ideon, Gyabarī Tekuno
- Spiral: Suiri no Kizuna, Suemaru Wataya
- Super Dimension Cavalry Southern Cross, Charles de Etouard
- Time Bokan 2000: Kaitou Kiramekiman, (小徳川伊衛康)
- Uchūsen Sagittarius, Toppī
- Ultimate Muscle II, Barrier-Free Man J, Dazzle
- Wild Knights Gulkeeva, Dansu
- Yaiba, Kenjuro
- Yokoyama Mitsuteru Sangokushi, Sonken, Teiiku
- Yōyō no Neko Tsumami, Doc
- Yu-Gi-Oh! Duel Monsters GX, Gravekeeper's Chief
- Zettai Muteki Raijin-Oh, Tsutomu Kojima, Erudoran

=== Original Video Animation (OVA) ===
- Wicked City (1987), Airport Demon, Mr. Shadow's Thugs
- Crying Freeman (1988), Tsunaike
- Macross II (1992), Nexx
- Kishin Heidan (1993), Masatomo Sakaki
- You're Under Arrest (1994), Ken Nakajima
- Konpeki no Kantai (1998), Mototoki Hara, Naruto Kanchō
- Master Keaton (1998), Edgar Fisher

Unknown date

- B't X Neo, B't Halloween
- Detective Conan: Conan vs. Kidd vs. Yaiba: Hōtō Sōdatsu Daikessen!!, Kenjūrō Kurogane
- Future GPX Cyber Formula series, Jackie Gudelhian
- Kyokujitsu no Kantai, Tatsu Haramoto
- Mobile Suit Gundam 0080: War in the Pocket, Gabriel Ramirez Garcia
- Riki-Oh: The Wall of Hell, Riki-Oh Saiga
- Riki-Oh: Child of Destruction, Riki-Oh Saiga
- Saint Seiya Hades Chapter Sanctuary, Frog Zelos
- Tales of Symphonia, Rodyle – replaced Takeshi Aono

=== Theatrical Animation ===
- Urusei Yatsura 4: Lum the Forever (1986), Tobimaro Mizunokoji
- Dragon Ball Z: Broly – The Legendary Super Saiyan (1993), Broly
- Dragon Ball Z: Broly – Second Coming (1994), Broly
- Dragon Ball Z: Bio-Broly (1994), Bio-Broly
- Go! Go! Ackman (1994), Gordon
- Dragon Ball: The Path to Power (1996), General Blue
- You're Under Arrest: The Movie (1999), Ken Nakajima
- Asura (2012), Gisuke
- Yo-kai Watch Shadowside: Oni-ō no Fukkatsu (2017), Medama-Oyaji
- Mazinger Z (2018), Professors Nossori
- Dragon Ball Super: Broly (2018), Broly
- Drifting Home (2022), Yasuji Kumagaya
- Dragon Ball Super: Super Hero (2022), Broly
- One Piece Film: Red (2022), Monster

Unknown date

- Doraemon: Nobita and the Legend of the Sun King, Ketsuaru
- Doraemon: Nobita and the Robot Kingdom, Gonsuke
- Doraemon: Nobita in the Wan-Nyan Spacetime Odyssey, Secretary
- Doraemon: Nobita and the Winged Braves, Gūsuke's dad
- Dragon Ball: The Path to Power, General Blue
- One Piece: Episode of Chopper Plus: Bloom in the Winter, Miracle Sakura, Wapol
- Ultimate Muscle II, Dazzle
- Zeta Gundam A New Translation: Heirs to the Stars, Paptimus Scirocco
- Zeta Gundam A New Translation II: Lovers, Paptimus Scirocco
- Zeta Gundam A New Translation III: Love is the Pulse of the Stars, Paptimus Scirocco

=== Video games ===
- Street Fighter II (1991), Ryu
- Dead or Alive (1996), Zack
- Dead or Alive 2 (1999), Zack
- You're Under Arrest (2001, PlayStation), Ken Nakajima
- Dead or Alive 3 (2001), Zack
- Dead or Alive Xtreme Beach Volleyball (2003), Zack
- The King of Fighters: Maximum Impact (2004), Hyena
- Bōkoku no Aegis 2035: Warship Gunner (2005), Hiroshi Asao
- Dead or Alive 4 (2005), Zack
- KOF: Maximum Impact 2 (2006), Hyena
- Dead or Alive Xtreme 2 (2006), Zack
- Dead or Alive: Paradise (2010), Zack
- Dead or Alive: Dimensions (2011), Zack
- Dead or Alive 5 (2012), Zack
- Dead or Alive 6 (2019), Zack
- Xenoblade Chronicles 3: Future Redeemed (2023), Ghondor
- Persona 3 Reload (2024), President Tanaka, Igor

Unknown date

- Angelique: Sacria of Light and Darkness, Clavis, Guardian of Darkness
- Angelique: Tokimeki Treasure Chest, Clavis, Guardian of Darkness
- CR Hokuto no Ken Denshō (pachinko), Yuda
- CR Hokuto no Ken Tomo (pachinko), Yuda
- Dragon Ball Z video games (Budokai 3, Tenkaichi, Tenkaichi 2 and Tenkaichi 3), Broly
- Future GPX Cyber Formula series, Jacky Guderian, Akira Hiyoshi
- The Legend of Heroes III: Prophecy of the Moonlight Witch (Sega Saturn), Rōdi
- Kessen II, Cao Ren, Cheng Yu
- One Piece Grand Battle! 2, Wapol
- Policenauts, Dave Forrest
- Project Justice, Kurow Kirishima
- Summon Night Craft Sword Monogatari: Hajimari no Ishi, Enge
- Super Robot Wars series, Paptimus Scirocco, Nie Gihren, Anton Rando, Chai Char, Karl Gainer, 1st Lt. Zin, Gabriel Ramirez Garcia, Enemy Soldier, Kalo-Ran
- Tales of Legendia, Soron
- Tales of the World: Radiant Mythology, Widdershin
- Tales of Innocence, Oswald fan Kuruela
- Klonoa, Joka
- Infamous 2 (Japanese dub), Zeke Dunbar
- Tokyo Afterschool Summoners, Kurogane Kajiya

=== Tokusatsu ===
- Skyrider (1979-1980), Kamen Rider 2 (27 - 28, 52 - 54), Kamen Rider V3 (ep. 23, 27 - 28, 54)
- Skyrider Movie (1980) , Kamen Rider 2, Kamen Rider Stronger
- Kamen Rider Super-1 Movie (1981), Kamen Rider 2
- Birth of the 10th! Kamen Riders All Together!! (1984), Kamen Rider Stronger
- Ultra Super Fight (1994), Narrator, Ultraman (ep. 1, 3, 5, 13), Alien Baltan (ep. 1), Ultraman Ace (ep. 2, 4 - 5, 12), Astromons (ep. 2, 4, 12), Eleking (ep. 2, 4), Bemster (ep. 2, 4, 8), Kemur Man, Alien Godra (ep. 4, 8) Delusion Ultraseven (ep. 5), Astra (ep. 6), Ultraman Leo (ep. 6, 12), Alien Pegassa (ep. 7, 10, 15), Alien Metron (ep. 7, 14), Ultraman Taro (ep. 8, 10, 15), Ultraseven (ep. 9, 11), Zetton (ep. 9, 11), Reconstructed Pandon (ep. 10, 12), Pandon (ep. 14), Woo (ep. 15)
- Hyakujuu Sentai GaoRanger (2001), Tire Org (ep. 5)
- Ninpu Sentai Hurricanger (2002-2003), Sixth Spear Satarakura (eps. 21 - 49, 51) (Voice), TV Announcer (ep. 50) (Actor)
  - Ninpu Sentai Hurricanger: Shushutto the Movie (2002), Sixth Spear Satorakura
  - Ninpu Sentai Hurricanger vs. Gaoranger (2003), Sixth Spear Satorakura
- Tokusou Sentai Dekaranger (2004), Barisian Alpacic (ep. 24), Pyrian Korachek (ep. 40)
- Kamen Rider Hibiki Hyper Video (2005), Azure Wolf
- GoGo Sentai Boukenger (2006), Wicked Dragon Talong (ep. 27)
- Juken Sentai Gekiranger (2007), Confrontation Beast Baboon-Fist Hihi (ep. 24 - 25)
- Engine Sentai Go-onger (2009), Danger Cabinet-Director Chirakasonne (ep. 47)
- Samurai Sentai Shinkenger: The Light Samurai's Surprise Transformation (2010), Nanashi/Super Nanashi
- Tensou Sentai Goseiger: Epic on the Movie (2010), Desaopuda Alien Deinbaruto of the Morning Star
- Kaizoku Sentai Gokaiger (2011), Satorakura Jr. (ep. 25 - 26)
- Kamen Rider Gavv (2025), Zomb Stomach

=== CD drama ===
- Haiyore! Nyarko-san (2009), Nodens

Unknown date

- Future GPX Cyber Formula series, Jacky Guderian
- Mirage of Blaze series 2: Saiai no Anata he, Narimasa Sassa
- Samurai Spirits (Dengeki CD Bunko), Haōmaru
- Street Fighter II: Shunrei Hishō Densetsu (Toshiba-EMI), Ryū
- Nanaka 6/17, Jinpachi Arashiyama

=== Live action voice over ===
- Mark Hamill
  - Star Wars Episode IV: A New Hope (Luke Skywalker)
  - Star Wars Episode V: The Empire Strikes Back (Luke Skywalker)
  - Star Wars Episode VI: Return of the Jedi (Luke Skywalker)
  - Star Wars: The Force Awakens (Luke Skywalker)
  - Star Wars: The Last Jedi (Luke Skywalker)
  - Brigsby Bear (Ted Mitchum)
  - Child's Play (Chucky)
  - Star Wars: The Rise of Skywalker (Luke Skywalker)
- Steve Carell
  - The 40-Year-Old Virgin (Andy Stitzer)
  - Evan Almighty (Evan Baxter)
  - Crazy, Stupid, Love. (Cal Weaver)
  - Seeking a Friend for the End of the World (Dodge Petersen)
  - The Way, Way Back (Trent)
  - Battle of the Sexes (Bobby Riggs)
  - Space Force (General Mark R. Naird)
- The Adventures of Pluto Nash, Felix Laranga (Luis Guzmán)
- Batman Forever, Edward E. Nygma/The Riddler (Jim Carrey)
- Bill & Ted's Bogus Journey, Bill S. Preston (Alex Winter)
- Cool Runnings, Sanka Coffie (Doug E. Doug)
- The Fan, Manny (John Leguizamo)
- Indiana Jones and the Temple of Doom, Kao Kan (Ric Young)
- Out of Sight, Chino (Luis Guzmán)
- Pee-wee's Big Adventure, Pee-wee Herman (Paul Reubens)
- Private School (1984 Fuji TV edition), Bubba Beauregard (Michael Zorek)
- Red Dawn, Daryl Bates (Darren Dalton)
- The Replacement Killers, Stan "Zeedo" Zedkov (Michael Rooker)
- Sniper (additional recording part), Thomas Beckett (Tom Berenger)
- Super Mario Bros. (1994 NTV edition), Luigi (John Leguizamo)
- The Three Stooges, Curly Howard (Will Sasso)
- Tucker: The Man and His Dream, Alex Tremulis (Elias Koteas)

=== Animation voice over ===
- All Dogs Go to Heaven as Itchy Itchiford (Dom Deluise)
