= Chieko Honda =

Japanese actress

- 本多 知恵子
- Born: March 28, 1963; Tokyo, Japan
- Died: February 18, 2013 (aged 49)
- Occupations: Actress; voice actress
- Years active: 1983–2013
- Agent: Aoni Production
- Height: 144 cm (4 ft 9 in)

Chieko Honda (本多 知恵子, Honda Chieko; 28 March 1963 – 18 February 2013) was a Japanese actress and voice actress. During her life, she was attached to Tokyo Actor's Consumer's Cooperative Society and Mix Max; she was attached to Aoni Production at the time of her death. On 18 February 2013, Honda died of multiple forms of cancer while undergoing treatment.

== Filmography ==
=== Television animation ===
- Heavy Metal L-Gaim (1984) (Amu Fanneria)
- Bosco Adventure (1986) (Araiguma)
- Doteraman (1986) (Yukari)
- Dragon Ball (1986) (Pochawompa)
- Ganbare, Kickers! (1986) (Ayumi Daichi)
- Mobile Suit Gundam ZZ (1986) (Elpeo Ple, Ple Two)
- Kimagure Orange Road (1987) (Kurumi Kasuga)
- Himitsu no Akko-chan (1988) (Tsukiko Takeno)
- Kiteretsu Daihyakka (1988) (Miyoko Nonoka, Omiyo)
- The Burning Wild Man (1988) (Yukie Kokuhō)
- Time Travel Tondekeman (1989) (Tanya)
- Robin Hood no Daiboken (1990) (Cleo)
- Kyatto Ninden Teyandee (1991) (Okara)
- Soreike! Anpanman (1991) (Tsurarachan)
- YuYu Hakusho (1992) (Misako)
- Floral Magician Mary Bell (1992) (Mary Bell)
- Sailor Moon S (1994) (Tellu)
- Akazukin Chacha (1994) (Teacher Mayachon)
- Cho Kuse ni Nariso (1994) (Momoko)
- The Legend of Snow White (1994) (Cathy)
- Nurse Angel Ririka SOS (1995) (Ms. Kimizuka)
- Wedding Peach (1995) (Noiizu)
- After War Gundam X (1996) (Ennil El)
- Jigoku Sensei Nūbē (1996) (Izuna Hazuki)
- Mobile Suit Gundam: The 08th MS Team (1996) (Cynthia)
- Rurouni Kenshin (1996) (Azusa)
- Detective Conan (1997) (Akane Isaka, Akiko Sayama, Kinoshita (young))
- Flame of Recca (1997) (Mikoto)
- Shōjo Kakumei Utena (1997) (Kozue Kaoru)
- Cyber Team in Akihabara (1998) (Jun Goutokuji/Blood Falcon)
- Corrector Yui (1999) (Manami Sayama)
- Princess Comet (2001) (Meteor)
- Let's Ask Dr. Rin! (2001) (Azusa)
- Full Moon o Sagashite (2002) (Meroko Yui)
- Mermaid Forest (2003) (Yukie)
- Mermaid Melody Pichi Pichi Pitch (2003) (Yūri)
- Grenadier - The Senshi of Smiles (2004) (Tenshi)
- Oh My Goddess! (2005) (Chieko Honda)
- To Heart 2 (2005) (Haruka Yuzuhara)
- Pocket Monsters Diamond & Pearl (2007) (Gardenia)
- Katekyo Hitman Reborn! (2008) (Yoka Iris)
- Penguin Musume Heart (2008) (Black Rose)
- Rosario + Vampire Capu2 (2008) (Ageha Kurono)
- Soul Eater (2008) (Marie Mjolnir)

=== Original video animation ===
- Gall Force (1986) (Amy)
- Dead Heat (1987) (Kaori)
- Battle Royal High School (1987) (Kei Kobayashi)
- Dragon Century (1988) (Rulishia)
- Hades Project Zeorymer (1988) (Miku Himuro)
- Violence Jack Evil Town (1988) (Tom Cat)
- Riding Bean (1989) (Chelsea)
- Devil Hunter Yohko (1990) (Chikako Ogawa)
- 1+2=Paradise (1990) (Rika Nakamura)
- Yagami-kun no Katei no Jijō (1990) (Nomi Yagami)
- Here is Greenwood (1991) (Miya Igarashi)
- Madara (1991) (Kirin)
- Black Jack (1993) (Romi)
- Compiler (1994) (Plasma)
- Tekkaman Blade II (1994) (Natasha Pablochiva/Tekkaman Vesna)

=== Theatrical animation ===
- Lady Lady!! (1987) (Sarah Frances Russell)
- Mobile Suit SD Gundam (1988) (Elpeo Ple)
- Silent Möbius (1991) (Nami Yamigumo)
- Kochira Katsushika-ku Kameari Kōen-mae Hashutsujo: The Movie 2: UFO Shūrai! Tornado Daisakusen!! (2003) (Cathy)
- Detective Conan: The Lost Ship in the Sky (2010) (Chiaki Ōta)

=== Video games ===
- Jigoku Sensei Nūbē (1997) (Izuna Hazuki)
- EVE ZERO (2000) (Yayoi Katsuragi)
- EVE New Generation (2006) (Yayoi Katsuragi)
- Wrestle Angels Survivor (2006) (Hikaru Ogawa, Shizuka Yajima)
- Vanquish (2010) (Elena Ivanova)
- Pachislot To Heart 2 (2012) (Haruka Yuzuhara)

=== Dubbing roles ===
==== Animation ====
- The Legend of Tarzan (Queen La)
