= Schell Bullet =

Japanese science fiction novel series

- Cover to Schell Bullet: Aden Arabie.
- Schell Bullet: Aden Arabie; Schell Bullet: Abraxas
- Author: Kunihiko Ikuhara
- Original title: シェルブリット
- Illustrator: Mamoru Nagano
- Country: Japan
- Language: Japanese
- Genre: Science fiction, mecha
- Publisher: Kadokawa Shoten
- Published: 1999—2000

Schell Bullet (Japanese: シェルブリット) is a series by Kunihiko Ikuhara. It is composed of a two-volume novel by Ikuhara with artwork by Mamoru Nagano, and Schell Bullet: Thanaphs 68 (Japanese: Schell⋮Bullet サナフス68), a concept album composed by Tenpei Sato with vocals from Ikuhara and Maria Kawamura.

== Synopsis ==
As a result of gene manipulation, society is segregated by genes into "Majors" – intersex humans who maintain a monopoly on stronger genetic material – and lesser dual-sex "Minors". (Ikuhara stated that he chose to make the Majors intersex because he wished to create "a race which combines the good parts of both women and men.") Protagonist Ors Break is hired by the intergalactic trading company Balt Liner Corporation to pilot a schell, a bio-organic mecha, by claiming to be a Major. When the truth of his Minor status is revealed, he comes to an agreement with his superior, a Major named Delbee Ibus, to continue working for the organization.

== Production ==
Schell Bullet was published by Ikuhara following the release of Adolescence of Utena, the film sequel to the anime series Revolutionary Girl Utena, and shortly prior to his relocation from Tokyo to Los Angeles. The novel was Ikuhara's first project released during his twelve-year hiatus from directing anime, which spanned from the conclusion of Utena in 1999 to the release of Penguindrum in 2011. Ikuhara and Nagano promoted the novel at an event held by Newtype by cosplaying as characters Sailor Mars and Sailor Venus from the TV series Sailor Moon, of which Ikuhara was a director and series director.

Though Ikuhara stated that he received offers to adapt the novel into an anime, an anime adaptation never transpired.

== Media ==
=== Novel ===
Schell Bullet was published by Kadokawa Shoten. The novel was released in two volumes: Aden Arabie, published in 1999, and Abraxas, published in 2000. The novels include illustrations by Nakano of the novel's characters and settings, as well as diagrams of the schells.

No.	Title	Japanese release date	Japanese ISBN
1	Schell Bullet: Aden Arabie	September 1, 1999	978-4048530910
2	Schell Bullet: Abraxas	July 1, 2000	978-4048531290

=== Album ===
Schell Bullet: Thanaphs 68

Soundtrack album by Kunihiko Ikuhara
- Released: July 21, 2000
- Length: 52:40
- Label: Starchild Records
- Producer: Tenpei Sato

A concept album for the novel, Schell Bullet: Thanaphs 68 (Schell⋮Bullet サナフス68), was composed by Tenpei Sato, and features vocals from Ikuhara and Maria Kawamura. The liner notes for the album famously feature a photograph of Ikuhara wearing a leather bodysuit with a spiked corset.
