= Ganbare, Kickers! =

Manga series

- First tankōbon volume cover, featuring Kakeru Daichi

がんばれ!キッカーズ (Ganbare! Kikkāzu)
- Genre: Sport, Comedy, Drama
- Manga
- Written by: Noriaki Nagai
- Published by: Shogakukan
- Magazine: CoroCoro Comic
- Original run: November 1984 – March 1989
- Volumes: 20
- Anime television series
- Directed by: Akira Shigino
- Produced by: Haruhiko Akamine; Kunitaka Okada; Takaichi Matsumoto; Yuji Nunokawa (Executive producer)
- Written by: Sukehiro Tomita; Hiroshi Kaneko; Isao Shizutani; Mitsuo Aimono
- Music by: Jun Irie
- Studio: Studio Pierrot
- Original network: NNS (NTV)
- Original run: October 15, 1986 – January 5, 1988
- Episodes: 26 + OVA

Ganbare, Kickers! (Japanese: がんばれ!キッカーズ, Hepburn: Ganbare! Kikkāzu; transl. Fight! Kickers) is a soccer kid manga by Noriaki Nagai. It was published by Shogakukan in CoroCoro Comic magazine from 1985 to 1989 and collected into 20 volumes.

The manga was turned into an anime series by Studio Pierrot in 1986–1988. It consists of 26 episodes and one OVA, but only 23 episodes aired in Japan during the initial broadcast from October 1986 to March 1987, and the last three instead aired as a TV special in January 1988. In 1988 the anime arrived to EMEA in its dubbed version and had some success in the Middle East (الهداف Al Haddaf), Iran (فوتبالیست‌ها), South Korea (내일은 축구왕), Italy (Palla al centro per Rudy), Portugal in 1994–1995 by RTP Canal1 (O Ponta de Lança), Spain (Supergol), France (But Pour Rudy), Poland (Piłkarze) and especially in Germany and Austria (Kickers). In Malaysia, the anime was aired on TV1 RTM in 1990s, Awesome TV in 2020. In Indonesia, the anime was aired on Indosiar in 1995–1997, TPI in 2003, Bali TV in 2005.

== Story ==
The story is about an enthusiastic kid soccer team at the Kitahara elementary school, who struggle without a competent striker, when little Kakeru Daichi's (大地翔 Daichi Kakeru) family moves into the town. He immediately applies to join the team, keen to use his skills gained in the kid team of famous soccer club "The Falcons". With Kakeru the team becomes complete in every sense and he motivates the team to challenge the "Red Devils", a strong secondary school team whose goalkeeper Uesugi is considered undefeatable. They lose 10 to 1, but Kakeru's scoring a single goal is still a small miracle. Under the strong leadership of their own goalkeeper Masaru Hongo, Kickers then enter the kid championship and fight their way up through hard won victories. Meanwhile, Hongo falls in love with Ayumi Daichi (大地歩 Daichi Ayumi), Kakeru's cute, sporty sister. In turn the striker enamours Akuna Yukie, a fragile, angelic pianist girl, who happens to be Uesugi's much younger sister. These affairs lead to some embarrassingly funny situations as well as numerous complications with the team's devoted and jealous cheerleader trio.

For a short while, Kickers gain a professional trainer whose instructions help them win their way to the semi-finals, just to meet the Red Devils once again. After a dramatic match, that spans two 20 minute episodes, Uesugi fends off Kakeru's final freescore and so the Kickers are out! The devastated team is soon divided by the arrival of Harry, a famous junior talent, who has been fired from three big name teams already for subversive behaviour. He infiltrates and splits Kickers, but his rudeness and Hongo's strong leadership re-unite the team. Harry then seduces Ayumi and assembles a faux team out of the school's scum so he can defeat the Kickers almost alone. Although the naive Kakeru is no match for the older and much stronger Harry, the Kickers's teamwork spirit and Uesugi's support secures a victory in this dirty match and Harry is devastated. The anime series ends with a redeemed Harry reconciling with the Kickers, before leaving the town to play overseas.

== Crew ==
Original story: Noriaki Nagai
Series Director: Akira Shigino
Series Composition: Sukehiro Tomita
Script: Hiroshi Kaneko, Isao Shizutani, Mitsuo Aimono, Sukehiro Tomita
Episode Director: Akira Shigino, Harumi Tamano, Kazu Yokota, Minoru Shinbayashi, Roku Iwata, Shigeru Morikawa
Storyboard: Akira Shigino, Harumi Tamano, Kazu Yokota, Makoto Moriwaki, Minoru Shinbayashi, Roku Iwata, Shigeru Morikawa, Takayuki Kaneko
Art Director: Satoshi Miura
Art design: Masahiro Sato
Character Design: Takeshi Ozaka
Animation Director: Takeshi Ozaka, Katsuichi Nakayama, Masami Shimoda, Mitsuo Shindo, Takafumi Hayashi
Composer: Jun Irie
Director of Photography: Hitoshi Kaneko
Editing: Masanori Sakamoto
Sound Director: Naoko Asari
Sound Effects: Kazutoshi Sato
Production manager: Reiko Fukakusa
Producer: Haruhiko Akamine (NTV), Kunitaka Okada (I&S), Takaichi Matsumoto (Pierrot)
Executive producer: Yuji Nunokawa

== Voice actors ==
Tomiko Suzuki - Kakeru Daichi
Yuko Kobayashi - Akuna Yukie
Ikue Ohtani - Kiyoshi Hara
Kazue Ikura - Masaru Hongō
Tarako - Taichi
Michie Tomizawa - Tetsuya
Urara Takano - Mamoru
Eiko Hisamura - Hikaru Uesugi
Chieko Honda - Ayumi Daichi

== Episode list ==
No.	Title	Original release date
1	"Hara! Is This Really the Soccer Club?"; Transliteration: "Harā! Hontoni Kore ga Sakkā-bu?" (Japanese: はらァー！ほんとにこれがサッカー部？)	October 15, 1986
2	"Taichi Guz Saved the Onboro Team!"; Transliteration: "Guzu no Taichi ga Onboro Chīmu o Sukutta!" (Japanese: グズの太一がオンボロチームを救った！)	October 22, 1986
3	"Stop Deco and Soccer!"; Transliteration: "Deko, Sakkā Nante Yamete Shimae!" (Japanese: デコ、サッカーなんてやめてしまえ！)	October 29, 1986
4	"Confrontation with That Uesugi! Nanyo Match Kick-off!!"; Transliteration: "Ano Uesugi to Taiketsu da! Nan'yō-sen Kikkuofu!!" (Japanese: あの上杉と対決だ！南陽戦キックオフ！！)	November 5, 1986
5	"I Won't Give Up! I'll Definitely Get One Point!"; Transliteration: "Akirame nai zo! Zettai 1-ten Totte Yaru!" (Japanese: あきらめないぞ！絶対1点とってやる！)	November 12, 1986
6	"It is a Such a Fool! Is the Captain Naughty?"; Transliteration: "Son'na Baka na! Kyaputen wa Etchi da?" (Japanese: そんなバカな！キャプテンはエッチだ？)	November 19, 1986
7	"Get it! Friendship Soccer Ball Flying in the Sky"; Transliteration: "Todoke! Sora ni Mau Yūjō no Sakkā Bōru" (Japanese: とどけ！空に舞う友情のサッカーボール)	November 26, 1986
8	"Hara, Kenta-kun's Phantom Super Shoot"; Transliteration: "Harā, Kenta-kun no Maboroshi no Sūpā Shūto" (Japanese: はらァー、健太君の幻のスーパーシュート)	December 3, 1986
9	"A Big Pinch! Kickers Who Can't Kick the Ball"; Transliteration: "Dai Pinchi! Bōru no Kerenai Kikkāzu" (Japanese: 大ピンチ！ボールのけれないキッカーズ)	December 10, 1986
10	"Eh Kenta and Deco Leave! Struggling with Rough Play"; Transliteration: "Etsu Kenta to Deko Taijō! Rafu Purē ni Kusen" (Japanese: えっ健太とデコ退場！ラフプレーに苦戦)	December 17, 1986
11	"Opposition to Marriage!? A Strange Challenge Letter Received by Mamoru"; Transliteration: "Kekkon Hantai!? Mamoru-kun ga Uketa Hen'na Chōsen-jō" (Japanese: 結婚反対！？守くんがうけたヘンな挑戦状)	January 7, 1987
12	"Both Gaku and Akina Won the Championship! Kickers Cheer"; Transliteration: "Gaku mo Akina mo Yūshōda! Kikkāzu ga Ōen-dan" (Japanese: 学も明菜も優勝だ！キッカーズが応援団)	January 14, 1987
13	"Blow Off Computer Soccer!"; Transliteration: "Konpyūtā Sakkā o Buttobase!" (Japanese: コンピューターサッカーをぶっとばせ！)	January 21, 1987
14	"Don't be Stupid! Decide on a Double-Speed Shoot!!"; Transliteration: "Baka ni Suru na! Baisoku Shūto o Kimero!!" (Japanese: バカにするな！倍速シュートを決めろ！！)	January 28, 1987
15	"Tetsuya's Special Dish! Feeling is Kickers Detective Team"; Transliteration: "Tetsuya no Tokudane! Kibun wa Kikkāzu Tantei-dan" (Japanese: 哲也の特ダネ！気分はキッカーズ探偵団)	August 26, 1987
16	"Get It! A Ridiculous Coach has Arrived"; Transliteration: "Getsu! Tondemonai Kōchi ga Yatteki ta" (Japanese: ゲッ！とんでもないコーチがやって来た)	February 4, 1987
17	"Kickers' Big Mom Valentine's Day!"; Transliteration: "Kikkāzu no Dai Mome Barentain Dē!" (Japanese: キッカーズの大もめバレンタインデー！)	February 11, 1987
18	"What's Wrong? Coach Who Left During the Match"; Transliteration: "Dō Shita no? Shiai-chū ni Tachisatta Kōchi" (Japanese: どうしたの？試合中に立ち去ったコーチ)	February 18, 1987
19	"It's an Official Game! But I Had a Problem with the Baseball Club"; Transliteration: "Sā Kōshiki-senda! Demo Nodamabu to Torabu tta" (Japanese: さあ公式戦だ！でも野球部とトラブった)	February 25, 1987
20	"I found it! White? Eightback Weaknesses"; Transliteration: "Mitsuketa zo! Shiro? Eito Bakku no Jakuten" (Japanese: 見つけたぞ！白？エイトバックの弱点)	March 3, 1987
21	"A Mysterious Team Appears! Is the Second Game a Big Battle?"; Transliteration: "Nazo no Chīmu Shutsugen! Dai 2 Shiai wa Dai Ransen?" (Japanese: ナゾのチーム出現！第2試合は大乱戦？)	March 11, 1987
22	"GO! A Fierce Battle with Rival Uesugi has Begun"; Transliteration: "GO! Raibaru Uesugi to no Nettō ga Hajimatta" (Japanese: GO！ライバル上杉との熱闘が始まった)	March 18, 1987
23	"You are a Shooting Star! Burn Kickers"; Transliteration: "Kimi wa Nagareboshi! Moetsukiro Kikkāzu" (Japanese: 君は流れ星！燃えつきろキッカーズ)	March 25, 1987
OVA	"Our Legend"; Transliteration: "Bokutachi no Densetsu" (Japanese: ぼくたちの伝説)	August 21, 1987
24	"Alone Ace Striker"; Transliteration: "Hitori Botchi no Ēsu Sutoraikā" (Japanese: ひとりぼっちのエースストライカー)	January 5, 1988
25	"The Mystery of the Red Rose Given to Ayumi"; Transliteration: "Ayumu-chan ni Okura Reta Akai Bara no Nazo" (Japanese: 歩ちゃんに贈られた赤いバラのなぞ)	January 5, 1988
26	"Defeat the Outlaw Group, the Jackals!"; Transliteration: "Autorō Shūdan Jakkaruzu o Taose!" (Japanese: アウトロー集団ジャッカルズを倒せ！)	January 5, 1988
