= List of Heavy Metal L-Gaim characters =

This is an index of characters in the anime Heavy Metal L-Gaim.

== Rebellion ==
=== Daba Myroad ===
Daba Myroad (Real name: Kamon Myroad) is the main character of Heavy Metal L-Gaim. Prince of the Yaman Clan, a monarchy of the planet Mizum that was completely wiped out in Poseidal's conquest, Daba seeks revenge on Poseidal and seeks to restore the Yaman Clan to its former glory. He pilots the powerful white Heavy Metal, the L-Gaim, and later on, the L-Gaim Mk-II. Daba grows to be a model leader over the course of the series and unites factions from multiple planets in an attempt to defeat Poseidal once and for all. Daba's one big weakness is that he gets too reckless when his adopted sister, Quwasan Olibee gets involved in the war. Voiced by Hirokazu Hiramatsu.

=== Mirawoo Kyao ===
Daba's childhood friend who travels along with him from the very beginning. A rather goofy character, Kyao can never make up his mind and has a short lived dream of joining the Poseidal military. He's a good friend to Daba and pilots a number of Heavy Metals including the L-Gaim, D-Sserd and Lista. Voiced by Houchu Ohtsuka.

=== Fanaria Amm ===
Amm, a former actress who turned to a life of crime by joining a group of bandits meets Daba and Kyao in the wastelands of Koam and immediately leaves the bandits and teams up with them. She immediately falls in love with Daba. Amm doesn't have much talent, but has a lot of dedication to Daba and works as hard as she can over the course of the series at increasing her skills. She eventually captains the space shuttle Turner and takes over the L-Gaim once Daba obtains the Mk-II. Amm's nemesis is Gaw Ha Leccee as both are vying for Daba's love and they constantly get into fights over not just him, but many other reasons as well. Voiced by Chieko Honda.

=== Gaw Ha Leccee ===
A trainee for the Elite 13, Leccee initially meets Daba when he steals a ship on Koam and she is brought along. Leccee falls in love with Daba and defects from the military to join him. A skilled and experienced pilot, she is a powerful ally although she and Amu don't get along, often fighting over Daba. Leccee eventually gets upset with the rebels' progress and leaves them to become a member of Amandara Kamandara's private army. She eventually returns to the rebellion as the captain of the space shuttle Whale. Voiced by Maria Kawamura.

=== Lillith Fuau ===
The last remaining fairy in the Pentagona World, Lillith is found by Daba in the city of Prearmo, on Koam. She immediately joins up with our heroes and while she isn't much help in battle, she's a good cook and loyal colleague. Lillith shares character design and voice actor (Maria Kawamura) with Cham Fau from, Aura Battler Dunbine an earlier Tomino/Sunrise series.

=== Semuj Shato ===
A rebel leader on Trydetol who joins up with Daba and the others. Semuj is a good ally to Daba and is able to secure a large amount of supplies from Amandara Kamandara and other factions. It is eventually revealed that he is a spy for Full Flat, but Daba decides to forgive him and keep him aboard. Voiced by Tesshō Genda.

=== Stella Coban ===
Leader of the rebels on the planet Mizum. Stella and Daba ally with each other due to their desires to topple Poseidal, but differ greatly on their views. In particular, Daba gets frustrated with Stella's habit of recklessly throwing sums of money to his subordinates, not to mention his multiple attempts to execute his own allies when he suspects them of disloyalty. Stella is eventually killed at his main base of Little Saye. Voiced by Masato Tachizawa.

== Poseidal Military ==
=== Oldna Poseidal ===
The legendary immortal emperor from the planet Gastogal that rules all of Pentagona. Poseidal is easily spotted by his white hair and mismatched eyes; one yellow, one blue. With the power of the bio-relation that harnesses biological energy, he has the ability to control the actions of others and lives forever. He is nearly invincible, particularly in his own Heavy Metal, the Original Auge. After defeating Kamon Walha V, cementing his status as ruler of Pentagona, Poseidal disappears from view, hiding as the wealthy trader Amandara Kamandara. As the battle between the rebellion and the military reaches its climax Poseidal returns to the forefront and battles Daba. He perishes when the bio-relation system that preserves his youth is deactivated, which was done by the woman who he had placed as both the controller of the system and his mouthpiece for the empire he made.

=== Amandara Kamandara ===
A wealthy trader who supplies both the military and the rebels with supplies. In actuality, Amandara Kamandara is the real Poseidal, hiding behind the scenes while a puppet is on the throne. A mysterious character throughout the show, Amandara's true intentions come to the surface at the end and he reveals his true persona, Oldna Poseidal. Voiced by Ryuichi Horibe.

=== Mian Ku Ha Attsher ===
One of Poseidal's former Temple Knights, Mian fell in love with him and eventually completely fell under his control due to the power of the bio-relation. While the bio-relation allowed her to live forever without aging, it also resulted in her becoming little more than a puppet and she was used to pose as Poseidal while he hid. Even she hid from public view for the most part, appearing rarely except as a hologram and wearing a bizarre costume complete with makeup and a wig. As the years passed however the bio-relation system's control slipped and Mian was able to think for herself, against Poseidal much in part due to encounters with Full Flat. Mian would eventually disable the bio-relation system in the heart of Sveto and, like him, age to her death.

=== Full Flat ===
Like Mian, Full Flat was one of Poseidal's former Temple Knights and was in love with him. Unlike Mian, Flat was unable to win Poseidal's love, but was given the independent asteroid base Theart Star due to all the help she provided him. Like Poseidal and Mian she possessed eternal youth, but as the decades passed she grew bored with her life and resentful towards Poseidal. Flat eventually seeks to take Poseidal down, first by allying with Giwaza Lowau, who was rebelling against Poseidal, and later heading down to Sveto herself to break Mian from Poseidal's grasp. It was during the second of these encounters where Flat's life came to an end when the L-Gaim Mk-II accidentally crushed her. Voiced by Mika Doi.

=== Gavlet Gablae ===
A pilot obsessed with joining the military who eventually gets his wish thanks to a recommendation from Amandara Kamandara. Gavlet becomes obsessed with Daba after a petty dispute over food and Lillith. He works his way through the military (eventually joining the Elite 13) and acquires powerful Heavy Metals but is never able to defeat Daba. Due to his success he is given command of the space ship Slender Skala. Gavlet eventually helps Daba and the rebels after becoming obsessed with Quwasan Olibee near the end of the show. Voiced by Sho Hayami.

=== Quwasan Olibee ===
Daba's younger adopted sister and fiance, whom he lost track of. She eventually reappears as a puppet of Poseidal on the spy ship Epsilon. She is promoted over Giwaza, upsetting him enough for him to rebel against Poseidal. This also makes her a target of him, and he eventually manages to kidnap her. Daba and Gavlet (who falls in love with her) eventually rescue Olibee and she assists in them finding Poseidal(Mian) in the heart of Sveto. Although the war eventually ends, Olibee is brain damaged by the anguish caused by the bio-relation that Poseidal used to control her. Voiced by Yumi Kinoshita.

=== Giwaza Lowau ===
Member of Poseidal's Elite 13 (No. 3). Despite his number, Giwaza is the head of the group, and outside of Poseidal is the highest-ranked member of the Poseidal military. Later in the series Poseidal decides to promote Olibee over him, which enrages him so much that he decides to rebel against Poseidal. He gathers a huge force including most of the Elite 13 and attacks Poseidal's capital at Sveto at the same time the rebels are. His forces are eventually wiped out and he is killed trying to escape from the battle. Voiced by Tomomichi Nishimura.

=== Nei Mo Han ===
Member of Poseidal's Elite 13 (No. 4). A vicious female pilot, and girlfriend of Giwaza. Nei is initially deployed to attack the rebels on Mizum with her wingmen Anton and Heckler. She eventually follows Daba and the others to Trydetol and back into space. She is sent to Sveto to try to prove Full Flat as a traitor, and is abandoned there. She is later sent back into space by Poseidal(Mian) to assassinate Giwaza, but this ends in failure and she is killed. Voiced by Harumi Takeuchi.

=== Chai Char ===
Member of Poseidal's Elite 13 (No. 5). Chai Char is charge of the planet Koam when Gavlet Gablae is placed under his command. Having never asked for this, Chai has disdain for not only Gavlet, but his superior Giwaza. His desire to prove himself in battle eventually becomes his downfall as he is killed by Kyao in a battle at the base Little Saye on the planet Mizum. Voiced by Bin Shimada.

=== Wassan Lune ===
Member of Poseidal's Elite 13 (No. 6). Wassan is in charge of the planet Mizum and attacks the rebels once they return there later in the series. He quickly befriends Gavlet and later teams up with Lily as well. An honorable veteran soldier, Wassan finds that Daba reminds him of his deceased son and later sacrifices himself to save Lily. Voiced by Ryuichi Horibe.

=== Ted Devilas ===
Member of Poseidal's Elite 13 (No. 7). Ted Devilas is one of the group that are loyal to Giwaza, and joins with him when he rebels against Poseidal. Devilas is initially given control of Trydetol then later joins up in the final assault on Sveto. It is unknown whether he survived the battle or not.

=== Maph McTomin ===
Member of Poseidal's Elite 13 (No. 8). McTomin is in charge of the asteroid fortress Palarta Star, although he ends up being absent when Daba and the others liberate it. He later appears to join up with Giwaza's rebellion against Poseidal. He is a powerful force in his A-Taul V, but is eventually defeated by Daba at Sveto. Voiced by Banjou Ginga.

=== Rockley Ron ===
Member of Poseidal's Elite 13 (No. 9). Rockley's loyalties are to Poseidal(Mian), who has given him the task of accompanying her puppet, Quwasan Olibee. Rockley is a cruel man and suspicious of all. He takes part in the final battle on Sveto piloting a Calvary Temple. His final fate is unknown. Voiced by Norio Wakamoto.

=== Lily Hasshi ===
Member of Poseidal's Elite 13 (No. 10). Lily is loyal to Giwaza, and joins him when he decides to rebel against Poseidal. Initially teaming up with Gavlet and Wassan to defeat the rebels on Mizum, she pursues them relentlessly across the Pentagona system until finally being killed while piloting her G.Roon in a battle with Amu near Gastogal. Voiced by Asami Mukaidono.

=== Barn Gania Killas ===
Member of Poseidal's Elite 13 (No. 11). Bran Gania is one of the group that is loyal to Giwaza, and joins with him when he rebels against Poseidal. He heads off with Ted Devilas to gather Giwaza's forces, then joins up with the final assault on Sveto. He is killed in a duel with Daba in the final episode while piloting an Asura Temple. Voiced by Shunsuke Takamiya.

=== Hans Arahart ===
Member of Poseidal's Elite 13 (No. 12). Hans is stationed at Sveto, and his loyalty is to Poseidal. He appears at the end of the series as Giwaza's forces attack Sveto and he battles Maph McTomin in his Calvary Temple. He later helps Poseidal(Mian) make her way to the Lachesis Shrine, where he dies.

=== Mahoul Senuhmah ===
Member of Poseidal's Elite 13 (No. 13). Mahoul is stationed at Sveto, and her loyalty is to Poseidal. One of the more minor characters, she appears at the very end of the series and helps Poseidal(Mian) make her way to the Lachesis Shrine, where she dies.

=== Sai Quo Addar ===
Member of Poseidal's Elite 13 (No. 1). Appears in the third L-Gaim OVA. Sai is Leccee's grandfather, but this doesn't stop him from trying attacking her and Daba when he gets the chance. Defeated by Daba in battle, Sai is released and he later fights Leccee but is prevented from killing her by Daba. Sai decides to retire from the Elite 13 and helps Daba and the others escape after their battle in the Bio-Base Zelda on Gastogal. Voiced by Hidekatsu Shibata.

=== Preita Quoize ===
Member of Poseidal's Elite 13 (No. 2). Appears in the third L-Gaim OVA. The bizarre looking Preita pilots the powerful Heavy Metal Pagorta, which he controls with an electronic keyboard stored in the cockpit. Preita manages to kidnap Leccee and holds her hostage in the Bio-Base Zelda on the planet Gastogal. He battles Daba, but is overwhelmed by his Heavy Metal's power after being defeated by Daba.

=== Anton Rando ===
One of Nei Mo Han's wingmen. After Nei heads down to Sveto, Anton stays by Giwaza's side aboard the Sarge Opus. A skilled pilot of the Bat-Shu, he is one of the few members of the military to survive and is taken captive by the rebels. Voiced by Bin Shimada.

=== Heckler Mauser ===
One of Nei Mo Han's wingmen. While Anton remains with Giwaza, Heckler leads a number of assaults against the rebels after Nei heads down to Sveto. He is a skilled pilot, but sacrifices his life to save Maph McTomin during the final battle. Voiced by Kouzou Shioya.
