= Gothicmade =

2012 film by Mamoru Nagano

- Genre: science fiction
- Created by: Mamoru Nagano
- Anime film
- Directed by: Mamoru Nagano
- Produced by: Ikuko Enomoto; Makoto Togashi
- Written by: Mamoru Nagano
- Music by: Seikou Nagaoka
- Studio: Automatic Flowers Studio; Kadokawa Daiei Studio
- Released: November 1, 2012
- Runtime: 70 minutes

Gothicmade (GOTHICMADE ゴティックメード-花の詩女-; lit. "Gothicmade -The Flower Maiden-") is a Japanese sci-fi/mecha anime film directed by Mamoru Nagano. The film debut in Japan on November 1, 2012. The lore of The Five Star Stories was retconned starting with volume 13 onwards to better match the movie lore. The movie did not receive home media releases and is only available to be watched in Japanese theaters via TOHO's Dreampass rerun system.

== Plot ==
Gothicmade describes a world, that consists of little colonies, named Carmine.

In this world, Songstresses are powerful young women who inherit the memories and knowledge of those who came before them. They then pursue the goal of liberating the populace suffering under the corrupt and ruling interplanetary league.

The story starts with the young Bellin Ajelli (16 y.o.) who has just been reborn as a Songstress and is determined to run a pilgrimage across the planet as she meets Prince Truhallon, willing to protect her against the regime, but his status describes the embodiment of that what Bellin is trying fighting against.

The story describes the struggles and development of those the characters as they travel alongside each other trying to reach the capital.

== Cast ==
- Maria Kawamura
- Nozomu Sasaki
- Kotono Mitsuishi
