= Mamoru Nagano =

Japanese manga artist (born 1960)

- Born: January 21, 1960 (age 66); Maizuru, Kyoto Prefecture, Japan
- Occupations: Manga artist, animator, mecha designer
- Spouse: Maria Kawamura

Mamoru Nagano (永野 護, Nagano Mamoru; born January 21, 1960) is a Japanese manga artist, animator, and mecha and character designer. Born in Maizuru, Kyoto Prefecture, he is noted for his work with anime studio Sunrise. He is married to voice actress Maria Kawamura.

== Career ==
Mamoru Nagano made his professional debut in 1984 working with Yoshiyuki Tomino on the TV series Heavy Metal L-Gaim. Fool for the City, his first manga, came out in 1985 but it was 1986 that brought The Five Star Stories, which is still in production today. Nagano founded Toys Press, Inc. to publish much of his work.

His work in Heavy Metal L-Gaim introducing mecha with armor plates that appeared to fit loosely over an internal skeleton. These detailed and somewhat plausible designs sparked a fresh wave of designs in mecha anime. From there, Nagano went on to design elegant and graceful mecha for his manga The Five Star Stories that displayed elongated lines, delicate curves and a degree of decoration and detail that appealed to the imaginations of a generation of mecha fans. Nagano can be called an innovator in the field of mecha design. He has also contributed to the mecha designs of Zeta Gundam. Among his contributions were the Rick Dias and Hyaku Shiki.

Nagano is also the co-author (along with Kunihiko Ikuhara) and illustrator of Schell Bullet, a novel in two volumes. Later, he has worked on the anime Gothicmade with studio Automatic Flowers as the producer, director, chief writer, character and mechanical designer for the series.

Nagano has been a professional artist, manga writer, musician and fashion designer. Some of his art books show him dressed up as Minako Aino from Sailor Moon for cosplay.

== Works ==
=== Manga ===
- Fool For the City - Story and art
- The Five Star Stories – Story and art

=== Anime ===
- All That Gundam – Mechanical design
- Brain Powered – Mecha design
- Delpower X Bakuhatsu Miracle Genki! – Character design
- The Five Star Stories – Original manga
- Giant Gorg – Mechanical Design
- Gundam Evolve – Mechanical design
- Gothicmade – Director, screenplay, storyboard, original creator, character design, key animation, layout, photography
- Heavy Metal L-Gaim – Character design
- Mobile Suit Zeta Gundam – Design
- Round Vernian Vifam – Mechanical Design

=== Video games ===
- Tekken 3 – Anna Williams's costume design
- Tekken Tag Tournament – Anna Williams's costume design
- Tekken 5 – Anna Williams's extra costume design
- Tekken 6 – Anna Williams and Asuka Kazama's costume design

=== Novels ===
- Schell Bullet – with Kunihiko Ikuhara
