= Eri Shingyōji =

Japanese singer

Eri Shingyōji (真行寺 恵里, Shingyōji Eri), born February 10, 1974, in Yokosuka, Kanagawa Prefecture, is a Japanese rock singer. IN MY DREAM, her first single, was featured as the opening theme of the anime Brain Powerd.

== Discography ==
=== Singles ===
- 05/21/1998 - IN MY DREAM
- 10/21/1998 - Ashita He No run away (明日へのrun away; "Run away to tomorrow")
- 05/21/1999 - Good Luck to You
- 11/20/1999 - Zettaizetsumei (絶体絶命; "Driven to the wall")
- 01/24/2001 - CRIME
- 2001 - gain
- 2001 - gain/grave
- 10/23/2002 - Boku Janakya (僕じゃなきゃ; "Without Me")

=== Albums ===
- 11/21/1998 - HARD VOLTAGE
- 01/21/2000 - Monkey on my back
- 02/21/2002 - POWER STRIP
