= The Five Star Stories =

Japanese comic book series

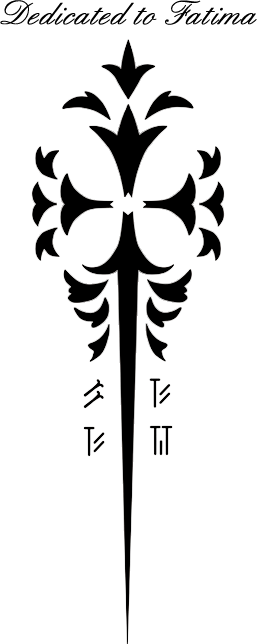
- Logo of "The Five Star Stories".

ファイブスター物語 (Faibu Sutā Monogatari)
- Genre: Space opera, mecha, science fiction
- Manga
- Written by: Mamoru Nagano
- Published by: Kadokawa Shoten
- English publisher: NA: Toyspress (former); Titan Publishing Group (current)
- Magazine: Newtype
- Original run: April 10, 1986 – present
- Volumes: 19
- Anime film
- Directed by: Kazuo Yamazaki
- Produced by: Haruki Kadokawa; Masuo Ueda
- Written by: Akinori Endo
- Music by: Tomoyuki Asakawa
- Studio: Sunrise
- Licensed by: NA: ADV Films
- Released: March 11, 1989
- Runtime: 66 minutes

The Five Star Stories (Japanese: ファイブスター物語, Hepburn: Faibu Sutā Monogatari) is a science fiction manga series created by Mamoru Nagano, building on his work on the anime series Heavy Metal L-Gaim. The story takes place in a cluster of four major planetary systems, and centers around Amaterasu, the immortal emperor of the Grees Kingdom who is destined to rule the whole Joker System, as well as his bride Lachesis. An anime film adaptation of the first volume, directed by Kazuo Yamazaki, was released in 1989.

== Overview ==
The Five Star Stories takes its name from the Joker Star Cluster where the stories take place. The star cluster is made up of four stars: Eastern, Western, Southern and Northern. The "fifth star" is a large comet named Stant that passes through that sector of space every 1,500 years pulling with it its own collection of orbiting planets.

In the distant past the Farus Di Kanon Empire, now commonly known as the "Super Empire", controlled all four solar systems of the Joker Cluster. They enjoyed a level of technology much higher than is currently known and sent explorers to the far reaches of the Joker Cluster. Around the year 9000 AD (Ammon Duul) the empire collapsed due to internal strife. The explorers were called home and what remained of civilization focused mainly on survival. Much technology and knowledge was lost by the time the imperial families of Amaterasu, Fillmore and Hathuha gathered and established the JC era. JC stands for "Joker Calendar" and was meant to give a common frame of reference to all nations to help foster a lasting peace. The JC calendar was adopted but the dream of peace was never realized.

The first story of The Five Star Stories begins in JC 2988. At this time interstellar travel is common and genetically engineered "fatimas" are well established as necessary co-pilots of the fearsome mortar heads that dominate the battlefields. Warfare between nations is commonplace and few still hope for peace.

Mortar headds are the combat mainstays of the Joker Universe. They are mecha which require superhuman reflexes and skill to control, and are therefore only utilized by headliners with Fatima copilots. Fatimas are humanoid creatures genetically engineered for a life of service on the battlefield. Fatimas are necessary copilots for mortar headds and mentally merge with the computer systems of these devastating machines to control weapons, communications and other vital processes. As such, Fatimas are designed to have computational skills rivaling any computer.

As of the 2013 May issue of Newtype, the setting of FSS has changed to fit the lore of Mamoru Nagano's 2012 film Gothicmade. MH (Mortar Headd) has been renamed GTM (GothicMade), while Fatimas have been renamed AF (Automatic Flowers).

== Media ==
=== Manga ===
Eighteen volumes of manga have been published beginning in 1986 and up until the present.

An English translation was published by Toyspress, a company cofounded by the author. Each volume of the English version contained approximately two-thirds of the equivalent Japanese volumes. To date, 26 volumes of the English version have been produced, covering Japanese volumes 1 through 10. Volume 11 and onward have yet to be translated.

On June 4th 2025, Titan Comics announced that they had licensed The Five Star Stories, with their first volume originally set to be released in March 2026. Following multiple delays, it is scheduled for December 1st of 2026. On November 12th 2026, Titan Comics announced they had placed a hold on distribution of their English release following concerns regarding the quality of the translation.

The major story arcs of the manga are:

Story Arc	Japanese Books	English Volumes
Destiny Three Fates: Lachesis	I	1–3
Destiny Three Fates: Clotho	II–III	4–8
Trafficks	IV–V	9–12
Destiny Three Fates: Atropos	VI–VIII	13–20
The Chivalries	IX–X	21–26
The Majestic Stand	XI–XVIII	Untranslated

==== Volumes ====
No.	Original release date	Original ISBN	English release date	English ISBN
1	May 5, 1987	978-4-04-8520614	December 1, 2026	978-1-78774-8361
2	June 20, 1988	978-4-04-8521079	March 23, 2027	978-1-78774-8903
3	July 31, 1990	978-4-04-8522755	July 20, 2027	978-1-78774-8910
4	September 4, 1991	978-4-04-8523110	—	—
5	October 29, 1992	978-4-04-8523677	—	—
6	March 3, 1994	978-4-04-8524681	—	—
7	April 24, 1995	978-4-04-8525596	—	—
8	February 26, 1997	978-4-04-8527743	—	—
9	September 24, 1998	978-4-04-8529570	—	—
10	September 28, 2000	978-4-04-8532495	—	—
11	April 17, 2003	978-4-04-8535694	—	—
12	April 5, 2006	978-4-04-8539500	—	—
13	August 10, 2015	978-4-04-1022429	—	—
14	February 10, 2018	978-4-04-1062074	—	—
15	December 9, 2019	978-4-04-1086643	—	—
16	October 8, 2021	978-4-04-1115701	—	—
17	March 10, 2023	978-4-04-1131572	—	—
18	March 10, 2025	978-4-04-1158104	—	—
19	May 9, 2026	978-4-04-1173336	—	—

=== Film adaptation ===
A film adaptation of The Five Star Stories covers the events in the first arc of the manga, Destiny Three Fates: Lachesis. It was created by Sunrise, directed by Kazuo Yamazaki, produced by Haruki Kadokawa, and premiered in Japan on March 11, 1989, as a double-bill with Utsunomiko. It was re-released in 2002 in DVD format. It was licensed by the now-defunct ADV Films, which released an English version in March 2005.

Yūganaru dassō (優雅なる脱走), a track from the anime film's soundtrack, was sampled in the 2025 song "Do the Dance" by South Korean girl group Illit.

== Reception ==
According to Oricon, reboots of the first three volumes have all ranked within the top 30 best-selling manga of during their release week: Book I at number 11 selling 31,471 copies, book II at number 23 selling 30,958 copies, and book III at number 15 selling 38,437 copies. The manga had over 8.5 million copies in print as of January 2018.
