= List of Brain Powerd characters =

The following is a list of characters in the 1998 anime series Brain Powerd directed by Yoshiyuki Tomino.

== Yuu Isami ==
Yuu Isami (伊佐未 勇, Isami Yū)
Voiced by: Tetsu Shiratori (Japanese); Matt Smith (English)

Yuu Isami is a young teenage boy and the protagonist of the story "Brain Powerd". A former Reclaimer, after a fateful encounter with Hime Utsumiya, Yuu decides to leave Orphan, escaping with a Brain Powered. Despite the frictions between his family's ambitions to discover more of the Orphan's nature and his own desire for freedom, Yuu understands the value of life and the memories that he would cherish in his life. He tends to be a lone-wolf, often going off on his own for unofficial missions or sitting alone on the deck, staring at the sky.

== Hime Utsumiya ==
Hime Utsumiya (宇都宮 比瑪, Utsumiya Hime)
Voiced by: Akino Murata (Japanese); Lalainia Lindbjerg (Episodes 1+2)/Maggie Blue O'Hara (Episodes 3-26) (English)

Hime Utsumiya is a 17 year old, young teenage girl and the female lead character of the anime "Brain Powerd". She comes into contact with an organic plate which later witnessed its revival into an Antibody, a Brain Powerd, and became its pilot. Supposedly she was chosen to become the Orphan's force of hope in giving understanding to its intention to move freely, which in the end she gave the Orphan the meaning of life after trying to rescue Quincy, like a lone seed growing to become a garden of beauty. She has a greater sense of adaptational heroism and courage to protect the world from many sister threats.

== Jonathan Glenn ==
Jonathan Glenn (ジョナサン·グレーン, Jonasan Gurēn)
Voiced by: Gō Aoba (Japanese); Kirby Morrow/Ward Perry (Episode 6 only) (English)

Jonathan Glenn is a Reclaimer at Orphan. Disgruntled at the way Yu was favored by his parents, he became very bitter towards him and wants to compete who is the strongest Antibody pilot. And even his resentment towards his real mother, Capt. Anoa McCormick was abandoned since childhood but was replaced by his undying loyalty to Baron Maximilian. He is aggressive and powerful. Commonly competing with Quincy Issa for control of the Reclaimers. Jonathan also fiercely competes with Yuu, going so far as to taunt him during one of their battles about having had sex with his sister (Quincy Issa) and having a tryst with his mother (Midori Isami). He is always eager to fight and desires to beat both Yu and Quincy. He is afraid of living and fighting independently and eventually learns to care for his mother.

== Quincy Issa ==
Quincy Issa (クインシィ·イッサー, Kuinshī Issā) / Īko Isami (伊佐未 依衣子, Isami Īko)
Voiced by: Kumiko Watanabe (Japanese); Jennifer Copping (Episodes 1-13)/Jillian Michaels (Episodes 14-26) (English)
Real Name: Iiko Isami.

Quincy Issa is a young teenage girl and Yūu's elder sister. She is the pilot of the red Quincy Grand. A brash leader of the Reclaimers, she disregards any human emotion and resents Yuu for being favored by the Antibodies of Orphan. She became confused about Yuu's conviction to let Orphan be released from any guilt that her Gran Cher rebelled against her confused state and even Orphan favored her to become the "Girl of Orphan", the chosen embodiment of Orphan's will. In the end, she was rescued by Yuu who gave her an understanding of what the Orphan wanted to do.

== Kanan Gimms ==
Kanan Gimms (カナン·ギモス, Kanan Gimosu)
Voiced by: Romi Park (Japanese); Saffron Henderson (English)

Kanan Gimms is a young, talented former Grand Cher pilot. She was Yuū's best friend and had been raised in Orphan. She leaves Orphan and joins Novis Noah. She is the pilot of Kanan Brain, the other twin of Brain Powerd created from the single Antibody B-Plate. Although she has deep feelings for Yuu, she maintains her spirited energy but she is reluctant in leaving her home in Orphan to discover new things in Novis-Noah.

== Anoa McCormick ==
Anoa McCormick (アノーア·マコーミック, Anōa Makōmikku)
Voiced by: Masako Isobe (Japanese); Saffron Henderson (English)

Anoa McCormick is the captain of the state-of-the-art warship Novis Noah. Her strong exterior hides her dark secret, because of her longing to be close to her son Jonathan Glenn. But to her own frustrations, she was always ostracized by her son. She nearly gets lost in a Chakra wave, then reappears as a dark character named Baron Maximilian.

== Russ Lundberg ==
Russ Lundberg (ラッセ·ルンベルグ, Rasse Runberugu)
Voiced by: Shin-ichiro Miki (Japanese); Brian Drummond/Don Brown (Episode 6 only) (English)

Russ Lundberg is a Brain Powerd pilot aboard the Novis-Noa. He is one of the first Brain Powerd pilots, along with Nanga and Hime. He is a slim, blonde-haired man with an interest in Kanan Gimms. He has leukaemia and has lived as long as he has without treatment due to his interaction with the Brain Powerds.

== Nanga Silverly ==
Nanga Silverly (ナンガ·シルバレー, Nanga Shirubarē)
Voiced by: Shinpachi Tsuji (Japanese); Don Brown (English)

Nanga Silverly is another Brain Powerd pilot who is with Lasse and Hime in their quest to search for other B-Plates. He is the official squad leader of the Brain Powerd and one of the most muscular men on board.

== Higgins Saz ==
Higgins Saz (ヒギンズ·サス, Higinzu Sazu)
Voiced by: Maria Kawamura (Japanese); Willow Johnson/Cathy Weseluck (Episode 6 only) (English)

Higgins Saz is the pilot of a yellow Brain Child, Higgins Brain the other twin Brain Powered created from a single Antibody B-Plate. Higgins has a rose tattoo that reacts warmly every time Orphan reacts to a positive emotion. Higgins is almost always in a yellow jumpsuit. It is noted that she and Captain Laite are romantically involved.

== Kant Kestner ==
Kant Kestner (カント·ケストナー, Kanto Kesutonā)
Voiced by: Run Sasaki (Japanese); Danny McKinnon (English)

Kant Kestner is a genius kid who became a scientist at age 12. He soon befriends one of Nakki's Brain Powerds and becomes its pilot later in the series. Kant is a gifted artist with a love of plants and is able to base most of his papers and theories on photosynthesis. Due to his young age and intellect, he had a hard childhood without friends. Even though he is curious about organic energy, he has no desire to go to Orphan to learn.

== Irene Carrier ==
Irene Carrier (アイリーン·キャリアー, Airīn Kyariā)
Voiced by: Shiho Nagoshi (Japanese); Lisa Ann Beley (English)

Irene Carrier is the medical doctor, acupuncturist and, in later series, the new captain of Novis Noah after Capt. McCormick's disappearance. While she is a doctor, she was also a top officer in the military. She is looked up to by Hime since she has motherly tendencies in keeping everyone in Novis-Noa safe.

== Nakki Guys ==
Nakki Guys (ナッキィ·ガイズ, Nakkī Gaizu)
Voiced by: Yumi Touma (Japanese); Andrew Francis (English)

Nakki Guys is the pilot of surprisingly four Antibodies, three Brain Powerds, and one Grand Cher. Brash and Impulsive, Nakki has the tendency to outlook other Brain pilots and has affection for Hime. But because of his impulsiveness, he always gets into trouble during battle. He might be trying to be the best Antibody pilot among his peers but realizes that he is still inexperienced in other matters than just being who he was.

== Comodo Mahama ==
Comodo Mahama (コモド·マハマ, Komodo Mahama)
Voiced by: Shoko Sakura (Japanese); Jenn Forgie/Cathy Weseluck (Episode 6 only) (English)

Comodo Mahama is a reconnaissance fighter pilot who wishes to have her own Brain Powerd since she was jealous of her colleagues in the Novis Noa. A devotee to her god Ogoun, she always prays for strength in her battles and asks for a sign if she will be with Nanga.

== Winston Geybridge ==
Winston Geybridge (ウィンストン·ゲイブリッジ, Winsuton Geiburijji)
Voiced by: Masato Sako (Japanese); Ward Perry (English)

Winston Geybridge is the current UN secretary-general who is also the supreme leader of the Reclaimer faction. He was romantically linked with Naoko Isami in the past until now, but his intention in keeping Orphan is to maintain the balance of Earth's environment. He was ousted by Baron Maximilian and arrested with Naoko until the release of Quincy from her state as the girl of Orphan.

== Naoko Isami ==
Naoko Isami (伊佐未直子, Isami Naoko)
Voiced by: Rumi Sugimoto (Japanese); Ellen Kennedy (English)

Naoko Isami is the matriarch of the Isami household and Yuu's caring and loving grandmother. Even though she resents her daughter and son-in-law's research on using their children as initial "vessels" for the Antibodies, she was able to give her own wisdom to Yu. She is the long-lost lover of Winston Geybridge and until now she still is close to him.

== Shiela Glass ==
Shiela Glass (シラー·グラス, Shirā Gurasu)
Voiced by: Atsuko Tanaka (Japanese); Ellen Kennedy (English)

Shiela Glass is another Reclaimer Grand Cher pilot, quite amazing, and has zealousness in following the ideals of the Reclaimers. The reason is that she has a sibling who died during the Grand Cher wars, but in the end, she realized that she was following the wrong idealism after her encounter with Higgins Saz. Shiela is very physically strong, being able to lift Higgins clear off the ground with only one hand. She is in support of Jonathan Glenn over the Isami family that rules Orphan.

== Edgar Brancan ==
Edgar Brancan (エッガ・ブランカン, Egar Blancan)
Voiced by: Keiichi Nanba (Japanese); Trevor Devall (English)

Edgar Brancan is a reclaimer at Orphan, and the pilot of the Black Edgar Grand Cher. He has high ambitions to out beat Jonathan Glenn and become the new leader of Orphan.

== Baron Maximilian ==
Baron Maximillian (バロン·マクシミリアン, Baron Makushimirian)
Voiced by: Masako Isobe (Japanese); Saffron Henderson (English)

Baron Maximilian is the pilot of a powerful and evolved Antibody, the Baronz Grand Cher. At first, he was just a mentor for Jonathan temporarily he gave his Baronz Grand Cher to him, which in the end he/she was actually Anoa McCormick, the missing captain of Novis Noa. Baron Maximilian takes control of Orphan all in the name of Jonathan.

== Nelly Kim ==
Nelly Kim (ネリー·キム, Nerī Kimu)
Voiced by: Haruko Takahagi (Japanese); Alaina Burnett (English)

Nelly Kim is a lone Brain Powerd pilot whom Yuu met when he and his Brain was damaged by Baron Grand Cher. She gave Yuu pieces of wisdom on how to listen and understand carefully how his Brain feels. But at the end of the second attack made by Baron Grand Cher, she fell and disappeared in a storm just as the two damaged Brains fused in a Chakra wave and became a hybrid Brain Powerd named Nelly Brain.

== K.D. Dean ==
K.D. Dean (ケイディ·ディン, Keidi Din)
Voiced by: Isshin Chiba (Japanese); Michael Tiernan (English)

K.D. Dean is Orphan's undercover spy working at Novis Noah. K.D. is also a Grand Cher pilot but gets shot down while fleeing the ship. He like, most others touched by orphan, is ambitious and willing to kill anyone in his way. He survives and stays on Novis Noa.

== Yukio ==
Yukio (ユキオ, Yukio)
Voiced by: Miya Asakawa (Japanese); Alex Doduk (English)

Yukio is one of the three children whom Hime took care of in the first episode. Although responsive in protecting their "big sister" Hime, Yukio is very affectionate in keeping his relationship with the inhabitants in the Novis-Noa while hoping for everything that has happened on Earth.

== Kumazo ==
Kumazo (クマゾー, Kumazō)
Voiced by: Kumiko Watanabe (Japanese); Cathy Weseluck (English)

Kumazo is of the three children living in the Novis Noah. Although he was involved in some unfortunate events (like being in the hands of a Brain Powerd or Grand Cher), he was able to listen and understand how the Brains are affected by the changes of Orphan.

== Akari ==
Akari (アカリ, Akari)
Voiced by: Shoko Sakura (Japanese); Chantal Strand (English)

Akari is the only girl among the three children in the Novis Noa. She looks up to Hime as a mother-like parent. Always helping out with some manual chores inside Novis-Noa while getting jealous of Yu's closeness to Hime most of the time.

== Captain Laite ==
Captain Laite (レイト艦長, Reito-kanchō)
Voiced by: Hidetoshi Nakamura (Japanese); Paul Dobson (English)

Captain Laite is the captain of Novis Noah's Private submarine and Higgins' lover. He is a tall bald man who has little role in the series other than recon.

== Kensaku Isami ==
Kensaku Isami (伊佐未 研作, Isami Kensaku)
Voiced by: Ryuichi Horibe (Japanese); Don Brown (English)

Kensaku Isami is Yu and Quincy's father, a researcher in the Antibody project, and later the head scientist inside Orphan. He was more interested in his research than the welfare of his own children, being used as guinea pigs in researching Antibodies in response to human emotions. In the end, he realizes that he puts a lot of effort into the research only to find out what Orphan wants to do after Quincy Issa became the Girl of Orphan.

== Midori Isami ==
Midori Isami (伊佐未 翠, Isami Midori)
Voiced by: Shoko Kanoki (Japanese); Sylvia Zaradic/Ellen Kennedy (Episode 12 only) (English)

Midori Isami is Kensaku's wife and assistant. She has little love for her husband, in which while he is focusing on his work she has some "safe fun" with Jonathan Glen whom she fancies more. She merely marries him to progress research into organic energy and to gain a solid power base to become the leader of Orphan. She is a cold and calculating woman who is more than willing to use her own children as mere tools for her goals.

== Girl from Orphan ==
Girl from Orphan (オルファンの少女, Orufan no Shōjo)
Voiced by: Ikue Ohtani

The Girl from Orphan is a human entity that serves as the new will of Orphans. Originally it was Hime who could channel into Orphan's lifestream and revealed to her the beautiful memories with her mother before the war, which proves she is a suitable candidate. But after the few last episodes, it was Quincy Issa, after her Gran Cher evolved and was accidentally taken by Orphan because of her confused and unstable personality. But in the end, after both Yu and Hime convince Orphan to just leave the planet, Quincy was freed from her state while leaving wisdom that life should move on, where it can leave seeds of life for the next generations to enjoy.
