= Heavy Metal L-Gaim =

Japanese mecha anime television series

- 重戦機エルガイム
- Genre: Mecha; Military fiction action
- Creators: Hajime Yatate (concept); Yoshiyuki Tomino (story)
- Director: Yoshiyuki Tomino (chief)
- Series composition: Yūji Watanabe
- Character designer: Mamoru Nagano
- Music: Kei Wakakusa
- Country of origin: Japan
- Original language: Japanese
- No. of episodes: 54

Production
- Producers: Toru Moriyama (Nagoya TV); Onishi Kuniaki (Sotsu Agency); Hironori Nakagawa (Nippon Sunrise)
- Production companies: Nagoya TV; Sotsu Agency; Nippon Sunrise

Original release
- Networks: ANN (Nagoya TV, TV Asahi)
- Release: February 4, 1984 – February 23, 1985

Related
- Original video animation
- Directed by: Yoshiyuki Tomino (ep 1, 2); Osamu Sekita (ep 3)
- Studio: Nippon Sunrise
- Released: November 5, 1986 – March 28, 1987
- Runtime: 60 minutes each
- Episodes: 3

Heavy Metal L-Gaim (重戦機エルガイム, Jūsenki Erugaimu; literally "Heavy Fighting Machine L-Gaim") is a mecha anime television series, begun in 1984, which was created and directed by Yoshiyuki Tomino. Its characters and mecha were designed by Mamoru Nagano, who would later go on to create The Five Star Stories. Heavy Metal L-Gaim takes place in the Pentagona System, a solar system made up of five planets. Oldna Poseidal, the legendary emperor from the planet Gastogal leads his 24 Temple Knights from planet to planet until all have fallen under his control. His final victory is on the planet Mizum in 3975 when he defeats Kamon Walha V, ruler of the Yaman Clan. Kamon hides his heir, Kamon Myroad on the planet Mizum with the legendary white mecha, L-Gaim. Fifteen years later, in 3990, said child, now known as Daba Myroad, leads a rebellion to free the planets of Pentagona from Poseidal's grasp.

== Plot ==
On the planet Koam, Daba Myroad and his friend Mirao Kyao fight off a group of thieves. One, Fanneria Amu, defects after falling in love with Daba. Daba promises one dying thief to deliver a cash card to Amandara Kamandara, and they head to Prearmo, where Daba meets Lillith Fuau, the last remaining fairy in the Pentagona world. Daba cannot find Amandara Kamandara, but the thieves' new leader Gavlet Gablae finds him and is recruited to the Poseidal military, serving under Chai Char, one of the military's 'Elite 13'.

Amandara leaves for the planet Mizum, with Daba's group following in a stolen space shuttle to return the cash card, with Poseidal military officer Gaw Ha Leccee on board. They arrive on Mizum pursued by Gavlet, but are saved by rebels. Leccee falls in love with Daba and defects from the military, so her lover Giwaza Lowau, head of the Elite 13, sends Nei Mo Han to fight the rebels. Nei, Gavlet and Chai attack the rebels without success. Daba's group join the rebels, led by Stella Coban. Daba finally meets Amandara and returns the cash card; Amandara gives the rebels a lot of money and weapons. The military then massacre the rebels, with Chai and Stella killed in the battle. Daba's group leave Mizum, but Amu decides to stay.

Daba and Kyao head to Theart Star, an independent asteroid base populated entirely by women, led by Full Flat. Gavlet follows in a planetary bomber, forcing them out of Theart Star. Daba launches an assault on Poseidal's capital Sveto, on the planet Gastogal. Hopelessly outnumbered, they escape when Amu arrives with a ship given to her by Amandara. Heading to the planet Trydetol, they encounter Daba's adopted sister, Quwasan Olibee, who is under Poseidal's control.

Reaching Trydetol, they are bombarded by the military. A radical from Poseidal's army ambushes Daba with his Heavy Metal, but is unsuccessful. Gavlet controls many Heavy Metals, but performs poorly with them. Kyao kidnaps an inventor, Mesh Maker, a rebel sympathizer, who helps Kyao upgrade his technology using the L-Gaim, creating the L-Gaim Mk-II, which defeats the Heavy Metals with ease. Leccee leaves in desperation at the rebels' slow progress. Joining rebel leader Semuj Shato, Daba builds the rebels' power, planning an assault on Gastogal. Poseidal promotes Olibee over Giwaza, who gathers the Elite 13 to overthrow her in revenge and take over Pentagona. The rebels return to Mizum and reunite with Leccee. After numerous battles, Daba leaves Mizum, again encountering Olibee, still in Poseidal's grasp.

Giwaza sends word to Poseidal that Full Flat is assisting the rebels, and captures Daba, convincing Full Flat to ally with Giwaza. It is revealed that Poseidal and Full Flat have eternal youth, bestowed upon them by Amandara. Daba escapes from Full Flat, who directs Theart Star towards Gastogal. Semuj is revealed as Full Flat's spy, but Daba forgives him. Leccee rejoins the rebels with reinforcements, heads to Sveto and encounters Poseidal. She finds Nei, Poseidal's captive since Giwaza abandoned her, and orders her to assassinate Giwaza, but Nei is killed in the attempt.

The rebels enact the StarDust Plan, launching hundreds of asteroids towards Sveto. Giwaza advances his forces towards the planet, capturing Olibee. Gavlet, who is in love with her, and Daba try unsuccessfully to save her. The factions converge around Sveto and the battle begins. Full Flat confronts Poseidal, reminding her that she is a puppet of Amandara, the real Poseidal. The battle escalates and Flat is killed when the L-Gaim Mk-II falls on her. Daba and Gavlet board Giwaza's ship and rescue Olibee, following a duel with Giwaza.

Poseidal, whose real name is Mian, is struggling to regain her lost memories when Amandara appears and confronts her, to retake his position as Poseidal. Amandara sends Daba a message to entrap him, hoping to kill him, but Daba sees through this. Olibee, who bonded with Mian, feels that she is in danger, and Daba agrees to save Mian, while Amu and Leccee support the rebels bombarding Sveto. Daba and Olibee fight their way into Sveto. Angered by Amandara's manipulative behaviour, Mian turns on him with her personal guard, who remain loyal to her despite Amandara being the true Poseidal. Daba arrives to rescue Mian, but Amandara takes her hostage. An explosion interrupts the conflict and Amandara flees, pursued by Daba. Mian's bodyguards help her to the control center which powers her and Amandara's eternal youth, though stopping Amandara will also kill her.

Amandara reveals his Heavy Metal, the Auge, powered by the population's energy, which keeps him eternally young and invulnerable. Amandara's Auge grows increasingly powerful, overwhelming Daba. Mian deactivates the bio-relation, cancelling their eternal youth and immediately killing them, as Daba attacks the now-vulnerable Auge, assisted by the arrival of Gavlet. Giwaza's forces are annihilated by the rebels, and with the death of the true Poseidal, the rebels declare victory. Giwaza attempts to escape in a shuttle, attacking Daba and Gavlet in desperation. Daba fires one last shot of the Buster Launcher and incinerates Giwaza. After the battle, Daba returns to Koam to live, to take care of Olibee, left brain damaged by Poseidal's control. Gavlet, Leccee, and Amu bid them a sad farewell.

== Cast ==
Character	Actor	Character	Actor
Daba Myroad	Hirokazu Hiramatsu	Fanneria Amu	Chieko Honda
Mirao Kyao	Hōchū Ōtsuka	Gaw Ha Leccee	Maria Kawamura
Lillith Fuau	Maria Kawamura	Oldna Poseidal	Saeko Shimazu
Amandara Kamandara	Ryuichi Horibe	Full Flat	Mika Doi
Gavlet Gablae	Shō Hayami	Quwasan Olibee	Yumi Kinoshita
Giwaza Lowau	Tomomichi Nishimura	Nei Mo Han	Harumi Takeuchi

== Music ==
Openings

1. "L-Gaim -Time for L-GAIM-" (エルガイム-Time for L-GAIM-, Erugaimu -Time for L-GAIM-) by MIQ
2. "Kaze no No Reply" (風のノー・リプライ, Kaze no Nō Ripurai; "No Reply from the Wind") by Mami Ayukawa

Insert song
"Kizutsuita Jealousy" (傷ついたジェラシー, Kizutsuita Jerashī; "Wounded Jealousy") by Mami Ayukawa
Ending
"Starlight Shower" (スターライトシャワー, Sutāraito Shawā) by MIO

== Availability outside of Japan ==
The show was part of a digital subscription package from Daisuki. It was added by Daisuki in February 2017. Sentai Filmworks liscensed and released the series on Blu-ray in North America on May 12, 2026.

== OVAs ==
Three OVAs were released after the show's airing.

- Heavy Metal L-Gaim I: Pentagona Window + Lady Gable (released November 5, 1986)
- Heavy Metal L-Gaim II: Farewell My Lovely + Pentagona Dolls (released January 10, 1987)
- Heavy Metal L-Gaim III: Full Metal Soldier (released March 28, 1987)

The first and second OVAs are compilations of the first and second halves of the series respectively, and each contains an additional short story. The third is an original story that takes place in the middle of the series after episode 18, featuring additional members of the "Elite 13" and new heavy metals.
